= Slice to Sharp =

Slice to Sharp is a ballet made for New York City Ballet's Diamond Project by Jorma Elo to music by Heinrich Ignaz Franz von Biber and Antonio Vivaldi. The premiere took place on 16 June 2006 at the New York State Theater, Lincoln Center with lighting by Mark Stanley and costumes by Holly Hynes.

== Music ==
Biber

- Partia VI in D, mvmt. III

Vivaldi

- Concerto. 2 in C, RV 189, mvmt. III
- Concerto in G, Op. 4, no.3, RV 301, mvmt. I
- Concerto. 4 in A, Op. 4, RV 357, mvmt. II
- Concerto in G, Op.4, no. 3, RV 301, mvmt. III
- Concerto in C, Op. 57, no.1, RV 507, mvmt. III
- Concerto in A, Op. 3, no. 5, RV 519, mvmt. III
- Concerto in A, Op.3, no. 8, RV 522, mvmt. II
- Concerto in E♭, Op. 8, no. 5, RV 253, mvmt. I

== Original cast ==
- Wendy Whelan
- Maria Kowroski
- Ana Sophia Scheller
- Sofiane Sylve
- Craig Hall
- Edwaard Liang
- Joaquín De Luz
- Amar Ramasar

== Reviews ==
- NY Times review by John Rockwell, 19 June 2006
- NY Times review by Alastair Macaulay, 18 February 2009
