= Outlier (ballet) =

Outlier is a ballet made by Wayne McGregor for New York City Ballet to Thomas Adès' Violin Concerto (Concentric Paths), Op. 24 (2005). The premiere was Saturday, 14 May 2010 at the David H. Koch Theater, Lincoln Center, New York.

Concentric Paths, subtitle of the concerto for violin and chamber orchestra, refers to outliers who remain peripheral to actors having a common center. There is harmonious dance within the circle until an outlier intrudes, creating conflict among the men with regard to the women. The lighting is coded for mood: red for strong emotions, yellow for tranquil, grey for somber. The grouping of dancers in three movements reflects the triadic nature of the score.

== Casts ==
=== Original ===
- Ashley Bouder
- Sterling Hyltin
- Maria Kowroski
- Tiler Peck
- Wendy Whelan
- Adrian Danchig-Waring
- Joaquín De Luz
- Robert Fairchild
- Gonzalo Garcia
- Craig Hall
- Amar Ramasar

== Reviews ==
- NY Times, Alastair Macaulay, 16 May 2010
- NY Times, Alastair Macaulay, 3 February 2011
