= Polyphonia =

Ballet by Christopher Wheeldon

- Choreographer: Christopher Wheeldon
- Music: György Ligeti
- Premiere: January 4, 2001; New York State Theater
- Original ballet company: New York City Ballet
- Design: Holly Hynes

Polyphonia is a one-act ballet choreographed by Christopher Wheeldon to music by György Ligeti, costumes designed by Holly Hynes, and was created for the New York City Ballet. It premiered on January 4, 2001 at the New York State Theater. It is regarded as Wheeldon's breakthrough, and won the Laurence Olivier Award for Best New Dance Production in 2003.

== Production ==
Performed by the New York City Ballet, Polyphonia premiered on January 4, 2001 at the New York State Theater. It was the first premiere of the company's winter season.

Polyphonia is the first ballet Wheeldon created after he became artist-in-residence with the New York City Ballet and retired from dancing. It is plotless. Wheeldon described it as "romantic with comic twists", and said it was inspired by Norman Morrice's works, though reviewers have noted it also includes homage to Frederick Ashton and George Balanchine, especially the latter's "leotard ballets". The title is a reference to micropolyphony, a kind of polyphonic musical texture developed by György Ligeti, whose music is used in this ballet.

The cast includes four men and four women, including Wendy Whelan, who went on to create 12 more roles for Wheeldon, and became his most frequent collaborator until she retired from NYCB in 2014. She later credited working with Wheeldon on Polyphonia for helping her "began to find herself as a dancer", and Wheeldon said Whelan "launched me as a choreographer".

== Other companies and revivals ==
External videos
- PNB's Polyphonia excerpts, YouTube video

In 2002, Polyphonia premiered in London, danced by Benjamin Millepied's group Danses Concertantes which consisted of NYCB dancers, at Sadler's Wells Theatre. In the 2003 Laurence Olivier Awards, the production won Best New Dance Production, and Wheeldon was also nominated for Outstanding Achievement in Dance for choreographing Polyphonia and Tryst. The Royal Ballet, where Wheeldon had also danced, and San Francisco Ballet both debuted Polyphonia in 2003. Wheeldon's own troupe, the Morphoses/The Wheeldon Company, had also danced Polyphonia, with a cast consisted of NYCB dancers, except 15-year-old Beatriz Stix-Brunell, later a Royal Ballet first soloist. In 2015, Polyphonia became Wheeldon's first work performed by the Paris Opera Ballet, as part of a mixed bill honoring the 90th birthday of Pierre Boulez, a conductor and composer who knew Ligeti. Other companies that had danced it include Boston Ballet, The Washington Ballet and Miami City Ballet.

== Music ==
Polyphonia is set to György Ligeti's music, including:

- Désordre and Arc-en-ciel from Études pour piano, premier livre
- No. 4 Tempo di Valse, No. 8 Vivace energico, No. 7 Cantabile molto legato, No. 3 Allegro con spirito and No. 2 Mesto, rigido e cerimoniale from Musica ricercata
- Invention
- Three Wedding Dances
- Capriccio No. 2 from Due capricci

== Casts ==
- World premiere: Wendy Whelan, Jennie Somogyi, Jennifer Tinsley, Alexandra Ansanelli, Jock Soto, Edwaard Liang, Jason Fowler, Craig Hall
- San Francisco Ballet premiere: Yuan Yuan Tan, Lorena Feijoo, Julie Diana, Kristin Long, Yuri Possokhov, Gonzalo Garcia, Ruben Martin, Zachary Hench
- Royal Ballet premiere: Leanne Benjamin, Alina Cojocaru, Jaimie Tapper, Lauren Cuthbertson, Jonathan Cope, Federico Bonelli, Valeri Hristov, Edward Watson
- Paris Opera Ballet premiere: Amandine Albisson, Lydie Vareilhes, Léonore Baulac, Jennifer Visocchi, Stéphane Bullion, Marc Moreau, Germain Louvet, Axel Ibot

== Videography ==
In 2020, in response to the impacts of the coronavirus pandemic on the performing arts, the New York City Ballet will extracts from a performance filmed earlier that year online, including a pas de deux between Lauren Lovette and Andrew Veyette, and another section with Lovette, Veyette, Megan Fairchild, Alston Macgill, Sara Mearns, Jovani Furlan, Roman Mejia and Silas Farley. Apart from Mearns, all the dancers were making their debut when the performance was filmed.
