= Five Movements, Three Repeats =

- Choreographer: Christopher Wheeldon
- Music: Max Richter; Clyde Otis
- Premiere: August 6, 2012; Gerald R. Ford Amphitheater, Vail, Colorado
- Created for: Fang-Yi Sheu; Wendy Whelan; Tyler Angle; Craig Hall

Five Movements, Three Repeats is a dance choreographed by Christopher Wheeldon. It is set to music by Max Richter, including his mashup of "This Bitter Earth", written by Clyde Otis and sung by Dinah Washington. It premiered at the Vail International Dance Festival in Gerald R. Ford Amphitheater, Vail, Colorado, performed by Fang-Yi Sheu, Wendy Whelan, Tyler Angle and Craig Hall. The "This Bitter Earth" pas de deux is often performed separately from the rest of the piece.

== Production ==
Five Movements, Three Repeats was created for the Vail International Dance Festival, and premiered there in August 2012, after an incomplete version with the same cast was danced there the previous year. The original cast includes Fang-Yi Sheu, a Taiwanese modern dancer and former Martha Graham Dance Company principal dancer, and three dancers from New York City Ballet: principal dancers Wendy Whelan, Tyler Angle, and soloist Craig Hall.

The title is a reference to the use of five songs by Max Richter, and a section with all four dancers in their "separate zones" is repeated three times, including once "spatially reversed". A pas de deux originated by Whelan and Angle is set to a mashup of "This Bitter Earth", written by Clyde Otis and sung by Dinah Washington, and Richter's "On the Nature of Daylight", first used in the film Shutter Island. Sheu danced barefoot and Whelan was in pointe shoes.

== Revivals ==
External videos
- Christopher Wheeldon's "This Bitter Earth", YouTube video
- New York City Ballet Presents Christopher Wheeldon's This Bitter Earth, YouTube video

In September 2012, the "This Bitter Earth" pas de deux was added to New York City Ballet's repertory. The company first performed it at their fall gala, with Whelan and Angle reprising their respective roles, wearing costumes from the fashion house Valentino. The company had since revived it with other casts, donning Reid Bartelme's costumes instead.

Also in September 2012, the original cast performed Five Movements, Three Repeats for the Fall for Dance Festival at the New York City Center. Sheu later performed the piece with former Alvin Ailey American Dance Theater dancer Clifton Brown, and San Francisco Ballet principal dancers Yuan Yuan Tan and Damian Smith. In 2016, Vail International Dance Festival revived the "This Bitter Earth" pas de deux, danced by Isabella Boylston and Calvin Royal III, both from the American Ballet Theatre, accompanied by live vocals from Kate Davis.

== Videography ==
In 2020, New York City Ballet made a one-shot film with an excerpt of the "This Bitter Earth" pas de deux, danced by Sara Mearns and Adrian Danchig-Waring. Whelan, who became the associate artistic director of the company, was present on set. The short film was originally made to promote the spring season, which was cancelled before the film was released due to the coronavirus pandemic.

Due to the pandemic, the Vail International Dance Festival in 2020 used a digital format, and a video of the 2016 performance of the "This Bitter Earth" pas de deux with Boylston and Royal was streamed on its opening night.
