= Vienna Waltzes =

Ballet by George Balanchine

- Choreographer: George Balanchine
- Music: Johann Strauss II; Franz Lehár; Richard Strauss
- Premiere: June 23, 1977; New York State Theater
- Original ballet company: New York City Ballet
- Design: Karinska; Rouben Ter-Arutunian; Ronald Bates

Vienna Waltzes is a ballet choreographed by George Balanchine to music by Johann Strauss II, Franz Lehár and Richard Strauss, made as a tribute to Austria. It premiered on June 23, 1977 at the New York State Theater, performed by the New York City Ballet, and was an immediate success among the public.

== Background and production ==
Balanchine had been exposed to Viennese dancing since his youth, and had used the 3/4 time signature, which is commonly used in waltz, in some of his works, including Les Valses de Beethoven (1933), The Bat (1936), Waltz Academy (1944), La Valse (1951), Valse Fantaisie (1953), Liebeslieder Walzer (1960) and Trois Valses Romantiques (1967). Balanchine conceived the idea of Vienna Waltzes, a large-scale homage to Austria, over a year before he started working on it, having previously made Union Jack, a tribute to Great Britain. Before he started working on the ballet, he spoke with members of the New York City Ballet about his ideas. This would be the last ballet in this style he made, which he called "applause machine." Suzanne Farrell, one of Balanchine's favourite dancers, called Vienna Waltzes "his last word on the survival of romanticism."

Balanchine started choreographing Vienna Waltzes in March 1977. Speaking about the selection of music, he said wanted to use Franz Lehár's and Johann Strauss II's music for "years and years." He had said he preferred works by Lehár over Ludwig van Beethoven's, because the former is "more interesting, less boring." He described Strauss as "fantastic, a great composer, a Mozart of that type of music: operettas, trios, solos." Richard Strauss' Der Rosenkavalier, which Balanchine called "beautiful," was also used in the ballet On the use of "light opera" music, he said, "Operettas are a beautiful thing." He added, "In Russia, I saw nothing but that for a while. I was brought up on operettas." The scores used in the ballet are ordered chronologically. On waltz, Balanchine recalled, "In Russia, we danced waltzes at the balls. Some were slow." However, "Waltzing is very difficult... You cannot waltz if your body is not ready... The man doesn't turn around the girl, the girl turns around the man. The problem is using two legs in [3/4] time. It would be easier if we had three legs."

In her memoir, Farrell wrote that after Balanchine told him she was cast, she was not called to any rehearsals for weeks. By the time she started rehearsing, her frequent partners, Jacques d'Amboise and Peter Martins, had already been cast in other sections, so her partner would be Jean-Pierre Bonnefous. However, d'Amboise dropped out due to an injury, so the role was made on new member Sean Lavery, who found Balanchine worked quickly. The ballet was made on a cast of 74 dancers. Speaking about large-scale ballets such as Vienna Waltzes and Union Jack, original cast member Kay Mazzo said, "it was fun. It wasn't challenging, but Balanchine was in a good frame of mind and everybody was in them and nobody felt left out."

The sets were designed by Rouben Ter-Arutunian, and are visual representations of the scores. The costumes and lighting were designed by Karinska and Ronald Bates respectively.

Following Balanchine's death, the world rights of Vienna Waltzes and five other ballets went to original cast member Karin von Aroldingen.

== Structure and choreography ==
The first three sections of the ballet are all set in a woodland, with five trees Balanchine specifically requested, and choreographed to scores by Johann Strauss II. The first is set to "Tales from the Vienna Woods," Op. 325, led by a woman in pink gown and man in military uniform, alongside a corps de ballet of ten couples, as New York Times critic Anna Kisselgoff described, "strolling through a forest of five prop trees." The next section, described as 'sylvan interlude" by dance critic Richard Buckle, is set to "Voices of Spring", Op. 410. This section features a couple, with the man in what critic John Gruen called "bucolic attire." They dance with eight women in pastel tutus. It is followed by "Explosion Polka", Op. 43, led by what Gruen called "a couple of most unexpected appearance," with the woman in a corseted attire and the man in striped tights. They are joined by three other couples in identical costumes.

The fourth section is set to Lehár's Gold and Silver Waltz", a score that was incorporated into Balanchine's production of Lehár's The Merry Widow. Kisselgoff wrote that this part of the ballet references the opera, with the principal woman, in black gown and hat, representing the titular role of the opera, while her partner, in red and white, is her suitor and an officer. In this section, the scenery is transformed to what Ter-Arutunian described as "a land that is neither forest nor a salon," inspired by Jugendstil, a counterpart of Art Nouveau. Balanchine was not satisfied with this section, and made many changes to this section after the premiere.

The fifth and final section is set to the first sequence of waltzes from Richard Strauss's opera Der Rosenkavalier. The woman, in a white ballgown, first dances alone and her partner, in a black tailcoat, briefly joins her a few times. Farrell, who created the lead female role, described the partner as "somewhat absent." She noted this choice was made when Balanchine was "so tired of running out of men... that he decided I would do without, or almost." The man was the woman's "imaginary support, who appeared and disappeared with gallant grace and cunning throughout what was essentially a solo" for her. The set in this section is a ballroom, but instead of referencing the 18th-century, the setting of Der Rosenkavalier, it reflects early 20th century, the period in which Richard Strauss lived. According to Ter-Arutunian, the scenery here is "a dissolution into the modern age" and inspired by the Vienna Workshop's style of architecture. At the end of the ballet, the principal dancers in previous sections and twenty other couples return to the stage in costumes identical to those worn by the couple in the Der Rosenkavalier section.

== Original cast ==
Section	Principal dancers
"Tale from the Vienna Woods"	Karin von Aroldingen; Sean Lavery
"Voices of Spring"	Patricia McBride; Helgi Tomasson
"Explosion Polka"	Sara Leland; Bart Cook
"Gold and Silver Waltz"	Kay Mazzo; Peter Martins
Der Rosenkavalier	Suzanne Farrell; Jorge Donn (Note: Donn was a guest artist. The role was created on Jean-Pierre Bonnefous, who danced the role at the preview but was unable to perform at the official premiere due to an injury.)

== Performances ==
Vienna Waltzes premiered on June 23, 1977 at the New York State Theater, following a preview performance a week prior. According to Farrell, between the preview and the official premiere, Bonnefous got injured while performing Balanchine's Scotch Symphony. Jorge Donn, who had danced with Farrell at the Béjart Ballet, happened to be in New York, so Farrell suggested Balanchine to have Donn replace Bonnefous. Donn continued to dance Vienna Waltzes throughout the season.

Vienna Waltzes was an immediate success among the public. For four seasons after the premiere, all performances of Vienna Waltzes were sold out. Farrell described it as "perhaps the single most successful ballet in the New York City Ballet's box-office history."

In 1986, Farrell included Vienna Waltzes in her final performance.

== Videography ==
In 1983, Vienna Waltzes was filmed for the PBS broadcast A Lincoln Center Special: A New York City Ballet Tribute to George Balanchine, with most of the original cast returning.

In 1993, the Der Rosenkavalier section of Vienna Waltzes was filmed for PBS broadcast "The Balanchine Celebration," led by Stephanie Saland, Adam Lüders, and also featured Kyra Nichols, Lindsay Fisher, Heather Watts, Jock Soto, Simone Schumacher, Alexandre Proia, Maria Calegari and Erlends Zieminch. It was filmed at Saland's farewell performance.

The New York City Ballet released an archival video recording of Vienna Waltzes online in June 2021, as a response to the impacts of the COVID-19 pandemic. The cast features Rebecca Krohn, Tyler Angle, Megan Fairchild, Anthony Huxley, Erica Pereira, Sean Suozzi, Teresa Reichlen, Ask la Cour, Maria Kowroski and Jared Angle.
