= After the Rain (ballet) =

2005 ballet by Christopher Wheeldon with music by Arvo Pärt

- Choreographer: Christopher Wheeldon
- Music: Arvo Pärt
- Premiere: 22 January 2005; New York State Theater
- Original ballet company: New York City Ballet
- Created for: Wendy Whelan; Jock Soto
- Genre: contemporary ballet

After the Rain is a ballet choreographed by Christopher Wheeldon on New York City Ballet to music of Arvo Pärt, including Tabula Rasa (first movement, Ludus) and Spiegel im Spiegel. The ballet premiered on January 22, 2005, at the New York State Theater, Lincoln Center. The final pas de deux is commonly performed separately from the remainder of the ballet.

== Production ==
External videos
- New York City Ballet MOVES: After The Rain, YouTube video
- NYC Ballet Presents NEW BEGINNINGS, YouTube video

=== Background ===
After the Rain was commissioned as a part of New York City Ballet's annual New Combinations Evening, which honors the anniversary of George Balanchine’s birth with new ballets. It was the last ballet Wheeldon created for Jock Soto before Soto's retirement in June 2005.

=== Choreography and music ===
The first part of the ballet, set to Arvo Pärt's Tabula Rasa, features three couples. The second part is a pas de deux originated by Soto and Wendy Whelan, which Wheeldon said it was a "love letter, this poem to both of them as artists." The music, Pärt's Spiegel im Spiegel, was sent to Wheeldon by a friend after he said he was "stressed out." According to Wheeldon, the pas de deux was created within three rehearsals. The female dancer wears flat shoes instead of pointe shoes, which Whelan was initially "miffed and confused" about as she had never been off pointe in any New York City Ballet performance, and she later recalled thinking Wheeldon was making her "walk like an old lady", but later realized "exactly the opposite of that. It has so many images that are meaningful to me. It's so simple, and yet there's so much love in it." Wheeldon encouraged dancers to interpret the pas de deux in their own ways, and said the worst thing dancers could do is to "act" it.

== Revivals ==
The pas de deux has since been danced by companies such as Joffrey Ballet, Pacific Northwest Ballet, San Francisco Ballet, The Australian Ballet and The Royal Ballet. In 2014, Whelan danced the pas de deux at her final performance with the New York City Ballet, and partnered Craig Hall. The Royal Ballet performed the entirety of After the Rain for the first time in 2016.

== Original cast ==
- Wendy Whelan
- Sofiane Sylve
- Maria Kowroski
- Jock Soto
- Edwaard Liang
- Ask la Cour

== Videography ==
In a 2013 video, Kowroski and la Cour performed the pas de deux on the roof of 4 World Trade Center, which has over 2 million views on YouTube as of 2016.

In light of the impact of the COVID-19 coronavirus pandemic on the performing arts, New York City Ballet released a recording of the pas de deux featuring Wendy Whelan and Craig Hall, recorded on October 9, 2012. San Francisco Ballet streamed a performance featuring Yuan Yuan Tan and Luke Ingham, as a part of the Director's Choice program.
