= Liturgy (ballet) =

2003 ballet by Christopher Wheeldon with music by Arvo Pärt

- Choreographer: Christopher Wheeldon
- Music: Arvo Pärt
- Premiere: May 31, 2003; New York State Theater
- Original ballet company: New York City Ballet
- Design: Holly Hynes
- Created for: Jock Soto; Wendy Whelan
- Genre: Contemporary ballet

Liturgy is a ballet made by New York City Ballet resident choreographer Christopher Wheeldon to Fratres by Arvo Pärt. The premiere took place on May 31, 2003 at the New York State Theater, Lincoln Center, originated by Jock Soto and Wendy Whelan. Whelan described the piece as "a piece about union".

== Videography ==
In light of the impact of the COVID-19 coronavirus pandemic on the performing arts, New York City Ballet released recording of the ballet, featuring Maria Kowroski and Jared Angle, recorded in 2017.
