= Pictures at an Exhibition (ballet) =

- Choreographer: Alexei Ratmansky
- Music: Modest Mussorgsky
- Premiere: October 2, 2014; David H. Koch Theater
- Original ballet company: New York City Ballet
- Design: Adeline André; Wendall K. Harrington

Pictures at an Exhibition is a ballet choreographed by Alexei Ratmansky to Mussorgsky's eponymous score. The ballet premiered on October 2, 2014, at the David H. Koch Theater, danced by the New York City Ballet.

== Production ==
Ratmansky's Pictures at an Exhibition is performed by five men and five women. The original cast includes Wendy Whelan, who had been cast in all of Ratmansky's works for the New York City Ballet at that point and was scheduled to retire from ballet at the end of the season.

The score by Mussorgsky is about a posthumous exhibition of works by Viktor Hartmann. However, Wassily Kandinsky's painting Color Study: Squares With Concentric Circles is projected on stage, designed by Wendall K. Harrington. Adeline André designed the costumes.

The Pacific Northwest Ballet made their debut in Pictures of an Exhibitions in 2017. Whelan staged the ballet for the company, though she had never staged a ballet before. She said she watched the video footage of the ballet repeatedly and spent hours every day over a month to write down the steps.

== Original cast ==
Original cast:

- Sara Mearns
- Tiler Peck
- Abi Stafford
- Wendy Whelan
- Gretchen Smith
- Tyler Angle
- Adrian Danchig-Waring
- Gonzalo Garcia
- Amar Ramasar
- Joseph Gordon

== Reception ==
On the premiere, New York Times wrote that the ballet "is surely the most casually diverse work Mr. Ratmansky has created, but it gathers unstoppable momentum." The Financial Times gave the ballet four stars, and commented that the ballet "abounds in ballet quotations and commentary, yet its tone is not ironic."

== Videography ==
In 2020, in response to the impact of the coronavirus pandemic on the performing arts, the New York City Ballet released a 2017 video recording of excerpts of the ballet, featuring Peck, Mearns, Stafford, Garcia, Angle, Gordon, Sterling Hyltin, Claire Kretzschmar, Aaron Sanz and Andrew Veyette. The latter two were making their debut at the taping.
