= Jonathan Stafford =

American ballet dancer and artistic director

- Born: 1980 or 1981 (age 44–45); Carlisle, Pennsylvania, U.S.
- Occupations: ballet dancer; artistic director
- Employer(s): New York City Ballet; School of American Ballet
- Spouse: Brittany Pollock (m. 2014)
- Relatives: Abi Stafford (sister)

Jonathan Stafford is an American ballet dancer and artistic director. He danced with the New York City Ballet (NYCB) as a principal dancer until his retirement in 2014, then he served as a ballet master. He became the artistic director of NYCB in 2019.

== Early life ==
Stafford was born in Carlisle, Pennsylvania. He trained at the Central Pennsylvania Ballet. He attended summer intensives at the School of American Ballet in 1996 and 1997, then stayed in New York City as a full-time student. He also graduated from Professional Children's School.

== Career ==
Stafford became an apprentice at New York City Ballet in October 1998, and joined the corps de ballet in February 1999. He became a soloist in 2006, and taught in the School of American Ballet as a guest faculty. The following year, he was promoted to principal dancer, and joined SAB's permanent faculty. He had danced lead roles in works by George Balanchine, Jerome Robbins and Christopher Wheeldon. He had also appeared in the 2000 film Center Stage as a background dancer. Stafford's younger-sister, Abi, was also a principal dancer at NYCB. However, they were rarely paired together.

In 2014, Stafford retired from dancing after a performance of Jewels. Abi Stafford and Sara Mearns danced with him in the "Emeralds" and "Diamonds" respectively. After that, he became a ballet master at NYCB. The following year, he was appointed Professional Placement Manager at NYCB, his role was to guide apprentices through their first year.

In December 2017, Peter Martins, then ballet master in chief of NYCB, took a leave of absence and later left after he was accused of sexual abuse. That month, Stafford was chosen to lead the interim leadership team, which also included ballet masters Craig Hall and Rebecca Krohn, and resident choreographer Justin Peck. He brought in retired dancers who worked with Balanchine, such as Patricia McBride and Edward Villella, to coach the current dancers. In February 2019, Stafford was appointed artistic director of the NYCB and SAB, with Wendy Whelan as associate artistic director. The two said they intended to work as partners, Stafford would be in charge of artistic operations while Whelan supervises programming. This is the first NYCB leadership that had never worked with Balanchine.

== Personal life ==
In 2014, Stafford married Brittany Pollack, a soloist at NYCB. They have one child.

Stafford graduated summa cum laude from the Fordham School of Professional and Continuing Studies with a B.A. in Organizational Leadership.
