= The Nightingale and the Rose =

The Nightingale and the Rose may refer to:

In literature

- The nightingale and the rose, a metaphor prevalent in Diwan collections of Persian and Ottoman poetry
- "The Nightingale and the Rose", a story in The Happy Prince and Other Tales by Oscar Wilde

In music

- "The Nightingale and the Rose", song no. 2 from Nikolai Rimsky-Korsakov's song cycle Four Songs, Op. 2 (1865–1866)
- The Nightingale and the Rose, Op. 54, 1911 cantata by Henry Kimball Hadley
- The Nightingale and the Rose, 1927 opera by Hooper Brewster-Jones
- The Nightingale and the Rose, 1927 incidental music/ballet after Wilde by Harold Fraser-Simson
- Rosa rossa, 1938 opera after Wilde, by Renzo Rinaldo Bossi
- Lakstigala un roze, 1938 ballet after Wilde by Jānis Kalniņš
- El Ruiseñor i la Rosa, 1958 ballet by Matilde Salvador
- The Nightingale and the Rose, 1973 opera after Wilde, by Margaret Garwood
- The Nightingale and the Rose, 1983 ballet by David Earl
- The Nightingale and the Rose (opera), 1994 chamber opera after Wilde, by Elena Firsova
- "The Rose and the Nightingale", 1996 impromptu for piano by Ian Venables
- The Nightingale and the Rose (ballet), 2007 ballet by Christopher Wheeldon to music by Bright Sheng
- The Nightingale and the Rose, 2016 chamber opera by Bertie Baigent

In film

- "The Nightingale and the Rose", 2012 short film after Wilde, by Del Kathryn Barton
