= Abi Stafford =

American ballet dancer

- Born: 1981 or 1982 (age 44–45); Carlisle, Pennsylvania
- Occupation: Ballet dancer
- Years active: 1999-present
- Children: 1
- Dancing career
- Current group: New York City Ballet

Abi Stafford is an American ballet dancer. She joined the New York City Ballet in 2000 and was promoted to principal dancer in 2007. She retired in 2021.

== Early life ==
Stafford was born in Carlisle, Pennsylvania. She started ballet when she was six. In 1998, she was admitted to the School of American Ballet in New York City as a full-time student.

== Career ==
Stafford became an apprentice with the New York City Ballet in November 1999. Two months later, she became a member of the corps de ballet. Stafford received the Janice Levin Dancer Award in 2000-01, which was given to promising corps dancers of NYCB.

Stafford was promoted to soloist in 2002 and principal dancer in 2007. She had danced lead roles in nearly 60 ballets, among them are The Nutcracker, Apollo and Dances at a Gathering. She was one of the eight NYCB dancers that performed in Cuba in 2010. She also served as motion capture dancer for Barbie in the Nutcracker and Barbie of Swan Lake.

Stafford was a teaching fellow at School of American Ballet between 2012 and 2016. She became a member of the permanent faculty in 2016.

Stafford's brother, Jonathan Stafford, was also a principal dancer at NYCB. Though the two were seldom paired together, she danced with him in his farewell performance. Jonathan Stafford is now the artistic director of NYCB.

Stafford retired from performing in 2021. In her final performance, she danced Ratmansky's Russian Seasons, in a role she originated.

== Selected repertoire ==
Stafford's repertoire with the New York City Ballet includes:

- Apollo (Polyhmnia)
- Ballo della Regina
- Concerto Barocco
- Coppélia (Dawn)
- Dances at a Gathering
- "Emeralds" from Jewels
- A Midsummer Night's Dream (Hermia, Divertissement)
- The Nutcracker (Sugarplum Fairy, Dewdrop)
- Raymonda Variations
- La Source
- The Sleeping Beauty (Vivacity, Ruby, Princess Florine)
- Swan Lake (Balanchine version) (Pas de Quatre, Russian)
- Swan Lake (Martins version) (Pas de Trois, Pas de Quatre, Russian)
- Symphony in C (First Movement, Third Movement)
- Tschaikovsky Pas de Deux
- Walpurgisnacht Ballet
- Western Symphony (First Movement)

=== Created roles ===
- Bal de Couture
- Namouna, A Grand Divertissement
- Pictures at an Exhibition
- Russian Seasons
- Swerve Poems
- Toccata
- Twilight Courante
- Viva Verdi

== Personal life ==
In 2015, Stafford gave birth to a son.

Stafford has a history degree from Fordham University. She spent eight years to study part-time and graduated in 2018. She started to study law afterwards, and interned at The Legal Aid Society. She is expected to graduate in 2022.
