= The Nightingale and the Rose (ballet) =

The Nightingale and the Rose is a ballet choreographed by Christopher Wheeldon to music by Bright Sheng commissioned by the New York City Ballet. The premiere took place on Friday, June 8, 2007, at the New York State Theater, Lincoln Center, the orchestra conducted by the composer. Its libretto is based on the short story of the same name by Oscar Wilde.

== Original cast ==
- Wendy Whelan
- Sara Mearns
- Tyler Angle

== Reviews ==
- NY Times review by Jennifer Dunning, June 11, 2007
- NY Times review by Alastair Macaulay, February 16, 2008
