= List of San Francisco Ballet 2010 repertory =

San Francisco Ballet dances each year at the War Memorial Opera House, San Francisco, and tours; this is the list of ballets with casts for the 2010 season beginning with the gala, Wednesday, January 20, 2010. The Nutcracker is danced the year before.

== Gala ==
=== notes for gala ===
The Gala's theme was "Silver Celebration" commemorating Artistic Director Helgi Tomasson's 25th anniversary with the company.

== Program one, January 23–31, Full-length ==
- Swan Lake

== Program two, February 9–20, Mixed bill ==
- Opus 19/The Dreamer
- Ghosts
- Company B

== Program three, February 11–21,Mixed bill -- Balanchine Masterworks ==
- Serenade
- Stravinsky Violin Concerto
- Theme and Variations

== Program four, March 2–7, Mixed bill ==
- Diving into the Lilacs
- in the middle, somewhat elevated
- Petrouchka

== Program five, March 20–28, Full-length ==
- The Little Mermaid

== Program six, April 8–21, Mixed program ==
- “Haffner” Symphony
- Underskin
- Russian Seasons

== Program seven, April 9–20, Mixed program ==
- Rush
- Classical Symphony
- The Concert (Or, The Perils of Everybody)

== Program eight, May 1–9, Full-length ==
- Romeo & Juliet
