= Russian Seasons =

Ballet

- Choreographer: Alexei Ratmansky
- Music: Leonid Desyatnikov
- Premiere: June 8, 2006
- Original ballet company: New York State Theater
- Design: Galina Solovyeva

Russian Seasons is a ballet choreographed by Alexei Ratmansky to Leonid Desyatnikov's music of the same name, with costumes designed by Galina Solovyeva. The ballet premiered on June 8, 2006 at the New York State Theater, performed by the New York City Ballet.

Russian Seasons is performed by six couples and has twelve sections, and is about Ratmansky's Russian roots. When he made Russian Seasons for the New York City Ballet, he was the artistic director of the Bolshoi Ballet in Moscow. He had previously made another ballet for the New York Choreographic Institute.

Russian Seasons had also been revived by the Bolshoi Ballet and the National Ballet of Canada. In 2020, in response to the impacts of the coronavirus pandemic on the performing arts, the New York City Ballet will release a 2018 video recording of an excerpt from the ninth section, featuring Abi Stafford, Sara Mearns and Amar Ramasar, and a 2017 footage of the tenth section with Taylor Stanley in his role debut.

== Original cast ==
Original cast:

- Jenifer Ringer
- Sofiane Sylve
- Wendy Whelan
- Albert Evans
- Abi Stafford
- Georgina Pazcoguin
- Sean Suozzi
