= Gonzalo Garcia (dancer) =

Spanish American ballet dancer

- Born: 1979 or 1980 (age 45–46); Zaragoza, Spain
- Citizenship: Spain; United States
- Education: San Francisco Ballet School
- Occupation: Artistic Director at Miami City Ballet
- Spouse: Ezra Hurwitz (m. 2020)
- Career
- Current group: New York City Ballet
- Former groups: San Francisco Ballet

Gonzalo Garcia is a Spanish American ballet dancer. He joined the San Francisco Ballet in 1998, and was promoted to principal in 2002, at age 22. In 2007, he left the company and joined the New York City Ballet. He retired from performing in 2022 and remains in the company as a repertory director.

== Early life ==
Garcia was born in Zaragoza, and trained at Maria de Avila's school. In 1995, he attended a summer intensive at the San Francisco Ballet School, where de Avila's daughter Lola taught. Later that year, he won the Prix de Lausanne at the age of 15, making him the youngest dancer to receive the award. After that, he returned to the San Francisco Ballet School as a full time student. At age 17, he was offered a contract to join the San Francisco Ballet by the artistic director, Helgi Tómasson, though Garcia decided to study for one more year.

== Career ==
Garcia joined the San Francisco Ballet's corps de ballet in 1998, at age 18. In 2000, he became a soloist, and won the Princess Grace Award. In 2002, he was promoted to principal dancer at age 22, one of the youngest dancers in the company to reach this rank. He danced leading roles such as Albrecht in Giselle and Romeo in Romeo and Juliet, and originated the role of Nutcracker Prince in Tómasson's version of The Nutcracker. In 2004, he made a guest appearance at the New York City Ballet and danced Ballo della Regina, as a part of George Balanchine's centennial.

In May 2007, Garcia left the San Francisco Ballet after a performance of Don Quixote. Garcia joined the New York City Ballet as a principal dancer in October 2007. His repertoire there includes works by Balanchine and Jerome Robbins, and originated roles in works by choreographers such as Justin Peck and Alexei Ratmansky. He was coached by Mikhail Baryshnikov for Robbins' Opus 19/The Dreamer. He had performed with Christopher Wheeldon's company, Morphoses/The Wheeldon Company, and appeared in video advertisements of Tiffany & Co. and iPhone.

Garcia retired from performing in February 2022. He remains in the New York City Ballet as a repertory director.

On June 16th, 2025, Garcia was named the Artistic Director of Miami City Ballet.

== Personal life ==
Garcia is a naturalized American citizen.

In August 2020, Garcia married Ezra Hurwitz, a dancer-turned filmmaker. They live in Upper West Side, Manhattan

== Selected repertoire ==
Garcia's repertoire with the San Francisco Ballet and New York City Ballet includes:

- Apollo
- Divertimento from Le Baiser de la Fée
- Ballo della Regina
- Coppélia (Frantz)
- Dances at a Gathering
- Don Quixote: Basilio
- Donizetti Variations
- The Four Temperaments
- Giselle: Albrecht, Pas de Cinq
- Glass Pieces
- Harlequinade: Harlequin
- "Rubies" from Jewels
- A Midsummer Night's Dream: Oberon
- The Nutcracker (Balanchine version): Cavalier
- Polyphonia
- Opus 19/The Dreamer
- Other Dances
- Romeo and Juliet (Martins version): Tybalt
- Romeo and Juliet (Tómasson version): Romeo, Benvolio
- The Sleeping Beauty: Prince Désiré, Bluebird, Pas de Six
- Swan Lake (Martins version): Prince Siegfried, Pas de Quatre
- Swan Lake (Tómasson version): Prince Siegfried, Pas de Trois, Neopolitan
- La Sylphide: James
- Symphony in C
- Tschaikovsky Pas de Deux

=== Created roles ===
- The Nutcracker (Tómasson version): Nutcracker Prince
- Sylvia (Mark Morris version): Aminta
- Bal de Couture
- The Blue of Distance
- Les Carillons
- Concerto DSCH
- Continuum
- The Decalogue
- Grazioso
- Luce Nascosta
- The Most Incredible Thing: The Three Kings
- Outlier
- Pictures at an Exhibition
- Pulcinella Variations
- Rodeo: Four Dance Episodes
- Rotunda
- The Shimmering Asphalt

== Awards and honors ==
- 1995: Prix de Lausanne - gold medal
- 2000: Princess Grace Award
