= Maria Kowroski =

American ballet dancer

- Born: 1977 or 1978 (age 48–49); Grand Rapids, Michigan, U.S.
- Occupation: Artistic director
- Years active: 1994–present
- Spouse: Martin Harvey
- Children: 1
- Dancing career
- Current group: New Jersey School of Ballet
- Former groups: New York City Ballet
- Dances: Ballet

Maria Kowroski is an American ballet dancer. She was a principal dancer at the New York City Ballet.

== Early life ==
Kowroski was born in Grand Rapids, Michigan. She started ballet at the age of five. In 1992, she entered the School of American Ballet in New York City.

== Career ==
In 1994, at the age of 17, Kowroski entered the New York City Ballet as an apprentice, and became a member of the corps de ballet a year later. She was promoted to soloist in 1997 and principal dancer in 1999. She has danced classical productions such as Swan Lake, Balanchine's works including Tchaikovsky Pas de Deux and The Nutcracker, and originated roles such as Christopher Wheeldon's After the Rain. Before her retirement she was the company's most senior dancer, and the only remaining dancer to have worked with founding choreographer Jerome Robbins.

Kowroski had danced with Mariinsky Ballet and Munich Ballet as guest artist. She also performed in Dance Against Cancer's 2019 concert. Also in 2019, Kowroski and fellow principal dancer Tyler Angle staged Agon for the School of American Ballet's showcase.

Kowroski served as motion capture dancer of Barbie for Barbie in the Nutcracker, Barbie of Swan Lake and Barbie in the 12 Dancing Princesses. She also appeared in a documentary regarding the latter.

She retired in October 2021 and became the acting artistic director of the New Jersey Ballet.

== Selected repertoire ==
Kowroski's repertoire with the New York City Ballet includes:

- After the Rain Pas de Deux
- Agon
- Apollo
- Carnival of the Animals
- The Concert
- Concerto Barocco
- Dances at a Gathering
- The Firebird
- "Emeralds", "Rubies" and "Diamonds" from Jewels
- A Midsummer Night's Dream (Titania)
- Movements for Piano and Orchestra
- The Nutcracker (Sugarplum Fairy, Dewdrop, Coffee)
- Romeo + Juliet (Lady Capulet)
- Polyphonia
- The Sleeping Beauty (Lilac Fairy, Carabosse, Diamond)
- Swan Lake (Balanchine)
- Swan Lake (Martins)
- Serenade
- Symphony in C (Second Movement)
- La Valse
- Vienna Waltzes

=== Created roles ===
- After the Rain
- Bal de Couture
- "Blossom Got Kissed" from Duke!
- "The Blue Necklace" from Double Feature (Dorothy Brooks)
- Les Carillons
- Double Aria
- Everywhere We Go
- The Exchange
- In Vento
- Lifecasting
- Lineage
- Luce Nascosta
- Musagète
- Prism
- Oltremare
- Organon
- Outlier
- Them Twos
- Thou Swell
- Slice to Sharp
- Variations Sérieuses
- Vespro

== Personal life ==
Kowroski is married to actor and former Royal Ballet dancer Martin Harvey. They have a son, born in 2016. Kowroski's mother died due to cancer.

== Filmography ==
Year	Title	Role	Notes
2001	Barbie in the Nutcracker	Motion capture dancer - Clara	
2001	Living a Ballet Dream	Herself	Documentary
2003	Barbie of Swan Lake	Motion capture dancer - Odette	
2006	Barbie in the 12 Dancing Princesses	Motion capture dancer - Genevieve	
2006	Dancing on Air: The Making of Barbie in The 12 Dancing Princesses	Herself	Documentary
2020	On Pointe	Herself	Documentary
