= Liturgy (disambiguation) =

Liturgy is a Christian term with several meanings:

- Christian liturgy
- Divine Liturgy

Liturgy may also refer to:

- Liturgy (ancient Greece) a public service by the richest citizens
- Liturgy (ballet), Christopher Wheeldon's ballet
- Liturgy (band), a black metal band from Brooklyn, New York
