= Sara Mearns =

American ballet dancer

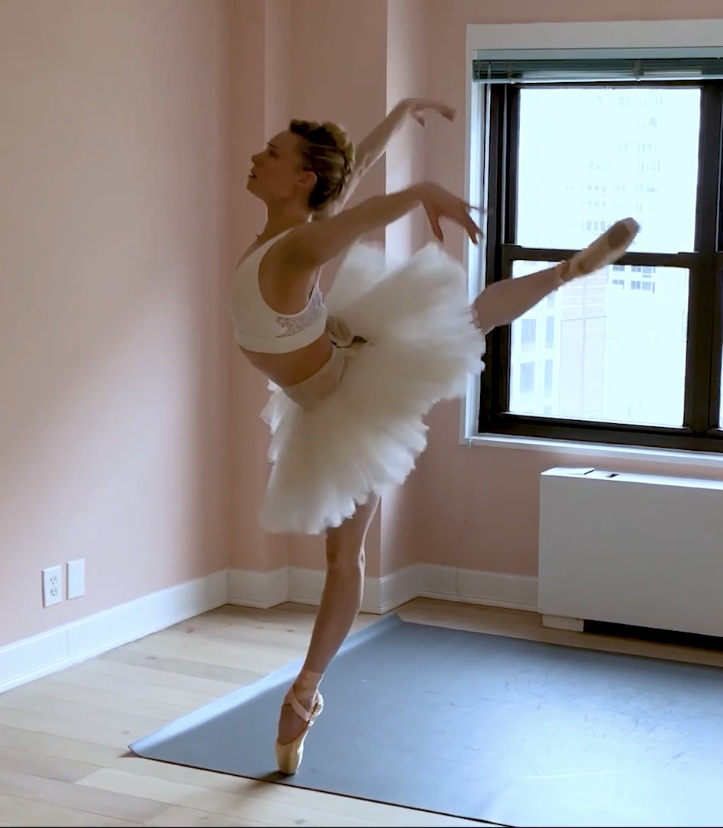
- Sara Mearns dances for Swans for Relief in May 2020
- Born: 19 January 1986 (age 40); Columbia, South Carolina, United States
- Occupation: Ballet dancer
- Years active: 2003 - present
- Spouse: Joshua Bergasse (m. 2018; div. 2024)
- Career
- Current group: New York City Ballet
- Website: saramearns.com

Sara Ann Mearns (born 19 January 1986) is an American ballet dancer. She is a principal dancer at New York City Ballet.

== Early life ==
Mearns was born in Columbia, South Carolina. Her mother is a nurse. At age three, she began dancing with Ann Brodie at the Calvert-Brodie School of Dance, also in Columbia. Mearns trained with Patricia McBride at the School of North Carolina Dance Theatre, at age 13, and at South Carolina Governor's School for the Arts and Humanities the following year. In 2001, Mearns relocated to New York to train at the School of American Ballet.

== Career ==
In 2003, Mearns became an apprentice with New York City Ballet. She was nominated for a Princess Grace Award and received the Mae L. Wien Awards that year. She became a member of the corps de ballet the following year. In 2006, at age 19 and while she was still in the corps, she was chosen to dance Odette/Odile in Swan Lake. Later that year, she was promoted to the rank of soloist, and to principal dancer two years later. She was nominated for a Prix Benois de la Danse in 2012. She was nominated for a Bessie Awards in 2014 and was awarded one in 2018.

She has danced classical roles such as the Lilac Fairy in The Sleeping Beauty, Balanchine works such as La Valse, Symphony in C, Serenade and Walpurgisnacht Ballet , as well as contemporary pieces such as Alexei Ratmansky's Concerto DSCH and Justin Peck's Rotunda.

In 2013 Mearns starred in A Dancer's Dream, a New York Philharmonic production choreographed by Karole Armitage and conducted by Alan Gilbert, which was broadcast nationally. In 2015 she made her Broadway debut in the "Lonely Town" pas de deux from the Tony-nominated musical On the Town, choreographed by Joshua Bergasse. She has also collaborated with the modern dance choreographer Jodi Melnick, resulting in the piece performed at the Guggenheim Museum in November 2016. In 2017, Mearns performed the role of Victoria Page in Matthew Bourne's The Red Shoes in New York City Center.

== Selected repertoire ==
Mearns' repertoire with the New York City Ballet includes:

- After the Rain
- An American in Paris
- Allegro Brillante
- Apollo (Polyhymnia)
- Concerto Barocco
- Concerto DSCH
- Dances at a Gathering
- The Firebird
- "Diamonds" and "Emeralds" from Jewels
- A Midsummer Night's Dream (Titania)
- The Nutcracker (Sugarplum Fairy, Dewdrop)
- Polyphonia
- Raymonda Variations
- Serenade
- The Sleeping Beauty (Carabosse, Lilac Fairy)
- Swan Lake (Balanchine version)
- Swan Lake (Martins version) (Odette/Odile, Spanish)
- Symphony in C (Second Movement)
- This Bitter Earth
- Tschaikovsky Pas de Deux
- La Valse
- Walpurgisnacht Ballet

=== Created roles ===
- The Blue of Distance
- Bright
- Les Carillons
- The Decalogue
- The Dreamers
- "Frankie and Johnny ... and Rose" from For the Love of Duke
- Jeux
- Lineage
- Namouna, A Grand Divertissement
- The Nightingale and The Rose
- Ocean's Kingdom (Honorata)
- Odessa
- Pictures at an Exhibition
- Pulcinella Variations
- The Red Violin
- Rococo Variations
- Rodeo: Four Dance Episodes
- Rotunda
- The Runaway
- The Seven Deadly Sins
- The Shimmering Asphalt
- A Simple Symphony
- SOMETHING TO DANCE ABOUT Jerome Robbins, Broadway to Ballet
- Voices
- Why am I not where you are

== Personal life ==
In November 2012, Mearns met Joshua Bergasse when she was auditioning for a featured dancing role on Smash. The dance number was cut, but the two started dating a few months later. After five years of dating, they got engaged on Valentine's Day. They were married on November 3, 2018, in Sunset Beach, North Carolina. Because Bergasse is a choreographer, they collaborate on each other's projects. They have also worked on projects together since their marriage such as Rodgers and Hart's I Married an Angel and a dance piece starring Mearns at the Fire Island Dance Festival. The couple divorced in 2024.
