= Explosions-Polka =

1847 polka by Johann Strauss II

Explosions-Polka, Op. 43, is a polka written by Johann Strauss II in 1847. The title was inspired by a discovery of guncotton or nitrocellulose by German scientist Christian Friedrich Schönbein in 1840. The Viennese press eagerly reported this discovery many years later in 1846, describing many products that can then be made 'explosive'.

The polka is one of Strauss's novelty pieces, capturing a vogue. The Explosions-Polka was written for a benefit concert entitled 'Lust-Explosionsfest' (Joyful Explosions Festival), held in the Sträussl-Säle of the Theater in der Josefstadt on 8 February 1847 during the Vienna Fasching season. It was then played to 'explosive applause' at Café Dommayer and other venues in Vienna.

The polka incorporates many explosion effects throughout the piece, and is one of the most popular early pieces of the composer. It was played at the 1974, 1990, and 2015 Vienna New Year's Concerts. George Balanchine incorporated this polka into his ballet Vienna Waltzes.
