= Damian Smith (dancer) =

Australian ballet dancer

- Born: 1972 or 1973 (age 52–53); Newcastle, New South Wales, Australia
- Education: The McDonald College; School of American Ballet
- Occupation: Ballet Dancer - Ballet School Director
- Career
- Former groups: San Francisco Ballet

Damian Smith is an Australian retired ballet dancer who was a principal dancer at the San Francisco Ballet. He is now the artistic director of The National Ballet school in Melbourne.

== Early life ==
Smith is from Newcastle, New South Wales and is of Indigenous descent. He is the youngest of six children, and his mother, a teacher, took care the children after his father died. Smith decided to start ballet at age 9, after seeing a performance, and was offered free tuition from the Robyn Hick School of Dancing. He then trained at The McDonald College in Sydney. At age 16, he accepted a scholarship to train at School of American Ballet in New York City.

== Career ==
Smith joined the San Francisco Ballet in 1998. He was promoted to soloist in 1998 and principal dancer in 2001. His repertoire includes full-length classics, works by Frederick Ashton, Kenneth MacMillan and George Balanchine, and he created roles with choreographers such as Helgi Tómasson and Christopher Wheeldon. As a guest artist, he had performed in the US, Australia, France, the UK, the Netherlands, Hong Kong and Germany.

In 2014, Smith left the San Francisco Ballet after the company's appearance in Théâtre du Châtelet, Paris. He performed at several galas afterwards. In 2016, Smith danced his final performance in Sydney. He appeared as a guest artist with The Australian Ballet to dance Wheeldon's After the Rain pas de deux with Robyn Hendricks.

Smith is currently the artistic director of The National Ballet school in Melbourne.
