= Rebecca Krohn =

American ballet dancer

- Born: 1981 or 1982 (age 44–45); Vestal, New York
- Education: School of American Ballet
- Occupations: ballet dancer; ballet master
- Years active: 1998-2017
- Spouse: Adam Hendrickson (m. 2011)
- Dancing career
- Current group: New York City Ballet

Rebecca Krohn (born 1981/1982) is an American retired ballet dancer. She danced with the New York City Ballet as a principal dancer until her retirement in 2017, then became a ballet master and served as one of the interim leaders between late 2017 and early 2019.

== Early life ==
Krohn was born and raised in Vestal, New York. She started ballet at age four after seeing The Nutcracker. Starting from age 10, she attended summer programs at the Chautauqua Ballet, which was run by Patricia McBride and Jean-Pierre Bonnefoux. In 1995, when Krohn was 14, encouraged by McBride and Bonnefoux, she entered the School of American Ballet in New York City.

== Career ==
In 1998, at age 17, Krohn became an apprentice with the New York City Ballet. Krohn joined the corps de ballet the following year, and appeared in the 2000 Center Stage as a background dancer. She became a soloist in 2006, danced in the film version of Robbins' N.Y. Export: Op. Jazz in 2010, and was promoted to principal dancer in 2012. She learned Balanchine repertory from ballet masters who worked with him, and had worked with choreographers such as Justin Peck and Benjamin Millepied. On October 7, 2017, Krohn retired from performing after a performance of in Balanchine's Stravinsky Violin Concerto, for which she danced the Aria I role.

Following her retirement, she remains in the company as a ballet master, a move inspired by her mentors, especially Karin von Aroldingen. In December, following ballet master in chief Peter Martins's departure due to sexual assault allegations, Krohn was appointed to be in the four-person interim leadership team, led by ballet master Jonathan Stafford and also consists of Justin Peck and Craig Hall. The team brought back other Balanchine veterans to coach the dancers, and Krohn also worked with them as she had never worked with Balanchine himself. In February 2019, a permanent management with Stafford as Artistic Director and Wendy Whelan as Associate Artistic Director respectively was established.

== Personal life ==
In 2011, Krohn married Adam Hendrickson, a fellow New York City Ballet dancer.
