= Edwaard Liang =

Taiwanese-American dancer and choreographer

- Born: 1975 or 1976 (age 50–51); Taipei, Taiwan
- Occupations: dancer, choreographer
- Dancing career
- Former groups: New York City Ballet

Edwaard Liang (born c. 1975/1976 in Taipei, Taiwan) is a Taiwanese-born American dancer and choreographer. He grew up in Marin County, California.

== Career ==
Liang began studying dance at the age of 5. He entered the School of American Ballet in New York City in 1989, joined New York City Ballet in 1993 and was promoted to the rank of soloist in 1998. In 2001, Liang left the New York City Ballet to dance in Fosse on Broadway. He returned to New York City Ballet from 2004 to 2007 where he danced in ballets by Jorma Elo (Slice to Sharp) and Mauro Bigonzetti (In Vento). Liang began choreographing around 2003. He created FLIGHT OF ANGELS for Nederlands Dans Theatre and in 2005 his pas de deux DISTANT CRIES was premiered at the Joyce Theatre, NYC, by Peter Boal and Wendy Whelan and was later performed by the same dancers at the New York State Theater. In July 2013 Liang became artistic director of BalletMet the professional company based in Columbus, Ohio. In 2023 he became the artistic director of The Washington Ballet.

== Awards ==
- 1993, Mae L. Wien Award.
- 2006, "25 to Watch" by Dance Magazine for choreography.
- 2006, National Choreographic Competition, winner.
- Prince Prize Grant for Choreography
- Choo San Goh Award for Choreography
- 2008, Golden Mask Award nominee for Whispers in the Dark
