= Barber Violin Concerto =

The Barber Violin Concerto is a ballet made by New York City Ballet ballet master in chief Peter Martins to Samuel Barber's Violin Concerto, Op. 14 (1939). The premiere was conducted by Robert Irving and took place on 12 May 1988 at the New York State Theater, as part of City Ballet's American Music Festival, with lighting by Jennifer Tipton and costumes by William Ivey Long. Two couples, one pair classical dancers, the other modern, perform a series of mix-and-match pas de deux. All four are dressed in white, with the classical dancers in point shoes and ballet slippers, and the modern dancers typically barefoot and the man bare-chested.

== Original Cast ==
- Merrill Ashley
- Kate Johnson
- Adam Lüders
- David Parsons

== Reviews ==
- NY Times review by Anna Kisselgoff, May 14, 1988
- NY Times review by Jack Anderson, June 21, 2005
