= Adrian Danchig-Waring =

Ballet dancer

Adrian Danchig-Waring is an American ballet dancer who is Artistic Director of New York Choreographic Institute. He was a principal dancer with New York City Ballet from 2013 through 2026.

== Early life ==
Danchig-Waring was born in northern California and first studied ballet at Dance Theatre Seven under David Roxander. He has written that "I was always dancing, so my parents enrolled me in Russian Folk Dance, because I have Russian blood on my mom’s side. I started doing gymnastics and Chinese acrobatics, and then we moved across the Golden Gate Bridge to Marin County and it just so happened there was a dance studio that had this pre-professional ball

et program, but they also had tap and jazz and modern and Afro-Haitian and pantomime, and I did it all. The one thing I was really resistant to was ballet. It was too structured for me. Free-form hippie dance, that’s what I wanted to do when I was a kid. It took me a while to mature to appreciate the regimented nature of ballet.”

== Career ==
Danchig-Waring entered the School of American Ballet in the fall of 2001. About a year later, he became an apprentice with New York City Ballet, and in June 2003 became a member of the corps de ballet. He was promoted to soloist in 2009 and to principal in 2013. Since 2014, he has collaborated with NYCB’s education department and Columbia University’s Weinberg Family Cerebral Palsy Center on the development of movement workshops for children with cerebral palsy.

Among the ballets in which his performances have received acclaim are George Balanchine's Apollo, Chaconne, Symphony in Three Movements, Agon, Serenade, Harlequinade, The Nutcracker, Kammermusik No. 2, Monumentum pro Gesualdo/Movements for Piano and Orchestra, and Episodes; Jerome Robbins's Dances at a Gathering, Afternoon of a Faun, Concertino, and Glass Pieces; Merce Cunningham Summerspace; Alexei Ratmansky's Odesa, Justin Peck's Rotunda, Lar Lubovich's Each in Their Own Time, and Pam Tanowitz's Gustave le Gray No. 1 A round-up review of NYCB's 2018 winter season in The New York Times commented that "Mr. Danchig-Waring has been a standout all season"; the article ended with, "But what stuck out the most [during the season] was the newfound brilliance of Adrian Danchig-Waring. There’s a patience in the way he holds his body that seems to stretch time. He’s so clear, so refined yet not quite of this world. Something has broken free in him, and it feels like a whiff of the spring to come." Writing in Salmagundi about Danchig-Waring's performance in Balanchine's The Four Temperaments, Jay Rogoff stated that "Adrian Danchig-Waring gives the most brilliant interpretation of Phlegmatic I have seen. Unlike most of his predecessors, who mechanically manipulate their pincer-like arms, he understands Phlegmatic as cold and moist, his entire performance suggesting a man weighed down by internal ocean. His pincer-arms recall Eliot's pair of ragged claws in silent seas, and when he reaches down, grasps his foot, and raises his leg before him, the limb's slow upward float amazes him."

Danchig-Waring was a founding member of Morphoses (originally called Morphoses/The Chirstopher Wheeldon Company), for which he danced in Wheeldon's Mesmerics; Luca Veggetti's Bacchae; and Pontus Lidberg's Labyrinth (Labyrinth Within).

Lar Lubovitch has called Danchig-Waring

a choreographer’s dancer. By that, I mean that he is able to transcend his formidable technique and use movement as a poet uses words; to describe music with his body and convey complex emotional conditions that call for arabesques and pirouettes to tell a human story beyond merely shapes and spins. That is the rarest kind of dancer.

In a Times article in anticipation of Danchig-Waring's October 18, 2026, retirement as an NYCB principal, he revealed that in late 2024 he suffered a severe bacterial infection after an epidural injection. "Danching-Waring wasn't sure if he would ever walk again, let alone dance." After a nine month course of antibiotics as well as surgery, he was able to return to performing in autumn 2025, with a plan to dance for NYCB for another year. The same article states that Danchig-Waring was previously in a relationship with NYCB principal Joseph Gordon and is now married to art advisor Thomas Rom.

Danchig-Waring is Artistic Director of the New York Choreographic Institute.
