= Opus 19/The Dreamer =

- Choreographer: Jerome Robbins
- Music: Sergei Prokofiev
- Premiere: June 14, 1979; New York State Theater
- Original ballet company: New York City Ballet
- Created for: Mikhail Baryshnikov; Patricia McBride

Opus 19/The Dreamer is a ballet choreographed by Jerome Robbins to Sergei Prokofiev's Violin Concerto No. 1. The ballet premiered on June 14, 1979 at the New York State Theater, danced by the New York City Ballet.

== Production ==
External videos
- NYC Ballet's Taylor Stanley on Jerome Robbins' OPUS 19/THE DREAMER, YouTube video
- Opus 19/The Dreamer rehearsal - ft. Dylan Wald (Pacific Northwest Ballet), YouTube video

Opus 19/The Dreamer was created for Mikhail Baryshnikov and Patricia McBride, and features an ensemble of 12 dancers. Baryshnikov joined the New York City Ballet in 1978, the year before Opus 19 was created, and soon after that he left to take over the directorship of the American Ballet Theatre. As the lead man is on stage most of the time, it is a challenge to the dancer's stamina.

In a 2019 interview, Baryshnikov said he could not recall the details of the creation process, but Robbins wanted "to dance everything himself in sneakers and jeans. All those jumps. He always had to try everything." Baryshnikov also said the ballet has "no story and yet it’s a reflection of the music — he sits, she dances, and she sits, he dances." Though Baryshnikov rarely coaches, he worked with New York City Ballet dancers Gonzalo Garcia and Taylor Stanley on the lead role. Garcia described the ballet as "an artistic journey."

In 2020, in response to performance cancellations due to the coronavirus, New York City Ballet released a video of Opus 19/The Dreamer's first movement online, featuring Unity Phelan in her role debut and Garcia, filmed earlier that year. The Pacific Northwest Ballet had also performed the ballet.
