= David Earl (composer) =

South African composer and pianist

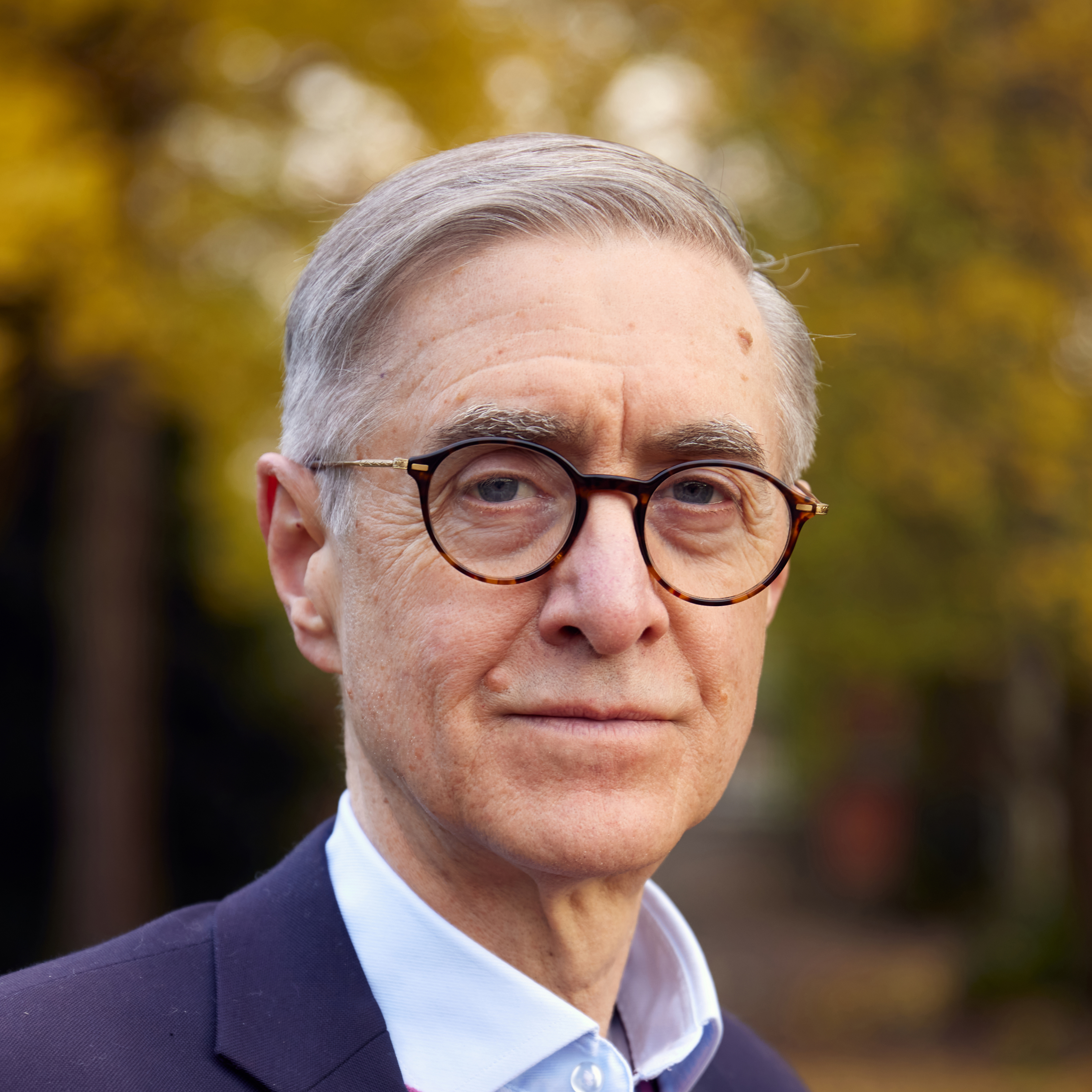
- David Earl in December 2022
- Born: 1951 (age 74–75); Stellenbosch, Cape Province, Union of South Africa
- Occupations: Composer, pianist
- Years active: 1966–present

David Earl (born 1951) is a South African composer and pianist, who now teaches in the UK. His works include ballet and opera, multiple orchestral concertos and much chamber and solo piano music.

== Education and performance career ==
Earl was educated at Rondebosch Boys' High School in Cape Town. He made his professional debut at the age of 16, broadcasting works by Bach, Chopin, and Chabrier on the South African Broadcasting Corporation (SABC). In 1968, he performed Felix Mendelssohn's Piano Concerto No. 1 with the Cape Town Symphony Orchestra. In 1971, Earl relocated to London to study at the Trinity College of Music under Jacob Kaletsky and Richard Arnell.

Following a live debut broadcast recital on BBC Radio 3 in 1974 Earl made his recital debut at the Wigmore Hall, which The Times described as "stylish and powerful." In 1975, the Greater London Arts Association selected him as one of the Young Musicians of the Year. The following year, he won first prize in the 1976 SABC Piano Competition. As a soloist, Earl's concerto repertoire includes Viennese classics, 19th-century works, and 20th-century concertos by Arthur Bliss and John Joubert, both of whom he studied with directly. He has performed under conductors including Hugo Rignold, Maurice Handford, Piero Gamba, and Christian Badea. Earl spent seven years teaching piano performance at Oxford in the 1990s, and now teaches at Cambridge University where he is a supervisor for Tripos Composition students. Earl performed his 24 Oxymorons preludes on a SOMM CD issued in 2026.

== Composition ==
Earl made his debut as a composer in 1977 when he premiered his own Piano Suite No. 1 (Mosaics) at the Wigmore Hall. His professional career as a composer grew significantly in 1980 with the premiere of Chéri an hour-long ballet commissioned by Peter Darrell for The Scottish Ballet. The work debuted at the Edinburgh Festival, received frequent revivals, and was staged in a new production by The Hong Kong Ballet in 1989. Earl has received six additional ballet commissions. Notable works include The Return of the Soldier (1982) and Abelard and Heloise (1985), both for the CAPAB Ballet, choreographed by Veronica Paeper, as well as a full-evening production of Macbeth (1991). More recently Eael has collaborated with Royal Ballet choreographer Vanessa Fenton on two smaller works mounted in Cambridge in 2009.

The Piano Concerto No. 1 appeared in 1980, followed by the Concerto for Two Pianos and Orchestra in 1983. There followed many other concertos, for Violin (1991), Cello (1996), Trumpet (2005), the Piano Concerto No 2 (2007) and a Double Violin Concerto (2011). A new Clarinet Concerto was premiered in October 2013 in Durban, South Africa, with Maria du Toit, clarinet, and the KwaZuluNatal Philharmonic Orchestra under Arjan Tien. A Carbon Symphony was recorded by The Royal Scottish National Orchestral in October 2019, in collaboration with The Deep Carbon Observatory in Washington DC.

Chamber works include two sonatas each for violin and cello, a Clarinet Trio, Piano Quintet, String Quartet and Piano Sextet. Earl has often collaborated with young musicians at the start of their careers – Tasmin Little, Martin Roscoe, Alexander Chaushian and Jamie Campbell gave the first performances of, respectively, the Violin Concerto, Violin Sonata No 1, the Cello Concerto, and the Violin Sonata No. 2. He has also continued to write for solo piano, including three Suites - Mosaics, Gargoyles and Mandalas, as well as Oxymorons: 24 Preludes. Recordings of the Cello Sonata and the Mandalas Piano Suite received a Gramophone Editor's recommendation rossette, and was nominated by International Piano magazine for best new music recording 2007. In 2017 two new works were premiered: the Piano Suite No 4 Darshanas, and a Duo Sonata for Viola and Double Bass, the latter a commission from the South African double bass virtuoso Leon Bosch, for whom David has also written Nocturne: Old Nectar for Bass and Piano.

Among choral compositions is a symphonic setting of Wordsworth's 'Intimations of Immortality', a cyclic setting of George Herbert 'Mans' Medley', and 'Island Owl' for soloists, children's chorus and orchestra. In June 2012 his setting of Rupert Brooke's 'The Old Vicarage, Grantchester' for baritone chorus and orchestra, commissioned by Dame Mary Archer to mark the poem's centenary, was given its first performance at the Fitzwilliam Museum, Cambridge, with the Cambridge University Chamber Orchestra, members of the choirs of Clare and Gonville and Caius College, and Nicholas Mogg as baritone soloist. A setting of Stephen Spender's poem The Truly Great was composed for Anglia Ruskin University's 25th Anniversary Songbook in 2017. A song cycle for baritone and piano, Sangharakshita Songs, was premiered in Cambridge in October 2018.

His interest in dramatic music began with film and more recently extended into opera. Earl was introduced to the world of writing film music by the producer David Puttnam and wrote for a number of productions between 1982 and 1987, in particular P'Tang Yang Kipperbang (directed by Michael Apted), and Arthur's Hallowed Ground (directed by the veteran cinematographer Freddie Young). He has completed two full length operas: Mary and the Conqueror, in which Alexander the Great and Mary Renault meet in the afterlife; and Strange Ghost, composed to mark the centenary of the death of the iconic poet Rupert Brooke. The latter was premiered in Cambridge in December 2015, directed by Dionysios Kyropoulos, and conducted by Dominic Peckham with James Schouten in the title role. A new opera, Lawrence of Arabia, was completed in 2021.

== Buddhist influence ==
In 2001 he was ordained into the then Western Buddhist Order (now Triratna Buddhist Order) and given the Order name of Akashadeva ('deity of etheric space'). Many of his musical compositions show influences from this immersion in Buddhist thinking, such as the piano suite Mandalas, whose four movements are inspired among others by the vajras of Indian mythology, the lotus symbol and the Five Dhyani Buddhas that represent the five key qualities of the Buddha. In 2019 the Buddhist influenced piano piece Metta Bhavana was commissioned for the second Triennial Olga Kern International Piano Competition in Albuquerque, New Mexico.

== Filmography ==
- P'Tang Yang Kipperbang, 1984
- The Price, 1985
- Arthur's Hallowed Ground, 1986

== Ballets ==
- Ballet in one act: Chéri (1978)
- Ballet in one act: Return of the Soldier (1980–81)
- Ballet in one act: Abelard and Heloise (1983)
- Ballet in one act: The Nightingale and the Rose (1983)
- Ballet in two acts: Macbeth (1991)
- Dance theatre: Highland Journal (1995)
- Ballet: Wind and Wings (2009)
- Ballet: Ode to Memory (2009)

== Dramatic ==
- Incidental music for Dance of the Defectors (Lot's Wife) (1983–84)
- Opera in two acts: Hamlet (1984)
- Opera in two acts: The Go-Between (1991)
- Mary and the Conqueror (2013)
- Strange Ghost (2015)
- Lawrence of Arabia (2021)

== Concertante and orchestral ==
- Piano Concerto No 1 (1977–78)
- Concerto for Two Pianos and Orchestra (1983)
- Violin Concerto No 1 (1985)
- Cello Concerto (1994)
- Trumpet Concerto (2005)
- Piano Concerto No. 2 (2006)
- Double Violin Concerto (2011)
- Clarinet Concerto (2013)
- The Wineland Suite for orchestra (and version for brass/woodwind) (2014)
- Violin Concerto No 2 (2014)
- Concerto for Double Bass and Orchestra (2015)
- Viola Concerto (2015)
- Symphony in C - a Carbon Symphony (2019)
- Piano Concerto No. 3 (2020)
- Concertino for Three Saxophones and Orchestra (2026)

== Chamber and Instrumental ==
- Piano Suite No 1, Mosaics (1977)
- Piano Suite No 2, Gargoyles (1986–89)
- 3 Intermezzi for piano, Caryatids (1991)
- Sonata No 1 for violin and piano (1991)
- 24 Preludes for Piano: Oxymorons (1993)
- Piano Suite No 3, Mandalas (1996)
- Sonata No 2 for violin and piano (1997)
- Sonata for cello and piano (1998)
- Invocation to Manjughosa – for violin and piano (2002)
- Theme and Variations – transcription for piano of the 4th movement from Tchaikovsky's Suite No 3 Op 55 (2002)
- Old Roses for solo piano (2008)
- Trio for clarinet, cello and piano (2008)
- Quintet for piano and strings (2008)
- Wind and Wings for wind trio and harp (2009)
- Sonata for oboe and piano (2009)
- Sonatina for Piano (2009)
- Ode to Memory for string quartet, clarinet, flute and harp (2009)
- String Quartet (2010)
- Nocturne for cello and piano (2010)
- Chios Rhapsody for solo piano (2010)
- Jonathan's Grace Notes – four easy pieces for piano (2010)
- The Fairy Garden – five easy pieces for flute and piano (2011)
- Sonata No. 2 for cello and piano (2011)
- Encore – piano variations on Chopsticks (2012)
- From hearts that live in grace – waltzes for piano (2012)
- Scenes from Childhood – 9 pieces for piano solo (2012)
- Scenes from a South African Childhood - 9 pieces for solo piano (2013)
- Sonata for viola and piano (2014)
- Quintet for Cor Anglais and strings (2014)
- Barcarolle - solo piano (2014)
- Song without Words - solo piano (2014)
- Duo Sonata for Viola and Double Bass (2016)
- Piano Suite No 4, Darshanas (2016)
- Sextet for piano and strings (2018)
- Metta Bhavana for solo piano (2019)
- 15 Bagatelles for cello, clarinet and piano (2020)
- Nocturne - Old Nectar for double bass and piano, also arranged for double bass, wind quartet and harp; and for full orchestra (2022)
- Quartet for Piano and Strings (2023)

== Choral and vocal ==
- Lord, make me an instrument of Thy peace – setting of St Francis of Assisi for SATB (1979)
- I will lift up mine eyes unto the hills – Psalm 121 for soprano and piano (1984)
- Choral Symphony, Trumpets from the Steep (1987)
- Man's Medley – choral and orchestral settings of George Herbert (1993)
- To a Nobleman in Kyoto – settings of Kukai for baritone and piano (1997)
- Praise the Lord for all our parents (SATB with organ; also SATB with orchestra) (2008)
- Island Owl: songs for children of all ages for vocal soloists, chorus and orchestra (2010)
- Ode on a Grecian Urn (Keats) – for soprano and piano (2010)
- The Ungathered Blossom of Quiet – a Rupert Brooke song cycle for tenor and piano (2011)
- The Old Vicarage, Grantchester (2012) for baritone, chorus and orchestra
- The Truly Great (Stephen Spender setting for tenor and piano/chorus and orchestra 2018)
- Sangharakshita Poems - a cycle of 8 songs for baritone and piano (2018)
- Sussex - a setting of Rudyard Kipling's poem for SATB and Piano; also arranged for SATB and string orchestra (2025)
