= Jock Soto =

American ballet dancer

- Born: 1965 (age 59–60); Gallup, New Mexico, U.S.
- Occupation: Principal dancer for the New York City Ballet

Jock Soto (born 1965) is a former American ballet dancer and current ballet instructor.

== Career ==
Jock Soto danced featured roles in over 40 ballets, of which more than 35 were created for him.

While a student at the School of American Ballet (SAB) he danced the role of Luke in Peter Martins' The Magic Flute, which was choreographed for SAB's 1981 workshop performances. It transferred to the New York City Ballet, and he retained his role. He joined New York City Ballet in 1981 and made his debut as Luke in The Magic Flute the following January. He was promoted to soloist in 1984 and to principal dancer in 1985.

Soto danced the role of a parent in the 1993 film version of The Nutcracker, a version based on the New York City Ballet production choreographed by George Balanchine.

He gave his farewell performance on Sunday, June 19, 2005. The program featured ballets by five different choreographers: "Dance at the Gym" from Jerome Robbins' West Side Story Suite, Peter Martins' Barber Violin Concerto, Christopher Wheeldon's Liturgy, Lynne Taylor-Corbett's Chiaroscuro, and the Royal Navy section of George Balanchine's Union Jack.

He has been a permanent member of the faculty at SAB since 1996, where he teaches partnering and technique classes to intermediate and advanced students. He also has pursued a "culinary career".

== Personal life ==
Soto was born in Gallup, New Mexico, and raised in Phoenix, Arizona. His parents are Puerto Rican and Navajo. Soto is openly gay. He had a long-term relationship with choreographer Christopher Wheeldon, with whom he also had a critically lauded professional relationship. In June 2003, Soto met chef/sommelier Luis Fuentes and began a relationship with him. Soto and Fuentes were married in New York on October 14, 2011; their wedding was featured in The New York Times' "Vows" column.

== Filmography ==
- The Nutcracker (1993)
- Water Flowing Together (2007), an award-winning documentary film about Jock Soto, directed and produced by Gwendolen Cates. Premiered on PBS Independent Lens April 2008.

== Books ==
- "Every Step You Take" (2011), HarperCollins
- "Our Meals" (a cookbook) with Heather Watts
