= Luca Veggetti =

Italian dancer and choreographer

Luca Veggetti is an Italian dancer and choreographer. He was born in Bologna, Italy and trained at La Scala in Milan under I. Glowacka and G. Popescu. After his career as a dancer at London Festival Ballet, Pennsylvania Ballet and Ballet Chicago, Veggetti started an ongoing collaboration with Pier Luigi Pizzi as a choreographer and assistant. In 1999, Veggetti became the first Italian choreographer of the 20th century to be invited to work with the legendary Kirov Ballet at the Marinsky in Saint Petersburg.

Future engagements include new pieces for Cedar Lake Contemporary Ballet, Rome Opera and Purchase New York, as well as a new staging of Toshio Hosokawa's opera Hanjo, at the Suntory Hall in Tokyo.
