= The Nutcracker (Balanchine) =

Balanchine's 1954 version of The Nutcracker

Choreographer George Balanchine's production of Petipa and Tchaikovsky's 1892 ballet The Nutcracker is an acclaimed and popular version of the ballet that is now widely performed. Created for the New York City Ballet, its premiere took place on February 2, 1954, at City Center, New York, with costumes by Karinska, sets by Horace Armistead, and lighting and production by Jean Rosenthal. The work was reconceived for the much larger stage and more elaborate technical capabilities of Lincoln Center's New York State Theater in 1964.

With the exception of the 2020 COVID-19 pandemic, Balanchine's The Nutcracker has been performed by New York City Ballet every holiday season since 1954. In addition, many other productions throughout the United States and elsewhere either imitate it or make direct use of its staging and choreography.

== Staging ==
In contrast to other productions of the ballet, Balanchine's production of The Nutcracker uses more children, and give the principal roles of Clara/Marie and Drosselmeyer's Nephew/Nutcracker/Prince to children instead of adults. This also causes the choreography for these characters to be simplified, and they largely only appear in the second act of the ballet as observers, except for the Prince's re-enactment of their fight with the Mouse King.

This production also changes out the Journey Through the Snow pas de deux; instead Clara/Marie faints onto her bed during the Mouse King battle and the bed moves across the stage while the Nutcracker transforms into the Prince, who awakens Clara/Marie and escorts her offstage.

== Reception and impact ==
Balanchine's The Nutcracker has been lauded since its inaugural Lincoln Center season, when Allen Hughes wrote in The New York Times, "Could a child wish for a more enchanting entertainment during the holiday season? I doubt it. I doubt, too, that many adults who see the magnificent new production that opened yesterday at Lincoln Center will fail to reflect wistfully on the joy of being able to see - as a child would see it - so exquisite an incarnation of the world of makebelieve." More recently, Alastair Macaulay wrote in the Times that Balanchine's version of The Nutcracker is "in most respects the one that best shows the ballet's dimensions." Laura Jacobs, writing in Vanity Fair, called the work a "stunningly successful achievement... the Nutcracker that launched the hundreds of Nutcracker ballets that now dominate America's Decembers."

== On the screen ==
The first televised performance aired on CBS in 1957 on the TV anthology The Seven Lively Arts; while Balanchine's archives refer to it as complete, it was abridged to 55 minutes long. This was the first TV broadcast of any version of the ballet.

CBS's Playhouse 90 broadcast a more complete (but still abridged) version narrated by actress June Lockhart, on December 25, 1958; it was the first Nutcracker (and only installment of the entire Playhouse 90 series) broadcast in color. This production featured Balanchine himself as Drosselmeyer.

Excerpts from the Balanchine production were performed several times on several television variety shows of the mid-20th century, notably The Bell Telephone Hour and The Ed Sullivan Show.

The complete Balanchine version was eventually made into a full-length feature film in 1993, and starred Macaulay Culkin in his only screen ballet role, as the Nutcracker, the Prince, and Drosselmeyer's nephew. The film was directed by Emile Ardolino, with narration by Kevin Kline. Ardolino died of AIDS only a few days before the film's release.

In 2011, PBS presented that season's Balanchine Nutcracker as part of their ongoing series Live from Lincoln Center. Directed by Alan Skog, it marked the first U.S. televised broadcast of the Balanchine version in over fifty years. It was nominated for an Emmy Award in 2012.

== Casts ==
| | 1954 NYCB | 1958 Television | 1993 Movie | 2011 Television |
|---|---|---|---|---|
| Clara/Marie | Alberta Grant | Bonnie Bedelia | Jessica Lynn Cohen | Fiona Brennan |
| Nephew/Nutcracker/Prince | Paul Nickel | Robert Maiorano | Macaulay Culkin | Colby Clark |
| Drosselmeyer | Michael Arshansky | George Balanchine | Bart Cook | Adam Hendrickson |
| Sugar Plum Fairy | Maria Tallchief | Diana Adams | Darci Kistler | Megan Fairchild |
| Cavalier | Nicholas Magallanes | none | Damian Woetzel | Joaquin De Luz |
| Hot Chocolate | Yvonne Mounsey | Barbara Walczak Roy Tobias | Lourdes López Nilas Martins | Adrian Danchig-Waring Brittany Pollack |
| Coffee | Francisco Moncion | Arthur Mitchell | Wendy Whelan | Teresa Reichlen |
| Tea | George Li | Deni Lamont | Gen Horiuchi | Antonio Carmena |
| Candy Cane | Robert Barnett | Edward Villella | Tom Gold | Daniel Ulbricht |
| Marzipan | Janet Reed | Judith Green | Margaret Tracey | Tiler Peck Mary Elizabeth Sell |
| Mother Ginger | Edward Bigelow | Bengt Andersson | William Otto | Andrew Scordato |
| Dewdrop | Tanaquil Le Clercq | Allegra Kent | Kyra Nichols | Ashley Bouder |

== Music ==
Balanchine adds to Tchaikovsky's score an entr'acte (music played between acts in a performance) that the composer wrote for Act II of The Sleeping Beauty, but which is now seldom played in productions of that ballet. In Balanchine's Nutcracker, it is used as a transition between the departure of the guests and the battle with the mice. During this transition, the mother of Marie (as she is usually called in this version) appears in the living room and throws a blanket over the girl, who has crept downstairs and fallen asleep on the sofa; then Drosselmeyer appears, repairs the Nutcracker, and binds the jaw with a handkerchief. In addition, the Dance Of The Sugar Plum Fairy is moved from near the end of Act II to near the beginning of the second act, just after the Sugar Plum Fairy makes her first appearance. To help the musical transition, the tarantella that comes before the dance is cut. In the 1993 film version of the Balanchine version, just as in the telecast of the Baryshnikov one, the Miniature Overture is cut in half, and the opening credits are seen as the overture is heard. The film's final credits feature a reprise of the Trepak (Russian dance) and the Waltz of the Flowers.
