= Craig Hall (dancer) =

American ballet dancer (born 1979)

- Born: Maywood, Illinois, U.S.
- Education: Chicago Academy for the Arts; School of American Ballet
- Spouse: Frank Wildermann
- Dancing career
- Current group: New York City Ballet

Craig Hall (born c. 1979) is an American ballet dancer. He danced with the New York City Ballet as a soloist until 2016 then became a repertory director, and was one of the company interim leaders between late 2017 and early 2019.

== Early life ==
Hall was born in Maywood, Illinois, and started dance training at age 4. At age 14, he entered the Chicago Academy for the Arts. When he was 18, in 1997, he moved to New York City to train at the School of American Ballet full-time, having previously attended two summer intensives there. In 1999, prior to his graduation, he originated a featured role in Christopher Wheeldon's Scènes de ballet. He also received the Mae L. Wien Awards for Outstanding Promise that year.

== Career ==
In October 1999, Hall became an apprentice at the New York City Ballet, and became a member of the corps de ballet 4 months later. In 2007, he was promoted to soloist. Throughout his career, he had danced works by George Balanchine and Jerome Robbins, and originated roles in works by Wheeldon, Justin Peck, Wayne McGregor and Jorma Elo.

In 2011, Hall was chosen by his colleagues to dance the title role in Apollo, as a part of the company's Dancers' Choice, and is the first African American dancer in the company to dance this role, though he did not reprise the role again. He is also a frequent partner of principal dancer Wendy Whelan. In her farewell performance, he danced with her in the After the Rain pas de deux, as well as in a new work by Wheeldon and Alexei Ratmansky, titled By 2 With & From. Hall had performed with Wheeldon's company, Morphoses/The Wheeldon Company.

In 2016, following a performance of the After the Rain pas de deux at the Lincoln Center and some tour engagements, Hall stepped down as a dancer, but he planned to accept some dance engagements afterwards. Initially, he was not planning to be involved with ballet following his retirement, but he was invited to be one of Peck's répétiteurs. Hall then became a ballet master at NYCB and staged Peck's works for both NYCB and other companies. Hall joined School of American Ballet's faculty in 2018, after staging Peck's In Creases for the school's workshop performances. He also coached Taylor Stanley, another dancer of color, for his debut in Apollo.

In December 2017, Peter Martins, then ballet master in chief of NYCB, took a leave of absence and later left after he was accused of sexual abuse. That month, Hall was chosen to be in the four-person interim leadership team, led by ballet master Jonathan Stafford, and also consisted of Peck and fellow ballet master Rebecca Krohn. The team managed the company until February 2019, when Stafford and Whelan were appointed artistic director and Associate Artistic Director respectively.

In November 2019, Hall performed at the American Music Awards. Hall danced with American Ballet Theatre principal dancer Misty Copeland during Taylor Swift's performance of "Lover" in a medley, on the occasion of Swift receiving the Artist of the Decade award.

Hall performed in 2025 for vildwerk., a nonprofit organization which aims to increase environmental conservation awareness through dance, at New York Live Arts for their Dancing for Our Wonderful World program. Hall performed in Christopher Wheeldon's After the Rain with Isabella Boylston.

== Personal life ==
Hall is married to Frank Wildermann, a yoga instructor. They live in Carroll Gardens, Brooklyn. Outside of ballet, Hall is a photographer.

== Awards and honors ==
- 1999: Mae L. Wien Awards
