= Holly Hynes =

American ballet costume designer

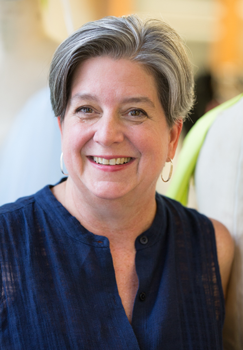
Holly Hynes

Holly Hynes is an American costume designer for ballets to her credit, including at the New York City Ballet. She was resident costumer designer at the Suzanne Farrell Ballet at The John F. Kennedy Center for the Performing Arts for 19 years.

== Career ==
Hynes served as the Director of Costumes for New York City Ballet. Hynes has assisted companies including the Royal Danish Ballet in Copenhagen, Denmark; Ballet de l'Opéra National de Paris, France; Théâtre du Capitole, Toulouse, France; The Bavarian State Ballet, Munich, Germany; The Cincinnati Ballet, Ohio; San Francisco Ballet, California; The Birmingham Royal Ballet, Birmingham, England; The Royal Ballet, London, England; Miami City Ballet, Florida; La Scala Theatre Ballet, Milan, Italy; Dutch National Ballet, Amsterdam; Hamburg Ballet, Germany; Staatsballett Berlin, Germany; and the Mariinsky Ballet, Saint Petersburg, Russia.

Hynes' theatrical designs include two Broadway productions at Circle in the Square Theatre: On Borrowed Time, directed by George C. Scott, and George Bernard Shaw's Getting Married, as well as a dozen plays and musicals at the off-Broadway York Theatre. Her opera designs include La Gioconda and the Metropolitan Opera in New York, including Christopher Wheeldon's "Dance of the Hours"; and The Music Master, Gerard Schwarz, conducting. She has designed several productions for Theater for Young Audiences, based at The John F. Kennedy Center, including the national tour of Quiara Alegria Hudes' Barrio Grrrl!

Her designs for Ulysses Dove's Red Angels at New York City Ballet, George Balanchine's Divertimento No. 15 for Suzanne Farrell Ballet at the Kennedy Center and Kaleidoscope for Peter Quanz at American Ballet Theatre were featured on covers of Dance Magazine.

Four of her costume renderings are part of the permanent collection of the Theatre Wing of the Museum of the City of New York. She has exhibited renderings and watercolors in two gallery shows at Avery Fisher Hall at Lincoln Center for the Performing Arts and has had six of her costumes featured on covers of the 1994-95 New York State Theater Playbills, also at Lincoln Center. Hynes' designs for six miniature ballerina dolls were featured in the 1996 Christmas decorations at the White House and will remain in the permanent collection of the President William Jefferson Clinton Library in Little Rock, Arkansas. In 1997, she was honored with a one-woman show of her costumes, sketches, and photographs at the Marvin Cone Galleries, at Coe College, her alma mater, located in Cedar Rapids, Iowa. From 2008 to 2009, three of her costumes for dance were featured in "CURTAIN CALL: Celebrating a Century of Women Designing for Live Performance," an exhibition shown at the Lincoln Center Library for the Performing Arts, New York, NY.

Hynes was one of four behind-the-scenes ballet artists selected to be featured in "Beyond the Stage Door" an interactive exhibition presented by the Philadelphia Ballet in 2022. In May 2007, her thoughts on designing for the ballet were archived in a video titled, "Speaking of Dancing" for the Jerome Robbins dance division of the New York Public Library for the Performing Arts in New York City. In 2017, Hynes was featured in the podcast presented by former 1010 WINS anchor and personality.

== Awards ==
Hynes received the 2018 Theater Development Fund/Irene Sharaff Lifetime Achievement Award at the Edison Ballroom in New York City, on April 20, 2018. Prima Ballerina Wendy Whelan presented Hynes with the honor.

== Personal life ==
Hynes is originally from Des Moines, Iowa and attended Coe College. She lives in New Jersey with her husband, Jim Zulakis. They have two children.
