= Sofiane Sylve =

French ballet dancer

- Born: 1976 (age 49–50); Nice, France
- Education: Académie de Danse
- Occupation: Ballet dancer
- Career
- Former groups: Karlsruhe Stadttheater; Dutch National Ballet; New York City Ballet; San Francisco Ballet; Ballet San Antonio

Sofiane Sylve (born 1976) is a French ballet dancer. She is a principal dancer and ballet master with the Dresden Semperoper Ballett. She was previously a principal dancer with Dutch National Ballet, New York City Ballet and San Francisco Ballet. She was previously the artistic advisor and school director of Ballet San Antonio.

== Biography ==
Sylve was born in Nice, France. She started ballet at the age of 4 and trained at Académie de Danse. After she was discovered at a competition, she joined the Badisches Staatstheater in Karlsruhe, Germany, when she was 14. Shortly after that, Patricia Neary cast her as the lead in the George Balanchine ballet Allegro Brillante. Neary then recommended Sylve join Dutch National Ballet, which had more Balanchine repertoire. At age 17, she danced the title role in Cinderella. She was promoted to principal dancer and was offered a lifetime contract at age 20, and danced roles including Aurora in The Sleeping Beauty, as well as works by Balanchine and Frederick Ashton. In 2003, the New York City Ballet invited Sylve to join the company, and she accepted the position several months later.

Sylve joined the San Francisco Ballet as a principal dancer in 2008. In 2020, Sylve joined Dresden Semperoper Ballett as principal dancer and ballet master. In 2020, she was also appointed Artistic Advisor of Ballet San Antonio. And as of 2022, Sylve became both Artistic Director of Ballet San Antonio and Director of the School of Ballet San Antonio.

Sylve completed and received her Management Essentials and Leadership Principles certificates from the Harvard Business School Online.
