= Dances at a Gathering =

Ballet by Jerome Robbins

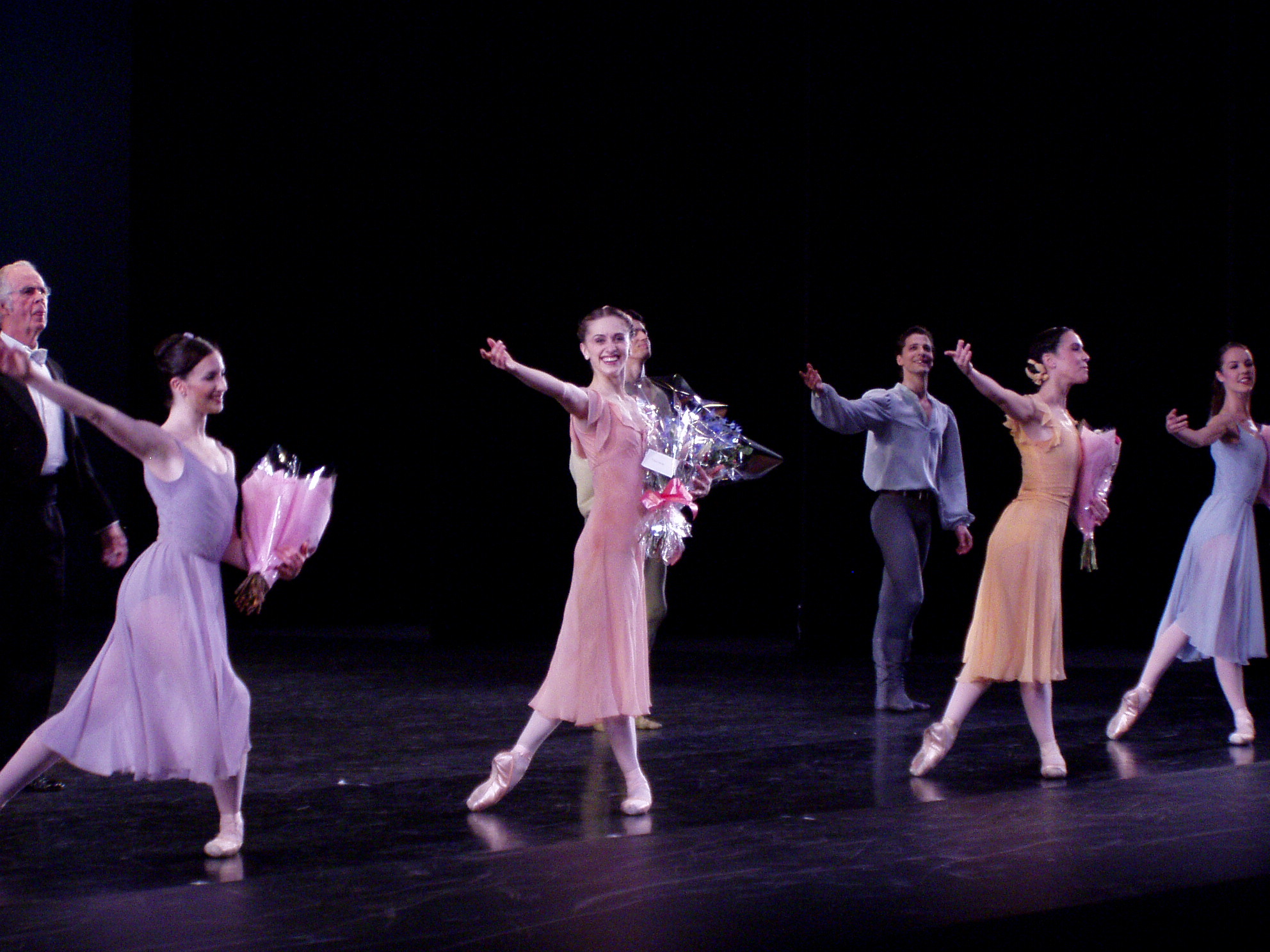
- Royal Ballet dancers at the curtain call of Dances at a Gathering (2008)
- Choreographer: Jerome Robbins
- Music: Frédéric Chopin
- Premiere: May 22, 1969; New York State Theater
- Original ballet company: New York City Ballet
- Design: Joe Eula
- Genre: Neoclassical ballet

Dances at a Gathering is a ballet choreographed by Jerome Robbins to music by Frédéric Chopin, with costumes designed by Joe Eula. The ballet premiered on May 22, 1969, at the New York State Theater, performed by the New York City Ballet.

== Production ==
Dances at a Gathering is the first ballet Robbins created for the New York City Ballet (NYCB) in years, after he worked on Broadway theatre. He first planned to make a pas de deux for Patricia McBride and Edward Villella, but it was eventually expanded to five couples. According to NYCB, after George Balanchine saw 25 minutes of the ballet, he said: "[m]ake more, make it like popcorn", so Robbins enlarged the ballet to an hour long. With costumes by Joe Eula and lighting by Thomas Skelton, the ballet had a gala preview on May 8, 1969, before premiering on May 22. Robbins dedicated the ballet to lighting designer Jean Rosenthal, who had died on May 1.

Following the premiere, there were many speculations regarding the narratives of the ballet so Robbins wrote to Ballet Review in all caps to insist that the ballet has no stories, plot or roles, and the dancers are merely "themselves dancing with each other to music in that place." In the ballet, the performers are credited by the colors of their costumes. The ballet starts with a solo performed by Brown Boy, originally Villella, and in the middle of the ballet, a woman who had not appeared in the ballet before dances a solo. In one section featuring three men and three women, the women are tossed from partner to partner. The most well-known part of the ballet is a pas de deux between Pink Girl (originally McBride) and Mauve Boy. No more than six dancers are on stage at the same time until the finale.

== Other companies and revivals ==
The Royal Ballet in London premiered Dances at a Gathering in 1970, staged by Robbins himself. When he taught the role originated by Villella to Rudolf Nureyev, who was regarded as one of the best ballet dancer in his generation, Robbins attempted to make Nureyev unrecognizable to the audience. The Royal Ballet continued to perform the ballet until 1976, then did not revive it until 2008, staged by Susan Hendl and Ben Huys. Robbins also staged the ballet for the Paris Opera Ballet, and the company debuted it in 1991. The San Francisco Ballet first performed it in 2002, also staged by Hendl and Huys.

In 2014, when original cast member Patricia McBride was honored at the Kennedy Center Honors, an excerpt of Dances at a Gathering was performed by Tiler Peck and Jared Angle.

== Casts ==
- World premiere: Allegra Kent, Sara Leland, Kay Mazzo, Patricia McBride, Violette Verdy, Anthony Blum, John Clifford, Robert Maiorano, John Prinz, Edward Villella
- Royal Ballet premiere (1970): Laura Connor, Ann Jenner, Monica Mason, Lynn Seymour, Antoinette Sibley, Michael Coleman, Anthony Dowell, Jonathan Kelly, Rudolf Nureyev, David Wall
- Paris Opera Ballet premiere (1991): Monique Loudières, Marie-Claude Pietragalla, Isabelle Guérin, Claude de Vulpian, Véronique Doisneau, Manuel Legris, Kader Belarbi, Jean-Yves Lormeau, Patrick Dupond, Wilfred Romoli
- San Francisco Ballet premiere (2002): Sherri LeBlanc, Tina LeBlanc, Joanna Berman, Lucía Lacarra, Yuan Yuan Tan, Stephen Legate, Gonzalo Garcia, Damian Smith, Vadim Solomakha, Roman Rykine

== Music ==
All the music used in Dances at a Gathering is composed by Frédéric Chopin, including:

- Mazurka, Op. 63, No. 3
- Waltz, Op. 69, No. 2
- Mazurka, Op. 33, No. 3
- Mazurka, Op. 6, No. 4
- Mazurka, Op. 7, No. 5
- Mazurka, Op. 7, No. 4
- Mazurka, Op. 24, No. 2
- Mazurka, Op. 6, No. 2
- Waltz, Op. 42
- Waltz, Op. 34, No. 2
- Mazurka, Op. 56, No. 2
- Etude, Op. 25, No. 4
- Waltz, Op. 34, No. 1
- Waltz, Op. 70, No. 2
- Etude, Op. 25, No. 5
- Etude, Op. 10, No. 2
- Scherzo, Op. 20
- Nocturne, Op. 15, No. 1
