= Wendy Whelan =

American ballet dancer (born 1967)

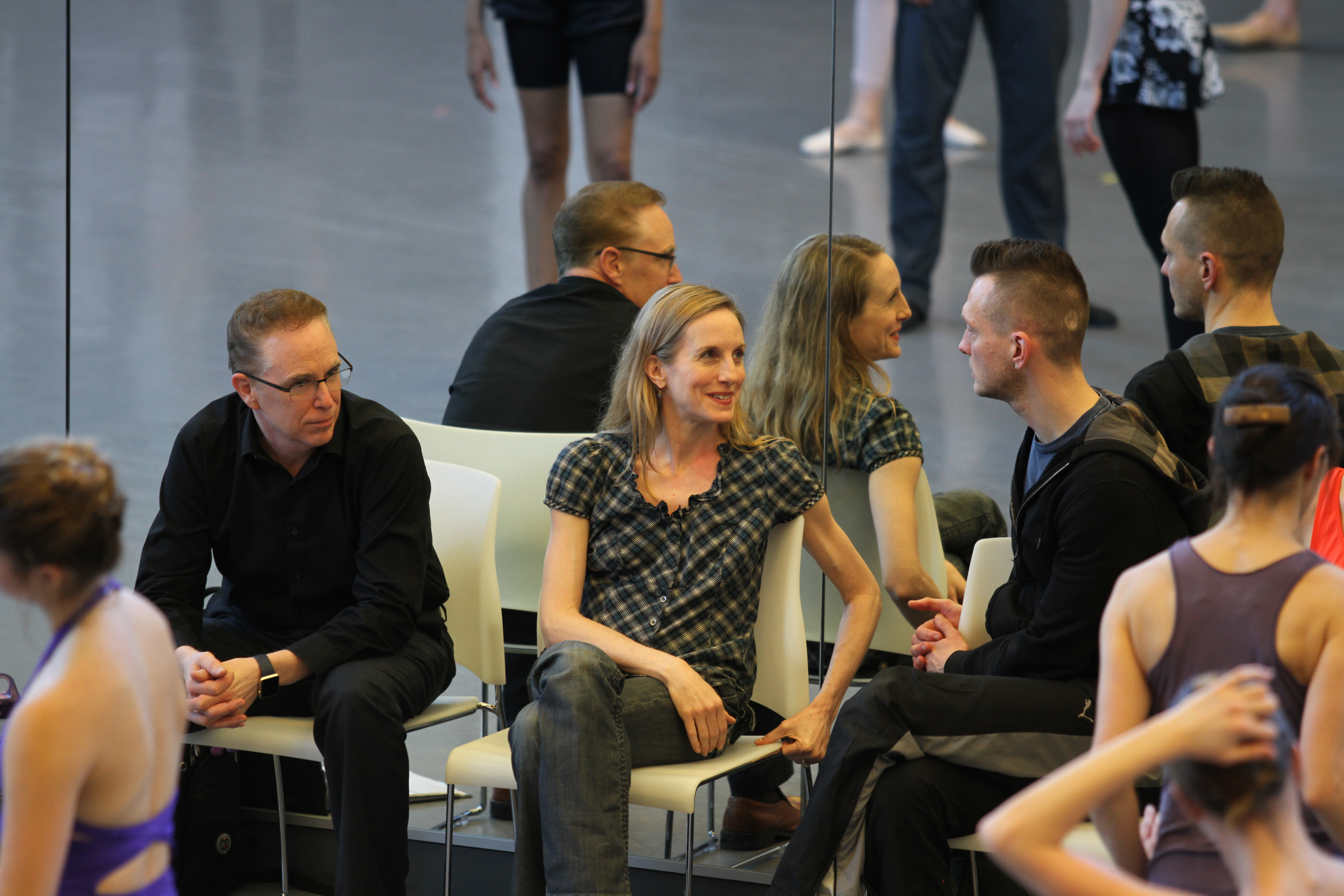
- Whelan (center) in 2016
- Born: May 7, 1967 (age 59); Louisville, Kentucky, U.S.
- Education: School of American Ballet
- Spouse: David Michalek (m. 2005)
- Career
- Current group: New York City Ballet

Wendy Whelan (/ˈhwiːlən/; born May 7, 1967) is an American ballet dancer. She was principal dancer with the New York City Ballet and performed with the company for 30 years, and toured in the U.S., Europe, and Asia. Whelan has also been an influential guest artist with Morphoses/The Wheeldon Company. In 2019, Whelan was named Associate Artistic Director of New York City Ballet.

== Early life ==
Whelan was born and raised in Louisville, Kentucky. She started ballet at age three. After performing as a mouse in The Nutcracker with the Louisville Ballet, she began formal training when she was eight at the Louisville Ballet Academy. At age 12, she was diagnosed with severe scoliosis, and had to wear a brace. In 1981, after auditioning before Suzanne Farrell, she received a scholarship to the summer intensive program at the School of American Ballet. She was asked to stay in New York and train, but chose to return to Kentucky and study at the J. Graham Brown School, a public high school, because she was only 14. The following year, she re-auditioned for SAB's summer course, this time before Karin von Aroldingen, was accepted again, and chose to remain in New York afterward. Whelan encountered George Balanchine only once. On the day she danced one of his works for the first time, as a corps member in Western Symphony at an SAB showcase, he died.

== Career ==
Whelan joined the NYCB in 1984 as an apprentice and entered the company's corps de ballet in January 1986. She was promoted to soloist in 1989, and to principal dancer in 1991. She had danced lead roles in George Balanchine's works, and worked with Jerome Robbins. In 2001, Whelan worked with Christopher Wheeldon in Polyphonia, which became Wheeldon's breakthrough ballet, and led to Whelan "beginning to find herself as a dancer." Whelan went on to originate in 12 more of Wheeldon's ballets, notably Liturgy and After the Rain. Whelan is also a frequent collaborator of Alexei Ratmansky, in works such as Russian Seasons and Concerto DSCH. Other choreographers she worked with include Twyla Tharp, Wayne McGregor and William Forsythe. She created roles in over 40 ballets, and is believed to have worked with more choreographers than any dancer in the company's history.

Outside of NYCB, she had guested with The Royal Ballet in London and the Mariinsky Ballet in St. Petersburg, and performed with Wheeldon's Morphoses/The Wheeldon Company. In 2012, she began a new collaborative project titled Restless Creature. She premiered this project at Jacob's Pillow in 2013. Whelan chose four choreographers—Kyle Abraham, Joshua Beamish, Brian Brooks, and Alejandro Cerrudo—to create dances for her. She has taken this production on national tour. It consists of four solos and duets, with Whelan dancing each duet with its choreographer.

Following an accident in 2012, Whelan began experiencing pains in her right hip. In 2013, she had a surgical reconstruction on her hip, followed by physical therapy. She eventually returned to the stage. A documentary film, titled Restless Creature: Wendy Whelan and released in 2017, followed Whelan through her hip surgery and recovery, the project's creation, and the last two years of her NYCB career.

In 2014, Whelan left NYCB after 30 years in the company. Her farewell performance was sold out within minutes. The performance included works by La sonnambula by Balanchine, pas de six from Dances at a Gathering by Robbins, Concerto DSCH, the After the Rain pas de deux, and a new work titled By 2 With & From by Wheeldon and Ratmansky.

After her departure from ballet, she shifted her focus to contemporary dance. In 2015, she appeared in a mixed bill titled Whelan/Watson: Other Stories, alongside Royal Ballet principal Edward Watson in Linbury Studio Theatre, London.

Whelan was appointed an Artistic Associate for developing new projects at New York City Center for a 2-year term from November 2014. Whelan was an artist-in-residence at Barnard College from November 2015 to May 2017. In 2017, she staged Ratmansky's Pictures at an Exhibition for the Pacific Northwest Ballet.

After Peter Martins' resignation in 2018 following allegations concerning emotional and physical abuse, Whelan was seen as a possible new director. A petition to hire her had over 15,000 signatures. In February 2019, Whelan was appointed as Associate Artistic Director of the NYCB. Jonathan Stafford, who had been acting as interim leader, was named Artistic Director. The two said they intended to work as partners, Stafford would be in charge of artistic operations while Whelan supervises programming. This is the first NYCB leadership that had never worked with Balanchine.

== Style ==
Whelan is known for her angular body and muscularity, particularly suited to the Balanchine style. She had been called America's greatest contemporary ballerina. Mikhail Baryshnikov commented she was "the best" and "there's a complexity, a sense of internal life, a woman on stage. You're always trying to decode this person when she moves."

== Originated roles ==
- Ulysses Dove: Red Angels
- Jorma Elo: Slice to Sharp
- Albert Evans: In a Landscape
- William Forsythe: Herman Schmerman
- Peter Martins: Ash, Jazz (Six Syncopated Movements), Les petits riens
- Wayne McGregor: Outlier
- Alexei Ratmansky: Concerto DSCH, Namouna, A Grand Divertissement, Pictures at an Exhibition, Russian Seasons
- Jerome Robbins: Brandenburg
- Lynne Taylor-Corbett: The Seven Deadly Sins
- Christopher Wheeldon: After the Rain, Les Carillons, Klavier, Liturgy, Morphoses, The Nightingale and the Rose, Polyphonia, Five Movements, Three Repeats

== Awards and honours ==
- 2007: Nominated for an Olivier Award and a Critics' Circle Award for her performances with the Morphoses/Wheeldon Company.
- 2007: Dance Magazine award
- 2009: Honorary Doctorate of Arts from Bellarmine University
- 2011: The Jerome Robbins Award
- 2011: Bessie Award for Sustained Achievement in Performance

== Personal life ==
Whelan married photographer David Michalek in September 2005. They reside in New York City.
