= Tyler Angle =

Canadian ice hockey player (born 2000)

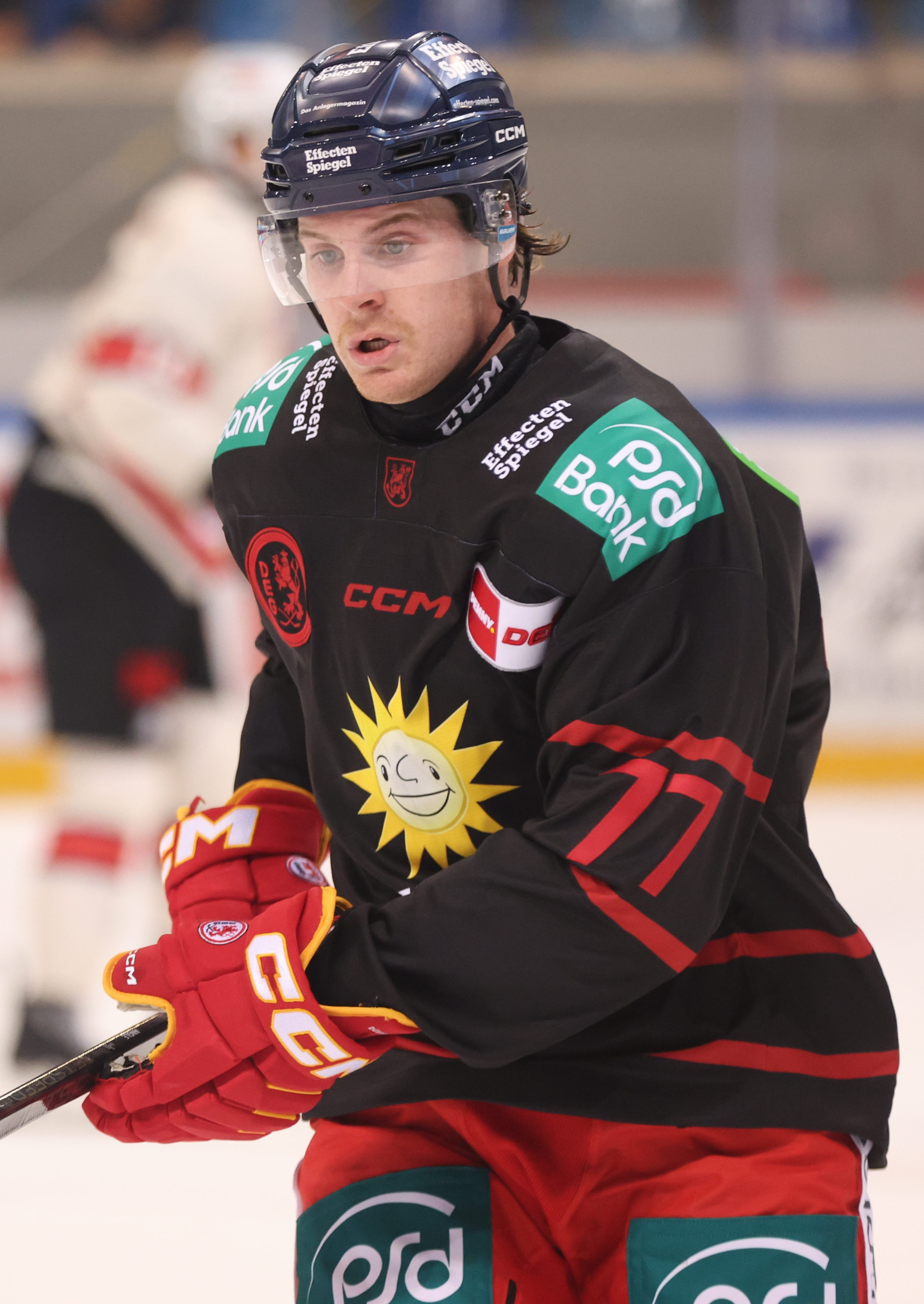
- Tyle Angle, 2024
- Born: September 30, 2000 (age 25) Niagara Falls, Ontario, Canada
- Height: 5 ft 10 in (178 cm)
- Weight: 172 lb (78 kg; 12 st 4 lb)
- Position: Center
- Shoots: Left
- Allsv team Former teams: Leksands IF; Columbus Blue Jackets; Düsseldorfer EG
- NHL draft: 212th overall, 2019; Columbus Blue Jackets
- Playing career: 2021–present

Tyler Angle (born September 30, 2000) is a Canadian professional ice hockey forward for Leksands IF of the HockeyAllsvenskan (Allsv). He has previously played for the Columbus Blue Jackets of the National Hockey League (NHL).

== Playing career ==
Angle played as a youth with St. Catharines Falcons in the Greater Ontario Junior Hockey League (GOJHL) before he was selected in the 2016 OHL Priority Draft, 114th overall by the Windsor Spitfires.

An undersized forward, following his third season of development with the Spitfires, Angle was drafted by the Columbus Blue Jackets in the seventh round, 212th overall, of the 2019 NHL entry draft. In his fourth season of major junior hockey in the OHL in 2019–20, Angle improved his offensive output to over a point-per-game, co-leading the team in registering 67 points through 62 regular season games before the remainder of the season was cancelled due to the COVID-19 pandemic.

With the 2020–21 season delayed due to the ongoing pandemic, and with junior hockey on hiatus for the season, Angle began his professional career by signing an amateur tryout contract with the Blue Jackets' AHL affiliate, the Cleveland Monsters, on January 21, 2021. Angle immediately produced offensively and showed versatility in the professional ranks, and after 6 games was signed to a three-year, entry-level contract with the Columbus Blue Jackets on March 30, 2021.

In his first full season in the AHL with the Monsters in 2021-22, Angle matched his goal output and notched career highs with 26 assists and 37 points through 71 regular season games.

Entering the second year of his contract with the Blue Jackets, Angle remained assigned to the Cleveland Monsters for the 2022–23 season. He matched his goal total for the third successive season, contributing with 11 goals and 23 points through 66 games. Nearing the completion of the season, with the Blue Jackets out of playoff contention, Angle received his first recall to the NHL and made his debut with the Blue Jackets on April 13, 2023, in a 3-2 victory over the Pittsburgh Penguins. In the final game of the regular season, Angle, in just his second career game, scored his first career NHL goal during a 5-2 defeat to the Buffalo Sabres on April 14, 2023.

A free agent from the Blue Jackets following his fourth season within the organization, Angle opted to pursue a European career and signed a one-year deal with German club Düsseldorfer EG of the Deutsche Eishockey Liga (DEL), on August 22, 2024.

After a lone season in Germany, Angle returned to North America for the 2025–26 season, signing a one-year AHL contract with the Grand Rapids Griffins, the primary affiliate of the Detroit Red Wings on October 8, 2025. Adding a veteran presence to the Griffins, Angle contributed with 6 goals and 26 points through 62 regular season appearances.

As a free agent at the conclusion of his contract with the Griffins, Angle returned to Europe in signing a one-year contract with Swedish second tier club, Leksands IF of the Allsvenskan, on July 10, 2026.

== Career statistics ==
			Regular season					Playoffs
Season	Team	League	GP	G	A	Pts	PIM	GP	G	A	Pts	PIM
2015–16	St. Catharines Falcons	GOJHL	1	0	0	0	0	—	—	—	—	—
2016–17	St. Catharines Falcons	GOJHL	11	5	3	8	26	—	—	—	—	—
2016–17	Windsor Spitfires	OHL	41	2	2	4	6	—	—	—	—	—
2017–18	Windsor Spitfires	OHL	67	10	7	17	42	6	1	0	1	9
2018–19	Windsor Spitfires	OHL	58	20	24	44	34	4	3	0	3	0
2019–20	Windsor Spitfires	OHL	62	29	38	67	38	—	—	—	—	—
2020–21	Cleveland Monsters	AHL	23	11	13	24	2	—	—	—	—	—
2021–22	Cleveland Monsters	AHL	71	11	26	37	32	—	—	—	—	—
2022–23	Cleveland Monsters	AHL	66	11	12	23	28	—	—	—	—	—
2022–23	Columbus Blue Jackets	NHL	2	1	0	1	0	—	—	—	—	—
2023–24	Cleveland Monsters	AHL	40	8	8	16	22	9	1	2	3	0
2023–24	Columbus Blue Jackets	NHL	2	0	0	0	0	—	—	—	—	—
2024–25	Düsseldorfer EG	DEL	47	7	20	27	14	—	—	—	—	—
2025–26	Grand Rapids Griffins	AHL	62	6	21	27	24	6	1	0	1	0
NHL totals			4	1	0	1	0	—	—	—	—	—
