= Christopher Wheeldon =

English ballet choreographer

Christopher Wheeldon OBE
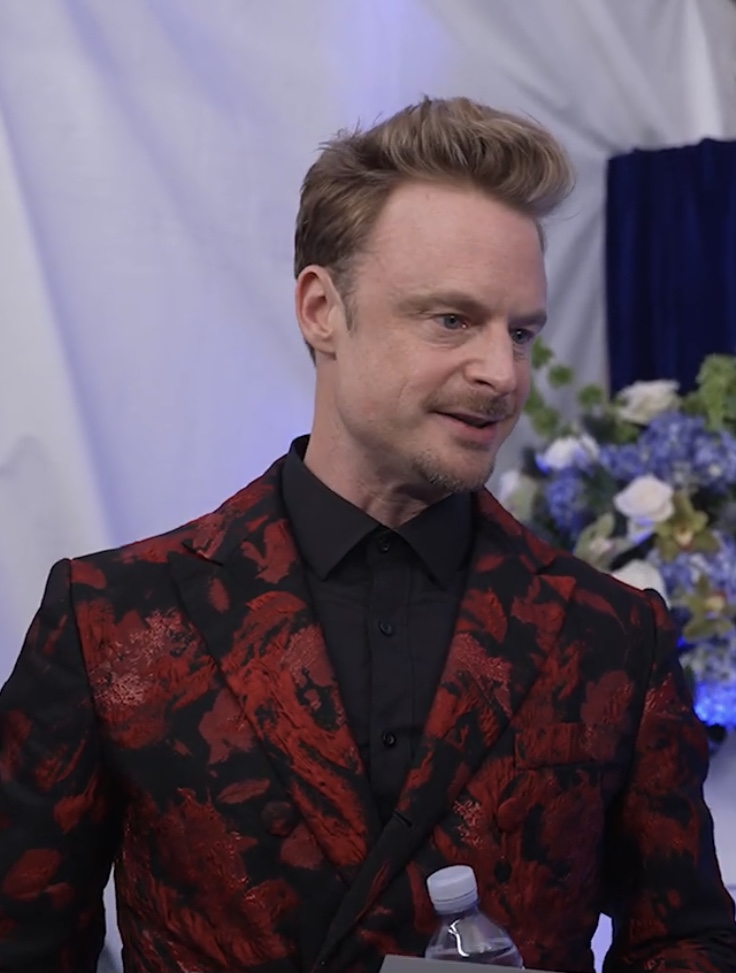
- Wheeldon at 75th Tony Awards 2022
- Born: 22 March 1973 (age 53); Yeovil, Somerset, England, U.K.
- Education: Royal Ballet School
- Occupations: ballet dancer, choreographer
- Known for: ballet
- Awards: Prix de Lausanne

Christopher Peter Wheeldon OBE (born 22 March 1973) is an English international choreographer of contemporary ballet.

== Early life ==
Born in Yeovil, Somerset, to an engineer and a physical therapist, Wheeldon began training to be a ballet dancer at the age of eight. He attended the Royal Ballet School between the ages of 11 and 18. In 1991, Wheeldon joined the Royal Ballet, London; and in that same year, he won the gold medal at the Prix de Lausanne competition.

In 1993, at the age of 19, Wheeldon moved to New York City to join the New York City Ballet. He was named Soloist in 1998.

Wheeldon began choreographing for the New York City Ballet in 1997, while continuing his career as a dancer. He retired as a dancer in 2000 in order to focus on his choreography.

== Career ==
=== 2000s ===
In 2001, Wheeldon became the New York City Ballet resident choreographer and first resident artist. He was productive in this position, choreographing a number of much lauded works for the troupe, Polyphonia being the first. He quickly developed a reputation as a talented choreographer, and several other eminent ballet companies, such as the San Francisco Ballet, the Bolshoi Ballet, and The Royal Ballet, London, have commissioned dances from him. As of May 2003, Wheeldon had composed at least 23 works.

In November 2006, Wheeldon announced the formation of Morphoses/The Wheeldon Company, a transatlantic company with a US base at New York City Center and in the UK at Sadler's Wells Theatre, London. In its first season, the company performed in Vail, London and New York. Wheeldon completed his tenure as Resident Choreographer of New York City Ballet in February 2008. In 2009, the City Parks Foundation commissioned Wheeldon and contemporary singer-songwriter Martha Wainwright to create a new work. The piece, entitled "Tears of St. Lawrence", premiered at Central Park SummerStage on 14 and 15 August. The fifteen-minute ballet, choreographed by Wheeldon and Edwaard Liang, featured twelve dancers accompanied by live music and song by Wainwright, who sang while intermingling with the dancers. In February 2010, Wheeldon resigned from Morphoses, which continued to produce ballets without his name.

An Emmy award-winning fly-on-the-wall television documentary Strictly Bolshoi followed Wheeldon as he became the first Englishman to be invited to create a new work for the Bolshoi Ballet.

In the June/July 2009 issue of The Advocate, Wheeldon was featured on a list of artists who made the "Forty Under 40" list.

=== 2010s ===
Wheeldon was appointed Artistic Associate of The Royal Ballet in 2012.

In 2011, Wheeldon premiered a full-length ballet Alice's Adventures in Wonderland at the Royal Ballet, Covent Garden. This was the first full-length ballet created at the Royal Ballet for over 20 years, and was jointly commissioned with the National Ballet of Canada. The ballet had its world premiere on 28 February 2011 (with Royal Ballet principal Lauren Cuthbertson in the lead role) and featured a brand new score by Joby Talbot.

In 2014, Wheeldon premiered another full-length ballet, The Winter's Tale for the Royal Ballet, Covent Garden, again a co-commission with the National Ballet of Canada, based on the Shakespeare play of the same name. It, too, featured a score by Joby Talbot and has been given generally good reviews – "a ballet to keep" said The Daily Telegraph, and "a spectacular full-length narrative work that will stand the test of time" said the Toronto Star.

Wheeldon was appointed an Officer of the Order of the British Empire (OBE) in the 2016 New Year Honours for "services to promoting the interests and reputation of British classical and theatrical dance worldwide".

In December 2016, Wheeldon's Nutcracker was premiered by the Joffrey Ballet in Chicago. Instead of the traditional upper-class party scene, Wheeldon opted for a "shack scene" which takes place in Chicago's south side. Marie is then introduced to the enchanted world of sweets and foreign places.

On 6 June 2019, Wheeldon's Cinderella in-the-round with English National Ballet was premiered at the Royal Albert Hall with over 90 dancers, and projections which created the fairytale setting.

=== 2020s ===
On February 1, 2022, MJ the Musical opened on Broadway. Wheeldon was nominated for Best Direction of a Musical and Best Choreography at the Tony Awards, winning the latter.

In 2023, he was a jury member at Prix de Lausanne ballet competitions.

In 2024 Wheeldon created a new full-length ballet on commission for The Australian Ballet, Oscar, based on the life of Oscar Wilde.

in 2025, Wheeldon created the finale solo performance of Étoile Season 1, and appeared in episodes 7 and 8 as himself.

On January 21, 2027, his new work A Breath Away From Where You Are will be performed for vilderwerk, a nonprofit organization inspiring conservation awareness through dance, at the New York City Center. Wheeldon has been a founding board member of vildwerk. since 2022,

== Personal life ==
Wheeldon married yoga instructor Ross Rayburn in 2013. The ceremony took place on Fire Island, NY and was captured in a Vimeo video by Daniel Robinson.

== Honors ==
- Prix de Lausanne, Gold Medal (1991)
- Mae L. Wien Award, School of American Ballet
- Martin E. Segal Award, Lincoln Center, New York City
- London Critics' Circle Award
- American Choreography Award
- Olivier Award : Best theatre choreographer 2025
- Dance Magazine Award
- Prix Benois de la Danse – 2013, best choreography (Cinderella, co-production by Dutch National Ballet and San Francisco Ballet)
- Prix Benois de la Danse–2015, best choreography (The Winter's Tale by Joby Talbot, The Royal Ballet)
- 2015 Tony Award for best choreography 'An American in Paris'
- Times Arts Award for Best Director of A Musical 'An American in Paris"
- Outer Critics Circle Award Best Director of a musical 'An American in Paris' and choreography 'An American in Paris'
- Broadwayworld.co.uk award for Best Director of a Musical for An American in Paris.
- 2022 Tony Award & 2025 Olivier Award for Best Choreography for 'MJ the Musical'

== See also ==
- Morphoses productions

== Footnotes ==
New York City Ballet
Preceded by Inaugural holder	Resident Choreographer; 2001–2008	Succeeded by Justin Peck
