= David H. Koch Theater =

Venue at New York City's Lincoln Center

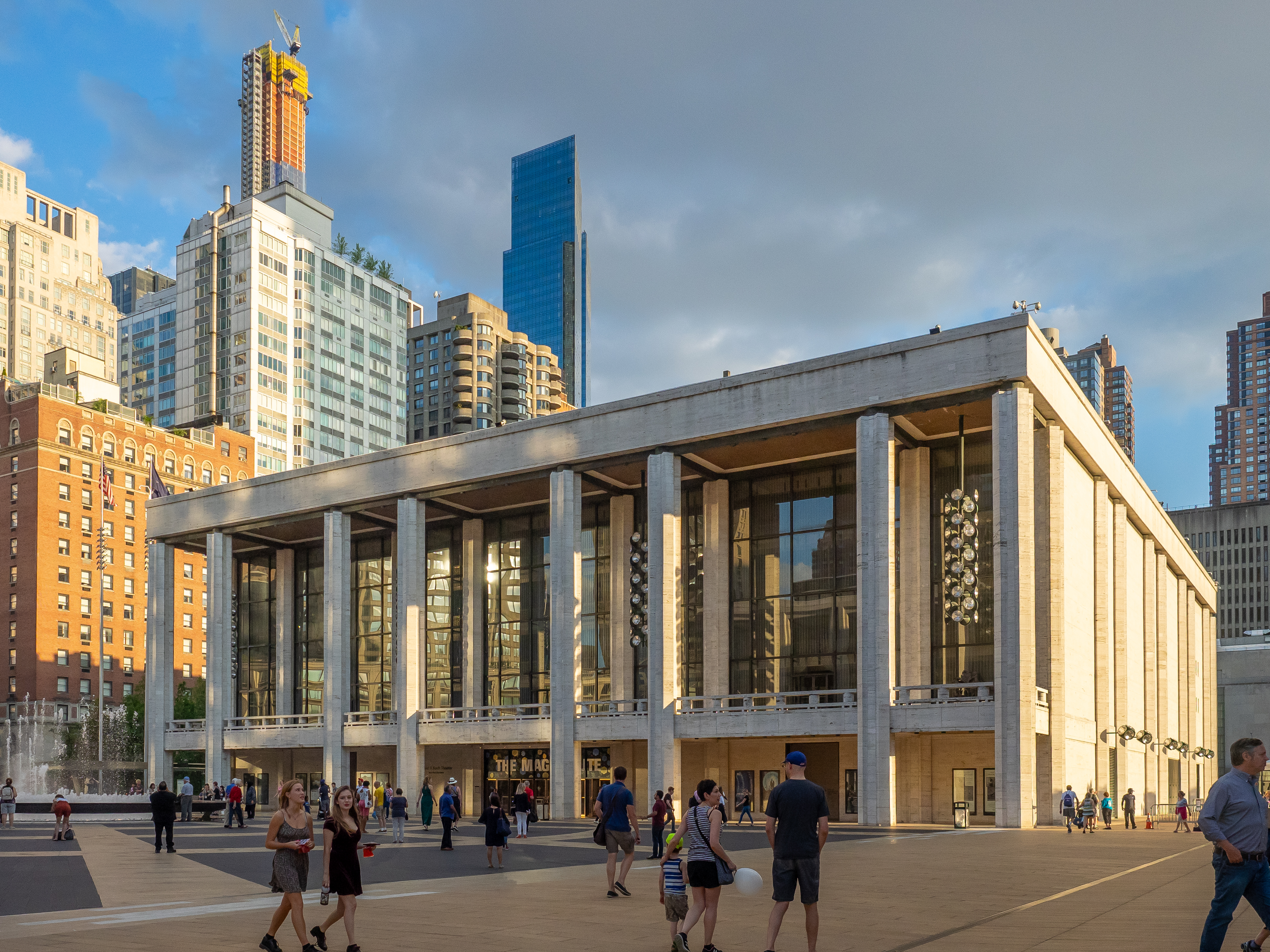
- The David H. Koch Theater at Lincoln Center, seen from the Lincoln Center Plaza.
- Interactive map of David H. Koch Theater
- Former names: New York State Theater
- Address: 20 Lincoln Center Plaza
- Location: New York City
- Coordinates: 40°46′19″N 73°59′1″W
- Owner: City of New York
- Operator: New York City Ballet (City Center of Music and Drama, Inc.)
- Capacity: 2,586
- Type: Theatre
- Public transit: Subway: (all times) (late nights) at 66th Street–Lincoln Center; NYC Bus: M5, M7, M11, M20, M66, M104

Construction
- Opened: April 23, 1964

Tenant
- New York City Ballet

The David H. Koch Theater is a theater for ballet and dance at Lincoln Center in the Lincoln Square neighborhood of Manhattan in New York City. Originally named the New York State Theater, the venue has been home to the New York City Ballet since its opening in 1964, and served as home to the New York City Opera from 1964 to 2011. Renamed to honor philanthropist David Koch, the theater occupies the south side of the main plaza of Lincoln Center, opposite David Geffen Hall near 63rd Street and Columbus Avenue.

== History ==
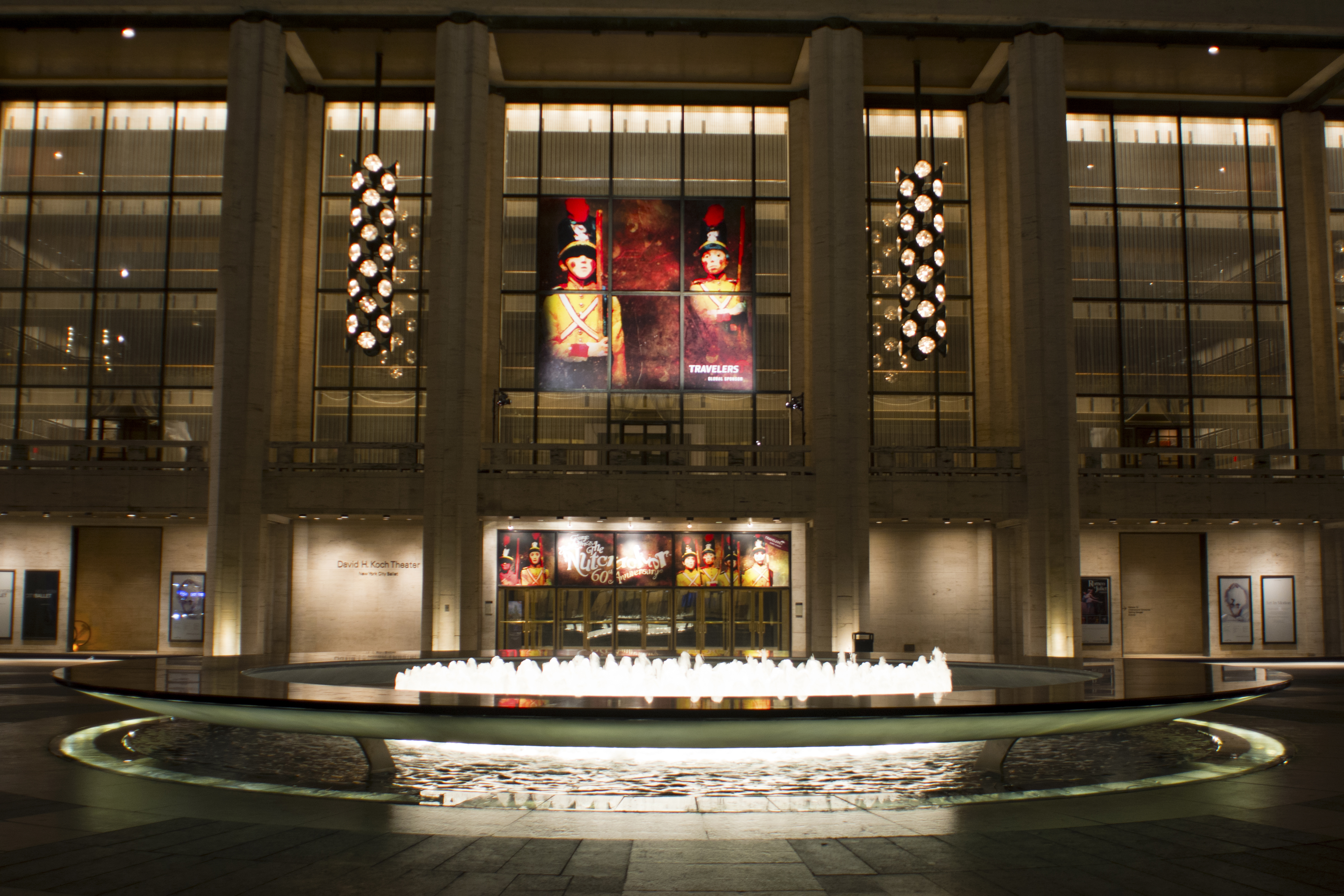
The David H. Koch Theater

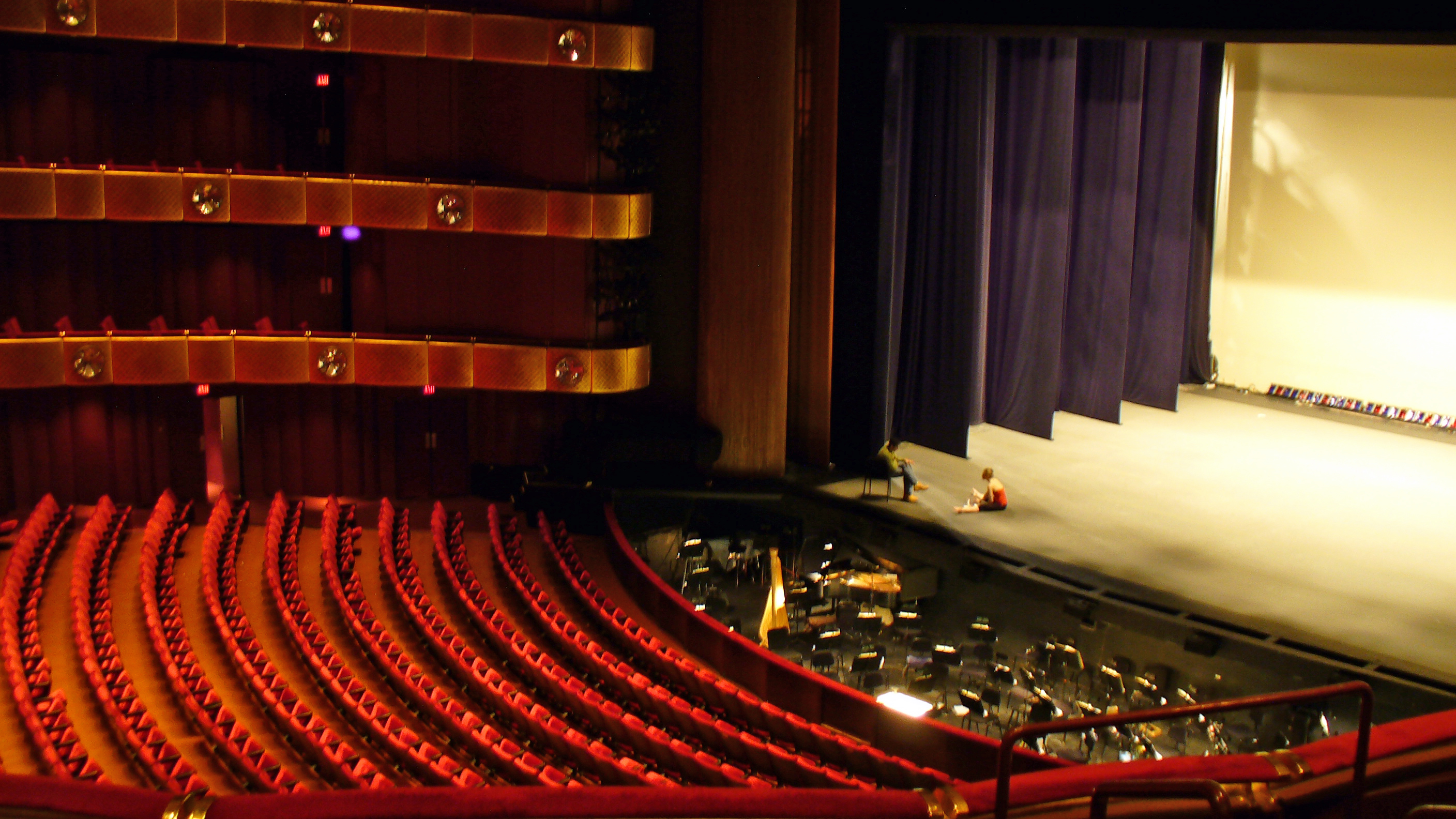
Interior of the theater, prior to 2008 renovations

Buildings of Lincoln Center
Buildings and structures in Lincoln Center:
1 Samuel B. and David Rose Building (includes Walter Reade Theater)
2 Juilliard School
3 Alice Tully Hall
4 Vivian Beaumont Theater (includes Mitzi E. Newhouse Theater and Claire Tow Theater)
5 Elinor Bunin Monroe Film Center
6 David Geffen Hall
7 New York Public Library for the Performing Arts (includes Bruno Walter Auditorium)
8 Metropolitan Opera House
9 Josie Robertson Plaza with Revson Fountain
10 Damrosch Park
11 David H. Koch Theater
12 David Rubenstein Atrium
13 Jazz at Lincoln Center

The New York State Theater was built with funds from the State of New York as part of New York State's cultural participation in the 1964–1965 World's Fair. The theater was designed by architects Philip Johnson and John Burgee, opened on April 23, 1964. After the Fair, the State transferred ownership of the theater to the City of New York.

The City leases the theater to Lincoln Center for the Performing Arts, Inc. The corporation originally sublet it to City Center of Music and Drama, Inc. (CCMD), originally affiliated with New York City Center on 55th Street. Not long after New York City Opera vacated the building, the venue became directly managed by New York City Ballet.

Along with the opera and ballet companies, another early tenant of the theater was the now defunct Music Theater of Lincoln Center whose president was composer Richard Rodgers. In the mid 1960s, the company produced fully staged revivals of classic Broadway musicals. These included The King and I; Carousel (with original star, John Raitt); Annie Get Your Gun (revised in 1966 by Irving Berlin for its original star, Ethel Merman); Show Boat; and South Pacific.

In July 2008, oil-and-gas billionaire David H. Koch pledged to provide $100 million over the next ten years to renovate the theater and provide an operating and maintenance endowment. The facility became the David H. Koch Theater at the New York City Ballet Winter gala, November 25 of that year. The theater is to bear his name for at least fifty years, after which it may be renamed; the Koch family retains the right of first refusal for any renaming. Some people continue to refer to the theater by its original name because of the controversial political influencing of David and Charles Koch.

== Building features and renovation ==
The theater seats 2,586 and features broad seating on the orchestra level, four main "Rings" (balconies) and a small Fifth Ring, faced with jewel-like lights and a large spherical chandelier in the center of the gold latticed ceiling.

JCJ Architecture of New York City designed renovations with Schuler Shook as theater consultants. In patron areas, the plan replaced and reconfigured all seats and carpeting. The reconfiguration created two aisles in the orchestra level, which previously featured continental-style seating, with no center aisles. It also upgraded restrooms to make them ADA compliant. Work backstage included a new stage lighting system, expansion of the orchestra pit, and a mechanical lift in the pit floor allowing it to be raised to stage level when needed.

The lobby areas of the theater feature many works of modern art, including pieces by Jasper Johns, Lee Bontecou and Reuben Nakian.

== Gallery ==
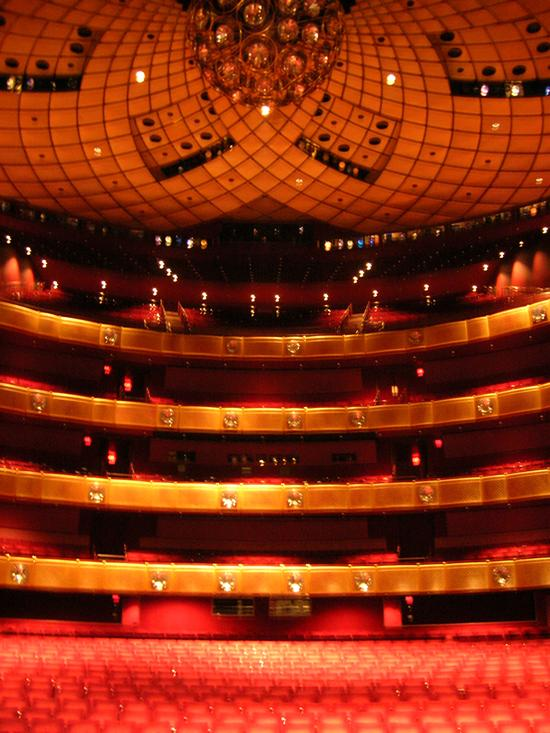
The auditorium, as seen from the stage in 2006

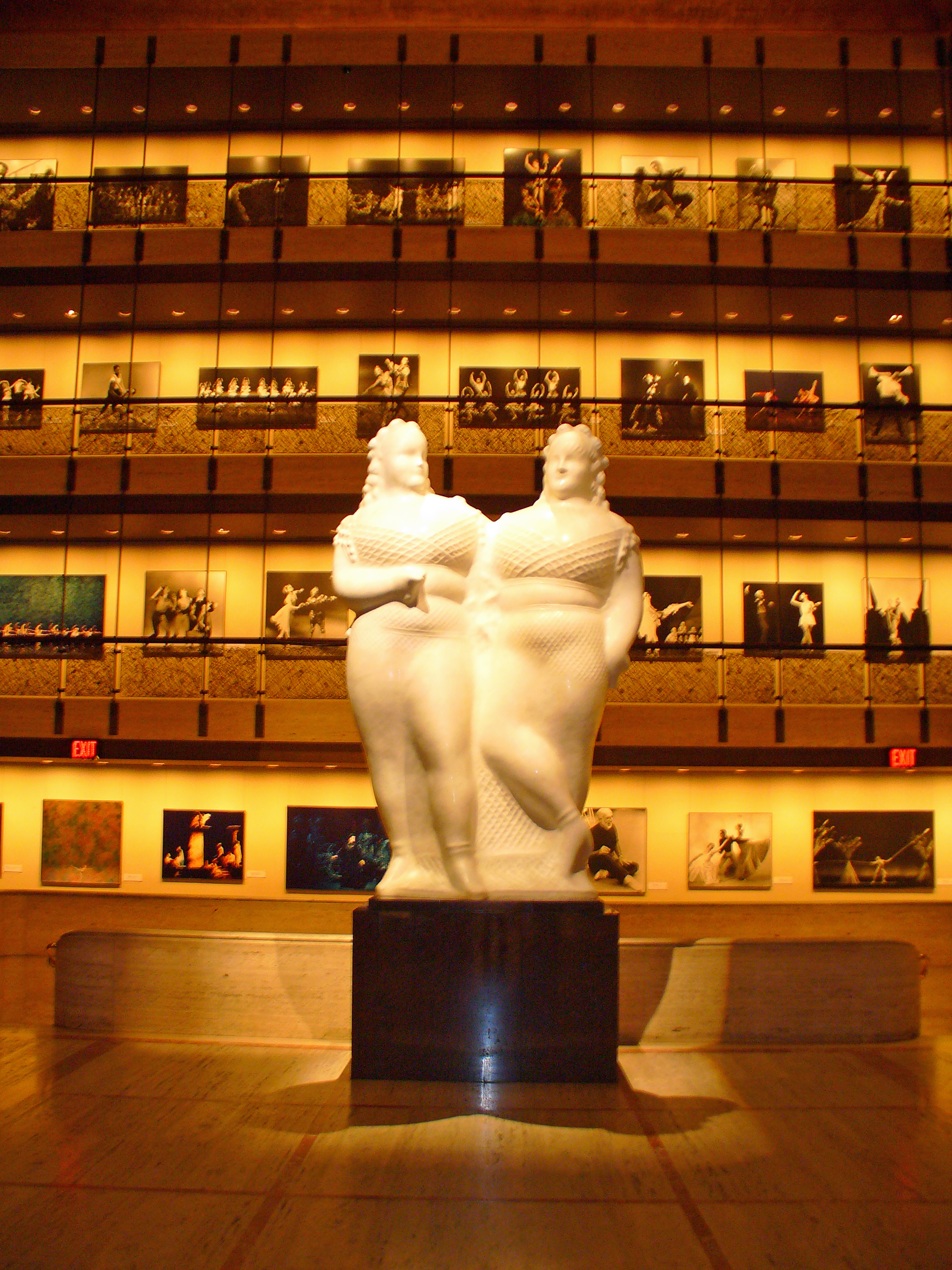
The Promenade with Elie Nadelman sculpture

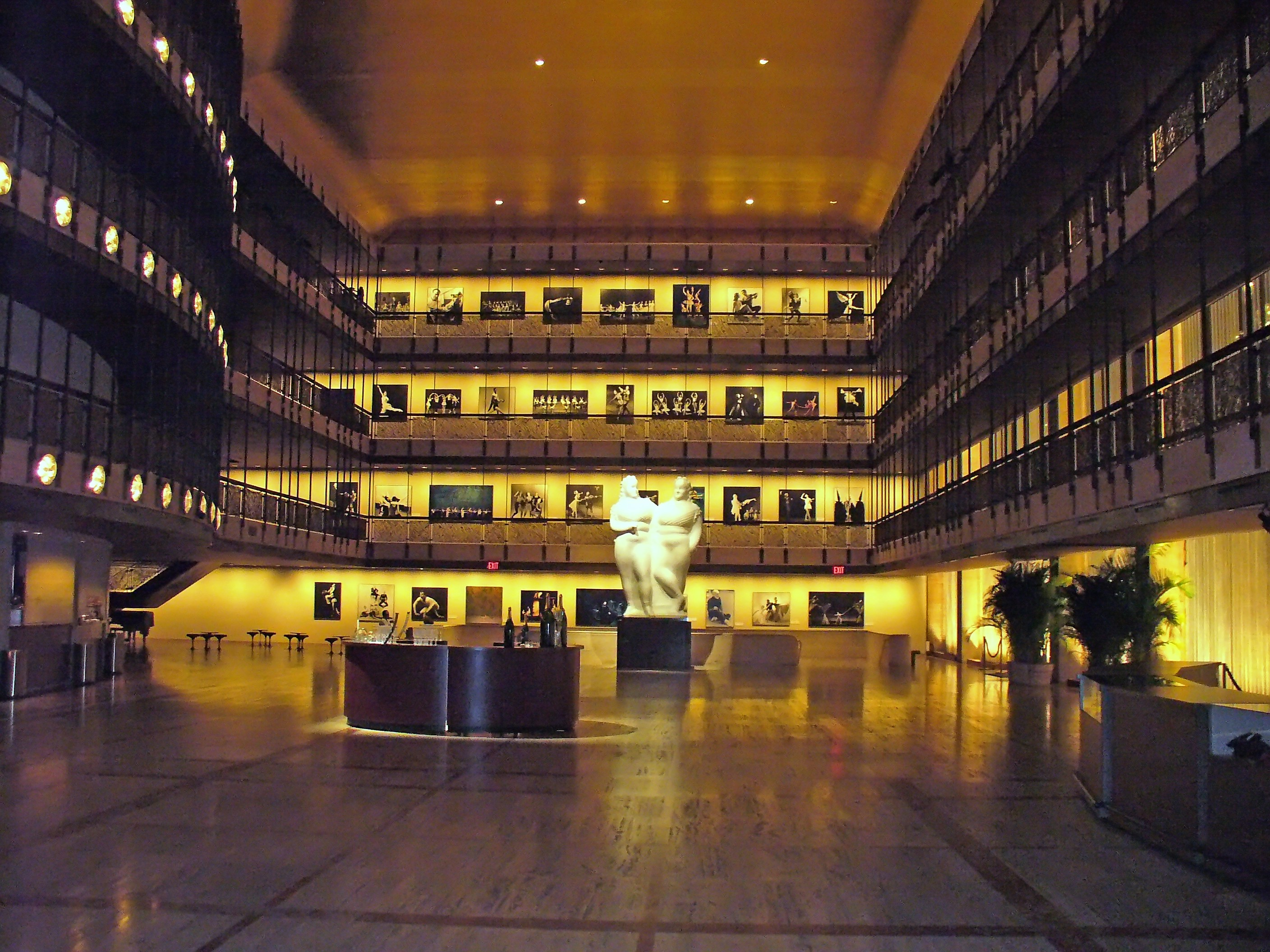
The Promenade

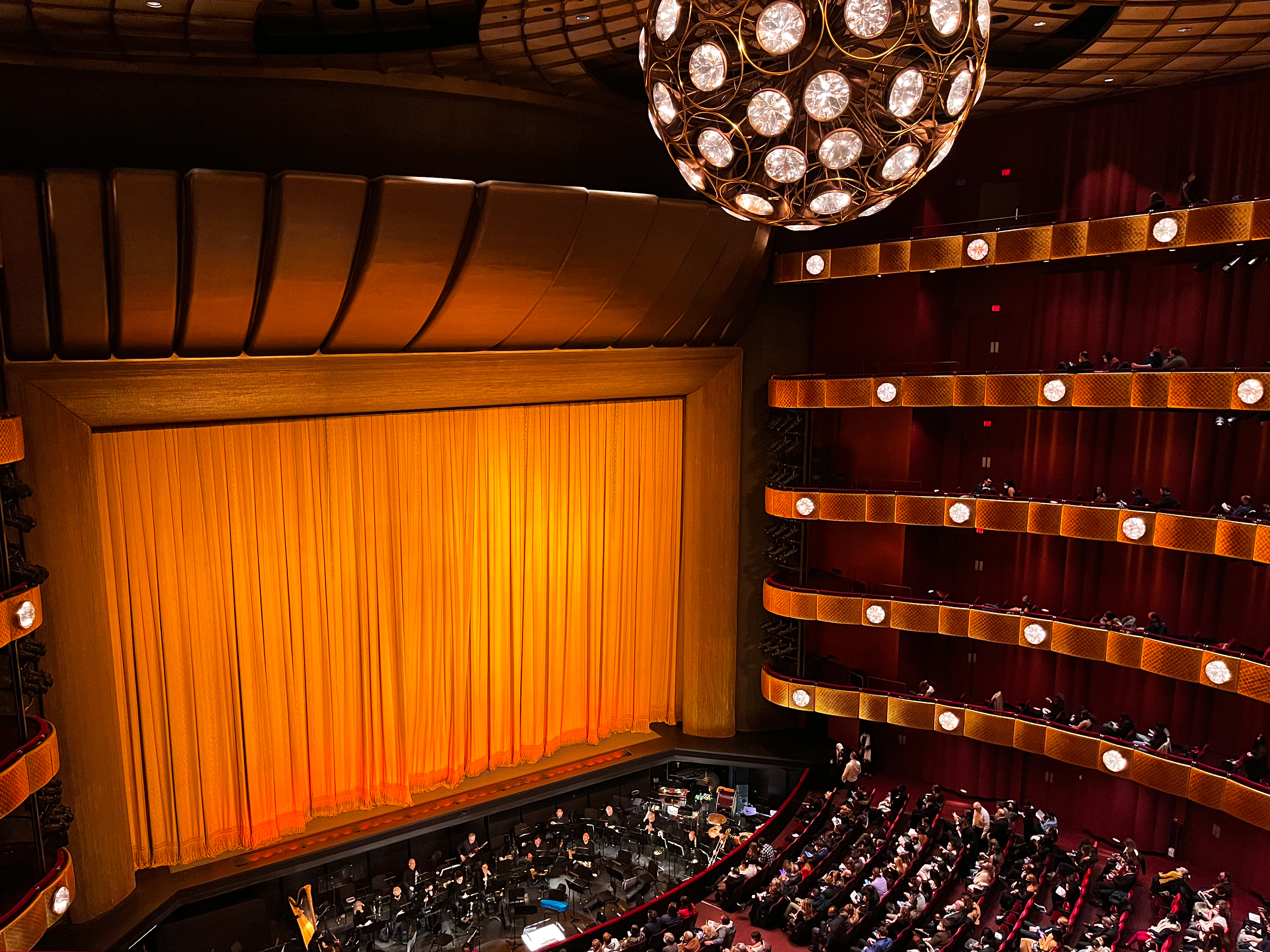
Interior view of the David H. Koch Theater in 2022
