= List of ballets by George Balanchine =

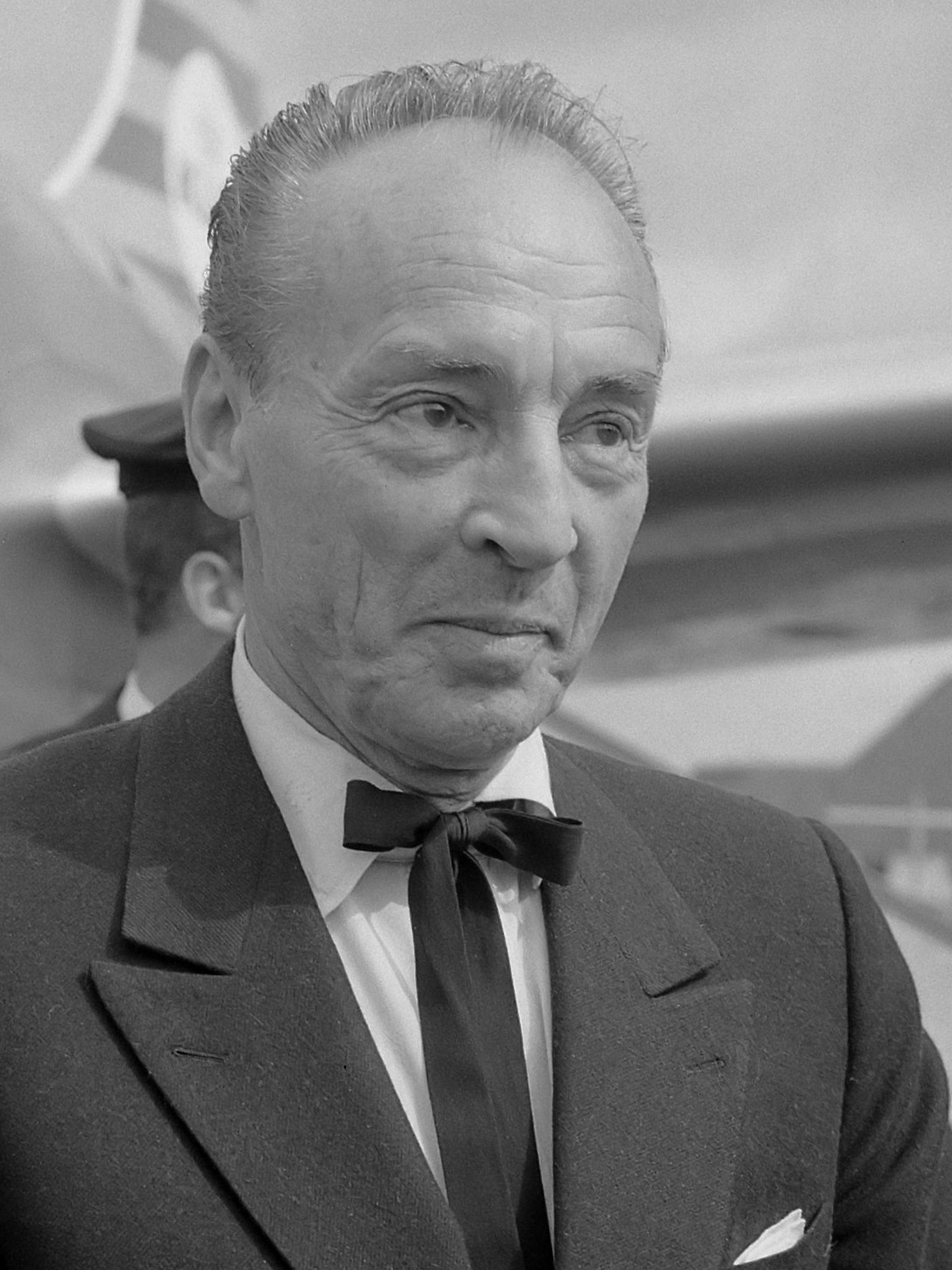
George Balanchine in 1965

This is a list of ballets by George Balanchine (1904–1983), New York City Ballet co-founder and ballet master.

== Chronological ==
- 1928 Apollo
- 1929 Le Bal
- 1929 The Prodigal Son
- 1934 Serenade
- 1936 Slaughter on Tenth Avenue
- 1936 Zenobia
- 1937 Jeu de cartes
- 1941 Concerto Barocco
- 1941 Tschaikovsky Piano Concerto No. 2
- 1942 Circus Polka
- 1946 La Sonnambula
- 1946 The Four Temperaments
- 1947 Haieff Divertimento
- 1947 Symphonie Concertante
- 1947 Symphony in C
- 1947 Theme and Variations
- 1948 Orpheus
- 1948 Pas de Trois (Minkus)
- 1949 Bourrée fantasque
- 1949 The Firebird
- 1950 Sylvia Pas de Deux
- 1951 À la Françaix
- 1951 La Valse
- 1951 Swan Lake (Act 2)
- 1952 Bayou
- 1952 Concertino
- 1952 Caracole
- 1952 Harlequinade Pas de Deux
- 1952 Metamorphoses
- 1952 Scotch Symphony
- 1954 Ivesiana
- 1954 The Nutcracker
- 1954 Western Symphony
- 1955 Pas de Dix
- 1955 Pas de Trois
- 1956 Allegro Brillante
- 1956 Divertimento No. 15
- 1957 Agon
- 1957 Square Dance
- 1958 Gounod Symphony
- 1958 Stars and Stripes
- 1959 Episodes
- 1960 Donizetti Variations
- 1960 Liebeslieder Walzer
- 1960 Monumentum pro Gesualdo
- 1960 Ragtime (I)
- 1960 Tschaikovsky Pas de Deux
- 1961 Electronics
- 1961 Raymonda Variations
- 1962 A Midsummer Night's Dream
- 1963 Bugaku
- 1963 Meditation
- 1963 Movements for Piano and Orchestra
- 1964 Clarinade
- 1964 Tarantella
- 1965 Don Quixote
- 1965 Harlequinade
- 1966 Brahms–Schoenberg Quartet
- 1966 Variations
- 1967 Divertimento Brillante
- 1967 Jewels
  - Emeralds
  - Rubies
  - Diamonds
- 1967 Ragtime (II)
- 1967 Valse-Fantaisie
- 1968 Metastaseis and Pithoprakta
- 1968 Requiem Canticles
- 1968 La Source
- 1968 Slaughter on Tenth Avenue
- 1970 Tschaikovsky Suite No. 3
- 1970 Who Cares?
- 1972 Divertimento from Le baiser de la fée
- 1972 Duo Concertant
- 1972 Pulcinella
- 1972 Scherzo à la Russe
- 1972 Stravinsky Violin Concerto
- 1972 Symphony in Three Movements
- 1973 Cortège Hongrois
- 1974 Coppélia
- 1974 Variations pour une porte et un soupir
- 1975 Le tombeau de Couperin
- 1975 Pavane
- 1975 Sonatine
- 1975 The Steadfast Tin Soldier
- 1975 Tzigane
- 1976 Chaconne
- 1976 Union Jack
- 1977 Etude for Piano
- 1977 Vienna Waltzes
- 1978 Ballo della Regina
- 1978 Kammermusik No. 2
- 1979 Le Bourgeois Gentilhomme
- 1980 Ballade
- 1980 Robert Schumann’s Davidsbündlertänze
- 1980 Walpurgisnacht Ballet
- 1981 Garland Dance
- 1981 Hungarian Gypsy Airs
- 1981 Mozartiana
- 1982 Élégie
- 1982 Noah and the Flood
- 1982 Tango
- 1982 Variations for Orchestra

== Alphabetical ==
- 1951 À la Françaix
- 1962 A Midsummer Night's Dream
- 1957 Agon
- 1956 Allegro Brillante
- 1928 Apollo
- 1929 Le Bal
- 1980 Ballade
- 1978 Ballo della Regina
- 1952 Bayou
- 1979 Le Bourgeois Gentilhomme
- 1949 Bourrée fantasque
- 1966 Brahms–Schoenberg Quartet
- 1963 Bugaku
- 1952 Caracole
- 1976 Chaconne
- 1942 Circus Polka
- 1964 Clarinade
- 1952 Concertino
- 1941 Concerto Barocco
- 1974 Coppélia
- 1973 Cortège Hongrois
- 1967 Diamonds
- 1967 Divertimento Brillante
- 1972 Divertimento from Le baiser de la fée
- 1956 Divertimento No. 15
- 1965 Don Quixote
- 1960 Donizetti Variations
- 1972 Duo Concertant
- 1961 Electronics
- 1982 Élégie
- 1967 Emeralds
- 1959 Episodes
- 1977 Etude for Piano
- 1949 The Firebird
- 1946 The Four Temperaments
- 1981 Garland Dance
- 1958 Gounod Symphony
- 1947 Haieff Divertimento
- 1965 Harlequinade
- 1952 Harlequinade Pas de Deux
- 1981 Hungarian Gypsy Airs
- 1954 Ivesiana
- 1937 Jeu de cartes
- 1967 Jewels
- 1978 Kammermusik No. 2
- 1946 La Sonnambula
- 1968 La Source
- 1951 La Valse
- 1929 Le Bal
- 1960 Liebeslieder Walzer
- 1963 Meditation
- 1952 Metamorphoses
- 1968 Metastaseis and Pithoprakta
- 1960 Monumentum pro Gesualdo
- 1963 Movements for Piano and Orchestra
- 1981 Mozartiana
- 1982 Noah and the Flood
- 1948 Orpheus
- 1955 Pas de Dix
- 1955 Pas de Trois (Glinka)
- 1948 Pas de Trois (Minkus]
- 1975 Pavane
- 1929 The Prodigal Son
- 1972 Pulcinella
- 1960 Ragtime (I)
- 1967 Ragtime (II)
- 1961 Raymonda Variations
- 1968 Requiem Canticles
- 1980 Robert Schumann’s Davidsbündlertänze
- 1967 Rubies
- 1972 Scherzo à la russe
- 1952 Scotch Symphony
- 1935 Serenade
- 1936 Slaughter on Tenth Avenue
- 1975 Sonatine
- 1968 La source
- 1957 Square Dance
- 1958 Stars and Stripes
- 1975 The Steadfast Tin Soldier
- 1972 Stravinsky Violin Concerto
- 1951 Swan Lake (Act 2)
- 1950 Sylvia Pas de Deux
- 1947 Symphonie Concertante
- 1947 Symphony in C
- 1972 Symphony in Three Movements
- 1982 Tango
- 1964 Tarantella
- 1947 Theme and Variations
- 1975 Le tombeau de Couperin
- 1960 Tschaikovsky Pas de Deux
- 1941 Tschaikovsky Piano Concerto No. 2
- 1970 Tschaikovsky Suite No. 3
- 1975 Tzigane
- 1976 Union Jack
- 1967 Valse-Fantaisie
- 1966 Variations
- 1982 Variations for Orchestra
- 1974 Variations pour une porte et un soupir
- 1977 Vienna Waltzes
- 1980 Walpurgisnacht Ballet
- 1954 Western Symphony
- 1970 Who Cares?
- 1936 Zenobia

== By company ==
=== For Ballets Russes ===
- Le Chant du rossignol (The Song of the Nightingale) (1925)
- Jack in the Box (1926)
- Pastorale (1926)
- Barabau (1926)
- La Chatte (1927)
- Le Triomphe de Neptune (1927)
- Apollo (1928)
- The Prodigal Son (1929)
- Le Bal (1929)

=== For Ballet Russe de Monte-Carlo ===
- Cotillon (1932)
- Concurrence (1932)
- Le Bourgeois Gentilhomme (1932 and 1944)
- Balustrade (1941)
- Danses concertantes (1944 and 1972)
- Song of Norway (1944)
- Pas de Deux (Grand adagio) (1945)
- La Sonnambula (1946)
- The Night Shadow (1946)
- Raymonda (1946)

=== For Les Ballets 1933 ===
- The Seven Deadly Sins (1933)
- Errante (1933)
- Les Songes (1933)
- Fastes (1933)

=== For the American Ballet ===
- Alma Mater (1934)
- Les Songes (Dreams) (1934)
- Mozartiana (1934)
- Serenade (1935)
- Errante (1935)
- Reminiscence (1935)
- Jeu de cartes (variously, Card Game or The Card Party) (1937)
- Le Baiser de la Fée (originally titled The Fairy's Kiss) (1937)

=== For Broadway ===
- Ziegfeld Follies of 1936
  - Words without Music: A Surrealist Ballet, a production number for the singing and dancing ensemble
  - Night Flight, a solo for Harriet Hoctor
  - 5 A.M., a number for Josephine Baker and male dancers
- On Your Toes (1936), music by Richard Rodgers, lyrics by Lorenz Hart; starring Tamara Geva and Ray Bolger. This dramatic ballet served as the climax of this musical production and has subsequently been presented as a stand-alone piece; however, several of the sung numbers in the show featured dance routines as well, notably the title number.
  - Princess Zenobia Ballet (1936)
  - Slaughter on Tenth Avenue (1936).
- Babes in Arms (1937), by Rodgers and Hart
- I Married an Angel (1938), by Rodgers and Hart; starring Vera Zorina
- The Boys from Syracuse (1938), by Rodgers and Hart
- Great Lady (1938), music by Frederick Loewe
- Keep Off the Grass (1940), a musical revue
- Louisiana Purchase (1940), music and lyrics by Irving Berlin; with William Gaxton and Vera Zorina
- Cabin in the Sky (1940), music by Vernon Duke, lyrics by John Latouche; starring Ethel Waters and Katherine Dunham, who collaborated with Balanchine on the choreography
- The Lady Comes Across (1942), by Duke and Latouche; a notable flop
- Rosalinda (1942), an operetta with music by Johann Strauss
- The Merry Widow (1943), an operetta with music by Franz Lehár
- What's Up? (1943), lyrics by Alan Jay Lerner, music by Frederick Loewe
- Dream with Music (1944), a musical fantasy starring Vera Zorina
- Song of Norway (1944), an operetta based on the life and music of Edvard Grieg; Balanchine's most successful Broadway show
- Mr. Strauss Goes to Boston (1945), another flop
- The Chocolate Soldier (1947), an operetta with music by Oscar Straus
- Where's Charley? lyrics and music by Frank Loesser, a long-running show starring Ray Bolger
- Courtin' Time (1951), music and lyrics by Don Walker and Jack Lawrence
- House of Flowers (1954), music by Harold Arlen, lyrics by Truman Capote and Harold Arlen; starring Pearl Bailey, Diahann Carroll, and Juanita Hall; Balanchine's choreography was rearranged by Herbert Ross before the Broadway opening

=== For Hollywood ===
- The Goldwyn Follies (1938), with Vera Zorina and William Dollar as principal dancers
  - "Romeo and Juliet," with ballet dancers as the Capulets and tap dancers as the Montagues
  - "Water Nymph Ballet," in which Zorina rose from the depths of a pool
- On Your Toes (1939), the film version of the Broadway show, starring Vera Zorina and Eddie Albert
- I Was an Adventuress (1940), starring Vera Zorina
- Star Spangled Rhythm (1942), a wartime morale booster for military troops
  - "That Old Black Magic," sung by Johnny Johnston, danced by Vera Zorina
- Follow the Boys (1944), with Vera Zorina and George Raft

=== For American Ballet Caravan ===
- Ballet Imperial (1941; renamed Tschaikovsky Piano Concerto No. 2 in 1973)
- Concerto Barocco (1941)

=== For the Ballet del Teatro de Colón ===
- Mozart Violin Concerto (1942)

=== For Ballet Theatre ===
- Waltz Academy (1944)
- Theme and Variations (1947)

=== For Ballet Society ===
- The Four Temperaments (1946)
- L'enfant et Les Sortilèges (The Spellbound Child) (1946)
- Haieff Divertimento (1947)
- Symphonie Concertante (1947)
- Orpheus (1948)

=== For the Paris Opera Ballet ===
- Palais de Cristal (1947, in 1948 restaged in Symphony in C)

=== For Le Grand Ballet du Marquis de Cuevas ===
- Pas de Trois Classique (also known as Minkus Pas de Trois) (1948)

=== For New York City Ballet ===
- La Sonnambula (1946)
- Bourrée Fantasque (1949)
- The Firebird (1959; later revised with Jerome Robbins)
- Sylvia Pas de Deux (1950)
- Swan Lake (after Lev Ivanov) (1951)
- La Valse (1951)
- Harlequinade Pas De Deux (1952)
- Metamorphoses (1952)
- Caracole (1952)
- Scotch Symphony (1952)
- Valse Fantaisie (1953/1967)
- The Nutcracker (1954)
- Ivesiana (1954)
- Western Symphony (1954)
- Glinka Pas De Trois (1955)
- Pas De Dix (1955)
- Divertimento No. 15 (1956)
- Allegro Brillante (1956)
- Agon (1957)
- Square Dance (1957)
- Gounod Symphony (1958)
- Stars and Stripes (a ballet in five "campaigns") (1958)
- Episodes (1959)
- Tschaikovsky Pas de Deux (1960)
- Monumentum pro Gesualdo (1960)
- Donizetti Variations (1960)
- Liebeslieder Walzer (1960)
- Electronics (1961)
- Raymonda Variations (1961)
- A Midsummer Night's Dream (1962)
- Bugaku (1963)
- Meditation (1963)
- Movements for Piano and Orchestra (1963)
- Harlequinade (1965)
- Brahms–Schoenberg Quartet (1966)
- Jewels (1967)
  - Emeralds
  - Rubies
  - Diamonds
- La Source (1968)
- Who Cares? (1970)
- Tschaikovsky Suite No. 3 (1970)
- Stravinsky Festival (1972)
  - Pulcinella (with Jerome Robbins)
  - Stravinsky Violin Concerto
  - Symphony in Three Movements
  - Duo Concertant
  - Lost Sonata
  - Divertimento from "Le Baiser de la fée"
  - Choral Variations on Bach's "Vom Himmel Hoch"
  - Danses Concertantes
  - Scherzo Á La Russe
- Cortège Hongrois (1973)
- Coppélia (1974)
- Variations pour une porte et un soupir (1974)
- Ravel Festival (1975)
  - Sonatine
  - Tzigane
  - Le tombeau de Couperin
  - Pavane
  - Shéhérazade
  - Gaspard de la Nuit
  - Rapsodie Espagnole
- The Steadfast Tin Soldier (1975)
- Chaconne (1976)
- Union Jack (1976)
- Vienna Waltzes (1977)
- Ballo della Regina (1978)
- Kammermusik No. 2 (1978)
- Robert Schumann's Davidsbündlertänze (1980)
- Walpurgisnacht Ballet (1980)
- Tschaikovsky Festival (1981)
  - Garland Dance from The Sleeping Beauty
  - Mozartiana
- Stravinsky Centennial Celebration (1982)
  - Élégie

=== For New York City Opera ===
- Le Bourgeois Gentilhomme (1979)

== Notes ==
NYC Ballet Premiere May 15, 1975, New York State Theater, Ravel Festival, as L'Enfant et les Sortilèges. https://www.nycballet.com/ballets/s/the-spellbound-child.aspx
