= Maria Calegari =

American ballet dancer, teacher and répétiteur

- Born: March 30, 1957 (age 67); New York, U.S.
- Education: School of American Ballet
- Occupations: ballet dancer; teacher; répétiteur
- Spouse: Bart Cook
- Career
- Former groups: New York City Ballet

Maria Calegari (born March 30, 1957) is an American ballet dancer, teacher and répétiteur. She joined the New York City Ballet in 1974 and became a principal dancer in 1983. She left the company in 1994, then occasionally performed until 2004. She also teaches ballet and began working as a répétiteur for the Balanchine Trust and Robbins Rights Trust in 1996 and 2003 respectively.

== Early life and training ==
Calegari was born on March 30, 1957, in New York. She was raised in Bayside, Queens. She received her ballet training locally before entering the School of American Ballet in 1971, when she was 13, and was taught by Alexandra Danilova. In 1974, at the school's annual workshop performance, she danced excerpts from Danilova's staging of Petipa's Paquita.

== Career ==
Calegari joined the New York City Ballet in 1974. Within a few years, she started being cast in principal and solo roles, several by George Balanchine, including the first movement in his Tschaikovsky Suite No. 3, (Note: At the New York City Ballet, the composer's last name is spelled "Tschaikovsky" rather than "Tchaikovsky" as he used the former spelling during a visit to New York in 1891.) and a televised performance of Divertimento No. 15. She also started understudying roles for principal dancers. In 1981, she originated a role in Peter Martins' Suite From Histoire du Soldat, then was promoted to soloist that spring. Later that year, at the company's Tchaikovsky Festival, she originated roles for Jerome Robbins and Joseph Duell, in Piano Pieces and Introduction and Fugue respectively. In the former, Suzanne Farrell was originally cast in her role but she did not have time to rehearse due to scheduling conflict with other ballets at the festival, therefore Calegari created the role and performed it on opening night. Towards the end of the festival, two principal women were injured, so Calegari took over many roles danced by them, in addition to roles she was already cast in. On one weekend at the end of the season, she danced principal roles in every ballet performed. In 1982, she originated a role in Robbins' The Gershwin Concerto.

Calegari was promoted to principal dancer in 1983, though Balanchine died the same year. She originated roles in Robbins' Glass Pieces (1983), Antique Epigraphs (1984), Eight Lines (1985), Ives, Songs (1988), Robbins and Twyla Tharp's Brahms/Handel (1984) and La Fosse's Waltz Trilogy (1991). She danced lead roles in various Balanchine ballets, including Agon, Serenade, Swan Lake, Chaconne, Jewels, Mozartiana, Union Jack, Apollo, Symphony in C, Liebeslieder Walzer Vienna Waltzes, Robert Schumann's Davidsbündlertänze, Western Symphony, Brahms-Schoenberg Quartet, Variations Pour une Porte et un Soupir, and A Midsummer Night's Dream as Titania. She also danced Robbins' In the Night, Afternoon of a Faun, Dances at a Gathering and The Cage, as well as Helgi Tómasson's Menuetto. She also performed principal roles in televised performances of Balanchine's Apollo, Vienna Waltzes, Union Jack and A Midsummer Night's Dream.

Calegari left the New York City Ballet in 1994. She then gave occasional performances, including with the Suzanne Farrell Ballet, until 2004. She also began teaching ballet, including at her Connecticut-based school between 2002 and 2004. She began staging works on behalf of the Balanchine Trust and Robbins Rights Trust in 1996 and 2003 respectively, including for the Royal Ballet, American Ballet Theatre, San Francisco Ballet and Boston Ballet. In 2010, she and Bart Cook opened CaleCo Ballet Studio in North Salem, New York. In 2011, she was among 30 ballerinas awarded the Jerome Robbins Award.

== Personal life ==
Calegari is married to Bart Cook, also a New York City Ballet principal dancer.
