= Kay Mazzo =

American ballet dancer and educator

- Born: January 17, 1946 (age 79); Chicago, Illinois, U.S.
- Education: School of American Ballet
- Occupations: ballet dancer; educator
- Spouse: Albert Bellas (m. 1978)
- Career
- Current group: School of American Ballet
- Former groups: New York City Ballet; Ballets USA

Kay Mazzo (born January 17, 1946) is an American former ballet dancer and educator. In 1961, she joined Jerome Robbins' company, Ballets USA. The following year, she joined the New York City Ballet and was promoted to principal dancer in 1969. She created roles for George Balanchine and Robbins, before retiring from performing in 1981. She then joined the permanent faculty of the School of American Ballet in 1983, named co-chairman of faculty in 1997 and chair of faculty in 2018. She stepped down from the position in June 2022, but continues to teach.

== Early life ==
Mazzo was born on January 17, 1946, in Chicago, Illinois. She started taking dance lessons at age six and entered the School of American Ballet in New York in 1959, when she was thirteen. Mazzo graduated from the Rhodes Preparatory School.

== Career ==
She joined Jerome Robbins' touring company, Ballets USA, in 1961. She was a New York City Ballet apprentice at the time, but after learning that George Balanchine decided not to cast apprentices in The Nutcracker, she auditioned for Ballet USA out of curiosity, and unbeknownst to her, the company happened to be searching for a "naive-looking" ballet dancer to perform Robbins' Afternoon of a Faun. After Ballets USA disbanded, she returned to New York City Ballet in 1962. In 1964, an eighteen-year-old Mazzo danced her first lead role, in Balanchine's La Valse. In 1965, she was named soloist. Whilst a soloist, she was already given principal role, including in Balanchine's Tchaikovsky Pas de Deux, Liebeslieder Walzer and Cunningham's Summerspace.

Mazzo was promoted to principal dancer in 1969. The same year, she originated the role of Mauve Girl in Robbins' Dances at a Gathering. Suzanne Farrell, Balanchine's muse, left the company shortly before Mazzo's promotion. Balanchine had no understudies for Farrell's role, so Mazzo was cast in these roles, and tasked with learning them quickly, including as Dulcinea in Don Quixote, "Diamonds" from Jewels, Symphony in C, Terpsichore in Apollo, Agon, Movements for Piano and Orchestra, as Titania in A Midsummer Night's Dream and Episodes. Other roles she was cast include Donizetti Variations, divertissement in A Midsummer Night's Dream, Serenade, Square Dance and La Sonnambula.

In 1970, she created roles in Balanchine's Suite No. 3 and Robbins' In the Night. The 1972 New York City Ballet Stravinsky Festival was deemed a breakthrough in Mazzo's career, when Balanchine made three ballets on her, Stravinsky Violin Concerto, Duo Concertant and Scherzo à la Russe. With Farrell's return to New York City Ballet in 1975, roles that were danced by Mazzo for the last few years were returned to Farrell. Mazzo later created three more roles for him, in Union Jack in 1976, Vienna Waltzes in 1977 and Robert Schumann's Davidsbündlertänze in 1980. Mazzo retired from performing in 1981, the year her son was born, as she felt that with the performance schedule, she would not have enough time with her family. Prior to his death, Balanchine gave the rights to Duo Concertant to Mazzo.

After she retired from performing, Mazzo started teaching at the School of American Ballet, at Balanchine's invitation. She joined the school's permanent faculty in 1983, and was named co-chairman of Faculty in 1997, then chair of faculty in 2018. At the school, she formalized the syllabus of the children's division alongside faculty member Katrina Killian, based on teachings by Elise Reiman. Mazzo stepped down from the position in June 2022, but continues to teach advanced classes.

== Personal life ==
In 1978, Mazzo married Albert Bellas, a businessman.
