= Movements for Piano and Orchestra (ballet) =

Ballet by George Balanchine

- Choreographer: George Balanchine
- Music: Igor Stravinsky
- Premiere: April 9, 1963; City Center of Music and Drama
- Original ballet company: New York City Ballet
- Genre: neoclassical ballet

Movements for Piano and Orchestra is a neoclassical ballet choreographed by George Balanchine to Stravinsky's score of the same name. The ballet premiered on April 9, 1963, at City Center of Music and Drama, performed by the New York City Ballet. Though the two lead roles were created for Diana Adams and Jacques d'Amboise, seventeen-year-old Suzanne Farrell danced the female lead at the premiere due to Adams' pregnancy. Starting in 1966, Movements and Monumentum pro Gesualdo (1960) are performed together.

== Choreography ==
Movements for Piano and Orchestra is set to the composition of the same name by Stravinsky, a friend of Balanchine. Balanchine commented that the score's "complexity and compression are remarkable." However, conductor Hugo Fiorato once said, "Who ... would listen to Movements of Stravinsky by itself? ... I don't think I would. But when you hear Movements and you see Movements through Balanchine's eyes and what he has added to the score, it suddenly becomes an amazingly exciting work."

Movements is performed by a lead couple and a corps de ballet consisting of six women. New York Times critic Allen Hughes noted the two leads "are generally engaged in the kind of Balanchine duets that explores the variety of poses for two. It is, in fact, as if Balanchine had examined all the statuary in the world and has summed up all the pose possibilities in this work. Yet the result is not static." Author Richard Buckle noted the corps "alone moves during the terse intermediate sections connecting the five movements and which backs up the principals in the remainder of the ballet." They are often divided to two trios, and "assume an extraordinary variety of poses, like eccentric modern versions of the Three Graces."

Responding to Balanchine's choreography, Stravinsky wrote:

To see Balanchine's choreography of Movements is to hear the music with one's eyes, and this visual hearing has been a greater revelation to me, I think, than to anyone else. The choreography emphasizes relationships of which I had hardly been aware – in the same way – and the performance was like a tour of a building for which I had drawn the plans but never explored the result. Balanchine approached the music by identifying some of the more familiar marks of my style, and as I heard him fastening on my tiniest repeated rhythm or sustaining group, I knew he had joined the work to the corpus of my music, at the same time probably reducing the time lag of its general acceptability by as much as a decade. I owe him even more for another aspect of the revelation: his dramatic point is a love parable – in which ballet is it not? – but the coda had a suggestion of myth that reminded me of the ending of Apollo.

== Production ==
Balanchine conceived the idea of Movements for Piano and Orchestra for Diana Adams, one of his muses at the time, and Jacques d'Amboise as the two leads. In his memoir, d'Amboise wrote that Balanchine "didn't want to be bothered with anyone else" whenever he created a new piece for one of his muses, but ballet master John Taras wanted Balanchine to have an understudy for Adams, and suggested 17-year-old Suzanne Farrell. Farrell was discovered by Adams during an audition tour for the School of American Ballet, and joined the New York City Ballet in 1961. While Farrell attended rehearsals, she was ignored by Balanchine. However, in Farrell's account, Adams "had no official understudy." Stravinsky attended some rehearsals, and he later wrote that when Balanchine requested the dancers to repeat some steps without the music, "To my amazement they were able to count it by themselves, which is rather better than many orchestras. But are the Movements ballet music? Barbarous locution to a Balanchine! What he needs from me is not a pas de deux but a motor impulse."

Two weeks before the premiere, Adams found out she was pregnant. She was ordered by the doctor to be on bed rest, having previously suffered from multiple miscarriages. The news infuriated Balanchine, and he considered having the premiere cancelled. After Taras protested, Balanchine replied, "If you want to do it, do it." According to Farrell's memoir, d'Amboise knew Farrell was a quick learner, and lobbied Balanchine to replace Adams with Farrell. Balanchine initially opposed the idea, but later reluctantly agreed. Less than a week before Movements premiered, d'Amboise brought Farrell to Adams' apartment, where Adams taught Farrell the ballet while lying on the couch. Farrell had never heard the music before, and in that rehearsal, Adams and d'Amboise hummed the music. However, Farrell managed to learn the choreography in two hours. The next day, Farrell, d'Amboise and pianist Gordon Boelzner rehearsed together. That was when Farrell first heard the music. Taras later was able to convince Balanchine to see Farrell in rehearsal. He was impressed by Farrell and provided corrections to both her and d'Amboise. In the days leading up to the premiere, the rehearsals with the corps de ballet were led by Taras. Adams never performed Movements, and eventually left the company. Farrell noted she "had no idea what was going on" at the time, and only learned the full story years later.

At the premiere, the women were dressed in white leotards. Farrell thought black leotards might be more suitable, as she believed they are "more slimming and flattering to the body," and Balanchine approved of this change. However, she "knew it was all wrong" once she saw the corps de ballet on stage. The women's costumes were soon reverted to white leotards. The sole man in the ballet wears a white shirt and black tights.

== Performances ==
Movements for Piano and Orchestra premiered on April 9, 1963, at City Center of Music and Drama, with Robert Irving conducting and the piano played by Gordon Boelzner.

Starting in 1966, Movements and Monumentum pro Gesualdo (1960) are performed together. Balanchine explained, "Both have music by Stravinsky, both are short works, and it has been convenient for our audiences, and for us in the New York City Ballet, to see them combined."

According to Farrell, First Lady Jacqueline Kennedy invited the company to perform Movements at the White House. While Balanchine was "pleased", he rejected the request as the orchestra would not be able to perform. Farrell's company, the Suzanne Farrell Ballet, had revived Movements.

== Videography ==
In 2020, during the COVID-19 pandemic, the New York City Ballet released a 2015 video recording of Movements online, featuring Maria Kowroski and Ask la Cour.
