= Jeu de cartes =

Jeu de cartes may refer to

- A musical composition by Igor Stravinsky from 1936, and also either of two ballets to Stravinsky's music:
- Jeu de cartes (Balanchine) (1937), made by George Balanchine on his American Ballet and danced fourteen years later by New York City Ballet
- Jeu de cartes (Martins) (1992), by Peter Martins for New York City Ballet
