= Balanchine technique =

Ballet performance style

Balanchine technique or Balanchine method is the ballet performance style invented by dancer, choreographer, and teacher George Balanchine (1904–1983), and a trademark of the George Balanchine Foundation. It is used widely today in many of Balanchine's choreographic works. It is employed by ballet companies and taught in schools throughout North America, including the New York City Ballet and School of American Ballet, where it first emerged.

== History ==
In 1924, Balanchine left the Soviet Union and joined Sergei Diaghilev's Ballets Russes in Paris as a choreographer and ballet master. After the death of Diaghilev in 1929, Lincoln Kirstein persuaded him to come to the United States in 1934. There, with Kirstein as his partner, he founded the School of American Ballet in New York City.

During his time in Europe, Balanchine had begun to develop his neoclassical style, partially as a reaction to the Romantic anti-classicism that had led to increased theatricality in ballet. His style focused more on dance movement and construction in relation to music than on plot or characterization. After he came to America, established his school, and eventually founded the New York City Ballet, he continued to refine the principles of training his dancers. And in doing so, Balanchine introduced an aesthetic ideal that would reshape American ballet culture.

Balanchine’s vision demanded extreme thinness and emphasized specific physical attributes that he believed would best support the distinctive style, acrobatic partnering, and speed his choreography required. As a result, he very outwardly preferenced a particular body type– a slender, elongated form with slim hips and long legs –which ultimately set a new standard for American ballerinas.

During the course of his career, in which he choreographed more than 450 ballets, he continued to develop his style and technique of training with a continued emphasis on these body ideals. He became far and away the most prolific force in the nation's ballet community, which led to his long-enduring legacy.

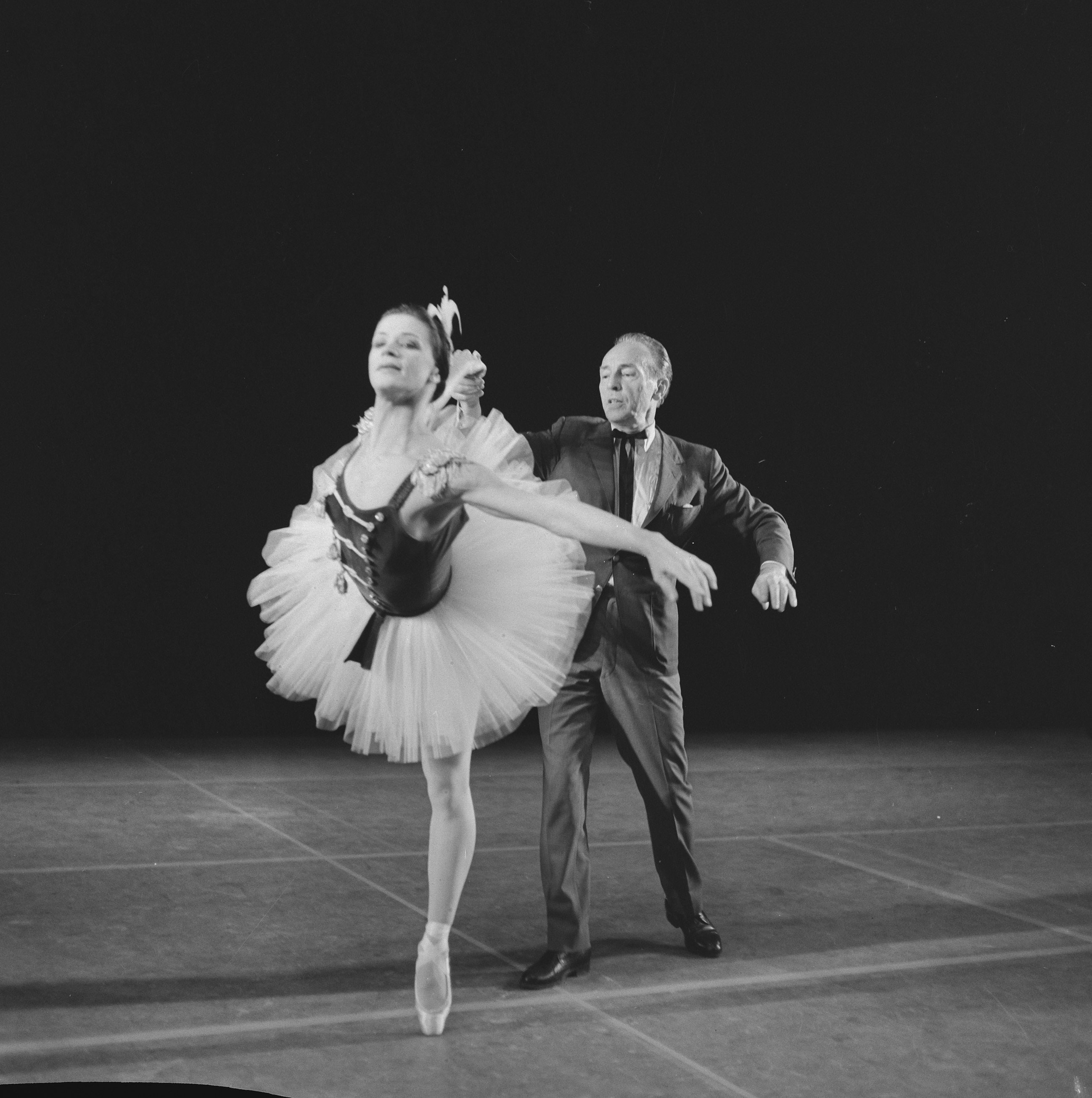
Balanchine assisting a NYCB dancer in performing an arabesque (1965)

== Characteristics ==
Training in Balanchine technique allows dancers to utilize more space in less time, so that speed, spatial expansion and a syncopated musicality are enhanced. Specific characteristics include the following:

- extreme speed and very deep plié
- emphasis on line, with use of unconventional, asymmetrical, abstract arm and hand placement
- pirouettes en dehors taken from a lunge in fourth position rather than the conventional plié in fourth
- distinctive arabesque line with the hip open to the audience and the side arm pressed back
- athletic dance quality.
- fluidity and lightness, best demonstrated by ballerinas with long, thin figures

*Suki Schorer has described the Balanchine arabesque as "longer, stronger and bigger". Balanchine would instruct students to "reach for diamonds" in both directions so the dancer's hands are not relaxed, creating an elongated line.

Balanchine technique is widely recognized for its speed, athleticism, and expansive use of space. However, his approach also reinforced a strict aesthetic code that places considerable emphasis on dancers’, particularly female dancers’, physical appearance. Balanchine believed that a thinner body would enable dancers to achieve a heightened sense of “lightness” and fluidity on stage. Consequently, the thinness he demanded of his company quickly became integral to his stylistic expectations and due to his influence, ultimately expanded into the culture of ballet training as a whole.

== Balanchine's teachings ==
Balanchine was not only known for his groundbreaking choreography but also for his distinct approach to teaching and training dancers which he brought to America. His teaching style was rigorous, seemingly unconventional at the time, and closely aligned with his aesthetic ideals. At the School of American Ballet, which he co-founded in 1934, Balanchine developed a curriculum specifically designed to cultivate the speed, precision, and musicality central to his vision of ballet.

Balanchine’s technique and vision of ballet were closely intertwined with his beliefs about the ideal physical appearance of a dancer, and thus, these bodily ideals played a significant role in his teaching philosophy. He famously advocated for a particular body type that he believed would best suit his choreographic style and this preference is now sometimes referred to as the “Balanchine Body”. According to student accounts, he often encouraged dancers to maintain extremely low weights, telling them that he “must see [their] bones” and to “eat nothing” believing that it would enhance their agility and make for a more beautiful performance.

Balanchine’s emphasis on physical appearance and technique not only affected individual dancers but also established a new standard across the ballet world. Training in his technique not only cultivates a unique dance style but reinforces the association between thinness and success/desirability, which is already so present in our society. His body ideals and training methods have influenced the expectations of many elite ballet companies, where his preference for speed, lines, and thinness are still seen as desirable traits. And at a rapidly increasing rate, these standards are being cited as a reason ballet dancers face higher-than-average rates of eating disorders.

The subculture of Balanchine-trained companies, where physical appearance is tied to the dancer’s role and opportunities, has contributed to a broader cultural narrative that equates thinness with discipline, control, and professional success. And the legacy of Balanchine’s aesthetic preferences continues to remain influential at top ballet companies, including New York City Ballet, where directors explicitly express a preference for dancers who exhibit the “Balanchine look”. As a result, the cultural expectations of thinness in ballet remain pervasive and ultimately, these reinforce aesthetic ideals that prioritize an ultra-thin physique as a hallmark of the art form’s elite tier.

== The Balanchine Essays ==
Toward the latter part of his life, Balanchine talked about creating a "dictionary" of his technique, a visual reference for students of ballet, but never accomplished this goal. Five months after Balanchine's death in 1983, the George Balanchine Foundation was formed to preserve his legacy. It embarked almost immediately upon the first of its major projects, The Balanchine Essays (2013), a video project produced and published by the foundation. Under the stewardship of chairman Barbara Horgan, the foundation fulfilled his wish by producing a series of video recordings demonstrating his technique.

Former New York City Ballet principal dancers Merrill Ashley and Suki Schorer are the co-creators of the project, in which they demonstrate crucial aspects of Balanchine Style and Balanchine Technique (both registered trademarks of the George Balanchine Trust). The Balanchine Essays created by Ashley and Schorer, "provide over nine hours of visual discussion of Balanchine's interpretations of classical ballet technique that are not only educational but also protect the high standards Balanchine himself set for his dancers". The project was directed by veteran television arts director Merrill Brockway and produced by Catherine Tatge, with Barbara Horgan as the executive producer. The set of ten DVDs includes the following titles: Port de Bras & Épaulement, The Barre, Arabesque, Jumps, Pirouettes & Other Turns, Passé & Attitude, Transfer of Weight, and Pointe Technique and Pas de Bourrée.

Balanchine’s legacy in shaping ballet technique and dancer aesthetics is profound and lasting. His influence not only transformed American ballet but left an indelible mark on the global ballet culture. Today, the “Balanchine body” and the principles of his technique continue to be both celebrated and criticized. The standards he established have, according to first-hand accounts from former students, pushed dancers to achieve remarkable physical feats, but have also highlighted mental and physiological dangers that come with maintaining such an exacting ideal.

== See also ==
- Ballet technique
- History of ballet
