= Sonatine =

Sonatine can refer to:

- Sonatine (1984 film), a Canadian film
- Sonatine (1993 film), a Japanese film
- Sonatine (Ravel), a 1906 piano composition by Maurice Ravel
- Sonatine (Stockhausen), a 1951 chamber music composition by Karlheinz Stockhausen
- Sonatine (ballet), a 1975 ballet choreographed by George Balanchine
- "Sonatine", a 2017 song by Loona from Love & Evil

== See also ==
- Sonatina
