= La Valse (Balanchine) =

- Choreographer: George Balanchine
- Music: Maurice Ravel
- Premiere: February 20, 1951; City Center of Music and Drama
- Original ballet company: New York City Ballet
- Design: Karinska; Jean Rosenthal
- Genre: neoclassical ballet

La Valse is a ballet choreographed by George Balanchine to Maurice Ravel's Valses Nobles et Sentimentales and La Valse. It premiered on February 20, 1951, at the City Center of Music and Drama, performed by the New York City Ballet. The ballet depicts dancers waltzing in a ballroom, during which a woman becomes attracted to a figure of death, and ultimately dies.

== Choreography ==
The first part of the ballet is set to Valses Nobles et Sentimentales, which features eight waltzes, with the first used as an overture. The second waltz features three female soloists, while the third, fourth and fifth waltzes are each danced by a couple. The woman from the fifth waltz then dances a solo during the sixth waltz. In the seventh waltz, her partner returns to the stage, joined by the three soloists from the second waltz and the woman exits.

In the eighth waltz, a ballerina in white enters and dances. A man then enters. Dance critic Richard Buckle described, "They do backbends and at first seem not to know each other. They dance with a ceremonial and slightly depraved elegance." At the end of the waltz, the man lifts the ballerina and they exit the stage. Tanaquil Le Clercq, who originated the ballerina role, recalled, "the atmosphere was lovely, it was like going to a party. There wasn't anything terribly hard in the variation, and yet you could work within what you had and make it different. Balanchine said to think of German-style contractions for it – a feeling for 'plastique.'"

The La Valse section follows. At first, dancers search for each other under the spotlight. Balanchine wrote, "All the dancers seem to be waiting for the waltz to emerge through the weird music that holds it in abeyance." As the stage brightens, a corps de ballet of eight men and sixteen women waltzes, and the fifth waltz couple also returns. Then the ballerina in white and her partner enters and dances. Balanchine described, "Their dance is slow at first; the ballerina's movements are retarded and she seeks to move more freely as the waltz attempts to resume its previous intensity." But, as the music intensifies, "The girl turns with despairing speed to her partner's arms."

Then, a figure of Death, (Note: While the role was not named in the program, Balanchine called the role "Death." Francisco Moncion, who originated the role, specifically recalled that Balanchine asked him to portray "Death".) in black, emerge alongside his servant. The women kneels before him while the men looks away. The white ballerina is terrified but attracted to Death. He forces her to put on black necklace, gloves and dress, as she becomes more fascinated, before presenting her with a bouquet. As the music goes faster, Death forces the ballerina to dance faster and faster, "almost mindlessly", as Le Clercq described. She ultimately dies, while Death disappears. Le Clercq remarked, "the dramatic mood grew completely out of the steps." The corps de ballet resumes their waltzing. The ballerina's partner carries her dead body, before she is lifted by a group of men, who turn around and around at the centre of the stage.

In 1974, Balanchine made a revision to the ballet, so Death would make a brief appearance in the Eighth Waltz. Balanchine told dancer Francisco Moncion that he had "always wanted to have the figure of Death somewhere in the first section as a premonition." Therefore, as Moncion put it, "there is a special place for him in the Eighth Waltz. The figure appears from nowhere in the spotlight, suddenly and only for a moment, just as she is going off, and it's very frightening."

== Original cast ==
Section	Principal dancers
Second Waltz	Vida Brown, Edwina Fontaine, Jillana
Third Waltz	Patricia Wilde, Frank Hobi
Fourth Waltz	Yvonne Mounsey, Michael Maule
Fifth Waltz	Diana Adams, Herbert Bliss
Sixth Waltz	Diana Adams
Seventh Waltz	Herbert Bliss, Vida Brown, Edwina Fontaine, Jillana
Eight Waltz	Tanaquil Le Clercq, Nicholas Magallanes
La Valse	Tanaquil Le Clercq, Nicholas Magallanes, Francisco Moncion

== Production ==
In 1951, Balanchine decided to choreograph to a ballet to Maurice Ravel's La Valse. Ravel wrote the score as a ballet for ballet impresario Sergei Diaghilev, who rejected it. However, the score had been use for several unsuccessful ballets. Finding La Valse too short, Balanchine decided to also include Valses Nobles et Sentimentales, which William Dollar previously choreographed to for Ballet Caravan, Balanchine's former company. Moncion's character was not named in the program notes. However, Moncion specifically recalled Balanchine asking him to portray a figure of Death, and the latter had also referred the role as "Death". Le Clercq did not receive any notes about acting or reactions from Balanchine.

Valses Nobles et Sentimentales, originally written for the piano, was orchestrated for the ballet. At the time, the New York City Ballet Orchestra was incapable of performing a score this large in scale. However, after being pressured by conductor Léon Barzin, the City Center of Music and Drama, managing director Morton Baum allowed the company to add a dozen more musicians. The costumes, ball gowns for women and evening suit for men, took inspiration from France, and were designed by Karinska, who had lived in Paris prior to moving to the United States. The original lighting was designed by Jean Rosenthal.

== Performances ==
La Valse premiered on February 20, 1951, at the City Center of Music and Drama, with Barzin conducting. It was removed from the company's repertory in 1956, when Le Clercq became paralysed after contracting polio. La Valse was then not performed until 1962, after Le Clercq, who had avoided ballet for some years, taught her role to Patricia McBride. Moncion and Nicholas Magallanes were the only original cast members to reprise their roles at this revival, though Jillana took over the role that was originated by Diana Adams.

Other ballet companies that have performed La Valse include the Kirov Ballet, Stuttgart Ballet, Dutch National Ballet, Pacific Northwest Ballet, Los Angeles Ballet, and Suzanne Farrell Ballet.

== Critical reception ==
New York Times critic John Martin commented, "There was a challenge in the music for Balanchine is not to be denied; in accepting it he has been forced to extend himself in new directions, and the result is a ballet which, though still characteristically Balanchinian, has many exciting variations from that norm. Under the surface, indeed, is the fundamental quality of a different Balanchine altogether."

== Videography ==
In June 1953, La Valse was featured in Premiere, the first commercially sponsored television program to be broadcast in color that was aired by CBS, staged by Sol Hurok.

In 2015, La Valse was filmed during the New York City Ballet's appearances at Théâtre du Châtelet. It was aired on PBS Great Performances broadcast "New York City Ballet in Paris" in 2017.

Footage of Le Clercq in La Valse were featured in Nancy Buirski's documentary Afternoon of a Faun: Tanaquil Le Clercq.
