= Duo Concertant (ballet) =

Ballet by George Balanchine

- Choreographer: George Balanchine
- Music: Igor Stravinsky
- Premiere: June 22, 1972; New York State Theater
- Original ballet company: New York City Ballet
- Created for: Kay Mazzo; Peter Martins
- Genre: Neoclassical ballet

Duo Concertant is a ballet choreographed by George Balanchine to Stravinsky's score of the same name. The ballet was created for New York City Ballet's Stravinsky Festival, a tribute to the composer a year after his death, and premiered on June 22, 1972, at the New York State Theater, danced by Kay Mazzo and Peter Martins.

== Choreography ==
Duo Concertant is danced by a man and a woman, alongside a pianist and a violinist, both onstage. Kay Mazzo, an original cast member of Duo Concertant, said, "In Duo Concertant Peter Martins and I just did the same thing over and over. Balanchine said that's what the music does."

In the first of five movements, Cantilena, the dancers simply stand and listen to the music. According to Mazzo, Balanchine told her, "Now we're going to have them listen." In the next movement, the first Eclogue, the two dancers, as New York Times critic Anna Kisselgoff described, "start dancing as if the music impels them to do so." Commenting on this movement of the ballet, dance critic Richard Buckle wrote, "The two dancers experiment." The pair retreat to the piano when the second Eclogue begins, he then "leads her to a pas de deux." This is followed by the Gigue, which Buckle described, "They dance both alone and together."

There is a blackout before the final movement, Dithyrambe. This movement is performed under a spotlight. Kisselgoff analysed, "the woman seemingly represents a muse. She and the man cannot find each other at first but finally she remains rooted to the spot as he kneels at her feet: the lover before his feminine ideal, the cavalier before the ballerina, Balanchine's artistic ideal." Mazzo was stunned by the emotional ending, "It was quite unusual for [Balanchine] in his Stravinsky ballets."

== Production ==
Stravinsky and Balanchine collaborated for many years until the former's death in 1971. The latter then decided to have the New York City Ballet hold the week-long Stravinsky Festival to honor the composer. There were at least 20 premieres, seven of which were choreographed by Balanchine.

Duo Concertant was made on Kay Mazzo and Peter Martins. The festival marked the first time Balanchine choreographed on Martins, who in addition to Duo Concertant, also created a role in Stravinsky Violin Concerto. Rehearsals started on April 11, 1972, and according to author Nancy Goldner, it was given fourteen hours. Mazzo, however, felt it was not complete until the last minute. The dress rehearsal was held on the morning of the premiere. Balanchine did not tell the dancers he planned to have a blackout before the fifth movement until that rehearsal.

Prior to Balanchine's death, he gave the rights of Duo Concertant to Mazzo.

== Performances ==
Duo Concertant premiered on June 22, 1972, at the New York State Theater. Other ballet companies that have performed the ballet include The Royal Ballet, American Ballet Theatre, Boston Ballet, Birmingham Royal Ballet, Pacific Northwest Ballet and the Suzanne Farrell Ballet.

== Videography ==
In 1975, Mazzo and Martins reprised their roles in Duo Concertant for the PBS Great Performances program "Three by Balanchine with the New York City Ballet."

In 2004, Duo Concertant was filmed for a PBS Live from Lincoln Center broadcast performance, this time for Balanchine's centenary celebration, with dancers Yvonne Borree and Peter Boal, violinist Cho-liang Lin and pianist Cameron Grant.

In 2020, during the COVID-19 pandemic, the New York City Ballet released a 2019 archival recording of Duo Concertant online, featuring dancers Megan Fairchild and Anthony Huxley, violinist Arturo Delmoni and pianist Elaine Chelton.

In 2021, for New York City Ballet's first virtual gala, an excerpt of Duo Concertant, danced by Ashley Bouder and Russell Janzen, was featured in a film made by Sofia Coppola.
