= Electronics (ballet) =

Ballet by George Balanchine

- Choreographer: George Balanchine
- Music: Remi Gassmann and Oskar Sala
- Premiere: March 22, 1961; City Center of Music and Drama
- Original ballet company: New York City Ballet

Electronics is a science fiction ballet choreographed by George Balanchine for New York City Ballet, set to a score composed by electronic music pioneers Remi Gassmann and Oskar Sala. Commissioned by architect Philip Johnson, the ballet premiered on March 22, 1961, at New York City Center.

== Choreography and production ==
Performed several times in the 1961 Spring season, the original cast consisted of Diana Adams, Violette Verdy, Jacques d'Amboise, Edward Villella, and 8 dancers from the corps de ballet.

With scenic and lighting design from David Hays the dance “takes place in an atmosphere of science fiction, the setting cellophane, the costumes white, silver, gold, black.”

== Music ==
One of the earliest fully electronic scores used in ballet and concert dance, the score utilized both the mixtur-trautonium, an early synthesizer, and electronic tape manipulation. Harman Kardon installed loudspeakers in the theater so the score could be heard by the audience. The music was later released as an album by Westminster Records.

Electronics was the second collaboration between Gassmann and Sala, as they had written and recorded the score for choreographer Tatjana Gsovsky’s ballet Paean in 1960 the year before. Sala and Gassmann would go on to collaborate on the score for Alfred Hitchcock’s The Birds.

== Critical reception ==
New York Times dance critic John Martin praised the ballet as a “considerable piece of art” while also confessing it was “not exactly world-shaking.” Martin was especially enthusiastic about the music and what it might portend for the future, comparing it to “nuclear fission” and “interplanetary exploration.” , while also noting it was “ideally suitable for choreographic visualization.”

The poet and dance writer Edwin Denby was less enthusiastic, writing that the ballet “achieves an impeccably fatuous banality” and “is not a ballet to be proud of. It puts on a highbrow act, but what it delivers is middlebrow Radio City corn.” Denby did note that the dance was “a big hit with press and public.”

New York Herald Tribune dance critic Walter Terry described Electronics as “the first major space-age ballet.” While conceding it was “not, I think, a Balanchine masterwork,” he did write that the ballet was “by no means minor Balanchine.”

Winthrop Sargeant, writing for The New Yorker, called the musical result “quite fascinating” while praising the “stunning set made of plastic ice crystals” yet also said the “ballet that Mr. Balanchine had concocted to go with this curious musical experience was somewhat swamped by the sounds” and “the choreography as a whole was not much more than one of Mr. Balanchine’s expert but conventional essays in abstract movement.”
