= Stravinsky Violin Concerto (ballet) =

Neoclassical ballet

- Choreographer: George Balanchine
- Music: Igor Stravinsky
- Premiere: June 18, 1972; New York State Theater
- Original ballet company: New York City Ballet
- Genre: neoclassical ballet

Stravinsky Violin Concerto, originally titled Violin Concerto, is a neoclassical ballet choreographed by George Balanchine to Stravinsky's Violin Concerto. Balanchine had previously choreographed another ballet to the concerto in 1941 for the Original Ballet Russe, titled Balustrade, though it was not revived following a few performances. He then reused the concerto for New York City Ballet's Stravinsky Festival in 1972, a tribute to the composer following his death. The ballet premiered on June 18, 1972, at the New York State Theater.

== Background and production ==
Balanchine first choreographed a work to Stravinsky's Violin Concerto in 1941 for the Wassily de Basil's company Original Ballet Russe, titled Balustrade, with costumes and sets designed by Pavel Tchelitchew. In his previous Stravinsky ballets, Balanchine usually followed a plot. However, Balustrade is completely plotless, and was Balanchine's response to the Violin Concerto. The ballet premiered on January 22, 1941 at Fifty-first Street Theatre, New York, with a cast led by Tamara Toumanova, Paul Petroff and Roman Jasinski. Stravinsky himself conducted while Samuel Dushkin played the violin. Balustrade had only been performed three times. However, Stravinsky called it "one of the most satisfactory visualisations of any of my works".

Balanchine and Stravinsky continued to collaborate frequently until the latter's death in 1971. Balanchine then planned to have his company, the New York City Ballet, to hold a week-long Stravinsky Festival in June 1972, as a tribute to the composer. The festival featured 20 premieres, seven choreographed by Balanchine. Balanchine reused Stravinsky's Violin Concerto for one of the new works, at the time titled Violin Concerto. By then, he had preferred to use the titles composers gave to their music. When biographer Bernard Taper asked about Balustrade, Balanchine responded, "Stravinsky never wrote Balustrade; he wrote Violin Concerto. The ballet should be announced as what it is. Then the musician can come, the young people who love music and who want to hear the composition – they'll know what they're getting. They don't have to look at the ballet if it bores them, they can just listen to the music. And that's fine with me, that's wonderful." The ballet had since been retitled as Stravinsky Violin Concerto.

Karin von Aroldingen, a member of the original cast who had danced with the New York City Ballet for ten years, said in Stravinsky Violin Concerto, "Balanchine used everything I had for the first time." Peter Martins, who joined the two years prior, said, "Violin Concerto was my chance to show that I could dance 'Balanchine'." Unlike Balustrade, the dancers in Stravinsky Violin Concerto are dressed in practice clothes, with the women in leotards and black footless tights, men in white T-shirts and black tights.

Stravinsky Violin Concerto was regarded as one of the "masterworks" out of the festival. After Balanchine died, the world rights of Stravinsky Violin Concerto and five other ballets went to von Aroldingen.

== Choreography ==
Stravinsky Violin Concerto is Balanchine's direct response to the music. In the opening Toccata, the four lead dancers, each grouped with a four-person corps de ballet, are introduced one by one. Dance critic Zoe Anderson wrote that this section is "bright and exuberant".

It is followed by Aria I, created on Karin von Aroldingen and Jean-Pierre Bonnefoux. Though von Aroldingen saw herself as a "realistic dancer," Balanchine asked her to dance like a snake, "You know, a bit sneaky." Dance critic Richard Buckle commented, "The opening chord on the strings warns that the relationship between this man and woman will not be a placid one. Her dance with her partner contains strange confrontations, tangles, stalking, catching, trapping; but she somersaults away from his last embrace, and he suddenly lies flat, as if he had enough."

Aria II was made on Kay Mazzo and Peter Martins. Both of them found it difficult to learn the choreography, though it was not noticed by the audience. Mazzo noted it was because Balanchine knew what was the most suitable her and Martins. Anderson described, "The ballerina clings to her partner, wrapping herself around him then standing sheltered in his arms. At the end of the movement he kneels and she leans against him, his arm curved over her like a blindfold."

The ballet ends with a Capriccio featuring the cast of twenty dancers, entering the stage in groups of ten, dancing what Anderson called "lively, folk-flavoured steps, skipping on their heels and hopping to Stravinsky's intricate rhythms". Once the entire cast is onstage, the dancers "bursts into the finale".

== Performances ==
Stravinsky Violin Concerto premiered on June 18, 1972 at the New York State Theater, on the first program of the Stravinsky Festival. Other ballet companies that had revived Stravinsky Violin Concerto include The Royal Ballet, American Ballet Theatre, San Francisco Ballet, Dutch National Ballet, National Ballet of Canada, Birmingham Royal Ballet, Pacific Northwest Ballet and Boston Ballet.

== Videography ==
Stravinsky Violin Concerto was filmed for PBS's 1977 Dance in America broadcast, with original cast members Mazzo, von Aroldingen and Martins reprising their roles, while the role made on Bonnefous was danced by Bart Cook. Balanchine adjusted the choreography for the cameras.

In 2020, during the COVID-19 pandemic, the New York City Ballet released a 2018 video recording of the finale of Stravinsky Violin Concerto, featuring Sterling Hyltin, Ask la Cour, Sara Mearns and Taylor Stanley, in his New York City debut of the role. A full recording of the ballet with the same cast was released online in March 2021.
