= Ask la Cour =

Danish ballet dancer

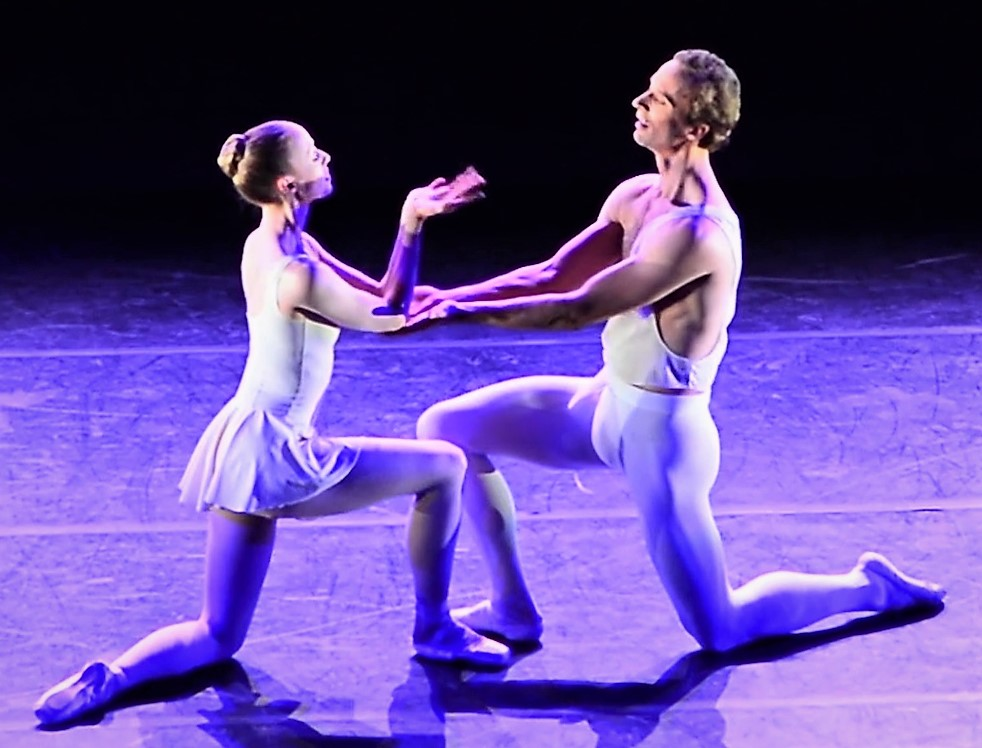
- la Cour (right) with Teresa Reichlen in Apollo in 2017
- Born: Ask la Cour Rasmussen; 1981 or 1982 (age 43–44); Copenhagen, Denmark
- Education: Royal Danish Ballet School
- Occupation: ballet dancer
- Years active: 2000–2021
- Career
- Former groups: New York City Ballet; Royal Danish Ballet

Ask la Cour Rasmussen (born 1981 or 1982) is a Danish ballet dancer. He joined the Royal Danish Ballet in 2000, then moved to the New York City Ballet in 2002, and was promoted to principal dancer in 2013. He retired from the company in 2021.

== Early life ==
Ask la Cour was born in Copenhagen, and is the son of ballet dancer and former Royal Danish Ballet associate artistic director Lise la Cour and conductor Frans Rasmussen. His maternal half-brother, Nilas Martins, was a principal dancer with the New York City Ballet. As a child, he had no interest in ballet, instead preferring soccer and skateboarding. However, when he was nine, he overheard his mother telling a friend the Royal Danish Ballet School needed more boys, so he decided to audition for the school, and was accepted.

== Career ==
La Cour joined the Royal Danish Ballet in 2000, and was soon cast in solo roles. Two years later, he approached Peter Martins, Nilas Martins' father who heads the New York City Ballet, about joining the company, and was accepted. He later stated that he originally intended to stay at the company for a few years. He made his company debut in Balanchine's The Nutcracker. He started dancing solo roles while still in the corps de ballet, before becoming a soloist in May 2005. He was promoted to principal dancer in February 2013.

In his career, he had danced 60 ballets, including works by George Balanchine, Jerome Robbins, Peter Martins, August Bournonville, Christopher Wheeldon, Justin Peck, Alexei Ratmansky, Benjamin Millepied, Jorma Elo, Susan Stroman, Lauren Lovette, Boris Eifman, Robert Binet and Richard Tanner. He also originated roles in some ballets, such as Wheeldon's Shambards and After the Rain, Ratmansky's Voices, Peck's The Most Incredible Thing and Lovette's Not Our Fate.

In January 2020, la Cour became the artistic director of the Commack, New York-based Frank Ohman School of Ballet and New York Dance Theatre. He retired from the New York City Ballet in October 2021, and danced Balanchine's Monumentum pro Gesualdo, Movements for Piano and Orchestra and Wheeldon's After the Rain at his farewell performance. He then returned to the Royal Danish Ballet to teach and coach apprentices.
