= Bayou (ballet) =

Bayou is a ballet made by New York City Ballet's co-founder and ballet master George Balanchine to Virgil Thomson's Acadian Songs and Dances (1947). The premiere took place on 21 February 1952 at City Center of Music and Drama, New York.

== Original cast ==
- Francisco Moncion
- Doris Breckenridge
- Melissa Hayden
- Hugh Laing
- Diana Adams
- Herbert Bliss

== Reviews ==
- NY Times by John Martin, 22 February 1952

== Articles ==
- NY Times by Joseph Carman, 28 February 1999
