= Glass Pieces =

Ballet by Jerome Robbins to music by Philip Glass

- Choreographer: Jerome Robbins
- Music: Philip Glass
- Premiere: May 12, 1983; New York State Theater
- Original ballet company: New York City Ballet
- Design: Ben Benson; Jerome Robbins; Ronald Bates
- Genre: Neoclassical ballet

Glass Pieces is a ballet choreographed by Jerome Robbins to music by Philip Glass, costumes designed by Ben Benson, lighting designed by Ronald Bates and production designed by Robbins and Bates. The ballet was premiered on May 12, 1983, at the New York State Theater, performed by the New York City Ballet.

== Production ==
Choreographer Jerome Robbins was first invited to direct Philip Glass's opera, Akhnaten. Due to the unusual nature of the opera, Robbins decided to make a ballet with the music first and figure out the stage directions. However, due to scheduling conflict, Robbins withdrew from the opera, but went ahead with the ballet.

Though the score is minimal, Robbins decided to treat it differently. He made charts of the music's structure on graph paper, then worked with Ronald Bates, who also designed the lighting, to make backdrop that looks like a piece of graph paper. Robbins also added "Rubric" and "Façades" from Glass's Glassworks, as the scores "struck him as being markedly different in character". Robbins also claimed that since he was focused on the music during the creative process, he was surprised to see the critics interpret it as "images of urban life". On the entire ballet Robbins said it has a "a ritualistic sense" which may be "inevitable" due to Glass's music.

The ballet was the first New York City Ballet (NYCB) work set to minimalist music and premiered shortly after the company's co-founder George Balanchine's death.

== Structure ==
The first part, "Rubric", features dancers in bright color practice wears walking across the stage, and three main couples performing different choreography. Whenever the couples enter the stage, the corps de ballet changes its movements. Robbins said it is like a rondo.

The middle section is set to "Façades", which Robbins described as "a songlike melody repeated five times". The principal couple is the equivalent of the score while an all-female corps dances at the back of the stage in a line, representing the accompaniment.

The third and final movement, danced to "Akhnaten", is called "tribal" by Robbins, with dancers performing in bloc patterns.

== Original cast ==
Rubric:

- Heléne Alexopoulos
- Lourdes Lopez
- Lisa Hess
- Peter Frame
- Joseph Duell
- Victor Castelli

Façades:

- Maria Calegari
- Bart Cook

== Revivals ==
Other ballet companies that have performed Glass Pieces include the Paris Opera Ballet, Joffrey Ballet and San Francisco Ballet. The former two companies and NYCB all included the ballet in their Robbins Centennial celebrations.

== Videography ==
In light of the impact of the COVID-19 coronavirus pandemic on the performing arts, Paris Opera Ballet released a video recording of Glass Pieces as a part of the Tribute to Jerome Robbins program. NYCB released a 2017 video recording of the third movement.
