= Ivesiana =

Ballet by George Balanchine

- Choreographer: George Balanchine
- Music: Charles Ives
- Premiere: September 14, 1954; City Center of Music and Drama
- Original ballet company: New York City Ballet
- Design: Jean Rosenthal
- Genre: Neoclassical ballet

Ivesiana is a ballet choreographed by George Balanchine to compositions by Charles Ives. The ballet premiered on September 14, 1954, four months after Ives's death, at the City Center of Music and Drama, performed by the New York City Ballet. Balanchine made several changes to the ballet since, including adding and removing sections of the ballet, and the final version of Ivesiana consists of Central Park in the Dark, The Unanswered Question, In the Inn and In the Night.

== Production ==
Balanchine first learned about Charles Ives in 1934, despite his works being rarely performed at the time. Later, he attended a concert of Ives' works conducted by Léon Barzin. While he was fascinated, he also found Ives' works "incredibly difficult, far too complex for dancing." Years later, after completing a ballet to music by Arnold Schoenberg, Balanchine decided to choreograph to Ives' works. Balanchine stated that he found the rhythm in Ives' works most interesting, and also found "the shock necessary for a new point of view." Balanchine was "saddened" by the fact that he never met Ives or tell him he planned to use his music, as Ives "seemed inaccessible." The ballet is titled Ivesiana as a tribute to Ives. The dancers were dressed in practice clothes. The original lighting was designed by Jean Rosenthal.

Ivesiana marked the first time Balanchine choreographed a major role in Allegra Kent, then a seventeen-year-old corps de ballet member, who had been in the New York City Ballet for two years. In her memoir, Kent recalled that she learned that she was cast the night before the first rehearsal. She later stated she believed she was given the role because "[Balanchine] saw in me the psychological raw material that could be molded and remolded into images of sensuality - unrealized and restrained, but there, just under the surface."

Ivesiana premiered on September 14, 1954, at the City Center of Music and Drama, four months after Ives' death. The performance was attended by Ives' widow. The original version of Ivesiana featured six works by Ives, Central Park in the Dark, Hallowe'en, The Unanswered Question, Over the Pavements, In the Inn, and In the Night. In March 1955, six months after the premiere, Balanchine replaced Hallowe'en with Arguments from String Quartet No. 2, with Patricia Wilde and Jacques d'Amboise, the principal dancers from Hallowe'en returning. In November that year, Arguments was replaced with Barn Dance from the first movement of A Symphony: New England Holidays, with Wilde and d'Amboise again dancing the principal roles. It then fell out of the New York City Ballet's repertory, until a revival in 1961. Both Barn Dance and Over the Pavements were removed from the ballet. Additionally, In the Inn was rechoreographed. Instead of Tanaquil LeClercq and Todd Bolender from the original cast, Diana Adams and Arthur Mitchell danced the new version of the movement. The lighting had been redesigned, while some of the costumes had since been replaced, resembling street clothes.

The New York City Ballet rarely revives Ivesiana. During New York City Ballet's 1978 spring season, Peter Martins' Calcium Light Night, to Ives' music of the same name, was inserted in Ivesiana, with the order of The Unanswered Question and In the Inn reversed, and Calcium Light Night performed before In the Night. The ballet had also been performed by the Dutch National Ballet and Berlin Opera. The Unanswered Question is sometimes performed separately, such as by the Suzanne Farrell Ballet. Following Balanchine's death in 1983, the American and media rights to Ivesiana went to Edward Bigelow, a dancer and administrator at the New York City Ballet, as well as a friend of Balanchine.

== Structure and choreography ==
The first movement of Ivesiana is set to Central Park in the Dark, danced by a principal couple and an all-female corps de ballet. In his book Balanchine's Complete Stories of the Great Ballets, the choreographer wrote, "As the names Ives gave to his music so vividly describe them, I would hope that they also tell what the dance might be about... which is a meeting between a girl who is lost and a boy and how they become lost together, in the dark in a place like Central Park." Patricia McBride, who performed the principal female role of this movement in revivals, recalled, 'Balanchine told me to close my eyes and pretend I was a blind person. I practiced trying to find something as if I couldn't see. It's very difficult because it's just walking, it's groping, trying to really feel with your hands."

The second movement is set to The Unanswered Question and features another principal couple and four men. Balanchine did not follow the remarks Ives wrote for this score, instead this movement is about "a girl all-knowing like a sphinx to whom a man might turn." Allegra Kent, who originated the female role, wrote that while the role is not technically difficult, she was "definitely 'manhandled'" by the four men. She also wrote, "In this role I was manipulated - threaded under legs and pulled into splits - all the time remaining passive and inaccessible, The woman in this ballet ultimately represents the unattainable. She attracts and eludes the man who tries to grasp her. The mystery is never solved, the question never answered."

The third movement is set to In the Inn. Balanchine remarked, "This is as informal as its music, with a dance by two young people. As the music echoes old-time dance rhythms, the dancers' steps do too. They act exhausted at the end, shake hands and part."

The fourth and final movement of the ballet is set to In the Night, a score that was described as "a brief, tranquil melody with instants of unrest" by dance critic Marcia B. Siegel. It is performed by the corps de ballet. Balanchine simply wrote that this movement "must speak for themselves in the theatre". New York Times critic Jack Anderson described, "Balanchine has a large ensemble cross the stage on their knees. And that's all that happens. Yet one gains the impression that these people may be praying, despairing or mourning, or doing all of these things at once."

== Original cast ==
Movements	Principal dancers
Central Park in the Dark	Janet Reed; Francisco Moncion
Hallowe'en	Patricia Wilde; Jacques d'Amboise
The Unanswered Question	Allegra Kent; Todd Bolender
Over the Pavements	Diana Adams; Herbert Bliss
In the Inn	Tanaquil LeClercq; Todd Bolender
In the Night	ensemble

== Critical reception ==
Following the premiere of Ivesiana, New York Times critic John Martin wrote, "It is strictly for the Balanchine admirers who recognize his genius and are eager to 'assist' at anything that he feels under inner compulsion to do. Here he has manifestly cut loose and allowed himself the full freedom of creation. Fortunately he has a company that understands him and is able to give him virtually anything he wants. The result will not please everybody, but it is honestly inspired and wonderfully wrought."

Dance critic Edwin Denby commented, "Ivesiana develops no speed of momentum at all, no beat; it is carried onward as if way below the surface by a force more like that of a tide, and the sharp and quickly shifting rhythms that appear have no firm ground to hold against an uncanny, supernatural drift. Ivesiana is a somber suite, not of dances, but of dense and curious theater images."

In her book Repertory in Review: 40 Years of the New York City Ballet, author Nancy Reynolds summarized reviews of Ivesiana, and found The Unanswered Question to be "the most arresting episode", while Central Park in the Dark, In the Inn and In the Night were also well-received, but not Hallowe'en and Over the Pavements, the movements Balanchine eventually removed.

== Videography ==
In 2020, during the COVID-19 pandemic, the New York City Ballet released a 2013 video recording of The Unanswered Question, featuring Janie Taylor and Anthony Huxley.
