= Bugaku (ballet) =

1963 American ballet

Bugaku is a ballet made by New York City Ballet co-founder and ballet master George Balanchine to eponymous music by Toshiro Mayuzumi, commissioned by City Ballet in 1962. The premiere took place on 30 March 1963 at City Center of Music and Drama, New York, with scenery by David Hays, costumes by Karinska, and lighting by Ronald Bates. NYCB had toured Japan in 1958 and the Gagaku Company of the Imperial Household toured the US the following year.

Bugaku is the dance component of gagaku.

== Original cast ==
- Allegra Kent
- Edward Villella

== Reviews ==
- NY Times review by Allen Hughes, August 30, 1963
- NY Times review by Clive Barnes, November 20, 1976
- NY Times review by Anna Kisselgoff, April 29, 1984
- NY Times review by Anna Kisselgoff, March 20, 1987
- NY Times review by Alastair Macaulay, January 19, 2008
- review in the New York Sun by Joel Lobenthal, June 1, 2007
- review by Deborah Jowitt in the Village Voice, February 5, 2008
- review in Dance View Times by Alexandra Tomalonis, November 25, 2007

== Articles ==
- NY Times article by Allen Hughes, March 22, 1963
- NY Times article by Anna Kisselgoff, April 5, 1987
