= Brahms–Schoenberg Quartet =

1966 ballet by George Balanchine

- Choreographer: George Balanchine
- Music: Johannes Brahms; Arnold Schoenberg
- Premiere: April 21, 1966; New York State Theater
- Original ballet company: New York City Ballet
- Design: Barbara Karinska; Peter Harvey; Ronald Bates
- Genre: Neoclassical ballet

Brahms–Schoenberg Quartet is a one-act ballet by George Balanchine, to Johannes Brahms's Piano Quartet No. 1, orchestrated by Arnold Schoenberg. The ballet premiered on April 21, 1966 at the New York State Theater, performed by the New York City Ballet.

== Background and production ==
Arnold Schoenberg's orchestration of Johannes Brahms's Piano Quartet No. 1 premiered in 1937. According to the George Balanchine Trust, Balanchine had said the chamber music were "too long, with too many repeats, and meant for small rooms", therefore went with the Schoenberg version. The ballet is plotless and has four movements, titled Allegro, Intermezzo, Andante and Rondo Alla Zingarese. In the original production, Barbara Karinska, Peter Harvey and Ronald Bates designed the costumes, sets and lighting respectively. In 1985, two years after Balanchine died, NYCB switched to a new set designed by David Mitchell, Mark Stanley later redesigned the lighting.

Brahms–Schoenberg Quartet premiered on April 21, 1966, performed by the New York City Ballet. On the premiere, The New York Times critic Clive Barnes called the ballet "careful but tedious". Another reviewer, Anna Kisselgoff, wrote in 1985 that the ballet is not one of Balanchine's best, and in 1994 noted that the ballet is "too inconsistent" to be a masterpiece and "demands a strong performance."

In 2016, the Paris Opera Ballet performed Brahms–Schoenberg Quartet with new sets and costumes by Karl Lagerfeld. The San Francisco Ballet had also performed the ballet.

== Casts ==
- World premiere: World premiere: Melissa Hayden, Gloria Govrin, Patricia McBride, Allegra Kent, Suzanne Farrell, André Prokovsky, Conrad Ludlow, Edward Villella, Jacques d'Amboise
- Paris Opera Ballet premiere (2016): Dorothée Gilbert, Mathieu Ganio, Sabrina Mallem, Amandine Albisson, Stéphane Bullion, Myriam Ould-Braham, Mathias Heymann, Laura Hecquet, Karl Paquette
