= Sonatine (ballet) =

Ballet choreographed by George Balanchine

- Choreographer: George Balanchine
- Music: Maurice Ravel
- Premiere: May 15, 1975; New York State Theater
- Original ballet company: New York City Ballet
- Created for: Violette Verdy; Jean-Pierre Bonnefoux

Sonatine is a ballet choreographed by George Balanchine to Ravel's eponymous music. The ballet was made for the New York City Ballet's Ravel Festival, which celebrated the centenary of Ravel, and premiered on May 15, 1975, at the New York State Theater, following a preview performance the previous day. The ballet was originated by Violette Verdy and Jean-Pierre Bonnefoux.

== Choreography ==
In his book Balanchine's Complete Stories of the Great Ballets, Balanchine described the ballet, "The pianist and the dancers are on stage together when the curtain goes up on the ballet. The pianist begins to play; the girl and the boy stand up and listen. They like what they hear, apparently, for they begin to move to it, following its line, and gradually becoming imbued with its spirit."

== Production ==
Balanchine decided that for French composer Maurice Ravel's centenary in 1975, the New York City Ballet would hold the Ravel Festival to honor him. In the previous forty years, Balanchine had only made two ballets to Ravel's works. However, he stated he always enjoyed his music and decided "it would be a good idea to celebrate this wonderful composer’s life and work by arranging new dances to as many scores as we could." The festival featured sixteen premieres. While some were large productions, others, including Sonatine, were much smaller productions, which were "a few minutes long, simply using Ravel’s music and making what we could of it." Two French-born principal dancers, Violette Verdy and Jean-Pierre Bonnefoux, were chosen to originate the two roles in the ballet. Verdy in particular had not created roles for Balanchine for several years prior to Sonatine.

== Performances ==
Sonatine had a preview performance on May 14, 1975, at the New York State Theater, during a gala benefit attended by French and American dignitaries. The following day, the ballet had its official premiere, as the first ballet performed at the Ravel Festival. Madeleine Malraux played the piano at the premiere.

In 2004, the New York City Ballet included Sonatine in its Balanchine centenary celebration, with the ballet danced by guest artists from the Paris Opera Ballet, Aurélie Dupont and Manuel Legris. In 2015, Sonatine was filmed during the New York City Ballet's appearances at Théâtre du Châtelet, Paris. It was aired on PBS Great Performances broadcast "New York City Ballet in Paris" in 2017.

Other ballet companies that have performed Sonatine include the Paris Opera Ballet, which performed the ballet during a tribute program to Verdy in 2016, as well as the Miami City Ballet and Suzanne Farrell Ballet.

== Critical reception ==
Following the premiere of Sonatine, New York Times critic Clive Barnes commented, "The form of the duet – with its casual dancers around a piano – recalls Duo Concertante [sic] in its calculated informality, and Mr. Balanchine's dances hug the music comfortably. The mood is light and rhapsodic, but there are a few happy moments of unaffected originality."
