= Requiem Canticles (Balanchine) =

Requiem Canticles is a ballet made by New York City Ballet co-founder and balletmaster George Balanchine to eponymous music from 1966 by Igor Stravinsky in memoriam Martin Luther King, Jr. It received a single performance on May 2, 1968, at the New York State Theater, Lincoln Center, conducted by Robert Irving with Margaret Wilson, contralto, and John Ostendorf, bass. Costumes and candelabra were by Rouben Ter-Arutunian and lighting by Ronald Bates, the corps de ballet in long white robes bearing a three-branched candelabra. A lone woman searches among them and at the end a figure in purple representing Martin Luther King, Jr., is raised aloft.

== Original cast ==
- Suzanne Farrell

corps de ballet

- Arthur Mitchell
