= The Steadfast Tin Soldier (ballet) =

1975 ballet by George Balanchine

- Choreographer: George Balanchine
- Music: Georges Bizet
- Based on: "The Steadfast Tin Soldier" by Hans Christian Andersen
- Premiere: July 30, 1975; Saratoga Performing Arts Center
- Original ballet company: New York City Ballet
- Design: David Mitchell
- Created for: Patricia McBride; Peter Schaufuss
- Genre: Neoclassical ballet

The Steadfast Tin Soldier is a ballet choreographed by George Balanchine to Bizet's Jeux d'enfants, based on Hans Christian Andersen's 1838 fairytale of the same name of the love between a tin soldier and a paper-doll ballerina. The ballet premiered on July 30, 1975, at the Saratoga Performing Arts Center, with New York City Ballet's Patricia McBride and Peter Schaufuss.

== Production ==
George Balanchine first used Bizet's Jeux d'enfants for a 1955 project, in collaboration with choreographers Barbara Milberg and Francisco Moncion, danced by Melissa Hayden and Roy Tobias. It was revived four years later, with the choreography only credited to Balanchine.

The 1975 version, a pas de deux, was commissioned by the Saratoga Performing Arts Center, where the New York City Ballet performs annually, and premiered on Bizet's centennial year, performed by Patricia McBride and Peter Schaufuss. The ballet uses sets and costumes designed by David Mitchell. After he made The Steadfast Tin Soldier, Balanchine, who had adapted Andersen fairytales before, said what attracted him to fairytales by Andersen was the "underlying Christian substructure". The 1975 ballet premiered in New York City the following year.

In 2020, in response to the impacts of the coronavirus pandemic on the performing arts, the New York City Ballet released a 2014 video recording of The Steadfast Tin Soldier, featuring Erica Pereira and Daniel Ulbricht.
