= Circus Polka =

1942 orchestral polka by Igor Stravinsky

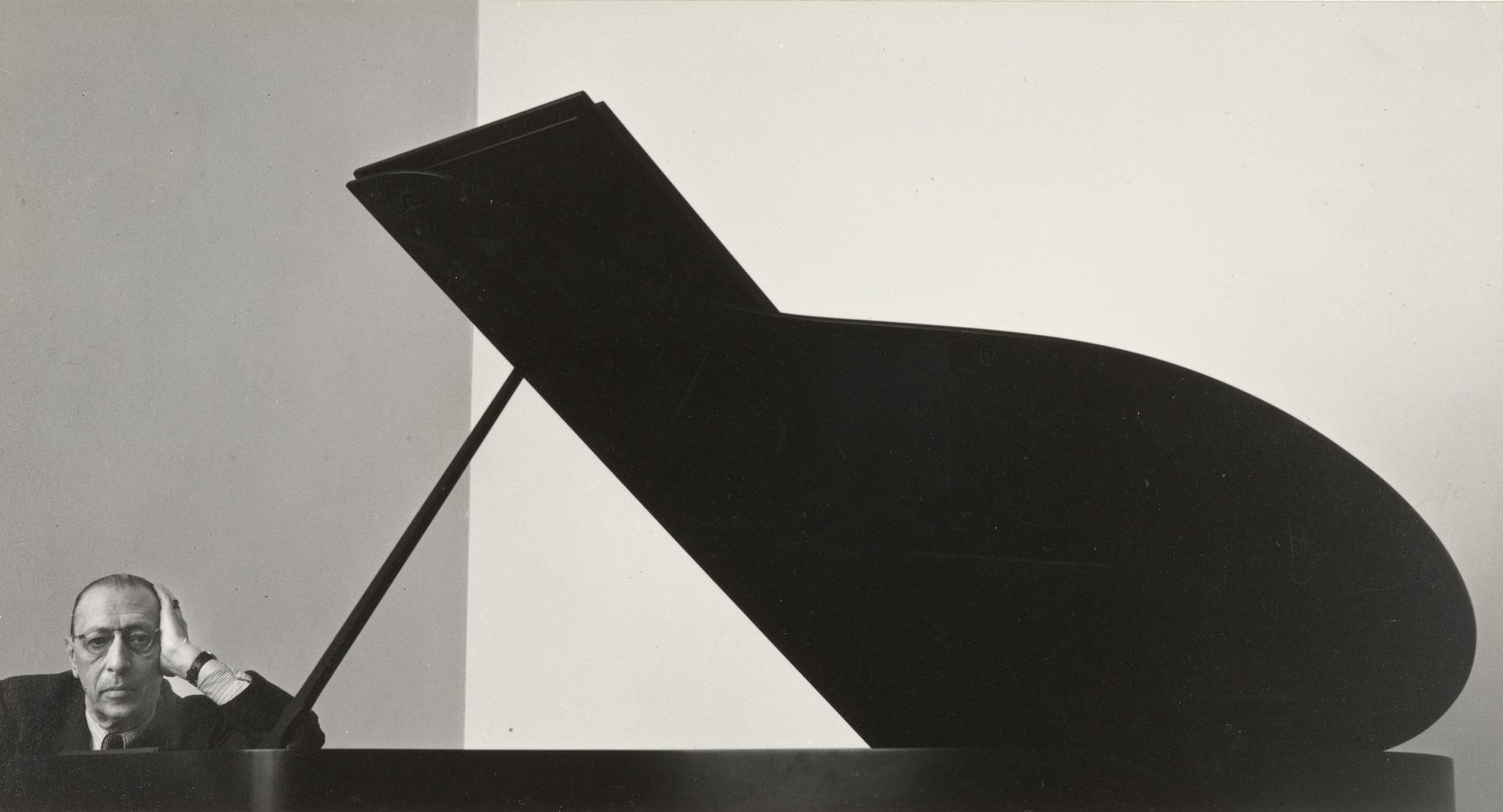
Photograph of Igor Stravinsky by Arnold Newman

Circus Polka: For a Young Elephant was written by Igor Stravinsky in 1942, and scored for wind band and Hammond organ by David Raksin. Stravinsky wrote it for a ballet production that the choreographer George Balanchine did for Ringling Bros. and Barnum & Bailey Circus. The ballet was performed by fifty elephants and fifty ballerinas. Stravinsky's own orchestration was prepared later, and was premiered on 14 January 1944 by the Boston Symphony Orchestra, Stravinsky conducting.

== Composition ==
Igor Stravinsky and George Balanchine first met in 1925, as Balanchine, who just had started working for Sergei Diaghilev's Ballets Russes, choreographed the ballet version of Stravinsky's Le chant du rossignol. This was the start of a long friendship and many years of collaboration, which continued after both emigrated to the United States in the 1930s.

In late 1941, the Ringling Brothers & Barnum & Bailey Circus made Balanchine the unusual proposal to do the choreography for a ballet involving the circus's famous elephant group in the spring of the following year in New York. Balanchine immediately suggested bringing in Stravinsky, much to the delight of the circus company. However, Stravinsky was only contacted by phone on January 12, 1942. Balanchine would later recount the conversation as follows:

Balanchine: "I wonder if you'd like to do a little ballet with me."
Stravinsky: "For whom?"
Balanchine: "For some elephants."
Stravinsky: "How old?"
Balanchine: "Very young."
Stravinsky: "All right. If they are very young elephants, I will do it."

Although Stravinsky was busy with other projects at the time, he negotiated a high fee with the Ringling Brothers & Barnum & Bailey Circus for a short instrumental, which he composed within a few days. The piano version of Circus Polka, subtitled "For a Young Elephant" as an allusion to the phone conversation with Balanchine, was finished on February 5, 1942.

Although the piece is, according to its name, a polka, it does contain a number of changes in rhythm. It only sounds like a polka towards the end, but this part is actually a borrowing from Franz Schubert's Marche Militaire No. 1 in D major, D. 733. Stravinsky always denied that this was a parody of the Marche Militaire. He later called the whole piece a satire, the musical equivalent to Henri de Toulouse-Lautrec's drawings, but his notes do not reflect this.

By the time the ballet was performed, Stravinsky was no longer involved with the project. The arrangement of the piece for an organ and a concert band was done by David Raksin. Balanchine choreographed the Circus Polka for fifty elephants and fifty human dancers, led by the cow elephant Modoc and by Balanchine's wife at the time and principal ballerina Vera Zorina respectively. The elephants, including the bulls, were decked out in pink ballet tutus. Reporters were at first concerned that Stravinsky's music might cause the elephants to panic. Balanchine was eventually able to teach Modoc the choreography.

The show, advertised as a "choreographic Tour de Force", premiered at Madison Square Garden on 9 April 1942. The performance was successful and the crowd was particularly enthusiastic about Balanchine's extraordinary ballet. After this debut, Ringling Brothers performed the ballet another forty-two times, but Stravinsky did not attend any of the shows.

== The Ballet ==
Balanchine’s ballet paired each elephant with one of the young women in the circus’s corps de ballet. For its 9 April 1942 premiere, dancer Vera Zorina (married to Balanchine) made a one-time appearance. Columnist Elsa Maxwell attended, and later described the performance:

Forty-seven exquisite, exotic, enormous elephants gallumphed into the ring to music by Stravinsky. They were clad in diaphanous ballet skirts and were topped off with 46 lovely ballerinas perched on their domes—like Mahouts. The forty-seventh was the luscious, zunctious Zorina. I rubbed my eyes. The little elephant skirts were playing hell with priorities. Little flowers were coquettishly draped over one flappingear of each terpsichorean pachyderm. The principal danseuse [Zorina] wore large, drooping, jeweled earrings….The plastic poses these great but gentle beasts affected were so perfect in composition as to put to shame the granite frieze on the front of the Parthenon. And the delicacy and care with which they avoided hurting or bruising the lovely ballerinas as they scooped them, with infinite grace, high into the air was something both touching and beautiful to behold. The corps de ballet darted in and out among the elephant legs, treating these columns with the high regard you would expect them to reserve for the Egyptian peristyles in the Temple of Karnak. Zorina’s classic features showed no suggestion of fear as she was clasped in the caressing coils of a trunk; instead she embraced it with warmth and grace which would befit her approach to Balanchine or an Anton Dolin. The whole ballet, I afterward learned, was a miracle in celerity. Stravinsky wrote the music for it in only three weeks. Zorina rehearsed her part for only five days. And Balanchine confessed to me that he got the whole choreography and training accomplished within the space of six weeks. When the ballet was finished and the audience roared with excitement and joy at this quite prehisoric and unbelieveable scene.

== Replacement Music for Ringling Brothers ==
The circus's 1942 season began at Madison Square Garden on 9 April, though their contract with American Federation of Musicians ended on 31 May. During the midsummer labor dispute that followed, the circus performed to "records [made by union musicians] and a steam calliope," and not a live band. For the Balanchine ballet, Weber's "Invitation to the Dance" replaced the Stravinsky score.

== Piano Scoring ==
The solo piano scoring was premiered by pianist Shura Cherkassky in Los Angeles at Philharmonic Hall on 13 November 1942. Cherkassy had earlier told an interviewer, "I am most happy that my Russian-born, now American-citizen compatriat, Igor Stravinsky, has accorded me the honor of introducing his new composition, 'Circus Polka, which I am sure the audience will find interesting." The solo piano version was published in 1942, and a violin-and-piano version by Sol Babitz published in 1943.

== Versions ==
Two years after he composed the piano version, Stravinsky re-arranged the Circus Polka for an orchestra. This version was premiered along with Four Norwegian Moods by the Boston Symphony Orchestra in January 1944 with Stravinsky as director. During the following months a number of charity concerts to support the U.S. Army fighting in World War II were held and broadcast over the radio. Stravinsky reported that after one such broadcast he received a telegram from an elephant called Bessie who had taken part in the ballet in 1942, and whom he then met in Los Angeles. After listening to another such broadcast, Charles de Gaulle ordered the sheet music for the piece and took it back home to France. The orchestration soon became part of the repertoire of many orchestras and is popular to this day, especially at children's concerts.

George Balanchine re-choreographed the piece for a one-time performance by students from the School of American Ballet, which took place on 5 November 1945 at Carnegie Hall, directed by Lincoln Kirstein. After Jerome Robbins became ballet master at New York City Ballet in 1972, he created a new ballet to Stravinsky's music featuring young dance students and an adult ringmaster for their Stravinsky Festival. Since, it has become a regular piece, often with a guest ringmaster, most notably Mikhail Baryshnikov and in 2008 with Robert La Fosse.

In 2006, a children's book detailing the history of the Circus Polka, Leda Schubert's Ballet of the Elephants, appeared in the United States.

== Notes ==
=== Sources ===
- Anon. (April 10, 1942). "Circus Opens Amid New Brilliance". The New York Times. p. 14. PDF scan
- Craft, Robert; Stravinsky, Igor (2002). Memories and Commentaries. London: Faber and Faber. ISBN 0-571-21242-5.
- Joseph, Charles M. (2001). Stravinsky Inside Out. New Haven: Yale University Press. ISBN 0-300-07537-5.
- Joseph, Charles M. (2002). Stravinsky and Balanchine: A Journey of Invention. New Haven: Yale University Press. ISBN 0-300-08712-8.
- Krista, Davida (1996). George Balanchine: American Ballet Master. Minneapolis: Lerner Publication. ISBN 0-8225-4951-4.
- Macauley, Alastair (May 1, 2008). "Step Right Up, Kids (and Thank the Dance Gods You're Not Elephants)". The New York Times.
- Schubert, Leda (2006). Ballet of the Elephants. New Milfort: Roaring Brook Press. ISBN 1-59643-075-3.
- Wenborn, Neil (1999). Stravinsky. London: Omnibus Press. ISBN 0-7119-7651-1.

== Reviews ==
- "Review/Ballet; Robbins Over the Years: Fresh Amid the Familiar" by Anna Kisselgoff, The New York Times, June 8, 1990
- "Fledgling Dancers, Already Fluent in Two Languages: Balanchine and Robbins" by Alastair Macaulay, The New York Times, June 4, 2008
- "Robbins the Contrarian Will Now Bow, Thanks" by Alastair Macaulay, The New York Times, June 12, 2008
