= Tschaikovsky Suite No. 3 =

Ballet by George Balanchine

Tschaikovsky Suite No. 3 is a ballet made by New York City Ballet co-founder and founding choreographer George Balanchine to Tschaikovsky's Suite No. 3 for Orchestra in G major, Op. 55 (1884). The premiere took place on 3 December 1970 at the New York State Theater, Lincoln Center, with scenery and costumes by Nicolas Benois.

== Theme and Variations ==
Balanchine set the final movement of Tschaikovsky's third orchestra suite in 1947 for Ballet Theatre under the title Theme and Variations. He incorporated this choreography substantially unchanged into Tschaikovsky Suite No. 3 as the fourth–and final–movement, which is sometimes called Tema con variazioni, when he set the entire suite.

== Original cast ==
- Karin von Aroldingen
- Kay Mazzo
- Marnee Morris
- Gelsey Kirkland
- Anthony Blum
- Conrad Ludlow
- John Clifford
- Edward Villella
