= Noah and the Flood (ballet) =

Noah and the Flood is a ballet choreographed by George Balanchine, co-founder and balletmaster of the New York City Ballet, and Jacques d'Amboise to Stravinsky's The Flood (1962). The premiere took place June 11, 1982, at the New York State Theater, Lincoln Center. The text was chosen and arranged by Robert Craft from Genesis, the Te Deum and Sanctus hymns, and the 15th century York and Chester miracle plays.

== Original cast ==
- Adam Luders
- Nina Fedorova
- Bruce Padgett
- Francisco Moncion
- Delia Peters

== Articles ==
- Time magazine, article, Friday, June 22, 1962
