= Diana Adams =

American ballerina and ballet teacher (1926–1993)

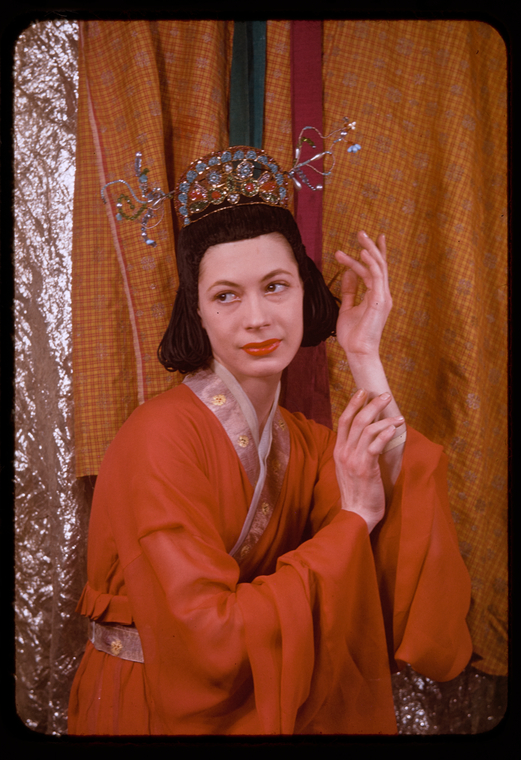
- Born: March 29, 1926; Staunton, Virginia, US
- Died: January 10, 1993 (aged 66); San Andreas, California, US
- Occupations: ballerina, teacher

Diana Adams (March 29, 1926 – January 10, 1993) was a principal dancer for the New York City Ballet from 1950 to 1963 and favorite of George Balanchine, later becoming a teacher at — and dean of — the School of American Ballet.

Adams was born in Staunton, Virginia and died in San Andreas, California, though she lived in Arnold, California. Adams was married to Hugh Laing from 1947 to 1953. She later married Ronald Bates. Adams had one child, Georgina Bates.

Diana Adams was one of George Balanchine's "muses" at New York City Ballet and he created roles for her in a series of ballets: Western Symphony, Ivesiana, Divertimento #15, Agon, Stars and Stripes, Episodes, Monumentum Pro Gesualdo, and Liebeslieder Walzer. According to Jacques D'Amboise's memoirs, Balanchine also created roles on her in Tchaikovsky Pas de Deux, Figure in the Carpet, Midsummer Night's Dream, and Movements for Piano and Orchestra, although she did not dance in the premieres due to illness or injury.

== Filmography ==
- Knock on Wood (1954)
- Invitation to the Dance (1956)
