= Scotch Symphony =

- Choreographer: George Balanchine
- Music: Felix Mendelssohn
- Premiere: November 11, 1952; City Center of Music and Drama
- Original ballet company: New York City Ballet
- Design: Karinska; David Ffolkes; Horace Armistead; Jean Rosenthal

Scotch Symphony is a ballet choreographed by George Balanchine to Mendelssohn's Symphony No. 3, "Scottish". The ballet is inspired by Scotland, and evokes the style of the romantic ballet era, particularly La Sylphide, which is set in Scotland. Scotch Symphony was made for the New York City Ballet, and premiered on November 11, 1952, at the City Center of Music and Drama.

== Choreography ==
The program for Scotch Symphony stated,

Balanchine [like Mendelssohn] wishes to evoke the sweep and freshness, the brilliance and strength inherent in the Highland landscape. He has invented a classic ballet based on atmosphere and music, with an affectionate nod to the romantic tradition that made the hero of La Sylphide a Highlander.

The ballet is set to Mendelssohn's Symphony No. 3, "Scottish". Dance critic Richard Buckle described Scotch Symphony as "one of those Balanchine ballets ... that hover between romance and comedy or pastiche." Author Nancy Reynolds wrote, "Choreographically, the ballet contains many steps, gestures and poses allusive of the romantic era." She also noted the lead ballerina role "requires a high level of technique tempered by lightness, grace, and the quality of an otherworldly vision." Dancer Patricia Wilde noted that Balanchine asked the dancers to be on their toes to emulate Scottish highland dancing.

The first movement features a girl and boys, all in kilts, along with a pas de trois and a solo for the girl. The second movement is an adagio danced by a ballerina and her partner. Though it is plotless, Balanchine wrote that it "represents ... the general mood and atmosphere of the romantic ballet as epitomized in such ballets as La Sylphide." The third and final movement features the lead couple and the ensemble, in which the two lead dancers perform a pas de deux and variations, before the soloists and corps de ballet join them for the finale.

== Development ==
In August 1952, while the New York City Ballet was performing at Edinburgh Festival, towards the end of the company's first European tour, George Balanchine attended the Searchlight Tattoo. Having enjoyed both the military tattoo and his visit to Scotland, and inspired by bagpipe and Scottish highland dance performances, Balanchine decided to make a Scottish-themed ballet. Development of the ballet began after the company returned to New York. He chose to set the ballet to Mendelssohn's Symphony No. 3, also inspired by a visit to Scotland, but removed the first movement, which Balanchine found to be "not appropriate for dance." He also decided to evoke La Sylphide, "the first great romantic ballet", which features a Scottish setting.

Maria Tallchief and André Eglevsky originated the two lead roles, while Patricia Wilde created the female role in the first movement, along Frank Hobi and Michael Maule as the two other dancers in the pas de trois. While working on the ballet, Balanchine and Tallchief were in the process of having their marriage annulled, though it had little impact on their artistic collaborations. Though Tallchief was known for her dazzling dancing style, her role in this ballet required more light and graceful techniques. Wilde believed that in emulating Scottish highland dance, the dancers became prone to injuries, including "terrible calf cramps and shin splints."

Karinska designed the women's costumes while David Ffolkes designed the men's. Horace Armistead and Jean Rosenthal designed the set and lighting respectively.

== Performances ==
Scotch Symphony premiered on November 11, 1952, at the City Center of Music and Drama.

In 1989, Scotch Symphony, along with Theme and Variations, became the first Balanchine ballets performed by the Kirov Ballet in St. Petersburg, where he had danced in the 1920s as a student and young professional dancer before leaving for the West.

Other ballet companies that performed the ballet include the San Francisco Ballet, Washington Ballet, Joffrey Ballet, Pennsylvania Ballet, Atlanta Ballet and Kansas City Ballet. Students of the School of American Ballet, the associate school of the New York City Ballet, performed the ballet as part of its annual workshop performance.
