= Karin von Aroldingen =

German ballet dancer

- Born: Karin Anny Hannelore Reinbold von Aroldingen; 9 September 1941; Greiz, Thuringia, Germany
- Died: 5 January 2018 (aged 76); New York City, U.S.
- Occupation(s): Dancer, choreographer, ballet mistress, répétiteur
- Spouse: Morton Gewirtz
- Children: 1
- Career
- Former groups: American Festival Ballet; Frankfurt Opera Ballet; New York City Ballet

Karin Anny Hannelore Reinbold von Aroldingen (9 September 1941 – 5 January 2018) was a German ballet dancer. She danced as a soloist at the Frankfurt Opera Ballet before joining the New York City Ballet in 1962 after receiving a personal invitation from George Balanchine. She was named as one of Balanchine's main beneficiaries in his will. Von Aroldingen retired from New York City Ballet in 1984, having reached the rank of principal dancer in 1972. In her later life, she worked as a répétiteur for the Balanchine Trust, for which she was also a founder, staging his ballets for various companies.

== Early life ==
Karin von Aroldingen was born on 9 September 1941 in Greiz, Germany. Her family, part of the German nobility, was originally from Berlin but evacuated during World War II. Her father, a scientist, disappeared on his way to Czechoslovakia for a work trip. Her mother moved the family from East Germany to West Berlin after the war ended. She became interested in dancing when she was nine years old and auditioned for a private ballet school and was awarded an eight-year scholarship. When she was ten years old, she was chosen from among two-hundred dancers to dance the title role in The Little Match Girl. She trained in Russian ballet, modern dance, and folk dance.

== Career ==
When von Aroldingen was sixteen years old she joined the corps de ballet of the American Festival Ballet for an eight-month run. During this time she met Tatjana Gsovsky, who hired her to dance with the Frankfurt Opera Ballet. Her first lead role was in Kurt Weill's The Seven Deadly Sins. She was eventually promoted to first soloist at the Frankfurt Opera Ballet.

In 1962 she met George Balanchine at an audition in Hamburg. He invited her to join New York City Ballet. Her first performance with New York City Ballet was as a monster in Igor Stravinsky's The Firebird. Her second role was as a demi-soloist in Georges Bizet's Symphony in C. She was promoted to soloist in 1967. In 1972 she was promoted to principal dancer. She was the first female lead in Stravinsky Violin Concerto, dancing the pas de deux with Jean-Pierre Bonnefoux. She also danced the role of the Siren in Balanchine's The Prodigal Son, Titiana in A Midsummer Night's Dream, the Emeralds walking duet in Jewels, and a lead role in Serenade. When she was in her mid-twenties she began teaching children's classes at the School of American Ballet while dancing with the company.

As a principal dancer with New York City Ballet, she had eighteen roles created for her including in Who Cares?, Union Jack, Stravinsky Violin Concerto, Robert Schumann's Davidsbündlertänze, Vienna Waltzes, Kammermusik No. 2, Cortège Hongrois, and Variations Pour une Porte et un Soupir. Jerome Robbins created a role for her in The Goldberg Variations.

Throughout her career she had partnered with many notable male dancers including Peter Martins, Mel Tomlinson, Jean-Pierre Bonnefoux, Bart Cook, and Sean Lavery.

She retired from the stage in 1984 and helped establish the Balanchine Trust. She joined New York City Ballet's artistic staff as a ballet master in 2004 and retired in 2016.

== Personal life ==
Von Aroldingen married Morton Gewirtz. They had one daughter, Margo.

She enjoyed painting and studied at the Art Students League of New York during dance layoffs.

When George Balanchine died in April 1983, von Aroldingen was named as one of his heirs. She inherited the royalties of 37 ballets to be shared with Balanchine's former personal assistant, Barbara Horgan. She also inherited a $200,000 co-op apartment in Manhattan and Balanchine's Mercedes-Benz automobile. She was left the rights to six of his ballets: Serenade, Stravinsky Violin Concerto, Liebeslieder Walzer, Une Porte et Un Soupir, Vienna Waltzes, and Kammermusik No. 2. Von Aroldingen gave out cuttings of rubber plants to dancers, all from a plant that had been given to her by Balanchine.

Von Aroldingen died, at the age of 76, on 5 January 2018 at her home in Manhattan.
