= Allegra Kent =

American dancer

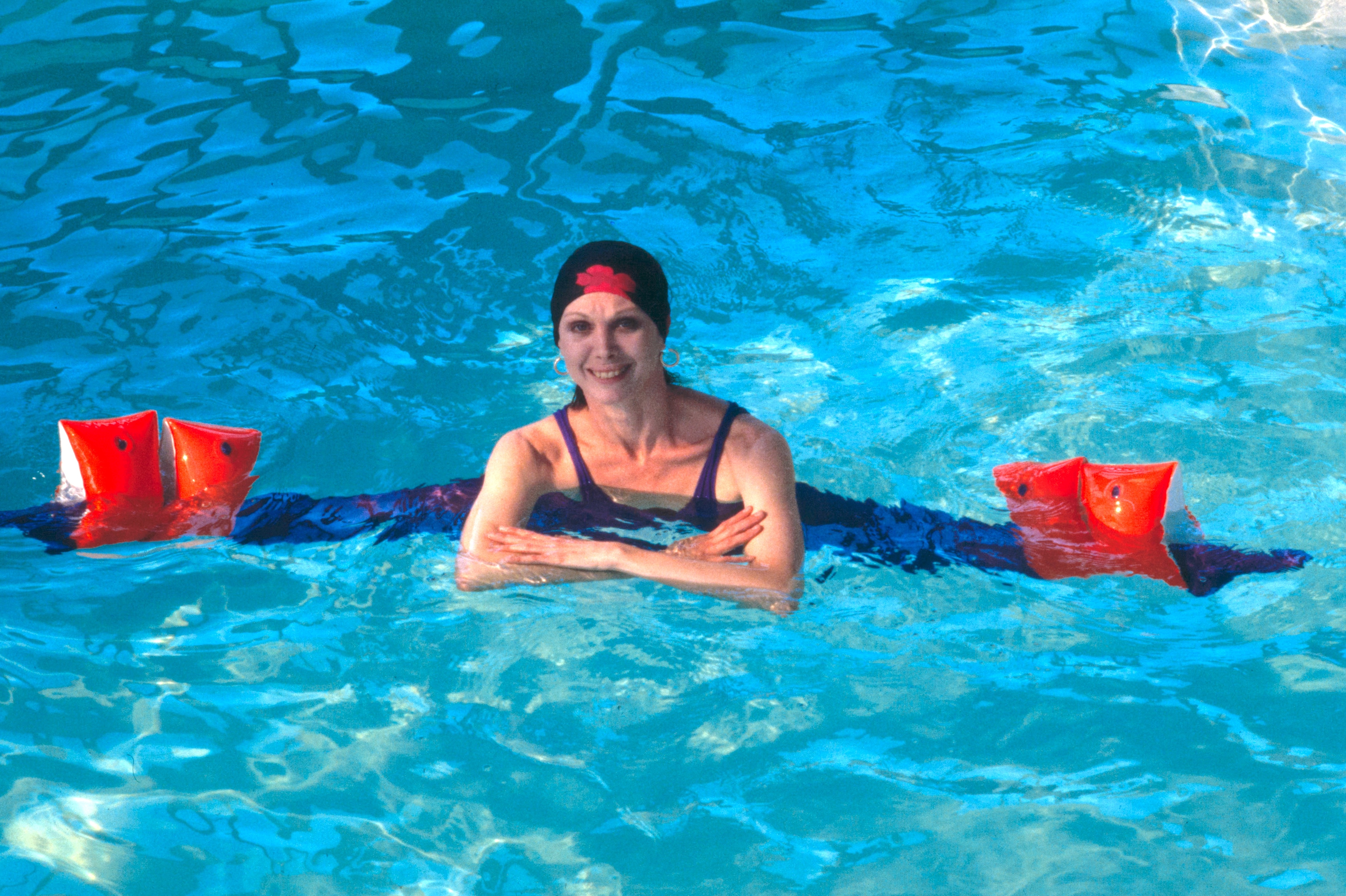
- Kent doing water aerobics in New York in 1978
- Born: Iris Margo Cohen; August 11, 1937 (age 89); Santa Monica, California, U.S.
- Occupations: Ballet dancer, dance instructor, actress, children's author, and columnist
- Years active: 1953-1981
- Dancing career
- Former groups: New York City Ballet

Allegra Kent (born August 11, 1937) is an American ballet dancer, dance instructor, actress, children's author, and columnist.

== Life and career ==
Iris Margo Cohen was born to Jewish parents, Harry Herschel Cohen and Shirley (née Weissman) Cohen, in Santa Monica, California and later changed her name to Allegra Kent. She had a brother, Gary Cohen, and a half-sister, actress Wendy Drew. Kent grew up in what she later described as a dysfunctional environment. In Once a Dancer: An Autobiography, she described her Texan father – "who liked to substitute 'Cowboy' for Herschel" – as having "a gambler's soul and a restless nature". She described her Wisznice-born immigrant mother as feeling "neither European nor American; she was ashamed of her [own] parents. She borrowed a neighbor's working papers and took a job at twelve. By fourteen, she was teaching ballroom dancing at night in someone's private home, mostly to Japanese men".

Kent studied with Bronislava Nijinska and Carmelita Maracci before joining the School of American Ballet. She discovered music and dance at the age of 7 and enjoyed both, but she was 11 before she took her first ballet lesson. She had completely flat feet as a little girl and consulted a doctor, who prescribed wedges in her shoes to give her arches. She then began taking ballet.

After graduating, she joined the New York City Ballet in 1953 at the age of 15, and was promoted to principal in 1957. Many roles in George Balanchine's ballets were created for her, including Seven Deadly Sins, Ivesiana and Bugaku. She danced the role of Dewdrop in the 1958 Playhouse 90 telecast of Balanchine's version of The Nutcracker.

She performed in such ballets as Serenade, Agon and Dances at a Gathering. She retired in 1981, becoming a ballet teacher, and in 1997 published an autobiography, Once a Dancer. In 2012, Kent published her first book for children, Ballerina Swan, with Holiday House Books for Young People, illustrated by Caldecott Medalist Emily Arnold McCully. It received good reviews from The New York Times, Kirkus Reviews, and School Library Journal.

In 2013, Ballerina Swan was adapted for the stage as a dance piece by the New York City Children's Theater, featuring choreographer Michael McGowan and artistic director Barbara Zinn Krieger. The adaptation received positive reviews by The New York Times, Time Out New York Kids, and others. Due to its success, in December 2015, New York City Children's Theater produced a revival of "Ballerina Swan". As of 2015, Kent was teaching ballet at Barnard College.
