= Union Jack (ballet) =

Union Jack is a ballet made by New York City Ballet co-founder and founding choreographer George Balanchine to traditional British tunes, hornpipe melodies and music-hall songs, ca. 1890–1914, adapted by Hershy Kay. The premiere took place on 13 May 1976, at the New York State Theater, Lincoln Center, to honor British heritage in the United States its bicentennial with costumes by Rouben Ter-Arutunian, original lighting by Ronald Bates and current lighting by Mark Stanley. At the finale the ensemble spells out "God Save the Queen" in semaphore code and the Union Jack unfurls. Principal dancer Jock Soto included an excerpt from Union Jack in his farewell performance in June 2005.

== Music ==
The music includes Scottish military tattoos and folk-dance forms; a music-hall pas de deux for the costermonger Pearly King and Queen; hornpipes, sea songs, work chants and jigs.

=== selections ===
- "Keel Row"
- "Caledonian Hunt's Delight"
- "Regimental Drum Variations"
- "Amazing Grace"
- "A Hundred Pipers"
- "The Sunshine of Your Smile"
- the Scottish theme from Händel's Water Music

==== Costermonger pas de deux ====
- "Dance wi' My Daddy"
- "The Night the Floor Fell In"
- "Our Lodger's Such a Nice Young Man"
- "Following in Father's Footsteps"
- "A Tavern in the Town"

==== finale ====
- "Rule Britannia!"

== Original cast ==
- Sara Leland
- Kay Mazzo
- Karin von Aroldingen
- Suzanne Farrell
- Patricia McBride
- Helgi Tomasson
- Jacques d'Amboise
- Peter Martins
- Jean-Pierre Bonnefoux
- Victor Castelli
- Bart Cook

== Articles ==
- NY Times by Anna Kisselgoff, 13 May 1976
- Sunday NY Times by Clive Barnes, 23 May 1976
- NY Times by Gia Kourlas, 25 December 2005
- NY Times by Tobi Tobias, 12 February 2006

== Reviews ==
- NY Times by Clive Barnes, 14 May 1976
- NY Times by Jennifer Dunning, 10 January 1980
- NY Times by Jack Anderson, 21 June 2005
- NY Times by Alastair Macaulay, 30 June 2008
