= La Source (Balanchine) =

La Source is a ballet made on New York City Ballet by its founding balletmaster (and co-founder) George Balanchine. The premiere took place on November 23, 1968, at the New York State Theater, Lincoln Center.

Balanchine's had previously made a pas de deux to music from Léo Delibes' Sylvia in 1950; he expanded this into a divertissement in 1965. The final version uses music from Delibes' ballets La source and Sylvia and choreography from the earlier pas de deux and divertissement.

The ballet has remained in the New York City Ballet repertory into the 2020s.

== Critical reception ==
Longtime Newsweek critic Hubert Saal praised the work for departing from the traditional classical pas de deux and presenting something "substantial and meaningful."

Dance critic Clive Barnes, writing in The New York Times, related a mixed opinion of the work, at first calling the choreography "totally suitable" and "beguiling." A few months later, he wrote that "the results are never less than interesting, but never more than agreeable.... On the other hand, and this is the great advantage of having a master carpenter around, the piece is still extraordinarily craftsmanlike. Balanchine can always create something that works."

Newsday's Ron Eyer was negative in his assessment, deeming it "a testament to the sterility of most contemporary ballet choreography" and "totally lacking in individuality and profile."

When the ballet was revived in 1987, Jack Anderson of the Times called watching La Source "one of life's small pleasures," and after seeing a performance in 2023, Marina Harss wrote in Fjord Review that La Source is "like a delicious meal" in which "wit, lightness, and stylishness predominate."

== Original cast ==
- Violette Verdy
- John Prinz
