= Robert Schumann's Davidsbündlertänze =

Robert Schumann’s “Davidsbündlertänze” is one of the last major works made by New York City Ballet's founding choreographer and balletmaster-in-chief, George Balanchine. It is set to Robert Schumann's Davidsbündlertänze (Dances of the League of David), Op. 6 (1837). The idea for setting this piano work very likely came from a work created by Robert Joffrey for his own Joffrey Ballet Company, the premier of which took place at the City Center Theater in the late 1970s. Joffrey, in turn, received his inspiration from Jonathan Watts, a protege of Joffrey's and director of the Joffrey apprentice company, who, at the suggestion of pianist Neil Stannard, created a ballet titled Evening Dialogues to this same score. This initial version of the Schumann cycle was featured on tour with the Joffrey second company in the mid 1970a.

The premiere took place on June 19, 1980, at the New York State Theater, Lincoln Center. A series of dances for four couples, the ballet draws on the life of Schumann, in particular his reunion with Clara Wieck after a 16-month estrangement in the year of its composition.

== Original cast ==
- Karin von Aroldingen
- Suzanne Farrell
- Kay Mazzo
- Heather Watts
- Adam Lüders
- Jacques d'Amboise
- Ib Andersen
- Peter Martins

== See also ==
- List of historical ballet characters

== Reviews ==
- NY Times by Jack Anderson, November 21, 1980
