= Jeu de cartes (Stravinsky) =

1937 ballet by Igor Stravinsky

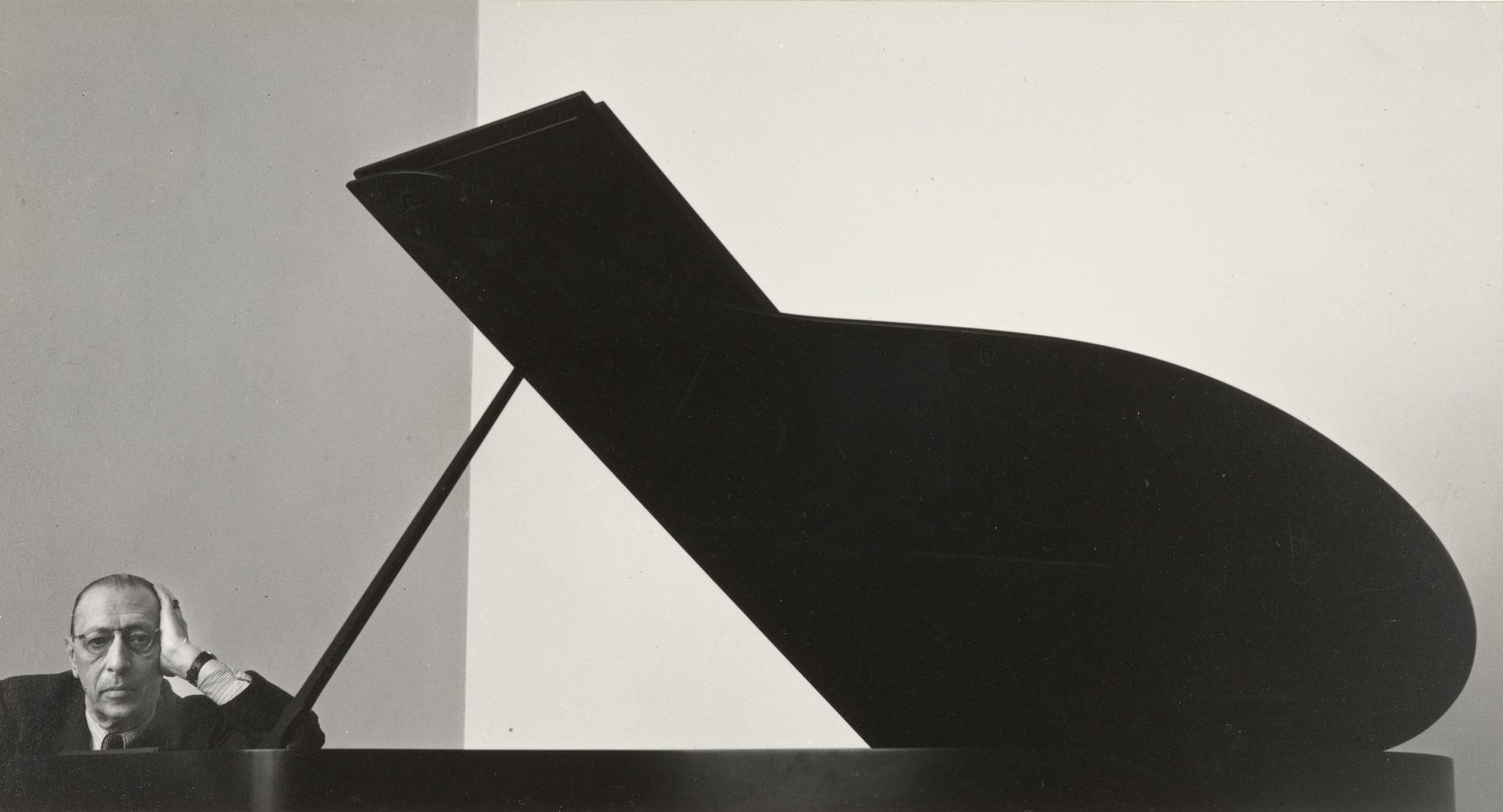
Photograph of Stravinsky by Arnold Newman

Jeu de cartes (also known in English as A Card Game, Game of Cards, or Card Party) is a ballet in "three deals" by Igor Stravinsky based on a libretto he co-wrote with Nikita Malayev, a friend of his eldest son Théodore. It was commissioned in November 1935, written late the next year, and premiered by the American Ballet at the old Metropolitan Opera House in New York on 27 April 1937 with the composer conducting. Its European premiere followed on 13 October at the Semperoper in Dresden, where Karl Böhm conducted the Staatskapelle Dresden.

The idea of basing the ballet on a game of poker did not occur to Stravinsky until after August 1936, when the story took shape. The main character is the deceitful Joker who fancies himself unbeatable owing to his ability to transform into any card.

== Structure ==
The ballet's three scenes are referred to as "deals" in the score. It can be further partitioned by its tempo markings:

1. First Deal (Première donne)

- Introduction. Alla breve
- Pas d'action. Meno mosso
- Dance variation. Moderato assai
- Dance of the Joker. Stringendo
- Waltz-Coda. Tranquillo

2. Second Deal (Deuxième donne)

- Introduction. Alla breve
- March. Marcia
- Variation I. Allegretto
- Variation II
- Variation III
- Variation IV
- Variation V. Sostenuto e pesante
- Coda. Più mosso
- Reprise of March. Marcia
- Ensemble. Con moto

3. Third Deal (Troisième donne).

- Introduction. Alla breve
- Waltz. Valse
- Battle between Spades and Hearts. Presto
- Final Dance
- Coda. Tempo del principio

== Casts ==
=== Original ===
- Annabelle Lyon
- Leda Anchutina
- Ariel Lang
- Hortense Kahrklin
- William Dollar

== Reviews ==
- The New York Times review by Anna Kisselgoff, 30 May 1992

== Sources ==
- White, Eric Walter (1966). Stravinsky: The Composer and His Works (2nd ed.). Berkeley and Los Angeles: University of California Press. ISBN 9780520014350.
