= Square Dance (ballet) =

Square Dance is a ballet made by New York City Ballet co-founder and balletmaster George Balanchine to Antonio Vivaldi's Concerto Grosso in B minor and the first movement of his Concerto Grosso in E major, Op. 3, nos. 10 and 12, respectively; in 1976 he added Arcangelo Corelli's Sarabanda, Badinerie e Giga, second and third movements. The premiere took place on November 21, 1957, at City Center of Music and Drama, New York, with lighting by Nananne Porcher. The original version placed the musicians on stage with a square dance caller calling the steps; from its 1976 revival the caller was eliminated, the orchestra placed in the pit, and a solo added for the premier danseur to the Corelli Sarabanda. The Pacific Northwest Ballet restored the caller for one performance at the 2007 Vail International Dance Festival.

== Original cast ==
- Patricia Wilde
- Nicholas Magallanes

== Reviews ==
- NY Times by John Martin, November 22, 1957
- NY Times by Anna Kisselgoff, May 22, 1976
- NY Times by Jack Anderson, October 13, 1984
- Ballet Dance review by Jeff Kuo, April 3, 2004
- Seattle Times Archived 2009-11-03 at the Wayback Machineby Moira Macdonald, September 22, 2007
- NY Times by Alastair Macaulay, September 25, 2007
- NY Times by Alastair Macaulay, April 1, 2008
- NY Times by Alastair Macaulay, June 30, 2008
