= Monumentum pro Gesualdo =

1960 arrangements by Igor Stravinsky of music by Carlo Gesualdo

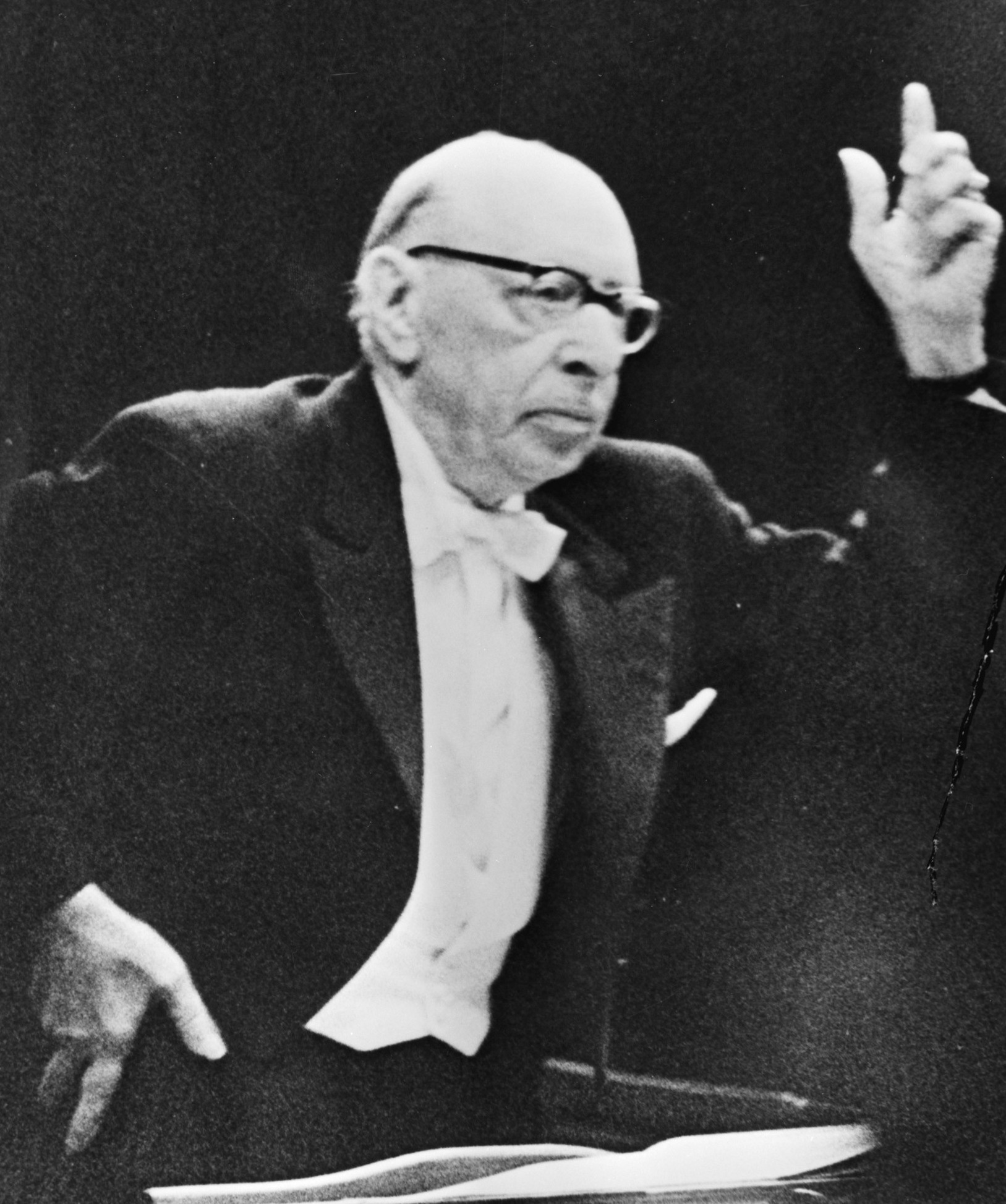
Igor Stravinsky in 1965

Monumentum pro Gesualdo is a 1960 arrangement and recomposition by Igor Stravinsky of three madrigals by Carlo Gesualdo:

1. Asciugate i begli occhi (Book 5, XIV)
2. Ma tu, cagion di quella (Book 5, XVIII)
3. Beltà poi che t'assenti (Book 6, II)

It was composed to commemorate the 400th anniversary of Gesualdo's birth and was intended to complement Stravinsky's similar Tres Sacrae Cantiones. It was premiered on September 27, 1960, at the Venice Biennale, played by the Orchestra del Teatro la Fenice conducted by Stravinsky.

The piece was later choreographed by the New York City Ballet (NYCB) co-founder and balletmaster George Balanchine. The premiere took place on Wednesday, November 16, 1960, at City Center of Music and Drama, New York, with scenery and lighting by David Hays (new lighting by Ronald Bates in 1974; current production's lighting by Mark Stanley).

It was first performed in conjunction with Balanchine's choreographic interpretation of Movements for Piano and Orchestra in 1963 and was regularly performed in this pairing thereafter.
