= Richard Buckle =

British ballet critic (1916–2001)

Richard Buckle CBE
- Born: 6 August 1916; Warcop, Westmorland, England
- Died: 12 October 2001 (aged 85); Salisbury, England
- Occupations: Ballet critic; author; editor; playwright

(Christopher) Richard Sandford Buckle CBE (6 August 1916 – 12 October 2001), was a lifelong English devotee of ballet, and a well-known ballet critic. He founded the magazine Ballet in 1939.

== Early life ==
Buckle was the only son of Lieutenant-Colonel Christopher Galbraith Buckle, DSO, MC, of the Northamptonshire Regiment, and his wife Rose, daughter of Francis Marmaduke Henry Sandford (descended from the Dukes of Portland and Barons Brooke) and his wife Constance Georgina (née Craven), great-granddaughter of the soldier William Craven, 1st Earl of Craven and maternal granddaughter of the naval commander and politician Charles Philip Yorke, 4th Earl of Hardwicke. They lived at the Old Cottage, Warcop, Cumberland.

The Buckle family consisted of minor gentry descended from Sir Cuthbert Buckle, Lord Mayor of London in 1593–1594. Buckle's uncle (married to his father's sister) was the clergyman Eric Graham. His father was killed in 1918 – Buckle was raised (and doted upon) by his mother and a number of female relations, including his paternal grandmother, Lily Buckle of Eden Gate, Warcop. Though raised in "genteel poverty", Buckle was interested in his extensive network of relations (some of them high aristocracy) and formed some close relationships with them. He contributed some genealogy to U and Non-U Revisited in 1978. He was educated at Marlborough College, then went to Balliol College, Oxford, to read modern languages, where he failed to obtain a scholarship and left after a year. He then attended the Heatherley School of Fine Art in London for a short time, having developed an interest in ballet, to which he dedicated himself, although his family had hoped he would pursue a stable career in banking – or even in the stage design he had studied.

== Career ==
Buckle founded the magazine Ballet in 1939 just at the outbreak of war. He published the first issue, indicating at the end that it would resume ‘after the war’, which it was. During the war Buckle served with the Scots Guards and was mentioned in despatches in 1944 during the Italy campaign. Between 1948 and 1955 he was ballet critic for The Observer. He organised a number of successful exhibitions, notably one in 1954 on the life and work of Diaghilev, first at the Edinburgh Festival and then at Forbes House in London, and the quatercentenary Shakespeare exhibition at Stratford-upon-Avon in 1964–1965. His publications include comprehensive biographies of Nijinsky (1971) and Diaghilev (1979). He edited several books, including the autobiography of Lydia Sokolova and the selected diaries of Cecil Beaton. Richard Buckle was appointed CBE in 1979.

== Later life ==
Having begun to suffer from poor health (yet producing some of his best work – the biographies of Nijinsky and Diaghilev – during this period), Buckle left London in 1976 and settled in Wiltshire in an isolated cottage, made more so by the fact that he did not drive. After recovering from a heart attack in 1979, he concentrated on his autobiographical works. He regularly visited his home village of Warcop, Cumbria, in the 1980s, sharing his recollections of the place fifty years earlier.

== Controversy ==
Buckle was several times accused of over-aggressive and insensitive reviewing, most notably in his criticism of Constant Lambert's final ballet Tiresias in 1951. His Observer review, entitled 'Three Blind Mice' (referring to Lambert, Frederick Ashton and Ninette De Valois), cast aspersions on the entire artistic leadership of the Royal Ballet company. Lambert died six weeks after its premiere. De Valois later retaliated: “When I am struck blind again, may it be in such equally worthy company.”

== Selected writings ==
- John Innocent at Oxford, Chatto & Windus (1939)
- Ballet, Ballet Publications Ltd (magazine 1939–1952)
- Katherine Dunham: her dancers, singers and musicians, Ballet Publications (1949)
- The Adventures of a Ballet Critic, Cresset Press (1953)
- Epstein: An Autobiography by Richard Buckle, Art Treasures Book Club (1955)
- In Search of Daighilev, Sidgwick & Jackson (1955)
- Modern Ballet Design, Macmillan (1955)
- The Prettiest Girl in England: the love story of Mrs Fitzherbert's Niece, John Murray (1958)
- Dancing for Diaghilev: The Memoirs of Lydia Sokolova, John Murray (1960); editor
- Harewood: a New Guide to the Yorkshire Seat of the Earls of Harewood, English Life Publications (1965)
- Nijinsky, Weidenfeld & Nicolson (1971), ISBN 0-297-00452-2
- U & Non-U Revisited, Debrett's Peerage (1978), ISBN 0-905649-17-6; editor
- Diaghilev, Weidenfeld & Nicolson (1979), ISBN 0-297-77506-5
- Buckle at the Ballet: Selected Criticism, Dance Books (1980), ISBN 0-903102-53-6; reviewed in The New York Times, 21 August 1981
- The Most Upsetting Woman (Autobiography 1), Collins (1981), ISBN 0-00-216326-8
- In the Wake of Diaghilev (Autobiography 2), Collins (1982), ISBN 0-00-216544-9
- George Balanchine: Ballet Master (with John Taras), Hamish Hamilton (1988), ISBN 0-241-12180-9
