= Suzanne Farrell Ballet =

- Founded: 2000
- Headquarters: Washington D.C., United States

The Suzanne Farrell Ballet is a ballet company housed at the Kennedy Center, Washington, D.C., and founded in 2000 by Suzanne Farrell, one of George Balanchine's most celebrated ballerinas, and a former New York City Ballet principal dancer. Until 2017, the Suzanne Farrell Ballet was a full-fledged company produced by the Kennedy Center and had performed there since 1999 in addition to presenting extensive national and international tours. In September 2016, the Center announced that the company would be disbanding at the end of 2017, citing "possibilities of new expansion" and indicating that Farrell would likely return to "full-time teaching."

== 1993–95 ==
In 1993 and 1994, the Kennedy Center offered two series of ballet master classes for students with Farrell. In 1995, the Center expanded the program to a national level. This three weeks long yearly initiative of intense study grew into a full-fledged program, Exploring Ballet with Suzanne Farrell. Students from the Exploring Ballet program have started to join the ranks of the Suzanne Farrell Ballet.

== 1999 ==
The company made its debut in the fall of 1999 during the Kennedy Center's Balanchine Celebration, performing Divertimento No. 15. Later, in the fall of 1999, Ms. Farrell received critical acclaim for the successful Kennedy Center engagement and East Coast tour of Suzanne Farrell Stages the Masters of 20th Century Ballet. Following the Kennedy Center's debut, the newly named Suzanne Farrell Ballet, a group of professional dancers hand selected by Ms. Farrell,.

== 2001–02 ==
The Suzanne Farrell Ballet opened the Kennedy Center's ballet season in the fall of 2001 with nearly two weeks of performances in the Eisenhower Theater – featuring no less than six company premieres. The company was again seen at the Kennedy Center in the fall of 2002, performing, among other works, company premieres of Balanchine's Chaconne, Raymonda Variations, Who Cares?, and Canadian choreographer Anthony Morgan's A Farewell to Music.

== 2003–04 ==
Following an extensive Fall 2003 U.S. tour that, for the first time, took them to the West Coast, the company opened the Kennedy Center's 2003–2004 ballet season with a full week of performances in the Eisenhower Theater. The week included performances of Mozartiana, Serenade, Tchaikovsky's Pas de Deux and Tempo di Vals from George Balanchine's The Nutcracker, as part of the 2003 Kennedy Center Tchaikovsky Festival, plus The Balanchine Couple. In June 2005 the company collaborated with the National Ballet of Canada to present the first staging of Balanchine's Don Quixote in more than 25 years. The evening-length ballet was created by George Balanchine specifically for Suzanne Farrell.

== 2005–06 ==
The Suzanne Farrell Ballet kicked off the 2005–2006 ballet season at the Kennedy Center with an all Balanchine program featuring Duo Concertant, La Source, La Valse and the Contrapuntal Blues pas de deux from Clarinade. In the summer of 2006 the company performed at Jacob's Pillow Dance Festival as well as at the Edinburgh International Festival with the European premiere of Balanchine's Don Quixote.

== 2007 ==
The company returned to the Kennedy Center Opera House in June 2007 with two programs, which included Balanchine's Scotch Symphony (Mendelssohn), Slaughter on Tenth Avenue (Rodgers, orch. Kay), and Mozartiana (Tchaikovsky), and Béjart's Scène d'amour from Romeo and Juliet (Berlioz), as well as the Washington, D.C. premieres of two newly re-staged works which had not been seen in forty years: Balanchine's Divertimento Brillante (Glinka) and the Adagio from Concierto de Mozart (Balanchine).

Committed to carrying forth the legacy of George Balanchine through performances of his classic ballets, the company announced the formal creation of the Balanchine Preservation Initiative in February 2007. This initiative served to introduce rarely seen or "lost" Balanchine works to audiences around the world. Many of these works had not been performed in nearly forty years. The Initiative was produced with the knowledge and cooperation of The George Balanchine Trust. The company's repertoire included ten Balanchine Preservation Initiative Ballets.

In November 2007, the company launched an Artistic Partnership outreach program. Farrell brought together her company and Cincinnati Ballet, a company from her hometown, to present Chaconne. In 2008, the company selected Ballet Austin as an artistic partner and presented Episodes. In 2011, the company partnered with The Sarasota Ballet to present Diamonds in Washington, DC (Oct 2011)], Sarasota, FL (Nov 2011), and Clearwater, FL (Nov 2011). The mission of this initiative was to support ballet companies throughout the United States.

== 2010 ==
In June 2010, the Company traveled to Sofia, Bulgaria, to perform Agon in a shared evening with the National Ballet of Bulgaria in a program titled "Balanchine and Farrell: American Ballet for Bulgaria" presented by Cultural Bridges Association. This trip marked the Company's second international appearance.

== 2011 ==
In October 2011, The Suzanne Farrell Ballet celebrated 10 years of annual engagements at the Kennedy Center. As a part of the anniversary celebration the Company traveled to New York City for a week of performances at The Joyce Theater followed by touring to The Lied Center of Kansas, the Van Wezel Performing Arts Hall in Sarasota Florida with The Sarasota Ballet, the Ruth Eckerd Hall in Clearwater Florida with The Sarasota Ballet followed by a spring tour that started with a Florida State University Residency with performances at the Seven Days of Opening Nights Festival, the Van Wezel Performing Arts Hall in Burlington Vermont, and the Lyndon Institute Auditorium in Lyndon Vermont.

== 2012/13 ==
For the 2012 – 2013 season The Suzanne Farrell Ballet began with an October residency at Florida State University followed by performances at the VelocityDC Dance Festival in Washington DC and at the Millennium Stage at the Kennedy Center in Washington DC. In November they performed at the Career Transitions for Dancers Gala in New York and produced their fall season at the Kennedy Center’s Eisenhower Theater. In February the company traveled to the Royal Opera House in Muscat Oman marking their third international appearance.

== 2013/2014 ==
The company started the 13-14 season with a residency at Florida State University in September followed by performances at the Millennium Stage and the Eisenhower Theater at the Kennedy Center in October and November respectively.

== 2014/2015 ==
In October 2014 the company began the season at Florida State University continuing their residency program before heading to Washington DC for their annual fall season at the Kennedy Center. This time on the Opera House Stage the company performed three Balanchine works (1951 version of Swan Lake, Allegro Brillante, Monumentum & Movements) and Robbins's The Concert (Or, The Perils of Everybody) before heading to the University of Minnesota in Minneapolis and Purchase College in New York. In February the company traveled to the Lied Center for Performing Arts in Lincoln Nebraska before heading to ZiL Cultural Center in Moscow Russia in an Artistic Partnership with Theatre Ballet Moscow marking the company’s fourth international appearance.

== 2016/2017 ==
In September 2016, the Kennedy Center announced that the company would be disbanding at the end of its 2017 performance season, citing "possibilities of new expansion" and indicating that Farrell would likely return to "full-time teaching." While there was no mention of forming a new company or what exactly Farrell's new position at the Center would entail, Kennedy Center President Deborah Rutter noted that the Center would be undergoing a new expansion project to be completed in spring 2018, which would include new performance and rehearsal space.

== Balanchine Preservation Initiative Ballets ==
All choreography by George Balanchine

Ballade (1980) Company Premiere: November 23, 2007. Music by Gabriel Faure

Adagio from Concierto de Mozart (1942) Company Premiere: June 6, 2007. Music by Wolfgang Amadeus Mozart

Contrapuntal Blues pas de deux from Clarinade (1964) Company Premiere: November 22, 2005. Music by Morton Gould

Danses Concertantes (1972) Company Premiere: November 7, 2012 Music by Igor Stravinsky

Divertimento Brillante (1967) (from Balanchine’s Glinkiana) Company Premiere: June 8, 2007. Music by Mikhail Ivanovich Glinka

Balanchine's Don Quixote (1965) Company Premiere: June 22, 2005 (Pas de Deux Mauresque premiered December 5, 2003). Music by Nicolas Nabokov

Haieff Divertimento (1947) Company Premiere: March 3, 2010. Music by Alexei Haieff

Pithoprakta (1968) Company Premiere: November 23, 2007. Music by Iannis Xenakis

Ragtime (1966) Company Premiere: October 8, 2008. Music by Igor Stravinsky

Variations for Orchestra (1982) Company Premiere: February 16, 2001. Music by Igor Stravinsky
