= Ronald Bates =

American lighting designer and stage manager (1932–1986)

Ronald Bates (July 14, 1932 – August 25, 1986) was an American ballet lighting designer, particularly for the New York City Ballet.

== Early life and career ==
Bates was born in Fort Smith, Arkansas in 1932. He studied scenic design at Los Angeles City College after serving in the Navy. He worked as a stage manager while still in college and after two years of doing so in California, came to New York and worked in that capacity on opera productions for Lincoln Kirstein, City Ballet's co-founder.

Bates began working for New York City Ballet in 1957 as a production stage manager.

After working at the Stratford, Connecticut Mozart and Shakespeare Festivals, and for the NBC Opera Company in New York City, he joined NYCB at Kirstein's invitation and remained as production stage manager for over 20 years. His duties included planning and executing the technical aspects of staging the ballets at the New York State Theater, of which he was also technical director. He also was in charge of the transportation of lights and scenery for the production of ballets at the company's summer home in Saratoga Springs and on tour, both stateside and overseas.

Bates was resident lighting designer for City Ballet and a close collaborator with founding balletmaster (and co-founder) George Balanchine and co-founding balletmaster Jerome Robbins. He was an authority on dance floors and stage floor construction and renovated the Palm Beach Auditorium for the Palm Beach Festival. He travelled internationally to direct technical production and reproduce his lighting designs for NYCB productions staged by other companies, especially at the Zurich Ballet, where former NYCB principal dancer Patricia Neary was artistic director.

Along with Balanchine and Perry Silvey, Bates developed the "Balanchine basket-weave floor," which helped reduce injuries for dancers.

== Personal life ==
Bates was married to Diana Adams, who was once a principal dancer with the New York City Ballet. Their marriage ended in divorce. They had a daughter, Georgina.

== Death ==
Bates died of a heart attack in his Manhattan home on August 25, 1986, at the age of 54.
