= Yvonne Borree =

American ballet dancer

Yvonne Borree is a former principal dancer at New York City Ballet. She was raised in Norfolk, Virginia, where she began her dance studies with the Tidewater Ballet Association at four years of age.

She attended the School of American Ballet for three summers and was invited to enter SAB full-time in 1985. Two years later Yvonne became an apprentice with SAB's parent company, New York City Ballet, and joined the corps de ballet in 1988. she danced with guest artist Mikhail Baryshnikov in George Balanchine's "Duo Concertant" in Spring, 1992.

Ms. Borree was promoted to the rank of soloist the next year and to principal in 1997. She is the daughter of Susan Borree, who danced with Jerome Robbins' Ballets: USA, with New York City Ballet and American Ballet Theatre. Yvonne Borree's farewell performance took place Sunday, June 6, 2010, and consisted of ballets by Christopher Wheeldon and George Balanchine:

- Estancia
- Duo Concertant
- Brahms–Schoenberg Quartet

== Originated rôles ==
=== Robert La Fosse ===
- Danses De Cour

=== Miriam Mahdaviani ===
- Correlazione

=== Peter Martins ===
- Ash
- The Chairman Dances
- Delight of the Muses
- Fearful Symmetries
- Jazz, or Six Syncopated Movements
- Quartet for Strings
- Sinfonia
- The Sleeping Beauty The White Cat in Puss In Boots
- Slonimsky's Earbox
- Stabat Mater
- Thou Swell

=== Christopher Wheeldon ===
- Carnival of the Animals

== Featured rôles ==
=== George Balanchine ===
- Apollo
- Coppélia (Swanilda)
- Divertimento No. 15
- Donizetti Variations
- Duo Concertant
- The Four Temperaments
- The Nutcracker Sugarplum Fairy and Dewdrop
- Harlequinade Colombine
- Raymonda Variations
- Scotch Symphony
- La Sonnambula
- Square Dance
- The Steadfast Tin Soldier
- Stravinsky Violin Concerto
- Symphony in C
- Symphony in Three Movements
- Tschaikovsky Pas de Deux
- Union Jack
- Western Symphony

=== Sean Lavery ===
- Romeo and Juliet

=== Peter Martins ===
- A Fool for You
- The Sleeping Beauty Princess Aurora
- Swan Lake

=== Kevin O'Day ===
- Dvorak Bagatelles
- Badchonim, or Merry-Makers

=== Jerome Robbins ===
- The Concert
- Dances at a Gathering
- The Four Seasons
- The Goldberg Variations
- In the Night
- Mother Goose

=== Christopher Wheeldon ===
- Mercurial Manoeuvres

== Television ==
- Dance in America, George Balanchine's Western Symphony
- PBS Live from Lincoln Center, New York City Ballet's Diamond Project: Ten Years of New Choreography, 2002, Peter Martins' Them Twos
