= Rachel Rutherford =

Rachel Rutherford (born Rachel Rutherford Englund Knapp) is a former soloist with New York City Ballet.

Rutherford was born in New York City, the daughter of dancer and ballet teacher Gage Bush Englund. She began her training at age eight at the Joffrey Ballet School and entered the School of American Ballet in 1987. While attending the Chapin School, from which she eventually graduated in 1994, Rutherford also received the D.A.N.C.E. scholarship allowing her to study in Spring 1992 at the Royal Danish Ballet. She became an apprentice with the New York City Ballet the following year and joined the corps de ballet late 1995. The next Spring she appeared on the Late Show with David Letterman.

Ms. Rutherford was promoted to soloist at the New York City Ballet in May 2002, danced that year in Chiaroscuro on the Live from Lincoln Center broadcast, New York City Ballet's Diamond Project: Ten Years of New Choreography, and again two years later dancing in Concerto Barocco on their Lincoln Center Celebrates Balanchine 100, both on PBS. She retired in 2011.

== Roles ==
=== originated featured roles ===
==== Stephen Baynes ====
- Twilight Courante

==== Miriam Mahdaviani ====
- Appalachia Waltz
- Urban Dances

==== Angelin Preljocaj ====
- La Stravaganza

==== Jerome Robbins ====
- NY Export: Opus Jazz, NYCB premiere

==== Christopher Wheeldon ====
- Carnival of the Animals
- Carousel (A Dance)
- Slavonic Dances

=== originated corps roles ===
==== Eliot Feld ====
- Organon

==== Robert La Fosse and Robert Garland ====
- Tributary

==== Peter Martins ====
- Concerti Armonici
- Reliquary

==== Jerome Robbins ====
- Brandenburg
- West Side Story Suite

=== featured roles ===
==== George Balanchine ====
- Apollo
- Ballo della Regina
- Chaconne
- Concerto Barocco
- Divertimento No. 15
- The Firebird
- The Four Temperaments
- The Nutcracker
- Jewels (Emeralds)
- Liebeslieder Walzer
- A Midsummer Night's Dream
- Tschaikovsky Suite No. 3
- La Valse
- Western Symphony
- Who Cares?

==== August Bournonville ====
- Pas de Six

==== Miriam Mahdaviani ====
- Correlazione

==== Peter Martins ====
- The Sleeping Beauty
- Stabat Mater
- Swan Lake
- Thou Swell

==== Alexei Ratmansky ====
- Russian Seasons

==== Jerome Robbins ====
- Antique Epigraphs
- Dances at a Gathering
- Dybbuk
- Fancy Free
- Fanfare
- The Four Seasons
- Glass Pieces
- The Goldberg Variations
- Interplay
- In the Night

==== Lynne Taylor-Corbett ====
- Chiaroscuro
