= Wilhelmina Frankfurt =

American ballerina

- Education: School of American Ballet
- Occupations: dancer, choreographer
- Dancing career
- Former groups: New York City Ballet

Wilhelmina Frankfurt is an American ballerina, dance educator, and choreographer. She was a soloist with the New York City Ballet, dancing under the direction of George Balanchine, Jerome Robbins, and Peter Martins, until she left the company in 1985. Throughout her career, she performed in various Balanchine ballets including Agon, Le Tombeau de Couperin, Chaconne, Symphony in Three Movements, The Nutcracker, and Jewels. She was a founding member of the Lincoln Center's Arts and Education program and served as an artist in residence at Sarah Lawrence College, Vassar College, and The Masters School. In 2012, Frankfurt alleged that Peter Martins sexually assaulted her while she was a dancer at New York City Ballet. In 2022, she assumed the position of artistic director at the Stapleton School of the Performing arts succeeding Virginia Stapleton, the company’s founder.

== Career ==
=== Dancing ===
Frankfurt was awarded a grant from the Ford Foundation to study at the School of American Ballet in New York City. While a student at the school, she was selected by George Balanchine to join the New York City Ballet. Frankfurt was a dancer with the New York City Ballet, under the direction of Balanchine and, later, Jerome Robbins, for fourteen years. She was later promoted to the rank of soloist. Frankfurt danced in ballets including Agon, Symphony in Three Movements, Chaconne, Le Tombeau de Couperin, and The Nutcracker. In 1974, she danced in a ballet choreographed by John Clifford to Béla Bartók's Piano Concerto No. 3 with Debra Austin, Muriel Aasen, Sara Leland, and Anthony Blum. In 1981, Frankfurt danced Rubies in Jewels. She also performed in the Dance in America television series for PBS.

Frankfurt left New York City Ballet in 1985.

=== Dance education ===
While a member of the company, Frankfurt was installed as an artist in residence at Lincoln Center, where she gave educational lectures at the Metropolitan Opera House as part of the center's Meet-the-Artist series. She was a founding member of the Lincoln Center Arts and Education program, through which she taught and gave lectures about dance in the New York City Public School System.

She was an artist in residence at Sarah Lawrence College, Vassar College, and The Masters School.

Frankfurt was the choreographer and artistic advisor for the Ulster Ballet Company and served as the artistic director and choreographer in residence for Catskill Ballet Theater. Later, she served as the artistic director for The 8th Position Dance Pod. In 2022, she became the artistic director at the Stapleton School of the Performing Arts.

== Allegations against Peter Martins ==
During an interview with Psychology Tomorrow in 2012, Frankfurt alleged that she had experienced sexual misconduct at New York City Ballet by both Peter Martins and Balanchine. In October 2017, she began working with Sarah Kaufman of The Washington Post on a story about Martins, the former ballet director after the School of American Ballet began investigating him for anonymous accusations of sexual assault and misconduct. In a 2017 interview with Dance Magazine, Frankfurt stated: "Am I a victim of Martins abuse? Yes. Was it sexual? Yes. Was it consensual? No." In an interview with Salon Magazine, Frankfurt alleged that Martins pulled her "into his dressing room and exposed himself" during one of her performances.
