= Le Tombeau de Couperin (ballet) =

Ballet by George Balanchine

- Choreographer: George Balanchine
- Music: Maurice Ravel
- Premiere: May 29, 1975; New York State Theater
- Original ballet company: New York City Ballet
- Design: Ronald Bates
- Genre: Neoclassical ballet

Le Tombeau de Couperin is a ballet choreographed by George Balanchine to Ravel's eponymous suite. It features a cast of sixteen divided into two groups, dancing separately. The score, which references 18th-century dances, was first choreographed by the Ballets suédois in the 1920s. Balanchine's version of Le Tombeau de Couperin was made for the New York City Ballet's Ravel Festival, celebrating the composer's centenary, and premiered on May 29, 1975, at the New York State Theater.

== Choreography ==
Le Tombeau de Couperin features eight couples divided into two groups, called quadrilles, that dances separately. There are no principal roles in the ballet. Balanchine wrote that the ballet "doesn't say anything beyond the combination of these dancers moving to Ravel's lovely score." Dance critic Richard Buckle described, "The mood is both pastoral and elegiac." Author Nancy Reynolds found that the ballet "did not observe the overtones of lament" in the score, but "retained the aura of formal dances" through the use of couples and geometric formations.

== Production ==
Balanchine decided that for French composer Maurice Ravel's centenary in 1975, the New York City Ballet would hold the Ravel Festival to honor him. In the previous forty years, Balanchine had only made two ballets to Ravel's works. However, he stated he always enjoyed his music and decided "it would be a good idea to celebrate this wonderful composer’s life and work by arranging new dances to as many scores as we could." He decided to choreograph to Le Tombeau de Couperin, an orchestral score that was a tribute to both François Couperin and French music in general.

Balanchine uncharacteristically completed the ballet early on in the rehearsal period, then moved on to work on other ballets. Fearing the choreography would be forgotten before the ballet's premiere, ballet master Rosemary Dunleavy gathered the cast and "got it back together again." Balanchine kept delaying his participation in these rehearsals despite Dunleavy's persuation. When he finally went to a rehearsal, it was also the first time he watched the ballet from the beginning to end. The dancers are dressed in practice clothes. The lighting of the ballet is designed by Ronald Bates.

Following Balanchine's death, Dunleavy inherited the rights to the ballet.

== Original cast ==
Left Quadrille

- Judith Fugate
- Jean-Pierre Frohlich
- Wilhelmina Frankfurt
- Victor Castelli
- Muriel Aasen
- Francis Sackett
- Susan Hendl
- David Richardson

Right Quadrille

- Marjorie Spohn
- Hermes Condé
- Delia Peters
- Richard Hoskinson
- Susan Pilarre
- Richard Dryden
- Carol Sumner
- Laurence Matthews

== Performances ==
Le Tombeau de Couperin premiered on May 29, 1975, at the New York State Theater, on the third program of the Ravel Festival, conducted by Robert Irving. The School of American Ballet, affiliated with the New York City Ballet, had its students perform the ballet.

== Critical reception ==
Reviewing a performance months after the premiere, Clive Barnes of the New York Times wrote, "In Le Tombeau de Couperin he just uses the ensemble, but he uses it with such grace and sensibility that it is itself a star. The ballet looks so handsome and its movements are so extraordinarily well‐aligned and well‐attuned to the music that the entire work from beginning to end absolutely sings. It is one of those ballets that you watch with ever developing wonderment and pleasure, and it should, in the future, stand as a kind of signature for the City Ballet ensemble."
