= Chase Finlay =

American ballet dancer

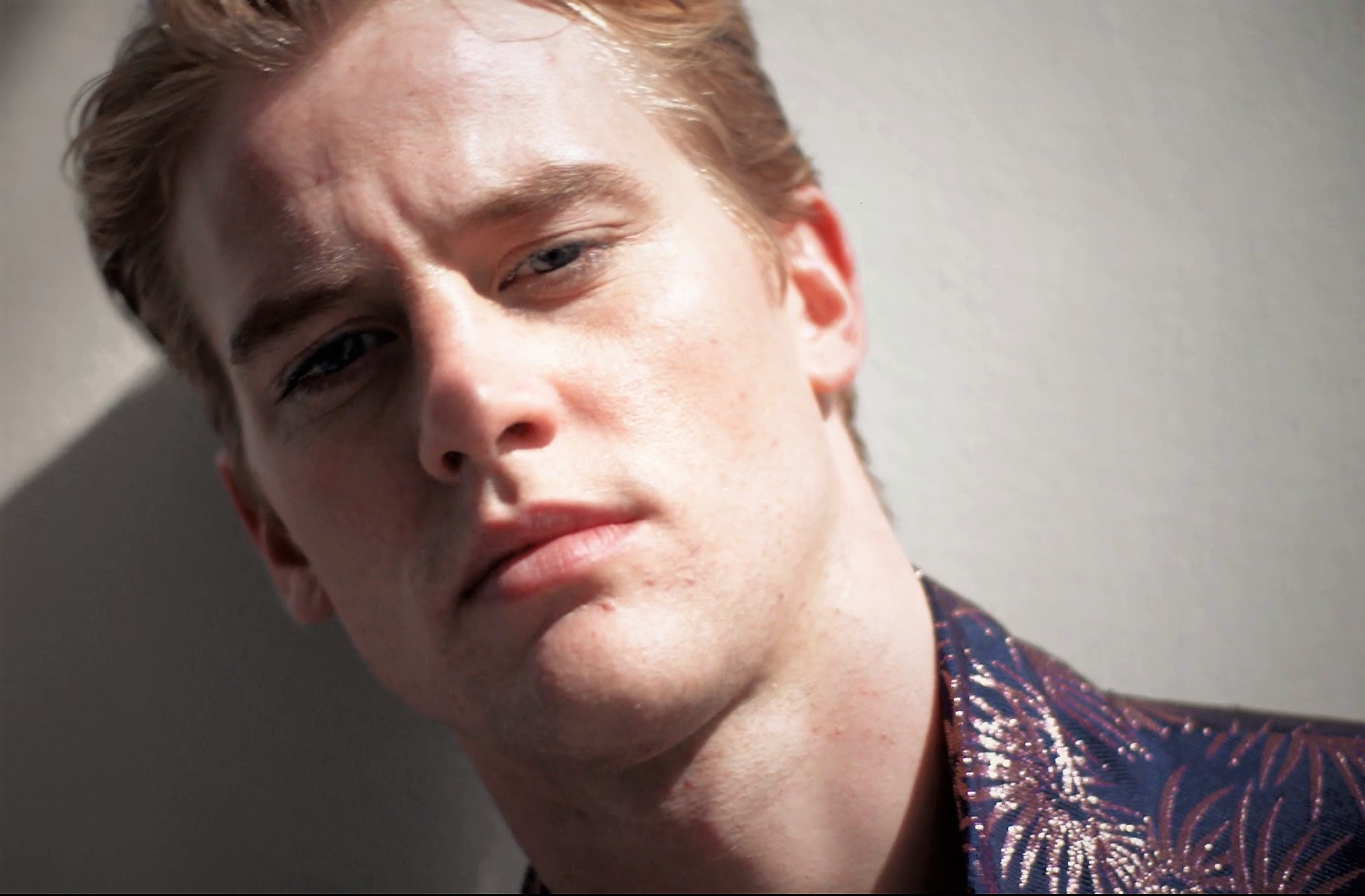
- Finlay in 2017
- Born: 1990 (age 35–36); Fairfield, Connecticut, U.S.
- Education: School of American Ballet
- Occupation: Ballet dancer
- Years active: 2008–2018
- Career
- Former groups: New York City Ballet

Chase Finlay (born 1990) is an American former ballet dancer. He was a principal dancer with the New York City Ballet and also danced with the Mariinsky Theatre.

== Early life ==
Born in Fairfield, Connecticut, Finlay began his dance training at the age of 8, at Ballet Academy East in New York City. During the summer of 2007, he began studying at the School of American Ballet, the official school of New York City Ballet (NYCB). He subsequently enrolled there as a full-time student.

== Career ==
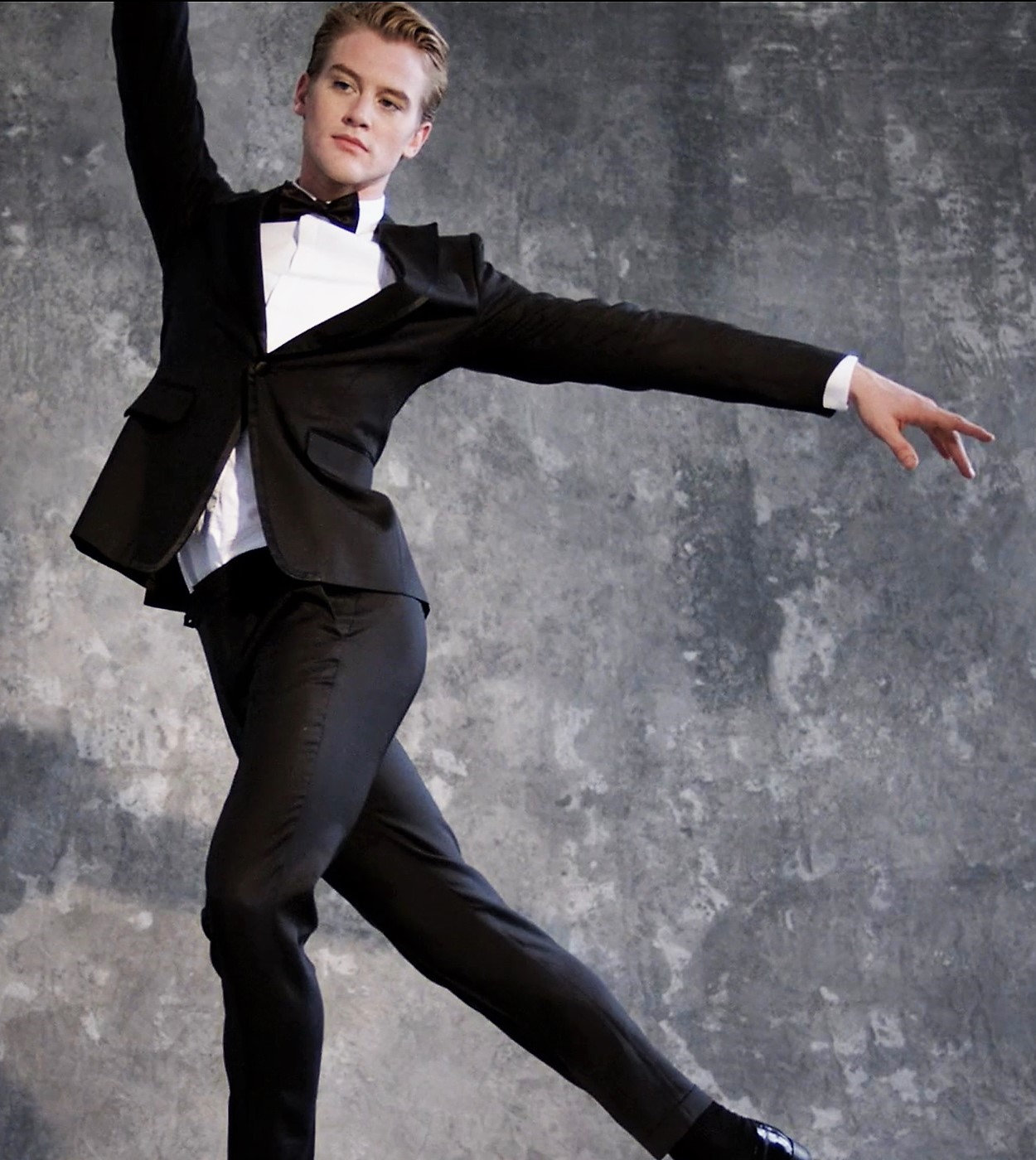
Finlay, dancing in evening dress, 2017

Finlay became an apprentice with NYCB in September 2008. He became a member of the corps de ballet in September 2009. While still a member of the corps de ballet, he danced the title role in George Balanchine's Apollo.

He was promoted to soloist in July 2011, and to principal in February 2013.

== Alexandra Waterbury lawsuit ==
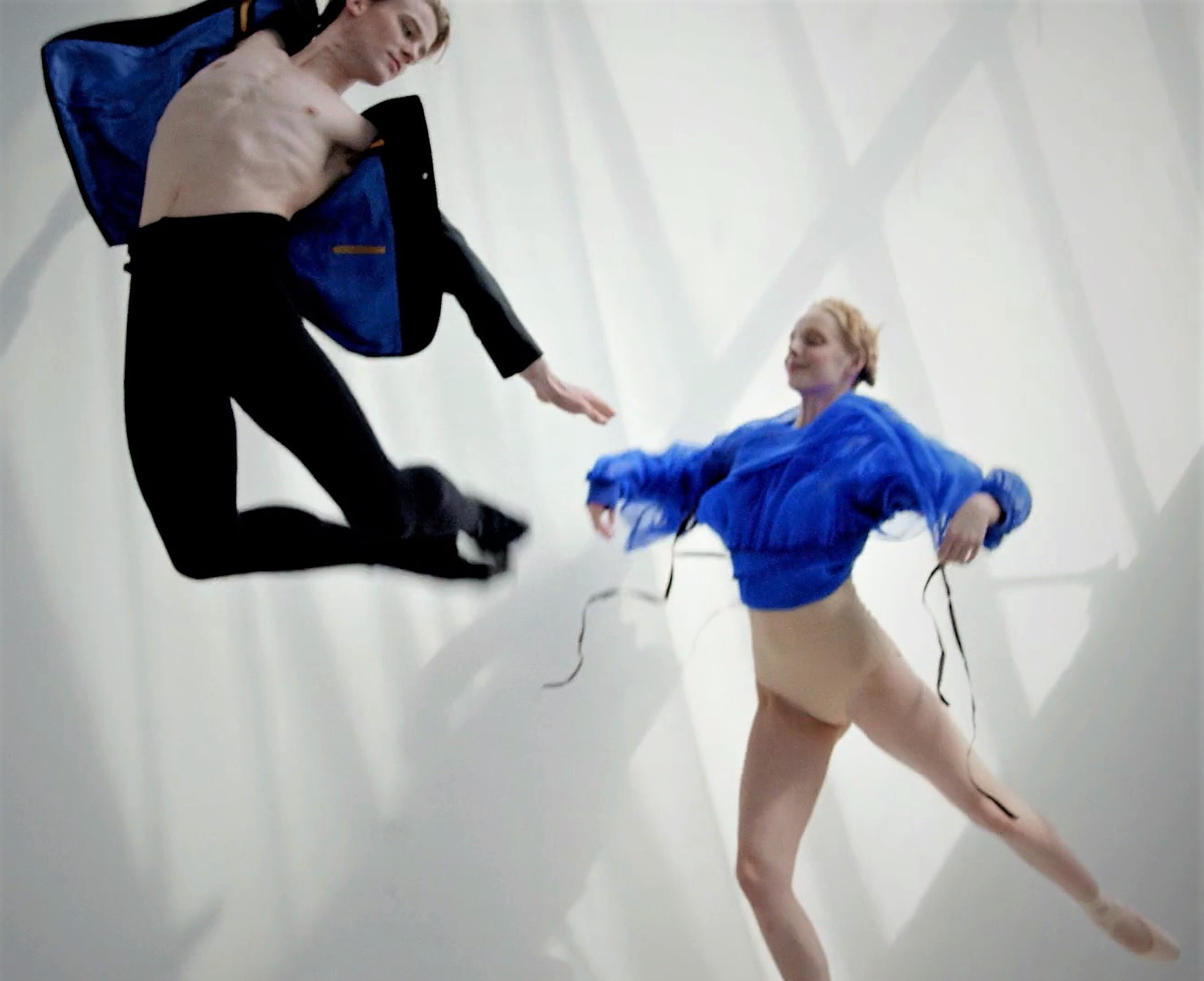
Finlay with Alexandra Waterbury, 2017

In September 2018, Finlay was sued by his 20-year-old ex-girlfriend, Alexandra Waterbury, for allegedly sharing nude photos of her and other female dancers with male company members without their consent. Finlay resigned from the New York City Ballet in August 2018 during the company's investigation.

== Roles ==
Featured roles since joining the New York City Ballet:

George Balanchine

- Apollo
- Brahms-Schoenberg Quartet (First Movement)
- Divertimento No. 15
- Duo Concertant
- Liebeslieder Walzer
- A Midsummer Night's Dream (Divertissement, Lysander)
- Mozartiana
- George Balanchine's The Nutcracker™ (Cavalier, Hot Chocolate)
- Robert Schumann's "Davidsbündlertänze"
- Stars and Stripes
- Symphony in C (First Movement)
- Tchaikovsky Pas de Deux

Ulysses Dove

- Red Angels

Sean Lavery

- Romeo and Juliet

Peter Martins

- Fearful Symmetries
- Morgen
- River of Light
- The Sleeping Beauty (Gold)
- Swan Lake (Pas de Quatre)
- Todo Buenos Aires

Jerome Robbins

- 2 & 3 Part Inventions
- Glass Pieces
- Interplay
- N.Y. Export: Opus Jazz
- West Side Story Suite

Christopher Wheeldon

- Polyphonia
- Soirée Musicale

Originated featured roles in

- Peter Martins: Bal de Couture, Mirage
- Angelin Preljocaj: Spectral Evidence

Originated corps roles in

- Alexey Miroshnichenko: The Lady with The Little Dog
- Alexei Ratmansky: Namouna, A Grand Divertissement
- Lynne Taylor-Corbett: The Seven Deadly Sins
- Christopher Wheeldon: Estancia

== Honors ==
In 2010, Finlay became the first recipient of the Clive Barnes Award for dance.
