= Divertimento No. 15 =

Divertimento No. 15 may refer to:

- Divertimento No. 15 (Mozart), a composition by Wolfgang Amadeus Mozart
- Divertimento No. 15 (ballet), a ballet by George Balanchine
