= Romeo and Juliet (Lavery) =

1991 ballet by Sean Lavery

- Choreographer: Sean Lavery
- Music: Sergei Prokofiev
- Premiere: 1965; New York State Theater, Lincoln Center
- Original ballet company: New York City Ballet
- Genre: Neoclassical ballet
- Type: Classical ballet

The balcony scene from Romeo and Juliet was staged by Sean Lavery, assistant to the ballet master in chief at New York City Ballet to Prokofiev's Romeo and Juliet (1934–1940). The premiere took place 24 February 1991 at the New York State Theater, Lincoln Center.

== Cast ==
The original cast consisted of Judith Fugate and Peter Boal.

=== NYCB revivals ===
Season	Romeo	Juliet
2005 Saratoga Springs	Peter Boal	Judith Fugate
2006 Winter	Sébastien Marcovici	Yvonne Borree
2006 Saratoga Springs	Tyler Angle	Kathryn Morgan
2007 School of American Ballet workshop	Russell Janzen	Callie Bachman
2009 Saratoga Springs – first cast	Tyler Angle	Yvonne Borree
2009 Saratoga Springs – first cast	Chase Finlay	Stephanie Zungre

== Reviews ==
- Ballet Magazine review by Eric Taub, August 2005
- Explore Dance review by Dr. Roberta E. Zlokower, 21 January 2006
- NY Times review by Alastair Macaulay, 6 June 2007
