= Megan Fairchild =

American ballet dancer

- Born: June 17, 1984 (age 41); Salt Lake City, Utah, U.S.
- Education: School of American Ballet
- Occupation: Ballet dancer
- Years active: 2001–present
- Spouse(s): Lin Corte Andrew Veyette (m. 2011; div. 2017)
- Children: 3
- Relatives: Robert Fairchild (brother)
- Career
- Current group: New York City Ballet
- Website: meganfairchild.com

Megan Fairchild (born June 17, 1984) is an American ballet dancer. She was a principal dancer with the New York City Ballet from 2005 until her farewell performance on May 24, 2026.

== Early life ==
Fairchild was born in Salt Lake City, Utah, and began her dance training at the age of four, studying with Judy Levitre and Kaelynne Oliphant at Dance Concepts in Sandy, Utah, and at the Ballet West Conservatory in Salt Lake City with Sharee Lane, Deborah Dobson, and Maureen Laird. While at the Ballet West Conservatory, Fairchild was also a Ballet West trainee. Fairchild entered the School of American Ballet (SAB), the official school of New York City Ballet, in the fall of 2000.

Her brother, Robert Fairchild was also a principal with the company. She and her brother are both recipients of the Mae L. Wien Award at the School of American Ballet.

== Career ==
In November 2001, Fairchild joined the New York City Ballet as an apprentice, and in October 2002 she joined the Company and became a member of the corps de ballet. Fairchild was promoted to the rank of soloist in February 2004, and in January 2005, she was promoted to principal dancer.

In 2011, she danced the role of Sugar Plum Fairy in a telecast of The Nutcracker.

Fairchild made her Broadway stage debut playing the role of Ivy Smith in the 2014 revival of On the Town, which opened on October 16, 2014, at the Lyric Theatre. She received the 2015 Theatre World Award for her performance. She is currently a Teaching Fellow with the School of American Ballet.

Fairchild defended Peter Martins, then Ballet Master in Chief of the New York City Ballet, when he was accused of physical and sexual abuse. She said she felt safe working with him.

== Selected repertoire ==
George Balanchine

- Apollo (Calliope)
- Ballo della Regina
- Coppélia (Swanilda)
- "Emeralds" and "Rubies" from Jewels
- The Nutcracker (Sugarplum Fairy, Dewdrop, Marzipan, Dolls)
- Harlequinade (Pierrette)
- A Midsummer Night's Dream (Butterfly, Divertissement)
- Raymonda Variations
- Serenade
- Symphony in C (First Movement, Third Movement)
- Tschaikovsky Pas de Deux
- Theme and Variations

August Bournonville

- La Sylphide (The Sylph)

Peter Martins

- The Sleeping Beauty (Aurora, Ruby, Princess Florine)
- Swan Lake (Odette/Odile, Pas de Trois, Pas de Quatre, Neapolitan)

Jerome Robbins

- Dances at a Gathering

=== Created roles ===
- Robert La Fosse: Land of Nod (Natalie)
- Peter Martins: Bal de Couture, Naïve and Sentimental Music
- Angelin Preljocaj: Spectral Evidence
- Alexei Ratmansky: Namouna, A Grand Divertissement, Voices
- Susan Stroman: "The Blue Necklace" from Double Feature (Florence)
- Christopher Wheeldon: Shambards

== Personal life ==
In 2011, Fairchild married fellow New York City Ballet principal Andrew Veyette, but they quietly divorced in 2015. She is the mother of three daughters, including a pair of twins with her second husband. She has a degree in mathematics and economics from Fordham University and an M.B.A. from New York University.

From 2014 to 2017, Fairchild was the sister-in-law of fellow dancer Tiler Peck, through Peck's marriage to Megan's brother Robert.

== Awards and nominations ==
Year	Award	Category	Work	Result
2001	Mae L. Wien Award	Outstanding Promise		Won
2015	Outer Critics Circle Award	Outstanding Featured Actress in a Musical	On The Town	Nominated
2015	Theatre World Award		On The Town	Won
2015	Astaire Award	Best Female Dancer	On The Town	Won
