= Carnival of the Animals (ballet) =

Ballet choreographed by Christopher Wheeldon

- Choreographer: Christopher Wheeldon
- Music: Camille Saint-Saëns
- Libretto: John Lithgow
- Premiere: May 14, 2003; New York State Theater
- Original ballet company: New York City Ballet
- Design: Jon Morrell; Natasha Katz
- Setting: American Museum of Natural History

Carnival of the Animals is a ballet choreographed by Christopher Wheeldon to the Le Carnaval Des Animaux by Saint-Saëns, with narrations written by John Lithgow, costumes and sets designs by Jon Morrell and lighting designed by Natasha Katz. It premiered on May 14, 2003, at the New York State Theater, performed by the New York City Ballet. The ballet is about a little boy who falls asleep at the American Museum of Natural History and dreams of people he knew as animals.

== Synopsis ==
Oliver Pendleton Percy III, a little boy, falls asleep during a visit to the American Museum of Natural History. In his dream, people he knows are transformed to animals, such as his great-aunt who is also a former ballerina as the swan, the librarian as a kangaroo who dreams of being a mermaid, his teacher as the lion, and his worried parents as cuckoos. The narrator appears as the school nurse who transforms into a female elephant.

== Production ==
Christopher Wheeldon and John Lithgow met in 2002 when the two worked on the musical Sweet Smell of Success as choreographer and actor respectively. After that, Wheeldon invited Lithgow, who is also an author, to write the narrations and perform in his ballet Carnival of the Animals. When the ballet premiered, Lithgow appeared as the narrator, school nurse and a female elephant. Jon Morrell designed the costumes and sets, and Natasha Katz designed the lighting.

The ballet is set in the American Museum of Natural History, which Wheeldon visits frequently due to its "amazing mix of the grotesque and the wonderful". Wheeldon had said that since the start of the creative process, it was determined that the performers are "people first, then animals", and he "wanted to move away from the clichéd bunny ears and fluffy tails", therefore the animal characteristics are only subtly implied.

Lithgow returned for the New York City Ballet's appearance at the Saratoga Performing Arts Center in July 2003, and at the 2005 revival, for which he took time off from the musical Dirty Rotten Scoundrels to do so. He also appeared in the Houston Ballet and Pennsylvania Ballet productions in 2007 and 2008 respectively. In the 2013 New York City Ballet revival, actor Jack Noseworthy served as the narrator.

== Children's book and CD ==
Lithgow's children's book and accompanying CD of the same name was released in 2004.

== Original cast ==
The original cast includes Lithgow, appearing as the school nurse and an elephant, and School of American Ballet student P.J. Verhoest, who plays Oliver Pendleton Percy III. The rest of the cast are New York City Ballet dancers, with the principal roles originated by:

- Charles Askegard
- Kyra Nichols
- James Fayette
- Yvonne Borree
- Rachel Rutherford
- Pascale van Kipnis
- Arch Higgins
- Christine Redpath
