= Susan Hendl =

American ballet dancer (1947–2020)

- Born: Susan Coxe Hendl; September 18, 1947; New York City, U.S.
- Died: October 12, 2020 (aged 73); NewYork-Presbyterian Hospital, New York City, U.S.
- Education: School of American Ballet
- Occupations: ballet dancer; répétiteur
- Organization: New York City Ballet
- Father: Walter Hendl

Susan Coxe Hendl (September 18, 1947 – October 12, 2020) was an American ballet dancer and répétiteur. She danced with the New York City Ballet between 1963 and 1983, then staged and coached works by George Balanchine and Jerome Robbins for both NYCB and other companies.

== Early life ==
Hendl was born in New York City to Walter Hendl, a composer and conductor, and Mary Newbold Hendl (née Williams), a visual artist. After Walter Hendl became the Dallas Symphony Orchestra's music director, the family relocated to Dallas.

Susan Hendl took a ballet class with Alexandra Danilova, a Russian-born ballerina who taught at the School of American Ballet, when Hendl was in preschool. Following her parents' separation, she and her mother moved to Wilkes-Barre, Pennsylvania, and she continued her training with Pennsylvania Ballet founder Barbara Weisberger. In 1959, Hendl entered the School of American Ballet in New York City and studied at the Professional Children's School.

== Career ==
Hendl joined the New York City Ballet in 1963 at age 16. In 1970, she performed her first lead role, the Strip Tease girl in George Balanchine's Slaughter on Tenth Avenue, for which the New York Times commented that she "danced with an unabashed enthusiasm." She became a soloist in 1972, and created roles in Balanchine's Who Cares?, Coppélia, Le tombeau de Couperin and Chaconne, and Jerome Robbins's The Goldberg Variations and Requiem Canticles. In 1978, she danced another role in The Goldberg Variations, and Jennifer Dunning of the New York Times commented, "Hendl filled the stage with luxuriously stretched arabesques and the delicate detail of her head and arm work. Her turns had the proper negligible spin to them and a last soaring lift added fleetingly elegiac note to the close of the first section." She was also known for her performance in Robbins' Dances at a Gathering.

Hendl worked with choreographer Peter Martins in the 1970s, and in 1979, she assisted Balanchine and Robbins in Le Bourgeois Gentilhomme for the New York City Opera, which starred Rudolf Nureyev. She retired from performing in 1983, the same year Balanchine died. She then assumed the role of assistant ballet master at the New York City Ballet, and staged Balanchine and Robbins' works for other companies, including Dances at a Gathering for The Royal Ballet and San Francisco Ballet. She was a trustee for the George Balanchine Trust, and stepped down from the New York City Ballet in 2018 due to her health.

== Death ==
Hendl died from renal failure on October 12, 2020, at the NewYork-Presbyterian Hospital. She was 73.
