= Thou Swell (ballet) =

Ballet by Peter Martins

Thou Swell is a ballet created by New York City Ballet's balletmaster-in-chief Peter Martins to the songs of Richard Rodgers in an arrangement by Glen Kelly with orchestrations Don Sebesky.

The music is performed by an on stage trio and two singers. During the course of the ballet one of the male dancers (Nilas Martins in the original cast) "sits in" at the piano. The premiere took place on 22 January 2003 at the New York State Theater, Lincoln Center, with scenery by Robin Wagner, costumes by Julius Lumsden, supervised by Holly Hynes, and lighting by Mark Stanley.

== Featured songs ==
(Song used and date of composition):

- "Where or When" (1937)
- "Manhattan" (1925)
- "Mountain Greenery" (1926)
- "My Heart Stood Still" (1927)
- "This Can't Be Love" (1938)
- "Bewitched, Bothered and Bewildered" (1940)
- "The Lady Is a Tramp" (1937)
- "Blue Moon" (1934)
- "Getting to Know You" (1951)
- "Lover" (1932)
- "The Most Beautiful Girl in the World" (1935)
- "With a Song in My Heart" (1929)
- "Isn't It Romantic?" (1932),
- "You Took Advantage of Me" (1928)
- "Thou Swell" (1927)
- "Falling in Love with Love" (1938)

== Original cast ==
- Maria Kowroski
- Yvonne Borree
- Rachel Rutherford
- Darci Kistler
- Charles Askegard
- Nilas Martins
- James Fayette
- Jock Soto

== Reviews ==
- Kisselgoff, Anna (November 28, 2002). "City Ballet Opens, Richard Rodgers on Its Mind". The New York Times.
- NY Times review by Alastair Macaulay, June 10, 2008
