= Chaconne (ballet) =

Ballet made by George Balanchine

Chaconne is a ballet made by New York City Ballet co-founder and ballet master George Balanchine to ballet music from Gluck's Orfeo ed Euridice (Vienna, 1762; Paris, 1774). The premiere took place Wednesday, 22 January 1976 at the New York State Theater, Lincoln Center, with lighting by Ronald Bates; Robert Irving conducted. Chaconne was danced in practice clothes at its premiere; Karinska's costumes were added in the spring season.

The finale to Orfeo ed Euridice is a chaconne, a dance form built on a short bass phrase and often used by 17th and 18th century opera composers to achieve a festive mood at the end. The choreography was first performed at the Hamburgische Staatsoper in their 1963 production of Orpheus und Eurydike and somewhat altered in Chaconne, especially that for the principal dancers. Balanchine added the pas de deux for Suzanne Farrell and Peter Martins to the 1976 ballet and the opening ensemble (to the 1774 Dance of the Blessed Spirits) for the Spring season.

Balanchine's first Orpheus and Eurydice was made on the Metropolitan Opera in 1936; his approach, the singers remaining in the pit while the action was danced on stage, was not well received; the production had only two performances. He choreographed Orphée et Eurydice for the Théâtre National de l'Opéra, Paris in 1973 and Orfeo ed Euridice for the Chicago Lyric Opera in 1975 as well.

== Original cast ==
Pas de trois

- Renee Estopinal
- Wilhelmina Frankfurt
- Jay Jolley

Pas de deux

- Susan Hendl
- Jean-Pierre Frohlich

Pas de cinq

- Elise Flagg
- Bonita Borne
- Elyse Borne
- Laura Flagg
- Nichol Hlinka

Pas de deux

- Suzanne Farrell
- Peter Martins

Chaconne

- Suzanne Farrell
- Susan Pilarre
- Marjorie Spohn
- Tracy Bennett

and corps de ballet

- Peter Martins
- Gerard Ebitz

== Filmography ==
- 1978 TFC, Peter Martins: A Dancer, pas de deux*

== Videography / DVD ==
- 1995 Nonesuch, The Balanchine Library: Choreography by Balanchine, excerpts (1978)
- 2001 Kultur, Peter Martins: A Dancer, pas de deux
- 2004 Kultur, Balanchine, excerpts

== Television ==
- 1978 PBS, Dance in America, excerpts
- 1978 CBC, Montreal
- 1983 PBS, Gala of Stars, excerpt
- 1984 TF1, Faust

== Articles ==
- Sunday NY Times by Clive Barnes, February 1, 1976
- Sunday NY Times by Elizabeth Kendall, February 8, 1976
- NY Times by Anna Kisselgoff, February 16, 1976
- NY Times by Daniel J. Wakin, October 23, 2010

== Reviews ==
- NY Times review by Clive Barnes, January 24, 1976
- NY Times review by Clive Barnes, February 9, 1976
- NY Times review by Anna Kisselgoff, January 31, 1982
- NY Times review by Anna Kisselgoff, May 28, 1987
- NY Times review by Jack Anderson, February 8, 1994
- NY Times review by Jack Anderson, June 30, 2001
- NY Times review by Jack Anderson, May 3, 2003
- NY Times review by Alastair Macaulay, November 27, 2007

=== film ===
- "NY Times review of Dance in America". NY Times. Archived from the original on May 27, 2008.
