= Twinkliana =

Twinkliana is a ballet made by Sean Lavery, assistant to the ballet master in chief at New York City Ballet, for students of the Barnard College Dance Department, to Mozart's Variations on "Ah vous dirai-je, Maman" (or "Twinkle, Twinkle, Little Star"). The premiere took place Thursday, 11 October 1990 at Barnard's Minor Latham Playhouse. It represents an homage to George Balanchine, whose works include Ivesiana, Mozartiana and Glinkaiana (who was, in turn, paying tribute to Fokine's Chopiniana).

The ballet begins with a series of solos, followed by a pas de deux and a finale. It was revived at the School of American Ballet (SAB) Workshop in June, 2007.

== Original cast ==
- Cecilia Stancell
- Ede Thurrell
- Jennifer Abramson
- Annette Ezekiel
- Margot Kong
- Jennifer Miller
- Dominic Antonucci, guest dancer from the SAB
