= Alexandra Waterbury =

American ballet dancer and model

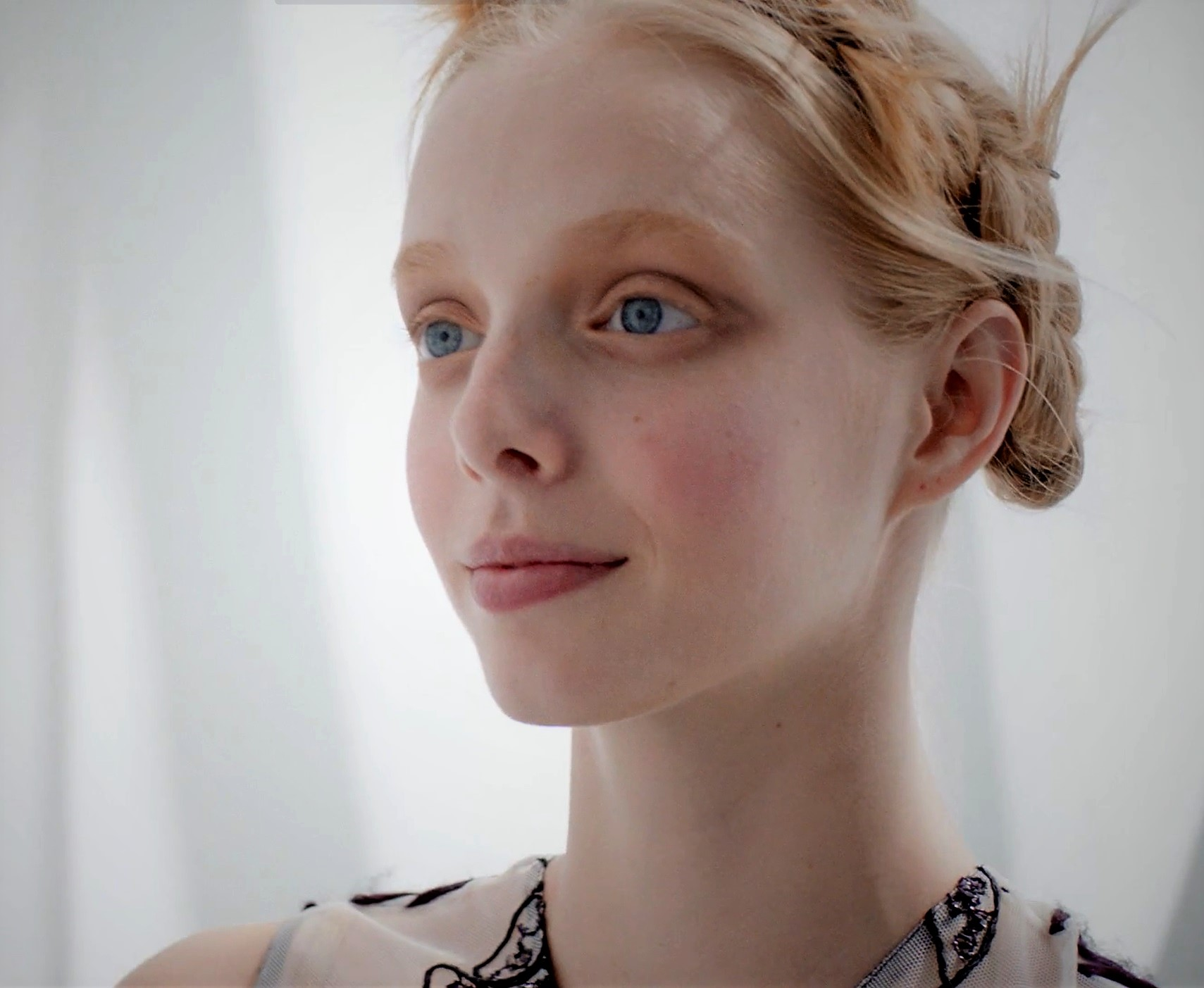
- Waterbury in 2017
- Born: Old Forge, New York
- Education: School of American Ballet
- Alma mater: Columbia University
- Occupations: ballet dancer fashion model
- Known for: Lawsuit against New York City Ballet and Chase Finlay

Alexandra Waterbury is an American ballet dancer and fashion model. In September 2018 she began a lawsuit against her former boyfriend and his employer—principal dancer Chase Finlay and New York City Ballet—and several other parties, alleging that the individuals named shared sexually explicit images and videos of Waterbury without her consent, and that the institutions named were co-liable. The case has since ended without verdict and Waterbury has enrolled as a law student at Albany Law School after the end of the case.

== Early life and career ==
Waterbury is from Old Forge, New York. She trained at the School of American Ballet (SAB) in New York City from 2013 to 2016.

Waterbury is signed with Wilhelmina Models, City Models, and Munich Models. In July 2016 Waterbury was the cover-girl L'Officiel Thailand. In October 2017 Waterbury was photographed by Isaac Anthony for an editorial in Design Scene. In March 2018 she was featured in a fashion editorial for L'Officiel's American publication. In October 2018 Waterbury modeled for Lululemon Athletica's Royal Ballet Collection.

Waterbury was scheduled to dance as a guest artist in Ballez's production of Giselle in 2020. The show was postponed to June 2021 due to the COVID-19 pandemic in the United States. Waterbury completed an undergraduate degree at Columbia University in Politics and has since started law school at Albany Law School in New York.

== Personal life and NYCB lawsuit ==
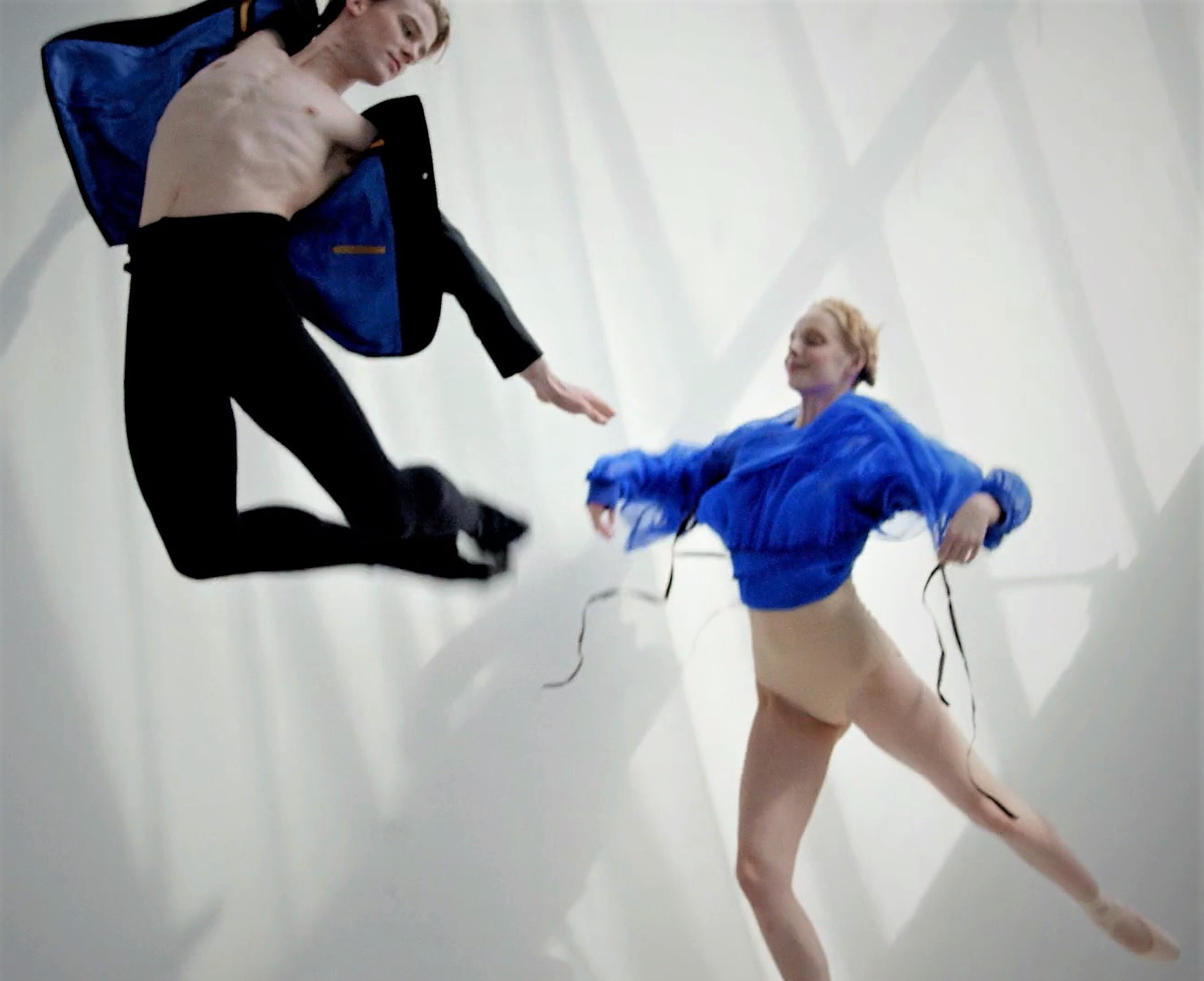
Chase Finlay and Waterbury, 2017

Waterbury was in a relationship with Chase Finlay from 2016 until 2018. In September 2018 Waterbury began a civil action in New York County Supreme Court against NYCB principal dancers Finlay, Amar Ramasar and Zachary Catazaro; NYCB patron Jared Longhitano; New York City Ballet; and SAB. Her lawsuit claimed harm by Finlay for allegedly taking and sharing sexually explicit photos and videos of Waterbury without her knowledge or consent, and by Ramasar, Catazaro, Longhitano, NYCB and SAB for allegedly contributing to that harm in various ways. Waterbury's suit led to Finlay's resignation from NYCB and the firing of Ramasar and Catazaro.

In April 2019, an arbitrator ordered Ramasar and Catazaro reinstated; Catazaro decided not to rejoin the company. The defendants disputed key factual allegations made in the complaint as well as their liability under New York law, and all filed motions to dismiss. In September 2020, the trial court (Judge James Edward D'Auguste presiding) dismissed Waterbury's claims against all defendants except Finlay.

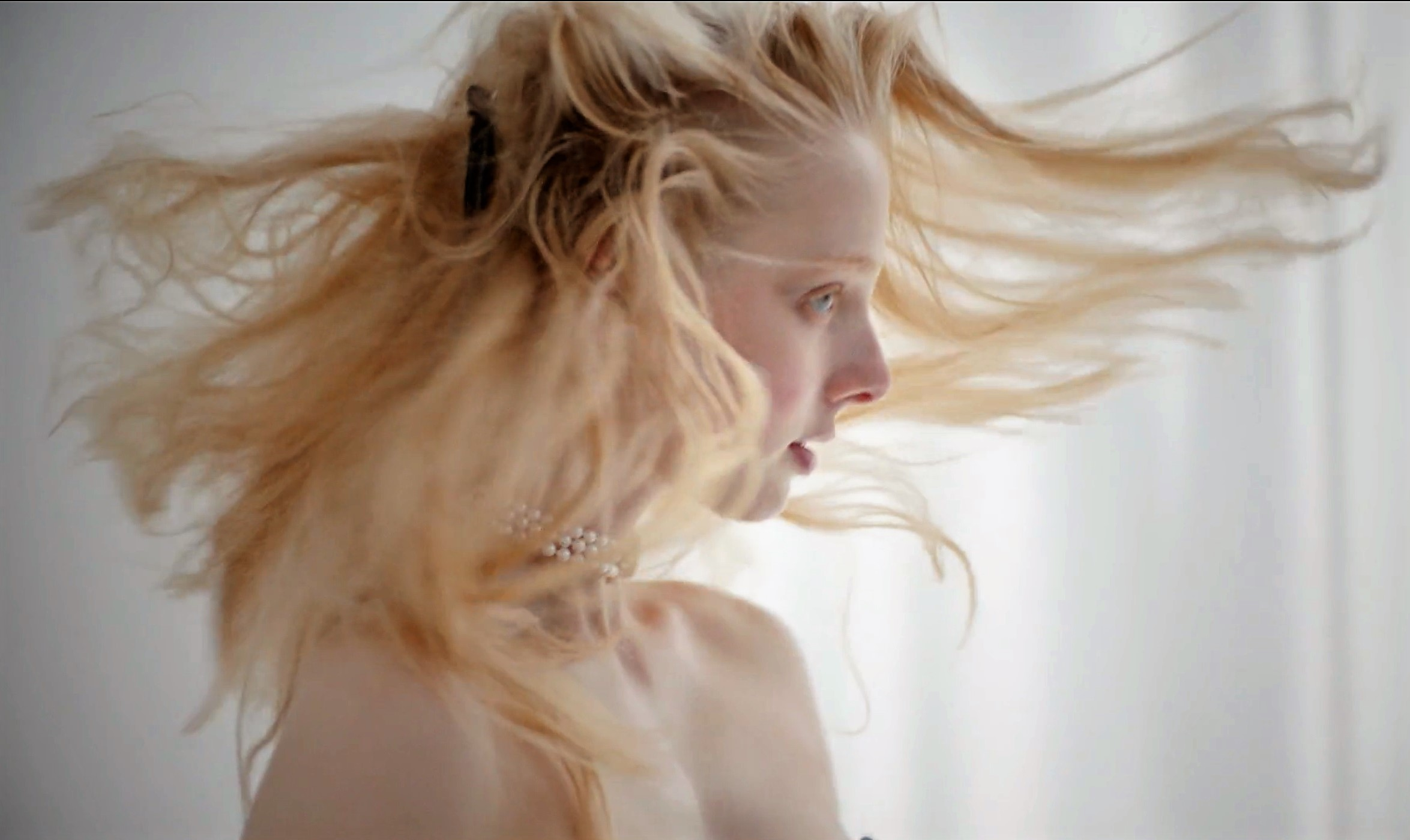
Waterbury, 2017

In April 2022, Waterbury's claim against New York City Ballet for negligent hiring and retention was reinstated in a 4–1 decision by the New York State Supreme Court Appellate Division.

Although there were no public reports of a settlement agreement, in February 2023, Waterbury agreed to withdraw "with prejudice" (i.e., permanently) all claims against NYCB and Finlay "without costs or attorneys' fees to any party."

The appeals court ruling in the Waterbury case was cited by more than a dozen other decisions in its first year, including a case against Disney, Miramax and others for negligent hiring and retention of Harvey Weinstein and several New York Child Victims Act suits against religious institutions.

== See also ==
- List of female dancers
