= Romance No. 2 (Beethoven) =

Composition by Ludwig van Beethoven

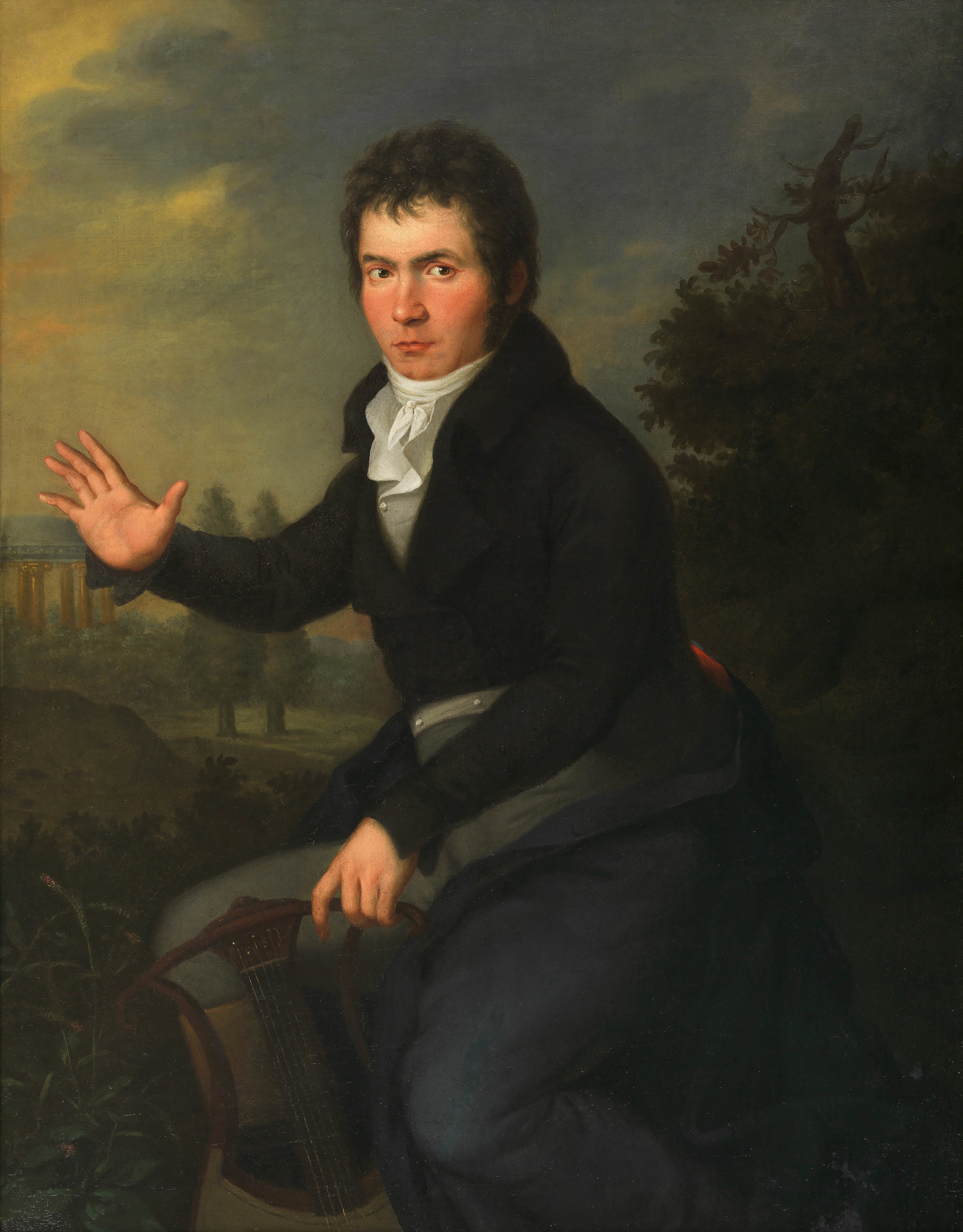
Portrait of Ludwig van Beethoven (age 33) by Joseph Willibrord Mähler (c. 1804)

The Romance No. 2 for violin and orchestra in F major, Op. 50, is the second of two such compositions by Ludwig van Beethoven. It was written in 1798 but not published until 1805 (by which time Beethoven had completed and published the other work, Romance No. 1 in G major, Op. 40). The score calls for solo violin, one flute, two oboes, two bassoons, two horns and strings. The length is about eight minutes, and Beethoven gives the tempo "Adagio Cantabile."

The autograph manuscript of the work is preserved in the Library of Congress.

The opening bars for the solo violin

A ballet based on this work, titled Beethoven Romance, was premiered by New York City Ballet on 2 February 1989.
