= Sara Leland =

American ballet dancer (1941–2020)

- Born: Sally Harrington; August 2, 1941; Melrose, Massachusetts, U.S.
- Died: November 28, 2020 (aged 79); Westwood, New Jersey, U.S.
- Occupations: ballet dancer; répétiteur
- Organization: New York City Ballet
- Spouse: Arthur Kevorkian (m. 1975; div. 1993)
- Father: Leland "Hago" Harrington

Sally Harrington (August 2, 1941 – November 28, 2020), known professionally as Sara Leland, was an American ballet dancer and répétiteur. She started her career with the Joffrey Ballet in 1959, and was recruited to join the New York City Ballet by George Balanchine in 1960. She was promoted to principal dancer in 1972, and created roles for both Balanchine and Jerome Robbins.

In the mid 1970s, she started staging Balanchine's and Robbins' works in both the U.S. and abroad. In 1981, the New York City Ballet appointed her assistant ballet master, and she retired from performing in 1983, but continued to stage and coach ballets. As a répétiteur, she had worked on more than 30 ballets.

== Early life ==
Leland was born Sally Harrington in Melrose, Massachusetts on August 2, 1941. Her father, Leland "Hago" Harrington, was an ice hockey player who played for the Boston Bruins. Sally started ballet at age five, with her sister who needed ballet as physical therapy, though Leland's talent was noticed and she started training with E. Virginia Williams, who founded New England Civic Ballet (now Boston Ballet), while Leland's mother both worked at the company front desk and made costumes, and would become the executive director of Boston Ballet.

== Career ==
In 1959, Robert Joffrey invited Leland to join his company, the Joffrey Ballet, after seeing her dance with the New England Civic Ballet. The following year, while Leland was in Boston, she took a class with Williams at the New England Civic Ballet. George Balanchine, an artistic advisor of the company, spotted her and recruited her to join the New York City Ballet. The same year, she was cast as a lead role in Les Biches, Francisco Moncion's new ballet.

Leland was made soloist in 1963, and was chosen to dance lead roles in works by Balanchine, Jerome Robbins and Frederick Ashton. Whilst a soloist, her role creations include Balanchine's "Emeralds" from Jewels, and Robbins' Dances at a Gathering and The Goldberg Variations. For the latter two, Leland also assisted Robbins since she could learn the choreography quickly.

In 1972, she became a principal dancer. The promotion came shortly before the company's Stravinsky Festival, in which she danced Balanchine's Lost Sonata and Symphony in Three Movements. She went on to create roles in Balanchine's Vienna Waltzes and Union Jack. Other ballets she was known for include Balanchine's Serenade, Brahms–Schoenberg Quartet, Agon, La Valse, Davidsbündlertänze, The Nutcracker and Don Quixote. She retired from performing in 1983.

In the mid-1970s, Leland started staging Balanchine and Robbins' works in both the U.S. and abroad, and at Balanchine's request, she also coached principal female roles. She was appointed assistant balletmaster with the New York City Ballet in 1981, whilst an active dancer, and continued to stage and coach ballets after she stopped dancing. In a 1982 interview, she stated she watched Balanchine rehearse closely and as often as possible, in order to learn the ballets so accurately that she would "never forget them and can stage them in the future exactly as he intended". Due to her ability to remember choreography, she was able to teach more than 30 ballets.

== Personal life ==
In 1975, Leland married Arthur Kevorkian, a businessman. The marriage ended in divorce in 1993. In her later life, she lived in New City, New York.

== Death ==
On November 28, 2020, Leland died from congestive heart failure in Westwood, New Jersey. She was 79.
