= Andrew Veyette =

American dancer

- Citizenship: American
- Occupation: ballet dancer
- Years active: 1998 - present
- Organization: New York City Ballet
- Spouse(s): Megan Fairchild (2011 - 2015), Ashley Hod
- Awards: Mae L. Wien Award for Outstanding Promise (2000)

Andrew Veyette is an American ballet dancer. He won a Mae L. Wien Award for Outstanding Promise in 2000 and joined the New York City Ballet in the same year. He has been a principal dancer at the organization since 2007.

== History ==
Veyette was born in Denver, Colorado. He started practicing dance at the age of 9. He joined the New York City Ballet as an apprentice in 2000, two years after entering the School of American Ballet. He became a soloist in 2006 and was promoted to principal dancer in 2007. Veyette is an instructor of choreography at New York's Ballet Academy East.

Veyette announced his retirement in 2025, at the age of 42. His last performance is scheduled to be Stars and Stripes, a performance that won him the 2000 Mae L. Wien award and that he had been practicing since the age of 12.

== Personal life ==
Veyette married fellow New York City Ballet principal dancer Megan Fairchild in July 2011. After their divorce in 2015, he married Ashley Hod, a soloist at the same organization.
