= Beethoven Romance =

Ballet by Peter Martins

Beethoven Romance is a ballet made by New York City Ballet ballet master in chief Peter Martins to the composer's Romance in F for violin and orchestra, Op. 50 (1805). The premiere took place on 2 February 1989 at the New York State Theater, Lincoln Center, with costumes by Heather Watts and lighting by Mark Stanley.

== Original cast ==
- Kyra Nichols
- Adam Lüders
