= The Goldberg Variations (ballet) =

- Choreographer: Jerome Robbins
- Music: Johann Sebastian Bach
- Premiere: May 27, 1971; New York State Theater
- Original ballet company: New York City Ballet
- Design: Joe Eula; Thomas Skelton
- Genre: Neoclassical ballet

The Goldberg Variations is a ballet choreographed by Jerome Robbins to Bach's Goldberg Variations. A plotless ballet, it starts with two performers dancing to the Theme, followed by the variations divided into two parts, with variations repeated as Bach had intended in the score. Robbins made the ballet for the New York City Ballet, and premiered on May 27, 1971, at the New York State Theater.

== Choreography ==
The ballet starts with the Theme, with two dancers in Baroque costumes. It is followed by the variations that are divided in two parts, with two sets of dancers. The variations consist of solos, duets, trios, quartets, quintets, sextets and group numbers. Author Deborah Jowitt wrote this part is "more playful and experimental" It features dancers in jewel tone practice clothes. Jowitt described Part II as "more formal, classical and mature." In Part II, the dancers add bits to their costumes, at first shirts for men, and breeches and short skirts for women, and later tutus and jackets. In the final variation, when dancers in both parts of the ballet appear in full period costumes. At the end of the ballet, the couple who danced the Theme reappears in leotards and repeat the Theme.

Robbins attempted to avoid all narrative implications outside of the designs. However, Jowitt noted that he nevertheless incorporates qualities he found in the score, such as "pensive", "playful", "tentative" and "intimate". As intended in the score, Robbins included every repeat of the variations, even the ones that concert pianists sometimes skip. As a result, the ballet is about 1.5 hours long.

== Production ==
Robbins said that after working Dances at a Gathering, to music by Frédéric Chopin, he wanted to work on something less romantic, "I wanted to see what would happen if I got hold of something that didn't give me any easy finger ledge to climb." He decided to choreograph to Bach's Goldberg Variations, which he viewed as "very big and architectural".

Robbins began working on the ballet in early spring 1970. He struggled with choreographing the ballet. He said, 'It was like approaching a beautiful marble wall, I could get no toehold, no leverage to get inside that building. The first weeks of rehearsal were as if I were hitting it and falling down, and having no start over. Robbins said that the large number of dancers is not the biggest challenge. Instead, he said, "The challenge of Goldberg is that it's thirty variations all in the same key and formally all alike." However, this also provide "endlessly rich" number of interpretations. On the second day of rehearsal, Robbins snapped his Achilles tendon when he was demonstrating a step to the dancers. As a result, he choreographed part of the ballet on a wheelchair.

Though the ballet was set to premiere at the New York City Ballet's annual appearance at Saratoga Springs, New York, in summer 1970, the ballet was not complete. Instead, on July 4, an open rehearsal was held for The Goldberg Variations. The dancers were in practice clothes, while Robbins explained the ballet to the audience at the side of the stage. The company then went on summer hiatus. Later that year, Robbins was hospitalised due to hepatitis. He would later blame it for parts of the ballet he disliked. It ultimately took Robbins a year to complete the ballet. Allegra Kent was set to appear in an all-female quartet before it was cut. Violette Verdy had also worked on the ballet but never performed it.

Robbins was undecided on whether to use a piano or harpsichord until very late in the process. Though a harpsichord was used in Saratoga Springs, he ultimately went for the piano as he found harpsichord not loud enough in a theater. The costume was designed by Joe Eula, and the lighting was by Thomas Skelton. Charles Rosen contributed on the program note.

== Original cast ==
Movements	Dancers
Theme	Renee Estópinal, Michael Steele
Part I Variations	Gelsey Kirkland, Sara Leland, John Clifford, Robert Weiss, Robert Maiorano, Bruce Wells; Bryan Pitts, David Richardson, Suzanne Erlon, Delia Peters, Christine Redpath, Bettijane Sills, Gloriann Hicks, Virginia Stuart, Stephen Caras, Hermes Condé, Richard Dryden, Francis Dackett
Part II Variations	Karin von Aroldingen, Susan Hendl, Patricia McBride, Peter Martins, Anthony Blum, Helgi Tómasson; Merrill Ashley, Rosemary Dunleavy, Renee Estopinal, Anne Goldstein, Johnna Kirkland, Deborah Polish, Gail Kachadurian, Colleen Neary, Susan Pilarre, Giselle Roberge, Polly Shelton, Marjorie Spohn, Lynne Stetson, Marilee Stiles, Stephen Caras, Victor Castelli, Hermes Condé, Richard Dryden, William Johnson, Bryan Pitts, David Richardson, Francis Sackett, Nolan T’Sani

== Performances ==
The Goldberg Variations premiered on May 27, 1971, at the New York State Theater. Gordon Boelzner played the piano at the premiere.

Apart from the New York City Ballet, Paris Opera Ballet also performed the ballet.

== Critical reception ==
New York Times's Clive Barnes praised the ballet, calling it "a work of such amplitude and grandeur that it make you fall in love with the human body all over again. In Ballet Review, Arlene Croce criticised the ballet, "The trouble with Goldberg is that it doesn't exist as a ballet. When Robbins wrestled every last musical repeat to the mat, we don't come away with a theatrical experience but with an impression of endless ingenious musical visualizations.
