= Zachary Catazaro =

American ballet dancer

- Zachary Catazaro in 2016
- Born: 1989 (age 36–37); Canton, Ohio
- Education: School of American Ballet, Canton Ballet, Chautauqua Institution
- Known for: Ballet Now and The Nutcracker and the Four Realms

Zachary Catazaro (born 1989) is an American ballet dancer and former principal dancer of the New York City Ballet and Bayerisches Staatsballett.

== Early life and education ==
Zachary Catazaro was born in Canton, Ohio. His mother, Jennifer Catazaro Hayward, was a ballet dancer and School of American Ballet (SAB) alumna. His father, Thomas Allen Clark, was a professional ballroom dancer. Catazaro started ballet at the age of five at the Canton Ballet, while simultaneously taking gymnastics and playing basketball and baseball. He trained with his mother Jennifer Catazaro Hayward, Cassandra Crowley, and Laura Alonso, daughter of the famed Cuban dancer Alicia Alonso. In 2002 and 2003, Catazaro won First Place in the Junior Men's Division at the Youth America Grand Prix (YAGP) in Chicago, IL, with his performances of Paquita and Don Quixote. At age 14, Catazaro started attending summer programs at the School of American Ballet, American Ballet Theatre (ABT) and the Chautauqua Institution, with teachers Peter Boal, Andrei Kramarevsky, Johan Renvall, Jean-Pierre Bonnefoux, Patricia McBride, and Michael Vernon. At Chautauqua he performed lead roles in George Balanchine's Donizetti Variations and Vasily Vainonen's Flames of Paris. At age 16, Catazaro was invited to attend SAB's year-round program, where he was mentored by New York City Ballet Principal dancers Sean Lavery and Jock Soto. While at SAB, he was asked to learn the role of Romeo in Peter Martins' Romeo and Juliet and danced the principal part in George Balanchine's Gounod Symphony as well as in the ensemble of Peter Martins' Les Gentilhommes for his workshop performance in 2007.

== Career ==
Catazaro became an apprentice with the New York City Ballet in 2007. At this time, he performed a principal role in the revival of Jerome Robbins' Watermill. He became a member of the Corps de Ballet in 2008, performing featured roles such as the male lead in Diamonds from Jewels, the Cavalier in The Nutcracker and Shakespeare's comedic and temperamental Demetrius in A Midsummer Night's Dream, all by George Balanchine. Catazaro also performed the role of Romeo in Peter Martins' Romeo and Juliet.

In 2014, Catazaro was learning a lead role in Peter Martins' Barber Violin Concerto, while rehearsing for several other ballets that season. As a result of a foot injury, he had to pull out from his performances, yet Peter Martins' response was quite unexpected. "Well, I was going to wait until the end of the season, but since we are here now, I am promoting you to soloist," said Martins in a meeting with Catazaro and ballet mistress Rosemary Dunleavy. In the years that followed as a soloist, Catazaro danced the male lead in George Balanchine's Apollo, Titania's Cavalier in A Midsummer Night's Dream, Serenade, Prince Siegfried in Swan Lake, the poet in La Sonnabula, Gold in Sleeping Beauty, and the ensemble in Jerome Robbins' N.Y. Export Opus Jazz.

Catazaro was promoted to Principal dancer with New York City Ballet in 2018, following his performances of Prince Siegfried in Swan Lake. While a Principal, he danced the lead in George Balanchine's Tchaikovsky Pas de Deux, The Four Seasons (Fall), Dances at a Gathering and The Four Temperaments.

In September 2018, New York City Ballet fired Catazaro as a principal dancer after he was named in a lawsuit in which a woman accused another dancer of inappropriately sharing texts of sexually explicit photographs.

The company investigated the allegations against him and fellow dancer Amar Ramasar and determined that they had “engaged in inappropriate communications, that while personal, off-hours and off-site, had violated the norms of conduct” it expects from dancers.

In 2019, Catazaro was invited by former New York City Ballet Principal dancer Igor Zelensky to be a Principal guest artist with the Bayerisches Staatsballett in Munich, Germany. There, he performed George Balanchine's Diamonds from Jewels, Yury Grigorovich's Spartacus, John Neumeier's Lady of the Camellias, Christian Spuck's Anna Karenina, and John Cranko's Onegin.

In 2020, he performed Jerome Robbins’ In the Night with Paris Opera Ballet Etoile Eleonora Abbagnato and the Teatro dell'Opera di Roma, where he reunited with his former New York City Ballet Ballet Master Jean-Pierre Frohlich.

Throughout his career, Catazaro frequented the stage at Vail International Dance Festival as well as many other International Dance Galas.

== Other work ==
In 2017, Catazaro signed with DNA Model Management and was featured in the Bloomingdale's Mix Masters 2018 campaign as well as Samuelsohn's Fall/Winter 2017 campaign. He has also worked with brands such as Hugo Boss, Todd Snyder, and Ermenegildo Zegna.

== Filmography ==
- Steven Cantor's Ballet Now (2018)
- Disney's The Nutcracker and the Four Realms (2018)
