= Amar Ramasar =

Ballet dancer

- Born: December 9, 1981 (age 44); New York City, U.S.
- Occupation: Ballet dancer
- Spouse: Elysia Dawn Fridkin (m. 2011; div. 2016)
- Dancing career
- Current group: New York City Ballet

Amar Ramasar (born December 9, 1981) is an American ballet dancer and former principal dancer of the New York City Ballet (NYCB). Ramasar joined the NYCB as an apprentice in 2000 and joined the corps de ballet in 2001. As of 2010, Ramasar remained the only person of color who was a principal in NYCB.

In 2018, Ramasar was fired from NYCB for sharing explicit pictures of female dancers without their knowledge or consent. In 2019, he made his debut at the Teatro dell'Opera in Rome. That same year, a union arbitrator ruled that, while suspension from NYCB was fitting, his firing was too severe a punishment. As a result, the arbitrator ordered Ramasar to be reinstated by the NYCB. In July 2021, the NYCB announced that Ramasar was retiring in May 2022.

== Education and early career ==
Amar Ramasar was born in the Bronx, New York City. His father, who is of Indo-Trinidadian descent, is a former United States Marine who worked as a computer technician while Ramasar was growing up. His mother, who is Puerto Rican, worked as a registered nurse. Outgoing and talkative as a child, he says, "No one knew anything about ballet in my family."

When Ramasar was 10 years old, he impressed a music teacher in his public school with his creative talents. The teacher urged him to audition for the TADA! Youth Theater. Ramasar was one of two children selected from more than 300 who tried out. Because his parents worked full-time, Ramasar learned to take the New York City Subway from his home in the South Bronx to the studio on the Lower East Side, and rode public transit to get to the daily rehearsals.

Ramasar took his first dance lesson at the Henry Street Settlement House's Abrons Arts Center in 1993. His family was indifferent about his decision to dance. "My father didn't prevent me from doing it, but he didn't make it easy," he says. When Ramasar was 14 he auditioned for the School of American Ballet, a school which trains young dancers who wish to try out for the New York City Ballet. He was accepted in 1993, and received his first ballet lesson there.

His family had no money to support his dance education, and Ramasar relied exclusively on scholarships to pay his tuition. His first years at the School of American Ballet were difficult. Ramasar was years behind the other boys (some of whom were as young as six years old) in athleticism and technique. He later said he felt discouraged by how far behind he was: "I would look around and see all these boys who were turned-out and beautiful, and I was just a clumsy Bronx boy. It took a lot of willpower" to stay in school. Ramasar voiced his doubts to teacher Olga Kostritzky and told her he was going to drop ballet for acting. "You want to play a robber, be in movies," she told him. "You want to be a prince, stay in the ballet."

Peter Martins, then-director of both the School of American Ballet and the New York City Ballet, proved critical in helping Ramasar develop as a dancer, giving him 10 minutes of partnering tutoring after each class. Ramasar received high praise at the School of American Ballet year-end workshops, and studied at the American Ballet Theatre's Summer Program and The Rock School for Dance Education.

== NYC Ballet ==
Ramasar joined the New York City Ballet as an apprentice in 2000, and joined the corps de ballet in 2001. Martins cast him in role of the Cavalier in The Nutcracker in 2001. Ramasar's father watched him dance for the first time in this role. "I think then he understood," Ramasar said. He became a soloist in March 2006, and was promoted to a principal in October 2009. Ramasar's promotion was noted by a critic as good thing, because "change at NYCB is itself a gift, for as younger dancers take over cherished roles, these wonderful ballets can look new all over again."

As of 2010, it was reported that Ramasar was the only person of color who is a principal in NYCB. He was quoted as saying:

I actually looked at my race as an advantage because there was no one who looked like me. In New York City Ballet especially, I felt my casting has always been great. The biggest one for me was Fancy Free because, if you think of the history of that ballet, it's not necessarily the case that in the 1940s an Indian guy was one of the sailors fighting for America. But they let me do that here, and I thought, "I’m breaking boundaries that people automatically put up for a stereotypical white ballet."

— Amar Ramasar, quoted in Dance Magazine, June, 2005. (Emphasis added.)

In January 2019, he made his debut at the Teatro dell'Opera in Rome in the ballet Carmen with the choreography by Jiří Bubeníček.

== Sexual misconduct revelations ==
In 2018, Ramasar was suspended without pay by NYCB. A statement from the NYCB board chairman said the Board has received a letter from someone outside of the company "alleging inappropriate communications made via personal text and email by three members of the company" that were "personal in nature." These accusations proved to be true. It was discovered that Ramasar had sent explicit pictures of female New York City Ballet dancers engaged in sexual acts without the women's knowledge or consent.

On September 15, 2018 a lawsuit was filed by former School of American Ballet dancer Alexandra Waterbury against New York City Ballet, Jared Longhitano, Chase Finlay, the School of American Ballet, Ramasar, and Zach Catazaro. Subsequently, Ramasar was fired from the NYC Ballet.

The termination was challenged by the American Guild of Musical Artists. On April 19, 2019, a union arbitrator ruled that discipline was warranted and that Ramasar should have been suspended. However, they stated that firing was too harsh a punishment and ordered Ramasar and Catazaro to be reinstated. In July 2021, the NYCB announced that Ramasar would retire as of May 2022, after his performance in A Midsummer Night's Dream.

In 2021, New York City Ballet dancer Georgina Pazcoguin released a memoir titled Swan Dive: The Making of a Rogue Ballerina. In it, Pazcoguin recounts her experience as Ramasar's colleague. She writes that for years, Ramasar would greet her in class “by sidling up close, whispering, ‘You look fine today,’ eyes locked on my chest, and then he’d zero in on the goal at hand by — surprise! — tweaking my nipples.” Ramasar denies this allegation.

== Other work ==
In 2000, Ramasar received the Mae L. Wien Award.

He was featured in a social studies trade textbook, Meet the Dancers, by Amy Nathan.

Ramasar appeared in NY Export: Opus Jazz, a 2010 film about that ballet.

Ramasar was a featured performer for environmental dance nonprofit vildwerk.'s 2024 inaugural program Time To Protect Our Planet at the El Museo del Barrio in Briana Reed’s Divinity in Paradox, which also featured Jacob Rodriguez, Fernando Montaño, Erin Gonzales, Gabi Roller, Eriko Sugimura and Sydney Williams. vildwerk. aims to increase environmental conservation awareness through dance.

== Critical response ==
His first featured review in The New York Times was in 2003:

A revelation came from the young Amar Ramasar, who has taken over Jock Soto's original role opposite Janie Taylor in The Infernal Machine, the convoluted acrobatic duet created by Peter Martins for the Diamond Project last spring. ... This time, there was a fresh emotional current with a dextrous partner who added a tinge of vulnerability. It was an outstanding performance from both dancers in first-class choreography that suddenly acquired the aura of an existential void. ... [A] woman's collapsible body is manipulated into wraparound positions by the man. ... Head thrown back, Ms. Taylor now evokes more angst than spunk and Mr. Ramasar, unlike Mr. Soto, is fleetingly fearful in a retreat. He stands over his partner at the end, but she has worn him out.

— Anna Kisselgoff, The New York Times

In 2005, The New York Times gave a rave review for Ramasar in a feature article:

Gifted dancers tend to grow up in public. That is true of Amar Ramasar, who has taken on a surprising range of roles for a corps dancer. He is never less than fully engaged in performance, and his joy in dancing is infectious, though it sometimes takes him over the top of his assignment.

— Jennifer Dunning, The New York Times, December 30, 2005.

In 2006, the Times called him one of the "Young dancers who are rising stars in the New York City Ballet." The same year, the Village Voice pointed out his strengths and weaknesses:

Ramasar is extremely promising, both forceful and softly muscular (he'll be better when he views "modern" moves in the context of classicism and stops lifting his shoulders and dropping his head).

— Deborah Jowitt, Village Voice

In 2006, he was named one of "25 to Watch" by Dance Magazine.

In 2007, Dance Spirit wrote that "Amar Ramasar looked too nice to be a villain" in Romeo and Juliet.

Ballet.co.uk, a British online magazine, raved in 2008 about Ramasar, even while criticizing a new dance in which he performed.

During the 2010 season Ramasar has gotten rave reviews. The Saratogian called Ramasar "hard-working" for his roles in Fancy Free and Who Cares? at the New York City Ballet summer season at the Saratoga Performing Arts Center. Their critic had "the pleasure of watching Joaquín De Luz, Tyler Angle, and Amar Ramasar dance together, truly convincing as three good sailor buddies." Ramasar's performance in Fancy Free was "enthralling its audience with Red Angels," an Albany Times Union blogger noted; "The intense color proved a dramatic backdrop to the power and strength of its four dancers: Maria Kowroski, Teresa Reichlen, Tyler Angle and Amar Ramasar." The official review from the Times Union wrote that Fancy Free, "Played with ample swagger by Tyler Angle, Joaquín De Luz and Amar Ramasar ... set the bravura tone for the entire night." In May 2010, TheArtsDesk.com noted that "the spectacularly bare-chested Amar Ramasar" had sex appeal.

== Personal life ==
Ramasar began dating Elysia Dawn Fridkin (also known as Elysia Dawn) in 2009, and they married in October 2011. She was formerly a dancer with Complexions Contemporary Ballet, artistic director of the Columbia University Ballet Collaborative, and is currently a Program Associate for MetLiveArts at the Metropolitan Museum of Art.

== See also ==
- List of New York City Ballet principal dancers
- Copy of Lawsuit Against New York City Ballet
