= Divertimento No. 15 (Mozart) =

1777 composition by W. A. Mozart

- Lodron Night Music No. 2
- by W. A. Mozart
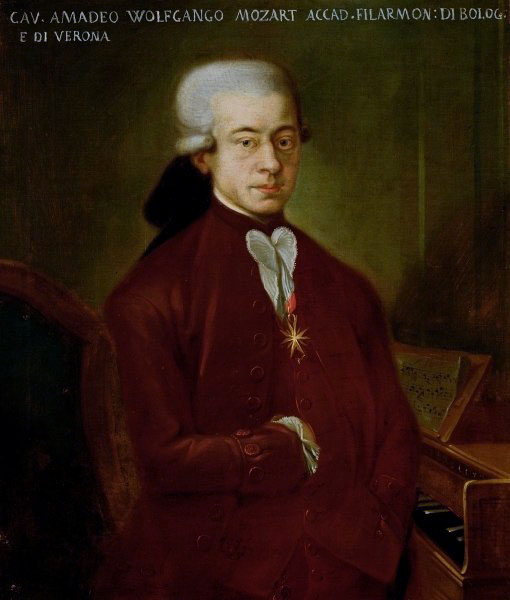
- 1777 portrait of Mozart
- Key: B♭ major
- Catalogue: K. 287/271h
- Composed: 1777
- Dedication: Maria Antonia Lodron
- Performed: 13 June 1777
- Published: 1784
- Movements: 6
- Scoring: two horns; strings

The Divertimento No. 15 in B♭ major, K. 287/271h, is a divertimento for two horns and strings by Wolfgang Amadeus Mozart. He composed the work in six movements in 1777 for the name day of Countess Maria Antonia Lodron. It is also known as the Lodronische Nachtmusik Nr. 2 (Lodron Night Music No. 2).

Mozart composed the divertimento in 1777 for the name day of Countess Maria Antonia Lodron, a family friend and member of the Salzburg aristocracy. It was first performed on 13 June 1777 at an informal outdoor party.

== Music ==
This divertimento is scored for two horns in B♭ and strings. It is structured in six movements:

1. Allegro (in B♭ major and in sonata form)
2. Tema con variazioni (Andante) (theme and six variations, where the theme and all the variations are in F major)
3. Menuetto – Trio (in B♭major and in ternary form, trio in G minor)
4. Adagio (in E♭ major and in sonata form)
5. Menuetto – Trio (in B♭ major and in ternary form, trio in E♭ major)
6. Andante – Allegro molto (in B♭ major, beginning with an introductory instrumental recitative, and in sonata rondo form)

== In ballet theatre ==
In 1952 George Balanchine choreographed for his company New York City Ballet a piece titled Caracole to this music. A few years later, he restaged it for a celebration of Mozart's bicentenary with some changes in score, choreography, costumes and set design as Divertimento No. 15. The ballet was premiered on 31 May 1956 at the American Shakespeare Theatre, Stratford, Connecticut.
