= Divertimento No. 15 (ballet) =

Ballet by George Balanchine

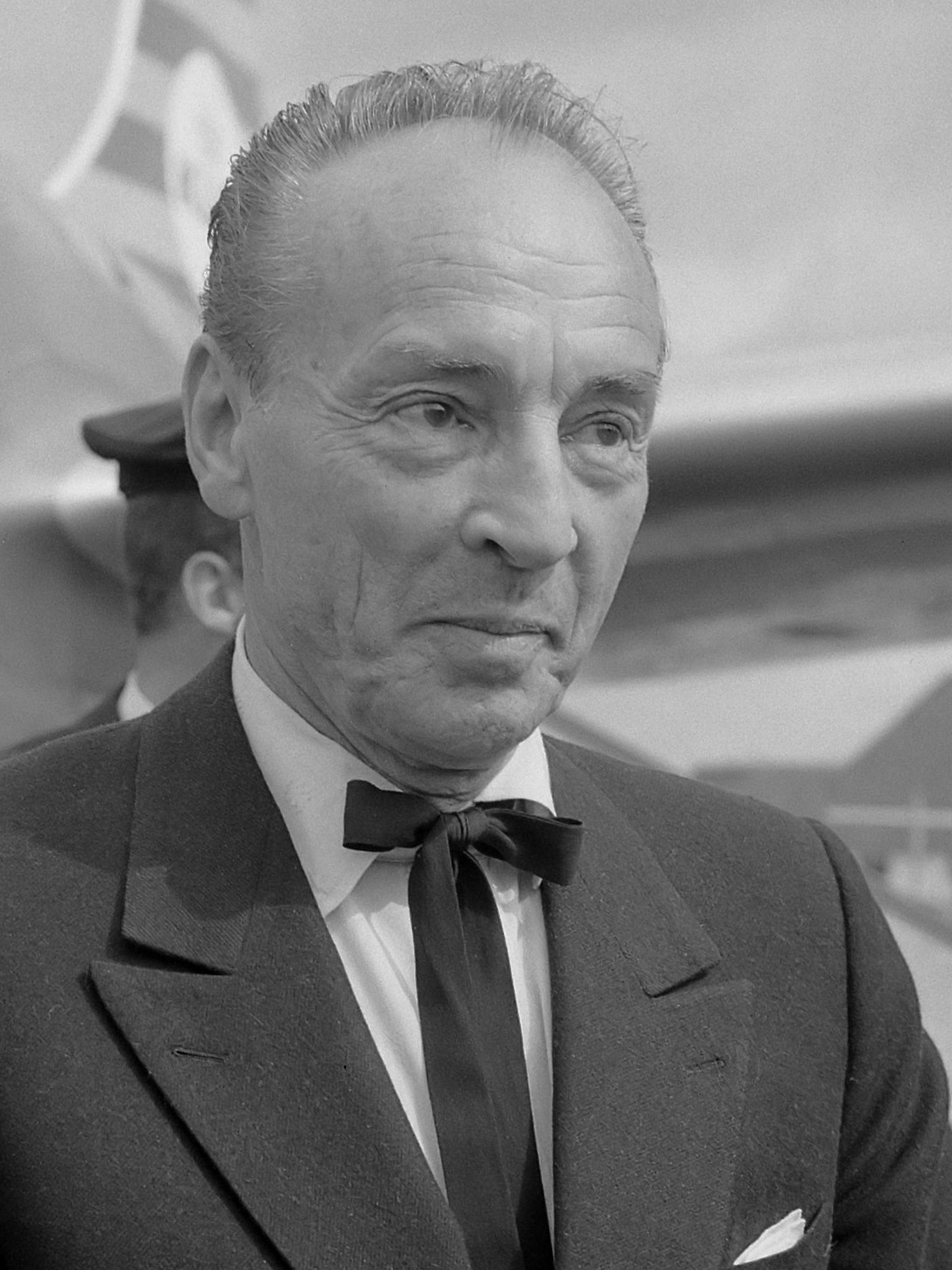
- Balanchine in 1965
- Choreographer: George Balanchine
- Music: W. A. Mozart
- Premiere: May 31, 1956; American Shakespeare Theatre
- Original ballet company: New York City Ballet
- Design: Karinska; Jean Rosenthal

Divertimento No. 15 is a ballet choreographed by George Balanchine to Mozart's eponymous music. The ballet was made for the New York City Ballet. Balanchine first choreographed the score in 1952, for a ballet titled Caracole. In 1956, he planned to revive Caracole for a celebration of Mozart's bicentenary but made a new ballet to the same music instead. Divertimento No. 15 premiered on May 31, 1956, at the American Shakespeare Theatre, Stratford, Connecticut.

== Choreography ==
Divertimento No. 15 contains five movements, Allegro, Theme and Variations, Minuet, Andante and Finale. The ballet is danced by five principal women, three men, and a corps de ballet of eight women. Balanchine wrote that Divertimento No. 15 "follows the different movements of the score. There is no story." Author Nancy Reynolds described the ballet as "Balanchine's purest dance creations – a string of dancers, solos, ensembles, pas de deux – with muted emotional overtones and little virtuoso display."

== Original cast ==
The principal dancers of the original cast were:

- Diana Adams
- Melissa Hayden
- Allegra Kent
- Tanaquil Le Clercq
- Patricia Wilde
- Herbert Bliss
- Nicholas Magallanes
- Roy Tobias

== Production ==
In 1952, Balanchine choreographed Caracole to Mozart's Divertimento No. 15 for the New York City Ballet. He first heard the score at a dinner, and considered it the best divertimento. He removed the second of two minuets and the andante opening of the sixth movement. The ballet also reused costumes Christian Bérard designed for Mozartiana. The cast featured Diana Adams, Melissa Hayden, Tanaquil Le Clercq, Maria Tallchief, Patricia Wilde, André Eglevsky, Nicholas Magallanes, Jerome Robbins and a corps de ballet of eight women. Despite receiving positive reviews, it was absent from the repertory for some time.

In 1956, Balanchine was to revive Caracole for a Mozart bicentenary celebration organised by Lincoln Kirstein, who also co-founded the New York City Ballet. However, Balanchine claimed that he and the dancers had forgotten the choreography of Caracole, so he substantially rechoreographed it, again with one of the minuet removed. According to Joel Lobenthal's biography of Wilde, the solos remained the same as Caracole but other parts of the ballet were new choreography. Other dancers in Caracole disagreed with Balanchine's claim, and said Caracole and Divertimento No. 15 are nearly identical. The new Divertimento No. 15 is nevertheless regarded as a separate ballet.

The costumes were designed by Karinska, and the lighting was by Jean Rosenthal. When the ballet premiered, it featured a set that was originally designed by James Stewart Morcom for Balanchine's 1947 ballet Symphonie Concertante. In 1966, the costumes and set were redesigned. The new set, by David Hays, featured several trellis. Karinska redesigned the costumes. From the mid-1970s onwards, the ballet is performed without decor.

== Performances ==
Divertimento No. 15 premiered May 31, 1956, at American Shakespeare Theatre, Stratford, Connecticut. The first New York performance of the ballet was in December that year. The principal dancers at the New York premiere were original cast members Adams, Hayden, Wilde, Bliss and Magallanes, as well as Yvonne Mounsey, Barbara Milberg and Jonathan Watts.

Other ballet companies that had performed the ballet include Vienna State Ballet, Bavarian State Ballet, Dutch National Ballet, Ballet du Grand Théâtre de Genève, Hamburg Ballet, Pacific Northwest Ballet, Chicago Lyric Opera Ballet, Pennsylvania Ballet, Royal Danish Ballet, Paris Opera Ballet, San Francisco Ballet, Les Grands Ballets Canadiens, Birmingham Royal Ballet, Finnish National Ballet, National Ballet of Canada, Boston Ballet, Miami City Ballet, Ballet Arizona, Suzanne Farrell Ballet, Dance Theatre of Harlem, BalletMet and Cincinnati Ballet.

== Videography ==
In 1961, a New York City Ballet performance of Divertimento No. 15 was filmed for the CBC program L'Heure du concert in Montreal.

In 1977, PBS's Dance in America broadcast a performance of the Andante movement from Divertimento No. 15 by the New York City Ballet, with a cast consisting of Tracy Bennett, Merrill Ashley, Maria Calegari, Susan Pilarre, Stephanie Saland, Marjorie Spohn, Victor Castelli and Robert Weiss.

In 2020, during the New York City Ballet's digital fall season, which replaced the canceled repertory season caused by the COVID-19 pandemic, the company released an archival video of the Theme and Variations of Divertimento No. 15. It was recorded in 2016, and featured Lauren King, Sterling Hyltin, Ana Sophia Scheller, Abi Stafford, Tiler Peck, Andrew Veyette, Daniel Applebaum and Andrew Scordato.

In 2021, for New York City Ballet's first virtual gala, held due to the COVID-19 pandemic, the finale of Divertimento No. 15 was featured in a film made by Sofia Coppola. It was danced by Peck, Veyette, King, Applebaum, Scordato, Emilie Gerrity, Ashley Laracey and Unity Phelan.
