= List of Mae L. Wien Awards recipients =

Lawrence A. Wien, his daughters and their families founded the Mae L. Wien Awards at the School of American Ballet in their mother's name.

== Mae L. Wien Faculty Award for Distinguished Service ==
Each year a faculty member is honored for distinguished service. (Note: Past Wien Awardees)

- 1987 Muriel Stuart (Note: City Ballet's School Joins Lincoln Center, Jennifer Dunning, May 5, 1987)
- 1988 Antonina Tumkovsky
- 1989 Alexandra Danilova
- 1990 Hélène Dudin
- 1991 Elise Reiman (Note: Elise Reiman, Teacher Of Ballet, Dies at 79, August 28, 1993)
- 1992 Stanley Williams (Note: Chronicle, Nadine Brozan, June 8, 1992)
- 1993 Suki Schorer
- 1994 Richard Rapp
- 1995 Andrei Kramarevsky
- 1996 Kay Mazzo
- 1997 Garielle Whittle
- 1998 Susan Pilarre
- 1999 Olga Kostritzsky
- 2000 Marina Stavitskaya
- 2001 Peter Boal
- 2002 Jock Soto
- 2003 Sheryl Ware
- 2004 Nathalie Gleboff
- 2005 Katrina Killian
- 2006 Darci Kistler
- 2007 Nikolaj Hübbe
- 2008 Sean Lavery
- 2009 Violette Verdy
- 2010 Jeffrey Middleton
- 2011 Lisa de Ribère
- 2012 Sean Lavery
- 2013 Peter Martins & Kay Mazzo
- 2014 Dena Abergel (Note: 2014 Wien Awardees)
- 2015 Yvonne Borree
- 2016 Jonathan Stafford
- 2017 Arch Higgins
- 2018 Andrei Kramarevsky
- 2019 Phoebe Higgins
- 2021 Jeffrey Middleton
- 2022 Alla Reznik
- 2023 Sheryl Ware

== Mae L. Wien Awards for Outstanding Promise ==
SAB Students are chosen each year on the basis of their outstanding promise. (Note: Past Awardees)

=== 1987 ===
Source: (Note: City Ballet's School Joins Lincoln Center, Jennifer Dunning, May 5, 1987)

- Robert Lyon
- Rebecca Metzger

=== 1988 ===
- Gretchen Patchell
- Eric Lindemer
- John Selya

=== 1989 ===
- Tanya Gingerich
- Inmaculada Velez
- Arch Higgins
- Jiuchi Kobayashi

=== 1990 ===
- Samantha Allen
- Elizabeth Walker
- Todd Williams

=== 1991 ===
- Megan Bonneau
- Sant'gria Bello

=== 1992 ===
- Emily Coates
- Anna Liceica

=== 1993 ===
- Jennie Somogyi
- Edwaard Liang

=== 1994 ===
- Seth Belliston
- Kristina Fernandez

=== 1995 ===
- Jessy Hendrickson
- Benjamin Millepied

=== 1996 ===
- Darius Crenshaw
- Aesha Ash

=== 1997 ===
- Stephen Hanna
- Aubrey Morgan

=== 1998 ===
- Janie Taylor (Note: Critic's Notebook; Daring to Own The Stage, Jennifer Dunning, June 23, 2000)
- Adam Hendrickson

=== 1999 ===
- Carla Körbes
- Craig Hall
- Seth Orza

=== 2000 ===
- Ashley Bouder
- Amar Ramasar
- Andrew Veyette
- Glenn Keenan

=== 2001 ===
- Megan Fairchild
- Ashlee Knapp
- Benjamin Griffiths
- David Blumenfeld

=== 2002 ===
- Tyler Angle
- Georgina Pazcoguin
- Allen Peiffer
- Jessica Flynn

=== 2003 ===
- Sara Mearns
- Giovanni Villalobos
- Ana Sophia Scheller
- Vincent Paradiso

=== 2004 ===
- Tiler Peck
- Kaitlyn Gilliland
- Daniel Applebaum
- William Lin-Yee

=== 2005 ===
- Robert Fairchild
- Maira Barriga
- Jan Burkhard
- Masahiro Suehara

=== 2006 ===
Source: (Note: The Annual Workshop Performances of the School of American Ballet, John Rockwell, June 7, 2006)

- Kathryn Morgan
- Tabitha Rinko-Gay
- Anthony Huxley
- David Prottas

=== 2007 ===
- Sara Adams
- Kristen Segin
- Cameron Dieck
- Russell Janzen

=== 2008 ===
- Megan Johnson
- Lydia Wellington
- Sam Greenberg
- Michael Tucker

=== 2009 ===
- Emilie Gerrity
- Shoshana Rosenfield
- Ashly Isaacs
- Taylor Stanley

=== 2010 ===
Source: (Note: Youth’s Joy in Movement, Energetic and Unfettered, Roslyn Sulcas, June 10, 2010)

- Jillian Harvey
- Alexander Peters
- Spartak Hoxha
- Elizabeth Wallace

=== 2011 ===
- Angelica Generosa
- Meaghan Dutton-O'Hara
- Harrison Ball
- Peter Walker

=== 2012 ===
Source: (Note: When Youthful Training Gets a Payoff Moment, Gia Kourlas, June 7, 2012)

- Olivia Boisson
- Claire Von Enck
- Harrison Coll
- Silas Farley

=== 2013 ===
- Daniela Aldrich
- Isabella LaFreniere
- Jordan Miller

=== 2014 ===
- Lyrica Blankfein
- Christopher Grant
- Nico Costilow
- Addie Tapp

=== 2015 ===
- Joscelyn Dolson
- Clara Ruf Maldonado
- Dammiel Cruz

=== 2016 ===
- Emma Von Enck
- Christopher D’Ariano
- Ethan Fuller

=== 2017 ===
- Nieve Corrigan
- Gabriella Domini
- Andres Zuniga

=== 2018 ===
- Naomi Corti
- Julianne Kinasiewicz
- Davide Riccardo

=== 2019 ===
- Savannah Durham
- Shelby Tzung
- Cainan Weber

=== 2020 ===
- Ross Allen
- Ruby Lister
- Rommie Tomassini

=== 2021 ===
- Lily Maulsby
- Madeline Rogers
- Schuyler Wijsen

=== 2022 ===
- Henry Berlin
- Alyssa Douglass
- Charlie Klesa

=== 2023 ===
- Oscar Estep
- Natalie Glassie
- Mia Williams

== Mae L. Wien Young Choreographer Awards ==
Peter Martins may award a third to a young choreographer at his discretion.

- 2001 Melissa Barak
- 1996 Christopher Wheeldon
- 1993 Miriam Mahdaviani
- 1991 Robert La Fosse

== See also ==
List of Janice Levin Award dancers
