= Mother Goose (ballet) =

Mother Goose is a ballet made for New York City Ballet's Ravel Festival by balletmaster Jerome Robbins to Maurice Ravel's music and scenario, the Ma Mère l'Oye Suite from 1910, orchestrated by the composer in 1912. The premiere took place on May 22, 1975, at the New York State Theater, Lincoln Center, with costumes by Stanley Simmons and lighting by Jennifer Tipton. At its premiere it bore the French title, which was retained when it was first revived in January 1978 but anglicized by May of that year.

Ma Mère l'Oye was written as a suite of five pieces for piano four hands and later orchestrated and adapted into a ballet by Ravel with the addition of a prelude, an opening scene and four interludes connecting the five original pieces.

== Cast ==
=== Original ===
- Muriel Aasen
- Delia Peters
- Tracy Bennett
- Deborah Koolish
- Colleen Neary
- Richard Hoskinson
- Matthew Giordano
- Jay Jolley
- Daniel Duell

== Reviews ==
- NY Times review, Jennifer Dunning, April 29, 1983
- NY Times review, Jack Anderson, January 6, 1983
- NY Times review, Anna Kisselgoff, June 11, 1990
- NY Times review, Jennifer Dunning, June 27, 1991
- NY Times review, Jennifer Dunning, February 15, 1992
- NY Times review, Gia Kourlas, May 17, 2008
