= In the Wings: Behind the Scenes at the New York City Ballet =

- Author: Kyle Froman
- Language: English
- Genre: Ballet dance
- Publisher: John Wiley & Sons
- Publication date: September 2007
- Pages: 118
- ISBN: 978-0-470-17343-5
- OCLC: 145431666
- Dewey Decimal: 792.809747/1 22
- LC Class: GV1786.N4 F76 2007

In the Wings: Behind the Scenes at the New York City Ballet is a book by Kyle Froman. It was released in September 2007 in hardcover.

The book is told as Kyle's personal diary of a dancer's day: Ch.1 is "10:15AM," Ch. 2 is "11:30AM," Ch. 3 is "2:15," Ch. 4 is "6:15," and Ch. 5 is "Showtime." From morning company class to rehearsal to performance, the text offers intriguing insights into the mental discipline and emotions that come into play in preparing for the show.

The foreword is written by Peter Martins, balletmaster in chief of New York City Ballet. He says of the book, "Here is the New York City Ballet as it really is – the good, the not so good, and the majestically beautiful. It's a true story, and it's told by someone who can honestly claim that he was there."

== Reviews ==
"Mr. Froman writes simply and movingly about life in the corps de ballet. But it's the photographs that display the grim search for perfection in the mirror, the aching muscles, the fear, the camaraderie and the hard-won beauty of ballet." - The New York Times, October 14, 2007

"Kyle Froman brings his stage experience to life in his beautifully photographed new book" - Vanity Fair, November, 2007

"Kyle Froman, senior member of the corps de ballet, shows us his working environment in a charming sequence of photographs. Along with the pictures, he walks us (in a nicely straightforward text) through a day in his NYCB life. We get shots of company class, the massage room, rehearsals, dressing rooms--and some light-flooded midperformance shots, angled from the wings." - Dance Magazine, May, 2008

"An 11-year veteran dancer for the New York City Ballet, Froman here documents life in the corps de ballet in a photo-album an diarylike format. Presenting a day in the life of dancers, he takes readers through the stages of warming up, class, physical therapy, rehearsals, preparation, and, or course, the show. Froman confides, “I can hear the sound of cracking hips and knees. It’s just the beginning of another day of rehearsals with the show looming at eight o’clock.” He communicates the intimate perspective of an experienced dancer (“I just wasn’t expecting to feel so old this quickly”) while offering a private backstage view. His vivid descriptions and photos submerge readers into the atmosphere. An engaging point of view and an attractive layout make this an entertaining read. YAs may also find it a good introduction to the dance world as a possible career. Recommended for all libraries." —Barbara Kundanis, Longmont P.L., CO - Library Journal, January 2008

== See also ==
- Ballet music
- History of ballet
- List of ballets by title
