= Symphony in Three Movements (ballet) =

Ballet choreographed by George Balanchine

- Choreographer: George Balanchine
- Music: Igor Stravinsky
- Premiere: June 18, 1972; New York State Theater
- Original ballet company: New York City Ballet
- Genre: neoclassical ballet

Symphony in Three Movements is a neoclassical ballet choreographed by George Balanchine to the music of the same name by Igor Stravinsky. The ballet was made for the New York City Ballet Stravinsky Festival in 1972, a tribute to the composer following his death. The ballet premiered on June 18, 1972, at the New York State Theater.

== Production ==
Balanchine and Stravinsky had collaborated for many years until the latter's death in 1971. As a tribute to the composer, Balanchine decided to have his company, the New York City Ballet, hold the weeklong Stravinsky Festival. The festival included 22 premieres, seven by Balanchine. One of Stravinsky's works chosen for the festival was Symphony in Three Movements, which was written during the Second World War for different aborted film projects, though he admitted it referenced the war.

Despite its complex choreography, intricate music and large cast, Balanchine completed the ballet in a week due to the pressures of the festival. Gordon Boelzner, the company's pianist and associate conductor, recalled, "[Balanchine] just tossed off steps without hesitation." He added, "He threw whole chunks of choreography at the dancers. I couldn't make head or tail of what was going on. Then Balanchine took one afternoon to clean it all up, and all of a sudden it came absolutely clear." Edward Villella, one of the original cast members, called Stravinsky's score "the single most complicated score I had ever danced to." He added, "During rehearsals, despite all my experience dancing Stravinsky, I couldn't really hear the music and couldn't count it." Balanchine's assistant Barbara Hagan recalled Sara Leland, another original cast member and a newly promoted principal dancer, "was a quick learner", while "Balanchine really struggled with Symphony with regard to tempos", therefore Balanchine used Leland to demonstrate the steps to the corps de ballet.

After she retired, Leland, known for her ability to remember choreography, went on to stage and coach ballets, including Symphony in Three Movements. Christine Redpath, a New York City Ballet repertory director who would also stage the ballet, noted Leland had memorized all the difficult counts.

== Choreography ==
The first movement begins with sixteen women in a diagonal line, before the six principal dancers and five soloist couples enter. Critic Zoe Anderson described, "Dancers leap on, followed by small entourages, or spin their way among the jogging corps." Villella noted dancing to the first movement was "the biggest musical challenge I had ever faced".

The second movement is a pas de deux. Anderson called this movement "both sensuous and remote". She added, "Although there is some partnering, the dancers keep an emotional and sometimes physical distance."

The full cast returns for the third and final movement. Villella wrote, "The movement for everyone here is aggressive, mysterious and frightening." The New York Times critic Anna Kisselgoff noted, "Stravinsky's allusion to an Allied victory in World War II is not to be taken literally. But the triumphant note is translated in the massed groupings on stage: Dancers frozen in semaphores and abstractions of warriors at the ready."

== Original cast ==
The principal dancers at the premiere of Symphony in Three Movements were:

- Sara Leland
- Marnee Morris
- Lynda Yourth
- Helgi Tomasson
- Edward Villella
- Robert Weiss

== Performances ==
Symphony in Three Movements premiered on June 18, 1972, at the New York State Theater. Other companies that have performed the ballet include the San Francisco Ballet and Boston Ballet.
