= Rosemary Dunleavy =

American ballerina

Rosemary Dunleavy (born New York City) studied ballet with Bella Malinka and Nina Popova at the High School of Performing Arts. After graduation she attended the School of American Ballet and in 1961 joined New York City Ballet. She performed in the premieres of George Balanchine's A Midsummer Night's Dream, Harlequinade, Don Quixote and Jewels. In 1971 she retired from dancing and became Balanchine's full-time assistant balletmistress, and since 1983 she has been City Ballet's balletmistress.
