= Duo Concertant =

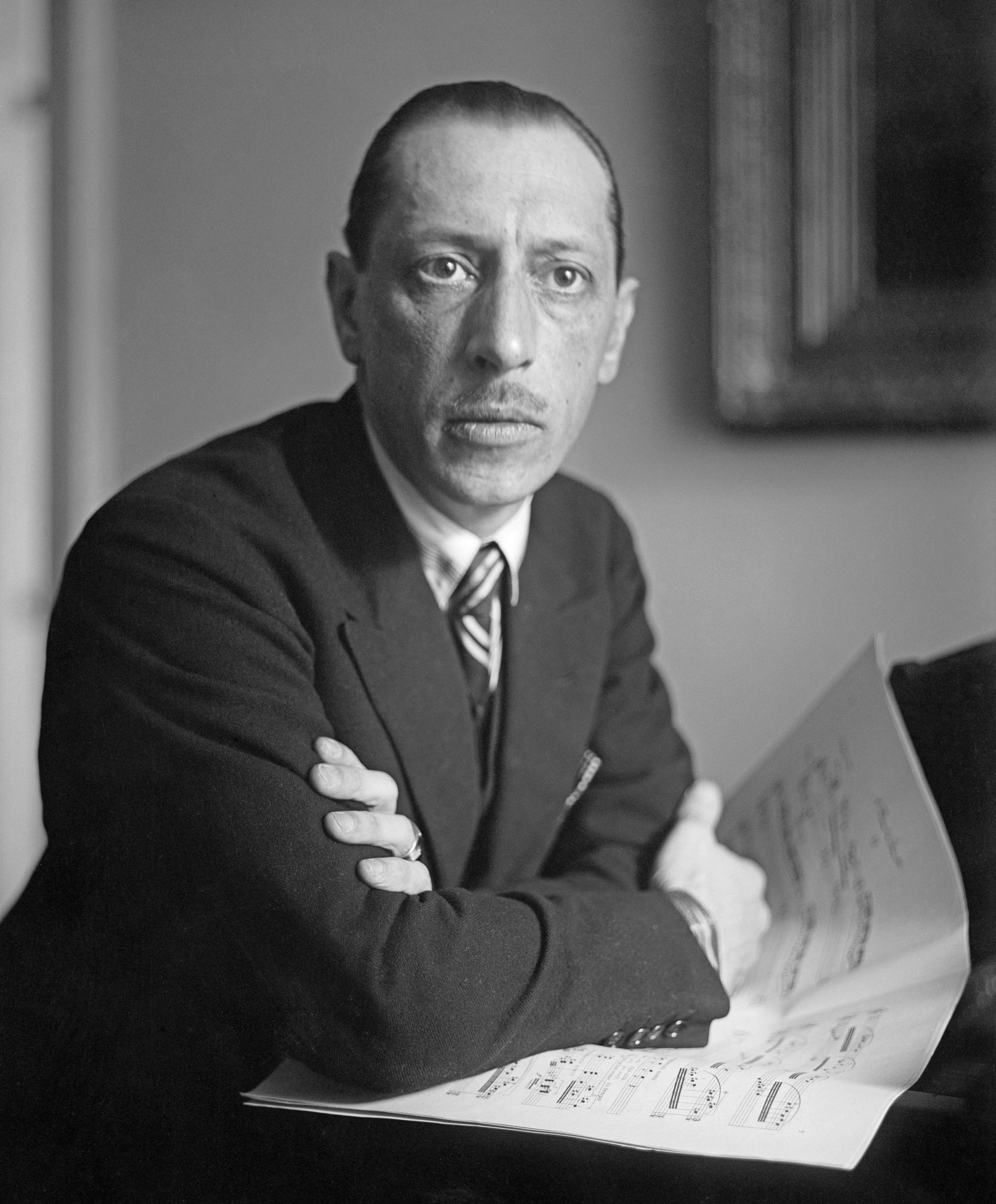
Igor Stravinsky in the 1920s

Duo Concertant is a 1932 composition for violin and piano by Igor Stravinsky. The impetus for this piece came from neo-classical literature and this is reflected in the names of the movements:

1. Cantilène
2. Eclogue 1
3. Eclogue 2
4. Gigue
5. Dithyrambe

Stravinsky dedicated Duo Concertant to Samuel Dushkin, a well-known violinist he met in 1931. The composer premiered the work with Dushkin in Berlin in 1932, and the pair gave recitals together across Europe for the next several years.

In 1972, George Balanchine choreographed Duo Concertant to Stravinsky's score for the New York City Ballet Stravinsky Festival.
