= Sean Lavery (dancer) =

Sean Lavery (August 16, 1956 in Harrisburg, Pennsylvania – February 26, 2018 in Palm Springs, California) was a former principal dancer, balletmaster, and assistant to the balletmaster in chief at New York City Ballet. He was a répétiteur for the George Balanchine Trust and a former faculty member at the School of American Ballet.

== Early life and dance career ==
Lavery grew up in Harrisburg, Pennsylvania, and studied at Central Pennsylvania Youth Ballet as a young boy before moving to New York to train with Barbara Fallis and Richard Thomas. He joined the San Francisco Ballet in 1973 and the Frankfurt Opera Ballet in 1975, where he was promoted to principal dancer. In 1976, Lavery returned to New York to join New York City Ballet at the invitation of George Balanchine. A year later he made his major role debut as Titania's Cavalier in A Midsummer Night's Dream followed in quick succession by promotion to soloist in early 1978 and to principal dancer later that year.

In 1986 at the age of 30, while partnering Patricia McBride during a performance of Who Cares?, Lavery would suffer an injury that proved catastrophic. Due to a then unknown tumor on his spine, this injury would cause Lavery extreme neurological damage which led to the end of his career as a dancer. At the time Lavery carried a bulk of the repertory at City Ballet, giving up to 8 performances a week during the company's season. Despite lacking the proper finances to pay for his surgeries or rehabilitation, Lavery was supported emotionally and financially by the company and its Dancers' Emergency Fund which was created by Jerome Robbins in 1980 specifically to assist dancers in the troupe waylaid by unexpected medical costs or personal losses. As a well beloved star dancer, Lavery's recovery was extensively covered by The New York Times in an article titled A Dancer's Nightmare.

== Post dance career ==
Following his recovery, Lavery would visit his alma mater at San Francisco Ballet to attend the opening of its official ballet school where he would teach a series of successful classes. Returning to New York, he continued teaching at David Howard's school to great acclaim. Upon hearing of Lavery's classes, City Ballet's co-ballet master-in-chief Peter Martins invited him to teach company class. Following these initial classes, Lavery was appointed company teacher and later on balletmaster to the company and assistant to the ballet master in chief, specifically as the right-hand man of Peter Martins. During this time, he would choreograph his version of Romeo and Juliet for the company and serve as a faculty member of School of American Ballet, where he re-staged his original 1990 ballet Twinkliana for the SAB workshop in June 2007.

Lavery retired from City Ballet and SAB in the fall of 2011. In 2012, in recognition of his service to SAB, he was awarded the Mae L. Wien Faculty Award for Distinguished Service.

Following his retirement Lavery moved to Palm Springs, California, where he died February 26, 2018, after a brief illness.
