= New York City Ballet =

American ballet company

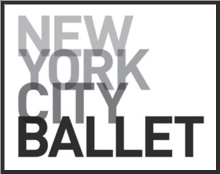

General information
- Name: New York City Ballet
- Previous names: American Ballet; Ballet Caravan; American Ballet Caravan; The Ballet Society
- Year founded: 1948; 78 years ago
- Founders: George Balanchine; Lincoln Kirstein
- Founding choreographers: George Balanchine; Jerome Robbins
- Principal venue: David H. Koch Theater Lincoln Center for the Performing Arts New York City; Saratoga Performing Arts Center, Saratoga Springs, New York
- Website: www.nycballet.com

Artistic staff
- Artistic director: Jonathan Stafford (and Wendy Whelan, Associate Artistic Director)
- Ballet master: Rosemary Dunleavy
- Music director: Andrew Litton

Other
- Orchestra: The New York City Ballet Orchestra
- Official school: School of American Ballet
- Associated schools: New York Choreographic Institute
- Formation: Principal Dancer; Soloist; Corps de Ballet

New York City Ballet (NYCB) is a ballet company founded in 1948 by choreographer George Balanchine and Lincoln Kirstein. Balanchine and Jerome Robbins are considered the founding choreographers of the company. Léon Barzin was the company's first music director. City Ballet grew out of earlier troupes: the Producing Company of the School of American Ballet, 1934; the American Ballet, 1935, and Ballet Caravan, 1936, which merged into American Ballet Caravan, 1941; and directly from the Ballet Society, 1946.

== History ==
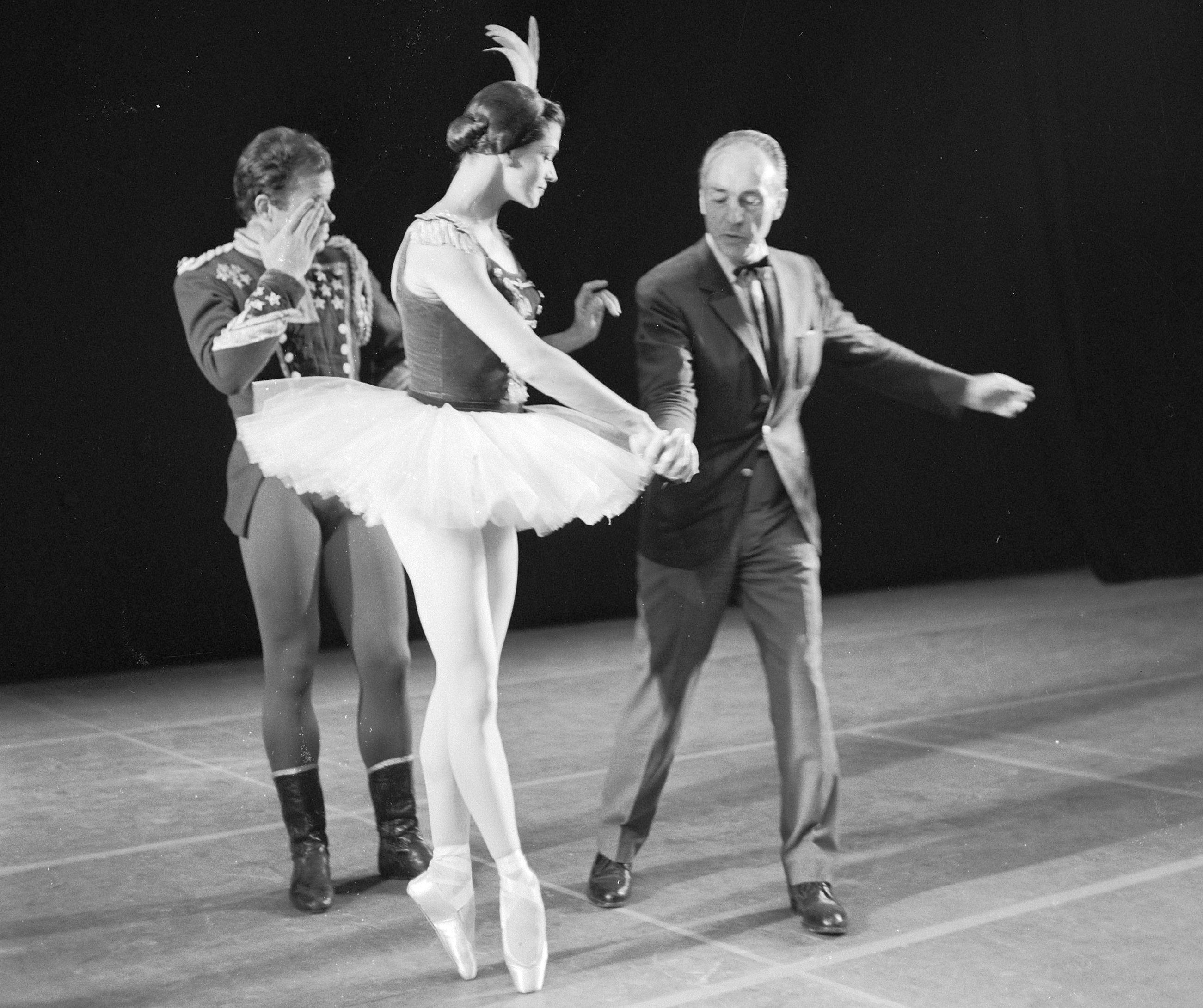
New York City Ballet in Amsterdam with George Balanchine

In a 1946 letter, Kirstein stated, "The only justification I have is to enable Balanchine to do exactly what he wants to do in the way he wants to do it." He served as the company's General Director from 1946 to 1989, developing and sustaining it by his organizational and fundraising abilities.

The company was named New York City Ballet in 1948 when it became resident at City Center of Music and Drama. Its success was marked by its move to the New York State Theater, now David H. Koch Theater, designed by Philip Johnson to Balanchine's specifications. City Ballet became the first ballet company in the United States to have two permanent venue engagements: one at Lincoln Center's David H. Koch Theater on 63rd Street in Manhattan, and another at the Saratoga Performing Arts Center, in Saratoga Springs, New York. The School of American Ballet (S.A.B.), which Balanchine founded, is the training school of the company.

After the company's move to the State Theater, Balanchine's creativity as a choreographer flourished. He created works that were the basis of the company's repertory until his death in 1983. He worked closely with choreographer Jerome Robbins, who resumed his connection with the company in 1969 after having produced works for Broadway.

NYCB still has the largest repertoire by far of any American ballet company. It often stages 60 ballets or more in its winter and spring seasons at Lincoln Center each year, and 20 or more in its summer season in Saratoga Springs. City Ballet has performed The Nutcracker, Romeo and Juliet, A Midsummer Night's Dream, and many more. City Ballet has trained and developed many great dancers since its formation. Many dancers with already developed reputations have also joined the ballet as principal dancers:

- Merrill Ashley
- Mikhail Baryshnikov
- Ashley Bouder
- Jacques d'Amboise
- Suzanne Farrell
- Melissa Hayden
- Sterling Hyltin
- Jillana
- Allegra Kent
- Gelsey Kirkland
- Tanaquil LeClercq
- Nicholas Magallanes
- Peter Martins
- Nilas Martins
- Patricia McBride
- Sara Mearns
- Monique Meunier
- Arthur Mitchell
- Francisco Moncion
- Kyra Nichols
- Tiler Peck
- Unity Phelan
- Teresa Reichlen
- Jock Soto
- Maria Tallchief
- Edward Villella

=== Salute to Italy ===
In 1960, Balanchine mounted City Ballet's Salute to Italy with premieres of Monumentum pro Gesualdo and Variations from Don Sebastian (called the Donizetti Variations since 1961), as well as performances of his La Sonnambula and Lew Christensen's Con Amore. The performance was repeated in 1968.

=== Stravinsky Festival ===
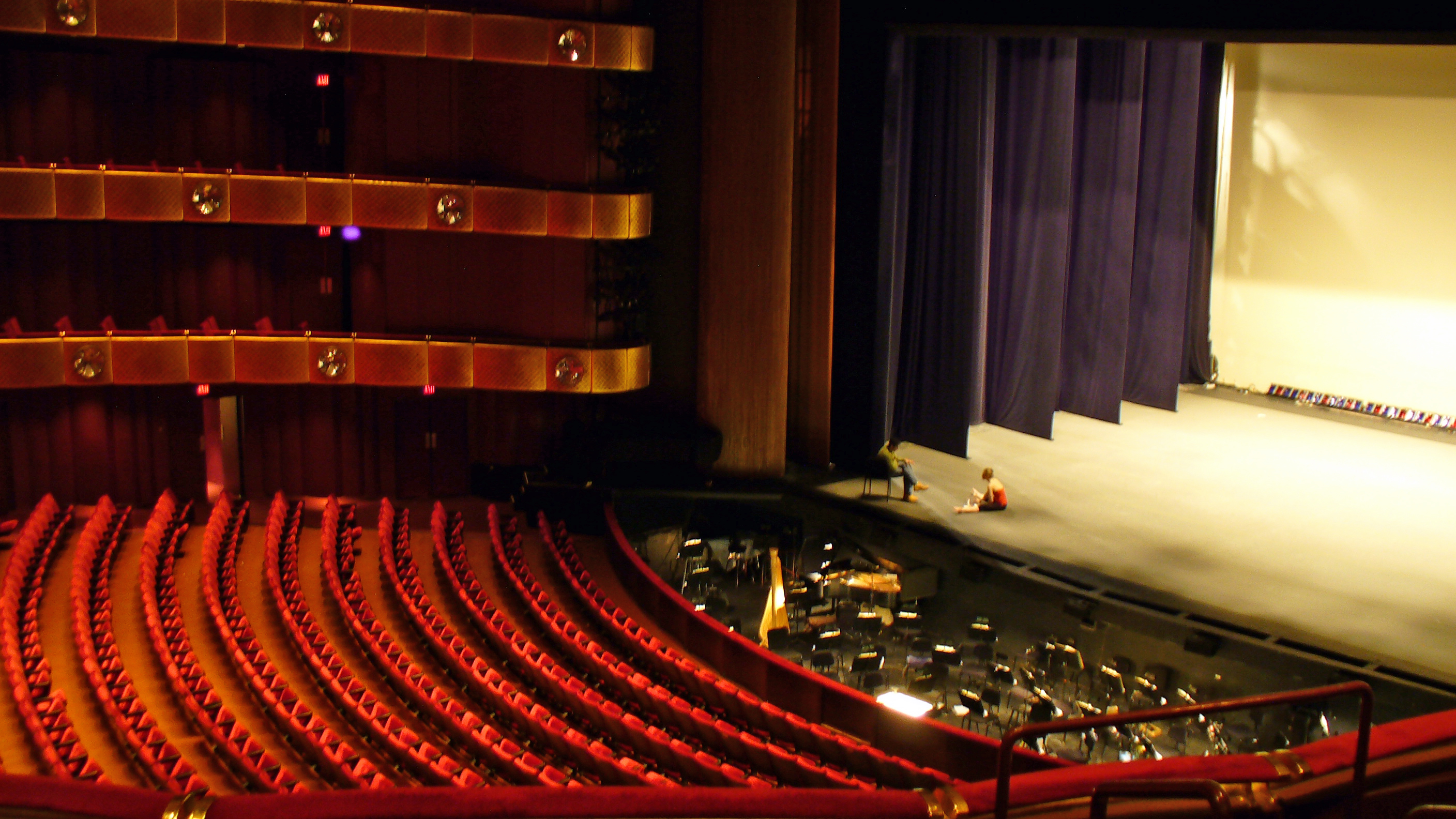
David H. Koch Theater, pre-renovation

In 1972, Balanchine offered an eight-day tribute to the composer, his great collaborator, who had died the year before. His programs included twenty-two new works of his own dances, plus works by choreographers Todd Bolender, John Clifford, Lorca Massine, Jerome Robbins, Richard Tanner, and John Taras, as well as repertory ballets by Balanchine and Robbins. Balanchine created Symphony in Three Movements, Duo Concertant, and Violin Concerto for the occasion. He and Robbins co-choreographed and performed in Pulcinella. Balanchine had produced an earlier Stravinsky festival in 1937 as balletmaster of the American Ballet while engaged by the Metropolitan Opera. The composer conducted the April 27th premiere of Card Party.

=== Ravel Festival ===
In 1975, Balanchine paid his respects to the French composer Maurice Ravel with a two-week Hommage à Ravel. Balanchine, Robbins, Jacques d'Amboise, and Taras made sixteen new ballets for the occasion. Repertory ballets were performed as well. High points included Balanchine's Le Tombeau de Couperin and Robbins' Mother Goose.

=== Tschaikovsky Festival ===
In 1981, Balanchine planned a two-week NYCB festival honoring the Russian composer Peter Ilyitch Tschaikovsky. Balanchine, Joseph Duell, d'Amboise, Peter Martins, Robbins, and Taras created twelve new dances. In addition to presenting these and repertory ballets, Balanchine re-choreographed his Mozartiana from 1933. Philip Johnson and John Burgee's stage setting of translucent tubing was designed to be hung and lit in different architectural configurations throughout the entire festival.

=== Stravinsky Centennial Celebration ===
In 1982, Balanchine organized a centennial celebration in honor of his long-time collaborator Igor Stravinsky, during which the City Ballet performed twenty-five ballets set to the composer's music. Balanchine made three new ballets, Tango, Élégie, and Persephone, and a new version of Variations. The choreographer died the following year. Balanchine's 50th Anniversary Celebration was held by the company in 2002.

=== New York State Theater 20-Year Celebration ===
On April 26, 1984, NYCB celebrated the 20th anniversary of the New York State Theater. The program started with Igor Stravinsky's Fanfare for a New Theater, followed by Stravinsky's arrangement of The Star-Spangled Banner. The ballets included three of Balanchine's works, Serenade, Stravinsky Violin Concerto, and Sonatine; and Jerome Robbins' Afternoon of a Faun. The performers included Maria Calegari, Kyra Nichols, Heather Watts, Leonid Kozlov, Afshin Mofid, Patricia McBride, Helgi Tomasson, Karin von Aroldingen, Lourdes Lopez, Bart Cook, and Joseph Duell.

=== Peter Martins ===
After Balanchine's death in 1983, Peter Martins was selected as balletmaster of the company. After 30 years, Martins was judged to have maintained the New York City Ballet's financial security and the musicality and performance level of the dancers, but he has not emphasized the Balanchine style to the extent that many observers expected he would. Martins retired from his position in 2018.

==== American Music Festival ====
For the company's 40th anniversary, Martins held an American Music Festival, having commissioned dances from choreographers Laura Dean, Eliot Feld, William Forsythe, Lar Lubovitch, Paul Taylor. He also presented ballets by George Balanchine and Robbins. The programs included world premieres of more than twenty dances. Martins contributed Barber Violin Concerto, Black and White, The Chairman Dances, A Fool for You, Fred and George, Sophisticated Lady, Tanzspiel, Tea-Rose, and The Waltz Project.

=== Jerome Robbins celebration ===
A major component of the Spring 2008 season was a celebration of Jerome Robbins; major revivals were mounted of the following ballets:

- 2 and 3 Part Inventions
- Afternoon of a Faun
- Andantino
- Antique Epigraphs
- Brahms/Handel
- Brandenburg
- The Cage
- The Concert
- Dances at a Gathering
- Dybbuk
- Fancy Free
- Fanfare
- Four Bagatelles
- The Four Seasons
- Glass Pieces
- The Goldberg Variations
- I'm Old Fashioned
- In G Major
- In Memory of ...
- In the Night
- Interplay
- Ives, Songs
- NY Export: Opus Jazz
- Les Noces
- Opus 19/The Dreamer
- Other Dances
- Piano Pieces
- A Suite of Dances
- Watermill
- West Side Story Suite

=== Dancers' Choice ===
Friday, June 27, 2008, the first Dancers' Choice benefit was held for the Dancers' Emergency Fund. The program was initiated by Peter Martins, conceived and supervised by principal dancer Jonathan Stafford, assisted by Kyle Froman, Craig Hall, Amanda Hankes, Adam Hendrickson, Ask la Cour, Henry Seth, and Daniel Ulbricht, and consisted of:

- Beethoven Romance
- Flit of Fury/The Monarch

and excerpts from:

- Ecstatic Orange
- Jewels
  - Emeralds
  - Rubies
- Square Dance
- Interplay
- Dances at a Gathering
- Glass Pieces
- Union Jack
- Stars and Stripes
- Mercurial Manoeuvres
- Symphony in C

On June 14, 2009, the second Dancers' Choice benefit was held at a special evening performance. The program included Sleeping Beauty and Union Jack. The program was supervised by principal dancer Jenifer Ringer.

== Programming ==
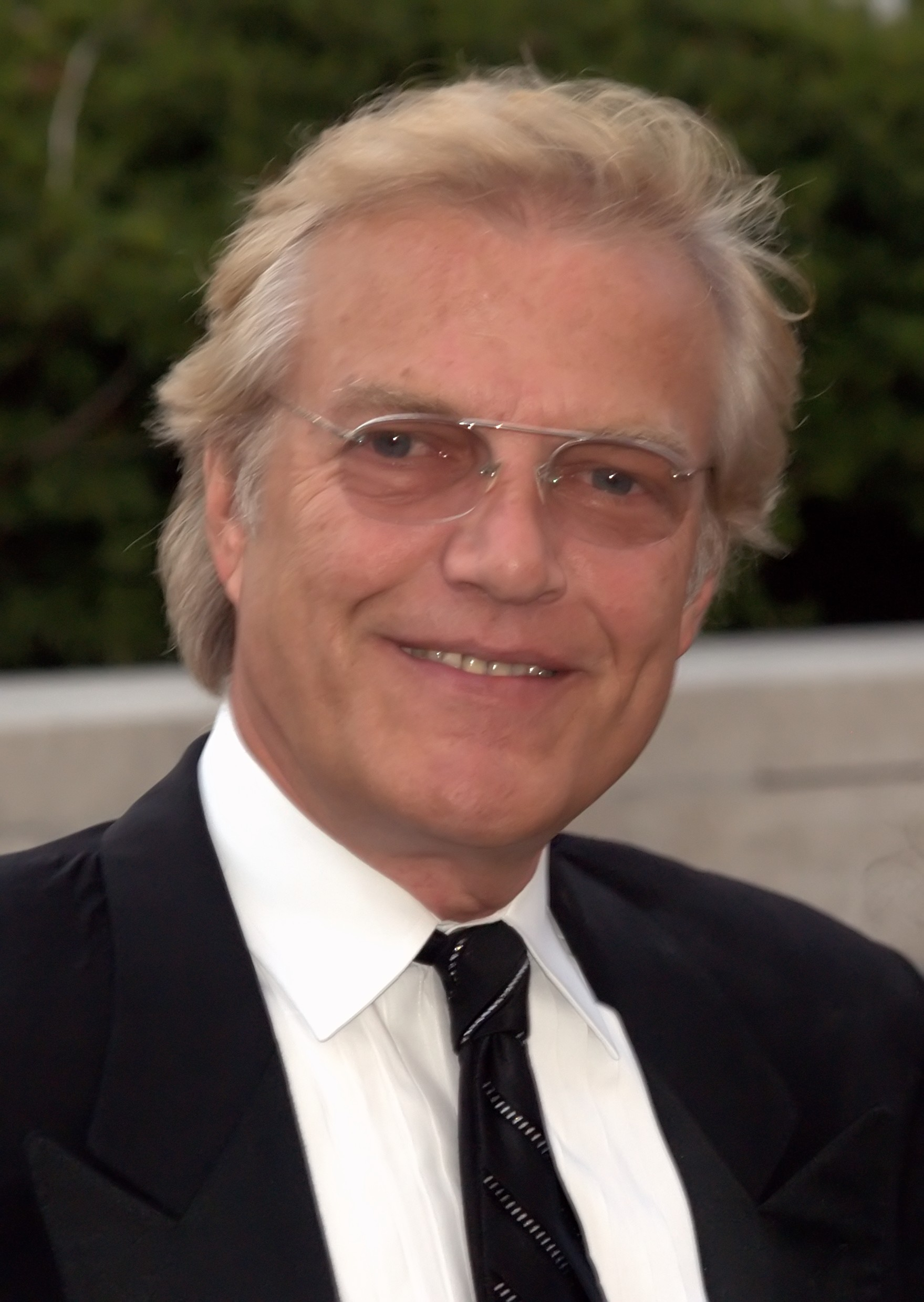
Peter Martins, former NYCB artistic director, in 2009

NYCB performs fall, winter and spring repertory seasons at the David H. Koch Theater at Lincoln Center as well as George Balanchine's Nutcracker during November and December; they have a summer residency at the Saratoga Performing Arts Center and regularly tour internationally.

Introductory talks about a current performance, called First Position Discussions, are held before some performances or during some intervals in the fourth ring, house right; the docents are volunteers and include laymen as well as former dancers. Hour-long Inside NYCB events explore the history and inner workings of the company through performance and discussion, often with dancers and artistic staff.

Other public programs include Family Saturdays, one-hour interactive programs for children 5 and up; Children's Workshops and In Motion Workshops, pre-performance explorations of the music, movement, and themes of a ballet featured in the matinee performance for children ages 5–8 and 9–11, respectively; and Ballet Essentials, a 75-minute informal ballet class for adults ages 21 and up with little to no prior dance experience. These programs are all facilitated by NYCB dancers.

== $30 for 30 and Fourth Ring Society/Society NYCB ==
New York City Ballet offers tickets for $30 to select performances for patrons ages 13 to 30 at the box office, or online or by phone with an account; sales for each performance week (Tue. evening through Sun. matinee) begin at 10:00 a.m. on the Monday of that week.

New York City Ballet's Fourth Ring Society offered discounted tickets to all shows in the theater's Fourth Ring for a small annual fee. This program was closed to new members in 2011 and renamed Society NYCB to reflect an expanded offering of discounted seats in all sections of the theater, although over time a few ballet programs (e.g., Nutcracker) and individual dates became unavailable.

== New York Choreographic Institute ==
City Ballet's Choreographic Institute was founded by Irene Diamond and Peter Martins in 2000. It has three main programmatic programs: choreographic sessions, providing choreographers with dancers and studio space; fellowship initiatives, annual awards in support of an emerging choreographer affiliated with a ballet company; and choreographic forums, symposia and round-table discussions on choreography, music, and design elements.

== Dancers ==
=== Principal Dancers ===
| Name | Nationality | Training | Joined NYCB | Promoted to Principal |
|---|---|---|---|---|
| Tyler Angle | United States | Allegheny Ballet Academy School of American Ballet | 2004 | 2009 |
| Gilbert Bolden III | United States | Idyllwild Arts Academy The Rock School for Dance Education School of American Ballet | 2017 | 2025 |
| Chun Wai Chan | China | Guangzhou Art School (China) Houston Ballet Academy (Houston Ballet II) | 2021 | 2022 |
| Jovani Furlan | Brazil | Bolshoi Theater School (Brazil) Miami City Ballet School | 2019 | 2022 |
| Emilie Gerrity | United States | Betty Jean's Dance Studio New Paltz School of Ballet School of American Ballet | 2010 | 2023 |
| Joseph Gordon | United States | Phoenix Dance Academy School of American Ballet | 2012 | 2018 |
| Anthony Huxley | United States | San Francisco Ballet School Contra Costa Ballet School School of American Ballet | 2007 | 2015 |
| Isabella LaFreniere | United States | Southold Dance Theatre Joffrey Academy of Dance School of American Ballet | 2014 | 2023 |
| Sara Mearns | United States | Calvert-Brodie School of Dance School of North Carolina Dance Theatre South Carolina Governor's School for the Arts and Humanities School of American Ballet | 2004 | 2008 |
| Roman Mejia | United States | Mejia Ballet Academy School of American Ballet | 2017 | 2023 |
| Miriam Miller | United States | University of Iowa Youth Ballet City Ballet of Iowa School of American Ballet | 2016 | 2025 |
| Mira Nadon | United States | Inland Pacific Ballet Academy of Montclair School of American Ballet | 2018 | 2023 |
| Tiler Peck | United States | Bakersfield Dance Company Conjunctive Point Westside School of Ballet School of American Ballet | 2005 | 2009 |
| Unity Phelan | United States | Princeton Ballet School School of American Ballet | 2012 | 2021 |
| Taylor Stanley | United States | The Rock School for Dance Education School of American Ballet | 2010 | 2016 |
| Ryan Tomash | Canada | Canada’s National Ballet School | 2025 | 2026 |
| Daniel Ulbricht | United States | Judith Lee Johnson Studio of Dance Les Jeunes Danseurs Chautauqua Summer Dance Program School of American Ballet | 2001 | 2007 |
| Emma Von Enck | United States | Royal School of Ballet Cleveland School of Dance Cleveland Ballet Conservatory School of American Ballet | 2017 | 2024 |
| Peter Walker | United States | Gulfshore Ballet School of American Ballet | 2012 | 2022 |
| Indiana Woodward | France | Yuri Grigoriev School of Ballet School of American Ballet | 2012 | 2021 |

=== Soloists ===
| Name | Nationality | Training | Joined NYCB | Promoted to Soloist |
|---|---|---|---|---|
| Victor Abreu | United States | New York Theatre Ballet School of American Ballet | 2019 | 2025 |
| Sara Adams | United States | Mid-Cape Ballet Academy Boston Ballet School School of American Ballet | 2009 | 2017 |
| Dominika Afanasenkov | United States | Academy of Ballet Arts (Florida) Next Generation Ballet School of American Ballet | 2022 | 2025 |
| India Bradley | United States | The Link School of Arts Academy of Russian Classical Ballet Dance Theatre of Harlem School of American Ballet | 2017 | 2025 |
| Preston Chamblee | United States | Raleigh School of Ballet International Ballet Academy (North Carolina) School of American Ballet | 2015 | 2022 |
| Harrison Coll | United States | School of American Ballet | 2013 | 2018 |
| David Gabriel | United States | Glenwood Dance Academy Central Pennsylvania Youth Ballet School of American Ballet | 2021 | 2024 |
| Naomi Corti | France | L’école de Danse Marie-France Ceschel California Dance Theater School of American Ballet | 2019 | 2025 |
| Meaghan Dutton-O'Hara | United States | Frederick School of Classical Ballet School of American Ballet | 2012 | 2026 |
| Owen Flacke | United States | Walnut Hill School for the Arts Boston Ballet School School of American Ballet | 2023 | 2026 |
| Ashley Hod | United States | Great Neck School of Dance School of American Ballet | 2013 | 2022 |
| Emily Kikta | United States | Thomas Studio of Performing Arts Ballet Academy of Pittsburgh School of American Ballet | 2011 | 2022 |
| Alec Knight | Australia | The Australian Ballet School School of American Ballet | 2015 | 2024 |
| Ashley Laracey | United States | Carty Academy of Theater Dance Sarasota Ballet of Florida School of American Ballet | 2003 | 2013 |
| Jules Mabie | United States | Academy of Dance, Music & Theatre School of American Ballet | 2018 | 2024 |
| Mary Thomas MacKinnon | United States | Mobile Ballet School of American Ballet | 2018 | 2025 |
| Olivia MacKinnon | United States | Mobile Ballet School of American Ballet | 2013 | 2023 |
| Alexa Maxwell | United States | Deanne's Dance Studio Minnesota Dance Theater Central Pennsylvania Youth Ballet School of American Ballet | 2013 | 2023 |
| Erica Pereira | United States | Ballet Academy East School of American Ballet | 2007 | 2009 |
| Davide Riccardo | Italy | Istituto Regional Della Danza Opera Ballet School School of American Ballet | 2018 | 2023 |
| Aaron Sanz | Spain | C.P.D. Carmen Amaya (Madrid) School of American Ballet | 2012 | 2018 |
| KJ Takahashi | United States | Ballet Academy of Texas Mejia Ballet International Ballet Tech School of American Ballet | 2021 | 2023 |
| Sebastian Villarini-Velez | Puerto Rico | School for the Performing Arts (Puerto Rico) School of American Ballet | 2013 | 2018 |
| Kloe Walker | United States | Central Pennsylvania Youth Ballet School of American Ballet | 2024 | 2026 |
| Andres Zuniga | Mexico | Danza Tellez The Rock School for Dance Education School of American Ballet | 2018 | 2025 |

== Artistic staff ==
The following was the artistic staff as of 2016 (except dancers, who are listed at List of New York City Ballet dancers):

=== Senior repertory director ===
- Rosemary Dunleavy

=== Repertory directors ===
- Jean-Pierre Frohlich
- Gonzalo Garcia
- Craig Hall
- Lisa Jackson
- Glenn Keenan
- Rebecca Krohn
- Christine Redpath
- Kathleen Tracey

=== Guest teachers ===
- Espen Giljane
- Arch Higgins
- Darci Kistler
- Andrei Kramarevsky

=== Children's repertory director ===
- Dena Abergel

==== Associate children's repertory director ====
- Arch Higgins

=== Resident choreographer and artistic advisor ===
- Justin Peck

=== Artist in residence ===
- Alexei Ratmansky

== The New York City Ballet Orchestra ==
The 66-member NYCB Orchestra is an important symphonic institution in its own right, having played for virtually all of the thousands of performances NYCB has given over the decades. It is one of the most versatile orchestras in the world, on any given week performing perhaps three or four times the repertoire that another symphony might be expected to do. Principal players of the orchestra also perform the majority of the concertos, other solos, and chamber music in the NYCB repertory as well. The orchestra accompanies the ballet on all of its North American tours, and while the ballet uses local orchestras on its international tours, members of the NYCB Orchestra often go along as soloists or extras.

Besides the members of the orchestra, the NYCB has six pianists on full-time staff. They all perform in the pit with the orchestra on a regular basis.

The NYCB Orchestra also occasionally accompanies dance companies from other cities at the Koch Theater. These have included the Australian Ballet in the Spring 2012, and the San Francisco Ballet in the Fall 2013.

In January 2019, it was announced that an anonymous donor had funded the renaming of the orchestra pit as the "Stravinsky Orchestra Pit".

=== Music directors ===
- Léon Barzin (1948–1963)
- Robert Irving (1963–1989)
- Gordon Boelzner (1989–2000)
- Andrea Quinn (2001–2006)
- Fayçal Karoui (2006–2012)
- Andrew Litton (2015–present)

=== Staff conductors ===
- Clotilde Otranto
- Andrews Sill (acting Music Director, 2012–2014; Associate Music Director 2014–present)

=== Other conductors of note ===
- Hugo Fiorato (retired 2004) (Conductor Emeritus)
- Maurice Kaplow (retired 2010 as Principal Conductor)

== Controversies ==
=== Misconduct allegations against Peter Martins ===
In December 2017, Martins took a leave of absence from the New York City Ballet following an allegation of sexual misconduct made against him. Five dancers of the New York City Ballet later told the New York Times that Martins had verbally or physically abused them; Martins denied engaging in any misconduct. Martins retired from the City Ballet on January 1, 2018. An independent inquiry commissioned by NYCB and SAB and led by employment-law attorney Barbara E. Hoey did not corroborate the allegations of harassment or violence made against Martins, according to a joint statement issued by the company and school. The report itself was not made public.

=== Nude photos allegation ===
In September 2018, Alexandra Waterbury, an ex-girlfriend of NYCB principal dancer Chase Finlay, began a civil action in New York County Supreme Court against Finlay, principal dancers Amar Ramasar and Zachary Catazaro, NYCB patron Jared Longhitano, New York City Ballet and SAB. Her lawsuit claimed harm by Finlay for allegedly taking and sharing sexually explicit photos and videos of Waterbury without her knowledge or consent, and by Ramasar, Catazaro, Longhitano, NYCB and SAB for allegedly contributing to that harm in various ways.

All defendants disputed key factual allegations made in the complaint as well as their liability as a matter of law; they all filed motions to dismiss. Waterbury's lawsuit led to Finlay's resignation and the firing of Ramasar and Catazaro. In April 2019, an arbitrator ordered Ramasar and Catazaro reinstated; Catazaro decided not to rejoin the company. Although there were no public reports of a settlement agreement, in February 2023, Waterbury agreed to withdraw "with prejudice" (i.e., permanently) all claims against NYCB and Finlay "without costs or attorneys' fees to any party."

== See also ==
- In the Wings: Behind the Scenes at the New York City Ballet, 2007 book
- List of productions of Swan Lake derived from its 1895 revival

== Bibliography ==
- Balanchine. A Biography, Bernard Taper. Collier Books Edition.
- The New York City Ballet. Thirty Years, Lincoln Kirstein.
- The New York City Ballet, Anatole Chujoy. Knopf. 1953.
- Farrell, Suzanne; Bentley, Toni (1990). Holding On To The Air. New York: Summit Books. ISBN 0-671-68222-9.
- Alexander, Shana (May 7, 1985). Nutcracker. New York NY: Doubleday. ISBN 978-0385192682.
