= August Zarnack =

German preacher and teacher (1777-1827)

- Born: September 21, 1777; Mehmke, Saxony
- Died: June 11, 1827 (aged 49)
- Occupations: Teacher; Preacher

Joachim August Christian Zarnack (September 21, 1777 - June 11, 1827) was a German preacher, teacher, and collector of German folk music. He found, arranged, and published a number of collections of such music from his travels and research.

== Biography ==
Zarnack was born in Mehmke, Saxony to a preacher. In 1795, he left home to receive theological training at a seminary in Halle, Saxony at the University of Halle, and became a preacher himself. In 1805, Zarnack moved to Beeskow to be the town church's second preacher, and also became teacher at a girls' school. In 1815, after the end of the Napoleonic Wars and after a major expansion of Brandenburg-Prussia, Zarnack was appointed director of education at the Royal Military Orphanage in Potsdam, originally intended for the children of slain soldiers. In 1822, Zarnack was involved in a scandal after accusations by an orphan girl under his care, and was temporarily suspended. He died in Potsdam in 1827.

Zarnack was best known after his death for his work in music and compilation of folk music. He put lyrics to a version of O Tannenbaum that was more a love song (Liebeslieder). Zarnack's version was published in 1819–1820. Ernst Anschütz would write the most famous and prominent version of O Tannenbaum in 1824 that is still sung today. Anschütz's version was a Christmas carol rather than a love song, however. Anschütz kept Zarnack's first verse, and thus Zarnack is usually partially credited for the inspiration of the carol.

== Works ==
=== Books ===
- Deutsche Volkslieder Band I, Berlin 1818 (Full text); Band II, Berlin 1820 (Full text)
- Weisenbuch zu den Volksliedern für Volksschulen, 2 Bände 1819/20 (Full text at Google Books)
- Deutsche Sprichwörter zu Verstandesübungen für die Schulen bearbeitet. Maurer, Berlin 1820 (Full text from University of Düsseldorf)
- Aehrenkranz deutscher Volksmährchen. Mittler, Berlin/Posen/Bromberg 1828 (Full text at Google Books)

=== Songs ===
- "Ich hab die Nacht geträumet"
- "O Tannenbaum"
