= Liebeslieder =

Liebeslieder (German, lit. "love songs") may refer to love songs in general, or to these specific works:

- Liebeslieder, Op. 114 (Strauss), a waltz by Johann Strauss II
- Liebeslieder Walzer (Brahms Opus 52), waltzes by Johannes Brahms for four-hands piano and vocal quartet
- Neue Liebeslieder, Opus 65, a sequel to Brahms' Opus 52, for piano and voices
- Liebeslieder Walzer (ballet), George Balanchine's ballet set to the two Brahms works
- Liebeslieder Singers, the chorus in Stephen Sondheim's A Little Night Music
