= Great Military Orphanage =

Coordinates: 52°23′46.77″N 13°3′5.72″E

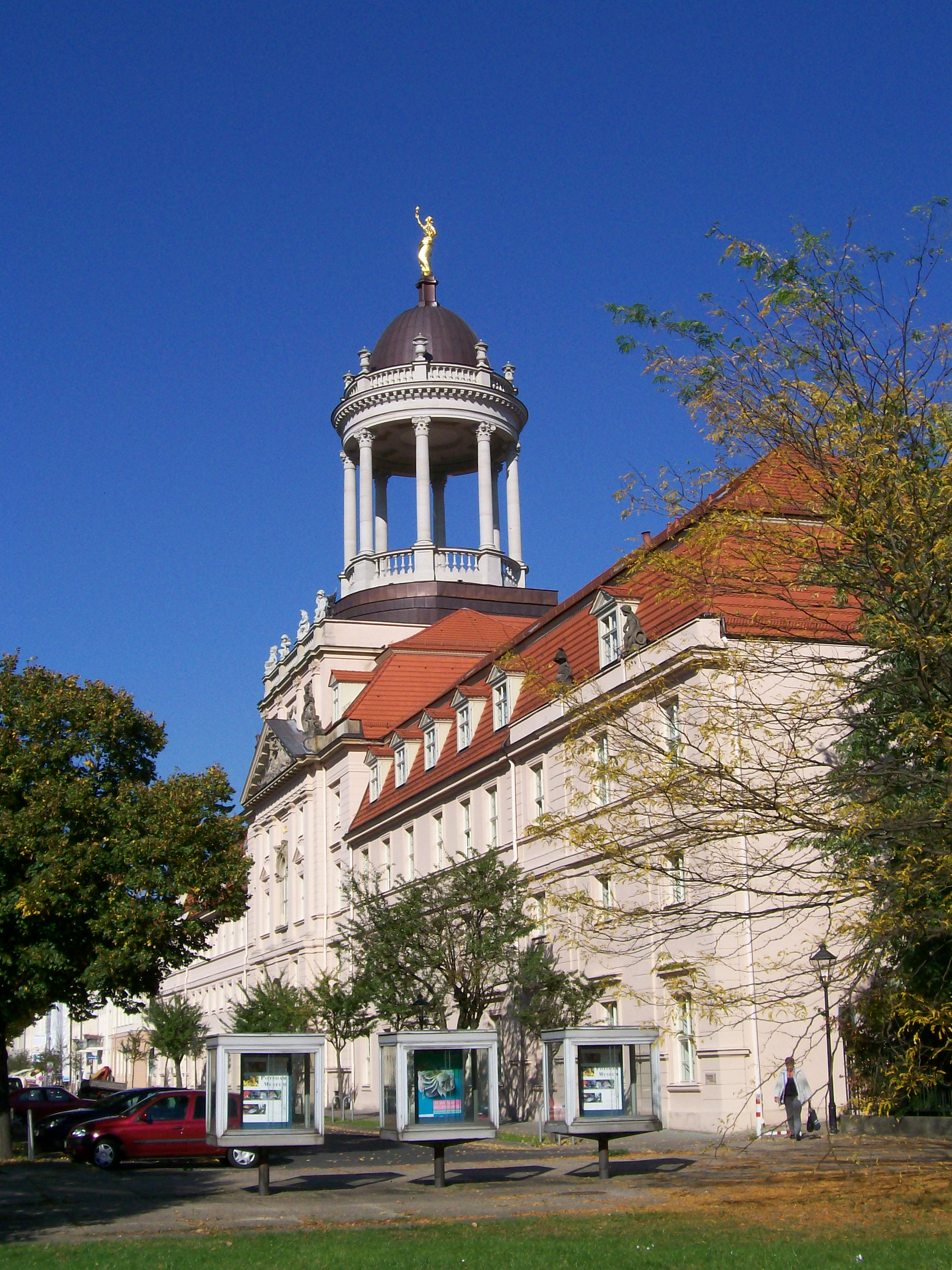
The Great Military Orphanage in Potsdam

The Great Military Orphanage (Großes Militärwaisenhaus) was a school and training institution for the children and orphans of dead, killed or impoverished soldiers and aged between 6 and 17 in Potsdam. It was founded by Frederick William I of Prussia on 1 November 1724. It taught its pupils reading, writing, arithmetic and Christianity and then helped them learn a trade. The foundation still exists and supports youth work projects.

It is the largest enclosed Baroque complex in the city, consisting of buildings at 36 Dortustraße, 34 Lindenstraße and the military hospital at 9 Breite Straße. A monopteros topped by a golden figure of caritas on the main building dates to 1771 and is one of the city's most prominent landmarks.

== History ==
=== Early days ===
Frederick William I visited the Francke Foundations in Halle an der Saale in 1713 and 1720. In imitation of them he founded the "Great Military Orphanage of Potsdam" Foundation and built the Orphanage for the Foundation between 1722 and 1724, modelling it on the one in Halle. The king granted the Orphanage lands such as the Bornstedt Crown Estate to provide food. It was boys only until 1725 and housed a total of 600 children.

It owned the largest state-run cloth and textile factory, the Berliner Lagerhaus, and a mine in Bad Freienwalde. The children were also leased out its children to cloth- and rifle-factories, where they worked up to ten hours a day - about 200 of them died each year due to the heavy workload. By the start of the Silesian Wars in 1740 the Orphanage already held 1,400 male and 155 female "wards" ("Zöglinge"). The Orphanage was run under strict military control.

=== 19th century ===
In 1802 the orphanage leased the Bornstedt Crown Estate to Chief Magistrate Kähne, the owner of Petzow Castle. From 1747 (until before 1811), the outlying farms of Torgelow and Sonnenburg were leased to the Orphanage, which also owned the alum works near Bad Freienwalde.

The education was designed to set up the children for their future life. The children were cared for, brought up and trained in a way that went beyond the norm for the time. After completing their education the boys learned a trade and the girls were taught domestic science. The teachers achieved excellent results with their students and some of the proven teaching methods also found favour in other Prussian schools. During the 18th century Enlightenment reforms were implemented and the whole education system was restructured according to the Brandenburg school reformer Friedrich Eberhard von Rochow, with large portions of textbooks and teaching methods revised.

=== 20th century ===
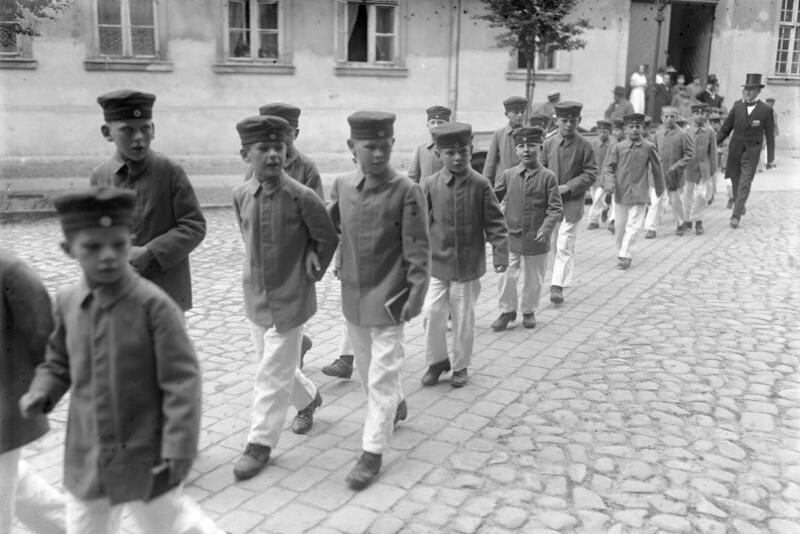
Pupils, 1932

The Orphanage was placed under civilian administration in 1919-1920 due to the Treaty of Versailles, admitting Prussian civil servants' children as well as soldiers' children. Influenced by further reforms in teaching, the orphanage's school system changed fundamentally and daily life and instruction at the Orphanage became more modern and varied. On the Nazi seizure of power the Orphanage was turned into a National Political Institute of Education and in 1937/1938 placed under Wehrmacht control. Soon afterwards the institution set up a secondary school.

After war damage in early 1945 the Orphanage was rebuilt in a simpler form but on 1 April 1952 the state government of Brandenburg dissolved the foundation and expropriated it without compensation, converting all its property to public ownership. During the German Democratic Republic (GDR), the building complex served as a children's home and later as an office building, including as the "House of Trade Unions" and as a dormitory for the Potsdam Institute for Teacher Training.

=== 1990s to present ===
In 1992, the dissolution order was rescinded and the Foundation's property returned, meaning that it was effectively formally existed continuously since 1724. It received subsidies from the State of Brandenburg until 1994, since when it has been able to finance itself again. One major source of funding is the leasing of the orphanage, including to several trade unions, and other properties.

The foundation is now based in the grounds of the Great Orphanage and supports youth work projects. Adapted to current conditions, the foundation aims to promote innovative projects that go beyond standard provision for children's and young people's education, as well as running care, educational, and vocational training facilities for children and young people. A key focus is also on supporting disadvantaged children and young people. The goal is to raise these young people to be open-minded, responsible, and tolerant individuals.

== Buildings ==
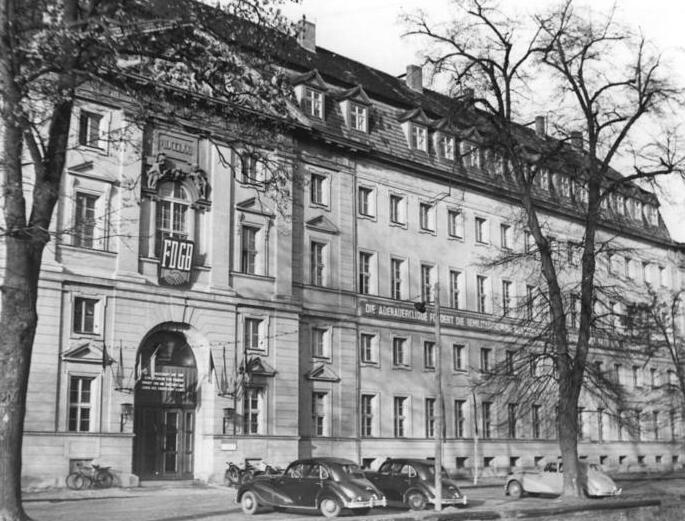
1958 - original caption "Reconstruction in Potsdam. The House of the Trade Unions".

The original building was built in 1722-1724 as a timber-framed house. In 1737 the Orphanage received an organ made by Joachim Wagner with a manual and eight registers. Increasing numbers of children led to several extensions. Frederick the Great had the Orphanage rebuilt in 1771-1778 to designs by Carl von Gontard as a four-storey late Prussian Baroque building. Gontard placed 26-metre-high monopteros on the centre of the main building, topped by a gilded figure of 'Charity' with an olive branch and a burning heart in her hands by Rudolph Kaplunger.

The rebuild did not include a new church and so the organ was sold off in 1789 (it is now in St. Marien "Unser lieben Frauen" in the Pritzerbe district of Havelsee) and orphanage services moved to the Garrison Church. Much later a new orphanage church was built in which the Dinse brothers installed a new organ with 20 registers, two manuals and a pedal.

Thew Orphanage also served as a film set - part of Mädchen in Uniform (1931) was filmed there, including the scene in the stairwell depicting Manuela von Meinhardis' (Hertha Thiele) suicide attempt. Part of the complex was badly damaged in the Bombing of Potsdam on 14 April 1945 and the cupola was set on fire by Soviet artillery fire on 26 April the same year, destroying its sculpture. The damaged colonnade was removed in 1950 and the rest of the main building had been rebuilt in a simplified form by 1950. The northeast wing (corner of Dortustrasse and Spornstrasse) was demolished in 1960. The southeast wing (Breitestrasse and Dortustrasse) was blown up in May 1966 and rebuilt between 1971 and 1981.

During the most recent restoration all the details of the cupola building – the columns, the capitals, the vases and the putti – had to be recreated. Some elements had already been recast in the 1950s, but these had been made of concrete and some were rather inappropriately adorned with wine glasses. Thanks to detailed photographs, it proved possible to reconstruct most of these elements faithfully. The sculpture proved more of a challenge for the sculptor Andreas Hoferick - it was only visible as a blur in many photographs. The restoration was completed in 2004, and the 3.75-meter-high figure once again stands atop its 46-meter-high temple tower on Lindenstrasse. The costs of 4.2 million euros were borne by the Großes Militär-Waisenhaus zu Potsdam Foundation, the city of Potsdam and the state of Brandenburg, the Bevölkerung and the German Foundation for Monument Protection.

== Gallery ==
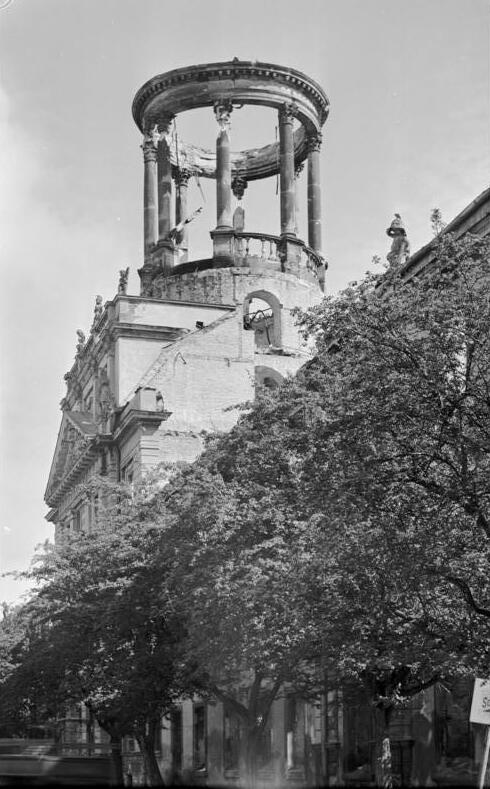
The destroyed monopteros

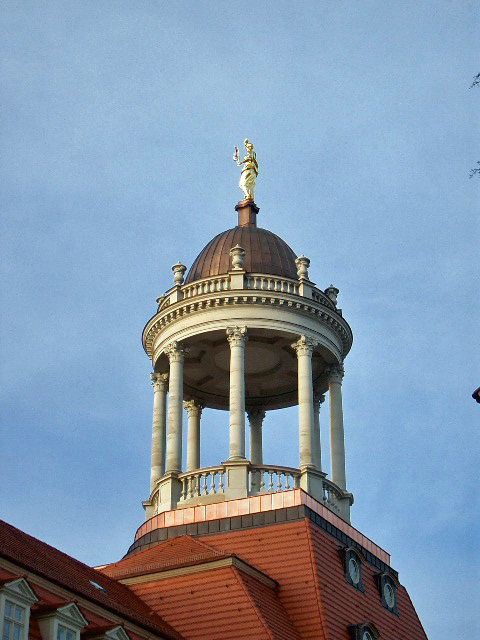
Reconstructed monopteros with sculpture

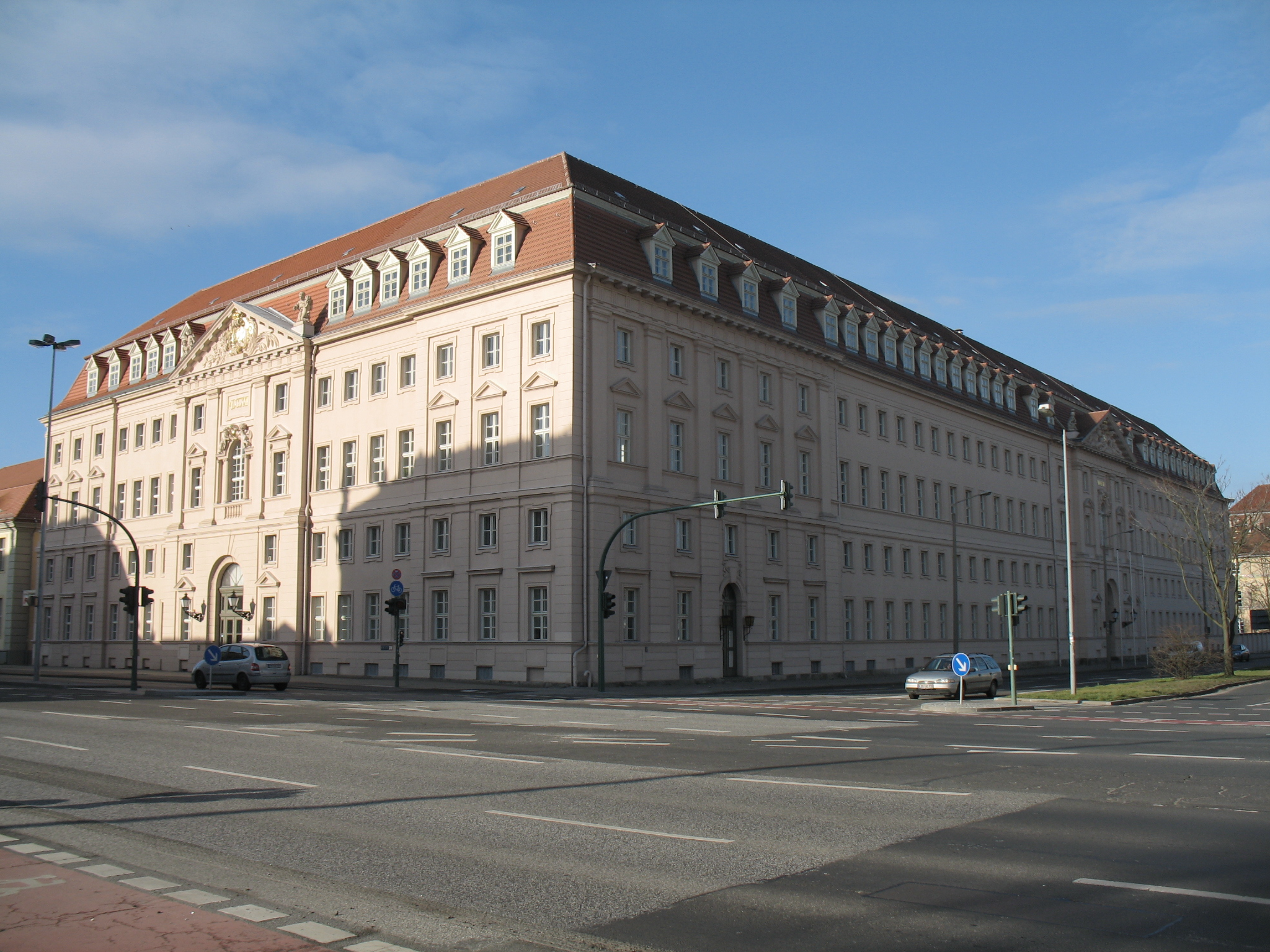
Facade on Breiten Straße and Dortustraße

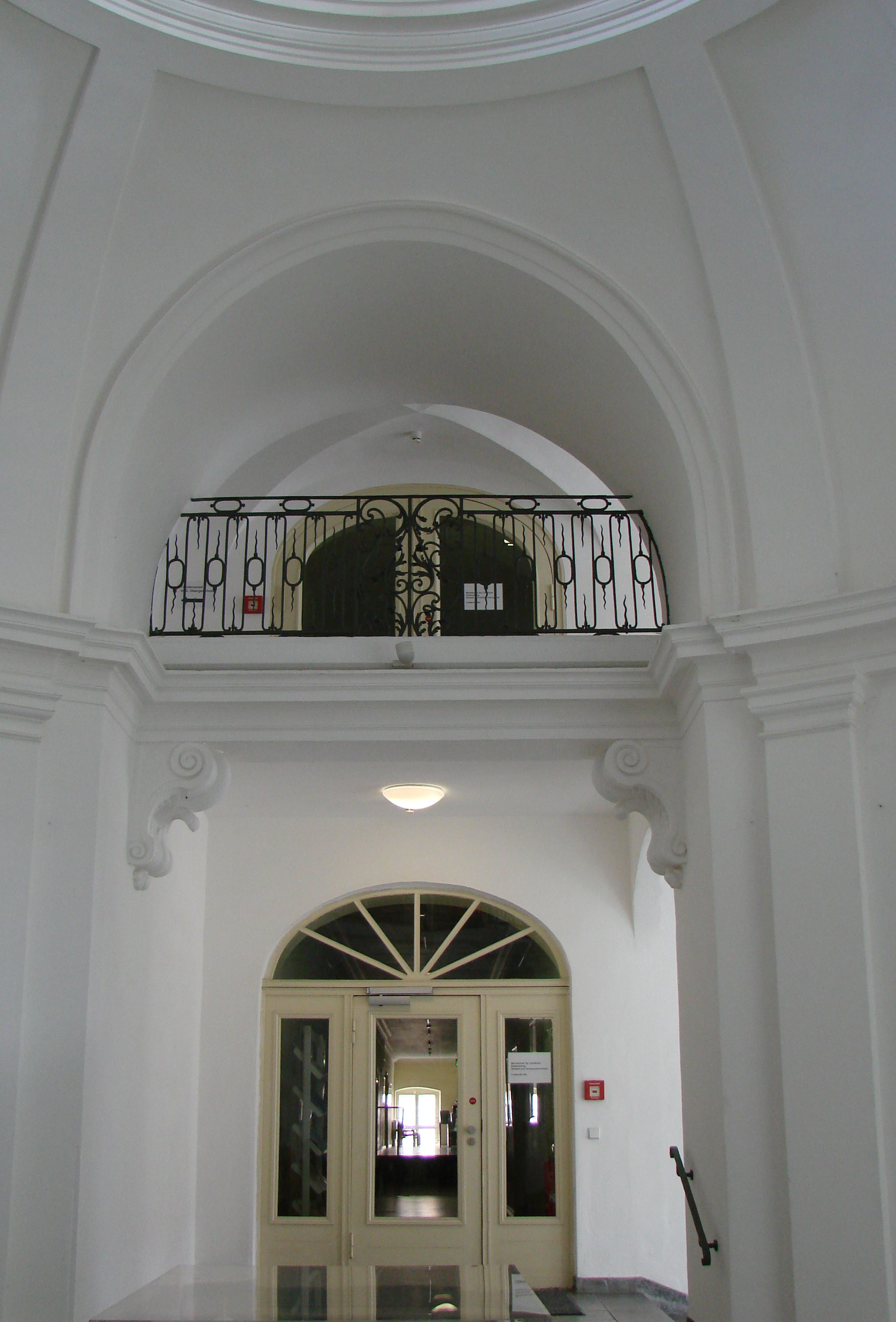
Ground floor entrance hall

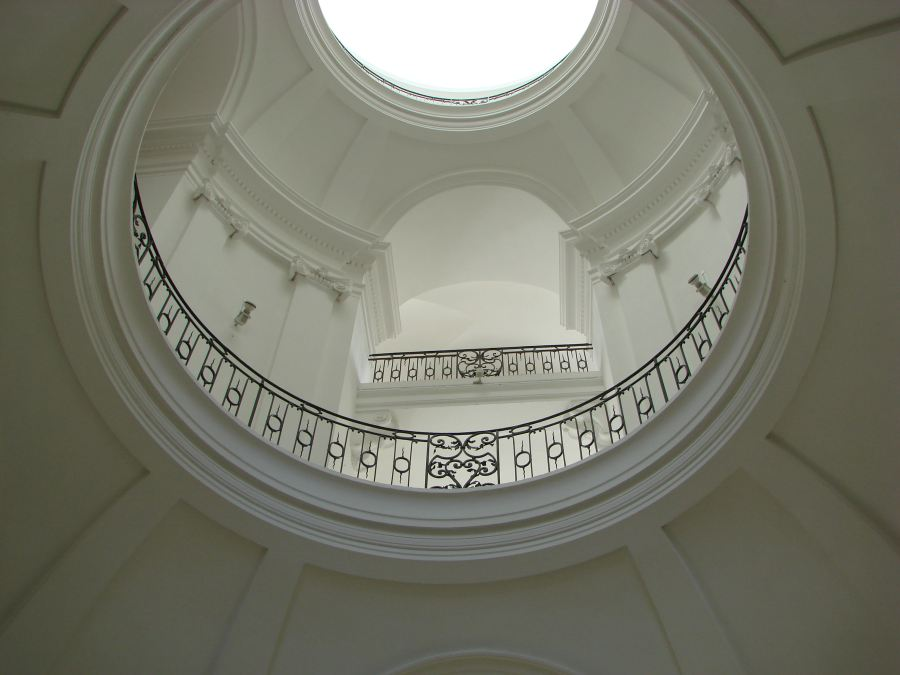
Interior of the dome from the entrance hall

== Associated people ==
=== Directors and educators ===
The Prussian Minister of War was the 'Chef der Direktion' (Head of Direction).

- Friedrich Wilhelm von Rohdich
- Wilhelm Ferdinand von Berg (1847–1827)
- August Zarnack, director of education 1815–1827
- Friedrich Wilhelm Gotthilf Frosch, preacher and head of the school system 1824–1834
- Adolph von Randow, director 1856–1881
- Anton von Steuben, director 1911–1920
- Wilhelm Staehle, commandant 1939–1945

=== Alumni ===
- Eleonore Prochaska (1785–1813)

== Bibliography (in German) ==
- Volker Schobeß: Das Königliche Große Militärwaisenhaus und seine Militärschüler. In: Das Kriegshandwerk der Deutschen. Preußen und Potsdam 1717-1945. Trafo Verlag, Berlin 2015, ISBN 978-3-86464-055-1
- Paul Sigel, Silke Dähmlow, Frank Seehausen und Lucas Elmenhorst: Architekturführer Potsdam. Dietrich Reimer Verlag, Berlin 2006, ISBN 3-496-01325-7.
- Geschichte des Königlichen Potsdamschen Militärwaisenhauses, von seiner Entstehung bis auf die jetzige Zeit. Herausgegeben zur hundertjährigen Stiftungsfeier der Anstalt im November 1824. Ernst Siegfried Mittler, Berlin und Posen 1824 (Volltext), (Digitized) (E-Book: ISBN 978-3-941919-74-7, Potsdam 2010)
- Geschichte des Königlichen Potsdamschen Militärwaisenhauses von seiner Entstehung bis auf die jetzige Zeit . Berlin und Posen, bei Ernst Siegfried Mittler, 1824, Reprint Hardcover, ISBN 978-3-88372-014-2, Potsdam 2012
- Frank Schmitz: Großes Waisenhaus zu Potsdam. Stadtwandel Verlag, Berlin 2006, ISBN 3-937123-95-4
- Militär-Wochenblatt: unabhängige Zeitschrift für die deutsche Wehrmacht, Band 60, 1875, S. 535

== External links (in German) ==
- Heritage listing
- Stiftung „Großes Waisenhauses zu Potsdam“ – offizielle Website
- Potsdam, Militärwaisenhaus – Bilder beim Wissenschaftlichen Bildarchiv für Architektur
- Großes Militärwaisenhaus zu Potsdam. PotsdamWiki
- Altersversorgung preussischer Soldaten. GenWiki
- Militärmuseum Brandenburg-Preußen
- Waisenfriedhof (PDF; 3,0 MB)
- Das ehemalige Große Militärwaisenhaus zu Potsdam – Seite bei Potsdam.de, Stand: 27. Januar 2017; Quelle u. a. zum Wahrzeichen
