= Op. 114 =

In music, Op. 114 stands for Opus number 114. Compositions that are assigned this number include:

- Brahms – Clarinet Trio
- Dvořák – Rusalka
- Prokofiev – Flourish, Mighty Land
- Schumann – 3 Lieder für 3 Frauenstimmen
- Sibelius – Five Esquisses (Viisi luonnosta), for solo piano (1929)
- Strauss – Liebeslieder, Op. 114
