= Diesdorf =

- Municipality
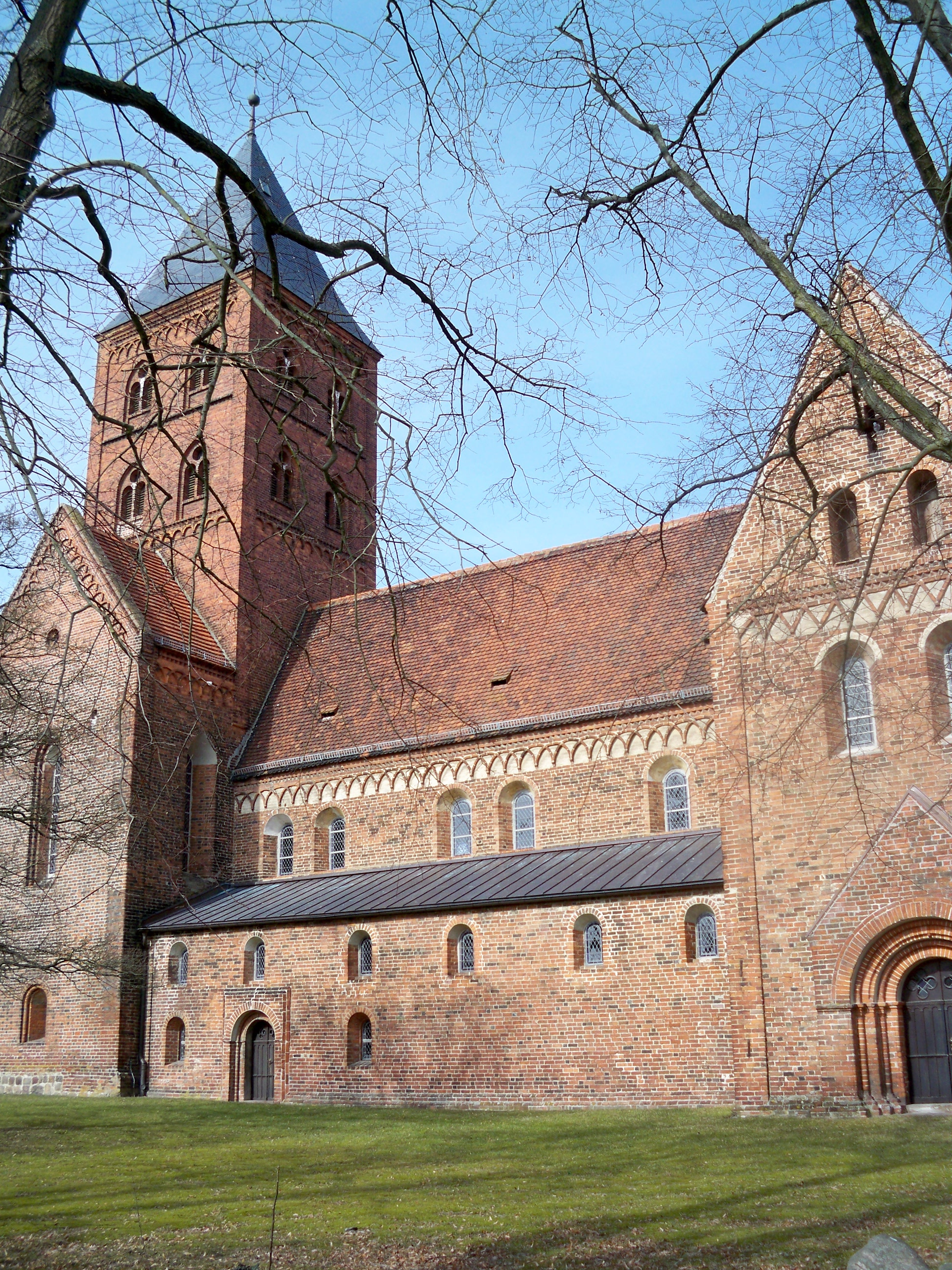
- Diesdorf: Monastery church

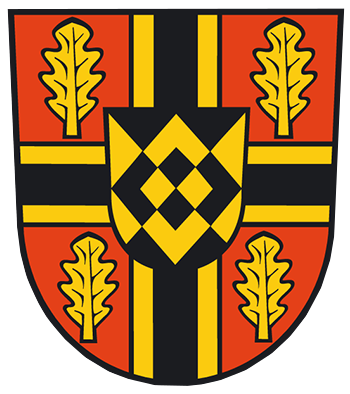
- Coat of arms

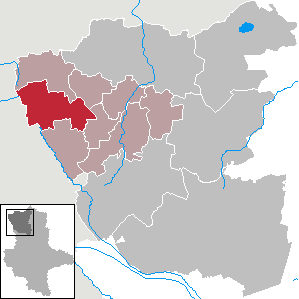
- Location of Diesdorf within Altmarkkreis Salzwedel district
- Interactive map of Diesdorf
- Location within Germany Location within Saxony-Anhalt
- Coordinates: 52°45′06″N 10°52′31″E
- Country: Germany
- State: Saxony-Anhalt
- District: Altmarkkreis Salzwedel
- Municipal assoc.: Beetzendorf-Diesdorf

Government
  - Mayor (2022–29): Daniel Rieck

Area
  - Total: 100.52 km^{2} (38.81 sq mi)
- Elevation: 56 m (184 ft)

Population (2025-12-31)
  - Total: 2,078
  - Density: 20.67/km^{2} (53.54/sq mi)
- Time zone: UTC+01:00 (CET)
  - Summer (DST): UTC+02:00 (CEST)
- Postal codes: 29413
- Dialling codes: 03902
- Vehicle registration: SAW
- Website: www.diesdorf.de

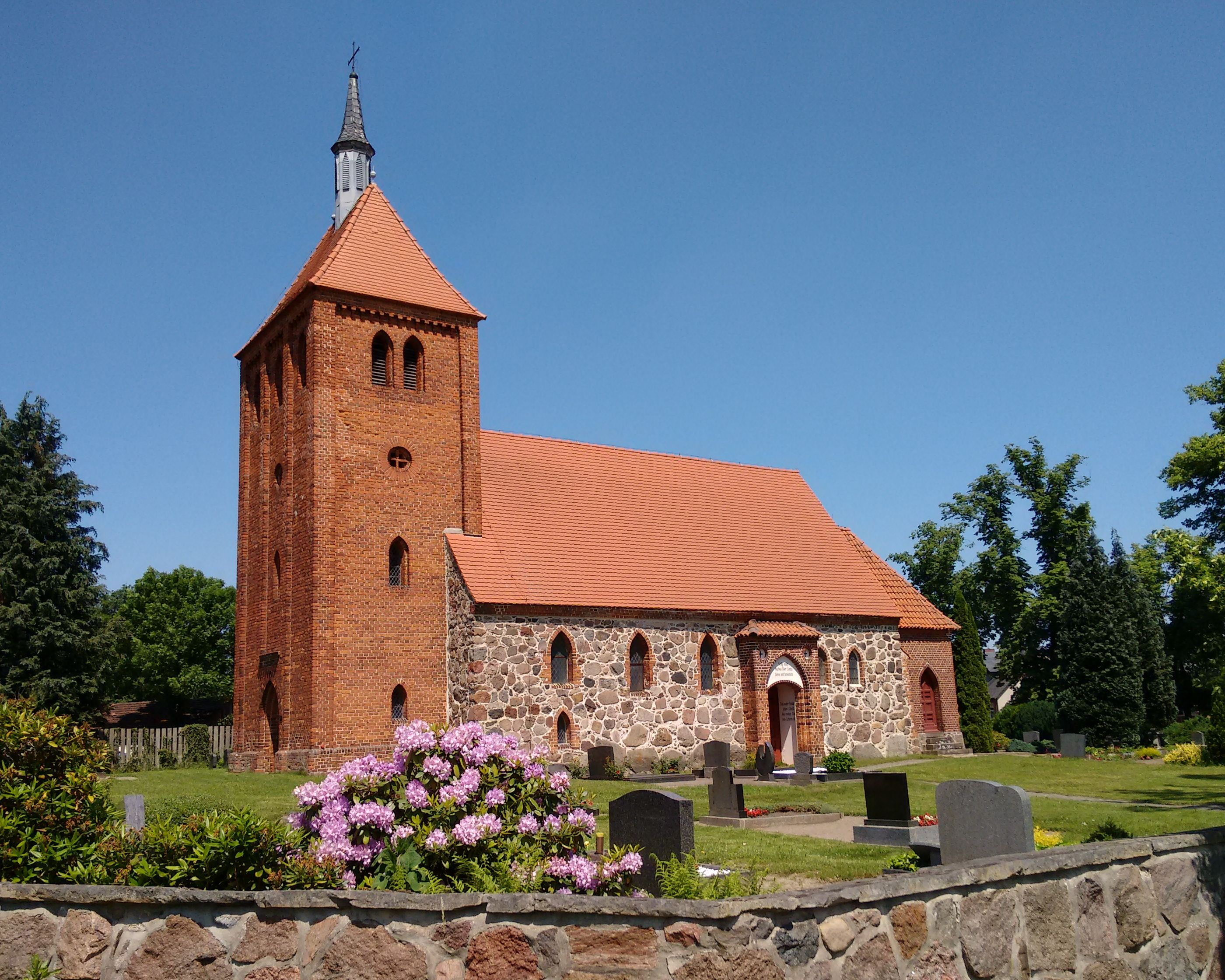
Church in Mehmke

Diesdorf is a municipality (Flecken) in the district Altmarkkreis Salzwedel, in Saxony-Anhalt, Germany.

== Geography ==
Diesdorf is situated in the western Altmark about 5 km (3 mi) east of the border between Saxony-Anhalt and Lower Saxony, which between 1945 and 1990, was part of the inner German border, and about 25 km (16 mi) southwest of Salzwedel. The nearest major settlement in Lower Saxony is Wittingen at a distance of about 10 km (6 mi). The surrounding countryside is characterised by terminal moraines and sandy soils, which are mostly wooded. It was formed during the Saale stage of the middle Pleistocene.

Aside from the eponymous village, the municipality consists of the following districts: Abbendorf, Bergmoor, Dankensen, Dülseberg, Haselhorst, Höddelsen, Hohenböddenstedt, Hohengrieben, Lindhof, Mehmke, Molmke, Neuekrug, Peckensen, Reddigau, Schadeberg, Schadewohl, Waddekath, and Wüllmersen, as well as the smaller settlements Forsthof Vier, Kerstenberg, Römke, and Schinkenmühle. Waddekath is located immediately east of the former inner German border.

The climate is relatively dry, with an average yearly precipitation of 622 mm, lower values being registered in only 25% of the weather stations of DWD. Precipitation is distributed fairly evenly over the year, with a difference of 1.6 between the wettest month (August) and the driest (October) and lower variations being registered only in 4% of the DWD weather stations.

== History ==
Megalithic graves near Diesdorf, Molmke, and Schadeberg are evidence of the area having already been populated in the Upper Paleolithic era.

Diesdorf was first mentioned in 1112. The monastery Marienwerder of the Augustinian Canons, founded in 1161 by count Hermann of Warpke-Lüchow, had a major influence on the development of the village. After the Protestant Reformation and the secularisation of the monastery in 1551, the administration of a demesne of the state of Brandenburg and a noble women's convent were established in its place. Both were dissolved under the rule of the Kingdom of Westphalia in 1810.

After the return to Prussia, Diesdorf and the Altmark were integrated into the Magdeburg district of the Province of Saxony, from which the country of Saxony-Anhalt emerged in 1947. From 1952 to 1990 Diesdorf was part of Kreis Salzwedel in Bezirk Magdeburg.

Abbedorf and Waddekath were incorporated into Diesdorf on 1 January 1991 and Schadeberg followed on 1 November 1992. The formerly independent municipality of Neuekrug was incorporated on 1 January 2010, and the municipality of Mehmke on 1 September 2010.

The coat of arms was confirmed by the regional council in Magdeburg on 1 April 1997 and refers to the traditions of the Augustinian monastery and its role in the Christianisation of the area, symbolised by the black cross with golden borders, as well as to the location near the border of several lordships, symbolised by the rhombic pattern in the escutcheon which stands for a traditional border fence, but also for the pattern of the timber framework of the buildings. The oak leaves refer to the natural beauty of the countryside and the old oak trees along the monastery walls.

In 1998 the municipality was officially designated as a Flecken.

A storage facility for natural gas was built in a salt dome near Peckensen and has been substantially extended in 2014.

== Transportation ==
State road 8 between Wittingen and Salzwedel, part of tourist route German Timber-Frame Road, passes through Diesdorf, and state road 11 to Beetzendorf and Apenburg, part of tourist route Romanesque Road branches off in the centre of Diesdorf village. The railway lines to Salzwedel, Beetzendorf, and Wittingen were closed in 1993, 1973, and 1945, respectively.

== Population and politics ==
Per the 2011 census, 41.1% of the then 2474 inhabitants were recorded as Protestants, 3.2% as Roman Catholics, the remaining 54.7% did not state any religion.

After the elections of 7 June 2009, of the 12 seats in the municipal council were distributed as follows: CDU 3 seats, Die Linke 4 seats, SPD 4 seats, FDP 1 seat.

== Sights ==
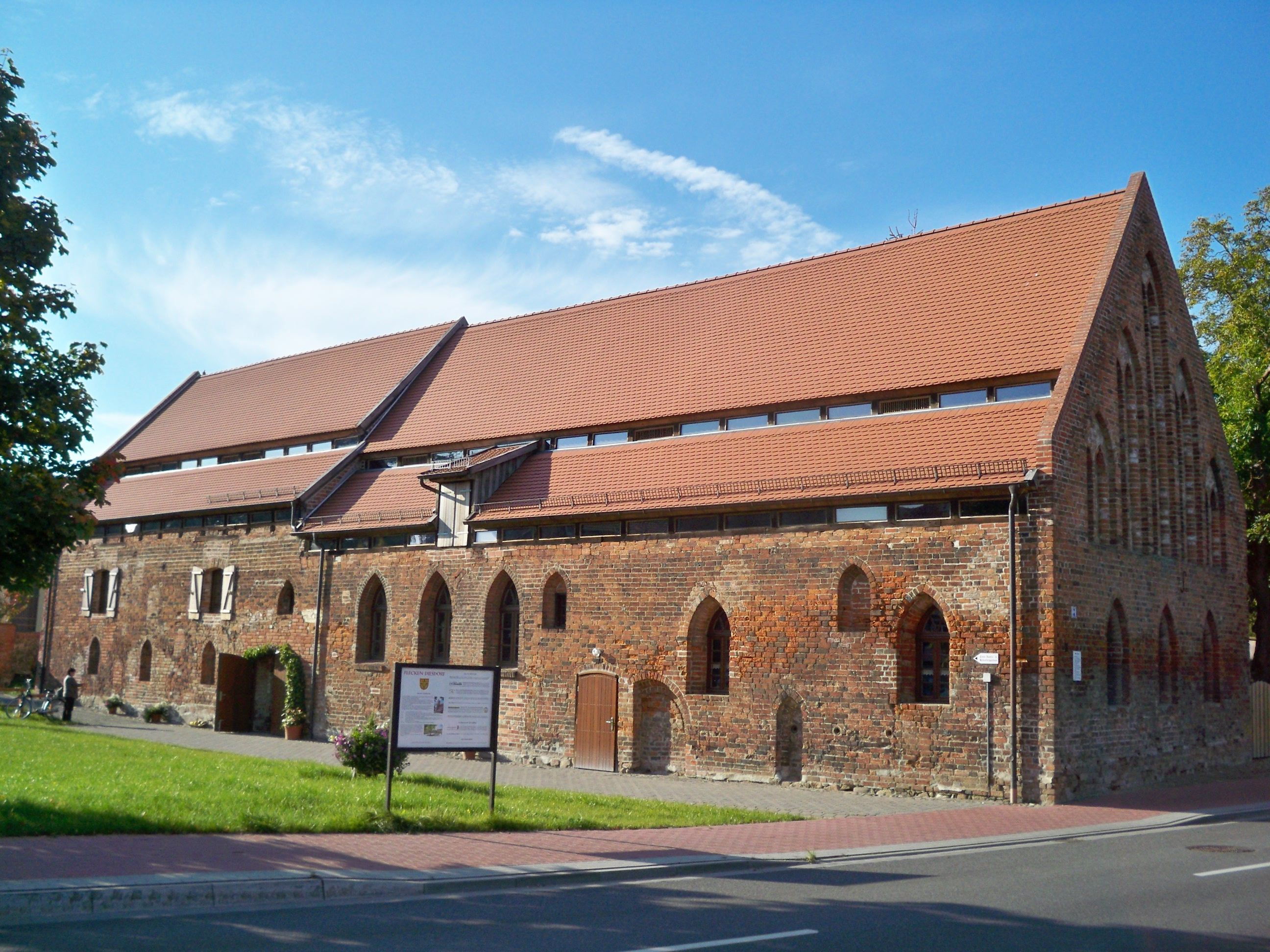
Alte Darre, oast house of the former monastery

Diesdorf is home to what is claimed to be the oldest open-air museum in Germany. Opened in 1911 by the local doctor, Goerg Schultze, the museum comprises more than 20 mostly timber-framed historical houses and farm buildings, as well as a post mill. At the same time as creating the museum, the doctor also set up an adjacent open-air swimming pool.

The church St Mary and Crucis of the former monastery has been built in Brick Romanesque style. Construction started in 1182. Its neo-romanesque tower was added in 1863. Alte Darre, the old brewing and baking house of the former monastery dating back to the 14th century, has been restored in the early 2010s and is used as the local historical museum. The monastery walls are largely preserved.

Several megalithic graves are found in the municipal area.
