= Eleonore Prochaska =

Prussian soldier (1785–1813)

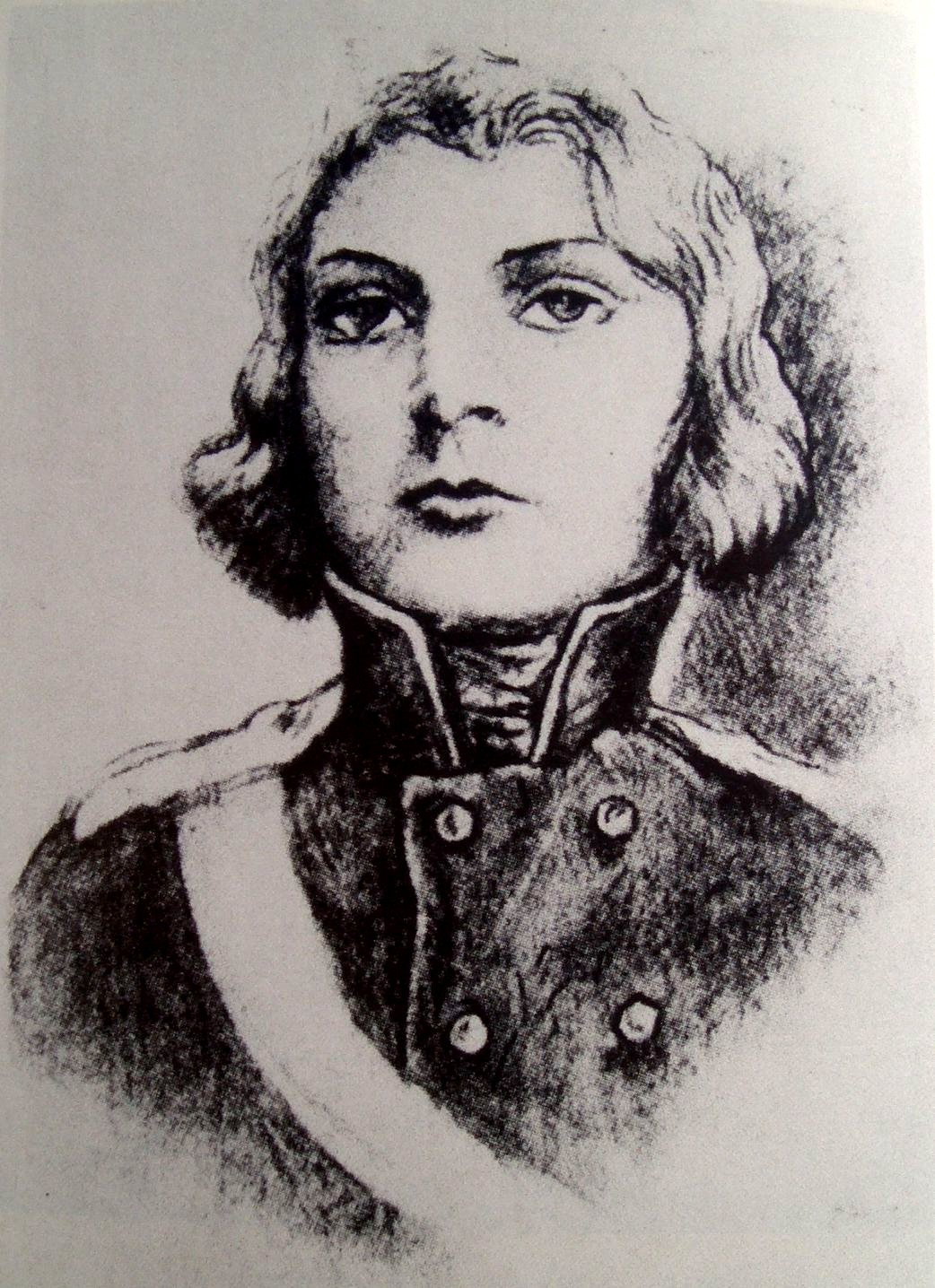
- 19th century illustration of Prochaska
- Born: Marie Christiane Eleonore Prochaska; 11 March 1785
- Died: 5 October 1813 (aged 28)
- Other name: August Renz
- Military career
- Allegiance: Prussia
- Branch: Army
- Service years: 1813
- Unit: Lützow Free Corps
- Conflicts: Napoleonic Wars; Battle of the Göhrde

Marie Christiane Eleonore Prochaska (11 March 1785 in Potsdam – 5 October 1813 in Dannenberg), also known as Leonore Prohaska, was a German female soldier who fought in the Prussian army against Napoleon during the War of the Sixth Coalition.

== Life ==
Prochaska's father was a noncommissioned officer in the Prussian guards, serving on a low income. She grew up poor and was sent by her father to the military orphanage in Potsdam when her mother died. There she later found work as a domestic servant, though she was also interested in the war against Napoleon from an early age.

During these wars Prochaska disguised herself as a man and registered for 1 Jägerbataillon of the Lützow Free Corps under the name August Renz in 1813, serving first as a drummer, then later in the infantry. She was severely wounded at the Battle of the Göhrde and field surgeons, rushing to treat her wounds, discovered she was a woman and took her to Dannenberg, where she succumbed to her wounds three weeks later.

== Legacy ==
In retrospect, Prochaska was strongly idealized as a chaste heroine and honoured as "Potsdam's Joan of Arc" ("die Potsdamer Jeanne d'Arc"). Various plays and poems were written on her life (including those by Friedrich Rückert and Emil Taubert), whilst Ludwig van Beethoven began a "Bühnenmusik" (WoO 96) on her, with a libretto written by Friedrich Duncker.

In 1863, a commemorative marker was erected over Prochaska's grave at St.-Annen-Friedhof in Danneburg and in 1889 her home town of Potsdam created a monument to her memory ("Der Heldenjungfrau zum Gedächtnis", or "In memory of the maiden-heroine"), which still survives in the almost completely cleared Alten Friedhof (old cemetery).

=== In music and literature ===
Ludwig van Beethoven composed incidental music for a play by Johann Friedrich Leopold Duncker about Prochaska, titled Leonore Prohaska. Duncker was Cabinet Secretary for the King of Prussia whom he accompanied to the Congress of Vienna. Despite Duncker's hopes, Leonore Prohaska was not performed in Vienna, which may have been due to the fact that the material had already been treated in Piwald's Das Mädchen von Potsdam which did have a performance in 1814.

== Context ==
Prochaska was one of many German women who fought in the Napoleonic Wars. Friederike Krüger (1789–1848), thanks to the protection of her brigade commander, became a female corporal in the Prussian army. Finally she served in 2nd Garde-Regiment zu Fuß. Her request to retire was accepted in 1816 and she returned to civilian life.

Johanna Stegen (1793–1842), from Lüneburg, fought as a civilian for the rifle battalion of the 1st Pommerian Infantry Regiment in a battle at Lüneburg, where she provided troops with ammunition.

Anna Lühring (1796–1866) joined the Lützower Jäger in 1814 under the name Eduard Kruse and survived the Napoleonic Wars, though her public fame faded quickly.

== See also ==
- Franziska Scanagatta
- Marie Schellinck
- Nadezhda Durova
