= Ich hab die Nacht geträumet =

German folk song

- Folk song
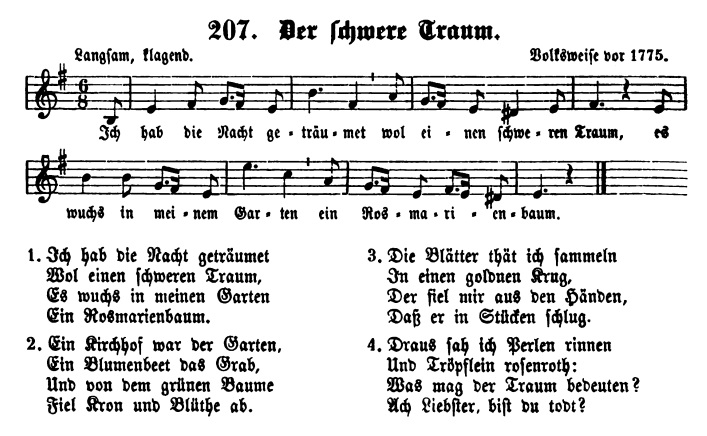
- From Deutscher Liederhort (1893), p. 618
- English: I dreamed last night
- Text: by August Zarnack
- Language: German
- Published: 1820

"Ich hab die Nacht geträumet" (I dreamed last night) is a German folk song. It is a melancholic song that tells of a disturbing dream foreshadowing death – a rosemary tree in the garden, falling leaves, and a jar broken to pieces and bleeding a red liquid. In Northern Germany, rosemary was planted in graveyards, and mourners at funerals would sometimes wear rosemary stalks.

== History ==
It is unknown when the song was first popularized, but the melody was first written and published in 1777 by Friedrich Nicolai in Eyn feyner kleyner Almanach with the text of "Es wollt ein Jäger jagen" (A hunter wanted to go hunting). Other versions using the same melody but different lyrics included "Das Laub fällt von den Bäumen" (The leaves fall from the trees) by Siegfried August Mahlmann in 1804/1805, "Schöne Kinder lieben" (Beautiful children love), and "Zu Koblenz auf der Brücken" (In Koblenz on the bridge).

The best-known and most widely used lyrics to the melody were written by German preacher and collector of folk songs August Zarnack. Zarnack's version was originally published under the title "Der schwere Traum" (The heavy dream), and appeared in Zarnack's 1820 book which was a collection of German folk songs intended for primary schools. Zarnack's textbook sold well, and in the 1840s and onwards, "Ich hab die Nacht geträumet" was increasingly included in other music workbooks as well for schools and choirs.

== Lyrics ==
Ich hab die Nacht geträumet
wohl einen schweren Traum,
es wuchs in meinem Garten
ein Rosmarienbaum.

Ein Kirchhof war der Garten
ein Blumenbeet das Grab,
und von dem grünen Baume
fiel Kron und Blüte ab.

Die Blüten tät ich sammeln
in einen goldnen Krug,
der fiel mir aus den Händen,
dass er in Stücken schlug.

Draus sah ich Perlen rinnen
und Tröpflein rosenrot:
Was mag der Traum bedeuten?
Ach Liebster, bist Du tot?

I had a dream last night,
It was such a worrisome dream,
There was growing in my garden,
A rosemary tree.

A graveyard was the garden,
A flowerbed the grave
And from the green tree
The crown and flower fell.

The blossoms I gathered
in a golden jar,
It fell out of my hands,
And smashed to pieces.

Out of it I saw pearls trickling
And droplets rose-red
What could the dream mean?
Oh, my love, are you dead?

== Melody ==
Source

== Musical settings ==
Johannes Brahms wrote a choral version of the song between 1859 and 1862. Max Reger published two versions for choir a cappella, in 1898 a setting for men's chorus choral (TTBB) as No. 5 of WoO VI/6, and in 1899 a setting for mixed choir as No. 4 of WoO VI/11. In 2004, the German band Heimatærde released its first EP named after the song, including two versions of it. The 2016 video game Civilization VI uses four versions of the song as its theme for the German civilization.
