= Liebeslieder Walzer (ballet) =

- Choreographer: George Balanchine
- Music: Johannes Brahms
- Premiere: 12 November 1960; New York City Center
- Original ballet company: New York City Ballet
- Design: David Hays; Barbara Karinska
- Genre: Neoclassical ballet

Liebeslieder Walzer is a two-part neoclassical ballet choreographed by George Balanchine to Johannes Brahms' Liebeslieder Waltzes, Op. 52 and Neue Liebeslieder, Op. 65, with original sets and lighting designed by David Hays, and costumes designed by Barbara Karinska. The ballet premiered on 12 November 1960 at the New York City Center, performed by the New York City Ballet.

== Structure and analysis ==
In the first part of Liebeslieder Walzer, which features 18 songs, is set in a ballroom, with the women are dressed in satin ballroom dresses and heels, while the men wears tailcoats, dancing ballroom waltz. Following a brief break with the curtains lowered, the women switch to romantic tutus and pointe shoes, while the men only take off the gloves. The doors are opened and showed the sky. This section's style resemble classical ballet The dancers eventually exit the stage, before returning two by two, in the costumes from the first half of the ballet, and listen to the last song motionless.

Throughout Liebeslieder Walzer, the four couples display different kinds of emotions and subtle behavior, which is regarded as the most difficult part for the dancers. Balanchine had remarked that the ballet is about the "changing aspects of love." Shortly after the premiere, Balanchine said, "In the first act, it's the real people that are dancing. In the second act, it's their souls." Alastair Macaulay, a New York Times critic who broke down the first section, wrote that the ballet is about "adult love and its attendant shadows: tender, often rapturous, exceptionally poignant." On one of the couple's interactions, he commented that he "suspected" that Balanchine was "telling us something about himself."

A soprano, a mezzo-soprano, a tenor, a baritone and two pianists playing in four hands perform on stage left. All of them are dressed in evening suits and ball gowns, identical to the ones worn by the dancers.

== Production ==
=== Music ===
Liebeslieder Walzer is set to Johannes Brahms' Liebeslieder Waltzes, Op. 52 and Neue Liebeslieder, Op. 65, 33 songs in total. Apart from the final song, which is set to poetry by Johann Wolfgang von Goethe, all the lyrics are taken from Georg Friedrich Daumer's poets. Balanchine had said that he "had to do dances set to this music" despite its length.

=== Designs ===
The original set, designed by David Hays, is a bourgeois salon. In 1984, a year after Balanchine died, New York City Ballet co-founder Lincoln Kirstein commissioned a new Rococo-inspired sets by David Mitchell, which were inspired by Nymphenburg Palace, where Balanchine had visited in 1971, and was the sets Balanchine envisioned when he made the ballet. Barbara Karinska designed the costumes.

== Original cast ==
Dancers:

- Diana Adams
- Melissa Hayden
- Jillana
- Violette Verdy
- Bill Carter
- Jonathan Watts
- Conrad Ludlow
- Nicholas Magallanes

Pianists:

- Louise Sherman
- Robert Irving

Singers:

- Angeline Rasmussen
- Mitzi Wilson
- Frank Porretta
- Herbert Beattie

== Revivals ==
Other companies that had danced Liebeslieder Walzer include Vienna State Ballet, The Royal Ballet, Ballett Zürich, Pacific Northwest Ballet, Boston Ballet and San Francisco Ballet.

Following Balanchine's death, the rights of the ballet was left to Karin von Aroldingen, who had danced Diana Adams's role and taught the ballet at Balanchine's request during his lifetime.

In 2020, in response to performance cancellations due to the coronavirus, New York City Ballet released two extracts of Liebeslieder Walzer online. The first one, recorded in 2012, features Maria Kowroski and Jonathan Stafford. The second one was recorded in 2016 with Lauren Lovette, in her role debut, and Jared Angle.
