= Liebeslieder (Strauss) =

Waltz by Johann Strauss II

Liebeslieder op. 114 is a waltz by Johann Strauss II written in 1852 (not to be confused with Brahms's similarly titled Liebeslieder Walzer and Neue Liebeslieder). Conceived as Liebesgedichte (Love Poems), it was announced during its first performance as Liebesständchen (Love Serenade). The premiere took place at the Vienna Volksgarten on 18 June 1852, led by the composer.

Liebeslieder is described as one of the master works of the Strauss Jr. Since 1849, he had struggled to convince Vienna of the value of his compositions. The fierce, uncompromising critic Eduard Hanslick praised this waltz, writing in the Wiener Zeitung: "Those bad-tempered old-fashioned people, whose narrow-mindedness goes [so] far as to call today's dance music contemptible should be serenaded with ashaming generosity by the Liebeslieder of the young Johann Strauss."

The waltz is essentially a love serenade in 3/4 and opens quietly with pizzicato strings before a full-bodied forte introduces the waltz. The first theme conveys a yearning feeling and accelerates into a strong melody. The mood alternates between lushly romantic passages and light-hearted sections, some with prominent flute. The piece ends dramatically with a timpani drumroll and brass flourish, creating a sense of anticipation.

Liebeslieder has been arranged for string orchestra and string quintet. Many of these arrangements are performed under the title Music of the Old Vienna, hinting at the nostalgic, romantic character of Strauss's music.
