= Anna Lühring =

Prussian soldier (1796–1866)

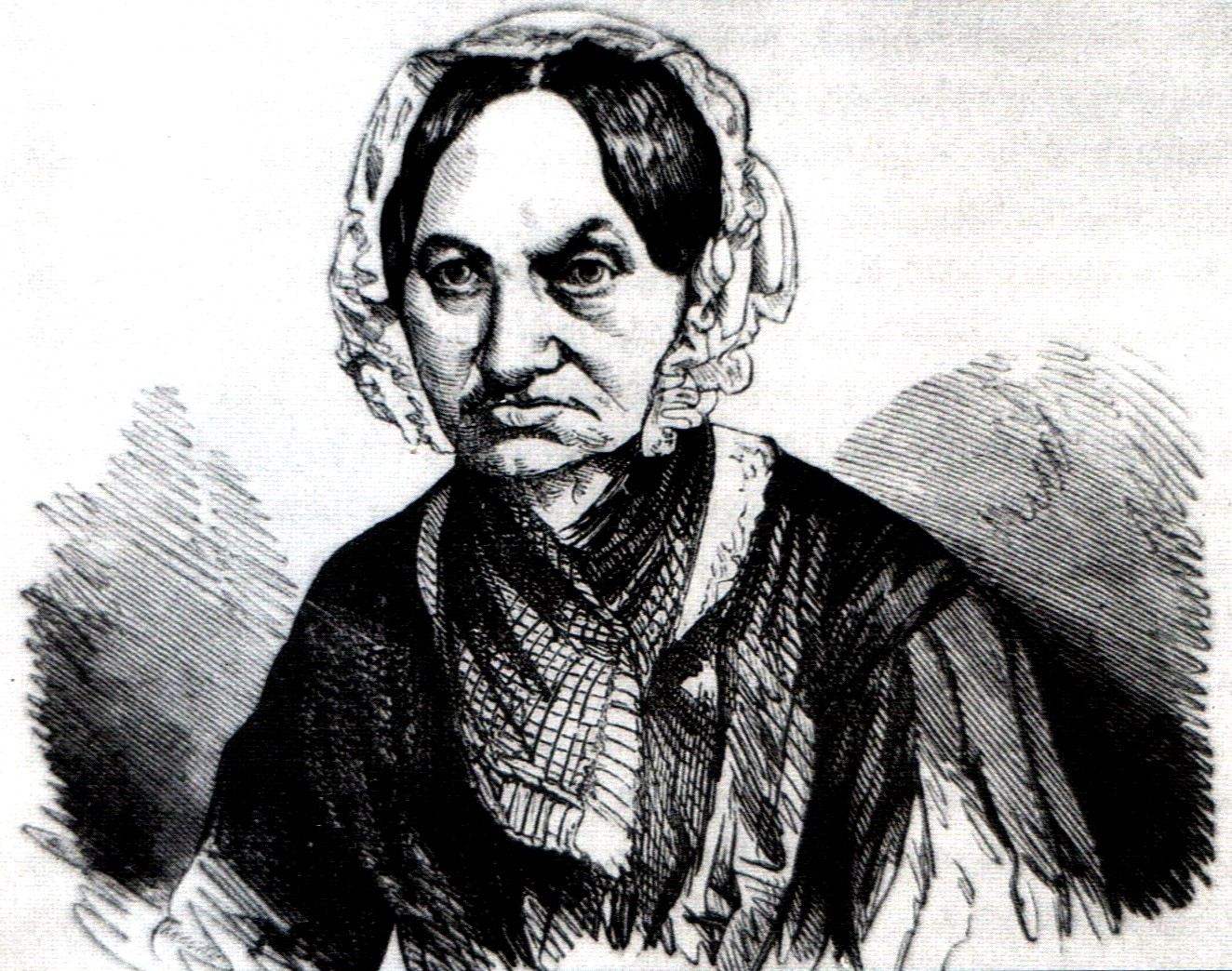
- Born: August 3, 1796
- Died: August 25, 1866 (aged 70); Hamburg
- Known for: soldier in the Prussian army during the Napoleonic Wars

Anna Lühring (3 August 1796, in Bremen – 25 August 1866, in Hamburg) (sometimes wrongly referred to as Anna Lührmann) was a soldier in the Prussian army during the Napoleonic Wars.

== Life ==
The daughter of a craftsman in Bremen, she became keen to join up after Tettenborn's capture of Bremen and the death of Eleonore Prochaska whilst serving in the Prussian Army. At the age of 17, dressed in her brother's clothing, she left Bremen in February 1814 and joined the Lützow Free Corps under the name Eduard Kruse at Jülich. In this unit she participated in the siege of Jülich and some smaller engagements during this. Even after her true identity became known, she remained in the unit until its return to Berlin, where she was honoured for her services. In February 1815 she returned to her parental home.

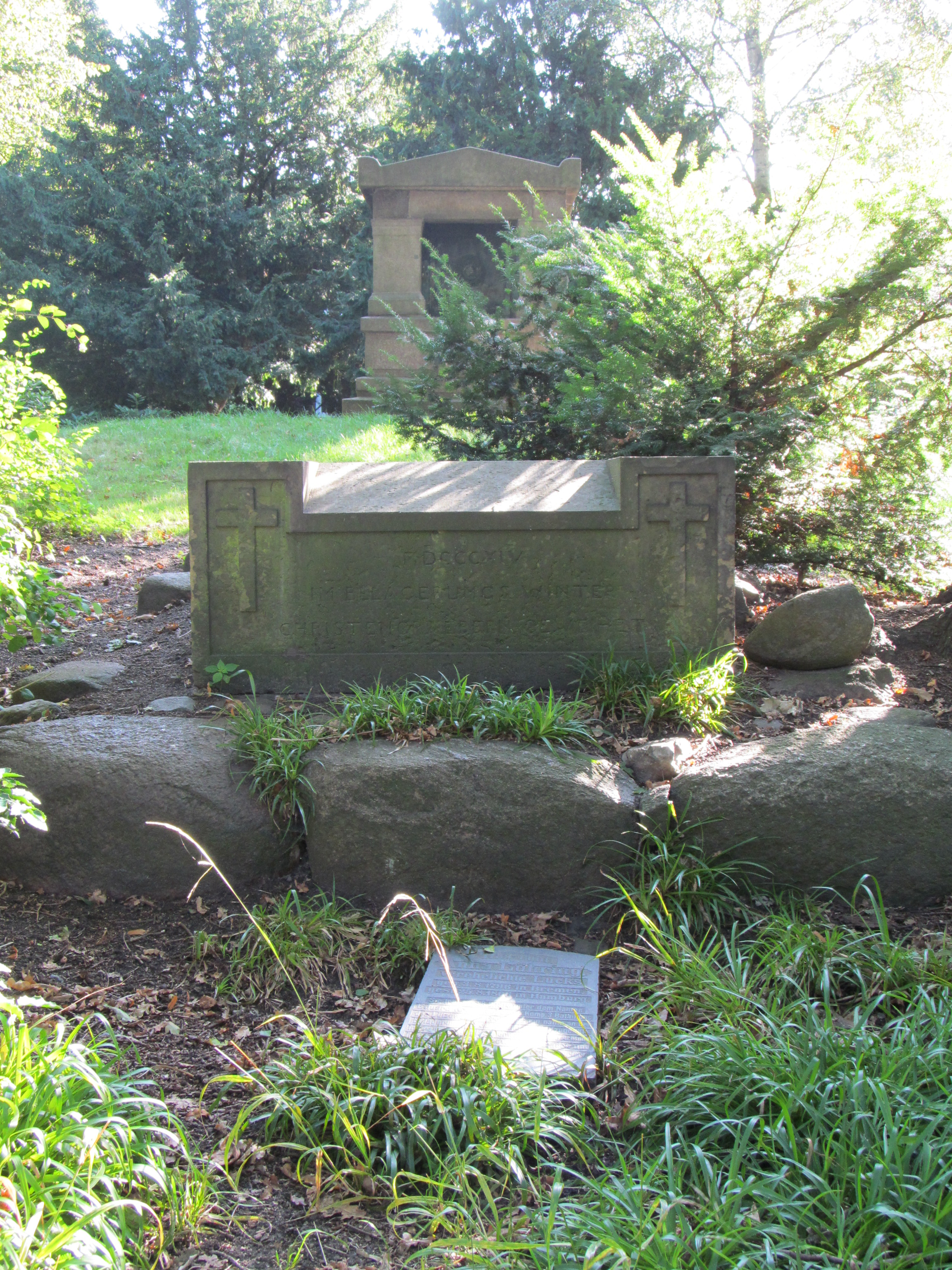
Anna Lühring's grave in Hamburg

In 1821, she married Karl Lucks from Altona, and in 1827 he became a citizen of Hamburg. After his death in 1832 she lived alone and poor in the Horn quarter. From 1860 she received a small pension from her hometown of Bremen in return for her services. Today, Anna-Lühring-Straße and Anna-Lühring-Weg in Bremen and Anna-Lühring-Weg in Hamburg-Horn are named after her.

== Bibliography ==
- (in German) Herbert Schwarzwälder: Berühmte Bremer. Paul-List-Verlag, Munich 1976, ISBN 3-471-78718-6, pp. 62–70.
