= Alle Jahre wieder =

German Christmas carol

Alle Jahre wieder (English: "Every year again") is a well-known German Christmas carol. The text was written in 1837 by Wilhelm Hey. It is usually sung to a melody attributed to Friedrich Silcher, who published it in an 1842 song cycle based on a book of fables by Otto Speckter.

Alternative settings stem from the pen of Ernst Anschütz and Christian Heinrich Rinck. The latter's is nowadays more frequently used for one of Hoffmann von Fallersleben's poems, Abend wird es wieder.

== Lyrics and melody ==
Alle Jahre wieder
kommt das Christuskind
auf die Erde nieder,
wo wir Menschen sind.

Kehrt mit seinem Segen
ein in jedes Haus,
geht auf allen Wegen
mit uns ein und aus.

Steht auch mir zur Seite
still und unerkannt,
dass es treu mich leite
an der lieben Hand.

Every year again
Comes the Christ Child
Down to earth
Where we people are.

Stops with his blessing
At every house
Walks on all paths
With us in and out.

Stands also at my side
Silent and unrecognized
To faithfully lead me
with His beloved hand.

== See also ==
- List of Christmas carols
