= O Tannenbaum =

German song about a fir tree, associated in English with Christmas

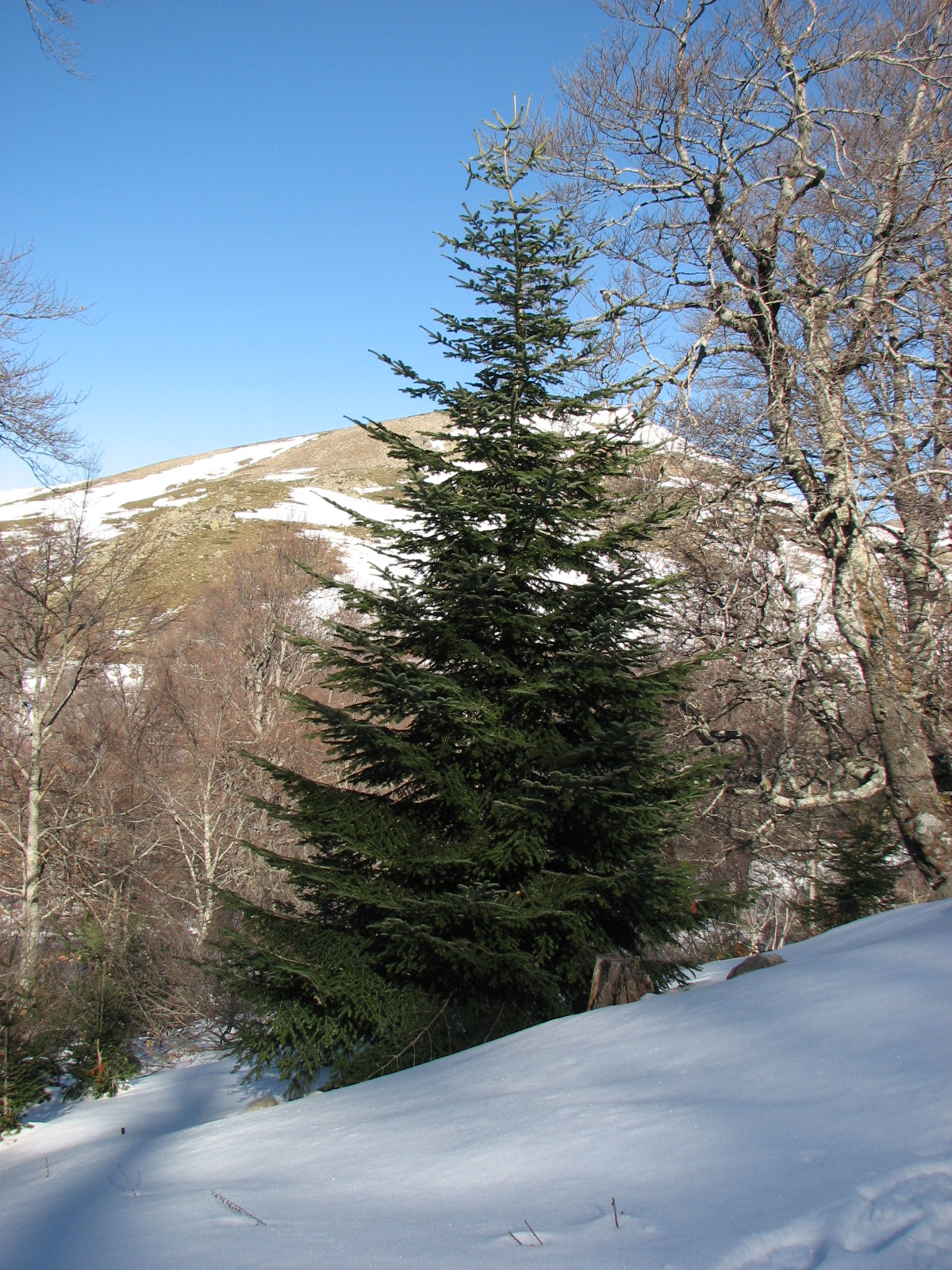
- Silver fir (Abies alba)

Song
- Language: German
- English title: O Christmas Tree
- Published: 1824
- Lyricist: Ernst Anschütz

Audio sample
- Bilingual performance of the first verse by the United States Army Band Chorus: file; help

"O Tannenbaum" (German: [oː ˈtanənbaʊm]; "O fir tree"), known in English as "O Christmas Tree", is a German Christmas song. Based on a traditional folk song that was unrelated to the holiday, it became associated with the traditional Christmas tree.

== History ==
The song lyrics draw on a long-standing tradition of the Tannenbaum (the German name for a fir tree) as a symbol of faithfulness due to the tree's evergreen quality. As early as the 16th century, songbooks included a text that gave rise to a folk song, "O Tannenbaum, du trägst ein' grünen Zweig" ("O fir tree, you wear a green branch"). In the 1856 edition of the Deutscher Liederhort, folk song collector Ludwig Erk identified three distinct melodies associated with this song in different regions of Germany. While the tunes were only recorded in the 18th and 19th centuries, a line from the song using one of the melodies was quoted in 1605 by Melchior Franck in the quodlibet "Nun fanget an".

In 1820 German educator August Zarnack published the second volume of his collection of folk songs for use in schools, including as No. 51 "Der Tannenbaum". For this number the existing folk song may have served as inspiration, but the text now presented as a lover's complaint, in which the fidelity of the fir tree is contrasted with the fickleness of a maiden. Zarnack also paired the song with a tune a bit different from those collected by Erk, using a melody that had earlier been published with the song "Es lebe hoch der Zimmermannsgeselle" ("Up high works the carpenter's apprentice"). As was occasionally the practice of folklorists under German Romanticism, Zarnack may well have written much or all of the text himself, basing the song on his own conception of a suitably folk idiom.

The lyrics known today were written by Ernst Anschütz, a teacher and organist in Leipzig, and published in his 1824 Musikalisches Schulgesangbuch. Anschütz wrote two additional verses to the song, linking the tree's faithful colouration to the joy and hope of the Christmas season. While he published it with the same "Zimmermannsgeselle" tune as Zarnack, it eventually was associated with the melody of "Lauriger Horatius", an old student song. As the custom of decorating Christmas trees became more widespread in this period, this became one of the most popular Christmas songs in both German and English, although it is not explicitly about such a tree.

Anschütz retained Zarnack's first verse, hence in German the song does not actually refer to Christmas until the second verse. Some versions today change treu ("faithful") to grün ("green") and may also alter the line Wie oft hat nicht zur Weihnachtszeit to Wie oft hat schon zur Winterzeit; if the third verse with pedagogical allusions to religion is omitted, the text can be made effectively secular.

== Melody ==
Source

== Lyrics ==
Anschütz (1824)

O Tannenbaum, o Tannenbaum!
Wie treu sind deine Blätter;
Du grünst nicht nur zur Sommerzeit,
Nein, auch im Winter, wenn es schneit.
O Tannenbaum, o Tannenbaum,
Wie treu sind deine Blätter.

O Tannenbaum, o Tannenbaum,
Du kannst mir sehr gefallen;
Wie oft hat nicht zur Weihnachtszeit
Ein Baum von dir mich hoch erfreut.
O Tannenbaum, o Tannenbaum,
Du kannst mir sehr gefallen.

O Tannenbaum, o Tannenbaum,
Dein Kleid will mir was lehren;
Die Hoffnung und Beständigkeit
Giebt Trost und Kraft zu jeder Zeit!
O Tannenbaum, o Tannenbaum,
Dein Kleid will mir was lehren.

Loose English translation

O Tannenbaum, O Tannenbaum,
How faithfully you blossom!
Through summer's heat and winter's chill
Your leaves are green and blooming still.
O Tannenbaum, O Tannenbaum,
How faithfully you blossom!

O Tannenbaum, O Tannenbaum,
With what delight I see you!
When winter days are dark and drear
You bring us hope for all the year.
O Tannenbaum, O Tannenbaum,
With what delight I see you!

O Tannenbaum, O Tannenbaum,
You bear a joyful message:
That faith and hope shall ever bloom
To bring us light in winter's gloom.
O Tannenbaum, O Tannenbaum,
You bear a joyful message

Another English version

O Christmas tree, O Christmas tree!
How are thy leaves so verdant!
Not only in the summertime,
But even in winter is thy prime.
O Christmas tree, O Christmas tree,
How are thy leaves so verdant!

O Christmas tree, O Christmas tree,
Much pleasure dost thou bring me!
For ev'ry year the Christmas tree,
Brings to us all both joy and glee.
O Christmas tree, O Christmas tree,
Much pleasure dost thou bring me!

O Christmas tree, O Christmas tree,
How lovely are thy branches!
Not only green when summer's here
But in the coldest time of year.
O Christmas tree, O Christmas tree,
How lovely are thy branches!

O Christmas tree, O Christmas tree,
How sturdy God hath made thee!
Thou bidd'st us all place faithfully
Our trust in God, unchangingly!
O Christmas tree, O Christmas tree,
How sturdy God hath made thee!

O Christmas tree, O Christmas tree,
Thy candles shine out brightly!
Each bough doth hold its tiny light,
That makes each toy to sparkle bright.
O Christmas tree, O Christmas tree,
Thy candles shine out brightly!

Yet another English version

O Christmas Tree, O Christmas Tree,
Your branches green delight us!
They are green when summer days are bright,
They are green when winter snow is white.
O Christmas Tree, O Christmas Tree,
Your branches green delight us!

O Christmas Tree, O Christmas Tree,
You give us so much pleasure!
How oft at Christmas tide the sight,
O green fir tree, gives us delight!
O Christmas Tree, O Christmas Tree,
You give us so much pleasure!

O Christmas Tree, O Christmas Tree
Forever true your colour.
Your boughs so green in summertime
Stay bravely green in wintertime.
O Christmas Tree, O Christmas Tree
Forever true your colour.

O Christmas Tree, O Christmas Tree
You fill my heart with music.
Reminding me on Christmas Day
To think of you and then be gay.
O Christmas Tree, O Christmas Tree
You fill my heart with music.

== Other uses ==
The tune has also been used (as a contrafactum) to carry other texts on many occasions. Notable uses include:

- "The Red Flag", anthem of the British and Irish Labour Parties
- Florida – "Florida, My Florida", former state song
- Maryland – "Maryland, My Maryland", the former state song of Maryland
- Michigan – "Michigan, My Michigan", widely believed to be the official state song
- Iowa – "The Song of Iowa", official state song
- Labrador – "Ode to Labrador", regional anthem
- Dickinson College's alma mater, "Noble Dickinsonia," with words written by Horatio Collins King.
- The College of the Holy Cross's alma mater is sung to the tune of "O Tannenbaum".
- When traveling by bus, schoolchildren in Sweden sing "En busschaufför" (Swedish for "a bus driver") or "Vår busschaufför" ("Our bus driver") to the melody.
- St. Bonaventure University's alma mater, "With Myrtle Wreath We'll Deck Thy Brow"
- Nankai University's alma mater is sung to the melody.
- St. John's University (New York City)'s alma mater is sung to the melody.
- "Scout Vespers", used by the Boy Scouts of America, "Old St. John's", is sung to the melody. Similarly, "Softly Falls" in which used by the Girl Scouts of the USA, is sung to the melody, as referenced in the song "On My Honor".
- In the 1988 film Moon over Parador, the Parador national anthem is sung to the melody.
- "Democrats, Good Democrats", an 1884 campaign song for Grover Cleveland.

== See also ==
- List of Christmas carols
- "Snoopy's Christmas" (1967), song that opens with "O Tannenbaum"
