= Georg Friedrich Daumer =

German philosopher and poet (1800–1875)

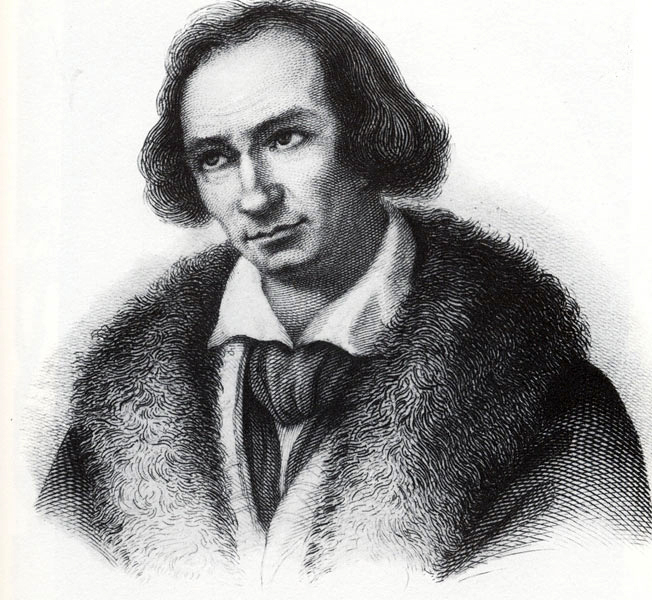
- Georg Friedrich Daumer (19th-century copperplate)
- Born: 5 March 1800; Nuremberg, Middle Franconia, Bavaria
- Died: 14 December 1875 (aged 75); Würzburg, Bavaria, German Empire
- Occupations: Poet and philosopher

Georg Friedrich Daumer (5 March 1800 – 14 December 1875) was a German poet and philosopher.

== Life ==
Daumer was educated at the gymnasium of his native city, at that time directed by the famous philosopher Hegel.

In 1817 he entered the University of Erlangen as a student of theology, but abandoned that study for philosophy. For a number of years Daumer was professor at the gymnasium of Nuremberg; owing to ill-health he was pensioned in 1832 and henceforth devoted himself entirely to literary work.

Daumer was also known as host and teacher of the mysterious foundling Kaspar Hauser in 1828-30 and wrote several books about the case.

== Philosophy ==
While at Erlangen he came strongly under the influence of Pietism. Soon, however, he became sceptical and exhibited decided leanings towards pantheism. From an orthodox Protestant he gradually became a bitter enemy of Christianity, which he attacked in a number of writings and for which he strove to substitute a new religion "of love and peace", formulated in his work Religion des neuen Weltalters (Hamburg, 1850).

Karl Marx and Frederick Engels joined in writing a critical review of Daumer's Die Religion des Neuen Weltalters in January through February 1850 which was published in the Neue Rheinische Zeitung: Politisch-Ökonomische Revue. Marx and Engels criticized Daumer's theory of history from class point of view. Instead of a struggle between economic classes in society, Daumer saw only a struggle between "coarseness" and "culture."

== Works ==
Prior to writing Die Religion des Neuen Weltalters, Daumer had published a number of works, all of a distinctly anti-theological tendency, of which the more important are: Philosophie, Religion, und Altertum (Nuremberg, 1833); Züge zu einer neuen Philosophie der Religion und Religionsgeschichte (Nuremberg, 1835); Der Feuer- und Molochdienst der Hebräer (Brunswick, 1842); Die Geheimnisse des christlichen Altertums (Hamburg, 1847). Shortly after 1850 Daumer left Nuremberg and settled at Frankfurt, where a great change soon came over him. In 1858 at Mainz he publicly embraced the Catholic faith and thenceforth became its zealous defender. Among the works written after his conversion are: Meine Konversion (Mainz, 1859); Aus der Mansarde (1860–62); Das Christentum und sein Urheber (Mainz, 1864); Das Wunder, seine Bedeutung, Wahrheit und Notwendigkeit (Ratisbon, 1874). The last mentioned work is directed expressly against the opinions of David Strauss.

One of the most important parts of Daumer's work is his poetry. His Hafis (Hamburg, 1846; a second collection, 1852) contain graceful but very free imitations of the songs of the famous Persian poet. Some of them have become widely known through the musical settings of Brahms, such as the Liebeslieder and Neue Liebeslieder Waltzes. Other composers, including Elise Schmezer, have also set Daumer’s texts to music. This collection, as well as Mahomed und sein Werk (Hamburg, 1848), is distinctly directed against the hypocrisy and asceticism which at that time Daumer believed to be inseparable from orthodox Christianity. Among other poems may be mentioned: Glorie der heiligen Jungfrau Maria (Nuremberg, 1841); Frauenbilder und Huldigungen (Leipzig, 1853); Marianische Legenden und Gedichte (Munster, 1859) and Schöne Seelen (Mainz, 1862).
