= Mehmke =

- Ortsteil of Diesdorf
- Interactive map of Mehmke
- Location within Germany Location within Saxony-Anhalt
- Coordinates: 52°43′36″N 10°57′12″E
- Country: Germany
- State: Saxony-Anhalt
- District: Altmarkkreis Salzwedel
- Municipality: Diesdorf

Area
  - Total: 16.69 km^{2} (6.44 sq mi)
- Elevation: 65 m (213 ft)

Population (2009-12-31)
  - Total: 284
  - Density: 17.0/km^{2} (44.1/sq mi)
- Time zone: UTC+01:00 (CET)
  - Summer (DST): UTC+02:00 (CEST)
- Postal codes: 29413
- Dialling codes: 039003
- Vehicle registration: SAW
- Website: www.beetzendorf-diesdorf.de

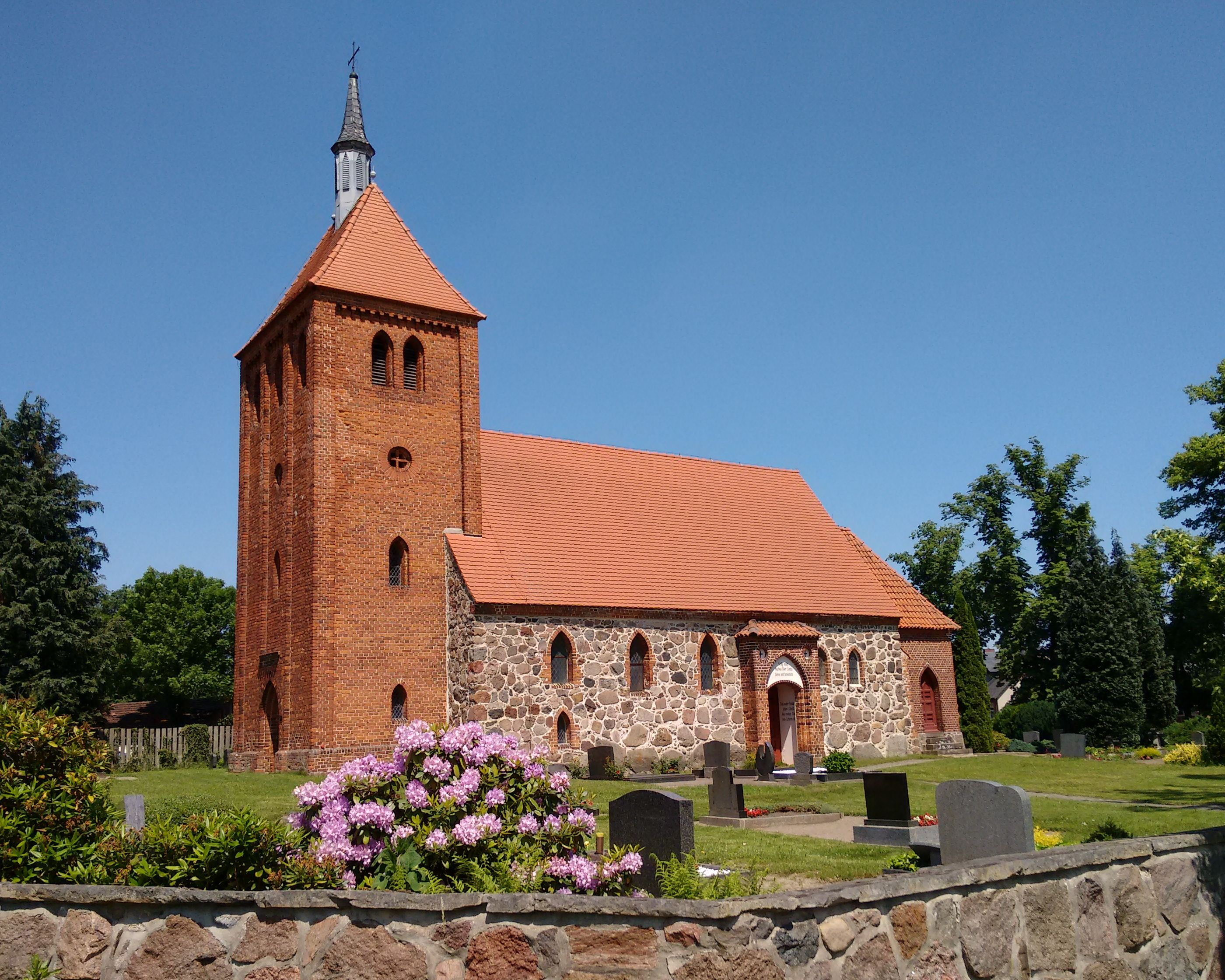
Church

Mehmke is a village and a former municipality in the district Altmarkkreis Salzwedel, in Saxony-Anhalt, Germany. Since 1 September 2010, it is part of the municipality Diesdorf.
