= Ernst Anschütz =

German composer and poet (1780–1861)

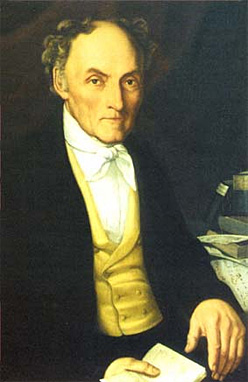
Ernst Anschütz

Ernst Gebhard Salomon Anschütz (28 October 1780 in Goldlauter near Suhl, Electorate of Saxony – 18 December 1861 (other sources: 11 December 1861) in Leipzig) was a German teacher, organist, poet, and composer. He is also known for his account of the death of Johann Christian Woyzeck in 1824 (see: Georg Büchner's play Woyzeck). Anschütz worked as a teacher in Leipzig for 50 years.

== Works ==
- "Alle Jahre wieder"; 1837; Text: Wilhelm Hey
- "Es klappert die Mühle am rauschenden Bach" (text, c. 1824); music: Carl Reinecke (1824–1910) as "Die Mühle", Op. 91, in Kinderlieder. Based on "Es zogen drei Reiter zum Tore hinaus" (c. 1770)
- "Fuchs, du hast die Gans gestohlen" (text, 1824)
- "O Tannenbaum" (text, 1824)
