= Royal Warehouse =

The Royal Warehouse (Königliche Lagerhaus) was one of the most important wool factories in the 18th century Kingdom of Prussia. It was founded in 1713 by banker and entrepreneur Johann Andreas Kraut. It was located in the Hohe Haus on the Klosterstraße in Berlin-Mitte. At times it employed the entire cloth-making trade in Berlin. and for a long time was the biggest business in Berlin.

It spent its early years in deficit, but these profitability problems were overcome thanks to typical mercantilist measures such as import restrictions on foreign fabrics, an export ban on raw wool, and a monopoly on providing the Prussian Army's equipment.

Due to changing ownership structures and competition from domestic silk and cotton production, the company's development stagnated despite its monopoly. The warehouse's products were increasingly considered too expensive relative to their quality. The company finally went bankrupt at the beginning of the 19th century.

== Bibliography (in German) ==
- Erika Herzfeld: Preußische Manufakturen. Grossgewerbliche Fertigung von Porzellan, Seide, Gobelins, Uhren, Tapeten, Waffen, Papier u. a. im 17. und 18. Jahrhundert in und um Berlin. Bayreuth, Verlag der Nation 1994, ISBN 3-373-00119-6.
- Industrie- und Handelskammer (ed.): Berlin und seine Wirtschaft. Ein Weg aus der Geschichte in die Zukunft, Lehren und Erkenntnisse. Walter de Gruyter Verlag, Berlin u. a. 1987, ISBN 3-11-011152-7.
- Ingrid Mittenzwei, Erika Herzfeld: Brandenburg-Preußen 1648 bis 1789. Das Zeitalter des Absolutismus in Text und Bild. Verlag der Nation, Berlin 1987, ISBN 3-373-00004-1.
- Helga Schulz: Berlin 1650–1800. Sozialgeschichte einer Residenz. Akademie Verlag, Berlin 1987, ISBN 3-05-000310-3.
