= Liebeslieder Waltzes (Brahms) =

Collection of waltz songs by Johannes Brahms

- by Johannes Brahms
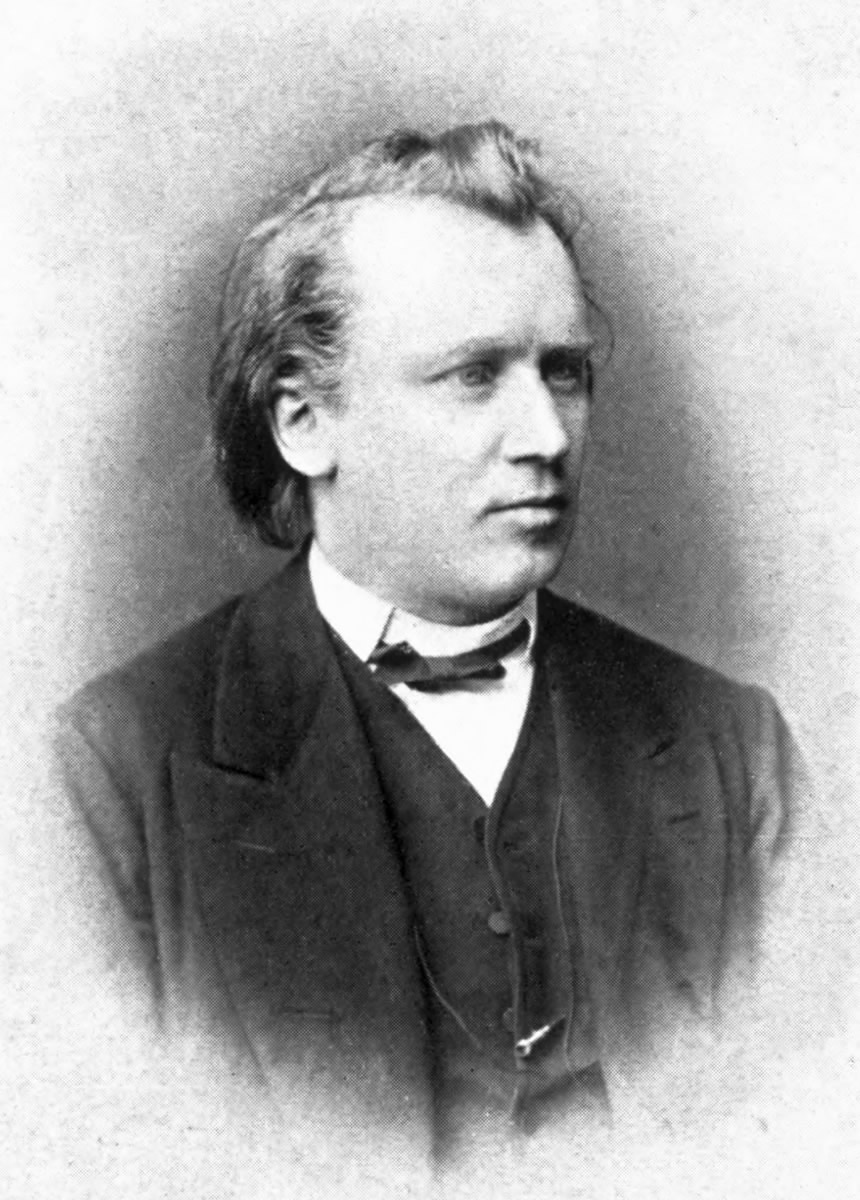
- The composer ca. 1872
- English: Liebeslieder Waltzes
- Opus: 52
- Text: from Polydora by Georg Friedrich Daumer
- Language: German
- Composed: 1868
- Movements: 18
- Scoring: four vocal parts and four-hand piano

Johannes Brahms' Liebeslieder Waltzes (Liebeslieder-Walzer) are distributed across two opus numbers: Op. 52 and Op. 65 (Neue Liebeslieder). The waltzes are a collection of love songs in Ländler style for voices and piano four hands. The lyrics for the Liebeslieder come from Georg Friedrich Daumer's Polydora, a collection of folk songs and love poems. While there is no concrete record indicating the exact inspiration for the Waltzes, there is speculation that Brahms' motivation for the songs was his frustrated love for pianist and composer Clara Schumann.

== Background ==
=== External influences ===
The discussion of influence as it pertains to Brahms and the Liebeslieder Walzer Op. 52 refers to the inspiration that a composer draws from an admired predecessor, which was commonplace among writers, artists, and composers of the 19th century. To contextualize influence, many relevant theorists will cite Harold Bloom, author of The Anxiety of Influence. According to Hussey, Bloom asserts, "all poets must deal with the anxiety that they feel toward their most admired predecessors. The predecessor, whose work inspired the later poet to pursue literary composition, is now the object of both envy and admiration from the later poet, who fears the precursor has left nothing else to be said". In other words, composers feel a more urgent need to create original work that equals the merit of those of the preceding tradition. Rosen refers to Brahms as a "master of allusion" to other composers, further arguing that one cannot begin to understand Brahms's work without an awareness of the contributing influences, which were a "necessary fact of creative life" for the composer.

One composer in particular who influenced Brahms, specifically within the Liebeslieder Walzer Op. 52 was Franz Schubert. Brahms's admiration of Schubert becomes apparent when looking at early performances of Schubert's pieces and the tendency to study, at length, the composer's works. According to Brodbeck, Schubert influenced Brahms's Liebeslieder Walzer Op. 52 through similarities to the Twenty Ländler. First, Brahms sought to have his waltzes performed in informal musical evening settings similar to those intended for Schubert's dances. Another reference to Schubert is the "Im ländler tempo" marking in Op. 52, alluding to the Twenty Ländler directly. Furthermore, the date of composition of the Liebeslieder Walzer's composition suggests that Brahms had completed the editing of the Twenty Ländler before starting his work on his own waltzes. Also, a specific request by Brahms to have each of his movements copied onto a separate sheet of paper demonstrates, to an extent, his uncertainty of how to order such seemingly unrelated pieces. This suggestion reflects a struggle similar to that which he faced in establishing an order for Schubert's dances.

Brahms's experience in editing Schubert's Twenty Ländler is important in understanding the ideas of influence relevant to 19th century composers. This experience was merely editorial, as Brahms used his own "compositional and aesthetic preferences" to organize pieces that "Schubert never intended to be performed together" into a coherent order. Due to the initial, unrelated nature of these dances, Brahms was able to extend the work of an admired predecessor by, in a sense, making original work out of those pieces which already existed, therefore reverting the direction of influence from successor back to predecessor. However, as Brahms shifts from editor of the Twenty Ländler to composer of the Liebeslieder Walzer Op. 52, he replicates his editorial behavior by composing eighteen movements that seemed to function autonomously. Brahms ordered them into a whole piece that is a sum of what were, initially, unrelated parts. This behavior, as it relates to the Twenty Ländler and the Liebeslieder Walzer Op. 52, allows Brahms to give what theorist Bloom would believe to be "deeper meaning" to his editorial and compositional work through establishing a clear, influential relationship between the two works through their similarity. In addition, this accomplishes the challenges of originality and creativity that composers faced from their talented predecessors, relieving Bloom's so-called "anxiety of influence". Overall, external influence from the Twenty Ländler not only shaped the Liebeslieder Walzer from a compositional perspective, but also added a sense of depth, significance, and credibility to Brahms's repertoire.

== Reception ==
=== Historical ===
In his lifetime, Brahms was well respected, which is particularly due to his works composed between 1863 and 1871, or his "unsettled years," before he established his residence in Vienna. The Liebeslieder Waltzes were completed in 1869 and were first performed January 5, 1870. One of the earlier reviews from London in 1877 suggest that the audience greatly enjoyed Brahms' work. Although there were initial criticisms regarding the "ad libitum" of voices and "lack of melodic flow" through the eighteen movements, the London concert of the Liebeslieder Waltzes went on to be among the most liked performances of the year One aspect of the Liebeslieder Waltzes that possibly contributed to the work's reception was that Brahms composed them with reference to Johann Strauss who was considered the "Waltz King." With such another well-known composer attached to the work the audience would have enjoyed the tribute. To some, Brahms revived chamber music. Liebeslieder exemplifies this in both Op. 52 and Brahms' later arrangement for four-hand piano, Op. 52a, written and premiered in 1874. Other arrangements of the Liebeslieder Waltzes appear in 1870 when Brahms was pressured by Ernst Rudorff to create an orchestral arrangement, which he premiered on March 19, 1870. It contained eight pieces from Op. 52 and one piece that was later included in the Neue Liebeslieder, Op. 65. The orchestral version was not published until 1938. Brahms referred to the Liebeslieder as "pretty concert numbers" in a letter written to his publisher, Fritz Simrock, in 1870.

=== Current ===
The Liebeslieder Waltzes continue to be performed quite frequently. The "ad libitum" of the original score allows for different ensemble sizes to perform the Liebeslieder Waltzes Op. 52 as opposed to the Liebeslieder Waltzes, Op. 65, which is usually performed solely by a choir; there is also versatility found in the opus with the four-hand arrangement of Liebeslieder Waltzes Opus 52a and the elimination of a vocal ensemble. The sixth and eleventh movements are some of the better-known pieces from the work due to their adaptation to choral works.

The Liebeslieder Waltzes suit current day audiences because of the brevity of the movements along with the novelty of the work within Brahms' outpourings. The movements are all relatively short and encompass a variety of emotions and moods. It also is a distinct piece since Brahms did not regularly compose for small vocal ensembles and piano. Brahms usually wrote vocal – particularly choral – pieces for choir and organ or choir and orchestra, thus the presence of a piano accompaniment in the Liebeslieder Waltzes adds to the uniqueness of the piece.

== Musical components ==
The Liebeslieder Waltzes are a collection of love songs written in a popular style that do not lose Brahms' compositional complexity. Scored for piano four hands and voices ad libitum, the piece can easily accommodate many different sized ensembles. The words are taken from Daumer's Polydora, also the material for the Neue Liebeslieder Waltzes, Op. 65. Although today they are part of the standard choral repertoire, Brahms more likely intended them to be played in parlors or informal home gatherings rather than in concert halls. Immediately successful, these waltzes were responsible for much of his personal wealth, and solidified his reputation with the general music-buying public in Vienna and Europe.

=== Table ===
Liebeslieder Walzer, Op. 52
Title	Tempo	Form	Voices	Key	Approximate duration
1. Rede, Mädchen	Im Ländler-Tempo	Rounded binary	SATB	E major	1:20
2. Am Gesteine rauscht die Flut		Binary	SATB	A minor	0:45
3. O die Frauen		Binary	TB	B♭ major	1:00
4. Wie des Abends schöne Röte		Binary	SA	F major	0:50
5. Die grüne Hopfenranke		Binary	SATB	A minor	1:45
6. Ein kleiner, hübscher Vogel	Grazioso	Rondo	SATB	A major	2:35
7. Wohl schön bewandt war es		Binary	S(A)	C minor	1:10
8. Wenn so lind dein Auge mir		Binary	SATB	A♭ major	1:30
9. Am Donaustrande		Rounded binary	SATB	E major	2:10
10. O wie sanft die Quelle		Binary	SATB	G major	0:55
11. Nein, es ist nicht auszukommen		Rounded binary	SATB	C minor	0:52
12. Schlosser auf, und mache Schlösser		Binary	SATB	C minor	0:45
13. Vögelein durchrauscht die Luft		Binary	SA	A♭ major	0:45
14. Sieh, wie ist die Welle klar		Binary	TB	E♭ major	0:50
15. Nachtigall, sie singt so schön		Binary	SATB	A♭ major	1:20
16. Ein dunkeler Schacht ist Liebe	Lebhaft (lively)	Binary	SATB	F minor	1:20
17. Nicht wandle, mein Licht	Mit Ausdruck (with expression)	Binary	T	D♭ major	1:55
18. Es bebet das Gesträuche	Lebhaft (lively)	Rounded Binary	SATB	D♭/C♯ major	1:25

=== Rhythm ===
The set opens with the quintessential waltz rhythm: the "oom-pah-pah" of the bass note played on beat one followed the chord on beats two and three. Brahms never strays too far from this familiar idiom, and the simple, easy to sing folk melodies allow his work to stay grounded as he adds more rhythmic complexity. Brahms is known for his unique manipulation of time, particularly his use of syncopation and hemiolas. This begins right away as a subtle hemiola creeps into the first stanza. Waltz 2 broadens this with a hemiola lasting throughout the song: the piano plays a 3/4 accompaniment to the 3/2 melody in the tenor. In waltzes 8, 10, 13, and 15, lines are barred to imply a different meter than the standard 3/4 waltz meter Brahms used as a template.

Another time manipulation used here is his metric displacement, or the shift away from an established barline. This very subtle alteration is seen most notably fifth waltz, where the second piano part begins on the anacrusis with two descending quarter notes. This pattern of emphasis on the third beat continues as the primo piano enters. When the voices finally enter with an emphasis on beat one, the listener's perception of the barline shifts. The quarter note-half note pattern that waltz 5 is built upon is commonly used by Brahms, usually to symbolize the loneliness of separation. This pattern appears periodically throughout the set, for instance making up much of waltz 7.

=== Ordering ===
Brahms wrote the waltzes quickly in summer 1869 as an unordered set of dances, with little regard for their ultimate arrangement. Likely he thought a home performer would simply pick and choose their favorites to be performed. The uncertainty of the ordering, grouping, and number of volumes lead to lengthy correspondence with his publisher, Simrock, with changes made up until the first performance, and within his own copy of the published first edition.

The waltzes exist today in a single set of 18, but it is evident that Brahms made accommodations for the possibility of two books of nine waltzes, or even three books of six waltzes, giving numbers 6, 9, and 18 a particular sense of closure in their phrasing, gestures, and structure. Along with the opening dance and number 11, these three are the only waltzes in the set to introduce a more complex formal structure. 1, 9, and 18 are in rounded binary form and 6 is a rondo, while the rest of the Liebeslieder adhere to the simpler binary form more often found in folk-song transcriptions. The longer, more structured patterns give a sense of drama befitting a closing number, particularly (as in 6) when they end with a satisfying return to the home key. The closing gestures are most apparent in 9, which would have served as an ending in both the two-book and three-book versions of the set (in his tripartite plan, Brahms reordered the middle book to close with 9). This was also the waltz that Brahms chose to end his arrangement for choir and orchestra. The waltz returns to E major, the key that started the set, and ends with a descending melodic line, a decrescendo, ritardando, and a fermata, all things that unmistakably signify an ending.

=== Versions ===
Due to the piece's popularity and playability, many versions and transcriptions of the Libeslieder Waltzes exist. Opus 52a, for piano duet without voices was published in 1874, with minor additions and intricacies added to the original piano lines. Brahms also published a version for voices with piano solo in 1875. Conductor Ernst Rudorff convinced Brahms to create an arrangement of the waltzes for voice and small orchestra for a performance in 1870, although this version was not published until 1938. The orchestral version does not contain the complete set of waltzes, but instead numbers 1, 2, 4, 6, 5, a song that would later become waltz 9 in his Neue Liebeslieder Waltzes, 11, 8, and 9. Friedrich Hermann also created a transcription of the Liebeslieder Waltzes for strings alone in 1889. In 2019, the Liebeslieder Waltzes, op. 52, received a new orchestration of the 4-hand accompaniment. This version is for choir and 10 instrumentalists. Composed by J. A. Kawarsky, it is published by GIA press.

Ref. Bibl. Marina Caracciolo, "Brahms e il Walzer. Storia e lettura critica". Lucca, Libreria Musicale Italiana, 2004, ISBN 978-88-7096-362-5

== Ballet/modern dance versions ==
In 1960, New York City Ballet premiered George Balanchine's Liebeslieder Walzer, choreographed to Brahms's opuses 52 and 65.

The American modern-dance choreographer Mark Morris created his own realization of opus 65, titled "New Love Song Waltzes," in 1982. In 1989, he followed this up with "Love Song Waltzes," set to opus 52.
