= Neue Liebeslieder =

- Part songs by Johannes Brahms
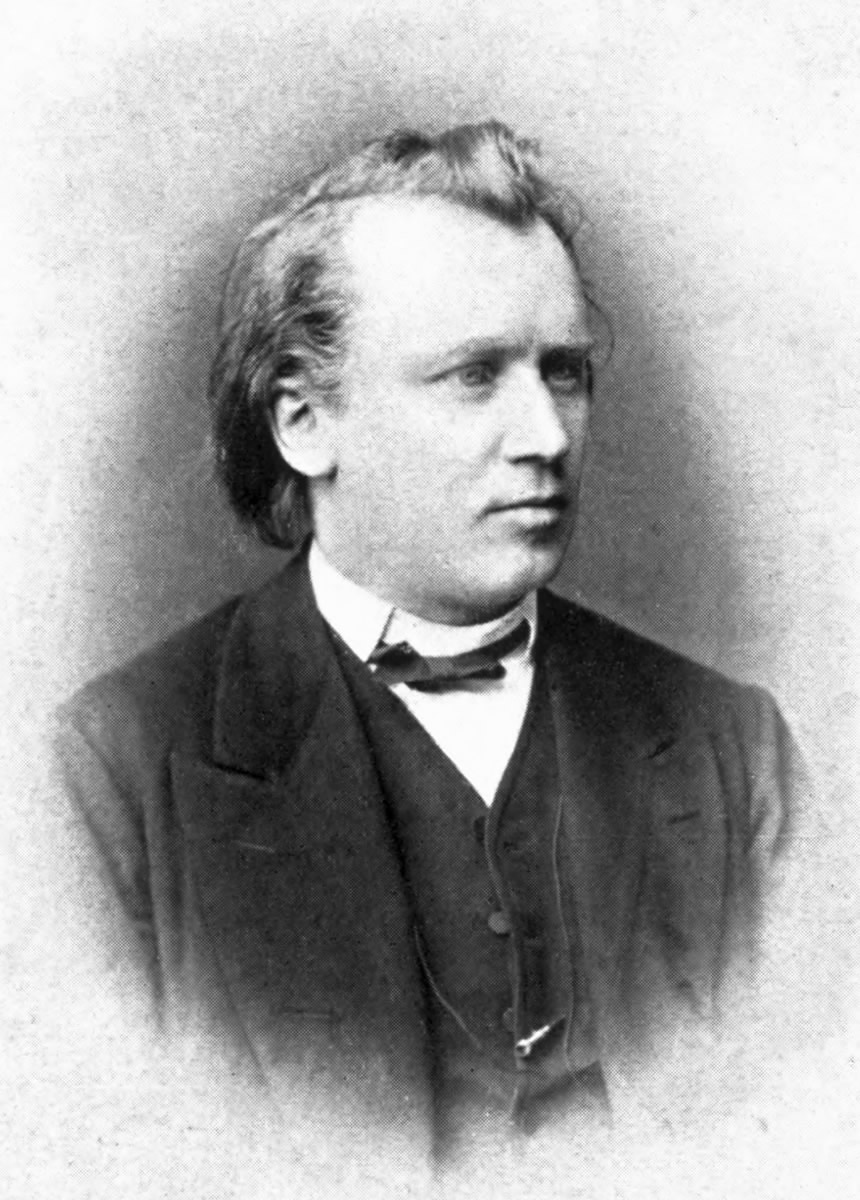
- The composer ca. 1872
- English: New love songs
- Opus: 65
- Text: Folk songs
- Language: German
- Composed: 1869–1874
- Movements: 15
- Scoring: four vocal parts and four-hand piano

Neue Liebeslieder (New Love Songs), Op. 65, written by Johannes Brahms, is a collection of Romantic pieces written for four solo voices and four hands on the piano. They are also known as Neue Liebesliederwalzer. Neue Liebeslieder were written during the Romantic period between 1869 and 1874. The text of the songs is adapted from folk songs of various areas of Europe including Turkey, Poland, Latvia and Sicily. The text for songs 1 through 14 were translated and compiled by Georg Friedrich Daumer in his poem series, Polydora; the text for the fifteenth and final song, entitled "Zum Schluß" ("In Conclusion"), was written by Johann Wolfgang von Goethe.

Neue Liebeslieder were written following the success of the popular Liebeslieder Waltzes, Op. 52.

== Musical aspects ==
The Neue Liebeslieder differs from the earlier Liebeslieder in that only seven of its 15 songs are for the ensemble quartet, while seven others are solo songs for individual members of the quartet, and one is for a duo.

Throughout the quartet songs, Brahms uses innovative techniques to portray a central idea. For example, in the first song, measures 16–21, he depicts the rocky shores by the repeated cry of "zertrümmert", which in English means "wrecked". Brahms also enhances the text "Well auf Well" ("wave after wave") with octave leaps in all four parts in measure 4 and 29. In No. 8, Brahms's use of the musical rest in the middle of the words mixed with the chorus singing dolce helps to create a gentle atmosphere.

The seven solo songs and one duet differ from the quartet songs in that the soloists illustrate different characters who behave in certain ways when it comes to love. The soprano is a female who continuously has no luck when it comes to men; the alto is depicted as a female who has suddenly abandoned her lover; the tenor is portrayed as a male who is selfish and irresponsible when it comes to sexual relationships with women; and the bass is one who is hopelessly in love with his married lover.

The final song in this cycle, "Zum Schluß", written for the entire vocal quartet, moves away from the subject of lovers and puts the spotlight on the muses and thanks them for inspiring not only the author (Goethe), but also all of the artists in the world. With this change in subject comes the change in meter. When Brahms changes the standard 3/4 meter to 9/4, the nine beats are grouped into three groups of three; thus, it is a waltz within a waltz. In addition, "Zum Schluß" has a Baroque influence in two respects: the music is much more contrapuntal than the previous songs in this cycle, and the song is actually a passacaglia, with the theme (F–C–B♭–A–D–C) running throughout the outer sections. At the climax of this song in measure 16, the piano drops out and the choir sings a cappella and moves from the dominant key back to the tonic key of F major. J. A. Fuller Maitland, in Grove's Dictionary, wrote:

One of the most beautiful of all the quartets not in waltz-rhythm, is the epilogue to the second set of ‘Neue Liebeslieder’, a true lyric for four voices, with a gentler style of accompaniment than is provided for the rest. (Maitland 1904, 390)

It is self-evident that Zum Schluß, whose text and music are in stark contrast to all of the other waltzes in both Op. 52 and Op. 65, is a personal statement by Brahms, who throughout the troubled relationships in his life (sich Jammer und Glück wechseln in liebender Brust) found solace in music (Linderung kommt einzig, ihr [Musen], von euch).

== Ballet/modern dance versions ==
In 1960, New York City Ballet premiered George Balanchine's Liebeslieder Walzer, choreographed to Brahms' opuses 52 and 65..

The American modern-dance choreographer Mark Morris presented his own realization of opus 65, titled "New Love Song Waltzes," in 1982. In 1989, he followed this up with "Love Song Waltzes," set to opus 52.

== See also ==
- Zigeunerlieder (Brahms)
- Hungarian Dances (Brahms)
