= List of 2000s ballet premieres =

This is a list of ballet premieres in the 2000s, by year.

== 2000 ==
| title | choreographer | composer | company | venue | date |
|---|---|---|---|---|---|
| Appalachia Waltz | Miriam Mahdaviani | Edgar Meyer and Mark O'Connor | New York City Ballet | New York State Theater | Wednesday, June 20 |
| The Car Man | Matthew Bourne | Rodion Shchedrin | Adventures in Motion Pictures | Theatre Royal, Plymouth | Tuesday, May 16 |
| Mercurial Manoeuvres | Christopher Wheeldon | Dmitri Shostakovich | New York City Ballet | New York State Theater | Friday, April 28 |
| Tributary | Robert La Fosse and Robert Garland | Wolfgang Amadeus Mozart | New York City Ballet | New York State Theater | Thursday, May 25 |
| Triptych | Christopher d'Amboise | Béla Bartók | New York City Ballet | New York State Theater | Wednesday, June 7 |

== 2001 ==
| Title | Choreographer | Composer | Company | Venue | Date |
|---|---|---|---|---|---|
| Polyphonia | Christopher Wheeldon | György Ligeti | New York City Ballet | New York State Theatre | January 4 |
| Hallelujah Junction | Peter Martins | John Adams | Royal Danish Ballet | Copenhagen | June 24 |

== 2002 ==
| title | choreographer | composer | company | venue or presentation | date |
|---|---|---|---|---|---|
| Carousel | Christopher Wheeldon | Richard Rodgers | New York City Ballet | New York State Theater | November 26 |
| In the Mi(d)st | Miriam Mahdaviani | Oliver Knussen | New York City Ballet | Diamond Project | June 21 |
| Vespro | Mauro Bigonzetti | Bruno Moretti | New York City Ballet | Diamond Project | May 8 |

== 2003 ==
| title | choreographer | composer | company | venue | date |
|---|---|---|---|---|---|
| Carnival of the Animals | Christopher Wheeldon | Camille Saint-Saëns | New York City Ballet | New York State Theater | May 14 |
| Liturgy | Christopher Wheeldon | Arvo Pärt | New York City Ballet | New York State Theater | May 31 |
| Octet | Peter Martins | Felix Mendelssohn | Royal Danish Ballet | Royal Danish Theatre | November 14 |
| Thou Swell | Peter Martins | Richard Rodgers | New York City Ballet | New York State Theater | January 22 |
| Wild Swans | Meryl Tankard | Elena Kats-Chernin | Australian Ballet | Sydney Opera House | April 29 |

== 2004 ==
| title | choreographer | composer | company | venue | date |
|---|---|---|---|---|---|
| Double Feature | Susan Stroman | Irving Berlin and Walter Donaldson | New York City Ballet | New York State Theater | January 23 |
| Chichester Psalms | Peter Martins | Leonard Bernstein | New York City Ballet | New York State Theater | June 2 |
| Backchat | Eliot Feld | Paul Lansky | Ballet Tech | Joyce Theater | October 21 |

== 2005 ==
| title | choreographer | composer | company | venue | date |
|---|---|---|---|---|---|
| After the Rain | Christopher Wheeldon | Arvo Pärt | New York City Ballet | New York State Theater | January 22 |
| An American in Paris | Christopher Wheeldon | George Gershwin | New York City Ballet | New York State Theater | May 4 |
| Anna Karenina | Boris Eifman | Pyotr Ilyich Tchaikovsky | Eifman Ballet | Saint Petersburg | April 2 |
| Tribute | Christopher d'Amboise | Johann Sebastian Bach | School of American Ballet | Juilliard Theater | June 4 |

== 2006 ==
| title | choreographer | composer | company | venue or presentation | date |
|---|---|---|---|---|---|
| Friandises | Peter Martins | Christopher Rouse | New York City Ballet | New York State Theater | February 10 |
| Afternoon of a Faun | Tim Rushton | Claude Debussy | Kings of the Dance | New York City Center | February 23 |
| In Vento | Mauro Bigonzetti | Bruno Moretti | New York City Ballet | Diamond Project | May 4 |
| Two Birds with the Wings of One | Jean-Pierre Bonnefoux | Bright Sheng | New York City Ballet | Diamond Project | May 25 |
| Russian Seasons | Alexei Ratmansky | Leonid Desyatnikov | New York City Ballet | Diamond Project | June 8 |
| Slice to Sharp | Jorma Elo | Heinrich Ignaz Franz von Biber and Antonio Vivaldi | New York City Ballet | New York State Theater | June 16 |
| Chroma | Wayne McGregor | Joby Talbot | The Royal Ballet | Royal Opera House | November 17 |

== 2007 ==
| title | choreographer | composer | company | venue | date |
|---|---|---|---|---|---|
| Romeo † Juliet | Peter Martins | Béla Bartók | New York City Ballet | New York State Theater | May 1 |
| The Nightingale and the Rose | Christopher Wheeldon | Bright Sheng | New York City Ballet | New York State Theater | June 8 |
| Grazioso | Peter Martins | Mikhail Glinka | New York City Ballet | New York State Theater | November 20 |
| Franca Florio, regina di Palermo | Luciano Cannito | Lorenzo Ferrero | Teatro Massimo | Teatro Massimo | November 22 |

== 2008 ==
| title | choreographer | composer | company | venue or presentation | date |
|---|---|---|---|---|---|
| Oltremare | Mauro Bigonzetti | Bruno Moretti | New York City Ballet | New York State Theater | January 23 |
| Rococo Variations | Christopher Wheeldon | PI Tschaikovsky | New York City Ballet | New York State Theater | February 7 |
| Concerto DSCH | Alexei Ratmansky | Dmitri Shostakovich | New York City Ballet | New York State Theater | May 29 |
| Rogue and Rabbit | Twyla Tharp | Danny Elfman | American Ballet Theatre | Metropolitan Opera House | June 3 |
| Flit of Fury/The Monarch | Adam Hendrickson | Aaron Severini | New York City Ballet | Dancers' Choice benefit | June 27 |
| Commedia | Christopher Wheeldon | Igor Stravinsky | Morphoses/The Wheeldon Company | New York City Center | October 1 |
| Romeo and Juliet | Krzysztof Pastor | Sergei Prokofiev | Scottish Ballet | Edinburgh Festival Theatre | |
| Within the Golden Hour | Christopher Wheeldon | Ezio Bosso; Antonio Vivaldi | San Francisco Ballet | War Memorial Opera House | |

== 2009 ==
| title | choreographer | composer | company | venue | date |
|---|---|---|---|---|---|
| Lifecasting | Douglas Lee | Ryoji Ikeda and Steve Reich | New York City Ballet | David H. Koch Theater | Thursday, January 22 |
| Simple Symphony | Melissa Barak | Benjamin Britten | New York City Ballet | David H. Koch Theater | Tuesday, February 17 |
