= Correlazione =

Ballet made by Miriam Mahdaviani

Correlazione is a ballet made by Miriam Mahdaviani for New York City Ballet's Diamond Project II to Corelli's concerti grossi, Op. 6, No. 1 in D major, No. 3 in C minor, No. 8 in G minor (Christmas Concerto), and to the Sonata for Violin Op. 5, No. 12 in D minor (La follia). The premiere took place 26 May 1994 at the New York State Theater, Lincoln Center.

== Original cast ==
- Yvonne Borree
- Jenifer Ringer
- Albert Evans
- Arch Higgins

== Articles ==
- May 15, 1994 article by Jennifer Dunning, The New York Times

== Reviews ==
- May 28, 1994 review by Anna Kisselgoff, The New York Times
- January 25, 1995 review by Anna Kisselgoff, The New York Times
- May 28, 1996 review by Jack Anderson, The New York Times
- January 14, 1997 review by Jack Anderson, The New York Times
- May 6, 2002 review by Anna Kisselgoff, The New York Times
