= Double Feature (ballet) =

Double Feature (A Ballet in Two Acts) was choreographed by Susan Stroman for the New York City Ballet to music by Irving Berlin and Walter Donaldson. The libretto is by Ms. Stroman and Glen Kelly, with orchestrations by Doug Besterman and arrangement by Mr. Kelly; the libretto for "Makin' Whoopee!" is based on the play Seven Chances, variously attributed to Roi Cooper Megris and David Belasco. The premiere took place on 23 January 2004 at the New York State Theater, Lincoln Center, with scenery by Robin Wagner, costumes by William Ivey Long, and lighting by Mark Stanley.

== The Blue Necklace ==
=== Music: Irving Berlin ===
- Alexander's Ragtime Band
- Always, What'll I Do?
- How About Me?
- Slumming on Park Avenue
- Let Yourself Go
- Everybody's Doin' It Now
- All Alone
- The Best Things Happen While You're Dancing
- Mandy
- Steppin' Out with My Baby
- You're Easy to Dance With
- No Strings
- How Deep is the Ocean

=== Blue Necklace original cast ===
- Maria Kowroski
- Kyra Nichols
- Ashley Bouder
- Megan Fairchild
- Jason Fowler
- Damian Woetzel

== Makin' Whoopee ==
=== Music: Walter Donaldson ===
- Makin' Whoopee!
- My Baby Just Cares for Me
- Borneo
- Reaching for Someone
- My Buddy
- My Blue Heaven
- The Daughter of Rosie O'Grady
- He's the Last Word
- You
- Romance
- Love Me or Leave Me
- Yes Sir! That's My Baby
- Carolina in the Morning

=== Makin' Whoopee original cast ===
- Alexandra Ansanelli
- Tom Gold
- Albert Evans
- Arch Higgins
- Seth Orza

== Articles ==
- NY Times by Jennifer Dunning, September 9, 2007
- NY Times by Jack Anderson, January 27, 2008
- Gurewitsch, Matthew (January 18, 2004). "George Balanchine, Musical Comedian?". The New York Times.

== Reviews ==
- NY Times by Anna Kisselgoff, January 26, 2004
- NY Times, John Rockwell, February 21, 2005
- NY Times, Jack Anderson, February 26, 2005
- NY Times, Jennifer Dunning, February 2, 2008
