= Images (ballet) =

Images is a ballet made by Miriam Mahdaviani for the New York City Ballet's first Diamond Project to Debussy's "Gigues" from Images pour orchestre (1906–12) and "Nuages" and "Fêtes" from his Nocturnes (1893–99). The premiere took place 30 May 1992 at the New York State Theater, Lincoln Center.

== Original cast ==
- Samantha Allen
- Elizabeth Drucker
- Romy Karz
- Julie Michael
- Teresa Reyes
- Albert Evans
- Arch Higgins
- Ben Huys
- Jerome Kipper
- Sean Savoye
- Runsheng Ying

== Articles ==
- May 24, 1992 Jack Anderson, NY Times

== Reviews ==
- June 1, 1992 Anna Kisselgoff, NY Times
- February 13, 1993 Jack Anderson, NY Times
