= Amedeo Amodio =

Italian choreographer and ballet dancer (born 1940)

- Born: 1940 (age 85–86); Milan, Lombardia, Italy
- Known for: Choreography

Amedeo Amodio (born 1940) is an Italian choreographer and former ballet dancer. Trained at the Teatro alla Scala where he performed notably with Carla Fracci, he was appointed artistic director of the Reggio Emilia based modern ballet company Aterballetto in 1979 and served in that role until 1996. Most recently, in 2003, he accepted a position as artistic director of the ballet company at Teatro Massimo in Palermo, Sicily.

== Early career ==
Born in Milan in 1940, Amodio trained at the ballet school of the Teatro alla Scala, whose ranks he joined immediately. While there, he performed in productions by Léonide Massine (Il cappello a tre punte, Capriccio spagnolo, Fantasmi al Grand Hotel), George Balanchine (Sinfonia in Do, I quattro temperamenti), and Petit (Le quattro stagioni, Le jeune homme et la mort, La chambre, Le loup).

At the age of 22, he left the company of the Teatro alla Scala to begin his career as a choreographer and free-lancing dancer, which led him to pivotal collaborations with Hermes Pan, who chose him as lead in the Italian TV production Studio Uno, and with Aurel Milloss at the Teatro dell'Opera di Roma.

He frequently returned to the Teatro alla Scala, where he performed with Carla Fracci in productions of Il gabbiano and Pelléas et Mélisande. In 1973, he was featured with Fracci in a documentary that was screened on the RAI television network in Italy. Excerpts from Prokofiev's Romeo & Juliet, Offenbach's Cancan and Tchaikovsky's Sleeping Beauty were shown.

In 1975, Amodio signed his version of the Après-midi d'un phaune for the Spoleto Festival dei Due Mondi, which was then offered in reprise at the Teatro alla Scala with Luciana Savignano and scenes by Giacomo Manzù. In the same year and for this latter company, he also created Ricercare a nove movimenti.

== Aterballetto ==
After appearing in two movies by Liliana Cavani, The Night Porter (Il portiere di notte) in 1974, and Beyond Good and Evil (Al di là del bene e del male) in 1977, in 1979 he was appointed artistic director of Aterballetto, a modern ballet company created by A.T.E.R. (Associazione Teatri dell'Emilia Romagna) and based in Reggio Emilia. He directed the company until 1996. At Aterballetto, his work was considered experimental and said to be promoting new forms that were widely perceived "as the first examples of a national [Italian] form of choreography.

Having consciously decided to select 20 dancers who would be able to tackle any style of music and ballet techniques, Amodio created for them a vast repertoire that paired his own creations with those of the Pantheon of choreographers. Under his guidance, Aterballetto produced Amodio's own The Nutcracker, Naturale, Mazzapegul, Un petit train de plaisir, Coppélia, and Cabiria, while ambitiously taking on the work of masters such as Glen Tetley, Alvin Ailey, Lucinda Childs, George Balanchine, Antony Tudor, Kenneth MacMillan, José Limón, Hans van Manen, Léonide Massine, David Parsons, and Maurice Béjart.

During his tenure as Artistic Director for Aterballetto, Amodio strengthened his liaisons with noted composers and musicians, many of whom contributed original music for his creations; among them, Luciano Berio, Sylvano Bussotti, Aldo Bennici, Azio Corghi, Giuseppe Calì, Jan Garbarek, Naná Vasconcelos, and Edoardo Bennato.

Anxious to incorporate other media in his work, he elicited the artistic input of high-caliber costume and set designers (such as Emanuele Luzzati, M. Antonietta Gambaro, Luisa Spinatelli, and Maurizio Millenotti) while painters and sculptors produced unique artwork (among them, Mario Ceroli, Piero Dorazio, Lucio Del Pezzo, and Claudio Parmiggiani).

The Strange Case of Dr Jekyll and Mr Hyde was his last work created for Aterballetto, where Mauro Bigonzetti succeed him as Artistic Director.

== Later career ==
After working between 1997 and 2000 at the helm of the ballet troupe of Teatro dell'Opera di Roma, he freelanced for the Teatro Regio di Torino in Turin and the Tulsa Ballet, among others, before accepting in 2003 the artistic direction of the Teatro Massimo in Palermo, Sicily.
