= Echo (ballet) =

Echo is a ballet made by New York City Ballet ballet master (subsequently ballet master in chief) Peter Martins to Michael Torke's Slate (1989). The premiere took place on 15 June 1989 at the New York State Theater, Lincoln Center. Echo was the third in a series of collaborations between the choreographer and composer.

== Cast ==
=== Original ===
- Kyra Nichols
- Heather Watts
- Darci Kistler
- Suzanne Farrell
- Adam Luders
- Jock Soto
- Jeppe Mytskov
- Robert Hill

== See also ==
- Ash
- Black and White
- Ecstatic Orange

== Articles ==
- Sunday NY Times by Anna Kisselgoff, July 7, 1991

== Reviews ==
- NY Times by Anna Kisselgoff, June 17, 1989
- NY Times by Anna Kisselgoff, January 7, 1990
