= Appalachia Waltz (ballet) =

Appalachia Waltz is a ballet made by Miriam Mahdaviani to excerpts from Edgar Meyer and Mark O'Connor's Appalachia Waltz, which was part of New York City Ballet's Diamond Project. The premiere took place Wednesday, June 20, 2000 at the New York State Theater, Lincoln Center.

== Original cast ==
- Jenifer Ringer
- Jennie Somogyi
- Albert Evans
- Nilas Martins

== Reviews ==
- June 22, 2000 Anna Kisselgoff, NY Times
- July 9, 2000 Anna Kisselgoff, NY Times
- Perron, Wendy (June 2000). "Appalachia, Mahdaviani's Diamond Facet - ballet by Miriam Mahdaviani set to 'Appalachia Waltz' for the New York City Ballet Diamond Project". Dance Magazine. 74 (6). Archived from the original on March 9, 2007 – via FindArticles.
- 2000 Alicia Mosier, Dance Insider
- May 22, 2001 Jack Anderson, NY Times
- May 24, 2001 Jennifer Dunning, NY Times
