= Ash (ballet) =

Ash is a ballet made by New York City Ballet's ballet master in chief Peter Martins to Ash (1991) by Michael Torke. The premiere took place Thursday, June 20, 1991, at the New York State Theater, Lincoln Center. Ash was the fourth in a series of collaborations between the choreographer and composer.

== Original cast ==
- Wendy Whelan
- Yvonne Borree
- Rebecca Metzger
- Monique Meunier
- Kathleen Tracey
- Nilas Martins
- Albert Evans
- Arch Higgins
- Russell Kaiser
- Ethan Stiefel

== See also ==
- Black and White
- Echo
- Ecstatic Orange

== Articles ==
- Sunday NY Times by Anna Kisselgoff, July 7, 1991

== Reviews ==
- NY Times by Anna Kisselgoff, June 24, 1991
- NY Times by Jack Anderson, June 15, 1999
