= Vespro =

Ballet

Vespro is a ballet by Mauro Bigonzetti to eponymous music of Bruno Moretti, commissioned by New York City Ballet. The première took place Saturday, May 8, 2002, as part of Diamond Project V at the New York State Theater, Lincoln Center. Vespro is the first of three Bigonzetti / Moretti ballets commissioned by City Ballet, the others being In Vento and Oltremare.

== Original cast ==
- Alexandra Ansanelli
- Maria Kowroski
- Jason Fowler
- Sébastien Marcovici
- Benjamin Millepied

== Reception ==
In the Village Voice, the ballet's premiere at the NYBC 2002 Spring Gala was described by Deborah Jowitt as beginning "startlingly", with the male lead dancing and interacting with the on-stage piano, becoming "fascinating" as more musicians and dancers are added, but in parts feeling "long and aimless". The New York Times review of the debut found the piece "witty neo-Futurist, neo-Dada and neo-Absurdist", praising its use of musicians and dancers used in "startling supple shapes", and its "distinctive originality." In a review the following year, the Times again described the dancing as "superb" and "marvelous", calling the ballet "a creative work."
