= In Vento =

Ballet

In Vento is a ballet by Mauro Bigonzetti, artistic director of Italy's Aterballetto dance company, to eponymous music of Bruno Moretti. It was commissioned as part of New York City Ballet's Diamond Project. The premiere took place May 4, 2006, at the David H. Koch Theater, Lincoln Center. In Vento is the second of three Bigonzetti / Moretti ballets commissioned by City Ballet, the others being Vespro and Oltremare.

== Original cast ==
- Maria Kowroski
- Benjamin Millepied
- Jason Fowler

== Reviews ==
- "Dance Review - New York City Ballet Presents 'Il Vento' by Mauro Bigonzetti". New York Times. John Rockwell, May 6, 2006.
- "Confronting The Collective". New York Sun. Joel Lobenthal, May 8, 2006.
- "Jeweled Flash". Village Voice. Deborah Jowitt, May 9, 2006.
- "Diamond Project Appraised: Still Only Semiprecious". New York Observer. Robert Gottlieb, June 4, 2006.
- "Dancing - Westward Ho!". The New Yorker. Joan Acocella, July 3, 2006.
- "Dance Review - Russian, American-Style, and a Loner on a Quest". New York Times. Jennifer Dunning, January 19, 2007.
