= Ecstatic Orange =

Ecstatic Orange is a ballet made by New York City Ballet ballet master (subsequently ballet master in chief) Peter Martins to Michael Torke's Verdant Music (1985), Purple (1987) and Ecstatic Orange (1985) for City Ballet's American Music Festival; the second movement, Purple, was to a score commissioned for the occasion. The premiere of the expanded version took place on 11 June 1987 at the New York State Theater, Lincoln Center, with lighting by Mark Stanley (an earlier version appeared in January of that year.) Ecstatic Orange was the first in a series of collaborations between the choreographer and composer.

== Original cast ==
- Heather Watts
- Helene Alexopoulos
- Victoria Hall
- Jock Soto
- Peter Frame
- Mel Tomlinson

== See also ==
- Ash
- Black and White
- Echo

== Articles ==
- Sunday NY Times by Anna Kisselgoff, July 7, 1991

== Reviews ==
- NY Times by Anna Kisselgoff, January 17, 1987
- NY Times by Anna Kisselgoff, June 13, 1987
- NY Times by Jack Anderson, May 12, 1988
- NY Times by Alastair Macaulay, June 30, 2008
