= Black and White (ballet) =

Black and White is a ballet made by New York City Ballet ballet master, subsequently ballet master in chief, Peter Martins to some of Michael Torke's eponymous music which was commissioned for City Ballet's American Music Festival; the premiere took place on 7 May 1988 at the New York State Theater, Lincoln Center. Black and White was the second in a series of collaborations between the choreographer and composer.

== Original cast ==
- Heather Watts
- Jock Soto

== See also ==
- Ash
- Echo
- Ecstatic Orange

== Articles ==
- Sunday NY Times by Anna Kisselgoff, July 7, 1991

== Reviews ==
- NY Times by Anne Kisselgoff, May 9, 1988
- NY Times by Jack Anderson, February 22, 1990
