= Triptych (ballet) =

Triptych (Strings Percussion Celesta) is a ballet made by Christopher d'Amboise to Bartók's Music for Strings, Percussion and Celesta, as part of New York City Ballet's Diamond Project. The premiere took place on Wednesday, 7 June 2000 at the New York State Theater, Lincoln Center.

== Original cast ==
- Wendy Whelan
- Kristin Sloan
- Jock Soto
- Albert Evans

== Reviews ==
- Kisselgoff, Anna (June 9, 2000). "An Enigma As Cerebral As It Is Unexpected". The New York Times.
- Hering, Doris (October 2000). "Dance Magazine by Doris Hering, October 2000". Dance Magazine. 74 (10). Archived from the original on November 24, 2005 – via FindArticles.
- NY Magazine by Tobi Tobias, 3 July 2000
