= Tribute (ballet) =

Tribute is a ballet made by Christopher d'Amboise to music by Johann Sebastian Bach. The première took place Saturday, June 4, 2005, at the School of American Ballet workshop performance, Juilliard Theater, Lincoln Center for the Performing Arts. The New York City Ballet première was Sunday, February 4, 2007, at the New York State Theater, also at Lincoln Center.

== Music ==
- Well-Tempered Clavier, Book 1, Prélude in E♭ minor, BWV9 853
- Keyboard Concerto V, in F minor, 1st Movement, Allegro, BWV 1056
- Well-Tempered Clavier, Book 1, Fugue in C minor, BWV 847
- Keyboard Concerto V, in F minor, 2nd Movement Adagio', BWV 1056
- Well-Tempered Clavier, Book 1, Prélude in E minor, BWV 856
- Well-Tempered Clavier, Book 1, Prélude in D minor, BWV 851
- Oboe Concerto, in F Major, 2nd Movement, Siciliano, reconstructed from BWV 49, 169
- Keyboard Concerto, in G minor, 1st Movement, BWV 1058
- Oboe Concerto, in D minor, 2nd Movement Adagio, BWV 974 by Alessandro Marcello, arranged for piano solo by Johann Sebastian Bach

== Reviews ==
- NY Times review by Jennifer Dunning, June 8, 2005
- NY Times article by Daniel J. Wakin, August 1, 2006
- NY Times review by Gia Kourlas, January 21, 2007
