= Dance Preludes =

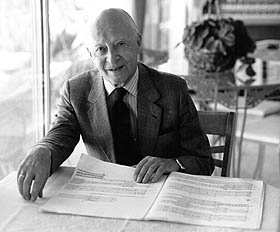
Witold Lutosławski in 1993, by Betty Freeman

Dance Preludes was a ballet made by Miriam Mahdaviani of New York City Ballet to Witold Lutosławski's 1955 music as a pièce d'occasion for the Dancers' Emergency Fund Benefit on 24 February 1991 at the New York State Theater, Lincoln Center. The program also included George Balanchine's Serenade, the pas de deux from his Theme and Variations, Robert La Fosse's Gretry Pas de Deux, Sean Lavery's Romeo and Juliet, Alexandre Proia's Salome Dances for Peace, and ended with Balanchine's Stars and Stripes.

== Original cast ==
- Wendy Whelan
- Albert Evans

== Music ==
Lutosławski composed this work for clarinet and piano in 1954. He subsequently created a version for clarinet, harp, piano, percussion, and string orchestra in 1955, and a nonet version for wind quintet, violin, viola, cello, and double bass in 1959. The second version is used in the ballet.

== Reviews ==
- Kisselgoff, Anna (February 26, 1991). "Review/Dance; New Choreography In City Ballet Finale". The New York Times.
