= Bruno Moretti =

Italian composer, pianist, and conductor (born 1957)

Bruno Moretti (born 1957) is an Italian composer, pianist, and conductor. He has composed ballet music (as well as theatre, cinema and television music) working in collaboration with the choreographer Mauro Bigonzetti. He is also an accompanist for singers.

== Biography ==
Moretti was born in Rome, and initially studied with Armando Renzi. Then he became Nino Rota's assistant for creating the opera Napoli milionaria at the Spoleto festival in 1977. Later, he studied conducting at Siena's Accademia Musicale Chigiana. He made his conducting debut in 1979 at the Teatro dell'Opera di Roma with Madama Butterfly by Giacomo Puccini. He has conducted throughout Italy and in England, Israel, the Far East and North America.

== Works ==
=== Opera ===
- Lady E (1999), opera in two acts to a libretto by Pasquale Plastino and Silvia Ranfagni

=== Ballet ===
- Caravaggio (2008), a two-act ballet by Mauro Bigonzetti. Moretti wrote the score based on several works by Claudio Monteverdi. Moretti's interpretation was reviewed as "light ... then darker and always varied in texture ... romanticised Monteverdi, but it fits the stage action perfectly."
- Don Giovanni, emozioni di un mito (1996), for Il Balletto di Toscana
- Comoedia (1998), for Aterballetto
- Vespro (2002), for New York City Ballet
- In Vento (2006)
- Oltremare (2008)

=== Orchestral music ===
- Prometeo per orchestra, symphonic poem

== Reviews ==
- Vespro, New York Times, Anna Kisselgoff, 10 May 2002
- Vespro, Village Voice, Deborah Jowitt, 14 May 2002
- In Vento, New York Times, John Rockwell, 6 May 2006
- In Vento, Village Voice, Deborah Jowitt, 9 May 2006
- In Vento, New York Observer, Robert Gottlieb, 4 June 2006
- In Vento, New York Sun, Joel Lobenthal, 8 May 2006
- Oltremare, New York Times, Alastair Macaulay, 25 January 2008
- Oltremare, New York Sun, Joel Lobenthal, 25 January 2008
