= Rococo Variations =

Rococo Variations may refer to:

- Variations on a Rococo Theme by Tchaikovsky
- Rococo Variations (ballet) by Christopher Wheeldon made to the Tchaikovsky Variations on a Rococo Theme
