= An American in Paris (disambiguation) =

An American in Paris is a 1928 symphonic tone poem by George Gershwin. Its music used in the compositions next to it:

- An American in Paris (film), a 1951 MGM musical film starring Gene Kelly
- An American in Paris (ballet), a 2005 ballet by Christopher Wheeldon
- An American in Paris (musical), a 2015 Broadway musical
