= Miriam Mahdaviani =

Miriam Mahdaviani is a choreographer, a former New York City Ballet dancer and a repetiteur for the George Balanchine Trust. She has created ballets for NYCB's 1988 American Music Festival and its Diamond Project in 1992, 1994,1997, 2000 and 2002. She also choreographed ballets for Pacific Northwest Ballet, Richmond Ballet, Jacob's Pillow, Vassar College, NYU Tisch School of the Arts, SUNY Purchase, and others. Internationally, her ballets have been presented at MaggioDanza in Florence, Italy and at the Edinburg Festival in Scotland.

Mahdaviani married Eric Goldstone on October 9, 1988, and has two daughters, Carolyn and Elizabeth.

== Ballets ==
- 1988 The Newcomers
- 1991 Dance Preludes
- 1992 Images
- 1994 Correlazione
- 1997 Urban Dances
- 2000 Appalachia Waltz
- 2002 In the Mi(d)st

== Reviews ==
- June 25, 2002 Anna Kisselgoff, NY Times
- June 29, 1997 Anna Kisselgoff, NY Times
- December 2, 1990 Jennifer Dunning, NY Times
- May 1, 1985 Anna Kisselgoff, NY Times
- November 26, 1983 Jack Anderson, NY Times
- January 31, 1982 Anna Kisselgoff, NY Times

== Articles ==
- Perron, Wendy (June 2000). "Appalachia, Mahdaviani's Diamond Facet - ballet by Miriam Mahdaviani set to 'Appalachia Waltz' for the New York City Ballet Diamond Project". Dance Magazine. 74 (6). Archived from the original on March 9, 2007 – via FindArticles.
- May 15, 1994 Jennifer Dunning, NY Times
- August 16, 1987 Jennifer Dunning, NY Times
