= In the Mi(d)st =

Editing In the Mi(d)st is a ballet made by Miriam Mahdaviani to Oliver Knussen's The Way to Castle Yonder and excerpts from his Music for a Puppet Court and Aaron Jay Kernis' Overture in Feet and Meters. The premiere took place June 21, 2002, as part of New York City Ballet's Diamond Project V at the New York State Theater, Lincoln Center.

== Original cast ==
- Jennie Somogyi
- Alexandra Ansanelli
- James Fayette
- Sébastien Marcovici

== Reviews ==
- Kisselgoff, Anna (June 25, 2002). "Cerebral Style Tinged With Emotion in a Premiere". The New York Times.
- review in the Village Voice by Lynn Garafola, July 2, 2002
- Critical Dance review by Kate Snedeker, June 21, 2002
