= Melissa Barak =

American ballet dancer

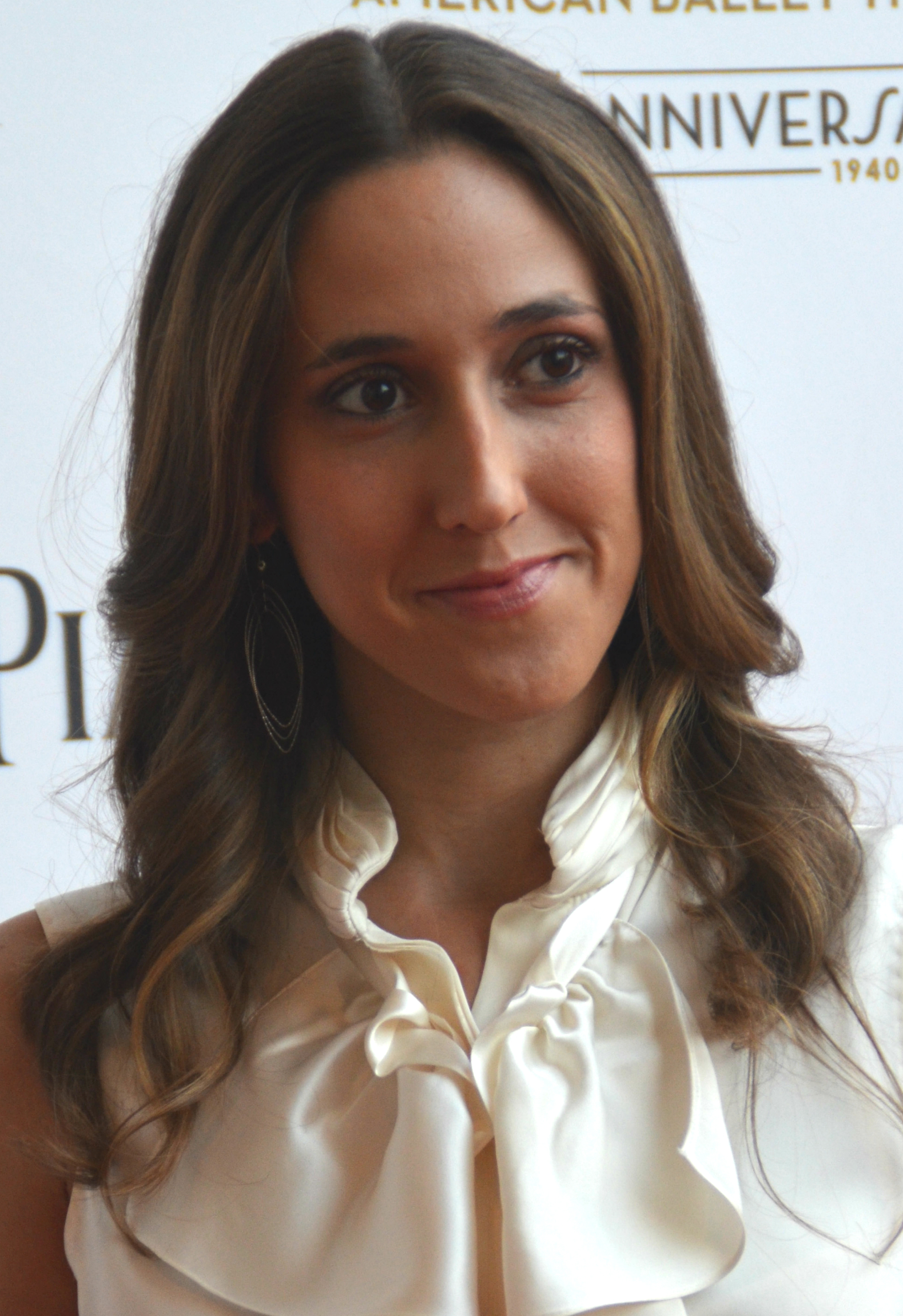
- Barak at the American Ballet Theatre's Annual Stars Under The Stars Benefit in September 2014
- Born: Melissa Gania Barak; August 9, 1979 (age 47); Los Angeles, California, U.S.
- Occupation: Ballet dancer
- Career
- Former groups: Los Angeles Ballet; Morphoses; New York City Ballet

Melissa Barak (born August 9, 1979, in Los Angeles) is a choreographer and ballerina. Since 2006 she has danced with the Los Angeles Ballet and with Morphoses/The Wheeldon Company, formerly having danced for New York City Ballet.

== Dance career ==
Barak began her studies in Santa Monica at Westside School of Ballet with Yvonne Mounsey, Rosemary Valaire, and Nader Hamed. She then moved to New York City in 1996 to attend City Ballet's affiliate, the School of American Ballet, where she originated a role in Christopher Wheeldon's Soiree Musicale in the 1998 Annual Workshop. She danced with City Ballet for nine years.

She was named one of "25 to Watch" in 2002 by Dance Magazine.

=== Featured roles ===
==== George Balanchine ====
- Cortège Hongrois
- The Four Temperaments
- The Nutcracker
- A Midsummer Night's Dream

==== Peter Martins ====
- The Sleeping Beauty
- Swan Lake

==== Christopher Wheeldon ====
- Carnival of the Animals

=== Originated corps roles ===
==== Eliot Feld ====
- Organon

==== Peter Martins ====
- Chichester Psalms

==== Richard Tanner ====
- Soirée

==== Christopher Wheeldon ====
- An American in Paris
- Klavier
- Mercurial Manoeuvres

== Choreographic career ==
Having danced with the New York City Ballet, Barak's work shows influence from George Balanchine. It was at the City Ballet that Barak's work was first noticed by Peter Martins when she was eighteen years old. He commissioned a piece from her for the School of American Ballet in 2001. Barak founded the company Barak Ballet.

=== Choreography ===
==== NYCB ====
- Telemann Overture Suite in E Minor, January 6, 2002.

===== School of American Ballet Annual Workshop =====
- Telemann Overture Suite in E Minor, June 2001

==== Diamond Project ====
- If by Chance, June 4, 2002

=== Honors ===
- Choo-San Goh Award for Choreography, 2001
