= Two Birds =

Two Birds may refer to:

- "Two Birds" (Awake), the 12th episode of the American TV drama Awake
- Two Birds (film), a 2008 Icelandic film
- Two Birds with the Wings of One, 2006 ballet by Jean-Pierre Bonnefoux
- At Swim-Two-Birds, a 1939 novel by Brian O'Nolan
- One Stone and Two Birds, a 2005 Taiwanese film
- Two Birds (album), a 2017 album by Trixie Mattel
- "Two Birds", a song from the 2009 album Far by Regina Spektor.

== See also ==
- Bird & Bird, an international law firm headquartered in London
