= Arch Higgins =

Arch Higgins (born Berkeley, California) was a soloist with New York City Ballet. He began his study at eight years with Berkeley Ballet Theater with former City Ballet dancer Sally Streets. From 1982 he attended summer courses at the School of American Ballet which he entered full-time on scholarship four years later. He was the recipient of the Mae L. Wien Award and joined the NYCB corps de ballet in 1989. Higgins was promoted to soloist in 1998 and danced until 2011. He is now a guest teacher for the company and assistant children's ballet master.

== Roles ==
=== originated featured roles ===
==== David Allan ====
- Pastoral Dances

==== John Alleyne ====
- The New Blondes

==== Robert La Fosse ====
- Duke! (Rockin' in Rhythm)

==== Miriam Mahdaviani ====
- Appalachia Waltz
- Correlazione

==== Peter Martins ====
- Reliquary

==== Trey McIntyre ====
- Rain
- Steel

==== Kevin O'Day ====
- Swerve Poems

==== Jerome Robbins ====
- West Side Story Suite

==== Susan Stroman ====
- Double Feature (Makin' Whoopee!)

==== Christopher Wheeldon ====
- Carnival of the Animals
- Carousel (A Dance)

=== featured roles ===
==== George Balanchine ====
- Agon
- Allegro Brillante
- Le Bourgeois Gentilhomme
- Chaconne
- Divertimento No. 15
- Episodes
- The Four Temperaments
- Haieff Divertimento
- Jewels (Emeralds)
- A Midsummer Night's Dream
- Mozartiana
- The Nutcracker (Balanchine)
- Prodigal Son
- Robert Schumann's Davidsbündlertänze
- Symphony in C
- Symphony in Three Movements
- Tschaikovsky Piano Concerto No. 2
- Union Jack
- La Valse
- Vienna Waltzes

==== Peter Martins ====
- Ash
- Delight of the Muses
- Les Gentilhommes
- Jazz (Six Syncopated Movements)
- Les petits riens
- The Sleeping Beauty
- Slonimsky's Earbox
- Swan Lake
- Symphonic Dances

==== Jerome Robbins ====
- Dances at a Gathering
- Fancy Free
- Fanfare
- Glass Pieces
- The Goldberg Variations
- I'm Old Fashioned
- Interplay
- In the Night
- Ives, Songs
