= Rigmor Mydtskov =

Danish court photographer

Rigmor Mydtskov (1925, Copenhagen – 2010) was a Danish court photographer who is remembered for her portraits of artists performing in Danish theatres but especially for her many portraits of Queen Margrethe and other members of the Danish royal family.

== Early life ==
Born in Copenhagen, she spent her childhood in Helsingør where her father, Hans Julius Mydtskov, was also a photographer. Her Swedish mother, Mary Edit Nerman, had been a nurse in Lund. In 1937, the family moved to Copenhagen where her father, who had taken photographs at the Royal Theatre since 1930, opened a studio in Store Kongensgade. Rigmor became an apprentice with her father, specializing in portraits. She did not like school very much and disappeared into the darkroom. In 1944, he completed her training as a portrait photographer and copyist.

== Professional career ==
In 1954, she began working little by little as a theatre photographer, first substituting for her brother Jørgen, finally taking over his position when he retired in 1972. Her empathy and artistic approach helped her in her theatre work, an area which had always fascinated her. In addition to her assignments at the Royal Theatre, she also worked in many other Copenhagen theatres.

It was in the theatre that she learnt about the human character, photography and decor. Her theatre photographs were often taken during actual performances, revealing additional intensity and action. She worked with great concentration and without interruption. "The photographer's place is in the third row," she would say. Among her best-known theatre photographs are the actors Poul Reument and Bodil Kjer (1955) and the ballet dancer Anna Lærkesen (1963). But she also photographed Bodil Ipsen, Clara Pontoppidan, Mogens Wieth, Ebbe Rode, Ghita Nørby, Jørgen Reenberg, Lise Ringheim, Henrik Moritzen, Erik Mørk and Susse Wold. Last but not least she left us living records of Stig Lommer, Victor Borge and Osvald Helmuth.

For a short period in 1952, she worked as a still photographer for film director Johan Jacobsen at Flamingo Film. In 1962, she married Steen Rønne, a gifted artistic photographer, who helped her further develop her skills.

In 1963, she was contacted by Princess Margrethe who arranged an appointment. It was the beginning of a long relationship which, in 1988, lead to the title of Photographer for Her Majesty the Queen.

Later Rigmor Mydtskov and Rønne moved their studio to Badstuestræde. After her divorce in 1975, it became her own studio.

Taking photographs of the queen was a challenge for Rigmor as she realized every portrait would be historic. Realizing that people in such positions tend to act as if they were masked, she sought to portray the person behind the mask, although she often succeeded in maintaining a little of the secrecy. As a portrait photographer, she was gentle, intuitive and confident. Her life's work is a result of a constant, concentrated effort.

== Exhibitions ==
Rigmor Mydtskov exhibited on countless occasions, both in Denmark and abroad. The first exhibition was in 1955 together with her father and her broth Jørgen. In 1975, she participated at the Danish Museum of Art & Design. In 1985, she had her own exhibition at Magasin du Nord and, in 1989, the 150th anniversary of photography, her participated in the Photographers see themselves exhibition in the Rundetårn.

In 1991, she presented "Portraits of a Queen" at the Auktionshuet Bukowski and in 1997, participated in the travelling exhibition Selskaber (Companies).

== Overall assessment ==
In connection with her being appointed an honorary member of the Dansk Fotografisk Forening in 1995, it was stated that "her attitude shows that she not only earns a living from her profession but lives and breathes photography." Rigmor Mydtskov took the initiative to arrange many photographic exhibitions, often as external examiner or judge. In 1990, she presented Danish photographers in a series on Danish television.

Apart from official photographs taken in her capacity as Royal Photographer, Mydtskov has left definitive portraits of most of Denmark’s 20th century personalities. She untiringly spent hours explaining to her subjects how to present themselves in their most natural yet expressive postures.

== Gallery ==
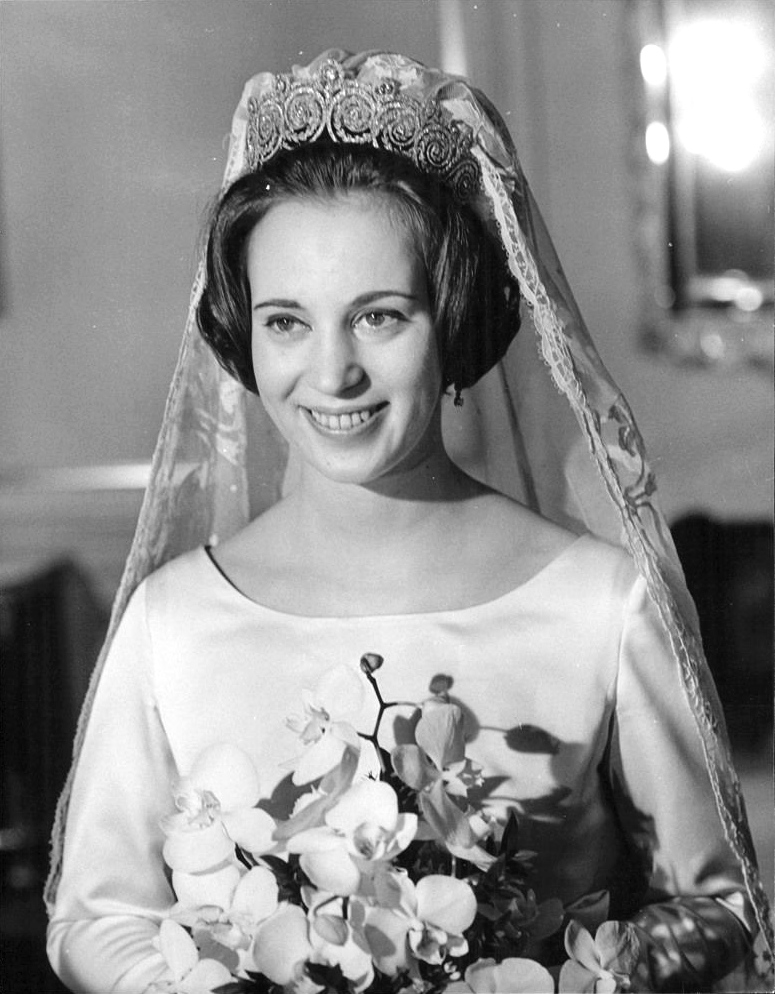
A-wedding-photo-of-Princess-Benedikte-of-Denmark-February-4-1968

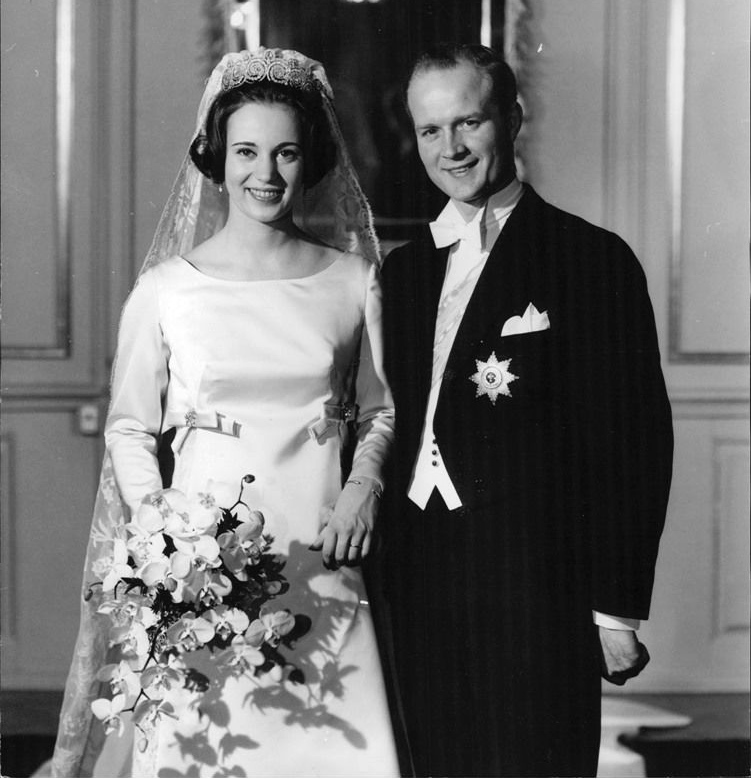
Princess-Benedikte-of-Denmark-and-Prince-Richard-of-Sayn-Wittgenstein-Berleburg

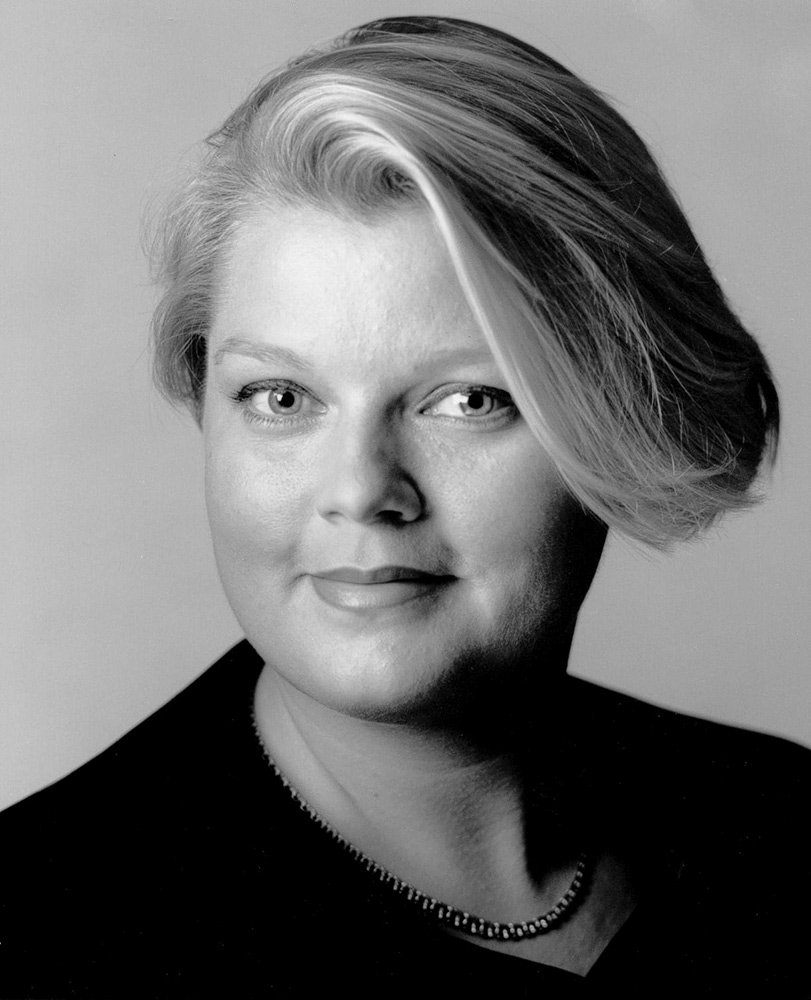
Susanne Resmark

== Awards ==
- Kunsthåndværkerrådets Årspris 1988
- Knight of the Order of the Dannebrog 1990
- Bindesbøll Medaillen 1992
- Honorary Member of Dansk Fotografisk Forening 1995

== Bibliography ==
- Mydtskov, Rigmor, "Portrætter af en dronning", Fiskers forlag, 1991, 61 pp. ISBN 87-89077-65-2
- Mydtskov, Rigmor, Ballettens pragt og eventyr, 1995
- Mydtskov, Rigmor, "Foto: Rigmor Mydtskov: en dokumentation", Copenhagen, Gyldendal, 2003. 301 pp. ISBN 87-00-48164-5.
- Mydtskov, Rigmor; Seidel, Claus; Kistrup, Jens, "Den glade kultur: en billedbog om Amager Scenen gennem 20 år", Fisker & Schou, 1996, 105 pp. ISBN 87-90057-43-0.

== Source ==
- Rigmor Mydtskov's biography at Dansk Kvindebiografisk Leksikon
