= The Newcomers (ballet) =

Ballet

The Newcomers is a ballet made by Miriam Mahdaviani to David Diamond's Rounds for String Orchestra (1944). The premiere took place 7 May 1988, as part of New York City Ballet's American Music Festival at the New York State Theater, Lincoln Center.

== Original cast ==
- Melinda Roy
- Robert La Fosse
- Katrina Killian
- Damian Woetzel
- Roma Sosenko
