= Les Gentilhommes =

Les Gentilhommes is a ballet for nine men choreographed by New York City Ballet's balletmaster-in-chief Peter Martins to Georg Friedrich Händel's 1739 Concerti grossi, Op. 6, Nos. 9 and 2 (Largo). The premiere took place on May 15, 1987, at the New York State Theater, Lincoln Center.

Les Gentilhommes was subtitled "Skol, Stanley!" at its premiere and is dedicated to the late Stanley Williams, co-chairman of faculty at the School of American Ballet, who taught Martins at the Royal Danish Ballet school. The ballet consists of three trios of different moods preceded and followed by sections for the whole ensemble, concluding with a solo. "In Gentilhommes, I didn't just want to make a big bravura piece, showing beats and double air turns, but showing how elegantly and beautifully men can move."

== Casts ==
=== Original ===
- Gen Horiuchi
- Peter Boal
- Carlo Merlo
- Jeffrey Edwards
- Michael Byars
- Damian Woetzel
- Richard Marsden
- Cornel Crabtree
- Runsheng Ying
