= Color Music =

Suite of compositions by Michael Torke

- by Michael Torke
- Key: Movement I: E Movement II: D major Movement III: E major Movement IV: F♯ major Movement V: F minor
- Genre: Neoclassical music Post-minimalism
- Composed: Movement I: June 1984 – February 1985: Movement II: 18 July 1985 – 1 September 1985: Movement III: 1986: Movement IV: 1987: Movement V: October 1988 – December 1988:
- Performed: Movement I: 16 May 1985: New York City; Movement II: 23 November 1985: New York City; Movement III: 20 November 1986: Milwaukee, Wisconsin; Movement IV: 11 June 1987: New York City; Movement V: 3 February 1989: St. Paul, Minnesota
- Movements: 5
- Scoring: Orchestra (Movement V, also chamber orchestra)

Color Music is a suite of five different compositions for orchestra by American composer Michael Torke. The suite is well known for its association with the composer's synesthesia.

== Conception ==
When Michael Torke was studying musical composition in Yale University, he decided to start an early series of compositions "to celebrate without modulation a single color". As Torke himself puts it in the original program note for Ecstasic Orange:

Certain musical ideas make me think of colors. This personal synesthesia contributed its own vibrancy to my attitude towards the material. In the end, different shades of paint splash around the orchestral forces, but it is always some hue of orange.

— Michael Torke, Ecstasic Orange program note

== Structure ==
Even though Torke wrote many more pieces with color titles, the suite consists only of five compositions, written between 1984 and 1988. The order of the movements in this suite has not been established, as the compositions were originally conceived separately, and have not been published together. Therefore, the Color Music label is merely a name to refer to the compositions included in it, and has been used in recordings, but not in its original publishing house, Boosey and Hawkes.

The list of compositions, sorted by year of composition, is as follows:

- Ecstasic Orange (1985)
- Bright Blue Music (1985)
- Green (1986)
- Purple (1987)
- Ash (1988)

=== Ecstatic Orange ===
This composition was originally composed between June 1984 and February 1985 under the commission of ASCAP and Meet the Composer and was premiered on May 16, 1985. The premiere was carried out by the Brooklyn Philharmonic under the baton of Lukas Foss at Copper Union in New York City. It is dedicated to Beth Roberts.

According to musical critic Andrew Porter, the composition is in E. However, according to the composer, the "static material", that is, the tonal center of the composition gravitates towards a six note melody, G#-A-D-C#-B-E, which is never varied or transformed, but rather put in different context. The rhythmic pulse of the composition is based on a constant, insisting line formed by sixteenth notes.

This composition takes approximately 11 minutes to perform, and is score for piccolo, two flutes, two oboes, two clarinets in B-flat, two bassoons, four horns in F, a trumpet in D, two trumpets in B-flat, three trombones, a tuba, a piano, four timpani, a whole set of strings and a large percussion section. Along the piece, color headings appear in the score, entitled "Absinthe", "Apricot, "Terra Cotta", "Unripe Pumpkin", "Copper", etc. These headings refer to the different shades of orange experienced by the composer. As all the movements in this suite, this composition is monothematic.

=== Bright Blue Music ===
This composition was composed between July 18 and September 1, 1985 and was commissioned by the New York Youth Symphony. It was premiered by this same orchestra under David Alan Miller at the Carnegie Hall in New York City, on November 23, 1985. It was published in 1986 by Boosey and Hawkes.

The composer associates the key of this composition, which is D major, to the blue color since he was five years old. Rhythmically, this composition is based on sixteenth notes, as his previous compositions Ecstasic Orange and Vanada. Since this is a monothematic composition, the melody never modulates.

The composition takes approximately 9 minutes to perform, and is scored for three flutes, two oboes, two clarinets in B-flat, two bassoons, four horns in F, three trumpets in C, three trombones, a tuba, timpani, a piano, a harp, a string section and a large percussion section, which takes four percussionists.

=== Green ===
Initially entitled Verdant Music, Green was commissioned by the Robert E. Gard Wisconsin Idea Foundation and was first performed by the Milwaukee Symphony Orchestra, under the baton of Lukas Foss, on November 20, 1986, in the Uihlein Hall, in Milwaukee, Wisconsin.

In this disposition, Torke associates E major, which is the invariable key of this composition, to the green color. The melody is a simple consecution of the notes F#-A-D#-E-B. This melody is maintained without changed, in different context, but always conveying the same idea. The tempo is much faster than in the previous movements. As opposed to Bright Blue Music, Purple and Ash, this composition has an annotation halfway through the score, which indicates a "fresh green", another association of Torke.

The composition takes around 12 minutes to perform and is scored for three flutes, two oboes, and English horn, two clarinets, a bass clarinet in B-flat, two bassoons, four horns, three trumpets, three trombones, a tuba, timpani, a string section and a percussion section, which takes three percussionists. This composition is monothematic.

=== Purple ===
Specifically composed to be included in the ballet Ecstatic Orange, which included the Green and Ecstasic Orange colors as well, Purple was premiered by the New York City Ballet Orchestra under the baton of Lukas Foss at the New York State Theatre in the Lincoln Center on June 11, 1987. It is the shortest composition in the set, lasting around six minutes. Scored for three flutes, two oboes, an English horn, two clarinets in A, one bass clarinet in B-flat, two bassoons, four horns, three trumpets, three trombones, a tuba, timpani, a harp, a piano, a string section and a percussion section taking three percussionists, Purple is monothematic and highlights the brass, which give importance to the syncopating character of the piece.

=== Ash ===
This composition was commissioned by the St. Paul Chamber Orchestra with the support from the Jerome Foundation. It was composed between October and December 1988, and was premiered at the World Theater in St. Paul, Minnesota, by the St. Paul Chamber Orchestra, under John Adams, on February 3, 1989. Given that the commissioner was a chamber orchestra, this is the only piece in the set that does not require a large orchestra.

The composition is in F minor, and is the only composition in the set which modulates to another key. In this case, given its overt neoclassical nature, it modulates to A-flat major in some instances, only to return to F minor shortly after. In this case, color is not a preoccupation of Torke and it does not have an important role, as it did in the other movements.

This is the longest composition in the set, taking approximately 15 minutes to perform. It is scored for an orchestra which consists of a flute, two oboes, a clarinet in B-flat, two bassoons, three horns in F, a trumpet in B-flat, timpani, a set of strings and a synthesizer. Torke clarifies that the synthesizer's timbre is flexible, although a bass sound with a percussive edge, buzz and reinforced pitch is recommended.

== Reception ==
The different compositions have been well received by critics. The use of a post-minimalist style has been praised in virtually all the compositions.

== See also ==
- Ecstatic Orange, 1987 ballet by Peter Martins
- Ash, 1991 ballet by Peter Martins
