= Hallelujah Junction (ballet) =

Hallelujah Junction is the eighth ballet made by New York City Ballet ballet master in chief Peter Martins to John Adams' eponymous music. The duo pianists appear in silhouette above the dancers throughout in Mark Stanley's lighting. The dance was made on the Royal Danish Ballet. The premiere took place on 24 March 2001 at the Royal Danish Theatre, Copenhagen. The NYCB premiere was on 22 January 2002 at the New York State Theater, Lincoln Center.

== Original cast ==
- Gitte Lindstrom

and four women in black

- Andrew Bowman
- Andrey Batalov

and four men in white

== Reviews ==
- NY Times by Anna Kisselgoff, January 24, 2002
- NY Times by Anna Kisselgoff, May 17, 2003
