= Simple Symphony (ballet) =

Ballet made by Melissa Barak

A Simple Symphony is a ballet made by former company dancer Melissa Barak for New York City Ballet to Benjamin Britten's eponymous music from 1934 for string orchestra. The premiere took place on Tuesday, 17 February 2009 at the David H. Koch Theater, Lincoln Center. The choreographer designed the women’s costumes. She is quoted as saying that she took inspiration from Balanchine’s La source and Raymonda Variations.

== Original cast ==
- Sara Mearns
- Ana Sophia Scheller
- Tiler Peck
- Jared Angle
- Tyler Angle
- Sean Suozzi
- Anna Pavlova
