= Joseph W. Polisi =

American Academic

Joseph Polisi
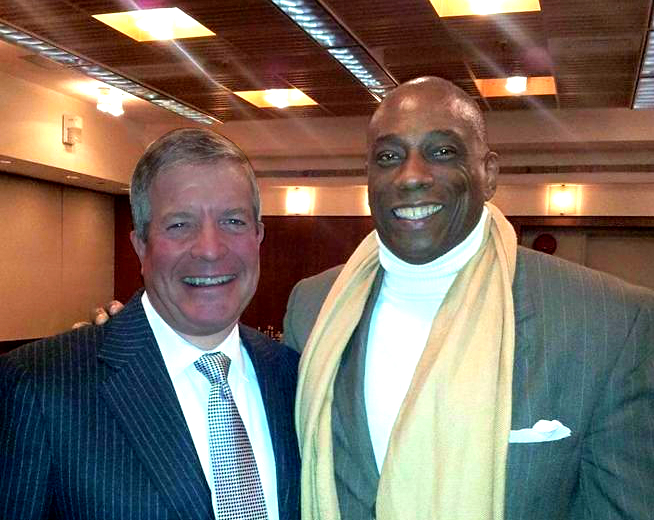
- Polisi (left) with Juilliard alumnus Stacey Robinson, 2008

6th President of the Juilliard School
- In office September 1984 – July 2018
- Preceded by: Peter Mennin
- Succeeded by: Damian Woetzel

Personal details
- Born: Joseph William Polisi; May 17, 1947 (age 79) New York City, New York, U.S.
- Education: University of Connecticut (BA); Tufts University (MA); Conservatoire de Paris; Yale University (DMA)

Joseph William Polisi (born 1947) is the former President of The Juilliard School from 1984 to May 2017, having assumed the position upon the death of his predecessor, Peter Mennin. He was succeeded by Damian Woetzel.

Born in New York City to an Italian family, Dr. Polisi is the son of William Polisi, a bassoonist who performed with the New York Philharmonic. He oversaw the construction of Juilliard's first dormitory— the Meredith Willson Residence Hall, and focused his tenure on "community building". Polisi is the author of The Artist as Citizen, a book which implores the classical music world to reach out to society at large.

== Education ==
Joseph Polisi earned a B.A. in political science from the University of Connecticut, an M.A. in international relations from The Fletcher School of Law and Diplomacy at Tufts University, and a D.M.A. from Yale University in 1980. Polisi studied the bassoon with his late father, and performed through his undergraduate years. He also studied with Maurice Allard at the Conservatoire de Paris, France, from 1973 to 1974.

== Professional career ==
Polisi was the Executive Officer of the Yale School of Music (1976–1980), then served in the capacity as Dean of the Music Department at the Manhattan School of Music (1983–1984), and the University of Cincinnati College-Conservatory of Music from 1983-1984.

Polisi has performed with the Juilliard Orchestra.

== Works ==
- Polisi, Joseph (2005). The Artist as Citizen. Milwaukee, WI: Amadeus. p. 200. ISBN 1-57467-103-0.
- Polisi, Joseph (2008). American Muse: The Life and Times of William Schuman. Milwaukee, WI: Amadeus. p. 616. ISBN 978-1-57467-173-5.
