= Grazioso (ballet) =

Ballet by Peter Martins

Grazioso is a ballet made on New York City Ballet by Peter Martins, its balletmaster-in-chief, to music by Mikhail Glinka. The premiere took place at City Ballet's fall gala on Tuesday, November 20, 2007 at the New York State Theater, Lincoln Center.

== Music ==
- A Life for the Tsar, Act II
  - Mazurka
  - Pas de Quatre
  - Cracovienne
- Ruslan and Ludmila, Act III
  - Pas de Trois

== Original cast ==
- Ashley Bouder
- Gonzalo Garcia
- Daniel Ulbricht
- Andrew Veyette

== Reviews ==
- New York Times by Jennifer Dunning, November 22, 2007
