= Jason Fowler (dancer) =

Jason Fowler studied ballet at the Dallas Ballet Center and entered the School of American Ballet in 1993. While there he danced selections from Balanchine's Agon, Cortège Hongrois, The Nutcracker and A Midsummer Night's Dream. Fowler became an apprentice with New York City Ballet in 1995, joined the corps de ballet in 1996 and was promoted to soloist in 2006.

== Originated rôles ==
=== Mauro Bigonzetti ===
- Vespro
- In Vento

=== Susan Stroman ===
- Double Feature, The Blue Necklace, Mr. Griffith

=== Christopher Wheeldon ===
- Polyphonia

== Featured roles ==
=== George Balanchine ===
- Agon
- Chaconne
- Divertimento No. 15
- The Nutcracker
  - Hot Chocolate
  - Host
- A Midsummer Night's Dream
  - Titania's Cavalier
  - Demetrius
  - Theseus
- Scotch Symphony
- Slaughter on Tenth Avenue
- Union Jack
- La Valse
- Vienna Waltzes

=== Boris Eifman ===
- Musagète

=== Peter Martins ===
- The Sleeping Beauty European tour
- Swan Lake
  - Hungarian
  - Russian
  - Spanish

=== Jerome Robbins ===
- The Four Seasons
  - Janus
- Glass Pieces
- The Goldberg Variations

=== Christopher Wheeldon ===
- After The Rain

== Reviews ==
- NY Times, Jennifer Dunning June 18, 2002
- NY Times, Jennifer Dunning January 28, 2008
