= Hallelujah Junction =

Composition for two pianos by John Adams

Hallelujah Junction is a composition for two pianos written in 1996 by the American composer John Adams. Adams titled his autobiography after this composition. A two-CD retrospective album of works by Adams on the Nonesuch label is also entitled Hallelujah Junction, but does not include the composition.

== Composition ==
The name comes from a small truck stop on US 395 which meets Alternate US 40, (now State Route 70) near the California–Nevada border. Adams said of the piece, "Here we have a case of a great title looking for a piece. So now the piece finally exists: the 'junction' being the interlocking style of two-piano writing which features short, highly rhythmicized motives bouncing back and forth between the two pianos in tightly phased sequences".

The work centers around delayed repetition between the two pianos, creating an effect of echoing sonorities. There is a constant shift of pulse and meter, but the main rhythms are based on the rhythms of the word "Hal–le–LU–jah".

The work is in three unnamed movements, and generally takes about 16 minutes to perform. It was first performed by Grant Gershon and Gloria Cheng at the Getty Center in Brentwood, California, in 1998. It is dedicated to Ernest Fleischmann, long-time general manager of the Los Angeles Philharmonic.

In 2002 the composition was used for a ballet with choreography by Peter Martins.

== Recordings ==
- 2003: Stravinsky: Concerto for 2 pianos; Adams: Hallelujah Junction; Boulez: Structures, Book 2 with Gerard Bouwhuis and Cees van Zeeland, Turtle Records
- 2005: John Adams: Road Movies with Nicolas Hodges and Rolf Hind, Nonesuch Records
- 2005: John Adams: Road Movies; Hallelujah Junction; Phrygian Gates; China Gates with Andrew Russo and James Ehnes, Black Box Classics
- 2007: John Adams: Complete Piano Music with Ralph van Raat and Maarten van Veen, Naxos Records
- 2007: Junctions with Roberto Hidalgo and Marc Peloquin, Urtext Records (Mexico)
- 2016: Visions with Christina Naughton and Michelle Naughton, Warner Classics 2564601136
- 2017: Adams: Piano Music with Jeroen van Veen and Sandra van Veen, Brilliant Classics 95388
- 2025: Hallelujah Junction: Adams, Stravinsky, Gershwin & Copland with Lukas Geniušas and Anna Geniushene, Alpha Classics

== In popular culture ==
The 2017 film Call Me by Your Name opens with an excerpt of the first movement.

An excerpt of the first movement was used in the pilot episode of FX's drama Pose.
