= Tributary (ballet) =

Tributary is a ballet made by Robert La Fosse and Robert Garland to Mozart's Divertimento No. 11 in D, K. 251 (1776). The premiere took place on May 25, 2000, as part of New York City Ballet's Diamond Project at the New York State Theater, Lincoln Center.

== Original cast ==
- Kyra Nichols
- Donald Williams (Note: Donald Williams appeared as guest artist from the Dance Theatre of Harlem)

== Notes and references ==
Notes
