= Chichester Psalms (ballet) =

Ballet by Peter Martins

Chichester Psalms is a ballet made by New York City Ballet ballet master in chief Peter Martins to eponymous music by Leonard Bernstein. The premiere took place 2 June 2004 at the New York State Theater, with performance by the Juilliard Choral Union, costumes designed by Catherine Barinas, and lighting by Mark Stanley.

== Original cast ==
- Carla Körbes
- Amar Ramasar

== Reviews ==
- NY Times by Anna Kisselgoff, June 4, 2004
- NY Times by Jenifer Dunning, April 29, 2005
- NY Times by Alastair Macaulay, November 26, 2008
