= Rosemary Valaire =

American ballet teacher

Rosemary Valaire (June 11, 1930 – May 7, 1999) was a ballet teacher and co-director of the Westside Ballet of Santa Monica, California, with Yvonne Mounsey and a dancer with the Royal Ballet of England from 1946 to 1949. Rosemary died at her home in Los Angeles on May 7, 1999, at the age of 68 of a brain tumor. Rosemary was co-director of Westside Ballet from 1967 until her death in 1999.
