= Luciana Savignano =

Italian ballet dancer (born 1943)

- Born: November 30, 1943; Milan
- Known for: Ballet

Luciana Savignano (born 30 November 1943) is an Italian ballet dancer.

== Life and career ==
Luciana Savignano was born in Milan and trained at the Ballet School of La Scala and at the Bolshoi Theatre in Moscow. In 1968 she was chosen by Mario Pistoni as soloist for Mandarino Meraviglioso with music by Béla Bartók, which brought her to the notice of the dance world. In 1972 she became prima ballerina at La Scala, and later Maurice Béjart created roles for her in Leda and the Swan, Ce que l'amour me dit and La Voce, based on La Voix Humaine by Jean Cocteau. She has also interpreted Romeo and Juliet, Buak, Bolero, Swan Lake, The Taming of the Shrew, Cinderella, A la memoire (Mahler), Carmina Burana (Carl Orff) and Orpheus (Stravinsky). She gained critical acclaim in Europe and performed internationally, guesting with the Maurice Béjart's Ballet of the 20th Century in New York in 1977.

In 1995 Savignano began a collaboration with the choreographer Susanna Beltrami, with whom she founded The Lombard Dance Company in 1998. Since 2009 she has served as one of the judges of the talent show of Rai 2 Italian Academy.

== Filmography ==
- Aida (2006)
- Mosè e Faraone, o Il passaggio del Mar Rosso (2003)
- Rudolf Nureyev alla Scala (video documentary) (2005)
- La plaça de la lluna (TV series) (1988)
