= Carousel (ballet) =

Carousel (A Dance)
- Choreographer: Christopher Wheeldon
- Music: Richard Rodgers, arranged by William David Brohn
- Premiere: November 26, 2002; New York State Theater
- Original ballet company: New York City Ballet
- Design: Holly Hynes
- Genre: Contemporary ballet

Carousel (A Dance) is a ballet made by New York City Ballet resident choreographer Christopher Wheeldon to the music of Carousel Waltz and If I Loved You (1945) by Richard Rodgers, arranged and orchestrated by William David Brohn. The music used in the ballet is from Rodgers and Hammerstein's classic 1945 musical Carousel. The premiere took place Tuesday, 26 November 2002, at the New York State Theater, Lincoln Center.

== Production ==
Carousel (A Dance) was commissioned as part of New York City Ballet's gala celebrating Richard Rodgers's centennial, and was not intended to be revived afterwards, though the positive reviews led to its revivals. The ballet is set to music from the 1945 musical Carousel, but it is pure dance rather than a narrative ballet. The ballet shows a love pas de deux between the lead couple, highlighted from the corps de ballet. The ballet was added to Pacific Northwest Ballet's repertoire in 2009.

== Original cast ==
- Alexandra Ansanelli
- Damian Woetzel

== Videography ==
In light of the impact of the COVID-19 coronavirus pandemic on the performing arts, New York City Ballet released recording of the ballet, featuring Lauren Lovette and Tyler Angle.
