= Oltremare =

Ballet by Mauro Bigonzetti

Oltremare is a ballet by Mauro Bigonzetti to Bruno Moretti's eponymous music commissioned by New York City Ballet. The premiere took place Wednesday, January 23, 2008, at the New York State Theater, Lincoln Center, with costumes by the choreographer and Marc Happel and lighting by Mark Stanley. Oltremare is the third of three Bigonzetti / Moretti ballets commissioned by City Ballet, the others being Vespro and In Vento.

== Original cast ==
- Maria Kowroski
- Tiler Peck
- Tyler Angle
- Amar Ramasar

== Reviews ==
- NY Times review by Alastair Macaulay, January 25, 2008
- NY Post review by Clive Barnes, January 25, 2008
- NY Sun review by Joel Lobenthal, January 25, 2008
