= Two Birds with the Wings of One =

Two Birds with the Wings of One is a ballet made by Jean-Pierre Bonnefoux for New York City Ballet's Diamond Project to two poems from the Sung Dynasty and "Chi Lin's Dance" from Flute Moon by Bright Sheng. The premiere took place on May 25, 2006, at New York State Theater, Lincoln Center.

== Original cast ==
- Sofiane Sylve
- Andrew Veyette

== Reviews ==
- NY Times review by John Rockwell, May 27, 2006
- NY Times article by John Rockwell, June 20, 2006
