= Lucio Del Pezzo =

Italian artist, painter and sculptor (1933–2020)

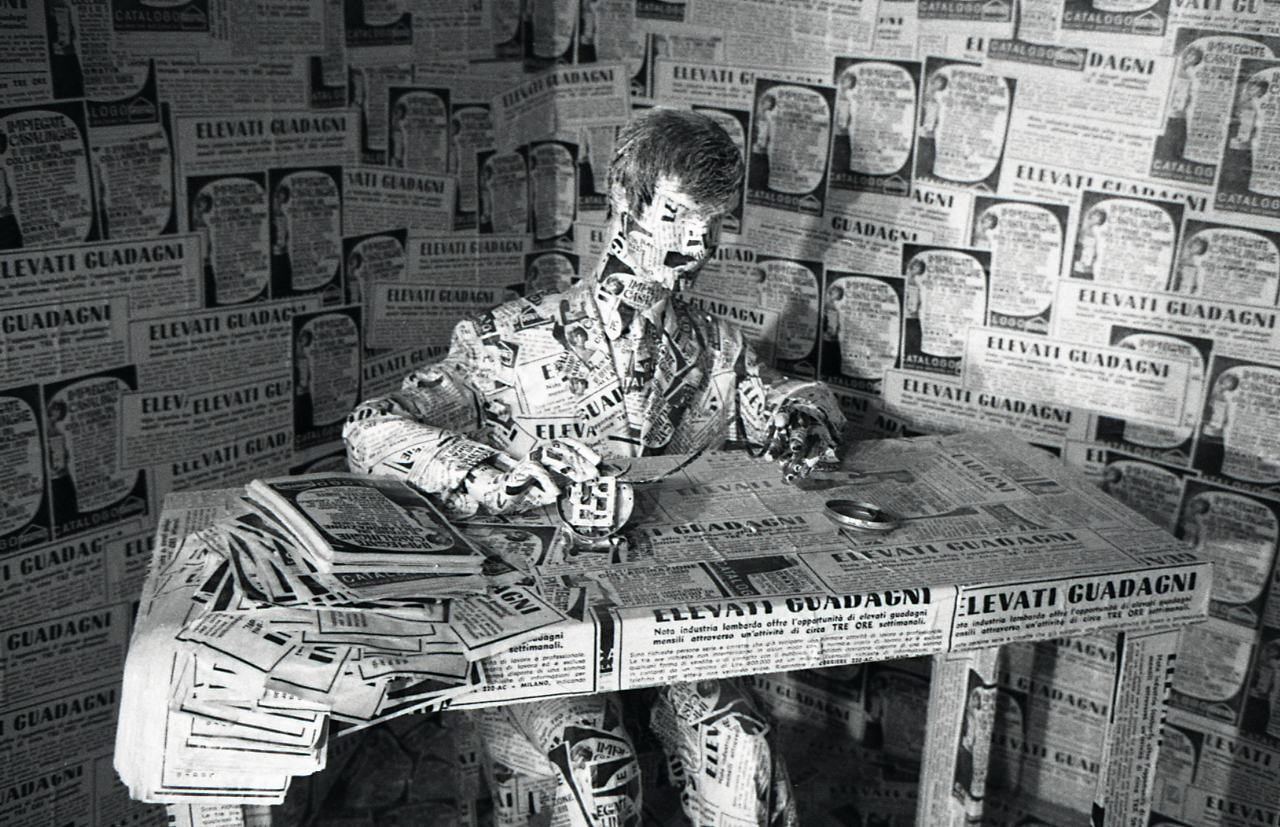
- Born: December 13, 1933; Naples, Italy
- Died: April 12, 2020 (aged 86); Milan, Italy
- Known for: Painter, jewelry designer, graphic artist, sculptor

Lucio Del Pezzo (13 December 1933 - 12 April 2020) was an Italian artist, painter and sculptor.

== Biography ==
Del Pezzo was born on December 13, 1933, in Naples. In 1960, he moved to Paris, then to Milan, where he held several solo exhibitions. In 1964, he held an exhibition, Labirinto del tempo libero, at the Triennale di Milano and the Venice Biennale. In 1967, he participated in an exhibition in the Kruger Gallery in Geneva, where he exhibited together with Giorgio de Chirico, and other Italian artist. In 1988, he participated in a group exhibited at the Palace of Arts in Moscow, together with other Italian artists. In 2001 he designed some ceramic reliefs and a bronze for two stations on the new Naples underground.

Lucio Del Pezzo died in Milan on April 12, 2020.
