= Anna Lærkesen =

- Born: 2 March 1942; Copenhagen, Denmark
- Died: 14 January 2016 (aged 73); Copenhagen
- Occupation: Ballet Dancer

Anna Lærkesen (2 March 1942 – 14 January 2016) was a Danish ballet dancer who was a soloist at the Royal Danish Ballet. She had her debut at the theatre in the Bournonville version of La Sylphide as the first sylph (1959). She was appointed soloist in 1964 and was promoted to 1st female soloist two years later, a title that had until then only been bestowed upon Margot Lander. After long periods of illness, she was dismissed from service shortly before her 25th anniversary where she would have appeared in a production of Livjægerne på Amager in which she would have portrayed the character of Louise.

== Dance career ==
Born on 2 March 1942 in Copenhagen, Denmark, Anna Lærkesen, who came from an officer family in Søborg, wished to dance from an early age. While most of her early life consisted of classical ballet training and educational studies at Danish schools, Lærkesen was ready to further her career upon growing older with little success in the past. At age 17 in 1959, she became a cadet of the prestigious Royal Danish Ballet in her hometown of Copenhagen, breaking the previous rule of all members only to be added from the company's own ballet school. With them, she was able to dance in many ballets alongside other advanced performers. Her Bournonville style of training from the company allowed her to dance beautifully in front of almost 2,000 people at the historic Royal Danish Theatre in Kongens Nytorv for many seasons. Even though she loved it, performing took a lot of hard work and dedication, but it was seven years later that her time paid off. At age 24, Lærkesen had been named a soloist of the Royal Danish Ballet, a prominent position within any ballet company. This promotion opened many doors for her as a dancer, allowing her to star in more leading roles. Her most well-known role to date though remains in her spot as the principal dancer of the August Bournonville revival of Tanglioni's La Sylphide. After her performance, Lærkesen starred as many more acclaimed characters for the next several years until a lifetime of brutal training began to take a toll on her body. It was at 42, in 1984, that she was forced to retire from ballet at an age considered far too old among ballerinas today. Her career was inspiring, and amongst those almost 25 years, she had starred in many well-known ballets.

== Roles ==
As a ballerina, Anna Lærkesen found herself portraying a different character in many fascinating storylines. From her beginnings with the Royal Danish Ballet, her first starring role, and most-well known to date, remains as her portrayal as the first sylph in Bournonville's La Sylphide. Her successful placement as the lead allowed her to dance the same role for almost seven years. Among those years though, she took part in a work by Swedish choreographer Birgit Cullberg entitled Månerenen and Flemming Flindt's version of The Nutcracker. 1961 found her in English choreographer, K. MacMillan's Solitaire when shows were set to be put on in Copenhagen. Her next role required training at the Bolshoi Theatre in Moscow in 1964 to prepare for the technically advanced roles as both Odette and Odile in Swan Lake. In 1968, she also took part in the ballet Giselle and many others before the final years of her career with the theatre. With her impending resignation, Lærkesen was set to star in one more role as Louise in King's Volunteers on Amager, but was not given the chance before her retirement in 1984. With an honorary career behind her, Anna Lærkesen was not ready to give up ballet yet though.

== Choreography career ==
After almost twenty five years with the Royal Danish Ballet, Lærkesen had to decide what would come next in her life, as she was only forty two years old. At the time, she had still been working with her former company and decided to participate in a dancers' workshop a few years later. It was in those classes in 1988 that Lærkesen created her first piece of choreography for the company. Since then, she took on choreographing full-time, developing several more ballets for the Danish. In 1990, she produced a ballet entitled Patita that did well enough to air on a local television station in her home country of Denmark. More choreographing led her to her debut with the New York City Ballet in 1994, where she developed a piece for the second addition of the showcase entitled the Diamond Project. Her dance, "In the Blue" exhibited a combination Brahms's Violin Concerto and principal dancers including Wendy Whelan and fellow previous Royal Danish Ballet dancer Lærkesen's choreography featured a wide expansion of movement across the entirety of the stage and no perceivable rule in which she followed. Most of her choreographed pieces ended up similar to the aforementioned, and she continued creating ballets with her own company and others, including the San Francisco Ballet and the Opera of Stockholm.
