= Rococo Variations (ballet) =

Ballet

Rococo Variations is the last ballet made by Christopher Wheeldon during his tenure as New York City Ballet's first resident choreographer; it was made to Tschaikovsky's Variations on a Rococo Theme for violoncello and orchestra in A major Op. 33 (1876–77). The premiere took place on Thursday, 7 February 2008 at the New York State Theater, Lincoln Center, with costumes by Holly Hynes.

== Original cast ==
- Sterling Hyltin
- Sara Mearns
- Giovanni Villalobos
- Adrian Danchig-Waring

== Reviews ==
- NY Times by Alastair Macaulay, 9 February 2008
- Village Voice by Deborah Jowitt, 5 February 2008
