= List of Aterballetto productions =

This is a list of Aterballetto productions. Aterballetto is an Italian modern dance company founded in 1977 by ATER (Associazione Teatri Emilia Romagna) as "Compagnia di Balletto dei Teatri dell'Emilia Romagna". Its first artistic director was Vittorio Biagi. It is based in the north eastern Italian city of Reggio Emilia. It acquired its present name in 1979. That same year Amedeo Amodio became the company artistic director.

Aterballetto is the principal producing and touring dance company in Italy and also the first permanent ballet-producing organisation independent of an opera house in Italy. The company enjoys worldwide recognition for its productions performed in theatres and festivals throughout Europe, North America, South America, Africa and Asia. Since 1997, the company's artistic director and choreographer is Mauro Bigonzetti.

The company's style is marked by the ability to shift across a wide range of musical styles, from classical to pop and jazz.

== Productions ==
Original creations & World premieres	Creative team
Consecutio Temporum (1980)	Choreography: Amedeo Amodio Music: Benjamin Britten; Costume and set design: M. A. Gambaro
Cinque Minuti Prima (1980)	Choreography: Amedeo Amodio Music: Emmanuel Chabrier; Costume and set design: L. Benedetti
Sfere di Mercurio (1980)	Choreography: Margo Sappington Music: Michael Kamen; Costume and set design: C. Holder
Capricci (1981)	Choreography: Amedeo Amodio Music: Niccolò Paganini - Franz Liszt; Costume and set design: M. A. Gambaro
La Favorita (1982)	Choreography: Amedeo Amodio Music: Gaetano Donizetti
Histoire du Soldat (1982)	Choreography: Amedeo Amodio Music: Igor Stravinsky; Costume and set design: Emanuele Luzzati
Le renard (1982)	Choreography: Amedeo Amodio Music: Igor Stravinsky; Costume and set design: Emanuele Luzzati
Verdi Variations (1982)	Choreography: K. McMillan Music: Giuseppe Verdi; Costume and set design: D. McMillan
Le nozze d'Aurora (1982)	Choreography: Amedeo Amodio Music: Pyotr Ilyich Tchaikovsky; Costume and set design: Amedeo Amodio
Là ci darem la mano (1983)	Choreography: Amedeo Amodio Music: Musicisti vari Costume and set design: P. Grossi
Escapades (1983)	Choreography: A. Ailey Music: M. Roach; Costume and set design: C. V. Garner
Psiche a Manhattan (1984)	Choreography: Amedeo Amodio Music: Leonard Bernstein; Costume and set design: P. Grossi
Notturni (1984)	Choreography: Amedeo Amodio Music: Manuel de Falla; Costume and set design: Amedeo Amodio
Pulcinella* (1985)	Choreography: Amedeo Amodio Music: Igor Stravinsky; Costume and set design: Emanuele Luzzati
The Dream Walk of the Shaman * (1985)	Choreography: Glen Tetley Music: Ernst Krenek; Costume and set design: J. McFarlane
Coccodrilli in abito da sera* (1985)	Choreography: Amedeo Amodio Music: Musicisti vari Costume and set design: R. Corradini
Naturale* (1985)	Choreography: Amedeo Amodio Music: Luciano Berio; Costume and set design: L. Spinatelli
Mazapegul* (1986)	Choreography: Amedeo Amodio Music: Azio Corghi; Costume and set design: L. Spinatelli
Non sparate sull'obiettivo (1986)	Choreography: Amedeo Amodio Music: G. Calì; Costume and set design: L. Scarabotti
Romeo e Giulietta* (1987)	Choreography: Amedeo Amodio Music: Hector Berlioz; Costume and set design: M. Ceroli - L. Spinatelli
Ai limiti della notte* (1988)	Choreography: Amedeo Amodio Music: Musicisti vari Costume and set design: P. Dor - M. Millenotti
A sud di Mozart* (1987)	Choreography: Amedeo Amodio Music: Eugenio Bennato - Carlo D'Angiò; Costume and set design: Emanuele Luzzati - L. Spinatelli
Octet* (1988)	Choreography: L. Childs Music: Steve Reich; Costume and set design: H. Binkley
Il Maestro di Cappella* (1988)	Choreography: Amedeo Amodio Music: Domenico Cimarosa; Costume and set design: Amedeo Amodio
Lo Schiaccianoci* (1989)	Choreography: Amedeo Amodio Music: Pyotr Ilyich Tchaikovsky; Costume and set design: Emanuele Luzzati
Volo di un uccello predatore* (1989)	Choreography: J. Muller Music: Naná Vasconcelos - Jan Garbarek; Costume and set design: W. Katz
Le pietre che cantano* (1989)	Choreography: Amedeo Amodio Music: Jan Garbarek - Perotinus; Costume and set design: Amedeo Amodio
Il cappello a tre punte* (1990)	Choreography: Amedeo Amodio Music: Manuel de Falla; Costume and set design: E. Luzzati
Sei in movimento* (1990)	Choreography: Mauro Bigonzetti Music: Johann Sebastian Bach; Costume and set design: S. Califano
Cartoline per Mozart* (1991)	Choreography: Amedeo Amodio Music: Various artists
Prova con Mozart* (1991)	Choreography: Mauro Bigonzetti Music: Wolfgang Amadeus Mozart; Costume and set design: S. Califano
Coppélia* (1992)	Choreography: Amedeo Amodio Music: Various artists Costume and set design: L. Spinatelli
Pitture per archi* (1992)	Choreography: Mauro Bigonzetti Music: Ludwig van Beethoven; Costume and set design: C. Parmiggiani
Sogno di una notte di mezza estate* (1993)	Choreography: Amedeo Amodio Music: Felix Mendelssohn; Costume and set design: Del Pezzo
Hor che 'l ciel* (1993)	Choreography: M. Morione Music: Claudio Monteverdi; Costume and set design: T. Trevisiol
Improvvisazioni di un fauno* (1993)	Choreography: Amedeo Amodio Music: Various artists
"Paolo e Francesca" (1994)	Choreography: Amedeo Amodio Music: Maurice Ravel
Le Sirene* (1994)	Choreography: Amedeo Amodio Music: Lester Bowie
Basket Variations* (1994)	Choreography: Amedeo Amodio Music: G. Calì
Carmen* (1995)	Choreography: Amedeo Amodio Music: Georges Bizet; Costume and set design: L. Spinatelli
Dialetti* (1995)	Choreography: Amedeo Amodio Music: G. Calì
Lo strano caso del Dottor Jekyll e del Signor Hyde* (1996)	Choreography: Amedeo Amodio Music: Maurice Ravel, Christoph Willibald Gluck, Antonio Vivaldi, G. Calì; Costume and set design: C. Tissier - Amedeo Amodio
Divertimento per orchestra* (1997)	Choreography: M. van Hoecke Music: Leonard Bernstein
Circus* (1997)	Choreography: O. Caiti Music: Various artists Costume and set design: L. Khamzina
Songs* (1997)	Choreography: Mauro Bigonzetti Music: Henry Purcell; Costume and set design: P. Calafiore
Nove ritratti* (1997)	Choreography: O. Caiti Music: P. Castaldi; Costume and set design: R. Ferrarini
Pèrsephassa* (1997)	Choreography: Mauro Bigonzetti Music: Iannis Xenakis; Costume and set design: C. Cerri
Canzoni* (1997)	Choreography: Mauro Bigonzetti Music: Various artists
Comoedia* (1998)	Choreography: Mauro Bigonzetti Music: Bruno Moretti; Costume and set design: C. Parmigiani, C. Cerri L. Socci
Phantasmagoria* (1998)	Choreography: P. De Ruiter Music: Various artists Costume and set design: H. Palmers
Ricreazione* (1998)	Choreography: O. Caiti Music: Joseph Haydn
Furia Corporis* (1998)	Choreography: Mauro Bigonzetti Music: Ludwig van Beethoven; Costume and set design: C. Cerri - S. Califano
Constructions* (1998)	Choreography: Mauro Bigonzetti Music: John Cage; Costume and set design: L. Socci
Trittico per Leopardi* (1998)	Choreography: O. Caiti - L. Petrillo - M. Zullo Music: T. Popoli - G. Calì E. Natoli
Comoedia - canto secondo* (1999)	Choreography: Mauro Bigonzetti Music: Arvo Pärt - Dmitri Shostakovich - Edward Elgar - F. Germini; Costume and set design: C. Parmiggiani, C. Cerri
Colla Parte* (1999)	Choreography: N. Verdoorn Music: P. Wachsmann / P. Lytton, Ernst Reijseger; Costume and set design: Niko van der Klugt
Morphing Games* (1999)	Choreography: J. Spuck Music: Franz Schubert; Costume and set design: C. Cerri
Come qualcosa palpita nel fondo* (1999)	Choreography: Mauro Bigonzetti Music: A. Gentilucci; Costume and set design: C. Cerri
Comoedia - canto terzo* (2000)	Choreography: Mauro Bigonzetti Music: Pēteris Vasks, Johann Sebastian Bach; Costume and set design: C. Parmiggiani - C. Cerri
Lontanemete* (2000)	Choreography: O. Caiti Music: T. Popoli; Costume and set design: L. Costi - R. Ferrarini
Closed hands* (2000)	Choreography: Mauro Bigonzetti Music: Nils Petter Molvær; Costume and set design: L. Costi
Figli d'Adamo* (2000)	Choreography: M. Abbondanza / A. Bertoni Music: edited by M. Casappa; Costume and set design: L. Socci
Comoedia Canti* (2000)	Choreography: Mauro Bigonzetti Music: Various artists Costume and set design: C. Parmiggiani
Sogno di una notte di mezza estate* (2000)	Choreography: Mauro Bigonzetti Music: Elvis Costello; Costume and set design: F. Plessi - C. Cerri - G. Capone
Incrocio* (2001)	Choreography: C. Griset Music: Pink Floyd; Costume and set design: Griset – Cerri
Fiori d'Irlanda* (2001)	Choreography: W. Mattini Music: Dmitri Shostakovich - Alfred Schnittke; Costume and set design: W. Matteini – I. Broeckx – C. Cerri
Oggi t'ho pensato* (2001)	Choreography: M. Merla Music: Various artists Costume and set design: C. Cerri
Psappha* (2001)	Choreography: Mauro Bigonzetti Music: Iannis Xenakis; Costume and set design: K. Millar, L. Sbandale, C. Cerri
Jimi Jimi* (2001)	Choreography: Mauro Bigonzetti Music: Jimi Hendrix; Costume and set design: P. Calafiore – C. Cerri
Les Noces* (2002)	Choreography: Mauro Bigonzetti Music: Igor Stravinsky; Costume and set design: K. Millar/L. Sbandale, C. Cerri – F. Montecchi
Petruška* (2002)	Choreography: Mauro Bigonzetti Music: Igor Stravinsky; Costume and set design: K. Millar/L. Sbandale, C. Cerri – F. Montecchi
Who gets this one* (2003)	Choreography: Mauro Bigonzetti Music: Frank Zappa; Costume and set design: C. Cerri
Blue* (2003)	Choreography: E. Scigliano Music: Jocelyn Pook – Arvo Pärt; Costume and set design: C. Cerri
Sciarada* (2003)	Choreography: Mauro Bigonzetti Music: Jan Garbarek; Costume and set design: L. Socci, C. Cerri
Cantata/parte II* (2003)	Choreography: Mauro Bigonzetti Music: Original and traditional music arranged and performed by the Gruppo Musicale ASSURD; Costume and set design: L. Socci, C. Cerri
Serenata* (2003)	Choreography: Mauro Bigonzetti Music: Original and traditional music arranged and performed by the Gruppo Musicale ASSURD; Costume and set design: H. Medeiros, L. Socci, C. Cerri
Rossini Cards* (2004)	Choreography: Mauro Bigonzetti Music: Gioachino Rossinii; Costume and set design: H. Medeiros, C. Cerri
Folía* (2004)	Choreography: A. Boissonnet Music: Anonymous – Spanish music of the fifteenth century Costume and set design: C. Cerri
Next* (2005)	Choreography: F. Monteverde Music: Johann Sebastian Bach Scene : C. Cerri
Passo Continuo* (2005)	Choreography: Mauro Bigonzetti Music: Anton Giulio Galeandro; Costume and set design: 7- Reggio Emilia, C. Cerri
WAM* (2005)	Choreography: Mauro Bigonzetti Music: Wolfgang Amadeus Mozart; Costume and set design: M. Millenotti, C. Cerri
Omaggio al Brasile* (2005)	Choreography: A. Boissonnet – V. Longo – P. Mangiola – A. Mano – W. Matteini Music: Various artists Costume and set design: C. Cerri
Vertigo* (2006)	Choreography: Mauro Bigonzetti Music: Dmitri Shostakovich; Costume and set design: G. Capone, C. Cerri
Après Midi D'Enfants* (2006)	Choreography: Mauro Bigonzetti Music: Ludwig van Beethoven Light design: C. Cerri
Romeo and Juliet* (2006)	Choreography: Mauro Bigonzetti Music: Sergei Prokofiev; Costume and set design: F. Plessi Light design: C. Cerri
Chant Pastoral* (2006)	Choreography: A. Boissonnet Music: Claude Debussy; Costume and set design: C. Cerri, L. Boissonnet
Saminas* (2006)	Choreography: V. Longo Music: Various artists
Absolutely Free* (2006)	Choreography: Mauro Bigonzetti Music: Various artists Light design: C. Cerri
Notte Morricone (2024)	Choreography: Marcos Morau Music: Ennio Morricone; Set design: Marc Salicrú; Costume: Silvia Delagneau

Reprises	Creative team
Ricercare a nove movimenti (1980)	Choreography: Amedeo Amodio Music: Antonio Vivaldi; Costume and set design: M. A. Gambaro
Le jeune homme et la mort (1980)	Choreography: R. Petit Music: Johann Sebastian Bach; Costume and set design: G. Wakhevitch
Parade (1980)	Choreography: Léonide Massine Music: Erik Satie; Costume and set design: Pablo Picasso
Dove Aspettando (1980)	Choreography: Amedeo Amodio Music: Edgard Varèse; Costume and set design: M. A. Gambaro
Lilac Garden (1981)	Choreography: Antony Tudor Music: Ernest Chausson; Costume and set design: D. Saponi, H. Stevenson
Allegro Brillante (1981)	Choreography: George Balanchine Music: Pyotr Ilyich Tchaikovsky; Costume and set design: Barbara Karinska
Sphinx (1981)	Choreography: Glen Tetley Music: Bohuslav Martinů; Costume and set design: R. Ter – Arutunian - W. Kim
Donizetti Variations (1981)	Choreography: George Balanchine Music: Gaetano Donizetti; Costume and set design: Barbara Karinska
Mythical Hunters (1981)	Choreography: Glen Tetley Music: Ödön Pártos; Costume and set design: M. Sandberg
E perché no? (1981)	Choreography: Amedeo Amodio Music: George Antheil - George Frideric Handel; Costume and set design: M. Sandberg - J. Cowell
Agon (1982) Orfeo	Choreography: George Balanchine Music: Igor Stravinsky; Choreography: José Limón; Music: Ludwig van Beethoven; Costume and set design: M. Sandberg
Rainbow Ripples (1982)	Choreography: Richard Alston Music: G. Amirkharian - G. H. Green; Costume and set design: D. Buckland
Se n'è gghiuto a Venezia (1982)	Choreography: Amedeo Amodio Music: Igor Stravinsky; Costume and set design: L. Spinatelli
Night Creature (1983)	Choreography: A. Ailey Music: Duke Ellington; Costume and set design: G. Greenwood
Après-midi d'un faune (1983)	Choreography: Amedeo Amodio Music: Claude Debussy; Costume and set design: C. V. Garner
Bournonville (1984)	Choreography: August Bournonville Music: Musicisti vari Costume and set design: J. Worsaee
Tre Preludi (1984)	Choreography: Ben Stevenson Music: Sergei Rachmaninoff
Love Songs (1984)	Choreography: William Forsythe Music: Aretha Franklin - Dionne Warwick; Costume and set design: E. Bra
Step Text (1985)	Choreography: William Forsythe Music: Johann Sebastian Bach; Costume and set design: William Forsythe
Raymonda Pas de Dix (1986)	Choreography: George Balanchine Music: Alexander Glazunov; Costume and set design: L. Spinatelli
The River (1986)	Choreography: A. Ailey Music: Duke Ellington; Costume and set design: C. Giannini
Twilight (1986)	Choreography: Hans van Manen Music: John Cage; Costume and set design: J. P. Wroom
Estri (1987)	Choreography: Aurel M. Milloss Music: Goffredo Petrassi
Unveiled (1987)	Choreography: K. Haigen Music: Antonín Dvořák; Costume and set design: K. Baker - J. Cowell
Greening (1988)	Choreography: Glen Tetley Music: Arne Nordheim; Costume and set design: N. Baylis
Apollon Musagete (1990)	Choreography: George Balanchine Music: Igor Stravinsky
Who Cares? (1991)	Choreography: George Balanchine Music: George Gershwin; Costume and set design: Barbara Karinska
Di qua di là dal mare (1992)	Choreography: Various artists Music: Various artists
Suite (1993)	Choreography: U. Scholz Music: Sergei Rachmaninoff; Costume and set design: M. Rupprecht
La Chambre (1994)	Choreography: R. Petit Music: Georges Auric; Costume and set design: B. Buffet
Return to a Strange Land (1994)	Choreography: Jiří Kylián Music: Leoš Janáček; Costume and set design: Jiří Kylián
Ni centre ni peripherie (1994)	Choreography: D. Byrd Music: Johann Sebastian Bach; Costume and set design: J. Kaplan
Scrutiny (1995)	Choreography: Choreography: D. Parsons Music: Michael Raye; Costume and set design: W. I. Long
Sonate à trois (1996)	Choreography: Maurice Béjart Music: Béla Bartók
Four point counter (1996)	Choreography: William Forsythe (dancer) Music: Thom Willems; Costume and set design: S. Gall
La Sonnambula (1997)	Choreography: George Balanchine Music: V. Rieti / Vincenzo Bellini; Costume and set design: G. Boitard
Bolero (1997)	Choreography: Maurice Béjart Music: Maurice Ravel
Pression (1999)	Choreography: Mauro Bigonzetti Music: Helmut Lachenmann - Franz Schubert; Costume and set design: Millard - Swandale
Kazimir's Colours (2000)	Choreography: Mauro Bigonzetti Music: Dmitri Shostakovich; Costume and set design: C. Cerri/L. Socci
Heart's Labyrinth (2001)	Choreography: Jiří Kylián Music: Harold C. Schonberg –Antonín Dvořák - Anton Webern; Costume and set design: Jiří Kylián – Caboort - Visser
Cantata (2002)	Choreography: Mauro Bigonzetti Music: Traditional music from Naples and southern Italy; Costume and set design: H. Medeiros – C. Cerri
Chameleon (2002)	Choreography: Itzik Galili Music: John Cage; Costume and set design: Natasja Lansen
3D (2002)	Choreography: Mauro Bigonzetti Music: David Byrne; Costume and set design: K. Millar/L. Sbandale, C. Cerri
Turbulence (2002)	Choreography: Mauro Bigonzetti Music: Michel Portal; Costume and set design: C. Cerri
Vespro (2003)	Choreography: Mauro Bigonzetti Music: Bruno Moretti; Costume and set design: G. Ascari e F. Saccani /Quinta Colonna C. Cerri
Tre parti di noi. (2003): Dedicated to Italo Calvino	Choreography: W. Matteini Music: Various artists Costume and set design: C. Cerri
Il corpo che narra. Trasformazioni (2004)	Choreography: A. Boissonnet – Beatrice Mille – Valerio Longo Music: Various artists Costume and set design: C. Cerri
ToBeOrNotToBe (2004)	Choreography: Mauro Bigonzetti Music: George Frideric Handel, Henry Purcell, Johann Sebastian Bach; Costume and set design: P. Calafiore, H. Medeiros, C. Cerri
Baby Gang (2004)	Choreography: Jacopo Godani Music: Bertrand Maillot
Romeo and Juliet (2007)	Choreography: Mauro Bigonzetti Music: Sergei Prokofiev; Costume and set design: Fabrizio Plessi
