= Mercurial Manoeuvres =

- Choreographer: Christopher Wheeldon
- Music: Dmitri Shostakovich
- Premiere: April 28, 2000; New York State Theater
- Original ballet company: New York City Ballet
- Design: Carole Divet

Mercurial Manoeuvres is a ballet choreographed by Christopher Wheeldon to Shostakovich's Piano Concerto No. 1, with costumes designed by Carole Divet. The ballet premiered on April 28, 2000 at the New York State Theater.

External videos
- NYC Ballet's Tyler Angle on Wheeldon's MERCURIAL MANOEUVRES, YouTube video

The first movement features a male soloist, two female demi-soloists, four male demi-soloists and a corps de ballet of twelve women. The second movement is a pas de deux. The entire cast then return to the stage for the final movement.

Mercurial Manoeuvres was made as part of the New York City Ballet's Diamond Project. The original cast includes Miranda Weese, Jock Soto, Edwaard Liang, Audrey Morgan and Elena Diner. When the ballet was made, Wheeldon was dancing with the company as a soloist. He retired from performing after Mercurial Manoeuvres to become a full-time choreographer.

In 2020, in response to the impacts of the coronavirus pandemic on the performing arts, the New York City Ballet will release a 2017 video recording of the pas de deux from Mercurial Manoeuvres, featuring Tiler Peck and Tyler Angle.
