= Mauro Bigonzetti =

Italian ballet dancer and choreographer

- Born: 1960 (age 65–66); Rome, Italy
- Career
- Current group: Aterballetto

Mauro Bigonzetti (born 1960) is an Italian ballet dancer and choreographer. He trained at the ballet school of Teatro dell'Opera di Roma and entered their company in 1979.

In 1983 Bigonzetti joined the Reggio Emilia company Aterballetto, renowned for its contemporary repertory. He first began to choreograph for Aterballetto in 1990. In 1993 he joined Balletto di Toscana as resident choreographer and in 1997 returned to Aterballetto as artistic director.

Throughout his choreographic career Bigonzetti has maintained a close relationship with Aterballetto. He continues there as principal choreographer, although his career now centers on commissions written for major companies abroad. He served as director of La Scala Ballet in 2016 but resigned for health reasons after eight months.

== Choreography ==
His works have been staged by the Teatro dell'Opera di Roma, Balletto di Toscana, Deutsche Oper Berlin, Ankara State Ballet, English National Ballet, Julio Bocca & Ballet Argentino, Gauthier Dance, Stuttgart Ballet, Staatsoper Dresden, Ballet Gulbenkian and most recently the City Ballet of São Paulo, Brazil. For the New York City Ballet he created Vespro in 2002, In Vento 2006 and Oltremare 2008, in collaboration with the composer Bruno Moretti.

His latest work, Le Quattro Stagioni, featuring Vivaldi's famous concertos, was premiered by the Grands Ballets Canadiens on 24 May 2007, to universal critical acclaim.

== Works ==
- Pression (1994) - Balletto Di Toscana - Florence, Italy
- Songs (1997) - Aterballetto - Reggio Emilia, Italy
- Cantata (2001) - Gulbenkian Ballet - Lisbon, Portugal
- Les Noces (2002) - Aterballetto - Reggio Emilia, Italy
- Rossini Cards (2004) - Aterballetto - Reggio Emilia, Italy
- Wam (2005) - Aterballetto - Reggio Emilia, Italy
- Vertigo (2006) - Aterballetto - Reggio Emilia, Italy
- Romeo & Juliet (2006) - Aterballetto - Reggio Emilia, Italy
- InCanto (2007) - Aterballetto - Reggio Emilia, Italy
- Terra (2008) - Aterballetto - Reggio Emilia, Italy
- Come Un Respiro (2009) - Aterballetto - Reggio Emilia, Italy
- Caravaggio (2009)- Staatsballett Berlin - Berlin, Germany
- Certe Notti (2009) - Aterballetto - Milan, Italy
- Intermezzo (2012) - Aterballetto - Reggio Emilia, Italy
- Alice (2014) - Gauthier Dance - Stuttgart, Germany
- Cinderella (2015) - Compagnia Della Scala - Milan, Italy

== See also ==
- Category:Ballets by Mauro Bigonzetti
