= An American in Paris (ballet) =

Ballet by Christopher Wheeldon to music by George Gershwin

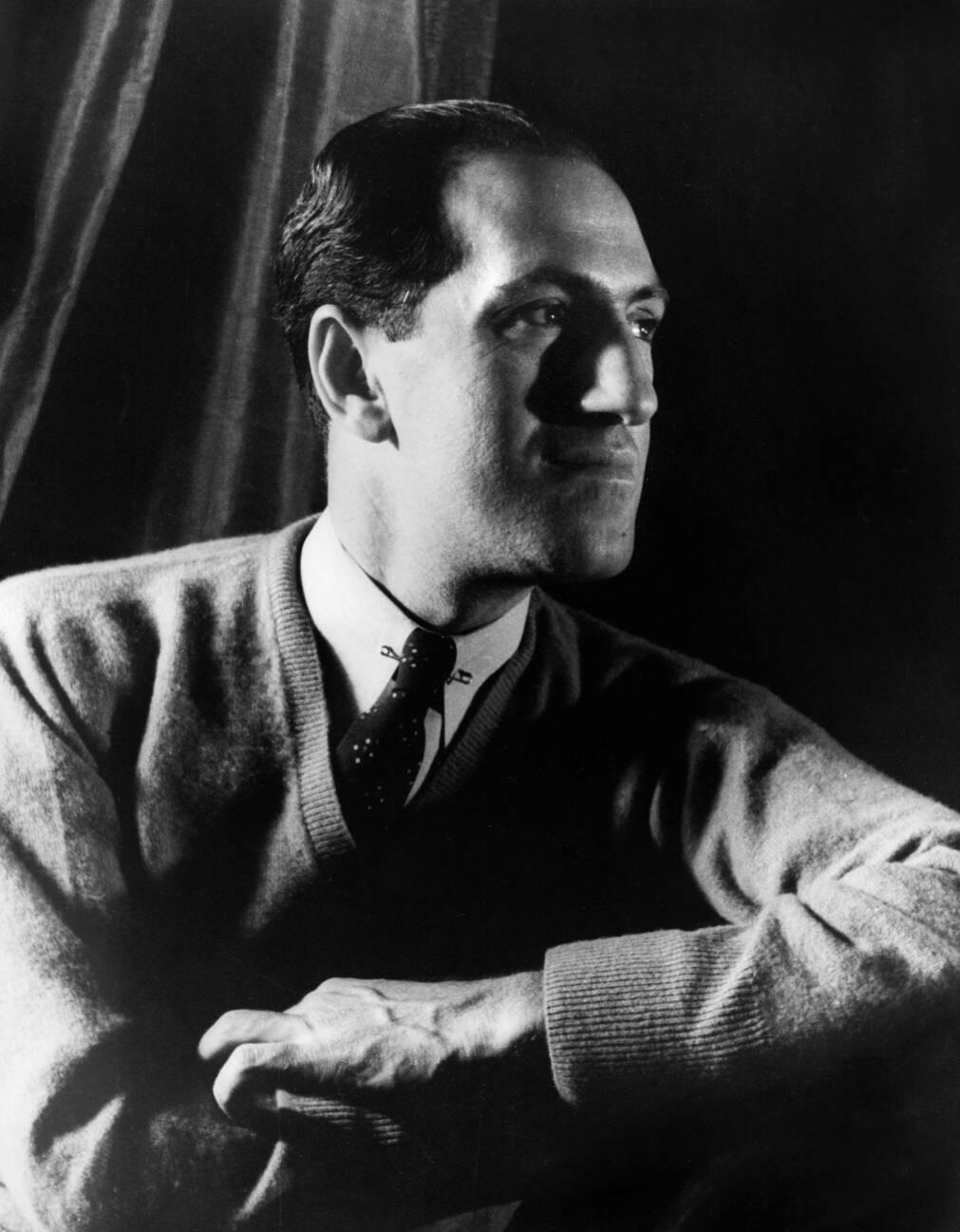
- George Gershwin in 1937
- Choreographer: Christopher Wheeldon
- Music: George Gershwin
- Premiere: May 4, 2005; New York State Theater
- Original ballet company: New York City Ballet
- Design: Holly Hynes; Adrianne Lobel; Natasha Katz

An American in Paris is a one-act ballet choreographed by Christopher Wheeldon, to the eponymous music by George Gershwin, costumes designed by Holly Hynes, sets designed by Adrianne Lobel and lighting designed by Natasha Katz. The ballet premiered on May 4, 2005, at the New York State Theater. Wheeldon later directed and choreographed the musical adaptation of the An American in Paris film.

== Production ==
Choreographer Christopher Wheeldon was first invited to choreograph the musical version of the film An American in Paris, though the project was abandoned. Wheeldon, who said George Gershwin's orchestral piece of the same name was "a great piece of classical music" in addition to being a film score, decided to make a ballet version instead.

On the choreography, Wheeldon said he wanted to create a more "balleticize" version with his own choreography, as the film's choreography is simple and uninteresting, but the cinematography made the film work on screen. He said he considered to have one of the dancers be off pointe, but went against it as it is a ballet. The set, designed by Adrianne Lobel, was inspired by Georges Braque and Pablo Picasso. Holly Hynes and Natasha Katz were brought in to design costumes and lighting respectively.

An American in Paris premiered on May 4, 2005, at the New York State Theater, the three lead roles were originated by Carla Körbes, Jenifer Ringer and Damian Woetzel, and Andrea Quinn conducted the orchestra. The ballet received mixed reviews. The reviewer for The New York Times wrote that Wheeldon was "clever in capturing idealized Paris street life" though "the dance never quite coheres." Another Times reviewer wrote that the scenes were unmemorable but "well crafted that the overall result is amiable entertainment." Wheeldon later claimed he "never felt entirely happy" with the ballet.

== Musical ==
Wheeldon later went on to direct and choreograph musical adaptation of the An American in Paris film, which was Wheeldon's directorial debut. The musical opened at the Théâtre du Châtelet, Paris in 2014, Palace Theatre, Broadway in 2015, and Dominion Theatre, West End in 2017. NYCB principal dancer Robert Fairchild and Royal Ballet's Leanne Cope originated the roles Jerry Mulligan and Lise Dassin respectively. Wheeldon was awarded the Tony Award for Best Choreography.
