= Heather Watts =

American ballet dancer

- Born: Linda Heather Watts; September 27, 1953 (age 72); Long Beach, California, U.S.
- Occupation: Ballet dancer
- Spouse: Damian Woetzel (m. 1999)

Heather Watts (born Linda Heather Watts; September 27, 1953) is a former ballet dancer, teacher, and costume designer most known for her time with the New York City Ballet.

== Biography ==
Born in Long Beach, California, (Linda) Heather Watts dreamed as a little girl of becoming an actress. An acting coach—recognizing both the dramatic flair and clumsiness of this troublesome child—advised her to take ballet classes. So, Watts took up dancing at age 10–"to develop poise." At age 13, she came to New York on a summer scholarship from the Ford Foundation to attend the School of American Ballet, the official school of the New York City Ballet. She moved permanently to New York at age 15, with yet another Ford Foundation scholarship to the School of American Ballet.

In 1970, Watts joined the New York City Ballet and, in 1979, was promoted to principal dancer by company co-founder George Balanchine, who said he did "not [want to ] let such a talent disappear." During her tenure with the company, choreographers Jerome Robbins, Balanchine, and Peter Martins, among others, created numerous principal roles specifically for her. Balanchine also gave her lead roles in many of his existing masterpieces, including Agon, Concerto Barocco, Apollo, Symphony in C, Theme and Variations, and Serenade. Watts performed around the world and starred in many Dance in America television programs. At the White House, she and frequent partner Mikhail Baryshnikov performed Balanchine's Rubies for President and Mrs. Carter, an event that was nationally televised. She retired from the stage in a gala performance at Lincoln Center in 1995; and married fellow New York City Ballet Principal Damian Woetzel in 1999.

In addition to her dancing career, Watts was director of the New York State Summer School of the Arts in Saratoga Springs from 1982 to 1994, where she administered a ballet school for gifted children. Watts has directed many national and international dance touring companies, including a tour entitled "Homage a Balanchine" of 108 cities for Columbia Artists, and she has rehearsed and staged ballets around the world. She has also designed costumes for new ballets at the New York City Ballet, as well as for Off-Broadway productions. Watts was a founding board member of Gods Love We Deliver and also served on the board of Friends In Deed, both services for persons living with AIDS—she was among the first artists to join the fight against AIDS in the mid-1980s. She is the co-author, with fellow NYCB collaborator Jock Soto, of the cookbook "Our Meals: Making a Home for Family and Friends" (Riverhead, 1997). Among the many awards that Watts has received are Jerome Robbins Award, the Dance Magazine Award, the L'Oreal Shining Star Award, the Lions of the Performing Arts Award from the New York Public Library, and various state awards for education. She has appeared on the Charlie Rose Show, Good Morning America, and the CBS Morning News among other programs. Watts has served as a panelist for the National Endowment for the Arts, and currently serves on the Artists Committee for the Kennedy Center Honors, and on the selection committee for the Bessie Awards 2011 in New York City.

Watts has been a contributing editor at Vanity Fair magazine since 1995. She currently covers arts and culture for the magazine, and is the photographer Bruce Weber's editor. She has also written articles for Vanity Fair, as well as Italian Vogue, L'Uomo Vogue, and Dance Magazine among other publications. She was one of the official technical consultants for the motion-picture Black Swan.

Watts was the Class of 1932 Visiting Lecturer in Dance at Princeton University for 2011-12. Watts also co-created a new seminar for the Dance Education Laboratory at the 92nd Street Y, and has taught master ballet classes at Hunter College. She currently serves on Hunter's Dance Advisory Board. In addition, Watts taught academic courses in 2006 and 2007 on Balanchine's life and work at Harvard University as a Visiting Lecturer. For her work at Harvard, Watts received two Derek Bok awards for distinguished teaching.

In January 2012, Watts received a Doctorate in Fine Arts honoris causa from Hunter College.

== Sources ==
- A Prima Ballerina Takes a Final Bow - The New York Times
- Heather Watts, An Unlikely Swan, In Her Final Song - The New York Times
- Heather Watts on The Charlie Rose Show
- Jeté Propelled: Stars and Students Mingle at the Harvard Dance Center - Harvard Magazine
- The Ballerina Gallery
