= Damian Woetzel =

American dancer (born 1967)

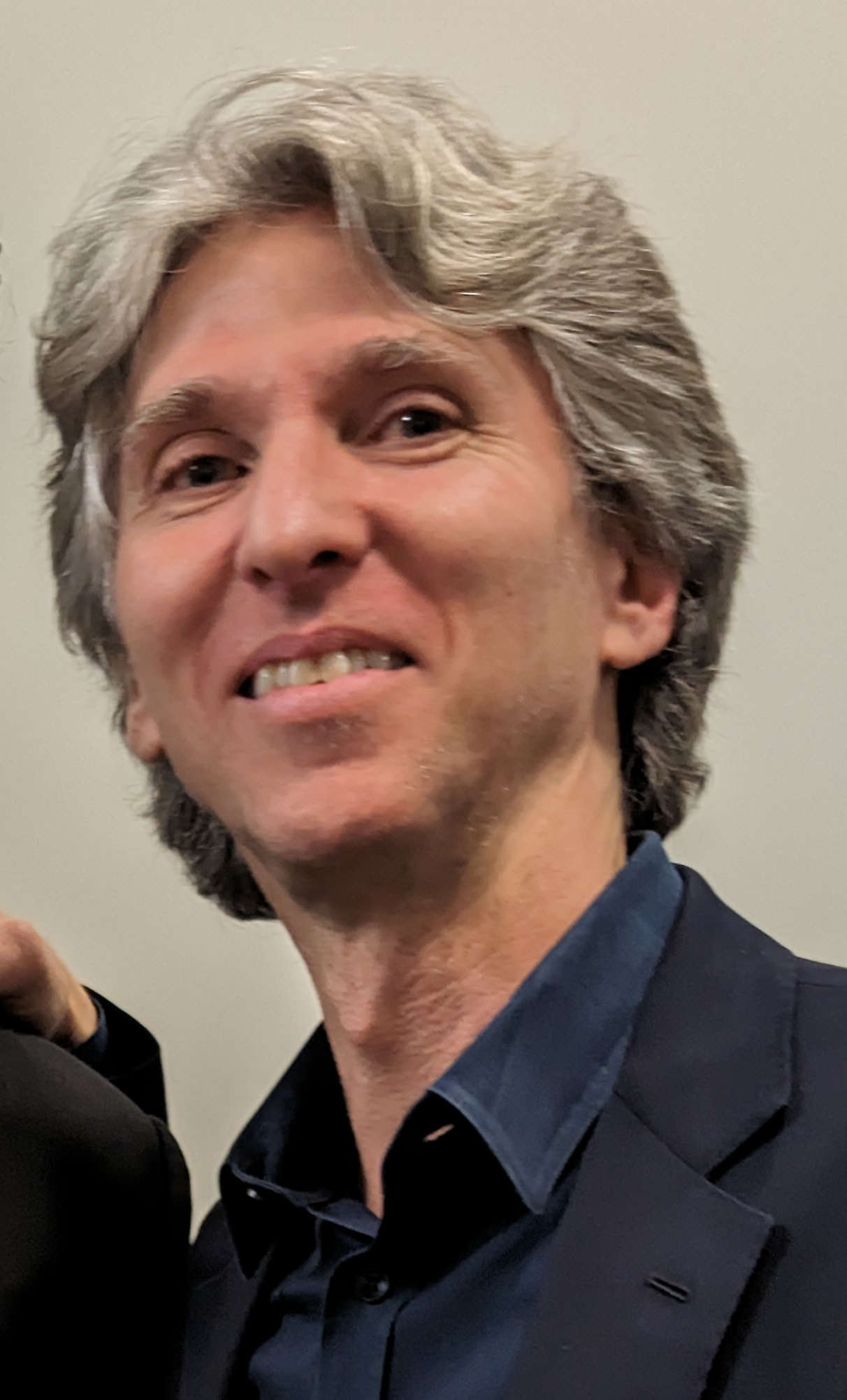
- Woetzel in 2024

7th President of the Juilliard School
- Incumbent
- Assumed office July 2018
- Preceded by: Joseph W. Polisi

Personal details
- Born: May 17, 1967 (age 59)
- Spouse: Heather Watts
- Education: School of American Ballet; Harvard University (MPA)
- Awards: Harvard Arts Medal (2005)

Damian Woetzel (born May 17, 1967) is an American choreographer.

Woetzel was a principal dancer with the New York City Ballet, where he performed from 1985 until 2008. He also frequently performed with companies like the Kirov Ballet and American Ballet Theatre, until his retirement from the stage in 2008. Woetzel has also choreographed a number of ballets for NYCB and other companies.

Among his awards, Woetzel has received the Harvard Arts Medal. and the inaugural Gene Kelly Legacy Award.

In May 2017, Woetzel was named President of the Juilliard School, replacing Joseph W. Polisi.

== Early life and education ==
Woetzel was originally trained in Boston at E. Virginia Williams ballet school, studying with Williams and Violette Verdy, and then moved to Los Angeles at 15 where he studied with Irina Kosmovska at the Los Angeles Ballet School. He then joined John Clifford's Los Angeles Ballet and toured nationally with this company including to New York City where he made his debut at the Joyce Theater. He received praise in all the press including from The New Yorker Magazine’s notoriously demanding critic, Arlene Croce, for his performance in Young Apollo, which Clifford choreographed for him. At 17, Woetzel moved to New York City to attend the School of American Ballet and study with Stanley Williams and Andrei Kramarevsky. He performed in the school's annual workshop in 1985 and then joined the New York City Ballet, where he rose through the ranks and became a principal dancer in 1989. In 2007, he earned an MPA degree from the John F. Kennedy School of Government at Harvard University.

== Career as director and producer ==
=== Aspen Institute ===
Woetzel was the Director of Arts Programs at the Aspen Institute from 2011 to 2018. Under Woetzel's direction events curated by the Aspen Institute Arts Program include: the inaugural US-China Forum on the Arts and Culture in Beijing, in partnership with Asia Society and the Chinese People's Association for Friendship with Foreign Countries. American and Chinese artists and cultural representatives engaged in the forum included Joel Coen, Meryl Streep, Yo-Yo Ma, Alice Waters, Liu Ye, and Ge You. In June 2012, the Arts Program curated multiple sessions, film screenings and cultural exchanges at the Aspen Ideas Festival. In October 2012, the Arts Program hosted the inaugural Aspen Arts Strategy Group, convening over 30 arts leaders from around the nation in New York City. In December 2012, Woetzel and cellist Yo-Yo Ma organized a participatory visit to the Walter Reed National Military Medical Center in Bethesda, MD, where musician Arthur Bloom and his MusiCorps program help wounded warriors to overcome injuries and recover their lives through intensive music practice.

=== Vail Dance Festival ===
Since 2006, Woetzel has been the artistic director of the Vail Dance Festival, where he presents dance performances and commissions.

Under Woetzel's direction, the festival has received wide acclaim for its innovation and growth as a nationally recognized showcase for dance, featuring such performances as the debut of Morphoses/The Wheeldon Company, and the launch of New York City Ballet MOVES. The annual International Evenings of Dance galas have become renowned for Woetzel's curation of first-time partnerships across companies and countries, as well as the presentation of young, emerging stars making their debuts in new repertory. In August 2012, The New York Times' Alastair Macaulay wrote that the 2012 Vail International Dance Festival presentations "were distinguished above all by catholic taste and brilliant programming. They merit superlatives" and that the International Evenings I gala "was simply the best gala I have attended in decades." Writing the same week, Wendy Perron of Dance Magazine compared Woetzel to the legendary impresario Serge Diaghilev, and praised Woetzel for engaging and educating audiences through spoken introductions to each work, and for his commitment to collaboration with live musicians. Woetzel has instituted a number of other initiatives as director, including bringing the educational arts program "Celebrate The Beat" - the Colorado associate of Jacques d'Amboise's National Dance Institute - to the Vail Valley, to reach local underserved children in the public schools.

=== Lil Buck @ Le Poisson Rouge ===
In April 2013, Woetzel directed and produced a "jookin' jam session" at New York's Le Poisson Rouge, featuring the Memphis jooker Charles "Lil Buck" Riley with special guests including dancer Ron "Prime Tym" Myles, Yo-Yo Ma (cello), Marcus Printup (trumpet), Cristina Pato (galician bagpipe), John Hadfield (percussion) and the ensemble Brooklyn Rider. The evening featured a specially commissioned world premiere for solo cello by Philip Glass, co-choreographed by Woetzel and Lil Buck. Alastair Macaulay wrote in The New York Times, “As Lil Buck performed with an array of distinguished musicians on Tuesday night at Le Poisson Rouge, a series of extraordinary windows seemed to open, each revealing a new and imagined realm.” Charles “Lil Buck” Riley and Ron “Prime Tyme” Myles were awarded Bessies in the Outstanding Performance category for their appearances in Lil Buck @ Le Poisson Rouge.

=== Tribute Events and Galas ===
In December 2012, Woetzel co-produced the tribute to legendary ballerina Natalia Makarova as part of the 35th annual Kennedy Center Honors, and in 2014 he co-produced the tribute to ballerina Patricia McBride. For his contributions to the Emmy Award-winning CBS special, Woetzel was honored by the Academy of Television Arts & Sciences for the 2012-2013 Primetime Emmy Awards.

In 2009 and 2010, Woetzel produced and directed the World Science Festival Gala Performances at Lincoln Center's Alice Tully Hall. For the 2010 event he created an arts salute to science honoring the theoretical physicist Stephen Hawking, featuring performances by Yo-Yo Ma, John Lithgow, and Kelli O’Hara among others.

=== New Essential Works Program ===
In the fall of 2009, Woetzel co-founded and began directing the Jerome Robbins Foundation's New Essential Works (NEW) Program, which supports choreographers and dance companies during the current financial crisis by giving grants to enable the production of new works.

=== Studio 5 Performance Series ===
In 2009, Woetzel launched the Studio 5 performance series at New York's City Center, which featured in-depth examinations of dance artists and companies highlighted by in-studio performances and demonstrations; topics of discussion ranged from musicality to collaboration to musical theatre; and featured companies included American Ballet Theatre, the Paul Taylor Dance Company and Dance Theater of Harlem.

=== Arts Strike ===
In June 2010 Woetzel piloted "Arts Strike," a new effort to have celebrated artists engage educators and students, schools and communities, highlighting and sharing the unique power of the arts to empower, enrich and educate. The first events have taken place in Vail, Chicago, Los Angeles, New York, and Washington, D.C., and almost all have featured Woetzel with Yo-Yo Ma in schools, engaging with students and their teachers to promote learning through the arts. Most recently, Woetzel piloted the High Line Arts Education Project, an Arts Strike organized in New York in collaboration with architect Elizabeth Diller.

=== Silk Road Connect ===
Woetzel works with Yo-Yo Ma on his Silk Road Connect program in the New York City Public Schools. In June 2010, Woetzel directed the culminating year-end event which took place at New York's Museum of Natural History, and featured the participation of the Silk Road Ensemble and 450 6th grade students. In June 2011, the culminating year-end event opened the Central Park SummerStage series. Titled “Night at the Caravanserai: Tales of Wonder,” the performance again featured hundreds of 6th grade students from New York-area public schools, Ma with his Silk Road Ensemble, vocalist Bobby McFerrin, the soprano Emalie Savoy, actor Bill Irwin, and author Jhumpa Lahiri, among others.

In April 2011, Woetzel organized an "arts strike" at Inner-City Arts in downtown Los Angeles with Yo-Yo Ma, The Silk Road Ensemble, and Memphis jooker Charles "Lil Buck" Riley. The event included a demonstration and workshop for more than one hundred elementary school students from the Los Angeles Unified School District. Highlighting the event was a first-time duet directed by Woetzel between Ma and Lil Buck, who performed a Memphis Jookin' version of The Dying Swan with Ma accompanying on the cello; the performance was immortalized in a video shot by Spike Jonze which reached over one million views within weeks.

=== Harvard Law School ===
In the fall of 2010, Woetzel was a visiting Lecturer at Harvard Law School, where he co-taught a course on Performing Arts and the Law with Jeannie Suk. The course explored many intersections of the arts and law, from copyright law, to courtroom performance to celebrity law, with guests including playwright John Guare, actor Alec Baldwin, and Balanchine Trust Co-Founding Trustee Barbara Horgan.

=== New York State Summer School for the Arts ===
Woetzel was the artistic director of the New York State Summer School for the Arts School of Ballet from 1994 to 2007.

== Dance career ==
=== New York City Ballet ===
Woetzel joined New York City Ballet in 1985, and was a principal dancer from 1989 until his retirement from the stage in 2008. At New York City Ballet, Woetzel had works created for him by Jerome Robbins, Eliot Feld, Twyla Tharp, Susan Stroman and Christopher Wheeldon among others, and danced more than 50 featured roles in the company's repertory, including: George Balanchine's: Agon, Coppélia, The Prodigal Son, Slaughter on Tenth Avenue, Stars and Stripes, Swan Lake; and Jerome Robbins': Afternoon of a Faun, Fancy Free, Dances at a Gathering, A Suite of Dances, and West Side Story Suite.

Woetzel originated featured roles in: Jerome Robbins' Ives, Songs and Quiet City, Eliot Feld's The Unanswered Question and Organon, Twyla Tharp's The Beethoven Seventh, Christopher Wheeldon's An American in Paris, Carousel, Evenfall, Morphoses, and Variations sérieuses, Peter Martins' Jeu de cartes and The Sleeping Beauty, and Susan Stroman's "The Blue Necklace" from Double Feature. Woetzel also originated roles in ballets by Kevin O'Day, Richard Tanner and Lynne Taylor-Corbett, among others.

Woetzel appeared in Dance in America's presentation of "Dinner with Balanchine," dancing Union Jack and Stars and Stripes. In May 1999, he starred as Prince Siegfried in Peter Martins' Swan Lake on the PBS national telecast "Live from Lincoln Center." Woetzel also appeared in the 2002 nationally televised Live from Lincoln Center broadcast "New York City Ballet's Diamond Project: Ten Years of New Choreography" on PBS and in the May 2004 Live from Lincoln Center broadcast of "Lincoln Center Celebrates Balanchine 100." Woetzel starred as the Cavalier in the film version of George Balanchine's The Nutcracker, released in the winter of 1993. In October 1998, Mr. Woetzel appeared as one of the stars of the Cole Porter musical Jubilee in a special benefit performance at Carnegie Hall, during which he sang as well as danced.

=== Guest appearances ===
During his career, Woetzel frequently performed internationally as a guest star and was a visiting artist with numerous companies including the Kirov Ballet and American Ballet Theatre. In his guest appearances, Woetzel danced principal roles in classics such as Don Quixote, Giselle, and La Bayadere among others, in addition to his NYCB repertory.

=== Choreography ===
Woetzel has choreographed a number of ballets for New York City Ballet, among other companies. For New York City Ballet, he choreographed Ebony Concerto to Stravinsky, and Glazounov Pas de Deux to the composer's Les Ruses d'Amour. Woetzel also choreographed the "Polovtsian Dances" for New York City Opera's production of Prince Igor, and in 1998, he choreographed and starred in a new version of An American in Paris ballet for Marvin Hamlisch's Gershwin Centennial Gala.

== Honors and appointments ==
In 2015, Woetzel was awarded the Harvard Arts Medal.

In July 2012, Woetzel was honored with the inaugural Gene Kelly Legacy Award – an award jointly created by the Dizzy Feet Foundation and the Estate of Gene Kelly in honor of the 100th anniversary of Kelly's birth – for his contributions to the arts as a ballet star and director of dance and music performances.

He serves on the Artists Committee of the Kennedy Center Honors and as a judge for the Astaire Awards. He has also served as a juror for the Princess Grace Awards. Woetzel was the 2008 Harman-Eisner Artist in Residence of the Aspen Institute, and in 2011, he became a member of the Knight Foundation's National Arts Advisory Committee. Woetzel serves on the boards of directors of New York City Center, The Clive Barnes Foundation and The Sphinx Organization.

In November 2009, President Obama appointed Woetzel to the President's Committee on the Arts and Humanities.

== Education ==
Woetzel holds a Master in Public Administration Degree from Harvard's Kennedy School of Government.

== Personal life ==
Woetzel has been married to fellow New York City Ballet Principal Dancer Heather Watts since 1999.
