= Alexandra Ansanelli =

American ballet dancer

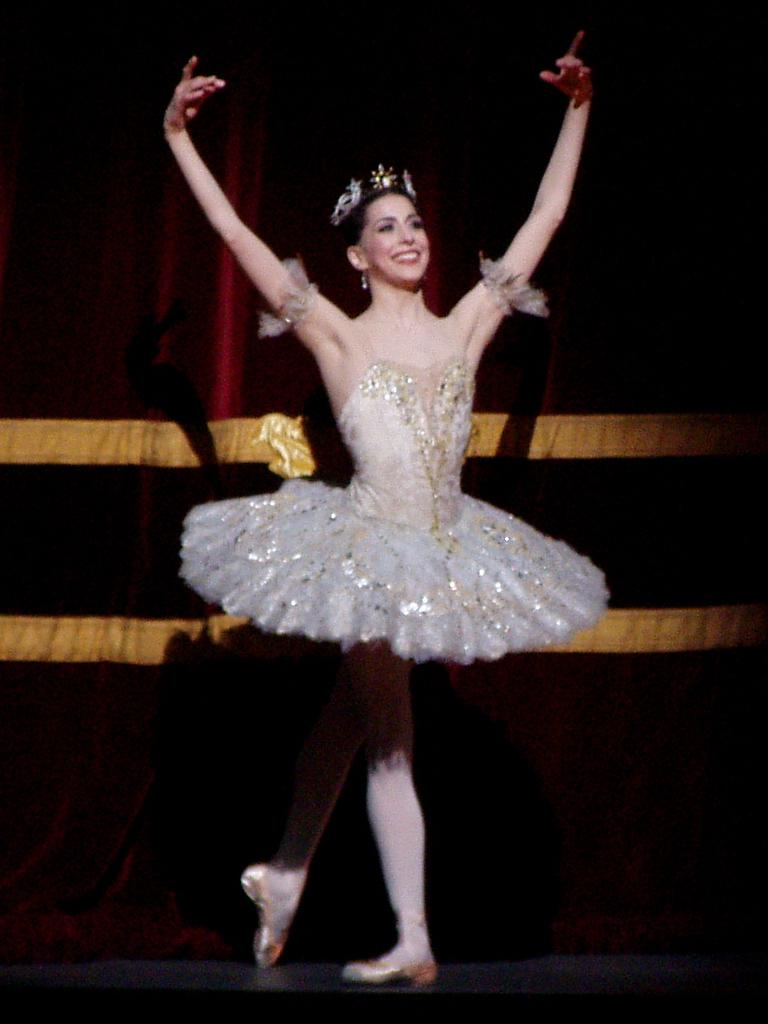
- Ansanelli as Aurora in the Royal Ballet production of Sleeping Beauty on April 29, 2008
- Born: Alexandra Noel Ansanelli; Manhasset, Long Island, New York
- Education: Columbia University School of General Studies
- Occupation: Ballet dancer
- Career
- Former groups: New York City Ballet (1996–2005); The Royal Ballet (2006–09)

Alexandra Noel Ansanelli is a retired American ballet dancer who was a Principal dancer at New York City Ballet and the Royal Ballet prior to her retirement at a relatively young age.

== Early life ==
Ansanelli was born in Manhassett, Long Island and is the youngest of three daughters and five half brothers from her father's previous marriage.

Ansanelli attended Friends Academy in Locust Valley, New York, and was an athlete. While at a summer arts program, Belvoir Terrace, in Lenox, Massachusetts. Edward Villella, who was visiting his daughter, suggested Alexandra audition for the School of American Ballet in NYC. In the fall of 1991, Alexandra auditioned for SAB and was accepted at age eleven. In 1993, Ansanelli moved into New York City where she attended the Professional Children's School.

== Career ==
Ansanelli joined New York City Ballet at the age of fifteen after performing in some children's roles and stayed with the company until age 24. She was able to return to performances following a significant injury, became a principal dancer in May 2003 and received recognition for her scope of work.

On July 30, 2005, Ansanelli announced her departure from the New York City Ballet. In December 2005 Ansanelli moved to London, England, to join The Royal Ballet as a first soloist and was promoted to principal ballerina in July 2007.

She retired from dance in 2009 at age 28 and subsequently enrolled at Columbia University.

In 2011, Ansanelli received the Jerome Robbins Award, became a board member of the Professional Children's School and Clive Barnes Awards.

== Image gallery ==
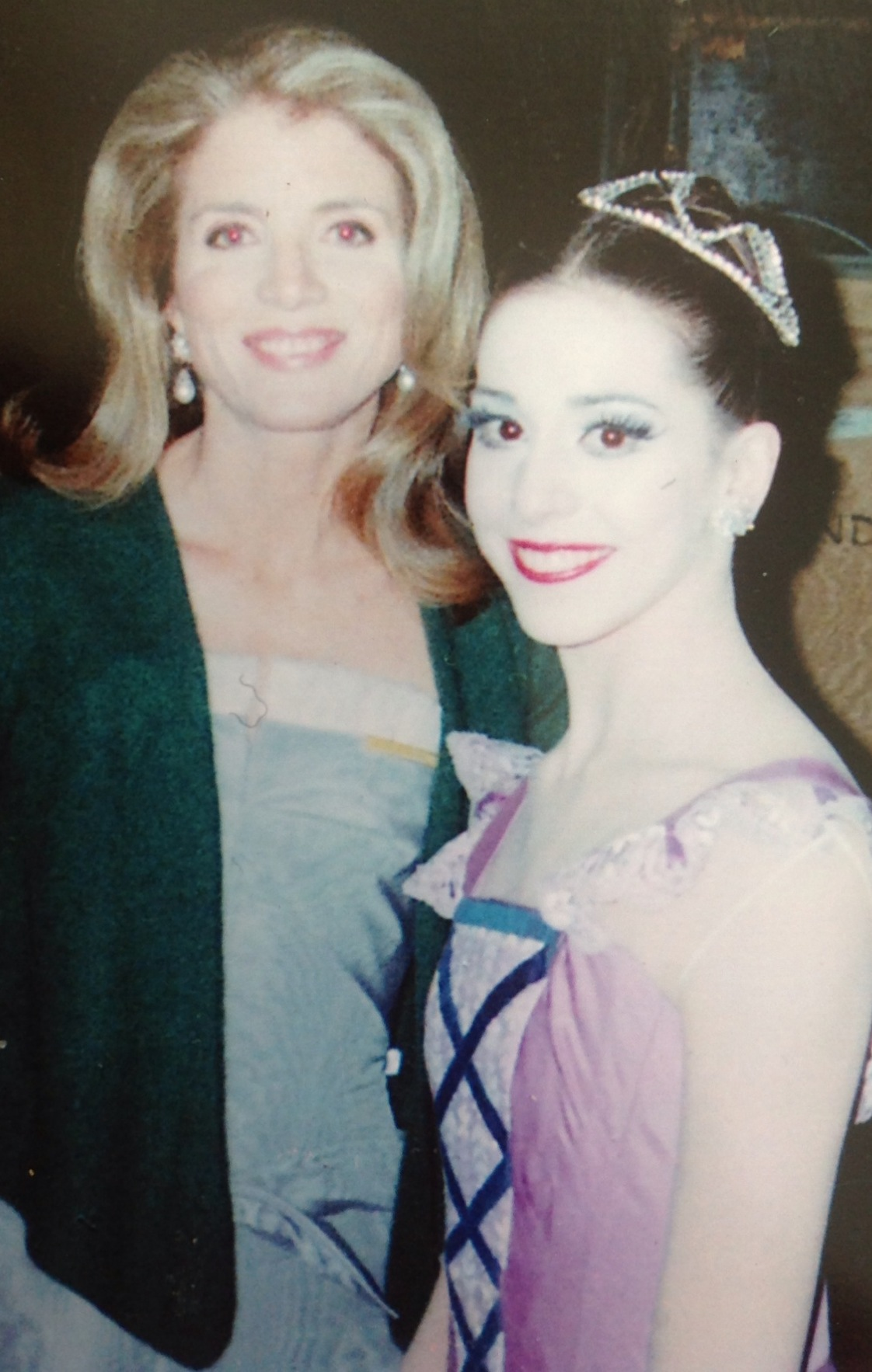
Alexandra Ansanelli with Caroline Kennedy at the Kennedy Center

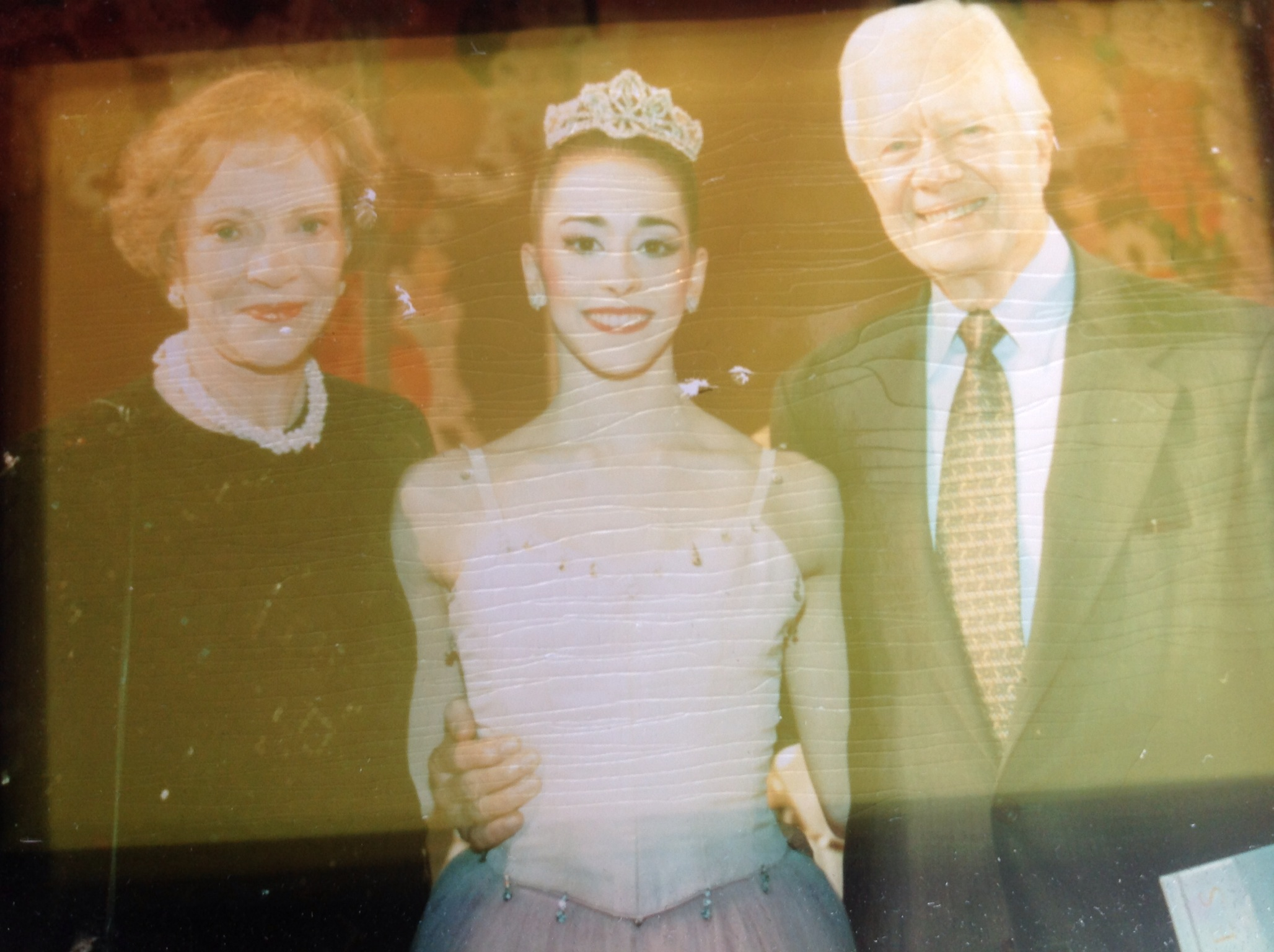
Alexandra Ansanelli with President Carter and wife Rosalynn following a Nutcracker performance as Sugar Plum

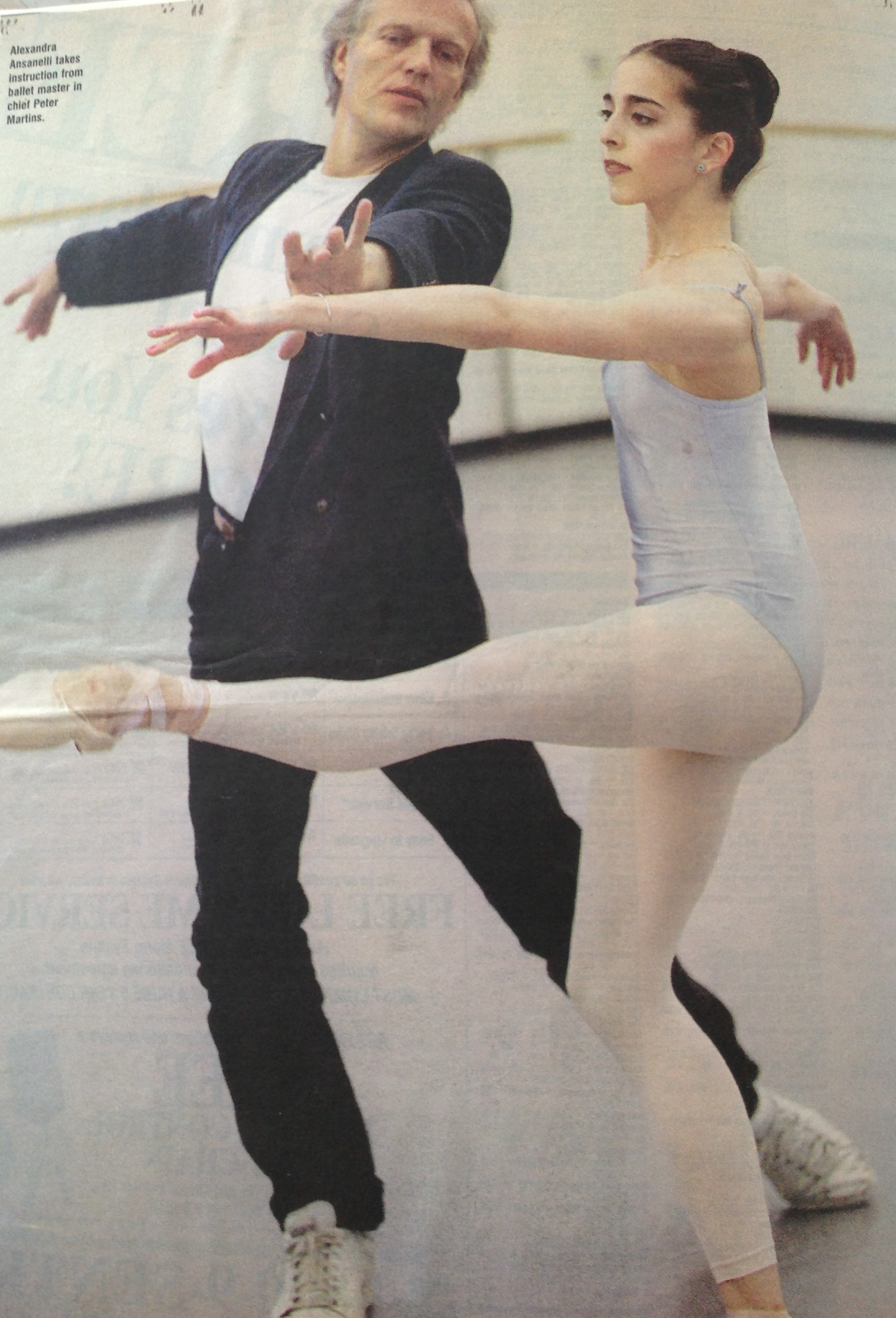
Alexandra Ansanelli being coached by balletmaster Peter Martins at New York City Ballet
