= Diamond Project =

The Diamond Project was inaugurated May 27, 1992, at New York City Ballet with funding from the Irene Diamond Fund. It has presented — every two to four years — work by new choreographers.

== Choreographers ==
=== 1992 ===
- David Allan
- John Alleyne
- Bart Cook
- William Forsythe
- Robert La Fosse
- Miriam Mahdaviani
- Peter Martins
- Toni Pimble
- Alexandre Proia
- Richard Tanner
- Lynne Taylor-Corbett

=== 1994 ===
- David Allan
- John Alleyne
- Ulysses Dove
- Anna Laerkesen
- Robert La Fosse
- Miriam Mahdaviani
- Trey McIntyre
- Kevin O'Day
- Peter Martins
- Richard Tanner
- Lynne Taylor-Corbett
- Damian Woetzel

=== 1997 ===
- Christopher d'Amboise
- Robert La Fosse
- Miriam Mahdaviani
- Kevin O'Day
- Angelin Preljocaj
- Christopher Wheeldon

=== 2000 ===
- Christopher d'Amboise
- Miriam Mahdaviani
- Kevin O'Day
- Helgi Tomasson
- Christopher Wheeldon

=== 2002 ===
- Melissa Barak
- Stephen Baynes
- Mauro Bigonzetti
- Albert Evans
- Miriam Mahdaviani
- Peter Martins
- Christopher Wheeldon

=== 2006 ===
- Mauro Bigonzetti
- Jean-Pierre Bonnefoux
- Jorma Elo *
- Eliot Feld
- Peter Martins
- Alexei Ratmansky *
- Christopher Wheeldon

== Notes ==
* first time choreographer has worked with NYCB

== Articles ==
- June 20, 2006 John Rockwell, NY Times
- April 28, 2006 Jennifer Dunning, NY Times
- May 9, 2006 Deborah Jowitt, Village Voice
- May 5, 2002 Anna Kisselgoff, NY Times
- April 23, 2002 Kate Mattingly Moran, Village Voice
- July 11, 2000 Deborah Jowitt, Village Voice
- June 26, 1994 Anna Kisselgoff, NY Times

== Reviews ==
- June 17, 2002 Anna Kisselgoff, NY Times
- June 24, 2002 Jack Anderson, NY Times
- May 10, 2002 Anna Kisselgoff, NY Times
- May 6, 2002 Anna Kisselgoff, NY Times
- June 29, 1997 Anna Kisselgoff, NY Times
