= Albert Evans (dancer) =

American ballet dancer and choreographer (1968–2015)

- Born: Albert Pierce Evans; December 29, 1968; Atlanta, Georgia, U.S.
- Died: June 22, 2015 (aged 47); Mount Sinai Hospital, New York City, U.S.
- Education: School of American Ballet
- Occupations: Ballet dancer; choreographer
- Years active: 1988–2010
- Career
- Former groups: New York City Ballet

Albert Pierce Evans (December 29, 1968 – June 22, 2015) was an American ballet dancer and choreographer. He joined the New York City Ballet in 1988, became a principal dancer in 1995, making him the second African American dancer to hold this position, and had pursue choreography. He retired from performing in 2010, then served as a ballet master until his death.

== Early life ==
Evans was born in Atlanta. He started training in ballet and modern dance after watching The Nutcracker on television. In 1986, he entered the School of American Ballet on full scholarship.

== Career ==
In 1988, Evans joined the New York City Ballet. He was soon given lead roles by choreographers Eliot Feld and William Forsythe, both for NYCB's American Music Festival. He was also cast in other lead roles while being a corps de ballet member. He was promoted to soloist in 1991 and principal dancer in 1995. He was the second African American principal dancer in the company, after Arthur Mitchell, and the sole one during his career. Though he had never worked with George Balanchine, he was known for performing his works. Choreographers he had created roles for includes Alexei Ratmansky, Christopher Wheeldon and Susan Stroman. While he was still performing, he started pursuing choreography, his works include Haiku, Broken Promises, both for NYCB, and Seego for The Washington Ballet.

In June 2010, Evans retired after performing the third (Phlegmatic) variation from Balanchine's The Four Temperaments and Forsythe's Herman Schmerman pas de deux, partnering Wendy Whelan. He then served as a ballet master with the company. He also became an assistant to resident choreographer Justin Peck, and appeared in the documentary Ballet 422, which follows the creation process of Peck's Paz de la Jolla.

== Death ==
On June 22, 2015, Evans died at the Mount Sinai Hospital in New York City following a short illness.
