= Jennifer Dunning =

Writer and critic (born 1942)

Jennifer Dunning (born February 4, 1942) was a writer and critic for The New York Times on the subjects of dance and ballet. She is the author of the 1985 But First a School: The First Fifty Years of the School of American Ballet, the 1996 Alvin Ailey, a Life in Dance, and the 1997 Great Performances: A Celebration.

Dunning was born in New York City and studied dance. In 1977 she became the ballet critic for The New York Times. She retired from the paper in 2008.
