= Anna Kisselgoff =

American academic and critic

- Born: January 12, 1938 (age 88); Paris, France
- Occupations: Critic, reporter

Anna Kisselgoff (born 12 January 1938) is a dance critic and cultural news reporter for The New York Times. She began at the Times as a dance critic and cultural news reporter in 1968, and became its Chief Dance Critic in 1977, a role she held until 2005. She left the Times as an employee at the end of 2006, but still contributes to the paper.

== Biography ==
She was born on 12 January 1938 in Paris. Kisselgoff began studying ballet at the age of four in New York City with Valentina Belova, and later for nine years with Jean Yazvinsky. She graduated from Bryn Mawr College, and then studied French History at the Sorbonne and Russian at the School of Oriental Languages in Paris. Later, she received an M.A. in European History and an M.A. in journalism at Columbia University.

Before joining The New York Times, she wrote features and dance reviews as a freelancer for the New York Times International Edition and worked at the English desk of Agence France-Presse in Paris.

== Other work ==
Aside from writing for the Times, Kisselgoff has taught ballet history at Yale University in 1980 and a Contemporary Choreographers course at Barnard College in 1982, 1984, and 1986. She also lectured at Hollins University from 2006 to 2008. Kisselgoff has also worked as a consultant, and wrote the foreword for Bronislava Nijinska: Early Memoirs.

== Awards ==
- Knight of the Order of the Dannebrog by Queen Margrethe II of Denmark
- Chevalier of the Order of Arts and Letters by the French Government
- Order of the Falcon by the President of Iceland

== Writing awards ==
- Distinguished Alumni Award from the Columbia Graduate School of Journalism
- Honorary Doctorate from Adelphi University
- Dean's Award for Distinguished Achievement from the Columbia University Graduate School of Arts and Sciences
- Ernie from Dance/USA in 2008
