= List of ballets by title =

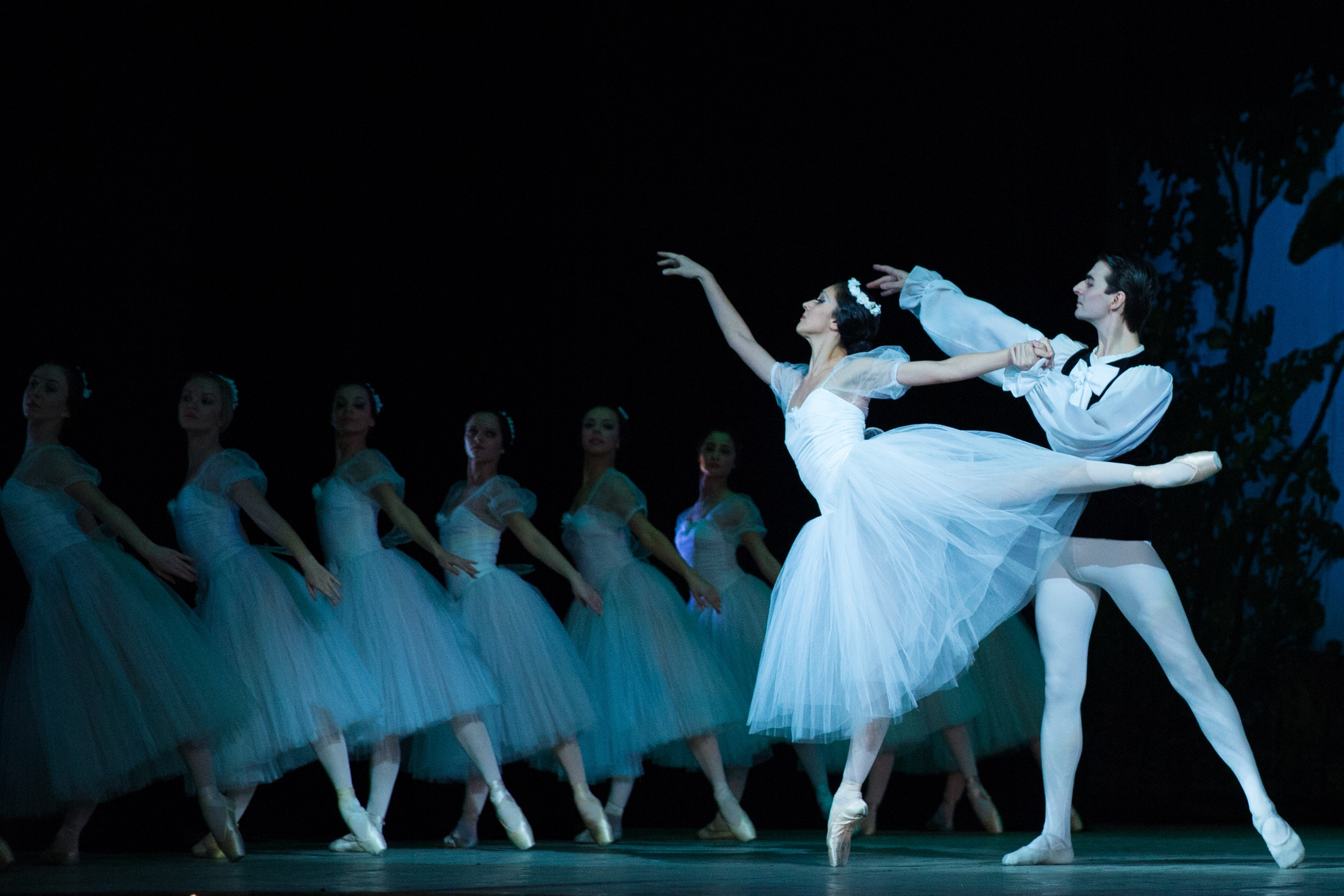
Scene from Les Sylphides

The following is a list of ballets with entries in English Wikipedia. The entries are sorted alphabetically by ballet title, with the name of the composer (or the composer to whose music the ballet is set) and the year of the first performance.

== Alphabetical listing ==
=== 1 ===
- 2 and 3 Part Inventions, to music by Johann Sebastian Bach, 1994

=== A ===
- Adam Zero, Arthur Bliss, 1946
- Adams Violin Concerto, to music by John Adams, 1995
- Adagio Hammerklavier, to music by Ludwig van Beethoven, 1973
- Afternoon of a Faun (Nijinsky), to music by Claude Debussy, 1912
- Afternoon of a Faun (Robbins), to music by Claude Debussy, 1953
- Afternoon of a Faun (Rushton), to music by Claude Debussy, 2006
- After the Rain, to music by Arvo Pärt, 2005
- Agon, Igor Stravinsky, 1957
- Alice's Adventures in Wonderland, Joby Talbot, 2011
- Allegro Brillante, to music by Pyotr Ilyich Tchaikovsky, 1956
- An American in Paris, to music by George Gershwin, 2005
- El amor brujo, Manuel de Falla, 1915
- Anastasia, to music by Bohuslav Martinů, Pyotr Ilyich Tchaikovsky, Fritz Winckel, and Rüdiger Rüfer, 1967
- Andantino, to music by Pyotr Ilyich Tchaikovsky, 1981
- Les Animaux modèles, Francis Poulenc, 1942
- Anna Karenina, to music by Pyotr Ilyich Tchaikovsky, 2005
- Antique Epigraphs, to music by Claude Debussy, 1984
- Apollo, Igor Stravinsky, 1928
- Appalachia Waltz, Mark O'Connor and Edgar Meyer, 2000
- Appalachian Spring, Aaron Copland, 1944
- Arabian Nights, Fikret Amirov, 1979
- Arcade, to music by Igor Stravinsky, 1963
- Aschenbrödel, Johann Strauss II, 1901
- Ash, to music by Michael Torke, 1991
- Astarte, Crome Syrcus, 1967
- Aubade, Francis Poulenc, 1929
- Les Aventures de Pélée, Ludwig Minkus, 1876

=== B ===
- Babek, Agshin Alizadeh, 1986
- Bacchus and Ariadne, Albert Roussel, 1931
- Backchat, to music by Paul Lansky, 2004
- Le Baiser de la fée, Igor Stravinsky, 1928
- Baldurs draumar, Geirr Tveitt, 1938
- Ballet Comique de la Reine, 1581
- Ballet de la Merlaison, 1635
- Ballet égyptien, Alexandre Luigini, 1875
- Ballet Royal de la Nuit, Jean-Baptiste Lully, 1653
- Ballo della Regina, to music by Giuseppe Verdi, 1978
- Il ballo delle ingrate, Claudio Monteverdi, 1608
- The Bandits, Ludwig Minkus, 1875
- Bar aux Folies-Bergère, to music by Emmanuel Chabrier, 1934
- Barbe-Bleue, Peter Schenck, 1896
- Barber Violin Concerto, to music by Samuel Barber, 1988
- La Bayadère, Ludwig Minkus, 1877
- Bayou, to music by Virgil Thomson, 1952
- The Beauty of Lebanon or The Mountain Spirit, Cesare Pugni, 1863
- Beethoven Romance, to music by Ludwig van Beethoven, 1989
- Bella Figura, to music by Lukas Foss, Giovanni Battista Pergolesi, Alessandro Marcello, Antonio Vivaldi, Giuseppe Torelli, 1995
- The Benevolent Cupid, Cesare Pugni, 1868
- Les Biches, Francis Poulenc, 1924
- Billboards, to music by Prince, 1993
- Billy the Kid, Aaron Copland, 1938
- Birthday Offering, to music by Alexander Glazunov, 1956
- Black and White, Michael Torke, 1988
- Blake Works I, to music by James Blake, 2016
- The Blue Dahlia, Cesare Pugni, 1860
- Le Bœuf sur le toit, Darius Milhaud, 1920
- La Boîte à joujoux, Claude Debussy, 1919
- Boléro, Maurice Ravel, 1928
- The Bolt, Dmitri Shostakovich, 1931
- Le Bourgeois Gentilhomme, to music by Richard Strauss, 1932
- La Boutique fantasque, Ottorino Respighi, 1919
- Brahms/Handel, to music by Johannes Brahms, 1984
- Brahms–Schoenberg Quartet, to music by Johannes Brahms, 1966
- Brandenburg, to music by Johann Sebastian Bach, 1997
- Broken Wings, Pater Salem, 2016
- Bugaku, Toshiro Mayuzumi, 1963

=== C ===
- The Cage, to music by Igor Stravinsky, 1951
- Camargo, Ludwig Minkus, 1872
- Carmen, to music by Georges Bizet, 1949
- Carmen Suite, to music Rodion Shchedrin adapted from Bizet's Carmen, 1967
- Carmina Burana, choreographed by Alice Reyes, 1974
- Carnaval, to music by Robert Schumann, 1910
- Carnival of the Animals, to music by Camille Saint-Saëns, 2003
- Caroline Mathilde, Peter Maxwell Davies, 1991
- Carousel, to music by Richard Rodgers, 2002
- Catarina or La Fille du bandit, Cesare Pugni, 1846
- Cave of the Heart, Samuel Barber, 1947
- The Cellist, Philip Feeney, 2020
- Chaconne, to music by Christoph Willibald Gluck, 1976
- The Chairman Dances, John Adams, 1988
- Le Chant du rossignol, Igor Stravinsky, 1920
- Checkmate, Arthur Bliss, 1937
- Chichester Psalms, to music by Leonard Bernstein, 2004
- Chout, Sergei Prokofiev, 1921
- Chroma, Joby Talbot, 2006
- Cigale, Jules Massenet, 1904
- Cinderella (Fitinhof-Schell), Baron Boris Fitinhoff-Schell, 1893
- Cinderella (Prokofiev), Sergei Prokofiev, 1945
- Cinderella (Ashton), Sergei Prokofiev, 1948
- Circus Polka, Igor Stravinsky, 1942
- Cléopâtre, to music by Anton Arensky, Alexander Taneyev, Nikolai Rimsky-Korsakov, Mikhail Glinka, Alexander Glazunov, Modeste Mussorgsky, Nikolai Tcherepnin, 1909
- The Concert, to music by Frédéric Chopin, 1956
- Concerto, to music by Dmitri Shostakovich, 1966
- Concerto Barocco, to music by Johann Sebastian Bach, 1941
- Concerto DSCH, to music by Dmitri Shostakovich, 2008
- Le Conservatoire, to music arranged by Holger Simon Paulli, 1849
- Coppélia, Léo Delibes, 1870
- Correlazione, to music by Arcangelo Corelli, 1994
- Corroboree, John Antill, 1950
- Le Corsaire, Adolphe Adam, 1856
- Corybantic Games, to music by Leonard Bernstein, 2018
- La Création du monde, Darius Milhaud, 1923
- The Creatures of Prometheus, Ludwig van Beethoven, 1801
- Creole Giselle, Adolphe Adam, 1984
- Cydalise et le Chèvre-pied, to music by Gabriel Pierné, 1924
- Le Cygne, Charles Lecocq, 1899

=== D ===
- Dance Panels, Aaron Copland, 1963
- Dance Preludes, to music by Witold Lutosławski, 1991
- Dances at a Gathering, to music by Frédéric Chopin, 1969
- Danses concertantes, to music by Igor Stravinsky, 1955
- Daphnis et Chloé, Maurice Ravel, 1912
- The Daughter of the Snows, Ludwig Minkus, 1879
- Delight of the Muses, Charles Wuorinen, 1992
- Deuce Coupe, to music by The Beach Boys, 1973
- Les Deux pigeons, André Messager, 1886
- Le Diable amoureux, Napoléon Henri Reber and François Benoist, 1840
- Le Diable boiteux, Casimir Gide, 1836
- Le Diable à quatre, Adolphe Adam, 1845
- Le Dieu bleu, Reynaldo Hahn, 1912
- Different Drummer, to music by Anton Webern and Arnold Schoenberg, 1984
- The Display, Malcolm Williamson, 1964
- Divertimento No. 15, to music by Wolfgang Amadeus Mozart, 1956
- Don Juan, Christoph Willibald Gluck, 1761
- Don Quixote, Ludwig Minkus, 1869
- Double Feature, to music by Irving Berlin and Walter Donaldson, 2004
- The Dream, to music by Felix Mendelssohn, 1964
- Duo Concertant, to music by Igor Stravinsky, 1972
- Dust, Jocelyn Pook, 2014
- Dybbuk, Leonard Bernstein, 1974
- The Dying Swan, to music by Camille Saint-Saëns, 1905

=== E ===
- Echo, to music by Michael Torke, 1989
- Ecstatic Orange, to music by Michael Torke, 1987
- Edward II, John McCabe, 1995
- Élégie, to music by Igor Stravinsky, 1982
- Elite Syncopations, to music by Scott Joplin, 1974
- The Enchanted Forest, Riccardo Drigo, 1887
- Enigma Variations, to music by Edward Elgar, 1968
- Episodes, to music by Anton Webern, 1959
- La Esmeralda, Cesare Pugni, 1844
- Estancia, Alberto Ginastera, 1941
- L'Etoile de Grenade, Cesare Pugni, 1855
- Études, to music by Carl Czerny, 1948
- L'Éventail de Jeanne, Maurice Ravel, Pierre-Octave Ferroud, Jacques Ibert, Alexis Roland-Manuel, Marcel Delannoy, Albert Roussel, Darius Milhaud, Francis Poulenc, Georges Auric, Florent Schmitt, 1927
- Everywhere We Go, Sufjan Stevens, 2014

=== F ===
- Façade, to music by William Walton, 1931
- Fall River Legend, Morton Gould, 1948
- Fancy Free, Leonard Bernstein, 1944
- Fanfare, to music by Benjamin Britten, 1953
- Faust, to music by Giacomo Panizza, Michael Costa, and Niccolò Bajetti, 1848
- Les Fêtes chinoises, Jean-Philippe Rameau, 1754
- Fiametta, Ludwig Minkus, 1863
- La Fille de marbre, Cesare Pugni, 1847
- La Fille du Danube, Adolphe Adam, 1836
- La Fille mal gardée, to an arrangement of fifty-five popular French airs, 1789
- La Fille mal gardée (Ashton), Peter Ludwig Hertel, Ferdinand Hérold, John Lanchbery, 1960
- La Fin du jour, to music by Maurice Ravel, 1979
- The Firebird, Igor Stravinsky, 1910
- Five, Charles Wuorinen, 1988
- Five Brahms Waltzes in the Manner of Isadora Duncan, to music by Johannes Brahms, 1976
- Five Movements, Three Repeats, to music by Max Richter and Clyde Otis, 2012
- Flames of Paris, Boris Asafyev, 1932
- Flight Pattern, to music by Henryk Górecki, 2017
- Flit of Fury/The Monarch, to music by Aaron Severini, 2008
- Flore et Zéphire, Cesare Bossi, 1796
- Florida, Cesare Pugni, 1866
- Flower Festival in Genzano, to music by Edvard Helsted and Holger Simon Paulli, 1858
- A Folk Tale, Johan Peter Emilius Hartmann and Niels Gade, 1854
- The Fool on the Hill, to music by The Beatles, 1976
- The Fountain of Bakhchisarai, Boris Asafyev, 1934
- Four Bagatelles, to music by Ludwig van Beethoven, 1974
- Four Last Songs, to music by Richard Strauss, 1970
- The Four Seasons, to music by Giuseppe Verdi, 1979
- The Four Temperaments, Paul Hindemith, 1946
- Franca Florio, regina di Palermo, Lorenzo Ferrero, 2007
- Friandises, Christopher Rouse, 2006
- Frizak the Barber, Ludwig Minkus, 1879

=== G ===
- Gaîté Parisienne, to music by Jacques Offenbach, 1938
- Gayane, Aram Khachaturian, 1942
- Les Gentilhommes, to music by George Frideric Handel, 1987
- Gershwin Piano Concerto, to music by George Gershwin, 1982
- The Girl in White, Robert J. Bradshaw, 2011
- Giselle, Adolphe Adam, 1841
- Glass Pieces, to music by Philip Glass, 1983
- Gloria, to music by Francis Poulenc, 1980
- The Goldberg Variations, to music by Johann Sebastian Bach, 1971
- The Golden Age, Dmitri Shostakovich, 1930
- The Good-Humoured Ladies, to music by Domenico Scarlatti, 1917
- Gorda, David Toradze, 1949
- Graduation Ball, to music by Johann Strauss II, 1940
- Grazioso, to music by Mikhail Glinka, 2007
- Great Galloping Gottschalk, to music by Louis Moreau Gottschalk, 1982
- The Green Table, Fritz Cohen, 1932
- La Guiablesse, William Grant Still, 1927
- La Guirlande de Campra, Georges Auric, Arthur Honegger, Jean-Yves Daniel-Lesur, Alexis Roland-Manuel, Francis Poulenc, Henri Sauguet, Germaine Tailleferre, 1966

=== H ===
- Hallelujah Junction, to music by John Adams, 2001
- The Hard Nut, Pyotr Ilyich Tchaikovsky, 1991
- The Harlem Tulip, Baron Boris Fitinhoff-Schell, 1887
- Harnasie, Karol Szymanowski, 1935
- Las Hermanas, to music by Frank Martin, 1971
- Hérodiade, Paul Hindemith, 1944
- L'Histoire de Manon, to music by Jules Massenet, 1974
- Homage to the Queen, Malcolm Arnold, 1953
- L'Homme et son désir, Darius Milhaud, 1918
- Horoscope, Constant Lambert, 1938
- Hurry Up, We're Dreaming, to music by Anthony Gonzalez, Yann Gonzalez, Brad Laner and Justin Meldal-Johnsen, 2018

=== I ===
- I'm Old Fashioned, to music by Jerome Kern, 1983
- L'Île Enchantée, Arthur Sullivan, 1864
- Images to music by Claude Debussy, 1992
- Impressing the Czar, to music by Thom Willems, Leslie Stuck, and Ludwig van Beethoven, 1988
- In Creases, to music by Philip Glass, 2012
- The Incredible Flutist, Walter Piston, 1938
- In G Major, to music by Maurice Ravel, 1975
- Initials R.B.M.E., to music by Johannes Brahms, 1972
- In Memory Of ..., to music by Gustav Mahler and Johann Sebastian Bach, 1985
- In the Countenance of Kings, to music by Sufjan Stevens, 2016
- Interplay, to music by Morton Gould, 1945
- In the Mi(d)st, to music by Oliver Knussen, 2002
- In the Night, to music by Frédéric Chopin, 1970
- In Vento, Bruno Moretti, 2006
- The Invitation, Mátyás Seiber, 1960
- Isadora, to music by Richard Rodney Bennett, 1981
- Ives, Songs, to music by Charles Ives, 1988
- Ivesiana, to music by Charles Ives, 1954

=== J ===
- Jack in the Box, Erik Satie, 1926
- Jardin aux lilas, to music by Ernest Chausson, 1936
- Jason et Médée, Jean-Joseph Rodolphe, 1763
- Jazz Calendar, Richard Rodney Bennett, 1968
- Jeu de cartes (Balanchine), Igor Stravinsky, 1937
- Le Jeune homme et la mort, to music by Johann Sebastian Bach, 1946
- Jeux, Claude Debussy, 1913
- Jewels, to music by Gabriel Fauré, Igor Stravinsky, and Pyotr Ilyich Tchaikovsky, 1967
- Job: A Masque for Dancing, Ralph Vaughan Williams, 1931
- Josephslegende, Richard Strauss, 1914
- The Judas Tree, Brian Elias, 1992

=== K ===
- Kalkabrino, Léon Minkus, 1891
- Kammermusik No. 2, to music by Paul Hindemith, 1978
- Kënga e Rexhës, Akil Mark Koci, 1982
- The Kermesse in Bruges, to music by Holger Simon Paulli, 1851
- Khamma, Claude Debussy, 1947
- The King's Command or The Pupils of Dupré, to music by Albert Vizentini, 1886

=== L ===
- The Lady and the Fool, to music by Giuseppe Verdi, 1954
- The Lady in the Ice, Jean-Michel Damase, 1953
- Lamentation, to music by Zoltán Kodály, 1930
- Laurencia, Alexander Crain, 1939
- Leda, the Swiss Milkmaid, Adalbert Gyrowetz, 1821
- Leili and Majnun, Gara Garayev, 1969
- Liebeslieder Walzer, to music by Johannes Brahms, 1960
- Lifecasting, to music by Steve Reich and Ryoji Ikeda, 2009
- Like Water for Chocolate, to music by Joby Talbot and a scenario by Christopher Wheeldon and Talbot, 2022
- The Limpid Stream, Dmitri Shostakovich, 1935
- The Little Humpbacked Horse, Cesare Pugni, 1864
- Liturgy, to music by Arvo Pärt, 2003
- The Loves of Mars and Venus, to music by Jean-Baptiste Lully, Jacques Paisible, Henry Purcell, Gottfried Finger, John Eccles, Jeremiah Clarke, and William Croft, 1717
- Le Lys, Léon Minkus, 1869

=== M ===
- The Magic Flute, Riccardo Drigo, 1893
- The Magic Mirror, Arseny Koreshchenko, 1903
- The Magic Pills, Ludwig Minkus, 1866
- Maiden Tower, Afrasiyab Badalbeyli, 1940
- Mam'zelle Angot, Charles Lecocq, 1943
- Marguerite and Armand, to music by Franz Liszt, 1963
- Les Mariés de la tour Eiffel, Georges Auric, Arthur Honegger, Darius Milhaud, Francis Poulenc, Germaine Tailleferre, 1921
- A Marriage During the Regency, Cesare Pugni, 1858
- Les Masques, to music by Francis Poulenc, 1933
- Mayerling, to music by Franz Liszt, 1978
- Medea, Samuel Barber, 1946
- Mercure, Erik Satie, 1924
- Mercurial Manoeuvres, to music by Dmitri Shostakovich, 2000
- The Merry Widow, to music by Franz Lehár, 1975
- Metastaseis and Pithoprakta, to music by Iannis Xenakis, 1968
- Midnight Sun, to music by Nikolai Rimsky-Korsakov, 1915
- A Midsummer Night's Dream, to music by Felix Mendelssohn, 1964
- Les Millions d'Arlequin, Riccardo Drigo, 1900
- Miracle in the Gorbals, Arthur Bliss, 1944
- The Miraculous Mandarin, Béla Bartók, 1926
- Miss Sally's Party, William Grant Still, 1940
- Mlada, Ludwig Minkus, 1879
- Monotones, to music by Erik Satie, 1965
- A Month in the Country, to music by Frédéric Chopin, 1976
- Monumentum pro Gesualdo, to music by Igor Stravinsky, 1960
- The Moor's Pavane, to music by Henry Purcell, 1949
- The Most Incredible Thing, Neil Tennant and Chris Lowe, 2011
- Mother Goose, Maurice Ravel, 1975
- Moves, ballet without music, 1959
- Movements for Piano and Orchestra, to music by Igor Stravinsky, 1963
- Mozartiana, to music by Pyotr Ilyich Tchaikovsky, 1933
- My Brother, My Sisters, to music by Arnold Schoenberg and Anton Webern, 1978

=== N ===
- Napoli, to music by Edvard Helsted, Holger Simon Paulli, Niels Gade, 1842
- Narkissos, Robert Prince, 1966
- Nénuphar, Nikolai Krotkov, 1890
- The Newcomers, to music by David Diamond, 1988
- Night and Day, Ludwig Minkus, 1883
- Nightingale, Mikhail Kroshner, 1939
- The Nightingale and the Rose, Bright Sheng, 2007
- Nine Sinatra Songs, to music by Frank Sinatra, 1982
- Noah and the Flood, to music by Igor Stravinsky, 1982
- Nobilissima Visione, Paul Hindemith, 1938
- Les Noces, Igor Stravinsky, 1923
- Noctambules, Humphrey Searle, 1956
- Notre-Dame de Paris, to music by Maurice Jarre, 1965
- The Nutcracker, Pyotr Ilyich Tchaikovsky, 1892
- The Nutcracker (Willam Christensen), Pyotr Ilyich Tchaikovsky, 1944
- The Nutcracker (Balanchine), Pyotr Ilyich Tchaikovsky, 1954
- N.Y. Export: Op. Jazz, Robert Prince, 1958

=== O ===
- Ocean's Kingdom, Paul McCartney, 2011
- Octet (Christensen), to music by Igor Stravinsky, 1958
- Octet (Martins), to music by Felix Mendelssohn, 2003
- Ode, to music by Igor Stravinsky, 1972
- Okon Fuoko, Leevi Madetoja, 1930
- Oklahoma!, Agnes de Mille, 1943
- Oltremare, Bruno Moretti, 2008
- Ondine, ou La Naïade, Cesare Pugni, 1843
- Ondine, Hans Werner Henze, 1958
- Onegin, to music by Pyotr Ilyich Tchaikovsky, 1965
- On the Dnieper, Sergei Prokofiev, 1932
- Opus 19/The Dreamer, to music by Sergei Prokofiev, 1979
- Les Orientales, to music by Alexander Glazunov, Christian Sinding, Anton Arensky and Edvard Grieg, 1910
- Orpheus, Igor Stravinsky, 1948
- Othello, Elliot Goldenthal, 1997
- Other Dances, to music by Frédéric Chopin, 1976
- Outlier, to music by Thomas Adès, 2010

=== P ===
- Pan Twardowski, Ludomir Różycki, 1921
- Le Papillon, Jacques Offenbach, 1860
- Pâquerette, François Benoist, 1851
- Paquita, Ludwig Minkus, 1846
- Parade, Erik Satie, 1917
- The Parisian Market or Le Marché des innocents, Cesare Pugni, 1859
- Le Pas d'acier, Sergei Prokofiev, 1927
- Pas de Deux, to music by Anton Webern, 1969
- Pas de légumes, to music by Gioachino Rossini, 1982
- Pas de Quatre, Cesare Pugni, 1845
- The Path of Thunder, Gara Garayev, 1958
- Les Patineurs, to music by Giacomo Meyerbeer, 1937
- Le Pavillon d'Armide, Nikolai Tcherepnin, 1907
- La Péri (Burgmüller), Friedrich Burgmüller, 1843
- La Péri (Dukas), Paul Dukas, 1912
- La Perle, Riccardo Drigo, 1896
- Les petits riens, Wolfgang Amadeus Mozart, 1778
- Petrushka, Igor Stravinsky, 1911
- The Pharaoh's Daughter, Cesare Pugni, 1862
- Piano Pieces, to music by Pyotr Ilyich Tchaikovsky, 1981
- Piano-Rag-Music (Bolender), to music by Igor Stravinsky, 1972
- Piano-Rag-Music (Martins), to music by Igor Stravinsky, 1982
- Pictures at an Exhibition, to music by Modest Mussorgsky, 2014
- Pillar of Fire, to music by Arnold Schoenberg, 1942
- Pineapple Poll, to music by Arthur Sullivan, 1951
- Pirates of Penzance – The Ballet!, to music by Arthur Sullivan, 1991
- Plainspoken, David Lang, 2010
- Play Without Words, Terry Davies, 2002
- Le Poisson doré, Ludwig Minkus, 1866
- Polyphonia, to music by György Ligeti, 2001
- The Prince of the Pagodas, Benjamin Britten, 1957
- The Prince of the Pagodas (MacMillan), Benjamin Britten, 1989
- Printemps, to music by Claude Debussy, 1972
- The Prodigal Son, Sergei Prokofiev, 1929
- The Prospect Before Us, to music by William Boyce, 1940
- Pulcinella, Igor Stravinsky, 1920
- Pulcinella Variations, to music by Igor Stravinsky, 2017

=== Q ===
- Queen at the Ballet, to music by Queen, 2004

=== R ===
- Radio and Juliet, to music by Radiohead, 2005
- Ragtime (I), to music by Igor Stravinsky, 1960
- Ragtime (II), to music by Igor Stravinsky, 1966
- The Rake's Progress, Gavin Gordon, 1935
- RAkU, Shinji Eshima, 2011
- Raymonda, Alexander Glazunov, 1898
- Raymonda Variations, Alexander Glazunov, 1961
- Red Detachment of Women, Du Mingxin, 1964
- The Red Poppy, Reinhold Glière, 1927
- The Red Shoes, to music by Bernard Herrmann, 2016
- Relâche, Erik Satie, 1924
- Les Rendezvous, to music by Daniel Auber, 1933
- Requiem, to music by Gabriel Fauré, 1976
- Requiem Canticles (Robbins), to music by Igor Stravinsky, 1966
- Requiem Canticles (Balanchine), to music by Igor Stravinsky, 1968
- Le Réveil de Flore, Riccardo Drigo, 1894
- Rhapsody, to music by Sergei Rachmaninoff, 1980
- The Rite of Spring, Igor Stravinsky, 1913
- The Rite of Spring (MacMillan), Igor Stravinsky, 1962
- River of Light, Charles Wuorinen, 1998
- Robert Schumann's Davidsbündlertänze, to music by Robert Schumann, 1980
- Robin Hood, to music by Erich Wolfgang Korngold, 1998
- Rococo Variations, to music by Pyotr Ilyich Tchaikovsky, 2008
- Rodeo, Aaron Copland, 1942
- Rodeo: Four Dance Episodes, to music by Aaron Copland, 2015
- Romeo and Juliet (Prokofiev), Sergei Prokofiev, 1938
- Romeo and Juliet (Cranko), Sergei Prokofiev, 1962
- Romeo and Juliet (MacMillan), Sergei Prokofiev, 1965
- Romeo and Juliet (Lavery), Sergei Prokofiev, 1965
- Romeo and Juliet (Nureyev), Sergei Prokofiev, 1977
- Romeo + Juliet, Sergei Prokofiev, 2007
- Romeo and Juliet (Pastor), Sergei Prokofiev, 2008
- La Rose, la violette et le papillon, Peter of Oldenburg, 1857
- Roxana, the Beauty of Montenegro, Ludwig Minkus, 1878
- The Runaway, to music by Nico Muhly, James Blake, Jay-Z and Kanye West, 2018
- Russian Seasons, to music by Leonid Desyatnikov, 2006

=== S ===
- The Sacrifices to Cupid, Ludwig Minkus, 1886
- Sahdji (ballet), William Grant Still, 1930
- Sandpaper Ballet, Leroy Anderson, 1999
- The Sanguine Fan, Edward Elgar, 1917
- Sarabande and Danse (Clifford), to music by Claude Debussy, 1970
- Sarabande and Danse (d'Amboise), to music by Claude Debussy, 1975
- Scènes de ballet (Stravinsky), Igor Stravinsky, 1944
- Scènes de ballet (Ashton), Igor Stravinsky, 1948
- Scènes de ballet (Wheeldon), Igor Stravinsky, 1999
- Scherzo à la Russe, to music by Igor Stravinsky, 1972
- Schlagobers, Richard Strauss, 1924
- Scotch Symphony, to music by Felix Mendelssohn, 1952
- The Seagull, Rodion Shchedrin, 1980
- The Seasons, Alexander Glazunov, 1900
- The Seasons (Cage), John Cage, 1947
- The Seasons' Canon, to music by Max Richter and Antonio Vivaldi, 2016
- Serenade, to music by Pyotr Ilyich Tchaikovsky, 1934
- Seven Beauties, Gara Garayev, 1952
- The Shagreen Bone, Yuri Khanon, 1992
- Simple Symphony (Walter Gore), to music by Benjamin Britten, 1944
- Simple Symphony, to music by Benjamin Britten, 2009
- Slaughter on Tenth Avenue, Richard Rodgers, 1936
- The Slave, Cesare Pugni, 1868
- The Sleeping Beauty, Pyotr Ilyich Tchaikovsky, 1890
- Slice to Sharp, to music by Antonio Vivaldi, 2006
- Sokoli e Mirusha, Akil Mark Koci, 1974
- Solitaire, to music by Malcolm Arnold, 1956
- La Somnambule, ou L'Arrivée d'un nouveau seigneur, Ferdinand Hérold, 1827
- Sonate di Scarlatti, to music by Domenico Scarlatti, 1979
- Sonatine, to music by Maurice Ravel, 1975
- Song of the Earth, to music by Gustav Mahler, 1965
- La sonnambula, to music by Vincenzo Bellini, 1946
- La Source (Saint-Léon), Léo Delibes and Ludwig Minkus, 1866
- La Source (Balanchine), to music by Léo Delibes, 1968
- Špalíček, Bohuslav Martinů, 1933
- Spartacus, Aram Khachaturian, 1956
- Le Spectre de la rose, to music by Carl Maria von Weber, 1911
- The Spider's Feast, Albert Roussel, 1912
- Square Dance, to music by Antonio Vivaldi and Arcangelo Corelli, 1957
- Stamping Ground, to music by Carlos Chávez, 1983
- Stars and Stripes, to music by John Philip Sousa, 1958
- The Steadfast Tin Soldier, to music by Georges Bizet, 1975
- Still Life at the Penguin Cafe, Simon Jeffes, 1988
- The Stone Flower, Alexander Fridlender, 1944
- Stravinsky Violin Concerto, to music by Igor Stravinsky, 1972
- A Suite of Dances, to music by Johann Sebastian Bach, 1994
- Suite of Dances, to music by Leonard Bernstein, 1980
- The Sun Also Rises, Billy Novick, 2013
- Swan Lake, Pyotr Ilyich Tchaikovsky, 1877
- Swan Lake (1895), Pyotr Ilyich Tchaikovsky, 1895
- Swan Lake (Balanchine), Pyotr Ilyich Tchaikovsky, 1951
- Swan Lake (Bourne), Pyotr Ilyich Tchaikovsky, 1995
- Sweeney Todd, Malcolm Arnold, 1959
- Swimmer, to music by Shinji Eshima, 2015
- La Sylphide, Jean Schneitzhoeffer, 1832
- Les Sylphides, to music by Frédéric Chopin, 1909
- Sylvia, Léo Delibes, 1876
- Symphonic Variations, to music by César Franck, 1946
- Symphony in C, to music by Georges Bizet, 1947
- Symphony in E flat, to music by Igor Stravinsky, 1972
- Symphony in Three Movements, to music by Igor Stravinsky, 1972
- Symphony No. 1, to music by Pyotr Ilyich Tchaikovsky, 1981

=== T ===
- The Tale of the Stone Flower, Sergei Prokofiev, 1954
- The Talisman, Riccardo Drigo, 1889
- The Taming of the Shrew, to music by Domenico Scarlatti, 1969
- Tango (Balanchine), to music by Igor Stravinsky, 1982
- Tango (Martins), to music by Igor Stravinsky, 1984
- Tarantella to music by Louis Moreau Gottschalk, 1954
- Terpsichore, Cesare Pugni, 1861
- Theme and Variations, to music by Pyotr Ilyich Tchaikovsky, 1947
- Thou Swell, to music by Richard Rodgers, 2003
- The Three-Cornered Hat, Manuel de Falla, 1919
- Three Preludes, to music by George Gershwin, 1992
- The Times Are Racing, to music by Dan Deacon, 2017
- Tiresias, Constant Lambert, 1951
- Titania, Cesare Pugni, 1866
- Le Tombeau de Couperin, to music by Maurice Ravel, 1975
- Tom Sawyer, to music by Maury Yeston, 2011
- Touch, Richard Peaslee, 1996
- A Tragedy of Fashion, to music by Eugene Goossens, 1926
- Le Train bleu, Darius Milhaud, 1924
- Trapèze, Sergei Prokofiev, 1924
- The Traveling Dancer, Cesare Pugni, 1864
- Triadisches Ballett, Paul Hindemith, 1922
- Tributary, to music by Wolfgang Amadeus Mozart, 2000
- Tribute, to music by Johann Sebastian Bach, 2005
- Tricolore, Georges Auric, 1978
- Trilby, Yuli Gerber, 1870
- Triptych, to music by Béla Bartók, 2000
- The Triumph of Death, Thomas Koppel, 1971
- Tsar Kandavl or Le Roi Candaule, Cesare Pugni, 1868
- Tschaikovsky Pas de Deux, to music by Pyotr Ilyich Tchaikovsky, 1960
- Tschaikovsky Piano Concerto No. 2, to music by Pyotr Ilyich Tchaikovsky, 1941
- Tschaikovsky Suite No. 3, to music by Pyotr Ilyich Tchaikovsky, 1970
- Twinkliana, to music by Wolfgang Amadeus Mozart, 1990
- Two Birds with the Wings of One, Bright Sheng, 2006
- The Two Stars, Cesare Pugni, 1871

=== U ===
- The Unanswered Question, to music by Charles Ives, 1988
- Union Jack, to music adapted by Hershy Kay, 1976

=== V ===
- Valley of Shadows, to music by Pyotr Ilyich Tchaikovsky, 1983
- La Valse, to music by Maurice Ravel, 1951
- Valse triste, to music by Jean Sibelius, 1985
- Variations, to music by Igor Stravinsky, 1966
- Variations for Orchestra, to music by Igor Stravinsky, 1982
- The Vertiginous Thrill of Exactitude, to music by Franz Schubert, 1996
- Vespro, Bruno Moretti, 2002
- The Vestal, Mikhail Ivanov, 1888
- Victoria and Merrie England, to music by Arthur Sullivan, 1897
- Vienna Waltzes, to music by Johann Strauss II, Franz Lehár, and Richard Strauss, 1977
- La Vivandière or Markitenka, Cesare Pugni, 1844
- Voices of Spring, to music by Johann Strauss II, 1977

=== W ===
- Walpurgisnacht, to music by Charles Gounod, 1980
- Watermill, to music by Teiji Ito, 1972
- Western Symphony, to American folk tunes, 1954
- West Side Story Suite, to music by Leonard Bernstein, 1995
- Within the Golden Hour, Ezio Bosso and to music by Antonio Vivaldi, 2008
- The Whims of the Butterfly, Nikolai Krotkov, 1889
- Who Cares?, to music by George Gershwin, 1970
- Why am I not where you are, Thierry Escaich, 2010
- Wild Swans, Elena Kats-Chernin, 2003
- Winter Dreams, to music by Pyotr Ilyich Tchaikovsky, 1991
- The Winter's Tale, Joby Talbot, 2014
- The Wise Virgins, to music by Johann Sebastian Bach, 1940
- The Witch, to music by Maurice Ravel, 1950
- The Wooden Prince, Béla Bartók, 1917
- Woodland Sketches, to music by Edward MacDowell, 1988
- Woolf Works, Max Richter, 2015

=== X ===
- X-Ray, to music by John Adams, 1994

=== Y ===
- Year of the Rabbit, to music by Sufjan Stevens, 2012
- Yugen, to music by Leonard Bernstein, 2018

=== Z ===
- Zakouski, to music by Sergei Rachmaninoff, Igor Stravinsky, Sergei Prokofiev, Pyotr Ilyich Tchaikovsky, 1992
- Zenobia, 1936
- Zoraiya, Ludwig Minkus, 1881
- Zorba the ballet, music by Mikis Theodorakis

== See also ==
- List of historical ballet characters
