= Piano-Rag-Music (disambiguation) =

Piano-Rag-Music is a 1919 piano solo by Igor Stravinsky.

Piano-Rag-Music may also refer to:

- Piano-Rag-Music (Bolender) 1972
- Piano-Rag-Music (Martins) 1982
