= Pas de deux (disambiguation) =

Pas de deux is a ballet duet in which steps are performed together.

Pas de deux may also refer to:

== Ballet ==
- Pas de Deux (d'Amboise), a ballet by Christopher d'Amboise
- Pas de Deux (Robbins) or Andantino, a ballet by Jerome Robbins
- Tschaikovsky Pas de Deux, a ballet by George Balanchine

== Other uses ==
- Pas de Deux (band), a Belgian band which represented Belgium in the Eurovision Song Contest 1983
- Pas de deux (dressage), a performance with two horses
- Pas de deux (film), a 1968 film directed by Norman McLaren
- Pas de deux (Horner), a 2014 double concerto by James Horner
- "Pas de Deux" (Law & Order: Criminal Intent), a television episode
- Pas de Deux (solitaire), a card game
