= Veronika Part =

Russian ballet dancer

- Born: 21 February 1978 (age 48); Leningrad, Russian SFSR, Soviet Union
- Occupation: Ballet dancer
- Years active: 1996–present
- Career
- Current group: Atlanta Ballet
- Former groups: Kirov Ballet; American Ballet Theatre
- Dances: Ballet

Veronika Part (born 21 February 1978) is a Russian ballet dancer. She is a former principal dancer with American Ballet Theatre. She served as a ballet mistress for Atlanta Ballet during the 2019–20 season.

== Early life ==
Veronika Part was born in Leningrad (now St. Petersburg). The doctor who delivered her said she had beautiful legs, therefore her mother believed Part should be a ballet dancer. However, Part started in gymnastics at age 4, and continued for six years. In 1988, at age 10, her mother sent her to audition for Vaganova Academy of Russian Ballet. She was accepted and started training at the academy. She graduated in 1996, under the class of Inna Zubkovskaya.

== Career ==
In 1996, at age 18, Part joined the Kirov Ballet (now Mariinsky Ballet), and became a soloist in 1998. At age 20, she made her debut as Odette/Odile in Swan Lake and the title role in Raymonda. She was coached by Gabriella Komleva, Ninel Kurgapkina, Yelena Yevteyeva and Lubov Kunakova. She was the winner of the BALTIKA Prize in 1999. The Kirov toured extensively during this time and Part danced in many different countries on many continents. She became frustrated at her lack of progress and being overlooked for principal even though she was dancing principal roles and began to look around in Europe for the opportunities.

Part first performed in New York City in 1999 with the Mariinsky cast as the Lilac Fairy in The Sleeping Beauty and caught the attention of American Ballet Theatre director Kevin McKenzie. When she returned three years later in the role of Odette/Odile in Swan Lake, McKenzie invited her to join as a soloist with the company, which she accepted. Part spoke no English at the time. She made her debut with ABT during its Japan tour. She first performed supporting roles, but gradually got more prominent roles.

Part considered leaving the ABT and return to Russia, as she wanted to dance more and more support offstage, but was promoted to the rank of principal dancer in 2009. She decided to stay for personal reasons. Since her promotion, she had danced many of lead roles of the company's repertoire, including works by McKenzie, Frederick Ashton, George Balanchine and Alexei Ratmansky. She had created roles for the latter, including Natalia in his On the Dnieper and Lilac Fairy in his version of The Sleeping Beauty.

Outside of ABT, she had appeared on Late Show with David Letterman. She had danced with the Royal New Zealand Ballet as a guest artist. She also participated in projects by the Kennedy Center and Metropolitan Opera. In 2012, she had returned to the Mariinsky as guest to perform in Swan Lake. The following year, she appeared in documentary Ballet's Greatest Hits, dancing the White Swan pas de deux.

In 2017, Part retired from ABT as her contract was not renewed. Her departure was announced days before her final performance. Her fans started a petition on Change.org to ask the company's leadership to let Part stay. Part exited the company following a performance of Balanchine's Mozartiana.

Part had taught in schools across the U.S., and was a jury at Youth America Grand Prix. She later became a ballet master at Atlanta Ballet.

== Selected repertoire ==
=== Kirov ===
- Nikiya in La Bayadère
- The Queen of the Dryads in Don Quixote
- Myrta, Moyna and Zulma in Giselle
- Raymonda and Henrietta in Raymonda
- The Lilac Fairy in The Sleeping Beauty
- Odette-Odile in Swan Lake
- Terpsichore in Apollo
- "Emeralds" and "Diamonds" from Jewels
- Second movement in Symphony in C
- Serenade

=== ABT ===
- Terpsichore in Apollo
- Nikiya in La Bayadère
- Kitri, Mercedes and the Queen of the Driads in Don Quixote
- An Episode in His Past in Jardin aux Lilas
- Mozartiana
- Manon in Lady of the Camellias
- Lescaut’s Mistress in Manon
- Sugar Plum Fairy in The Nutcracker (McKenzie)
- Clara, the Princess The Nutcracker (Ratmansky)
- Other Dances
- Raymonda, Henrietta, the White Lady and the Lead Spanish Dancer in Raymonda
- Princess Aurora and the Lilac Fairy in The Sleeping Beauty
- Odette-Odile and the Polish Princess in Swan Lake
- The Sylph in La Sylphide
- Les Sylphides
- Sylvia and Terpsichore in Sylvia
- Second movement in Symphony in C
- Bach Partita
- Monotones II
- Symphony #9
- The Dying Swan
- Twig in Cinderella
- Prayer in Coppélia
- Odalisque in Le Corsaire
- Lady Capulet in Romeo and Juliet

==== Created roles ====
- Natalia in On the Dnieper (Ratmansky)
- The Lilac Fairy in The Sleeping Beauty (Ratmansky)
- Dumbarton
- Kaleidoscope
- Within You Without You: A Tribute to George Harrison
