= Andantino =

Andantino may refer to:

- Andantino (music), an Italian tempo marking meaning a tempo that is slightly faster than Andante (78–83 BPM)
- Andantino (ballet), a Jerome Robbins ballet
- Andantino (game), a two-player board game
