= List of 1970s ballet premieres =

This is a list of ballet premieres in the 1970s, by year.

== 1972 ==
title	choreographer	composer	company
Duo Concertant	George Balanchine	Igor Stravinsky	New York City Ballet Stravinsky Festival
Ode	Lorca Massine	Igor Stravinsky	New York City Ballet Stravinsky Festival
Piano-Rag-Music	Todd Bolender	Igor Stravinsky	New York City Ballet Stravinsky Festival
Initials R.B.M.E.	John Cranko	Johannes Brahms	Stuttgart Ballet
Scherzo à la Russe	George Balanchine	Igor Stravinsky	New York City Ballet Stravinsky Festival
Stravinsky Violin Concerto	George Balanchine	Igor Stravinsky	New York City Ballet Stravinsky Festival
Symphony in Three Movements	George Balanchine	Igor Stravinsky	New York City Ballet Stravinsky Festival
Watermill	Jerome Robbins	Teiji Ito	New York City Ballet
Symphony in E flat	John Clifford	Igor Stravinsky	New York City Ballet Stravinsky Festival

== 1975 ==
title	choreographer	composer	company
In G Major	Jerome Robbins	Maurice Ravel	New York City Ballet Ravel Festival
Mother Goose	Jerome Robbins	Maurice Ravel	New York City Ballet Ravel Festival
The Merry Widow	Ronald Hynd	Franz Lehár/John Lanchbery	Australian Ballet Company
Sarabande and Danse	Jacques d'Amboise	Claude Debussy	New York City Ballet Ravel Festival
The Steadfast Tin Soldier	George Balanchine	Georges Bizet	New York City Ballet
Le tombeau de Couperin	George Balanchine	Maurice Ravel	New York City Ballet Ravel Festival
