= List of 1960s ballet premieres =

This is a list of ballet premieres in the 1960s, by year.

== 1960 ==
title	choreographer	composer	company	venue or presentation	date	Notes
La fille mal gardée	Frederick Ashton	Peter Ludwig Hertel, Ferdinand Hérold, John Lanchbery	The Royal Ballet	Royal Opera House	January 28	
Tschaikovsky Pas de Deux	George Balanchine	Peter Ilyitch Tschaikovsky	New York City Ballet	City Center of Music and Drama	March 29	
The Invitation	Kenneth MacMillan	Mátyás Seiber	The Royal Ballet	New Theatre Oxford	November 10	
Monumentum pro Gesualdo	George Balanchine	Igor Stravinsky	New York City Ballet	City Center of Music and Drama	November 16	
Liebeslieder Walzer	George Balanchine	Johannes Brahms	New York City Ballet	City Center of Music and Drama	November 22	

== 1966 ==
Title	Choreographer	Composer	Company	Venue
Brahms–Schoenberg Quartet	George Balanchine	Schoenbergorchestration of Brahms	New York City Ballet	New York State Theater
La guirlande de Campra	John Taras	Honegger, Daniel-Lesur, Roland-Manuel, Tailleferre, Poulenc, Sauguet, Auric	New York City Ballet	New York State Theater
Narkissos	Edward Villella	Robert Prince	New York City Ballet	Saratoga Performing Arts Center
Requiem Canticles	Jerome Robbins	Igor Stravinsky	New York City Ballet	New York State Theater
Variations	George Balanchine	Igor Stravinsky	New York City Ballet	New York State Theater
Concerto	Kenneth MacMillan	Dmitri Shostakovich	The Royal Ballet	Deutsche Oper Berlin
