= List of 1940s ballet premieres =

This is a list of ballet premieres in the 1940s, by year.

== 1944 ==
title	choreographer	composer	company	venue or presentation	date
Appalachian Spring	Martha Graham	Aaron Copland	Martha Graham Dance Company	Library of Congress	October 30
Fancy Free	Jerome Robbins	Leonard Bernstein	Ballet Theatre	Old Metropolitan Opera House	April 18
Hérodiade	Martha Graham	Paul Hindemith		Elizabeth Sprague Coolidge Auditorium	October 30
Miracle in the Gorbals	Robert Helpmann	Arthur Bliss	Sadler's Wells Ballet	Prince's Theatre, London	October 26
The Nutcracker	Willam Christensen	Pyotr Ilyich Tchaikovsky	San Francisco Ballet		December 24
Simple Symphony	Walter Gore	Benjamin Britten	Rambert Dance Company		
The Stone Flower	Konstantin Muller	Alexander Fridlender			

== 1945 ==
title	choreographer	composer	company	venue or presentation	date	refs
Cinderella	Rostislav Zakharov	Sergei Prokofiev	Bolshoi Ballet	Bolshoi Theatre	November 21	
Interplay	Jerome Robbins	Morton Gould	Billy Rose's Concert Varieties	Ziegfeld Theatre	June 1	
