= List of 2010s ballet premieres =

This is a list of ballet premieres in the 2010s, by year.

== 2010 ==
title	choreographer	composer	company	venue	date
Why am I not where you are	Benjamin Millepied	Thierry Escaich	New York City Ballet	David H. Koch Theater	Thursday, 29 April
Outlier	Wayne McGregor	Thomas Adès	New York City Ballet	David H. Koch Theater	Saturday, 14 May
Plainspoken	Benjamin Millepied	David Lang	New York City Ballet	Center for the Arts, Jackson Hole	Friday, 6 August

== 2011 ==
title	choreographer	composer	company	venue	date
RAkU	Yuri Possokhov	Shinji Eshima	San Francisco Ballet	War Memorial Opera House	3 February
Alice's Adventures in Wonderland	Christopher Wheeldon	Joby Talbot	Royal Ballet	Royal Opera House	28 February
Ocean's Kingdom	Peter Martins	Paul McCartney	New York City Ballet	David H. Koch Theater	22 September
Tom Sawyer: A Ballet in Three Acts	William Whitener	Maury Yeston	Kansas City Ballet	Kauffman Center for the Performing Arts	14 October

== 2013 ==
title	choreographer	composer	company	venue	date
The Sun Also Rises	Septime Webre	Billy Novick	The Washington Ballet	The Kennedy Center	8 May

== 2014 ==
title	choreographer	composer	company	venue	date
Dust	Akram Khan	Jocelyn Pook	English National Ballet	Barbican Centre	2 April
The Winter's Tale	Christopher Wheeldon	Joby Talbot	Royal Ballet	Royal Opera House	10 April
Everywhere We Go	Justin Peck	Sufjan Stevens	New York City Ballet	David H. Koch Theater	8 May
Pictures at an Exhibition	Alexei Ratmansky	Modest Mussorgsky	New York City Ballet	David H. Koch Theater	2 October

== 2015 ==
title	choreographer	composer	company	venue	date	Refs
Rodeo: Four Dance Episodes	Justin Peck	Aaron Copland	New York City Ballet	David H. Koch Theater	4 February	
Charlotte Salomon: Der Tod und die Malerin	Bridget Breiner	Michelle DiBucci	Ballet im Revier	Musiktheater im Revier	14 February	
Swimmer	Yuri Possokhov	Shinji Eshima	San Francisco Ballet	War Memorial Opera House	10 April	
Woolf Works	Wayne McGregor	Max Richter	The Royal Ballet	Royal Opera House	11 May	

== 2016 ==
title	choreographer	composer	company	venue	date
Blake Works I	William Forsythe	James Blake	Paris Opera Ballet	Palais Garnier	4 July
Broken Wings	Annabelle Lopez Ochoa	Peter Salem	English National Ballet	Sadler's Wells Theatre	13 April
In the Countenance of Kings	Justin Peck	Sufjan Stevens	San Francisco Ballet	War Memorial Opera House	7 April
RIFT	Kitty McNamee	Anna Clyne	Cabrillo Festival of Contemporary Music	Santa Cruz Civic Auditorium	5 August
The Red Shoes	Matthew Bourne	Bernard Herrmann	New Adventures	Sadler's Wells Theatre	6 December
The Seasons' Canon	Crystal Pite	Max Richter and Antonio Vivaldi	Paris Opera Ballet	Palais Garnier	24 September
