= The Beauty of Lebanon or The Mountain Spirit =

1863 ballet by Marius Petipa

The Beauty of Lebanon, or The Mountain Spirit (French: La Belle du Liban, ou L'Esprit des montagnes; Russian: Ливанская красавица, или Горный дух) is a fantastic ballet in three acts and seven scenes, with choreography by Marius Petipa and music by Cesare Pugni. Libretto by E. Rappoport and Marius Petipa. The ballet was first presented by the Imperial Ballet on December 12/24 (Julian/Gregorian calendar dates), 1863 at the Imperial Bolshoi Kamenny Theatre in St. Petersburg, Russia, with Mariia Surovshchikova-Petipa (as the Mountain Spirit) and Timofei Stukolkin (as Beshir).

== See also ==
- List of ballets by title
