= Nénuphar =

1890 ballet by Marius Petipa

Nénuphar (The Water Lily) is a ballet fantastique in one act, with choreography by Marius Petipa and music by Nikolaï Krotkov (1849–19..). First presented by the Imperial Ballet on November 11/23 (Julian/Gregorian calendar dates), 1890 at the Imperial Mariinsky Theatre in St. Petersburg, Russia. Principal dancers: Carlotta Brianza

== See also ==
- List of ballets by title
