= Pâquerette =

Ballet in three acts

Pâquerette is a ballet in three acts, with choreography by Arthur Saint-Léon and music by François Benoist.

The ballet was first presented by the Ballet of the Académie Royale de Musique on January 15, 1851, in Paris, France, with Fanny Cerrito as Pâquerette and Arthur Saint-Léon as François.

== Revivals/Restagings ==
- Restaging by Arthur Saint-Léon for the Imperial Ballet, with Cesare Pugni making additions and revising Benoist's score. First presented on January 28/February 9 (Julian/Gregorian calendar dates), 1860 at the Imperial Bolshoi Kamenny Theatre, in St. Petersburg, Russia.
- Revival by Marius Petipa for the Imperial Ballet, with Léon Minkus making additions and revising Benoist's score. First presented on January 10–22, 1882 at the Imperial Bolshoi Kamenny Theatre, in St. Petersburg, Russia. Eugenia Sokolova (as Pâquerette), and Pavel Gerdt (as François).
- In 2012, an hourlong duet titled Pâquerette was performed at the Invisible Dog Art Center as part of the Queer New York Festival with two nude performers.

== See also ==
- List of ballets by title
