= Lali Kandelaki =

- Born: ლალი კანდელაკი Lali Kandelaki; September 9, 1972 (age 53); Tbilisi, GSSR
- Occupation: Ballet dancer
- Years active: 1997-present
- Career
- Current group: State Ballet of Georgia
- Dances: Tbilisi, Georgia

Lali Kandelaki (Georgian: ლალი კანდელაკი; born September 9, 1972) is a Georgian ballerina with the State Ballet of Georgia.

== Biography ==
Kandelaki was born in Tbilisi, Georgia, and trained under Vakhtang Chabukiani, Nina Didebulidze and Margarita Grishkevich. She debuted in Sergei Prokofiev's Cinderella at the Tbilisi's Z. Paliashvili Opera and Ballet Professional State Theatre, where her repertoire included Odette-Odile in Swan Lake, Gamzatti in La Bayadere, Javara in Gorda, and Kitri in Don Quixote. Kandelaki appeared in George Aleksidze's Symphonic Dances at the 1997 Edinburgh International Festival.

She became principal dancer of Turkey's Mersin Opera and Ballet Theatre in 1997. Until 2003 she played lead roles in N. Maghalashvili's stagings of Carmen, Porgy and Bess, Giselle, Le Corasaire (Medora), One thousand and one nights, and Romeo and Juliette.

She has been a prima ballerina at the Z. Paliashvili State Theatre since 2003, and was company manager between 2011 and 2013.

In 2008 she toured with the Royal Swedish Ballet in China, where her performance as Odette-Odile from Swan Lake reportedly included 32 double fouettés.

== Awards ==
- 2009: Georgian Order of Honor in 2009
- 2000: Gold and first prize at the Varna International Ballet Competition
- Vakhtang Chabukiani Medal
