= Gorda (ballet) =

Gorda is two-act ballet by the Georgian composer David Toradze, first premiered in 1949 at the Georgian National Opera and Ballet Theater. Originally performed by prominent Georgian ballet dancers Vakhtang Chabukiani and Vera Tsignadze, Gorda was revived in 2016 by Nina Ananiashvili.

== History ==
Gorda originally premiered on 30 December 1949, at the Georgian National Opera and Ballet Theater. A "Public Hearing" (the heading instead of "premiere") was attended by artists, musicians and choreographers; Vakhtang Chabukiani’s new performance was positively appraised and 30 December eventually became Gorda premiere day.

Otar Egadze and Vakhtang Chabukiani worked on the ballet libretto, based on Daniel Chonkadze’s tale of "Surami Fortress". According to libretto, ballet was named Dardia, but the staging team decided to change the name and make more emphasis on the name of young sculptor. Eventually, the ballet was titled after the main character – Gorda.

By then, Vakhtang Chabukiani was already an acclaimed dancer and choreographer who worked on new ballets after his arrival to Tbilisi. Andria Balanchivadze's Heart of Mountains and Grigol Kiladze's Light were staged. It was clear that he aimed at staging ballets based on Georgian motifs, as he was persistent with the classical heritage.

Production design of the performance was by young Pharnaoz Lapiashvili; the conductor was Didim Mirtskhulava. Gorda's main part was performed by Vakhtang Chabukiani, Javara by Vera Tsignadze, Irema – IrineAleksidze, Mamia- Zurab Kikaleishvili. While first staging of ballet, Tamar Chabukiani's (Alalme), Maria Bauer's (Indian Dance) and Maria Grishkevich's (NegrosDance) performances were outstanding.

In 1951, the ballet received a USSR award and in 1957 a new choreographic version premiered (Gorda – Zurab Kikaleishvili, Irema- Vera Tsignadze, Javara - Liliana Mitaishvili, Mamaia – Revaz Magalashvili).

In 1973, a fire destroyed the entire repertoire of scenery and costumes. Several performances required restaging, including Gorda. In 1974, one more premiere was presented at Labor Union Culture Palace. This place eventually became haven for artists abandoned without a theater.

In 1985 new choreographic version of Gorda was staged at Tbilisi Opera and Ballet Theater. Production design was by Ivane Askurava, conductor was Revaz Takidze; leading parts were performed by Zakaria Amonashvli and Nukri Magalashvili (Gorda), Ala Abesadze and Victoria Laperashvili (Irema), Lia Bakhtadze (Javara).

ZurabKikaleshvili was the last to restage Gorda in 1996. Leading parts were performed by theater soloists Vasil Akhmeteli (Gorda), Yuri Sorokin (Mamia), Lia Bakhtadze (Javara), Ketevan Mukhashavria (Irema). The last performance of this version was in 2002.

Since 2004, Nina Ananiashvili is artistic director of the theater. After appointment, she made important decision for Georgian ballet and theater- to restore Vakhtang Chabukiani's artistic heritage. The first performance staged was A. Krein's Laurencia (choreographic version by Nukri Magalashvili. 2007). Nina Ananiashvili staged her own choreographic version of Laurencia at Minsk Opera and Ballet State Academic Theater (2014). The following step was Gorda. New libretto versions and ballet choreographic version were created by Nina, who herself led ballet restaging works. Creative team worked on Gorda's production - Liliana Mitaishvili and Lali Kandelaki, Ekaterine Shavliashvili (assistant to the choreographer), Revaz Takidze (conductor), David Monavardisashvili (production design), Ana Kalatozishvili (costume designer), Jesper Keningsboro (production design), Studio "Opio" (video animations).

Leading parts were performed by theater soloists Lali Kandelaki, Nino Samadashvili, Nutsa Chekurashvili, Ekaterine Surmava, David Ananiashvili, Yonen Takanoand Frank van Tongeren.

In 67 years, David Toradze's Gorda is back to modernized, restored Tbilisi Opera and Ballet Theater stage. It is first ballet premiere at renovated stage. The most recent Gorda premiere was held on 12 February 2016.

== Synopsis ==
=== Act one ===
Young sculptor Gorda carves into the rock image of the secretly beloved princess. Girls are running in, noblewoman Javara among them, insanely in love with Gorda. She is certain that sculptor creates a portrait of her.

Sound of the horn: the king and his daughter Irema are hunting. Princess is gloomy as eagle caught her best falcon. None of the royal retinue could manage to free predator. Only Gorda succeeded. Irema catches a sight of her image at the rock. Princess falls in love at first sight with young man and presents him rescued falcon.

Nobleman Mamia is in love with Irema and envies the success of rival. The king, admired with the agility of a young man invites participants of the hunt to royal palace.

Javara who witnessed Gorda and Irema's meeting, gets suspicious, and recognizes princess in Gorda's sculpture. Desperate Javara declares her love to Gorda. In a state of jealousy Javara kills falcon presented by Irema. Indignant Gorda leaves. Life has lost its meaning for her. She is only driven by power of revenge. Javara raises the murdered eagle and takes arrow out of its chest. She vows revenge for her rejected love.

Feast takes place at royal palace, where Gorda is present as well. Confrontation between Gorda and Mamia is vivid in their dance. Irema stands in the middle and sets them apart. Feast is interrupted by the appearance of the Eastern ambassadors. Khalif requires marrying the only daughter of the king - Irema. Enraged king sends refusal letter to Khalif.

The best shooter- Gorda must take the king's response to the eastern masters. Irema in sadness sees off Gorda in a dangerous journey and presents her amulet.

=== Act two ===
Fest at Khalif's palace. He is looking forward to getting news from Georgia. Georgian ambassadors are escorted to palace. Gorda delivers king's rejection. Furious Khalif, orders to behead the ambassadors. In an unequal battle Georgians get killed. The only left alive is Gorda, who kills Khalif and dives into the sea.

After tough and exhausting path, Gorda notices familiar monastery and realizes he is at homeland.

Time has passed. Gorda and Irema live happily together with their son-Badri. But suddenly they are informed about sad news-it is the third time that fortress is crumbling, which serves the only bulwark against the invasion of foreign intruders. The king sends Gorda and Mamia to renowned prophetess for an advice.

Oracle turns out to be Javara who recognizes the loved one. Javara is delighted as the revenge has come. She gives Mamia an arrow (which struck eagle). "The only way to build indestructible fortress is to immure son of the owner of the arrow in the wall" – says the oracle. Mamia leaves, Javara stops Gorda, who did not recognize her, and reminds about herself.

King commands to examine the arrow. Arrow turns out to belong to Gorda. Badri's parents are in despair.

Meanwhile, intruders invaded the country. Gorda leaves for battle. People demand conformation with Javara's prophecy. Javara grabs away son from Irema and heads to fortress to immure him.

Gorda hits an enemy commander. Defeated enemy gives up. Gorda's bravery delivers homeland from danger and rescues Badri from death sentence.
