= Stars and Stripes (ballet) =

Ballet by George Balanchine

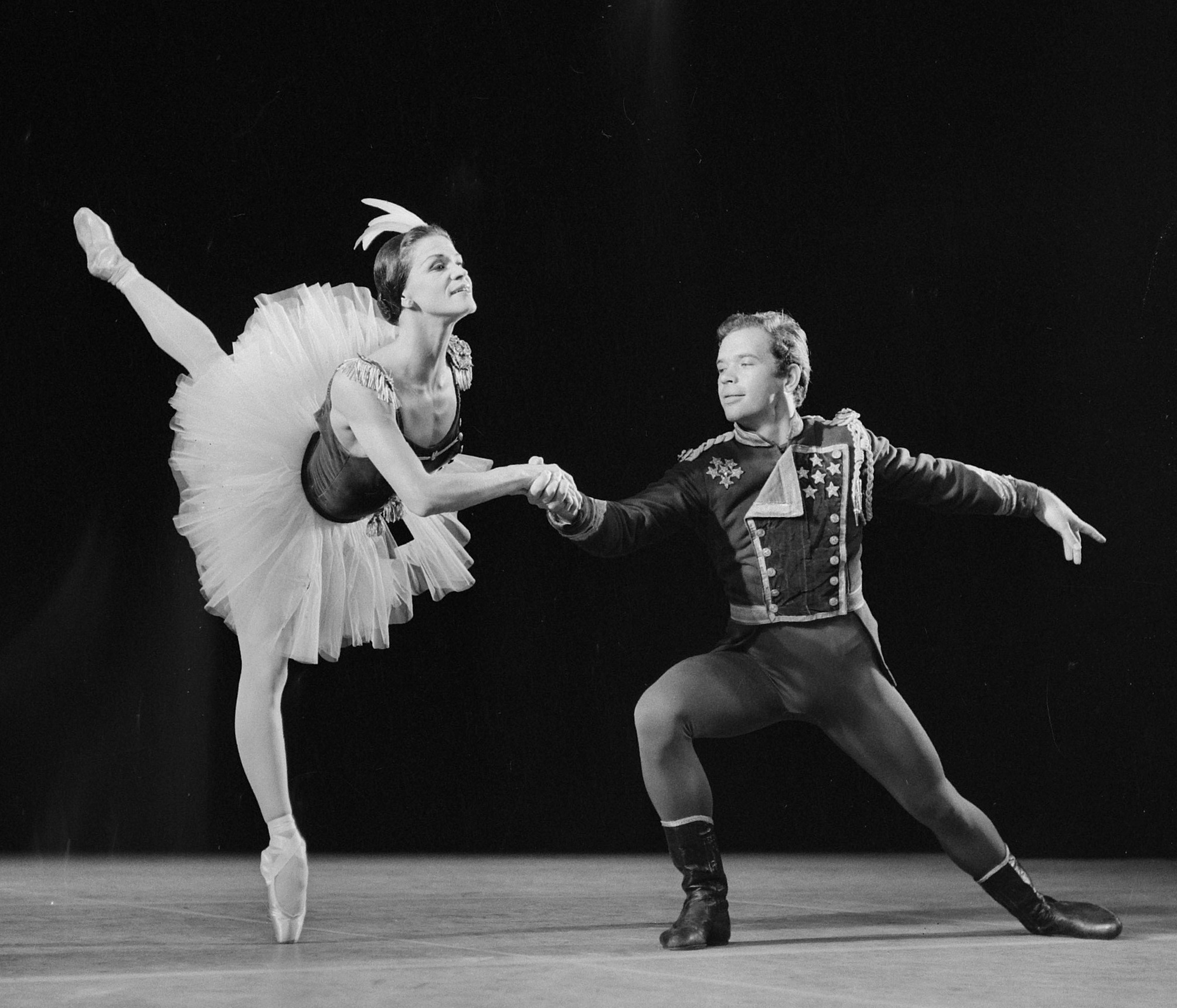
- Melissa Hayden and Andre Prokovsky in Stars and Stripes
- Choreographer: George Balanchine
- Music: John Philip Sousa; Hershy Kay
- Premiere: January 17, 1958; City Center of Music and Drama
- Original ballet company: New York City Ballet
- Design: Karinska; David Hays
- Genre: neoclassical ballet

Stars and Stripes is a neoclassical ballet choreographed by George Balanchine to music by John Philip Sousa, orchestrated by Hershy Kay. The ballet was made as a tribute to the United States, Balanchine's adopted country. It premiered on January 17, 1958, at the City Center of Music and Drama, danced by the New York City Ballet. It is dedicated to Fiorello La Guardia, former mayor of New York City. The ballet had been revived by multiple ballet companies, and at different special occasions.

== Background and production ==
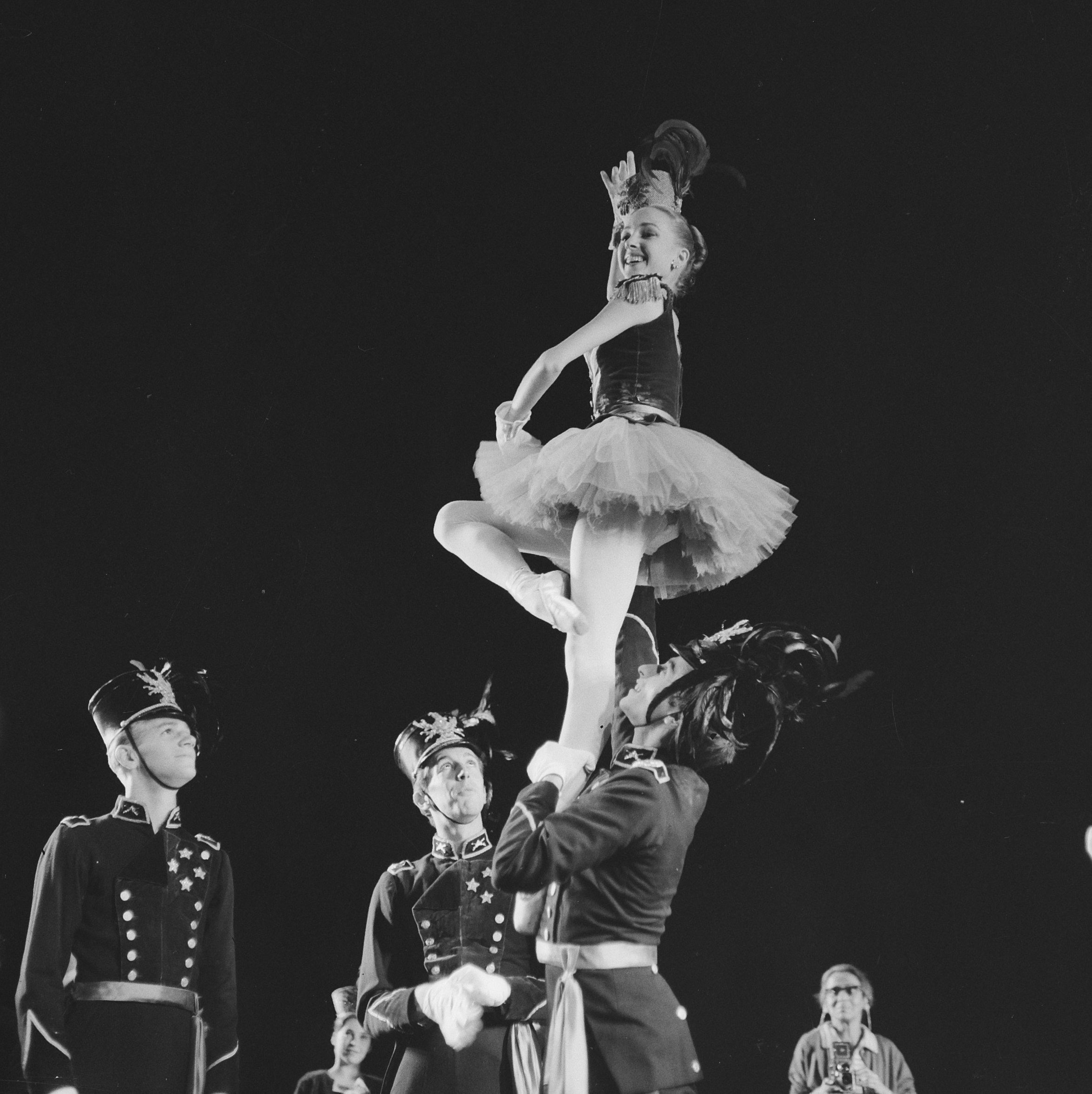
Suki Schorer and New York City Ballet dancers in Stars and Stripes

Choreographer and New York City Ballet co-founder George Balanchine, who was raised in Imperial Russia and worked in Europe during his early career, moved to the United States in 1933 and became an American citizen in 1940. He later conceived the idea of Stars and Stripes, as a tribute to his adopted country.

Balanchine chose to use music by John Philip Sousa, who was best known for writing military marches. When asked about the unusual choice of music, Balanchine only responded, "I like Sousa's music. It makes me feel good." Lincoln Kirstein, co-founder of the New York City Ballet, wrote, "The ballet was conceived as a musical joke, Stars and Stripes was generally received as such, then and since." Apart from Sousa's martial marches, the music of Stars and Stripes also included an opera and other lesser known pieces. Hershy Kay, who had previously orchestrated music for ballet Western Symphony, was brought in to orchestrate Sousa's music, which was written for brass instruments only.

The costumes and sets were designed by Karinska and David Hays respectively. The sets include a black backdrop, rather than blue, which is used in many of Balanchine's works. Another backdrop used is a large flag of the United States. The ballet is dedicated to Fiorello La Guardia, former mayor of New York City.

== Choreography ==
Stars and Stripes has five sections, each called a "campaign". Once, Balanchine was asked whether Stars and Stripes has a story. He said yes, and when asked what is the story, he replied, "The United States". Balanchine called the ballet a "balletic parade", with four groups called "regiments". He also admitted Stars and Stripes is what he called "the applause machine", and noted "calculated vulgarity is a useful ingredient". In total, the ballet is danced by 27 women and 14 men. Sandra Jennings from the Balanchine Trust noted the ballet is "difficult" for the corps de ballet. On the whole ballet, dance critic John Martin commented, "With the spirit of Sousa in the pit, the military march inevitably takes over the doings on stage, We see it in virtually every variety – drilling, parade strutting, drum-majoretting. There are high kicks galore, 'heel stretches,' tricks out of the circus and lifts… Everybody salutes at the slightest provocation."

The first campaign, set to "Corcoran Cadets", starts with twelve women on stage. Their leader then enters with a majorette baton and marches, a moment dance critic John Gruen called "the image of the all-American girl". The women march while the leader performs different steps. The section ends with the corps de ballet marching towards the audience then offstage, followed by the leader.

The second campaign, to "Rifle Regiments", is danced by a female corps de ballet and a leader. Taller dancers are cast in this section. Therefore, as Gruen wrote, "Their jolly marching and intricate patterns have a more broadly sweeping character."

The third campaign is set to "Thunder and Gladiator", and performed by an all-male group. Dance critic Jennifer Dunning wrote, "men's flying stage-crosses, giving the tumultuous stage a fixed center in the regiment's spinning leader." At the end of the section, the dancers salute the audience. Jennings said that everyone in this section has "to be like a soloist" and "able to do the kind of steps that are asked of a soloist."

The fourth campaign, to "The Liberty Bell" and "El Capitan", is a pas de deux that was described as "showy" by author Robert Greskovic, and follows the structure of a classical pas de deux. Martin wrote that this section "goes for virtually impossible bravura". Kirstein wrote that Balanchine created the pas de deux as "a tribute to Dwight Eisenhower, in his senior year at West Point, engaged to Mamie Doud." Balanchine had specifically asked Hershay Kay to use brass instruments in this section, rather than the violin.

The fifth campaign, set to "The Stars and Stripes Forever", starts with dancers from the first two regiments returning to the stage one by one, joined by the third regiment, before the dancers from the fourth campaign enter. Gruen described, "Patriotic fervor overtakes everyone, and as the regiments parade, the leading couple stand at opposite sides of the stage to review them." The backdrop is switched to a large American flag. The ballet ends with the ballerina of the fourth campaign lifted by her partner, and with the full cast, "forms a victoriously patriotic tableau".

== Original cast ==
The principal dancers at the premiere of Stars and Stripes were:

- Allegra Kent
- Diana Adams
- Melissa Hayden
- Robert Barnett
- Jacques d'Amboise

== Performances ==
Stars and Stripes premiered on January 17, 1958, at the City Center of Music and Drama. In 1976, Stars and Stripes was placed in the New York City Ballet program Entente Cordiale, along with Union Jack, Balanchine's homage to the United Kingdom, and Tricolore, a tribute to France that was conceived by Balanchine and choreographed by Jerome Robbins, Peter Martins and Jean-Pierre Bonnefoux.

Stars and Stripes was performed at special occasions, including Nelson Rockefeller's inauguration as Governor of New York. In 1964, the New York City Ballet performed Stars and Stripes at the opening of the New York State Theater. In 1981, following the end of the Iran hostage crisis, Balanchine had the New York City Ballet to perform the finale of Stars and Stripes as a surprise encore at the New York State Theater, with the dancers wearing yellow ribbons. In 1984, the Dance Theatre of Harlem performed the finale of Stars and Stripes at the Olympics closing ceremony in Los Angeles.

Other ballet companies that have performed Stars and Stripes include the American Ballet Theatre, San Francisco Ballet, the Pacific Northwest Ballet, The Washington Ballet, Miami City Ballet, Suzanne Farrell Ballet, Dance Theatre of Harlem. BalletMet, Sarasota Ballet, Sacramento Ballet, Ballet San Jose and City Ballet of San Diego. The School of American Ballet, the affiliated school of the New York City Ballet, had also performed the ballet. According to a 2013 report from The Washington Post, Stars and Stripes is performed less often in recent years due to the number of dancers in the ballet and the techniques required from the corps de ballet.

== Videography ==
In 1993, the fourth and fifth "campaigns" of Stars and Stripes was filmed for the broadcast "The Balanchine Celebration", featuring dancers Margaret Tracey, Damian Woetzel, Katrina Killian and Gen Horiuchi.

== In popular culture ==
In 1996, Robert La Fosse made a parody of Stars and Stripes titled Stars & Stripes Forever for Les Ballets Trockadero de Monte Carlo, an all-male drag ballet troupe.

In 2000, an excerpt of Stars and Stripes was featured in the film Center Stage, danced by Julie Kent and Ethan Stiefel.
