= Watermill (ballet) =

Watermill is a ballet choreographed by Jerome Robbins when he was balletmaster at the New York City Ballet and set to a musical piece written a year earlier by Teiji Ito (also entitled “Watermill”), with costumes by Patricia Zipprodt, lighting by Jennifer Tipton and décor by Robbins in association with Davie Reppa. The ballet premiered on Thursday, February 3, 1972, at the New York State Theater, Lincoln Center.

== Original cast ==
- Penny Dudleston
- Tracy Bennett
- Deni Lamont
- Colleen Neary
- Edward Villella
- Hermes Conde
- Jean-Pierre Frohlich
- Bart Cook
- Victor Castelli
- Robert Maiorano
