= Radio and Juliet =

Ballet

Radio and Juliet is an hour long ballet setup in 2005 for the Slovenian company Ballet Maribor in Slovenia. It was directed by Romanian dancer and choreographer Edward Clug. The ballet is a rendition of William Shakespeare's Romeo and Juliet set to the music of Radiohead, from their albums OK Computer and Kid A. Since 2005 Radio and Juliet has guested in the Netherlands, Italy, Singapore, Korea, Israel, Canada, United States, Russia, Ukraine, Brazil, Serbia and Croatia. It has also been set on the companies of Bucharest National Theater and Kyiv National Opera. On 15 September 2012, the 100th performance was celebrated on the old stage of the Maribor Opera house. The ballet premiered in the United States in 2008 at the Pittsburgh International Festival of Firsts at the Byham Theater. The last performance has been in Limassol in February 2026, the next is in Dortmund in May 2026.

Noted for the ballet's choreography and simplicity, Radio and Juliet represents a modernized interpretation of Shakespeare. As stated by Edward Clug, "You could call this quite a twisted version... My intention was not to retell the story but offer the audience an experience from a different perspective."

== Modernized Shakespeare ==
The scenes and structure of the ballet do not match the original Romeo and Juliet written by Shakespeare. However, the conflict between the Capulets and Montagues and the masquerade ball scenes are included. The ballet begins with Juliet waking up from her deathlike coma to Romeo being gone and continues through her flashbacks. The ballet also uses video effects that zoom in on specific body parts of the cast during their performance. Every scene is a recanted memory of Juliet's. The play focuses on Juliet's perspective rather than the original storyline of the conflict between families. Juliet also does not take her own life like in the original play, as Edward Clug wanted to show her perspective after choosing to live rather than kill herself once she discovers Romeo dead; instead of Romeo drinking poison after thinking Juliet has killed herself, he eats a lemon.

== Major cast ==
- Bojana Nenadovic Otrin (cast on Premiere) and Tijuana Krizman-Hudernik as Juliet
- Eugen Dobrescu (cast on Premiere) and Matjaz Marin as Romeo
- Christian Guerematchi/Edward Clug as Mercutio

There are four other male dancers. The outfits worn by the cast are simple, the men wear suits without shirts and Juliet wears a corset. During the masquerade ball scene, the men wear surgical masks.

== Music ==
The entire score of the ballet are songs performed by the British rock band Radiohead. Most of the music is taken from albums OK Computer and Kid A. The robotic voice from the album OK Computer matches the robotic choreography and is used for a solo by Juliet. The ballet uses 11 Radiohead songs including "Fitter Happier," "Bullet Proof... (I Wish I Was)," "Idioteque," "How to Disappear Completely", and "Like Spinning Plates."

The songs are used to create an atmosphere. The lyrics sometimes match the scene that is taking place like "Bullet Proof... (I Wish I Was)" during Mercutio's death scene. The song lyrics reinforce the fundamental element of the love story, struggling with relationships, however, the music is more important to the story as Edward Clug says, "There are moments when the story meets the lyrics, but that was not really the point. It's the overall emotion they create in their music."

The ballet includes the song "Exit Music (For a Film)" from the album OK Computer which was originally created for the 1996 film Romeo + Juliet starring Leonardo DiCaprio and Claire Danes. The song appeared in the closing credits of the film but not on the soundtrack recording.

=== Choreography ===
The choreography is made up of sharp body movements. This is supposed to symbolize that love and romance have been affected by "the cold hand of mechanization." Common movements include the arching of the torso, the bending of the wrists paired with elbow motions, and stabbing motions of the feet and legs. The choreography includes twitching and jerking motions which give the appearance of robots on stage.

The scenes are structured in a way so that the characters move in a series of steps. First, they begin with head movements, then the body lifts, then the characters weave in and out one another where pairing and partnered dancing takes place. Twitching continues throughout the dance. When Mercutio dies, the last thing he does is twitch. This is the same for the final scene of the dance, Juliet executes slight head twitches over Romeo's dead body.

== See also ==
- List of ballets by title
