= Les Rendezvous =

Les Rendezvous is a plotless one-act ballet created in 1933, with choreography by Frederick Ashton to the music of Daniel Auber (the ballet music from his opera L'enfant prodigue) arranged by Constant Lambert and with designs by William Chappell. It was the first major ballet created by Ashton for the Vic-Wells company.

It was first performed on Tuesday, 5 December 1933 by Vic-Wells Ballet at Sadler's Wells Theatre, with Alicia Markova and Stanislas Idzikowski in the lead roles; these were later taken by Margot Fonteyn and Robert Helpmann. The choreography was revised in 1934 and the work was performed every season up to 1945, then from 1959 to 1963, when it used the set by Sophie Fedorovitch for Act 1 of La Traviata. It was revived in 1984 by Sadler's Wells Royal Ballet to celebrate Ashton's 80th birthday, and by the Royal Ballet at Covent Garden in 2000 with updated sets. The ballet has also been produced by companies in Norway, the US and Japan.

It was filmed for television in 1962 with Doreen Wells, Brian Shaw, and Merle Park, Petrus Brosnan and Graham Usher in the pas de trois.

Les Rendezvous was Ashton's "first substantial classical composition and an exultant statement of his idiosyncratic approach to academic ballet." It consists of a succession of light-hearted dances in a park, where friends meet and socialise. The ballet was designed to show off the brilliance and style of Markova and the elevation and technical skill of Idzikowsky.

Order of numbers:

1. Entrée des Promeneurs (company)
2. Pas de quatre: (four girls)
3. Male Variation
4. Adage des Amoureux (two leads)
5. Pas de trois (girl and two boys)
6. Female Variation
7. Pas de six: (six boys)
8. Sortie des Promeneurs (company)

The Sadler's Well Orchestra, conducted by Charles Mackerras made a recording of the music in July 1950 at Abbey Road Studios, but due to the standard of playing it was not published. An LP 'A Silver Jubilee Tribute to Sadler's Wells Ballet' included short extracts with the Royal Opera House Orchestra conducted by Robert Irving. In June 1988 the ballet was recorded by the English Concert Orchestra conducted by Richard Bonynge and issued in 1990 as part of a 'Ballet Gala' on a two-disc set by Decca.
