= Swan Lake (Balanchine) =

Ballet by George Balanchine

Swan Lake is a one-act ballet made by New York City Ballet's co-founder and ballet master George Balanchine to Tschaikovsky's eponymous music (1875–56). The premiere took place Thursday, 20 November 1951 at the City Center of Music and Drama, New York.

== Original cast ==
- Maria Tallchief
- Patricia Wilde
- André Eglevsky
- Frank Hobi
- Edward Bigelow
