= Merle Park =

British ballet dancer and teacher

Dame Merle Park DBE
- Born: 8 October 1937 (age 89); Salisbury, Southern Rhodesia (now Harare, Zimbabwe)
- Occupation: Ballet dancer

Dame Merle Park, DBE (born 8 October 1937) is a British ballet dancer and teacher, now retired. As a prima ballerina with the Royal Ballet during the 1960s and 1970s, she was known for "brilliance of execution and virtuoso technique" as well as for her ebullience and charm. Also admired for her dramatic abilities, she was praised as an actress who "textured her vivacity with emotional details."

== Early life and training ==
Born in Salisbury, the capital and most populous city of the self-governing British Crown colony of Southern Rhodesia (now Harare, Zimbabwe), Merle Park was educated in local schools. As a child she began her dance training with Betty Lamb, a local ballet teacher, and soon showed unusual facility.

In 1951, when she was 14, her parents moved the family to England and enrolled her in the Elmhurst Ballet School. Located in Edgbaston, Birmingham, Elmhurst is an independent vocational school for youngsters intent on pursuing a professional career in classical ballet. During her three years there, Park proved to be an outstanding student. She transferred to the Sadler's Wells Ballet School in London in 1954, and, after only six months of study, was taken into the corps de ballet of the Sadler's Wells Ballet company, soon to be granted a royal charter and renamed The Royal Ballet.

== Professional career ==
Park made her stage debut as a rat in the retinue of the wicked fairy Carabosse in The Sleeping Beauty, the ballet staged by Ninette de Valois for the reopening of the Royal Opera House in 1946, a year after the end of World War II in Europe. From 1955 onward, while still a member of the corps, she was assigned numerous solo roles.

At the age of 19, she danced the role of the carefree Milkmaid in Frederick Ashton's popular Façade in the opera house's Silver Jubilee gala on 6 May 1956. Soon thereafter, she was noticed by critics in a sparkling performance of Princess Florine, opposite the Bluebird in act 3 of The Sleeping Beauty. Promoted to soloist in 1958, she danced her first Swanhilde, the saucy village lass in Coppélia, and the title character in John Cranko's Pineapple Poll, set to the merry tunes of Arthur Sullivan. She had notable success in both parts, as "her small, light frame and fleet, sunny style made her a natural soubrette."

Named a principal dancer in 1962, she subsequently danced all the ballerina roles in the classical repertory. In 1968, she was cast as Clara in Rudolf Nureyev's production of The Nutcracker, dancing with him in the lyrical duet in act 1 and in the spectacular pas de deux that is the climax of act 2. It proved to be the role that made her a star. She was greatly admired as Giselle, as Cinderella, and, particularly, as Aurora in The Sleeping Beauty. She gave more performances of Giselle than any other artiste in the history of the company. In 1973, she danced the dual role of Odette/Odile in Swan Lake for the first of many acclaimed performances.

In the ballets of Frederick Ashton, she shone as Lise in La Fille mal gardée and as Titania in The Dream. Ashton's Symphonic Variations, a plotless work set to the score by César Franck, provided her opportunity to display her musicality and classical precision, as did the role of the Indian temple dancer Nikiya in La Bayadère. In contrast, her impersonation of Kate in Cranko's wildly funny The Taming of the Shrew, set to music by Domenico Scarlatti, sparkled with roguish humor. She also gave highly dramatic performances in the title roles of Kenneth MacMillan's Romeo and Juliet and Manon, set to scores by Serge Prokofiev and Jules Massenet, respectively. Photographs of her in these roles reveal a talented dance actress at work.

Park toured widely on the international ballet circuit with the Royal Ballet, often dancing with such dynamic partners as Nureyev, Anthony Dowell, and Mikhail Baryshnikov. In 1970, she toured the major cities of Rhodesia, her home country, with Royal Ballet principal dancer Petrus Bosman, a native South African, as her partner. Capping her multifaceted career was the role of the Countess Marie Larisch in MacMillan's Mayerling (1978), which depicts the final years of Crown Prince Rudolf of Austria-Hungary. As a lady in waiting to Empress Elizabeth and a former mistress of the prince, played by David Wall, she scored a theatrical triumph.

Of all the ballets in which Park appeared in her later years, however, none suited her joyous style of dancing better than Voices of Spring (1983), a pas de deux created by Ashton for a New Year's gala performance of Die Fledermaus at the Royal Opera House. Upon entering the party scene, carried aloft by Wayne Eagling, smiling and strewing flower petals, she and he danced Ashton's buoyant choreography to Strauss's famous waltz. She was a director of the Royal Ballet School in London between 1983 and 1998.

== Roles created ==
- 1963. Kingdom of the Shades (act 3 of La Bayadère), choreography by Rudolf Nureyev, after Marius Petipa; music by Ludwig Minkus. Role: Shade, solo variation.
- 1967. Shadowplay, choreography by Antony Tudor, music by Charles Koechlin. Role: Celestial, with Derek Rencher as Terrestrial and Anthony Dowell as the Boy with Matted Hair.
- 1968. Jazz Calendar, choreography by Sir Frederick Ashton, music by Richard Rodney Bennett. Role: Tuesday, a pas de trois with Anthony Dowell and Robert Mead.
- 1968. The Nutcracker, staged by Rudolf Nureyev, music by Pyotr Ilyich Tchaikovsky. Role: Clara.
- 1972. The Walk to the Paradise Garden, choreography by Frederick Ashton, music by Frederick Delius. Role: principal dancer in a pas de trois with David Wall and Derek Rencher.
- 1974. Elite Syncopations, choreography by Kenneth MacMillan, music by Scott Joplin and others. Roles: "Stop Time Rag" and "Bethena, a Concert Waltz.".
- 1976. Lulu, choreography by Jack Carter, music by Darius Milhaud. Role: Lulu.
- 1977. Bohemian Rhapsody, music and lyrics by Freddie Mercury of the rock band Queen. Special performance at a charity gala on behalf of the City of Westminster Society for Mentally Handicapped Children. Role: principal dancer.
- 1978. Mayerling, choreography by Kenneth MacMillan, music by Franz Liszt, arranged and orchestrated by John Lanchbery. Role: Countess Marie Larisch.
- 1979. La Fin du Jour, choreography by Kenneth MacMillan, music by Maurice Ravel. Role: principal dancer.
- 1980. Adieu, choreography by David Bintley, music by Andrzej Panufnik. Role: principal dancer.
- 1981. Isadora, choreography by Kenneth MacMillan, music by Richard Rodney Bennett. Role: Isadora.
- 1983. Voices of Spring, choreography by Frederick Ashton, music by Johann Strauss II. Role: dancer in pas de deux with Wayne Eagling.

== Selected videography ==
- 1959. John Cranko: Pineapple Poll danced by the Royal Ballet, with Merle Park as Poll, David Blair as Jasper the Pot Boy, Stanley Holden as Captain Belaye, Brenda Taylor as Blanche and Gerd Larsen as Mrs Dimple. A BBC recording, with the London Symphony Orchestra, conducted by Charles Mackerras. DVD, International Classical Artists; released 2011 (coupled with The Lady and the Fool).
- 1960. Choreography by Bournonville. The pas de deux from The Flower Festival in Genzano, danced by Merle Park as Rosa and Rudolf Nureyev as Paolo. A BBC recording. DVD, International Classical Artists; released 2013 (coupled with La Sylphide).
- 1968. The Nutcracker, staged by Rudolf Nureyev, directed by John Vernon, and danced by the Royal Ballet, with Nureyev and Merle Park in the starring roles. DVD, Kultur Video; released 2000.
- 1972. The Special London Bridge Special, directed by David Winters and starring Tom Jones, Jennifer O'Neill, and Kirk Douglas. Includes a dramatic pas de deux choreographed by Rudolf Nureyev and danced by him and Merle Park impersonating The Carpenters. DVD, Winters Hollywood Entertainment Holding Corporation.
- 1981-1982. In the title role of the ballet Isadora, featured in the 50th anniversary BBC programme 'Right Royal Company', in May 1981, and filmed by Granada Television with the original cast, broadcast in 1982, and issued on DVD in 2011 by Odeon Entertainment (with the 1968 feature film Isadora.
- 1983. An Evening with the Royal Ballet, a documentary directed by Anthony Asquith and Anthony Havelock-Allan. Margot Fonteyn, Rudolf Nureyev, David Blair, Antoinette Sibley, Graham Usher, and Merle Park appear as themselves. Includes the pas de deux from Le Corsaire, with Fonteyn and Nureyev, and excerpts from Les Sylphides, Aurora's Wedding, and La Valse. DVD, Kultur Video; released 2001.
- 1984. Die Fledermaus, a TV movie of the operetta by Johann Strauss II, directed by Humphrey Burton, conducted by Placido Domingo, and starring Kiri Te Kanawa and Hermann Prey. Includes Voices of Spring, a pas de deux choreographed by Frederick Ashton and danced by Merle Park and Wayne Eagling. DVD, Warner Music Group Germany; released 2003.
- 1991. Rudolf Nureyev, a documentary produced and directed by Patricia Foy. Merle Park is among Nureyev's colleagues who appear as themselves. DVD, Kultur Video; released 2013.

== Teaching activities ==
In 1977, while still the senior ballerina of the Royal Ballet, Park opened her own school in London and became a popular teacher, as she was able to imbue her students with the joy of dancing as well as instructing them in the basics and fine points of classical technique. A member of the Imperial Society of Teachers of Dancing, she was named a director of the Royal Ballet School in 1983. With her mastery of technique and knowledge of style, she was instrumental in maintaining the high standards that made it the preeminent school of classical ballet in the United Kingdom.

== Honors and awards ==
Park was named Commander of the Most Excellent Order of the British Empire (CBE) in the 1974 Queen's Honours List. In 1982, she was the recipient of the Queen Elizabeth II Coronation Award, the highest award bestowed by the Royal Academy of Dance. Four years later, in 1986, she was honored with the title of Dame Commander of the Most Excellent Order of the British Empire (DBE) for her services to ballet in the United Kingdom.

== Personal life ==
Park was married twice. Her first husband was James Monahan, whom she wed in 1965 and with whom she had one child. As the dance critic of The Guardian newspaper in London, he had admired her since early in her career. After their divorce in 1970, she married Sidney Bloch and was widowed upon his death in 2000. We can read pieces of interview with her on Gramilano website, where her personality is shown.
