= List of 1950s ballet premieres =

This is a list of ballet premieres in the 1950s, by year.

== 1951 ==
title	choreographer	composer	company	venue or presentation	date
La Valse	George Balanchine	Maurice Ravel	New York City Ballet	City Center of Music and Drama	February 20
Pineapple Poll	John Cranko	Arthur Sullivan	Sadler's Wells Ballet	Sadler's Wells Theatre	March 13
The Cage	Jerome Robbins	Igor Stravinsky	New York City Ballet	City Center of Music and Drama	June 10
Tiresias	Frederick Ashton	Constant Lambert	Royal Ballet	Royal Opera House	July 9
Swan Lake	George Balanchine	Pyotr Ilyich Tchaikovsky	New York City Ballet	City Center of Music and Drama	November 20

== 1957 ==
title	choreographer	composer	company	venue or presentation	date
The Prince of the Pagodas	John Cranko	Benjamin Britten	The Royal Ballet	Royal Opera House	January 1
Square Dance	George Balanchine	Antonio Vivaldi	New York City Ballet	New York City Center	November 21
Agon	George Balanchine	Igor Stravinsky	New York City Ballet	New York City Center	December 1
