= On the Dnieper =

Ballet by Sergei Prokofiev

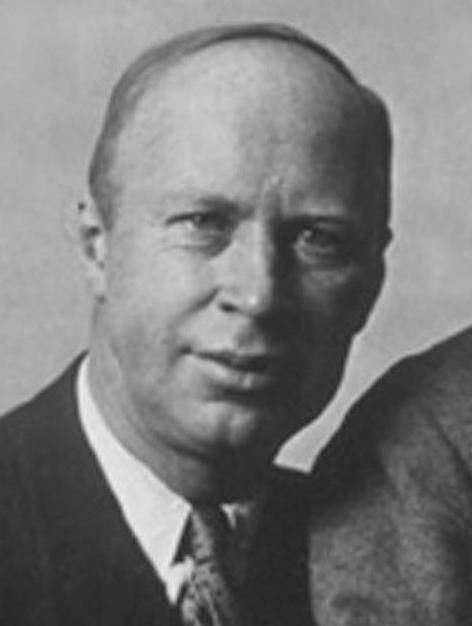
Sergei Prokofiev in 1936

On the Dnieper (На Днепре), Op. 51, is a ballet in two scenes with prelude and epilogue by Sergei Prokofiev. Composed in 1931 as his fourth work in the genre, it resulted from a commission by the Paris Opera Ballet after the unexpected death in 1929 of Ballets Russes founder Sergei Diaghilev and after the success of The Prodigal Son. The premiere took place in 1932; a year later Prokofiev extracted an orchestral suite from the work, Op. 51 bis, using six of its twelve movements.

== Background ==
Sergei Diaghilev, the impresario who had led Ballets Russes to distinguished success, died suddenly in 1929, hence ending Prokofiev's collaboration with the troupe. (The Prodigal Son was the last such collaboration.) Seeing the success of the work, the Paris Opéra commissioned Prokofiev to write another ballet. Serge Lifar, formerly a close associate with Diaghilev, was responsible for creating the setting and choreography. However, he did not place any significance to the scenario. Rather, the ballet was created as a sequence of dances. On the Dnieper was the result of this collaboration.

Lifar, in his 1965 book La danse, said that he was disappointed with Prokofiev's score. Lifar claimed to have been inspired by Russian folkdance, but acknowledges that critics found his own choreography insufficiently Russian.

Preparations for the ballet were marked by the sudden withdrawal of Olga Spessivtseva who was to have had the leading female role. Spessivtseva had had a series of successes with Lifar at the Paris Opera Ballet (Promethee, Giselle) and had unrequited feelings for him. In his book The Three Graces: Anna Pavlova, Tamara Karsavina, Olga Spessivtseva (1959) Lifar describes how their personal situation came to a head during rehearsals. "The two heroines of this ballet were named Natasha and Olga. I have already mentioned the friendship which had sprung up at this time between Natasha P... [Natalie Paley] and myself. It was, therefore, perhaps a little cruel to give these two names, Natasha and Olga, to the heroines. Be that as it may, the role of Olga was allotted to Spessivtseva, while the male part, Serge, was to be interpreted by me. The crisis came when, at one of the rehearsals, Spessivtseva suddenly realized that it was with Natasha ... that in pursuance of the plot, I was to find happiness, whereas the leading, and, from the choreographic point of view, the most important role had been allotted to her, Olga! This crisis, as always with her, developed with the speed of lightning. Just as I had announced at rehearsal, that this was where my pas de deux tendre with Natasha would begin, Spessivtseva all of a sudden made a dash for the window. In one bound I reached her, but, by that time she was already through it. I just managed to clutch her arm. My pianist, Leonide Gontcharov, who was hard on my heels, sprang to my assistance. Olga hung there, suspended from our arms, thirty feet above the Place Charles-Garnier. With great difficulty we managed to drag her back. She fought, bit and scratched in an effort to break free ... Next day she did not turn up at rehearsal, but sent word to me that she had left the Opera forever."

== Analysis ==
Prokofiev continued to develop his lyrical line of composition in On the Dnieper, even more so than in The Prodigal Son. These two lyrical ballets provided much experience for the composer, who was about to start writing his first ballet in the Russian tradition: Romeo and Juliet.

== Plot ==
Sergei, a Red Army soldier in the First World War returns to his village on the Dnieper and finds he is no longer in love with Natasha, his betrothed. Instead, he falls in love with Olga. Olga's parents intend for her to marry another man whom she does not love. Sergei and Olga's friends fight. Sergei falls, but the lovers are saved by the compassionate Natasha who helps the couple to escape the village.

The ballet contains 12 numbers, lasting around 40 minutes:

1. Prelude
2. Scene 1: The Meeting
3. Scene 1: Mime Scene
4. Scene 1: Pas de deux
5. Scene 1: Variation of the First Dancer
6. Scene 2: Betrothal
7. Scene 2: Bridegroom's Dance
8. Scene 2: Bride's Dance
9. Scene 2: Men's Dance
10. Scene 2: The Quarrel
11. Scene 2: Mime Scene
12. Epilogue

== Premiere ==
The ballet was premiered on 16 December 1932, but it turned out to be a flop, especially when critics had been anticipating a work similar in character to The Prodigal Son. Because Prokofiev left for America the next day, he was unaware of the disappointed reviews. The ballet was withdrawn from the stage after a few performances, although Stravinsky and Milhaud warmly praised the music after the premiere. Afterwards, Prokofiev extracted an orchestral suite from the ballet (as he did for his other stage works) as Op. 51a.

== Revival ==
In 2009 Alexei Ratmansky choreographed the Prokofiev score anew for American Ballet Theatre. In his version, Sergei returns his village to discover that he no longer loves his sweetheart, Natalia, but is instead attracted to Olga, who is to wed another man. "Grief-stricken yet noble, Natalia unselfishly helps the young lovers, Sergei and Olga, to escape together to a life of happiness." In the premiere of this version, Marcelo Gomes danced the role of Sergei, Paloma Herrera the role of Olga, Veronika Part the role of Natalia, and David Hallberg the role of Olga's Fiancé.

== Recordings ==
Orchestra	Conductor	Record Company	Year of Recording	Format
State Symphony Capella of Russia	Valeri Polyansky	Chandos Records	2003	CD
WDR Sinfonieorchester Köln	Michail Jurowski	CPO	1998	CD
USSR Ministry of Culture State Symphony Orchestra	Gennadi Rozhdestvensky	Melodiya	1982	CD/LP

== Suite from On the Dnieper ==
Suite from On The Dnieper, Op. 51a, is intended for concert performance and contains six movements, lasting for around 20 minutes:

1. Prelude
2. Variation of the First Dancer
3. The Betrothal
4. The Quarrel
5. Scene
6. Epilogue

=== Recordings ===
Orchestra	Conductor	Record Company	Year of Recording	Format
National Symphony Orchestra of Ukraine	Theodore Kuchar	Naxos Records	1994	CD
Monte Carlo Philharmonic Orchestra	James DePreist	Koch	2001	CD
