= François Benoist =

French organist, pedagogue and composer (1794–1878)

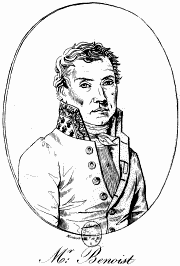
François Benoist

François Benoist (French pronunciation: [fʁɑ̃swa bənwa]; 10 September 1794 – 6 May 1878) was a French organist, pedagogue, and composer.

== Life and career ==
Benoist was born in Nantes on 10 September 1794. He took his first music lessons under Georges Scheuermann. Benoist studied music at the Conservatoire de Paris and won the Prix de Rome in 1815 for his cantata Œnone. In 1819, he became organist (organiste du roi) and professor of organ at the Conservatoire; he held the latter post for half a century.

His students included César Franck, Camille Saint-Saëns, Charles Lecocq, Georges Bizet, Louis Lefébure-Wely, Léo Delibes, and Adolphe Adam.

As composer, he was comparatively unimportant, but he wrote two operas, four ballets, one Requiem Mass, and numerous works for organ. He died in Paris.

== Selected compositions ==
- Léonore et Félix, opéra-comique, 1821
- Chœur d'adieu, 1836
- La Gipsy, ballet, 1839
- Le Diable amoureux, ballet, 1840
- Bibliothèque de l'organiste, 12 volumes, 1841–1861
- Messe de Requiem pour trois voix d'homme et une d'enfant, avec accompagnement d'orgue ad libitum, 1842.
- Othello, opera, 1844
- L'Apparition, opera, 1848
- Nisida ou les Amazones des Açores, ballet (book by Eugène Deligny), 1848
- Pâquerette, ballet (with Arthur Saint-Léon), 1851
- Deux Préludes, 1860
- Recueil de quatre morceaux pour orgue : Andante, Fugue sur le "Pange lingua", Marche religieuse, Communion, 1878
- Messe à 4 voix, orgue et orchestre, 1861
- Ave Maria pour mezzo-soprano
- Kyrie à 4 voix
- O Salutaris à une voix,
- Cantique à la Sainte Vierge

== See also ==
See: List of music students by teacher: A to B#François Benoist.
