= List of 1900s ballet premieres =

This is a list of ballets that premiered in the 1900s, by year.

== 1900 ==
title	choreographer	composer	company	venue or presentation	date	Notes
Les Millions d'Arlequin	Marius Petipa	Riccardo Drigo	Imperial Ballet	Imperial Theatre of the Hermitage	February 10	
The Seasons	Marius Petipa	Alexander Glazunov	Imperial Ballet	Imperial Theatre of the Hermitage	February 20	

== 1905 ==
title	choreographer	composer	company	venue or presentation	date
The Dying Swan	Mikhail Fokine	Camille Saint-Saëns	Noblemen's Hall	St. Petersburg	December 22
