= Fancy Free (ballet) =

1944 ballet by Leonard Bernstein

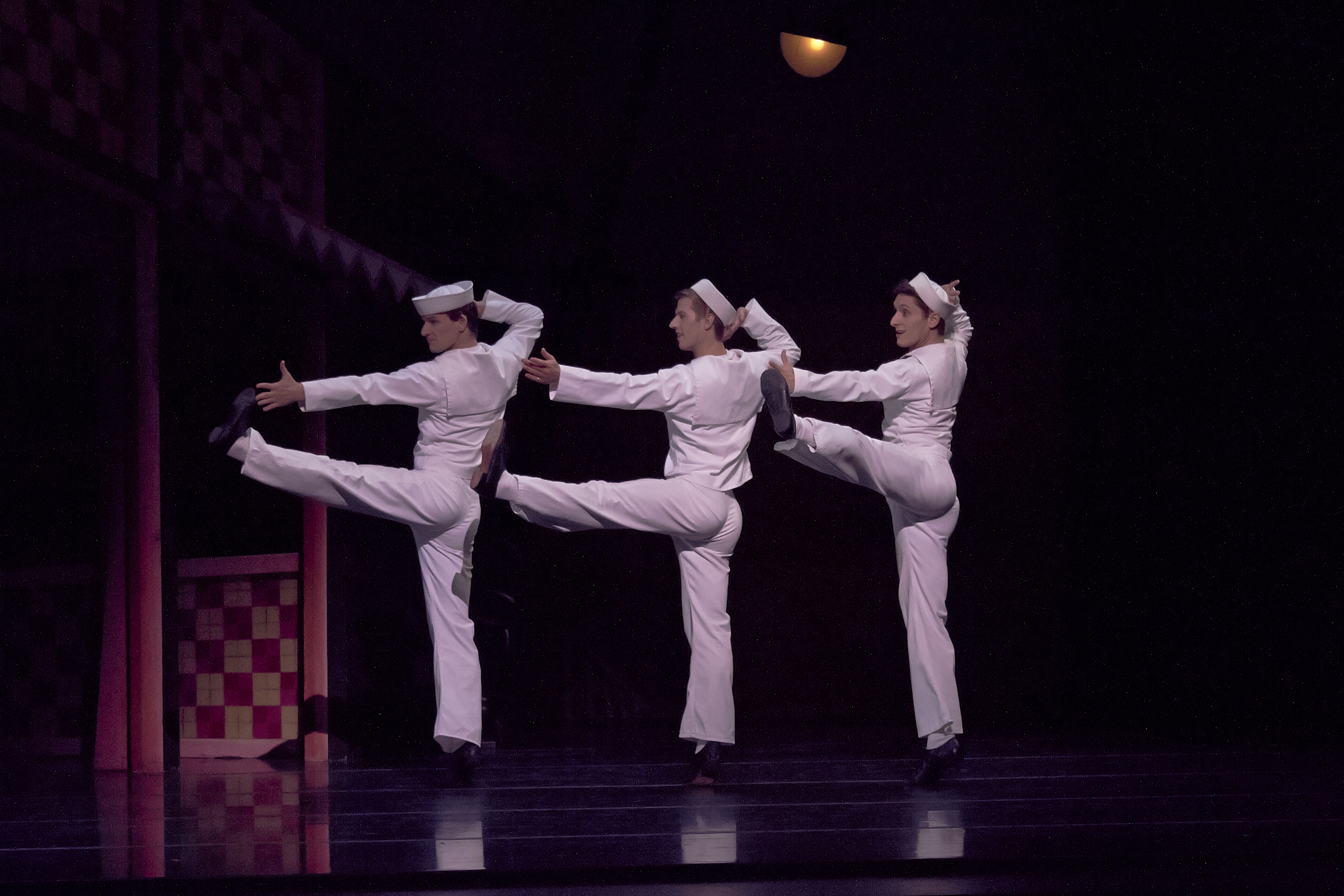
Kansas City Ballet in Fancy Free

Fancy Free is a ballet composed in 1944 by Leonard Bernstein. The Ballet Theatre premiered the ballet with choreography by Jerome Robbins, scenery by Oliver Smith, costumes by Kermit Love, and lighting by Ronald Bates. The premiere took place on Tuesday, 18 April 1944 at the old Metropolitan Opera House, New York. The New York City Ballet premiere took place on Thursday, 31 January 1980. Fancy Free provided the basis for the later musical, On the Town. A portion of the score was also used in the opening scenes of Alfred Hitchcock's Rear Window.

== Synopsis ==
The scene is a bar and the outside sidewalk in New York City, in wartime. Three sailors on liberty boisterously arrive, have a drink (two of their number conning the third into paying), and head outside looking for female companionship. A beautiful girl passes by and the three sailors vie for her attention. She demurs and escapes, pursued by two of the sailors. The Third, having been left in the dust, encounters another beautiful passer-by, and invites her to have a drink with him. He impresses her with a pantomime of his military exploits, and they dance a passionate pas de deux.

The other two sailors arrive with the first girl, who recognizes the second girl as a friend. The sailors realize their predicament: three men, but only two girls. The couples dance and change partners, with one always left dancing alone. Finally, it is decided that the three sailors will hold a contest and the loser will go dateless. Each sailor performs a solo variation (a galop, a waltz, and a danzon), but they're so equally matched that the girls can't decide and the boys come to blows. In the midst of the fistfight, the girls flee in terror. Seeing their dates vanish, the sailors pick themselves up, have another drink and head outside again. Another beautiful girl passes by, and the three sailors take off in hot pursuit.

== Original cast ==
- Muriel Bentley
- Janet Reed
- Shirley Eckl
- John Kriza
- Harold Lang
- Jerome Robbins

== Musical inspiration ==
A small portion of Fancy Free was apparently recycled from "Riobamba", a theme song Bernstein had written for a short-lived New York City nightclub of the same name.

== Fancy Free (1946 album) ==
Fancy Free

Soundtrack album by Leonard Bernstein
- Released: 1946
- Recorded: June 2, 1944, & March 13, 1946
- Genre: Ballet / Jazz
- Label: Decca Records; Decca DA-406

In 1946, Decca Records released an album of the score for Fancy Free (Decca DA-406), conducted by Leonard Bernstein. Issued before the introduction of the LP, it was initially released in 78rpm album format, in which four 78 rpm records were bound together in a photo album style book, with a booklet included. Each of the seven movements of the ballet, plus the introductory vocal number Big Stuff, comprised one side of a 78. The sides were sequenced with the last number backing the first, the second-last the second, and so on, so that all four discs could be stacked and played in sequence, then flipped en masse to complete the album. The album was rereleased in 1953 in the new 10" LP format (DL 6023).

The music was recorded by the Ballet Theatre Orchestra on June 2, 1944, and conducted by Bernstein himself, except for the song Big Stuff. Big Stuff was performed by Billie Holiday, who was also signed to Decca, along with a band composed of Joe Guy (trumpet), Joe Springer (piano), Tiny Grimes (guitar), Billy Taylor (bass), and Kelly Martin (drums). Bernstein had composed the song with Holiday in mind, to be played as a recording in the theatre before the ballet proper began. He knew Holiday from her Cafe Society days, but at the beginning of his career did not believe he was in a position to have her record his song, so originally in 1944 the song heard in the ballet was a recording made by his own sister, Shirley. But Holiday heard and liked the tune, and recorded it several times, with this recording made March 13, 1946.

- Big Stuff (Prologue) (with Billie Holiday (DA-23463-a)
- Pt. I: Opening Dance (DA-23464-a)
- Pt. II: Scene at the Bar (DA-23465-a)
- Pt. III: Pas de Deux (DA-23466-a)
- Pt. IV: The Competition Scene (DA-23466-b)
- Pt. V: Galop Variation (DA-23465-b)
- Pt. VI: Waltz Variation (DA-23464-b)
- Pt. VII: Danzon Variation
- Pt. VIII: Finale (DA-23463-b)

== Articles ==
- NY Times, Anna Kisselgoff, February 2, 1980
- NY Times, Jack Anderson, February 5, 1980
- NY Times, April 19, 1945

== Reviews ==
- NY Times, John Martin, October 10, 1944
- NY Times, John Martin, April 19, 1944
