= Four Bagatelles =

Four Bagatelles is New York City Ballet ballet master Jerome Robbins' only ballet made to the music of Beethoven: Bagatelles, Op. 33, Nos. 4, 5, and 2 (in order of performance) and Bagatelles, Op. 126, No. 4. The premiere took place on Thursday, 10 January 1974 at the New York State Theater, Lincoln Center. The ballet was revived for the 2008 Spring Jerome Robbins celebration.

== Original cast ==
- Gelsey Kirkland
- Jean-Pierre Bonnefoux

== Articles ==
- Sunday NY Times, Clive Barnes, May 26, 1974

== Reviews ==
- NY Times, Anna Kisselgoff, January 12, 1974
- Sunday NY Times, Clive Barnes, February 17, 1974
- Sunday NY Times, Deborah Jowitt, December 8, 1974
- NY Times, Alastair Macaulay, June 12, 2008
- NY Times, Alastair Macaulay, October 1, 2009
