= Variations (ballet) =

Variations is a ballet made by New York City Ballet co-founder and founding choreographer George Balanchine to Stravinsky's Variations: Aldous Huxley in memoriam (1963–64). The premiere took place on Thursday, 31 March 1966 at the New York State Theater, Lincoln Center; Balanchine made a new version for City Ballet's 1982 Stravinsky Centennial Celebration.

== Cast ==
=== Original ===
- Suzanne Farrell

== Reviews ==
- NY Times review by Clive Barnes, 1 April 1966
