= List of 1930s ballet premieres =

This is a list of ballet premieres in the 1930s, by year.

== 1932 ==
| title | choreographer | composer | company | venue or presentation | date |
|---|---|---|---|---|---|
| Flames of Paris | Vasili Vainonen | Boris Asafyev | Kirov Ballet | Kirov Theatre | November 7 |
| The Green Table | Kurt Jooss | Fritz Cohen | Folkwang Tanzbuhne | Théâtre des Champs-Élysées | July 3 |
| On the Dnieper | Serge Lifar | Sergei Prokofiev | Paris Opera Ballet | Palais Garnier | December 16 |
| Le Bourgeois Gentilhomme | George Balanchine | Richard Strauss | Ballets Russes de Monte-Carlo | Opéra de Monte-Carlo | |

== 1933 ==
| Title | Choreographer | Composer | Company | Venue or presentation | Date |
|---|---|---|---|---|---|
| Les Masques | Frederick Ashton | Francis Poulenc | | | March 5 |
| The Seven Deadly Sins | George Balanchine | Kurt Weill | Commission from Boris Kochno and Edward James | Théâtre des Champs-Élysées | June 7 |
| Mozartiana | George Balanchine | Pyotr Ilyich Tchaikovsky | Les Ballets 1933 | Théâtre des Champs-Élysées | June 7 |
| Les Rendezvous | Frederick Ashton | Daniel Auber | Vic-Wells Ballet | Sadler's Wells Theatre | December 5 |

== 1934 ==
| title | choreographer | composer | company | venue or presentation | date |
|---|---|---|---|---|---|
| Bar aux Folies-Bergère | Ninette de Valois | Emmanuel Chabrier | Ballet Rambert | Mercury Theatre | May 15 |
| Serenade | George Balanchine | Pyotr Ilyich Tchaikovsky | School of American Ballet | Felix M. Warburg's estate in White Plains, New York, United States | June 10 |
| The Fountain of Bakhchisarai | Rostislav Zakharov | Boris Asafiev | Kirov Academic Theatre of Opera and Ballet | Mariinsky Theatre | September 28 |
