= Pineapple Poll =

Gilbert and Sullivan-inspired comic ballet

- Choreographer: John Cranko
- Music: Arthur Sullivan arranged by Charles Mackerras
- Based on: "The Bumboat Woman's Story" by W. S. Gilbert
- Premiere: 13 March 1951; Sadler's Wells Theatre
- Original ballet company: Sadler's Wells Ballet
- Setting: Portsmouth, England and on board the H.M.S. Hot Cross Bun
- Genre: Neoclassical ballet
- Type: comic ballet

Pineapple Poll is a Gilbert and Sullivan-inspired comic ballet, created by choreographer John Cranko with arranger Sir Charles Mackerras. Pineapple Poll is based on "The Bumboat Woman's Story", one of W. S. Gilbert's Bab Ballads, written in 1870. The Gilbert and Sullivan opera H.M.S. Pinafore was also based, in part, on this story. For the ballet, Cranko expanded the story of the Bab Ballad and added a happy ending. All the music is arranged from Sullivan's music.

The piece premiered in 1951 at Sadler's Wells Theatre and was given many revivals internationally during the following decades. It remains in the repertoire of the Birmingham Royal Ballet. It has also been recorded many times.

== Background ==
Mackerras and his family were Gilbert and Sullivan fans. As a youth, at the all-male St Aloysius College in Sydney, he played Kate in The Pirates of Penzance, Leila in Iolanthe and Ko-Ko in The Mikado. In 1941–42, while at the NSW State Conservatorium of Music, he played the oboe for the J. C. Williamson Company during one of their Gilbert and Sullivan seasons. He was also a rehearsal pianist for the Kirsova Ballet company, where he became familiar with the successful ballets based on Offenbach, Strauss and Rossini music: Gaîté Parisienne, Le Beau Danube and La Boutique fantasque. He felt that a similar arrangement of the music of Sullivan would also be popular.

He had to wait a decade until the copyright on Sullivan's music expired at the end of 1950. Meanwhile, Mackerras had moved to London, studied conducting in Prague and, in 1948, become assistant conductor and repetiteur for Sadler's Wells Opera. Peggy van Praagh suggested that he work out the idea with the young choreographer John Cranko. Cranko expanded the plot of W. S. Gilbert's Bab Ballad "The Bumboat Woman's Story", in which the central character is named Poll Pineapple. The Gilbert and Sullivan opera H.M.S. Pinafore (especially its character Little Buttercup) was also based, in part, on this story. Cranko introduced new characters (Mrs Dimple) and gave Poll an admirer to enable a happy ending. Mackerras arranged the score of Pineapple Poll from the Gilbert and Sullivan repertoire, as well as Sullivan's comic opera Cox and Box (written with F. C. Burnand), and Sullivan's Overture di Ballo. Music from all of the extant Gilbert and Sullivan operas is included, except for Utopia Limited and The Grand Duke.

== Productions and recordings ==
Pineapple Poll premiered on 13 March 1951 at Sadler's Wells Theatre by the Sadler's Wells Ballet as part of the Festival of Britain. It was part of an evening of four Cranko ballets. The production was designed by Osbert Lancaster, who later designed the 1971 D'Oyly Carte production of The Sorcerer. The ballet was a critical and popular success Sadler's Wells also toured this in the US. The ballet was later produced by the Borovansky Ballet in 1954, Covent Garden in 1959, National Ballet of Canada in 1959, the Joffrey Ballet at City Center in New York City in 1970, Noverre Ballet in 1972 and Oslo Ballet in 1975. In recent years, the ballet has fallen out of the professional ballet repertory in the US, although there was a revival in 2004 by Spectrum Dance Theater of Seattle, with new choreography by Donald Byrd, and it is sometimes played as an orchestral piece. The ballet is occasionally produced by amateur groups. In the UK, it remains in the repertoire of the Birmingham Royal Ballet, with a run of performances in 2006 and 2007 and a tour, including to Sadler's Wells Theatre, in 2011.

The score, or excerpts from it, has been recorded at least seven times, including four performances conducted by Mackerras himself. Gervase Hughes wrote, "Although the orchestration is disfigured by over-reliance on glissando harps and succulent counter-subjects for the horns, much of the music comes over well in its new guise, and the combination of a melody from the opening chorus of Patience with the second act quintet from The Gondoliers is quite brilliant." A black-and-white studio film of Pineapple Poll, danced by the Royal Ballet, with the London Symphony Orchestra conducted by Mackerras, was broadcast by BBC television in 1959. It starred Merle Park, David Blair and Stanley Holden. A DVD of this film was released in 2011 (also including The Lady and the Fool). A review in Musicweb International commented, "As a score, [Pineapple Poll] quite simply sparkles like freshly popped champagne. ... In fact, this is a comic masterpiece. Any viewer will be impressed with the vivacious dancing and the 'built in' humour which pervades the work ... would that it had been in colour! The costumes look as if they would have been absolutely magnificent. ... [T]he studio-based performance means that there is a distinct lack of the atmosphere that an audience would have provided." Medici.tv also broadcast this film in 2011.

== Synopsis ==
=== Scene 1 ===
H.M.S. Hot Cross Bun has arrived in Portsmouth, and the sailors, who are on shore leave, meet some pretty town's girls whom they like. Pineapple Poll then arrives with a basket of flowers. The sailors buy the flowers from Pineapple Poll to give to their girlfriends, some doing so reluctantly. Jasper, the 'pot boy' at the local inn, serves drinks to some of the sailors. Jasper is very interested in Pineapple Poll, but she haughtily rejects his proffered love.

Captain Belaye of H.M.S. Hot Cross Bun then arrives, and the sailors are horrified when their girlfriends swoon at the sight of the Captain. The sailors attempt to stop the girls, without success. Pineapple Poll also tries to capture the Captain's attention, but she does not have Jasper's restraining hand to stop her. When Captain Belaye is finally left alone, a girl (Blanche) arrives with her aunt (Mrs. Dimple). It is love at first sight for both the Captain and Blanche. Mrs. Dimple is initially opposed to the Captain's interest in her niece, but she finally relents.

When Captain Belaye returns to the port, the town's girls and Pineapple Poll once again try to capture his interest. Captain Belaye manages to escape from the girls with much difficulty, and the girls are then left sighing after the Captain, while the members of his crew vent their anger against him.

=== Scene 2 ===
It is nightfall, and some 'sailors' go up the gangplank to board the ship. Pineapple Poll arrives on the wharf with some naval clothes in which she then dresses herself (off-stage), following which Pineapple Poll also then goes up the gangplank to the ship.

Jasper arrives at the wharf and is devastated to find Pineapple Poll's clothes. He mistakenly assumes that Pineapple Poll has drowned. Despondently, he gathers up Pineapple Poll's clothing and leaves.

=== Scene 3 ===
The following morning, on board H.M.S. Hot Cross Bun, Captain Belaye is taking his 'crew' through drill. Although his 'crew' is dressed in the usual ship's uniforms, they are far smaller in build than usual – however, the Captain does not seem to realise that there is a disparity in their heights. The uniform which Pineapple Poll is wearing is not a uniform which a sailor would wear on board H.M.S. Hot Cross Bun, and she continually exercises en pointe, but the Captain appears oblivious to anything unusual about her as well. Captain Belaye also does not notice that his 'sailors' are looking up adoringly at him. When the cannon is fired, he is surprised at the reaction of the 'sailors', including Pineapple Poll (who faints at the sound). A church bell then tolls in the distance, and the Captain leaves the ship. A short while later, the Captain returns to the ship with Blanche (who is dressed as a bride) and Mrs. Dimple. The 'crew' all faint with shock. Pineapple Poll is the first to recover and to demonstrate to Captain Belaye that she is female. Then the other 'sailors' demonstrate that they, too, are female. Blanche is horrified, as is her aunt, at the ship's crew all being girls, and the Captain looks stunned.

The ship's genuine crew then arrive, as does Jasper. The sailors are very annoyed with their girlfriends, and the girls have to coax and cajole the sailors to take them back. Jasper has a tougher time with Pineapple Poll, who is still hankering after the Captain.

Belaye, who has now been promoted to the rank of Admiral, returns to the deck with his bride, Blanche, and Blanche's Aunt, Mrs. Dimple. Pineapple Poll swoons at the sight of the Admiral, much to Jasper's distress. Mrs. Dimple calls to Jasper and then gives him the Admiral's former Captain's attire. Jasper puts on the Captain's hat and coat – and becomes the new Captain of H.M.S. Hot Cross Bun as a result (even though Jasper has never been a sailor), and Pineapple Poll's affections and interest are immediately transferred from the Admiral to Jasper. The sailors of H.M.S. Hot Cross Bun are most displeased that the 'pot boy' has suddenly been elevated to be their Captain, and they openly show their disdain for him.

All of the girls then return to the ship's deck, wearing their own clothes, and are welcomed back by their delighted boyfriends. The girls swoon at the sight of Jasper in his new Captain's uniform, but this time the sailors are able to keep their girlfriends in check, and all ends happily.

== Ballet music ==
Music for the ballet is taken from eleven of the Gilbert and Sullivan operas, Cox and Box and the Overture di Ballo, as specified below:

Scene 1

- Opening Dance – (The Mikado; Trial by Jury; Patience; The Sorcerer; The Gondoliers)
- Poll's Solo and Pas de Deux – (The Gondoliers; Patience)
- Belaye's Solo – (Patience; Cox and Box)
- Pas de trois – (The Mikado; The Pirates of Penzance; Ruddigore)
- Finale – (Patience; The Pirates of Penzance; Ruddigore; Iolanthe)

Scene 2

- Poll's Solo – (Iolanthe)
- Jasper's Solo – (Princess Ida)

Scene 3

- Belaye's Solo and Sailors' Drill – (Princess Ida; The Gondoliers; Trial by Jury)
- Poll's Solo – (Ruddigore)
- Entrance of Belaye, with Blanche as Bride – (The Yeomen of the Guard; Trial by Jury; Iolanthe)
- Reconciliation – (Ruddigore)
- Grand Finale – (The Mikado; Trial by Jury; H.M.S. Pinafore; Patience; Princess Ida; The Pirates of Penzance; Overture di Ballo; The Yeomen of the Guard)

== Original cast ==
- David Blair, Captain Belaye
- Elaine Fifield, Poll
- Sheilah O'Reilly, Mrs Dimple
- David Poole, Jasper
