= The Dying Swan =

Ballet by Mikhail Fokine

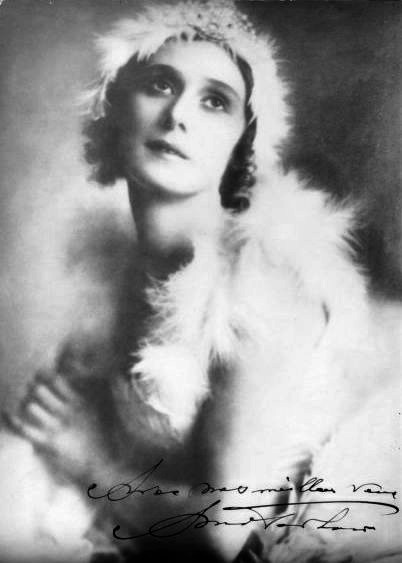
- Anna Pavlova in costume for The Dying Swan, Buenos Aires, Argentina, c. 1928
- Choreographer: Mikhail Fokine
- Music: Camille Saint-Saëns, (Le cygne from Le Carnaval des animaux)
- Premiere: 1907; St. Petersburg, Russia
- Created for: Anna Pavlova
- Genre: Romantic
- Type: Classical ballet

The Dying Swan (originally The Swan) is a solo dance choreographed by Mikhail Fokine to Camille Saint-Saëns's Le Cygne from Le Carnaval des animaux as a pièce d'occasion for the ballerina Anna Pavlova, who performed it about 4,000 times. The short ballet (four minutes) follows the last moments in the life of a swan, and was first presented in St. Petersburg, Russia in 1905. The ballet has since influenced modern interpretations of Odette, heroine of Tchaikovsky's ballet Swan Lake, and has inspired non-traditional interpretations as well as various adaptations.

== Legacy ==
Some ballerinas, including Ashley Bouder of New York City Ballet and Nina Ananiashvili, formerly of American Ballet Theatre and The Bolshoi Ballet, have used Dying Swan arms in Swan Lake when making Odette's exit at the end of Act II (the first lakeside scene).

In response to impact of the 2019–20 coronavirus pandemic on the performing arts, Carlos Acosta, artistic director of the Birmingham Royal Ballet, adapted Fokine's choreography with the ballerina raising her head at the end instead, and with Céline Gittens, principal dancer of the company, and the musicians performing in their respective homes. Misty Copeland, principal dancer with the American Ballet Theatre, invited 31 other dancers to dance The Swan to raise fund for the relief fund of the participating dancers' companies and other related funds.

== See also ==
- Alicia Markova "The Dying Swan" (painting)
