= Sarabande and Danse (d'Amboise) =

Sarabande and Danse is a ballet made by Jacques d'Amboise to Debussy's Sarabande (1901) and Danse (1890). The premiere took place May 29, 1975, as part of New York City Ballet's Ravel Festival at the Lincoln Center.

== Original cast ==
- Colleen Neary
- Bart Cook
- Kyra Nichols
- Francis Sackett
