= Piano-Rag-Music (Martins) =

Piano–Rag–Music is a ballet made by New York City Ballet balletmaster in chief Peter Martins to Stravinsky's eponymous music from 1919. The premiere took place on June 10, 1982, as part of City Ballets's Stravinsky Centennial Celebration at the New York State Theater, Lincoln Center.

== Original cast ==
- Darci Kistler
- Cornel Crabtree
- Afshin Mofid
- Peter Schetter
- Ulrik Trojaborg

== Reviews ==
- NY Times article by John Corry, June 6, 1982
- Kisselgoff, Anna (June 12, 1982). "CITY BALLET: STRAVINSKY PREMIERES". The New York Times.
