= Requiem Canticles (Robbins) =

Requiem Canticles is a ballet made for New York City Ballet's Stravinsky Festival by balletmaster Jerome Robbins to eponymous music from 1966 by Igor Stravinsky. The premiere took place June 25, 1972, at the New York State Theater, Lincoln Center.

== Original cast ==
- Merrill Ashley
- Susan Hendl
- Robert Maiorano
- Bruce Wells

== Reviews ==
NY Times, Clive Barnes, June 26, 1972
