= The Sun Also Rises (ballet) =

2013 ballet adaptation of Hemingway's novel

Hemingway: The Sun Also Rises
- 2013 Kennedy Center Promotional artwork
- Choreographer: Septime Webre
- Libretto: Septime Webre/Karen Zacarias
- Based on: The novel The Sun Also Rises by Ernest Hemingway
- Premiere: May 8, 2013; Kennedy Center
- Original ballet company: The Washington Ballet
- Setting: 1920s France & Spain
- Genre: Drama
- Website: Kennedy Center Website

The Sun Also Rises or Hemingway: The Sun Also Rises is a 2013 ballet adaptation of Ernest Hemingway's 1926 novel The Sun Also Rises that was premiered by The Washington Ballet at The Kennedy Center under Artistic Director Septime Webre, whose parents had known Hemingway. It is the first version of this work en pointe. It premiered from May 8 – 12, 2013. Webre had previously adapted The Great Gatsby and Alice in Wonderland to ballet. According to Emily Cary of The Washington Examiner, like the source, the plot is about "a group of American and British expatriates who meet in Paris and travel to Pamplona, Spain, to watch the running of the bulls and the bullfights." Clark notes that the production was inspired by one of Webre's friends who taught American literature at Yale University who suggested an adaptation.

== Cast and crew ==
The original cast featured Jared Nelson, Sona Kharatian, Brooklyn Mack and Jonathan Jordan in the roles of Jake Barnes, Lady Brett Ashley, Pedro Romero, and Bill Gorton, respectively. After reading the book, Webre wrote the libretto along with librettist Karen Zacarias and hired Billy Novick to write the music. Hugh Landwehr of New York University was the set designer. University of Maryland Department of Theatre professor Helen Huang was the costume designer. Clifton Taylor was the lighting designer

Original cast
Jared Nelson as Jake Barnes, an American journalist
Sona Kharatian as Lady Brett Ashley, an Englishwoman
Corey Landolt as Robert Cohn, Princeton educated writer and former boxer
Emily Ellis as Frances, Cohn’s girlfriend
Maki Onuki as Georgette, a French prostitute
Luis R. Torres as Count Mippipopolous, a Greek Aristocrat
Jonathan Jordan as Bill Gorton, Jake's war buddy
Melih Mertel as Mike Campbell, Brett's Scottish fiancé
Brooklyn Mack as Pedro Romero, the Celebrated Bullfighter

== Critical review ==
Alistair Macaulay of The New York Times noted that he had cynical expectations, but in the end felt that "Although I think this dance drama eventually doesn’t quite succeed, what’s impressive is how near it comes to doing so." Sarah Kaufman of The Washington Post described the performance as "surprisingly restrained" and "lively and entertaining, if flawed".
