= Narkissos (ballet) =

Narkissos is a ballet made by Edward Villella to music by Robert Prince, from an idea by William D. Roberts. The premiere took place on 21 July 1966, with the New York City Ballet at the Saratoga Performing Arts Center, Saratoga Springs, NY.

== Original cast ==
- Patricia McBride
- Edward Villella
- Michael Steele

== Reviews ==
- NY Times review by Harold C. Schonberg, July 22, 1966
- NY Times review by Clive Barnes, November 25, 1966
- Sunday NY Times review by Clive Barnes, April 23, 1967
