= Pas de Deux (d'Amboise) =

Ballet made for New York City Ballet

Pas de Deux is a ballet made for New York City Ballet by Jacques d'Amboise to Webern's Six pieces for orchestra. The premiere took place May 29, 1969, at the New York State Theater, Lincoln Center.

== Original cast ==
- Deborah Flomine
- Jacques d'Amboise
