= Symphony in E-flat (ballet) =

1972 ballet by John Clifford to Stravinsky's music

Symphony in E-flat is a ballet made by John Clifford to Stravinsky's Symphony in E-flat, Op. 1 (1908). The premiere took place as part of New York City Ballet's Stravinsky Festival, June 20, 1972, at the New York State Theater, Lincoln Center, with Gelsey Kirkland and Peter Martins as the leading dancers.
