= Tricolore (ballet) =

Tricolore is a ballet made by New York City Ballet balletmaster Jerome Robbins, Peter Martins (subsequently City Ballet balletmaster in chief) and Jean-Pierre Bonnefoux, conceived and supervised by City Ballet co-founder and balletmaster George Balanchine, to music by Georges Auric, commissioned by the company in 1978. The premiere took place May 18 that year at the New York State Theater, Lincoln Center.

== Original cast ==
- Colleen Neary
- Merrill Ashley
- Karin von Aroldingen
- Sean Lavery
- Adam Luders

== Articles ==
- NY Times, Anna Kisselgoff, May 19th, 1978
- NY Times, April 20th, 1978
- Sunday NY Times, Anna Kisselgoff, May 18th, 1980
- NY Times, February 15th, 1981
- Kisselgoff, Anna (February 23, 1986). "CITY BALLET CHOREOGRAPHERS ARE HINTING AT DRAMA NOW". The New York Times.
