= The Nutcracker (Willam Christensen) =

1944 production of the Nutcracker

Tchaikovsky's now-classic 1892 ballet The Nutcracker received its first complete production in the U.S. on 24 December 1944, performed by the San Francisco Ballet. This production used the ballet's original plot and was choreographed by Willam Christensen, who danced the role of the Cavalier. Gisella Caccialanza, the wife of Lew Christensen, danced the role of the Sugar Plum Fairy. The staging was a huge success and one critic wrote: "We can't understand why a vehicle of such fantastic beauty and originality could be produced in Europe in 1892 with signal success [a factually erroneous claim] and never be produced in its entirety in this country until 1944. Perhaps choreographers will make up for lost time from now on." The company was the first in the U.S. to make the ballet an annual tradition, and for ten years, the only company in the United States performing the complete ballet, until George Balanchine's production opened in New York in 1954. (Annual productions of the San Francisco Ballet Nutcracker began in 1949.)

The San Francisco Ballet performs The Nutcracker annually to this day, though not necessarily with Christensen's choreography (their most recent version is choreographed by Helgi Tomasson). Christensen's Nutcracker continues in Salt Lake City, where it is performed annually by Christensen's Ballet West. The stage success of the Christensen version marked the first step in making productions of The Nutcracker annual Christmas season traditions all over the world – a phenomenon that did not really come to flower until the late 1960s.
