= Cinderella (Prokofiev) =

Ballet by Sergei Prokofiev

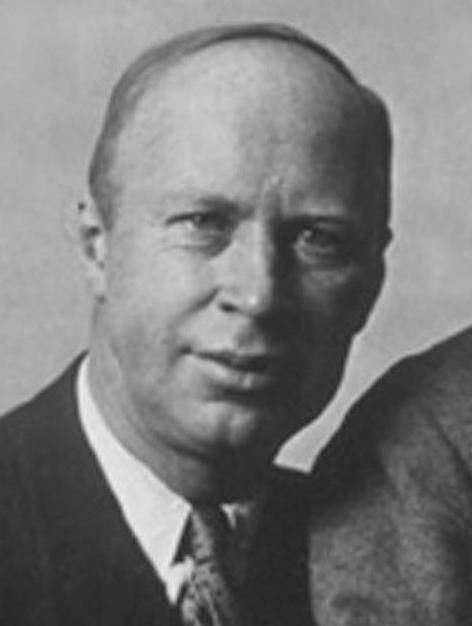
- Sergei Prokofiev in 1936
- Choreographer: Rostislav Zakharov
- Music: Sergei Prokofiev
- Libretto: Nikolai Volkov
- Based on: Cinderella
- Premiere: 21 November 1945; Bolshoi Theatre, Moscow
- Characters: Cinderella, Stepmother, Stepsisters, Fairy godmother, Prince.
- Genre: Narrative ballet

Cinderella (Russian: Золушка, tr. Zolushka; French: Cendrillon) Op. 87, is a ballet composed by Sergei Prokofiev to a scenario by Nikolai Volkov. It is one of his most popular and melodious compositions, and has inspired a great many choreographers since its inception. The piece was composed between 1940 and 1944. Part way through writing it Prokofiev broke off to write his opera War and Peace. The premiere of Cinderella was conducted by Yuri Fayer on 21 November, 1945, at the Bolshoi Theatre, with choreography by Rostislav Zakharov and Galina Ulanova in the title role. Cinderella is notable for its jubilant music, lush scenery, and for the comic double-roles of the stepmother and the two stepsisters (which can be performed in travesti), more mad than bad in this treatment.

== Story ==
Act I

Cinderella, a young woman whose domineering stepmother forces her to act as a servant in her own home, helps her stepmother and two stepsisters to prepare for the Spring Ball, at which it is rumoured that the Prince will choose his bride-to-be. As the two stepsisters work together to produce a new shawl, they get into an argument over who will wear it, and end up tearing it in two through their bickering. The pair storm off, while the step-mother orders Cinderella to clear up the remnants and finish her chores, as her father returns home from business. Since her father's remarriage, Cinderella has had to sleep by the kitchen fireplace, leaving her nothing to wear but rags covered in ashes. Her father has never moved past the grief of his first wife's death, and though he is concerned for his only daughter Cinderella, he is just as much under the stepmother's control as Cinderella herself is. Their brief peace is interrupted, however, as the stepmother and the two stepsisters reenter and begin ordering them about. During supper, a beggar woman turns up, asking for shelter. The two stepsisters and the stepmother try to chase her off, but Cinderella offers her a place by the kitchen fire and an old pair of slippers. The beggar thanks her for her kindness and departs, leaving the preparations for the ball to resume. After choosing dresses and a quick dancing lesson, the family finally sets off for the night with the father reluctantly in tow, leaving Cinderella behind.

Although lonely at first, she cheers herself up by dancing with her broom, imagining the Prince himself has asked her for a dance. She is surprised, however, when the old beggar woman appears out of nowhere, wishing to return the slippers with her thanks. To Cinderella's amazement, the shoes have been transformed into dancing slippers of glass. The old beggar woman throws off her disguise and reveals herself as Cinderella's fairy godmother, come to grant her wish of going to the ball. Summoning the fairies of Spring, Summer, Autumn and Winter for assistance, she turns Cinderella's rags into a beautiful dress, a pumpkin and mice into a carriage and horses, and grasshoppers and dragonflies into a retinue of footmen. As she is about to leave, however, the fairy godmother warns her that the magic will only last until midnight, at which time the spell will break, and everything will revert to its original form. Only the glass slippers will remain as a gift for her kindness. She then summons twelve dwarfs, who will appear to repeat her message if she has not left by midnight. With this warning in mind, Cinderella departs for the ball.

Act II

The Spring Ball is in full swing, with guests arriving from all over the kingdom and beyond to dance and pay respect to the Prince. The two stepsisters attempt to win favour with the royal court by showing off their dancing skills, but have less than successful results, much to their mother's dismay. The Prince then joins the celebrations, but finding state events such as the Spring Ball dull, and being reluctant to enter a marriage without love, he declines any offers for a dance, particularly in the case of the obnoxious step-sisters.

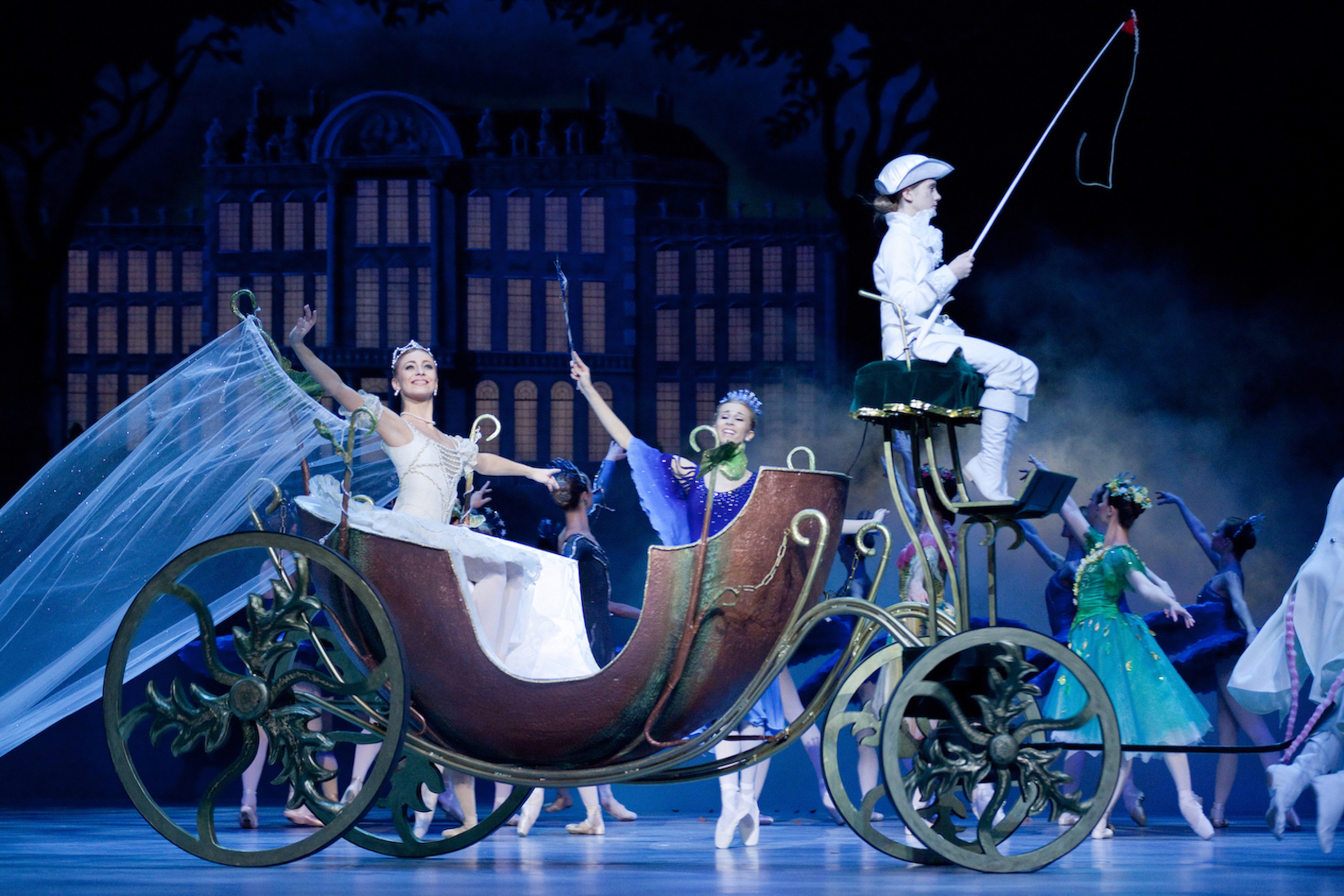
Cinderella by Frederick Ashton, Polish National Ballet, Warsaw 2010

Cinderella arrives at the palace, transformed beyond recognition into a beautifully dressed princess. The Prince, along with everyone else, is entranced by her beauty and charm, and for the first time, he asks for a dance. As the evening passes, Cinderella quickly becomes beloved by the entire court for her graciousness and charm, and the enamoured Prince spends the entire evening by her side. When refreshments are served, he gives her the honour of taking one of three oranges, a delicacy imported to the kingdom from a far-off land. Cinderella offers the other two oranges to her two stepsisters, who are so flattered by the attention that they do not recognize the beautiful stranger as their stepsister. The Prince takes Cinderella out to the royal gardens for an evening walk, where they dance and proclaim the love blossoming between them.

As they return to the ballroom for the next waltz, Cinderella has completely forgotten about the time in her happiness. However, at the first stroke of midnight, the twelve dwarfs spring from the great palace clock and remind Cinderella of her fairy godmother's warning. Terrified of being unmasked as a lowly servant in rags, she flees from the ballroom to the astonishment of the other guests. Though the Prince pursues her, she vanishes into the night moments before the spell breaks, losing one of her glass slippers in her haste and panic. The Prince is heartbroken at the thought of losing his love so soon after discovering her, but upon finding the lost slipper, he vows not to rest until he is once again reunited with her.

Act III

The morning after the ball, the Prince summons every shoemaker in the kingdom, in order to find out who the slipper was made for. However, none of them claim to have crafted the shoe, or sold it to anybody recently, and he concludes that the princess must be from a foreign land. His desperate search brings him first to the Mediterranean, then to the Orient, and lands further beyond. After travelling across the world and meeting various beautiful princesses with no success, the Prince begins to search his own kingdom, trying the slipper on every maiden who attended the ball.

Back at Cinderella's home, love has allowed the Prince to defy the laws of time and space; though she is only awakening the morning after the ball, he has already traveled the world and back again in search of his lost love. Upon waking, Cinderella initially believes that the events of the previous night were only a dream. As she relives some of the dances of the ball, she discovers the remaining glass slipper and realizes that it was all true. At breakfast, the two stepsisters reminisce about the ball, and argue about who made the greater impression on the Prince at the ball. Their fighting is interrupted when the father and the stepmother hurry in with the news that the Prince is on his way to their house, desperately trying a glass slipper on every girl he encounters. Upon his arrival, he tries the slipper on the two stepsisters, to no avail. The stepmother, however, demands to be given a chance and tries to force her foot into the shoe, ordering Cinderella to help her. As she bends down to assist, the remaining slipper falls from her pocket and the Prince finally recognizes Cinderella for who she is. As Cinderella successfully tries on both glass slippers, her stepfamily beg for her forgiveness, which she happily bestows upon them. Overjoyed to have rediscovered each other, Cinderella and the Prince are then transported away to a secret garden by the fairy godmother, where they confess their love for one another and are happily married.

== Instrumentation ==
The ballet is scored for a large orchestra consisting of piccolo, 2 flutes, 2 oboes, cor anglais, 2 clarinets, bass clarinet, 2 bassoons, contrabassoon, 4 horns, 3 trumpets, 3 trombones, tuba, timpani, triangle, castanets, snare drum, maracas, tambourine, tenor drum, cymbals, bass drum, tamtam, glockenspiel, xylophone, wood block, tubular bells, piano, harp, celesta, and strings.

== Sequence of numbers ==
Act I

No 1 Introduction
No 2 Shawl Dance
No 3 Cinderella
No 4 The Father
No 5 The Fairy Godmother
No 6 The Sisters' New Clothes
No 7 The Dancing Lesson
No 8 Departure of the Stepmother and the Two Stepsisters for the Ball
No 9 Cinderella Dreams of the Ball
No 10 Gavotte
No 11 Second Appearance of the Fairy Godmother
No 12 Spring Fairy
No 13 Summer Fairy
No 14 Grasshoppers and Dragonflies
No 15 Autumn Fairy
No 16 Winter Fairy
No 17 The Interrupted Departure
No 18 The Clock
No 19 Cinderella's Departure for the Ball

Act II

No 20 Dance of the Courtiers
No 21 Passepied
No 22 Bourrée
No 23 Skinny's Variation
No 24 Dumpy's Variation
No 25 Dance of the Courtiers (Reprise)
No 26 Mazurka and Entrance of the Prince
No 27 Dance of the Prince's Four Companions
No 28 Mazurka
No 29 Cinderella's Arrival at the Ball
No 30 Grand Waltz
No 31 Promenade
No 32 Cinderella's Dance
No 33 Dance of the Prince
No 34 Refreshments for the Guests (musical quote from the 1919 opera The Love for Three Oranges)
No 35 Duet of the Two Stepsisters with the Oranges
No 36 Duet of the Prince and Cinderella
No 37 Waltz-Coda
No 38 Midnight

Act III, Scene 1

The search for Cinderella

No 39 The Prince and the Cobblers
No 40 First Galop of the Prince
No 41 Temptation
No 42 Second Galop of the Prince
No 43 Orientalia
No 44 Third Galop of the Prince

Act III, Scene 2

The Prince with Cinderella

No 45 Cinderella's Awakening
No 46 The Morning After the Ball
No 47 The Prince's Visit
No 48 The Prince Recognizes Cinderella
No 49 Slow Waltz
No 50 Amoroso

== Piano suites ==
Music from the ballet, published before its première

- Three Pieces from Cinderella, Op. 95 (1942)
- Ten Pieces from Cinderella, Op. 97 (1943)
- Six Pieces from Cinderella, Op. 102 (1944)

== Orchestral suites ==
Extracts from Cinderella authorized by the composer

- Suite No. 1 from Cinderella, Op. 107
- Suite No. 2 from Cinderella, Op. 108
- Suite No. 3 from Cinderella, Op. 109
- Waltz Suite, Op. 110

== See also ==
- List of ballets by title
- Cinderella (Ashton), the 1948 production of this ballet
- Cinderella (Fitinhof-Schell)
