= Piano-Rag-Music (Bolender) =

Piano–Rag–Music is a ballet made by Todd Bolender to Stravinsky's eponymous music from 1919. The premiere took place on June 23, 1972, as part of New York City Ballet's Stravinsky Festival at the New York State Theater, Lincoln Center.

== Original cast ==
- Gloria Govrin
- John Clifford
