= Andantino (ballet) =

Ballet choreographed by Jerome Robbins

- Choreographer: Jerome Robbins
- Music: Pyotr Ilyich Tchaikovsky
- Premiere: June 4, 1981; New York State Theater
- Original ballet company: New York City Ballet
- Design: Ben Benson; Ronald Bates
- Created for: Darci Kistler; Ib Andersen
- Genre: Neoclassical ballet

Andantino, originally titled Pas de Deux, is a ballet choreographed by Jerome Robbins to the second movement of Tchaikovsky's Piano Concerto No. 1. The ballet was made for the New York City Ballet's Tchaikovsky Festival, and premiered on June 4, 1981, at the New York State Theater, originated by Darci Kistler and Ib Andersen.

== Choreography ==
Andantino is a pas de deux set to the second movement of Tchaikovsky's Piano Concerto No. 1. It does not follow the structure of a classical pas de deux, and has neither solos nor the coda. New York Times critic Anna Kisselgoff and writer Amanda Vaill both compared its choreography to figure skating. Kisselgoff also commented, "There's more than a hint of a romantic relationship and embraces."

== Production ==
Andantino was created for the New York City Ballet's Tchaikovsky Festival, and was Robbins' first ballet to Tchaikovsky's music. The festival was conceived by George Balanchine. Robbins, however, was not interested in choreographing to Tchaikovsky's works. He nevertheless choreographed three ballets for the festival. He later recalled, "Two months before the Tchaikovsky festival, I thought, I don't like Tchaikovsky ... Why should I do Tchaikovsky? Because Mr. Balanchine wants me to do Tchaikovsky? But you don't necessarily have to enjoy doing something for it to be good."

The ballet was created on Darci Kistler, a fifteen-year-old who was just handpicked by Balanchine to join the company from the School of American Ballet, and Ib Andersen, a new principal dancer who was previously a member of the Royal Danish Ballet. The costumes were designed by Ben Benson. The lighting was designed by Ronald Bates, who was also the stage manager.

Andantino was among the ballets performed on the opening night of the Tchaikovsky Festival. Robbins had planned Andantino for a "special place in the program", but found out it would be included on that day through the presentation order, which was changed by Balanchine. It resulted in the only serious clash between Robbins and Balanchine, though Balanchine apologized the following day. It premiered under the title Pas de Deux, but was renamed to its current title later that year.

== Performances ==
Andantino premiered on June 4, 1981, at the New York State Theater. It was included in New York City Ballet's Jerome Robbins Celebration, held in honor of the 90th anniversary of Robbins' birth and 10th anniversary of his death. In 2018, for Robbins' centenary, it was performed by New York City Ballet members at Jacob's Pillow Dance Festival.

== Critical reception ==
Following the premiere, Anna Kisselgoff of The New York Times commented that although the ballet was Robbins' first ballet to Tchaikovsky's music, he "managed to create a major work in the process."
