= Stabat Mater (disambiguation) =

Stabat Mater is a 13th-century Catholic hymn to Mary's suffering as Jesus Christ's mother at his crucifixion.

Stabat Mater may also refer to:

== Musical arrangements for the hymn ==
- Stabat Mater (Boccherini), by Luigi Boccherini
- Stabat Mater (Dvořák), by Antonin Dvořák
- Stabat Mater (Haydn), by Joseph Haydn
- Stabat Mater (Jenkins), by Karl Jenkins
- Stabat Mater doloroso, part XII of the oratorio Christus (Liszt) by Franz Liszt
- Stabat Mater (Palestrina), Giovanni Pierliugi Palestrina
- Stabat Mater (Pärt), by Arvo Pärt
- Stabat Mater (Pergolesi), by Giovanni Battista Pergolesi
- Stabat Mater (Poulenc), by Francis Poulenc
- Stabat Mater (Rossini), by Gioachino Rossini
- Stabat Mater (Scarlatti), by Alessandro Scarlatti
- Stabat Mater in F minor (Schubert), by Franz Schubert
- Stabat Mater in G minor (Schubert), by Franz Schubert
- Stabat Mater, by Agostino Steffani
- Stabat Mater (Szymanowski), by Karol Szymanowski
- Stabat Mater (Vivaldi), by Antonio Vivaldi

== Other uses ==
- Stabat Mater (album), a studio album by Stefano Lentini
- Stabat Mater (art), artistic representations of that scene
- Stabat Mater (ballet), a ballet by Peter Martins
- Stabat Mater (band), in the funeral doom genre
- Stabat Mater (novel), 2008 novel by Tiziano Scarpa
- Stabat Mater (Kristeva), an essay by Julia Kristeva
- Stabat Mater speciosa, a hymn about the Nativity
- Stabat Mater speciosa, part III of the oratorio Christus (Liszt) by Franz Liszt

== See also ==
- Stata Mater, an ancient Roman goddess
