= Kathryn Morgan =

American ballet dancer

- Born: Fayetteville, North Carolina, U.S.
- Education: School of American Ballet
- Occupation: Ballet dancer
- Years active: 2006–present
- Spouses: Eric Young (m. 2017; div. 2018) Christopher Sellars (m. 2022; div. 2026)
- Dancing career
- Former groups: New York City Ballet; Miami City Ballet
- Website: www.kathrynmorganonline.com

Kathryn Elizabeth Morgan is an American ballet dancer. She joined New York City Ballet in 2006 and was promoted to the rank of soloist in 2009. Morgan left New York City Ballet in 2012 due to health complications related to her suffering from Hashimoto's thyroiditis. Throughout her recovery, Morgan taught ballet and performed as a guest artist. From 2019 to 2020, she was a soloist at Miami City Ballet.

== Early life ==
Kathryn Elizabeth Morgan was born on August 17, 1988, in Fayetteville, North Carolina. She was adopted. Her adoptive father was an endodontic dentist serving in the Air Force and the family moved to the Minot Air Force Base in Minot, North Dakota. She began studying ballet, tap and jazz dance when she was two years old. When she was five years old, her family moved from North Dakota to Mobile, Alabama, and she enrolled in the school at Mobile Ballet, deciding to focus only on ballet training. When she was nine years old, Morgan went with her family to New York City and saw the New York City Ballet perform George Balanchine's The Nutcracker, inspiring her to work towards dancing with the company. At age eleven, Morgan was accepted into the regional youth company of Mobile Ballet, where she performed in full-length ballets including Swan Lake, Sleeping Beauty and The Nutcracker, the latter in which she performed the roles of Clara at age thirteen and Arabian and Snow Queen at age fifteen. In 2004, at the age of fifteen, she attended the summer program at the School of American Ballet in New York City and in the fall, she enrolled as a full-time student. Morgan's mother rented an apartment in New York City and stayed there with her, while her father commuted up to New York from Alabama every other weekend.

== Career ==
In June 2006, at the age of seventeen, Morgan joined the New York City Ballet as an apprentice. Her first solo performance with the company was as Juliet in Peter Martins' Romeo + Juliet in 2007. In February 2007, she became a member of the company's corps de ballet. She was promoted to the rank of soloist in October 2009. In 2010, Morgan faced serious health issues due to an underfunctioning thyroid and left New York City Ballet in 2012 to focus on her recovery. Her illness had caused her to gain weight excessively, suffer from fatigue, lose muscle strength, lose hair and suffer from depression. Morgan was later diagnosed with Hashimoto's thyroiditis. She moved back to her hometown of Mobile, Alabama, to receive treatment. Since 2014, Morgan has returned to the stage performing as a guest artist with ballet companies across the United States, Europe and Asia. She has been featured in Dance Magazine, Pointe, Dance Spirit Magazine and Teen Vogue. She also teaches dance classes, has created her own mobile app, has a podcast on iTunes presented through the Premier Dance Network, does public speaking and has a blog. Morgan's YouTube channel, which focuses on body positivity, healthy lifestyle habits, makeup tutorials and dance tips, has over 300,000 subscribers.

=== New York City Ballet ===
Morgan danced with New York City Ballet for six years, from 2006 to 2012. She was a soloist from 2009 until her departure from the company. While with New York City Ballet, Morgan performed many featured roles. She performed as Marzipan, Dewdrop and Sugar Plum Fairy in George Balanchine's The Nutcracker. She also performed in other Balanchine works, including Ballo della Regina, the Waltz in Coppélia, Divertimento No. 15, Stars and Stripes, Scotch Symphony, La Valse (Balanchine) and Western Symphony. While Christopher Wheeldon was working with NYCB, Morgan performed in three of his ballets: Carousel (A Dance) and Scènes de ballet in 2006, and Mercurial Manoeuvres in 2009. Also in 2009, Morgan performed in Jerome Robbins' 2 and 3 Part Inventions, Dances at a Gathering, The Four Seasons as Winter, Les Noces and West Side Story Suite as Maria. Morgan performed the pas de deux from August Bournonville's Flower Festival in Genzano. She performed in Sean Lavery's Romeo and Juliet as Juliet Capulet. She performed in Peter Martins' Mirage, Romeo + Juliet as Juliet in 2007, The Sleeping Beauty as Jewel and Princess Aurora, Stabat Mater, and in the pas de trois and pas de quatre of Swan Lake. In 2010, Morgan performed in Benjamin Millepied's Why am I not where you are and 28 Variations on a Theme by Paganini.

=== Principal guest roles ===
After leaving New York City Ballet and recovering from her underfunctioning thyroid, Morgan has toured and performed with various ballet companies as a guest artist. With Mobile Ballet in Alabama, Morgan performed as Aurora in Sleeping Beauty, Odette and Odile in Swan Lake, Sugar Plum Fairy in The Nutcracker and Snow White in Snow White and the Seven Dwarfs. She performed in George Balanchine's Who Cares? at the Odeon of Herodes Atticus in Athens, Greece, in Divertimento No. 15 and Carousel (A Dance) at the Opéra Bastille in Paris, in Les Noces at Santander & Majorca in Spain, in Carousel (A Dance) and West Side Story Suite as Maria at the Orchard Hall at Bunkamura in Tokyo, and in The Red Shoes, Kitri in Don Quixote and Odile in Swan Lake at the Playhouse Square in Cleveland, Ohio.

Morgan also performed with Dancing in the Dark Productions as the lead role of Galina in To Dance the Musical.

In March 2016, through the Cleveland-based program Ballet in the City, Morgan performed a two-night show sponsored by Bloch titled Bloch's Evening With Kathryn Morgan at the John F. Kennedy Center for the Performing Arts in Washington, D.C.

=== Miami City Ballet ===
In February 2019, Morgan contacted Lourdes Lopez, the artistic director of Miami City Ballet, about the possibility of joining the company. On 17 April 2019, Miami City Ballet announced in a press release that Morgan would be joining the company as a soloist. Upon joining the company, she began rehearsing for the title role in Balanchine and Jerome Robbins' The Firebird, the role of Mercedes in Don Quixote, the role of Striptease Girl in Slaughter on Tenth Avenue, the roles of Sugar Plum Fairy, Dewdrop, Spanish and Demi Flowers in The Nutcracker, the Strangers in the Night Pas de Deux from Nine Sinatra Songs, and roles in Stravinsky Violin Concerto and I'm Old Fashioned. She was removed from the casting of Stravinsky Violin Concerto before the first performance. In October 2019, Morgan made her debut at Miami City Ballet, performing Slaughter on Tenth Avenue.

Morgan had been told, upon signing her contract with the company, that she would be dancing the Bitter Earth Pas de Deux from Five Movements, Three Repeats and Tschaikovsky Pas de Deux, and she was fitted for costumes for both roles, but she was not called to rehearsals. During The Nutcracker rehearsals, Morgan pulled a calf muscle and sat out of the performances. In the second program of the season, Morgan performed in I'm Old Fashioned. In the middle of the season, Morgan was removed from the casting list for The Firebird due to her weight. Morgan was told by the artistic staff that, as a size 2, she was an "embarrassment" and "would not represent the company well" dancing in The Firebird. Morgan was then removed from the casting of Nine Sinatra Songs two days before the show. She was scheduled to perform in Don Quixote, but the season was interrupted by the COVID-19 pandemic in the United States.

At the end of the 2019–2020 season, Morgan left Miami City Ballet for mental and physical health reasons. On October 8, 2020, she released a video on YouTube explaining why she had chosen to leave the company.

=== Awards ===
- 2006 Mae L. Wien Award
- 2006 Movado Future Legends Award
- 2009 Janice Levin Award

== Personal life ==
Along with ballet, Morgan is classically trained in piano.

On May 27, 2016, Morgan became engaged to Eric Young in North Carolina. They were married on May 27, 2017, at Ashland Place United Methodist Church in Mobile, Alabama. After their wedding, Morgan and Young moved to Houston, Texas, and she began teaching ballet at the Royal Academy of Fine Arts. On September 3, 2018, Morgan announced on Instagram that she and Young were no longer married. Later that month, she announced via YouTube that her divorce had been finalized.

In December 2017, Morgan addressed the sexual assault allegations made against Peter Martins, stating that she had never been a victim of abuse by Martins and was treated respectfully while at New York City Ballet but had heard rumors about Martins having sexual relationships with dancers in the company.

After leaving Miami City Ballet in 2020, Morgan began living in Salt Lake City with her then-boyfriend, Christopher Sellars, a former first soloist with Ballet West. On July 29, 2021, Morgan became engaged to Sellars, after two years of dating. He proposed to her at Disneyland. On September 24, 2022, Morgan and Sellars were married. On August 27, 2024, they adopted a lab terrier mix named Finn. On August 16, 2026, she announced on her Instagram page that she and Sellars had divorced and that she was no longer affiliated with the school owned and operated by Sellars and his family, The Dance Academy of Southern California.
