= Noël Quillerier =

French painter

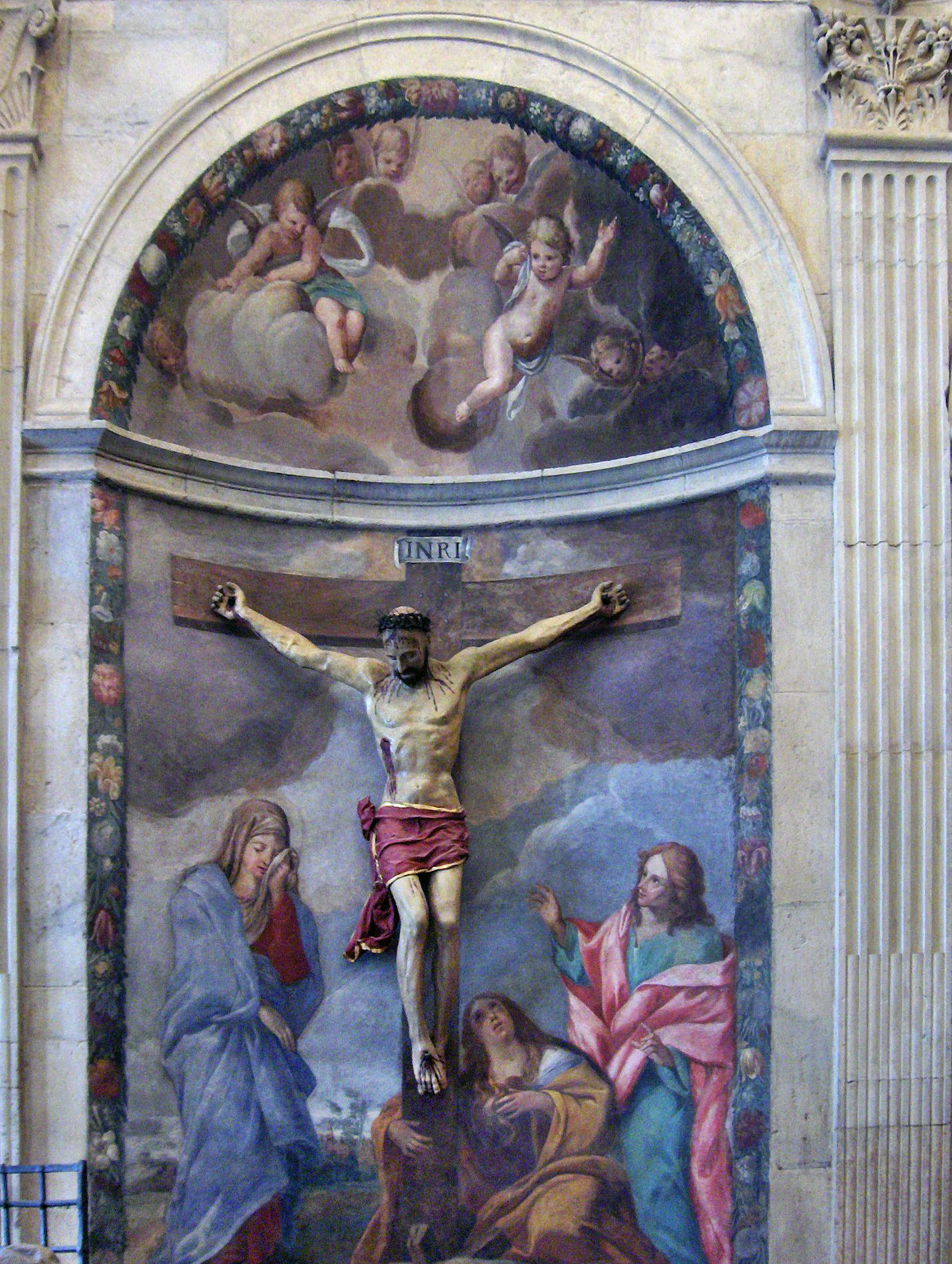
Stabat Mater painting and Crucifix by Quillerier at Oratorio della Nunziatella, 1625–1626.

Noël Quillerier (1594 (baptised August 1) - April 3, 1669) was a French painter who also served as a valet de chambre for the king. A native of Orléans, in 1631 he married Charlotte Lerambert, the sister of sculptor Louis Lerambert. Their daughter Marguerite married the sculptor Antoine Coysevox; their son Jérôme (sometimes called Hiérosme), baptized February 19, 1639, was also listed as a painter, though none of his works are known to have survived. Among Quillerier's pupils was Noël Coypel. He died in Paris.

== Works ==
- Saint Paul, oil on panel (118x90 cm), Musée des beaux-arts de Nancy, once attributed to Phillip of Champagne.
- Saint Paul in Meditation, oil in panel (131x97 cm), Louvre, Paris

== Bibliography ==
- Saint Paul in Meditation, at the Louvre
