= Oratory of Nunziatella, Foligno =

Building in Umbria, Italy

Coordinates: 42°57′22″N 12°42′18″E

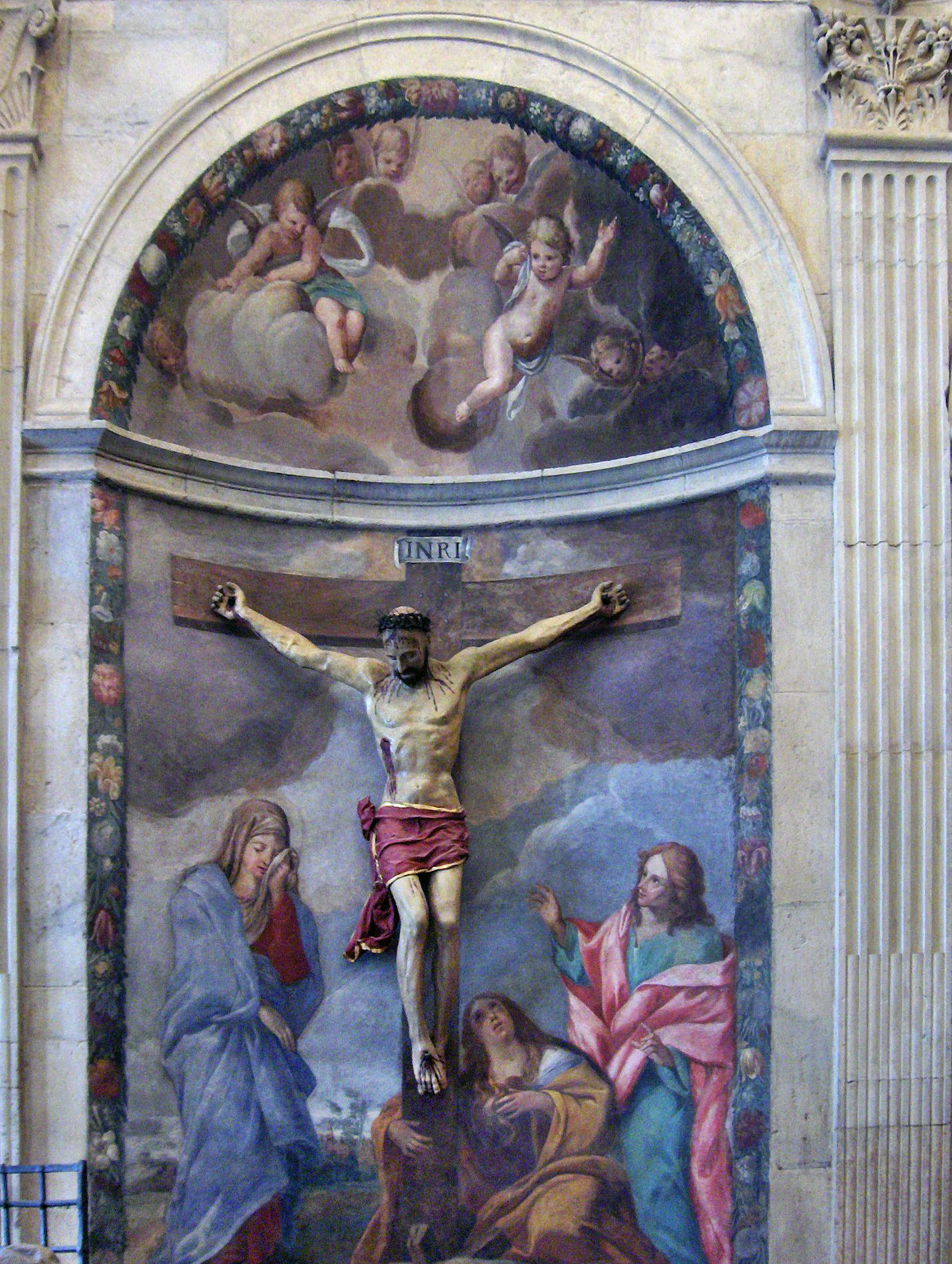
Stabat Mater painting and Crucifix at the oratory, by Noël Quillerier, 1625-1626

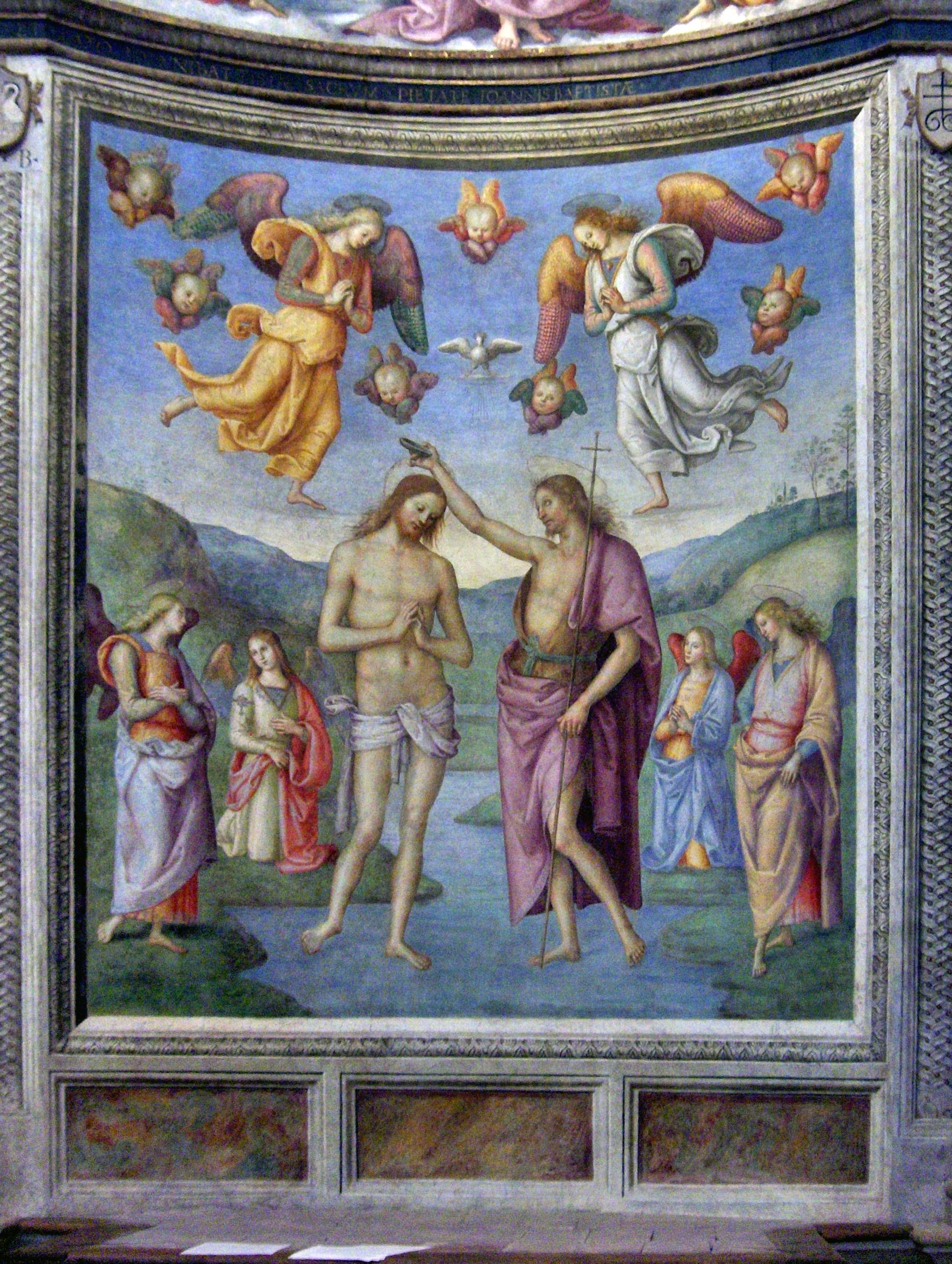
Baptism of Christ by Perugino

The Oratorio della Nunziatella is a 15th-century Renaissance-style oratory in Foligno, region of Umbria, Italy.

The oratory is located near the 18th-century Chiesa del Suffragio and is named after the Virgin of the Annunciation, considered in those days to be the patron saint of the city. It was restored in the 19th century. Among the decorations is the prominent fresco of the Baptism of Jesus painted between 1497 and 1507 by Pietro Perugino.

== Sources ==
- Hospitalia
