= Why am I not where you are =

Why am I not where you are is a ballet commissioned by New York City Ballet, choreographed by principal dancer Benjamin Millepied to a likewise commissioned score by French composer Thierry Escaich, The Lost Dancer.

It was the choreographer's second ballet for City Ballet; the premiere took place on Thursday, April 29, 2010, at the David H. Koch Theater, Lincoln Center. The costumes were designed by Marc Happel and the set by Santiago Calatrava as part of the company's Architecture of Dance Festival.

== Original cast ==
- Kathryn Morgan
- Sara Mearns
- Sean Suozzi
- Amar Ramasar

== Reviews ==
- NY Times by Alastair Macaulay, May 1, 2010
- NY Times by Anthony Tommasini, June 11, 2010
- NY Times by Alastair Macaulay, July 2, 2010
- NY Times by Gia Kourlas, September 28, 2010
