= Louis Lerambert =

French sculptor

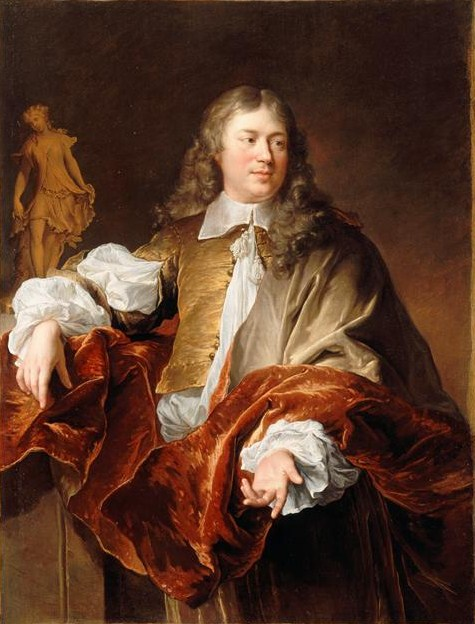
Portrait by Alexis Simon Belle, 1704

Louis Lerambert (1620 — 15 June 1670) was a French sculptor in a Parisian family that included four generations of court artists. who in 1637 inherited the court position caring for the Antiquities and Marbles of the King, which had become hereditary in his family. He trained in the atelier of Simon Vouet, recently returned from Rome; there he met the sculptor Jacques Sarazin.

Louis Lerambert received court commissions under King Louis XIII and his successor King Louis XIV in the three current sculptural genres, overmantels and decorative sculpture, portrait busts and tomb figures. Lerambert was received into the Académie royale de peinture et de sculpture in 1664. Among the few surviving examples of his non-royal works are stucco decorations in the chapel at the château de Bonnes (later Chamarande), Essonne, executed ca 1660 for the royal secretary Pierre Mérault; allegorical bas-reliefs of Memory and Meditation for the tomb of Jean Courtin and his wife in Saint-Solenne, Blois, (1660); and holy water stoup of conjoined putti's heads at St-Germain-l'Auxerrois, Paris.

== At Versailles ==
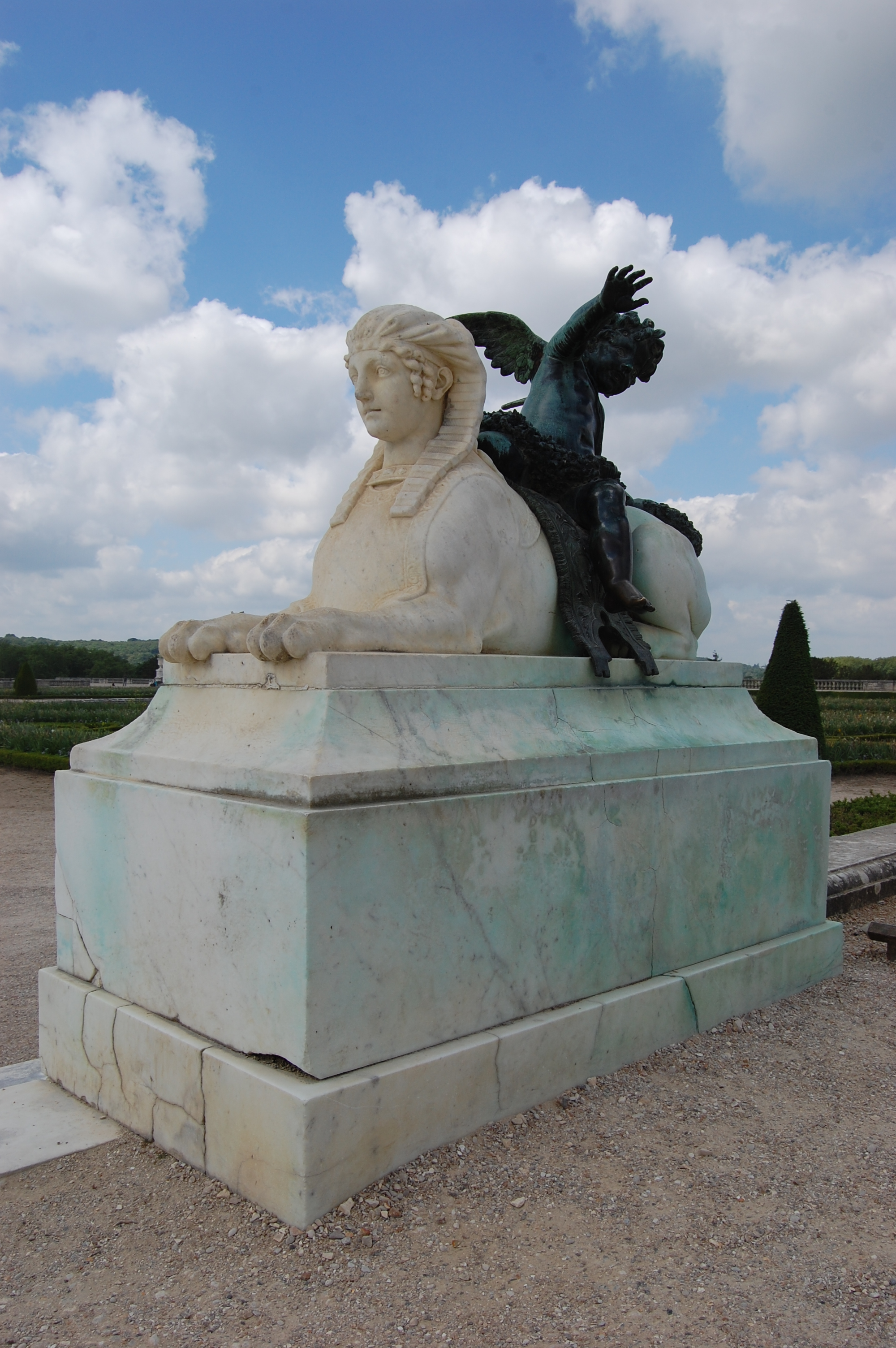
L’Amour porté par un sphinx by Jacques Houzeau, Louis Lerambert and Jacques Sarrazin, parterre du midi, château de Versailles

He was among the first generation of sculptors providing sculpture for the château of Versailles, notably for the rustic comedies in stone of the "Petite Commande" of 1664, much of which was eliminated in later, grander garden projects and is known only through the meticulously kept records of the Bâtiments du Roi and the engravings of Jean Le Pautre. Among his works still at Versailles are a pair of marble sphinxes on the Parterre des Fleurs (1667–8), carved in collaboration with Jacques Houzeau following a model provided by Jacques Sarazin, and six of the fountain basins supported with trios of playing putti, musician, child term figures for the Parterre d’Eau. Antoine Coysevox, who married his niece, was his most prominent pupil.

Lerambert's sister married the painter Noël Quillerier.
