= Stabat Mater (Kristeva) =

Stabat Mater (original French title "Hérethique de l'amour") is an essay by philosopher and critic Julia Kristeva. First published in French in Tel Quel (1977), it was translated into English by Arthur Goldhammer and published in Poetics Today (1985), and translated again by Leon S. Roudiez for The Kristeva Reader (ed. Toril Moi, Columbia UP, 1986).

The essay's title derives from Stabat Mater, the 13th-century Catholic hymn to Mary; Kristeva's childhood, she said, was "bathed" in the liturgy of the Orthodox Church.

The essay is experimental, and (in two columns) combines a scholarly investigation of the cult of the Virgin Mary and of "the maternal" symbolized by the Virgin with a personal account of Kristeva's "bodily and psychic experiences surrounding and including the birth of her son".
