= St Luke Passion (Penderecki) =

1966 oratorio by Krzysztof Penderecki

- by Krzysztof Penderecki
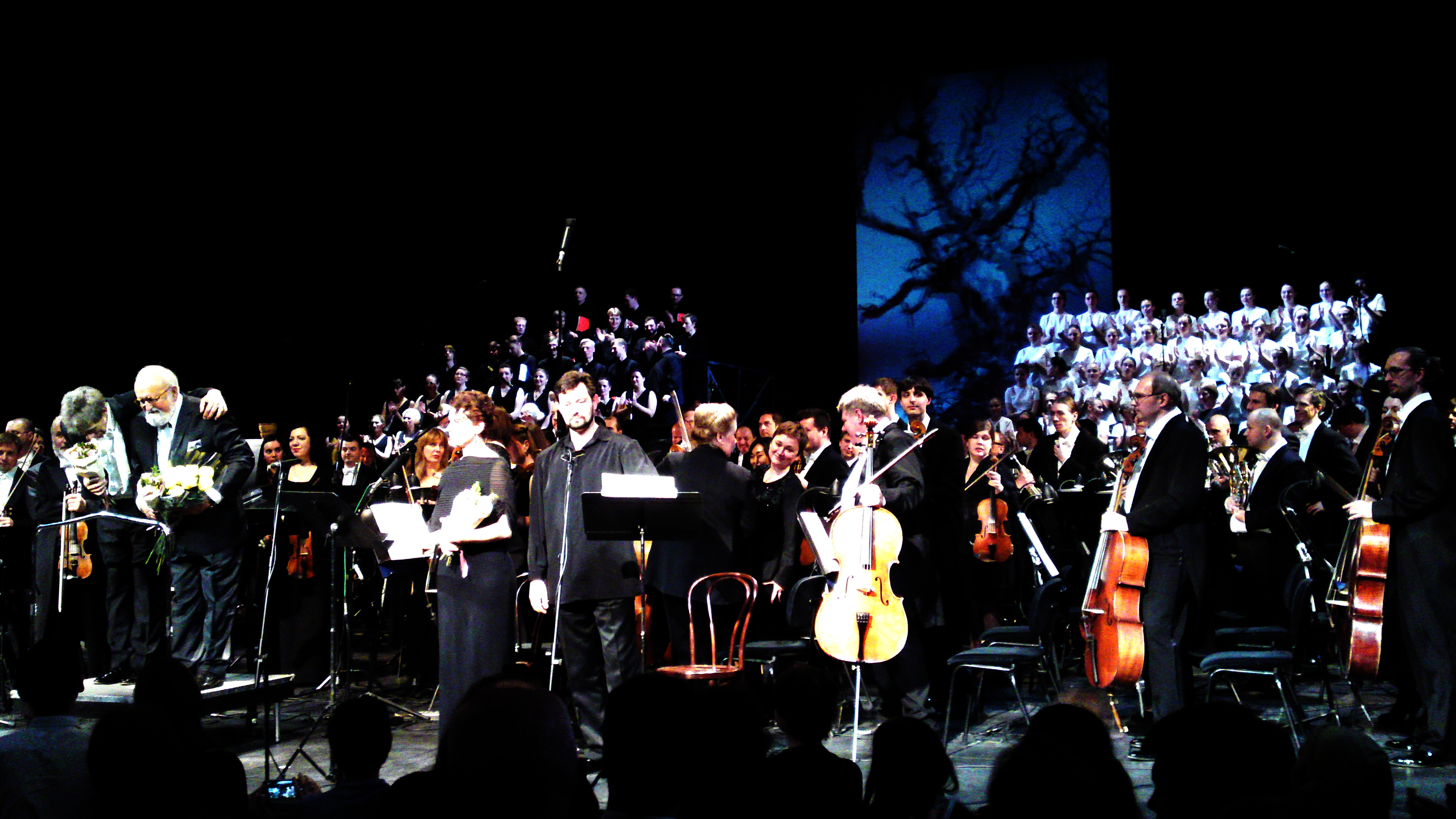
- Performance at the Novaya Opera Theatre, Moscow, in 2016
- English: Passion and Death of Our Lord Jesus Christ According to St Luke
- Full title: Passio et mors Domini nostri Jesu Christi secundum Lucam
- Text: from Gospel of Luke; Stabat Mater; hymns; psalms; Lamentations
- Language: Latin
- Performed: 30 March 1966
- Scoring: narrator; soprano; baritone; bass; three choirs; children's choir; orchestra

The St Luke Passion (full title: Passio et mors Domini nostri Jesu Christi secundum Lucam, or the Passion and Death of Our Lord Jesus Christ According to St Luke) is a work for chorus and orchestra written in 1966 by Polish composer Krzysztof Penderecki. He composed the work to commemorate a millennium of Polish Christianity following the baptism and conversion of Polish duke Mieszko I in 966 AD. Penderecki's setting is one of several musical settings of the Passion story and contains text from the Gospel of Luke as well as other sources such as the Stabat Mater.

Despite the Passion's almost total atonality and use of avant-garde musical techniques, the musical public appreciated the work's stark power and direct emotional impact and the piece was performed several more times soon after its premiere on 30 March 1966.

== Musical content ==
=== Compositional techniques ===
The Passion is almost entirely atonal, except for two major triads which occur once at the end of the Stabat Mater, a cappella, and once, an E major triad, at the very end of the work with full choruses, orchestra and organ. It makes very frequent use of tone clusters, often played fortissimo by brass or organ. The contrapuntal equivalent of tone clusters is micropolyphony, which is one approach to texture that occurs in this piece (Stein 1979, 234).

Occasionally, Penderecki employs twelve-tone serialism, and utilizes the BACH motif. Moreover, David Wordsworth believes that the BACH motif unites the entire work (Wordsworth 2013, 47). The principal tone row, Cantus Firmus I, is C♯–D–F–E–E♭–F♯–G–G♯–B–B♭–A–C. The tone row of Cantus Firmus II is E–E♭–F–F♯–D–C♯–G–A♭–B♭–A–C–B. The chorus makes use of many extended techniques, including shouting, speaking, giggling and hissing.

=== Orchestration ===
The St Luke Passion is scored for large forces: a narrator (who acts as the Evangelist); soprano, baritone and bass soloists (with the baritone singing the role of Christ and the soprano and bass taking other roles as necessary); three mixed choruses and a boys' choir; and a large orchestra consisting of:

Woodwinds

4 flutes (2 doubling piccolos, 1 doubling alto flute)
1 bass clarinet in B♭
2 alto saxophones
3 bassoons
1 contrabassoon

Brass

6 horns in F
4 trumpets in B♭
4 trombones
1 tuba

Percussion

timpani (4 drums)

bass drum
6 tom-toms
2 bongos
snare drum
whip
4 wood blocks
raganella
güiro
claves
4 cymbals
2 tam-tams
2 gongs
tubular bells

vibraphone

Keyboards

piano
organ
harmonium

Strings

harp

24 violins (12 Violin I's, 12 Violin II's)
10 violas
10 violoncellos
8 double basses

== Text ==
The text of the St Luke Passion is entirely in Latin. The primary source of the text is the Gospel of Luke; however, it contains other sources such as hymns, Psalms and Lamentations.

=== Sections of text ===
The Passion is divided into two parts and twenty-seven sections, thirteen in Part I and fourteen in Part II. Their titles are as follows.

==== Part I ====
1. O Crux Ave ("O Holy Cross," from the hymn Vexilla Regis prodeunt), chorus and orchestra
2. Et egressus ibat ("And he went out," Garden of Gethsemane), narrator, baritone and orchestra
3. Deus Meus ("My God," Christ's prayer at Gethsemane, from Psalm 21), baritone, chorus and orchestra
4. Domine, quis habitat ("Lord, who shall dwell...", from Psalms 14, 4 and 15), soprano and orchestra
5. Adhuc eo loquente ("And yet while he spake," Judas's betrayal of Christ), narrator, baritone, chorus and orchestra
6. Ierusalem ("Jerusalem," from the Lamentation of Jeremiah), chorus and orchestra
7. Ut quid, Domine ("Why, Lord," from Psalm 9), chorus a cappella
8. Comprehendentes autem eum ("Then they took him," Peter's denial of Christ), narrator, soprano, bass, chorus and orchestra
9. Iudica me, Deus ("Give sentence with me, O God," from Psalm 42), bass and orchestra
10. Et viri, qui tenebant illum ("And the men that held Jesus...," mocking of Christ), narrator, baritone, chorus and orchestra
11. Ierusalem (text identical to section 6)
12. Miserere mei, Deus ("Be merciful to me, O God," from Psalm 55), chorus a cappella
13. Et surgens omnis ("And the multitude arose...," Christ's trial before Pilate and death sentence), narrator, baritone, bass, chorus and orchestra

==== Part II ====
14. Et in pulverem ("And into the dust," from Psalm 21), chorus and orchestra
15. Et baiulans sibi crucem ("And bearing his cross," the road to Calvary), narrator and orchestra
16. Popule meus ("My people," from the Improperia), chorus and orchestra
17. Ibi crucifixerunt eum ("There they crucified him," the crucifixion of Christ), narrator and orchestra
18. Crux fidelis ("O faithful cross," from Pange lingua gloriosi proelium certaminis), soprano, chorus and orchestra
19. Iesus autem dicebat ("Then said Jesus," Christ's forgiveness), narrator, baritone and orchestra
20. In pulverem mortis ("Into the dust of death," from Psalm 21), chorus a cappella
21. Et stabat populus ("And the people stood," Christ's mocking on the cross), narrator, chorus and orchestra
22. Unus autem ("And one of them...," the good and bad thieves), narrator, baritone, bass, chorus and orchestra
23. Stabant autem iuxta crucem ("Now there stood by the cross," Jesus addressing his mother and John, from the Gospel of John), narrator, baritone and orchestra
24. Stabat Mater ("The mother stood...," from the Stabat Mater sequence), chorus a cappella
25. Erat autem fere hora sexta ("And it was about the sixth hour," Christ's death account from both Luke and John), narrator, baritone, chorus and orchestra
26. Alla breve (a tempo marking in Italian indicating a quick duple meter), orchestra alone
27. In pulverem mortis... In te, Domine, speravi ("Into the dust of death...In thee, O Lord, I have put my trust" from Psalm 30), soprano, baritone, bass, chorus and orchestra

== Recordings ==
Franziska Hirzel, soprano, François Le Roux, baritone, Jean-Philippe Courtis, bass, Manfred Jung, narrator, WDR Rundfunkchor, NDR Rundfunkchor, Mainzer Domchor, Beethoven Orchester Bonn, Marc Soustrot, conductor, MDG 337 0981-2 www.mdg.de
