= Stabat Mater =

13th-century Christian hymn to Mary

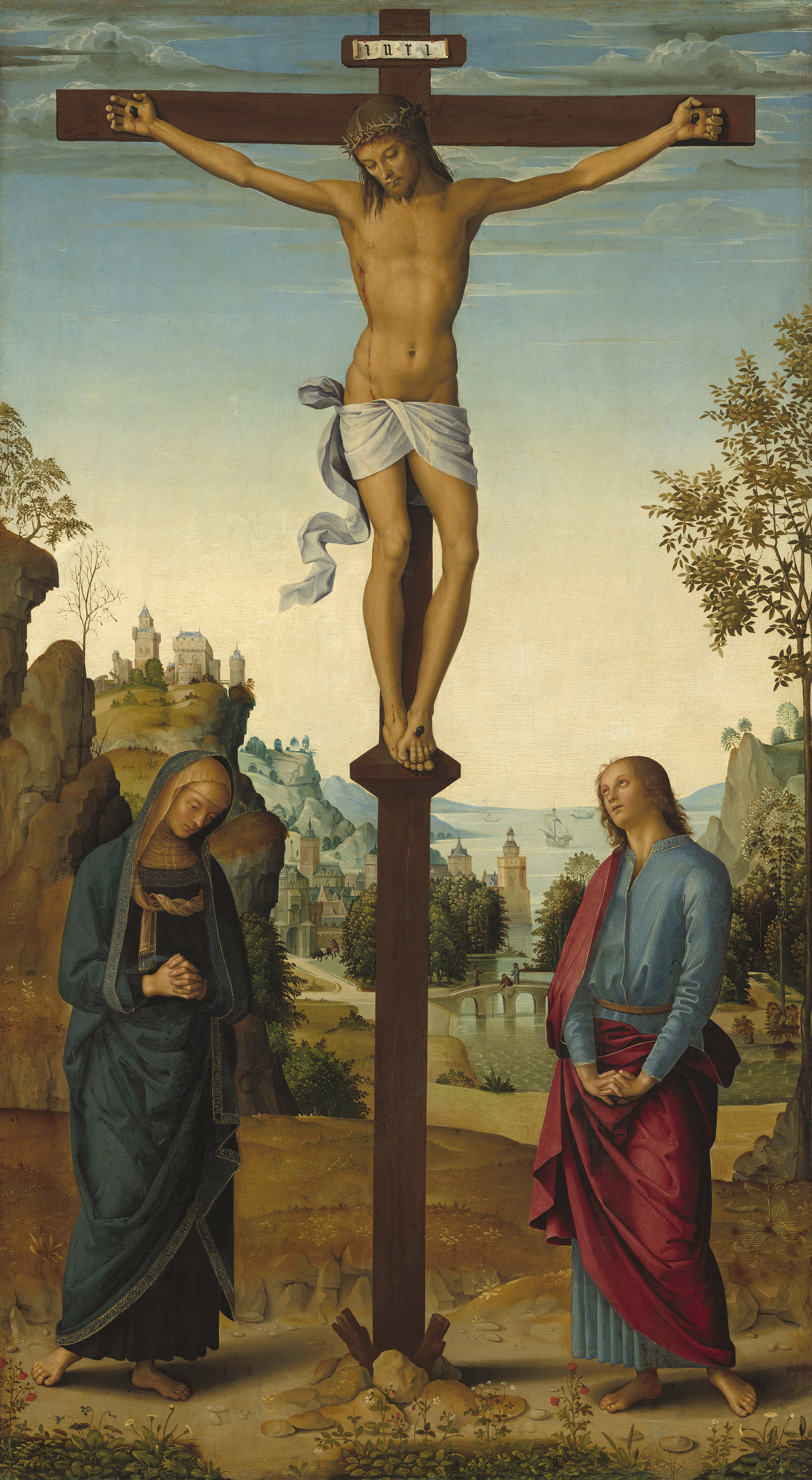
Pietro Perugino's depiction of Mary at the Cross, 1482. (National Gallery, Washington)

The Stabat Mater is a 13th-century Christian hymn to the Virgin Mary that portrays her suffering as mother during the crucifixion of her son Jesus Christ. Its author may be either the Franciscan friar Jacopone da Todi or Pope Innocent III. The title comes from its first line, "Stabat Mater dolorosa", which means "the sorrowful mother was standing".

The hymn is sung at the liturgy on the memorial of Our Lady of Sorrows. The Stabat Mater has been set to music by many Western composers.

== Date ==
The Stabat Mater has often been ascribed to Jacopone da Todi (ca. 1230–1306), but this has been strongly challenged by the discovery of the earliest notated copy of the Stabat Mater in a 13th-century gradual belonging to the Dominican nuns in Bologna (Museo Civico Medievale MS 518, fo. 200v-04r).

The Stabat Mater was well known by the end of the 14th century and Georgius Stella wrote of its use in 1388, while other historians note its use later in the same century. In Provence, about 1399, it was used during the nine days' processions.

As a liturgical sequence, the Stabat Mater was suppressed, along with hundreds of other sequences, by the Council of Trent, but restored to the missal by Pope Benedict XIII in 1727 for the Feast of the Seven Dolours of the Blessed Virgin Mary.

== Text and translation ==
The Latin text below is from an 1853 Roman Breviary and is one of multiple extant versions of the poem. The first English translation by Edward Caswall is not literal but preserves the trochaic tetrameter rhyme scheme and sense of the original text. The second English version is a more formal equivalence translation.

1. Stabat mater dolorósa
juxta Crucem lacrimósa,
dum pendébat Fílius.

2. Cujus ánimam geméntem,
contristántem et doléntem
pertransívit gládius.

3. O quam tristis et afflícta
fuit illa benedícta,
mater Unigéniti!

4. Quæ mœrébat et dolébat,
pia Mater, dum vidébat
nati pœnas ínclyti.

5. Quis est homo qui non fleret,
matrem Christi si vidéret
in tanto supplício?

6. Quis non posset contristári
Christi Matrem contemplári
doléntem cum Fílio?

7. Pro peccátis suæ gentis
vidit Jésum in torméntis,
et flagéllis súbditum.

8. Vidit suum dulcem Natum
moriéndo desolátum,
dum emísit spíritum.

9. Eja, Mater, fons amóris
me sentíre vim dolóris
fac, ut tecum lúgeam.

10. Fac, ut árdeat cor meum
in amándo Christum Deum
ut sibi compláceam.

11. Sancta Mater, istud agas,
crucifíxi fige plagas
cordi meo válide.

12. Tui Nati vulneráti,
tam dignáti pro me pati,
pœnas mecum dívide.

13. Fac me tecum pie flere,
crucifíxo condolére,
donec ego víxero.

14. Juxta Crucem tecum stare,
et me tibi sociáre
in planctu desídero.

15. Virgo vírginum præclára,
mihi iam non sis amára,
fac me tecum plángere.

16. Fac ut portem Christi mortem,
passiónis fac consórtem,
et plagas recólere.

17. Fac me plagis vulnerári,
fac me Cruce inebriári,
et cruóre Fílii.

18. Flammis ne urar succénsus,
per te, Virgo, sim defénsus
in die judícii.

19. Christe, cum sit hinc exire,
da per Matrem me veníre
ad palmam victóriæ.

20. Quando corpus moriétur,
fac, ut ánimæ donétur
paradísi glória.

Amen.

At the Cross her station keeping,
Stood the mournful Mother weeping,
Close to Jesus to the last:

Through her heart, his sorrow sharing,
All his bitter anguish bearing,
now at length the sword has pass'd.

Oh, how sad and sore distress'd
Was that Mother highly blest
Of the sole-begotten One!

Christ above in torment hangs;
She beneath beholds the pangs
Of her dying glorious Son.

Is there one who would not weep,
Whelm'd in miseries so deep,
Christ's dear Mother to behold?

Can the human heart refrain
From partaking in her pain,
In that Mother's pain untold?

Bruis'd, derided, curs'd, defil'd,
She beheld her tender Child
All with bloody scourges rent;

For the sins of his own nation,
Saw Him hang in desolation,
Till His Spirit forth He sent.

O thou Mother! fount of love!
Touch my spirit from above,
Make my heart with thine accord:

Make me feel as thou hast felt;
Make my soul to glow and melt
With the love of Christ my Lord.

Holy Mother! pierce me through;
In my heart each wound renew
Of my Saviour crucified:

Let me share with thee His pain,
Who for all my sins was slain,
Who for me in torments died.

Let me mingle tears with thee,
Mourning Him who mourn'd for me,
All the days that I may live:

By the Cross with thee to stay;
There with thee to weep and pray;
Is all I ask of thee to give.

Virgin of all virgins blest!,
Listen to my fond request:
Let me share thy grief divine;

Let me, to my latest breath,
In my body bear the death
Of that dying Son of thine.

Wounded with his every wound,
Steep my soul till it hath swoon'd,
In His very blood away;

Be to me, O Virgin, nigh,
Lest in flames I burn and die,
In his awful Judgment day.

Christ, when Thou shalt call me hence,
Be Thy Mother my defence,
Be Thy Cross my victory;

While my body here decays,
May my soul thy goodness praise,
Safe in Paradise with Thee.

– Translation by Edward Caswall

The sorrowful mother was standing
beside the Cross weeping,
while her Son was hanging.

Whose moaning soul,
depressed and grieving,
the sword has passed through.

O how sad and stricken
was that blessed [woman],
mother of the Only-begotten!

Who was mourning and suffering,
the pious Mother, while she was watching
the punishments of the glorious son.

Who is the person who would not weep,
if he had seen the mother of Christ
in such great suffering?

Who would not be able to be saddened
to behold the Mother of Christ
grieving with the Son?

For the sins of his people
she saw Jesus in torments,
and subjected to lashes.

She saw her sweet Son
dying forsaken,
while he sent forth [his] spirit.

Come now, Mother, fountain of love
Make me feel the power of sorrow
that I might mourn with you.

Grant that my heart may burn
in loving Christ the God
that I might please him.

Holy Mother, may you do that,
fix the wounds of the crucified
mightily in my heart.

Of your wounded son,
[who] so deigned to suffer for me,
Share [his] penalties with me.

Make me cry dutifully with you,
to suffer with the crucified,
as long as I shall have lived.

To stand by the Cross with you,
to unite me to you
in weeping [this] I desire.

Noble Virgin of virgins,
Be not bitter with me now,
Make me mourn with you.

Grant that I might bear the death of Christ,
Make [me] kindred in the passion,
and contemplate the wounds.

Make me injured by the wounds,
make me drunken by the Cross,
and by the blood of the Son.

Lest I be consumed burned by flames,
through you, Virgin, may I be defended
on the day of judgement.

Christ, when it is time to depart hence,
grant me to come through the Mother,
to the palm of victory.

When the body will decay,
grant that it may be bestowed on [my] soul
the glory of paradise.

Amen.

== Indulgence ==
To the Stabat mater was attributed the indulgence of 100 days each time it was recited.

== Musical settings ==
Composers who have written settings of the Stabat Mater include:

- Josquin des Prez
- John Browne (composer)
- Richard Davy
- William Cornysh
- Orlande de Lassus (1585)
- Giovanni Pierluigi da Palestrina: Stabat Mater (c.1590)
- Giovanni Felice Sances (1643)
- Marc-Antoine Charpentier H.15 & H.387 (1685–90)
- Louis-Nicolas Clérambault C. 70 (17..)
- Sébastien de Brossard SdB.8 (1702)
- Emanuele d'Astorga (1707)
- Antonio Vivaldi: Stabat Mater (1712)
- Domenico Scarlatti (1715)
- Nicola Fago (1719)
- Alessandro Scarlatti: Stabat Mater (1723)
- Antonio Caldara (c.1725)
- Agostino Steffani (1727)
- František Tůma (1704-1774) (5 different settings)
- Giovanni Battista Pergolesi: Stabat Mater (1736)
- Nicola Logroscino (1760)
- Florian Leopold Gassmann (c.1765)
- Joseph Haydn: Stabat Mater (1767)
- Giuseppe Tartini (1769)
- Tommaso Traetta (1770)
- Antonio Soler (1775)
- Luigi Boccherini: Stabat Mater (1781, 1801)
- Franz Ignaz Beck (1782)
- Pasquale Cafaro (1784)
- Franz Schubert: Stabat Mater in G minor (1815) and Stabat Mater in F minor (1816)
- Juan Crisóstomo Arriaga (1821?)
- Gioacchino Rossini: Stabat Mater (1831–1841)
- Peter Cornelius (1849)
- Franz Liszt: part of the oratorio Christus (1862–1866)
- Antonin Dvořák: Stabat Mater (1876–1877)
- Laura Netzel (1890)
- Josef Bohuslav Foerster: Op. 56 (1891–1892)
- František Musil: Op. 50 (1893)
- Giuseppe Verdi (1897)
- Charles Villiers Stanford (1906)
- Toivo Kuula (1919)
- George Oldroyd (1922)
- Karol Szymanowski: Stabat Mater (1925–1926)
- Johann Nepomuk David (1927)
- Lennox Berkeley (1947)
- Julia Perry (1947)
- Francis Poulenc: Stabat Mater (1950)
- Herbert Howells (1965)
- Krzysztof Penderecki: in St Luke Passion (1963–1966)
- Arvo Pärt: Stabat Mater (1985)
- Knut Nystedt (1986)
- Amaral Vieira (1988)
- Trond Kverno (1991)
- Pawel Lukaszewski (1994)
- Vladimir Martynov (1994)
- Christian Hildebrandt (1994)
- Salvador Brotons (1997)
- Frank Ferko (1999)
- Vladimír Godár (2001)
- Bruno Coulais (2005)
- Philipp Ortmeier (2007/08)
- Karl Jenkins: Stabat Mater (2008)
- Paul Mealor (2009, revised 2010)
- Metropolitan Hilarion (2011)
- Franco Simone (2014)
- James MacMillan (2015)
- Vache Sharafyan

Most settings are in Latin. Karol Szymanowski's setting is in Polish, although it may also be sung in Latin. George Oldroyd's setting is in Latin with an English translation for Anglican and Episcopalian use.

== See also ==
- Catholic Mariology
