= Stabat Mater (art) =

Representation of the Crucifixion of Jesus

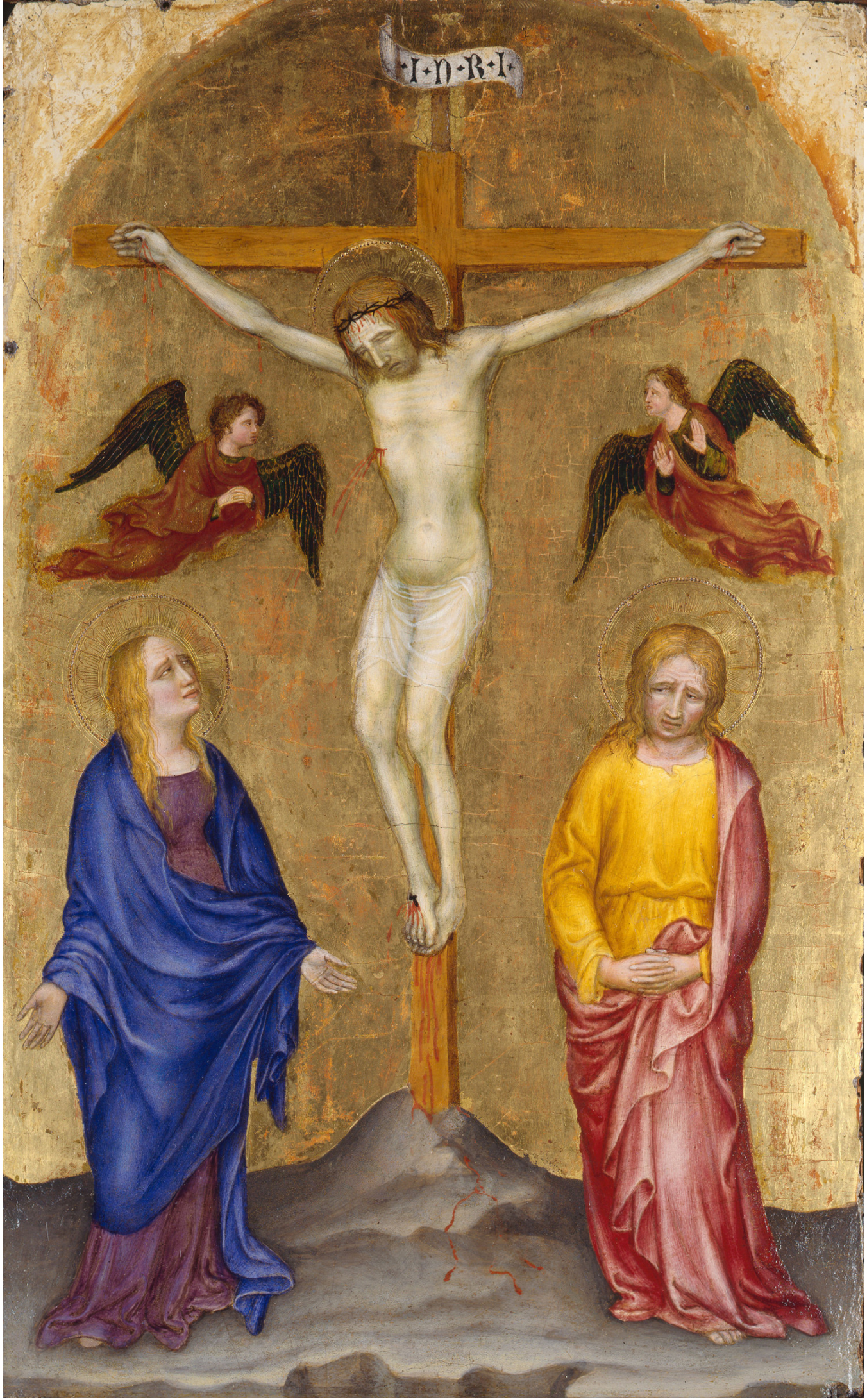
Gentile da Fabriano, c. 1400–1410

Stabat Mater (Latin for "the mother was standing") is a compositional form in the crucifixion of Jesus in art depicting the Virgin Mary under the cross during the crucifixion of Christ alongside John the Apostle.

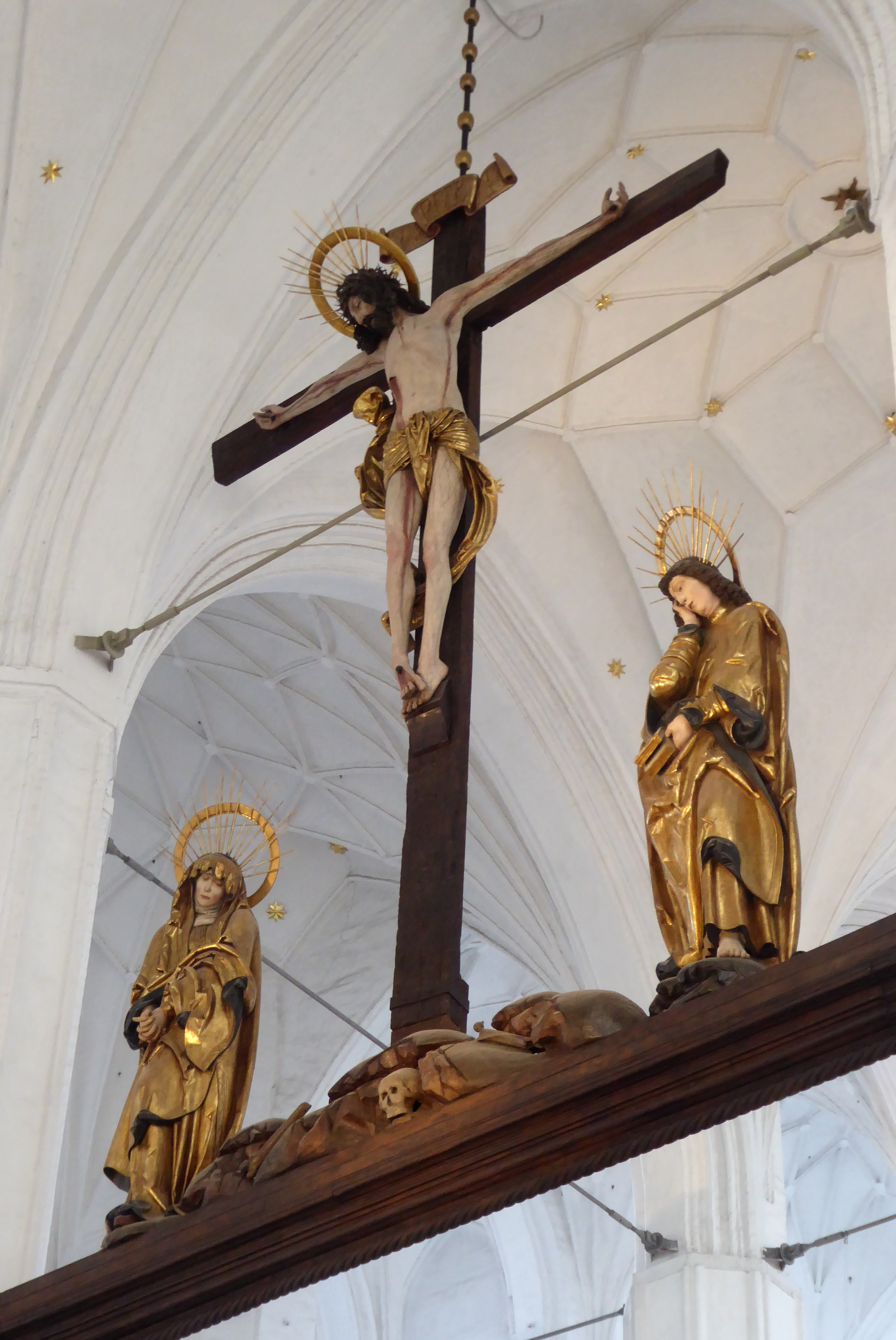
Rood cross group, Church of St. Mary, Gdańsk

It is common in groups of sculpture on a rood screen, and in paintings. In large hanging Crucifixions, Mary and John may be shown at a smaller scale beside Christ's torso.

== Description ==
In these depictions, the Virgin Mary and John the apostle are standing under the cross during the crucifixion of Christ, with only these three figures shown. Mary is almost always standing to the right hand side of the body of her son Jesus on the cross, with John standing to the left. It is distinguished from fully populated Crucifixion scenes where there may be considerable numbers of other figures, though these three have the same positions. It contrasts with depictions of the Swoon of the Virgin, where she is seen fainting; this is only seen from the late medieval period onwards.

In the Stabat Mater depictions the Virgin Mary is represented as an actor and spectator in the scene, a mystical emblem of faith in the Crucified Savior, an ideal figure at once the mother of Christ and the personified Church.

== Biblical reference ==
In the Gospel of John, chapter 19:

Now there stood by the cross of Jesus his mother, and his mother's sister, Mary the wife of Cleophas, and Mary Magdalene. When Jesus therefore saw his mother, and the disciple standing by, whom he loved, he saith unto his mother, Woman, behold thy son! Then saith he to the disciple, Behold thy mother! And from that hour that disciple took her unto his own home.

— Jn 19, 25-27

== Similar representations ==
In some depictions of the Crucifixion, Christ is alone in a "Christ on the Cross" scene, while in other representations, other people can be seen alongside Mary and John: the penitent thief, the impenitent thief, the women at the crucifixion, Roman soldiers, Jewish leaders, among others.

Stabat Mater is one of the three common artistic representations of a sorrowful Virgin Mary, the other two being Mater Dolorosa (Mother of Sorrows) and Pietà.

== In Christian tradition ==
The depictions generally reflect the first three lines of the "Stabat Mater" poem:

At the Cross her station keeping,
stood the mournful Mother weeping,
close to Jesus to the last.

The concept is also present in other designs, e.g. the Miraculous Medal and the more general Marian Cross. The Miraculous Medal, by Saint Catherine Labouré in the 19th century, includes a letter M, representing the Virgin Mary under the Cross.

The Marian Cross is also used in the coat of arms of Pope John Paul II, about which the Vatican newspaper, L'Osservatore Romano, stated in 1978: "the large and majestic capital M recalls the presence of the Madonna under the Cross and Her exceptional participation in Redemption."

== Gallery ==
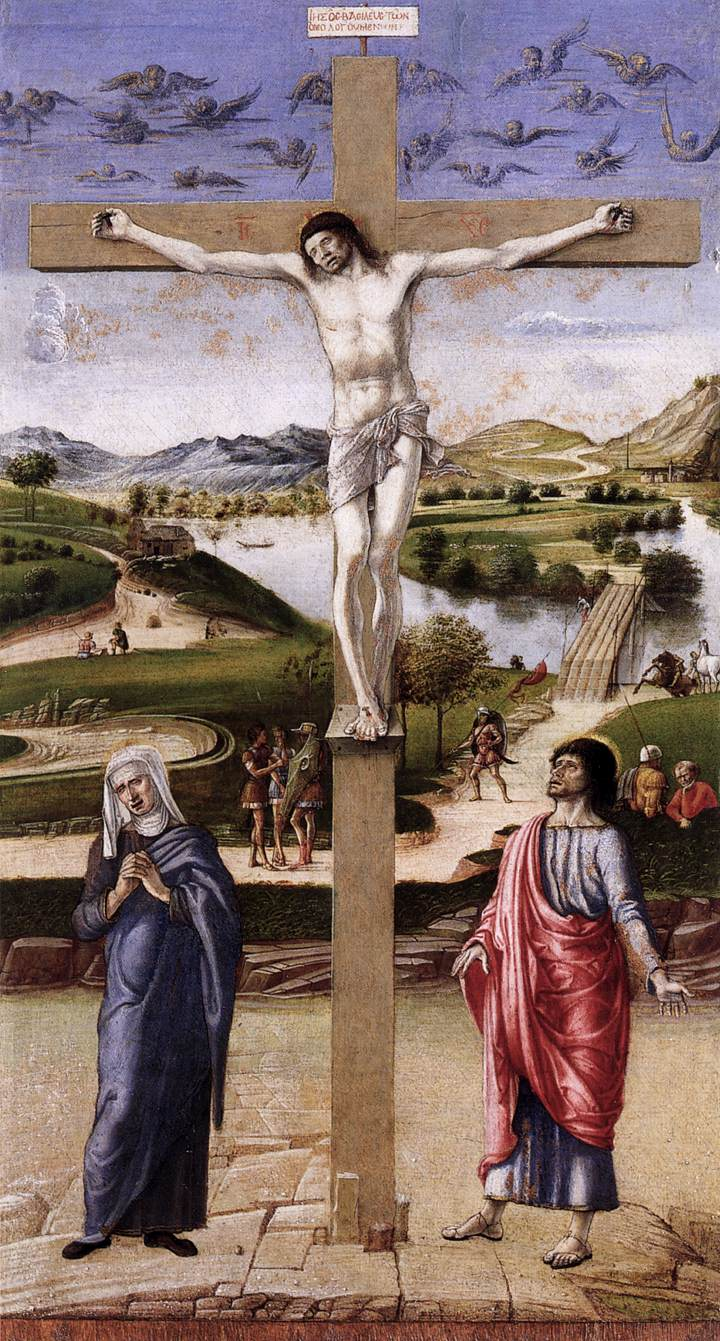
Giovanni Bellini, 1455

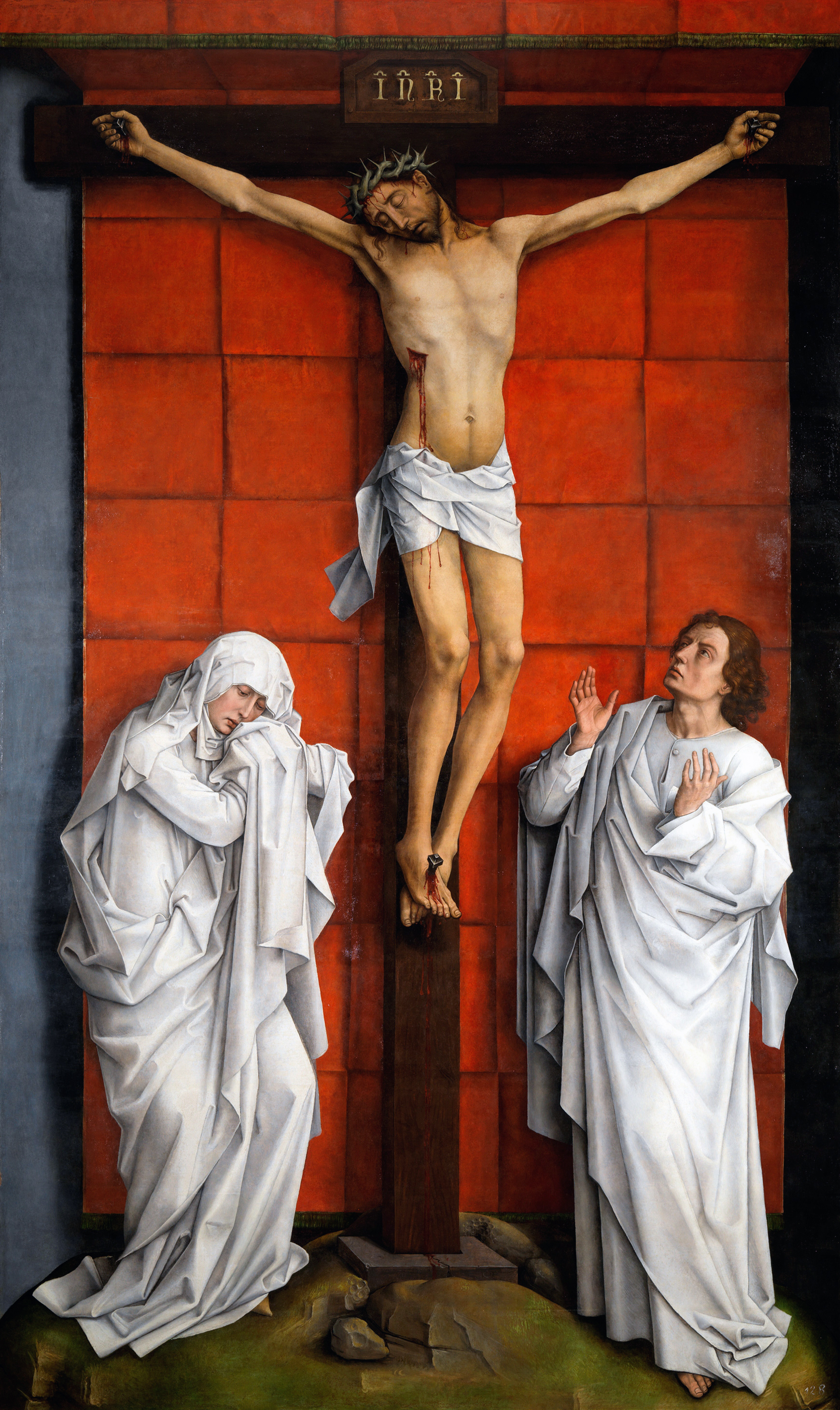
Rogier van der Weyden, c. 1460

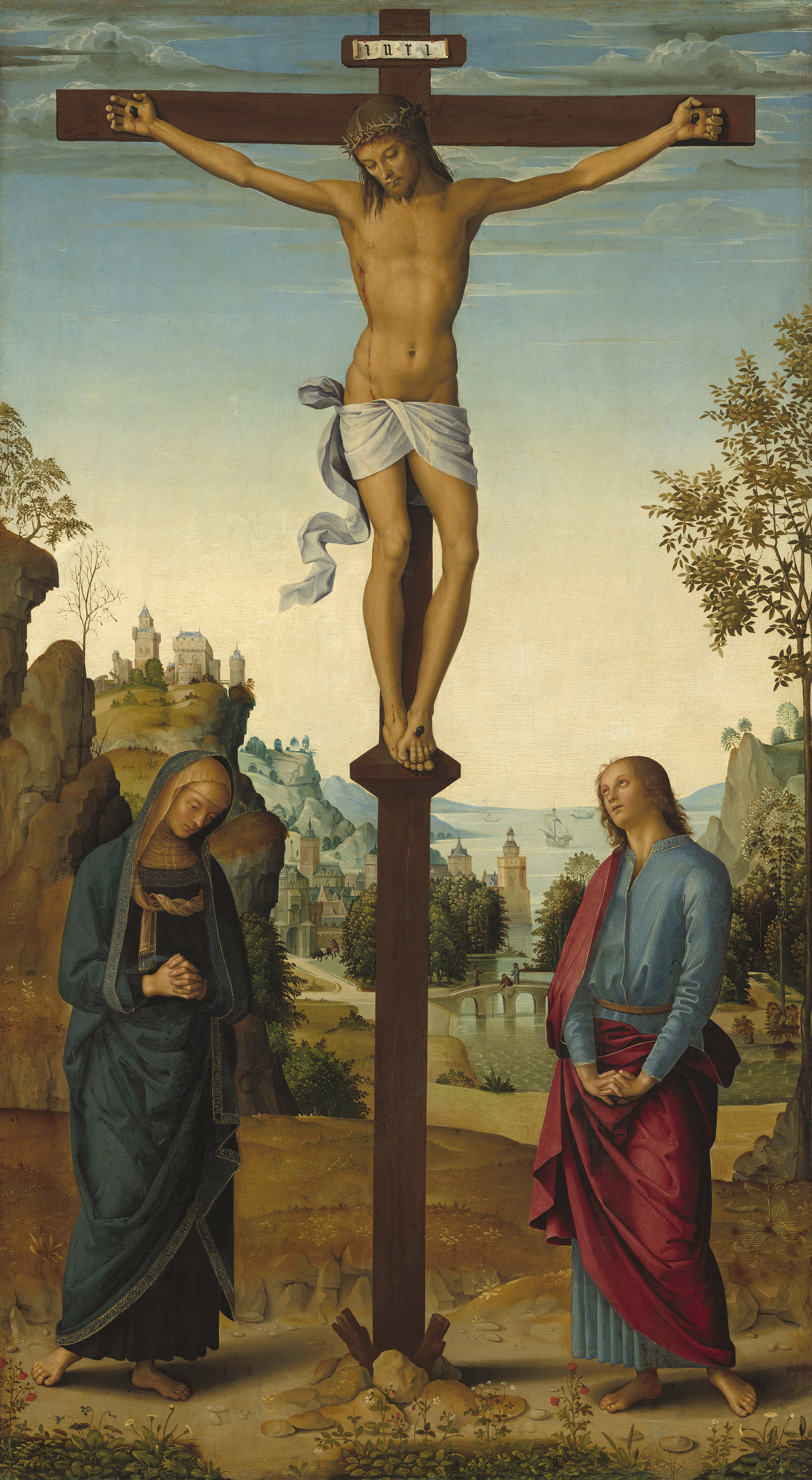
Pietro Perugino, c. 1482

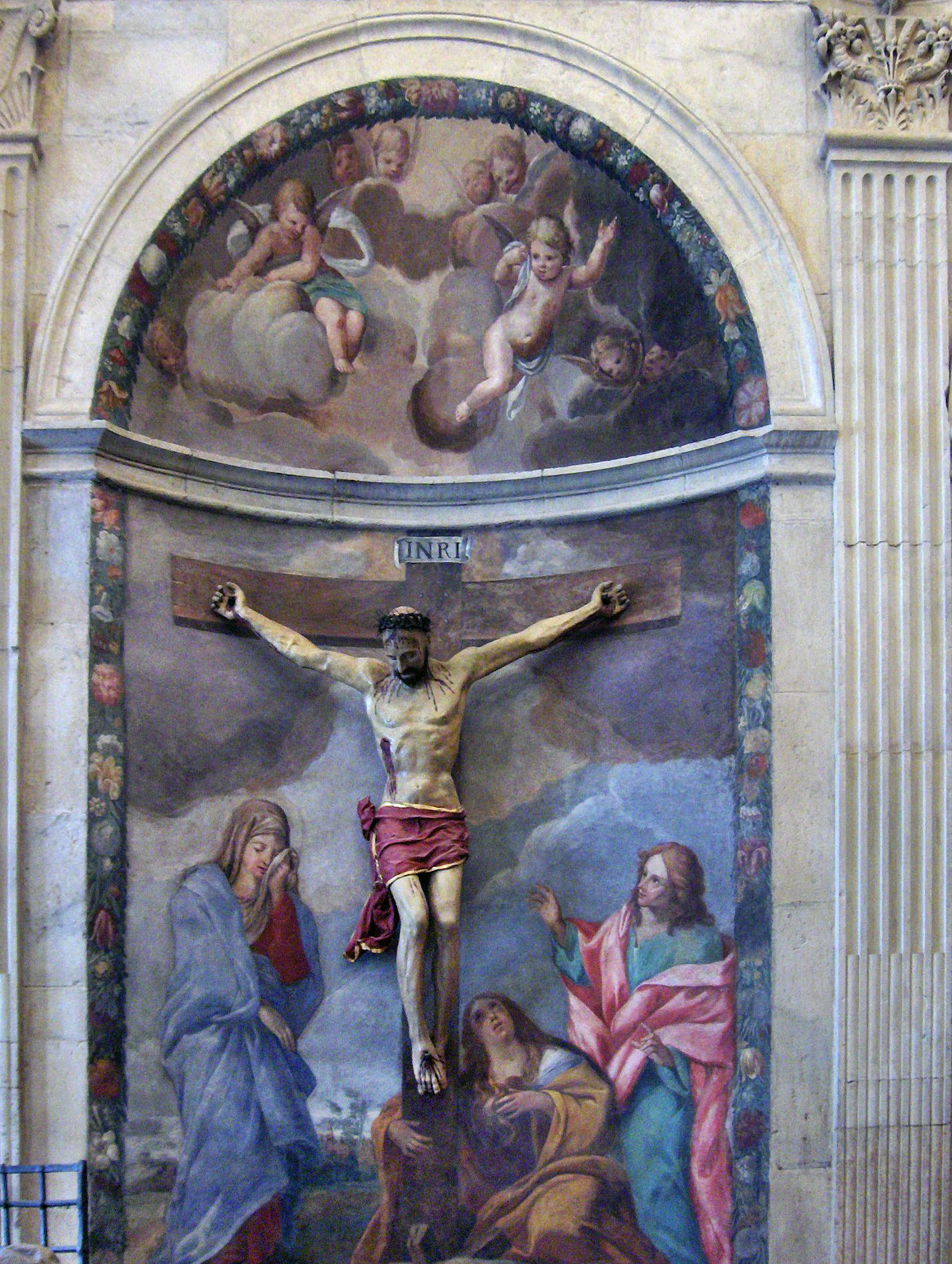
Noël Quillerier, Oratorio della Nunziatella, Foligno, Italy, 1625–1626

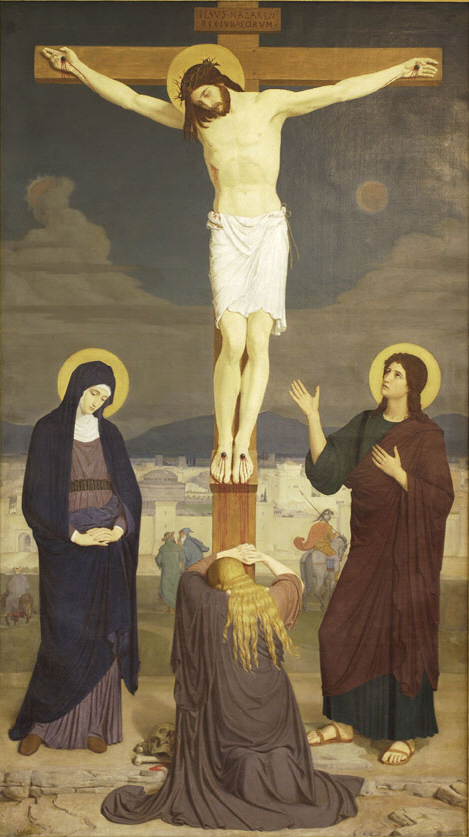
Gabriel Wüger OSB, 1868

== See also ==
- Marian art in the Catholic Church
- Depiction of Jesus
