= Stabat Mater (Pärt) =

1985 musical composition by Arvo Pärt

- by Arvo Pärt
- Page of the score, the first stanza of text
- Text: Stabat Mater
- Language: Latin
- Composed: 1985
- Scoring: soprano; alto; tenor; violin viola; cello

Premiere
- Date: 12 June 2008 (version for chorus and orchestra)
- Location: Musikvereinssaal, Vienna
- Performers: Wiener Singverein; Tonkünstler-Orchester Niederösterreich

Stabat Mater is a musical setting of the Stabat Mater sequence composed by Arvo Pärt in 1985, a commission of the Alban Berg Foundation. The piece is scored for a trio of singers: soprano, alto, and tenor; and a trio of string instruments: violin, viola, and violoncello; it has a duration of approximately 24 minutes. A version with expanded forces (mixed chorus and orchestra) was premiered on 12 June 2008 at the Großer Musikvereinssaal during the Wiener Festwochen 2008 with Kristjan Järvi conducting the Singverein der Gesellschaft der Musikfreunde in Wien and the Tonkünstler-Orchester Niederösterreich. This new version was commissioned by the Tonkünstler-Orchester. Stabat Mater is composed in Pärt's characteristic tintinnabuli style (which he has employed nearly exclusively since 1976) in which arpeggiations of a major or minor triad are combined with ascending or descending diatonic scales.

"Stabat Mater"
Excerpt of "Stabat Mater" as performed by the Hilliard Ensemble and as shown in the musical score to the right.

== Structure ==
The text of the Stabat Mater consists of ten stanzas, in an AABCCB rhyme scheme and a syllabic meter of 887887. The poetic feet are all trochees. This verse form is characteristic of the later metrical sequence. As in several of Pärt's works, measure breaks are determined not by regular groupings of beats and stress, but rather by the words themselves. Pärt places dotted lines in the score at line breaks in the poetry, and as in Passio, there is usually a rest following any punctuation.

On a large scale, Pärt frames the ten stanzas with a 108-measure introduction and coda nearly identical in structure and musical materials; the vocalists sing only the word "Amen". Within these frames, Pärt divides the ten stanzas into four groups, separated by instrumental interludes of a vastly different musical character. The four groups are stanzas 1–2, 3–5, 6–8, and 9–10. This grouping of 2+3+3+2 and its surrounding frame creates a perfectly symmetrical structure. It is possible to measure each of these sections' lengths in terms of both the measures created by the number of words and the rhythmic groupings of the underlying triple pulse. The chart below represents the proportions by means of the rhythmic groupings. The introduction is exactly the same length as the coda, the 2nd and 3rd interlude are each half the length of the 1st interlude, and stanzas 1–2 and 3–5 are roughly equal to 9–10 and 4–6.

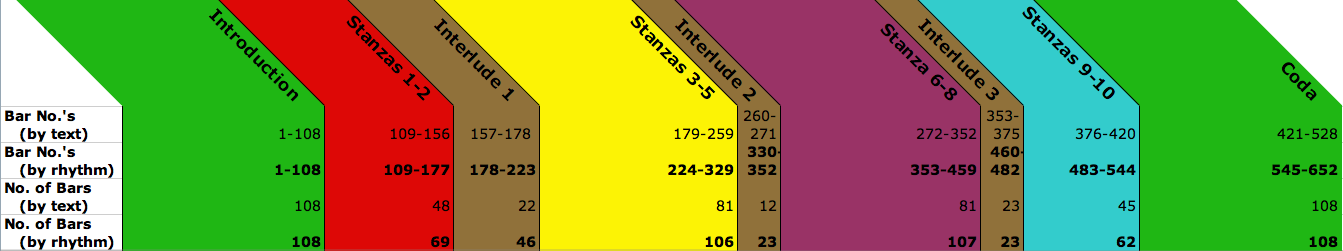
