= Stabat Mater (Palestrina) =

Composition by Giovanni Pierluigi da Palestrina

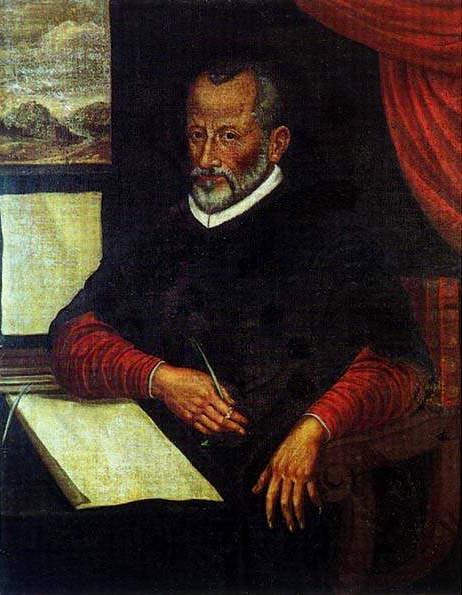
Portrait of Giovanni Pierluigi da Palestrina, by an unknown Italian painter (c. 1590)

Stabat Mater is a motet for double chorus by Giovanni Pierluigi da Palestrina. It was composed in the Late Renaissance period sometime during the late 16th century. It is centered on the 20 verses of text that constitute the hymn of the same name.

== History ==
The text predates Palestrina's composition and dates as far back as the 13th century. The author of the text is unknown. Some possible authors include: St. Bonaventure, Pope Innocent III, and Jacopone da Todi, a Franciscan friar. The liturgical text is centered on Mary's suffering at the Crucifixion of Christ. It has both a regular meter – frequently trochaic – and an intricate rhyme scheme, both of which are qualities that most academics date back to the 12th century.

Palestrina's Stabat Mater appears to have been written for Pope Gregory XIV, who was Pope from 1590 until his death in 1591. Therefore, the work may have been composed during this time– a period which was within the final years of Palestrina's life. Since then, the work was initially guarded closely by the choir for which it was written. The first part was performed annually on Palm Sunday at a slower tempo.

In Rome in 1770, the English historian Dr. Burney was able to obtain a copy of the work. This acquisition produced the first printed edition in 1771 in London, in "La Musica Che Si canta annualmente nelle Funzioni della Settimana Santa nella Capella Pontificia". Since then, the composition has had many editions, including one by the German composer Richard Wagner in 1877.

== Structure ==
Stabat Mater is a motet for unaccompanied double chorus, and consists of 20 sections in accordance with the 20 verses of text. It is scored for double chorus, with both choruses set for SATB chorus. It contains rare examples of anticipation, which are relatively early for its time. It also contains many suspensions. The texture is thick and is more homophonic than contrapuntal.

The two choruses alternate during the work, usually per line of verse. Within the work, there are moments of full chorus, where both choruses sing together, and moments with soloists within the two choirs.

The piece contains changes in tempo: It begins as Adagio ma non troppo and slows to Largo at the beginning of the 9th verse. At the start of verse 11, it returns to the first tempo, but this time un poco animato. The tempo winds down to Piu Lento at the beginning of verse 20, before slowing down to Largo for the final 9 bars.

The work either begins on the dominant of D Dorian or on the tonic A Mixolydian, with an unexpected progression of four major chords, which is an unusual chord progression for this time period. This composition arguably concludes in D Major with a cadence that spans three bars.

== See also ==
Choral Public Domain Library information on Stabat Mater by Palestrina
