= George Oldroyd =

English organist, composer and teacher

George Oldroyd (1 December 1886, Healey, West Riding of Yorkshire, England – 26 February 1951, London, England) was an English organist, composer of organ and choral music, and a teacher of Anglican church music.

== Career ==
Oldroyd studied with the organist and composer Arthur Eaglefield Hull and took violin lessons from Johann Rasch and Frank Arnold. He graduated with a B.Mus (1912) and D.Mus (1917) at the University of London. In the middle of his studying he spent a year in Paris as the organist of St George's English Church.

He was organist of St. Alban's Church, Holborn from 1919 to 1920, and then of St Michael's Church, Croydon from 1920 until his death in 1951. Both are churches firmly rooted within the Anglo-Catholic tradition in the Church of England. In the 1920s he taught at Trinity College, London, and from 1933-1948 was Director of Music at Whitgift School in Croydon. From 1944 he was Dean of the Faculty of Music at London University, becoming King Edward Professor of Music from 1951, succeeding Stanley Marchant.

== Music ==
He composed numerous settings of the mass, but is best remembered for his Mass of the Quiet Hour composed in 1928, whose swooping melodies and lush harmonies recall the "Palm Court" style of that era. It was dedicated to the Archbishop of Canterbury, Cosmo Gordon Lang, in whose diocese St. Michael's at that time lay, and is still part of the repertoire of many English cathedrals and parish churches. There is also a large scale Stabat Mater (1922), and Jhesu Christ, St Mary's Sone: A Spiritual Rhapsody (1931) for voices and orchestra. This piece was successfully revived by Harrison Oxley at Bury St Edmunds in 2001. There is a recording of the anthem When Jordan hushed his waters still by the choir of Leeds Parish Church.

His organ works are mostly short. The earlier pieces, published by Augener, include Contemplation (1913), the Prelude in F sharp minor (1914), Lune de Miel (1919, a wedding piece with the title a play on the words 'Honey Moon'), Canticle (Deus Miseratur) (1919), Three Hymn Tune Meditations (1924), and the Phantasy: Prelude and Chorale (1924, using the chorale melody 'Nun danket'). From the 1930s OUP was his publisher for organ works, including the Three Liturgical Preludes (1938) and the Three Liturgical Improvisations (1948). Other works include the part song, 'Lute book lullaby' and pieces for piano and for violin.

Oldroyd was an authority on counterpoint, and published The Technique And Spirit Of Fugue: An Historical Study in 1948 and Polyphonic Writing for Voices in 6 and 8 Parts in 1953. He was also the co-author of a manual on plainchant accompaniment, with Charles William Pearce (1856–1928).
