= Antoine Coysevox =

French sculptor (1640–1720)

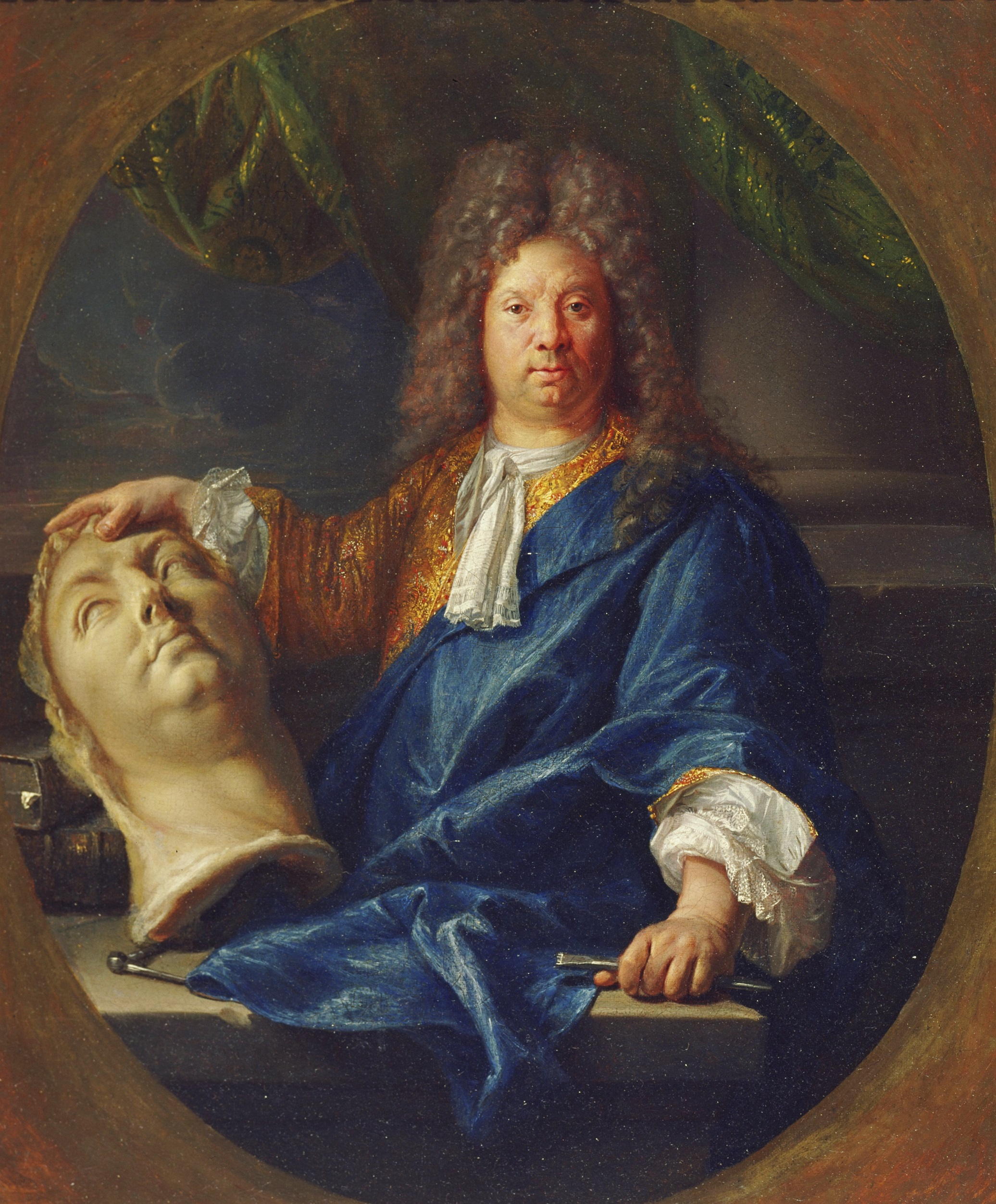
- Antoine Coysevox by François Jouvenet (1701)
- Born: 29 September 1640; Lyon, France
- Died: 10 October 1720 (aged 80); Paris, France
- Known for: Sculpture
- Movement: Baroque and Louis XIV Style

Director of the Académie de Peinture et de Sculpture
- In office 1702–1705
- Monarch: Louis XIV
- Preceded by: Charles de La Fosse
- Succeeded by: Jean Jouvenet

Charles Antoine Coysevox (French pronunciation: [kwazəvo] or [kwazvo]; 29 September 1640 – 10 October 1720) was a French sculptor in the Baroque and Louis XIV style, best known for his sculpture decorating the gardens and Palace of Versailles and his portrait busts.

== Biography ==
Coysevox was born 29 September 1640 in Lyon. He was the son of a sculptor, from a family which had emigrated from Franche-Comté, a Spanish possession at the time. He made his first work of sculpture of the Madonna when he was only seventeen.

Coysevox came to Paris in 1657 and joined the workshop of the sculptor Louis Lerambert. He trained himself further by making copies in marble of Roman sculptures, including a Venus de Medici and the Castor and Pollux. In 1666, he married Marguerite Quillerier, Lerambert's niece, who died a year after the marriage. In 1679, he married Claude Bourdict. In 1667 he was commissioned by the bishop of Strasbourg, Cardinal Fürstenberg, to statuary for his château at Saverne (Zabern).

In 1671, after four years spent working at Saverne, he returned to Paris. In 1676, his bust of the king's painter Charles Le Brun gained him admission to the Académie Royale. He became part of the extraordinary team of sculptors, painters, and decorators, under the control of Le Brun, who between 1677 and 1685 produced the decoration of the Palace and Gardens of Versailles. Later, between 1701 and 1709, when Louis XIV built a new Château de Marly, where he could escape from the crowds and ceremony at Versailles, with Coysevox providing several works for that site.

Coysevox rose steadily in the artistic hierarchy. He became a professor at the Royal Academy in 1678, and then its director in 1702, with an annual pension of four thousand livres. In this position, he guided the training of a generation of French sculptors, including his nephews Nicolas Coustou (1659–1733) and Guillaume Coustou (1677–1746), who became important figures in French sculpture of the early 18th century.

Coysevox died in Paris on 10 October 1720.

=== Monumental sculpture ===
A large part of his work is found at the Palace of Versailles. One of his most famous works is the large stucco medallion of Louis XIV, found in the Salon of War in the Palace. The King is portrayed as a Roman Emperor on horseback, trampling his enemies, like a modern Caesar, gazing ahead to the future, as a figure of Victory offers him a crown of laurels.

He executed Justice and Force and the River Garonne at Versailles. Among his works from Marly are the Mercury and the equestrian Fame (1702) and four groups commissioned for the "river" in the château's park; La Seine and its pendant at the head of the cascade, La Marne, Neptune and Amphitrite. Models in weather-resistant stucco were set up in 1699, replaced by marbles when they were finished in 1705. The groups were seized as biens nationaux in 1796 and dispersed: the Seine and Marne went to Saint-Cloud, and the Neptune and Amphitrite went to Brest in 1801.

Besides the works given above, he carved about a dozen funeral monuments, including those to Jean-Baptiste Colbert (at Saint-Eustache, Paris), to Cardinal Mazarin (in the Louvre), and to the painter Le Brun (in the church of Saint-Nicolas-du-Chardonnet).

Between 1708 and 1710 Coysevox produced three further sculptures for Marly, a Pan (now in the Louvre), flanked by a Flora and a Dryad (in the Tuileries Garden). A highly finished terracotta bozzetto or reduction of the Dryad, signed and dated 1709, is in the Ashmolean Museum, Oxford.

For the façade of the dome of the royal chapel of Les Invalides, he sculpted a bust of Charlemagne, a pendant to the statue of Louis XI by another royal sculptor, Nicolas Coustou. On the upper level of the same chapel, he made a group of statues illustrating The Cardinal Virtues.

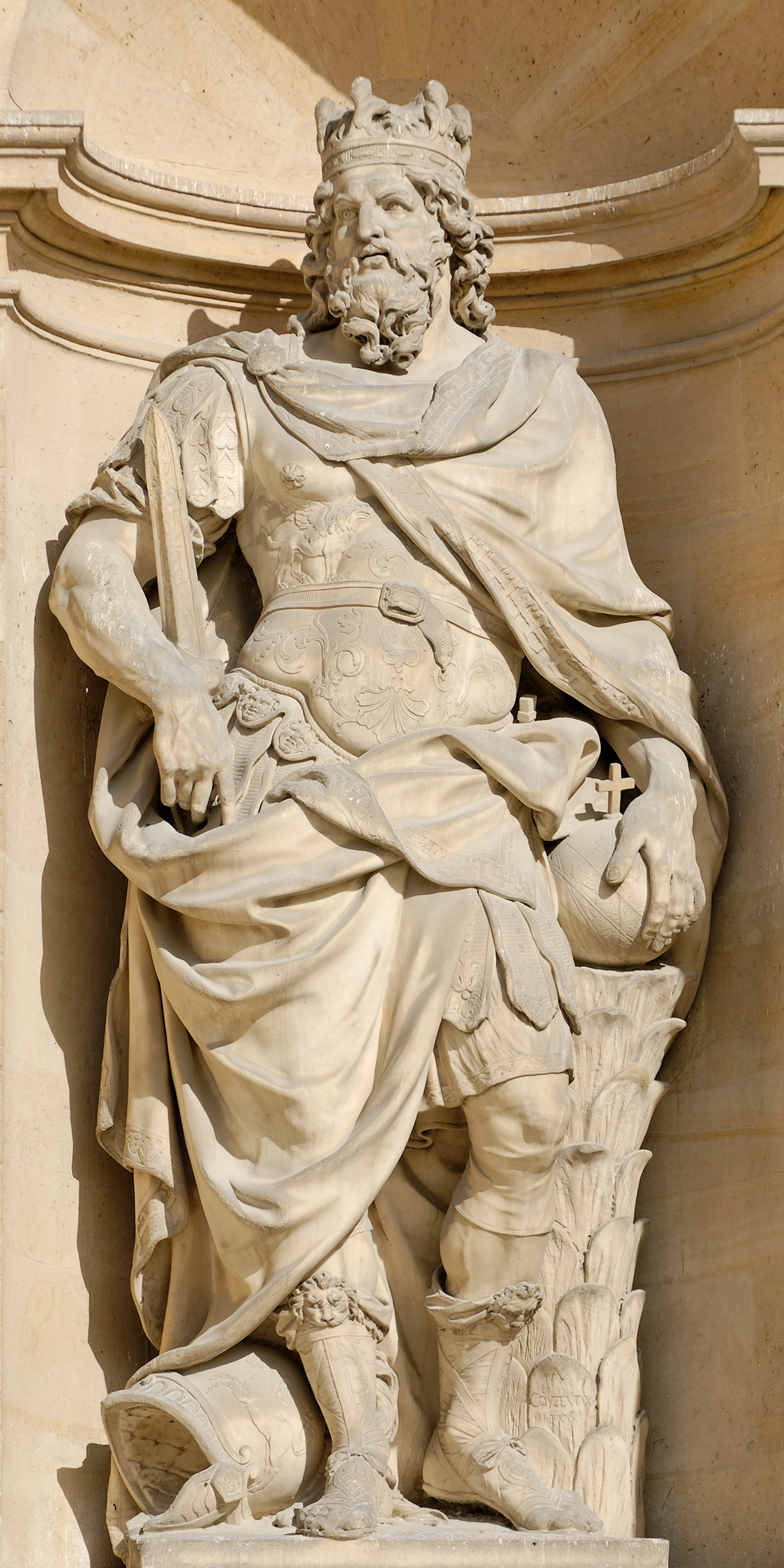
Charlemagne, (1706), right niche of the facade of the dome of Les Invalides in Paris

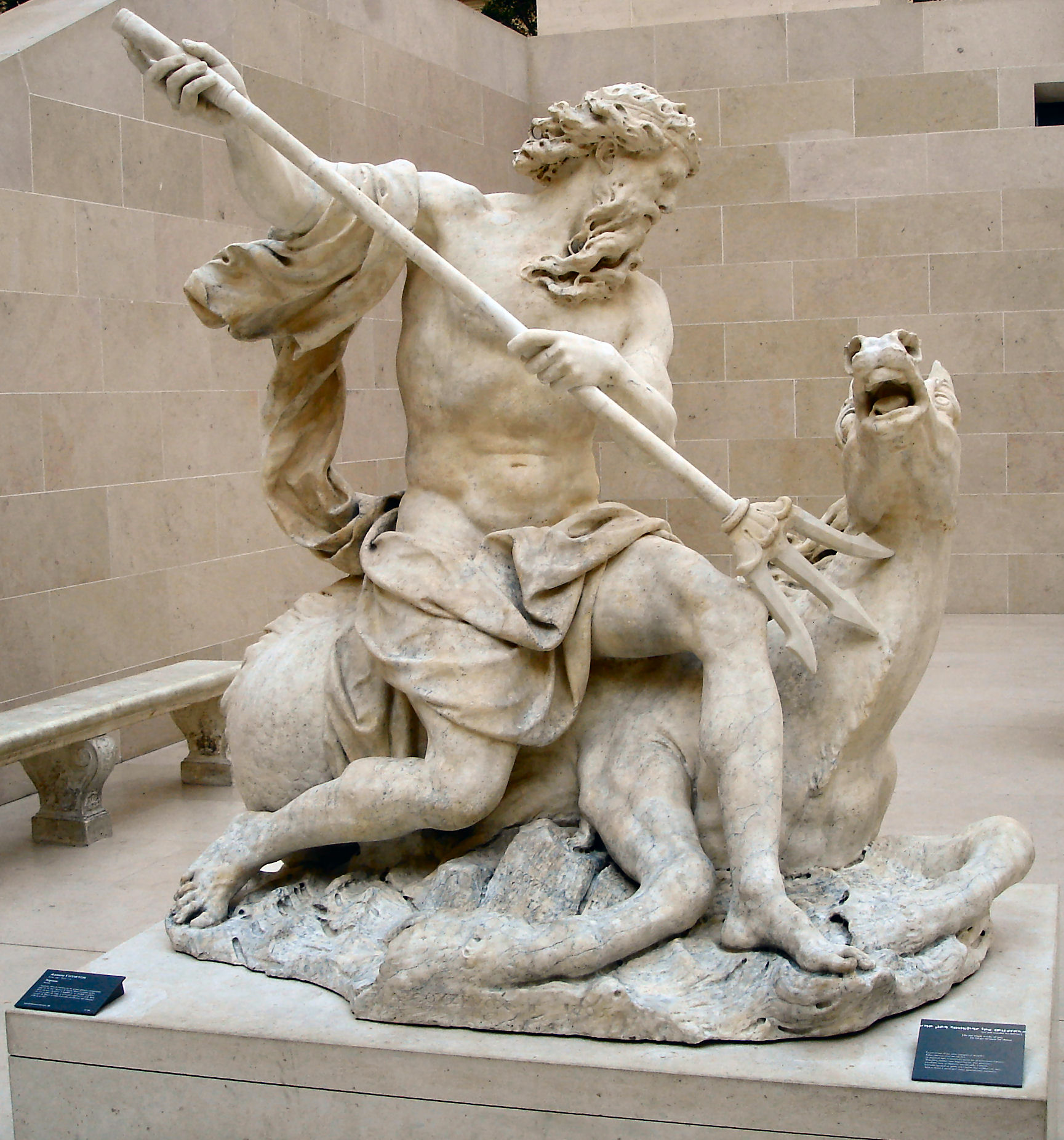
Neptune, from Marly, 1699–1705 (Louvre)

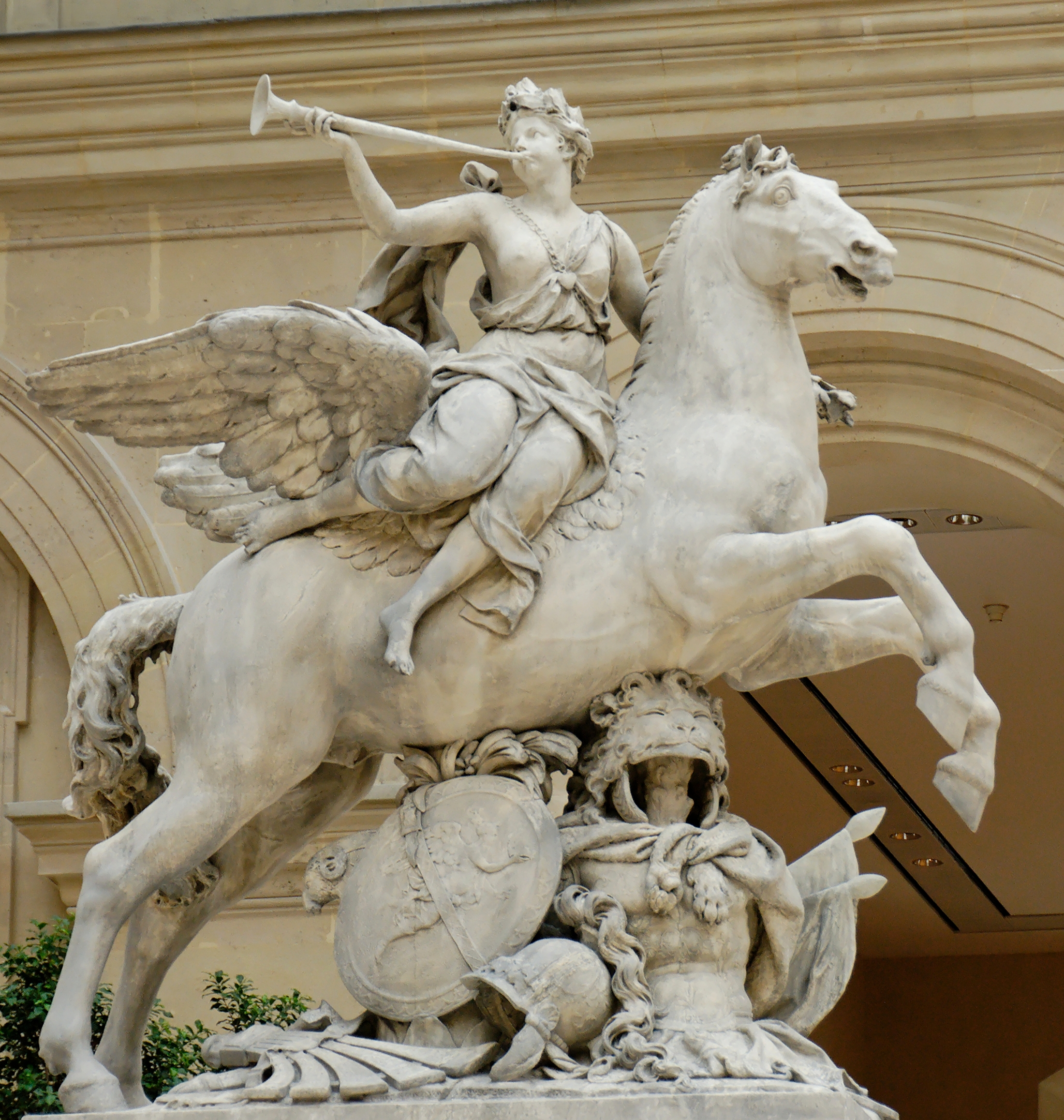
Equestrian Fame of Louis XIV, for Marly, 1702, removed to the Tuileries Garden, 1719

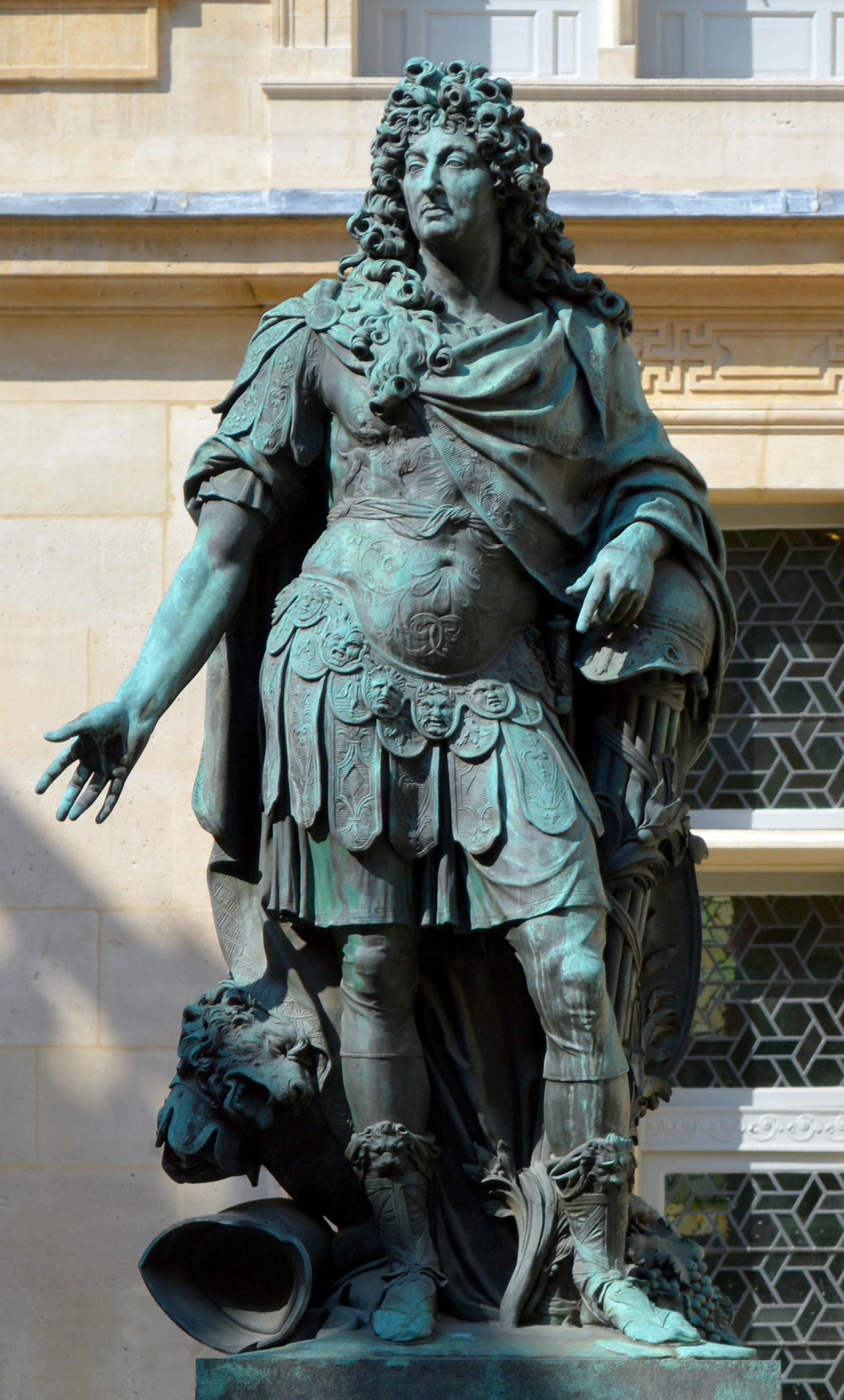
Louis XIV of France, by Coysevox, Carnavalet Museum

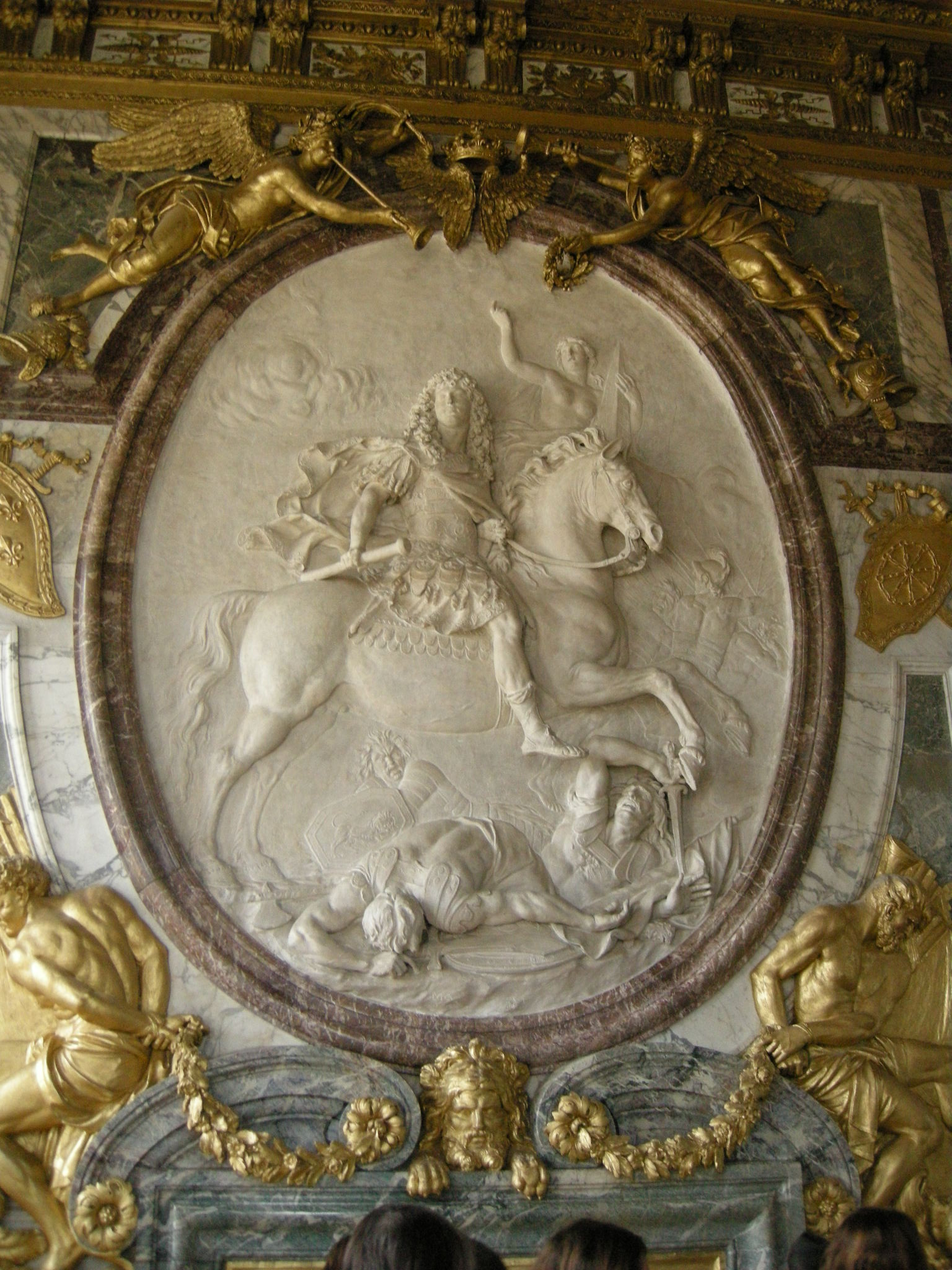
Stucco medallion of Louis XIV, Palace of Versailles

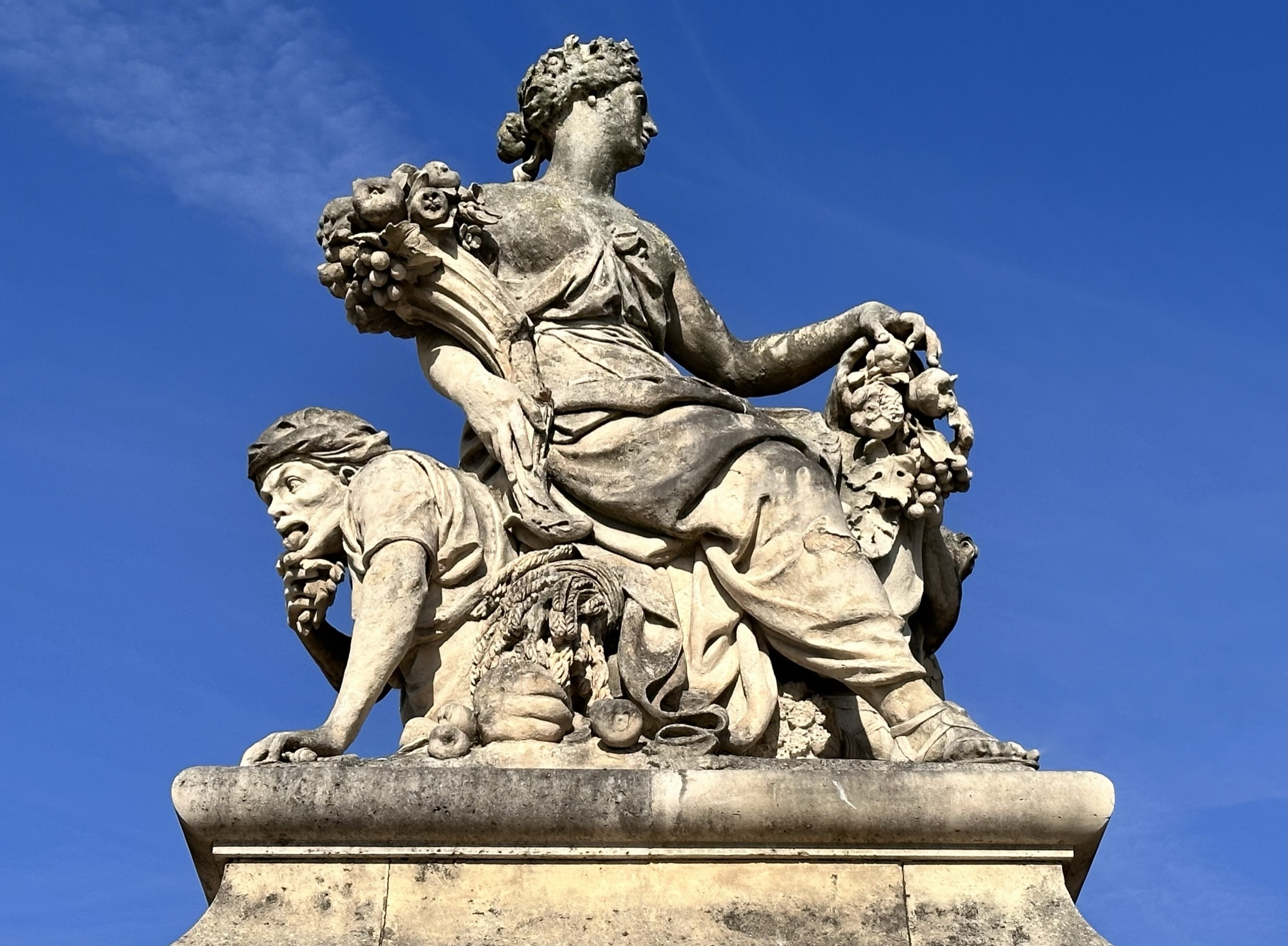
L'Abondance at the Pavillon Dufour, Palace of Versailles

=== Portrait busts ===
Coysevox sculpted portrait busts of many of the celebrated men and women of his age. The faces of his busts were considered remarkably accurate; he did not flatter his subjects, but by the poses, detail and precision of the costumes he gave them a particular dignity. His subjects included Louis XIV and Louis XV, at Versailles; Jean-Baptiste Colbert (the kneeling figure of his tomb at Saint-Eustache); Cardinal Mazarin, (in the church of the Collège des Quatre-Nations); Louis, Grand Condé (in the Louvre); Maria Theresa of Spain; Turenne; Vauban; the Cardinal de Bouillon; and Melchior de Polignac; the duc de Chaulnes (National Gallery of Art, Washington); François Fénelon; Jean Racine; André Le Nôtre (church of St-Roch); Jacques Benigne Bossuet (in the Louvre); the comte d'Harcourt; Cardinal Wilhelm Egon von Fürstenberg; and Charles Le Brun (in the Louvre).

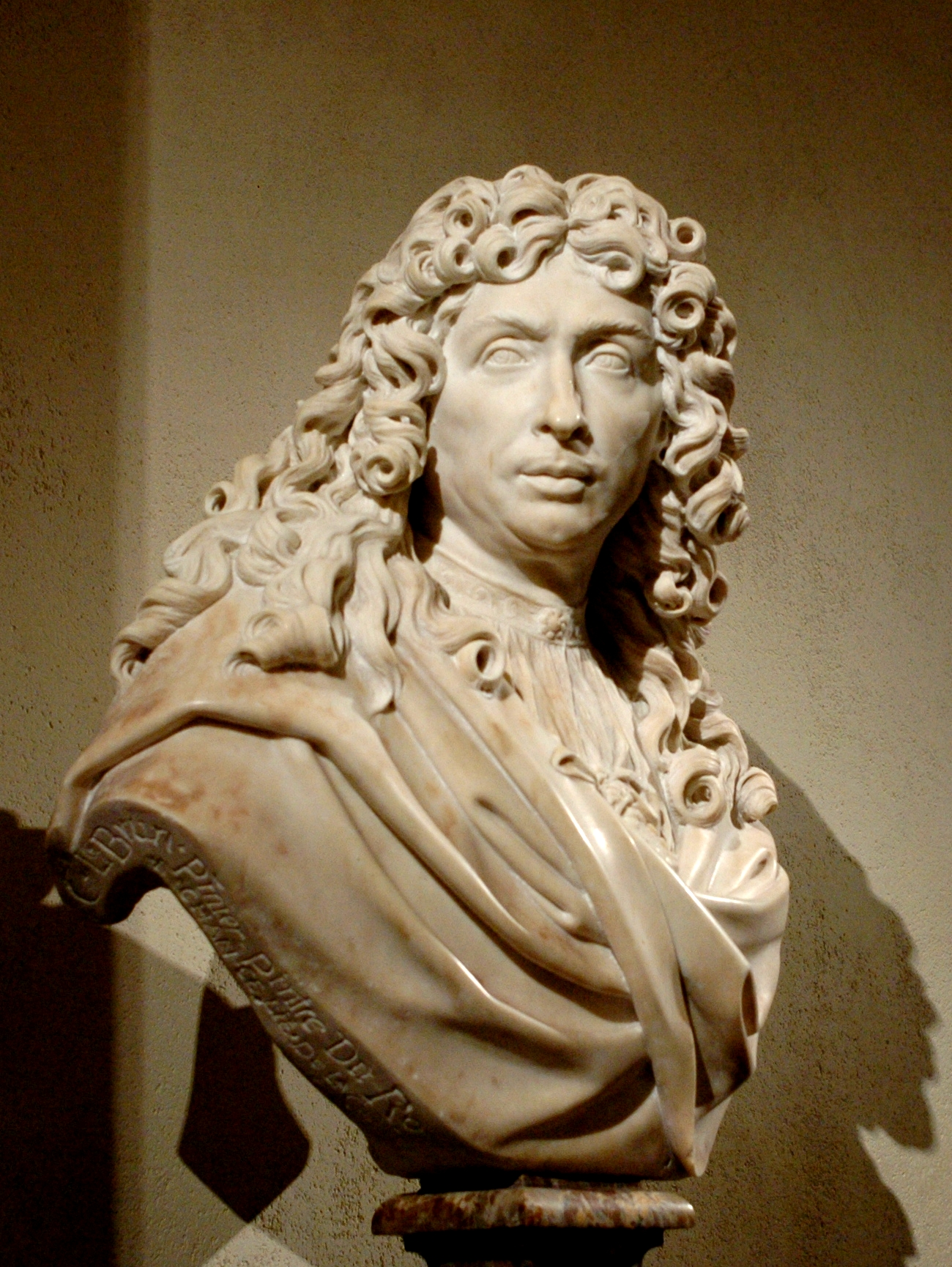
Bust of Charles LeBrun, (1676) (Louvre)

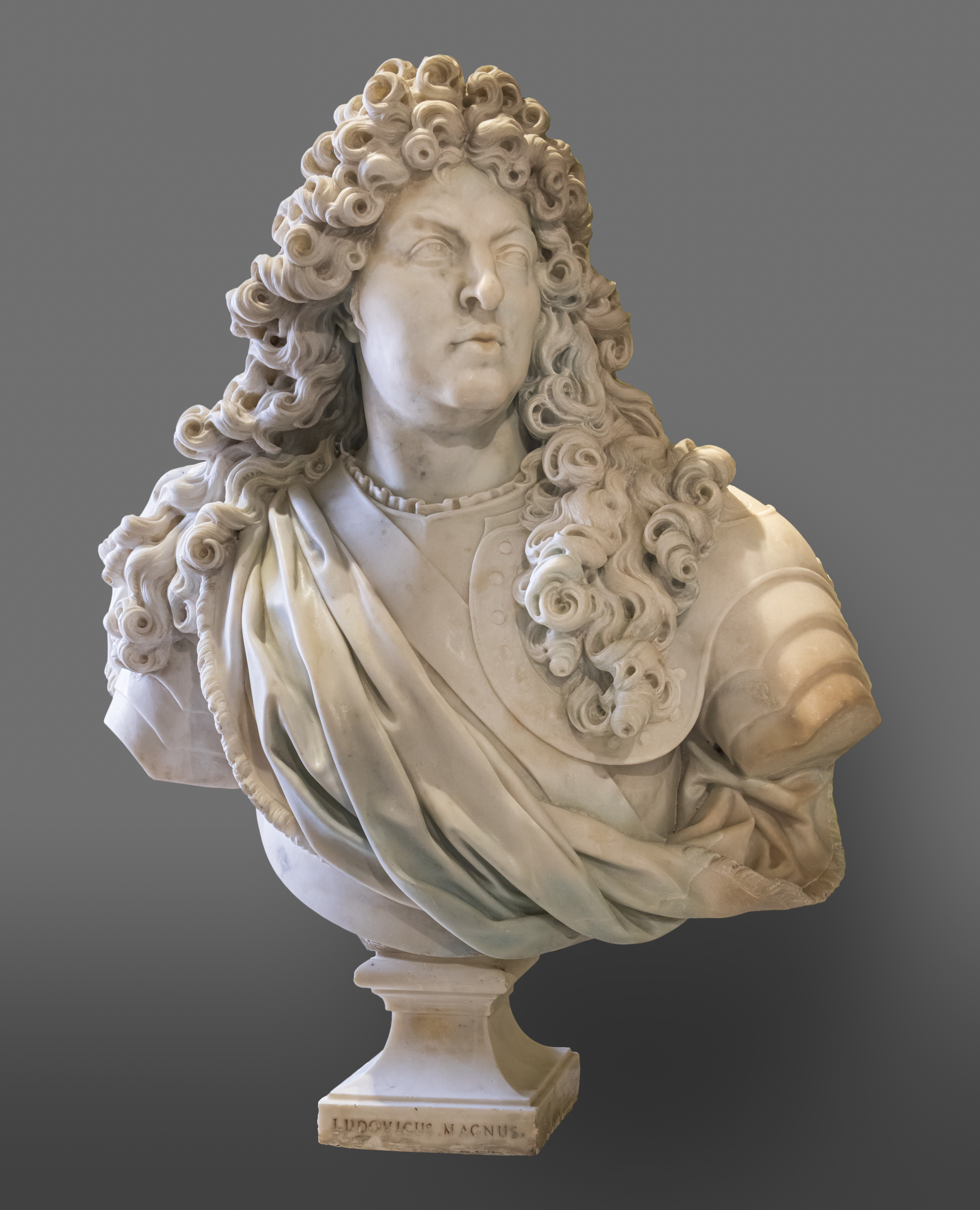
Louis XIV (1680), Musée d'Art et d'Histoire de Narbonne

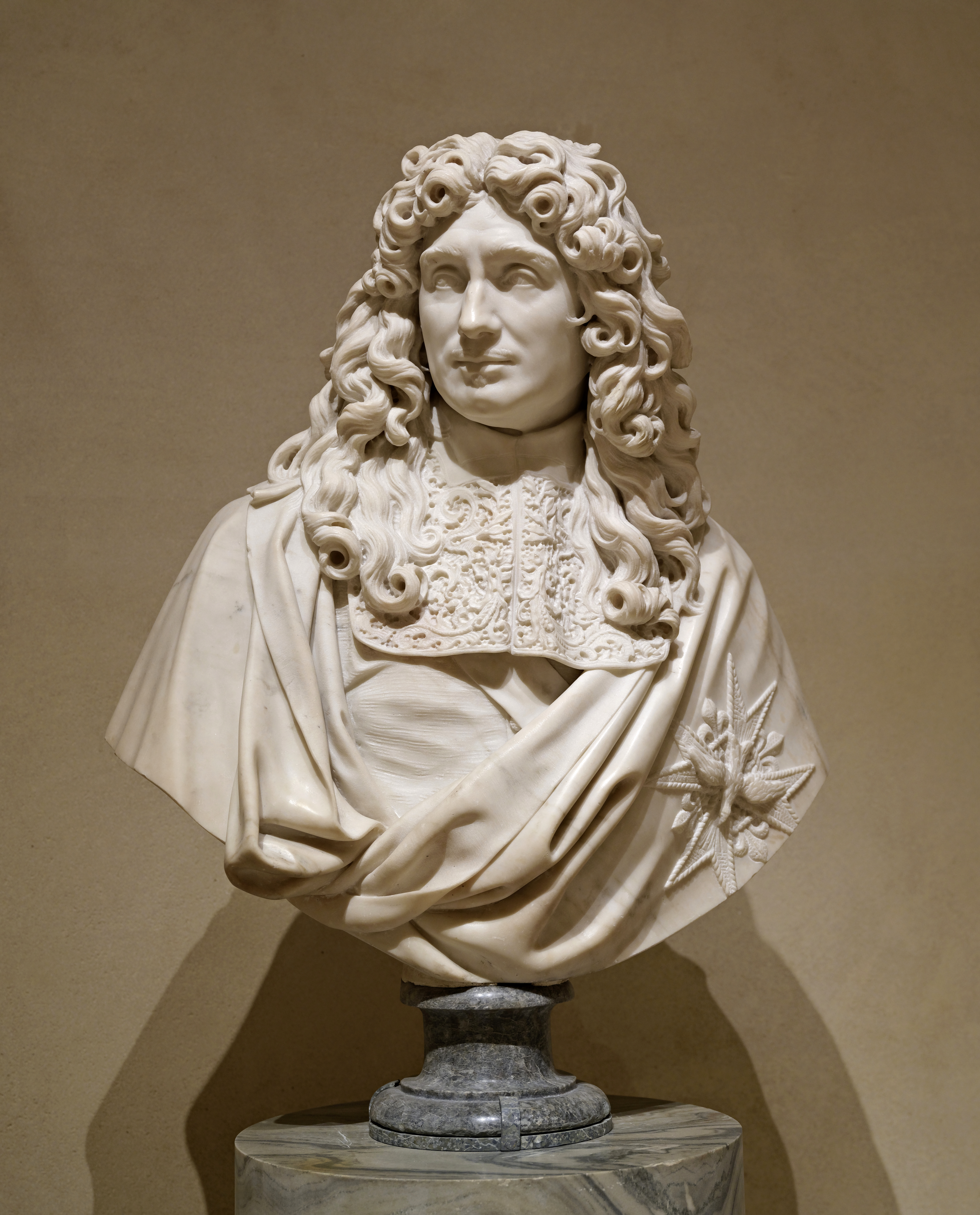
Jean-Baptiste Colbert (Louvre)

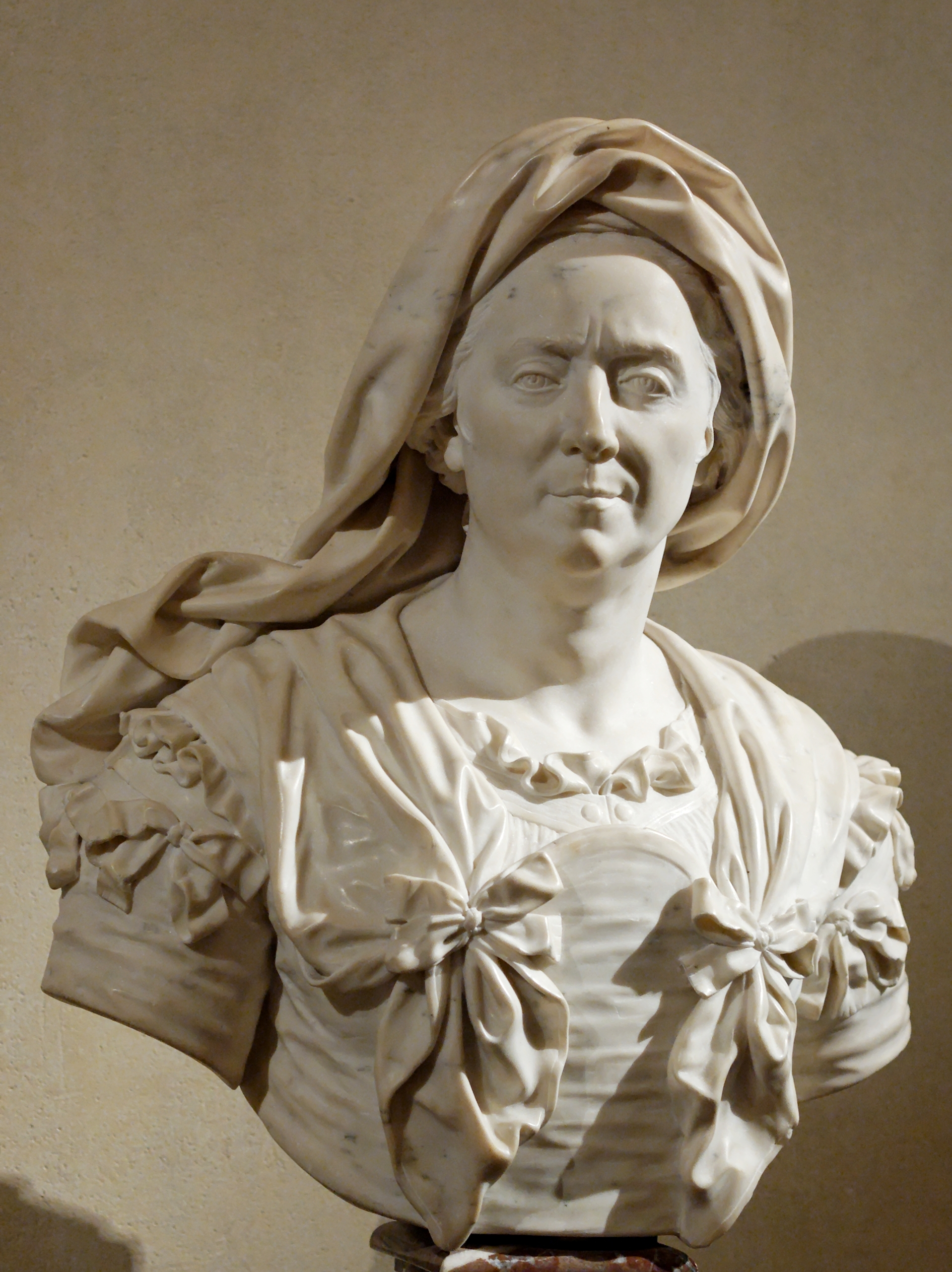
Marie Serre, mother of Hyacinthe Rigaud (Louvre) (1706)

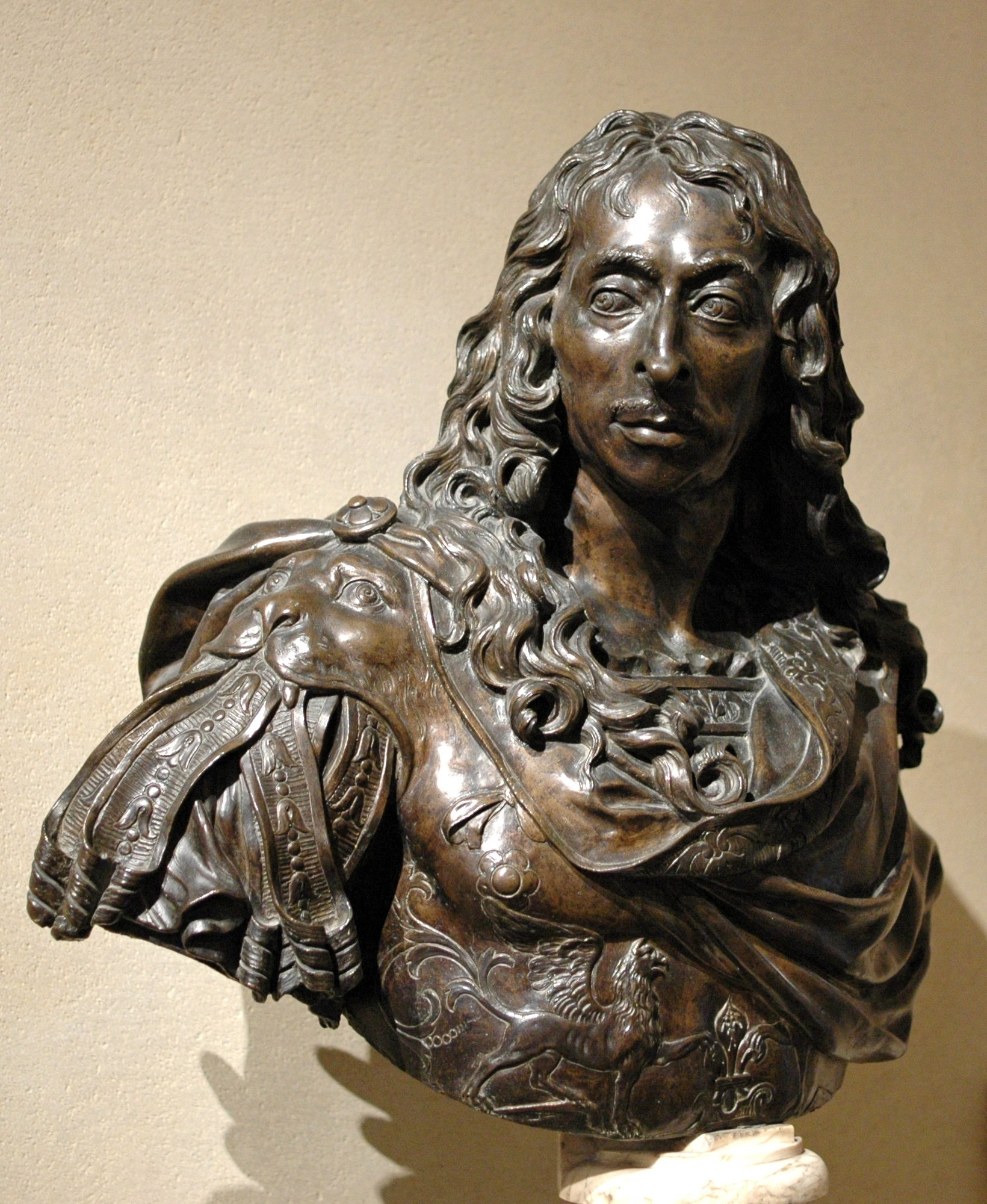
Louis, Grand Condé (Louvre)

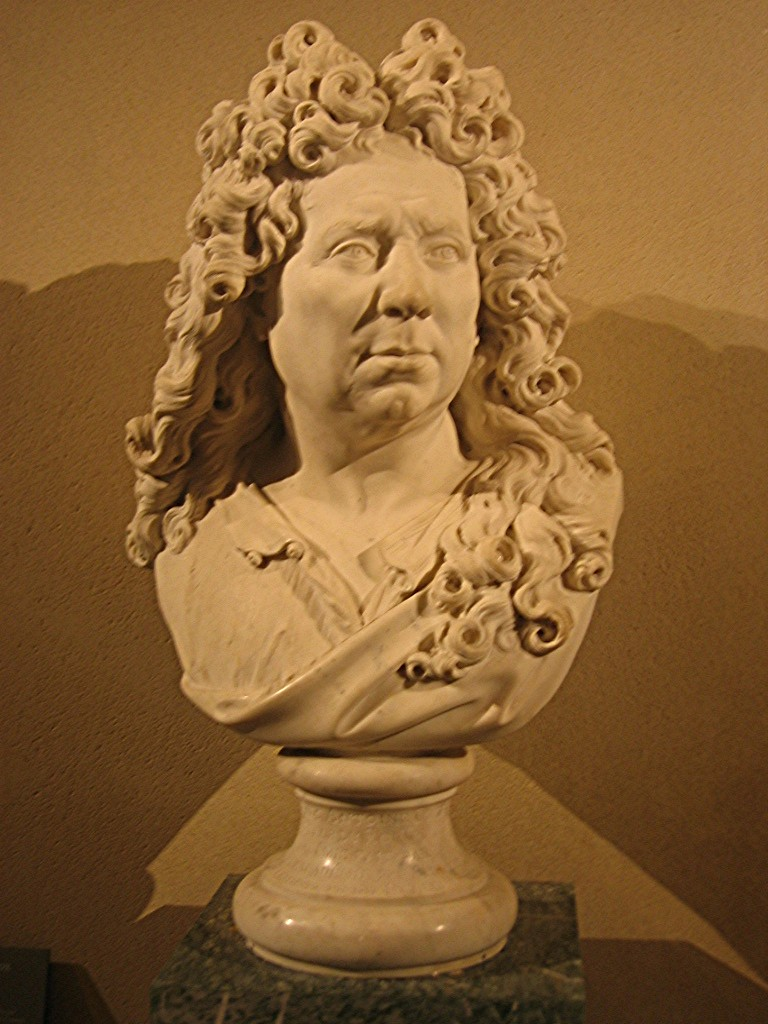
Self-portrait (Louvre)

== Bibliography ==
- Geese, Uwe (2015). "Section on Baroque sculpture". L'Art Baroque – Architecture – Sculpture – Peinture (French translation from German ed.). Cologne: H.F. Ulmann. ISBN 978-3-8480-0856-8.
- Benoist, L. (1930). Coysevox. Séries Les Maîtres de l'art. Paris.
- Souchal, François; de La Mourèyre, Françoise; Dumuis, Henriette (1977). French Sculptors of the 17th and 18th Centuries, the Reign of Louis XIV, Catalogue A-F. Oxford: Bruno Cassirer.
