= Unity Phelan =

American ballet dancer

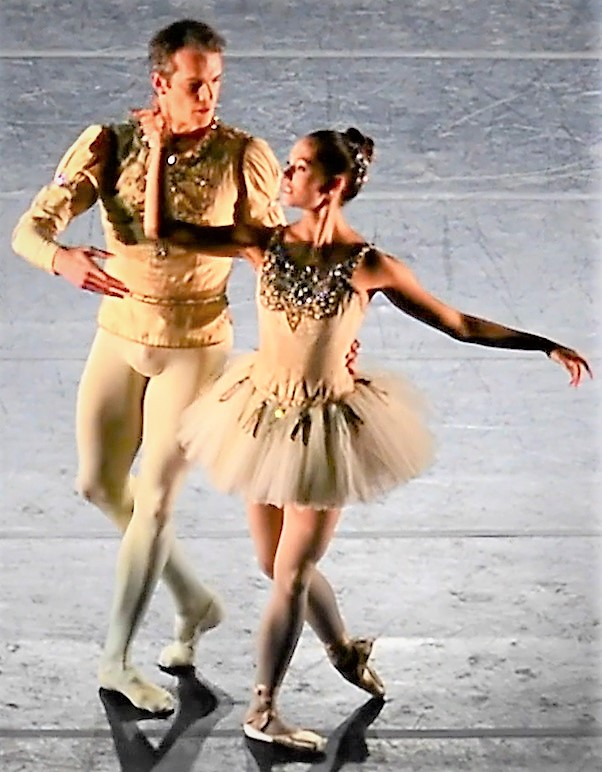
- Phelan (right) with Russell Janzen in Jewels, 2017
- Born: Unity Sickles Phelan; February 1995 (age 31); Princeton, New Jersey, U.S.
- Education: School of American Ballet; Fordham University
- Occupation: Ballet dancer
- Years active: 2012–present
- Height: 5 ft 8 in (173 cm)
- Spouse: Cameron Dieck (m. 2022)
- Dancing career
- Current group: New York City Ballet

Unity Sickles Phelan (born February 1995) is an American ballet dancer. She joined the New York City Ballet in 2013 and was promoted to principal dancer in 2021. Outside of the company, she has also danced in the films John Wick: Chapter 3 – Parabellum (2019) and I'm Thinking of Ending Things (2020).

== Early life and training ==
Phelan was born in Princeton, New Jersey. Her father founded a health service company, where he was also the chief executive, and her mother is an international tax consultant and partner at a national public accounting and business advisory firm. Phelan explained that her parents liked the idea of "unity", hence her unusual first name.

Phelan started ballet at age four at Princeton Ballet School, following her older sister. At thirteen, she attended the summer program at the School of American Ballet in New York, and was invited to join the year-round program. Her parents thought she was too young, but allowed her to train there full-time the following year. She trained at the school for three years. During this time, she also completed high school at the Professional Children's School, and graduated in 2012.

== Career ==
Phelan became an apprentice with the New York City Ballet in 2012, and joined the corps de ballet the following year. Roles she danced whilst in the corps de ballet include in Balanchine's "Stairway to Paradise" in Who Cares?, Episodes, first pas de trois in Agon and a demi-soloist in Symphony in Three Movements. In 2015, she made her debut as the Sugar Plum Fairy in Balanchine's The Nutcracker. In 2016, she was chosen by choreographer Christopher Wheeldon to create a lead role in American Rhapsody, and by Lauren Lovette in For Clara. Later that year, she debuted as Dewdrop in The Nutcracker. The following year, she originated a role in Pontus Lidberg's The Shimmering Asphalt.

Phelan was promoted to soloist in 2017. Since then, she has danced featured roles, including in "Emerald" from Jewels, A Midsummer Night's Dream, Liebeslieder Walzer, Orpheus, Divertimento No. 15; Robbins' Dances at a Gathering, In G Major and Antique Epigraphs; Wheeldon's Polyphonia and DGV: Danse à Grande Vitesse; and Forsythe's Herman Schmermen. She has also created roles in Peck's Easy, Lovette's The Shaded Line and Ratmansky's Voices.

In 2017, she performed a pas de deux in Balanchine's Agon with then-American Ballet Theatre soloist Calvin Royal III, with Arthur Mitchell, who originated Royal's role, in the audience. Following the performance, Mitchell commented the ballet was "in good hands." The following year, after Mitchell's death, Royal and Phelan reprised the Agon pas de deux at his memorial. The same year, following the collaboration between New York City Ballet and Puma, she took part in the latter's promotional tour in Asia.

Phelan appeared in the 2019 film, John Wick: Chapter 3 – Parabellum, as a ballerina who is also training to be an assassin, with the dance sequences choreographed by Tiler Peck. She then appeared in a dream ballet sequence in the 2020 film, I'm Thinking of Ending Things, choreographed by Peter Walker. In 2020, she was featured in a campaign for Gabriela Hearst. Later that year, she danced in Andrea Miller's short film, New Song, which was made for the New York City Ballet.

In 2021, Phelan was promoted to principal dancer. Her promotion came soon after the company return to performing after the COVID-19 pandemic, as well as multiple principal dancers' retirements. Ballets she performed since her promotion include Balanchine's Agon, Tschaikovsky Pas de Deux, (Note: At the New York City Ballet, the composer's last name is spelled "Tschaikovsky" rather than "Tchaikovsky" as he used the former spelling during a visit to New York in 1891.) Apollo (as Terpsichore), Symphony in C, Stravinsky Violin Concerto, Vienna Waltzes, La Sonnambula (as the Sleepwalker), A Midsummer Night's Dream (as Titania), Swan Lake, and Robbins' Piano Pieces. In 2022, she originated a role in Roberts' Emanon — in Two Movements. She stars as a ballerina in a fictional New York City ballet company in Étoile, a 2025 television series created by Amy Sherman-Palladino and Daniel Palladino.

Phelan (with Preston Chamblee) performed in performed Christopher Wheeldon's This Bitter Earth in environmental dance nonprofit vildwerk.'s inaugural season at El Museo del Barrio in 2024. vildwerk. aims to increase environmental conservation awareness through dance.

== Personal life ==
While dancing full-time, Phelan also studied at Fordham University. She graduated in 2020, with a bachelor's degree in economics and organizational leadership.

In 2022, Phelan married Cameron Dieck, a former New York City Ballet dancer. They welcomed their first child, a son, in January 2026.

== Filmography ==
Year	Title	Role	Ref
2019	John Wick: Chapter 3 – Parabellum	Rooney / The Ballerina	
2020	I'm Thinking of Ending Things	Dancing Young Woman	
2025	Étoile	Julie	
