= World Ballet Company =

American ballet organization

- Type: Private
- Industry: Performing arts
- Founded: 2015; 11 years ago in Los Angeles, California
- Founders: Sasha Gorskaya; Gulya Hartwick
- Headquarters: Los Angeles, United States
- Area served: United States
- Services: Ballet productions Touring performances Dance education
- Website: worldballetcompany.com

World Ballet Company (WBC) is a Los Angeles-based performing arts organization that produces and tours classical and original full-length ballets across North America. It operates under Gorskaya-Hartwick Productions.

== History ==
World Ballet Company was founded in 2015 by Sasha Gorskaya and Gulya Hartwick and began touring the United States later that year. Gorskaya had previously worked in production for the Eurovision Song Contest, while Hartwick had a background in psychology and fashion journalism.

In January 2024, WBC launched the World Ballet Festival, a touring mixed-repertoire program, which featured guest performers including Tiler Peck and Roman Mejia of New York City Ballet, Sasha De Sola and Aaron Robison of San Francisco Ballet, and Rasmus Ahlgren of Boston Ballet. The inaugural festival was held in June 2024 in Minneapolis, San Diego, Detroit, and Spokane.

== Productions ==
=== Swan Lake ===
Swan Lake entered the WBC's repertory under the World Ballet Series banner in September 2022. It premiered at the Bank of America Performing Arts Center in Thousand Oaks, California, on September 14 as part of a 52-city U.S. tour.

Set to Pyotr Ilyich Tchaikovsky's score, the production features choreography by Marius Petipa, revised and restaged by Nadezhda Kalinina. Sergey Novikov designed the hand-painted scenery and more than 150 costumes, while Irina Strukova created the special-effects makeup. Sasha Gorskaya and Gulya Hartwick produced the work through Gorskaya-Hartwick Productions.

Since 2024, selected performances of Swan Lake have featured live orchestra accompaniment under the direction of conductor Vadim Nikitin. During the 2026–2027 season, the production is scheduled to tour 56 cities across 21 U.S. states with an international cast.

=== The Nutcracker ===
The Nutcracker debuted under the World Ballet Series banner at the Palace Theater in Waterbury, Connecticut, on November 25, 2022.

Set to Tchaikovsky's score, the production combines Lev Ivanov's original choreography with additional staging by George Birkadze and Marina Kesler. Novikov designed the scenery and costumes, Mark Stavtsev designed the lighting, and Gorskaya and Hartwick produced the work through Gorskaya-Hartwick Productions. During the 2026–2027 season, the production is scheduled to tour 48 cities across 23 U.S. states. Selected performances feature live orchestra accompaniment.

=== Cinderella ===
Cinderella entered the World Ballet Series repertory in 2023, with a premiere performance at the Clark Center in Arroyo Grande, California, on February 15. The production later toured more than 130 U.S. cities that year.

Set to Sergei Prokofiev's score, the ballet was choreographed by Kesler and performed by a multinational ensemble. Novikov designed the hand-painted scenery and costumes, while Gorskaya and Hartwick produced the work through Gorskaya-Hartwick Productions.

In 2026, the production was restaged to music by Johann Strauss.

=== The Great Gatsby ===
The Great Gatsby Ballet premiered in California on February 6, 2025, before touring more than 140 U.S. cities through November 24.

Adapted from F. Scott Fitzgerald's novel, the production was choreographed by Ilya Zhivoy to a libretto by Gorskaya and an original jazz-influenced score by Anna Drubich. Novikov designed the sets, Sonya Vartanyan designed the costumes. The broadway-style production combines neoclassical dance, live singing, acrobatics, and multimedia effects.

=== Sleeping Beauty ===
The Sleeping Beauty is scheduled to premiere during WBC's 2026–27 season. Announced performances include the Curran Theatre in San Francisco on February 7, 2027, with The Sleeping Beauty tour spanning 18 U.S. states from California to Florida.
