= Giles Deacon =

British fashion designer

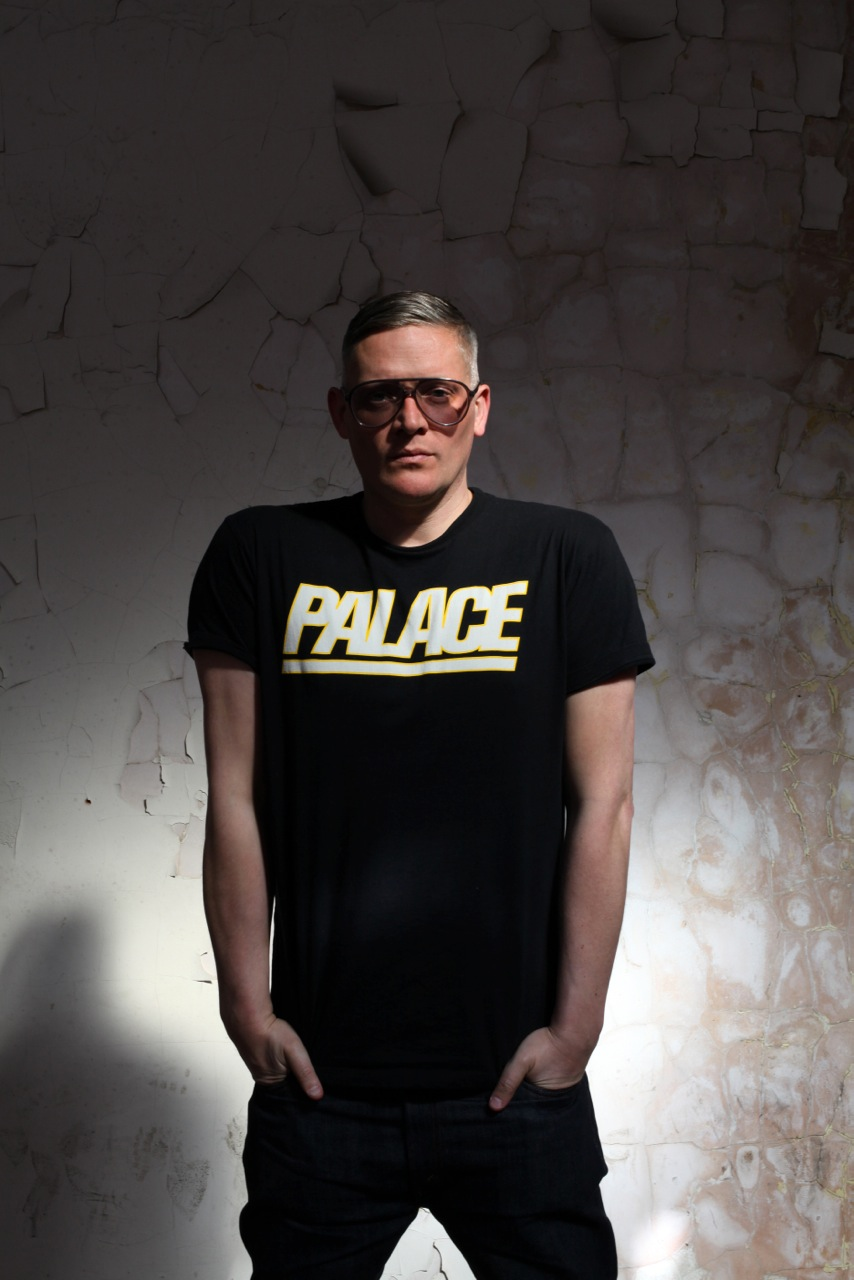
- Deacon photographed by Gautier Deblonde
- Born: 14 December 1969 (age 56); Darlington, County Durham, England
- Labels: Giles Deacon Couture; GILES
- Partner: Gwendoline Christie (2014–present)
- Awards: British Fashion Designer of the Year 2006; ANDAM Fashion Awards Grand Prix 2009

Giles David Deacon (born 14 December 1969) is a British fashion designer, illustrator, creative director and founder of Giles Deacon group, a fashion enterprise. Deacon joined the Paris Fashion Week in 2016. Deacon has been known to challenge the traditional ideas of womenswear and often uses wild prints and pop culture references in his designs. Deacon was employed by the fashion houses Bottega Veneta and Gucci, before founding his own label, GILES, in 2003. He launched his first collection for GILES at the 2004 London Fashion Week and was named "Best New Designer" at the British Fashion Awards. Deacon's designs have been met with critical acclaim and have sparked a renewed interest in London fashion. Having become one of the fashion industry's most fêted figures, Deacon was named British Fashion Designer of the Year in 2006 and was awarded the French ANDAM Fashion Award's Grand Prix in 2009.

He was creative director of French fashion house Ungaro from April 2010 until September 2011. Deacon also became known for his multiple collaborations, illustrations and ink drawings. After placing his ready-to-wear line on hiatus, he launched his first couture collection in 2016 in Paris and continues to make one-off pieces for clients. He was appointed design director of luxury leather goods brand Aspinal of London in 2018, following a successful collaboration. Deacon moved into interior design in 2020, after teaming up with luxury linens brand Peter Reed and Matches Fashion. He has since collaborated with British design company Sanderson on a range of wallpaper and fabrics. Deacon succeeded Simon Holloway as creative director of James Purdey & Sons in 2024.

== Early life ==
Deacon was born in Darlington, County Durham, but grew up near Ullswater in the Lake District. Deacon is the youngest child of David, an agricultural salesman, and Judith, a housewife. He has one older sister. He attended Barnard Castle School in County Durham which he credits with instilling in him "the mindset of aesthetics". Alongside schoolmate and friend Glenn Hugill, now a major television executive, he pursued interests in music and film as "portal to other things that we didn't really know about" Deacon initially wanted to become a marine biologist, but he failed his chemistry A-level. He later joined Harrogate College of Arts, where he completed an art foundation course. After completing his course he went on to study at Central St Martins and was in the same class as fashion designers Alexander McQueen and Luella Bartley. He graduated in 1992 and began collaborating on the label 'Doran Deacon' with his friend, Fi Doran as well as contributing illustrations to Dazed & Confused.

== Career ==
=== 1990s–2011 ===
Deacon chose to travel and gain experiences at fashion houses, before starting his own label. During his time in Paris, Deacon was hired to work with fashion designer Jean-Charles de Castelbajac, where he learned how to use a brand name commercially. He returned to London in 1994, where he began freelancing and taking on various jobs, including illustration work and making television props. Grand asked Deacon to help her with "reinvigorating" Italian luxury goods house, Bottega Veneta, and he was hired to work for the company, becoming the head designer and debuting an acclaimed collection in 2001. Deacon was dismissed in 2001 when the Gucci group bought the company and terminated his contract, so they could hire German designer, Tomas Maier. However, he was immediately hired by Tom Ford to assist with Gucci womenswear. Deacon was forced to leave Gucci after one season when he became ill from an infected salivary gland.

Once he had recovered, Deacon decided to take out a loan to start his own label and he launched GILES in 2003. He launched his first collection at London Fashion Week in February 2004, styled by his friend Katie Grand, the show saw models Karen Elson, Lily Cole, Eva Herzigova and Linda Evangelista walking the catwalk. The collection received international acclaim and began a renewed interest in London fashion. Deacon regularly showed at London Fashion Week and the GILES collection is bought by over thirty retail stores including Barneys, Harvey Nichols and Selfridges. Deacon counted Thandiwe Newton, Princess Beatrice and Scarlett Johansson among his clients. Several actresses, including Cate Blanchett and Kerry Washington, have worn Deacon's dresses at red carpet events. In 2009, Deacon stated that since he launched his label, he has seen the turnover double every year and sales increased during the 2008 recession. He moved his studio to The Old Truman Brewery in East London in 2009, where he created his couture pieces, while the ready-to-wear collection was made in Italy.

In April 2010, it was announced that Deacon had been appointed the creative director position with Ungaro, following the dismissal of Estrella Archs. Deacon became the fifth designer to be hired by the house since it was sold to entrepreneur Asim Abdullah in 2005. On 19 September 2010, Deacon made a return to London Fashion Week, after spending two years showing his collection in Paris. Deacon showed his first collection for Ungaro in October 2010. Vogue previewed the new collection, which was designed by Deacon, styled by Grand and accessorised by Katie Hillier and Stephen Jones, on their website. Vogue reporter, Dolly Jones, described the collection as one of the "most hotly anticipated shows" of the week and she added "[Deacon] looks like he'll be credited with bringing the house of Ungaro back to life, at last."

From June 2011, Deacon took part in the Channel 4 entertainment series, New Look Style the Nation. The designer joined New Look's creative director Barbara Horspool on a panel tasked with finding an "exceptional new fashion stylist" from contestants, who demonstrate good creativity and style. The winner was to be hired by New Look as a stylist. Deacon previously appeared on Britain's Next Top Model as a judge. On 15 September, it was announced Ungaro and Deacon had "mutually decided" to end their collaboration.

=== 2012–present ===
Deacon created Abbey Clancy's wedding dress in 2012. Clancy previously walked in one of Deacon's shows. In 2013, Deacon presented the first ever fashion exhibition at the William Morris Gallery in London. He decided to put his ready-to-wear line on hiatus, after showing his last collection in 2015, in order to focus on couture. He explained: "I remember working out the numbers we needed to carry on, and I realised my heart was in the world of making couture, rather than committing to another licence. I never wanted a billion-dollar business. It was about quality of life and, also, sustainability — in every respect." Deacon launched his first couture collection in 2016. He told Steff Yotka of Vogue that he had always wanted to create more couture pieces, and that he chose to concentrate on high end fashion after realising that the pieces he and his team had produced were selling well. Deacon also makes ready-to-wear pieces for private clients and has become known for his illustrations and ink drawings.

He designed the wedding dress of Pippa Middleton, sister of Catherine, Princess of Wales, in May 2017. In addition to Giles Deacon Couture, whose clients include actors Billy Porter and Sarah Jessica Parker, Deacon began teaching at the Royal College of Art and branched out into interior design with a collection of tablecloths and napkins with luxury linens brand Peter Reed and e-commerce platform Matches Fashion in 2020. The collection enabled Deacon to reach new customers outside of fashion and he began receiving bespoke commission requests. Deacon later moved to a studio situated on the roof of a warehouse in Dalston, where he has a team of five people working with him.

Amidst the COVID-19 pandemic in 2021, Deacon created a capsule collection of "wonky WFA (work from anywhere) outfits". After lockdown restrictions were lifted, he visited several IWG plc workspaces while researching what workers were wearing in the office, which included relaxed, looser clothing. His collection reflected that with comfortable and adaptable "short suits, loose dresses and trousers". The following year, Deacon was invited to design a piece for the New York City Ballet. Deacon designed the costumes for choreographer Kyle Abraham's Love Letter (on shuffle), which had its world premiere at the Fall Fashion Gala. With this, Deacon became the first British designer to repeat the role of guest designer at the New York City Ballet, after he created the costumes for Abraham's ballet The Runaway in 2018.

In conjunction with Tiffany & Co., Deacon created a blue dress for Beyoncé's 2023 Renaissance World Tour. He continued his foray into interiors with the Sanderson x Giles Deacon collection in collaboration with British design company Sanderson. In April 2024, he launched a line of wallpapers, fabrics, pillows and table linens at an event held in Chateau Marmont, Los Angeles. His collection incorporates classic patterns from the company's archives, as well as a signature stripe motif, called the Aperigon sawtooth stripe. In July 2024, Deacon succeeded Simon Holloway as creative director of clothing and accessories at British gunmaker James Purdey & Sons. The following year, he curated a new exhibition for the Christmas season at Soho House 40 Greek Street, titled The Gilded Mischief. The house was turned into an 18th-century salon, featuring fabrics from Deacon's collection with Sanderson and his own illustrations on the walls.

==== Style ====
Hopefully, if you saw someone wearing one of our frocks you'd think she looks quite interesting to have a chat with and say hello to. They're a bit 'We're on, we're out, we mean business.

— Deacon on his designs.

Deacon has been known to challenge the traditional ideas of womenswear and often uses wild prints and pop culture references in his designs. He has described his designs for GILES as humorous, dark and sexy and has stated that he wants diversity in among them. He said, "My dresses should be worn by young, cool girls just as much as by 55 to 60-year-old women". Deacon often designs "structured big-entrance" dresses, which are aimed at women who want to be noticed. At the 2008 London Fashion Week, Deacon presented a collection with a futuristic theme based on the 1980s arcade game Pac-Man. The character was embellished on many of the dresses and the models wore oversized helmets in the shape of Pac-Man. The designer's New Look menswear collections have been described by GQ magazine as "straddling the line between quirky and wearable".

Susannah Frankel of The Independent has said that Deacon's collections are "a much-needed injection of grand-scale glamour". Frankel added that a playfulness and humour have also found their way into Deacon's collections. In May 2011, Deacon said he does not design for wallflowers and that his collections would always be a "little bit sideways", "quirky" and "British in feel." The Scotsman said Deacon's designs are not brash, but "they suit a woman who has the confidence to take centre-stage." In February 2024, Mark C O'Flaherty stated that the clothes Deacon creates "are for women appearing in what can be quite an aggressive spotlight, aiming to both project and deflect."

==== Collaborations ====
Deacon has worked on many collaborations with companies including Sky, Converse and Evoke, with whom he created his first jewellery collection. In a two-season collaboration with British fashion company Mulberry, Deacon introduced a line of accessories called "Mulberry for Giles", which was both a commercial and critical success. Deacon was then appointed to design for the classic British tailoring label, Daks. He showed his first and second collections for the brand in 2007 and his third in 2008.

Deacon's best known collaboration has been with the High Street fashion chain New Look. The collection called Gold by Giles began in March 2007. On choosing to collaborate with the clothing retailer, Deacon said: "I chose New Look as the high street store to work with, as we both have a sense of fun and believe in fashion for everyone." Actress Drew Barrymore starred in the first ad campaigns for the collection, following a chance meeting between her and the designer in a lift. British model, Agyness Deyn took over and modelled the key pieces for Deacon's 4th collection.

Deacon collaborated with Cadbury on a limited edition collection for their Dairy Milk Caramel Nibbles. He created a strapless white tulip dress with ruffles and a chocolate polka-dot print, complete with a pussy-bow neck tie for the Caramel Bunny character. In addition to this, he created a limited edition scarf combining the Cadbury Caramel Bunny's eyes with coloured chains and pink bows, which was available from an online boutique for free.

In late 2015, Deacon designed a womenswear collection for Debenhams. The collection titled Giles Deacon for Edition was modelled by Daisy Lowe and featured "beautiful dresses, bold prints and luxe outerwear".

Since 2018, Deacon has collaborated with the luxury leather goods and accessories brand Aspinal of London. The first collection featured hand-drawn illustrations of Deacon's "Aspinal Girls", which were his interpretation of the women who embody the brand. Pieces included clutch bags, a hat box, bowling bag and tote. Following the success of the collaboration, Deacon was appointed as design director working alongside Mariya Dykalo. In 2024, Deacon worked with ceramics company 1882 Ltd to create The Walla Crag Venus bone china figurine. Deacon hand painted the piece, which was chosen by fellow designer Patrick Grant for The Guardian's "Design highlights 2024".

== Recognition ==
In 2004, Deacon was named Best New Designer at the British Fashion Awards and in the following year he was given the Young Designer Award at Elle magazine's Style Awards. 2006 saw Deacon win the British Fashion Council's Fashion Forward Award, as well as being named British Fashion Designer of the Year at the British Fashion Awards. He was named Best British Designer at the 2007 Elle Style Awards. Two years later, Deacon won the French ANDAM Fashion Award's Grand Prix, becoming the second consecutive British designer to win the award following Gareth Pugh's win in 2008. In the same year, he was named GQ magazine's Designer of the Year. Some of Deacon's clothing pieces are held in collections at the Victoria & Albert Museum and the Metropolitan Museum of Art in New York City. In 2024, the Sanderson x Giles Deacon collection won the Collaboration Award at the Country & Town House Interiors Awards.

== Personal life ==
Deacon divides his time between his home in Islington, London, and his apartments in Paris and Italy. He has been in a relationship with actress Gwendoline Christie since 2013, after meeting through mutual friends. Christie has worn several of Deacon's designs at red carpet events. He also created her wardrobe for her role as Lucifer in The Sandman, as well as two dresses that she wore onstage during a production of A Midsummer Night's Dream.

Deacon's hobbies include swimming, hiking, macramé, and gardening. He counts Elsa Schiaparelli, Miuccia Prada, Coco Chanel, Mr J.M. Millet, and Yves Saint Laurent among his design and style inspirations.
