= Roman Mejia =

American ballet dancer (born 1999)

- Born: November 30, 1999 (age 25); Fort Worth, Texas, U.S.
- Education: School of American Ballet
- Occupation: Ballet dancer
- Years active: 2017–present
- Partner(s): Tiler Peck (2020–present; married 6/21/25 in New York City)
- Career
- Current group: New York City Ballet

Roman Mejia (born November 30, 1999) is an American ballet dancer. He joined the New York City Ballet in 2017, and was promoted to principal dancer in February 2023.

== Early life and education ==
Mejia was born in Fort Worth, Texas. Both of his parents were ballet dancers. His father, Paul Mejia, who is Peruvian-American, was a dancer at the New York City Ballet (NYCB) during the 1960s.

Mejia started dancing at age three at the Metropolitan Classical Ballet, where his father was a co-artistic director. His parents began training him and his sister in the Balanchine technique. When he was 12, Mejia became interested in attending the School of American Ballet (SAB), NYCB's school, and, in 2014, at age 14, he was accepted into SAB's summer program. He returned the following summer, then was accepted into the school full-time. He graduated in 2017.

== Career ==
In August 2017, Mejia performed at the Vail Dance Festival in Vail, Colorado, in Balanchine's Tarantella, opposite NYCB principal dancer Lauren Lovette, and in the world premiere of Matthew Neenan's Farewell. The opportunity came about when the festival's director Damian Woetzel asked NYCB principal dancer Tiler Peck about new talents, and she had spotted him at SAB. Mejia began his apprenticeship at NYCB later that month, and joined the company as a member of the corps de ballet three months later. He soon took on featured roles, including in Balanchine's Allegro Brillante, A Midsummer Night's Dream (as Puck), The Nutcracker (as Candy Cane), and Western Symphony, as well as Robbins' Dances at a Gathering, Fancy Free, and The Four Seasons. He originated roles in Kyle Abraham's The Runaway, Alexei Ratmansky's Voices, Edwaard Liang's Lineage, and Gianna Reisen's Composer's Holiday.

Mejia also returned to Vail each summer, where he danced Ratmansky's Fandango, which was originally choreographed for a woman, and originated roles for Tiler Peck and Alonzo King. During the COVID-19 pandemic, he worked with choreographer William Forsythe and dancers Peck, Brooklyn Mack and Lex Ishimoto on The Barre Project (Blake Works II). The performance was filmed in an empty theatre and released online in 2021.

In October 2021, soon after NYCB resumed performing after the pandemic, Mejia was named soloist. He took on more featured roles, including in Balanchine's "Rubies" from Jewels, A Midsummer Night's Dream (as Oberon), The Nutcracker (as the Cavalier), Robbins' Piano Pieces, and Martins' The Sleeping Beauty (as Bluebird and Gold). He originated roles in Justin Peck's Partita and Silas Farley's Architects of Time.

Outside of the New York City Ballet, in 2021, he appeared in Twyla Tharp's Twyla Now program at the New York City Center, dancing in Cornbread and All In. In 2022, he appeared in Tiler Peck's program at the City Center, dancing in King's Swift Arrow and Forsythe's The Barre Project (Blake Works II). He was also an artist in residence at the 2022 Vail Dance Festival.

In February 2023, Mejia was promoted to principal dancer at NYCB.
