= Ocean's Kingdom (ballet) =

Ballet choreographed by Peter Martins

Ocean's Kingdom is a ballet choreographed by Peter Martins for the New York City Ballet to eponymous music and libretto by Paul McCartney. The work's premiere took place on 22 September 2011 at the Fall Gala in the David H. Koch Theater, Lincoln Center.

== Synopsis ==
=== Movement I: Ocean's Kingdom ===
The Princess Honorata lives with her father, King Ocean, in an underwater kingdom. In charge of her handmaidens is the somewhat sinister character Scala. Their idyllic existence is one day interrupted by intruders from the earthly kingdom, ruled by King Terra. He arrives with his band of aggressive followers and his younger brother Prince Stone. They are there to deliver an invitation to a grand ball. Prince Stone begins to fall in love with Princess Honorata.

=== Movement II: Hall of Dance ===
Guests arrive at the grand Hall of Dance and are treated to a spectacle of acrobatic dancing. Wandering through their midst are three drunken lords. King Ocean and Honorata arrive and, once again, encounter King Terra's unruly retinue. The attraction between Stone and Honorarta becomes stronger as the rivalry between the dancers becomes more intense. At the end of the dance, unnoticed by Prince Stone and King Ocean, Honorata is kidnapped by King Terra, who secretly desires her himself, and his henchmen by the aid of the treacherous Scala.

=== Movement III: Imprisonment ===
Princess Honorata despairs of her fate as she is seen imprisoned in Terra's run-down palace. Prince Stone arrives, furious at Terra's actions and Scala's betrayal. He demands Honorata's release but is rebuffed by Terra. Scala realizes she was wrong to turn against her mistress and promises to aid Prince Stone with Honorata's release. The two lovers are reunited and fall into a passionate embrace before escaping.

=== Movement IV: Moonrise ===
As the moon rises outside Terra's palace, Scala, Honorata and Stone escape into the night. They are soon pursued by Terra and his warriors. Against the wishes of the lovers, Scala turns back to stop the advancing army, and though she is ignored by them she magically conjures up a storm which envelopes and destroys them. To the horror of Honorata and Stone, Scala also perishes. They escape and are met by friendly forces from the Ocean Kingdom. They return home in triumph and as the celebrations subside and the lovers are left alone, the spirit of Scala makes a final appearance to bless their union.

== Cast ==
=== Original ===
Role	Cast members	
Honorata and Prince Stone	Sara Mearns	Robert Fairchild
Scala and King Terra	Georgina Pazcoguin	Amar Ramasar
King Ocean	Christian Tworzyanski	Christian Tworzyanski
The Entertainers' Leader	Daniel Ulbricht	Daniel Ulbricht
Pas de deux (Exotic Couple)	Megan LeCrone	Craig Hall
Amazons and Drunken Lords	Savannah Lowery; Emily Kikta	Allen Peiffer; Anthony Huxley; David Prottas
Water Maidens	Likolani Brown; Amanda Hankes; Lauren King; Ashley Laracey; Brittany Pollack; Sarah Villwock	
Handmaidens	Sara Adams; Callie Bachman; Meagan Mann; Jenelle Manzi; Mary Elizabeth Sell	
Terra Punks		Devin Alberda; Daniel Applebaum; Harrison Ball; Joseph Gordon; Sam Greenberg; Ralph Ippolito; Austin Laurent; Vincent Paradiso; Aaron Sanz; Taylor Stanley; Giovanni Villalobos; Peter Walker
Courtiers	Marika Anderson; Stephanie Chosniak; Emilie Gerrity; Dana Jacobson; Shoshona Rosenfield; Gretchen Smith; Lara Tong; Lydia Wellington	Cameron Dieck; Russell Janzen; Andrew Scordato; Joshua Thew
