= James Purdey & Sons =

British gunmaker in London (1814–)

Coordinates: 51°30′34.3″N 0°9′7.11″W

James Purdey & Sons Limited
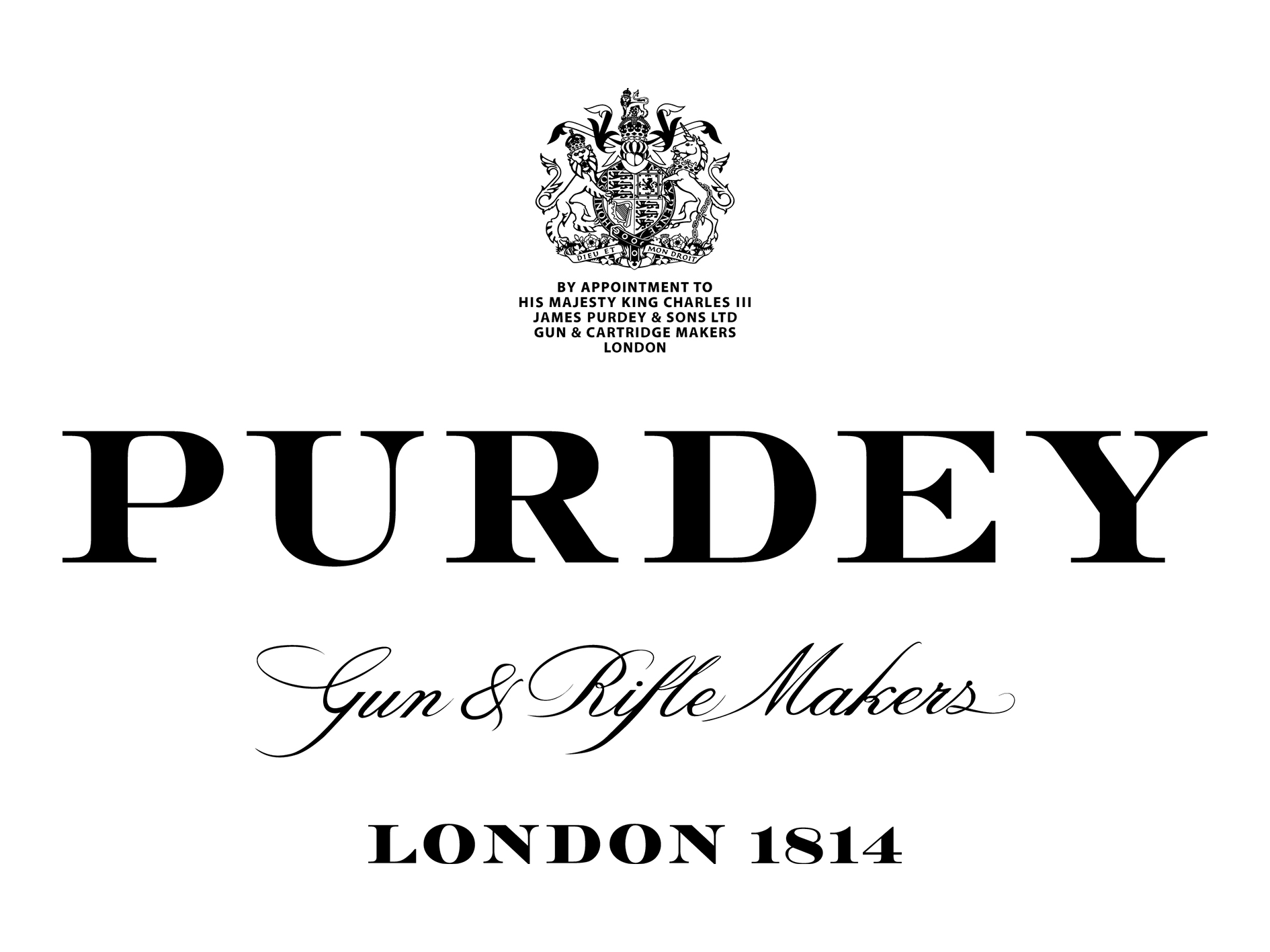
- Purdey Gun & Rifle Makers sign
- Type: Subsidiary
- Industry: Gun manufacturing; Clothing retailing
- Founded: London (1814; 212 years ago)
- Founder: James Purdey
- Headquarters: London, England
- Area served: Worldwide
- Key people: Dan Jago, Chairman
- Products: Side-by-side shotguns; Over-and-under shotguns; Double rifles; Bolt-action rifles
- Services: Repair; Storage
- Number of employees: 100
- Parent: Richemont
- Website: Purdey gun and rifle makers

James Purdey & Sons, or simply Purdey, is a British gunmaker based in London, England. It specialises in high-end bespoke sporting shotguns and rifles. Purdey holds Royal Warrants of appointment as gun and rifle makers to the British and other European royal families.

== History ==
James Purdey was born in Whitechapel in 1784 and apprenticed to his brother-in-law, Thomas Keck Hutchinson. After completing his training, he worked for both Joseph Manton and the Rev. Alexander Forsyth before establishing his own company in London in 1814. He located his business on Princes Street, now Wardour Street, near Leicester Square.

In 1826, the company moved from Princes Street to Manton's former premises at 314-315 Oxford Street. Due to a numbering conflict, the business used the address '314½ Oxford Street' from 1827.

The founder's son, James Purdey the Younger, took over the running of the company from his father in 1858. James the Younger saw rapid change in the development and design of guns and rifles during his lifetime, essentially moving from muzzle loading flintlocks in the 1820s to breech loading hammerless ejectors by the 1890s. James the Younger was always at the forefront of advances in the design and manufacture of his guns and rifles, and he secured several patents for technical innovations over the years. These included the famous 'Purdey Bolts' locking system, and his concealed third "bite" (square notch that holds the side-by-side barrels closed). Both remain in production today, and other gunmakers have adopted these features.

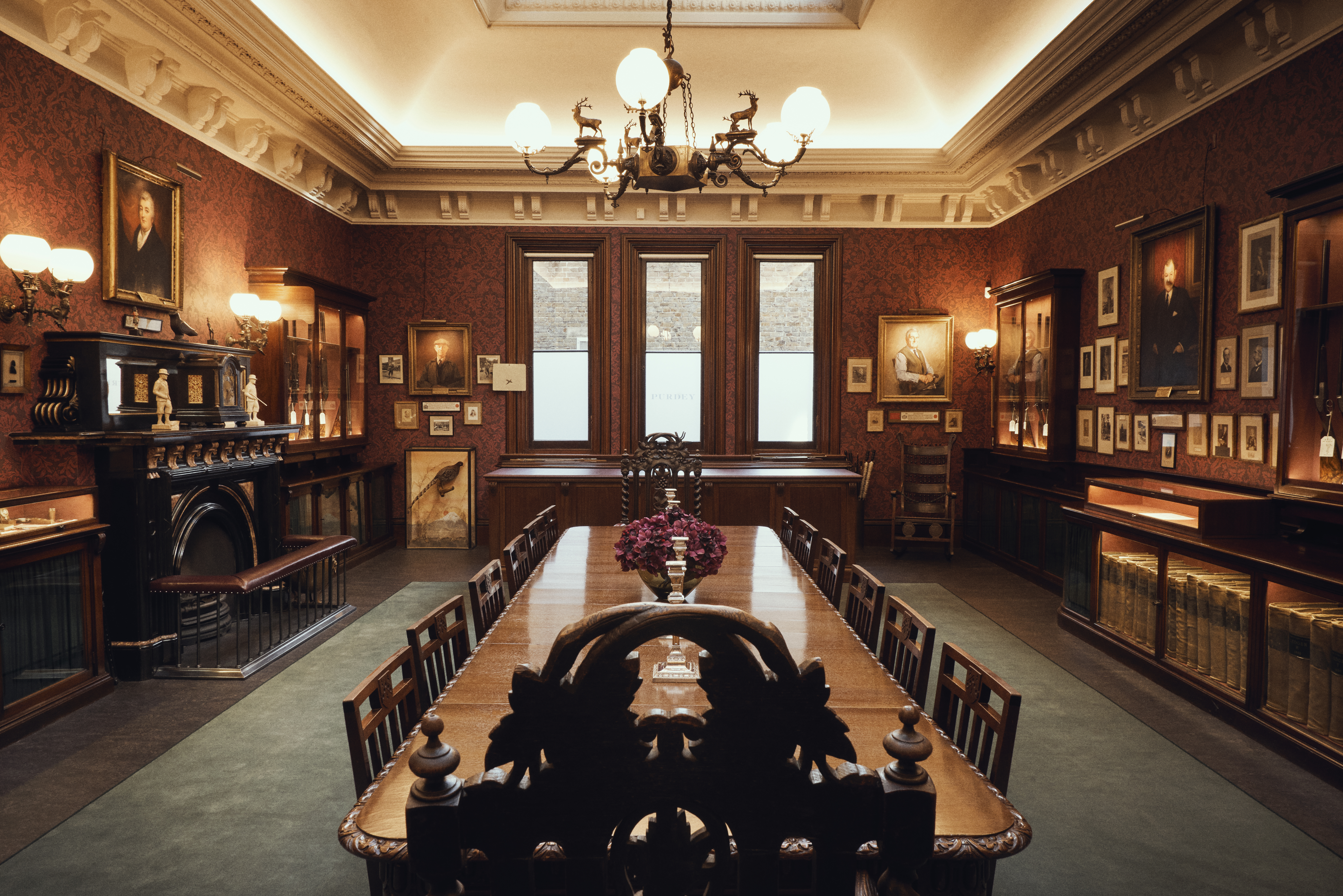
The historic Long Room, located at James Purdey and Sons' Audley House

In 1878, James the Younger took two of his sons into the business, renaming it James Purdey & Sons. In 1882, the company moved from Oxford Street to new premises at 57-58 South Audley Street, on the corner with Mount Street, where the company remains today. James the Younger designed this building to house his showroom and factory, and later it provided living quarters for James' family. The City of Westminster unveiled a memorial plaque on the shop at 57-60 South Audley Street on 30 April 1992.

Purdey introduced their self-opening hammerless gun in 1880. Designed by Frederick Beesley, a former Purdey craftsman, his hammerless self-opening mechanism uses one limb of a V-spring to operate the internal hammers and the other to operate the self-opening feature. This action was modified in 1888 by incorporating William Wem's ejector design. Apart from occasional refinement and the optional single trigger mechanism, very little change has subsequently been made to the design of the side-by-side gun.

In 1900, Athol Purdey took over from his father and ran the business through the prosperous Edwardian years, as well as supervising Purdey's manufacturing of sniper rifles and aerial gunnery sights for the War Office during World War I. Athol's sons, James and Tom, both of whom had served in France, joined the firm in the 1920s.

== Ownership changes ==
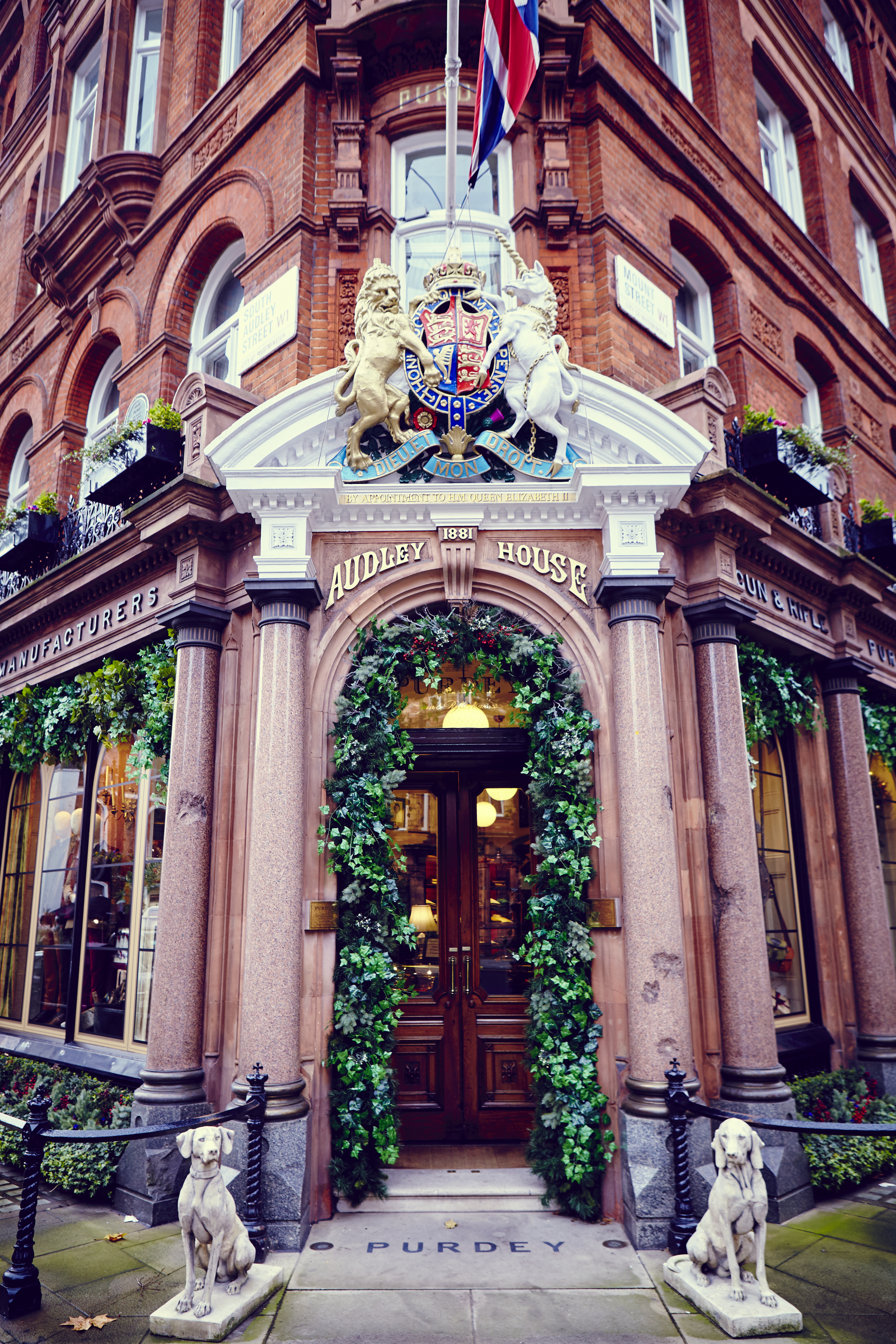
James Purdey & Sons Ltd. in Audley House on South Audley Street, in London's Mayfair

On 2 October 1925, James Purdey & Sons became a limited company, taking on investment from Jim Purdey's in-laws, the Oliver family. Athol Purdey continued to run the business until 1929, when Tom succeeded him. In 1935, the Oliver family sold their shares to Sir Wyndham Portal and Major Godfrey Miller-Mundy, who in turn sold them to John Cobbold in November 1943. Sadly, he was killed when a V1 bomb hit the Guard's Chapel on 18 June 1944. In 1946, Tom Purdey convinced Hugh Seely, 1st Baron Sherwood, to purchase the shares, eventually passing them to his nephew, the Hon. Richard Beaumont. Tom Purdey remained the chairman of the company until his retirement in 1955 due to ill health, with day-to-day management of the company being handled by the Managing Director, Harry Lawrence. Richard Beaumont became chairman of the company in 1970, and in 1994, upon deciding to retire, sold James Purdey & Sons Ltd to Compagnie Financière Richemont SA.

Richard Purdey, the sixth generation of the founder's family, was appointed chairman of the company in 1997 and retired in February 2007. Nigel Beaumont, Richard Beaumont's cousin, took over as chairman until his retirement in 2014. He was followed by James Horne, who was succeeded in December 2019 by the current Chairman, Dan Jago. Richard Purdey's daughter, Annika, the seventh generation of the founder's family, currently sits on the company's board as a non-executive director.

== Royal clientele ==
As early as 1838, Queen Victoria is recorded as having bought a pair of Purdey pistols, followed by her husband, Prince Albert, in 1840. The company also supplied guns and rifles to most European royal houses and to various Indian rulers.

=== Warrants ===
The company was granted its first Royal Warrant in 1868 by The Prince of Wales, later King Edward VII. This was followed by Queen Victoria, who awarded her warrant in 1878. Purdey continued to hold warrants from their successors, as well as for other European Royal houses, including King Alfonso XIII of Spain and King Gustav V of Sweden. Following the coronation in 1954, both Queen Elizabeth II and The Duke of Edinburgh awarded their warrants to the company. In May 2024, Purdey was granted a Royal Warrant by King Charles III, continuing over 150 years of service to the British Royal Family.

=== Royal Miniature Guns ===
Purdey has built two pairs of miniature guns for the British Royal Family. The first were commissioned for Queen Mary's Dolls' House in 1923, and were non-working 1:12-scale replicas of the company's side-by-side shotguns. These were displayed in the library of the Dolls' House on the instructions of King George V. To mark his Silver Jubilee in 1935, Purdey built a pair of fully-working miniature hammer guns, based on the King's favourite pair. These were 1:6 scale and presented in a silver-gilt case made by the King's jewellers, Garrard & Co.

== Guns & Rifles ==
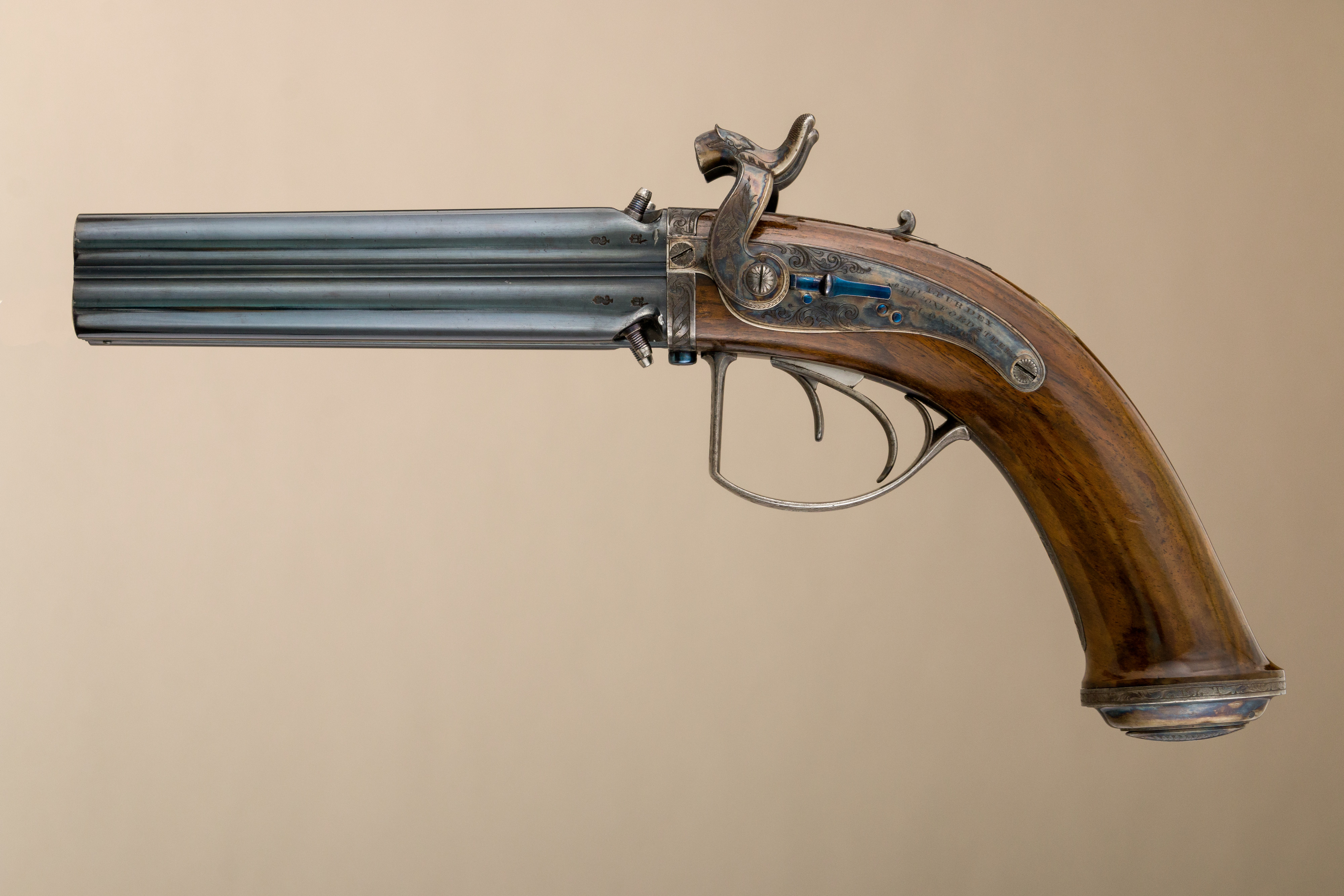
Four-barreled pistol of Henry Pelham-Clinton, 4th Duke of Newcastle made by James Purdey

The first James Purdey was renowned as a maker of not only fine shotguns, but also rifles and pistols as well. He and his son worked together to develop the first 'Express' rifle, introduced in 1851. The name remains in use today for high-velocity dangerous-game cartridges, and the company continues to build double rifles with a reinforced side-by-side action. Since 1931, Purdey has also offered bolt-action rifles using Mauser actions. In 2018, it launched an updated model that uses a titanium chassis to free-float the barrel for greater accuracy.

Due primarily to both King George V and Earl de Grey, Purdey has a long association with building back-action hammer ejector guns, most of which were built between 1895 and 1931. In 2004, the company reintroduced the Hammer Ejector to its range, using a sidelock action styled after its 1870s bar-in-wood guns.

During the inter-war period, Purdey responded to demands from its American clients by introducing a single-barrelled trap gun (1923) and an over-and-under model (1925). The latter was based on a design by Edwinson Green, and despite significant refinement in the early 1930s, only 27 were ever completed. In 1949, Purdey purchased another gunmaker, James Woodward & Sons, primarily for its 'Under & Over' design, which they had patented in 1913. A slightly-modified design remains in production today, alongside their 'Sporter' and 'Trigger-Plate' models, introduced in 2007 and 2018, respectively.

All of these models are built in the company's Hammersmith factory, which has been there since the late 1970s. The factory was fully rebuilt in 2014 to mark the company's bicentenary, and was opened by the Duke of Edinburgh in 2015.

== Clothing and accessories ==
While Purdey had always supplied shooting accessories, it did not offer a full range of clothing and accessories until 1974, when it was started by Richard Beaumont's wife, Lavinia. This was originally run from 84 Mount Street, which had its own door, and it focussed on high-quality shooting clothing, gifts, and accessories. The range has since expanded to include luxury lifestyle pieces and luggage. In June 2024, Giles Deacon succeeded Simon Holloway as Purdey's creative director.

== Purdey Shooting Schools ==
Purdey has owned several shooting schools, including:

- Norlands Shooting Ground in Notting Hill (1840s)
- ‘Foxholes’ in Harrow (1850s)
- ‘Eastcote’ in South Harrow (1928-1934)

After the sale of the Eastcote ground, the company came to an arrangement to lease space at the West London Shooting Ground. Purdey had its own instructor, William Morgan, until his retirement in 1952; thereafter, they relied on the Shooting Ground's instructors. This arrangement continued until 2018, when Purdey purchased The Royal County of Berkshire Shooting Group. This was rebranded as Purdey at the Royal Berkshire in April 2022.
