= Pinellas County Center for the Arts =

Coordinates: 27.7613°N 82.6783°W

The Pinellas County Center for the Arts (PCCA) is a center in the visual and performing arts in the U.S. state of Florida. PCCA is located in Jonathan C Gibbs High School, and populates buildings 4, 5, and 8.

== History ==
In 1979, John Blank, an administrator in the Pinellas County Schools, felt a need for an emphasis in the arts within the school system. A preliminary survey of the County's students, facilities, and communities was taken and Mr. Stan Lee Boss was sent to Dallas, Texas for an on-site visit of their visual and performing arts schools.

With the approval of the school board, a full-time director was provided to work with three Gibbs High School arts instructors, three supervisors and an administrator to prepare a model project for the artistically talented students for the State of Florida. After some thirty on-site visits to well-established secondary schools and programs, a model was written for the State of Florida, published and distributed to all sixty-seven county school superintendents and known arts supervisors.

Dr. Scott Rose, with the approval of the School Board, chose as one of his five-year objectives the development and implementation of both the Artistically Talented Program (now known as PCCA) at Gibbs High School and a Program for the Academically Talented (now known as the International Baccalaureate Program at St. Petersburg High School).

This school of the arts officially began in late August 1984. There were approximately 200 9th and 10th graders starting school; it was hoped that eventually the student population would reach 400. As of today, the number of students attending PCCA is about 500, fairly equally divided among the four major disciplines, Dance, Theatre, Music, and Visual Art.

== Prominent alumni ==
Visual art
- John Allen

* Bede Clark
 * Myron Hansen

Theater

- Juli Crockett- Playwright and director, former professional boxer
- Sierra Kay- Lead singer of Versa
- Michael Lynche- Fourth place on American Idol (season 9)
- Katie Rees- Former Miss Nevada
- Scott Sanders- TV, film and stage producer

Dance

- Rebecca Minkoff- fashion designer
- Calvin Royal III- ballet dancer
- Ephraim Sykes- Actor, dancer, musician, and Tony Award nominee
- Daniel Ulbricht- Dancer with New York City Ballet

Music

- Daniel Thrasher - YouTuber
