= The Runaway (ballet) =

Ballet choreographed by Kyle Abraham

- Choreographer: Kyle Abraham
- Music: Nico Muhly; James Blake; Jay-Z; Kanye West
- Premiere: September 27, 2018; David H. Koch Theater
- Original ballet company: New York City Ballet
- Design: Giles Deacon
- Genre: contemporary ballet

The Runaway is a one-act contemporary ballet choreographed by Kyle Abraham, to music by Nico Muhly, James Blake, Jay-Z and Kanye West, and costumes designed by Giles Deacon. The ballet premiered on September 27, 2018, at the David H. Koch Theater, performed by the New York City Ballet. It is Abraham's first piece for a ballet company, and made him the first black choreographer to work with the company in over a decade.

== Production ==
=== Background ===
The Runaway was one of the first commissions by the New York City Ballet's new interim leadership team, which was formed after ballet master-in-chief Peter Martins left the company due to sexual assault allegations against him. One of the team's members, Justin Peck contacted choreographer Kyle Abraham to make a piece for the company. Jonathan Stafford, another interim leader, said the success of Peck's The Times Are Racing led the team to look for some unorthodox choices in programming.

The commission was a "shock" for Abraham, because he was already accomplished in contemporary dance, and as he recalled, "I was in the lowest of the lowest ballet classes you could be in." Though it was Abraham's first piece for a ballet company, he had previously worked with former New York City Ballet principal dancer Wendy Whelan on her Restless Creature project. With this ballet, Abraham became the first black choreographer to work with the company since Albert Evans in 2005. Shortly after the commission was announced, Abraham said in an interview, "I have a fear that if this piece is seen as a failure, they will never hire another black choreographer again."

=== Development ===
Abraham, who only saw the company perform a handful of times, worked with interim leader Rebecca Krohn on casting and sought out dancers who would be "open to someone who isn’t necessarily going to walk in the room with steps ready for them." He asked for black women in the cast, but it was not possible as other choreographers had made the same request.

Normally, he would make a piece over the course of a year, but this time he was given three weeks. He said he believed some would expect him to "make a hip-hop dance" due to his race, and noted it was "tricky" for him as he would "love the opportunity to make a classic ballet" but also wanted to make a piece that "infuses a whole other energy and vibe in the space," and not a "canned version of ballet with an urban zhoozh." In the final product, hip-hop was one of the influences of the ballet. Abraham had never choreographed on pointe shoes before but decided to use them for this ballet.

Abraham considered using classical music, but opted for Nico Muhly, James Blake, Jay-Z and Kanye West. Muhly is a contemporary classical composer, a contrast to other songs. The costumes were designed by Giles Deacon.

=== Premiere ===
The Runaway had its premiere on September 27, 2018, at the New York City Ballet fall fashion gala, with dancers Ashley Bouder, Jonathan Fahoury, Sara Mearns, Roman Mejia, Georgina Pazcoguin, Taylor Stanley, Sebastian Villarini-Velez and Peter Walker. Two days later, Kanye West made a pro-Donald Trump speech on Saturday Night Live, and Abraham addressed the issue on social media.

== Music ==
The Runaway is set to music by Nico Muhly, James Blake, Jay-Z and Kanye West, including:

- Quiet Music from Three Etudes
- Part I: Material in Eb and Part II: Material in Sevenths from Drones & Violin
- Part III: The 8th Tune from Drones & Piano
- "Don't Miss It"
- "Gotta Have It"
- "I Am a God"
- "I Love Kanye"
- "I Thought About Killing You"
- "Next Lifetime"
- "Ni**as in Paris"
- "POWER"

== Critical reception ==
Apollinaire Scherr of the Financial Times gave it five stars, called it "a paragon of outsider infiltration, stretching and revealing the givens of ballet, including how it peoples the stage," and noted "it was fitting that the first post-Martins commission went to Kyle Abraham." The New York Times's Alastair Macaulay commented that the ballet is "patchy, hybrid, flawed and often sensational". He praised the choreography of solos with Stanley, but criticized the female parts for looking "like mere fashion accessories." Siobhan Burke added The Runaway in the New York Times's "Best Dance of 2018," while Macaulay mentioned it when he included the fall fashion gala on the list. Stanley's performance was singled out by the critics. Dance Magazine's Jennifer Stahl wrote that Stanley was the first dancer she saw to "bleed neoclassical technique into a mix of street and contemporary styles so masterfully." He won a Bessie Award for his performance.
