= Calvin Royal III =

American ballet dancer

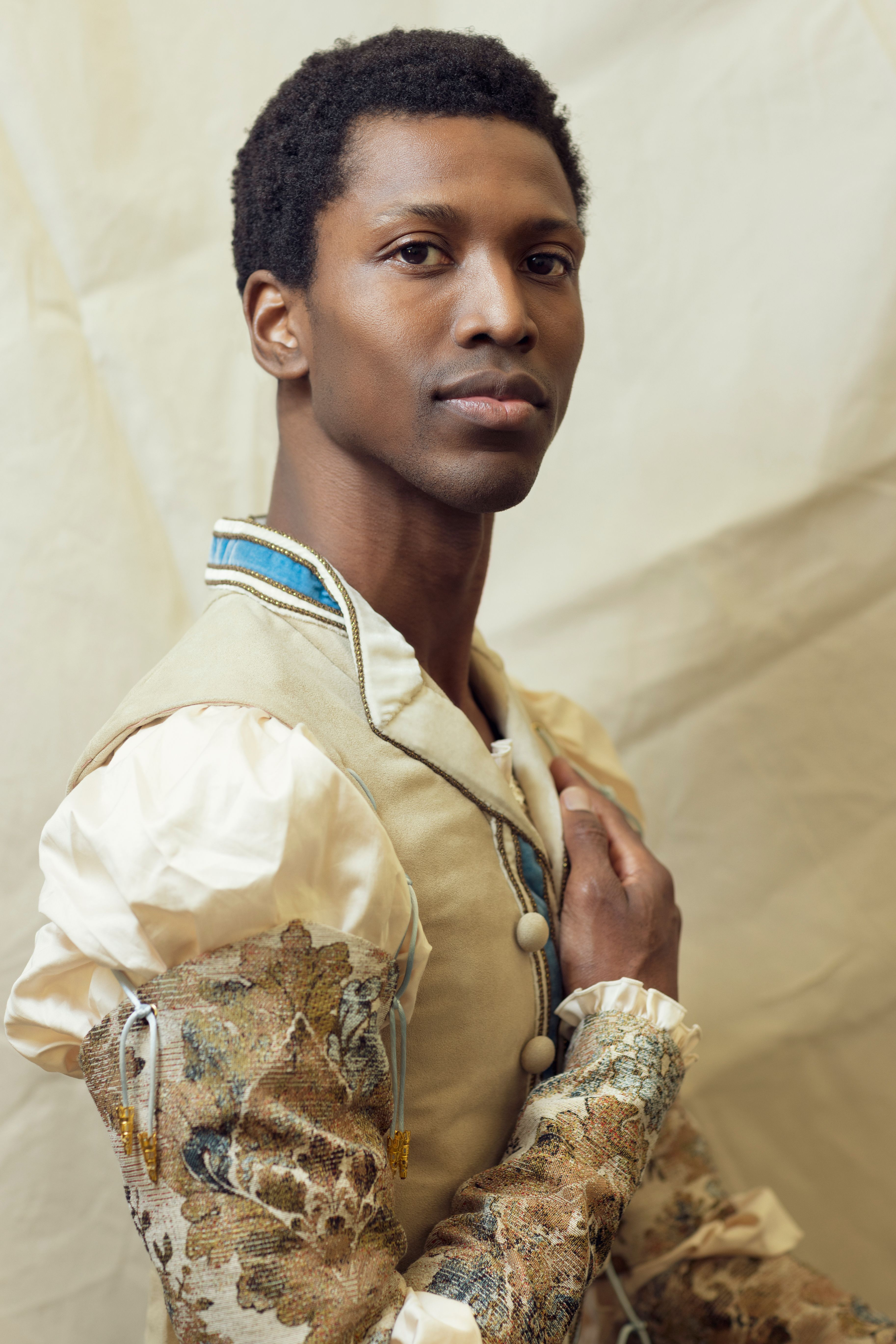
- Born: 1988 or 1989 (age 36–37)
- Education: Pinellas County Center for the Arts; Jacqueline Kennedy Onassis School
- Occupation: ballet dancer
- Years active: 2007-present
- Spouse: Jacek Mysinski
- Career
- Current group: American Ballet Theatre
- Website: www.calvinroyaliii.com

Calvin Royal III (born 1988 or 1989) is an American ballet dancer. He is the third black dancer to be a principal dancer with the American Ballet Theatre.

== Early life and training ==
Royal is from Tampa, Florida. He first studied in piano, and had appeared in a local dance show titled The Chocolate Nutcracker. At age 14, he was recommended to audition for Pinellas County Center for the Arts at Gibbs High School's dance program and was accepted despite his lack of dance training. When he was 17, he competed at the Youth America Grand Prix "just hoping to get feedback", and received a scholarship to the Jacqueline Kennedy Onassis School in New York City.

== Career ==
Royal joined ABT II, American Ballet Theatre's second company in 2007, became an apprentice with the main company in 2010, a corps de ballet member in 2011, and soloist in 2017. In 2014, Royal received a $50,000 fellowship which he used to tour Europe and to train at the Royal Ballet in London and the Mariinsky Theatre in St. Petersburg, Russia.

In 2019, Royal and Misty Copeland became the first black duo in ABT to dance the lead roles in a ballet, by performing Ratmansky's restaging of Harlequinade. Later that year, on his debut as the title role in Balanchine's Apollo, the New York Times wrote that he "is suddenly the most elegant male dancer in the company". In 2020, though his debuts as the lead roles in Giselle and MacMillan's Romeo and Juliet were delayed due to the coronavirus pandemic, he was promoted to principal dancer, making him the third black person to reach this rank, after Desmond Richardson and Copeland.

In 2017, Royal performed a pas de deux Balanchine's Agon alongside New York City Ballet soloist Unity Phelan, with Arthur Mitchell, who originated Royal's role and the first African American dancer with NYCB, in the audience. Mitchell commented the ballet was "in good hands", and later said "If they ever did a film of a young me, it would be Calvin." The following year, after Mitchell's death, Royal and Phelan reprised the Agon pas de deux at his memorial.

Royal had been a frequent performer at the Vail Dance Festival since 2015. He was named artist-in-residence of the festival in 2020. Royal was also handpicked by Copeland to be her partner in performances outside of the company.

== Personal life ==
Royal is openly gay, and is married to Polish pianist Jacek Mysinski.

Royal studied at the Long Island University when he was in ABT II and an ABT apprentice, but withdrew when he joined the corps de ballet due to his schedule. He resumed his study through Saint Mary's College of California's LEAP program in 2018 after he became a soloist.
