= Peter Walker (dancer) =

American ballet dancer and choreographer

- Born: 1992 or 1993 (age 33–34)
- Education: School of American Ballet
- Occupations: ballet dancer; choreographer
- Years active: 2012–present
- Career
- Current group: New York City Ballet

Peter Walker (born 1992 or 1993) is an American ballet dancer and choreographer. He joined the New York City Ballet (NYCB) in 2012 and was promoted to principal dancer in 2022. He choreographed Ten in Seven (2016) and Dance Odyssey (2018) for NYCB, as well as the 2020 film I'm Thinking of Ending Things.

== Early life and training ==
Walker was raised in Fort Myers, Florida. He began learning tap dancing at age eight, before focusing on ballet after being convinced by his ballet teacher and former New York City Ballet principal dancer Melinda Roy. He took part in School of American Ballet's summer program in 2006 and 2007, before entering the scholl full-time in 2007. Whilst a student, he appeared in a ballet choreographed by Lauren Lovette. In his last year at the school, he choreographed a pas de deux for the student workshop. One of the dancers slated to perform got injured, so Walker danced his part.

== Career ==
Walker became an apprentice with the New York City Ballet in spring 2011, and was invited to make a ballet for the New York Choreographic Institute in the summer. The next year, while he was injured, he was invited to choreograph for the institute again. He joined the company in fall 2012. He was cast in several featured roles when he was still in the corps de ballet, including in Balanchine's A Midsummer Night's Dream and Agon, Bigonzetti's Oltremare, for which he was cast at the last minute, and as Romeo in Martins' Romeo + Juliet.

In 2015, Walker choreographed for the School of American Ballet's Winter Ball. He used a commission score by Thomas Kikta, a classical guitarist. In 2016, he choreographed his first ballet for the NYCB Fashion Gala, entitled Ten in Seven, with Kikta again writing the score, and costumes designed by Jason Wu. In 2018, Walker choreographed his second ballet for the NYCB, Dance Odyssey, to music from Oliver Davis's albums Fight and Dance. In summer of that year, he choreographed in Munich for Bavarian State Opera's Young Choreographer program.

In October 2018, Walker was promoted to soloist at the NYCB, as one of the first dancers promoted by the company's interim leadership, after Peter Martins' abrupt retirement. As a soloist, he performed in Balanchine's Slaughter on Tenth Avenue, Orpheus and Kammermusik No. 2, in Robbins' Dances at a Gathering, in N.Y. Export: Opus Jazz, Peck's Rodeo: Four Dance Episodes, and Martins' Swan Lake, in which he portrayed Prince Siegfried. He originated roles in Abraham's The Runaway (2018), Liang's Lineage (2019) and Roberts' Emanon — in Two Movements (2022).

Walker choreographed a dream ballet sequence for Charlie Kaufman's 2020 film I'm Thinking of Ending Things. The number was inspired by the musical Oklahoma! and performed by Unity Phelan and Ryan Steele.

In 2022, Walker was promoted to principal dancer, following several veteran dancers' retirements.
