= Aspinal of London =

British fashion design company

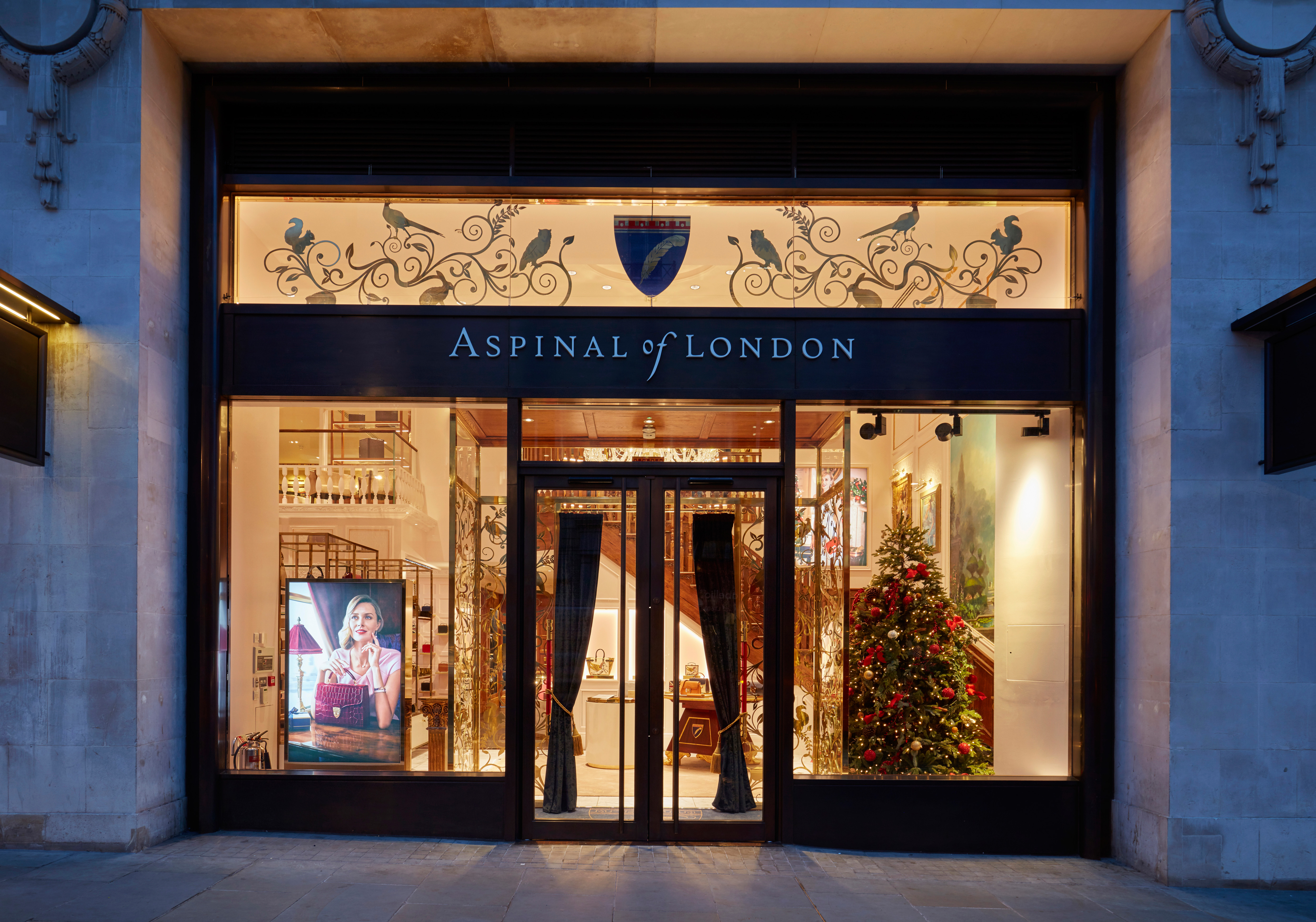
- Aspinal store in London.
- Type: Private company
- Industry: Fashion design
- Founded: 2001
- Founder: Iain Burton
- Headquarters: Fernhurst, West Sussex
- Key people: Mariya Dykalo (Head designer) | Laura Brown (CEO)
- Products: Leather goods
- Number of employees: 300 (2020)
- Website: Aspinal of London

Aspinal of London is a British designer, manufacturer and retailer of luxury leather goods and accessories, founded in London in 2001 by Iain Burton. It was a supplier of leather accessories to the gift shops of museums such as the National Gallery, the Louvre and the Vatican until launching their first store in Selfridges in 2007.

== History ==
Former record executive Iain Burton founded the brand in 2001.

In 2007, the brand launched its first handbag titled The Paris Bag. Aspinal also opened its first retail location in Selfridges London.

In 2010, the brand opened the brand's first flagship store on Brook Street, Mayfair London. In 2012,

In 2013, Aspinal of London opened a concession in Harrods department store, in Knightsbridge London.

In August 2020, the Aspinal's concession moved to a larger 1300 square foot double boutique within the newly developed Arcade, created to be the destination for British luxury gifting within Harrods.

In 2016, Aspinal collaborated with Chinese actress and singer Yang Mi, launching a limited-edition collection of Trunk Clutch bags titled the ‘Yang Mi Bag’. The collaboration was in support of the One Foundation, a charity founded by Jet Li to promote the development of China's public welfare. For every Yang Mi bag sold, 900 RMB was donated to the One Foundation.

In 2017, founder Burton sold 20% of the company to the family office Four Seasons.

In 2018, after a successful capsule collaboration, Aspinal appointed Giles Deacon as design director to work alongside Mariya Dykalo. 2018 saw further international brand growth into the U.S. market, launching Aspinal's first wholesale partnership with Barneys New York. Further overseas growth followed within Europe with the launch of a successful 3-month pop-up store in Galeries Lafayette, Paris.

During Covid period Aspinal closed permanently ten stand alone stores mainly in London and UK as part of a Company Voluntary Agreement. In November 2019, Aspinal of London opened its first store in Shanghai within L+; a mall in the Pudong financial district turned fashion hub. The Shanghai store is inspired by the UK flagship in London's Regent Street St James's, encapsulating Aspinal's English heritage brand signatures.

== Description ==
Aspinal head office is based in Fernhurst, Midhurst, West Sussex on the edge of the South Downs National Park. Aspinal has supports the South Downs National Park Trust, The Olena Pinchuk charity in Ukraine for injured war veterans and maintains about twenty Bee hives producing more than 1000 jars of organic honey per year. Aspinal is the sponsor of the Midhurst Town Cup polo competition.

== Collaborations ==
=== Princess Catherine ===
The Duchess of Cambridge first carried the Aspinal of London Midi Mayfair bag in 2013, and has since carried the bag on several occasions in both Black and Lilac colourways. Prior to her wedding, a Kate Middleton "Princess Catherine Engagement Doll" was sold, which came with a toy Aspinal bag as an accessory. The Duchess of Cambridge has carried the Beulah x Aspinal of London Clutch on several occasions.

=== Others ===
- 2010: Elizabeth Hurley bag in support of the Breast Cancer Research Foundation.
- 2015: Beulah x Aspinal clutch, with 25% of the profit donated to the UN Blue Heart Campaign.
- 2016: Dockery bag.
- 2018: Aerodrome collection with David Gandy consisting of men's leather backpacks, business bags and travel accessories.
- 2018: Giles x Aspinal collection of handbags.
