= Gibbs High School (St. Petersburg, Florida) =

Location
- 850 34th Street South; St. Petersburg, FL 33711-2208; United States; 27°45′41″N 82°40′42″W

Information
- Type: Coed Public High School
- Established: 1927
- School district: Pinellas County Schools
- Superintendent: Kevin Hendrick
- Principal: Barry Brown
- Teaching staff: 71.00 (FTE)
- Grades: 9–12
- Enrollment: 1,160 (2022–23)
- Student to teacher ratio: 16.34
- Colors: Blue and Gold
- Mascot: Gladiator
- Accreditation: Florida State Department of Education
- Newspaper: The Gibbsonian
- PCCA Colors: Black and White
- BETA Colors: Black and Red
- Website: Gibbs HS website

Gibbs High School is a public high school of the Pinellas County School District in St. Petersburg, Florida. Gibbs is home to the Pinellas County Center for the Arts (PCCA), Business, Economics, and Technology Academy (BETA) and their television production in Communication Arts. The school is named for Jonathan Clarkson Gibbs, a black man who was Superintendent of Public Instruction and Secretary of State in Florida during the Reconstruction era. Gibbs' current principal is Barry Brown.

== History ==
With a slowing economy in 1926 and fewer whites moving into Pinellas County, the school board converted an unopened white elementary school in St. Petersburg into Gibbs Junior-Senior High School for black students only. It opened without electrical lighting or adequate equipment

Before Gibbs opened in 1927, Pinellas County had no school for blacks past 6th grade. Families wishing for high school education had to enroll in private, mostly church-run black schools. Gibbs became the county's first public secondary school for blacks, occupying an eight-classroom building that cost $49,490 to build. Proms were held at the Manhattan Casino.

In 1954, two black co-valedictorians of Gibbs were refused admission to St. Petersburg Junior College, which was operated by the school district. Though the US Supreme Court struck down "Separate but equal" schooling in the Brown v. Board of Education case in 1954, the first white student did not enroll at Gibbs (in a vocational program) until 1961. Decades of parent protests and court cases followed the initial roll-out of desegregation plans in the county.

In 1966, Gibbs won the black state high school basketball championship. For the 1966–1967 school year, Gibbs became the first black school to join the FHSAA and compete against white schools. In their first year (1967), Gibbs won the basketball state championship.

To assist their integration goals, the district approved the creation of a magnet program at Gibbs in 1984-85, then called the Artistically Talented Program. Now known as the Pinellas County Center for the Arts, it includes instruction for about 500 students in dance, music, theater and visual art. In 2004, Gibbs High School was included in the federal grant received by Pinellas County Schools for the establishment of small learning communities (SLCs). Today, the high school is host to smaller learning communities that have curriculum pathways in Communication Arts, Travel & Tourism, Global Studies and a freshman Renaissance program.

In 1991, Barbara Shorter, an alumnus of the school, became its principal. She was the first black principal in Pinellas County.

A new campus opened to students in the 2005–2006 school year. The same year, the school was reported to be experiencing increased student defiance fueled by the racial divide in the student population.

Democratic Presidential Nominee and Illinois Senator Barack Obama visited the school for a town-hall style speech on August 1, 2008.

Gibbs became the first high school in Pinellas county to receive an "F" letter grade as of the 2009–2010 school year because of poor FCAT results. Less than one third of 9th and 10th graders were reading at grade level.

In 2024, Gibbs won the basketball state championship for the first time since 1969 with a win of 49-43 over Jacksonville's Andrew Jackson High School.

== Notable alumni ==
- Dave Anderson - Former professional baseball player (Los Angeles Dodgers, San Francisco Giants) and current Texas Rangers first base coach
- Boof Bonser - Current professional baseball player (Minnesota Twins, Boston Red Sox, Oakland Athletics)
- Trayvon Bromell – Track and field athlete
- Ed Charles - Former professional baseball player (Kansas City Athletics, New York Mets)
- Glen Edwards - Professional football
- Justin Hires - Comedian, actor, writer
- Shaun King - Professional football
- Sierra Kusterbeck - Female vocalist for the alternative band VersaEmerge
- Jeff Lacy - Professional boxer
- James Howard Meredith - first African American to enroll at the University of Mississippi; civil rights leader
- Nate Oliver - Former professional baseball player (Los Angeles Dodgers, San Francisco Giants, New York Yankees, Chicago Cubs)
- Scott Sanders - TV, film and stage producer
- Martin Sherman - Actor
- Marreese Speights - Professional basketball
- Ephraim Sykes - Actor, dancer, musician
- Daniel Ulbricht - Dancer with New York City Ballet
- Ronald "Winky" Wright - Professional boxer

== See also ==
- Gibbs Junior College
