= Kyle Abraham =

American choreographer

- Kyle Abraham. Photo by Tatiana Wills.
- Born: August 14, 1977 (age 49); Pittsburgh, Pennsylvania
- Occupation: Choreographer
- Awards: Guggenheim Fellowship (2026)

Kyle Abraham (born August 14, 1977) is an American choreographer and dancer. He founded his own company Kyle Abraham Dance Vanguard (formerly A.I.M by Kyle Abraham/Abraham.In.Motion) in 2006 in New York City and has produced many original works for the company such as The Radio Show (2010), Absent Matter (2015), Pavement (2012), Dearest Home (2017), Drive (2017), INDY (2018), Studies on Farewell (2019), and An Untitled Love (2021). Kyle has also been commissioned to create new works for international dance companies such as Untitled America (2016) for the Alvin Ailey American Dance Theater, The Runaway (2018) for New York City Ballet, The Bystander (2019) for Hubbard Street Dance Chicago, Only The Lonely (2019) for Paul Taylor American Modern Dance and Ash (2019).

== Early life and career ==
Kyle Abraham was born in Lincoln-Larimer Pittsburgh, Pennsylvania in 1977. He began dancing when he was young at the Civic Light Opera Academy and the Pittsburgh Creative and Performing Arts School in Pittsburgh, Pennsylvania. He continued his dance studies in New York, receiving a BFA from SUNY Purchase and an MFA from the NYU Tisch School of the Arts, and an honorary Doctorate in Fine Arts from Washington Jefferson College. After graduating with his MFA, Abraham was approached by David Dorfman to dance in his company. He went on to perform with the following dance companies: Bill T. Jones/Arnie Zane Dance Company, The Kevin Wynn Collective, Nathan Trice/Rituals, Dance Alloy and Attack Theatre.

== A.I.M by Kyle Abraham ==
Abraham established his company A.I.M by Kyle Abraham (formerly Abraham.In.Motion) in 2006 with the mission to create a body of dance-based work that is galvanized by Black culture and history. Abraham creates work for his company that draws from his personal experiences, often exploring themes of Black life, emotion, and the relationship between visual art, music and dance.

A.I.M by Kyle Abraham has been presented around the United States and abroad. US venues include Fall for Dance Festival at New York City Center, Lincoln Center, Brooklyn Academy of Music, The Joyce Theater, The Los Angeles Music Center, Jacob's Pillow Dance Festival, Harlem Stage, On The Boards, Danspace Project, Dance Theater Workshop, Bates Dance Festival, and more, as well as The Andy Warhol Museum, The Byham and The Kelly-Strayhorn Theater in Abraham's hometown of Pittsburgh, PA. International venues include Théâtre de la Ville, Sadler's Wells, Maison de la Danse, Tanz Im August, Dublin's Project Arts Center, The Okinawa Prefectural Museum & Art Museum located in Okinawa Japan, and more.

== Choreographic works and career milestones ==
=== Works for A.I.M by Kyle Abraham ===
The first choreographic work Abraham created for A.I.M in 2006 was Fading into Something Tangible, premiering in Pittsburgh. In 2010 Abraham created The Radio Show, where he "delves into identity and personal history....Creating an abstract narrative around the loss of communication, he investigates the effects of the abrupt discontinuation of a radio station on a community and the lingering effects of Alzheimer's and aphasia on a family. Abraham mixes recordings of classic soul and hip-hop with contemporary classical compositions to create an eclectic score that evokes fond memories and a passion for what is lost."

Some of Abraham's other choreographic works include A Ramp to Paradise, Op. 1, Live! The Realest MC, and Pavement. A Ramp to Paradise, was commissioned by THPAC and is about a true story by Alex Smith that describes the history of the black gay underground club called Paradise Garage, which was the "it" place in the New York City 1970s and '80s dance world. Op. 1 is a performance inspired by photographer Eadweard Muybridge's art. Live! The Realest MC is inspired by Walt Disney's Pinocchio in an industrial environment. It consists of a journey to find "realness" and includes hip hop karaoke. The work was commissioned by The Kitchen, The Kelly Strayhorn Theater (world premiere), Miami Dade, On The Boards, Bates Dance Festival, Dance Place, 651 ARTS and NPN. Pavement, premiered at Harlem Stage in November 2012, is inspired by the 1991 film Boyz n the Hood. It includes a wide variety of music, ranging from Bach to Sam Cooke, to express the themes of violence, love, and pain in Pavement. Seen from the perspective of a group of friends struggling to stay together while their community is tearing apart, critics were struck by this piece, Andrew Boynton of The New Yorker saying: "Pavement is a hard, unforgiving thing, but for some people it's also home."

Abraham was the 2012–14 Resident Commissioned Artist at New York Live Arts, and created two new works for the Live Arts stage. The Watershed premiered at New York Live Arts on September 23, 2014, with scenic design by visual artist Glenn Ligon and a score from a contemporary cello suite to Otis Redding. The second work developed at Live Arts was When the Wolves Came In and it premiered on October 25, 2014, also with scenic design by Glenn Ligon. It featured music from We Insist! by Max Roach as well as an original composition by Robert Glasper.

Drive (2017), choreographed by Abraham in collaboration with A.I.M, was commissioned by New York City Center for the 2017 Fall for Dance Festival. Drive is frequently included in A.I.M by Kyle Abraham's touring of mixed repertory performances. In 2018, Abraham created Show Pony, a solo work set to musician Jlin's song "Hatshepsut" and as was described by Brian Seibert in The New York Times as capturing "the pressures of being on display and having to deliver."

INDY, a 2018 work commissioned by the Joyce Theater, was the first full-length solo choreographed and performed by Abraham in nearly ten years. The dance features original music by Jerome Begin and visual art by Abigail DeVille. Abraham choreographed another solo work entitled Cocoon in 2019. This piece infuses contemporary and modern dance styles with elements of hip-hop and street dance. At the world premiere, a chorus of singers accompanied Abraham's movements.

In 2019, Abraham created Studies On A Farewell in collaboration with his dancers from A.I.M by Kyle Abraham, commissioned by The Joyce Theater Foundation's Artist Residency Center. It is a tender work featuring nine dancers set to a classical score by Nico Muhly, Sebastian Bartmann, and Ludwig van Beethoven.

Abraham served as a visiting professor in residence at UCLA's World Arts Cultures in Dance program from 2016 to 2021. In 2021, he was named the Claude and Alfred Mann Endowed Professorship in Dance at The University of Southern California Glorya Kaufman School of Dance. Abraham currently sits on the advisory board for Dance Magazine and the artist advisory board for Hubbard Street Dance Chicago.

An Untitled Love (2021), is an evening-length work generated by Abraham through residencies at the Pillow Lab at Jacob's Pillow; the August Wilson African American Cultural Center in Pittsburgh, Pennsylvania; and the National Center for Choreography at the University of Akron. The work draws from the catalog of Grammy Award-winning R&B legend D'Angelo and pays homage to the complexities of self love and Black love, while serving as a thumping mixtape celebrating our culture, family and community.

In 2021, Abraham also developed the evening-length work Requiem: Fire in the Air of the Earth, in collaboration with pioneering producer, composer, and EDM artist Jlin. This piece explores death, folklore, and reincarnation through a reimagining of Mozart's Requiem in D minor.

=== Commissioned works outside of A.I.M by Kyle Abraham ===
In addition to creating work for his company, Abraham has also been commissioned to create new works for prominent dance companies including Alvin Ailey American Dance Theater, New York City Ballet and The Royal Ballet. Another Night, commissioned for Alvin Ailey American Dance Theater, premiered at New York's City Center in December 2012. Of this piece, Rebecca Bengal of Vogue writes: "What Abraham brings to Ailey is an avant-garde aesthetic, an original and politically minded downtown sensibility that doesn't distinguish between genres but freely draws on a vocabulary that is as much Merce and Martha as it is Eadweard Muybridge and Michael Jackson." Abraham served as a choreographic contributor for Beyoncé's 2013 British Vogue cover shoot. Abraham collaborated with New York City Ballet principal dancer Wendy Whelan to create a duet entitled The Serpent and the Smoke that premiered at Jacob's Pillow Dance Festival in 2013 and toured in 2016. Untitled America, also commissioned for Alvin Ailey American Dance Theater, is a 3-part work that premiered in 2016.

Abraham has choreographed for film as well, including the 2017 feature-length film The Book of Henry directed by Colin Trevorrow. Abraham premiered the Bessie-nominated The Runaway for New York City Ballet at the 2018 Fall Fashion Gala, which was recognized as one of the "Best Dance of 2018" by The New York Times.

In fall 2019, he choreographed Ash, a solo work for American Ballet Theatre Principal Dancer Misty Copeland; Only The Lonely, the last commissioned choreographic work selected by Paul Taylor himself before his passing for Paul Taylor Dance Company; and The Bystander, a new commission for Hubbard Street Dance Chicago to rave reviews. In 2020 Misty and Kyle reunited for an intimate conversation as part of A.I.M's 2020 Virtual Homecoming Gala Sponsored by The Skin Deep program {The And}.

Abraham premiered to be seen, a new solo for American Ballet Theatre Principal Dancer Calvin Royal III, for the 2020 virtual Fall For Dance Festival. Abraham collaborated with New York City Ballet Principal Dancer Taylor Stanley on Ces noms que nous portons (2020), a Lincoln Center and NYCB commissioned solo; choreographed the music video for Sufjan Stevens' Sugar (2020); and choreographed Unto The End We Meet (2021), commissioned by the National Ballet of Cuba. Abraham premiered When We Fell in 2021, his third creation for New York City Ballet.

Abraham received two commissions from The Royal Ballet in London, UK for 2021 and 2022. Optional Family, a divertissement premiered in May 2021 as part of their 21st Century Choreographers program. The Weathering, a full one-act length ballet, premiered in March 2022.

Abraham returned to New York City Ballet in 2022, premiering Love Letter (on shuffle), a new work set to the music of James Blake at the company's Fall Fashion Gala. The piece was repeatedly performed as part of the New York City Ballet's repertoire throughout 2023 and 2024. For American Ballet Theatre's Fall 2024 season, Abraham premiered a new work entitled Mercurial Son, set to the music of German electronic musician and visual artist Grischa Lichtenberger.

== Selected works ==
- 2006 Inventing Pookie Jenkins – Kyle Abraham
- 2006 Fading Into Something Tangible – A.I.M by Kyle Abraham
- 2007 Another Building Dancing # Quarantine (Film - Short) – Danz Isa
- 2010 The Radio Show – A.I.M by Kyle Abraham
- 2010 Op. 1 – A.I.M by Kyle Abraham
- 2010 The Corner – Ailey II
- 2011 Live! The Realest MC – A.I.M by Kyle Abraham
- 2011 The Quiet Dance – A.I.M by Kyle Abraham
- 2011 Addition Incorporated (Film – Documentary) – Acapella Pictures, Dune Road Films
- 2012 Pavement – A.I.M by Kyle Abraham
- 2012 Another Night – Alvin Ailey American Dance Theater
- 2012 A Ramp to Paradise – A.I.M by Kyle Abraham
- 2012 Continuous Relation – Second Avenue Dance Company
- 2012 Outsider – Kyle Abraham, Liv O'Donoghue, Ryan O'Neill, Philip Connaughton, and Rebecca Reilly
- 2013 The Serpent and the Smoke – Kyle Abraham and Wendy Whelan
- 2013 Hallowed – A.I.M by Kyle Abraham
- 2013 Kollide – BODYTRAFFIC
- 2013 Blood on the Leaves, Voyeur, Our Love Comes Back, I Am Sold, Retrograde, Digital Lion, Overgrown (New Media) – Collaboration with Carrie Schneider
- 2013 When We Take Flight – A.I.M by Kyle Abraham
- 2014 The Watershed – A.I.M by Kyle Abraham
- 2014 When the Wolves Came In – A.I.M by Kyle Abraham
- 2014 The Gettin' – A.I.M by Kyle Abraham
- 2014 Lamentation Variation – Martha Graham Dance Company
- 2014 Frail – Kyle Abraham
- 2014 Counterpoint – Hubbard Street Dance Chicago
- 2015 Absent Matter – A.I.M by Kyle Abraham
- 2015 Non sequitur paramour – A.I.M by Kyle Abraham
- 2015 The Book of Henry (Feature Film) – Naomi Watts, Lee Pace, and Jacob Tremblay
- 2015 Elevada (Play) – Yale Repertory Theatre
- 2016 Untitled America – Ailey American Dance Theater
- 2016 Restless Creature (Film-Documentary) – Wendy Whelan
- 2016 Candle – TU Dance
- 2016 Wire – Karli Scott, Purchase College
- 2016 Grey – Marcella Lewis, Purchase College
- 2017 Drive – A.I.M by Kyle Abraham
- 2017 Dearest Home – A.I.M by Kyle Abraham
- 2018 Show Pony – A.I.M by Kyle Abraham
- 2018 Meditation: A Silent Prayer – A.I.M by Kyle Abraham
- 2018 The Runaway – New York City Ballet
- 2018 INDY – Kyle Abraham
- 2018 Chapter Song – L.A. Dance Project
- 2019 Ash – American Ballet Theatre Principal Dancer Misty Copeland
- 2019 Big Rings – A.I.M by Kyle Abraham
- 2019 Cocoon – Kyle Abraham
- 2019 Only The Lonely – Paul Taylor American Modern Dance
- 2019 Studies on Farewell – A.I.M by Kyle Abraham
- 2019 The Bystander – Hubbard Street Dance Chicago
- 2020 Ces noms que nous portons – Kyle Abraham and Taylor Stanley for New York City Ballet and Lincoln Center
- 2020 to be seen – American Ballet Theatre Principal Dancer Calvin Royal II
- 2020 And let the air no more – Opera Ballet Vlaanderen
- 2020 Sugar (Music Video) – Sufjan Stevans
- 2021 When We Fell – New York City Ballet
- 2021 Unto The End We Meet – National Ballet of Cuba
- 2021: If We Were a Love Song (film) – A.I.M by Kyle Abraham
- 2021 Our Indigo: If We Were a Love Song – A.I.M by Kyle Abraham
- 2021 An Untitled Love – A.I.M by Kyle Abraham
- 2021 Optional Family, a divertissement – Royal Ballet
- 2021 Requiem: Fire in the Air of the Earth – A.I.M by Kyle Abraham
- 2021 MotorRover
- 2022 Untitled One-Act – Royal Ballet
- 2022 "Are You in Your Feelings?" - Alvin Ailey American Dance Theater

== Critical acclaim ==
In 2009, Abraham was listed in Dance Magazine′s "25 to Watch" where he was described as, "equal parts power and grace." In 2010, he was awarded a Bessie Award for his piece The Radio Show, and won a Princess Grace Award for Choreography. In 2011, OUT Magazine labeled Abraham as the "best and brightest creative talent to emerge in New York City in the age of Obama."

In 2012, Abraham was named the Jacob's Pillow Dance Award recipient, and a USA Ford Fellow. He became the New York Live Arts Resident Commissioned Artist for 2012–2014. In 2013, the choreographer was awarded a prestigious MacArthur Fellowship. In 2014, he received an Honorary Doctorate in Fine Arts from Washington & Jefferson College. In 2015, Abraham was named Choreographer in Residence by New York City Center. In 2015, he was the recipient of another Princess Grace Foundation accolade, a Special Project Award, and in 2016 he won the Doris Duke Performing Artist Award. In 2017, Abraham's hometown of Pittsburgh declared November 10 Kyle Abraham Day.

In 2018, the choreographer won a Princess Grace Statue Award. Also that year, Abraham's work The Runaway for the New York City Ballet's 2018 Fall Fashion Gala was recognized as a "Best Dance of 2018" by The New York Times. The New York Times applauded Abraham for his virtual work at the 2020 Fall for Dance Festival saying "how skilled he has become at mingling the ballet vernacular with other forms, from hip-hop to West African movement" and his unique talent for "finding the person within the dancer and the bodies within a body." In 2020, he was selected to be Dance Magazine's first-ever Guest Editor. In 2022, Abraham was selected to be an inaugural member of the Black Genius Brain Trust, and was selected by the Kennedy Center to be one of their Next 50 Cultural Leaders, an honor celebrating individuals who are lighting the way forward through art and action.

== Awards and recognition ==
- 2010, New York Dance and Performance "Bessie" Award
- 2010, Princess Grace Foundation Fellowship in Choreography
- 2012, United States Artists Fellow
- 2012, Jacob's Pillow Dance Award
- 2012, Joyce Creative Residency Artist
- 2013, MacArthur Fellowship
- 2013, Creative Capital Award
- 2014, Honorary Doctorate in Fine Arts, Washington & Jefferson College.
- 2015, New York City Center Choreographer in Residence
- 2016, Doris Duke Performing Artist Award
- 2017, Abraham's hometown of Pittsburgh declares November 10 "Kyle Abraham Day"
- 2017–2018, Joyce Creative Residency Artist
- 2018, Princess Grace Statue Award
- 2020, White Bird Barney Commissioning Prize
- 2026, Guggenheim Fellowship
