= Tiler Peck =

American ballet dancer (born 1989)

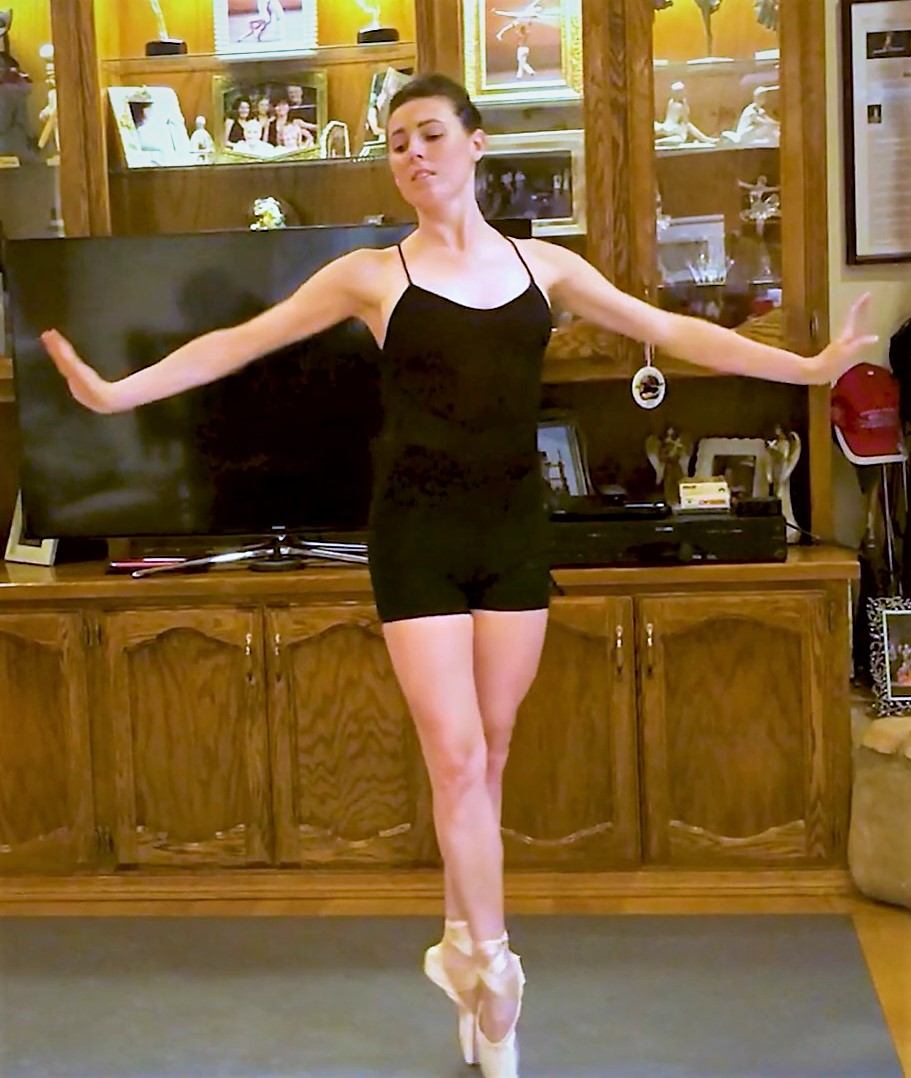
- Peck dancing for Swans for Relief in 2020
- Born: January 12, 1989 (age 37); Bakersfield, California, U.S.
- Education: School of American Ballet
- Occupation: Ballet dancer
- Years active: 2004–present
- Spouses: Robbie Fairchild (m. 2014; div. 2017); Roman Mejia (m. 2025)
- Dancing career
- Current group: New York City Ballet

Tiler Kalyn Peck (born January 12, 1989) is an American ballet dancer who is a principal dancer with the New York City Ballet. As well as ballet, she has performed in musical theatre shows and has made cameo appearances in films including Donnie Darko and television series including Tiny Pretty Things.

== Early life ==
Born in Bakersfield, California, Peck started her studies at her mother's ballet studio in Bakersfield, at the age of two. She started her formal training in classical ballet at the age of seven when she received private lessons in Hollywood from Alla Khaniashvili, a former dancer with the Bolshoi Ballet. Later, she began to study with New York City Ballet dancers Colleen and Patricia Neary in California. During this time she enrolled at the Westside School of Ballet in Santa Monica where she studied with the former New York City Ballet principal Yvonne Mousey and learned the Balanchine technique.

== Ballet career ==
While performing on Broadway in Susan Stroman's revival of the Meredith Willson musical The Music Man, Peck entered the School of American Ballet for the winter term of 2000–2001. The following year she enrolled as a full-time student starting with the summer session of 2002. In September 2004, she joined New York City Ballet as an apprentice. She was promoted to the corps de ballet in February 2005, to soloist in December 2006, and to principal dancer in October 2009.

Peck danced at the Kennedy Honors ceremony twice, in 2012 and 2014, performing in front of President Barack Obama and First Lady Michelle Obama. In 2014, she started "Tiler Peck Designs", her own dance wear collection carried by Body Wrappers. That same year, she performed at the Laguna Dance Festival, with her colleague Joaquín De Luz. In October of the same year, Peck reunited with Susan Stroman in Washington DC to work with her on her new musical, Little Dancer. After performing in a concert staging of the musical at London's Theatre Royal Drury Lane in summer 2025, it was announced in October 2026 that Peck would reprise her role in a full staging at Theatre Royal Haymarket from February 2027.

Peck's repertoire at NYCB includes choreography by George Balanchine, Jerome Robbins, Susan Stroman, Christopher Wheeldon, Peter Martins and Justin Peck. She has performed leading roles in Jewels, The Nutcracker, Raymonda Variations, La Sylphide, Romeo and Juliet, Coppélia, The Sleeping Beauty, and Swan Lake.

== Other appearances ==
Peck has explored other activities besides ballet, such as musical theater and acting. In 2019, she returned to her role in the musical Little Dancer which had been reworked and re-titled to Marie, Dancing Still. She has also performed as Clara in the Radio City Christmas Spectacular.

She has had small parts in movies. Her appearances include A Time for Dancing (2000), Geppetto (2000), Donnie Darko (2001), Catfish (2010), Enemy Within (2014) and the documentary about choreographer Justin Peck's choreographic process, Ballet 422 (2014). She has appeared on TV performing as a guest on Dancing with the Stars. In 2011 she performed as Marzipan in Live from Lincoln Center’s transmission of The Nutcracker. In 2013, she appeared again at Lincoln Center as Louise Bigelow in the PBS telecast of Rodgers & Hammerstein's Carousel.

In 2017, Peck appeared on The Ellen DeGeneres Show as the first ballerina to ever perform on the show.

Peck was the main focus of the 2018 documentary movie Ballet Now, which was shown at the 2018 Seattle International Film Festival.

In 2020, Peck appeared in the Netflix series Tiny Pretty Things as Sienna Milken. She stars as Eva Cullman, a ballerina in a fictional New York City ballet company, in Étoile, a 2025 television series created by Amy Sherman-Palladino and Daniel Palladino.

On December 8, 2025, Peck performed the “Dance of the Sugar Plum Fairy” from George Balanchine's The Nutcracker on The Late Show with Stephen Colbert, accompanied by Andrew Litton, Music Director of the New York City Ballet.

In 2026, Peck performed in the music video for Olivia Rodrigo's "Stupid Song", dancing with ballerinas from the New York City Ballet and American Ballet Theatre, as well as choreographing it.

== Choreography ==
Peck's first ballet for New York City Ballet, Concerto for Two Pianos, set to Poulenc's score of the same name, premiered on February 1, 2024. Her second, Symphonie Espagnole, to Lalo's work for violin and orchestra, premiered on May 7, 2026. She has also choreographed Variations for Three, to music by Paganini. In September 2026 it was announced she had been named the New York City Ballet’s first-ever choreographic associate, making her the first woman to have any choreographic position at the New York City Ballet.

== Personal life ==
Peck married New York City principal ballet dancer Robbie Fairchild, on June 22, 2014, in New York. The couple separated in 2017. For the duration of her marriage, Peck was sister-in-law to Megan Fairchild, Robert's sister. Robbie Fairchild would later come out as gay.

In September 2024, she announced her engagement to ballet dancer Roman Mejia. They married on June 22, 2025.
