= Simon Holloway =

English fashion designer

- Born: 2 December 1971 (age 54); Newcastle Upon Tyne, England
- Occupation: Fashion Designer
- Years active: 1995–present

Simon Holloway (born December 2, 1971) is an English fashion designer.

== Early life ==
Holloway was born in Newcastle. He studied in the fashion department of Newcastle College for two years before moving to London, where he attended Kingston University.

== Career ==
Holloway's fashion career began in Paris in the 1990s, where he interned at Chloé for designer Virginie Viard. He then moved to the United States in 1994, when he started designing menswear for Richard Tyler. In 1999, Holloway moved to New York, where he served as Design Director at Narciso Rodriguez until 2004 and then worked on womenswear collections at Ralph Lauren through 2007. He also designed for Calvin Klein and Michael Kors.

In 2010, he was made Creative Director of British fashion house Jimmy Choo and managed the brand in preparation for its 2011 sale from Towerbrook to Labelux for $900 million. He introduced the brand's first menswear collections, as well as fragrances and eyewear.

Holloway joined the Italian fashion house Agnona, then a Zegna brand, as Creative Director in 2015. As part of his fall 2016 collection, Holloway collaborated with filmmaker Ferdinando Cito Filomarino to make a short film, Await, celebrating the work of Luchino Visconti and starring the model Malgosia Bela. Holloway contributed to improvements in the label's sustainable sourcing practices for natural and synthetic materials. In 2020, Holloway showed Agnona's first menswear collection in twenty years.

As of April 2023, Holloway is the Creative Director at British luxury goods brand Alfred Dunhill, Ltd..
