= Lauren Lovette =

American ballet dancer and choreographer (born 1991)

- Born: Lauren Lovette; November 10, 1991 (age 34); Thousand Oaks, California, United States
- Education: School of American Ballet
- Occupation: Ballet dancer
- Years active: 2009–present
- Career
- Former groups: New York City Ballet.
- Website: www.lauren-lovette.com

Lauren Lovette (born November 10, 1991) is an American ballet dancer and choreographer who was previously a principal dancer with the New York City Ballet.

== Early life and education ==
Lovette was born in Thousand Oaks, California, and started her ballet education at the age of eleven. She went on to study at the Cary Ballet Conservatory in North Carolina, followed by the School of American Ballet.

== Career ==
Lovette became an apprentice with the New York City Ballet in 2009. She was invited to join the company's corps de ballet in 2010 and promoted to soloist in 2013. In 2015, she was promoted to principal dancer.

She has danced an extensive repertoire at New York City Ballet, including existing and new works by George Balanchine, Jerome Robbins, Peter Martins, Justin Peck, Alexei Ratmansky, and Christopher Wheeldon. She also performed for President Barack Obama and First Lady Michelle Obama as part of the 2014 Kennedy Center Honors celebrating Patricia McBride.

Lovette emerged as a choreographer in her own right in 2016 with her work For Clara, commissioned by New York City Ballet. She has gone on to create two more pieces for the company, Not Our Fate (2017) and The Shaded Line (2019), in addition to others for American Ballet Theatre's Studio Company and Damian Woetzel's Vail Dance Festival. She additionally served as the Artist-in-Residence for the Vail Dance Festival in 2019. Her collaborators have included musician Kate Davis, poet Andrea Gibson, and fashion designers Zac Posen, Narciso Rodriguez, and Fernando Garcia and Laura Kim of Oscar de la Renta/MONSE.

In response to her choreography, The New York Times proclaimed in 2019 that, "There's urgency to Ms. Lovette’s desire to turn ballet inside out. In essence, she has crossed a line from prettiness to power."

In October 2021, Lovette left the New York City Ballet, noting it "will give me the time to fully explore new creative projects as both a choreographer and dancer and I'm really excited about the future." Her final performance was held in October, in which she danced Robbins' Opus 19/The Dreamer and Ratmansky's Namouna, A Grand Divertissement. In March 2022, she was appointed resident choreographer of Paul Taylor Dance Company.

== Selected works ==
Lovette's work as a choreographer includes:

- For Clara (2016) - New York City Ballet
- Not Our Fate (2017) - New York City Ballet
- Angels of the Get Through (2017) - Vail Dance Festival
- Le Jeune (2018) - ABT Studio Company
- Red Spotted Purple (2018) - The Ashley Bouder Project
- Papillon (2018) - Vail Dance Festival
- If You're Gonna Build a Body, Start with the Bones (2019) - Vail Dance Festival
- The Shaded Line (2019) - New York City Ballet
- Dreamachine (2023) - Paul Taylor Dance Company
- Pangaea Calling (2023) - The Juilliard School
- Tendu (2024) - School of American Ballet

== Honors ==
- Clive Barnes Award (2012)
- Janice Levin Award (2012–2013)
- Virginia B. Toulmin Fellowship for Women Leaders in Dance at The Center for Ballet and the Arts at New York University (2018)
