= List of San Francisco Ballet 2016 repertory =

San Francisco Ballet dances each year at the War Memorial Opera House, San Francisco, and tours; this is the list of 2016 San Francisco Ballet repertory season with ballets and casts beginning with the opening night gala, Thursday, January 21, 2016. The Nutcracker is danced the year before.

== Gala ==
Thursday, January 21, 2016

The program for the gala

- "Waltz of the Hours" from Coppélia
- World Premiere "Adagio" from the ballet based on Carmen, by Yuri Possokhov
- Bartok Divertimento
- Tchaikovsky Pas de Deux
- Pas de deux from Carousel (A Dance)
- Pas de deux from Don Quixote, Act III

After intermission, SF Ballet Orchestra performed "Infernal Dance" from The Firebird, in Celebration of San Francisco Ballet Orchestra’s 40th Anniversary. (No dancers were on stage during this.)

- San Francisco Ballet Premiere Gentle Memories
- Rubies pas de deux
- Solo, by Hans van Manen
- Pas de deux from Swan Lake, Act III
- North American Premiere Pas de deux from Pas/Parts by William Forsythe
- Theme and Variations finale

== Programs ==
=== Program one, Jan 24 - Feb 5 Mixed program ===
- 7 for 8 by Helgi Tomasson
- Magrittomania by Yuri Possokhov
- Pas/Parts 2016 by William Forsythe

=== Program two, Jan 27 - Feb 6 Mixed program ===
- Rubies
- Drink to Me Only With Thine Eyes by Mark Morris
- Fearful Symmetries (World Premiere) by Liam Scarlett

=== Program three, Feb 19 - Feb 28 Full-Length ===
- Swan Lake

=== Program four, Mar 8 - Mar 13 Full-Length ===
- Coppélia

=== Program five, Mar 16 - Mar 22 Mixed program ===
- Dances at a Gathering
- Swimmer, by Yuri Possokhov

=== Program six, Apr 5 - Apr 16 Mixed program ===
- Prism by Helgi Tomasson
- Seven Sonatas by Alexei Ratmansky
- Rush© by Christopher Wheeldon

=== Program seven, Apr 7 - Apr 17 Mixed Program ===
- Continuum© by Christopher Wheeldon
- In the Countenance of Kings by Justin Peck
- Theme and Variations

=== Program eight, Apr 30 - May 8 Full length ===
- Onegin

== 2016 Company Roster ==
The company of the San Francisco Ballet:

=== Changes from 2015 season ===
- Soloist Dana Genshaft retired from dancing and joined the faculty of the San Francisco Ballet School.
- Soloist Clara Blanco left to be both a ballet teacher and head of the classical dance department at Escuela Profesional de Danza de Castilla y León, in Valladolid, Spain.
- Corps member Carolyn Lippert joined the corps de ballet of American Ballet Theatre in December 2015.
- Corps member Raymond Tilton joined Diablo Ballet in Walnut Creek, California.
- Corps member Kristina Lind joined the Dutch National Ballet
- Corps members Thomas Bieszka, Megan Amanda Ehrlich, Lacey Escabar, Emily Kadow, Shannon Marie Rugani, and Benjamin Stewart were removed from the roster for the 2016 season.
- Principals Pascal Molat and Joan Boada announced they would be retiring at the end of the 2016 season.
- Principal Gennadi Nedvigin announced he will retire from dancing in May 2016 to become the artistic director of the Atlanta Ballet.

==== Promotions and Additions ====
- San Francisco Ballet announced five promotions, four new Company members, and six apprentices for the 2016 Repertory Season:
  - Soloist Dores André has been promoted to principal dancer.
  - Lauren Strongin from Houston Ballet joined as a soloist.
  - Added to the corps de ballet were former SF Ballet Apprentices Samantha Bristow, Benjamin Freemantle, John-Paul Simoens, and Maggie Weirich, as well as Jahna Frantziskonis from Pacific Northwest Ballet, Alessandra Vassallo from Teatro alla Scala, and Kamryn Baldwin from the San Francisco Ballet School.
  - Grace Choi, Blake Kessler, Anastasia Kubanda, Haruo Niyama, Chisako Oga, and Francisco Sebastião of the San Francisco Ballet School were promoted to the rank of apprentice.
  - However, Alessandra Vassallo did not appear on the roster on www.sfballet.org during the 2016.

=== Dancers ===
==== Principal Dancers ====
Name	Nationality	Training	Other Companies	Principal Since	Notes
Dores André	Spain	Estudio de Danza de Maria Avila		2015	
Joan Boada	Cuba	Cuban National Ballet School	National Ballet of Cuba; The Australian Ballet; Royal Ballet of Flanders	1999	
Jaime Garcia Castilla	Spain	Royal Conservatory of Professional Dance		2008	
Frances Chung	Canada	Goh Ballet Academy		2009	
Taras Domitro	Cuba	Cuban National Ballet School	National Ballet of Cuba	2008	
Lorena Feijoo	Cuba	Cuban National Ballet School	National Ballet of Cuba; Royal Ballet of Flanders; Joffrey Ballet	1999	
Mathilde Froustey	France	Marseille National School of Ballet; Paris Opéra Ballet School	Paris Opéra Ballet	2013	
Tiit Helimets	Estonia	Tallinn Ballet School	Estonian National Ballet; Birmingham Royal Ballet	2005	
Luke Ingham	Australia	Australian Ballet School	The Australian BalletHouston Ballet	2014	
Davit Karapetyan	Armenia	Armenian School of Ballet; Schweizerische Ballettberufsschule	Zurich Ballet	2005	Named John and Barbara Osterweis Principal Dancer
Maria Kochetkova	Russia	Moscow State Academy of Choreography	The Royal Ballet; English National Ballet	2007	Named Herbert Family Principal Dancer
Vitor Luiz	Brazil	The Royal Ballet School	Birmingham Royal Ballet	2009	
Pascal Molat	France	Paris Opéra Ballet School	Royal Ballet of Flanders; Les Ballets de Monte-Carlo	2003	
Gennadi Nedvigin	Russia	Moscow State Academy of Choreography	Le Jeune Ballet de France; Moscow Renaissance Ballet	2000	
Carlos Quenedit	Cuba	Cuban National Ballet School	Cuban National BalletMiami City Ballet Joffrey Ballet	2014	
Sofiane Sylve	France	Centre de Danse l’Académie	Dutch National Ballet; New York City Ballet	2008	
Yuan Yuan Tan	China	Shanghai Dance School John Cranko School		1997	Named Richard C. Barker Principal Dancer
Sarah Van Patten	United States	Ballet Workshop of New England; Massachusetts Youth Ballet	Royal Danish Ballet	2007	Named Diana Dollar Knowles Principal Dancer
Joseph Walsh	United States	Walnut Hill School of the Arts; Houston Ballet II	Houston Ballet	2014	
Vanessa Zahorian	United States	Kirov Academy of Ballet; Central Pennsylvania Youth Ballet	Mariinsky Ballet	2002	Named Diane B. Wilsey Principal Dancer

==== Principal character dancers ====
- Ricardo Bustamante
- Val Caniparoli
- Rubén Martín Cintas
- Anita Paciotti

==== Soloists ====
- Sasha De Sola
- Daniel Deivison-Oliveira
- Carlo Di Lanno
- Koto Ishihara
- James Sofranko
- Jennifer Stahl
- Lauren Strongin
- Anthony Vincent
- Hansuke Yamamoto

==== Corps de Ballet ====
- Gaetano Amico III
- Kamryn Baldwin
- Sean Bennett
- Kimberly Braylock-Olivier
- Samantha Bristow
- Kristine Butler
- Max Cauthorn
- Thamires Chuvas
- Diego Cruz
- Isabella DeVivo
- Jahna Frantziskonis
- Benjamin Freemantle
- Jordan Hammond
- Jillian Harvey
- Esteban Hernandez
- Ellen Rose Hummel
- Norika Matsuyama
- Lee Alex Meyer-Lorey
- Steven Morse
- Francisco Mungamba
- Sean Orza
- Lauren Parrott
- Elizabeth Powell
- Alexander Reneff-Olson
- Aaron Renteria
- Rebecca Rhodes
- Julia Rowe
- Emma Rubinowitz
- Skyla Schreter
- Grace Shibley
- Henry Sidford
- Miranda Silveira
- John-Paul Simoens
- Myles Thatcher
- Mingxuan Wang
- Wei Wang
- Lonnie Weeks
- Maggie Weirich
- Ami Yuki
- WanTing Zhao

==== Apprentices ====
- Grace Choi
- Blake Kessler
- Anastasia Kubanda
- Chisako Oga
- Francisco Sebastião

==== Artistic Staff ====
- Artistic Director & Principal Choreographer: Helgi Tomasson
- Ballet Master & Assistant to the Artistic Director: Ricardo Bustamante
- Ballet Masters
  - Felipe Diaz
  - Betsy Erickson
  - Anita Paciotti
  - Katita Waldo
- Company Teachers
  - Helgi Tomasson
  - Ricardo Bustamante
  - Felipe Diaz
- Choreographer in Residence: Yuri Possokhov
- Music Director and Principal Conductor: Martin West
- Other Artistic Staff
  - Caroline Giese, Artistic Administrator
  - Alan Takata-Villareal, Logistics Manager
  - Abby Masters, Assistant to the Artistic Staff

=== Music Director and Musicians ===
- Music Director & Principal Conductor: Martin West

==== Strings ====
Violin I
Cordula Merks,Concertmaster	Mia Kim
Wenyi Shih, Acting Associate	Robin Hansen
Beni Shinohara, Assistant Concertmaster	Brian Lee
Heidi Wilcox	Mariya Borozina
Violin II
Marianne Wagner, Principal	Patricia Van Winkle
Craig Reiss, Associate Principal	Clifton Foster
Jeanelle Meyer, Assistant Principal	Elbert Tsai
Rebecca Jackson, Assistant Principal
Viola
Yi Zhou, Principal	Caroline Lee
Anna Kruger, Associate Principal	Paul Ehrlich
Joy Fellows, Assistant Principal
Cello
Eric Sung, Principal	Thalia Moore
Jonah Kim, Associate Principal	Nora Pirquet
Victor Fierro, Assistant Principal
Contrabass
Steven D'Amico,Principal	Jonathan Lancelle, Assistant Principal
Shinji Eshima, Associate Principal	Mark Drury
Harp
Annabelle Taubl, Principal

==== Woodwinds ====
Flute
Barbara Chaffe, Principal	Julie McKenzie, 2nd & Piccolo
Oboe
Laura Griffiths, Principal	Marilyn Coyne, 2nd & English Horn
Clarinet
Natalie Parker, Principal	Andrew Sandwick, 2nd & Bass Clarinet
Bassoon
Rufus Olivier, Principal	Patrick Johnson-Whitty, 2nd & Contrabassoon

==== Brass ====
Horn
Kevin Rivard, Principal	Keith Green
Brian McCarty, Associate Principal	Bill Klingelhoffer
Trumpet/Cornet
Adam Luftman, Principal	Ralph Wagner (Leave of Absence)
Conrad Jones(Season Substitute)
Trombone
Jeffrey Budin, Principal	Hall Goff
Bass Trombone
Scott Thornton, Principal
Tuba
Peter Wahrhaftig, Principal

==== Percussion ====
Timpani
James Gott, Principal
Percussion
David Rosenthal, Principal
