= Lorna Feijóo =

Cuban ballet dancer

- Born: 1974 or 1975 (age 51–52); Havana, Cuba
- Education: Cuban National Ballet School
- Spouse: Nelson Madrigal (m. 2000)
- Career
- Former groups: Boston Ballet; Cuban National Ballet; Cincinnati Ballet
- Website: www.feijooballetschool.com

Lorna Feijóo (born 1974 or 1975) is a Cuban former ballet dancer. Her career started at the Cuban National Ballet, where she rose through the ranks. She left Cuba in 2001, then spent two years with the Cincinnati Ballet, before joining the Boston Ballet in 2003, where she remained as a principal dancer until she retired. Her sister, Lorena Feijóo, was also a ballet dancer.

== Early life and training ==
Feijóo was born in Havana. Her mother was a dancer with the Cuban National Ballet and later a ballet teacher, and her father was an actor. Her sister, Lorena Feijóo, would later be a principal dancer of the San Francisco Ballet. Lorna initially wanted to "just do a bit of everything and decide later," but was "mesmerized" by seeing her sister dance and decided to do the same. Her mother initially discouraged her from pursuing ballet, fearing competition between the sisters, and advised her to choose modern dance instead, though at age ten, Lorna sneaked into a Cuban National Ballet School audition and was accepted. Under the direction of Cuban National Ballet founder Alicia Alonso, she received Russian, French, American and Cuban styles trainings. Lorena left Cuba while Lorna was a student.

== Career ==
Feijóo joined the Cuban National Ballet when she was eighteen. She made her company debut in Swan Lake at the National Theatre of Cuba. By then, Alicia Alonso had retired from performing and finally women were given more opportunities. She rose through the ranks, and received critical acclaim for her performances in both Cuba and on international tours, including in Swan Lake and Giselle. In return, she was allowed to perform with a ballet company abroad.

The Joffrey Ballet, a company based in Chicago, where her sister was dancing at the time, once offered a guest contract to Feijóo, but she was unable to join due to visa issues. Instead, in 1997, she and Nelson Madrigal, her colleague and future husband, performed with Ballett Zürich, directed by Heinz Spoerli, as a guest for a year, and met ballet master Mikko Nissinen. They returned to Cuba after their contracts ended. In 2000, she was coached by former New York City Ballet principal dancer Merrill Ashley for Balanchine's Ballo della Regina. In 2001, Feijóo and Madrigal, now married, left Cuba and joined Cincinnati Ballet. Victoria Morgan, the company's director, spotted her in Havana. In Cincinnati, one of the ballets the couple danced was Balanchine's Tchaikovsky Pas de Deux.

In 2003, Feijóo joined the Boston Ballet as a principal dancer. Nissinen, who had become the artistic director of the company, had tried to hire Feijóo since he assumed the role. In 2004, Lorna and Lorena Feijóo performed together for the first time, in a one-night-only Boston Ballet performance of Swan Lake, with Lorna as Odette and Lorena as Odile, roles normally performed by the same dancer. Madrigal partnered both of them. At the company, in addition to classical, she also danced works by George Balanchine, John Cranko, Jiří Kylián, William Forsythe, Val Caniparoli and Peter Martins.

Outside of the Boston Ballet, Feijóo had also performed with The Royal Ballet, American Ballet Theatre and New York City Ballet. With the latter, she and then-San Francisco Ballet principal dancer Gonzalo Garcia performed Balanchine's Ballo della Regina, for Balanchine's centennial celebration. In 2008, the Feijóo sisters appeared on Sesame Street, dancing Caniparoli's Lambarena. In 2011, the Feijóos and American Ballet Theatre principal dancer José Manuel Carreño performed a specially choreographed version of Swan Lake on Dancing with the Stars. Alonso gave Feijóo an open invitation to perform in Cuba.

Feijóo remained in the Boston Ballet until her retirement. She went on to direct the Feijóo Ballet School in Dickinson, Texas, and taught at Carlos Acosta's Acosta/Danza in Havana as a guest teacher.

== Personal life ==
In 1997, Feijóo began dating fellow Cuban dancer Nelson Madrigal, who would also be a principal dancer with the Boston Ballet. They married in 2000.
