= Joan Boada =

Cuban ballet dancer

- Born: 1974 or 1975 (age 50–51); Havana, Cuba
- Education: Cuban National Ballet School
- Occupation: Ballet dancer
- Career
- Current group: Boston Ballet II
- Former groups: San Francisco Ballet; Cuban National Ballet

Joan Boada (born 1974 or 1975) is a Cuban retired ballet dancer, teacher and ballet master. His career started at the Cuban National Ballet, where he was promoted to principal dancer at age 16. He defected to France in 1994, then performed with several companies and as a guest, before joining the San Francisco Ballet as a principal dancer in 1999. After he retired from performing in 2016, he worked as a guest teacher and répétiteur. In 2019, he joined the Spanish National Dance Company as ballet master and choreographic assistant. In 2021, he became the artistic director of both Conservatory Ballet and Kirov Academy of Ballet. In 2022, Boada became the associate director of Boston Ballet II.

== Early life and training ==
Boada was born in Havana. He was sent to ballet classes at age nine by his mother, in order to keep him away from the streets. He trained at Cuban National Ballet School under Alicia Alonso.

== Career ==
Boada was chosen to join the Cuban National Ballet by Alonso, who promoted him to principal dancer when he was 16. He was soon cast as Franz in her production of Coppélia, and had also dance with Alonso. In 1994, while the company was touring in Mexico City, Boada defected to France. Following his defection, he joined Jeune Ballet de France, a touring company. He also performed with Roland Petit's Ballet National de Marseille, the Royal Ballet of Flanders and the Australian Ballet, and as a guest artist. He later recalled that he had requested Alonso to let him dance at Jeune Ballet de France, but Alonso refused and said he would not learn anything abroad. Though he could return to Cuba via his French passport, he has not performed in his home country since he was 18.

In 1999, Boada joined the San Francisco Ballet, despite also receiving offers from Paris Opera Ballet and American Ballet Theatre. He had previously performed with the San Francisco Ballet in two galas and in Landar's Études. In early March 2003, it was announced that Boada would be one of four dancers whose contracts would not be renewed, due to budget deficit, though he was expected to continue to perform until the season's conclusion. However, by the end of the month, the decision to dismiss Boada was reversed. The following year, he and Lorena Feijóo won the Isadora Duncan Dance Award for Ensemble Performance, for their performances in Don Quixote.

His repertory in San Francisco include lead roles in full-length classics and works by George Balanchine, Jerome Robbins, Mark Morris, Helgi Tómasson, Christopher Wheeldon and Yuri Possokhov. His role creations include Wheeldon's Within the Golden Hour, Tómasson's 7 for Eight. and On a Theme of Paganini, Possokhov's Magrittomania, Fusion, and Diving into the Lilacs.

In 2016, the 40-year-old Boada retired from the San Francisco Ballet, and stated he wanted to focus on being a ballet master and teacher. In April, a one-night-only program was held to celebrate him, Pascal Molat and Gennadi Nedvigin, two other retiring principal dancers. Though the program was initially reported to be his last performance with the company, he later appeared as Prince Gremin in Cranko's Onegin. In 2017, Boada was one of the Sustained Achievement Honorees at the Isadora Duncan Dance Awards.

After Boada retired from performing, he worked as a guest teacher at various schools, as well as répétiteur at the San Francisco Ballet and Boston Ballet. In 2019, he joined the Spanish National Dance Company as ballet master and choreographic assistant. After a two year stint, he returned to the United States in 2021 to serve as the artistic director of the Reston, Virginia-based Conservatory Ballet. In September that year, he was appointed the artistic director of the Kirov Academy of Ballet in Washington D.C., amid leadership changes and an embezzlement scandal. In November, Kirov announced to parents that it will close in May 2022 for financial reasons. In June 2022, Boada became the associate director of Boston Ballet II, Boston Ballet's second company.
