= Theme and Variations (ballet) =

Ballet by George Balanchine

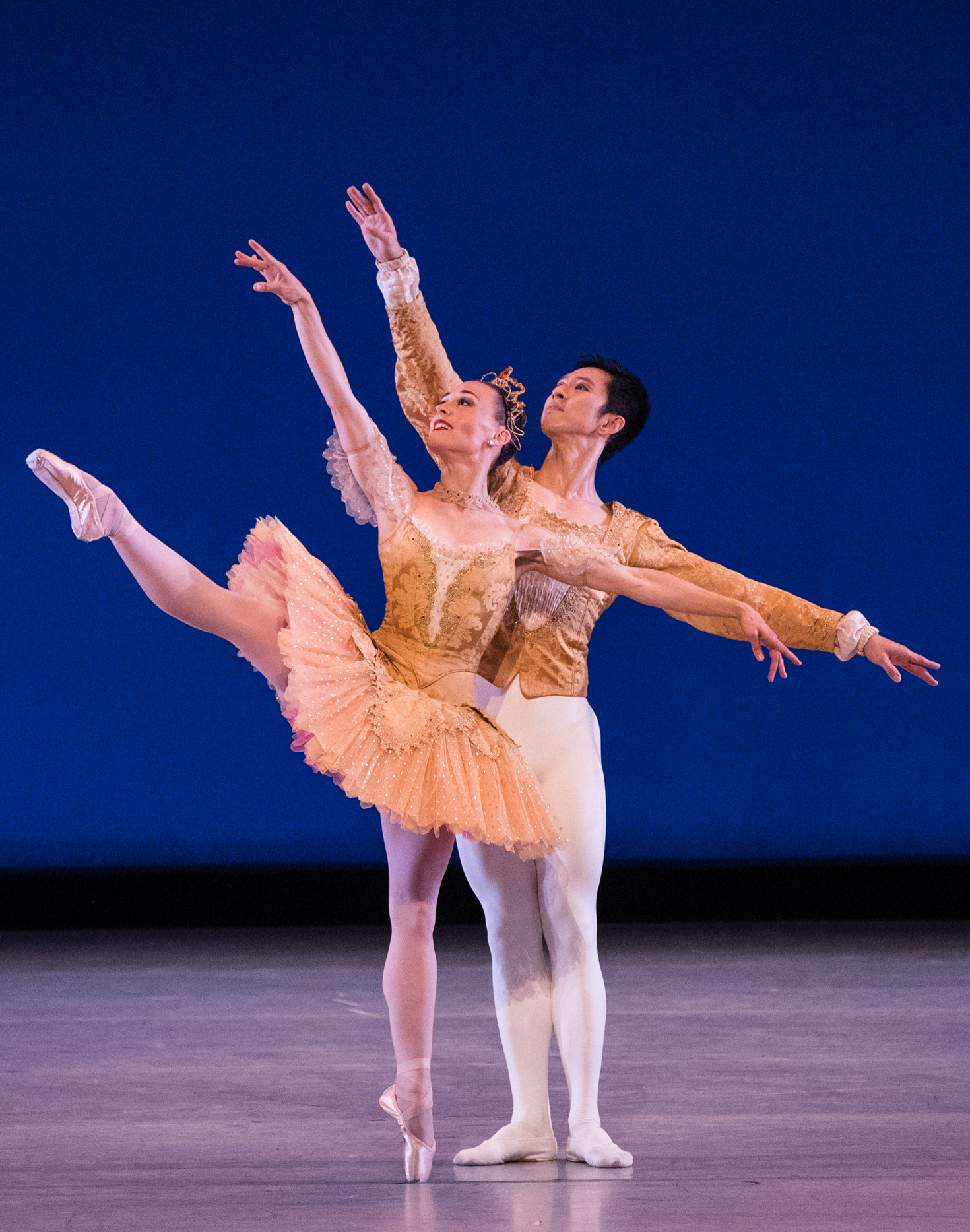
- Kansas City Ballet's Tempe Ostergren and Liang Fu in Theme and Variations
- Choreographer: George Balanchine
- Music: Peter Ilyitch Tschaikovsky
- Premiere: November 26, 1947; City Center 55 Street Theater
- Original ballet company: Ballet Theatre
- Created for: Alicia Alonso; Igor Youskevitch

Theme and Variations is a ballet choreographed by George Balanchine to the final movement of Tchaikovsky's Orchestral Suite No. 3. The ballet was created for Ballet Theatre (now American Ballet Theatre), and first performed in 1947. The ballet was greeted as a masterpiece at its premiere, has been staged since then by ballet companies around the world, and has remained a favorite of both critics and audiences. In 1970, Balanchine incorporated Theme and Variations into Suite No. 3 (now titled Tschaikovsky Suite No. 3), (Note: At the New York City Ballet, the composer's last name is spelled "Tschaikovsky" rather than "Tchaikovsky" as he used the former spelling during a visit to New York in 1891.) performed by the New York City Ballet, though Theme and Variations continues to be performed on its own as well.

== Production ==
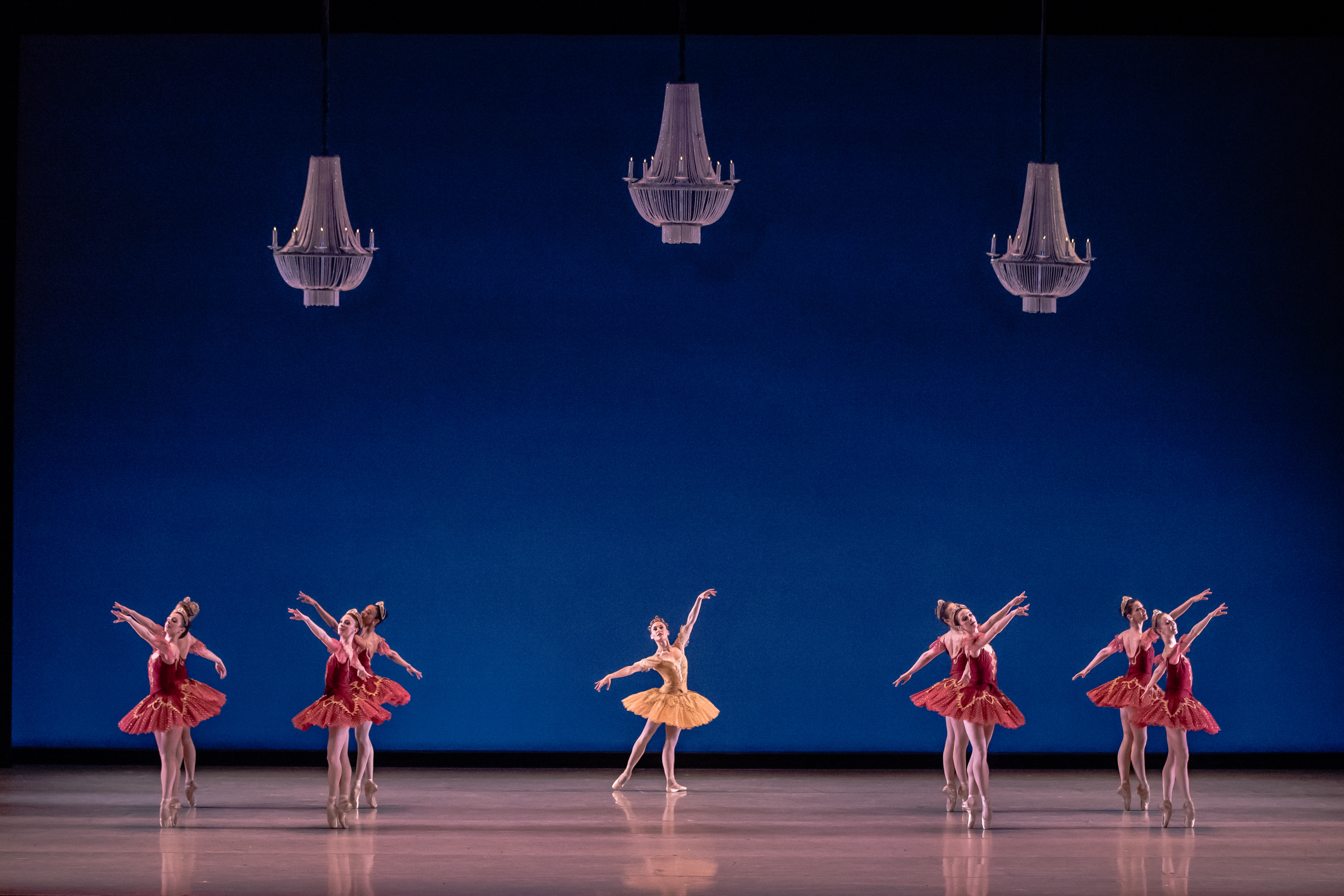
Tempe Ostergren and Kansas City Ballet dancers Theme and Variations

Balanchine's Theme and Variations is set to the final movement of Tchaikovsky's Orchestral Suite No. 3. It was commissioned by Lucia Chase for Ballet Theatre (now American Ballet Theatre). The sets and costumes of the original production were designed by Woodman Thompson.

The ballet is plotless and abstract. Like Ballet Imperial (now titled Tschaikovsky Piano Concerto No. 2), Balanchine made Theme and Variations as a tribute to the Imperial Russian ballet style, and he wrote that the ballet was intended "to evoke that great period in classical dancing when Russian ballet flourished with the aid of Tchaikovsky's music." It is also regarded as his tribute to Imperial Russian Theater and the ballet The Sleeping Beauty.

The ballet features a lead couple, created on Alicia Alonso and Igor Youskevitch, plus four soloists and a corps de ballet. Mary Ellen Moylan, who had trained under Balanchine, was offered the female principal role and was asked to join Ballet Theatre, though she opted to rejoin Ballet Russe de Monte Carlo. While making the ballet, Youskevitch and Balanchine disagreed as the former wanted to dance like a prince from Swan Lake or Giselle, but Balanchine wanted him to focus on the steps only. Alonso previously believed that ballet cannot be abstract, and stated she "always have a feeling of being just behind the music" during rehearsals with Balanchine. She also said Balanchine kept giving her and Youskevitch more "complex steps," hoping to eliminate their personalities. However, the presence of their personalities remained obvious. In rehearsals, Balanchine neither criticized nor approved them, although Youskevitch was convinced that their "romanticized" interpretations were not accepted by Balanchine. Alonso nevertheless noted she "learned a lot" through Theme and Variations, especially "to listen to each instrument individually," which became helpful when her eyesight got worse.

== Premiere ==
Theme and Variations premiered on November 26, 1947, at the City Center 55 Street Theater. It was well-received by both critics and the audience. Lincoln Kirstein, who co-founded the Ballet Society with Balanchine, was pleased that Balanchine achieved success, but jealous that it was with another company. In a letter to Igor Stravinsky on Boxing Day 1947, Kirstein wrote that he and Pavel Tchelitchev both thought Theme and Variations was not Balanchine's best work, "but it appealed madly to the public," and believed that Balanchine had "become recognized" after spending fifteen years in the United States. (Alonso commented, "Perhaps he [Kirstein] was in a bad mood. He was very intelligent; he knew when something was good, and this ballet was good.")

== Original cast ==
- Alicia Alonso
- Melissa Hayden
- Paula Lloyd
- Cynthia Riseley
- Anna Cheselka
- Igor Youskevitch
- Fernando Alonso
- Fernand Nault
- Zachary Solov
- Eric Braun

== Revivals ==
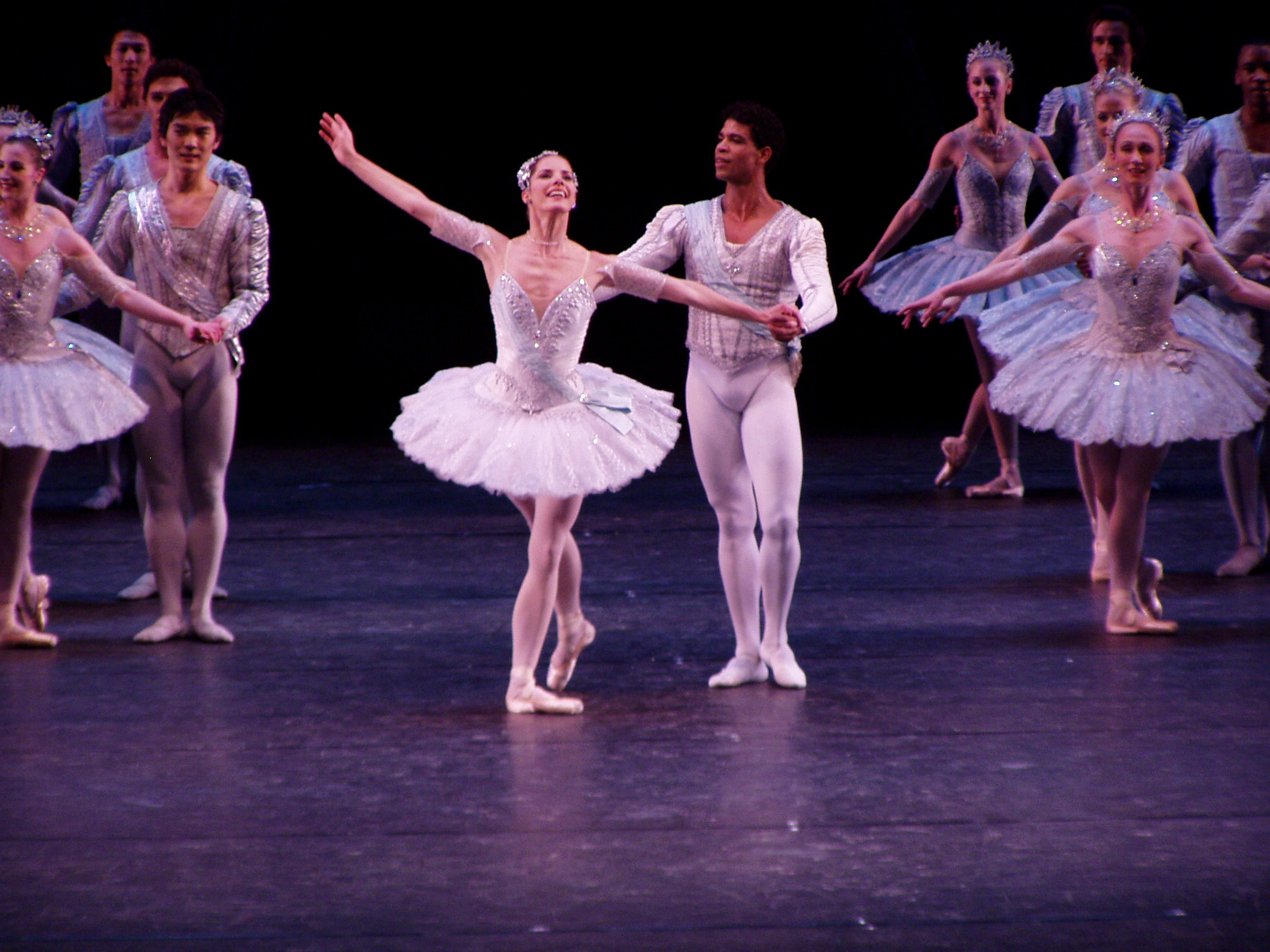
The Royal Ballet's Darcey Bussell and Carlos Acosta at the curtain call of Theme and Variations

Balanchine debut as an orchestral conductor during a Ballet Theatre performance of Theme and Variations in December 1947. Months after the world premiere of Theme and Variations, the ballet was performed in Cuba, Alicia Alonso's home country, with her and original cast members Igor Youskevitch, Melissa Hayden and Fernando Alonso, alongside members of Ballet Alicia Alonso (now Cuban National Ballet).

Balanchine's company, the New York City Ballet, performed Theme and Variations for the first time in 1960, with the two lead roles danced by Violette Verdy and Edward Villella respectively. However, Verdy had already danced the ballet with Ballet Theatre before. The costumes of this production were designed by Karinska.

In 1970, when Balanchine made Suite No. 3, (now titled Tschaikovsky Suite No. 3), a ballet to the whole suite, he incorporated the choreography of Theme and Variations. At the premiere, the Theme and Variations portion was danced by Edward Villella and Gelsey Kirkland.

Other ballet companies that had performed Theme and Variations include The Royal Ballet, Kirov Ballet, San Francisco Ballet, Dutch National Ballet, Birmingham Royal Ballet, Boston Ballet, Pacific Northwest Ballet, Houston Ballet, Royal Danish Ballet and Les Grands Ballets Canadiens.

== Reception ==
Reviewing the premiere for The New York Times, John Martin called Theme and Variations "brilliant, stimulating and beautiful... Never before have Mr. Balanchine's invention, his musicianship, his style, his method been so fresh, so spontaneous and so perfectly blended." Sarah Crompton, writing in The Observer in 2025, described Theme as "a perfect embellishment of pure ballet." Also in 2025, Rupert Christiansen wrote in The Spectator that "I could watch Balanchine's Theme and Variations on repeat." That same year, Ana Claudia Paixão wrote that Theme and Variations "is a work that reveals the essence of Balanchine's genius: his ability to transform memory into geometry, history into abstraction, and music into dance so exact that it seems inevitable. More than seventy years later, the ballet has not aged."
