= Norwegian National Opera and Ballet =

Company in Oslo, Norway

- Den Norske Opera & Ballett
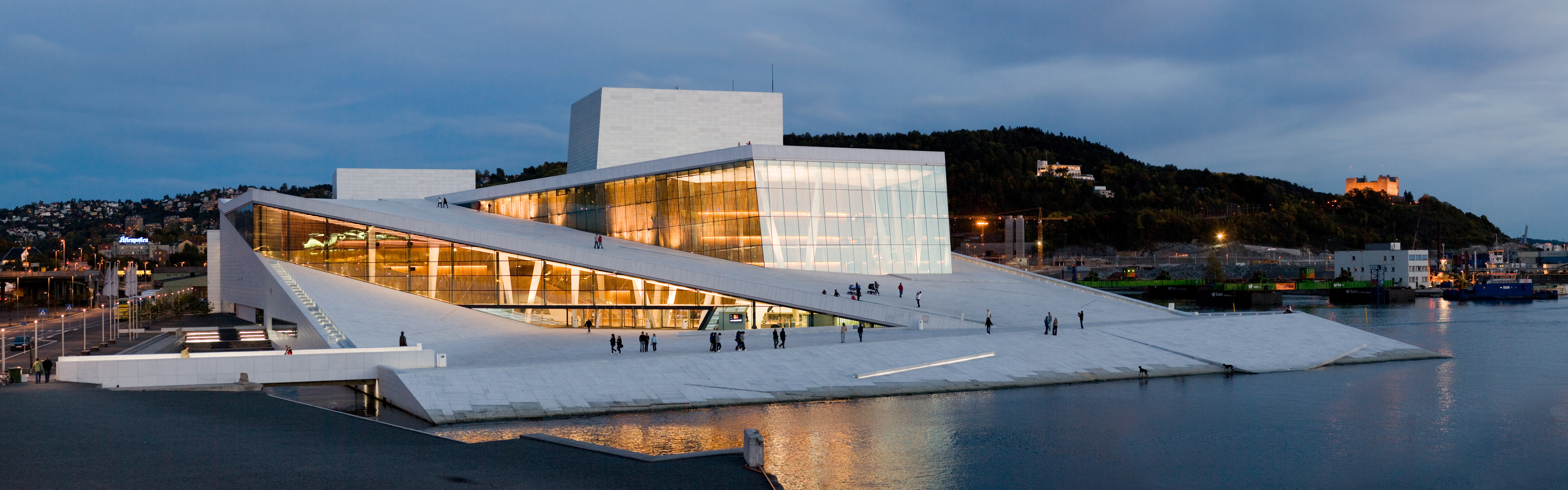
- Interactive map of Norwegian National Opera and Ballet
- Location: Oslo Opera House, Oslo, Norway
- Coordinates: 59°54′27″N 10°45′11″E
- Type: National opera, national ballet

Construction
- Opened: 1957

Website
- operaen.no

The Norwegian National Opera and Ballet (Norwegian: Den Norske Opera & Ballett) is a Norwegian opera company and ballet company. The first fully professional company each for opera and ballet in Norway and the only such professional organisation in the country, it is currently resident at the Oslo Opera House, since the spring of 2008.

== History ==
Founded in 1957, the company had Kirsten Flagstad as its first general manager, from 1958 to 1960, and placed an emphasis on presenting operas and ballets written by Norwegian composers, and Norwegian as the standard language of the opera singers. Subsequent general managers have included Bjørn Simensen. The Ballet School at the Norwegian National Opera & Ballet was founded in 1965. In January 2009, the Norwegian Opera and Ballet was reorganized, during the tenure of Tom Remlov as general managing director. The company's current general manager is Nils Are Karstad Lysø.

In the 1980s and 1990s, Den Norske Opera campaigned for a number of years for construction of a new opera house, with preference in the Bjørvika district, a harbour area of downtown Oslo. The Oslo Opera House was opened in the spring of 2008. In 2008 Radio Marconi, an Italian company, installed a seatback multimedia system, from an idea of Geir Mortil of the Norwegian National Opera & Ballet, allowing audiences to follow opera libretto in other languages in addition to the original language.

The current chief executive officer of the company is Geir Bergkastet. Past artistic directors of the opera company have included Paul Curran (2009–2011), Anne Gjevang (as interim director), Per Boye Hansen and Annilese Miskimmon (2017–20). Randi Stene is the current opera director of the company. The company's current director of ballet is Ingrid Lorentzen, who succeeded Espen Giljane in the post. Past music directors have included John Fiore. In February 2022, the company announced the appointment of Edward Gardner as its artistic advisor, with immediate effect, and as its next music director, effective 1 August 2024.

== The company ==
=== Principal dancers ===
Name	Nationality	Training	Other companies (inc. guest performances)
Alex Cuadros Joglar	Spain	Real Conservatorio Profesional de Danza Mariemma Royal Ballet School	Norwegian National Ballet 2 Ballet Nice Méditerranée
Dingkai Bai	China	Royal Ballet School	Dutch National Ballet
Douwe Dekkers	Netherlands	Vienna Conservatory Royal Ballet School	Vienna State Ballet Dutch National Ballet
Grete Sofie Borud Nybakken	Norway	Royal Conservatory of The Hague Royal Ballet School	Bolshoi Ballet
Lucas Lima	Brazil	Royal Ballet School	The Royal Ballet
Melissa Hough	United States	Kirov Academy of Ballet	Boston Ballet Houston Ballet
Ricardo Castellanos	SpainCuba	Catalunya Ballet Youth Company Rodolfo Castellanos Royal Ballet School	Norwegian National Ballet 2 English National Ballet
Samantha Lynch	Australia	Australian Conservatoire of Ballet	San Francisco Ballet Houston Ballet
Silas Henriksen	Norway	Oslo National Academy of the Arts	Nederlands Dans Theater
Whitney Jensen	United States	Valentina Kozlova	Boston Ballet
Yolanda Correa	Cuba	Vocational School of Arts, Holguín Cuban National Ballet School	Cuban National Ballet

=== Corps de ballet ===
- Alberto Ballester
- Alicia Rose Couvrette
- Anaïs Touret
- Andrew Coffey
- Anna Sheleg
- Arianna Maldini
- Astrid Lyngstad
- Celine Kraal
- Daniela Cabrera
- Dmytro Litvinov
- Elise Nøkling-Eide
- Erik Murzagaliyev
- Freya Thomas Murzagaliyev
- Gabriel Gudim
- Gina Storm-Jensen
- Giuseppe Ventura
- Hana Nonaka Aillon
- Idun Sofie Landgraff Bækken
- Isaac Martin
- Isabel Vila
- Isabella Boyd
- James Linus Lynch
- Jane Park
- Joakim Visnes
- Johanne Wien Pedersen
- Jonathan Olofsson
- Josh Nagaoka
- Julie Petanova
- Kenji Wilkie
- Klara Brænne
- Leonardo Basilio
- Leyna Magbutay
- Louka Do Vale Tinoco
- Marchela Marinova
- Marco Pagetti
- Martin Dauchez
- Mathias Tannæs
- Miharu Maki
- Nae Nishimura
- Natasha Jones Dale
- Nora Elise Augustinius
- Pedro Alcantara
- Pol Monsech
- Riccardo Ambrogi
- Shaakir Muhammad
- Simon McNally
- Simon Regourd
- Sonia Vinograd
- Taeryeong Kim
- Thea Gudim Breder
- Tsukino Tanaka
- Vasilii Tkachenko
- Veronika Selivanova
- Youngseo Ko

== See also ==
- Henny Mürer
- Radio Marconi
