= Lorena Feijóo =

Cuban ballet dancer

- Born: 1970 or 1971 (age 53–54); Havana, Cuba
- Education: Cuban National Ballet School
- Occupation: ballet dancer
- Spouse: Vitor Luiz (divorced)
- Children: 1
- Career
- Current group: Bay Area Houston Ballet & Theatre
- Former groups: San Francisco Ballet; Cuban National Ballet; Royal Ballet of Flanders; Joffrey Ballet

Lorena Feijóo (born 1970 or 1971) is a Cuban former ballet dancer. Her dance career started in 1988 at the Cuban National Ballet, but left Cuba two years later for more opportunities. After stints at Ballet de Monterrey, Royal Ballet of Flanders and Joffrey Ballet, she joined the San Francisco Ballet in 1999 as a principal dancer, and retired in 2017. She then became an associate artistic director of Bay Area Houston Ballet & Theatre. Her sister, Lorna Feijóo, was also a ballet dancer.

== Early life and training ==
Lorena Feijóo was born in Havana. Her mother was a member of Cuban National Ballet before becoming a ballet teacher, while her father was an actor. Her younger sister, Lorna, would later be a principal dancer with Boston Ballet. Lorena became interested in ballet after watching her mother. However, her mother initially discouraged her to pursue ballet because ballet training in Cuba is "very competitive, the hours are grueling." At age nine, when she was old enough, Feijóo entered the Cuban National Ballet School, which she described as "excruciatingly good." At the school, she received her ballet training under Alicia Alonso, the co-founder of the Cuban National Ballet, in Russian, French, American and Cuban styles, and also studied folk dance, acting, piano, arts, Spanish and French. One of her frequent partners at the school was José Manuel Carreño, who became a principal dancer with the American Ballet Theatre. She graduated at eighteen, having trained as both a dancer and a teacher.

== Career ==
In 1988, at age eighteen, Feijóo joined the Cuban National Ballet. After spending a year in the corps de ballet, she was cast in solo and principal roles, but less often than she expected, though she was a favourite of Fernando Alonso, a co-founder of the company, who called her his "Tropical Beauty." In 1990, at age 20, she left the company and Cuba as Alicia Alonso restricted Feijóo's opportunities to perform abroad. She recalled Alonso telling her, "Lorena, either you're in or you're out. You choose." She chose to leave Cuba, and was granted a visa by the Ministry of Culture to leave the country without defecting. Despite other dancers' efforts, she had not perform in Cuba since, even though several other Cuban dancers who went abroad were able to return. She added Alonso's preference of classical ballets is also a reason for her departure, but not politics.

In 1991, she joined Ballet de Monterrey, ran by Ann Marie DeAngelo, where she worked with former American Ballet Theatre principal dancer Cynthia Gregory, followed by two years in Belgium as a principal dancer with the Royal Ballet of Flanders. In 1995, Feijóo moved to the United States to join the Los Angeles Ballet, but never performed with the company as it went bankrupt and disbanded. DeAngelo, who had become the associate artistic director of the Chicago-based Joffrey Ballet, recruited Feijóo. She remained in the company for four years, and left when she found herself "repeating the same repertory."

In 1999, she was hired by the San Francisco Ballet. She was initially offered a soloist contract but Helgi Tomasson, the artistic director of the company, allowed her to join as a principal dancer after Evelyn Cisneros and Sabina Allemann both retired the same year. She made her company debut in Nervi, Italy, when the company was on tour. The following year, she made her debut as the title role in Giselle, her favourite role, and was coached by Natalia Makarova for the Kingdom of Shades scene in La Bayadère. In 2002, she learned Balanchine's Ballo della Regina from former New York City Ballet principal dancer Merrill Ashley. She also considers dancing Kitri in Don Quixote a highlight of her career. Choreographers she had worked with include Val Caniparoli, Yuri Possokhov and Liam Scarlett, including in Possokhov's Swimmer.

Outside of the San Francisco Ballet, Feijóo had performed with the Bolshoi Ballet, American Ballet Theatre and Cuban Classical Ballet of Miami. In 2004, Lorena and Lorna Feijóo performed together for the first time, in a one-night-only Boston Ballet performance of Swan Lake, with Lorna as Odette and Lorena as Odile, roles usually performed by the same dancer. Lorna's husband, Nelson Madrigal, partnered both of them. In 2005, Lorena acted for the first time in Andy García's film The Lost City as a Cuban nightclub dancer, with the dance sequence choreographed by herself with her mother's assistance. In 2008, the Feijóo sisters appeared on Sesame Street, performing Caniparoli's Lambarena. In 2011, the sisters and José Manuel Carreño performed a rendition of Swan Lake on Dancing with the Stars.

In 2017, her final year in the San Francisco Ballet, Feijóo was also tasked with coaching other dancers. She left the company after a mixed-bill program in April 2017. She then gave her farewell performances as a ballet dancer in June, with Cuban Classical Ballet of Miami, in Pas de Quatre. Later that year, she performed in two San Francisco Opera productions, in Verdi's La traviata and the world premiere of Adams' Girls of the Golden West as Lola Montez. After she stopped performing, she became an associated artistic director of the Texas-based Bay Area Houston Ballet & Theatre.

== Personal life ==
Feijóo was married to fellow principal dancer Vitor Luiz for seven years before they divorced. Their daughter was born in 2012.
