= Viengsay Valdés =

Cuban ballerina (born 1977)

Viengsay Valdés Herrera
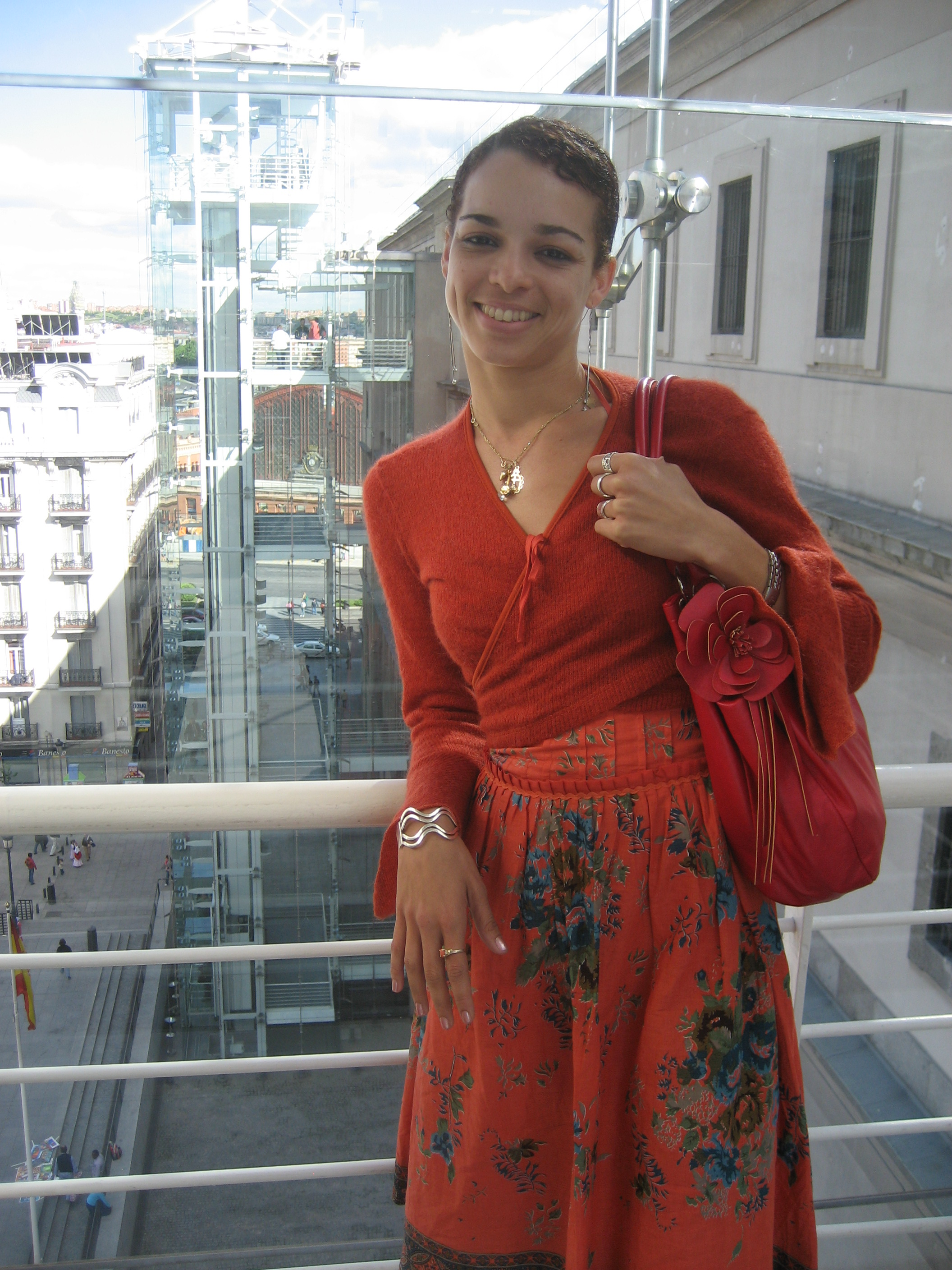
- Valdés in Madrid 2007
- Born: 10 November 1976 (age 49); Havana, Cuba
- Education: Alejo Carpentier Provincial Ballet School, National Art Schools (Cuba), Ballet Nacional de Cuba
- Occupation: Ballet dancer
- Parent(s): Clara Herrera Rivero, Roberto Valdés Muñóz

Viengsay Valdés is a Cuban ballerina. Since 2003, Valdés is the Prima ballerina and since 2019 she is the Artistic Director of the National Ballet of Cuba (in Spanish: Ballet Nacional de Cuba).

Valdés developed a reputation as a dancer for her interpretations of the female lead roles in the ballets, Carmen, Giselle, Swan Lake, Blood Wedding, Don Quixote, Romeo and Juliet, The Sleeping Beauty, Cinderella, Coppélia, La Fille Mal Gardée, and The Nutcracker. She also danced in notable pas de deux from Le Corsaire, Diana and Actaeon, Silvia, and Black Swan (El Cisne Negro).

== Early life and education ==
Viengsay Valdés Herrera was born in Havana, Cuba in 1976. Valdés and her family moved when she was three months old to Laos, where her father served as the Cuban Ambassador. Her name Viengsay means “victory” in Laotian. At age three, her family moved to the Seychelles. At age six, she moved back to Havana, Cuba, where she continued her education. She has suffered from severe asthma, since her early childhood.

Valdés put her first ballet shoes on at the age of nine, which is when she began her ballet studies at the Alejo Carpentier Provincial Ballet School (Escuela Nacional de Ballet Alejo Carpentier) in Havana. At age 15, she continued her studies at the National Art Schools (Escuela Nacional de Arte or ENA). Ramona de Sáa was her main ballet professors. While she was still a student she won numerous prizes and distinctions.

Legendary ballet director and educator, Alicia Alonso spotted Valdés' talent, and invited her to join the Ballet Nacional de Cuba in 1994, when she was 17 years old.

Every year since 1994, Valdés has been a participant in the prestigious International Ballet Festival of Havana. She was named the most outstanding dancer in the XVIII International Festival of Ballet of Havana (October 20–28, 2002).

== Principal dancer ==
Valdés had a series of fast promotions with the National Ballet of Cuba, in 1995 to Principal Dancer, and in 2001 to Premier Dancer. In the mid-1990s many ballet dancers while on tour were defecting to other countries, this provided more advancement in dance opportunities within the National Ballet of Cuba for dancers, like Valdés that stayed in their home country.

In 2003, Alicia Alonso made Valdés the company's Prima Ballerina Assoluta, the highest position for a dancer in Cuba. From then on, she took the leading roles in all the company's major galas and she has performed and toured internationally.

Valdés ballet partners have include leading figures of world dance such as, Carlos Acosta, Leonid Sarafanov, Thiago Soares, Alexei Tyukov, Ivan Vasiliev, Denis Matvienko, Joel Carreño, Ivan Putrov, among others.

In July 2012, she performed in the special Homage Gala dedicated to Alicia Alonso, sharing the stage with The Royal Ballet of London in the Gran Teatro de La Habana. On this occasion, she danced the famous 'Black Swan' pas de deux with the ballet star Thiago Soares, premier dancer from the Royal Ballet.

== Dance performances ==
Valdes' performances have received outstanding reviews from the world's leading dance critics, including Anna Kisselgoff and Jennifer Dunning of The New York Times, and Lewis Segal of the Los Angeles Times, among others.

=== Swan Lake ===
A few days ago, someone gave me a filmed version of 'Swan Lake', a subject about which I am far from being an expert, but which in the current circumstances constitutes a very agreeable way of forgetting almost all the time. I observed for almost two hours the incredible performance of the greatest interpreter of this ballet in the world: Viengsay Valdes, daughter of a Cuban diplomatic couple, who gave her the name in honor of a region of Laos where they were representing Cuba. One European critic described it as an unrepeatable performance. I think the same. I never conceived of such amazing elegance and flexibility, with perfect precision.

— Fidel Castro, March 2008,

=== Don Quixote ===
At the age of 19, Valdés debut in the role of Kitri in Don Quixote.

"Two exceptional young dancers, Joel Carreño and Viengsay Valdés, led the exuberant version of "Don Quixote" that opened a run by the Ballet Nacional de Cuba on Wednesday, continuing through Sunday at City Center. New York has seen enough of this company over 30 years to do away with facile stereotypes. Alicia Alonso, now 82, was on hand for a standing ovation at the end of the evening, and it is worth remembering that the company is an outgrowth of the troupe she founded in 1948 in Havana with members of American Ballet Theatre, where she was a star. As Kitri, Ms. Valdés can bring the house down with her phenomenal balances on one leg, and she is very much a turner. Yet these are technical feats that are only part of the complete picture she gives. She relates to her partner and everyone onstage, fusing characterization with style and technique. Her Kitri is not a pouting poppet but a strong-minded heroine with a brain whose love for Basil radiates throughout the performance."

— Anna Kisselgoff, The New York Times, 2003,

In September 2006, Valdés and the National Ballet of Cuba performed Don Quixote in London.

She traveled to Washington DC, to work as a guest artist in the 2009–2010 season opening performance for The Washington Ballet, Don Quixote in the Kennedy Center's Eisenhower Theater. Dancing the lead role of Kitri, this was a new staging of the classic ballet by internationally recognized choreographer Anna-Marie Holmes.

== Artistic director ==
In January 2019, Valdés was advanced by the Cuban ministry of culture and Alicia Alonso to the role of Deputy Artistic Director of the National Ballet of Cuba. In October 2019, after Alonso died at age 99, the Cuban ministry of culture promoted her to the Artistic Director. She is now in charge of all the artistic and technical aspects of National Ballet of Cuba, including the casting, organizing ballet tours, and programming. National Ballet of Cuba's 2020 home ballet performances will be Alonso-focused in commemorations of Alonso's centennial and starting in 2021, Valdés will have full control.

As of May 2019, Valdés intendeds to continue dancing with the troupe.

== Choreography ==
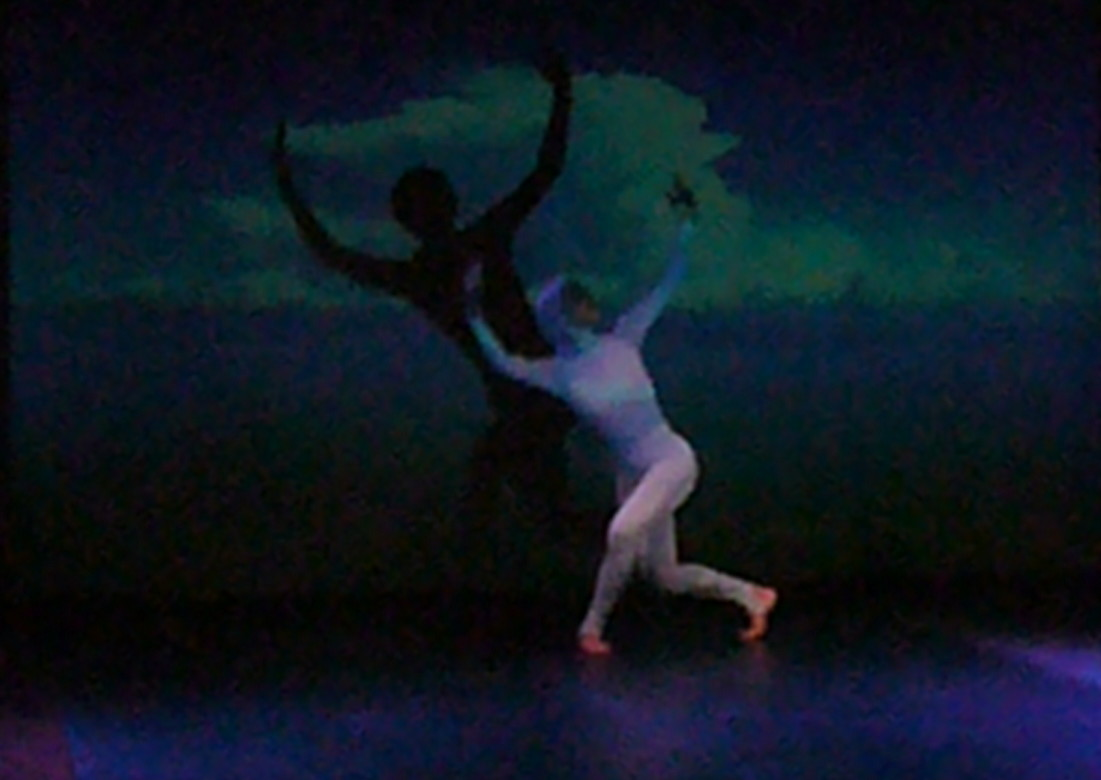
Valdés in Balance of Ice (2007)

In June 2007, Valdes branched out into contemporary dance choreography, working with the British director Sebastian Doggart. They created a performance called Balance of Ice, which combined three elements: a piece of music by Canadian composer Andrew Staniland that was inspired by the sounds of ice sheets calving; a dance performance by Valdes that fragmented her usual balletic virtuosity; and moving images of the polar ice caps and the threats facing them.

== Awards and recognition ==
- 1993 - First Prize in the National Competition of Dance for the Union of Artists and Writers of Cuba (UNEAC).
- 1993 – Gold Medal in the Vignale Festival of Dance, Italy.
- 1994 – Grand Prize in Ballet for the National Competition of Dance, Union of Artists and Writers of Cuba (UNEAC).
- 1999 – National Medal of Culture from Cuba
- 2003 – Valdés was awarded the Medal "Alejo Carpentier" by the Ministry of Culture of Cuba.
- 2004 - Named one of Dance Magazine's "25 to Watch".
- 2005 - Awarded the Les Ètoiles de Ballet 2000 prize at the Palais des Festivals, Cannes.

In April 2009, the Union of Artists and Writers of Cuba (UNEAC) awarded her the Dance Prize for outstanding female performance during the 2007–2008 season.

== Publications ==
- Tablada Perez, Carlos (2014). De Acero y Nube. Biografía de Viengsay Valdés [Steel and Cloud, Viengsay Valdés Biography]. Cuba: Ruth Casa Editorial. ASIN B01HGG9VNC.
