= List of San Francisco Ballet 2014 repertory =

San Francisco Ballet dances each year at the War Memorial Opera House, San Francisco, and tours; this is the list of ballets with casts for the 2014 season beginning with the gala, Wednesday, January 22, 2014, The Nutcracker is danced the year before.

== Program one, Jan 25 - Feb 2 Full-Length ==
- Giselle

== Program two, Feb 18 - Mar 1 Mixed program ==
- Tears, an Val Caniparoli world premiere
- Borderlands
- From Foreign Lands

== Program three, Feb 20 - Mar 2 Mixed program ==
- The Kingdom of the Shades from La Bayadère, Act II
- Ghosts
- Firebird

== Program four, Mar 11 - Mar 23 Full-Length ==
- Cinderella, by Christopher Wheeldon

== Program five, Apr 2 - Apr 13 Full length ==
- Shostakovich Trilogy West Coast Premiere by Alexei Ratmansky

== Program six, Apr 4 - Apr 15 Mixed program ==
- Caprice World Premiere by Helgi Tomasson
- Maelstrom
- Possokhov's The Rite of Spring

== Program seven, Apr 29 - May 10 Mixed program ==
- Hummingbird, world premiere by Liam Scarlett
- The Fifth Season
- Suite en Blanc

== Program eight, May 1 - May 11 Mixed program ==
- Agon
- Brahms-Schoenberg Quartet
- Glass Pieces
