= Sadaise Arencibia =

Cuban ballet dancer

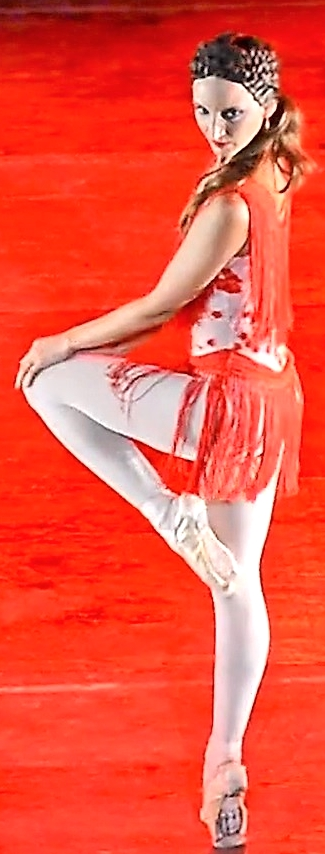
Arencibia in Carmen at the Ravello Festival in 2016

Sadaise Arencibia (born c. 1981) is a Cuban ballet dancer. In 1999, she joined the Cuban National Ballet where she has been a star dancer (primera bailarina) since 2009.

== Early life ==
After beginning her training at Havana's Alejo Carpentier Ballet School in 1991, she continued her studies at the Cuban National Ballet School under Ramona de Saá, Adria Velázquez and Mirtha Hermida. While a student, she participated in cultural exchanges with Mexico and Colombia. In 1997, she won the gold medal at the Alicia Alonso Competition in Havana and in 1998 was a finalist in the USA International Ballet Competition in Jackson, Mississippi.

== Career ==
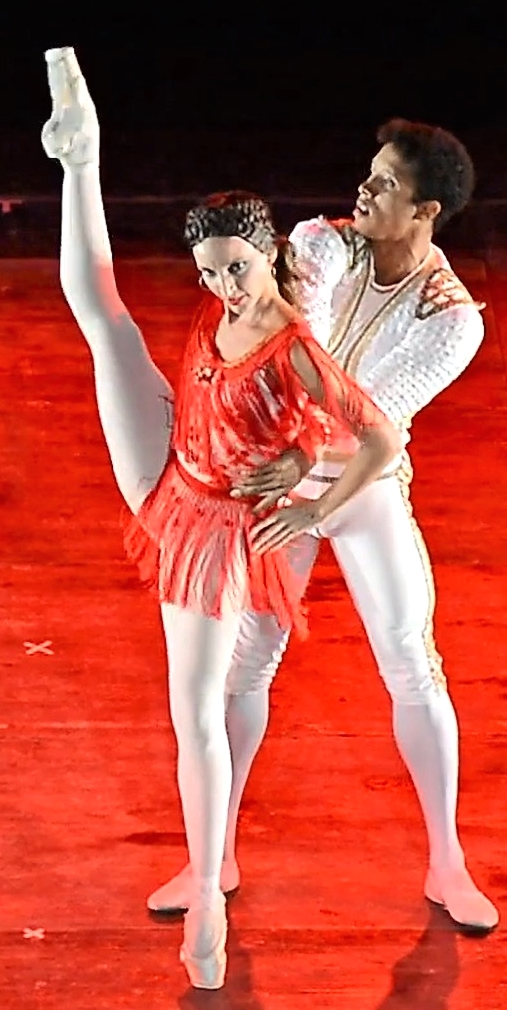
Arencibia with Luis Valle in Carmen at the Ravello Festival in 2016

In 1999, Arencibia joined the Cuban National Ballet under the artistic leadership of Alicia Alonso. In 2005 she became a principal dancer and in 2009 she was promoted to the top rank of prime dancer. She has toured with the ballet company to various locations in Europe and has performed as a guest artist at the Rome Opera Ballet (2006 and 2007) and at the Teresa Carreño Theatre (2008) in Caracas, Venezuela.

In 2010, she performed the role of Kitri at Don Quixote in the Queensland Performing Arts Centre in Brisbane, Australia. Other classical roles she particularly enjoys dancing include Odile/Odette in Swan Lake and Aurora in The Sleeping Beauty. She received considerable acclaim for both when she performed them with the Cuban National Ballet at the Sadler's Wells Theatre in 2005, one reviewer calling her "the company's technical genius". She very much likes to dance in contemporary works too.
