= Carlos Acosta =

Cuban ballet dancer

Carlos Acosta CBE
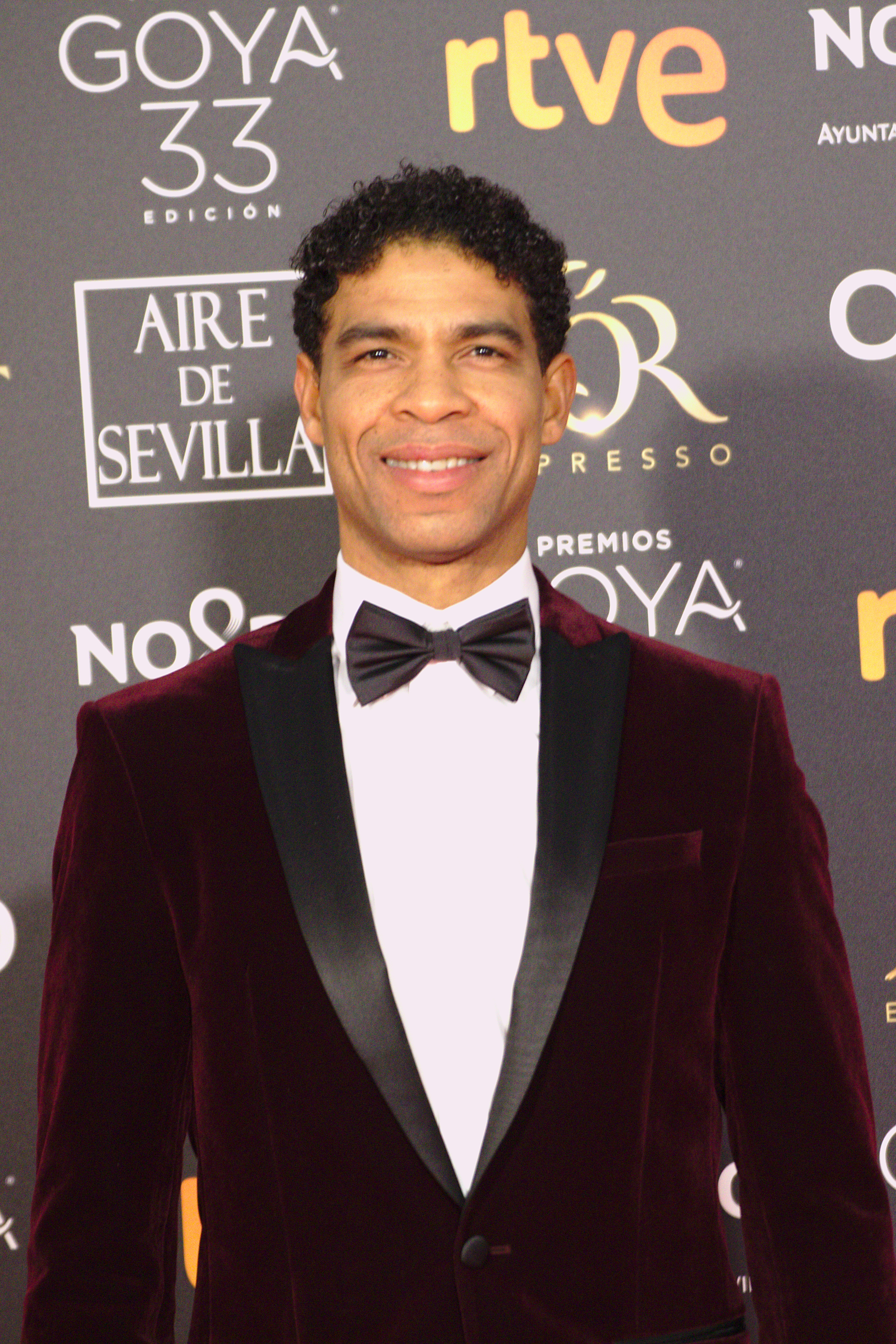
- Acosta in 2019
- Born: 2 June 1973 (age 53); Havana, Cuba
- Citizenship: Cuban (by birthplace), British
- Education: Cuban National Ballet School
- Occupation: Ballet dancer
- Dancing career
- Current group: The Royal Ballet, Director of Birmingham Royal Ballet
- Former groups: English National Ballet; National Ballet of Cuba; Houston Ballet

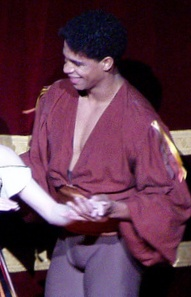
Acosta after dancing Tzigane, Royal Opera House, March 2008

Carlos Yunior Acosta Quesada CBE (born 2 June 1973) is a Cuban-British ballet director and retired dancer who is director of the Birmingham Royal Ballet. He danced with many companies, including the English National Ballet, National Ballet of Cuba, Houston Ballet and American Ballet Theatre. He was a permanent member of The Royal Ballet from 1998 to 2015. In 2003, he was promoted to principal guest artist, a rank that reduced his commitment, enabling him to concentrate on a growing schedule of international guest appearances and tours. He celebrated his farewell after 17 years at The Royal Ballet, dancing his last performance in November 2015 in Carmen, which he both choreographed and starred in.

In January 2020, Acosta was appointed as director of Birmingham Royal Ballet, succeeding David Bintley. In February, he announced the plans for his inaugural season, including a "Curated by Carlos" festival, and special performances with Alessandra Ferri.

== Early life and education ==
Acosta was born in Havana, Cuba, on 2 June 1973, the 11th and last child in an impoverished family. His father, Pedro Acosta, was a truck driver, and his mother, Dulce Maria Quesada, often suffered from health problems. Acosta grew up with no toys, sometimes went shoeless, and did not even have a birthday cake until he turned 23. The streets of his neighbourhood provided plenty of entertainment, however, and he spent his time playing football, break-dancing, and raiding nearby mango groves with his friends. He was an over-energetic child, and his father felt that his youngest son would soon land in serious trouble. Dance training at one of the state-funded schools, his father decided, would teach the boy discipline and provide him with a free lunch every day. He studied ballet at the Cuban National Ballet School with many influential teachers, including Ramona de Sáa. In June 1991 he received his diploma with maximum qualifications and a gold medal.

== Career ==
Acosta, of mixed Spanish and African heritage, came to prominence in the early 1990s while still in his teens, and North American and European dance companies began offering him lead romantic roles over the next decade. After approximately five years in Houston, Acosta joined London's Royal Ballet in 1998. With his fabled grace and athleticism, he has earned comparisons to Mikhail Baryshnikov or Rudolf Nureyev. A writer for London's Independent newspaper described Acosta as "a dancer who slashes across space faster than anyone else, who lacerates the air with shapes so clear and sharp they seem to throw off sparks".

In 2019 he was a head of the jury at the Prix de Lausanne ballet competition.

== Awards ==
- 1990 : Gold Medal at the Prix de Lausanne
- 1990 : Grand Prix at the 4th biennial Concours International de Danse de Paris
- 1990 : Vignale Danza Prize in Italy
- 1990 : Frédéric Chopin Prize, awarded by the Polish Artistic Corporation
- 1991 : Prize for Merit in the Young Talent Competition, Positano, Italy
- 1991 : Osimodanza Prize, Italy
- 1991 : Grand Prix at Cuba's prestigious Union of Writers and Artists (UNEAC) competition
- 1995 : Dance Fellowship from the Princess Grace Foundation, United States
- 2004 : Nominated for an Olivier Award
- 2008 : Prix Benois de la Danse
- 2014 : Commander of the Order of the British Empire for services to ballet
- 2023 : Prix de Lausanne Lifetime Achievement Award
- 2025 : Honorary doctorate from the University of Birmingham
- 2026 : Honorary degree from the University of Oxford

== Companies and roles ==
From 1989 to 1991, Acosta performed throughout the world, guesting with many companies, including the Compagnia Teatro Nuovo di Torino in Italy, where he danced alongside Luciana Savignano, and the Teatro Teresa Carreño in Venezuela.

=== English National Ballet ===
At the invitation of Ivan Nagy, Acosta danced with the English National Ballet in London during the 1991/92 season. He made his debut in the Polovtsian Dances from Prince Igor and also appeared in Cinderella, partnering Eva Evdokimova and Ludmila Semenyaka, Le Spectre de la Rose, Les Sylphides and as the Prince in Ben Stevenson's The Nutcracker.

=== National Ballet of Cuba ===
In 1992 and 1993, Acosta was a member of the National Ballet of Cuba under the artistic director Alicia Alonso, rising to principal dancer in 1994. In October 1993 and September 1994 he toured with the company to Madrid, where he danced various roles including Albrecht in Giselle, Basilio in Don Quixote and Siegfried in Swan Lake.

=== Houston Ballet ===
In November 1993, he was invited by Ben Stevenson, the artistic director of Houston Ballet, to join the company as a principal dancer, and Acosta made his American stage debut as the Prince in The Nutcracker. Following this, his repertory included:

- Prince Siegfried in Swan Lake,
- Solor in La Bayadère,
- Basilio in Don Quixote,
- Stevenson's Britten Pas de Deux,
- the male lead in Harald Lander's Etudes,
- Jiri Kylian's Symphony in D,
- the Chosen One in The Rite of Spring.

In 1997, he created the role of Frederick in Stevenson's Dracula and in 1998 he added the role of Misgir in the première of Stevenson's ballet The Snow Maiden, partnering Nina Ananiashvili.

=== The Royal Ballet ===
In 1998, Acosta joined The Royal Ballet, London, under the direction of Anthony Dowell. His roles with the company have included:

- William Forsythe's In the middle, somewhat elevated. This was his first appearance with the company.
- Romeo in Romeo and Juliet with Tamara Rojo in 2007 Blu-ray
- Jean de Brienne in Rudolf Nureyev's production of Raymonda Act III,
- Colas in Frederick Ashton's La fille mal gardée,
- Siegfried in Swan Lake,
- Actaeon in the Diana and Actaeon Pas de Deux,
- The Brother in Kenneth MacMillan's My Brother, My Sisters,
- Albrecht in Giselle, and
- the Principal Boy in Rhapsody,
- the Man's Solo in Petipa's Le Corsaire, at the Opening Celebration of the Royal Opera House.

In the 1999/2000 season, he performed:

- Nacho Duato's Remanso,
- The Prince in The Nutcracker,
- Solo Boy in MacMillan's Gloria,
- Franz in Ninette de Valois' production of Coppélia,
- Nijinsky's L'Après-midi d'un faune,
- Des Grieux in MacMillan's Manon,
- the Messenger of Death in Song of the Earth,
- the Boy with Matted Hair in Antony Tudor's ballet Shadowplay.

During the 2001/2 season, he made his debut as Basilio in Nureyev's Don Quixote, and in the 2002/2003 season he made his debut as the title role in George Balanchine's Apollo. He has created roles in Ashley Page's Hidden Variables and William Tuckett's 3:4.

Acosta was appointed Commander of the Order of the British Empire (CBE) in the 2014 New Year Honours for services to ballet.

=== Guest artist ===
Acosta was a guest artist with the American Ballet Theatre during the company's Metropolitan Opera House season in the summer of 2002, when he performed Prince Désiré in Sleeping Beauty Act III, Oberon in The Dream, Colas in La Fille mal gardée and Conrad in Le Corsaire. He rejoined the ABT (under artistic director Kevin McKenzie) as Principal Dancer, for the company's 2003 autumn season at New York City Center, to perform in the Tchaikovsky Pas de Deux and a new staging of Raymonda (Grand Pas Classique).

He has performed Basilio in Nureyev's version of Don Quixote, as well as Solor in Nureyev's La Bayadère, with the Paris Opera Ballet.

In recent years, Acosta has had a career as an international guest artist, appearing in the US, Russia, the Netherlands, Chile, Argentina, Greece, Japan, Italy, Germany and France. In June 2008 he guested for the first time with the Australian Ballet, in Jerome Robbins' Afternoon of a Faun, partnered by AB principal Kirsty Martin.

=== Birmingham Royal Ballet ===
In January 2020, Carlos Acosta was appointed as Director of Birmingham Royal Ballet, succeeding David Bintley. In February, he announced the plans for his inaugural season, including a "Curated by Carlos" festival, and special performances with renowned ballet dancer Alessandra Ferri.

In February, Acosta announced the plans for his inaugural 2020-2021 season. Plans included the three-week "Curated by Carlos" summer festival, which included the world premiere of Chacona, a new duet for Acosta and ballet dancer Alessandra Ferri, by Acosta Danza’s Goyo Montero.

Birmingham Royal Ballet was also scheduled to perform Carlos Acosta's Don Quixote at the Birmingham International Dance Festival in June 2020, though this was postponed due to the COVID-19 pandemic.

In February 2021, Acosta and the BRB premiered their first digital commission, a film titled "Empty Stage," scored by a song of the same name written and performed by American songwriter Benjamin Scheuer, who was accompanied by the Royal Ballet Sinfonia orchestra. The film was called "dazzling...a dance-lover's dream" by the Huffington Post.

=== Television and film performances ===
In 1997, CBS News filmed Acosta for a special report for their programme 60 Minutes (broadcast in January 1998), following him during his performances for the Houston Ballet and relaxing with friends and family in Cuba.

His television performances include two live BBC broadcasts from The Royal Opera House: the Opening Celebration in December 1999 when Acosta performed the Man's Solo in Le Corsaire, and in February 2000 the role of Franz in Ninette de Valois' Coppélia. Most recently Acosta was featured in "The Reluctant Ballet Dancer", a programme in the Imagine series shown on BBC1 on 9 July 2003 and presented by Alan Yentob. Acosta was also interviewed for the BBC's HARDtalk programme that was broadcast on Christmas Day 2003. In 2006, he was filmed in the BBC studios performing a dance from Tocororo, which was broadcast on the Newsnight programme.

On 5 February 2004, the world première of Dance Cuba: Dreams of Flight, a film by Cynthia Newport featuring Acosta and other former members of the National Ballet of Cuba, took place at the Miami International Film Festival.

Acosta also appeared as a main character in the Natalie Portman-directed segment of New York, I Love You.

Acosta's life story is told in the 2018 film Yuli: The Carlos Acosta Story, in part of which he plays his adult self; he was nominated for the Goya Award for Best New Actor for his work.

== Tocororo - A Cuban Tale ==
Tocororo is Acosta's own ballet and has been touring theatres worldwide to high acclaim.

Tocororo is the story of a young Cuban boy who leaves his family and home in the Cuban countryside to find a new life in a city. It is loosely based on Acosta's own life experiences. It is set to original music by Miguel Nuñez, which blends popular and symphonic Cuban styles and is performed live on stage by a group of five Cuban musicians.

Acosta chose the 17-strong company from dancers in Danza Contemporanea de Cuba, the Cuban National Ballet and Conjunto Folklorico Nacional de Cuba. The "young protagonist" is played by Yonah Acosta, Acosta's younger nephew, and for six performances the central role was played by José Oduardo Perez.

== Filmography ==
- 2009: New York, I Love You
- 2013: Day of the Flowers
- 2016: Our Kind of Traitor
- 2018: Yuli: The Carlos Acosta Story

== Personal life ==
Acosta is married to the English writer and former model Charlotte Holland, and they have three children.

His nephew Yonah Acosta is a dancer and actor.
