= Val Caniparoli =

American ballet dancer and choreographer

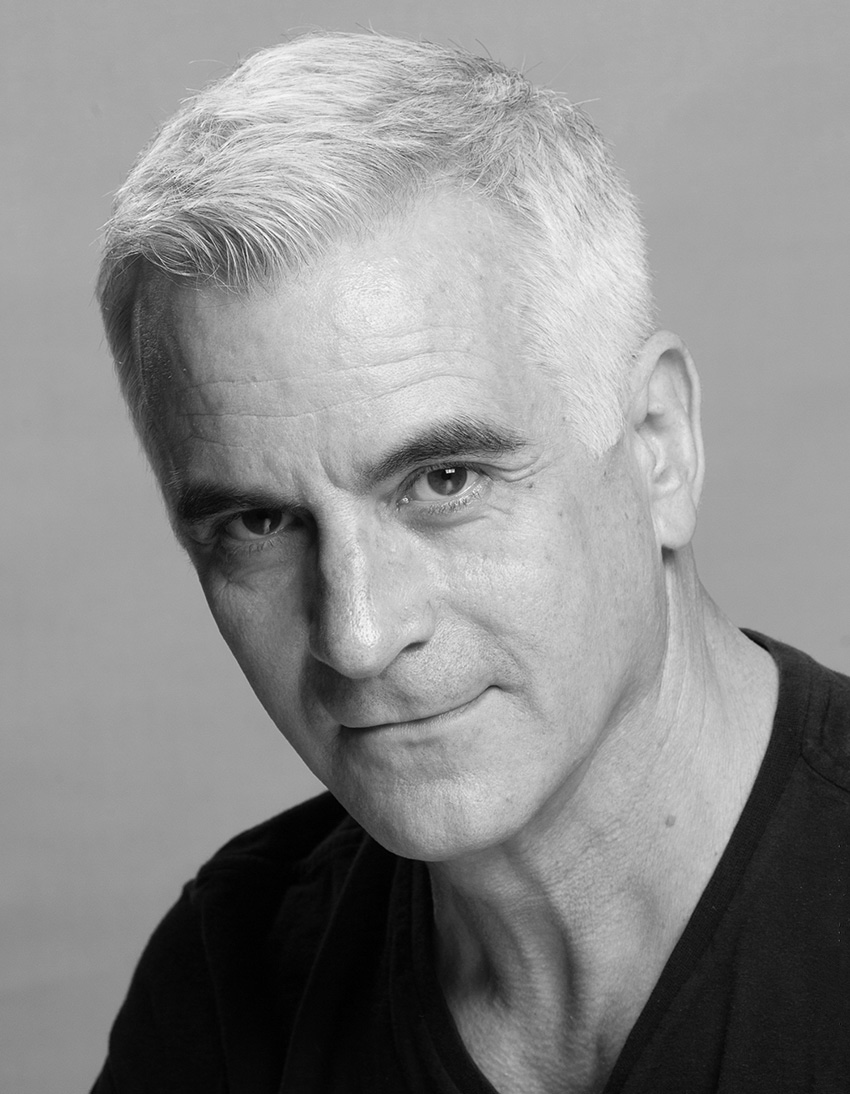
- Born: Renton, Washington, US
- Education: Washington State University
- Occupations: Choreographer, principal character dancer with San Francisco Ballet

Val Caniparoli is an American ballet dancer and international choreographer. His work includes more than 100 productions for ballet, opera, and theater for over 50 companies, and his career as a choreographer progressed globally even as he continued his professional dance career with the San Francisco Ballet.

He joined the San Francisco Ballet as a dancer in 1973. He was appointed to the position of principal character dancer with the San Francisco Ballet by artistic director Helgi Tomasson in 1987.

== Early years ==
Caniparoli was born in Renton, Washington, to Francisco Caniparoli, a clothing manufacturer, and Leonora (Marconi) Caniparoli, who worked at Boeing. He attended Washington State University (WSU), where he studied music and theater. When the First Chamber Dance Company was touring Eastern Washington, they did performances at WSU, and offered workshops in ballet. Caniparoli attended one and was told he had talent, and should audition at the San Francisco Ballet School. Thereafter, he decided to pursue a career in ballet, and left WSU. He received a scholarship from the Ford Foundation that enabled him to attend the San Francisco Ballet School. Caniparoli performed with San Francisco Opera Ballet, and in 1973, just a year and a half into his studies, he was offered a contract with San Francisco Ballet. In his debut season, he worked under Co-Artistic Directors Lew Christensen and Michael Smuin, and later, under Helgi Tomasson.

Caniparoli became interested in choreography when he attended a choreography workshop offered by the Pacific Northwest Ballet. After that work, his choreography career expanded and he was appointed resident choreographer for the San Francisco Ballet in the mid-1980s. In 1984, Caniparoli co-founded a choreographic collective called OMO in San Francisco, and a documentary about OMO's founding was broadcast that year on PBS. In 1994, he created his first full-length ballet entitled Lady of the Camellias, based on the novel by Alexandre Dumas fils, and with a score by Frédéric Chopin. Lady of the Camellias became one of Caniparoli's most popular works, and a part of the repertoire of several ballet companies, including Ballet West, Ballet Florida, Boston Ballet, Cincinnati Ballet, Tulsa Ballet, and Royal Winnipeg Ballet.

Caniparoli was resident choreographer for Ballet West from 1993 to 1997, and for Tulsa Ballet from 2001 to 2006. He continues to create works for San Francisco Ballet.

In 1995, Caniparoli choreographed a new work entitled Lambarena, set to a musical blend of Johann Sebastian Bach with traditional African music composed by Pierre Akendengue and Hughes de Courson. Lambarena has become another of Caniparoli's most popular creations, a blend of classical ballet and African dance. This ballet has been performed more than 20 companies, including Atlanta Ballet, Boston Ballet, Cincinnati Ballet, Singapore Dance Theatre, San Francisco Ballet, and State Ballet of South Africa.

In 2002, Caniparoli was invited to choreograph a pas de deux to be performed by Evelyn Hart and Rex Harrington for Queen Elizabeth II to celebrate her Golden Jubilee visit to Canada.

In May 2010, San Francisco's American Conservatory Theater (A.C.T.) premiered Tosca Cafe, a theater/dance work co-created and co-directed by Caniparoli and A.C.T.'s Carey Perloff; Caniparoli also did the choreography. "'Tosca Cafe"', which started as The Tosca Project, chronicles a wide cast of characters who inhabit Tosca, a bar in the North Beach section of San Francisco in the same location for decades. Caniparoli and Perloff saw this work as a unique opportunity for collaboration between dancers and actors. Since its 2010 premiere in San Francisco, Tosca Cafe has been performed internationally.

== Influences ==
While growing up in Renton, Washington, Caniparoli studied music for 13 years. His study included private lessons on alto saxophone, clarinet, and flute. He credits his study of music with nurturing his eclectic interest in world music and composers, and varied genres. He has become well known for his use of widely diverse music as a principal foundation for his choreographic work. He was also influenced by the dancing of film stars Gene Kelly and Fred Astaire. Caniparoli's work has been described as "rooted in classicism but influenced by all forms of movement: modern dance, ethnic dance, social dancing, even ice skating."

== Personal ==
Val Caniparoli lives in San Francisco, California.

== Ballet choreography ==
- Dr. Coppélius (Composers: Léo Delibes, Ernest Guiraud), National Ballet of Canada
- Goat Rodeo (Composers: Yo-Yo Ma, Stuart Duncan, Edgar Meyer, Chris Thile), Richmond Ballet
- Emergence (Composer: Dobrinka Tabakova) San Francisco Ballet
- What's Going On, 2022 (Composers: Marvin Gaye, Creedence Clearwater Revival, Bob Dylan, Pete Seeger, Melanie, Buffy Sainte-Marie, Jimmie Rodgers, Leonard Cohen), Richmond Ballet
- Jekyll & Hyde, 2020 (Composers: Krzysztof Penderecki, Frédéric Chopin, Henryk Górecki, Wojciech Kilar, Henryk Wieniawski), Finnish National Ballet
- Foreshadow, 2018 (Composer: Ludovico Einaudi), San Francisco Ballet
- The Nutcracker, 2018 (Composer: Pyotr Ilyich Tchaikovsky) Royal New Zealand Ballet
- If I Were A Sushi Roll, 2018 (Composer: Nico Muhly), Smuin Ballet
- Dances for Lou, 2017 (Composer: Lou Harrison), Ballet West
- 4 in the Morning, 2016 (Composer: William Walton), Amy Seiwert's Imagery
- Twisted 2, 2016 (Composer: André Previn, Jacques Offenbach, Arnold Schoenberg), BalletMet
- Repeat After Me, 2016 (Composer: Johann Paul Von Westhoff), Menlo Ballet
- Without Borders, 2016 (Composer: Yo-Yo Ma and the Silk Road Ensemble), Texas Ballet Theater
- Beautiful Dreamer, 2016 (Composer: Stephen Collins Foster), Oakland Ballet
- Stolen Moments, 2015 (Composer: Jean-Philippe, Rameau) Richmond Ballet
- Das Ballett, 2015 (Composer: Leopold Mozart), Oakland Ballet
- The Nutcracker 2014 (Composer: Pyotr Ilyich Tchaikovsky), Grand Rapids Ballet
- Twisted, 2014 (Composer: Benjamin Britten, Gioachino Rossini, Giacomo Puccini) BalletMet
- Tutto Eccetto Il Lavandino (Everything But The Kitchen Sink) 2014 (Composer: Antonio Vivaldi), Smuin Ballet
- Spaghetti Western 2014 (Composer: Ennio Morricone), Louisville Ballet
- Tears, 2014 (Composer: Steve Reich), San Francisco Ballet
- In Pieces, 2013 (Composer: Poul Ruders), Colorado Ballet
- Triptych, 2013 (Composer: John Tavener & Alexander Balanescu), Amy Siewert's Imagery
- Caprice, 2013. Premiere: Cincinnati Ballet
- The Lottery, 2012 (Composer: Robert Moran). Premiere: Ballet West
- Chant, 2012 (Composer: Lou Harrison). Premiere: Singapore Dance Theatre
- Incantations, 2012 (Composer: Alexandre Rabinovitch-Barakovsky). Premiere: Joffrey Ballet
- Swipe, 2012 (Composer: Gabriel Prokofiev). Premiere: Richmond Ballet
- Tears From Above, 2011 (Composer: Elena Kats-Chernin). Premiere: Diablo Ballet
- Double Stop, 2011 (Composer: Philip Glass), San Francisco Ballet
- Blades of Grass, 2010 (Composer: Tan Dun). Premiere: Milwaukee Ballet
- Still Life, 2010 (Composer: Elena Kats-Chernin). Premiere: Scottish Ballet
- Amor Con Fortuna, 2009 (Composer: Jordi Savali, Various). Premiere: Tulsa Ballet
- The Seasons, 2009 (Composer: Alexander Glazunov). Premiere: Pacific Northwest Ballet
- The Nutcracker, 2009 (Composer: Pyotr Ilyich Tchaikovsky). Premiere: Louisville Ballet
- Ebony Concerto, 2009 (Composer: Igor Stravinsky). Premiere: San Francisco Ballet
- Ibsen's House, 2008 (Composer: Antonín Dvořák). Premiere: San Francisco Ballet
- Suite, 2007 (Composer: George Frederic Handel). Premiere: American Repertory Ballet
- Violin, 2006 (Composer: Heinrich Ignaz Franz Biber). Premiere: Richmond Ballet
- Songs, 2005 (Composer: Chick Corea). Premiere: Central West Ballet
- Ikon of Eros, 2005 (Composer: John Tavenor). Premiere: Washington Ballet
- Sonata for Two Pianos and Percussion, 2004 (Composer: Béla Bartók). Premiere: Boston Ballet
- Val Caniparoli's A Cinderella Story, 2004 (Composer: Richard Rodgers). Premiere: Royal Winnipeg Ballet
- Gustav's Rooster, 2003 (Composer: Hoven Droven). Premiere: Tulsa Ballet
- Vivace, 2003 (Composer: Franz Schubert). Premiere: Tulsa Ballet
- Untitled, 2003 (Composer:: Dmitri Shostakovich). Premiere: Royal Winnipeg Ballet
- No Other, 2002 (Composer: Richard Rodgers). Premiere: San Francisco Ballet
- Unspoken, 2002 (Composer: Camille Saint-Saëns). Premiere: Royal Winnipeg Ballet
- Misa Criolla, 2002 (Composer: Ariel Ramirez). Premiere: Tulsa Ballet
- Devil's Sonata, 2002 (Composer: Guiseppi Tartini). Premiere: Sacramento Ballet
- boink! 2002 (Composer: Juan Garcia Esquivel). Premiere: Lawrence Pech Dance Company
- The Nutcracker, 2001 (Composer: Pyotr Ilyich Tchaikovsky). Premiere: Cincinnati Ballet
- Torque, 2001 (Composer: Michael Torke). Premiere: Pacific Northwest Ballet
- Jaybird Lounge, 2001 (Composer Uri Caine) Premiere: Pennsylvania Ballet
- Death of a Moth, 2001 (Composer: Carlos Surinach). Premiere: San Francisco Ballet
- Bird's Nest, 2000 (Composer: Charlie Parker). Premiere: Washington Ballet
- Already Dusk, 2000 (Composer: Johannes Brahms). Premiere: Lawrence Pech Dance Company
- Fade to Black, 2000 (Composer: Nina Simone). Premiere: L. Feijoo and Y. Possokhov
- Going for Baroque 1999 (Composer: Antonio Vivaldi). Premiere: Tulsa Ballet
- Attention Please, 1999 (Composer: J.S. Bach). Premiere: Richmond Ballet
- Aquilarco, 1999 (Composer: Giovanni Sollima). Premiere: San Francisco Ballet
- Separations, 1999 (Composer: Dmitri Shostakovich). Premiere: Ballet Florida
- Open Veins, 1998 (Composer: Robert Moran). Premiere: Atlanta Ballet
- Aria, 1998 (Composer: George Frederic Handel). Premiere: San Francisco Ballet
- Book of Alleged Dances, 1998 (Composer: John Adams). Premiere: Ballet West
- Slow, 1998 (Composer: Graham Fitkin). Premiere: San Francisco Ballet
- The Bridge, 1998 (Composer: Dmitri Shostakovich). Premiere: Pacific Northwest Ballet
- Djangology, 1997 (Composer: Django Reinhardt). Premiere: Richmond Ballet
- Ciao, Marcello, 1997 (Composer: Nino Rota). Premiere: San Francisco Ballet
- Prawn-watching, 1996 (Composer: Michael Nyman). Premiere: Ballet West
- Bow Out, 1995 (Composers: David Bedford and Roy Powell). Premiere: Richmond Ballet
- Lambarena, 1995 (Composer: J.S. Bach and Traditional African). Premiere: San Francisco Ballet
- La Folia, 1994 (Composer: Gregorio Paniagua). Premiere: Marin Ballet
- Tangazzo, 1994 (Composer: Amadeo Roldan). Premiere: Marin Ballet
- Lady of the Camellias, 1994 (Composer: Frédéric Chopin). Premiere: Ballet West
- Seeing Stars, 1993 (Composer: Erno Dohnanyi). Premiere: San Francisco Ballet
- Concerto Grosso, 1992 (Composer: Arcangelo Corelli). Premiere: Marin Ballet
- Pulcinella, 1991 (Composer: Igor Stravinsky). Premiere: San Francisco Ballet
- Tryst, 1991 (Composer: Wolfgang Amadeus Mozart). Premiere: Pacific Northwest Ballet
- Gran Partita, 1990 (Composer: Wolfgang Amadeus Mozart). Premiere: Pacific Northwest Ballet
- In Perpetuum, 1990 (Composer: Arvo Pärt). Premiere: San Francisco Ballet
- Ritual, 1990 (Composer: Alfred Schnittke). Premiere: Johann Renvall and Stars of American Ballet
- A Door Is Ajar, 1990 (Composer: Kronos Quartet). Premiere: Ririe Woodbury
- Between Ourselves, 1989 (Composer: Béla Bartók). Premiere: Pittsburgh Ballet Theatre
- Kinetic Impressions, 1989 (Composer: Francis Poulenc). Premiere: Ballet West
- Connotations, 1989 (Composer: Benjamin Britten). Premiere: San Francisco Ballet
- White Mourning, 1989 (Composers: Franz Schubert, Gustav Mahler). Premiere: Ballet West
- Ophelia, 1988 (Composer: Bohuslav Martinu). Premiere: Ballet West
- Narcisse, 1987 (Composer: Claude Debussy). Premiere: San Francisco Ballet
- Hamlet and Ophelia Pas de Deux, 1985 (Composer: Bohuslav Martinu). Premiere: San Francisco Ballet
- Aubade, 1985 (Composer: Francis Poulenc). Premiere: Israel Ballet
- Accidental or Abnormal Chromosomal Events, 1984 (Composer: Al Aguis-Sinerco) Premiere: Bay Area Playwrights Festival
- Tar Marmalade, 1984 (Composer: Douglas Adams). Premiere: Oakland Ballet
- Chansons de Scheherazade, 1983 (Composer: Maurice Ravel). Premiere: San Francisco Ballet
- Windows, 1983 (Composer: Ludwig van Beethoven) Premiere: San Francisco Ballet
- Loves-Lies-Bleeding, 1982 (Composer: Igor Stravinsky). Premiere: San Francisco Ballet
- Deranged Dances, 1982 (Composer: Charles Ives). Premiere: Marin Ballet
- Six-for-Eight, 1981 (Composer: George Frederic Handel). Premiere: Palo Alto Dance Theatre
- Street Songs, 1980 (Composer: Carl Orff). Premiere: Pacific Northwest Ballet
- Concertino, 1979 (Composer: Carlo Ricciotti). Premiere: Contemporary Dance Theatre of Tucson

== Theater choreography and direction ==
- The Cherry Orchard (Written by Anton Chekov, Directed by Carey Perloff), Marin Theatre
- A Little Night Music (Music and Lyrics: Stephen Sondheim), American Conservatory Theater (A.C.T.), San Francisco
- Arcadia (2013), American Conservatory Theater (A.C.T.), San Francisco
- Tosca Café (2011), Theatre Calgary, Vancouver Playhouse
- The Tosca Project (2010), American Conservatory Theater (A.C.T.), San Francisco
- Tis Pity She's a Whore (2008), A.C.T., San Francisco
- A Christmas Carol, (2005), A.C.T., San Francisco
- A Doll's House, (2003), A.C.T., San Francisco

== Opera choreography ==
- Two Women (2015) (Music by Marco Tutino) (adapted from the novel La Ciociara by Alberto Moravia), San Francisco Opera
- Andrea Chenier (1995), Lyric Opera of Chicago
- Capriccio (1990), San Francisco Opera, Metropolitan Opera, Lyric Opera of Chicago
- Manon (1986), San Francisco Opera

== Concert choreography ==
- Mlada (2003), San Francisco Symphony
- Psycho, The Ballet (1996), San Francisco Pops
- Embraceable You (1995), San Francisco Pops

== Film choreography ==
- Metropolitan Opera Live in HD, R. Strauss: Capriccio (2011)
- Great Dancers of our Time: In der Hauptrolle Vladimir Malakhov, Lucia Lacarra und Kiyoko Kimura; choreography for Lady of the Camellias (DVD, 2005)

== Television ==
In 2015, co-choreographed with Helgi Tomasson, a commercial for the 50th Anniversary Super Bowl with dancers from San Francisco Ballet.

Choreography from Lambarena featured on Sesame Street with dancers Lorena Feijoo and Lorna Feijoo.

Caniparoli appeared on PBS in The San Francisco Ballet in Cinderella Dance in America (the Great Performances Series) in the role of Cinderella's father. In addition, he appeared in three television specials:

1. The Creation of OMO (1987), in which he discussed the experimental dance company he co-founded
2. A Song for Dead Warriors (1984)
3. Romeo and Juliet, Michael Smuin's ballet production, which aired on PBS in 1976

== Honors and awards ==
- Recipient, 10 grants for choreography, National Endowment for the Arts
- Recipient, (2001) Isadora Duncan Dance Award for Choreography, Death of a Moth, San Francisco Ballet
- Nominated, (1997) Lambarena nominated for the Prix Benois de la Danse for Best Choreography.
- Recipient, (1997 & 1994) awards from the Choo-San Goh & H. Robert Magee Foundation

1997: Open Veins, Atlanta Ballet
1994: Lambarena, San Francisco Ballet

- Recipient, (1997) Isadora Duncan Award for Sustained Achievement
- Recipient, (1991–1992) Choreographers Fellowship, National Endowment for the Arts
- Recipient, (1991) Artist Fellowship, California Arts Council
- Recipient, (1991) Artist Fellowship, California Arts Council
- Recipient, (1987) Isadora Duncan Award for Aubade, Bay Area Dance Coalition
- Recipient, (1981–1988), Choreographers' Fellowship, National Endowment for the Arts
- Recipient, (1972) Ford Foundation Scholarship
