= Prodanza Ballet Academy =

The Center Prodanza of Cuba (Spanish: Centro Prodanza de Cuba) is a Cuban school of classical ballet, dance, and synchronized swimming with many different traditions and genres. The center has produced several prominent ballet dancers and has a ballet company that has toured South America and the Caribbean region.

Center Prodanza was established on December 30, 1994, by the Department of Specialized Teaching, Cuban National Ballet, under the direction of Laura Alonso. The center is located in Havana.

== Background ==
The Prodanza Center (Centro Prodanza) has approximately 464 students from ages four to 15 who are receiving technical training in ballet, acting, makeup, and fitness. The Center strives to provide a consistent training methodology to prepare dances for the teaching methodology and technique of the Cuban School of ballet. Alumni of this program include:

- José Manuel Carreño, principal dancer of American Ballet Theatre
- Xiomara Reyes, prima ballerina of American Ballet Theatre
- Arionel Vargas, solo Royal Winnipeg Ballet of Canada
- Yat-Sen Chang, first dancer of the English National Ballet

Prodanza is a tradition of conducting important annual events like the summer Cuballet, the academic year for teachers, martial arts courses and their relationship to dance, dance workshops, and academic year-round professional training courses, counting these with the participation of dancers from various countries.

== Projects ==
The Prodanza Center sponsors the following four programs:

=== Laura Alonso Ballet company ===
Founded in 1995, the company performs over 100 times per year in three theaters in Cuba. Its repertoire includes The Nutcracker, Coppelia, Don Quixote, The Corsair, Swan Lake, La Bayadere, La Fille Mal Gardee, La Sylphide, The Three Musketeers, Dracula, and Le Chevalier de Saint-Georges Yarini. The company also programs Pas de deux concerts with classical and original works by contemporary choreographers.

=== Los Pinos Nuevos school ===
Established on September 11, 1980, the school teaches folk dancing, folkloric Cuban salsa, modern dance, ballet, Jazz dance, and Hip Hop. Its students have performed nationally and internationally.

=== I play company ===
Created on September 17, 2008, the company's repertoire includes the fusion of rhythms, folk dances, contemporary dance and hip hop dance. Presented on national and international stages.

==== Blue Water Ballet Dance Company ====
Created in 1991, its repertoire is synchronized swimming technique in choreography inspired by fusion, folk, popular and contemporary. Presented in national and international stages.

== International events ==
Each summer, the Center sponsors Cuballet, a summer school for professional dancers and ballet students aged 10 and over from all countries. It offers programs for dancers and dance teachers.

The Laura Alonso Ballet Company has performed in Jamaica, Guadalupe, Brazil and Mexico. It currently holds two annual events in January in Brazil

== Areas of cultural cooperation ==
- Company artistic presentations Laura Alonso: complete ballets and concert functions.
- Cuballet realization of the international event.
- Professional and technical advice to the academies.
- Professional training of dancers and waiters in Cuba or abroad.
- Vocational training of dancers in Cuba or abroad.
- Scholarships for artistic talents in the field of ballet for professional courses in Cuba.

== Directory ==
Classic :

Nutcracker

Coppelia
Don Quixote
The Corsaire
The Swan Lake

La Bayadere
La Fille Mal Gardee
La Sylphide and the Scotsman
The Three Musketeers

Neoclassical :

Dracula
Le Chevalier de Saint-Georges
Yarini

Choreography:

Classic:

Diana and Actaeon (pas de deux)
Giselle (pas de deux)
Grand pas de quatre
Sleeping Beauty (pas de deux)
The Flames of Paris (pas de deux)
The Dying Swan (male version)
The Dying Swan (female version)
Raymonda (pas de deux)

== See also ==
- Ballet music
- History of ballet
- List of ballets by title
