= Mikko Nissinen =

Finnish ballet dancer (born 1962)

Mikko Nissinen (born 4 March 1962) is a Finnish ballet dancer. He has danced with the Dutch National Ballet and San Francisco Ballet. He is the Artistic Director of Boston Ballet, a position he has held since 2002.

== Biography ==
Born and raised in Finland, Nissinen started his training at age ten with the Finnish National Ballet School, continuing his studies at the Kirov Ballet School. His primary teachers were Jacobson, Damianov, Sokolov, and Teräsvuori. In 1978, he won First Prize at The National Ballet Competition in Kuopio, Finland. Launching his professional dance career at the age of fifteen, Nissinen went on to perform with the Dutch National Ballet, Basel Ballet and San Francisco Ballet, where he was Principal Dancer for nine years. After retiring from his performing career, he was Artistic Director for Marin Ballet and Alberta Ballet before coming to Boston.
