= Fernando Alonso (dancer) =

Cuban ballet dancer

- Born: Fernando Juan Evangelista Eugenio de Jesús Alonso Rayneri; 17 December 1914; Havana, Cuba
- Died: 27 July 2013 (aged 98); Havana, Cuba
- Occupation: Ballet
- Spouse: Alicia Alonso (m. 1937; div. 1975)
- Children: 1
- Career
- Former groups: American Ballet Theatre (1940–1948), Cuban National Ballet (1948–2013)

Fernando Alonso (17 December 1914 – 27 July 2013) was a Cuban ballet dancer. He is a co-founder of the Cuban National Ballet and was part of the American Ballet Theatre company between 1940 until 1948. He received the Prix Benois de la Danse for lifetime achievement in 2008.

== Biography ==
Born as Fernando Juan Evangelista Eugenio de Jesús Alonso Rayneri in Havana, Cuba in 1914 to Matías Alonso Reverón and Laura Rayneri Piedra. His father worked as an accountant and his mother worked at a local cultural institution, Sociedad Pro-Arte Musical, within their household the arts were valued. By 1929, at age 15 both Fernando and his younger brother Alberto were sent to the United States to study at Spring Hill College in Mobile, Alabama, due to the country's political instability.

He returned to Cuba in 1935 at the age of 21, and began his dancing career that year by enrolling in dance classes. In 1937 he married Alicia Alonso, a teenage ballet dancer. The new couple and Alonso's brother moved to New York City, hoping to begin their professional careers in the United States. In 1938, their child Laura was born.

He and Alicia joined the American Ballet Theatre in 1940, where they remained until 1948. They returned to Havana and were part of a group called the Alicia Alonso Ballet Company, where his wife co-founded her own company with him. It later became the Ballet Nacional de Cuba. He separated from Alicia in 1974. In 1975, after he and Alicia divorced. He took control of the Ballet de Camagüey in the city of Camagüey, where he remained until 1992.

In 2000, he was awarded Cuba's National Dance Prize for lifetime achievement. On 27 July 2013, Cuba's state television announced his death at the age of 98. No cause was specified, however his daughter Laura reported it was due to kidney failure.

== See also ==
- Cuban National Ballet
