= Cuban National Ballet School =

National ballet school of Cuba

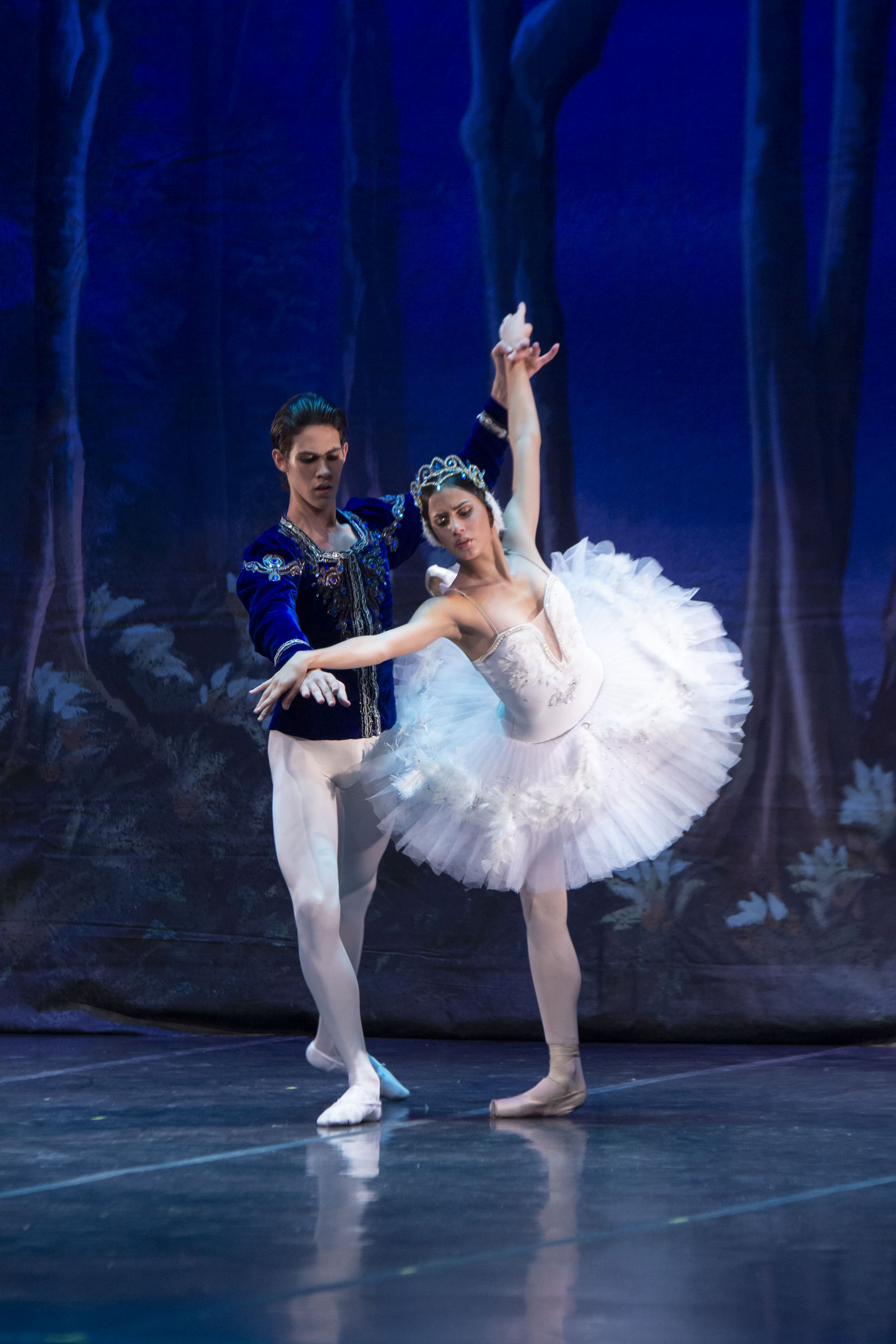
The School at a gala in Mexico City, on 2019.

The Cuban National Ballet School (Escuela Nacional Cubana de Ballet) in Havana, with approximately 3,000 students is the biggest ballet school in the world and the most prestigious ballet school in Cuba. It was directed by Ramona de Sáa until her death on 17 April 2024.

== History ==
The school dates back to the Ballet School of the Sociedad Pro-Arte Musical de La Habana, founded in 1931, where the prima ballerina assoluta, Alicia Alonso her former husband Fernando Alonso and his brother Alberto received their earliest ballet classes. In 1961, state-sponsored education began with the creation of the Alejo Carpentier Provincial School of Ballet (Escuela Nacional de Ballet Alejo Carpentier). The following year, the National School of Ballet was created as part of the National School of Art. The fundamental characteristic of this teaching institution is in its formation, sustained in the methodology of the Cuban school of ballet. Like all the Cuban educational systems, the education of the ballet in the country is free.

=== Expansion ===
The school was able to accommodate 900 students until the president Fidel Castro, who, in a visit to the school, suggested the idea of new studio space. After some proposals, he decided to raise the number of students from 900 to more than 4,000 children and adolescents. Director of the school, Ramona de Sáa recalls: "quickly we started doing the study: how many students per classroom, how many professors... and in a few days we were delivering the project to the president for the new social order of the school."

In 2002 the expansion allowed the program to begin the work to select 4,050 students out of the 52,000 that were interested. Professionals from the Cuban National Ballet, the Superior Institute of Art and the Elementary School of Ballet divided into 35 teams to select the students that would attend the school.

== Graduates ==
Many of the school's alumni are eminent professionals, recognized in Cuba and internationally. Most of them form part of the Cuban National Ballet, one of the most important companies of the world. Some are given permission to join, or defect to, foreign ballet companies, primarily American.

== Location ==
Paseo del Prado e/ Trocadero y Morro
Havana, Cuba

== See also ==
- Dance in Cuba
- History of ballet
- Prodanza Ballet Academy
