= Cuban National Ballet =

Cuban classical ballet company

General information
- Name: Cuban National Ballet
- Local name: Ballet Nacional de Cuba
- Year founded: October 28, 1948
- Founders: Alicia Alonso; Alberto Alonso; Fernando Alonso
- Principal venue: Great Theatre of Havana; 458 Paseo de Prado esquina a San Rafael; Havana; Cuba
- Website: www.balletcuba.cult.cu

Artistic staff
- Artistic Director: Viengsay Valdés
- Resident Choreographers: Iván Tenorio; Eduardo Blanco
- Artistic Staff: Ballet Masters: Loipa Araújo; Aurora Bosch; María Elena Llorente; Svetlana Ballester; Carmen Hechavarría; Ana Leyte; Félix Rodríguez; Mercedes Vergara; Consuelo Domínguez; Javier Sánchez; Régisseurs: Ocilia Pedrera; Lydia Díaz; Miguel Rodríguez; Mijaela Tesleoanu; Tamara Villareal

Other
- Associated schools: Cuban National Ballet School
- Formation: Principal; First Soloist; Soloist; Coryphee; Corps de Ballet

The Cuban National Ballet (Spanish: Ballet Nacional de Cuba) is a classical ballet company based at Great Theatre of Havana in Havana, Cuba, founded by the Cuban prima ballerina assoluta, Alicia Alonso in 1948. The official school of the company is the Cuban National Ballet School.

== History ==
The company was founded by Alicia Alonso, her husband Fernando, and Fernando's brother Alberto on October 28, 1948 as Ballet Alicia Alonso. Two years later in 1950, the Alicia Alonso Academy of Ballet school was established to promote the talents of young Cuban dancers. Both of these schools were annexed to the professional ballet company by 1956.

Prior to the Cuban Revolution the Cuban ballet thrived artistically however struggled financially. The Cuban government declined to fund it. When Fidel Castro took control of Cuba in 1959, he committed to leveling the social structure and to make the arts available to everyone. “The old government was out and the new hope was coming for the arts and the ballet in Cuba,” recalled Margarita de Saá, former BNC ballerina. The coming of the Cuban Revolution, marked the beginning of a new stage for the Cuban ballet. With state funding from Fidel Castro suddenly ballet became important to the country and its identity. That year, as a part of a new cultural program, the company was reorganized and it took the name of National Ballet of Cuba. With free funding by Fidel Castro, Cuba’s ballet program grew to unimaginable levels of practice that rivaled and in some cases surpassed several of the National Ballet programs in Europe. Significant improvements in traditional repertory, unique and diverse choreographic advances, established works that were recognized routinely as visionary achievements in Cuban contemporary choreography.

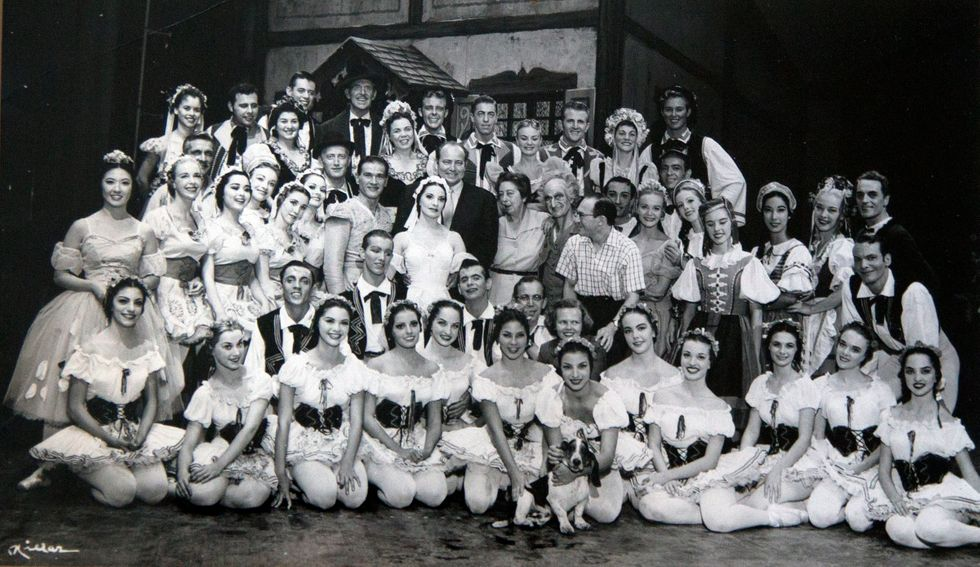
Benjamin Steinberg (conductor) and Alicia Alonso, with the Cuban National Ballet

Significant improvements in traditional repertory, unique and diverse choreographic advances, have established works that are recognized routinely as visionary achievements in the contemporary choreography. The BNC has choreographed and performed completely new versions of classics such as Giselle, The Swan Lake or Coppélia. These masterpieces are sometimes accompanied with works coming from the renovating movement of Sergei Diaghilev Russian Ballets Petrushka, or Afternoon of a Faun; and ballets created by Cuba's national choreographers.

With the revolution in 1959 and its policy to make art available to everyone, the Alonsos grasped the opportunity to set up the school by receiving funding from the government. Government funding for the Ballet Nacional continues to this day. These funds allow the Ballet to scour the country and hand pick gifted students. They set off to search all over the country to find children with aptitude whom they might teach. They travel to over 14 provinces, with the criteria that prospective students should have musicality, good body proportions, and the ability to follow simple steps. Cuba funds a country-wide teaching organization called the National School of Ballet, directed by Ramona de Saá. According to alum Lorena Feijoo, "Our training was very, very intense. We would dance from 7 a.m. to 1:30 p.m., and we would have to do character dances and French language and piano. We learned how to read music, folklore, African dances, historical dances, and salon dances. It was a very complete dance education."

The system remains the same today. Boys have been encouraged to audition as much as girls, and over the years this has become an easier task now that parents realize the financially rewarding future that awaits good dancers. During their eight-year period of training, all students receive support from the government, everything is free. After completing the training, a dancer earns approximately $30 a month, which compares to the salaries of doctors and skilled workers.

Following the classical Soviet system, the National Ballet School turns out 40 professionals a year.

The choreographic versions of the classics are known internationally, because of the many performances at major theatres. This includes theatres such as The Ballet of the Paris Opera, where Giselle was performed, and the Grand Pas de Quarte, where The Sleeping Beauty was performed. In addition, the school has performed Giselle at other major theatres including the Vienna State Opera and the San Carlos of Naples. Furthermore, performances such as La Fille Mall Gardee occurred at the Opera Prague and The Sleeping Beauty at the Teatro alla Scala of Milan.

Besides its intense activity in Cuba, the National Ballet of Cuba develops a program of international tours. These tours take the BNC to stages of different countries within Europe, Asia and America annually. Important awards, such as the Grand Prix of the Ville of Paris and the Order Félix Varela, of the Republic of Cuba, joined with frequent acclamation of specialized critics. In addition to the acclaim of the most prominent representatives of the critics and awards received by their figures, individuals have won awards in international competitions and festivals. Outstanding members of the company have consistently received distinctions and awards in competitions and international festivals. The success is known as the reflection of its founder Alicia Alonso. The company has created more than 600 works and performed in more than 60 countries worldwide.

On the occasion of its 50th anniversary Fidel Castro awarded the ballet and Alicia Alonso its highest civil decoration, the Lazaro Pena Order.

The opportunity to join foreign ballet companies is a big incentive for numbers of the National Ballet of Cuba, where a top dancer's pay is about $30 a month. Today several American and British companies have former dancers from the National Ballet dance school among their principal dancers as Lorna Feijoo and her husband Nelson Madrigal who perform with the Boston Ballet, Lorna's sister is with the San Francisco Ballet, in the San Francisco Ballet where Cuban Jorge Esquivel is one of the ballet masters. In 2004 Jose Manuel Carreno was the first Cuban to win the Dance Magazine award for contributions to ballet since the prima ballerina assoluta Alicia Alonso did in 1958.

=== Defections ===
In 2003, the Cuban National Ballet toured the United States for the first time with new dancers in the troupe and was known as a very successful tour impressing audiences with an exuberant version of Don Quixote in New York City and other cities. The lead roles were danced by Viengsay Váldes, 27, and Joél Carreno, which is Jose Manuel Carreno's brother. The American tour's brilliance was overshadowed by the defection of five lesser known dancers which two of them, Cervilio Amador and Gema Diaz, both of 20, were taken up as soloists by the Cincinnati Ballet. For Alonso, the defection of dancers who had received nine years of free training, was "painful". In 2005 two more dancers from the Ballet Nacional de Cuba defected. Octavio Martin, a principal dancer, and his wife, Yaima Franco, who ranked slightly above the corps de ballet, left after a performance at a festival in Villahermosa, Mexico, on October 30, 2005.

The most recognized figure from Cuban National Ballet to have defected in the past few years is, without question, Rolando Sarabia. Hailed by The New York Times as the 'Cuban Nijinsky'. Rolando defected in 2005, a year after his brother Daniel Sarabia, also a former dancer with Cuban National Ballet, entered the United States via Mexico. Rolando, danced as a principal with Houston Ballet and while Daniel danced with Boston Ballet, under the direction of Mikko Nissinen, later the Sarabias danced together with Miami City Ballet as Principal and Soloist, respectively.

== The ballet today ==
Through the Ballet Nacional and its network of schools, Alicia and Fernando Alonso created a uniquely Cuban-style of dance. Besides the improvement of the traditional repertoire, it fosters a strong choreographic movement with works that rank among the most significant achievements of contemporary choreography. Including some of the first dancers that attended the school, such as Ernesto Alvarez, Sadaise Arencibia, Elier Bourzac, and Joel Carreno.

Though elderly and nearly blind, Alicia Alonso remained at the helm of the Ballet Nacional, although there have been repeated requests for new leadership. After giving her last performance in 1993 at the age of 72, Prima Ballerina Alicia Alonso continued to organize the Nutcrackers with great success at the Valencia main theater, as a part of the Spanish tour. Her example, dedication and hard work continues to be the motivation forces of Cuban ballet, whose style reflects hers without slavish copying.

The development of Cuban artists has been a goal of the government under Fidel Castro, which continues to provide state support for dance education and performance. The government subsidies reflect the importance of dance in Cuban society, where social dances are a part of everyday life.

In January 2019, Alicia Alonso named dancer Viengsay Valdés as deputy artistic director of the Cuban National Ballet. As of January 2019, Alicia Alonso was still general director of the ballet, however she died that October at age 98. After Alonso's death, Viengsay Valdés became the artistic director.

== Dance department ==
Besides Cuba's National Ballet's intensive work, it develops important educational activity, targeting its dancers' artistic-technical training or improvement. The International Dance Program was created in March 1999. Directed by Alicia Alonso, its main objective is to teach students and visiting professors the methodology of the Cuban School of Ballet as well as various elements that make up the uniquely Cuban form of ballet. The courses of the International Dance Program constitute accreditation, and a "hands on" experience.

Participation includes professors and maîtres of the National Ballet of Cuba and other specialists appointed by its management. Through the BNC's International Dance Program, knowledge is manifested through special Cuban BNC techniques, idiosyncrasies, aesthetics and characteristics of Latin American culture. The Cuban dance form is an expression of the Ibero-America, Caribbean roots, and classical styles that are sustained or enhanced by common or similar ethnic and cultural antecedents. The International Dance program of the National Ballet of Cuba offers studies that cover different disciplines applicable to individuals or particular groups these often include: Ballet, En pointe, Variations, Classic Duet, Modern Dance, Outlook of the history of the dance, music appreciation, physical preparation, acting, and Make-up.

=== Courses and international workshops ===
The National Ballet provides ballet courses to international students. The International Dance Program of the National Ballet of Cuba is directed by the Prima Ballerina Assoluta Alicia Alonso. The program summons professionals and students of advanced levels of both sexes, to its unique courses on technique, style and the interpretative concepts of the Cuban School of Ballet. The duration of the courses can vary and may begin at any time of the year. Programs are structured by means of theoretical-practical classes in a basic module integrated by classes of Ballet, En pointe and physical preparation. Individual programs may be structured to qualified professionals and students at Ms. Alonso's discretion.

== See also ==
- History of ballet
- Prodanza Ballet Academy
