= Helgi Tómasson (dancer) =

Icelandic artistic director and principal choreographer

Helgi Tomasson
- Born: October 8, 1942 (age 84); Vestmannaeyjar, Kingdom of Iceland
- Education: School of American Ballet
- Known for: Ballet
- Awards: 1st International Ballet Competition (Moscow) silver medal

Helgi Tomasson (born October 8, 1942) is an Icelandic choreographer, and a former professional ballet dancer. He served as artistic director and principal choreographer for San Francisco Ballet.

== Early life ==
Tomasson was born in Vestmannaeyjar, Iceland to Tómas Bergur Snorrason and Dagmar Helgadóttir. He began his ballet training in Reykjavik with a local teacher and went on to join the National Theatre’s affiliated school, which at the time was led by Erik and Lisa Bidsted. He has a younger half brother, graphic designer Guðjón Ingi Hauksson.

== Career ==
Tomasson's professional dance career started at age 15 with the Pantomime Theatre in Copenhagen’s Tivoli Gardens. At age 17, he was discovered in his homeland by choreographer Jerome Robbins, who arranged a scholarship for Tomasson to study at the School of American Ballet' in New York City.

Tomasson went on to join the Joffrey Ballet, where he met his future wife Marlene, a fellow dancer. Two years later he joined the Harkness Ballet, staying for six years and becoming one of the company’s most celebrated principal dancers.

In 1969, at age 27, Tomasson entered the First International Ballet Competition in Moscow, representing the United States. He was allowed by Jerome Robbins to dance a solo from Robbins' Dances at a Gathering and returned with the Silver Medal; the Gold Medal was awarded to Mikhail Baryshnikov. During the course of the competition, the great ballerina Maya Plisetskaya, who was on the jury, whispered to him, "I gave you all my votes."

=== New York City Ballet ===
A year later, Tomasson joined the New York City Ballet as a principal dancer. He danced with City Ballet for 15 years, garnering worldwide recognition and performing with many of City Ballet's leading ballerinas, including Violette Verdy, Patricia McBride, and Gelsey Kirkland. Of this time, Helgi recalls "Living for so long in New York, I grew up with the best, and I was a part of that time.”

The company's founding balletmasters George Balanchine and Jerome Robbins both created roles expressly for Tomasson. Balanchine created a solo for him in Divertimento from Le Baiser de la Fée for the 1972 Stravinsky Festival. Tomasson, at age 42, performed this piece in his January 1985 farewell performance at the New York State Theater with ballerina and longtime partner Patricia McBride.

When reviewing this last performance, the New York Times wrote, “With his outstanding technique and elegance, Mr. Tomasson was the epitome of the classical male dancer. As the quintessential Robbins dancer, he knew how to filter the emotional through a crystal-clear classical prism. As the model of a Balanchine dancer, he enabled Balanchine, who had never before had dancers of Mr. Tomasson's caliber, to show off his own choreography for men at its most classical."

In 1982, with the encouragement of Balanchine, Tomasson choreographed his first ballet for the School of American Ballet Workshop, Introduction, Theme with Variations Polonnaise, Op. 65, which was very well received and elicited encouragement for him to continue choreographing. In 1983, his Ballet d'Isoline, was taken into the repertory of the New York City Ballet.

=== Artistic Director and Principal Choreographer, San Francisco Ballet ===
Following his retirement from New York City Ballet in 1985, Tomasson joined the San Francisco Ballet as artistic director. During his time with the company, he staged many full-length ballets, including Swan Lake in 1988, The Sleeping Beauty in 1990, Romeo and Juliet in 1994, Giselle in 1999, Don Quixote (in collaboration with principal dancer Yuri Possokhov) in 2003, and Nutcracker in 2004.

Tomasson’s Nutcracker is notable for being the only uniquely San Francisco Nutcracker; it is set in San Francisco during the 1915 Panama–Pacific International Exposition. Tony Award-winning designers Michael Yeargan and Martin Pakledinaz designed the sets and costumes, respectively. Upon its premiere, the New York Times called Tomasson’s Nutcracker “striking, elegant and beautiful.”

In 1995, Tomasson conceived the UNited We Dance International Festival to celebrate the 50th anniversary of the signing of the United Nations Charter. During this event, twelve ballet companies from around the world joined San Francisco Ballet to present world premiere dances over a span of two weeks.

In 2010, the Ballet’s opening night gala, Silver Celebration, honored Tomasson’s 25 years as artistic director of San Francisco Ballet.

In 2012, Helgi Tomasson was named recipient of the Dance/USA Honor, acknowledging individuals’ contributions to dance in America and the role they play in the national dance community.

In January 2021, it was announced that Tomasson would step down from the San Francisco Ballet in 2022.

== Personal life ==
Tomasson lives in San Francisco with his wife, Marlene, who was dancing with The Joffrey Ballet when they met. They have two sons. The couple own a 1-acre (4,000 m^{2}) vineyard and cottage in California’s wine country (Napa Valley), which they have renovated for ten years.

== Awards and honors ==
- 1989: Isadora Duncan Award.
- 1990: Commander of the Order of the Falcon, Iceland.
- 1991: Distinguished Citizen Award, Commonwealth Club of California.
- 1991: Golden Plate Award, American Academy of Achievement.
- 1992: Dance Magazine Award.
- 1995: Cultural Award, The American-Scandinavian Foundation.
- 1996: Honorary Doctorate of Humane Letters, “honoris causa,” Dominican College.
- 2001: Granted rank of Officier in the French Order of Arts and Letters.
- 2002: Honorary doctoral degree, Juilliard School.
- 2007: Awarded Grand Cross Star in the Order of the Falcon.
- 2012: Dance/USA Honor

== Repertory ==
=== Ballets choreographed for San Francisco Ballet ===
Tomasson is a prolific choreographer, having created more than 40 ballets for San Francisco Ballet and other leading companies around the world.

- Trio (2011)
- Swan Lake (2009)
- On a Theme of Paganini (2008)
- On Common Ground (2007)
- Blue Rose (2006)
- The Fifth Season (2006)
- Bagatelles (2005)
- Nutcracker (2004)
- 7 for Eight (2004)
- Don Quixote (2003)
- Concerto Grosso (2003)
- Chi-Lin (2002)
- Bartok Divertimento (2002)
- Chaconne for Piano and Two Dancers (1999)
- Giselle (1999)
- Silver Ladders (1998)
- Two Bits (1998)
- Twilight (1998)
- Criss-Cross (1997)
- Pandora Dance (1997)
- Soirées Musicales (1996)
- Tuning Game (1995)
- Sonata (1995)
- When We No Longer Touch (1995)
- Quartette (1994)
- Romeo & Juliet (1994)
- Nanna’s Lied (1993)
- Le Quattro Stagioni (The Four Seasons) (1992)
- Forevermore (1992)
- Two Plus Two (1992)
- Aurora Polaris (1991)
- Meistens Mozart (1991)
- “Haffner” Symphony (1991)
- The Sleeping Beauty (1990)
- Con Brio (1990)
- Valses Poeticos (1990)
- Handel—a Celebration (1989)
- Swan Lake (1988)
- Intimate Voices (1987)
- Bizet pas de deux (1987)
- Concerto in d: Poulenc (1986)
- Confidencias (1986)

=== Ballets choreographed for other companies ===
- Prism (2000), choreographed for New York City Ballet’s Spring Season
- Much Ado… (1999), choreographed for Alberta Ballet
- Ballet d’Isoline (1983), choreographed for School of American Ballet
- Giuliani: Variations on a Theme, choreographed for School of American Ballet
- Menuetto, originally choreographed for New York City Ballet, premiering during the 1984 summer session of the Saratoga Performing Arts Center
- Contredanses (1984), choreographed for Finis Jhung’s Chamber Ballet USA
- Beads of Memory (1985), originally choreographed for Houston Ballet
