= Alicia Alonso =

Cuban ballerina (1920–2019)

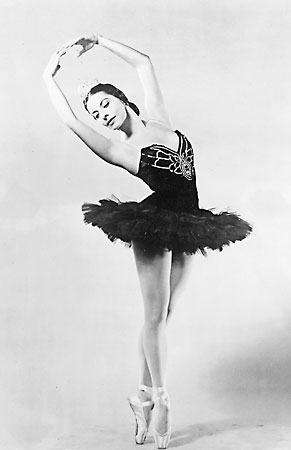
- Alicia Alonso in 1955
- Born: Alicia Ernestina de la Caridad del Cobre Martínez del Hoyo; 21 December 1920; Havana, Cuba
- Died: 17 October 2019 (aged 98); Havana, Cuba
- Occupation: Ballet dancer
- Spouses: Fernando Alonso (m. 1937; div. 1975) Pedro Simón Martínez (m. 1975)
- Children: Laura Alonso

Alicia Alonso (born Alicia Ernestina de la Caridad del Cobre Martínez del Hoyo; 21 December 1920 – 17 October 2019) was a Cuban prima ballerina assoluta and choreographer whose company became the Ballet Nacional de Cuba in 1955. She is best known for her portrayals of Giselle and the ballet version of Carmen.

From the age of nineteen, Alonso was afflicted with an eye condition and became partially blind. Her partners always had to be in the exact place she expected them to be, and she used lights in different parts of the stage to guide herself.

== Early life ==
Alonso was born "on the outskirts" of Havana in 1920, the fourth child of Antonio Martínez de la Maza Arredondo, lieutenant veterinarian of the army, and Ernestina del Hoyo y Lugo, a dressmaker. Her parents were of primarily northern Spanish descent on both sides. Alonso began dancing as a child. At the age of nine in 1929, the family moved to Spain where Alonso stayed for a year and half, there she studied and learnt typical Spanish dances, such as the Jota, Malagueñas and Sevillanas among others. In June 1931 returning to Cuba she began studying ballet at Sociedad Pro-Arte Musical in Havana with Nikolai Yavorsky.

She performed publicly for the first time on 29 December 1931, aged 11. Her first serious debut was in Tchaikovsky's Sleeping Beauty at the Teatro Auditorium on 26 October 1932. Early in her career in Cuba, she danced under the name of Alicia Martínez.

Progress in her lessons came to an abrupt halt in 1937 when Alonso fell in love with a fellow ballet student, Fernando Alonso, whom she married at age 16. The couple moved to New York City, hoping to begin their professional careers. There they found a home with relatives on the Upper West Side of Manhattan, near Riverside Drive. She gave birth to a daughter, Laura, in 1938, but continued her training at the School of American Ballet. In 1938, she made her debut in the U.S., performing in the musical comedies Great Lady and Stars In Your Eyes.

She arranged to travel to London to study with Vera Volkova.

== Vision problems ==
After seeing the doctor for worsening vision problems, Alonso was diagnosed in 1941 with a detached retina and had surgery to correct the problem. Following the operation, she was ordered to have bed rest for 3 months so her eyes could completely heal. Unable to comply fully, Alonso practiced with her feet, pointing and stretching to "keep my feet alive", as she put it. When the bandages came off, she discovered the operation had not been completely successful. After a second surgery was performed, doctors concluded Alonso would never have peripheral vision. She consented to a third procedure in Havana but this time was ordered to have bed rest for an entire year. Her husband sat with her every day, using their fingers to teach her the great dancing roles of classical ballet. She recalled, "I danced in my mind. Blinded, motionless, flat on my back, I taught myself to dance Giselle."

Finally allowed to leave her bed, dancing could still not be considered. Against doctor's orders, she went to the ballet studio down the street every day to practice. Just as her hope was returning, Alonso was injured when a hurricane shattered a door in her home, spraying glass splinters onto her head and face. Her eyes were not injured. When her doctor saw this, he cleared Alonso to begin dancing, figuring if she could survive an explosion of glass, dancing could do no harm.

== Back to work ==
Alonso traveled back to New York City in 1943 to begin rebuilding her skills. However, before she had barely settled, out of the blue she was asked to dance Giselle to replace the Ballet Theatre's injured prima ballerina Alicia Markova. Alonso accepted and gave such a performance that the critics immediately declared her a star. "Her vision difficulties helped inspire her interpretation of the role," wrote Barbara Steinberg, daughter of Benjamin Steinberg, Music Director of the Ballet Nacional de Cuba from 1959-1963, in Dance Magazine.

She was promoted to principal dancer of the company in 1946 and danced the role of Giselle until 1948, also performing in Swan Lake, Antony Tudor's Undertow (1943), Balanchine's Theme and Variations (1947), and in such world premieres as deMille's dramatic ballet Fall River Legend (1948), in which she starred as the Accused. By this time in her career, she had developed a reputation as a dramatic dancer, as well as a pure technician and a skilled interpreter of classical and romantic repertories.

The Ballet Theatre's Igor Youskevitch, her other partners, and Benjamin Steinberg quickly became expert at helping Alonso conceal her handicap. To compensate for only partial sight in one eye and no peripheral vision, the ballerina trained her partners to be exactly where she needed them without exception. She also had the set designers install strong spotlights in different colors to serve as guides for her movements.

She knew, for instance, that if she stepped into the glow of the spotlights near the front of the stage, she was getting too close to the orchestra pit. There was also a thin wire stretched across the edge of the stage at waist height as another marker for her, but in general she danced within the encircling arms of her partners and was led by them from point to point. Audiences were reportedly never the wiser as they watched her dance.

=== Alicia Alonso Ballet Company ===
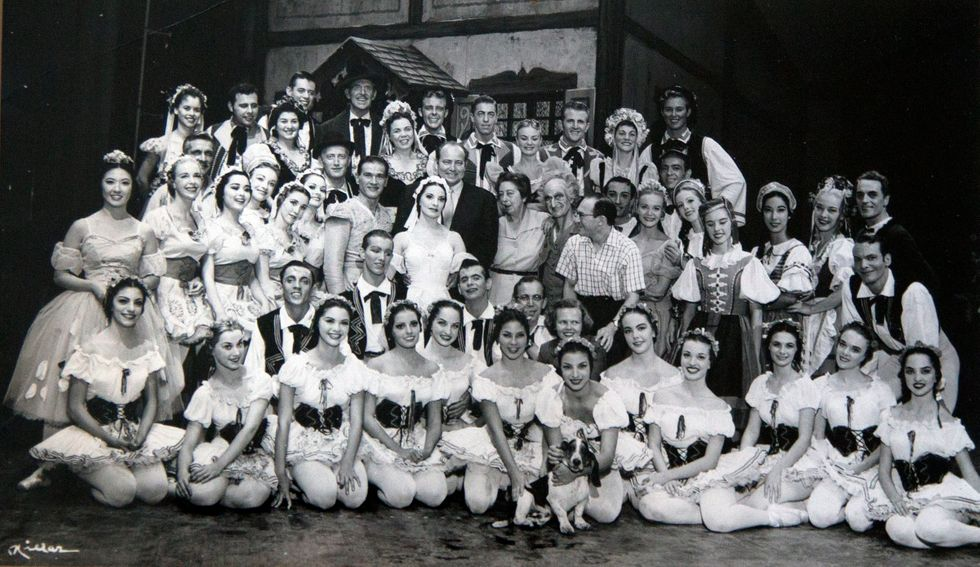
Alicia Alonso and Benjamin Steinberg (conductor) with the Ballet Nacional de Cuba

Alonso's desire to develop ballet in Cuba led her to return to Havana in 1948 to found her own company, the Alicia Alonso Ballet Company, supported largely through her fame and earnings. This company eventually became Ballet Nacional de Cuba. Fernando was general director of the company, which was at that time composed mainly of Ballet Theater dancers temporarily out of work due to a reorganization in the New York company. Fernando's brother Alberto, a choreographer, served as artistic director for the company The company debuted briefly in the capital and then departed for a tour of South America. While Alonso was happy with the success of the company, she wanted to showcase more Cuban dancers than non-Cuban dancers, leading her to open a ballet academy in Havana.

Alonso ruled the company with an authoritarian hand. Into her 60s she limited careers of younger dancers whom she regarded as competition to her own dancing career. Combined with the lack of opportunities in Cuba, her behavior led many talented dancers to defect. Founder of the International Ballet Festival of Miami and Cuban Classical Ballet of Miami, Pedro Pablo Peña, had since arriving in Miami in 1980 as a Cuban exile himself, helped numerous defecting Cuban dancers. He said of Alonso's impact:

Alicia Alonso’s work as director of the Ballet Nacional and as prima ballerina put the company on an international level. There is no doubt that she had the greatest dedication. Nothing mattered to her but ballet. But her ego turned her into a tyrant.

Exalted in the ballet world broadly, Cuban exiles reviled her, seeing her as the "cultural equivalent" to Fidel Castro.

She commuted between Havana and New York to recruit teachers to train her new students. She remained a sought-after prima ballerina during this time, dancing twice in Russia in 1952 and then producing and starring in Giselle for the Paris Opéra Ballet in 1953.

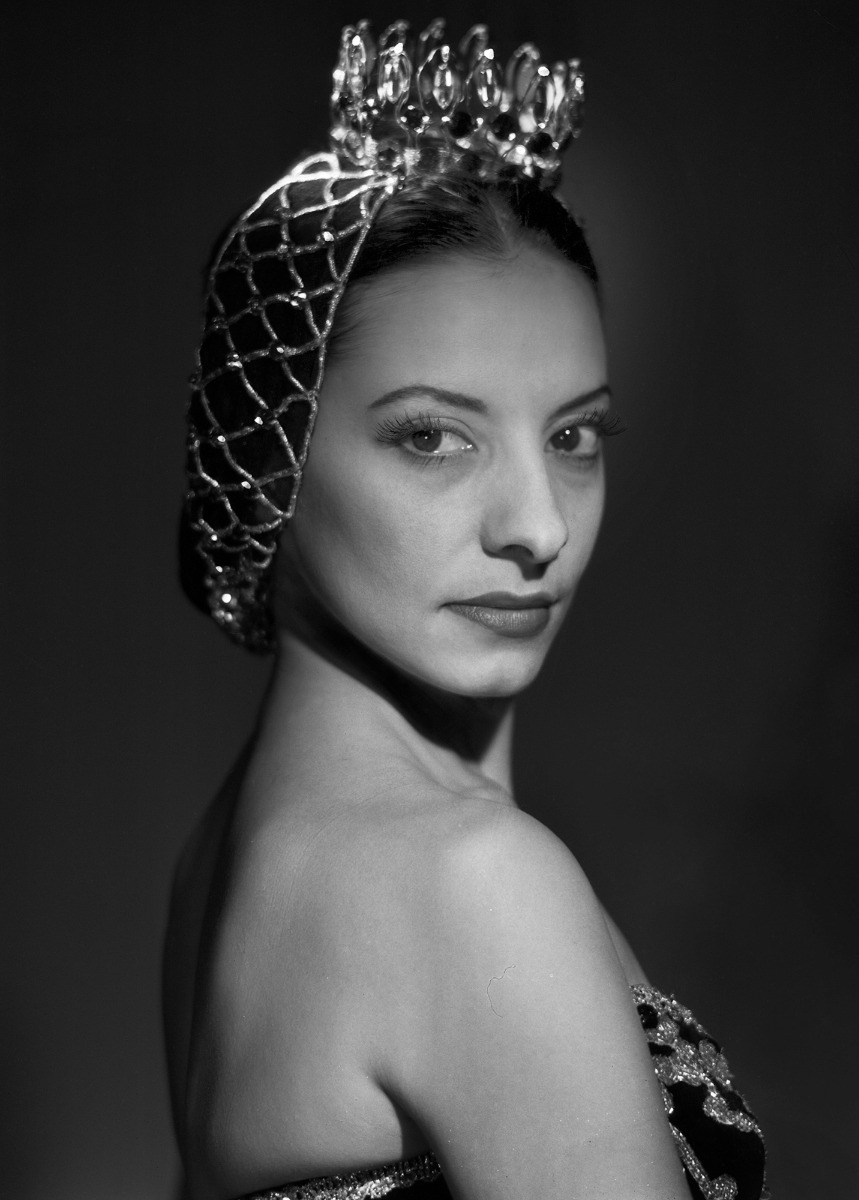
Portrait of Alicia Alonso by Annemarie Heinrich, 1958.

From 1955 to 1959, she danced annually with the Ballet Russe de Monte Carlo as guest star. She was the first dancer of the Western Hemisphere to perform in the Soviet Union, and the first American representative to dance with the Bolshoi and Kirov Theaters of Moscow and Leningrad respectively in 1957 and 1958. During the decades to follow Alicia Alonso had cross-world tours through West and East European countries, Asia, North and South America, and she danced as guest star with the Opera de Paris, the Royal Danish Ballet, the Bolshoi and with other companies.

She staged versions of Giselle, Pas de Quatre, and Sleeping Beauty for the Paris Opera. She staged Giselle at the Vienna State Opera and the San Carlo Theater of Naples, Italy, as well as La Fille Mal Gardée at the Prague State Opera, and Sleeping Beauty at La Scala.

=== Ballet Russe ===
Alonso worked with the Ballet Russe until 1959, during which time she performed in a 10-week tour of the Soviet Union, dancing in Giselle, the Leningrad Opera Ballet's Path of Thunder, and other pieces. Her performances earned her the coveted Dance Magazine Award in 1958.

== Return to Cuba ==
When Fidel Castro took power from the Batista government on 1 January 1959, Castro vowed to increase funding to the nation's languishing cultural programs. Alonso returned to Cuba and in March 1959 received $200,000 in funding to form a new dance school, the Ballet Nacional de Cuba, along with a guarantee of annual financial support.

Alonso has since described receiving a message from Castro in 1958 sent from the Sierra Maestra inviting her to head the company upon the triumph of the July 26 Movement. Alonso officially founded the school in 1960, and within several years her dancers were winning international dance competitions.

The Cuban government from the 1960s through the 1980s did not allow Cubans to perform in the United States, to some extent for fear of defectors, and monitored those with contacts outside Cuba via phone cables and letters. Her company continued to build its powers and achievements in both Eastern and Western Europe. In 1967 and 1971 she performed in Canada, where reviewers noted that Alonso was still the greatest ballerina of her time. Castro permitted Alonso to perform again in the United States in 1975 and 1976.

== Legacy ==
Alonso danced solos in Europe and elsewhere well into her 70s. She continued to serve as the director of the Ballet Nacional de Cuba, and is quoted as saying, she will remain "in charge of the ballet until after she is dead". As director and leading dancer of the Ballet Nacional de Cuba, she taught many now notable dancers in Cuba and beyond. Some of her former students have danced or dance with the American Ballet Theatre, the Boston Ballet, the San Francisco Ballet, the Washington Ballet, the Cincinnati Ballet and the Royal Ballet, among others.

Numerous books have been written on the ballerina, including Alicia Alonso: At Home and Abroad (1970), Alicia Alonso: The Story of a Ballerina (1979), Alicia Alonso: A Passionate Life of Dance (1984) and Alicia Alonso: First Lady of the Ballet (1993). The 2015 documentary film Horizontes features her life, as well as that of a middle-aged and a young dancer in Cuba.

== Personal life and death ==
Alonso's sister, Blanca María "Cuca" Martínez del Hoyo, was born in 1918. Her brothers were named Elizardo and Antonio. She married Fernando Alonso in 1937, when she was 16. They had a daughter, Laura Alonso, who danced and taught with the National Ballet. Her first marriage ended in divorce in 1975, and Alonso married editor and dance critic Pedro Simón Martínez that same year.

She died at Centro de Investigaciones Médico Quirúrgicas in Havana, Cuba, on 17 October 2019 from a health complication at the age of 98. She is survived by her second husband and her daughter, a grandson, Ivan Monreal-Alonso, who is a dancer and choreographer, and three great-granddaughters. Fernando Alonso died in 2013.

Following Alonso's death, she was remembered as "dramatic, passionate and elegiac" in a tribute by Barbara Steinberg for Dance Magazine. Her funerals were held at the Gran Teatro de La Habana named after her. Alicia Alonso was buried at Colón Cemetery in Havana.

== Awards ==
- 1958 – Dance Magazine Annual Award
- 1966 – Grand Prix de la Ville de Paris for her role in the ballet, Giselle.
- 1966 – Anna Pavlova Award of the University of Dance, Paris,
- 1970 – Grand Prix de la Ville de Paris, together with her company
- 1974 – Order of Work of the Democratic Republic of Vietnam
- 1985 – Gold Medal of the Gran Teatro by Premio Gran Teatro de La Habana
- 1998 – National Prize for Dance from the Ministry of Culture of Cuba
- 1998 – Gold medal from the Circulo de Bellas Artes of Madrid
- 1999 – UNESCO Pablo Picasso Medal for her extraordinary contribution to dance
- 1999 – Grand Prix de la Ville de Paris
- 2000 – Prix Benois de la Danse for lifetime achievement

== Honors and distinctions ==
- 1973 – Honorary doctorate in art from the University of Havana
- 1980 – Received an international homage in Paris, organized by UNESCO
- 1981 – Council of State of the Republic of Cuba gave her the Order Felix Varela
- 1987 – Honorary doctorate in dancing art from the Superior Institute of Arts of Cuba
- 1993 – Received the Commendation of Isabel Catholic Order, given by the King of Spain Juan Carlos I
- 1996 – Public recognition was given in her honor at the Scientific, Artistic, and Literary Ateneo of Madrid for her valuable artistic and cultural creations
- 1997 – The Ballet Nacional de Cuba honored Alicia Alonso on the 50th anniversary of Theme & Variations, a ballet created by George Balanchine for her and Igor Youskevitch
- 1998 – Honorary degree from the Technical University of Valencia (Universidad Politecnica of Valencia)
- 1998 – Art & Letters Order, Commander Degree, from the Ministry of Culture and Communication of France
- 2000 – Prix Benois de la Danse for lifetime achievement
- 2000 – Order of José Marti by the Council of State of the Republic of Cuba
- Received the highest official awards from the countries of Mexico, the Dominican Republic, and Panama: the Order of the Aztec Eagle (Order Aguila Azteca), the Order Duarte, Sanchez, and Mella, and the Order Vasco Nunez de Balboa, respectively
- Named National Hero of Labor in Cuba
- 2011 – Honorary Citizen of Mérida (México) and Messenger of Peace
- 2017 – Honorary doctorate from the University of Costa Rica

== Memberships ==
- Holds membership in the Advisory Council to the Ministry of Culture in the National Committee of Writers and Artists Union of Cuba
- Holds membership in the Collaborating Council of the Governing Boards of the Federation of Cuban Women

== See also ==
- List of Cubans
