= Cirio (surname) =

Cirio (pronounced [ˈtʃiːrjo]) is an Italian surname from Piedmont and Liguria, derived from a medieval given name. Notable people with the name include:

- Alberto Cirio (born 1972), Italian politician and MEP
- Armando Círio (1916–2014), Brazilian Roman Catholic bishop
- Cirio H. Santiago (1936–2008), Filipino film producer, director and writer
- Francesco Cirio (1836–1900), Italian businessman
- Jeffrey Cirio (born 1991), American ballet dancer
- Jésica Cirio (born 1985), Argentine model and dancer
- Lia Cirio, American ballet dancer
- Paolo Cirio (born 1979), Italian conceptual artist, hacktivist and cultural critic
- Sergio Cirio (born 1985), Spanish former footballer

== See also ==
- Cerio (surname)
