= Isaac Hernández =

Mexican ballet dancer and actor (born 1990)

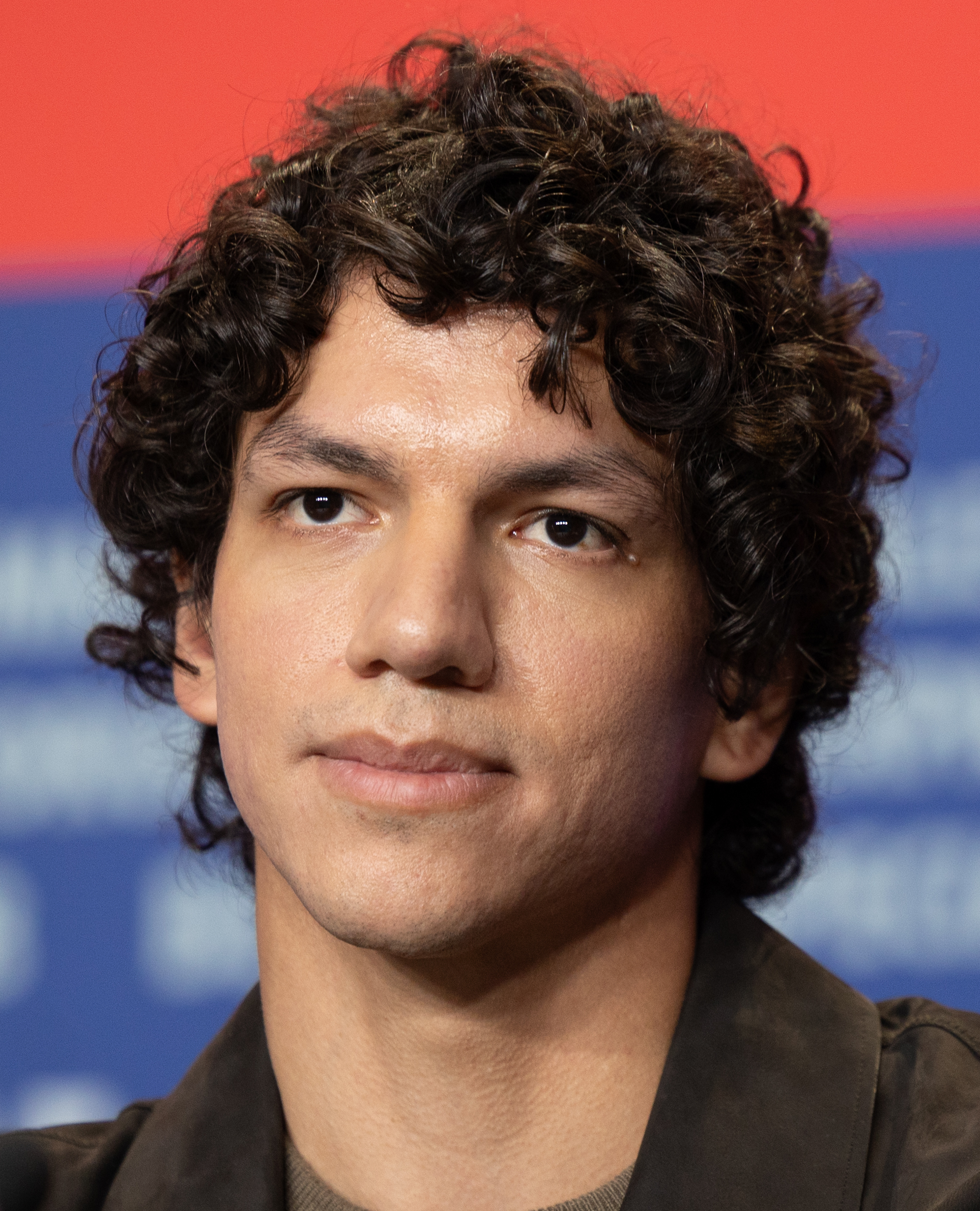
- Hernández in 2025
- Born: Isaac Eleazar Hernández Fernández; 30 April 1990 (age 36); Guadalajara, Mexico
- Education: The Rock School for Dance Education
- Occupations: Ballet dancer; actor
- Years active: 2007-present
- Children: 1
- Dancing career
- Current group: American Ballet Theatre
- Former groups: San Francisco Ballet; Dutch National Ballet; English National Ballet

Isaac Eleazar Hernández Fernández (born 30 April 1990) is a Mexican ballet dancer and actor. He trained at The Rock School for Dance Education. After working with the San Francisco Ballet, Dutch National Ballet, and English National Ballet, he has served as a principal dancer at the American Ballet Theatre since 2025. As an actor, he has starred in the films The King of All the World (2021) and Dreams (2025).

== Early life ==
Isaac Hernández was born in Guadalajara, Mexico, to Laura and Héctor Hernández, both former dancers. Héctor trained at the Harkness Ballet and performed with Dance Theatre of Harlem and Houston Ballet.

Isaac is the seventh oldest of the Hernández's eleven children. The family was very active in Guadalajara's Jewish community. At age 8, Isaac began learning ballet from his parents on a makeshift barre in the family backyard. At age 13, he moved from Guadalajara to train at Philadelphia's The Rock School for Dance Education.

== Career ==
=== Dance ===
From 2003-2007, Hernández was a National Training Scholar at ABT Summer Intensives, and danced with ABT II from 2007-2008.

In 2008, he joined San Francisco Ballet's corps de ballet and was promoted to soloist in 2010. He joined the Dutch National Ballet as a soloist in 2012, and was promoted to principal dancer the following year after dancing the role of Prince Désiré in The Sleeping Beauty. After making a guest appearance in Swan Lake with the English National Ballet, he joined the company as a lead principal in 2015. His repertoire there also includes classical works such as Romeo and Juliet and La Sylphide, as well as contemporary works including Aszure Barton’s Fantastic Beings and Akram Khan's Giselle.

In 2018, Hernandez won the Prix Benois de la Danse for his performances in Mikhail Baryshnikov and Laurent Hilaire’s Don Quixote at the Rome Opera and in La Sylphide with the English National Ballet. He is the first Mexican dancer to win the Prix Benois de la Danse award, the "Oscar of ballet."

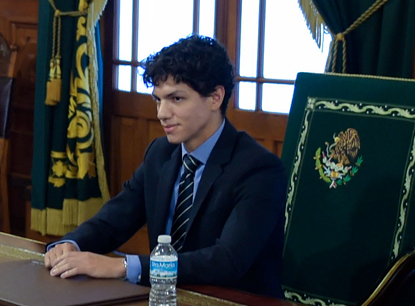
Hernández in 2018

In 2022, Hernández joined the San Francisco Ballet as a principal dancer. In July 2024, he resigned from the San Francisco Ballet and joined the American Ballet Theatre as a guest artist. For ABT's fall season, Hernández had featured roles in Études and Kingdom of the Shades.

In January 2025, Hernández became one of American Ballet Theatre's principal dancers, the first dancer of Mexican ancestry to achieve this title in the ballet company's 85-year history.

==== Select repertoire ====
Hernández's repertoire includes:

- Prince Siegfried in Swan Lake
- Ali and Conrad in Le Corsaire
- Romeo in Nureyev’s Romeo & Juliet
- Franz in Ronald Hynd’s Coppélia
- The Nephew/Prince in Eagling’s The Nutcracker
- Fantastic Beings
- Solor in La Bayadère
- Basilio in Nureyev's Don Quixote
- Basilio in Baryshnikov and Hilare’s Don Quixote
- Albrecht in Mary Skeaping’s Giselle
- The Man in Song of the Earth
- James in La Sylphide
- Prince Désiré in Sleeping Beauty
- Des Grieux in Manon
- Prince Guillaume in Wheeldon’s Cinderella
- Etudes
- Jean de Brienne in Raymonda
- Symphony in C
- Onegin
- The Dream
- Symphonic Variations
- Romeo and Mercutio in van Dantzig's Romeo and Juliet
- Chroma

==== Originated roles ====
- Prometheus in Mere Mortals, San Francisco Ballet
- Albrecht in Akram Khan’s Giselle

=== Acting ===
Hernández had his acting debut in Carlos Saura's movie The King of All the World. He then acted in Manolo Caro's limited series for Netflix Someone Has To Die in the role of Lázaro, a ballet dancer. The series premiered on 16 October 2020. He also acted opposite Jessica Chastain in the Michel Franco film Dreams.

== Awards and honors ==
Hernández is an arts and tourism ambassador of Mexico and the youngest artist to receive an outstanding artist award from the Mexican president. Hernandez and his brother Esteban set up a project in their hometown of Guadalajara to bring other dancers to perform and teach at workshops.

- 2018 Benois de la Danse at the Bolshoi Theatre
- Alexandra Radius Award for Most Outstanding Dancer
- Gold Medal, USA International Ballet Competition
- Bronze Medal and special award, Kirov Ballet at Moscow’s International Ballet Competition
- First place in the Cuba International Competition

== Personal life ==
Hernández's brother, Esteban Hernández is a principal dancer with the San Francisco Ballet. Hernández and Tamara Rojo announced their engagement in 2018. The couple have a son, born in 2021. They have since separated.
