= E. Virginia Williams =

Dance choreographer and company founder

- Born: March 12, 1914; Salem, Massachusetts, U.S.
- Died: May 8, 1984 (aged 70); Malden, Massachusetts
- Occupation: Choreographer
- Known for: American professional ballet choreographer, teacher, and founder of the New England Civic Ballet which became the Boston Ballet, the first professional ballet company in New England.
- Spouse(s): Herbert Hobbs; Carl Nelson
- Children: Carla Davis
- Awards: Dance Magazine Award -1976

E. Virginia Williams (March 12, 1914 – May 8, 1984) was an American professional ballet choreographer, teacher, and founder of the New England Civic Ballet which became the Boston Ballet, the first professional ballet company in New England.

== Early life ==
Born Ellen Virginia Williams in 1914 in Salem, Massachusetts, E. Virginia Williams spent her childhood in Melrose, MA. Her father is a descendant of Roger Williams, founder of Rhode Island, and her mother descended from settlers who landed on the boat after the Mayflower.

To aid Williams in overcoming her shyness at a young age, her parents sent Williams to her first dance lesson at the age of 5. Williams trained in many styles of dance, from ballet to modern, interpretive dance, and mime. She danced briefly with the Boston Opera company, however her father objected to her performing and Williams switched to teaching dance instead.

== Teaching ==
Williams began teaching ballet at the age of 16, and opened studios across Massachusetts including the Boston School of Ballet.

Williams cited a reason for founding her ballet companies as wanting her greater Boston area students to be able to find jobs without having to move out of the area.

In 1958 she founded the New England Civic Ballet. George Balanchine saw early company performances and acted as an artistic advisor to the company, recommending the company for a Ford Foundation grant that resulted with the founding of the Boston Ballet in 1963, the first professional ballet company in New England.

== Boston Ballet ==
Williams undertook many roles after founding the Boston Ballet company, from teaching classes to choreographing performances, sewing costumes, and taking tickets on show dates.

The first Boston Ballet performance was June 29, 1964, at the Boston Arts Festival, an arts festival held in the Boston Public Garden.

The Boston Ballet Company held their first season in 1965 with 20 dancers and approximately 30 musicians from the Boston Symphony. Williams stressed contemporary composers and choreographers in the inaugural season.

The second season in 1965-66 brought the first performance of The Nutcracker.

Williams won the Dance Magazine Award in 1976, along with contemporaries Suzanne Farrell and Michael Bennett.

Williams transferred directorship of the Boston Ballet to Violette Verdy in 1982. Williams served as an artistic advisor to the company while Verdy directed the company.

== Legacy ==
After Williams’ death on May 8, 1984, the Boston Ballet dedicated the May 17, 1984, World Premiere performance of Choo-San Goh’s Romeo and Juliet to her.

The 25th anniversary celebration of the Boston Ballet company on March 11, 1989, honored Williams.

Boston Ballet continues to honor female choreographers with their ChoreograpHER Initiative, a multiyear program established in 2018 to develop women as choreographers.
