= The Rock School for Dance Education =

Location
- 1101 S. Broad St. Philadelphia 19147; United States; 39.937636°N 75.166565°W

Information
- Type: Ballet school
- Established: 1963
- Director: Peter Stark
- Website: TheRockSchool.org

The Rock School for Dance Education is a classical ballet school headquartered in Philadelphia, Pennsylvania. As of 2019, The Rock School is led by President and Director Peter Stark. Stark was the director of Orlando Ballet School and head of the men's division for Boston Ballet School. The Rock School expanded to include a satellite campus in West Chester, Pennsylvania.

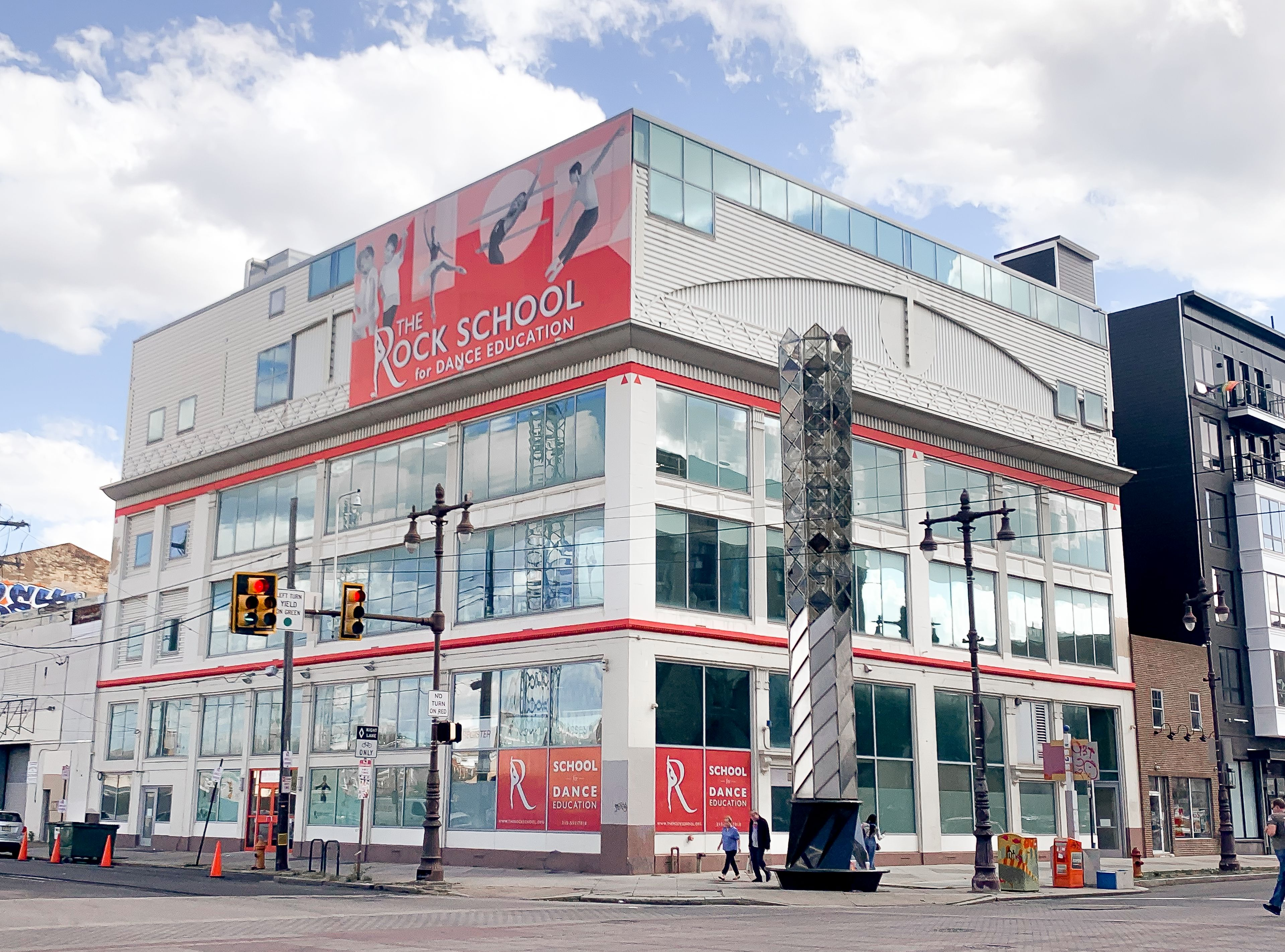
Rock School for Dance Education, 1101 S. Broad St., Philadelphia, Pennsylvania

== History ==
At the urging of New York City Ballet Artistic Director George Balanchine, Barbara Weisberger founded the School of Pennsylvania Ballet in 1962 to develop a pipeline of young dancers that could potentially join the company's corps of dancers. The School went through a series of directors throughout the 1970s and 1980s before Bojan and Stephanie Spassoff began their tenure in 1986, becoming the longest-tenured directors in the School's history, serving until 2021.

In 1992, the School of Pennsylvania Ballet became an independent organization from Pennsylvania Ballet, though they maintained a close working relationship. The School's independence was accompanied by the development of a Board of Trustees, led by Chairman Constance W. Benoliel, as well as the ownership of their school building on 1101 South Broad Street.

The Rock School began developing educational outreach activities and a scholarship program to further engage the Philadelphia community. In 2011, the ballet documentary, First Position, followed Rock School Alum Michaela DePrince as she trained for and competed at Youth America Grand Prix.

After over thirty years leading the Rock School, Bo Spassoff retired, and in February 2022, Peter Stark became the President and Director of the Rock School for Dance Education. Before joining the Rock School, Peter Stark was the associate director of Boston Ballet II and head of the Men’s Program for Boston Ballet School. He also served as Director of the Orlando Ballet School and founded the company Next Generation Ballet in Tampa, Florida.

== Programs ==
The Rock School for Dance is a boarding school, with many students living on campus while receiving dance training. The Rock School has had students from over twenty countries and forty-four states enrolled in the Professional Division. For students under the age of twelve, The Rock School offers ballet classes through its Pre-Ballet and Ballet Division; these programs focus on progressing students’ ballet training at their own pace while instilling strong foundations for continued classical ballet training. The Rock School students perform throughout the year in their annual production of The Nutcracker, Spring Showcase, and at various ballet competitions, including Youth America Grand Prix, with which it is an official partner school.

In 2023, a study from Northeastern University in the journal Scientific Reports named The Rock School as "the best ballet school" among the 1,603 U.S. ballet academies examined when evaluating competition success and subsequent professional dance employment, with more Rock School alumni proving successful than any other American school.

== Notable alumni ==
Since its founding, The Rock School for Dance Education has produced world class ballet dancers including brothers Isaac Hernández and Esteban Hernández, now at American Ballet Theatre and San Francisco Ballet, respectively, as well as Christine Shevchenko (American Ballet Theatre), Michaela DePrince (Boston Ballet), Beckanne Sisk (Houston Ballet), Derek Dunn (Boston Ballet), and Gilbert Bolden III (New York City Ballet).

- Michaela DePrince, Soloist, Boston Ballet, Dutch National Ballet
- Derek Dunn, Principal, Boston Ballet
- Isaac Hernández, Principal, San Francisco Ballet
- Sarah-Gabrielle Ryan, Principal, Pacific Northwest Ballet
- Christine Shevchenko, Principal, American Ballet Theatre
