= Princess Grace Foundation-USA =

Non-profit organization in the US

Princess Grace Foundation – USA
- Formation: 1982; 44 years ago
- Founder: Prince Rainier III
- Type: Charitable organization
- VAT ID no.: 23-2218331
- Headquarters: New York City, New York
- Chairman: Caroline, Princess of Hanover
- Vice Chairman: Prince Albert II
- Key people: Trustees: Princess Stéphanie of Monaco; Princess Charlene of Monaco; John F. Lehman; Robert O. Marx; Melia Bensussen; Raymond P. Caldiero; Gérard Cohen; Norman E. Donoghue
- Website: pgfusa.org

The Princess Grace Foundation – USA is a charity organization named after Princess Grace of Monaco, which supports emerging performers in theater, dance, and film in the form of awards, grants, scholarships, and fellowships. The Foundation holds an annual awards ceremony to recognize fledgling and established artists across the country. Prince Albert II of Monaco serves as its patron.

== History ==
The Foundation was established by Prince Rainier III of Monaco to honor the legacy of the late Princess Grace, who supported Monégasque arts in culture as well as numerous up-and-coming American artists during her lifetime. In 1982, Robert Hausman, founding Chairman, incorporated Princess Grace Foundation-USA as a non-profit public charity. The Board of Trustees at the time of its founding consisted of Frank Sinatra, Cary Grant, Roger Moore, John Johnson, William P. Rogers, Mary Wells Lawrence, and Lynn Wyatt.

The first financial grants in the form of scholarships, apprenticeships, and fellowships were awarded in 1984 to artists associated with schools or performing arts companies in the dance and theater. An arts advisory board composed of professionals in each of those fields was appointed to the Awards recipients. President Ronald Reagan, and First Lady Nancy Reagan oversaw the first gala at the White House in Washington, D.C.; The Foundation has continued with annual Awards Galas, rotating between New York City, Los Angeles and Monte Carlo. Currently, there are five avenues of funding for Award winners, available exclusively to Award winners and honoraria: Special Projects, Works in Progress in partnership with Baryshnikov Arts Center, Choreography Mentorship Co-Commission, Professional Development, and Professional Development partnerships for filmmakers.

== The Princess Grace Awards ==
The Princess Grace Awards are a ceremony held each year, hosted by the Princely Family of Monaco and the Princess Grace Foundation-USA, to recognize emerging and established artists in the performing arts. The five nomination categories include theater, playwriting, dance, choreography, and film.

=== The Princess Grace Statue Award ===
The Princess Grace Statue Awarded is the foundation's highest honor, received by artists who distinguish themselves in their respective disciplines after receiving a previous Princess Grace Award. In addition to a $25,000 cash gift, the awardees are presented with a bronze statuette of Princess Grace created by the Dutch artist Kees Verkade. As of 2020, sixty-seven artists have received this award, including Oscar Isaac, John M. Chu, Leslie Odom Jr., Chinonye Chukwu, Gillian Murphy, David Hallberg, Anna D. Shapiro, and Rose Bond.

=== The Prince Rainier III Award ===
The Prince Rainier III Award was inaugurated in 2005, after the passing of Prince Rainier. The Award is presented to established artists who are both highly celebrated in their careers and have made significant humanitarian contributions to their fields. The Award includes a grant to the philanthropic organization of the honorees's choice. Recipients to date include George Lucas, Glenn Close, Denzel Washington, Julie Andrews, Dick Van Dyke, Robert Redford, Queen Latifah and James Cameron.

=== Notable Princess Grace Awards Winners ===
==== Theater ====
- Jared Mezzocchi, 2012 Theater Fellowship
- Nicolette Robinson, 2009 Theater Scholarship, Gant Gaither Theater Award
- Scott Turner Schofield, 2007 Theater Fellowship - Acting, 2009 Special Project Award
- Oscar Isaac, 2004 Theater Scholarship
- Sam Gold, 2004 Theater Scholarship, 2018 Statue Award
- Leslie Odom Jr., 2002 Theater Scholarship, 2016 Statue Award
- Richard Kimmel, 2000 Theater Fellowship
- Anna Shapiro, 1996 Theater Apprenticeship, 2010 Statue Award
- Michael John Garcés, 1995 Theater Fellowship, 2007 Statue Award
- Eric Simonson, 1994 Theater Fellowship, 2005 Statue Award
- David Barrera, 1993 Theater Scholarship
- David Neumann, 1993 Theater Apprenticeship, 2011 Works in Progress Residency
- Paul Tazewell, 1993 Theater Fellowship, 2004 Statue Award
- Shishir Kurup, 1993 Theater Apprenticeship
- Donna Lynne Champlin, 1992 Theater Scholarship
- Michael Wilson, 1992 Theater Fellowship, 2001 Statue Award
- Ricardo Hernandez, 1992 Theater Apprenticeship, 2000 Statue Award
- Ty Taylor, 1990 Theater Scholarship
- Yareli Arizmendi, 1990 Theater Scholarship, 1995 Statue Award
- Christopher Ashley, 1989 Theater Apprenticeship, 1998 Statue Award
- Orlagh Cassidy, 1989 Theater Scholarship
- Bruce Graham, 1988 Theater Fellowship, 1991 Statue Award
- Tina Landau, 1988 Theater Scholarship, 1999 Statue Award
- Patrick Page, 1988 Theater Fellowship
- Anthony Kushner, 1987 Theater Fellowship, 1994 Statue Award
- Paul Warner, 1986 Theater Apprenticeship, 1987 Statue Award

==== Playwriting ====
- Kenneth Lin, 2005 Playwriting Fellowship
- Jesse Kellerman, 2003 Playwriting Fellowship
- Madeleine George, 2002 Playwriting Fellowship
- Sheila Callaghan, 2000 Playwriting Fellowship, 2008 Works in Progress Residency
- Bridget Carpenter, 1997 Playwriting Fellowship
- Adam Rapp, 1999 Playwriting Fellowship, 2006 Statue Award
- Kate Robin, 1995 Playwriting Fellowship, 2003 Statue Award

==== Dance ====
- Jacqueline Green, 2014 Dance Fellowship
- Isabella Boylston, 2009 Dance Fellowship
- Jeffrey Cirio, 2009 Dance Fellowship
- Joseph Walsh, 2009 Dance Fellowship
- Alexander Peters, 2008 Ballet Scholarship
- Blaine Hoven, 2008 Ballet Fellowship
- Jermel Johnson, 2008 Ballet Fellowship
- Lucien Postlewaite, 2008 Ballet Fellowship
- Andrew Bartee, 2007 Dance Scholarship - Ballet
- Brooklyn Mack, 2007 Dance Fellowship - Ballet
- Sarah Kathryn Lane, 2007 Dance Fellowship - Ballet
- Adrienne Benz, 2006 Dance Fellowship - Ballet
- Drew Jacoby, 2005 Dance Fellowship, 2008 Special Project Award
- John Lam, 2005 Dance Fellowship
- Tiler Peck, 2004 Dance Scholarship
- Christine Shevchenko, 2003 Dance Scholarship
- David Hallberg, 2002 Dance Fellowship
- Michele Jimenez, 2002 Dance Fellowship
- Jared Angle, 2001 Dance Fellowship
- Gonzalo Garcia, 2000 Dance Fellowship
- Lilyan Vigo-Ellis, 2000 Dance Fellowship, 2004 Special Project Grant
- Michele Wiles, 1999 Dance Fellowship
- Gillian Murphy, 1998 Dance Fellowship, 2009 Statue Award
- Maria Bystrova-Renko, 1998 Dance Scholarship
- Alexandra Ansanelli, 1997 Dance Fellowship
- Miranda Weese, 1995 Dance Fellowship
- Carlos Acosta, 1995 Dance Fellowship
- Maria Kowroski, 1994 Dance Scholarship, 2006 Statue Award
- Dormeshia Sumbry-Edwards, 1994 Dance Fellowship, 2017 Statue Award
- Derick Grant, 1993 Emerging Dance Artist
- Robert Battle, 1993 Dance Scholarship, 2007 Statue Award
- Jennie Renee Somogyi, 1992 Dance Scholarship, 2002 Statue Award
- Riolama Lorenzo, 1992 Dance Scholarship
- Ethan Stiefel, 1991 Emerging Dance Artist, 1999 Statue Award
- Kristin Long, 1990 Emerging Dance Artist
- Pauline Reyniack, née Golbin, 1990 Emerging Dance Artist, 1991 Statue Award
- Tina LeBlanc-Jerkunica, 1988 Dance Fellowship, 1995 Statue Award
- Elizabeth Walker, 1988 Dance Scholarship
- Diane Madden, 1986 Dance Fellowship, 1994 Statue Award
- Terese Capucilli, 1985 Dance Scholarship, 1986 Statue Award
- Li Cunxin, 1986 Dance Fellowship, 1993 Statue Award
- Amanda McKerrow, 1986 Dance Fellowship, 1987 Statue Award

==== Choreography ====
- Olivier Wevers, 2011 Choreography Fellowship
- Zoe Scofield, 2011 Choreography Fellowship
- Kyle Abraham, 2010 Dance-Choreography Fellowship
- Kate Weare, 2009 Choreography Fellowship
- Camille A. Brown, 2006 Choreography Fellowship - Modern

==== Film ====
- Chinonye Chukwu, 2009 Film Scholarship, 2019 Statue Award
- Ben Steinbauer, 2006 Graduate Film Scholarship
- Cary Joji Fukunaga, 2005 Graduate Film Scholarship
- Ben Russell, 2002 Graduate Film Scholarship, 2010 Special Project Grant
- Ham Tran, 2001 Graduate Film Scholarship, 2006 Special Project Grant
- Jon M. Chu, 2001 Film Scholarship, 2011 Statue Award
- David Riker, 1995 Graduate Film Scholarship, 2001 Statue Award
- Ilya Chaiken, 1994 Undergraduate Film Scholarship, 2003 Statue Award
- Parine Jaddo, 1993 Graduate Film Scholarship
- Mark Christopher, 1992 Graduate Film Scholarship, 2005 Statue Award
- Rose Bond, 1989 Graduate Film Scholarship, 2008 Statue Award
- Eric Darnell, 1989 Graduate Film Scholarship
- Stephen Hillenburg, 1991 Graduate Film Scholarship, 2002 Statue Award
- Gregory Mottola, 1989 Graduate Film Scholarship, 1998 Statue Award
