= Boston Arts Festival =

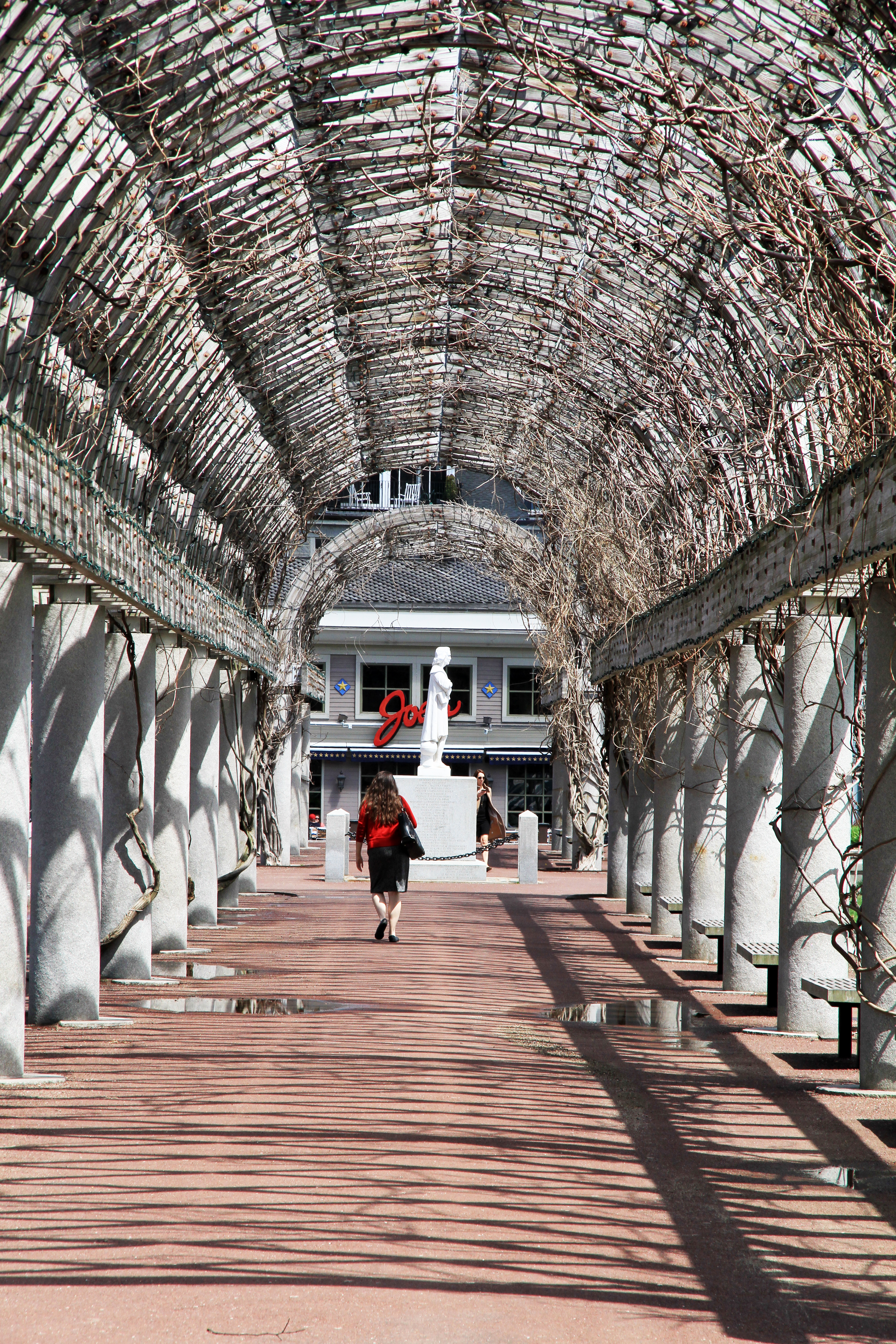
Close-up of a grape arbor in Christopher Columbus Waterfront Park.

The Boston Arts Festival is an annual event showcasing Boston's visual and performing arts community and promoting Boston's Open Studios program. The weekend-long Festival at Christopher Columbus Waterfront Park features a wide variety of arts and high-end crafts, including painting, photography, ceramics, jewelry, sculpture and live music. The Arts Festival, which has existed in several different forms, was relaunched by former Mayor Thomas Menino in 2003, then reconceived by Mayor Marty Walsh in 2015. The Beacon Hill Art Walk and Artists Crossing Gallery will be organizing the 2019 September Festival.

The original Festival, briefly named the "Boston Art Festival," was held at Boston's Public Garden between 1952 and 1964. That version is credited with democratizing access to the fine arts in Boston, especially for young, emerging and often Jewish-American, artists who felt shut out of Boston's famously Brahmin museums and other institutional exhibition sites. Activist artists, either linked by the Boston Museum School or the Boris Mirski Gallery founded the Boston Arts Festival. The first Festival debuted on June 12, 1952, and displayed fine art in tents in the Public Garden, and provided free performances in nearby Boston Common. This represented a major break in how art was presented in New England. No longer confined to the monied and the elite, the early Festivals provided avant garde artists with a forum in which to show their work, compete and interact with one another. That exchange of ideas and influences developed into the earliest form of American Figurative Expressionism, known as Boston Expressionism.

== History ==
The Boston Arts Festival had roots in 1940s' meetings organized to protest Boston's Institute of Contemporary Art, then known as the Institute of Modern Art. Artists like Hyman Bloom, Karl Zerbe, Ben Shahn, Jack Levine, Joyce Reopel, Mel Zabarsky and began gathering to discuss fears "that the Institute would ... become a showcase for ... something quite different that what we thought it ought to show and support," Arthur Polonsky said later. Zerbe's experience with Boston's Museum of Fine Arts, which only "owned one watercolor, and at a time when his work was being acquired quite seriously, with pleasure, by some of the other institutions," stoked those fears. The meetings jumpstarted the formation of the New England Chapter for Artist's Equity, an artist's union that advocated for more equitable commissions and representation.

"[It was] really an Equity activity." Arthur Polonsky said of the Boston Arts Festival in an oral history with the Archives of American Art. "It was taken up by a group of businessmen later, with the collaboration of artists and gallery people, and it became the first experimental Boston Arts Festival a year later, but preceding that, that year, I remember actually working on a station wagon at night, hauling paintings in from what was then the Copley Plaza out to the exhibit place. Equity had a booth of its own in the first Arts Festival — six years of that — simply giving out information on the organization."

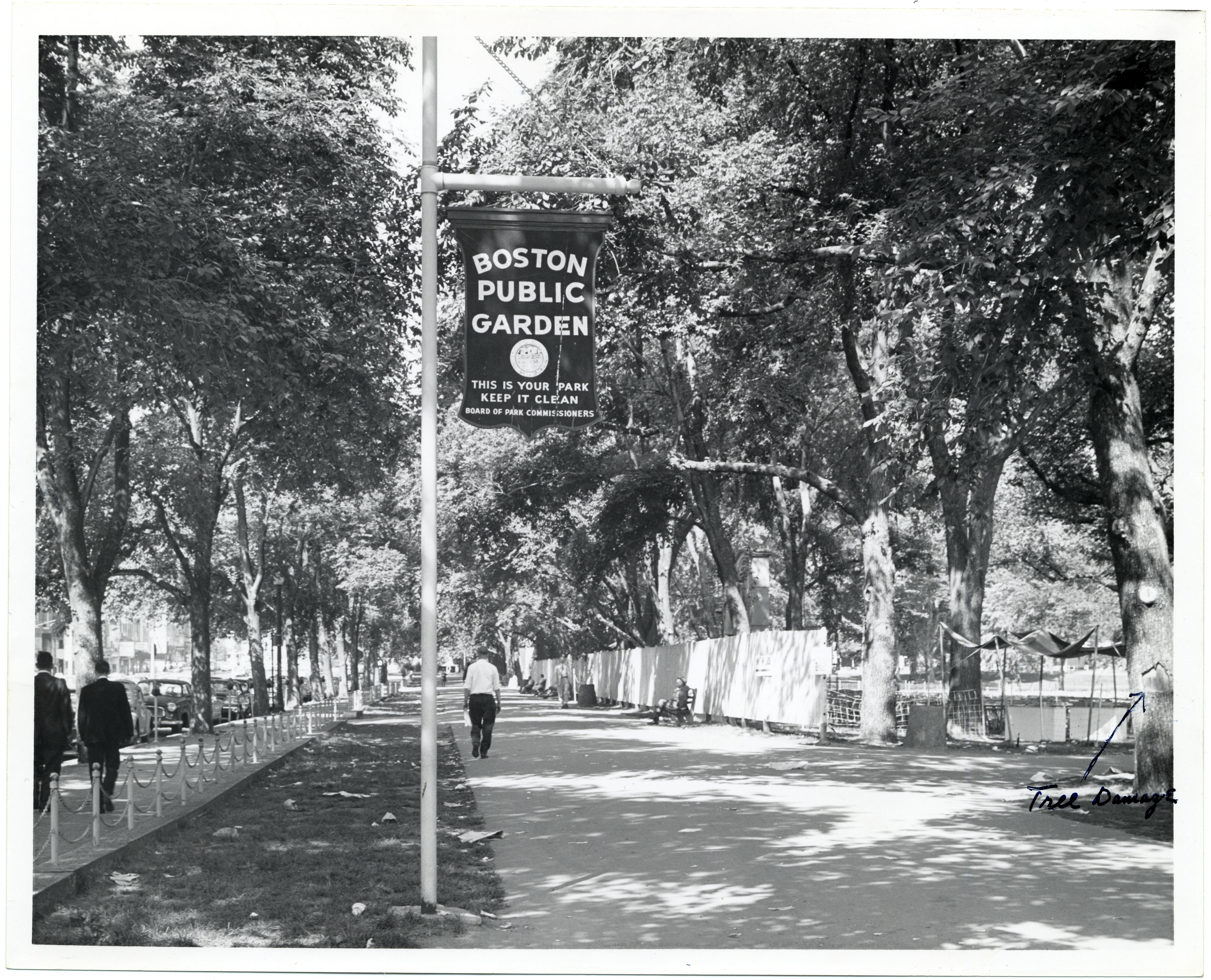
The original Boston Arts Festival was held in Boston's Public Garden.

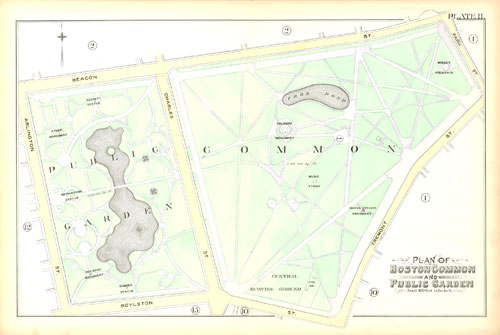
Map of the Public Garden and the Boston Common.

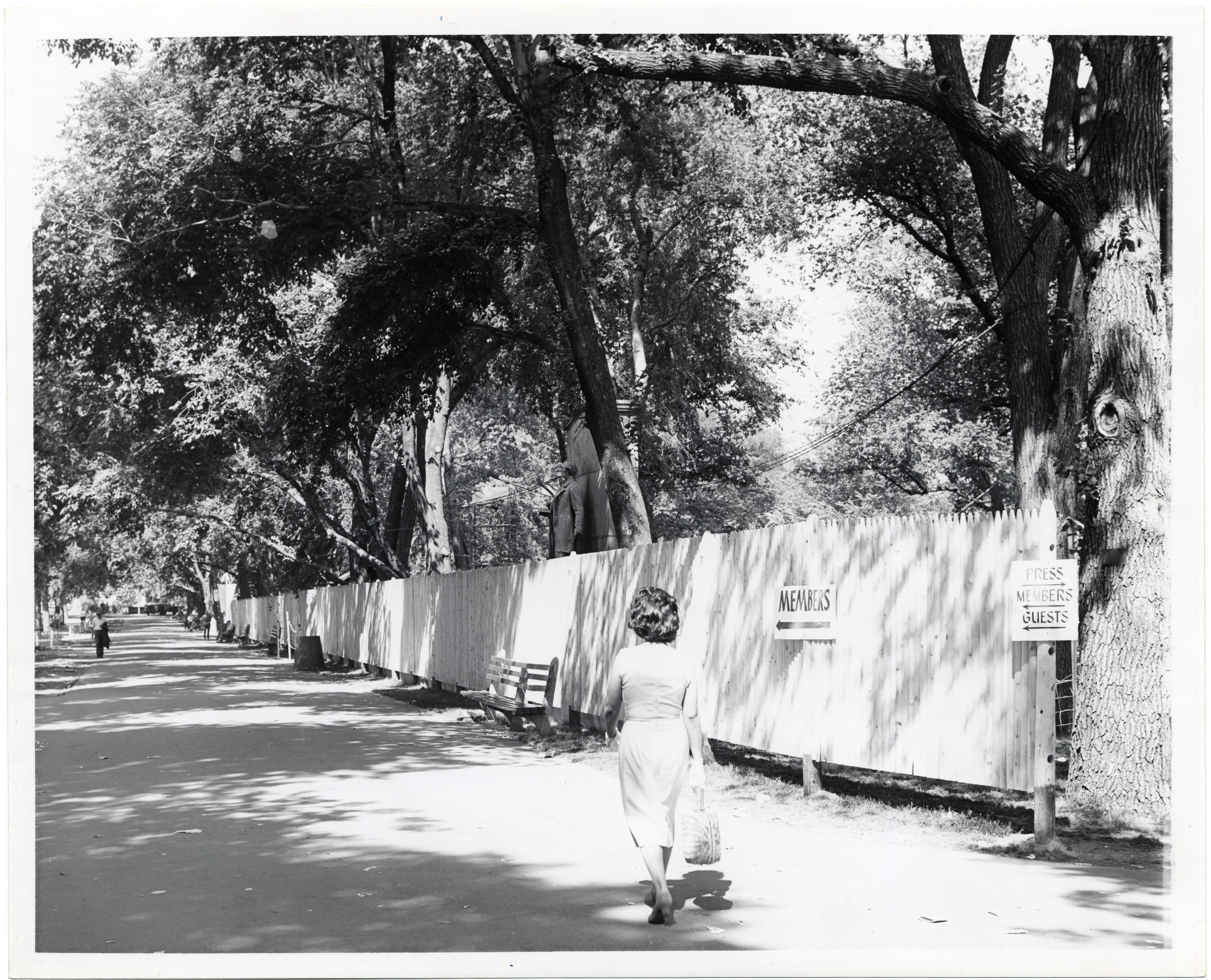
Fences on the edge of an early Boston Arts Festival in Boston Public Garden.

In their work, the artists were, critic Adam Zucker writes, "inspired largely by political and/or social issues and conflicts." Thus, the impetus behind the Festivals was not only political, but also identity-oriented. "Like German Expressionism, the American arts movement addresses issues at the heart of the expressionist sensibility, such as personal and group identity in the modern world, the role of the artist as a witness to issues such as violence and corruption, and the nature of the creative process and its implications." In 1952, Boston's art world did not welcome outsiders, and few galleries exhibited their work. "Looking back to the 1950s there were few opportunities to see works by contemporary Boston artists in a museum setting." Charles Guiliano writes. "Despite a young new director, Perry T. Rathbone (July 3, 1911 – Jan. 15th, 2000), who was intent on making the Museum of Fine Arts more progressive that did not extend to embracing the dominantly Jewish Boston Expressionists. In the traditional Brahmin arts community there were elements of racism and anti semitism...." "There was a dichotomy between the conservative, traditional painters of the venerable, Copley Society, and the more progressive artists," Further, Guiliano notes, "[t]he more traditional and socially acceptable artists showed with the Copley Society or the Guild of Boston Artists. The work of Jews, immigrants or their sons, like the Lebanese/American Gibran, showed with gallerist Boris Mirski or his former assistants Hyman Swetzoff and Alan Fink of Alpha Gallery."

The inclusion of juried shows also provided a forum for artistic distinction that generated interest. "[T]here was palpable excitement visiting the annual Boston Arts Festival. In addition to exhibiting fine arts there was a stage for live performances," Guiliano continues," I recall jazz by the renowned Boston baritone sax player, Serge Chaloff, a play by William Saroyan, and a solo ballet performance by Maria Tallchief. The ambitious festival (1955–1962) organized by Nelson Aldrich ended through a lack of funding. An attempt to revive it decades later was embarrassed when the theft of a painting by Barney Rubenstein occurred because of a lack of security. There were prizes awarded by jurors of the BAF resulting in debates and controversy. This focused on a perceived dichotomy between traditional still life and landscape works and more progressive forms of abstraction. Visitors voted for a Popular Prize. In 1956 that was awarded to Kahlil Gibran for his memorable “St. John the Baptist.” It stunned and amazed me. With then limited experience it was the greatest work of art I had seen.

"...[I]t seemed like a good, exuberant, democratic, freeing kind of idea to many of us," artist Arthur Polonsky said. "It was very hearty, the sensations among the artists of Boston in those festivals of the first years, certainly, and the public. And much was accomplished. People like Robert Frost and MacLeish had taken it all very seriously. Productions in opera, along with that fragile tent city of exhibitions went up each year."

Of prime importance to the artists was that all of the events and exhibitions at the Boston Arts Festival were free of charge. This is a point the Guide to the Boston Arts Festival Records states repeatedly, while also noting the Festival eventually became cost prohibitive: "The first festival included a free program of painting, sculpture and music presented outdoors at the Boston Public Garden. Over the years, the Festival would expand upon this program by adding film, dance, and theater. The duration of the Festival was gradually increased as well. At various times, the selection process of the art shows and the perceived focus on modern arts attracted controversy, and the Festival often faced budget shortfalls due in part to the decision to allow free admittance to all performances while trying to provide quality programming on a large scale. Nonetheless, the Festival continued to operate with the goal of presenting a mass audience with a 'broad cross-section of the arts of our time [and arts] of as high an artistic standard as economically possible' until 1964.

== Revived festival ==
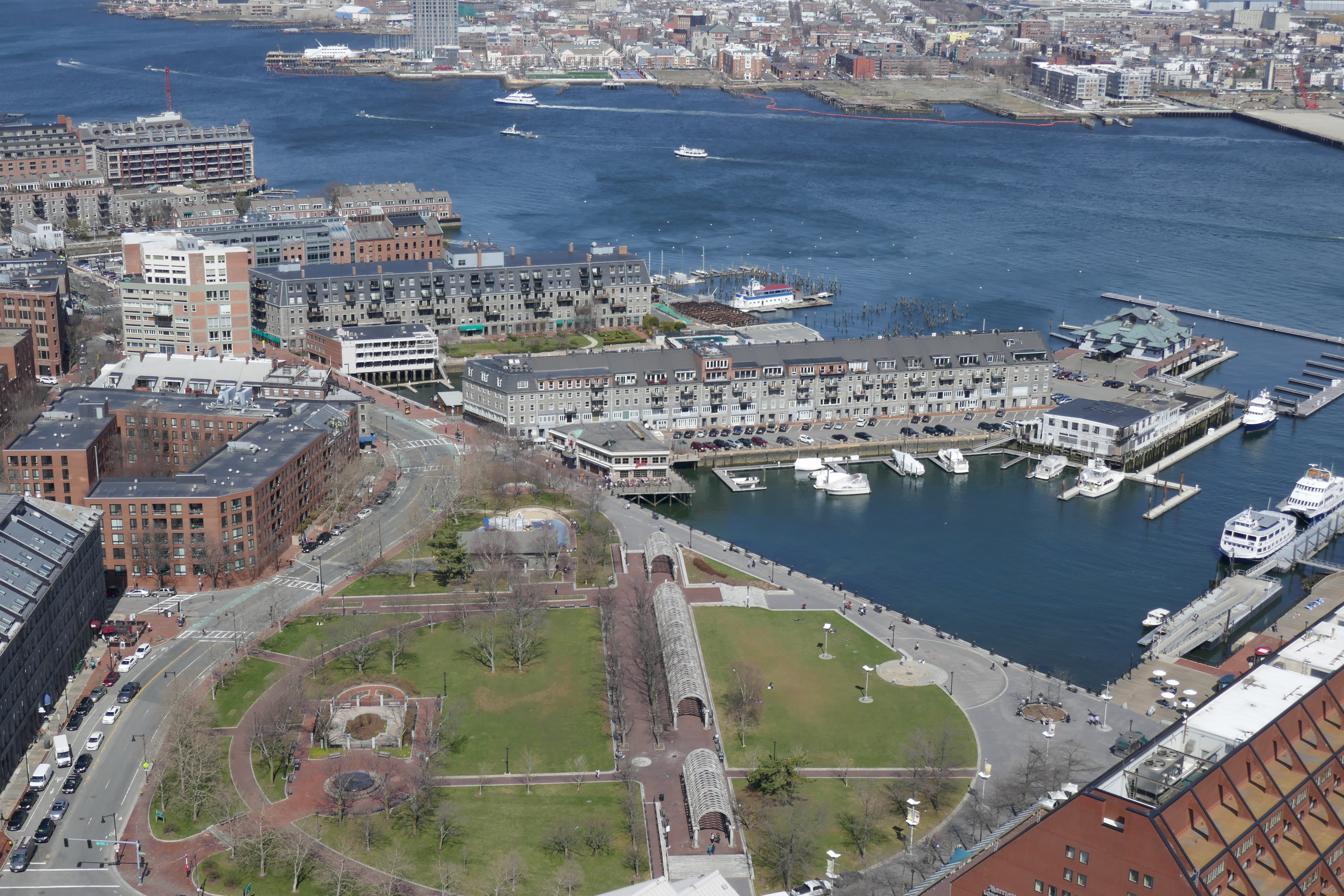
Aerial View of Christopher Columbus Waterfront Park.

Mayor Thomas M. Menino revived the Boston Arts Festival in 2003 as a one-day event, intended to launch Boston Open Studios and the 2003 performing arts season. The festival drew huge crowds to the newly re-designed Christopher Columbus Park on Boston’s Waterfront. Highlights of the event included lively performances by Boston Lyric Opera, performing Italian arias, La Piñata presenting folkloric dance, the Mayor’s Mural Crew offering interactive mural painting and watercolor exercises, and reports from some visual artists of record-breaking sales.

The Festival was expanded to two days in 2004, with highlight performances from Boston Ballet and Jazz Hip Hop Orchestra, and huge crowd attendance. In 2005, the Festival coincided with Boston’s 375th Birthday. To celebrate, some Festival performances were relocated downtown and to Faneuil Hall. Boston Ballet performed again alongside Chu Ling Dance and Haitian singer Gi Frants.

The Festival drew record crowds in 2007, when juried artists exhibited and sold their artwork in a specially built artists’ village. Opera Boston made their festival debut to great acclaim as did up-and-coming harpist Maeve Gilchrist on the new Garden Stage to complement the Waterfront Stage. Boston Pops Ensemble and the very popular Boston Gay Men's Chorus also made their debuts.

The 2008 Festival, building on the success of the 2007 Festival, expanded to become a three-day event. Visual artists were now able to exhibit and sell their work on Friday while special guests Blue Man Group and Buffalo Tom entertained audiences from the Waterfront Stage. Despite the wettest day in the festival's short history, large crowds turned out as the festival opened to great energy. The rest of the weekend brought better weather and a full entertainment program on two stages. An attendance record was set for the Festival on Saturday with an unprecedented turnout and individual artists reported record sales. Boston Children's Museum provided activities for children alongside the Mayor's Mural Crew. The Garden Stage played host to Pan United and harpist Áine Minogue, amongst others, while on the Waterfront stage, the upcoming group Everyday Visuals shared billing with dance troupe OrigiNation, songwriter Bleu, and for the seventh year in a row, Boston Ballet.

== Festival reorganization ==
In 2015, Mayor Martin J. Walsh announced that the annual Boston Arts (Ahts) Festival would be re-imagined as Emerge, a one-day celebration of local arts and culture. That version of the Festival evolved over the next four years. Plans for the 2019 Festival note that it will be organized by "Beacon Hill Art Walk and Artists Crossing Gallery, and will launch Boston’s Arts Open Studios season featuring more than 70 juried local visual artists and craftspeople, plus local musicians performing on the Waterfront Stage throughout the day."
