= Lia Cirio =

American ballet dancer

- Occupation: ballet dancer
- Career
- Current group: Boston Ballet
- Former groups: Trey McIntyre Project

Lia Cirio is an American ballet dancer. She is a principal dancer at Boston Ballet.

== Biography ==
Cirio is half Filipino. She trained at Swarthmore Ballet Theatre and Central Pennsylvania Youth Ballet. At age 16, she joined Boston Ballet II. She joined the main company's corps de ballet in 2004, at age 16, and was the company's Princess Grace Award nominee the same year. Cirio was named second soloist in 2006 and soloist the following year. In 2008 and 2009, Cirio joined the Trey McIntyre Project, and toured with the company in the United States and the world. She returned to Boston Ballet in the 2009–10 season and was promoted to principal in 2010. She has danced roles such as Odette/Odile in Swan Lake and the title role in Cinderella.

Cirio has also choreographed work for Boston Ballet's ChoreograpHER initiative.

Cirio is the older sister of Jeffrey Cirio, a Lead Principal Dancer at English National Ballet. They have established an artistic collective called Cirio Collective in 2015.

== Selected repertoire ==
Cirio's repertoire with the Boston Ballet includes:

- Afternoon of a Faun (principal nymph)
- Apollo
- Ballo della Regina
- La Bayadère (Nikiya, Gamzatti, Lead Shade)
- Cinderella (Cinderella, Winter Fairy),
- Giselle (Myrtha, Peasant pas de deux)
- Don Quixote (Kitri, Mercedes, Queen of the Dryads)
- Etudes (the Ballerina)
- "Emeralds" and "Diamond" from Jewels
- Lady of the Camellias (Olympe)
- A Midsummer Night's Dream
- The Nutcracker (Sugar Plum Fairy, Dew Drop Fairy, Snow Queen, Arabian)
- Paquita (principal role)
- Serenade
- The Sleeping Beauty (Aurora, Lilac Fairy, Woodland Glade Fairy)
- Swan Lake (Odette/Odile, pas de trois, pas de cinq, Four Little Swans)
- La Sylphide (principal)
- Les Sylphides (the Sylph)
- Symphony in C (second movement)
- Theme and Variations
- La Valse

=== Created roles ===
- Awake Only
- Brake the Eyes
- Carmen (Micaela)
- Sharper Side of Dark
