= Seo Hye Han =

South Korean ballet dancer

Seo Hye Han (born 1988) is a South Korean ballet dancer. She is presently a principal dancer with the Boston Ballet.

== Early life and education ==
Han was born in 1988 and grew up in South Korea. She graduated from the Korea National University of Arts in 2009.

== Career ==
Han danced with the Universal Ballet Company as a soloist for three seasons, then joined the Boston Ballet as a soloist in 2013. In 2016, she was promoted to principal dancer.

== Awards and honors ==
In 2004, Han won a silver medal at Bulgaria's Varna International Ballet Competition. The following year, she received a scholarship to attend the Vaganova Academy of Russian Ballet following her performance at the Prix de Lausanne. In 2008, she received another silver medal at the Varna International Ballet Competition, as well as a silver medal at the Seoul International Dance Competition. In 2010, Han was awarded the Joffrey Prize based on her performance at the USA International Ballet Competition. Two years later, she won the gold medal at the Boston International Ballet Competition.
