= Haley Schwan =

Boston Ballet dancer

Haley Schwan is a soloist with the Boston Ballet.

== Early life ==
Haley Schwan grew up in Dearborn, Michigan where she studied gymnastics, jazz, tap, ballet, and contemporary jazz. She moved away from home at the age of 12 to train at the Kirov Academy of Ballet in Washington, D.C.. At 16 years old, she move to St. Petersburg, Russia to train at the Vaganova Ballet Academy.

== Career ==
After completing her studies at the Vaganova Ballet Academy in 2010, Schwan joined the corps de ballet at Staatsballet Berlin (Berlin State Ballet), where she remained for five seasons. During her time with Stattballet Berlin, she danced solos created for her in Marco Goecke's And the Sky on that Cloudy Day and Itzik Galili's Open Square.

In 2015, Schwan moved to New York City as a freelance dancer and choreographer. During this time, she worked with Emery LeCrone and Twyla Tharp. She also acted in S. Dylan Zwickel's immersive theater production Here We Dance and choreographed Iggy Azalea and Rita Ora's performance of "Black Widow" for the MTV VMAs.

Schwan joined the Boston Ballet in 2017 and was promoted to second soloist in 2020 and soloist in 2022. She has also choreographed for the company for BB@home: ChoreograpHER.
