= Paul Craig (dancer) =

American principal ballet dancer

Paul Craig is an American principal dancer at the Boston Ballet and Circio Collective.

== Early life ==
When Craig was six years old, he wanted to begin tap lessons after seeing Gene Kelly perform on television. At ten years old, Craig began dancing at the Conservatory of Dance and the Blue Lake Fine Arts Camp. As part of the Blue Lake Fine Arts Camp's International Exchange Program, Craig traveled to Germany, Italy, and France in 2002.

Later, Craig received the Garold Gardner Scholarships to train at the Virginia School of the Arts. Before graduating, he received the Virginia School of the Arts Merit Award, as well as the Dean's Award.

Craig began training with the Boston Ballet School in 2006.

== Career ==
Craig joined Boston Ballet II in 2007, during which time he traveled to perform in Russia. Craig was subsequently promoted to Corps de Ballet in 2008, Second Soloist in 2014, Soloist in 2015, and Principal in 2017.

Craig has performed in Jacob's Pillow, the Tanglewood Music Festival, the Cape Cod Dance Festival, the Spoleto Festival, the World Ballet Competition Gala, and the American Dance Competition Gala. He has also traveled to perform in South Korea, Spain, Germany, France, Finland, Mexico, England, and Canada.

He is also a production manager with Circio Collective, a contemporary dance company in Boston. With the help of the Circio Collective, Craig choreographed "The Fourth Way" with musician Josh Knowles.

Craig has taught master classes at the Conservatory of Dance in Manistee, Michigan, the Crooked Tree Arts Center in Petoskey, Michigan, and Camp Harbor View, a nonprofit Boston outreach program.
