= Patricia Ruanne =

British ballerina (1945–2022)

- Born: 3 June 1945; Leeds, Yorkshire, England
- Died: 1 November 2022 (aged 77); Rome, Italy
- Occupations: Ballerina, ballet mistress, teacher and director

Patricia Ruanne (3 June 1945 – 1 November 2022) was a British ballerina, ballet mistress, teacher, repetiteur, and director.

== Early life ==
Ruanne was born in Leeds, Yorkshire on 3 June 1945 to Robert and Joan Ruane (née Castell). She had an younger brother named Paul.

== Career ==
Aged 13, Ruanne was accepted into the Royal Ballet School. In 1962, at the age of 17, she joined The Royal Ballet, rising to principal in 1969. Her first lead role was as the Girl in Kenneth MacMillan's The Invitation at the age of 18, and Giselle was her first full-length classical role.

The majority of Ruanne's work was with the touring company, and she created roles in many works. In 1973, she joined London Festival Ballet, led by its director Beryl Grey, in order to dance the classic roles, including Aurora in Rudolf Nureyev's production of Sleeping Beauty, and created the role of Juliet in his production of Romeo and Juliet.

Ruanne created a number of leading roles including the Siren in Barry Moreland's Prodigal Son in Ragtime, the Lady in Red in Ronald Hynd's The Sanguine Fan in 1976, and danced the London premiere of Hynd's Rosalinda.

In 1983, as she was retiring, John Cranko's Onegin was brought and taught to London Festival Ballet by the original Tatiana Marcia Haydée, then director of the Stuttgart Ballet. This was the first production of the ballet by an English company (it did not enter The Royal Ballet's repertoire until 2001), and Ruanne was nominated for the Laurence Olivier Award for Outstanding Achievement in Dance by the Society of West End Theatres.

Ruanne was the ballet mistress at London Festival Ballet from 1983 to 1985, and then at Paris Opera Ballet from 1986 to 1996, having joined at the request of Rudolf Nureyev, who was then the director of the Paris Opera Ballet. She was the acting director at La Scala from 1999 to 2000.

From 1996 onwards, Ruanne worked as a freelance teacher and repetiteur.

== Personal life and death ==
In 1972, she married Richard Farley, a former Royal Ballet dancer and photographer. She would later marry Frederic Jahn.

In 1981, she appeared as the castaway on Radio 4's Desert Island Discs, where her favourite track was the Romeo and Juliet ballet suite by Sergei Prokofiev, her book was The Lord of the Rings by J. R. R. Tolkien, and her luxury was sunglasses.

Ruanne died on 1 November 2022, at the age of 77.

== Commemoration ==
Ruanne's name is one of those featured on the sculpture Ribbons, unveiled in 2024.
