= Parine Jaddo =

Iraqi Arab Americanfilm director

- Born: Baghdad, Iraq
- Occupation: Filmmaker
- Known for: Rasta's Paradise
- Website: http://parinejaddo.com/

Parine Jaddo (Arabic: بارين جدو; born in Baghdad, Iraq in 1956) is an Iraqi Arab Americanfilm director.

== Biography ==
Jaddo was born in Baghdad into a working class intellectual and artistic family that was forced to move frequently due to political turmoil in the Middle East. Her family escaped from Iraq and moved to Lebanon where she studied biology at the American University of Beirut with plans to become a medical doctor soon her family fled Lebanon when civil war broke out in the mid-'70s despite her staying to finish her degree, where she was sheltered by an American couple from San Diego.

Following the Israeli invasion of Lebanon in 1982, Jaddo came to the U.S. She attended Howard University, where she completed her master's in fine arts with a speciality in film in 1995.

The short movie Aisha, was shot on a 35mm film while a film professor at Howard University was filmed on the eve of the first American conflict with Iraq. This movie was screened at the Women's Museum of Art in Washington DC.

She has also worked on Sankofa with the Ethiopian film maker Haile Gerima.

Her first documentary, Broken Record, which was inspired by the passing of her mother, was screened at the Reel Iraq festival in the United Kingdom in 2013.

She currently resides and works in Beirut, Lebanon, where she has collaborated with the Arab Image Foundation and taught film courses at a number of universities.

== Filmography ==
- Atash (1995)
- Inside/Out (1997) (assistant editor, script supervisor)
- Aisha (2000) (director)
- Tayh (Astray) (2003)
- Rasta's Paradise
- Broken Record (2013)

== Awards ==
- Princess Grace Award
