= The King of All the World =

2021 musical drama film by Carlos Saura

- Spanish: El rey de todo el mundo
- Directed by: Carlos Saura
- Written by: Carlos Saura
- Produced by: Eusebio Pacha
- Starring: Greta Elizondo; Isaac Hernández; Ana de la Reguera; Manuel García Rulfo; Damián Alcázar; Enrique Arce; Manolo Cardona
- Cinematography: Vittorio Storaro
- Edited by: Vanesa Marinbert
- Music by: Alfonso G. Aguilar; Carlos Rivera
- Production companies: Pipa Films; Pacha Inversiones y Producciones Audiovisuales
- Distributed by: Syldavia Cinema
- Release dates: 4 October 2021 (FICG); 12 November 2021 (Spain)
- Countries: Mexico; Spain
- Language: Spanish

The King of All the World (Spanish: El rey de todo el mundo) is a 2021 musical drama film directed and written by Carlos Saura. A Mexico-Spain co-production, the cast is led by Ana de la Reguera, Manuel García Rulfo, Damián Alcázar, Enrique Arce, Manolo Cardona, Isaac Hernández and Greta Elizondo.

== Plot ==
Manuel—a stage director—invites Sara—a renowned choreographer—to help him with a new musical. They cast Inés—a young dancer—to star in the musical act.

== Cast ==
- Greta Elizondo as Inés.
- Ana de la Reguera as Sara.
- Manuel García Rulfo as Manuel.
- Isaac Hernández as Diego
- Damián Alcázar
- Enrique Arce
- Manolo Cardona
- Izaak Alatorre
- Giovanna Reynaud
- Eulalia Ramón

== Production ==
A Mexico-Spain international co-production, The King of All the World was produced by Pipa Films and Pacha Inversiones y Producciones Audiovisuales, in collaboration with Canal 44 and COFIEJ and with support from EFICINE and the Universidad de Guadalajara. Vittorio Storaro worked as director of cinematography. Eusebio Pacha took over production duties. Filming took place in Guadalajara, Jalisco, primarily at the Conjunto Santander de Artes Escénicas. It began on 4 March 2019 and wrapped on 15 April 2019.

== Release ==
The film screened on 4 October 2021 at the 36th Guadalajara Film Festival (FICG). It is set to screen at the 66th Valladolid Film Festival (SEMINCI). Distributed by Syldavia Cinema, it will be theatrically released in Spain on 12 November 2021. It is also selected as opening film at the 52nd International Film Festival of India to be screened on 20 November 2021.

== See also ==
- List of Spanish films of 2021
