= Viktorina Kapitonova =

Russian ballerina (born 1985)

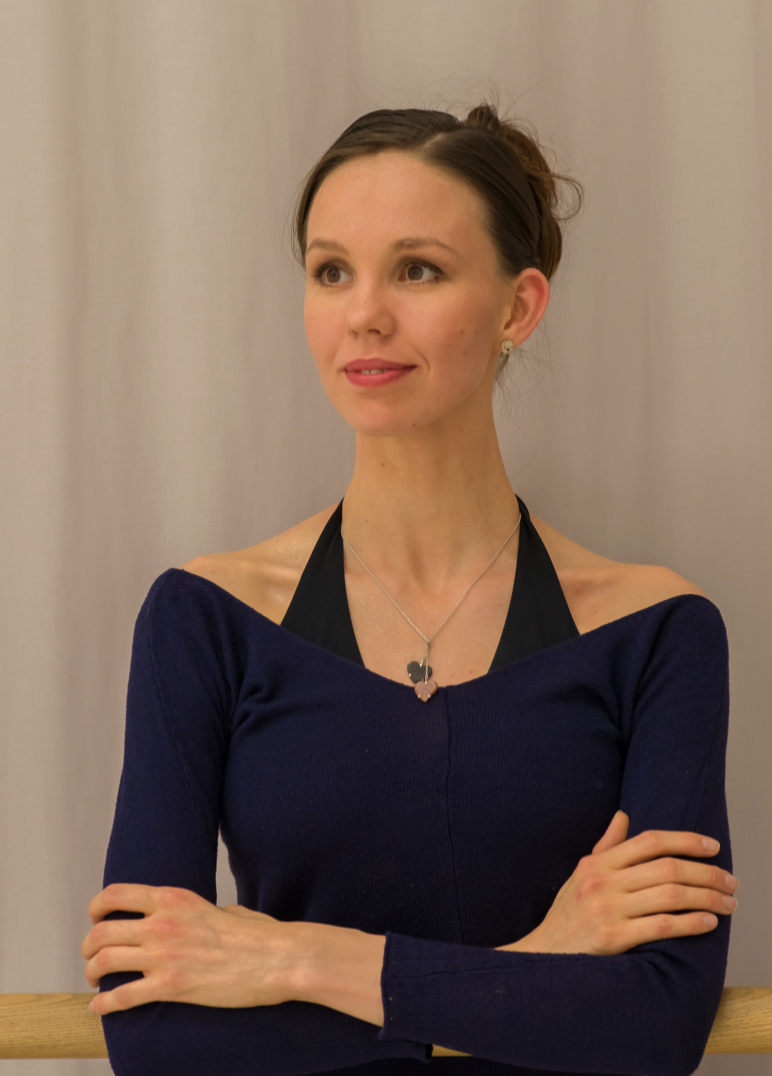
- 2015
- Born: June 30, 1985 (age 41); Cheboksary, Chuvashia, Soviet Union
- Education: Kazan Ballet School
- Occupation: Prima ballerina
- Height: 168 cm (5 ft 6 in)
- Career
- Current group: Boston Ballet
- Former groups: Ballett Zürich, Stanislavski and Nemirovich-Danchenko Moscow Academic Music Theatre Dzhalilja Opera House, Kazan
- Dances: Swan Lake, Giselle, Anna Karenina (Christian Spuck)

Viktorina Kapitonova (born June 30, 1985) is a Russian ballerina. She is a principal dancer with Boston Ballet.

== Early life and education ==
Kapitonova was born in Cheboksary a city in the north of Chuvashia, a regional republic of Russia. The eldest daughter of beekeepers, she started to study ballet at the age of nine at a local school.

== Career ==
At the age of 12, Kapitonova was accepted in to the Kazan Ballet School. There in the Dzhalilja Opera House in 2005, she danced solo roles in Swan Lake, Sleeping Beauty, Don Quixote, La Bayadère, Coppélia and The Nutcracker. Kapitonova won the prize of "Young Ballet of Russia" and the "Arabesque" competitions. Kapitonova also invited to train in Moscow's Bolshoi Ballet as part of a training program.

In season 2008/09, Kapitonova moved to the Stanislavski and Nemirovich-Danchenko Moscow Academic Music Theatre in Moscow, before accepting an offer from Heinz Spoerli to dance in Ballett Zürich as a principal dancer. Kapitonova was a guest dancer in Zagreb Operhouse for two weeks in the lead role of Swan Lake.

Under the Swiss choreographer and artistic director Heinz Spoerli, Kapitonova danced modern style choreographies and leading roles of classical ballets, culminating in Spoerli's Odile/Odette in his version of Swan Lake. In 2012 Kapitonova danced at Spoerli's Farewell Gala that toured Switzerland.

Kapitonova has worked with the following choreographers: Alexei Ratmansky, Derek Deane, Patrice Bart, Nacho Duato, Douglas Lee, Wayne McGregor, Edward Clug, Hans van Manen, Marius Petipa, Yury Grigorovich, George Balanchine. Mats Ek, William Forsythe, Paul Lightfoot and Jiří Kylián

In 2014 Ballett Zürich director Christian Spuck created a new full-length ballet of Leo Tolstoy "Anna Karenina" for Kapitonova. Which was awarded a Critic's choice for 'Outstanding Performance by a Female Artist' in Dance Europe Magazine in October 2015. Anna Karenina was also awarded a critic's award for 'Best Premiere'.

In 2015 Kapitonova danced the lead in Giselle for the first time with international guest stars Roberto Bolle and Friedemann Vogel from which she received positive feedback from the audience and the critics. Kapitonova opened the Mini-Giselle Festival performances at Staatsballett Berlin on 3 March 2016 which included Polina Semionova, Maria Eichwald and Iana Salenko.

On 6 February 2016, Kapitonova danced Odile Odette at the world premiere of Alexei Ratmansky's reconstruction of Petipa/Ivanov's original Swan Lake choreography following Stepanov notations stored at Harvard University. Receiving critical acclaim for her performances.

Kapitonova won the 'Ballet Friends of Zürich Prize' for best ballerina for the season 2014/15 for her stage presence, technique and impact on the stage. In an interview by SRF, Kapitonova pledged to give the CHF3,000 to her family in Russia.

In 2018 Kapitonova joined Boston Ballet as a Principal Ballet Dancer.

Kapitonova often performs as a guest performer in international ballet galas, such as Roberto Bolle & Friends and Marika Besobrasova International Dance Gala In the summer 2015, Kapitonova performed in Elisa Carrillo Cabrera's 'Elisa y Amigos' gala in Mexico with other international dance stars.

Kapitonova had the honour of opening the 15th Anniversary Dance Open Gala of the Stars in April 2016.
