= Dreams (2025 film) =

2025 film by Michel Franco

- Mexican theatrical release poster
- Directed by: Michel Franco
- Written by: Michel Franco
- Produced by: Michel Franco; Eréndira Núñez Larios; Alexander Rodnyansky
- Starring: Jessica Chastain; Isaac Hernández; Rupert Friend
- Cinematography: Yves Cape
- Edited by: Óscar Figueroa
- Production companies: AR Content; Eastern Film; Freckle Films; Teorema
- Distributed by: Imagem Films (Mexico); Greenwich Entertainment (United States)
- Release dates: February 15, 2025 (Berlinale); September 11, 2025 (Mexico); February 27, 2026 (United States)
- Running time: 98 minutes
- Countries: Mexico; United States
- Languages: English; Spanish
- Box office: $379,725

Dreams is a 2025 drama film produced, written and directed by Michel Franco. It follows the secret affair of wealthy socialite Jennifer (Jessica Chastain) with Mexican ballet dancer and illegal immigrant Fernando (Isaac Hernández). The supporting cast includes Rupert Friend, Marshall Bell, Eligio Meléndez and Mercedes Hernández.

The film had its world premiere in the main competition of the 75th Berlin International Film Festival on 15 February 2025, where it was nominated for the Golden Bear. It was theatrically released in Mexico on 11 September 2025 by Imagem Films, and was released in the United States on 27 February 2026.

== Cast ==
- Jessica Chastain as Jennifer McCarthy
- Isaac Hernández as Fernando Rodriguez
- Rupert Friend as Jake McCarthy
- Marshall Bell as Michael McCarthy
- Eligio Meléndez as Fernando's Father
- Mercedes Hernández as Fernando's Mother

== Production ==
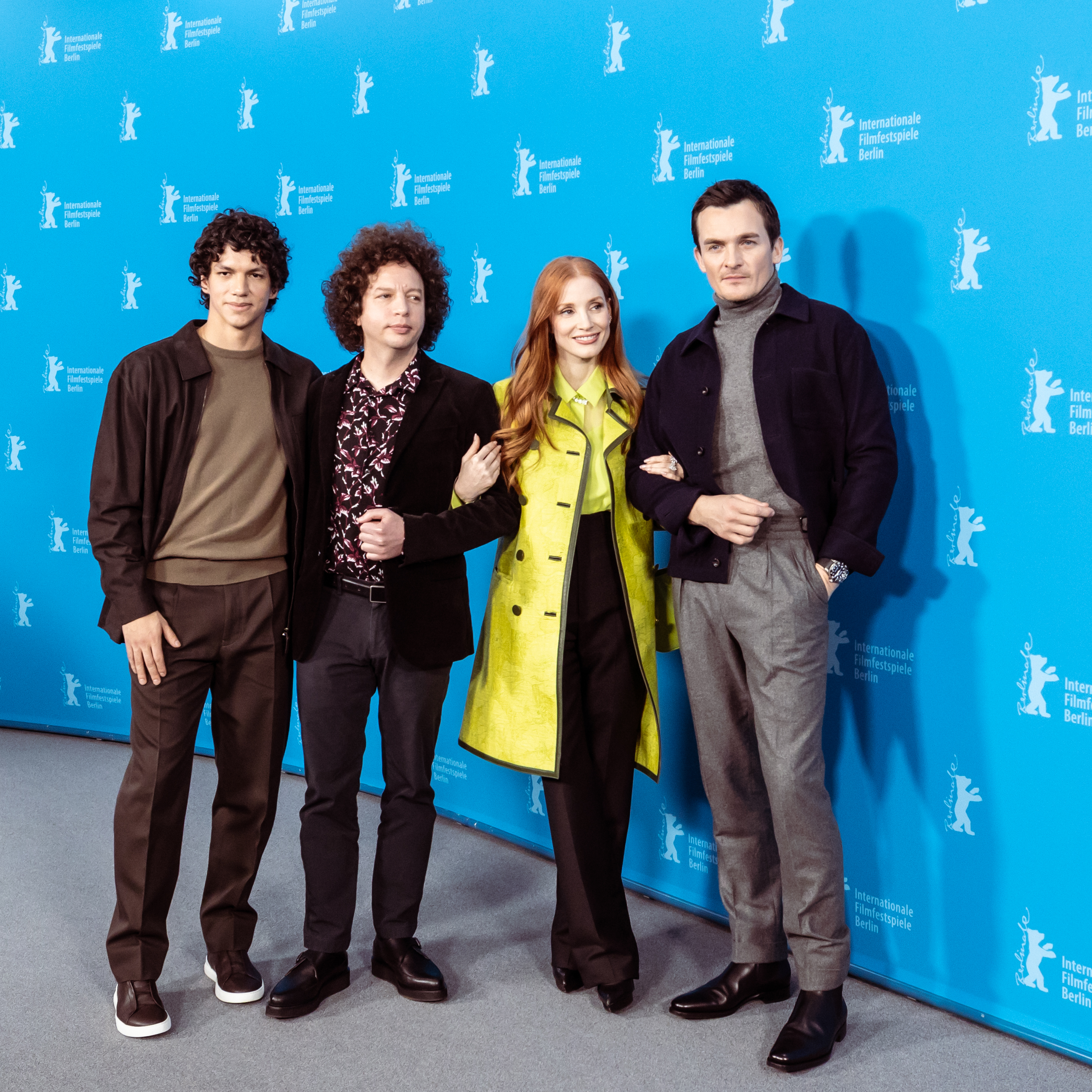
Franco and the film's stars at the 75th Berlin International Film Festival

In September 2023, it was announced that the film was in post-production after filming wrapped in San Francisco. The film was also shot in Mexico City. The filmmakers were granted a waiver from SAG-AFTRA which granted them to make the film during the 2023 SAG-AFTRA strike. The production also participated in the San Francisco "Scene in San Francisco Incentive Program" administered by the San Francisco Film Commission.

Dreams is Jessica Chastain's second collaboration with Franco after Memory (2023).

== Release ==
In July 2024, it was announced that the international rights to the film were sold to the Match Factory.

The film was also screened in Open Air Premiere Programme at the 31st Sarajevo Film Festival in August 2025, and in the 'Best of 2025' section of the 20th Rome Film Festival in October 2025.

The film was theatrically released in Mexico on September 11, 2025 by Imagem Films, under the title Dreams: Sueños. It was released in the United States on February 27, 2026.

== Reception ==
=== Critical response ===
On the review aggregator website Rotten Tomatoes, 50% of 86 critics' reviews are positive, with an average rating of 5.5/10. The website's consensus reads: "Anchored by intense performances and charged intimacy, Dreams is a chilly yet compelling two-hander whose messy imperfections ultimately deepen its quietly tragic impact." Metacritic, which uses a weighted average, assigned the film a score of 61 out of 100, based on 23 critics, indicating "generally favorable" reviews.

Jessica Chastain's performance was particularly noted for playing against-type and praised for "tackling a role few stars would have the courage to touch." Justin Chang, in a review for NPR, referred to her as "one of our most fearless actors" and that "she gives herself over, chillingly, to the role of Jennifer, a monstrous manipulator and exploiter of someone she claims to love." Ryan Lattanzio of IndieWire graded the film an A− and lauded Chastain for giving a "daring performance" and "her riskiest in some time." Peter Debrudge of Variety commended the film for delivering "a provocative social critique with an extra-sharp sting in the tail." Peter Bradshaw of The Guardian awarded the film four stars out of five, calling it a "chilly, angrily intense and deeply pessimistic tale of erotic obsession." David Rooney of The Hollywood Reporter praised it a "scalding study of love and privilege" and noticed how "Chastain excels at portraying a woman accustomed to getting whatever she wants."

On the other hand, the film received a negative review from Stephanie Bunbury of Deadline Hollywood writing, "As a heartbreaker, Dreams is flat and entirely affectless."

=== Accolades ===
Award	Date of ceremony	Category	Recipient	Result	Ref.
Berlin International Film Festival	23 February 2025	Golden Bear	Dreams	Nominated	
