= John Lam =

Boston Ballet dancer

- Born: 1984
- Education: Canada's National Ballet School
- Occupation: Ballet dancer
- Employers: Boston Ballet (2003–2024); Boston Conservatory at Berklee (2024–)

John Lam (born 1984) is a Vietnamese-American principal dancer with the Boston Ballet.

== Early life ==
Lam's parents are Vietnamese refugees, who settled in Marin County city of San Rafael in California and received U.S. citizenship.

With the support of the Performing Stars of Marin, a community center for inner city youth, Lam started dancing at age four. He studied at the Marin Ballet School from 1988 to 2000. When he was 12 or 13 years old, Lam worked under the direction of Mikko Nissinen. After two years, Nissinen moved to Canada, but Lam was too young to follow along.

Two years after Nissinen left the Marin Ballet School, Cynthia Lucas, a principal dancer with the National Ballet of Canada, directed Lam to study and receive professional training at Canada's National Ballet School in Toronto with financial support from the Pierino Ambrosoli Foundation.

Fifteen years later, Nissinen saw Lam perform with the Canada National Ballet School and offered him a job with the Boston Ballet.

== Ballet career ==
Lam joined the Boston Ballet in 2003 as a dancer with BBII and was promoted to corps de ballet in 2004, second soloist in 2006, soloist in 2008, and principal dancer in 2014.

In 2005, Lam competed in the Seoul International Ballet Competition and Helsinki International Ballet Competition, where he placed as a finalist and semifinalist respectively. That same year, he received the Princess Grace Fellowship. On June 6, 2006, Lam was commended by the Board of Supervisors of the County of Marin for his personal and professional achievements.

Lam has also created dance films. He choreographed Boston Ballet's "Dance Is" in support of the National Endowment of the Arts. His dance films, "Movement in Structure" and "SHE/I," have won critical acclaim at international dance film festivals. "SHE/I" was an official selection for the San Francisco Dance Film Festival, Bucharest International Dance Film Festival, and Thessaloniki Cinedance International, as well as a pick for the Portland Dance Film Fest.

Lam has received positive reviews from The Boston Globe.

On May 19, 2024, Lam retired as principal dance dancer at the Boston Ballet. In the fall of 2024, Lam became an associate professor in the Dance Division at the Boston Conservatory at Berklee.

== Personal life ==
Lam has a husband and two sons.
