= Christine Shevchenko =

Ukrainian-American ballet dancer

- Христина Шевченко
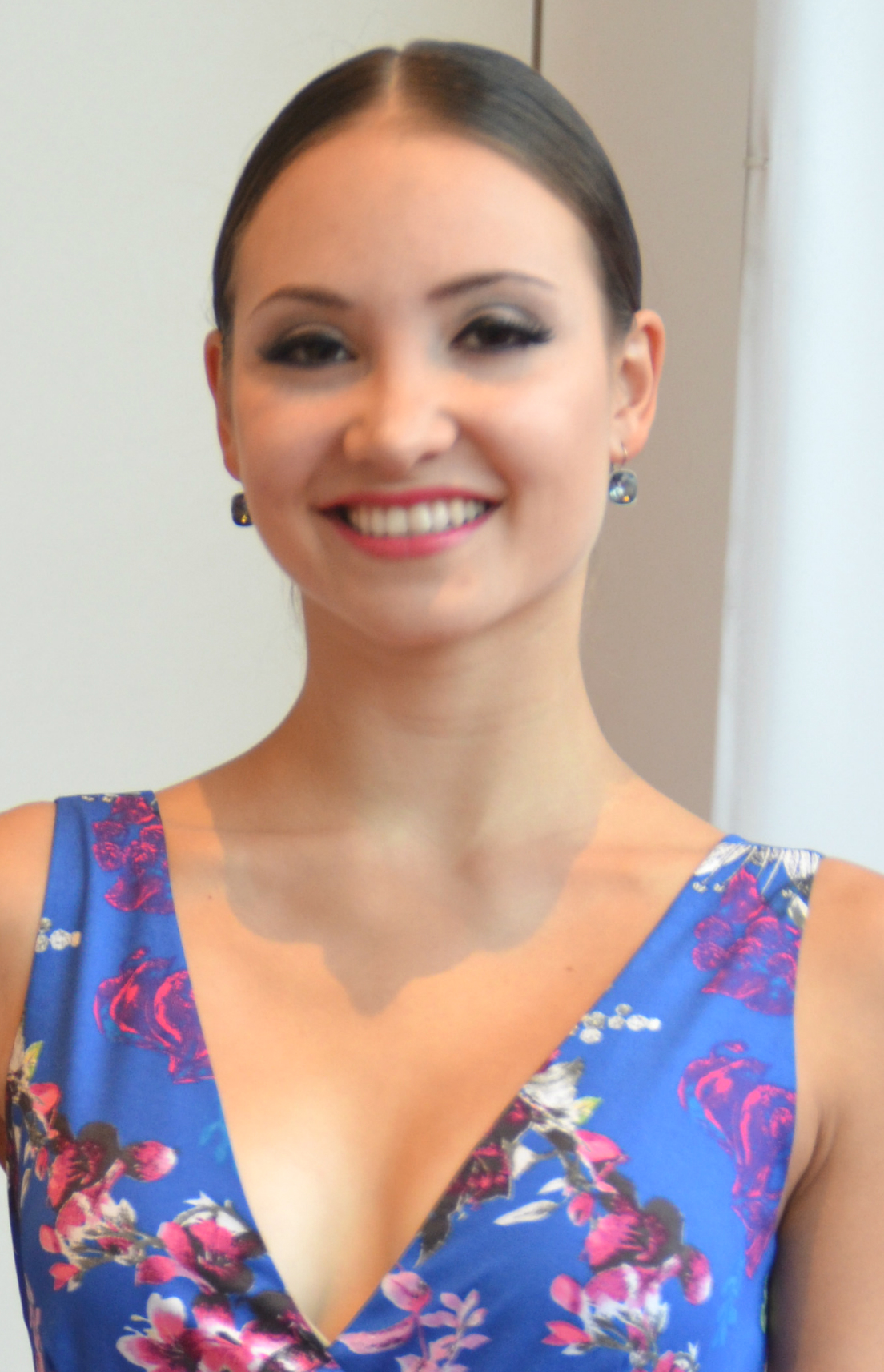
- Shevchenko in September 2014
- Born: 1988 (age 36–37); Odesa, Ukrainian SSR, Soviet Union (now Ukraine)
- Occupation: Ballet dancer
- Years active: 2006-present
- Career
- Current group: American Ballet Theatre
- Website: ChristineShevchenko.com

Christine Shevchenko (Note: Ukrainian: Христина Юріївна Шевченко, romanized: Khrystyna Yuriivna Shevchenko) (born 1988) is a Ukrainian-American ballet dancer. She currently performs as a principal dancer with American Ballet Theatre.

== Early life ==
Born in the Odesa, Ukraine, her father was a gymnast, and her mother was a dancer and actor. At age four, Shevchenko started training in rhythmic gymnastics at an Olympic Reserve School in Odesa, under the direction of Nina Vitrychenko.

When she was eight, her family immigrated to Pennsylvania and enrolled her in The Rock School for Dance Education, under the direction of Bo and Stephanie Spassoff. Shevchenko danced the children's lead (Marie) in Pennsylvania Ballet's The Nutcracker for three years, and was featured in the NBC special, Degas and the Dance.

In 2003, Shevchenko became the youngest recipient of the Princess Grace Award, and she later won several awards at international competitions, including Youth America Grand Prix, USA International Ballet Competition, and Moscow International Ballet Competition.

Shevchenko studied with Lev Assaulyak and Olga Tozyiakova. She also worked with choreographers Fernando Bujones, Benjamin Millepied, Elena Tchernichova, and Vladimir Shoumeikin.

== Career ==
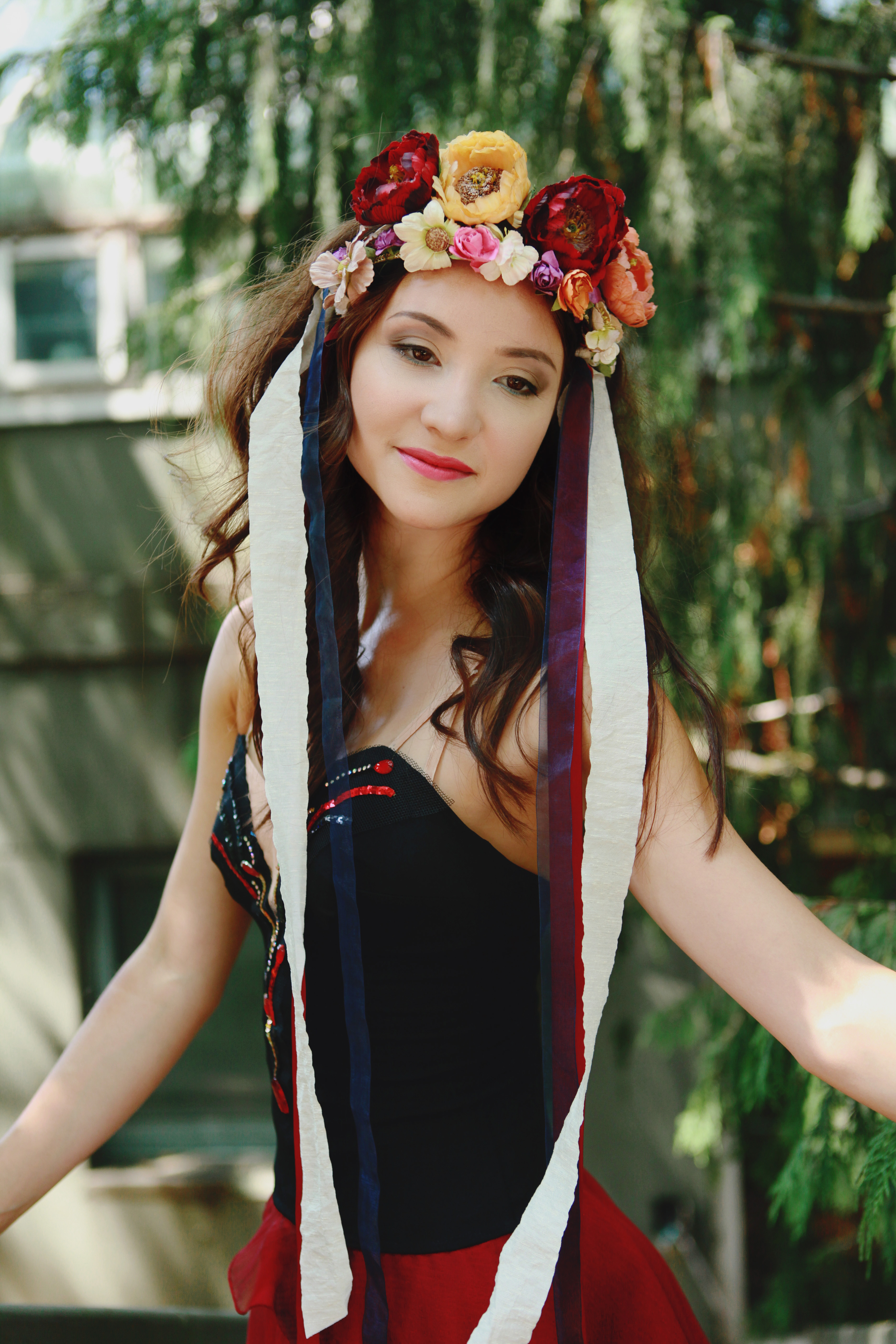
Shevchenko in August 2014

In 2006, Shevchenko joined the American Ballet Theatre Studio Company, where she danced in several classical and contemporary pieces. The following year, she joined the main company as an apprentice and became a full time member of the corps de ballet in 2008. In 2013, when she was still in the corps, Shevchenko replaced an injured Gillian Murphy in Piano Concerto #1. Though she only knew half of the choreography and learned the rest an hour before the show, her performance was praised by critics.

She became a soloist in 2014. In the 2017 Metropolitan Opera House season, Shevchenko debuted as Kitri in Don Quixote, which was her first leading role. The following week, she filled in for an injured dancer as Medora in Le Corsaire, after learning the role during the weekend. She ended the season with her debut in Balanchine's Mozartiana, and was promoted to Principal Dancer later that year. She has since danced other principal roles such as Odette-Odile in Swan Lake, Myrtha in Giselle and Mademoiselle Marianne Chartreuse in Whipped Cream. Shevchenko was coached by Irina Kolpakova at ABT, and had traveled to St. Petersburg to work with Margarita Kullik of Mariinsky Ballet.

== Awards ==
- Princess Grace Award, 2003
- Bronze Medal in the USA International Ballet Competition in Jackson, Mississippi, 2005
- Gold Medal and Title of Laureate at the Moscow International Ballet Competition
- The George Zoritch of Ballet Russe Award for Talent Recognition
- Margaret Moore Dance Award, 2010

== Repertoire ==
Shevchenko's repertoire with the American Ballet Theatre includes:

- Giselle in Giselle
- Odette/Odile in Swan Lake
- Juliet in Romeo and Juliet
- Gamzatti in La Bayadère
- Kitri and Mercedes in Don Quixote
- Medora in Le Corsaire
- Clara the Princess in The Nutcracker
- Firebird in The Firebird
- Callirhoe in Of Love and Rage
- Pierrette in Harlequinade
- Olga in On the Dnieper
- Myrta and Moyna in Giselle'
- Mademoiselle Marianne Chartreuse in Whipped Cream
- The Fairy Summer in Cinderella
- Lead Mazurka/Czardas in Coppélia
- Nanine in Lady of the Camellias
- One of the Nutcracker's Sisters in The Nutcracker
- Diana and Ceres in Sylvia
- Lilac Fairy, Diamond Fairy in Alexei Ratmansky's The Sleeping Beauty
- Fairy of Joy in The Sleeping Beauty
- Polyhymnia in Apollo
- The Dryad Queen and a flower girl in Don Quixote
- Blanche Ingram in Jane Eyre
- An Episode in His Past in Jardin aux Lilas
- Lescaut's Mistress in Manon
- Pas de trois and the Italian Princess in Swan Lake
- Piano Concerto #1
- Raymonda Divertissements
- Symphonic Variations
- Bach Partita
- Mama Elena in Like Water for Chocolate

=== Created roles ===
- Irene in Ghost Catcher
- Songs of Bukovina
- AfterEffect
- Dream within a Dream (deferred)
- Everything Doesn’t Happen at Once
- Praedicere
- Private Light
