= Jeffrey Cirio =

American ballet dancer

- Born: 1991 (age 34–35); Pennsylvania, USA
- Occupation: Ballet Dancer
- Career
- Current group: English National Ballet
- Former groups: Boston Ballet; American Ballet Theatre

Jeffrey Cirio (born 1991) is an American ballet dancer. He joined the Boston Ballet in 2009, and was promoted to principal dancer in 2012. In 2015, he moved to American Ballet Theatre as a soloist, and was promoted to principal dancer the following year. In 2018, he joined the English National Ballet as a principal dancer. He returned to Boston Ballet in the 2022/23 season.

== Early life ==
Cirio was raised in Philadelphia. His father immigrated to the US from the Philippines as a child; his mother is of Irish and German descent. When he was seven, his family moved to Carlisle, Pennsylvania as his sister, Lia, was training at the Central Pennsylvania Youth Ballet. Cirio himself started ballet training there two years later, and was homeschooled. The Cirios later moved to Boston when Lia became an apprentice at the Boston Ballet. Cirio also trained at the Boston Ballet, and Orlando Ballet School. He is a 2009 YoungArts alumnus.

== Career ==
Cirio joined the corps de ballet of Boston Ballet in 2009, and was promoted to Principal at the company in 2012. In 2015, he left Boston Ballet to join American Ballet Theatre as a Soloist. He debuted his first full-length role during the Metropolitan Opera House season as Colas in La fille mal gardée. Cirio's promotion to Principal Dancer at ABT was announced by Kevin McKenzie in July 2016, making him the first Filipino-American male principal in the company's history.

In 2018, Cirio joined the English National Ballet as a lead principal dancer, after spending four months with the company as a guest artist.

In 2022, it was announced that Cirio would return to Boston Ballet in the 2022-23 season but would make guest appearances in May prior to his official return.

Cirio and his sister, Lia, also a Principal Dancer at Boston Ballet, established an artistic collective called Cirio Collective in 2015.

== Selected repertoire ==
Cirio's repertoire with the Boston Ballet, American Ballet Theatre and English National Ballet includes:

- Ballo della Regina
- Solor and the Bronze Idol in La Bayadère
- The Prince in Cinderella (Ashton version)
- Prince Guillaume and Benjamin in Cinderella (Wheeldon version)
- Chroma
- Franz in Coppélia
- Conrad, Ali, the Slave and Lankendem in Le Corsaire
- Basilio in Don Quixote
- Études
- A Sailor in Fancy Free
- Colas in La fille mal gardée
- Melancholic in The Four Temperaments
- The peasant pas de deux in Giselle
- Hilarion in Akram Khan’s Giselle
- Harlequinade (Balanchine version)
- Rubies and Diamond from Jewels
- Des Grieux and Lescaut in Manon
- Oberon and Puck in A Midsummer Night's Dream
- The Nephew/Prince in The Nutcracker (Eagling version)
- The Nutcracker, Cavalier, Snow King and Russian Lead in The Nutcracker (Nissinen version)
- Chinese Dance and Russian Dance in The Nutcracker (Ratmansky version)
- Lensky in Onegin
- Mercutio and Benvolio in Romeo and Juliet (Cranko version)
- Mercutio in Romeo and Juliet (MacMillan version)
- Romeo in Romeo and Juliet (Nureyev version)
- Prince Désiré, Fairy Cavalier and Bluebird in The Sleeping Beauty
- Messenger of Death in Song of the Earth
- Prince Siegfried and Bennoin Swan Lake
- James in La Sylphide
- Eros in Sylvia
- Symphonic Variations
- The Third Movement in Symphony in C
- Theme and Variations
- The Boy in Whipped Cream

=== Created roles ===
- After You
- Her Notes
- Playlist (Track 1, 2)
- Torvald in Nora

== Awards ==
Awards:

- Junior Gold Medal YAGP (2006)
- Bronze Medal, USA Int’l Ballet Competition (2006)
- Silver Medal, Seoul Int’l Dance Competition (2008)
- Gold Medal, Helsinki International Ballet Competition (2009)
- Senior Grand Prix YAGP (2009)
- NFAA Silver Level Award (2009)
- Princess Grace Fellowship (2009)
- UK National Dance Award Nomination (2013)
- Benois de la Danse Nomination (2017)
- UK National Dance Award Best Male Dancer (2023)
