= Romeo and Juliet (Prokofiev) =

1935 ballet by Sergei Prokofiev

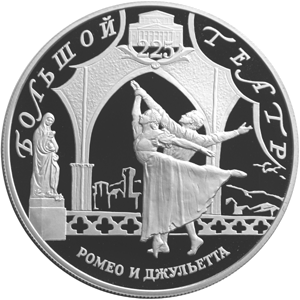
- Commemorative coin depicting a scene from the ballet
- Choreographer: Ivo Váňa-Psota
- Music: Sergei Prokofiev
- Libretto: Adrian Piotrovsky, Sergei Radlov, Sergei Prokofiev, Leonid Lavrovsky
- Based on: Romeo and Juliet
- Premiere: 1938; Mahen Theatre, Brno
- Original ballet company: Ballet of the National Theatre, Brno
- Characters: Ivo Váňa-Psota as Romeo; Zora Šemberová as Juliet
- Genre: Drambalet

Romeo and Juliet (Russian: Ромео и Джульетта, romanized: Romeo i Dzhulyetta), Op. 64, is a ballet by Sergei Prokofiev based on William Shakespeare's play Romeo and Juliet. First composed in 1935, it was substantially revised for its Soviet premiere in early 1940. Prokofiev made from the ballet three orchestral suites and a suite for solo piano.

== Background and premiere ==
Based on a synopsis created by Adrian Piotrovsky (who first suggested the subject to Prokofiev) and Sergey Radlov, the ballet was composed by Prokofiev in September 1935 to their scenario which followed the precepts of "drambalet" (dramatised ballet, officially promoted at the Kirov Ballet to replace works based primarily on choreographic display and innovation). Following Radlov's acrimonious resignation from the Kirov in June 1934, a new agreement was signed with the Bolshoi Theatre in Moscow on the understanding that Piotrovsky would remain involved.

However, the ballet's original happy ending (contrary to Shakespeare) provoked controversy among Soviet cultural officials. The ballet's production was then postponed indefinitely when the staff of the Bolshoi was overhauled at the behest of the chairman of the Committee on Arts Affairs, Platon Kerzhentsev. The ballet's failure to be produced in the Soviet Union until 1940 may also have been a result of consequences in the performing arts following Pravda's denunciation of Dmitri Shostakovich in 1936, as well as other "degenerate modernists" including Piotrovsky. The conductor Yuri Fayer met with Prokofiev frequently during the writing of the music, and he strongly urged the composer to revert to the traditional ending. Fayer went on to conduct the first performance of the ballet at the Bolshoi Theatre.

Suites of the ballet music were heard in Moscow and the United States, but the full ballet premiered in the Mahen Theatre, Brno (then in Czechoslovakia, now in the Czech Republic), on 30 December 1938. This version was a single-act production with music mainly from the first two suites. Prokofiev was not able to attend the premiere due to his status of outbound restriction.

The history of the creation of the ballet was recited by the composer Sergei Prokofiev himself:

At the end of December (of 1934) I returned to Leningrad specifically for the negotiations with the Kirov Theatre. I expressed my wish to find a lyrical scenario for a ballet… We started recalling the scenarios: Piotrovsky named "Pelléas and Méllisande", "Tristan and Isolde", "Romeo and Juliet". I immediately "clung" onto the latter – it would be impossible to find a better one! It was arranged that Piotrovsky, Radlov and I (S.P.) would be making a libretto. It was decided to engage as a producer Rostislav Zakharov – a former student of Radlov… However, we didn't conclude a contract with the Kirov Theatre… I arrived in Moscow, and Golovanov, the then chief conductor of the Bolshoi Theatre said that if this was about "Romeo" the Bolshoi theatre would immediately conclude a contract with me. The contract was signed in the summer of 1935. The theatre gave me the opportunity to work on the ballet in "Polenovo" – the holiday home of the Bolshoi theatre, where I managed to almost finish the ballet using themes composed in the spring. An audition of the ballet took place in the theatre. It had no success. The ballet was not put on the stage at that time… Yet it was staged in the Kirov Theatre in 1939 (1940). R. Zakharov dropped out after the ballet had been rejected by the Bolshoi theatre. Lavrovsky, on the other hand, during the staging of the ballet in Leningrad, added quite a lot to what had been composed before him. Later I decided to include him in the co-authors of the libretto.

== 1940 Kirov production ==
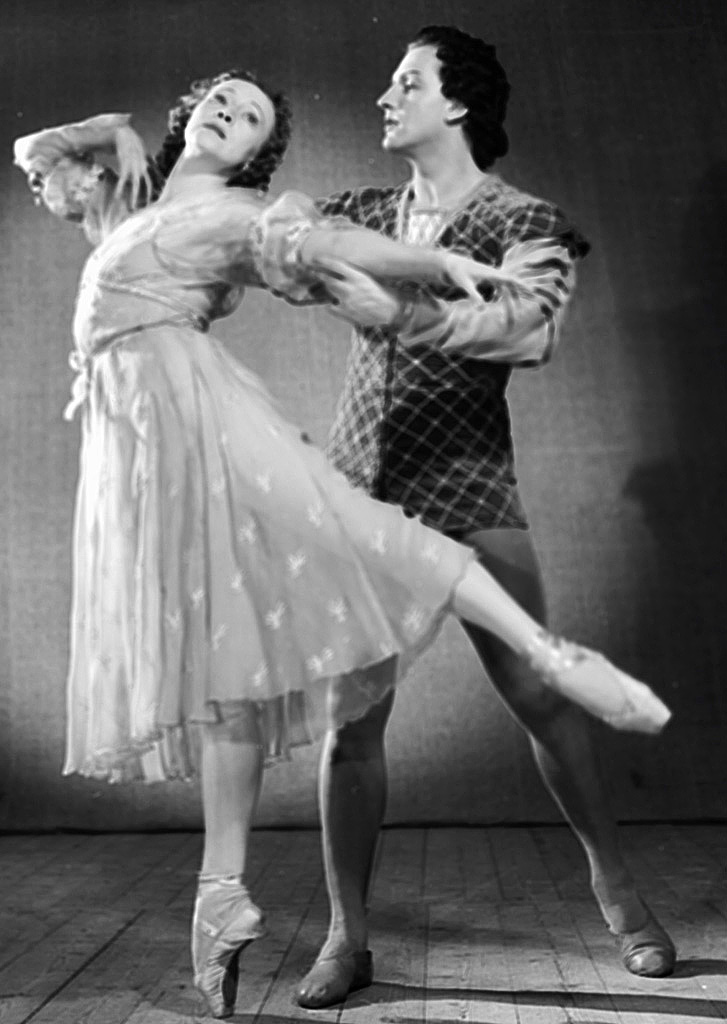
Galina Ulanova and Yuri Zhdanov in the ballet

It is better known today from the significantly revised version that was first presented at the Kirov Theatre (now Mariinsky Theatre) in Leningrad (now Saint Petersburg) on 11 January 1940, with choreography by Leonid Lavrovsky and with Galina Ulanova and Konstantin Sergeyev in the leading roles. Despite the objections of Prokofiev, Lavrovsky significantly changed the score of the ballet. This production received international acclaim and was awarded the Stalin Prize.

In 1955, Mosfilm made the film version of this production with Galina Ulanova as Juliet and Yuri Zhdanov as Romeo. This film won the Best Lyrical Film and nominated as Palme d'Or in the 1955 Cannes Film Festival.

Original Cast

- Galina Ulanova, Juliet
- Konstantin Sergeyev, Romeo
- Robert Gerbek, Tybalt
- Andrei Lopukhov, Mercutio

== Revivals and other productions ==
In 1955, Frederick Ashton choreographed a production of Romeo and Juliet for the Royal Danish Ballet.

In 1962, John Cranko's choreography of Romeo and Juliet for the Stuttgart Ballet helped the company achieve a worldwide reputation. It had its American premiere in 1969.

In 1965, choreographer Sir Kenneth MacMillan's version for the Royal Ballet premiered at the Royal Opera House, Covent Garden. Margot Fonteyn and Rudolf Nureyev danced the title roles. Fonteyn, considered to be near retirement, embarked upon a rejuvenated career with a partnership with Nureyev. Also in 1965, Oleg Vinogradov staged a version in Russia while serving as assistant ballet master to Pyotr Gusev.

In 1971, John Neumeier, partly inspired by John Cranko, created another version of the ballet in Frankfurt. In 1974, Neumeier's Romeo and Juliet premiered in Hamburg as his first full-length ballet with the company.

In 1977, Rudolf Nureyev created a new version of Romeo and Juliet for the London Festival Ballet, today's English National Ballet. He performed the lead role of Romeo with British ballerinas Eva Evdokimova and Patricia Ruanne creating the role of Juliet. As a partnership, they toured the production internationally. Eva Evdokimova danced the leading role Juliet in London and Paris, and it continues to be a popular ballet in the ENB repertoire, with its most recent revival in 2010 staged by Patricia Ruanne and Frederic Jahn of the original 1977 cast. This production was also staged by La Scala Theater Ballet in 1980 and Paris Opera Ballet in 1984 and has been a renowned performance in the POB repertoire.

In 1979, Yuri Grigorovich created a new version for the Bolshoi, "which did away with most of the stage properties and stylized the action into an all-danced text." This was revived in 2010 and remains in the Bolshoi repertory.

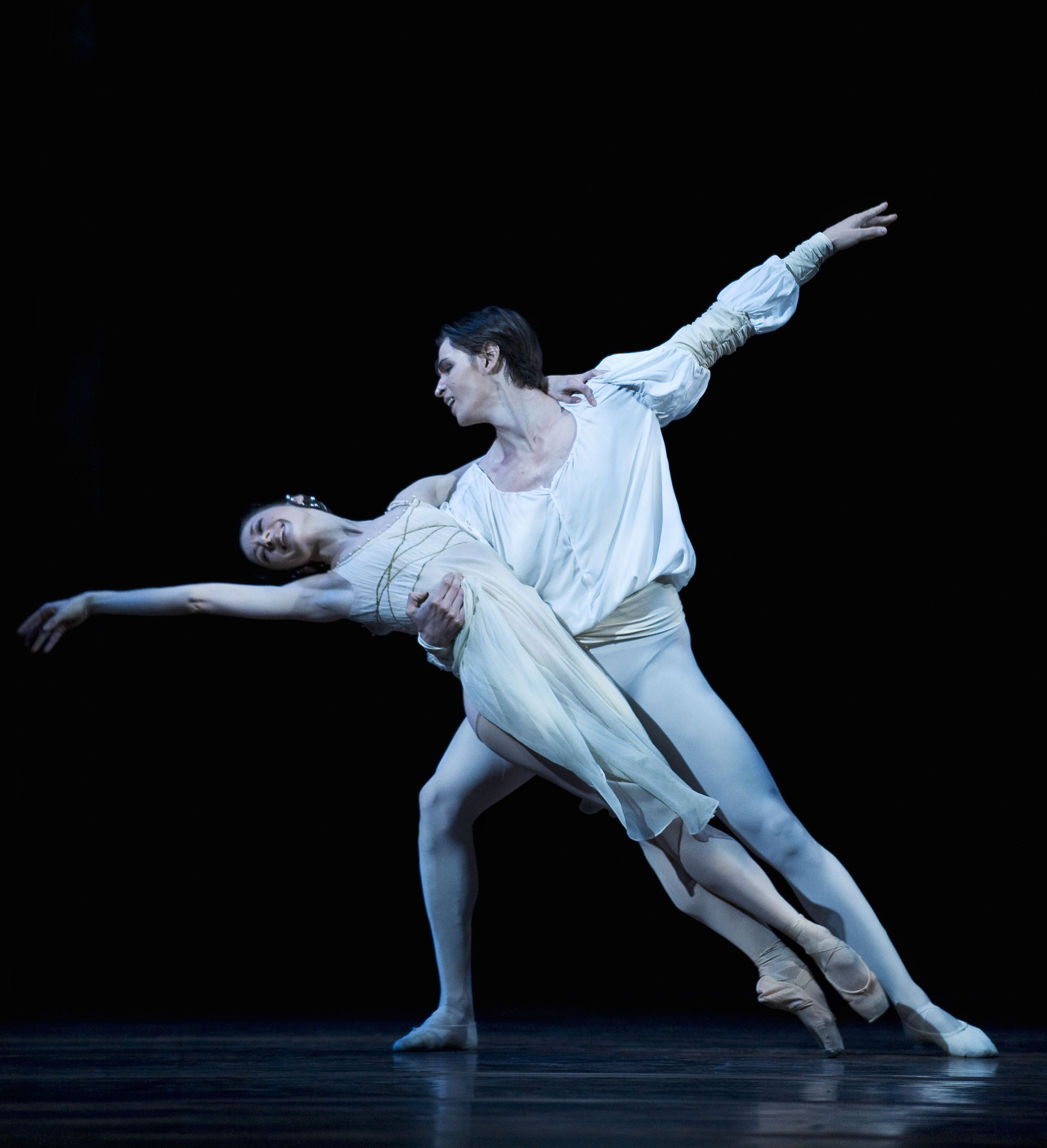
A 2010 production at the Royal Swedish Opera

In 1985, choreographer László Seregi's production premiered at the Hungarian National Ballet, Budapest.

In 1990, director Armondo Linus Acosta used Prokofiev's score, performed by the London Symphony Orchestra, to create a motion picture adaptation of Shakespeare's Romeo and Juliet. Acosta's Romeo.Juliet was conceived as a film-in-concert with a live orchestra performing the soundtrack, and was performed as such to international acclaim with by conductors such as André Previn, Barry Wordsworth, and Nicholas Cleobury.

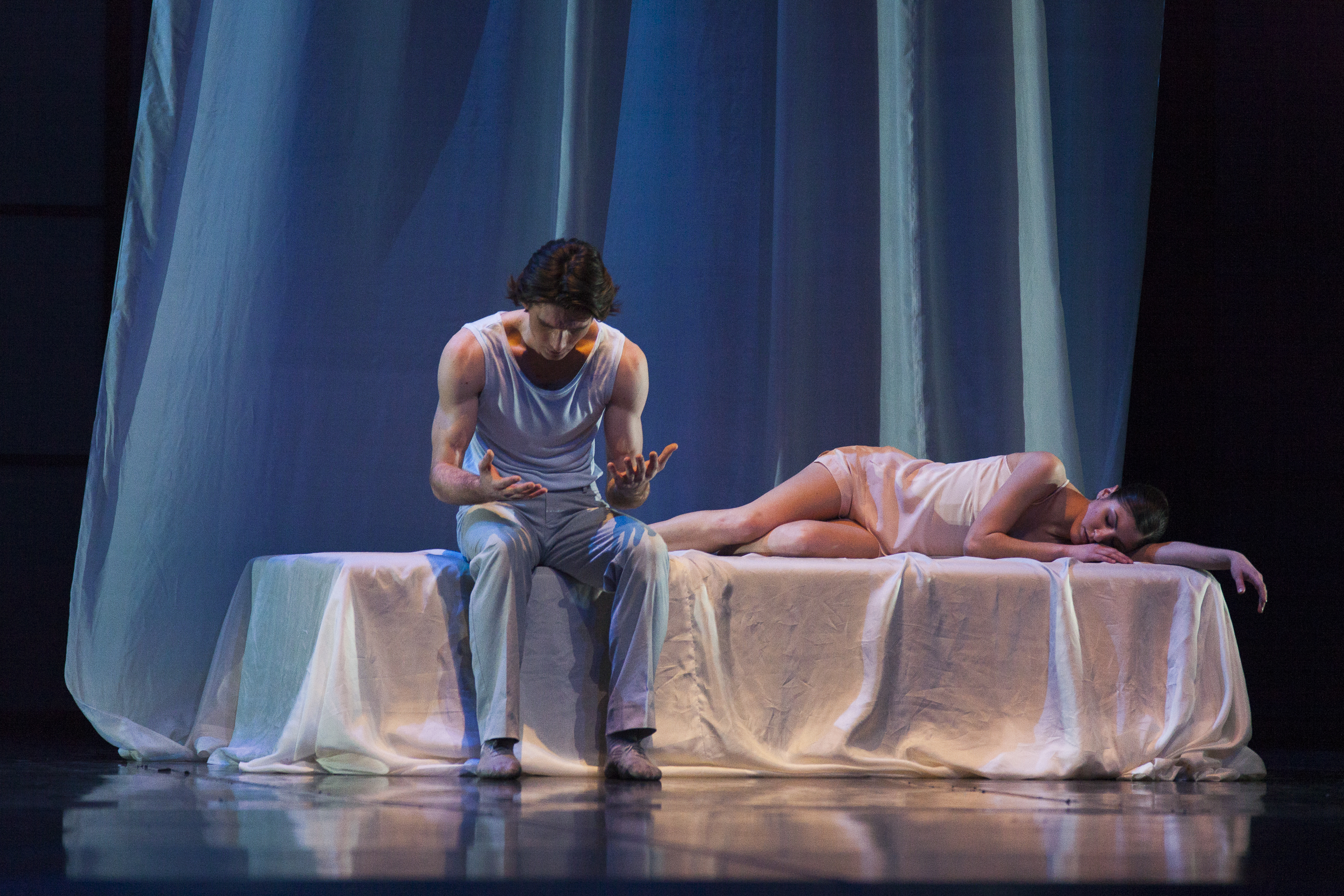
A 2014 Krzysztof Pastor's production at the Polish National Ballet, dancers: Vladimir Yaroshenko and Maria Żuk

In 1991, Christopher Gable directed his own production for the Northern Ballet Theatre. It was choreographed by Massimo Moricone and featured William Walker as Romeo and Jayne Regan as Juliet.

In 1996, choreographer Jean-Christophe Maillot premiered his version of Roméo et Juliette at Les Ballets de Monte Carlo. Taking formal inspiration from the episodic character of Sergei Prokofiev's classic score, Maillot structured the action in a manner akin to cinematic narrative. Rather than focusing on themes of political-social opposition between the two feuding clans, this Romeo and Juliet highlights the dualities and ambiguities of adolescence.

Peter Martins choreographed the 2007 ballet Romeo + Juliet set to Prokofiev's music for the New York City Ballet.

In 2008, Krzysztof Pastor presented his version by the Scottish Ballet at the Edinburgh Festival Theatre. The Polish premiere of this version was by the Polish National Ballet in Warsaw, and the United States premiere was by the Joffrey Ballet in 2014.

On July 4, 2008, with the approval of the Prokofiev family and permission from the Russian State Archive, the original Prokofiev score was given its world premiere. Musicologist Simon Morrison, author of The People's Artist: Prokofiev's Soviet Years, unearthed the original materials in the Moscow archives, obtained permissions, and reconstructed the entire score. Mark Morris created the choreography for the production. The Mark Morris Dance Group premiered the work at the Fisher Center for the Performing Arts at Bard College in New York state. The production subsequently began a year-long tour to include Berkeley, Norfolk, London, New York, and Chicago.

In 2011, the National Ballet of Canada premiered a new choreography of Romeo and Juliet by Alexei Ratmansky in Toronto, with plans to take it on tour in Western Canada in early 2012.

Also in 2011, Graeme Murphy created his version of Romeo and Juliet for The Australian Ballet.

In 2015, Stanton Welch premiered his version of Romeo and Juliet for Houston Ballet.

In 2019 at the Curve Theatre, Leicester Matthew Bourne choreographed an alternative adaptation of Romeo and Juliet set in a mental hospital called 'Verona Institute'. It was filmed with Cordelia Braithwaite as Juliet, Paris Fitzpatrick as Romeo and Dan Wright as Tybalt.

== Score ==
=== Instrumentation ===
In addition to a somewhat standard instrumentation, the ballet also requires the use of the tenor saxophone. This voice adds a unique sound to the orchestra as it is used both in solo and as part of the ensemble. Prokofiev also used the cornet, viola d'amore and mandolins in the ballet, adding an Italianate flavor to the music.

Full instrumentation is as follows:

Woodwinds
1 piccolo
2 flutes
2 oboes
1 cor anglais
2 clarinets (2nd doubling on E♭ clarinet)
1 bass clarinet
1 tenor saxophone
2 bassoons
1 contrabassoon

Brass
6 horns
3 trumpets
1 cornet
3 trombones
1 tuba

Percussion
Timpani

Snare drum
Xylophone
Triangle
Woodblock
Maracas
Glockenspiel
Tambourine
Chime in A
Cymbals
Bass drum

Keyboards
Piano
Celesta
Organ

Plucked strings
2 mandolins
2 harps

Bowed strings
Viola d'amore (or solo viola)
First and second violins
Violas
Violoncellos
Double basses

The score is published by Muzyka and the Russian State Publisher.

=== Structure ===
List of acts, scenes and musical numbers.

Scene	No.	Original title in Russian	English title	Tempo indication	Notes
Act 1
	1	Вступление	Introduction	Andante assai	
Scene 1	2	Ромео	Romeo	Andante	
Scene 1	3	Улица просыпается	The Street Awakens	Allegretto	
Scene 1	4	Утренний танец	Morning Dance	Allegro	
Scene 1	5	Ссора	The Quarrel	Allegro brusco	
Scene 1	6	Бой	The Fight	Presto	
Scene 1	7	Приказ герцога	The Prince Gives His Order	Andante	a.k.a. The Duke's Command. Introduction of Montagues and Capulets in Suite No. 2
Scene 1	8	Интерлюдия	Interlude	Andante pomposo (L'istesso tempo)	
Scene 2	9	Приготовление к балу (Джульетта и Кормилица)	Preparing for the Ball (Juliet and the Nurse)	Andante assai. Scherzando	a.k.a. At the Capulets' (Preparations for the Ball)
Scene 2	10	Джульетта-Девочка	Juliet as a Young Girl	Vivace	a.k.a. The Young Juliet
Scene 2	11	Съезд гостей (Менуэт)	Arrival of the Guests (Minuet)	Assai moderato	
Scene 2	12	Маски (Ромео, Меркуцио и Бенволио в масках)	Masks (Romeo, Mercutio and Benvolio in Masks)	Andante marciale	
Scene 2	13	Танец рыцарей	Dance of the Knights	Allegro pesante	The main part of Montagues and Capulets in Suite No. 2 Famous Work of 20th-century classical music
Scene 2	14	Вариация Джульетты	Juliet's Variation	Moderato (quasi Allegretto)	
Scene 2	15	Меркуцио	Mercutio	Allegro giocoso	
Scene 2	16	Мадригал	Madrigal	Andante tenero	
Scene 2	17	Тибальд узнает Ромео	Tybalt Recognizes Romeo	Allegro	
Scene 2	18	Гавот (Разъезд гостей)	Gavotte (Departure of the Guests)	Allegro	Gavotte (movement III) from "Classical" Symphony, Op. 25
Scene 2	19	Сцена у балкона	Balcony Scene	Larghetto	
Scene 2	20	Вариация Ромео	Romeo's Variation	Allegretto amoroso	
Scene 2	21	Любовный танец	Love Dance	Andante	
Act 2
Scene 3	22	Народный танец	Folk Dance	Allegro giocoso	
Scene 3	23	Ромео и Меркуцио	Romeo and Mercutio	Andante tenero	
Scene 3	24	Танец пяти пар	Dance of the Five Couples	Vivo	Dance in Suite No. 2
Scene 3	25	Танец с мандолинами	Dance with Mandolins	Vivace	
Scene 3	26	Кормилица	The Nurse	Adagio scherzoso	
Scene 3	27	Кормилица передает Ромео записку от Джульетты	The Nurse Gives Romeo the Note from Juliet	Vivace	a.k.a. The Nurse and Romeo
Scene 4	28	Ромео у патера Лоренцо	Romeo at Friar Laurence's	Andante espressivo	
Scene 4	29	Джульетта у патера Лоренцо	Juliet at Friar Laurence's	Lento	
Scene 5	30	Народное веселье продолжается	The People Continue to Make Merry	Vivo	a.k.a. Public Merrymaking
Scene 5	31	Снова народный танец	The Folk Dance Again	Allegro giocoso	a.k.a. Further Public Festivities (Снова народный праздник)
Scene 5	32	Встреча Тибальда с Меркуцио	Tybalt Meets Mercutio	Moderato	a.k.a. Meeting of Tybalt and Mercutio
Scene 5	33	Тибальд бьётся с Меркуцио	Tybalt and Mercutio Fight	Precipitato	a.k.a. The Duel
Scene 5	34	Меркуцио умирает	Death of Mercutio	Moderato	
Scene 5	35	Ромео решает мстить за смерть Меркуцио	Romeo Decides to Avenge Mercutio's Death	Andante. Animato	a.k.a. Death of Tybalt
Scene 5	36	Финал второго действия	Finale of Act II	Adagio dramatico	
Act 3
	37	Вступление	Introduction	Andante	reprise of No. 7
Scene 6	38	Ромео и Джульетта (Спальня Джульетты)	Romeo and Juliet (Juliet's bedroom)	Lento	
Scene 6	39	Прощание перед разлукой	Farewell before Parting	Andante	a.k.a. Romeo Bids Juliet Farewell, or The Last Farewell
Scene 6	40	Кормилица	The Nurse	Andante assai	
Scene 6	41	Джульетта отказывается выйти за Париса	Juliet Refuses to Marry Paris	Vivace	
Scene 6	42	Джульетта одна	Juliet Alone	Adagio	
Scene 6	43	Интерлюдия	Interlude	Adagio	
Scene 7	44	У Лоренцо	At Friar Laurence's	Andante	a.k.a. At Friar Laurence's Cell
Scene 7	45	Интерлюдия	Interlude	L'istesso tempo	
Scene 8	46	Снова у Джульетты	Again in Juliet's Bedroom	Moderato tranquillo	
Scene 8	47	Джульетта одна	Juliet Alone	Andante	
Scene 8	48	Утренняя серенада	Morning Serenade	Andante giocoso	a.k.a. Aubade
Scene 8	49	Танец девушек с лилиями	Dance of the Girls with Lilies	Andante con eleganza	
Scene 8	50	У постели Джульетты	At Juliet's Bedside	Andante assai	
Act 4: Epilogue
Scene 9	51	Похороны Джульетты	Juliet's Funeral	Adagio funebre	Romeo at the Tomb of Juliet in Suite No. 2
Scene 9	52	Смерть Джульетты	Death of Juliet	Adagio (meno mosso del tempo precendente)	

== Orchestral suites taken from the work ==
Note that for compositional reasons the titles of the numbers in all three suites do not always correspond exactly to those in the complete ballet.

=== Suite No. 1 from Romeo and Juliet, Op. 64bis ===
1. Folk Dance
2. Scene (the Street Awakens)
3. Madrigal
4. Minuet (the Arrival of the Guests)
5. Masks
6. Romeo and Juliet (Balcony Scene and Love Dance)
7. Death of Tybalt (Containing parts from No. 33, 6, 35 & 36 from the complete score)

=== Suite No. 2 from Romeo and Juliet, Op. 64ter ===
1. Montagues and Capulets (The Prince Gives His Order and Dance of the Knights)
2. Juliet as a Young Girl
3. Friar Laurence (Romeo at Friar Laurence's)
4. Dance (Dance of the Five Couples)
5. Romeo and Juliet Before Parting
6. Dance of the Girls with Lilies
7. Romeo at Juliet's Tomb (Juliet's Grave)

=== Suite No. 3 from Romeo and Juliet, Op. 101 ===
1. Romeo at the Fountain (Introduction & Romeo)
2. Morning Dance
3. Juliet (Juliet's Variation & Juliet at Friar Laurence's)
4. The Nurse (Preparing for the Ball & The Nurse)
5. Aubade (Morning serenade)
6. The Death of Juliet

== Ten Pieces for Piano, Op. 75 ==
Prokofiev reduced selected music from the ballet as Romeo and Juliet: Ten Pieces for Piano, Op. 75, which were performed in 1936 and 1937.

Montaigus et Capulets

1. Folk Dance
2. Scene: The Street Awakens
3. Minuet: Arrival of the Guests
4. Juliet as a Young Girl
5. Masquers
6. Montagues and Capulets
7. Friar Laurence
8. Mercutio
9. Dance of the Girls with Lilies
10. Romeo and Juliet before Parting

== Recordings ==
Sergei Prokofiev himself made the first recording of music from the ballet, with the Moscow Philharmonic Orchestra in 1938. Since then, there have been recordings of the full score, as well as various excerpts such as the orchestral suites the composer prepared. Leopold Stokowski conducted the NBC Symphony Orchestra in an early stereo recording in 1954. Gennady Rozhdestvensky and the Symphony Orchestra of the Bolshoi Theatre recorded the full score in 1959. André Previn with the London Symphony Orchestra and Lorin Maazel with the Cleveland Orchestra both made recordings of the complete score in 1973; these landmark recordings meant wider Western audiences could hear the full score on disc for the first time, and have served as references since their release. Erich Leinsdorf conducted the Los Angeles Philharmonic Orchestra for an audiophile recording of excerpts on the Sheffield Lab label released in 1978. Michael Tilson Thomas conducted the San Francisco Symphony Orchestra in 1995, in selections from the score, for RCA Victor. Georg Solti conducted the Chicago Symphony Orchestra in a recording coupled with the Classical Symphony. Valery Gergiev made two recordings, with the Kirov Orchestra in 1990 and with the London Symphony Orchestra in 2011.
