= Derek Dunn =

American principal ballet dancer

Derek Dunn (born 1995) is a principal dancer with the Boston Ballet.

== Biography ==
Dunn was raised in Glen Burnie, Maryland and began dancing at the Edna Lee Dance Studio, following in the steps of his older sister. He attended the Kirov Academy of Ballet's summer intensive program, then from 2009 to 2012, trained at the Rock School for Dance Education in Philadelphia.

Before joining a professional company, Dunn earned multiple awards, including the Youth America Grand Prix (2008), the Junior Gold Medal (2010), the Senior Gold Medal at the Youth America Grand Prix (2012), and the Junior Bronze Medal in USA International Ballet Competition (2010).

Dunn joined the Houston Ballet in 2012. In 2015, he sustained injuries to both feet, forcing him to pause his dance career for six months. Despite his injuries, he was promoted to demi-soloist in 2016. During his time with the Houston Ballet, Dunn received many positive reviews.

He was named one of Dance magazine's "25 to Watch" in 2014 and an Outstanding Male Dancer in Dance Europe for the 2013–2014 season. He was also on the cover of October/November 2016 issue of Pointe magazine.

Dunn joined the Boston Ballet as a soloist in 2017 and was promoted to principal dancer in 2018. He has received many positive reviews of his performances since joining.

In 2021, Dunn danced at the Festival South Road Trip, as well as the USA International Ballet Competition Showcase.
