= Boston Ballet =

Boston-based ballet company

General information
- Name: Boston Ballet
- Year founded: 1963; 63 years ago
- Founder: E. Virginia Williams
- Principal venue: Boston Opera House
- Website: www.bostonballet.org/home.aspx

Senior staff
- Executive director: Ming Min Hui
- Director: Mikko Nissinen
- Assistant director: Russell Kaiser
- Company manager: Veronica Horne

Artistic staff
- Music director: Mischa Santora
- Resident choreographers: Jorma Elo; Stephen Galloway; Helen Pickett

Other
- Official school: Boston Ballet School

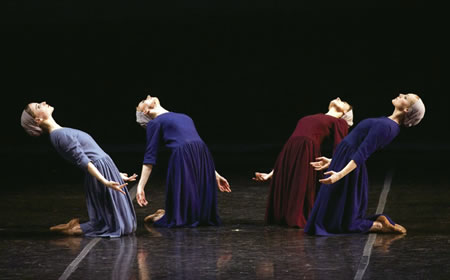
Boston Ballet dancers perform Antony Tudor's Dark Elegies (1937) under the direction of Tudor expert Donald Mahler in 2008.

The Boston Ballet is an American professional classical ballet company based in Boston, Massachusetts. It was founded in 1963 by E. Virginia Williams and Sydney Leonard, and was the first professional repertory ballet company in New England. It has been led by Violette Verdy (1980–1984), Bruce Marks (1985–1997), and Anna-Marie Holmes (1997–2000). Mikko Nissinen has been artistic director of Boston Ballet since 2001. Nissinen leads the company in partnership with Executive Director Ming Min Hui.

== History ==
=== 1956-1979 ===
In 1956, E. Virginia Williams moved the ballet school she founded from a studio in Back Bay to 186 Massachusetts Avenue, across from the Loew's State Theatre in Boston. At this point in time, the school offered classes starting at a children's level all the way to a professional division.

In 1958, out of her Boston School of Ballet (which was sometimes called The New England School of Ballet), E. Virginia Williams formed a small dance group named The New England Civic Ballet. The group primarily performed at small local festivals and venues around New England.

From 1958 to 1962, the New England Civic Ballet performed regionally, dancing various pieces such as a three-act Nutcracker, Les Sylphides, and repertory works by E. Virginia Williams, Sydney Leonard, Lev Ianov, and Jean Paige.

In August 1962, the New England Civic Ballet performed as part of the 30th year of the Jacob's Pillow Dance Festival. At this point, the New England Civic Ballet was considered a semi-professional company and began calling themselves the Boston Ballet.

In December 1963, The Boston Globe reported that a Ford Foundation grant of US$144,000 to the Boston Ballet School had given birth to Boston's first and only professional ballet company. The total Ford Grant was $7,756,000, the largest private subsidy made to a single art form at the time. In part, based on the recommendations of George Balanchine and W. McNeil Lowry, the grant provided for the formation of several professional ballet companies. This included the Boston Ballet, Pennsylvania Ballet, Cincinnati Ballet, and Washington Ballet. Balanchine was a strong supporter of this initiative. He was Boston Ballet's artistic advisor for several years and gave the new company several of his works.

=== 1979–1989 ===
In 1979, Boston Ballet opened the Nervi Festival in Italy, and in 1980 was the first American dance company to perform in the People's Republic of China. The company made its London premiere in 1981, with a full-length production of Swan Lake. In 1983, Boston Ballet presented Don Quixote on Broadway with Rudolf Nureyev as a guest artist, after touring the United States, Mexico, France, and Italy. Boston Ballet performed Mark Morris's Mort Subite at the PepsiCo Festival in Purchase, New York in 1986, and performed at the BESSIE Dance and Performance award ceremony at New York City Center in 1987.

=== 1990–1999 ===
Boston Ballet made its debut at the Kennedy Center in Washington DC, in January 1990. Thay May Natalia Dudinskaya, Konstantin Sergeyev, and assistant artistic director Anna-Marie Holmes staged a new production of Swan Lake with Boston Ballet dancers performing with dancers from the Kirov Ballet and the Bolshoi Ballet. In 1991, Boston Ballet moved into their current headquarters at 19 Clarendon Street in Boston's South End, after touring throughout Spain in July.

=== 2000–2010 ===
In 2005, the company added James Kudelka's Cinderella, George Balanchine's Coppélia, Jewels, Midsummer Night's Dream, the American premiere of Jirí Kylián's Black and White, John Cranko's Onegin, The Taming of the Shrew, and Romeo and Juliet to its repertoire. Boston Ballet additionally appointed Jorma Elo as its resident choreographer. Elo created at least six works for the company, including Plan to B, Brake the Eyes, and Le Sacre du Printemps. During the summer of 2007, the company completed a second tour of Spain. Boston Ballet's touring included appearances at the Guggenheim Museum's Works & Process series, the "Fall for Dance" festivals held at New York City Center and Orange County Performing Arts Center, and performances at the Spoleto Festival USA and the Kennedy Center's Ballet Across America series in the spring of 2008. Boston Ballet embarked on its first tour to Seoul, South Korea in the summer of 2008, presenting works by George Balanchine, Twyla Tharp, and Christopher Wheeldon not previously performed there. In the fall of 2009, Boston Ballet's sole performance venue became the Boston Opera House.

=== Since 2010 ===
Boston Ballet maintains a repertoire that includes classics such as Marius Petipa's The Sleeping Beauty and August Bournonville's La Sylphide, contemporary versions of classics such as Mikko Nissinen's Swan Lake and John Cranko's Romeo and Juliet, and works by contemporary choreographers including William Forsythe, Jirí Kylián, Mark Morris, David Dawson, Val Caniparoli, Christopher Wheeldon, and Helen Pickett. Over 35 performances employ the entire company and more than 250 Boston Ballet School students who join in the production every year. Boston Ballet's The Nutcracker has been performed annually since 1963.

== Boston Ballet II ==
Boston Ballet has no official apprentice company. However, they have a secondary company, Boston Ballet II (BBII). For some Boston Ballet II dancers, their work in BBII is their first paid dancer experience. BBII members usually practice and perform with the main company, and also perform in their own productions. Boston Ballet II is currently under the direction of Joan Boada.

== Boston Ballet Graduate Program ==
Under the direction of Kathleen Mitchell, Boston Ballet’s Graduate Program is widely regarded as one of the most prestigious and exclusive pre-professional ballet programs in the United States. This one year program is primarily for dancers who've completed their high school education and graduated from other ballet programs.

== Boston Ballet School ==
The Boston Ballet School (BBS) continues to operate as part of Boston Ballet. The program was officially incorporated as Boston Ballet School in 1979. The studio serves male and female ballet students starting at age 3. The BBS is the largest dance school in North America, providing professional dance education at locations in Boston, Newton, and specialized training at Walnut Hill School For Performing Arts.

== Boston Ballet Studios ==
Clarendon Street Boston Ballet School Headquarters: The main studio location of the Boston Ballet School. The Clarendon Street Studio also acts as the Headquarters for the school and the greater company, including administrative offices and the marketing team. The Clarendon Street Studio is also home to the Pre-Professional Program.

Boston Ballet Newton Studio: Originally based in Norwell, Massachusetts, the newer Newton studio opened its doors in August 2017.

Boston Ballet Brookline Studio: The Brookline Ballet School, founded by former Boston Ballet principal dancers, will be operated by Boston Ballet starting in July 2025.

Boston Ballet Marblehead Studio: Located on the second floor of the Lynch Van Otterloo YMCA in Marblehead Massachusetts, the third studio was opened in 2009. It was the smallest of the three studios and closed in 2021.

== Specialized Programs ==
Pre-Professional Program at Boston Ballet School: The pre-professional program at the Boston Ballet is a steppingstone to the professional company. It is not the same as Boston Ballet II. It is competitive and accepts about 80 students a year. Students worldwide participate in this program and train directly under the head of the Boston Ballet School and the professional company members. The program is delivered at and in partnership with Walnut Hill School for the Arts for students in grades 9–12. Pre-Professional students occasionally perform in Boston Ballet company performances.

Boston Ballet School and Walnut Hill School For Performing Arts: Walnut Hill Academy for the Performing Arts will utilize Boston Ballet School's teachers and students while offering access to Walnut Hill School's academic curriculum, housing, and facilities. The new partnership focused exclusively on Boston Ballet School's pre-professional division, currently made up of 81 students - the school's smallest branch.

Citydance: A community program established in 1991 which introduces third-grade students from Boston Public Schools to a free introduction to dance and movement. Citydance faculty travel to Boston Public School classrooms to host an introductory dance workshop. After this introduction, select students are invited to the Clarendon Street Boston Ballet Studios for additional dance and ballet training. Students who choose to continue their training at the Boston Ballet following Citydance receive free tuition for the remainder of their tenure at the Boston Ballet School.

== Dancers ==
=== Principal Dancers ===
Dancer	Nationality	Training	Joined Boston Ballet	Promoted to Principal	Other Companies
Ji Young Chae	South Korea	Seoul Arts High School; Korea National University of Arts	2013	2018	Washington Ballet
Jeffrey Cirio	United States	Central Pennsylvania Youth Ballet; Boston Ballet School; Orlando Ballet School	2009, 2022	2012, N/A, Rejoined as Principal	American Ballet Theatre; English National Ballet
Lia Cirio	United States	Swarthmore Ballet Theatre; Central Pennsylvania Youth Ballet	2004	2010	
Paul Craig	United States	Conservatory of Dance; Virginia School of the Arts; Boston Ballet School	2008	2017	
Derek Dunn	United States	Edna Lee Dance Studio; The Rock School for Dance Education	2017	2018	Houston Ballet
Chyrstyn Mariah Fentroy	United States	Joffrey Ballet School	2017	2022	Dance Theatre of Harlem
Seo Hye Han	South Korea	Korea National University of Arts	2012	2016	Universal Ballet Company
Viktorina Kapitonova	Russia	Kazan Ballet School; Bolshoi Academy	2018	N/A, Joined as Principal	Kazan Ballet; Stanislavsky Theatre Ballet; Ballett Zurich
Lasha Khozashvili	Georgia	Vakhtang Chabukiani Tbilisi Ballet Art State School	2010	N/A, Joined as Principal	Tbilisi Z. Paliashvili Opera and Ballet State Theatre; State Ballet of Georgia; Samsun Opera and Ballet Theater
Chisako Oga	United States	San Francisco Ballet School	2019	2023	
Yue Shi	China	Liaoning Ballet School Royal Winnipeg Ballet School	2023	N/A, Joined as Principal	Royal Winnipeg Ballet
Patrick Yocum	United States	Pittsburgh Ballet Theatre School	2011	2017	

=== Soloists ===
Name	Nationality	Training	Jointed Boston Ballet	Promoted to Soloist
María Álvarez	Spain	Mariemma Royal Conservatory; Carmina Ocean Dance School	2012	2022
Daniel R. Durrett	United States	Dr. Lyrica Joy Ministries Ballet School; UpTown Arts; Cincinnati Ballet Otto M. Budig Academy	2017	2024
Evelina Godunova	Latvia	Royal Ballet School Moscow State Academy of Choreography Riga Ballet Academy	2024	N/A, Joined as Soloist
Lauren Herfindahl	United States	Boston Ballet School	2013	2024
Sun Woo Lee	South Korea	Korea National Institute for the Gifted Arts; Yewon School; Seoul Arts High School; Korea National University of Arts	2018	2023
Sangmin Lee	South Korea	Korea National University of Arts	2019	2024
Ángel García Molinero	Spain	Real Conservatorio de Danza Mariemma	2021	N/A, Joined as Soloist
Lawrence Rines	United States	School of American Ballet; The Rock School for Dance Education	2011	2019
Haley Schwan	United States	Kirov Academy of Ballet; Vaganova Ballet Academy	2017	2022

=== Second Soloists ===
Name	Nationality	Training	Joined Boston Ballet	Promoted to Second Soloist
Kaitlyn Casey	United States	School of American Ballet	2023	2024
Tyson Ali Clark	United States	Mary Flynn Murphy Dance Studio Gold School with Project Moves Dance Company Boston Ballet School	2019	2023
Louise Hautefeuille	United States	Menlo Park Academy of Dance Boston Ballet School	2019	2023
Sage Humphries	United States	Dance Academy SoCal Dmitri Kulev Classical Ballet Academy	2017	2023
Chenxin Lu	China	Beijing Dance Academy Royal Winnipeg Ballet School	2023	N/A, Joined as Second Soloist
Courtney Nitting	United States	New Jersey School of Ballet School of American Ballet	2023	2024
Daniel Rubin	United States	Kirov Academy of Ballet Moscow State Academy of Choreography	2022	2023

=== Corps de Ballet (Artists) ===
- Emily Aston
- Sebastian Bondar
- Finn Duggan
- Daniela Fabelo
- Henry Griffin
- Sage Humphries
- Graham Johns
- Seokjoo Kim
- Alexa Malone
- Abigail Merlis
- Wesley Miller
- Isaac Mueller
- Kyra Muttilainen
- Alexander Nicolosi
- Deanna Pearson
- Alainah Grace Reidy
- Sydney Santo Domingo
- Gearoid Solan
- Sam Stampleman
- Emma Topalova
- Schuyler Wijsen
- Spencer Wetherington
- Sydney Williams
- Alexis Workowski
- Samuel Yuan

=== Boston Ballet II ===
- Natalia Cardona
- Zoe Cartier
- Ethan Collins
- Michael Dadlez
- Aubrey Daniels
- Alberto Gil Vicente
- Kallie Green
- Sophia Jones
- Bogyeong Kim
- Pavel Kulev
- Louis Millard
- Alexander Mockrish
