= Romeo and Juliet (Nureyev) =

1977 ballet by Rudolf Nureyev

- Choreographer: Rudolf Nureyev
- Music: Sergei Prokofiev
- Premiere: 1977; London Coliseum, London
- Original ballet company: London Festival Ballet
- Characters: Patricia Ruanne and Rudolf Nureyev
- Created for: Patricia Ruanne and Rudolf Nureyev
- Genre: Ballet
- Type: Neoclassical

Rudolf Nureyev's production of Sergei Prokofiev's Romeo and Juliet premiered at the London Coliseum on 2 June 1977.

== Background and premiere ==
Rudolf Nureyev had previously danced as the leading role in Kenneth MacMillan's production of the ballet at the Royal Ballet, Covent Garden in 1965. In 1977, Nureyev left the Royal Ballet and created his own production of the ballet for London Festival Ballet to celebrate the Queen's Silver Jubilee. This production premiered at the London Coliseum on 2 June 1977, with the British ballerina Patricia Ruanne as Juliet and Rudolf as Romeo. This production is still in the English National Ballet's repertoire.

This production was later staged for the La Scala Theatre Ballet and the first night took place on 20 December 1980, with Carla Fracci as Juliet and the choreographer as Romeo. This production was filmed in 1983 and broadcast in Italy and Britain, with the participation of Margot Fonteyn as Lady Capulet.

In 1984, this production was introduced to Paris Opera Ballet with Monique Loudières and Patrick Dupond as the leading roles. The production was filmed and released in DVD format in 1995, featuring Loudières as Juliet and Manuel Legris as Romeo.

== Original cast ==
- Patricia Ruanne, Juliet
- Rudolph Nureyev, Romeo
- Nicholas Johnson, Mercutio
- Jonas Kåge, Benvolio
- Frederic Jahn-Werner, Tybalt
- Elisabeth Anderton, Nurse

== 1980 Milan cast ==
- Carla Fracci, Juliet
- Rudolph Nureyev, Romeo
- Paolo Podini, Mercutio
- Angelo Moretto, Benvolio
- Tiziano Mietto, Tybalt
- Maddalena Campa, Nurse

== 1984 Paris cast ==
- Monique Loudières, Juliet
- Patrick Dupond, Romeo
- Cyril Atanassoff, Tybalt
- Jean-Pierre Franchetti, Mercutio
- Laurent Hilaire, Paris
- Yvette Chauviré, Lady Capulet

== 1995 Paris (DVD) cast ==
- Monique Loudières, Juliet
- Manuel Legris, Romeo
- Charles Jude, Tybalt
- Lionel Delanoë, Mercutio
- Wilfried Romoli, Benvolio
- José Martínez, Paris
- Karin Averty, Rosaline
- Clotilde Vayer, Lady Capulet
- Olivier Patey, Lord Capulet
- Annie Carbonnel, Nurse

== Sources ==
- Childs, Peter. and Storry, Michael. Encyclopedia of Contemporary British Culture. Routledge, 2013.
- Snodgrass, Mary Ellen. The Encyclopedia of World Ballet. Rowman & Littlefield, 2015.
