= Bruce Marks (dancer) =

- Born: January 23, 1937 (age 89); New York City, United States
- Genres: Classical ballet, modern dance
- Occupations: Dancer, artistic director, choreographer, coach, judge, consultant, teacher
- Years active: 1949–present
- Website: www.brucemarks.com

Bruce Marks is an American dancer, performing both in ballet and modern dance. He continues to work as a choreographer, coach and teacher and is a tireless advocate for the art form.

== Early years ==
Bruce Marks, born in New York City, began his training at age 13 at the New York High School of Performing Arts, and at 14, created the role of the young boy in Pearl Lang's Ironic Rite. (Later Rites ) Through his teen years, he performed with Pearl Lang's company, creating roles in Lang's , And Joy Is My Witness, Nightflight, Apasionado, Black Marigolds, and Shira. Marks continued his studies at Brandeis University(1954–1955) and The Juilliard School(1955–1956), where he studied with Margaret Craske, Alfredo Corvino, Mattlyn Gavers, and Antony Tudor—who became his mentor.

== The Metropolitan Opera ==
At Tudor's suggestion in 1956, Marks joined the Metropolitan Opera Ballet. He was soon singled out for principal roles. After appearing in a ballet evening in 1959 at The Met dancing Adam in choreographer John Butler's In The Beginning, Marks was invited to appear at the Spoleto Festival of Two Worlds as a member of a company organized by Herbert Ross and John Butler.

Metropolitan Opera, Marks danced principal roles in:

- Aida
- Alcestis
- Carmen
- La Giaconda
- The Gypsy Baron
- Lucia de Lammermoor

—AND--

- Rigoletto
- La Forza del Destino
- Les contes d'Hoffmann
- La Traviata
- Eugene Onegin
- Faust
- Die Meistersinger von Nurnberg
- Orfeo ed Euridice
- Samson et Dalila
- Tannhauser

== American Ballet Theatre ==
In 1961, again at the suggestion of Tudor, Marks joined The American Ballet Theatre. He soon became one of the most respected and versatile of ABT's male contingent, excelling in both modern and classical ballets, and was quickly promoted to principal dancer. He created one of the leading roles in the American premiere of Harald Lander’s Etudes as well as the leading role of Prince Siegfried in ABT's first full-length production of Swan Lake. In 1968 Marks performed the role of Hilarion in the American Ballet Theatre's film of Giselle.

Roles performed by Marks at American Ballet Theatre:

- Theme and Variations
- Grand Pas Glazanov
- Billy the Kid
- Pillar of Fire
- Dark Elegies
- Gala Performance
- Romeo and Juliet
- Etudes
- Miss Julie
- Moon Reindeer
- Sargasso
- Gaité Parisienne
- Aleko
- A Rose for Miss Emily
- Tally Ho
- Concerto
- Swan Lake
- The Sleeping Beauty
- At Midnight
- Balladen Der Liebe
- Helen of Troy
- Coppelia
- Electra
- Jardin Aux Lilas
- The Moor's Pavane
- Petrouchka
- Ricecare
- The Taming of the Shrew
- Tchaikovsky Pas de Deux

== The Royal Danish Ballet ==
After twice appearing as guest artist with the company, Marks was invited to become the first American principal dancer of the Royal Danish Ballet. He made his debut as such in May, 1971 at the Danish Ballet and Music Festival dancing Paul Taylor's Aureole. It was the first time a modern trained artist had done the work in Copenhagen and he received rave reviews. The next evening he danced the role of James in the 19th century Danish classic, La Sylphide, by August Bournonville and astounded with his versatility.

Marks ended his performing career in 1976 in Denmark taking on his first artistic directorship with Ballet West in Salt Lake City, Utah.

Marks danced principal roles at the Royal Danish Ballet in:

- La Sylphide
- Napoli
- Far From Denmark
- Aureole
- Prism
- Trio
- Rigoletto
- The Triumph of Death
- Romeo and Juliet
- The Nutcracker
- Miss Julie
- Moon Reindeer
- A Touch of the Poet
- The Moor's Pavane et al.
- Winter's Court

== As guest artist ==
Marks has danced as guest artist with:

- London Festival Ballet
- Grand Theatre de Geneve
- Les Grands Ballets Canadiens de Montreal
- The Royal Swedish Ballet
- The Royal Danish Ballet
- Teatro Municipal Firenze, Maggio Musicale

== At Ballet West ==
By 1976, Marks became Co-Artistic Director of Ballet West at the invitation of its founder, Willam Christensen. Following Christensen's retirement in 1978, Marks was named artistic director. The company flourished under Marks's direction, and his distinctive stamp was made with the addition of new works to the company's repertory from Bournonville and Balanchine to the 19th century master works as well as modern dance classics.

In 1985, Marks and Toni Lander recreated and staged the “lost” 1855 Bournonville ballet, Abdallah for Ballet West, to great acclaim. The production had its East Coast premiere at Washington's Kennedy Center, on May 1, 1985, and the critics raved. "Abdallah is a triumph!” cheered the Boston Globe. The Wall Street Journal declared, “That it communicates such broad meanings and does so, moreover, with such effortless charm, is the great achievement of Bruce Marks.” In 1986, Marks staged Abdallah for the Royal Danish Ballet, the company for whom the work was originally created, and in 1990, he brought the production to Boston Ballet.

== At Boston Ballet ==
Marks then assumed the position of artistic director of Boston Ballet When he was appointed artistic director and CEO (combining the jobs was a first in the world of ballet), he eradicated the company's debt which was then 50% of the budget. During his tenure, the company's annual budget and attendance tripled. Under his dynamic leadership, Boston Ballet achieved international acclaim and built a reputation for performing authentic versions of the classics and for encouraging daring modern works. In 1991, in Boston's South End, Marks opened a new facility that continues to be one of the country's leading centers for dance and dance education. His time in Boston had many highlights: an unprecedented American/Soviet production of Swan Lake; the company's 1990 debut at Washington's Kennedy Center; a 1991 five-city tour of Spain; and in 1993, to inaugurate its 30th season, a highly acclaimed version of The Sleeping Beauty. Following a second Kennedy Center engagement in March 1994, Boston Ballet became the first American company to perform John Cranko’s Onegin. In 1995, Marks added Cranko's The Taming of the Shrew to the company's repertory, followed in 1997 by Michael Corder’s award-winning Cinderella. Marks mounted the world's most popular production of The Nutcracker. Continuing to add to Boston's repertory, he brought the oldest existing version of Coppélia from The Royal Danish Ballet plus a traditional Russian production of Giselle, staged by Anna-Marie Holmes and coached by Natalia Dudinskaya of the Kirov Ballet.

Encouraging young American choreographers was one of Marks's major thrusts as Director. As such, he commissioned works by Danny Buraczeski, Bill T. Jones, Ralph Lemon, Monica Levy, Susan Marshall, Bebe Miller, Daniel Pelzig and Lila York. He also added works by Merce Cunningham and Twyla Tharp.

In July 1998, Marks stepped down from his post at Boston Ballet to become Artistic Director Emeritus.

== As chairman of the jury: USA International Ballet Competition ==
In 1989, Marks was chosen to succeed the late Robert Joffrey as Chairman of the International Jury of the USA International Ballet Competition held in Jackson Mississippi, a position he held through 2010. He served as the American judge at the international competitions in Helsinki, Nagoya, Moscow, and Seoul as well as at the 1994 Prix de Lausanne in Switzerland and chairman of the 2012 Jury, 4th Beijing International Invitational Competition for Dance Schools.

== As arts advocate ==
Marks is a founding member of Dance/USA, a national service organization that represents professional dance companies and from 1990 to 1992 was Dance/USA's chairman. 1990–92, he was board chairman of the American Arts Alliance. He was also Artist Fellow of the Aspen Institute for Humanistic Studies. He served on the Inter-Arts Panel of the NEA and also chaired the International Performing Arts Touring Committee. He has been a member of and chaired the National Endowment for the Arts Dance Panel, and was a member of the NEA's International Advisory Panel. In 1997, Marks was appointed to the US-USSR Commission on Theatre and Dance Studies of the American Council of Learned Societies, and to the Theatre Union of the USSR for 1988–89, a commission set up to foster Soviet/American cooperation in the fields of dance history, theory, criticism and practice.

== As educator ==
Marks has been a pioneer in innovative dance education and outreach programs including Boston Ballet's precedent-setting Center for Dance Education's City Dance, a tuition-free ballet training program for urban public school students. Marks has taught and coached worldwide including The Beijing Dance Academy, China, International Ballet Seminar, Copenhagen, University of the Arts, Seoul, Korea et al. Marks also has created a landmark training program for artistic directors.

== As choreographer ==
Marks has created over thirty ballets including Clockwise, Dichterliebe, Asylum, Inner Space, Don Juan, Songs of the Valley, Lark Ascending, Sanctus, Abdallah, Pipe Dreams, Don Quixote, Continuo I and Continuo II, Inscape, Shake It Up, Tales of Hans Christian Andersen, Straight from the Heart, The Parting, Fragments, La Fille Mal Gardée (with Samantha Dunster), Greenfields of America, Old Demons, et al.

Marks has coached and staged works for American Ballet Theatre, The Royal Danish Ballet, National Ballet of Canada, NBA Ballet Tokyo, Boston Ballet, Ballet West, Kansas City Ballet, Nevada Ballet Theater, Louisville Ballet, [Charleston Ballet Theater, Fort Worth Ballet, Introdans and others.

Marks has been the artistic director of the Boston Ballet (1985-1997) and the Orlando Ballet (2006-2008).

== As consultant ==
In 1998, Marks created ArtsVenture, Inc., a consulting firm dedicated to passing along to others the vast knowledge and insights that he has accumulated in the field. Through ArtsVenture, he has served as a consultant to the British Arts Council, Canada Council for the Arts, as well as dance companies in America such as the Fort Worth Ballet (later known as Texas Ballet Theater), José Limón Dance Company, and Louisville Ballet.

== Personal life ==
In 1966, Marks married Danish ballerina Toni Lander with whom he had three sons—Erik Antony, Adam Christopher, and Kenneth Rikard. After Lander died in 1985, Marks married painter, theater-designer, and writer, Paul Fiumedoro. The two reside in south Florida where Marks is currently at work on his autobiography.

== Honors and awards ==
- 1991 Sonja Loew Award, for Excellence in the Arts
- 1994 National Governors' Association, for Distinguished Service to the Arts
- 1995 Capezio Dance Award for Achievement in Dance and Contributions toward Public Awareness of Dance in America
- 1997 Dance Magazine Award
- 1998 Dance/USA Honors
- 2005 May - Juilliard Centennial Medal
- 2008 Dance Masters of America Annual Award
- 2008 Vasterling Award, for Artistic Vision and Excellence

== Honorary degrees: doctor of fine arts ==
- Wheaton College
- Franklin Pierce College
- Northeastern University
- University of Massachusetts Amherst
- Juilliard
- The Boston Conservatory
