= Toni Lander =

Danish ballerina

Toni Lander née Pihl Petersen (1931–1985) was a Danish ballerina who specialized in the ballets of August Bournonville. After becoming a solo dancer with the Royal Danish Ballet in 1950, she was a guest dancer with the Original Ballet Russe in 1951. She was then engaged by the Paris Opera Ballet until 1954. Lander also appeared with the London Festival Ballet in the late 1950s and with the American Ballet Theatre in the 1960s. After a few years back in Denmark in the early 1970s, in 1976 she joined the Ballet West in Salt Lake City. After a short illness, she died there of cancer in May 1985.

== Early life ==
Born in Gentofte on 19 June 1931, Toni Pihl Petersen was the daughter of Knud Åge Carl Pihl Petersen (1905–1972) and Agnes Margrethe Andersen (1907–1950). When she was six, she began training under Leif Ørnberg (1904–1977), who immediately recognized her talents. In 1939, as an eight-year-old, she was admitted to the Royal Danish Ballet School where she advanced quickly. Thanks to her height, she was able to join the ballet corps while still studying. The ballet sequences of Bournonville were the basis for the ballet school but as she became an aspirant, Harald Lander took a personal interest in her training, introducing her to Russian ballet.

== Career ==
When she was 15, she make her début as Sophie in Vilhelm Christian Holm's Livjægerne paa Amager (The Lifeguards on Amager). A year later, she gained wide acclaim, dancing Margot Lander's difficult part in Étude. In 1951 Lander rewrote the part for her. Ten years later, under the name Études, it became her most notable part for the rest of her career.

In 1950, she became a solo dancer. On 15 April of that year, she married Harald Lander (1905–1971) but her relationship with him was to bring her major problems. In 1951, he was dismissed from the Royal Danish Ballet for misusing his position. She followed him to Paris where he became artistic director of the Paris Opera Ballet but in order to avoid accusations of favoritism, she continued to train in Russian ballet under Ljubov Egorova, Nora Kiss and Olga Preobrajenska. For a few months, she danced with the Ballets Russes but moved to London in 1954 where she appeared as a replacement at the London Festival Ballet, taking on the role of Odette in Swan Lake at short notice. She performed so well that she was engaged by the company for the next five years.

She travelled widely with the Festival Ballet, performing both Russian ballet and Bournonville roles. In 1957, she appeared at the Tivoli Concert Hall in Copenhagen where she danced in Études and Swan Lake. She was honoured with the Order of the Dannebrog. She returned to the Falconer Centre in Copenhagen in 1959, where both she and her husband were widely acclaimed, preparing the way for Etudes at the Royal Danish Theatre.

In 1960, she moved to New York for an engagement with American Ballet Theatre. She appeared in a more extensive repertoire, including Miss Julie and The Moon Reindeer by the Swedish choreographer Birgit Culberg, as well as Antony Tudor's Jardin aux Lilas. When Flemming Flindt became artistic director of the Royal Danish Ballet in 1966, he invited Toni Lander to appear as a guest dancer in 1967. She demonstrated her wide experience by dancing the pas de deux from Don Quixote, Eliza in Bournonville's Konservatoriet and the title role from Miss Julie, all in one evening.

After she and Harald Lander had divorced in 1964, in January 1966 she married the American dancer Bruce Marks with whom she had three children: Eric Anthony (1968), Adam Christopher (1970), Kenneth Rikard (1974). Her last assignment with the American Ballet was in the première of José Limón's The Moor's Pavane. In 1971, she returned to Denmark after an international career lasting 20 years, quite exceptional for a Danish ballerina. In parallel with appearances in The Moor's Pavane (1971–1976), she taught at the ballet school while Marks performed as a solo dancer.

In 1976, Marks was invited to become artistic director of Ballet West in Salt Lake City, and Lander once again followed her husband, becoming head of training there. While with the Ballet West, she presented Études at the Paris Opera, Budapest Opera and the National Ballet of Amsterdam. She collaborated with Flemming Ryberg on presenting a new version of Bournonville's Abdallah which premièred in February 1985. In 1983, she had divorced Marks and was ready to accept an invitation to become the first female artistic director for the Royal Danish Ballet. She was prevented from doing so by a rapidly developing cancer which led to her death in Salt Lake City on 19 May 1985, aged only 53.
