= Tina LeBlanc =

American ballet dancer, teacher and ballet master

- Born: October 17, 1966 (age 58); Erie, Pennsylvania, U.S.
- Occupations: ballet dancer; teacher; ballet master
- Spouse: Marco Jerkunica (m. 1988)
- Career
- Current group: San Francisco Ballet
- Former groups: Joffrey Ballet

Tina LeBlanc (born October 17, 1966) is an American ballet dancer, teacher and ballet master. She joined the Joffrey Ballet in 1984. In 1992, she joined the San Francisco Ballet as a principal dancer. She retired in 2009, then joined the faculty of the San Francisco Ballet School, before returning to the San Francisco Ballet as a ballet master in 2019.

== Early life and training ==
Tina LeBlanc was born on October 17, 1966, at Erie, Pennsylvania. She has a brother and two sisters, including younger sister Sherri, who later danced with both the New York City Ballet and San Francisco Ballet. In 1967, she moved with her family to Smyrna, Delaware, where she started taking dance classes. In 1975, the family moved to Dillsburg, Pennsylvania, and she continued her ballet training at Marcia Dale Weary Dance School (now Central Pennsylvania Youth Ballet). She decided to be a ballet dancer by age eleven, and started taking fifteen ballet classes a week at age twelve. She wanted to join the American Ballet Theatre due to its classical repertory. When she was fourteen, she attended summer programs at both the American Ballet Theatre and School of American Ballet. The following year, she auditioned for the American Ballet Theatre summer program again, but was rejected as artistic director Mikhail Baryshnikov was not considering recruiting short girls.

== Career ==
After LeBlanc was rejected by the American Ballet Theatre, she performed in a regional festival in York, Pennsylvania, where she was spotted by Joffrey II, the second company of Joffrey Ballet. She joined Joffrey II in 1982, when she was fifteen. Seventeen months later, in 1984, she joined the Joffrey Ballet, directed by Robert Joffrey and Gerald Arpino. At the time, the company was based in New York but toured extensively, and she soon received nationwide attention and critical acclaim. Her repertoire there include Saint-Léon's La Vivandière, Balanchine's Tarantella and Cotillon, as Lise in Ashton's La fille mal gardée, as Juliet in Cranko's Romeo and Juliet, and works by Jiří Kylián. She later noted the company's repertory and working with Robert Joffrey "made me the dancer that I am." In 1988, she won her first Princess Grace Award.

In 1992, she joined the San Francisco Ballet, directed by Helgi Tómasson, as a principal dancer. Her reasons for leaving Joffrey Ballet include Robert Joffrey's death, artistic issue and her husband's desire to leave New York. Having seen the San Francisco Ballet perform in the New York City Center in 1991, she drove to San Francisco to audition for the company when Joffrey Ballet was touring in Los Angeles. She "felt lost" during her first year, and had to learn many ballets to see where she "would shine". She soon became more comfortable there, due to the company's coaching staff. She won her second Princess Grace Award in 1995. At the company, she danced full-length classics such as Swan Lake, The Sleeping Beauty, Giselle, and works by George Balanchine, Agnes de Mille, Antony Tudor, Jerome Robbins, William Forsythe, Mark Morris, Helgi Tómasson, Christopher Wheeldon, Lar Lubovitch and Julia Adam. She was often paired with Gonzalo Garcia, fourteen years her junior.

Starting in 1999, LeBlanc took part in photographer Lucy Gray's long-term photography project alongside fellow San Francisco Ballet principal dancers Katita Waldo and Kristin Long, about their experiences as dancers and mothers. The project lasted fourteen years, and the photographs were published in the 2015 book Balancing Acts: Three Prima Ballerinas Becoming Mothers.

In 2000, she won the Isadora Duncan Dance Award for Individual Performance for her work that entire season with the San Francisco Ballet. The following year, she won the award for Ensemble Performance with colleagues, Waldo, Long, Roman Rykine and Gennadi Nedvigin, for their performances in Forsythe's The Vertiginous Thrill of Exactitude.

In 2007, LeBlanc tore her anterior cruciate ligament and underwent surgery. Though she planned to retire after the end of the 2008 season, she decided to complete rehab and retire in 2009, after spending 17 years at the company and when she was 42. In her final performance, she danced Balanchine's Tchaikovsky Pas de Deux and Theme and Variations, Lubovitch's My Funny Valentine and Tómasson's Sonata. Garcia, who had since joined the New York City Ballet, returned to dance Tchaikovsky Pas de Deux with her. Following her retirement from dance, she joined the San Francisco Ballet School faculty. In 2019, she left to return to the San Francisco Ballet as a ballet master.

== Personal life ==
In 1986, LeBlanc met Marco Jerkunica. They married in 1988, and have two sons, born in 1997 and 2003. She noted she had always wanted to have children during her dance career, "because I want to have a long career, and I don't want to wait until I'm 40 to have kids."
