= Katita Waldo =

Spanish ballet dancer and ballet master

- Born: Kathryn Cristine Waldo Grey; April 9, 1968 (age 56); Madrid, Spain
- Education: University of North Carolina School of the Arts; Washington Ballet; San Francisco Ballet School
- Occupations: ballet dancer; ballet master
- Spouse: Marshall Crutcher (m. 1989)
- Children: 1
- Career
- Current group: San Francisco Ballet

Katita Waldo (born Kathryn Cristine Waldo Grey; April 9, 1968) is a Spanish ballet dancer and ballet master. She joined the San Francisco Ballet in 1988, was promoted to principal dancer in 1994, and retired from performing in 2010, but remains in the company as a ballet master.

== Early life and training ==
Kathryn Cristine Waldo Grey was born on April 9, 1968, in Madrid. At age five, after her parents took her to see Swan Lake, she was sent to dance classes at Escuela de Danza Classica. While she initially disliked dancing, her parents had already paid for a year, so she had to stay. However, by the end of the year, she found herself enjoying performing and continued her dance training.

In 1979, when Waldo was eleven, she and her family moved to Ithaca, New York, and she continued her training at Ithaca Ballet. She also attended public school between the ages of eleven and twelve, and later recalled she was "demoralized" there. Due to her experience in public school and the desire to have better dance training, she auditioned for the University of North Carolina School of the Arts, which accepted her when she was thirteen and provided a scholarship. Her parents had avoided sending her to the School of American Ballet after learning of hip injuries suffered by students there. However, in her first year at the school, she started developing a tendinitis in her hips, which worsened during the second year and forced her to drop out. She received therapy in New York, covered by an award she received, and returned to school eight months later. In 1984, she started studying at the Washington Ballet, then in 1986, she moved to San Francisco to train at the San Francisco Ballet School.

== Career ==
In 1987, she became an apprentice with the San Francisco Ballet, directed by Helgi Tomasson. The following year, she joined the company as a member of the corps de ballet. She was promoted to soloist in 1990 and principal dancer in 1997. Her repertory include classical ballets, and works by August Bournonville, George Balanchine, Jerome Robbins, Lew Christensen, William Forsythe, Mark Morris, Christopher Wheeldon, Wayne McGregor and Renato Zanella.

In 1999, after photographer Lucy Gray met Waldo and her infant son, Gray then asked Waldo to work on a long-term photography project about her experience as a dancer and mother, which her colleagues Tina LeBlanc and Kristin Long also participated. The project lasted fourteen years, and the photographs were published in the 2015 book Balancing Acts: Three Prima Ballerinas Becoming Mothers.

In 2002, Waldo and fellow San Francisco Ballet dancers Long, LeBlanc, Roman Rykine and Gennadi Nedvigin won the Isadora Duncan Dance Award for Ensemble Performance, for their performances in Forsythe's The Vertiginous Thrill of Exactitude. She won the award again the following year with Joanna Berman and Julie Diana for Robbins' Dances at a Gathering.

In 2004, 2006 and 2007, Waldo worked as ballet master and choreographer's assistant for Christopher Wheeldon and Yuri Posskhov at the Bolshoi Ballet, including for Possokhov's Magrittomania. Then, in the San Francisco Ballet New Works Festival in 2008, she served as choreographer's assistant to Wheeldon again, while also helping company artistic director Helgi Tomasson.

Waldo retired from performing in 2010, after a 22-year career, making her the last dancer hired or promoted by Tomasson in late 1980s to retire. While retiring dancers usually don't create roles in new ballets, Waldo was cast in Zanella's Underskin as dancer Vitor Luiz needed a partner. Therefore, Underskin became part of her farewell program. She remains in the San Francisco Ballet as a ballet master. In 2013, she briefly came out of retirement to perform in Wheeldon's Cinderella as the stepmother.

== Personal life ==
In 1989, Waldo married Marshall Crutcher, a composer. Their son was born in 1999.
