= Jocelyn Vollmar =

American ballerina

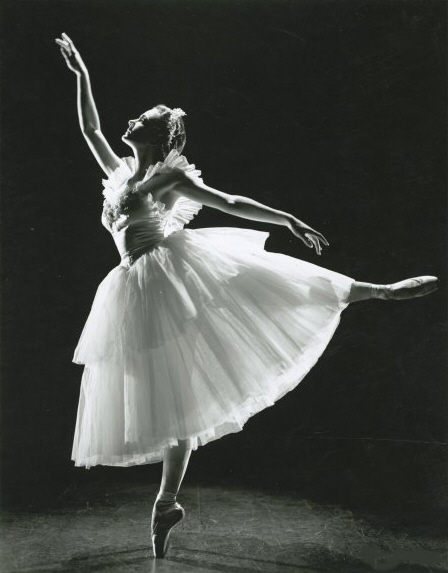
Jocelyn Vollmar as Myrtha in Giselle.

Jocelyn Vollmar (November 25, 1925 – July 13, 2018) was an American ballerina, known for her career with the San Francisco Ballet.

== Career ==
Vollmar was born in San Francisco, California, where she began dancing with the San Francisco Ballet at age 12. Under the tutelage of Willam Christensen, Vollmar started dancing in small roles with the San Francisco Ballet in productions including the 1939 premiere of Coppélia and the first full-length Swan Lake produced in America, in 1940. Upon her graduation from Lowell High School at age 17, she joined the company. With the San Francisco Ballet, Vollmar went on to dance as the Snow Queen in The Nutcracker in 1944, in its first full American production.

In 1948, Vollmar was invited by George Balanchine to dance as a principal with New York City Ballet during its inaugural year. After the New York City Ballet, Vollmar also danced with the American Ballet Theatre and Grand Ballet du Marquis de Cuevas (the precursor of the Grand Ballet de Monte Carlo). Vollmar was invited by Edouard Borovansky, the former Ballets Russes dancer, to dance with the Borovansky Ballet, the precursor of the Australian Ballet, in 1954, where she stayed for two years. While in Australia, Vollmar danced leading roles in Giselle, Les Sylphides, The Nutcracker and several ballets restaged from the Ballets Russes repertoire, including Petrushka.

Vollmar returned to the San Francisco Ballet in 1956, and danced with the company until 1972, retiring after the Nutcracker season in 1972. After retiring as a dancer, Vollmar served as a teacher and choreographer for several ballet companies. She was a teacher at the San Francisco Ballet School from 1985 to 2005.
