= Yumiko =

- Pronunciation: Yu-mi-ko
- Gender: Female

Origin
- Origin: Japanese
- Meaning: Many different meanings depending on the kanji used.
- Region of origin: Japan

Other names
- Related names: Yumi; Yumika

Yumiko is a feminine Japanese given name.

== Written forms ==
Yumiko can be written using different kanji characters and can mean:

- 弓子, "bow, child".
- 由美子, "reason/cause, beauty, child".
- 結実子, "fruition, child".
- 夕実子, "evening, fruit, child".
- 優美子, "tenderness, beauty, child".
- 悠美子, "permanence, beauty, child".
- 祐美子, "help, beauty, child".
- 由実子, "reason/cause, fruit, child".
- 有美子, "exist/possess, beauty, child".
- 夕美子, "evening, beauty, child".
- 友美子, "friend, beauty, child".
- 裕美子, "rich, beauty, child".
- 勇美子, "brave, beauty, child".

The name can also be written in hiragana or katakana.

== People ==
- Yumiko Abe (阿部 由美子; born 1979), Japanese professional wrestler
- Yumiko Aoyagi (青柳 祐美子; born 1970), Japanese television writer
- Yumiko Cheng (鄭烈瓊; born 1981), Hong Kong Cantopop singer and actress
- Yumiko Ehara (江原 由美子; born 1952), Japanese sociologist
- Yumiko Fujii (藤井 由宮子; born 1972), Japanese softball player
- Yumiko Fujita (藤田 弓子; born 1945), Japanese actress
- Yumiko Fukushima (福島 弓子; born 1965), Japanese TBS TV announcer
- Yumiko Hara (原裕 美子; born 1982), Japanese marathon runner
- Yumiko Himei (姫井 由美子; born 1959), Japanese former politician
- Yumiko Hosono (細野 佑美子; born 1981), Japanese actress, voice actress, and singer
- Yumiko Hotta (堀田 祐美子; born 1967), Japanese professional wrestler and mixed martial artist
- Yumiko Igarashi (いがらし ゆみこ; born 1950), Japanese manga artist
- Yumiko Ishiguro (石黒 由美子; born 1983), Japanese synchronized swimmer
- Yumiko Iwase (岩瀬 佑美子; born 1990), Japanese former idol of the idol group Nogizaka46
- Yumiko Kato (加藤由美子; born 1968), Japanese luger
- Yumiko Kawahara (川原 由美子; born 1960), Japanese shōjo manga artist
- Yumiko Kayukawa (粥川 由美子; born 1970), Japanese visual artist
- Yumiko Kobayashi (小林 由美子; born 1979), Japanese voice actress
- Yumiko Kokonoe (九重 佑三子; born 1946), Japanese actress and singer
- Yumiko Kurahashi (倉橋 由美子; 1935–2005), Japanese writer
- Yumiko Kurisu (来栖 由美子; born 1961), Japanese classical soprano, a musicologist and an academic teacher
- Yumiko Nakagawa, a Japanese girl whose murder may be the center of an Okinawan controversy.
- Yumiko Nogawa (野川 由美子; born 1944), Japanese actress
- Yumiko Ohno (大野 由美子; born 1966), Japanese bassist of the rock band Buffalo Daughter
- Yumiko Okada (岡田 結美子; born 1970), Japanese professional 6 dan Go player
- Yumiko Ono (小野裕美子; born 1954), Japanese former swimmer
- Yumiko Ōshima (大島 弓子; born 1947), Japanese manga artist
- Yumiko Seki (関 有美子; born 1998), Japanese former idol of the idol group Sakurazaka46
- Yumiko Shaku (釈 由美子; born 1978), Japanese actress, model and former gravure idol
- Yumiko Shibata (柴田 由美子; born 1964), Japanese former voice actress
- Yumiko Shige (重 由美子; 1965–2018), Japanese sailor
- Yumiko Shirai (白井 弓子; born 1967), Japanese manga artist
- Yumiko Suzuki (鈴木 祐美子; born 1976), Japanese sprint canoer
- Yumiko Suzuki (鈴木 裕美子; born 1960), Japanese former cyclist
- Yumiko Takahashi (高橋 由美子; born 1974), Japanese actress and singer
- Yumiko Takeshima (竹島 由美子; born 1970), Japanese costume designer, ballet dancer, and founder of YUMIKO dancewear.
- Yumiko Takino (瀧野 由美子; born 1997), Japanese tarento, model, presenter, actress and former idol singer
- Yumiko Tsuzuki (都築 有美子; born 1983), Japanese volleyball player
- Yumiko Udo (有働 由美子; born 1969), Japanese journalist, television reporter, television personality, and former NHK Announcer.
- Yumiko Urabe (占部 由美子; born 1959), Japanese pianist
- Yumiko Yamano (山野 由美子; born 1988), Japanese handball player

== Fictional characters ==
- Yumiko Kusaka (友美子), a character in the novel, film and manga Battle Royale.
- Yumiko Shirasagi (白鷺弓子), a character in the novel series Digital Devil Story and the video game adaptation Digital Devil Story: Megami Tensei.
- Yumiko Takagi (高木由美子), a character in the anime and manga series Hellsing.
- Yumiko Sakaki (榊由美子), a character in the Grisaia series of visual novels.
- Yumiko (弓子), a female Japanese-American character in the comic book series The Walking Dead as well as the TV series adaptation.
- Yumiko "Hibana" Imagawa (今川 由美子), a character in the video game series Tom Clancy's Rainbow Six Siege
- Yumiko, a character in the fighting game, Brawlhalla.
- Mirkou Yumiko (弥勒 夕海子), a character from Kusunoki Mebuki is a Hero.
