= Études (ballet) =

Ballet by Danish dancer and choreographer Harald Lander

Études is a one-act ballet choreographed by Danish dancer and choreographer Harald Lander to piano studies by Carl Czerny arranged for orchestra by Knudåge Riisager. It is considered Lander's most famous choreographic work and brought him international fame. The work premiered on 15 January 1948 at the Royal Danish Theatre in Copenhagen with the Royal Danish Ballet, with scenery and costumes by Rolf Gerard and lighting by Nananne Porcher.

Études is considered an homage to classical ballet training. It begins with traditional ballet exercises at the barre and ends with spectacular bravura displays.

The original cast included: Margot Lander, Hans Brenaa, Svend Erik Jensen, Inge Sand and Inge Goth. Its ABT premiere at the 54th Street Theatre in New York took place on 5 October 1961 and featured dancers Toni Lander, Royes Fernandez, Bruce Marks, Eleanor D'Antuono and Elisabeth Carroll.

== Sections ==
The order of the various sections of the ballet, as recorded by the Danish National Radio Symphony Orchestra and conducted by Gennady Rozhdestvensky in 1997, include (followed by numbers of the original pieces by Czerny):

Section name	Czerny original étude	Notes
Overture	op. 299 no. 9	
Exercises at the barre
Tendus, Grands battements, fondus and frappés	op. 261 no. 23, op. 740 no. 32, op. 740 no. 12, op. 355 no. 9	
Ronds de jambe	op. 355 no. 1	
Silhouetter — Au milieu	op. 335 no. 37	
Au milieu
Adagio	op. 335 no. 20	
Port de Bras et pas de badin	op. 821 no. 4, op. 299 no. 27	
Mirror Dance	op. 139 no. 54	
Ensemble	op. 740 no. 45	
Romantic Pas de deux	op. 335 no. 39	
Sortie	op. 740 no. 45	
Conclusion	op. 335 no. 37	
Pirouettes	op. 335 no. 16	
Relevés	op. 335 no. 35	
Piques et grands pirouettes	op. 740 no. 49, op. 636 no. 17	
Solo for the Prima Ballerina	op. 299 no. 40	
Coda	op. 335 no. 16, op. 740 no. 49	
Small Leaps	op. 335 no. 19, op. 299 no. 17, op. 740 no. 40, op. 740 no. 16, op. 821 no. 89	op. 821 no. 89 is transposed from C♯ minor to G minor
Mazurka	op. 355 no. 36	
Tarantella	op. 834 no. 27	
Broad Leaps (Finale)	op. 740 no. 37, op. 740 no. 15, op. 365 no. 45	op. 740 no. 15 is transposed from E♭ to D
