= Christiana Bennett =

American ballet dancer

- Occupation: Ballet dancer
- Spouse: Christipher Ruud (divorced)
- Career
- Former groups: Ballet West; Commonwealth Ballet
- Dances: Ballet

Christiana Bennett is a former ballet dancer, who was the principal female dancer for the Ballet West company, and was featured on The CW reality television series Breaking Pointe.

== Career ==
Bennett was born in Townsend, Massachusetts. She said she was inspired to take up ballet after watching The Nutcracker on television when she was two years old. She recalls that she announced to her parents that evening that she was going to become a ballet dancer. She began to take lessons at the age of six, as her mother was initially reluctant. This opinion changed only when Bennett's mother fell pregnant once more and wanted to find an activity for Bennett to do. Bennett gave up ballet following an injury to her ankle while she was in High School. It was only after graduation that she began once more, following the suggestion of a teacher. Bennett had surgery on her ankle and was told by doctors that she would be unable to dance, and probably walk with a limp for the rest of her life. Despite this, she continued to dance and routinely purchases high heels each year on the anniversary of that discussion with doctors.

Bennett was a member of the Commonwealth Ballet between 1997–98. She also performed with the Pacific Northwest Ballet and was a guest artist for the City Ballet of Boston. She joined Salt Lake City based company Ballet West in 1999. It was in 2012 that she became well known, when as prima ballerina for Ballet West, she appeared in the reality television series Breaking Pointe on The CW. She said that the series had the effect of showing the human side of ballet, "They got to see the good, the bad and the ugly." During the second season, the breakdown and eventual breakup of her marriage to fellow dancer Christopher Ruud was shown. Despite this, they remained professionally amicable and performed together in the world premiere of the ballet "Façade". After 16 years with the company, Bennett retired from ballet in 2015 at the age of 34. Her final performances were part of Ballet West's "Innovations 2015" season. She is the recipient of the Coca-Cola Foundation Arts Award and the National Foundation for Advancement in the Arts award in dance.

After her retirement as a dancer, Bennett joined that artistic staff at the Alberta Ballet as their Ballet Mistress.
