= Julie Diana =

American ballet dancer, teacher, arts administrator and writer

- Born: 1976 or 1977 (age 48–49)
- Education: New Jersey Ballet; School of American Ballet; University of Pennsylvania (BA)
- Occupations: ballet dancer; ballet master; writer; arts administrator
- Spouse: Zachary Hench (m. 2006)
- Children: 2
- Career
- Current group: American Repertory Ballet; Princeton Ballet School
- Former groups: San Francisco Ballet; Pennsylvania Ballet; Juneau Dance Theatre

Julie Diana Hench (born 1976 or 1977) is an American ballet dancer, teacher, writer and arts administrator. She joined the San Francisco Ballet in 1993, and was promoted to principal dancer in 2000. In 2004, she joined the Pennsylvania Ballet, where she remained until her retirement from performing in 2014, though she remained in the company for another year as a ballet master. In 2015, she became the executive director at Juneau Dance Theatre. In 2017, she was named executive director of the American Repertory Ballet and Princeton Ballet School. She has written for various dance publications.

== Early life and education ==
Diana is from Verona, New Jersey. She started ballet at age seven, having previously trained in gymnastics. She trained at New Jersey Ballet, before entering the School of American Ballet at age twelve.

In 2008, Diana graduated summa cum laude from the University of Pennsylvania with a BA in English.

== Career ==
In 1993, 16-year-old Diana joined the San Francisco Ballet. She was promoted to principal dancer in 2000. During her time in San Francisco, she had worked with Lynn Seymour. In 2004, she won the Isadora Duncan Dance Award for Ensemble Performance with colleagues Joanna Berman and Katita Waldo, for Robbins' Dances at a Gathering. In 2004, she moved to Philadelphia and joined the Pennsylvania Ballet. Her repertory with the two companies also included full-length classics and works by George Balanchine, Kenneth MacMillan, John Cranko, Helgi Tómasson, William Forsythe, Mark Morris, Christopher Wheeldon and Nacho Duato.

In 2008, when Diana was pregnant, she began writing for Dance Spirit magazine. She has since become a contributing editor of Dance Teacher, and also researches and writes for dance publications such as Pointe and Dance Magazine, as well as Playbill, on topics such as ballet and health.

In 2014, she retired from performing. Her final performance was in Wheeldon's After the Rain. Diana, who had suffered from chronic hip injury since 2007, considered giving her final performance in Swan Lake the following year, but thought she would be physically unable to do so, and believed After the Rain "would be a perfect way to retire." Diana remained at the Pennsylvania Ballet for a year as a ballet master.

In 2015, she left Pennsylvania Ballet to serve as the executive director of Alaska-based Juneau Dance Theatre, having previously taught a master class there. Her husband and former Pennsylvania Ballet principal dancer Zachary Hench served as artistic director. In addition to administrative tasks, she also taught and worked as a répétiteur for the George Balanchine Trust. In 2017, she became the executive director of American Repertory Ballet and Princeton Ballet School in New Jersey. After artistic director Douglas Martin left in 2019, Diana also took over the artistic duties until Ethan Stiefel became the company's artistic director in July 2021.

== Personal life ==
In 2005, Diana became engaged to Zachary Hench, a fellow Pennsylvania Ballet principal dancer and former San Francisco Ballet colleague. They married the following year, and have two children.

She served as the president of the University of Pennsylvania Alumnae Association.
