= Steven Galloway =

Steven Galloway may refer to:

- Steven Galloway (writer), Canadian novelist and professor
- Steven Galloway (politician), member of the Montana House of Representatives
- Steve Galloway, English footballer and coach
- Stephen Galloway, American dancer
