= List of ballets by Harald Lander =

The following is a list of ballets created by Harald Lander (1905 – 1971), who was a Danish ballet master, choreographer and ballet teacher at the Royal Danish Ballet school. He choreographed more than 30 ballets in his lifetime, most of them made for the Royal Danish Ballet company.

- Gaucho, music by Emil Reesen (first performance 1931).
- Diana, music by Francis Poulenc (first performance 1933).
- Zaporogerne or Russian folk, music by Emil Reesen (first performance 1933).
- Football, music by Francis Poulenc (first performance 1933).
- Russian Dance, music by Knudåge Riisager (first performance 1934).
- Bolero, music by Maurice Ravel (first performance 1935).
- The Little Mermaid, music by Fini Valdemar Henriques (first performance 1936).
- The Seven Deadly Sins, music by Kurt Weill (first performance 1936).
- Thorvaldsen, music by Johan Hye-Knudsen (first performance 1938).
- La Valse, music by Maurice Ravel (first performance 1939).
- The Sorcerer's Apprentice, music by Paul Dukas (first performance 1940).
- Quarrtsiluni, music by Knudåge Riisager (first performance 1942).
- Fest-Polonaise, music by Johan Svendsen (first performance 1942).
- Quasi una Fantasia, music by Ludwig van Beethoven (first performance 1944).
- Rebild, music by Walther Schroeder (first performance 1945).
- Bird Phoenix, music by Knudåge Riisager (first performance 1946).
- Pageant of Kjeld Abell, music by Knudåge Riisager (first performance 1948).
- Études, music by Carl Czerny, piano studies arranged for orchestra by Knudåge Riisager (first performance 1948).
- Printemps à Vienne, music by Franz Schubert (first performance 1954).
- Concerto aux étoiles, music by Béla Bartók (first performance 1956).
- Les Victoires de l'Amour, music by Jean-Baptiste Lully, arranged for orchestra by Knudåge Riisager (first performance 1956).
