= Yumika (name) =

- Gender: Female

Origin
- Origin: Japanese
- Meaning: different meanings depending on the kanji used
- Region of origin: Japan

Other names
- Related names: Yumi; Yumiko

Yumika (ゆみか, ユミカ) is a feminine Japanese given name.

== Written forms ==
Yumika can be written using different kanji characters and can mean:

- 弓香, "bow, fragrance"
- 弓華, "bow, beautiful"
- 有美香,"exist, beauty, fragrance"
- 由美香, "reason/cause, beauty, fragrance"
- 結実華, "fruition, beautiful"
- 夕実華, "evening, fruit, beautiful"
- 優美佳, "tenderness, beauty, good"
- 悠美佳, "permanence, beauty, good"
- 祐美花, "help, beauty, flower"
- 由実花, "reason/cause, fruit, flower"
- 有美加, "exist/possess, beauty, add"
- 友美加, "friend, beauty, add"
- 裕美嘉, "rich, beauty, praise"
- 勇美嘉, "brave, beauty, praise"

The name can also be written in hiragana or katakana.

== People ==
- Yumika Hayashi (由美香), a Japanese pink film actress
- Yumika Yano, a Japanese voice actress
