= Patrick Armand =

French ballet dancer

- Born: Marseille, France
- Education: Ecole de Danse de Marseille
- Occupations: Ballet dancer and director
- Years active: 1981–present
- Known for: Principal Dancer at English National Ballet; Director of San Francisco Ballet School
- Awards: Prix de Lausanne (1980)

Patrick Armand is a French retired ballet dancer, and the director of the San Francisco Ballet School from 2017 to 2023.

== Early life ==
Armand was born in Marseille, France, where he studied at the Ecole de Danse de Marseille. In 1980, he won the Prix de Lausanne.

In 1981, he joined the Ballet Théâtre Français, rising to principal dancer in 1983. The same year, he was nominated for a Laurence Olivier award for his performance of Maurice Bejart's Songs of a Wayfarer, which he performed with Rudolf Nureyev. From 1984 to 1990, he was with English National Ballet as a principal dancer, and then joined Boston Ballet.

Armand has been a jury member of the Prix de Lausanne on several occasions since 1998. He served as ballet master and also as a faculty member at Teatro alla Scala in Milan until 2010. It was at this point that he took over as the Principal of the San Francisco Ballet School Trainee program.

From 2012 to 2017, Armand was associate director of the San Francisco Ballet School, when he succeeded Lola de Avila, becoming director in 2017.
