= Breaking Pointe =

American reality television series (2012–2013)

- Genre: Reality
- Country of origin: United States
- Original language: English
- No. of seasons: 2
- No. of episodes: 15

Production
- Executive producers: Leola Westbrook; Izzie Pick Ashcroft; Jane Tranter; Matthew Vafiadis
- Running time: 43 minutes
- Production company: Adjacent Productions

Original release
- Network: The CW
- Release: May 31, 2012 – September 16, 2013

Breaking Pointe is an American reality television series that premiered on May 31, 2012, on The CW. It goes behind the scenes at Ballet West, a ballet company based in Salt Lake City, Utah. In September 2012, Breaking Pointe was renewed for a second season, which premiered on July 22, 2013.

In January 2014, The CW canceled the series after two seasons.

== Cast ==
- Christiana Bennett: One of Ballet West's principal dancers. She joined in 1999 and was promoted to a principal role in 2004.
- Elizabeth McGrath: Elizabeth McGrath was born in Miller Place, New York. Training includes The Seiskaya Ballet in St. James, New York under the tutelage of Valia Seiskaya and the Harid Conservatory in Boca Raton, Florida. She joined Ballet West in 2001, promoted to Demi-Soloist in 2006, promoted to Soloist in 2010 and promoted to First Soloist in 2012.
- Christopher Ruud: One of Ballet West's Principal Dancers. He joined Ballet West in 1998. He was promoted to Soloist in 2001 and Principal in 2004. Originally from San Francisco and is the son of dancer and choreographer Tomm Ruud. He was married to Christiana Bennett.
- Ronnie Underwood: First soloist at Ballet West. Joined in 2011.
- Allison DeBona: Soloist at Ballet West. Joined in 2007 and was promoted in 2013. She is engaged to fellow dancer Rex Tilton.
- Rex Tilton: First soloist at Ballet West. Joined in 2008. He is engaged to fellow dancer Allison DeBona. He is brother to fellow dancer, Ronald Tilton, and brother of Raymond Tilton who dances with the San Francisco Ballet.
- Beckanne Sisk: Soloist at Ballet West. Since she was only 19, her promotion from corps to demi-soloist in the first episode causes resentment and jealousy from the older dancers in the company. She was again promoted to Soloist in 2013, and principal in 2015. Allison DeBona, the character who is portrayed as resenting her the most, is still not a principal dancer.
- Kathleen "Katie" Martin: Ex-dancer at Ballet West. During the first episode, her contract for the next ballet season was not renewed, so later episodes featured her auditioning for new ballet companies and possibly having to leave behind her boyfriend, fellow dancer, Ronald Tilton. She dances for Ballet Idaho in the second season but returns for some episodes.
- Ronald Tilton: Dancer at Ballet West. He is in a relationship with fellow dancer, Katie Martin. He is brother to fellow dancer, Rex Tilton.
- Joshua Whitehead Is an apprentice with Ballet West and was introduced in season 2.
- Silver Barkes Supplemental dancer.
- Zachary Prentice Was introduced in season 2 as part of Ballet West II. He was competing for a spot in Ballet West's main company against Ian Tanzer and was chosen over Ian.
- Ian Tanzer Introduced in season 2 was part of Ballet West II he lost out on a contract with Ballet West to Zachary Prentice. After auditioning, he was given a contract with the Sarasota Ballet in Florida.
- Adam Sklute: The Artistic Director of Ballet West. Adam began dance at 16 in San Francisco and was later accepted into Joffrey II as an apprentice. After two years of apprenticeship, he was accepted to Joffrey Ballet's main company and was one of the last two dancers accepted by Robert Joffrey. He took over direction of Ballet West in 2007.

== Episodes ==
Season	Episodes	Originally aired	
Season	Episodes	Season premiere	Season finale
1	6	May 31, 2012	July 5, 2012
2	9	July 22, 2013	September 16, 2013

=== Season 1 (2012) ===
No.	Title	Original air date	Rating/Share (18–49)	U.S. viewers (millions)
1	"Survival of the Fittest"	May 31, 2012	0.3/1	0.93
2	"Which Life Do I Want to Lead?"	June 7, 2012	0.2/1	0.63
3	"Second Cast Is First Place For Losers"	June 14, 2012	0.3/1	0.82
4	"Tempo Tantrums"	June 21, 2012	0.3/1	0.84
5	"Bad Dress: Good Show"	June 28, 2012	0.2/1	0.62
6	"Curtain Call"	July 5, 2012	0.3/1	0.86

=== Season 2 (2013) ===
No.	Title	Original air date	Rating/Share (18–49)	U.S. viewers (millions)
1	"It's Not Brain Surgery, It's Ballet!"	July 22, 2013	0.2/1	0.52
2	"You Can Feel the Tension"	July 29, 2013	0.2/1	0.54
3	"It's Cinderella or Nothing"	August 5, 2013	0.1/0	0.41
4	"Love or Ballet"	August 12, 2013	0.2/1	0.49
5	"Fighting Tooth and Nail"	August 19, 2013	0.2/0	0.47
6	"Nowhere Near Ready"	August 26, 2013	0.2/0	0.51
7	"This Ballet Is Cursed"	September 2, 2013	0.2/0	0.49
8	"It's Time to Face the Music"	September 9, 2013	0.2/1	0.48
9	"The Story of Us"	September 16, 2013	0.2/0	0.43
