= Olivia Book =

Canadian ballerina (born 2003)

Olivia Book (born 2003) is a Canadian professional ballerina with a congenital limb difference, a rarity in a field which traditionally holds rigid body standards. She currently dances with Ballet West in Salt Lake City, having initially enrolled in their academy in 2019 and earning a promotion to the corps de ballet in February 2026.

== Early life and education ==
Book was born with a congenital limb difference in 2003. As a child, Book used assistive devices to skip rope, ride a bike, and kayak. She showed interest in ballet from the age of three. She found it helpful to attend ballet classes with a friend to protect against any potential social exclusion from classmates. Her childhood ballet teacher had an adjustable-height barre made to accommodate her limb difference, and her father later built her an attachment that could be secured to any barre. She told a reporter that balancing using one arm caused her to build strong back muscles. Book attended Blessed Trinity Catholic High School in Grimsby, Ontario and trained at Niagara Ballet School. She was offered a spot at the Royal Danish Ballet Elite summer program in Copenhagen as soon as she reached the minimum age of 15. Book's performance in a 2019 dance competition in Toronto prompted a judge, Adam Sklute, to offer her a position at Ballet West Academy in Salt Lake City, where he was artistic director. She enrolled that year.

== Career and impact ==
In 2023, Book joined the second company at Ballet West, and was thought to be the only dancer with a limb difference at a professional United States ballet company. She was promoted to the corps de ballet in February 2026.

Sophie Bress of the New York Times placed Book's impact in the context of ballet's "rethinking its relationship to diversity in areas like race and body type". Bress quoted Bradford Chin, a scholar of dance at the University of Wisconsin, who studies ballet's image of a healthy body and what makes a qualified dancer. Chin cautioned that Book's notability should not hinge only on her limb difference, but on her artistry as a whole. Book acknowledged that other dancers with limb differences have named her as an inspiration, adding that she was glad to serve in this role.

== Personal life ==
Book has noted that having a "little arm" (her right arm) has necessitated relying primarily on her left arm for everyday tasks. To maintain total independence in her professional routines, she developed custom methods for tying her own pointe shoe ribbons and styling her hair bun.
