= The Vertiginous Thrill of Exactitude =

Ballet by William Forsythe

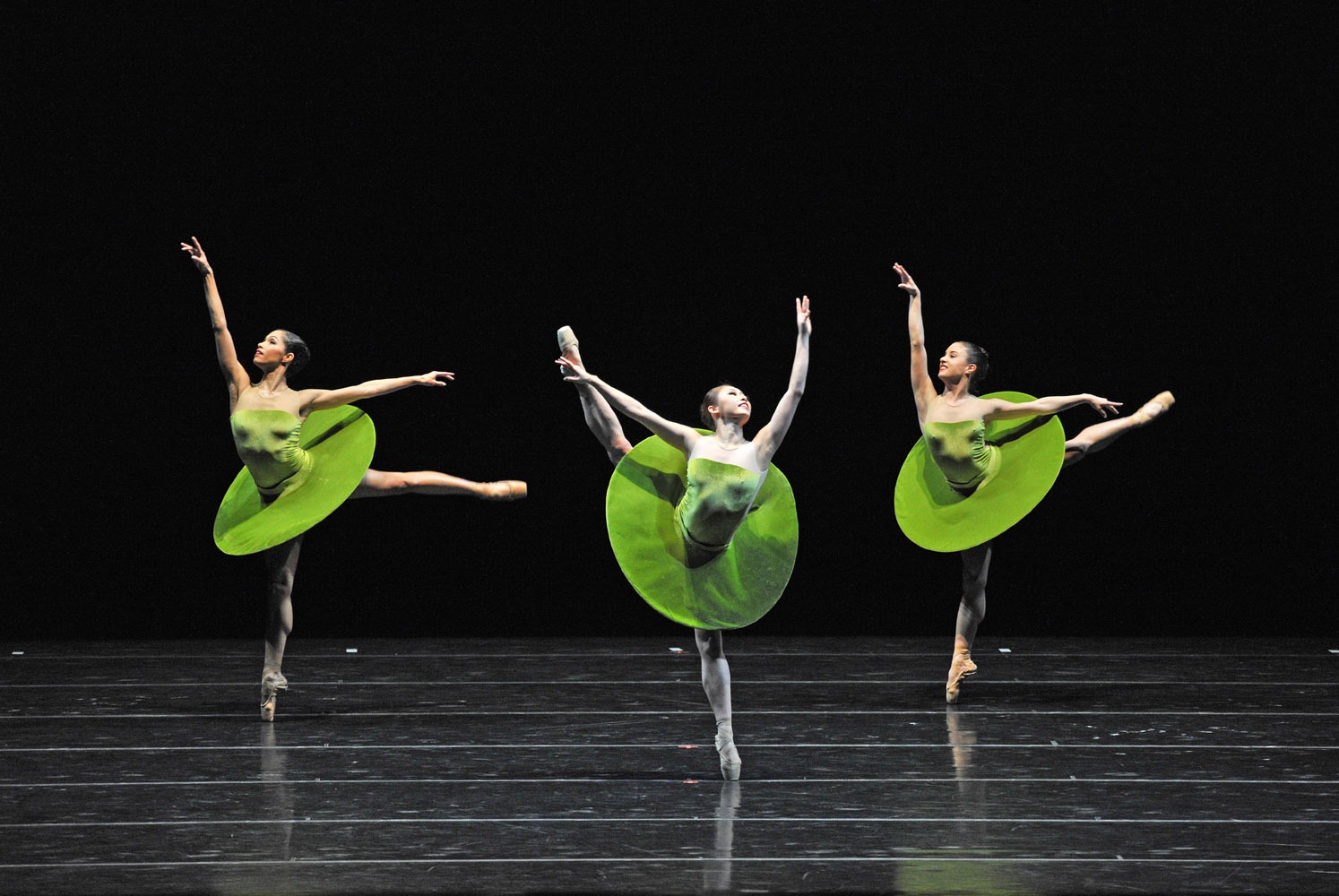
- The Vertiginous Thrill of Exactitude performed at Liceu, Barcelona
- Choreographer: William Forsythe
- Music: Franz Schubert
- Premiere: 20 January 1996; Städtische Bühnen Frankfurt
- Original ballet company: Frankfurt Ballet
- Design: Stephen Galloway; William Forsythe

The Vertiginous Thrill of Exactitude is a ballet choreographed by William Forsythe to the finale of Schubert's Symphony No. 9. The ballet was choreographed for Frankfurt Ballet's programme Six Counter Points, and was presented as a ballet "in the Manner of the late 20th Century." Danced by a cast of five, the ballet features classical and technically demanding choreography. It premiered on 20 January 1996, at Frankfurt. It had since been performed by many other ballet companies.

== Choreography ==
The Vertiginous Thrill of Exactitude is set to the finale, allegro vivace, of Schubert's Symphony No. 9. The ballet is usually danced to a recording of the score, with amplification effects. The ballet is danced by three women and two men, with solos, duets, trios and group formations. The choreography consists of classical ballet steps. (Note: In 2023, the Dutch National Ballet performed the ballet with six women and two men, with the choreography spread out between more dancers, and the six women only gather near the end of the ballet.) Dance critic Zoë Anderson described the ballet, "The performance style looks back to the graciousness of nineteenth-century tutu works, while moving at a walloping pace." Dance researcher Ann Nugent wrote that the ballet is "effectively a baroque ballet where classical form is embellished by the limbs' delicate tracery. It is supremely elegant, with just the hint of a subtext, a sense that the classical occasionally likes to break out of its restraints."

Vertiginous Thrill is known for its technically demanding choreography, to the point where a dancer told Forsythe she would rather give birth again than to dance the ballet. He explained,

Apparently, it has a reputation of being extremely difficult to dance. But then again, dancers do like challenge. I made it for that reason, to exploit the talent that I had at that time... one of the really important things is for people to pay attention to the music. People get involved with the steps, which are finally of absolutely no value without the musicality. I think that I'd left a lot of the musical nuance over to those dancers because they were so skilled. Then you go back, and you're going, 'Okay, what was it exactly?' You thought it was somehow all your own craft, and it wasn't, it was actually their incredible artistry.

== Development ==
Forsythe, the artistic director of Frankfurt Ballet, choreographed The Vertiginous Thrill of Exactitude for company's full-evening programme Six Counter Points, which also incorporates his earlier ballets Four Point Counter and The The, and three other new ballets, Duo, Trio and Approximate Sonata. Vertiginous Thrill is the last ballet on the programme, and along with Approximate Sonata, are presented as "Two Ballets in the Manner of the late 20th Century". The five original cast members are Laura Graham, Francesca Harper, Helen Pickett, Noah D. Gelber and Desmond Richardson.

Forsythe also designed the decor and lighting. The costumes were designed by Stephen Galloway, who was the company's head costume designer, style coordinator and a principal dancer. The men are dressed in red leotards. The women are in pancake-like green tutus. Unlike traditional tutus, these are flat, single-layered and stiff, with no underfills.

== Performances ==
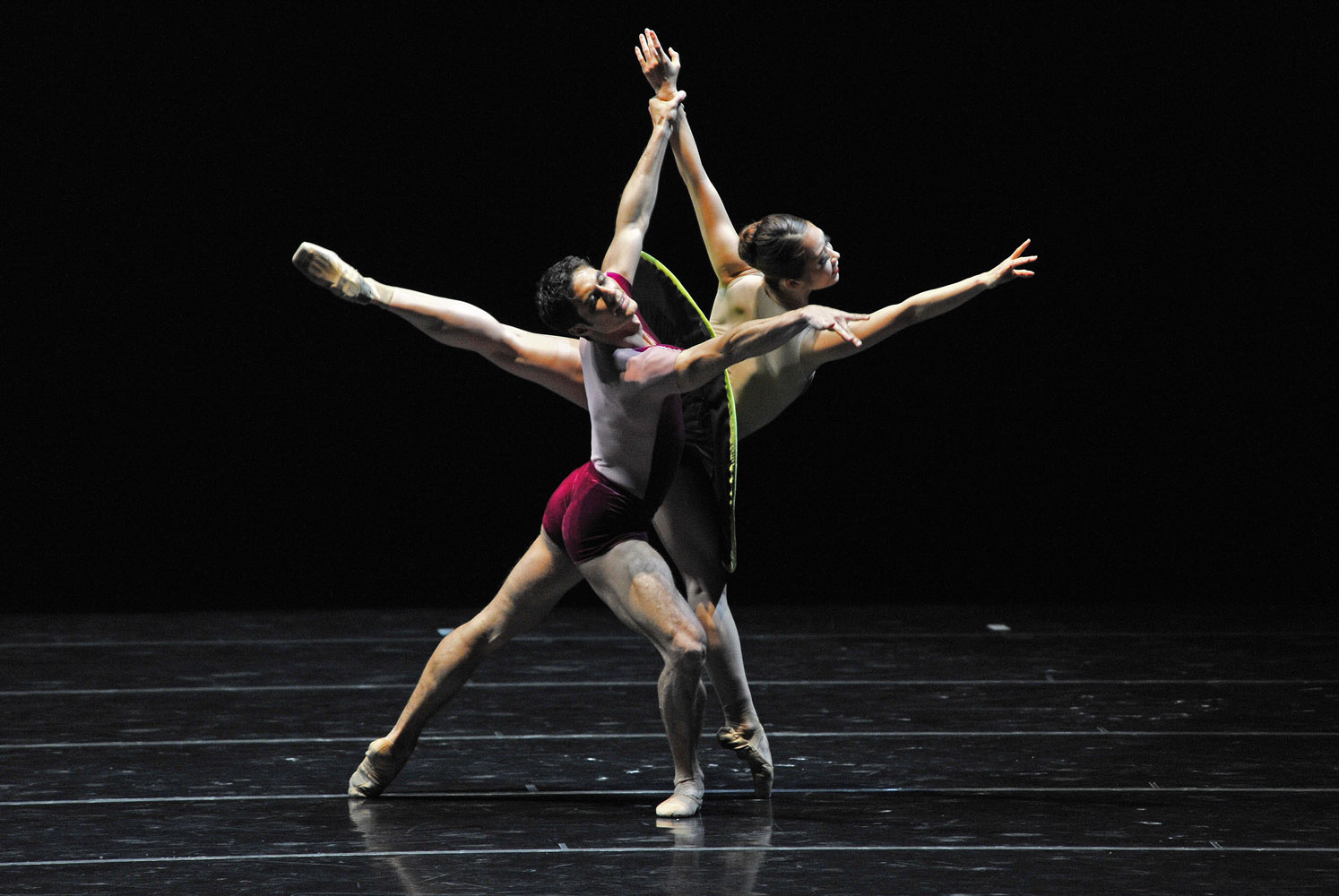
The Vertiginous Thrill of Exactitude performed at Liceu, Barcelona

The Vertiginous Thrill of Exactitude premiered on 20 January 1996, at Städtische Bühnen Frankfurt, along with the rest of the Six Counter Points program.

Many other ballet companies had performed Vertiginous Thrill, including Paris Opera Ballet, the Royal Ballet, Stuttgart Ballet, Mariinsky Ballet, San Francisco Ballet, Dutch National Ballet, National Ballet of Canada, Boston Ballet, Pacific Northwest Ballet, Vienna State Ballet, Pennsylvania Ballet and Rome Opera Ballet.
