= Alfredo Corvino =

Alfredo Corvino (February 2, 1916 – August 2, 2005) was a Uruguayan ballet dancer and ballet teacher.

== Early life and education ==
Corvino was born in Montevideo, Uruguay, and studied violin with his father who was a member of the Philharmonic Orchestra of Montevideo. He studied ballet as a scholarship student of Alberto Pouyanne at the National Academy of Ballet, now known as the Uruguay National Ballet School. He became a principal dancer with the Municipal Theater in Uruguay and was a choreographer and assistant ballet-master for the company as well.

== Ballet career ==
Corvino first toured Latin America with the Ballets Jooss, directed by the German-born expressionist, Kurt Jooss. He toured the United States with the Ballet Russe de Monte Carlo as a soloist, performing Le Spectre de la Rose, Bluebird from The Sleeping Beauty and Carnaval. He enlisted in the U.S. Army during World War II and later joined the Metropolitan Opera Ballet in New York. At the MET, Corvino performed and became ballet master of the ballet company. He was also a dedicated teacher at the Metropolitan Opera Ballet School for 20 years.

Corvino's exceptional training was greatly influenced by Enrico Cecchetti, the Italian master ballet teacher who worked with the Russian Imperial Ballet and Serge Diaghilev's Ballets Russes troupe. Other notable ballet instructors, including Anatole Vilzak, Edward Caton, Boris Romanoff, and Alexander Gavrilov, contributed to Corvino's training. The Cecchetti training method was passed down to him by the British authority, Margaret Craske. Corvino also studied with Antony Tudor, a founding choreographer of American Ballet Theatre and director of the Metropolitan Opera Ballet and its school in the 1950s. Tudor invited Corvino to join the newly created dance division at The Juilliard School in 1952. Thus began Corvino's association with The Juilliard School, where he was a dedicated teacher for more than 40 years.

Corvino has appeared with numerous dance groups, including the Radio City Music Hall Ballet, Dance Players, Herbert Ross's company, the Gavrilov Company, the Classic Ballet Company of New Jersey and Dance Circle. His international teaching credits include the Folkwang Hochschule in Germany, Bellas Artes in Caracas, the Rotterdamse Dansacademie in the Netherlands, the Theatre Contemporain de la Danse in Paris, the Cloud Gate Dance Theater in Taiwan, and the International Festival of Dance Academies in Hong Kong. As a choreographer, Corvino worked with the Roxy Theater, the Amato Opera, the Princeton Ballet, the Maryland Ballet, and the Dance Circle troupe. He also performed with and for 10 years directed the New Jersey Dance Theater Guild (NJDTE).

On May 23, 2003, The Juilliard School awarded Alfredo Corvino an honorary doctor of fine arts degree in recognition of his contributions to dance instruction, his career as a performer and choreographer, and his dedication and commitment to dance. He was also the recipient of the 2002 Martha Hill Award for Leadership in Dance and the Juilliard Centennial Medal (May 2005).

Corvino taught ballet with great respect of human anatomy. He recognized that many dancers became injured because they consistently worked against their own body. He stressed anatomical accuracy, musicality in dance, energy and resistance and the basic principles behind movement. He focused on the anatomy of movement to nurture the dancer's body and prolong the dancer's career.

Corvino died in August 2005. His work in the world of dance is continued by his two daughters - Andra Corvino, a member of The Juilliard School dance faculty and Ernesta Corvino, a ballet teacher, choreographer and director of the Dance Circle troupe. His wife, Marcella Rubin, who was known for her elaborate costume designs, died in 2004.
