= San Francisco Ballet =

U.S. ballet company

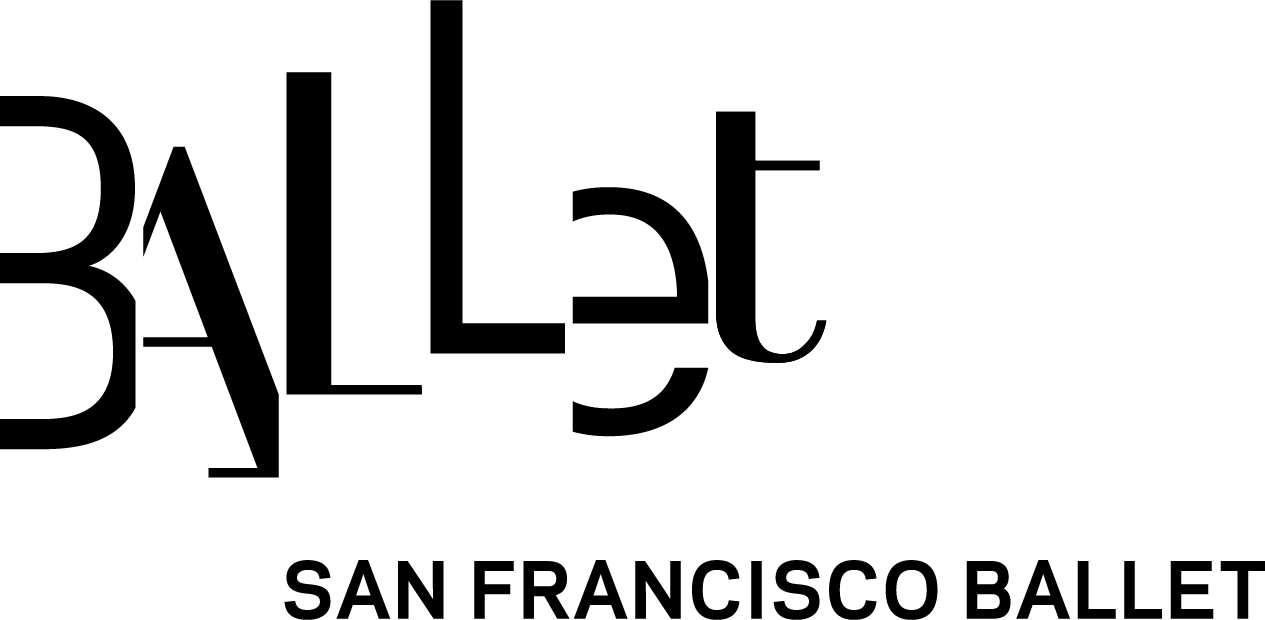

General information
- Name: San Francisco Ballet
- Previous names: San Francisco Opera Ballet
- Year founded: 1933; 93 years ago
- Founders: Willam Christensen, Harold Christensen, Lew Christensen
- Principal venue: War Memorial Opera House; San Francisco
- Website: www.sfballet.org

Artistic staff
- Artistic director: Tamara Rojo
- Principal conductor: Martin West

Other
- Official school: San Francisco Ballet School http://school.sfballet.org

San Francisco Ballet is the oldest ballet company in the United States, founded in 1933 as the San Francisco Opera Ballet under the leadership of ballet master Adolph Bolm. The company is currently based in the War Memorial Opera House, San Francisco. Tamara Rojo has been its director since December 2022.

It is among the world's leading dance companies, presenting more than 100 performances annually, with a repertoire that spans both classical and contemporary ballet. Along with American Ballet Theatre and the New York City Ballet, San Francisco Ballet has been described as part of the "triumvirate of great classical companies defining the American style on the world stage today."

== History ==
=== Founding: Christensen brothers ===
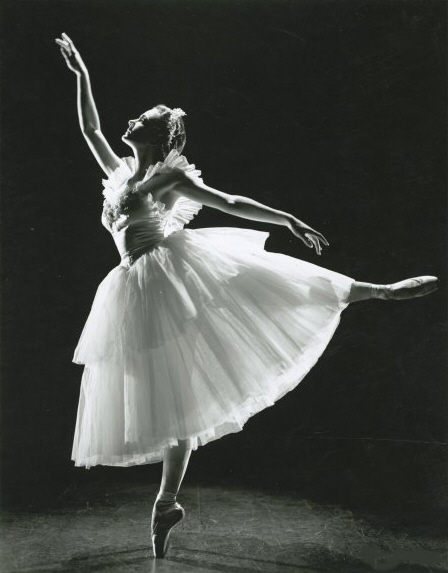
Jocelyn Vollmar dancing with the San Francisco Ballet in 1947

Willam Christensen, Harold Christensen, and Lew Christensen made up the famed trio of brothers considered by many to have done more than anyone else to establish ballet in the United States. Born into an artistic and musical family, the three brothers studied folk dance and ballet from early ages and went on to tour the famous vaudeville Orpheum Circuit during the 1920s and 1930s, exposing many Americans to ballet for the first time with their act "The Christ Brothers".

As vaudeville faded from American popular culture, Harold and Lew joined George Balanchine's new company, American Ballet, in 1935. In 1932, Willam formed a ballet school in Portland, Oregon; in 1937, he was engaged as principal male soloist by San Francisco Opera Ballet. He became the company's ballet master and choreographer in 1938. With his brother Harold, he purchased the company from the Opera in 1942, renaming it San Francisco Ballet. In 1951, Willam retired as director of SF Ballet and moved to Utah, where he started teaching ballet in the country's first university ballet department at the University of Utah. With a group of his students, he founded the Utah Civic Ballet (now known as Ballet West) in 1963; the company remained under Christensen's directorship until 1978.

Under Balanchine's tutelage at American Ballet, Lew Christensen became the first American-born danseur noble. The United States Army drafted Christensen to fight in World War II. After the war ended, he joined Balanchine's and Lincoln Kirstein's Ballet Society (soon to become New York City Ballet), eventually becoming ballet master; he served in the role from 1946 until 1950. In 1951, he joined his brother Willam as co-director of San Francisco Ballet. When Willam moved to Salt Lake City later that year, Lew took over as full director of SF Ballet; he held the position until 1976, when Michael Smuin joined him as co-director. Lew Christensen remained SF Ballet co-director until 1984, the year of his death.

After leaving the vaudeville circuit in 1935, Harold Christensen danced with American Ballet, San Francisco Opera Ballet, Kirstein's Ballet Caravan, and San Francisco Ballet until his retirement from the stage in 1946. In 1940, his brother Willam invited him to become director of the San Francisco Ballet School, and in 1942 he and Willam purchased the SF Ballet. Harold continued to serve as the school's director until his retirement in 1975.

Emmy Award winning choreographer and dancer James Starbuck was a principal dancer with the San Francisco Opera Ballet from 1935 to 1938; and left the company to become the first American man to dance with the Ballet Russe de Monte-Carlo.

=== 1938–1950 ===
In 1938, the company's first major production was Coppélia, choreographed by Willam Christensen. In 1940, it staged Swan Lake, the first time that the ballet was produced in its entirety by an American company. On Christmas Eve 1944, the company staged Nutcracker—the first complete production of Tchaikovsky's most popular piece ever danced in the United States.

In 1942, San Francisco Opera Ballet split into two independent companies, ballet and opera. The ballet half was sold to Willam and Harold Christensen. Willam became artistic director, while Harold took on the job of director of the San Francisco Ballet School. The San Francisco Ballet Guild was also formed as a support organization for San Francisco Ballet.

=== 1951–1972 ===
The year 1951 marked a significant shift in administration of San Francisco Ballet. Lew Christensen—premier danseur at the time—partnered with his brother Willam Christensen as co-directors. Then in 1952, Lew Christensen took over as sole director. Under his guidance, San Francisco Ballet began to travel and establish itself as a significant American ballet company. Until 1956, San Francisco Ballet had remained on the West Coast, but Christensen took the company to the Jacob's Pillow Dance Festival in Massachusetts. In 1957, it was the first American ballet company to tour the Far East, performing in 11 Asian nations. On New Year's Day 1965, ABC-TV televised a one-hour abridgement of the Lew Christensen-choreographed production of Nutcracker featuring San Francisco Ballet.

In 1972, San Francisco's War Memorial Opera House was named the official residence of San Francisco Ballet.

=== 1973–1985 ===
In 1973, Michael Smuin became co-artistic director of San Francisco Ballet with Lew Christensen; Smuin had danced with the Company from 1953 to 1961. Under his direction, the national and international profile of SF Ballet was raised significantly by the broad success of productions such as 1977's Romeo and Juliet, which aired on the PBS series Great Performances: Dance in America in 1978. This televised performance marked the first time that a West Coast ballet company, and a full-length ballet, was shown on the PBS TV series. PBS televised three more of Smuin's SF Ballet productions, and his productions of The Tempest and A Song for Dead Warriors went on to win Emmy Awards. Smuin led the company until 1985.

=== 1985–present ===
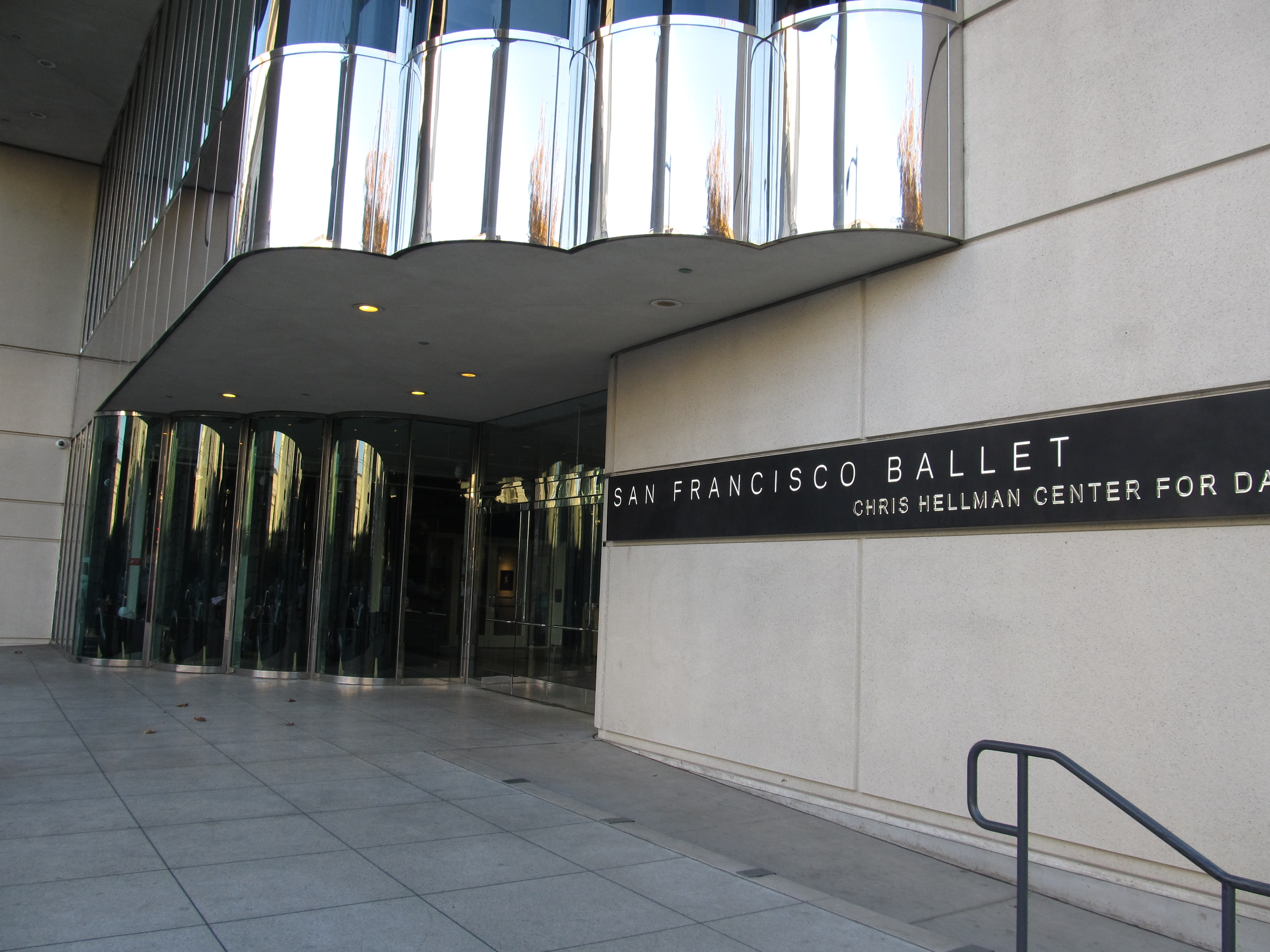
San Francisco Ballet Building, 2013

Helgi Tomasson's 1985 arrival as artistic director marked the beginning of a new era for San Francisco Ballet. Under Tomasson's direction, San Francisco Ballet has been recognized as one of the most innovative ballet companies in the world due to its early and frequent commissioning of new works by aspiring choreographers around the globe, the breadth of its repertory—spanning classical ballet, neoclassical ballet, and contemporary ballet—and the diversity of its company members. The Financial Times noted in 2012, "Tomasson ... helped shatter the distinction between the US top companies and so-called 'regional companies'".

Over a span of more than 25 years, Tomasson has staged acclaimed full-length productions of classics including Swan Lake (1988, 2009); The Sleeping Beauty (1990); Romeo and Juliet (1994); Giselle (1999); Don Quixote, co-staged with former principal dancer and current choreographer in residence Yuri Possokhov (2003); and Nutcracker (2004). Tomasson's Nutcracker, set in San Francisco during the 1915 Panama Pacific International Exposition, is notable for being the only uniquely San Francisco Nutcracker. It features sets (including "a backdrop of San Francisco's Victorian houses known as 'painted ladies'") and costumes created by, respectively, Michael Yeargan and Martin Pakledinaz, both repeat Tony Award-winning designers. Upon its premiere, The New York Times called Tomasson's Nutcracker "striking, elegant and beautiful".

Today, San Francisco Ballet presents approximately 100 performances each year. The company's diverse repertory includes works by Sir Frederick Ashton, George Balanchine, David Bintley, August Bournonville, Val Caniparoli, Lew Christensen, Nacho Duato, Jorma Elo, William Forsythe, James Kudelka, Jirí Kylián, Serge Lifar, Lar Lubovitch, Wayne McGregor, Agnes de Mille, Sir Kenneth MacMillan, Hans van Manen, Peter Martins, Mark Morris, Rudolf Nureyev, Marius Petipa, Roland Petit, Yuri Possokhov, Alexei Ratmansky, Jerome Robbins, Liam Scarlett, Paul Taylor, Helgi Tomasson, Antony Tudor, and Christopher Wheeldon.

In 2010, the Ballet's opening-night gala, Silver Celebration, honored Tomasson's 25 years as artistic director.

The Gala Opening of San Francisco Ballet's 80th Season included Tarantella pas de deux, L'Arlesienne solo, Flower Festival at Genzano pas de deux, In the Passerine's Clutch, Raymonda’s Act II solo, Trio second movement, Don Quixote grand pas de deux, Onegin Act 1 pas de deux, Stars and Stripes pas de deux, After the Rain pas de deux, and excerpts from Suite en Blanc.

San Francisco Ballet's 2013 season included Trio, Ghost and Borderlands as well as Suite en blanc, In the night, Nijinsky, The Rite of Spring, Onegin, Raymonda Act III and Cinderella.

The 2014 season included Giselle, A Midsummer Night's Dream, Tears, Borderlands, From Foreign Lands, Firebird, Ghosts, The Kingdom of the Shades from La Bayadère, Cinderella, Shostakovich Trilogy, Caprice, Maelstrom, The Rite of Spring, Hummingbird, The Fifth Season, Suite en Blanc, Agon, Brahms-Schoenberg Quartet, and Glass Pieces.

The 2015 season included Serenade, RAkU, Lambarena, Giselle, The Vertiginous Thrill of Exactitude, Variations for Two Couples, Manifesto, The Kingdom of the Shades from La Bayadère, Act II, Dances at a Gathering, Hummingbird, Don Quixote, Shostakovich Trilogy, Caprice, Swimmer, and Romeo & Juliet.

The 2017 season included "Haffner Symphony," "Fragile Vessels," "In the Countenance of Kings," "Seven Sonatas," "Optimistic Tragedy," "Pas/Parts 2016," "Frankenstein," "Stravinsky Violin Concerto," "Prodigal Son," "Diamonds," "Fusion," "Salome," "Fearful Symmetries," "Swan Lake," "Trio," "Ghost in the Machine," "Within the Golden Hour," and "Cinderella."

In January 2021, Tomasson announced that he would retire from the company in 2022. In 2022, Tamara Rojo succeeded Tomasson as artistic director.

== Programming ==
San Francisco Ballet performs repertory from January through May at the War Memorial Opera House in San Francisco. In addition, the company performs in July at the Stern Grove Festival in San Francisco, tours nationally in the summer and fall, and presents Nutcracker in December at the War Memorial Opera House.

=== Festivals and touring ===
In 1991, San Francisco Ballet performed in New York City for the first time in 26 years, returning in 1993, 1995, 1998, 2002, 2006, 2008, and 2013. Following the initial tour, The New York Times proclaimed, "Mr. Tomasson has accomplished the unprecedented: He has pulled a so-called regional company into the national ranks, and he has done so by honing the dancers into a classical style of astonishing verve and purity. San Francisco Ballet under Helgi Tomasson's leadership is one of the spectacular success stories of the arts in America."

In May 1995, San Francisco Ballet hosted 12 ballet companies from around the world for UNited We Dance: An International Festival. The festival commemorated the 50th anniversary of the signing of the United Nations Charter, which took place at the San Francisco War Memorial and Performing Arts Center.

In fall 2008, as part of the company's 75th anniversary celebration, San Francisco Ballet embarked on a critically acclaimed four-city American tour with engagements at Chicago's Harris Theater for Music and Dance, New York City Center, Southern California's Segerstrom Center for the Arts, and the John F. Kennedy Center for the Performing Arts in Washington, D.C. The year culminated in a New Works Festival of world premieres by 10 of the dance world's most acclaimed choreographers—Julia Adam, Val Caniparoli, Jorma Elo, Margaret Jenkins, James Kudelka, Mark Morris, Yuri Possokhov, Paul Taylor, Stanton Welch, and Christopher Wheeldon. Other anniversary initiatives included a commemorative book, San Francisco Ballet at Seventy-Five, and the broadcast of Tomasson's Nutcracker in December 2008 on the Great Performances: Dance in America series on PBS, produced in partnership with KQED Public Television in San Francisco.

San Francisco Ballet also performed in frequent overseas tours, including engagements at prestigious venues such as the famed Opéra de Paris-Palais Garnier in Paris (1994, 2001); London's Sadler's Wells Theatre (1999, 2004, 2012) and Royal Opera House in Covent Garden (2002); Athens' Megaron Theatre (2002) and Herod Atticus Amphitheatre (2004); Copenhagen's Tivoli Gardens (1998, 2010); and the Edinburgh International Festival at the Edinburgh Playhouse (1997, 2003). In fall 2009, San Francisco Ballet made its first trip to the People's Republic of China, with performances in Shanghai and Beijing.

In 2012, San Francisco Ballet embarked on the longest tour in the company's history, with engagements in London and Washington, DC, as well as first-time visits to Hamburg, Germany; Moscow; and Sun Valley, Idaho.

== Broadcast and media projects ==
In 1978, San Francisco Ballet's Michael Smuin-directed production of Romeo and Juliet became the first production by a West Coast ballet company, and the first full-length ballet, to be aired by the PBS Great Performances: Dance in America television series. Under the direction of Smuin, the ballet's 1981 production of The Tempest became the first ballet to be broadcast live (on PBS) from the War Memorial Opera House. Three years later, the 1984 PBS broadcast of the Ballet's performance of A Song for Dead Warriors earned Smuin an Emmy.

The fruitful relationship between PBS and SF Ballet continues to this day, with regular broadcasts of the Ballet's 2007 production of Nutcracker, choreographed by Helgi Tomasson. I Also in 2007, the Company had its first theatrical release with Nutcracker, shown in limited theaters in Canada, Australia, and the U.S. In 2011, theatrical distributor IndieNetFilms arranged for additional screenings throughout the U.S. and Canada.

In December 2011, the U.S. premiere of John Neumeier's The Little Mermaid, performed by San Francisco Ballet, was broadcast nationally on PBS's Great Performances: Dance in America, and also internationally. DVDs of the Nutcracker and The Little Mermaid performances were released in 2008 and 2011, respectively. CD recordings of the complete score of Nutcracker and Shinji Eshima's RAkU were released in 2010 and 2012, respectively.

== Accolades and awards ==
The company has garnered numerous accolades and awards. In 2005, San Francisco Ballet won its first Laurence Olivier Award, in the category of Outstanding Achievement in Dance, for its 2004 fall season at Sadler's Wells Theatre. Of the engagement, London's The Sunday Times proclaimed, "Helgi Tomasson's outstanding artistic direction ... has transformed a regional American troupe into one of the world's top ballet companies." In 2006, in a readers' poll conducted by Dance Europe magazine, San Francisco Ballet was the first non-European company to be voted "Company of the Year". In 2008, San Francisco Ballet received the Jerome Robbins Award for excellence in dance.

In 2012, Helgi Tomasson was named recipient of the Dance/USA Honor, acknowledging individuals' contributions to dance in America and the role they play in the national dance community. Most recently, San Francisco Ballet was nominated in the category of Outstanding Company by the 2014 National Dance Awards, based in the U.K.

== Company ==
=== Artistic director ===
- Tamara Rojo

=== Ballet masters and assistants to the artistic director ===
- Ricardo Bustamante
- Felipe Diaz

=== Ballet masters ===
- Tina LeBlanc
- Anita Paciotti
- Katita Waldo

=== Choreographer in residence ===
- Yuri Possokhov

=== Company teachers ===
- Helgi Tomasson
- Patrick Armand
- Ricardo Bustamante
- Felipe Diaz

=== Principal dancers ===
Name	Nationality	Training	Joined SFB	Promoted to principal	Other companies
Dores André	Spain	Antonio Almenara Estudio de Danza de Maria Avila	2004	2015; returned as principal in 2024	Ballett Zürich
Katherine Barkman	United States	Private Training with Nadia Pavlenko	2022	2026	Manila Ballet; The Washington Ballet
Max Cauthorn	United States	San Francisco Ballet School	2013	2020; returned as principal in 2024	Ballett Zürich
Frances Chung	Canada	Goh Ballet Academy	2001	2009	
Cavan Conley	United States		2018	2025	Tulsa Ballet; Tulsa Ballet II
Sasha De Sola	United States	Kirov Academy of Ballet	2007	2017	
Nikisha Fogo	Sweden	Royal Swedish Ballet School; The Royal Ballet School	2020	N/A (joined as principal)	Vienna State Ballet
Francesco Gabriele Frola	Italy	School of the Hamburg Ballet	2025	N/A (joined as principal)	National Ballet of Canada; English National Ballet
Esteban Hernandez	Mexico	The Rock School for Dance Education The Royal Ballet School	2013	2018	
Harrison James	New Zealand	New Zealand School of Dance San Francisco Ballet School Trainee Program	2024	N/A (joined as principal)	National Ballet of Canada Royal Winnipeg Ballet Béjart Ballet
Jasmine Jimison	United States	Bay Area Dance School; Menlo Park Academy of Dance; San Francisco Ballet School	2018	2024	
Wona Park	South Korea	Sunhwa Arts School; San Francisco Ballet School	2017	2020	
Jennifer Stahl	United States	Maria Lazar's Classical Ballet Academy San Francisco Ballet School	2006	2017	
Joseph Walsh	United States	Walnut Hill School of the Arts; Houston Ballet's Ben Stevenson Academy	2014	2014	Houston Ballet
Wei Wang	China	Beijing Dance Academy, San Francisco Ballet School	2013	2018	
Madeline Woo	United States	John Cranko Schule	2025	N/A (joined as principal)	Royal Swedish Ballet

=== Principal character dancers ===
- Joanna Berman
- Ricardo Bustamante
- Kristi Decamanida
- Jeffrey Lyons
- Pascal Molat
- Katita Waldo

=== First soloists ===
Name	Nationality	Training	Joined SFB	Promoted to first soloist	Other companies
Joshua Jack Price	Australia	Amanda Bollinger Dance Academy The Dance Centre San Francisco Ballet School Trainee Program	2018	2024	

=== Soloists ===
Name	Nationality	Training	Joined SFB	Promoted to soloist	Other companies
Kamryn Baldwin	United States	Hawaii State Ballet; Metropolitan Ballet Academy; San Francisco Ballet School	2015	2024	
Fernando Carratalá Coloma	Spain	Escuela Arantxa Arana Escuela Sofia Sancho; Escuela Victor Ullate	2024	N/A (joined as soloist)	Victor Ullate Ballet English National Ballet
Jihyun Choi	South Korea	San Francisco Ballet School	2022	2025	
Isabella DeVivo	United States	School of American Ballet; San Francisco Ballet School	2013	2017	
Luca Ferrò	Italy	Princess Grace School (Monaco Ballet)	2020	2025	
Carmela Mayo	United States	San Francisco Ballet School	2017	2024	
Ángel García Molinero	Spain		2025	N/A (joined as soloist)	Boston Ballet; Spanish National Dance Company
Sasha Mukhamedov	United Kingdom	Elmhurst School for Dance; The Royal Ballet School; Arts Educational School	2019	N/A (joined as soloist)	Dutch National Ballet
Elizabeth Powell	United States	Boston Ballet School; San Francisco Ballet School	2012	2018	
Victor Prigent	France	Paris Opera Ballet School Conservatoire National Supérieur de Musique et de Danse de Paris; Joffrey Academy Ballet Trainee Program; San Francisco Ballet School	2024	N/A (joined as soloist)	English National Ballet
Nathaniel Remez	United States	San Francisco Ballet School	2016	2025	
Julia Rowe	United States	Central Pennsylvania Youth Ballet; San Francisco Ballet School	2013	2016	Oregon Ballet Theatre
Myles Thatcher	United States	Margo Clifford Ging; The Harid Conservatory; Edward Ellison Professional Training Program; San Francisco Ballet School	2010	2020	
Alexis Francisco Valdes	Cuba	Escuela Nacional de Ballet Fernando Alonso; Academy of Arts; The HARID Conservatory; San Francisco Ballet School	2022	2026	
Mingxuan Wang	China	San Francisco Ballet School	2013	2025	
Lonnie Weeks	United States	Faubourg School of Ballet; Ruth Page Center for the Arts; Texas Ballet Theater School	2010	2018	Texas Ballet Theater
Seojeong Yun	South Korea	San Francisco Ballet School	2023	2025	

=== Demi soloists ===
Name	Nationality	Training	Joined SFB	Promoted to demi soloist	Other companies
Thamires Chiuvas	Brazil	San Francisco Ballet School	2014	2025	Companhia Jovem de Ballet do Rio de Janeiro
Rubén Cítores Nieto	Spain	AMPA Escuela Profesional Danza CyL Valladolid; San Francisco Ballet School	2019	2026	
Jacey Gailliard	United States	San Francisco Ballet School	2023	2026	
Lucas López	Spain	Joffrey Ballet Studio Company; Dutch National Ballet Academy; Real Conservatorio Profesional de Danza Mariemma	2024	2026	
Dylan Pierzina	United States	School of American Ballet; San Francisco Ballet School	2023	2025	
Simone Pompignoli	Italy	John Cranko School	2023	2025	Tulsa Ballet
Leili Rackow	United States	San Francisco Ballet School	2018	2026	
Adrian Zeisel	United States	San Francisco Ballet School	2019	2025	

=== Corps de ballet ===
- Sofia Albers
- Rebecca Blekinsop
- Samantha Bristow
- Olivia Brothers
- Maya Chandrashekaran
- Thamires Chuvas
- Carlota Cruz
- João Percilio da Silva
- Benjamin Davidoff
- Christiana De Blank
- Emmitt Friedman
- Parker Garrison
- Gabriela González
- Jakub Groot
- Lleyton Ho
- Andris Kundzins
- Katharine Lee
- Sunmin Lee
- Elizabeth Mateer
- Justin-Cooper Meeks
- Nicole Moyer
- Rimi Nakano
- Davide Occhipinti
- Pemberley Ann Olson
- Hui-Wen Peng
- Jasper True Stanford
- Anatalia St. Clair
- Tyla Steinbach
- Jamie Adele Stephens
- Archie Sullivan
- Benjamin Taber
- Angela Watson
- Maggie Weirich
- Juliana Wilder
- Juliette Windey

=== Apprentices ===
- Anna Chaziroglou
- Logi Gudmundsson
- Aaliyahmarie Key
- Logan Shaw
- Amelia Soh
- Asher Stephenson

== Official school ==
San Francisco Ballet School, San Francisco Ballet's official school, is America's oldest ballet school. The program includes classes in technique, pointe work, pas de deux, men's technique, contemporary dance, floor barre/conditioning, and character dance. Male and female students are placed in divisions according to age, experience, and ability. More than 50 percent of current San Francisco Ballet dancers received some training at San Francisco Ballet School.

=== History and directors ===
The school was founded in 1933 as part of the San Francisco Operatic and Ballet School when Gaetano Merola, the founder of the San Francisco Opera, perceived a need for an institution where dancers could be trained to perform in opera productions. The school was under the direction of ballet director Adolph Bolm from 1933 to 1938. Willam Christensen became director from 1938 to 1940, followed by his brother Harold Christensen from 1942 until 1975. Richard L. Cammack directed the school from 1975 to 1985; he oversaw the move to its current state-of-the-art facilities on Franklin Street in 1983. In 1985, new SF Ballet artistic director Helgi Tomasson appointed Nancy Johnson as school head. Lola de Avila joined as associate director from 1993 to 1999, followed by Gloria Govrin beginning in 1999. In 2006, de Avila returned to serve as associate director until 2012, when Patrick Armand stepped into the role.

=== School programs ===
Admission into the school is by audition only. Students may apply for financial aid and merit-based scholarships. Advanced students may be invited to join the SFBS Trainee Program, a one- to two-year pre-professional program established in 2004.

Up to 150 students are chosen by audition to dance in the yearly SF Ballet production of Nutcracker. The most advanced students may also dance with SF Ballet in the repertory season.

The school also runs a pre-ballet program for children ages 4–7; after completing the program, students of age who wish to continue study must audition in order to continue at the school.

=== Faculty ===
As of January 2017, it is led by the Artistic Director Helgi Tómasson and Director Patrick Armand.

== San Francisco Ballet Orchestra ==
The San Francisco Ballet Orchestra (SFBO) is the resident orchestra of the San Francisco Ballet. It was founded in 1975 and gave its debut performance in a production of the Nutcracker in the same year and has the distinction of what being one of the three major orchestras in the city.

SFBO toured with the SF Ballet's touring company from 1978 until 1984. It has accompanied many international ballet companies that have toured to the San Francisco Bay Area, including The Royal Ballet, the Royal Danish Ballet, Stuttgart Ballet, Hamburg Ballet, the Bolshoi Ballet, Paul Taylor Dance Company, American Ballet Theatre, and the Paris Opéra Ballet. In 1995, the orchestra took on the task of accompanying 13 international dance companies over the space of a single week in the UNited We Dance Festival.

The 49-member orchestra accompanies SF Ballet throughout its winter and spring repertory seasons. It also performs apart from the Company; it debuted solely as an orchestra in 1979 at the Herbst Theatre in San Francisco's War Memorial Veterans Building, playing a program that included works by Haydn, Ives, and Vivaldi.

=== Orchestra staff and musicians ===
The SFBO is composed of 49 members and headed by Martin West, music director and conductor. Founding Concertmaster and solo violinist Roy Malan retired in December, 2014, after serving for 40 years. After a rigorous search, Cordula Merks was appointed Concertmaster in 2016. As of February 2024, the musicians and staff included:

Violin I	
Cordula Merks, Concertmaster	Heeguen Song, Associate Concertmaster
Beni Shinohara, Assistant Concertmaster	Mariya Borozino
Minsun Choi	Robin Hansen
Heidi Wilcox	Wendi Shih, (Regular Substitute)
Violin II	
Ani Bukujian, Principal	Craig Reiss, Associate Principal
Jeanelle Meyer, Assistant Principal	Laura Keller
Jeremy Preston	Karen Shinozaki Sor, (Regular Substitute)
Viola	
Yi Zhou, Principal	Anna Kruger, Associate Principal
Joy Fellows, Assistant Principal	Caroline Lee
Elizabeth Prior, (Regular Substitute)
Cello	
Eric Sung, Principal	Jonah Kim, Associate Principal
Thalia Moore, Assistant Principal	Saul Richmond-Rakerd
Mariko Wyrick	Ruth Lane, (Regular Substitute)
Contrabass	
Jonathan Lancelle, Acting Principal	Shinji Eshima, Associate Principal
Mark Wallace, Assistant Principal (Regular Substitute)	Michael Minor, (Regular Substitute)
Flute	
Susan Kang, Principal	Julie McKenzie, 2nd & Piccolo
Oboe	
Laura Griffiths, Principal	Marilyn Coyne, 2nd & English Horn
Clarinet	
Sean Krissman, Principal	Eric Chi, 2nd & Bass Clarinet
Bassoon	
Rufus Olivier, Principal	Dana Jackson, 2nd & Contrabassoon (Season Substitute)
Horn	
Kevin Rivard, Principal	Brian McCarty, Associate Principal
Keith Green	Phillip Palmore
Caitlin Smith-Franklin, (Regular Substitute)	
Trumpet/Cornet	
Adam Luftman, Principal	Joseph Brown
Trombone	
Jeffrey Budin, Principal	Michael Cox
Bass Trombone	
Scott Thornton, Principal	
Tuba	
Peter Wahrhaftig, Principal	
Timpani	
Zubin Hathi, Principal	
Percussion	
David Rosenthal, Principal	
Harp	
Annabelle Taubl, Principal	

=== San Francisco Ballet Orchestra music directors ===
The orchestra was led by Denis de Coteau from 1975 until 1998, when de Coteau's battle with terminal cancer forced him to step down from the position. Emil de Cou, who had been serving as conductor since 1995, then assumed the role of music director, leading the Orchestra until 2001, when he left to join Washington D.C.'s National Symphony Orchestra. He was replaced by first associate conductor Jean-Louis LeRoux, who then left the interim position in 2003 and was succeeded by Andrew Mogrelia. In 2005, Mogrelia left in order to focus on his duties as music director at San Francisco Conservatory of Music. That same year, Martin West, frequent guest conductor for the Orchestra, stepped into the position of music director. In 2018 frequent guest conductor Ming Luke was appointed Principal Guest Conductor.

=== San Francisco Ballet Orchestra recordings ===
The orchestra's repertoire includes hundreds of works spanning four centuries of musical history, many of which have been recorded and released to great critical acclaim, including works by Beethoven, Bizet, and Delibes. Four of the orchestra's recordings have been televised on PBS's Great Performances: Dance in America.

Recordings include:

- Othello—Suite from the Ballet by Eliot Goldenthal (Varese Records)
- Tchaikovsky: Nutcracker (O'Brien Enterprises), 1988
- Schoenberg, Spohr, Elgar, Handel: Works for String Quartet & Orchestra (Arabesque Records)
- Claude Debussy: Rediscovered, Premiere Orchestral Recordings (Arabesque Records)
- RAkU (San Francisco Ballet Records)
- The Tempest—complete ballet by Paul Chihara: SF Ballet Orchestra recorded this under the name "Performing Arts Orchestra" in 1981 (Reference Recordings)
- Nutcracker Op. 71 (Koch Int'l Classics)
- Russian Masterpieces for Cello and Orchestra (Shostakovich Cello Concert, Tchaikovsky Rococo Variations, etc., Zuill Bailey, Cello) (Telarc)
- Delibes— Coppélia/Sylvia Extended Suites from the Ballets (Reference Recordings)
- Weber—Clarinet Concerti No. 1 & 2 (Alexander Fiterstein, Clarinet), (Bridge Records)
- Beethoven—Triple Concerto in C Major, Opus 56, Piano Trio in E-flat Major, Op. 1 No. 1 (Claremont Piano Trio), (Bridge Records)
- Bizet—Symphony in C major; Jeux D'Enfants; Variations chromatique (Reference Records)
- Yeston—Tom Sawyer—A Ballet in Three Acts (PS Classics)
- Karpman - Ask Your Mama - musical setting of Langston Hughes' Ask Your Mama: Twelve Moods for Jazz (Avie Records)
- Winger - Conversations With Nijinsky, Ghosts, A Parting Grace (VBI Classic Recording)

== Volunteer groups ==
San Francisco Ballet has a large network of volunteers who assist with the ongoing success of the Company and the San Francisco Ballet School.

More than 200 Ballet Resource and Volunteer Organization (BRAVO) volunteers donate over 10,000 volunteer hours every year, assisting with office duties, retail work, and the ballet's Center for Dance Education, as well as helping SF Ballet staff with receptions, fundraisers, the Spring Student Showcase, and other special events.

The San Francisco Ballet Auxiliary is a group of 100 women who volunteer to raise over $1 million in net contributions annually. In addition to individual fundraising, the group produces three annual productions: the Opening Night Gala, Fashion Show, and Student Showcase, with proceeds benefiting the Ballet and the San Francisco Ballet School.

San Francisco Ballet's Allegro Circle is a group of professional men and women who share a passion for dance and contribute their own personal, professional, and philanthropic resources toward developing a new and diverse generation of subscribers and patrons.

San Francisco Ballet's Young Patrons Circle, previously known as ENCORE!, is a social and philanthropic group of young professionals who are interested in deepening their relationship with San Francisco Ballet.

== See also ==
- List of productions of Swan Lake derived from its 1895 revival

== Articles ==
- John Martin (July 6, 1947). "The Dance: Chiefly out of Town; California, Utah, and New England Points Steal the Spotlight". The New York Times. p. 8 X.
- Hughes, Allen (May 5, 1963). "The San Francisco Ballet Grows Rapidly". The New York Times. p. 4 X.
