= San Francisco Ballet School =

American dance school

Coordinates: 37.77849°N 122.4218°W

General information
- Name: San Francisco Ballet School
- Previous names: San Francisco Operatic and Ballet School
- Year founded: 1933
- Founders: Gaetano Merola
- Principal venue: San Francisco Ballet Building; 455 Franklin Street; San Francisco, California 94102
- Website: school.sfballet.org

Senior staff
- Director: Grace Holmes
- Assistant director: Pascal Molat

San Francisco Ballet School was founded in 1933 as part of the San Francisco Operatic and Ballet School when Gaetano Merola, the founder of the San Francisco Opera, perceived a need for an institution where dancers could be trained to perform in opera productions.

== History ==
Under the direction of founding ballet director, Adolph Bolm, the San Francisco Operatic and Ballet School opened in 1933 and offered classes in ballet, tap, modern, and interpretive dance. The school was located in the William Taylor Hotel, with affiliate branch schools in nearby Bay Area locations Berkeley, Burlingame, Marin County, San Mateo, and Oakland. After Bolm left in 1937, new Opera ballet mistress Mildred Hirch added a fencing master during her year-long direction; Willam Christensen, previously director of the Oakland Branch School, became SF Opera ballet master and full school director in 1938.

As San Francisco Opera Ballet expanded its touring schedule, it became increasingly difficult for Christensen to serve in both of his professional capacities. In 1940, his brother Harold Christensen took over the position of school director. In 1942, the two Christensen brothers purchased both the ballet company and the school from the Opera Association, renaming the company San Francisco Ballet. Harold Christensen continued as director of the newly named San Francisco Ballet School until his retirement in 1975.

Under Harold Christensen, a nonprofessional curriculum flourished alongside its professional training, with programs targeted at students from very young children to working adults. However, the School became and remained a strictly classical academy for the 33 years that Christensen served as its head. This was particularly advantageous in light of the many directorial changes at SF Ballet, as school students who became company members were able to provide valuable continuity in the face of multiple directorial changes.

=== Ford Foundation support ===
The Ford Foundation established its first ballet training program in 1958; beginning in 1959, the Foundation offered grants covering tuition and expenses for advanced ballet students selected to attend either New York City Ballet's School of American Ballet or San Francisco Ballet School. In 1963, the Foundation then awarded a substantial ten-year grant to the SF Ballet School, establishing it, along with the School of American Ballet, as vocational schools of national stature. The grants awarded by the Foundation allowed the two schools to conduct nationwide auditions, with the SF Ballet School focusing on the Western states. When the grant ended, the School was able to support its own audition process, which has extended to include the Eastern U.S. since 1979.

=== Prix de Lausanne ===
San Francisco Ballet School has a longstanding relationship with the Prix de Lausanne, awarding full one-year scholarships to the winners of the Swiss-based competition.

== School programs ==
Admission to the school is by audition only. All students are accepted on a trial basis, with a yearly renewal process that involves evaluation by the faculty and associate director. Students may be awarded merit-based scholarships and Dance in Schools Continuing Scholarships by the School associate director, and they may apply for need-based financial aid.

=== School-year program ===
The School is in session from September to June, with students at Levels 1 through 3 attending classes two or three days a week and students at Level 4 and up attending five to six days a week. Advanced students must attend during the regular school day; many must make accommodations to their regular school schedules. The curriculum includes classes in contemporary dance, corps de ballet, music, conditioning/floor barre, and character dance. The program culminates in the year-end SF Ballet School Student Showcase, which offers the public an opportunity to experience the work of students at all levels of the School. Performance proceeds support the scholarship programs.

=== Stage experience ===
In addition to their performances in the annual Student Showcase at the end of the school year, students have other performance opportunities. Approximately 150 students are chosen by audition to dance in the yearly San Francisco Ballet production of Nutcracker. Students also have the opportunity to dance in productions such as Romeo and Juliet, The Sleeping Beauty, Giselle, Don Quixote, Coppélia, and Swan Lake. The most advanced students may also dance with SF Ballet in repertory and participate in company tours. Students may also have the opportunity to participate in performances of the San Francisco Opera and other ballet companies that tour the Bay Area.

=== Trainee Program ===
The San Francisco Ballet School Trainee Program, established in 2004, is a one- to two-year pre-professional program for advanced students who have been invited to join by San Francisco Ballet's artistic director and the School's associate director. Trainees ranging in age from 16 to 19 participate in daily classes, as well as rehearse and perform SF Ballet repertory and works staged specifically for them. Trainees also participate in workshops and in community outreach, and they perform regularly with San Francisco Ballet and throughout the Bay Area in a variety of settings, including some overseas.

=== Summer session ===
The School's summer session offers two programs for student dancers ages 12 to 18 at the intermediate and advanced/pre-professional levels. Program 1 is a three-week intermediate program. Program 2 is a four-week intensive program for advanced and pre-professional students.

=== Pre-ballet program ===
Prior to 2015, the School's Pre-ballet program was for children aged six and seven. Starting in 2015, the pre-ballet program was expanded to include classes for children aged four and five. Pre-ballet requires no audition, though class size is limited. The program's classes meet once a week; the children focus on basic ballet technique, proper body alignment, and musicality. After completing the program, students of age who wish to continue their studies must audition to enter the SF Ballet School at Level 1.

== Outreach and education ==
The San Francisco Ballet Center for Dance Education supports community programs touching over 25,000 people annually and donates over 4,000 tickets to the community.

=== Dance In Schools ===
Established in 1979, Dance in Schools and Communities (DISC) teaches dance and movement to 3,500 students in the San Francisco Unified School District. Of these students, 60-70 are chosen to attend San Francisco Ballet on a continuing education scholarship.

=== Community Matinees ===
Two times a season, San Francisco Ballet holds community matinees for students across the Bay Area. These matinees are shortened programs with excerpts of ballets the company is currently performing.

== Leadership ==
After the retirement of Harold Christensen in 1975, Richard L. Cammack was brought in as School director by the SF Ballet Company's new co-director, Michael Smuin. Under Cammack's leadership, SF Ballet School was federally approved for foreign students and received authorization from the California Department of Education. Cammack also oversaw the School's move to its current state-of-the-art facilities on Franklin Street in 1983.

When Helgi Tomasson became San Francisco Ballet's new artistic director and leader of the School in 1985, he appointed San Francisco Ballet ballerina Nancy Johnson as its head. In 1993, Lola de Avila was appointed to lead the School (Associate Director, SF Ballet School), and she held that position until 1999. When de Avila left, Gloria Govrin stepped into the position. De Avila returned in 2006 to serve as associate director until 2012. Patrick Armand was appointed associate director of the San Francisco Ballet School in September 2012, after serving for two years as principal of the SF Ballet School Trainee Program.

In 2023, San Francisco Ballet announced the appointment of Grace Maduell Holmes as Director of San Francisco Ballet School. An SF Ballet dancer for 12 years, Holmes returned to the company after serving as the director of the Kansas City Ballet School since 2014, where she oversaw all school programming and student performance opportunities.

== Notable alumni ==
Notable alumni of the school include:

- Val Caniparoli
- Misty Copeland
- Mireille Hassenboehler
- Drew Jacoby
- Sascha Radetsky
- Amanda Schull
- Yumiko Takeshima
- Jocelyn Vollmar
- Stanton Welch
