= Yumiko Takeshima =

Yumiko Takeshima (竹島 由美子, Takeshima Yumiko, born 1970) is a Japanese designer and former Principal dancer with Semperoper Ballett, Universal Ballet, the Alberta Ballet Company, Feld Ballet, and the Dutch National Ballet. Born in Asahikawa, Hokkaido, Takeshima began dancing at the age of four in Sapporo. At the age of thirteen, she studied at the San Francisco Ballet School in the United States. Takeshima continued to dance throughout the 90s and early 2000s and started designing dancewear and costumes for ballet companies from all over the world.

Takeshima founded the dancewear company YUMIKO and the YumiGirl Network in 2002. Her dancewear was used in Darren Aronofsky’s 2010 award-winning film Black Swan. She was the 2003 and 2005 recipient of the 'Best Female Dancer Award' by Dance Europe Magazine and won a gold medal at the 1996 Serge Lifar International Ballet Competition in Kyiv.

== Early life and training ==
Takeshima was born on 5 August 1970 in Asahikawa, Hokkaido, Japan and grew up in Ebetsu, Hokkaido. Her grandfather and parents owned a small kimono shop. She has often cited this as being the beginning of her inspirations for her later work as a designer. At the age of four, she began her ballet training at the Miharu Ishikawa Ballet School. At the age of thirteen, she was accepted into the San Francisco Ballet School.

== Career ==
Takeshima danced with Universal Ballet in Korea, the Alberta Ballet Company in Canada, and the Feld Ballet in the United States. In 1993, she moved to Holland and joined the Dutch National Ballet in 1993. In 2006, Aaron Watkin, the director of the Semperoper Ballett, based in Dresden, Germany, asked Takeshima to join the company as a Principal dancer. Takeshima was a long time dance partner of Watkin and agreed to join the newly revisioned company.

Takeshima begin sketching designs for leotards and experimenting with various fabrics in her free time as a dancer when she exchanged a toaster for a sewing machine. At the time, other dancers in the company took notice and soon began asking for custom body suits of their own. Takeshima founded the dancewear brand YUMIKO in 2002 which has stores in New York, Spain, Germany, and Japan. Design workshops and clothing production for the brand is done in Cazalla de la Sierra in the Province of Seville, Spain.

As a costume designer, Takeshima has designed for choreographers George Balanchine, David Dawson, Jorma Elo, Krzysztof Pastor, Alexei Ratmansky, Annabelle Lopez Ochoa, and William Forsythe; for ballet companies such as The Royal Ballet, Finnish National Ballet, Scottish Ballet, Boston Ballet, Vienna State Ballet, Polish National Ballet, Norwegian National Ballet, Royal Ballet of Flanders, Mariinsky Ballet, Pacific Northwest Ballet, West Australian Ballet, Raiford Rogers Modern Ballet, and Semperoper Ballett; and her dancewear was featured in the Darren Aronofsky’s 2010 award winning film Black Swan. Her designs have been called “elegant, simple and among the most beautiful dance costumes in the European dance scene.” Takeshima's first design and collaboration was with Dawson for the Dutch National Ballet in 2000.

Takeshima was the 2003 and 2005 recipient of the 'Best Female Dancer Award' by Dance Europe Magazine and won a gold medal at the 1996 Serge Lifar International Ballet Competition in Kyiv. Takeshima has also performed at numerous galas such as multiple performances at the International Ballet Star Gala at the National Theater and Concert Hall, Taipei. In April 2014, Takeshima retired from dancing. Her final performance was in Dawson's classical ballet Giselle, a ballet created on Takeshima and in which she also designed the costumes.

== Personal life ==
Takeshima is married to Mark Mahler Gomez who helped her co-found YUMIKO.
