= Harald Lander =

Danish ballet dancer and choreographer

Harald Alfred Bernhardt Stevnsborg Lander (25 February 1905 – 14 September 1971) was a Danish dancer, choreographer and artistic director of the Royal Danish Ballet.

== Biography ==
Lander was born in Copenhagen. He started as a dancer, studying under ballet master Michel Fokine in 1926–27, and danced various principal roles until his retirement in 1945.

During his tenure as artistic director and ballet master of the Royal Danish Ballet from 1932 to 1951, he enriched the company's repertoire with productions of Fokine's iconic masterpieces and Bournonville revivals.

Lander was married three times, first to Margot Lander (1930–1950), then to Toni Lander ( −1965), and finally to Lise Lander.

His most famous choreographic work, Études, which later brought him international fame, is considered an homage to classical ballet training. Études is a one-act ballet that begins with traditional ballet exercises at a barre and ends with spectacular bravura displays.

Lander became ballet master of the Paris Opera Ballet in 1953 and opened his own studio in Paris in 1964. He was decorated by the governments of Denmark, Belgium, and France for his contributions to ballet. Lander returned to Copenhagen shortly before his death in 1971.

== See also ==
- List of ballets by Harald Lander
