= The Moor's Pavane =

Ballet based on Othello

- Choreographer: José Limón
- Premiere: August 17, 1949

The Moor's Pavane is a 20-minute ballet based upon the tragedy Othello by William Shakespeare. The ballet was choreographed by José Limón in 1949 to music from Henry Purcell's Abdelazer, The Gordion Knot Untied, and the pavane from Pavane and Chaconne for Strings, arranged by Simon Sadoff. This ballet is José Limón's most famous work and his influence from Doris Humphrey is evident in his choreography. It was created on the Limón Company.

There are only four dancers who appear in this rendition of Othello. These dancers represent The Moor, originally played by Limón himself, Desdemona, originally played by Betty Jones, Iago, originally played by Lucas Hoving, and Emilia, originally played by Pauline Koner. Desdemona, an innocent character and tragic victim, is betrayed by Iago who hints that she has been unfaithful. This causes Othello to murder her. These dramatic actions and events take place in the form of a pavane, which is a type of courtly dance. The stately and formal choreography provides a stark contrast to the emotional and passionate characters and the violent story.

The work premiered at the Connecticut College American Dance Festival on August 17, 1949. American Ballet Theatre was the first company outside Limon's company to include the work in its repertory. Notable interpreters of the Moor include Rudolf Nureyev and Cynthia Gregory.

Since its creation, The Moor's Pavane has been added to the repertories of many different companies, including major ballet companies, showing the fading divisive line between modern dance and ballet.
