= Stephen Galloway =

American dancer

Stephen R Galloway
- Born: Columbia, Tennessee
- Occupations: Dancer, choreographer, costume designer, creative consultant
- Years active: 1986–present
- Known for: Ballet Frankfurt

Stephen Galloway is an American dancer known for his tenure as a principal dancer at the Ballet Frankfurt. He is a costume designer and has made costume for the American Ballet Theatre and the Paris Opera. He serves as a creative consultant and choreographer for The Rolling Stones and regularly collaborates with the Dutch fashion photographer duo Inez van Lamsweerde and Vinoodh Matadin.

== Early life ==
Galloway was born in Columbia, Tennessee but moved to Erie, Pennsylvania at a young age. Growing up in Erie, he was part of a neighborhood program created by local African American leaders and city officials, named in honor of Martin Luther King Jr., that provided dance (via Erie Bayfront Ballet), and art classes (via Culture House), to the local children. Galloway, along with the other boys in the program, were asked to join the dance class that sought more participation from the boys. Despite the lack of previous formal training, his natural talent in dance caught the attention of the instructors and Galloway was subsequently asked to join the most advanced dance class in the program, further spiking his interest in dance. He enrolled at the ballet school and graduated from Strong Vincent High school with a scholarship in the arts.

== Career ==
=== Ballet Frankfurt ===
As his scholarship was in the form of a grant, Galloway decided to leave America for Europe in hopes of studying under more influential choreographers of the time. He eventually moved to Frankfurt and joined Frankfurt Ballet at the age of 17, just when American choreographer William Forsythe took over. He held his position as a principal dancer for 18 years, from 1986 to 2004, under Forsythe.

=== Costume design ===
Galloway's interest in fashion formed early in his childhood. He started reading Vogue in the third grade and asked his mother to get a subscription for Viva magazine. His interests in fashion remained strong through his years at Ballet Frankfurt. William Forsythe was familiar with Galloway's interest in fashion and started assigning Galloway with the task of designing costumes. In 1990, he was appointed as style coordinator and head costume designer. During his tenure as the head costume designer, he received a Bessie Award for best costumes for his work on a dance piece Eidos: Telos which was choreographed by Forsythe. Since his departure from Ballet Frankfurt, Galloway has been working as a freelance costume designer and continues to produce costumes for ballets and operas for institutions such as Kirov Ballet of St. Petersburg, American Ballet Theatre. La Scala, Paris Opera Ballet, and Théâtre du Capitole. In 1993, Galloway was appoint as the creative director of Issey Miyake. He served the position until 1997.

=== The Rolling Stones and Mick Jagger ===
Mick Jagger got in touch with Galloway through mutual friends and asked him to join The Rolling Stones tour. Although Galloway was only credited as a choreographer on his backstage pass, he served a fluid and a general role overseeing the aesthetic of the whole tour, giving notes on anything from lighting and clothing to choreography. Soon, Galloway's role spanned over to other areas such as consulting on The Rolling Stones' music videos. Reflecting his multi-faceted contribution to The Rolling Stones team, Jagger gave Galloway various titles such as 'movement consultant', 'stage shaker', and 'the clean-up crew'.

=== Fashion ===
Two of the longstanding collaborators of Galloway are the Dutch fashion photographer duo Inez van Lamsweerde and Vinoodh Matadin. Inez and Vinnodh enlist Galloway as a creative movement consultant for fashion editorials such as Vogue Paris, Vogue and W Magazine, as well as campaigns for the brands such as Gucci, Calvin Klein, and Yves Saint Laurent. On set with Lamsweerde and Matadin, using his expertise in body movements gained during his time as a ballet dancer, Galloway has helped some of the top models including Raquel Zimmermann, Natasha Poly, Jessica Miller, and Christy Turlington. Galloway's work as a creative movement consultant helped to shape unique visual aesthetic in Lamsweerd and Matadin's work, which came to be some of the most iconic images of contemporary fashion photography.

Galloway's insight in fashion was not only appreciated by the photographers but also by the fashion designers themselves. He has been asked to oversee the production of runway shows for many fashion houses, such as Versace, Yves Saint Laurent, and Costume National.
