= Margot Lander =

Danish ballet dancer

Margot Ella Florentz Lander (23 August 1910 – 18 July 1961), a prima ballerina with the Royal Danish Ballet, was the most important Danish ballerina of the first half of the twentieth century.

Born in Oslo to Ella Florentz (1891-?), an opera singer, and Marx Gerharh (1871–1938), a journalist, Lander began studying at the Royal Danish Ballet School in 1917 and joined the Royal Danish Ballet in 1928. Two years later she married Harald Lander (1905–1971), a dancer and choreographer who became the ballet-master at the Royal Danish Ballet. They divorced in 1946.

Margot Lander became principal dancer in 1933 and Denmark's first prima ballerina in 1942. She danced key roles in Harald Lander's ballets, in August Bournonville's repertoire as well as in Coppélia and Swan Lake before retiring in 1950. She was also the ballet instructor of former queen of Greece Anne Marie.
