= Ballet West =

American ballet company

General information
- Name: Ballet West
- Year founded: 1963
- Founders: Willam F. Christensen; Glenn Walker Wallace
- Website: www.balletwest.org

Artistic staff
- Artistic director: Adam Sklute

Other
- Official school: Ballet West Academy
- Formation: Principal Artists; Soloists; Demi-Soloists; Artists

Ballet West is an American ballet company based in Salt Lake City, Utah. It was founded in 1963 as the Utah Civic Ballet by Willam F. Christensen, the company's first artistic director, and Glenn Walker Wallace, who served as its first president. Christensen had previously established the first ballet department in an American university at the University of Utah in 1951.

In 1968, the Federation of Rocky Mountain States chose the company to represent that group, and by extension, to represent the western United States. Due to that choice, the group's name was changed to Ballet West. This is not to be confused with Ballet West in Taynuilt, Scotland.

The Ballet West Academy is the official school of Ballet West and is located in Salt Lake City.

Ballet West was featured in the reality TV series Breaking Pointe in the Summer of 2012 and 2013 aired on the CW Network, part of a BBC Production.

== History of Ballet West ==
Ballet West was established in Salt Lake City in 1963. Willam F. Christensen was the company's first artistic director, co-founding the company together with Utah's “First Lady of the Arts” Glenn Walker Wallace. In 1951, Christensen had established the first ballet department in an American university at The University of Utah and with the tireless assistance of Mrs. Enid Cosgriff this program grew into the Utah Civic Ballet, Ballet West's first incarnation. But this was not the first ballet company Willam Christensen's founded. Along with his brothers Lew and Harold, Christensen made history by establishing the oldest ballet company in the western United States, the San Francisco Ballet. There he went on to create the first full-length American productions of Coppélia, Swan Lake, and The Nutcracker, which remains in Ballet West's repertoire to this day.

A 20th Century ballet pioneer, Christensen developed a distinctly American and theatrical repertoire for his company based on his early training in Utah and New York City as well as his years traversing the American Vaudeville circuit. He also built a strong connection to the works of George Balanchine. In 1975 Christensen invited the great American dancer Bruce Marks to join him as Ballet West's Co-Artistic Director. Marks became Artistic Director in 1978 when Christensen retired. Under Marks’ direction, the company presented its first full production of Swan Lake and it earned a reputation for developing emerging choreographers of the time. Also during this period Marks made history, along with his wife, the acclaimed Danish Ballerina, Toni Lander, by presenting the first American full-length production of Abdallah by renowned 19th Century Danish choreographer, August Bournonville. John Hart, CBE, former dancer, administrator, and Assistant Director of The Royal Ballet in England succeeded Marks as Artistic Director of Ballet West In 1985. Under his leadership, the company's repertoire was expanded to include more well-loved 19th Century classics such as The Sleeping Beauty. Hart further enriched the company's repertoire of ballets with the works of many early 20th Century masters, most notably the great English choreographer, Sir Frederick Ashton. From 1985 to 1996, Hart engaged San Francisco-based Val Caniparoli as Ballet West's resident choreographer. Dancer and choreographer Jonas Kåge served as Artistic Director from 1997 to 2006. During this time Kåge maintained Ballet West's repertoire of classics while revitalizing its profile with notable late 20th Century choreographers such as Christopher Bruce, Hans van Manen, Glen Tetley and William Forsythe.

== Artistic directors ==
The founding artistic director, Willam Christensen, retired in 1978. He was succeeded by Bruce Marks, who had been co-artistic director since 1975. Starting in 1985, the company's third artistic director was John Hart, CBE, a former dancer, administrator, and assistant director of The Royal Ballet. From 1997 through 2006, the position belonged to Jonas Kåge, a dancer and choreographer.

The company's fifth and current artist director is Adam Sklute, who has served in that capacity since 2007. Sklute was dancer, ballet master and associate director with The Joffrey Ballet.

== Dance company ==
Dancers with Ballet West as of August 2025 include:

=== Principal Dancers ===
Name	Nationality	Training	Joined Ballet West	Promoted to Principal
Emily Adams	United States	School of American Ballet; Studio Maestro; Ballet Technique; Princeton Ballet	2007	2015
Katlyn Addison	United States	National Ballet School of Canada, Quinte Ballet School of Canada, Pacific Northwest Ballet School, Boston ballet, and Houston Ballet Ben Stevenson Academy	2010	2021
Hadriel Dinz	Brazil	Guiomar Boaventura at the Vortice Escola de Dancas	2015	2021
Adrian Fry	United States	Omaha Theater Ballet School; School of American Ballet; Pacific Northwest Ballet School	2010	2017
Tyler Gum	United States	Ballet Society of Colorado Springs; Pacific Northwest Ballet School	2010	2023
David Huffmire	United States	Ballet West Academy	2018	2024
Jenna Rae Herrera	United States	She trained under Cynthia Young, Lawrence Blake, and Randall Graham	2010	2021
Amy Potter	United States	Nutmeg Conservatory for the Arts	2012, 2021	2022
Jordan Veit	United States	Pacific Northwest Ballet School	2013	2022

=== Soloists ===
Name	Nationality	Training	Joined Ballet West	Promoted to Soloist
Dominic Ballard	Australia	Australian Ballet School	2017	2025
Vinicius Lima	Brazil	Ballet West Academy	2020	2025
Rylee Ann Rogers	United States	The School of American Ballet and the Professional Performing Arts High School	2022	2025
Victoria Vassos	Switzerland, Greece	Staatliche Ballettschule Berlin	2019	2023

=== Demi-soloists ===
Name	Nationality	Training	Joined Ballet West	Promoted to Demi-Soloist
Lillian Casscells	United States	The School of American Ballet	2017	2024
Jacob Hancock	United States	Ballet West Academy	2022	2025
Joseph Lynch	United States	The Rock School for Dance Education and Boston Ballet School.	2019	2025
Nicole Fannéy	United States	International Ballet Academy, Paris Opera Ballet School	2020	2023
Lexi McCloud	United States	MOGA Conservatory of Dance	2024	2025
Jake Preece	Canada	Goh Ballet Academy; Pacific Northwest Ballet School	2019	2022
Anisa Sinteral	United States		2015, 2021	2025
Loren Walton	United States	Ballet West Academy	2022	2025

=== Corps de Ballet ===
- Olivia Book
- Alexis Bull
- Jazz Khai Bynum
- Kai Casperson
- Kye Cooley
- Isabella Corridon
- Anderson Duhan
- Jaya Dhand
- Maren Florence
- Robert Fowler
- Lund Fuller
- Victor Galeana
- Mikayla Gyfteas
- Tea Hinchley
- James Jobson-Larkin
- Schuyler Lian
- William Lynch
- Jonas Malinka-Thompson
- Claire Spainhour
- Kyra Stafford

=== Ballet West II, Second Company Artists ===
- Carly Allyn
- Calder Feinstein
- Adrian Fite
- Pieter Gunning
- Callia Herbert
- Mirin Hirano
- Melanie McIntire
- Mario Mery
- Sophia Nanni
- Aubri Parker
- Mateo Salinas
- Zoe Wilson
- Annalise Wood

=== Notable Dancers ===
Name	Rank	Date Joined	Date Left
Beckanne Sisk	Principal	2011	2022
Chase O'Connell	Principal	2013	2022
Allison Debona	First Soloist	2007	2022
Christopher Sellers	First Soloist	2006	2019
Christopher Ruud	Principal	1998	2019
Rex Tilton	Principal	2008	2022
Kathrine Lawrence	Principal	2004	2021
Elizabeth Weldon	Soloist	2009	2018
Jeff Rogers	Principal	1980	2000
Max Hall	BW II	2002	2010
Silver Barkes	Corps de Ballet	2004	2012
Jane Wood	Principal	1981	2001
