= Willam Christensen =

American ballet dancer and choreographer (1902–2001)

Willam Farr Christensen
- Born: August 27, 1902; Brigham City, Utah, United States
- Died: October 14, 2001 (aged 99); Salt Lake City, Utah, United States
- Occupations: Ballet dancer, choreographer, artistic director
- Known for: Founder of San Francisco Ballet and Ballet West, bringing "The Nutcracker" to the U.S.

Willam Farr Christensen (August 27, 1902 – October 14, 2001) was an American ballet dancer, choreographer and founder of the San Francisco Ballet and Ballet West in Salt Lake City, Utah. He is known for bringing the complete version of the Russian ballet The Nutcracker to the United States, as well as staging the first American performances of Swan Lake and Coppélia. Christensen's Nutcracker was first staged in 1944 in San Francisco, where the ballet remains an annual tradition, though the production now staged there is not necessarily the Christensen version. Christensen is often credited with helping to rejuvenate American dance.

Christensen left the San Francisco Ballet in the care of his brother, Harold, to help choreograph a stage production at the University of Utah in the summer of 1948. While there, he was asked to stay on and help the University create a department of ballet. He agreed, and spent the remainder of his life working in Utah and the Intermountain West. The University of Utah was the first accredited University to have a ballet department in the U.S. While in Utah, Christensen also founded Ballet West. Author Debra H. Sowell wrote that Willam, Harold, and Lew Christensen are the closest thing the United States has to a European-style "ballet dynasty". Christensen was raised in Brigham City, Utah and was a member of the Church of Jesus Christ of Latter-day Saints.
