= List of San Francisco Ballet 2017 repertory =

San Francisco Ballet dances each year at the War Memorial Opera House, San Francisco, and tours; this is the list of 2017 San Francisco Ballet repertory season with ballets and casts beginning with the opening night gala, Thursday, January 19, 2017. The 2017 season is the company's 84th. The Nutcracker is danced the year before.

== 2017 Gala "Ever Magical" ==
Thursday, January 19, 2017,

The program for the gala

- Foragers by Myles Thatcher
- Pas de deux from Promenade Sentimentale by Liam Scarlett
- Pas de trois from Agon by George Balanchine
- Valses Poeticos by Helgi Tómasson
- World Premiere Presentce by Trey McIntyre
- Pas de deux from Flames of Paris by Vasili Vainonen
- World Premiere The Chairman Dances by Benjamin Millepied
- "Purple" from Terra Firma by James Kudelka
- "Boogie Woogie Bugle Boy (of Company B)" from Company B by Paul Taylor
- Pas de deux from La Cathedrale Engloutie by Stanton Welch
- Diamonds by George Balanchine

== Programs ==
=== Program one, Jan 24 - Feb 4 Mixed program "The Joy of Dance" ===
- Haffner Symphony by Helgi Tomasson
- Fragile Vessels, a world premiere by Jiří Bubeníček
- In The Countenance of Kings by Justin Peck

=== Program two, Jan 26 - Feb 5 Mixed program "Modern Masters" ===
- Seven Sonatas by Alexei Ratmansky
- Optimistic Tragedy, a world premiere by Yuri Possokhov
- Pas/Parts 2016 by William Forsythe

=== Program three, Feb 17 - Feb 26 Full-Length "Frankenstein" ===
- Frankenstein by Liam Scarlett

=== Program four, Mar 7 - Mar 18 Mixed program "Must-See Balanchine" ===
- Stravinsky Violin Concerto
- Prodigal Son
- Diamonds

Each piece choreographed by George Balanchine

=== Program five, Mar 9 - Mar 19 Mixed program "Contemporary Voices" ===
- Fusion, by Yuri Possokhov
- Salome, a world premiere by Arthur Pita
- Fearful Symmetries, by Liam Scarlett

=== Program six, Mar 31 - Apr 12 Full-Length "Swan Lake" ===
- Swan Lake

=== Program seven, Apr 5 - Apr 18 Mixed Program "Made for SF Ballet" ===
- Trio by Helgi Tomasson
- Ghost in the Machine, a world premiere by Myles Thatcher
- Within the Golden Hour© by Christopher Wheeldon

=== Program eight, Apr 28 - May 7 Full length "Cinderella" ===
- Cinderella by Christopher Wheeldon

== 2017 Company Roster ==
The company of the San Francisco Ballet:

=== Changes from 2016 season ===
==== Promotions and Additions ====
- In May 2016, the company announced the following promotions and additions:
  - Soloist Carlo Di Lanno was promoted to principal dancer.
  - Corps de Ballet members Francisco Mungamba, Julia Rowe, Wei Wang, and WanTing Zhao became soloists.
  - Apprentice Blake Kessler joined the corps de ballet.
  - Aaron Robison, formerly a soloist with Houston Ballet, joined as principal dancer.
  - Angelo Greco joined as soloist. Greco previously danced with La Scala Ballet. Greco was subsequently promoted to principal in February 2017.
  - Elizabeth Mateer (from Pennsylvania Ballet II and Natasha Sheehan (from the San Francisco Ballet Trainee program) joined as corps de ballet members.
  - Ludmila Bizalion, formerly Ludmila Campos returned to the corps de ballet. Bizalion was with the San Francisco Ballet as an apprentice in 2006 and a member of the corps de ballet from 2007 to 2010. Before returning, she danced with Royal Ballet of Flanders, Hong Kong Ballet, Diablo Ballet, and Smuin Ballet.
  - Five SF Ballet School Trainees were promoted to the rank of apprentice: Alexandre Cagnat, Shené Lazarus, Davide Occhipinti, Nathaniel Remez, and Isabella Walsh.
- Former corps members Gaetano Amico III and Grace Shibley were removed from the company roster.
- Former corps member Kristine Butler joined Bucharest National Opera Ballet Company of Romania.
- Megan Amanda Ehrlich returned to the Company in 2017 after leaving to dance with Grand Rapids Ballet in 2016.
- Former corps member Aaron Renteria joined The Joffrey Ballet in 2016.
- Five former apprentices moved on from the company:
  - Chisako Oga joined Cincinnati Ballet
  - Grace Choi joined Tulsa Ballet II.
  - Haruo Niyama joined The Washington Ballet.
  - Anastasia Kubanda and Francisco Sebastião were removed from the company roster.
- Soloist Sasha De Sola was promoted to principal dancer, effective January 1, 2017.
- San Francisco Ballet announced the following mid-season promotions:
  - Soloist Jennifer Stahl was promoted to the rank of principal dancer, effective July 1, 2017
  - Max Cauthorn was promoted to soloist
  - Isabella DeVivo, Jahna Frantziskonis, Esteban Hernandez, and Steven Morse were promoted to soloists, effective July 1, 2017.

=== Dancers ===
==== Principal Dancers ====
Name	Nationality	Training	Other Companies	Principal Since	Notes
Dores André	Spain	Estudio de Danza de Maria Avila		2015	
Jaime Garcia Castilla	Spain	Royal Conservatory of Professional Dance		2008	
Frances Chung	Canada	Goh Ballet Academy		2009	
Sasha De Sola	United States	Kirov Academy of Ballet		2017	
Carlo Di Lanno	Italy	La Scala Ballet School	La Scala Ballet; Staatsballett Berlin	2016	
Taras Domitro	Cuba	Cuban National Ballet School	National Ballet of Cuba	2008	
Lorena Feijoo	Cuba	Cuban National Ballet School	National Ballet of Cuba; Royal Ballet of Flanders; Joffrey Ballet	1999	
Mathilde Froustey	France	Marseille National School of Ballet; Paris Opéra Ballet School	Paris Opéra Ballet	2013	
Angelo Greco	Italy	La Scala Ballet Academy	La Scala Ballet	2017	Won the Erik Bruhn Prize in 2016
Tiit Helimets	Estonia	Tallinn Ballet School	Estonian National Ballet; Birmingham Royal Ballet	2005	
Luke Ingham	Australia	Australian Ballet School	The Australian BalletHouston Ballet	2014	
Davit Karapetyan	Armenia	Armenian School of Ballet; Schweizerische Ballettberufsschule	Zurich Ballet	2005	Named John and Barbara Osterweis Principal Dancer
Maria Kochetkova	Russia	Moscow State Academy of Choreography	The Royal Ballet; English National Ballet	2007	Named Herbert Family Principal Dancer
Vitor Luiz	Brazil	The Royal Ballet School	Birmingham Royal Ballet	2009	
Carlos Quenedit	Cuba	Cuban National Ballet School	Cuban National BalletMiami City Ballet Joffrey Ballet	2014	
Aaron Robison	Great Britain	Institut del Teatre The Royal Ballet School	Birmingham Royal Ballet Corella Ballet Castilla y Leon Houston Ballet	2016	
Sofiane Sylve	France	Centre de Danse l’Académie	Dutch National Ballet; New York City Ballet	2008	
Yuan Yuan Tan	China	Shanghai Dance School John Cranko School		1997	Named Richard C. Barker Principal Dancer
Sarah Van Patten	United States	Ballet Workshop of New England; Massachusetts Youth Ballet	Royal Danish Ballet	2007	Named Diana Dollar Knowles Principal Dancer
Joseph Walsh	United States	Walnut Hill School of the Arts; Houston Ballet II	Houston Ballet	2014	
Vanessa Zahorian	United States	Kirov Academy of Ballet; Central Pennsylvania Youth Ballet	Mariinsky Ballet	2002	Named Diane B. Wilsey Principal Dancer

==== Principal character dancers ====
- Ricardo Bustamante
- Val Caniparoli
- Rubén Martín Cintas
- Anita Paciotti

==== Soloists ====
- Max Cauthorn
- Daniel Deivison-Oliveira
- Koto Ishihara
- Francisco Mungamba
- Julia Rowe
- James Sofranko
- Jennifer Stahl
- Lauren Strongin
- Anthony Vincent
- Wei Wang
- Hansuke Yamamoto
- WanTing Zhao

==== Corps de Ballet ====
- Kamryn Baldwin
- Sean Bennett
- Ludmila Bizalion
- Samantha Bristow
- Thamires Chuvas
- Diego Cruz
- Isabella DeVivo
- Megan Amanda Ehrlich
- Jahna Frantziskonis
- Benjamin Freemantle
- Jordan Hammond
- Jillian Harvey
- Esteban Hernandez
- Ellen Rose Hummel
- Blake Kessler
- Elizabeth Mateer
- Norika Matsuyama
- Lee Alex Meyer-Lorey
- Steven Morse
- Kimberly Marie Olivier
- Sean Orza
- Lauren Parrott
- Elizabeth Powell
- Alexander Reneff-Olson
- Rebecca Rhodes
- Emma Rubinowitz
- Skyla Schreter
- Natasha Sheehan
- Henry Sidford
- Miranda Silveira
- John-Paul Simoens
- Myles Thatcher
- Mingxuan Wang
- Lonnie Weeks
- Maggie Weirich
- Ami Yuki

==== Apprentices ====
These SF Ballet School Trainees were promoted to the rank of apprentice:

- Alexandre Cagnat
- Shené Lazarus
- Davide Occhipinti
- Nathaniel Remez
- Isabella Walsh

==== Artistic Staff ====
- Artistic Director & Principal Choreographer: Helgi Tomasson
- Ballet Master & Assistant to the artistic director: Ricardo Bustamante
- Ballet Masters
  - Felipe Diaz
  - Betsy Erickson
  - Anita Paciotti
  - Katita Waldo
- Company Teachers
  - Helgi Tomasson
  - Ricardo Bustamante
  - Felipe Diaz
- Choreographer in Residence: Yuri Possokhov
- Music Director and Principal Conductor: Martin West
- Other Artistic Staff
  - Caroline Giese, Artistic Administrator
  - Alan Takata-Villareal, Logistics Manager
  - Abby Masters, Assistant to the Artistic Staff

=== Music Director and Musicians ===
- Music Director & Principal Conductor: Martin West

==== Strings ====
Violin I
Cordula Merks,Concertmaster	Mia Kim
Wenyi Shih, Associate Concertmaster**	Robin Hansen
Beni Shinohara, Assistant Concertmaster	Brian Lee
Heidi Wilcox	Mariya Borozina
Lev Rankov*	Carla Picchi*
Karen Shinozaki*	Laura Albers*
Violin II
Marianne Wagner, Principal	Patricia Van Winkle
Craig Reiss, Associate Principal	Clifton Foster
Rebecca Jackson, Assistant Principal	Katherine Button*
Jeanelle Meyer**	Julie Kim*
Heeguen Song*	Emma Votapek*
Viola
Yi Zhou, Principal	Caroline Lee
Anna Kruger, Associate Principal	Paul Ehrlich
Joy Fellows, Assistant Principal	Elizabeth Prior*
Katherine Johnk*
Cello
Eric Sung, Principal	Nora Pirquet
Jonah Kim, Associate Principal	Ruth Lane*
Victor Fierro, Assistant Principal	Miriam Perkoff*
Thalia Moore
Contrabass
Steven D'Amico,Principal	Jonathan Lancelle, Assistant Principal
Shinji Eshima, Associate Principal	Mark Drury
Harp
Annabelle Taubl, Principal	Jieyin Wu*
Piano/Celeste
Natal'ya Feygina*

==== Woodwinds ====
Flute
Barbara Chaffe, Principal	Julie McKenzie
Patricia Farrell*
Piccolo
Julie McKenzie
Oboe
Laura Griffiths, Principal	Marilyn Coyne
James Moore III*
English Horn
Marilyn Coyne
Clarinet
Natalie Parker, Principal	Andrew Sandwick
Steve Sanchez*
Bass Clarinet
Andrew Sandwick
Bassoon
Rufus Olivier, Principal	Patrick Johnson-Whitty
Shawn Jones*
Contrabassoon
Patrick Johnson-Whitty

==== Brass ====
Horn
Kevin Rivard, Principal	Keith Green
Brian McCarty, Associate Principal	William Klingelhoffer
Trumpet
Adam Luftman, Principal	John Pearson*
Joseph Brown**
Trombone
Jeffrey Budin, Principal	Hall Goff
Bass Trombone
Scott Thornton, Principal
Tuba
Peter Wahrhaftig, Principal

==== Percussion ====
Timpani
James Gott, Principal
Percussion
David Rosenthal, Principal	Tyler Mack*
Todd Manley*	Mark Veregge*
Peter Thielen*

*Extra Player **Season Substitute
