= List of San Francisco Ballet repertory =

San Francisco Ballet dances seasons each year at the War Memorial Opera House, San Francisco, California and tours. All world premieres were performed by the San Francisco Ballet unless otherwise noted.

== A ==
- After the Rain
- Agon by George Balanchine
  - World Premiere: December 12, 1957 - New York City Ballet, City Center of Music and Drama, New York, New York
  - San Francisco Ballet Premiere (complete ballet): April 10, 1976 - Orpheum Theatre, San Francisco, California
- Alles Walzer (excerpt)
  - World Premiere (complete ballet) 1997 - Vienna State Opera
  - San Francisco Ballet Premiere: January 23, 2008
- Artifact Suite

== B ==
- Beaux
- Bells
  - World Premiere: May 4, 2011 - Joffrey Ballet
  - San Francisco Ballet Premiere: January 22, 2015
- Borderlands
- Borealis©
  - World Premiere: January 22, 2015
- Brahms-Schoenberg Quartet by George Balanchine

== C ==
- Caprice
- Carnival of the Animals
- The Chairman Dances by Benjamin Millepied
  - World Premiere: January 19, 2017 - San Francisco Ballet 84th Anniversary Gala
- Chroma
- Cinderella by Christopher Wheeldon
  - World Premiere: December 13, 2012 — Dutch National Ballet, Het Muziektheater; Amsterdam, Netherlands
  - U.S. Premiere: May 3, 2013
- A Cinderella Story
  - World Premiere: October 20, 2004 - Royal Winnipeg Ballet
  - San Francisco Ballet Premiere - January 22, 2015
- Classical Symphony
- Concerto Grosso
  - World Premiere: January 29, 2003
- Coppélia
- Company B by Paul Taylor
  - World Premiere (complete ballet): June 21, 1991 - Houston Ballet, Eisenhower Theatre, Kennedy Center for the Performing Arts, Washington, DC
  - San Francisco Ballet Premiere (complete ballet): February 3, 1993
- Criss-Cross

== D ==
- Diamonds by George Balanchine
  - from Jewels
    - World Premiere (Jewels): April 13, 1967 — New York City Ballet, New York State Theater; New York, New York
    - San Francisco Ballet Premiere: January 30, 1987
- Divertimento No. 15
- Don Quixote

== E ==
- Emeralds by George Balanchine
  - from Jewels
    - World Premiere (Jewels): April 13, 1967 — New York City Ballet, New York State Theater; New York, New York
    - San Francisco Ballet Premiere: January 30, 1987

== F ==
- Fearful Symmetries by Liam Scarlett
  - World Premiere: January 27, 2016
- The Fifth Season
- Filling Station
- Flames of Paris by Vasili Vainonen
  - World Premiere (complete ballet Plamya Parizha): November 7, 1932 - Kirov Ballet, Kirov Theatre, Leningrad, Russia
  - San Francisco Ballet Premiere: February 3, 1997
- Foragers by Myles Thatcher
  - World Premiere: November 15, 2016 - The Twelfth International Competition for the Erik Bruhn Prize, Four Seasons Centre for the Performing Arts, Toronto, Canada
- The Four Temperaments by George Balanchine
- Fragile Vessels by Jiří Bubeníček
  - World Premiere: January 24, 2017
- Francesca da Rimini
- Frankenstein by Liam Scarlett
  - World Premiere: May 17, 2016 — The Royal Ballet, Royal Opera House, Covent Garden; London, UK
  - San Francisco Ballet Premiere: February 17, 2017
- From Foreign Lands
- Fusion by Yuri Possokhov
  - World Premiere: April 22, 2008

== G ==
- Ghost in the Machine by Myles Thatcher
  - World Premiere: April 5, 2017
- Ghosts
- Giselle
- Glass Pieces
- Guide to Strange Places

== H ==
- “Haffner” Symphony
  - World Premiere: June 25, 1991

== I ==
- Ibsen's House
- In The Countenance of Kings by Justin Peck
  - World Premiere: April 7, 2016
- in the middle, somewhat elevated
- In the Night
- Imaginal Disc

== J ==
- Jewels by George Balanchine
  - Emeralds
  - Rubies
  - Diamonds
    - World Premiere (Jewels): April 13, 1967 — New York City Ballet, New York State Theater; New York, New York
    - San Francisco Ballet Premiere: January 30, 1987

== K ==
- The Kingdom of the Shades from La Bayadère, Act II

== L ==
- La Cathedrale Engloutie by Stanton Welch
  - World Premiere: February 3, 1997, Davies Symphony Hall, San Francisco, California
- Le Corsaire
  - World Premiere: January 25, 1899 - Maryinsky Theatre
  - San Francisco Ballet Premiere: January 14, 1964
- The Little Mermaid

== M ==
- Maelstrom

== N ==
- Nanna's Lied
- Number Nine
- The Nutcracker

== O ==
- On a Theme of Paganini
  - World Premiere: March 7, 2008
- Onegin
  - World Premiere: April 13, 1965 - Stuttgart Ballet
  - San Francisco Ballet Premiere: January 27, 2012
- Optimistic Tragedy by Yuri Possokhov
  - World Premiere: January 26, 2017
- Opus 19/The Dreamer

== P ==
- Pas/Parts 2016 by William Forsythe
  - World Premiere: March 31, 1999 — Paris Opéra Ballet, Palais Garnier; Paris, France
  - San Francisco Ballet Version Premiere: January 24, 2016
- Petrouchka
- Presentce by Trey McIntyre
  - World Premiere: January 19, 2017 - San Francisco Ballet 84th Anniversary Gala
- Prism
- Prodigal Son by George Balanchine
  - World Premiere: May 21, 1929 — Diaghilev’s Ballets Russes, Théàtre Sarah Bernhardt; Paris, France
  - New York City Ballet Premiere: February 23, 1950 — City Center of Music and Drama; New York, New York
  - San Francisco Ballet Premiere: March 27, 1984
- Promenade Sentimentale by Liam Scarlett
  - World Premiere: April 11, 2013 - K-Ballet, Bunkamura Orchard Hall, Tokyo, Japan
  - San Francisco Ballet Premiere (pas de deux): January 19, 2017 - San Francisco Ballet 84th Anniversary Gala

== R ==
- RAkU
- Raymonda - Act III
- The Rite of Spring
- Romeo † Juliet
- Rubies by George Balanchine
  - from Jewels
    - World Premiere (Jewels): April 13, 1967 — New York City Ballet, New York State Theater; New York, New York
    - San Francisco Ballet Premiere: January 30, 1987
- Russian Seasons

== S ==
- Salome by Arthur Pita
  - World Premiere: March 9, 2017
- Scotch Symphony by George Balanchine
- Serenade by George Balanchine
- Seven Sonatas by Alexei Ratmansky
  - World Premiere: October 2, 2009 — American Ballet Theatre, Richard B. Fisher Center for the Performing Arts at Bard College; Annandale-on-Hudson, New York
  - San Francisco Ballet Premiere: April 5, 2016
- Shostakovich Trilogy
- Souvenir D'Un Lieu Cher
  - World Premiere: February 16, 2012 - Dutch National Ballet
  - San Francisco Ballet Premiere: January 22, 2015
- Stravinsky Violin Concerto by George Balanchine
  - World Premiere: June 18, 1972 — New York City Ballet, New York State Theater; New York, New York
  - San Francisco Ballet Premiere: March 28, 1995
- Suite en Blanc
- Swan Lake
  - World Premiere: March 4, 1877 — Bolshoi Theatre; Moscow, Russia. Choreography by Julius Reisinger
  - Premiere of the Petipa-Ivanov Production: February 8, 1895 — Mariinsky Theatre; St. Petersburg, Russia
  - San Francisco Ballet Premiere: September 27, 1940 , Choreography by Willam Christensen
  - Premiere of Current San Francisco Ballet Production: February 21, 2009
- Symphony in C
- Symphony in Three Movements
- Symphonic Dances
- Symphonic Variations

== T ==
- Tears
- Terra Firma by James Kudelka
  - World Premiere: February 16, 1995
- Theme and Variations by George Balanchine
- There Where She Loved
  - World Premiere: Summer 2000 - The Royal Ballet
  - San Francisco Ballet Premiere: August 28, 2003
- Trio by Helgi Tomasson
  - World Premiere: February 25, 2011

== U ==
- Underskin

== V ==
- Valses Poeticos by Helgi Tómasson

World Premiere: January 27, 1990

- The Vertiginous Thrill of Exactitude
  - San Francisco Ballet Premiere: March 5, 1998

== W ==
- Within the Golden Hour© by Christopher Wheeldon
  - World Premiere: April 22, 2008
- Winter Dreams

== 7 ==
- 7 for 8

== See also ==
- List of San Francisco Ballet 2011 repertory
