= List of San Francisco Ballet 2015 repertory =

San Francisco Ballet dances each year at the War Memorial Opera House, San Francisco, and tours; this is the list of ballets with casts for the 2015 season beginning with the gala, Thursday, January 22, 2015, The Nutcracker is danced the year before.

== Gala ==
=== notes for gala ===
The program for the gala

- Défilé, by Helgi Tomasson
- Alles Walzer (excerpt)
- Act II pas de deux from A Cinderella Story
- Pas de deux from On A Theme of Paganini
- Pas de deux from There Where She Loved©
- Concerto Grosso
- Souvenir D'Un Lieu Cher, an Alexei Ratmansky US premiere
  - The American premiere of Souvenir D'Un Lieu Cher is a gift from Alexei Ratmansky in honor of Helgi Tomasson's 30th Anniversary as Artistic Director of San Francisco Ballet
- Pas de deux from Bells
- The Vertiginous Thrill of Exactitude
- Borealis©, a Christopher Wheeldon world premiere
  - Borealis© is a gift from Christopher Wheeldon in honor of Helgi Tomasson's 30th Anniversary as Artistic Director of San Francisco Ballet
- Act III pas de deux from Onegin
- Le Corsaire Pas de Deux

== Program one, Jan 27 - Feb 7 Mixed program ==
- Serenade
- RAkU
- Lambarena

== Program two, Jan 29 - Feb 10 Full-Length ==
- Giselle

== Program three, Feb 24 - Mar 7 Mixed program ==
- The Vertiginous Thrill of Exactitude
- Variations for Two Couples
- Manifesto, a Myles Thatcher world premiere
- The Kingdom of the Shades from La Bayadère, Act II

== Program four, Feb 26 - Mar 8 Mixed program ==
- Dances at a Gathering
- Hummingbird, by Liam Scarlett

== Program five, Mar 20 - Mar 29 Full-Length ==
- Don Quixote

== Program six, Apr 8 - Apr 19 Full length ==
- Shostakovich Trilogy by Alexei Ratmansky

== Program seven, Apr 10 - Apr 21 Mixed Program ==
- Caprice by Helgi Tomasson
- Swimmer, a world premiere by Yuri Possokhov
- The Four Temperaments

== Program eight, May 1 - May 10 Full length ==
- Romeo + Juliet
