= List of San Francisco Ballet 2012 repertory =

San Francisco Ballet dances each year at the War Memorial Opera House, San Francisco, and tours; this is the list of ballets with casts for the 2012 season beginning with the gala, Wednesday, January 19, 2012, The Nutcracker is danced the year before.

== Program one, January 27 – February 3 Full-length ==
- Onegin

== Program two, February 14 – February 25 Mixed bill ==
- Chroma
- Beaux
- Number Nine©

== Program three, February 16 – February 26 Mixed bill ==
- Le Carnaval des Animaux
- Francesca da Rimini
- Trio

== Program four, March 6 – March 11 Full-length ==
- Romeo & Juliet

== Program five, March 21 - April 1 Mixed program ==
- The Fifth Season
- Symphonic Dances, an Edwaard Liang world premiere
- Glass Pieces

== Program six, March 23 - April 3 Mixed program ==
- Raymonda - Act III
- RAkU
- Guide to Strange Places, an Ashley Page World Premiere

== Program seven, April 12 - April 18 Mixed program ==
- Divertimento No. 15
- Scotch Symphony
- The Four Temperaments

== Program eight, April 27 - May 6 Full-length ==
- Don Quixote
