= Jayna Ledford =

Filipino-American transgender ballerina

Jayna Noel Ledford is a Filipino-American transgender ballet dancer. She performed with Eastern Shore Ballet Theater in Maryland and is a former student at the Kirov Academy of Ballet in Washington, D.C. After coming out as a transgender woman, Ledford lost her scholarship at the Kirov Academy and disenrolled from the school, as they did not permit her to continue her studies as a female dancer. She then trained in classical ballet at First State Dance Academy in Delaware.

== Early life ==
Ledford was born in Leyte, Philippines. She was adopted by the Ledford family, of Indiana, when she was seventeen months old. The family later moved to Salisbury, Maryland in 2008 and then to Frederica, Delaware in 2015.

== Ballet ==
Ledford began training in ballet when she was five years old. She attended summer intensives on full scholarship at the Kirov Academy of Ballet in Washington, D.C., The Rock School for Dance Education in Philadelphia, and with Pittsburgh Ballet Theatre in Pittsburgh. In 2008, she began training at the Salisbury Dance Academy in Maryland and performed with the Eastern Shore Ballet Theater in The Nutcracker, Coppélia, and The Seven Dwarfs. During this time she also performed at Disney World.

She was offered a full scholarship, as a male dancer, to attend the Kirov Academy of Ballet in Washington, D.C. as a full-time student. While a student at Kirov, Ledford came out as a transgender woman and began transitioning. Her social and medical transition led to her losing the dance scholarship, so she took a year off from school to train en pointe under Michele Xiques as a female dancer at First State Dance Academy. A month into pointe training, Ledford was cast as Snow Queen in First State's production of The Nutcracker.

== Personal life ==
After finishing high school, she attended Montclair State University majoring in dance and exercise science. She also became involved in Filipino and LGBTQ+ student groups at Montclair.

== Legacy ==
A dance studio at Midwest Movement Collective in Grand Rapids, Michigan is named after Ledford.
