= Melissa Hough =

American ballet dancer

- Born: 1985 or 1986 (age 39–40); Maryland, U.S.
- Education: Kirov Academy of Ballet
- Occupation: ballet dancer
- Children: 1
- Career
- Current group: Norwegian National Ballet
- Former groups: BalletMet; Boston Ballet; Houston Ballet

Melissa Hough (born 1985/1986) is an American ballet dancer who is currently a principal dancer with the Norwegian National Ballet. She was previously a principal dancer with the Boston Ballet and a first soloist with the Houston Ballet.

== Early life ==
Hough was born in Maryland; both of her parents are retired United States Army Field Band musicians. She started dancing at age 3, and switched to a competitive local studio at age 7, where she learned different dance styles. At age 13, she entered the Kirov Academy of Ballet in Washington DC, under Alla Sizova, but continued dancing with the local studio until she was 17.

== Career ==
Hough was an apprentice with the BalletMet in Columbus, Ohio for a year, then joined the Boston Ballet II. She was taken to the main company's corps de ballet at age 19, and was promoted to soloist at age 22. In 2009, at age 24, she was made principal dancer. She was mainly cast in contemporary works, but got more classical roles after she won a bronze medal at the Helsinki International Ballet Competition by dancing a variation from The Sleeping Beauty.

Due to frustration with the lack of opportunities to dance classical roles in Boston Ballet, Hough sent a video of her to Stanton Welch, the artistic director of the Houston Ballet, whom she met at BalletMet, and was offered a soloist contract. Hough said she chose to join Houston Ballet because of its repertoire and facilities. She made her company debut with "Rubies" and "Diamonds" from George Balanchine's Jewels. She was promoted to first soloist in 2012.

In 2013, she moved to Oslo to join the Norwegian National Ballet. The following year, she appeared in the filmed version of Alexander Ekman's A Swan Lake as the Black Swan. She is currently a principal dancer.

As a choreographer, Hough had created works for the Norwegian National Ballet's Sleepless Beauty program. She is set to return to Boston Ballet to choreograph for the choreograpHER program.

== Personal life ==
Hough has a daughter.
