= J'aime Crandall =

American ballet dancer

- Born: April 28, 1982 (age 43); Virginia, U.S.
- Education: Kirov Academy of Ballet
- Occupation: ballet dancer
- Years active: 2001–present
- Career
- Current group: Royal Danish Ballet
- Former groups: Universal Ballet; Dutch National Ballet

J'aime Crandall (born April 28, 1982) is an American ballet dancer. She is a principal dancer at Royal Danish Ballet.

== Early life and education ==
Born in Virginia, she grew up in Arizona, and trained in a ballet school in Phoenix. When she was 13, she was admitted to the Kirov Academy of Ballet in Washington, D.C.

== Career ==
In 2001, she joined Universal Ballet in Seoul, South Korea and was promoted to demi-soloist the following year. Her repertoire there where her repertoire included works by Petipa, Balanchine, Brian Yoo and Oleg Vinogradov. In 2003, she became a member of the Dutch National Ballet in Amsterdam. In 2008, she joined the Royal Danish Ballet in Copenhagen as member of the corps de ballet, becoming a soloist in February 2011 and a principal dancer in December the same year. She has danced leading roles in The Sleeping Beauty, Études, La Sylphide and The Nutcracker.

== Selected repertoire ==
- Juliet in Romeo and Juliet
- The Ballerina in Theme and Variations
- Odette/Odile in Swan Lake
- Manon in Manon
- Sylph in La Sylphide
- Manon in Lady of the Camellias
- Tchaikovsky Pas de deux
- Sugar Plum Fairy and Dewdrop in The Nutcracker
- The Ballerina in Etudes
- Aurora in The Sleeping Beauty
- Ballerina in Other Dances
- 3rd Movement in Symphony in C
- Nikiya in La Bayadere
- Pas de six in Napoli
- Russian Girl in Serenade
- Pas de deux in Agon
- Mercedes in Don Quixote
- Bella Figura
- Apollo
