= List of San Francisco Ballet 2011 repertory =

San Francisco Ballet dances each year at the War Memorial Opera House, San Francisco, and tours; this is the list of ballets with casts for the 2011 season beginning with the gala, Wednesday, January 26, 2011, The Nutcracker is danced the year before.

== Gala ==
=== notes for gala ===
Black Swan pas de deux was not listed in the program, but danced by Sofiane Sylve

== Program one, January 29 – February 13 Full-length ==
- Giselle

== Program two, Mixed bill ==
- Symphonic Variations
- RAkU
- Symphony in C

== Program three, Mixed bill ==
- Classical Symphony
- Nanna’s Lied
- Artifact Suite

== Program four, Mixed bill ==
- TRIO
- Winter Dreams
- Theme and Variations

== Program five, Full-length ==
- Coppélia

== Program six, Mixed program ==
- Ghosts
- 7 for Eight
- Chroma

== Program seven, Mixed program ==
- Petrouchka
- Underskin
- Number Nine

== Program eight, Full-length ==
- The Little Mermaid
