= Shinji Eshima =

Japanese-American musician (born 1956)

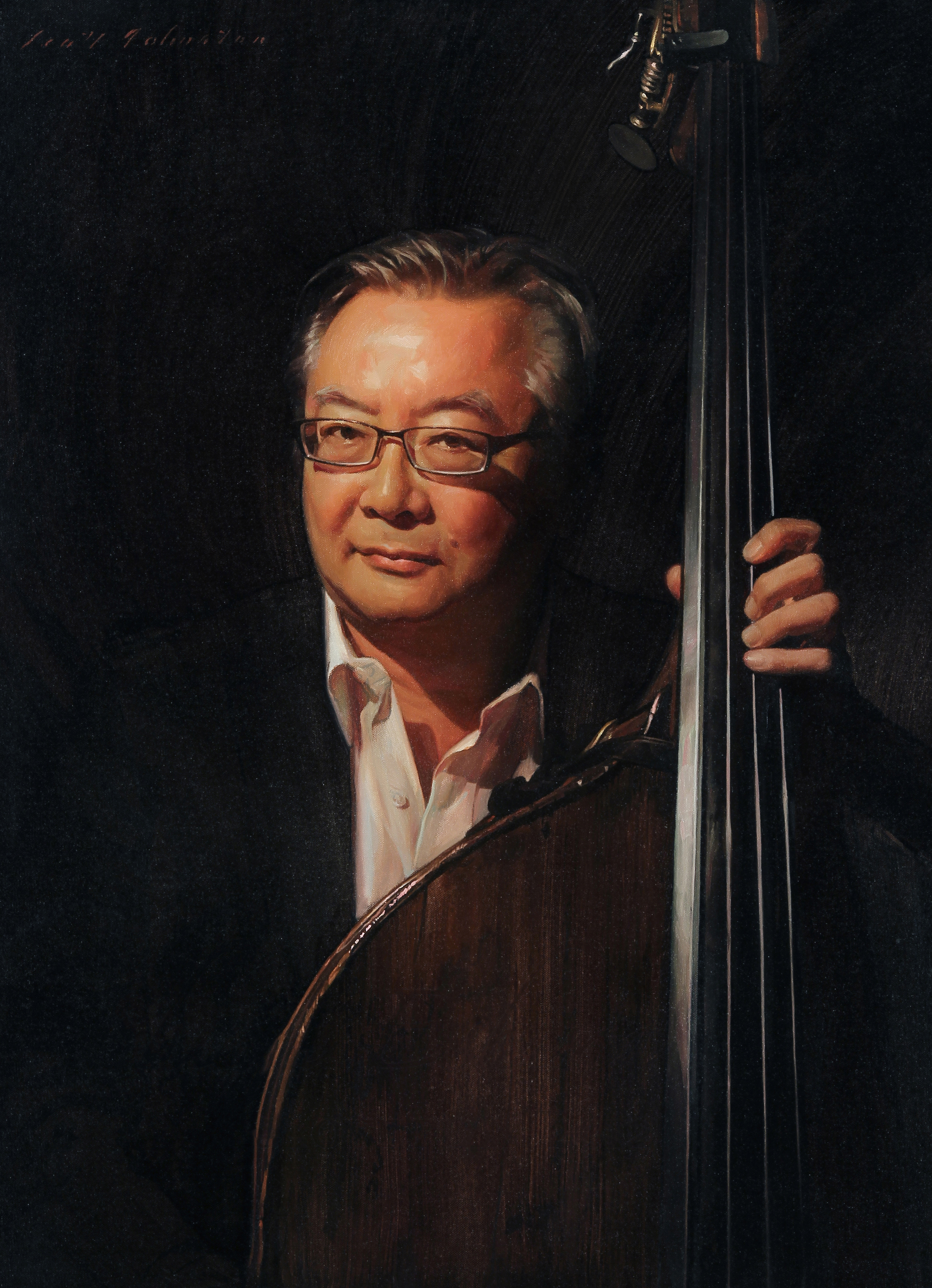
- Shinji Eshima with Plumerel Bass, painted by Scott W. Johnston, 2012

Background information
- Born: Shinji Takane Eshima; August 4, 1956 (age 70); Berkeley, California, U.S.
- Education: Stanford University (BA); Juilliard School (MA)
- Occupations: Musician; composer; music teacher
- Instruments: Double bass; piano
- Years active: 1965–present
- Spouses: Barbara Petniunas (divorced); Rachel Waldron (divorced); Sandy Jennings

Shinji Takane Eshima (born August 4, 1956) is a Japanese-American double bassist, composer, and music teacher.

== Early life and education ==
Eshima was born on August 4, 1956 in Berkeley, California. He took piano lessons since childhood, winning the Junior Bach Festival at nine years old. As a bassist, he was primarily self-taught for the first three years of learning the instrument, but he was inspired by violinist and educator Anne Crowden, his first music teacher for bass. He played in the Berkeley Youth Orchestra and the Oakland Symphony Youth Orchestra (OSYO) from 1972 to 1974; the latter group, led by Maestro Denis de Coteau, performed on tour in Berlin.

Eshima graduated with a Bachelor of Arts in Music from Stanford University in 1978 and the Juilliard School with a Master of Music degree in 1979. His primary teachers were his first bass professor, Charles Siani (Stanford University), and David Walter (The Juilliard School). As a composer, he studied with Heinrich Taube.

== Work as a bassist ==
=== Early professional career ===
Under the baton of Sandor Salgo, Eshima was principal bass of the Marin Symphony and the Carmel Bach Festival. He was also a bassist with San Jose Symphony under Maestro George Cleve. Eshima has also performed with Alma Trio, SF Chamber Soloists, SF Chamber Orchestra, Francesco Trio, and as part of the Schwabacher Recital Series

=== Present ===
Eshima has been a double bassist for San Francisco Opera and San Francisco Ballet since 1980 and 1982, respectively. He holds the position of Associate Principal Bass in the San Francisco Ballet Orchestra.

=== Instrument ===
Shinji Eshima plays on the 1843 Charles Plumerel bass that is seen in the Edgar Degas 1870 c. oil on canvas painting The Orchestra at the Opera which hangs at the Musée d'Orsay in Paris (an oil sketch of the work is owned by the Fine Arts Museums of San Francisco and is often on display at the Legion of Honor Museum in San Francisco). The bass was depicted again in the oil portrait, Shinji Eshima with Plumerel Bass, by artist Scott Wallace Johnston in 2012. An inscription on the bass states that Plumerel's instrument imitated Stradivari, but it is unconfirmed whether or not the bass is a copy of an instrument made by Antonio Stradivari. The bass was originally owned by Achille Henry Victor Gouffé, a soloist of the Paris Opéra who performed with the company for 35 years and appears with the bass in the aforementioned Degas painting (Gouffé was 66 years old at the time). The bass has since been performed with the Metropolitan Opera, New York Philharmonic, NBC Symphony Orchestra, and New York City Ballet. Eshima's Juilliard teacher, David Walter, was the principal bass of the New York City Ballet orchestra and he played the Plumerel for more than 30 years. Six years after Walter's death, it was passed on to Shinji Eshima. The bass was first performed at the War Memorial Opera House in 2008 during the 75th anniversary of San Francisco Ballet.

Eshima favors handmade Passione double bass strings by Pirastro.

== Work as a teacher ==
Since 1991, Eshima has taught classical bass at San Francisco State University. He started teaching at the San Francisco Conservatory of Music in 2000. He was previously a faculty member at Stanford University, San Francisco School of the Arts, and the University of California, Santa Cruz. His students have received positions with the San Francisco Symphony, the Royal Opera, Covent Garden, London's Philharmonia Orchestra, the Montreal Symphony, and Utah Symphony. In June 2011, he organized and presented at the International Society of Bassists at San Francisco State University, which was attended by over 1,100 bassists from around the world. On November 19, 2015, he presented his lecture "Bach, Ballet, Buddhism, Boddhisattvas, and Anne Crowden" as part of the Mancini lecture series at The Crowden School in Berkeley.

== Compositions ==
- "Yabba Dabba Duo," for cello duo, written for Judiyaba (1991)
- "August 6th," for violin and double bass, commissioned for the 50th anniversary of the bombing of Hiroshima (1995)
- “Tathata,” performance piece incorporating haiku of Robert Hass and sculptures of Andrée Singer Thompson at 450 Geary Street Theatre (1995)
- "The Snow Queen," soundtrack for 450 Geary Theater (1996)
- "Shoshin Ge," for two Buddhist monks and electronic soundtrack (1999)
- "Generations," for three mallet instruments, piano, and women's chorus, written for Adesso group (2001)
- "In a Quiet Valley," Gatha (Hymn), written for the Buddhist Churches of America (2001)<ref[>https://seattlebetsuin.com/newsletter/201806-en.pdf Musical Notes] Newsletter p. 5</ref>
- "Oneness," Gatha (Hymn), written for the Buddhist Churches of America (2001)
- "Grat-etude," for solo bass, written for Gary Karr (2002)
- "If It's Tuesday, It Must Be Up-bow," for solo bass, as part of A Family Album book 3, The Walter Family, works written for David Walter by his former students, published by Liben (2002)
- "The Despot's Rage, the Slave's Revenge," for marimba, violoncello, and piano, written for Emil Miland (2003)
- "Toadfish," trio for clarinet, violoncello, and piano, written for TRIAD (2005)
- "Nutcracker Nutz and Boltz," soundtrack for Lunatique Fantastique Theater (2005)
- "Suicide Note," commission for solo trumpet etude, published in a collection of works called 5X5: Five Unaccompanied Trumpet Solos for A New Century, Pasquina Publishing (2008)
- "Chicken Stock," soundtrack for Lunatique Fantastique Theater (2008)
- "E.O. 9066," soundtrack for play produced by Lunatique Fantastique Theater (2009)
- "Krapp's Endgame," for bassoon and string quartet, and optional Buddhist monk, based on the writings of Samuel Beckett and Allen Ginsberg, written for Steven Dibner (2009)
- RAkU, score for full orchestra, commissioned by San Francisco Ballet (2011)
- Il Fazzoletto, ballet theater, conceived by Peter Brandenhoff and Andrew Mezvinsky with text by Jerome Oremland (2011)
- “...needs no explanation,” commission for National Dance Institute (2011)
- “Bondage, Requiem for the Common Man,” for the Bay Brass and Glenn Fischthal solo trumpet, dedicated to Fischthal (2012)
- "All's Farrow," commissioned by San Francisco Zen Center, written for Peace Bell sculpture created by Al Farrow (2012)
- “Circle Triangle Square,” with text by poet Jane Hirshfield, performed by Zen Center Abbot Steve Stucky, members of the SF Zen Center Community, Olga Rakitchenkov (harp), Todd Manley (percussion), and Brandi Brandes (percussion) (2012)
- "Delta 88," for solo piano, written for Sarah Cahill (2013)
- “Es Musk Sein,” for solo cello, commissioned by Earplay, written for Thalia Moore (2015)
- Swimmer, score for full orchestra, commissioned by San Francisco Ballet (2015)
- "Bariolage," for violoncello and double bass, commissioned by Michèle and Larry Corash for Amos Yang (violoncello) and Charles Chandler (bass) (2016)
- "Bourne to Shelley," trio for tenor and Steinway piano, written for Brian Thorsett (tenor), Kevin Rivard (horn), and John Churchwell (piano) to poems by Scott Bourne and Percy Shelley (2016)
- The Little Prince, ballet theater for choreographer Nikita Dmitrievsky, Moscow (2018)
- "Dilly's Ditty" for National Dance Institute (2018)

=== Current projects ===
- Zheng, new opera about Chinese-born, American mezzo-soprano Zheng Cao composed by Eshima with libretto by Tony Asaro. Cori Ellison is the dramaturg, Peter W. Davis is the producer, and Sara Nealy is the development consultant.

=== Recordings ===
- "If It's Tuesday, It Must Be Up-Bow," A Family Album Book 3, a tribute to teacher David Walter, by Liben Music Publishers (1990)
- Shóshin Ge: Buddhist Hymns of True Faith, chanted by Reverend Haruyoshi Kusada and Reverend J. Hozan Hardiman (1998)
- "August 6th," Millennium Symphony, conducted by Robert Ian Winstin, Millennium Project: Made in the Americas, ERMMedia (2008)
- RAkU, San Francisco Ballet Orchestra and chanters from the San Francisco Zen Center, conductor Martin West (2012)
- Fire and Ashes, Making the Ballet RAkU documentary film

== Awards ==
Shinji Eshima received the Stanford Humanities Awards in 1977.

On December 6, 2011, the city of Berkeley, California honored Eshima's contribution to the arts and commemorated the occasion as "Shinji Eshima Day."

In 2015, in honor of the world premiere of Yuri Possokhov's ballet Swimmer, featuring original music by Eshima, Andrea Campos of Jardinière restaurant created the "Swimmer" cocktail. It consisted of The Botanist gin, St. Germain (elderflower liqueur) and pamplemousse (grapefruit).

== Personal life ==
Eshima's ex-wives are Barbara Petniunas (now Hodgkinson) and Rachel Waldron. Eshima is married to Sandra "Sandy" Jennings Eshima, a former ballet dancer with New York City Ballet (1974–1983) and currently a repetiteur for The George Balanchine Trust. They live in Marin County, California.
