= Dragoș Mihalcea =

Romanian ballet dancer (born 1977)

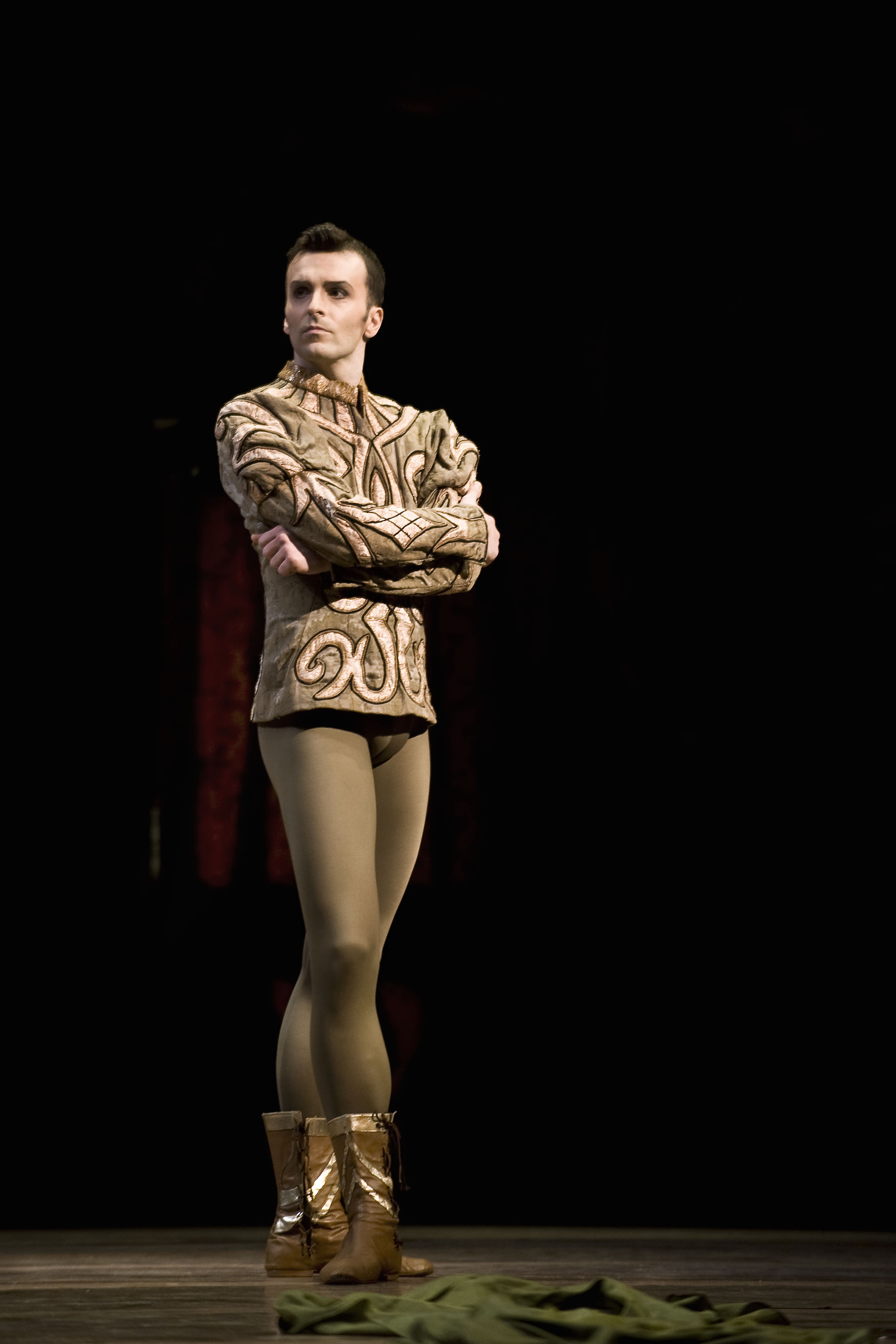
Dragoș Mihalcea in 2010

Dragoș Mihalcea (Romanian pronunciation: [ˈdraɡoʃ miˈhalt͡ʃe̯a]) (born December 17, 1977) is a Romanian dancer, a former principal dancer with the Royal Swedish Ballet.

== Biography ==
Mihalcea was born in Bucharest, Romania, and studied ballet at the urging of his parents. At the age of 14 he received a full scholarship from the Kirov Academy of Ballet in Washington, DC. Between 1997 and 2000 he performed with the Universal Ballet Company in South Korea where he quickly attained the position of principal dancer. He won two bronze medals at the Luxembourg International Ballet Competition and the Rudolph Nureyev International Ballet Competition along with a gold medal at the Premio Roma Danza International Competition. He was invited to the Norwegian National Opera & Ballet as guest dancer in 2000, and then became a principal dancer with the Royal Swedish Ballet in 2001. In 2006, he joined the National Ballet Company in Amsterdam as a principal dancer, before returning to perform in Sweden in 2008.

His Swedish repertoire includes the roles of Des Grieux in "Manon", Onegin in ‘Eugene Onegin’, Prince Desire in ‘Sleeping Beauty’, Albrecht in ‘Giselle’ and Theseus/Oberon in ‘A midsummer night’s dream’. His performance in Eugene Onegin was acclaimed and also announced by himself as a favourite role.

Mihalcea stayed as principal dancer in the Royal Swedish ballet until his official retirement in 2018, at the age of 41.

== See also ==
- Ballet company
- Ballet music
- Glossary of ballet
- History of ballet
- Timeline of ballet
