= Washington Latin Public Charter School =

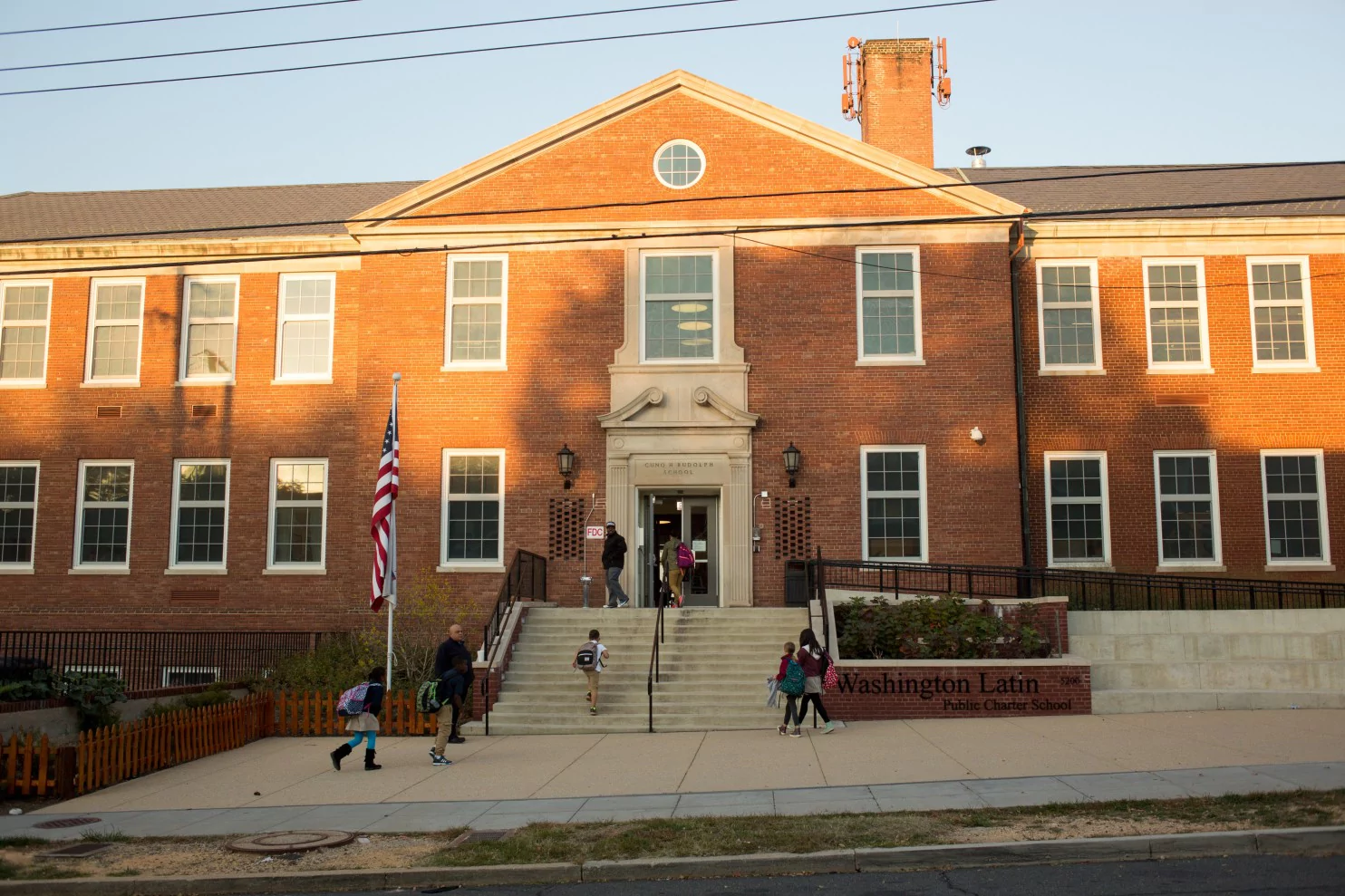
- Washington Latin's 2nd Street Campus

Location
- 5200 2nd Street NW; Washington, D.C. United States; 38.9538931°N 77.0160776°W

Information
- Type: Charter school
- Motto: Discite Servaturi ("Learn, those who are about to serve")
- Established: 2006
- Head of School: Peter Anderson
- Grades: 5 to 12
- Enrollment: 705 (2017-18)
- Colors: navy blue, white, gray, maroon
- Athletics conference: Public Charter School Athletic Association (PCSAA)
- Mascot: Lion
- Nickname: Latin Lions
- Website: www.latinpcs.org

Washington Latin Public Charter is a school in Northwest, Washington, D.C., United States. It features a middle and upper school, serving grades 5–12. It has roughly a 13:1 (13 to 1) student-teacher ratio as of 2026.

Washington Latin was modeled after Boston Latin School, which was the first public school in the United States that taught children under the age of 25. The motto of the school is discite servaturi, meaning "Learn, those who are about to serve".

== History ==
WLPCS opened in 2006 with 179 students in grades five through seven. They have added a grade each year and graduated their first class of high school seniors on 8 June 2012. The school claims to have 972 high school graduates since opening.

Their first location was in Christ Church of Washington (now Embassy Church) at 3855 Massachusetts Avenue (two blocks west of Washington National Cathedral).

In 2008, they added a second campus for the eighth and ninth graders at 4715 16th Street on the corner of Decatur Street NW, which is now the location of the Jewish Primary Day School of the Nation's Capital.

In 2009 they moved the entire middle school (grades 5–8) to the Saints Constantine and Helen Greek Orthodox Church (now Iglesia Ni Cristo - Church of Christ) property at 4115 16th Street NW on the corner of Upshur Street NW, just a half-mile from the Upper School.

In 2010, they added an additional campus for their Upper School at 4501 16th Street NW, on the corner of Allison Street NW in an annex of the Simpson-Hamline United Methodist Church.

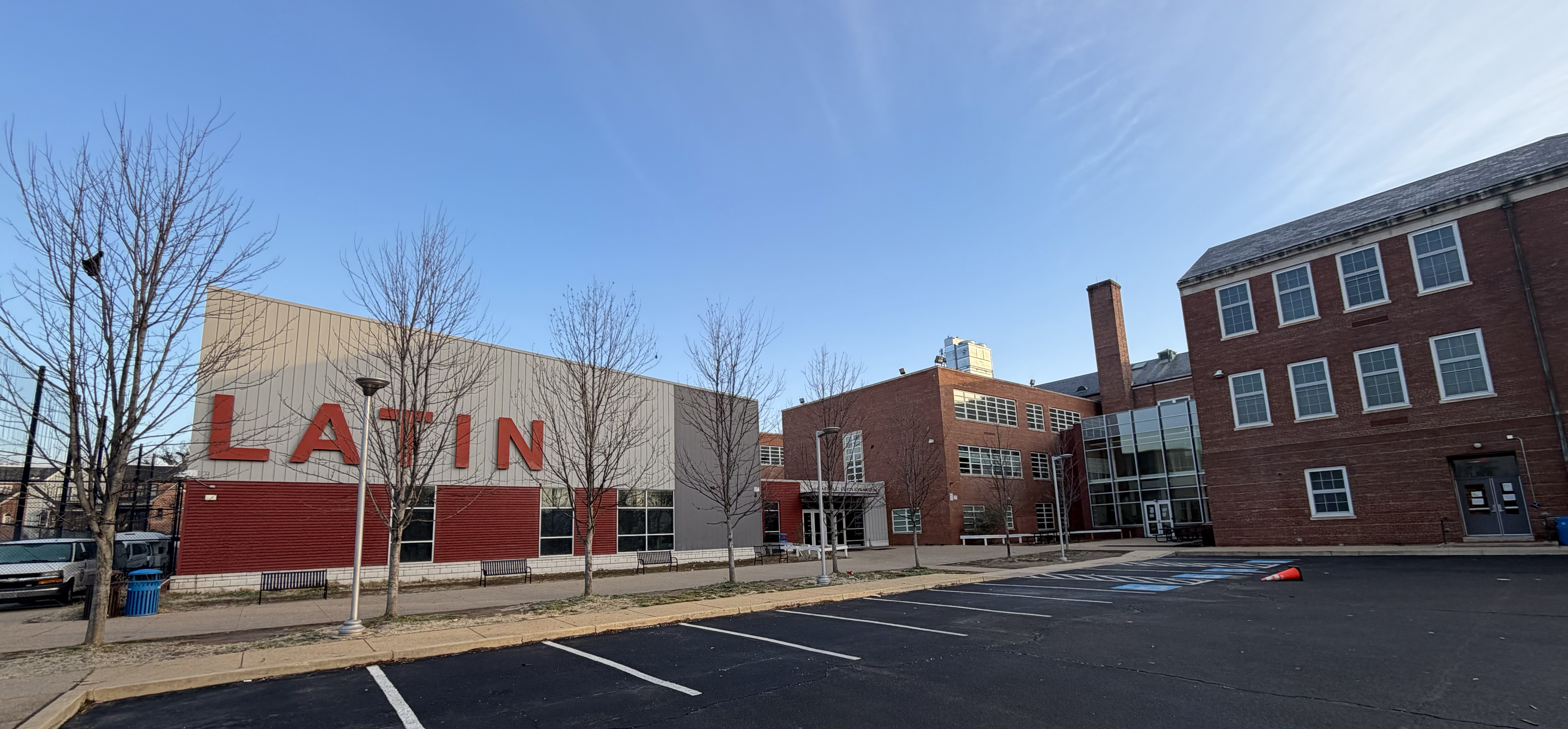
The 2nd Street campus includes the Martha C. Cutts Gymnasium (left).

On July 16, 2012, Washington Latin was awarded the former building of the Rudolph Elementary School at 5200 2nd Street, NW. They modernized and renovated the building and constructed a library. A gymnasium addition was completed on June 9, 2016. The gymnasium is the first cross laminated timber (CLT) structure in the District of Columbia. The design of the modernization and addition projects was done by Perkins Eastman Architects and Demian Wilbur Architects, and constructed by MCN Build.

All 600 students of the Upper School and Middle School moved into the same building at the start of the 2013–14 school year. The 2nd Street Campus is approximately 69,000 square feet on 4.20 acres and includes two large playing fields.

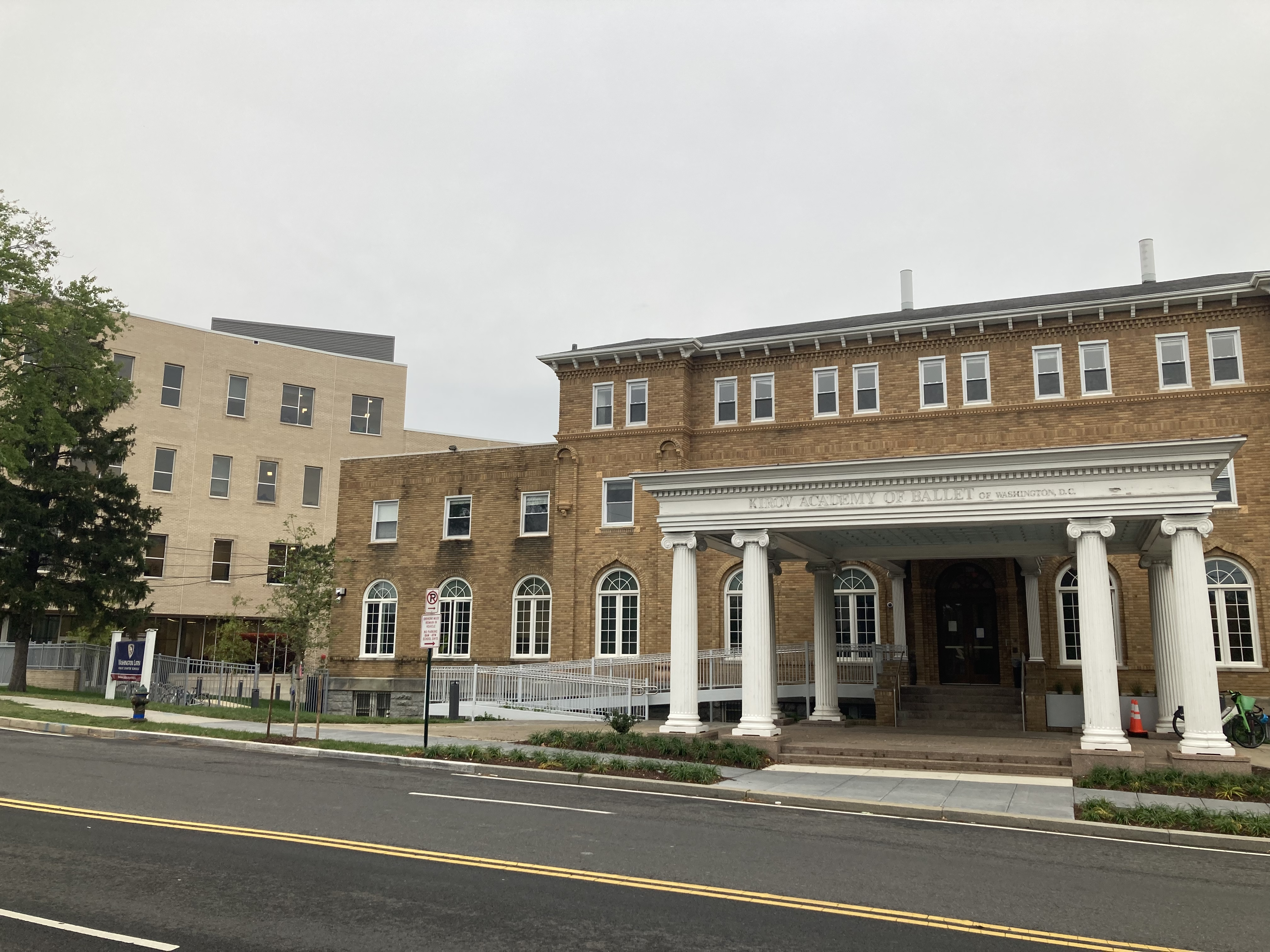
The Anna Julia Cooper Campus of Washington Latin Public Charter School in Northeast Washington, D.C.

Latin was authorized by the Washington Public Charter School board to open second campus location starting in 2020. In 2022, Latin purchased the former Kirov Academy of Ballet in Northeast Washington to serve as the permanent home for this campus, which was named after Anna Julia Cooper.

== Academics ==
Washington Latin offers a classical education. That model emphasizes the Socratic method, recitation of information for memorization, and public speaking.

In addition to Latin, the school offers French, Mandarin Chinese, Arabic and Classical Greek . Students are required to take Latin through level three (traditionally 9th grade in the case that said student has been studying Latin since at least 7th grade) and another modern language out of the options through level two in order to graduate.

48% of Washington Latin's Upper School teachers have a graduate degree.

=== Results ===
As of 2026, Washington Latin's Middle School and Upper School are both rated Tier 1 by the District of Columbia Public Charter School Board.

Washington Latin's 4-year high school graduation rate is 94.2%.

Washington Latin's Upper School is ranked #606 on the National Ranking of Best High Schools, and #4 in the District of Columbia's Best High Schools in 2026 by US News & World Report.

The school states that more than 75% of their students' AP exam results are passing scores.

In 2024-25, 68% of Washington Latin students achieved proficiency in the English Language Arts/Literacy section (1st place ranking) of their PARCC exams and 49% achieved proficiency in the Math section (8th place ranking). The same year, all public and public charter school students in the District of Columbia averaged 37.6% proficient in English Language Arts/Literacy and 26.4% proficient in Math.

== Athletics ==
High School Sports

- Boys' junior varsity soccer
- Boys' varsity soccer
- Girls' soccer
- Boys' volleyball (NEW)
- Girls' volleyball
- Boys' basketball
- Girls' basketball
- Co-ed cross-country
- Co-ed cheerleading
- Co-ed outdoor track and field
- Co-ed indoor track
- Co-ed wrestling
- Co-ed weightlifting
- Co-ed ultimate Frisbee
- Co-ed fencing (NEW)
- Co-ed tennis (off campus) (NEW)
- Co-ed swimming (off campus) (NEW)
- Boys' baseball
- Girls' lacrosse
- Girls' softball

Middle School Sports

- Boys' soccer
- Girls' soccer
- Girls' volleyball
- Boys' basketball
- Girls' basketball
- Co-ed cross-country
- Co-ed sideline cheerleading
- Co-ed competition cheerleading (NEW)
- Co-ed outdoor track and field
- Co-ed ultimate Frisbee
- Boys' baseball
- Girls' lacrosse
- Girls' softball

The Latin Lions compete in the D.C. Public Charter School Athletic Association (PCSAA), the creation of which was spearheaded by Latin's former athletic director, Richard Bettencourt.

In 2017, Washington Latin had its first student sign a National Letter of Intent to play a Division I sport in college.
