= Sasha De Sola =

American ballet dancer

- Born: 1988 or 1989 (age 36–37); Winter Park, Florida
- Occupation: Ballet dancer
- Years active: 2006-present
- Career
- Current group: San Francisco Ballet
- Website: www.sashadesola.com

Sasha De Sola is an American ballet dancer. She is a principal dancer at the San Francisco Ballet.

== Early life ==
De Sola was born in Winter Park, Florida. Both of her parents are musicians. She started dancing at age 3. She began her training at the Central Florida Ballet Academy, then moved on to train at Kirov Academy of Ballet on full scholarship.

== Career ==
In 2011, De Sola joined the San Francisco Ballet as an apprentice at age 17, and became a member of the corps de ballet the following year. She was named soloist in 2012 and principal dancer in 2017. She has danced roles such as Princess Aurora in The Sleeping Beauty, Titiana in A Midsummer Night's Dream, Princess/Henriette in The Little Mermaid, and Kitri in Don Quixote. She has also originated roles such as Stanton Welch's Bespoke, Dwight Rhoden's LET'S BEGIN AT THE END and Trey McIntyre’s Your Flesh Shall Be a Great Poem.

Reviewing her debut as Princess Aurora in The Sleeping Beauty, the San Francisco Chronicle wrote she “finds an emotional line through this passive character and molds steps into statements”. On a mixed bill performance which includes Bespoke and Hummingbird, The Guardian noted De Sola "transformed from the prim perfection of a pageant queen in Bespoke to earnest, lyrical dancer of Hummingbird in the time it took to change costumes."

Outside of San Francisco Ballet, De Sola has appeared in international galas in the United States, Malaysia and Estonia. In 2018, a bilingual children's book based on De Sola's life, On Tiptoes - De Puntitas was published.

== Selected repertoire ==
De Sola's repertoire with the San Francisco Ballet includes:

- Agon (1st pas de trois)
- La Bayadère, Act II (1st and “slow” Solo Shades in “The Kingdom of the Shades”)
- Cinderella (Stepsister Edwina, Spirit of Winter/Fluidity, and Russian Princess)
- Coppélia (Waltz of the Hours soloist, Dawn, Jesterettes, and Swanilda’s Friends)
- Le Corsaire (pas de deux)
- Dances at a Gathering (Blue)
- Don Quixote (Kitri, Bridesmaids, Kitri’s Friends, Seguidilla, Driad Queen, Driads, and Fandango)
- Études (Principal Woman)
- The Firebird (Princess)
- Frankenstein (Justine Moritz)
- Giselle (Myrtha, Solo Wili, and Peasant pas de cinq)
- "Emeralds", "Rubies" and "Diamonds" from Jewels
- The Little Mermaid (Henriette/The Princess)
- The Nutcracker (Party Guests, Queen of the Snow, Snowflakes, Sugar Plum Fairy, Spanish, French, Flowers, and Grand Pas de Deux)
- Onegin (Olga and Polonaise)
- Other Dances
- Raymonda —Act III (3rd classical solo)
- The Rite of Spring
- Romeo & Juliet
- Rush (2nd movement pas de deux)
- Sandpaper Ballet
- Serenade (Russian Girl)
- Symphony #9 and Chamber Symphony in Shostakovich Trilogy
- The Sleeping Beauty (Aurora, Nymphs, and Polonaise)
- Swan Lake (Act I pas de trois, Aristocrats, Swan Maidens, Czardas, Russian, and Peasants)
- Symphony in C (3rd movement demi-soloist)
- Theme and Variations
- West Side Story Suite
- Within the Golden Hour

=== Originated roles ===
- Bespoke
- Bound To
- Ghost in the Machine
- Hummingbird
- LET’S BEGIN AT THE END
- Tears
- Your Flesh Shall Be a Great Poem

== Awards ==
- Silver medal - Professional Division at the World International Ballet Competition, Orlando, Florida, 2017.
- Best Junior Couple Prize - USA International Ballet Competition, Jackson, Mississippi, 2006.
- Junior Division bronze medal - Varna International Ballet Competition, Varna, Bulgaria, 2006.
