= Carlo Di Lanno =

Italian ballet dancer

- Born: 1993 (age 32–33); Naples, Italy
- Education: Accademia Teatro alla Scala, Saint Mary's College of California
- Dancing career
- Former groups: Dresden Semperoper Ballett, San Francisco Ballet, Teatro alla Scala, Berlin State Ballet

Carlo Di Lanno (born 1993) is an Italian ballet dancer. He is a former Principal Dancer with the San Francisco Ballet and Dresden Semperoper Ballett. He trained and graduated at Accademia Teatro alla Scala, and danced with Teatro alla Scala and Berlin State Ballet.

== Life ==
Di Lanno started ballet at the age of 9 at Teatro di San Carlo, and at the age of 15 moved to Milan to continue his studies at Accademia Teatro alla Scala. After his graduation, he joined the corps de ballet of Teatro alla Scala and the Berlin State Ballet. During those years, he danced a variety of soloist and principal roles, including: Sigfried in Swan Lake by Nureyev, Basilio in Don Quixote by Nureyev, the lead role in Diamonds by Balanchine and principal roles in Concerto DSCH and Russian Seasons by Ratmansky and Pink Floyd Ballet by Petit. Subsequently, he joined the San Francisco Ballet as a soloist and was quickly promoted to principal in 2016. During his time with SFB, he worked closely with choreographers in creation of new works, such as: Forsythe's Pas/Parts 2016; Thatcher's Frayed, Painting Greys and Ghost in the Machine; Bubenicek's Fragile Vessels; Millepied's The Chairman Dances; Dawson’s Anima Animus; Welch's Bespoke; Wheeldon's Bound. In 2020, he joined the Dresden Semperoper Ballett as a principal dancer.

He has been named Best Emerging Artist at the Premio Danza&Danza in 2015 and won The Eleventh International Competition for the Erik Bruhn Prize in Toronto, Canada, in March 2015. He was named Italian Classical Dancer of the Year at Positano Premia la Danza Léonide Massine in Positano, Italy, in September 2014.

He holds a Bachelor of Arts in Performing Arts at Saint Mary's College of California. He now attends the Graduate School of Business at Stanford University.

== Repertory ==
- The Nutcracker (Nutcracker Prince, King of Snow)
- Romeo and Juliet (Romeo)
- Swan Lake (Prince Sigfried)
- Sleeping Beauty (Prince Desire)
- Giselle (Prince Albrecht)
- Don Quixote (Basilio, Espada)
- Cinderella (Prince Guillaume)
- Onegin (Onegin)
- Trio
- Prism
- Valses Poeticos
- Haffner Symphony
- The Four Temperaments (Phlegmatic)
- Serenade
- Theme and Variations
- Diamonds
- Stravinsky Violin Concerto
- Agon
- The Vertiginous Thrill of Exactitude
- In the Middle Somewhat Elevated
- Russian Seasons
- Concerto DSCH
- Seven Sonatas
- Symphony #9
- Souvenir d'un Lieu Cher
- Piano Concerto #1
- Dances at the Gathering
- Opus 19/The Dreamer
- Within the Golden Hour
- Variations for two Couples
- Bells pdd
- Rodeo: Four Dance Episodes
- Ibsen's House
- Infinite Ocean
- Excelsior
- Pink Floyd Ballet
- On the Nature of Daylight
- Tchaikovsky
