= Kirov Academy of Ballet =

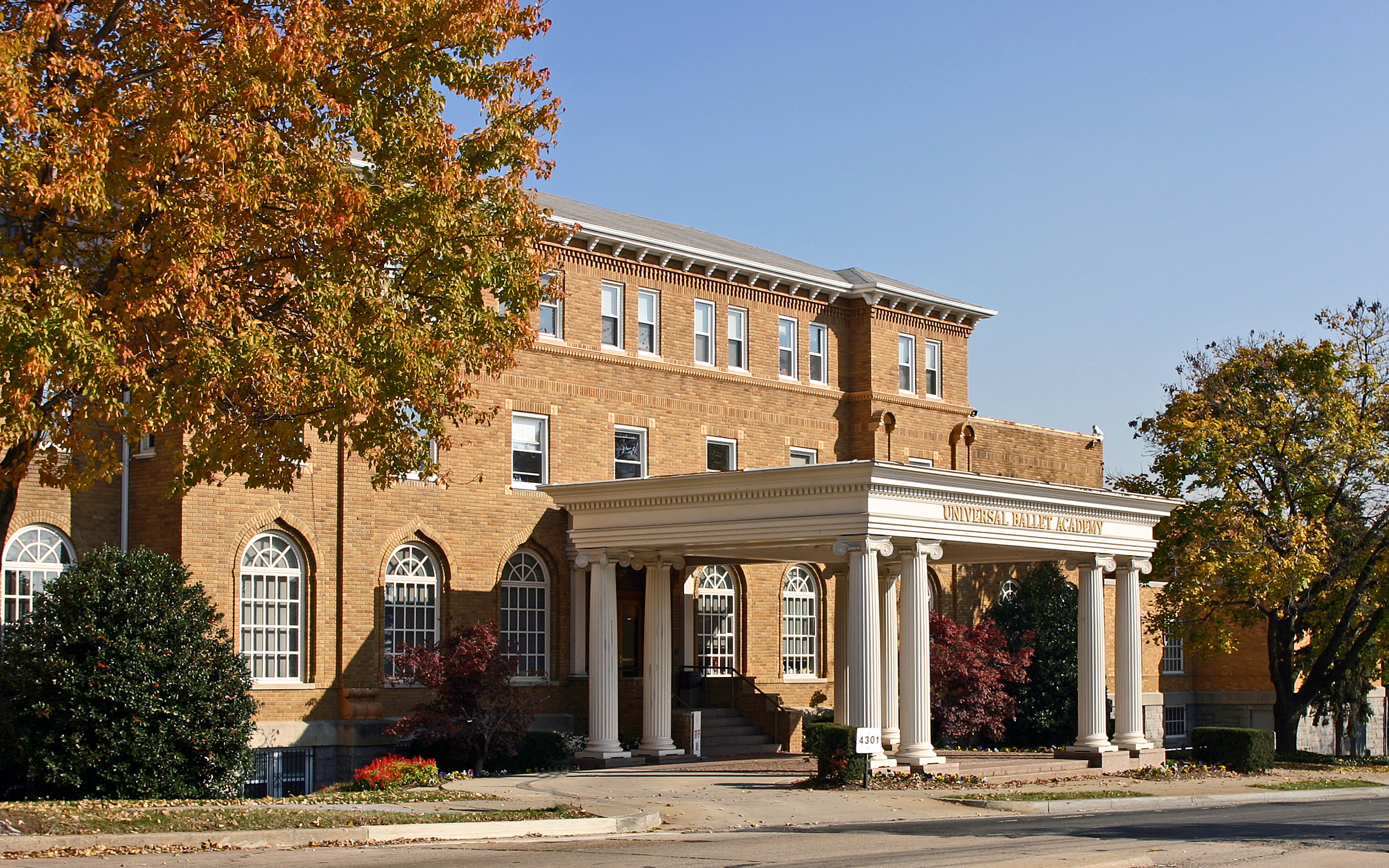

Location
- 4301 Harewood Rd NE, Washington, D.C. United States of America; 38.941°N 77.0032°W

Information
- Type: Ballet school
- Established: 1990
- Closed: 2022
- Grades: 6th through 12th
- Campus size: 1.2 acres

The Kirov Academy of Ballet (formerly the Universal Ballet Academy) was a ballet school in Washington, D.C. founded by Rev. and Mrs. Sun Myung Moon in 1990. It closed in May 2022 after financial difficulties stemming in part from the embezzlement of up to $1.5 million by a school employee.

== Facilities ==
The Kirov was located in a former monastery on a 1.2-acre campus in the Brookland neighborhood of northeast Washington, D.C. The 50,000-square-foot gated facility featured dormitories, studios, and administrative space. In September 2022, the building was purchased by Washington Latin Public Charter School to serve as a home for its second campus.

== Performance series ==
The Kirov’s spring and winter performance series were held in the academy’s 300-seat auditorium. Annually, the six performances served more than 1,800 people, including student performers, family members, children (including from underserved populations), and ballet aficionados of all ages.

== Notable students ==
Kirov Academy of Ballet students went on to become leading dancers at top companies around the world. Graduates and other students include Melanie Hamrick, Sascha Radetsky, Hee Seo, Jayna Ledford, Rasta Thomas, Michele Wiles, Danny Tidwell, Tyler Nelson, Vanessa Zahorian, Sasha De Sola, Brooklyn Mack, Maria Bystrova, Hyo-Jung Kang, Melissa Hough, Connor Walsh, Rory Hohenstein, Brian Maloney, Jonathan Jordan, J’aime Crandall, Elizabeth Mason, Lauren Strongin, Dana Genshaft, Laura O’Malley, Adrienne Canterna, Evan McKie, Dragoș Mihalcea, Yena Kang, Hye-Min Hwang, Jae Yong Ohm, Joy Womack, and Mikayla Geier.

== See also ==
- Kirov Ballet
