= Vanessa Zahorian =

Retired American ballet dancer

- Born: Vanessa Andrea Zahorian; 1978 or 1979 (age 45–46); Allentown, Pennsylvania, U.S.
- Occupation: Ballet dancer
- Spouse: Davit Karapetyan (m. 2011)
- Career
- Former groups: San Francisco Ballet
- Dances: Ballet

Vanessa Andrea Zahorian (born 1978/1979) is an American retired ballet dancer. She was a principal dancer at the San Francisco Ballet. She is currently one of the artistic directors of Pennsylvania Ballet Academy.

== Early life ==
Zahorian was born in Allentown, Pennsylvania and is of Czech heritage. She started training at the Central Pennsylvania Youth Ballet at age 5. When she was 11, she was offered a scholarship to Vaganova Academy of Russian Ballet, but did not actually train there due to her young age and the political climate. At age 13, Zahorian started training at Kirov Academy of Ballet in Washington D.C.. She was then sponsored by the Prince of Monaco to be an apprentice in Kirov Ballet in St. Petersburg.

== Career ==
Zahorian joined the San Francisco Ballet as a member of the corps de ballet in 1997, was named soloist two years later and promoted to principal dancer in 2002. Her first principal role is Odette-Odile in Swan Lake. She has since danced classical roles such as Sugar Plum Fairy in The Nutcracker, the title role in Giselle, Kitri in Don Quixote and Tatiana in Onegin.

In 2017, Zahorian retired from the San Francisco Ballet after dancing Swan Lake, along with her husband, Davit Karapetyan. The couple now direct the Pennsylvania Ballet Academy together. She is also a Balanchine répétiteur.

== Personal life ==
In 2010, Davit Karapetyan, a fellow San Francisco Ballet principal dancer, proposed to Zahorian on stage after a performance of Romeo and Juliet. They married the following year. Zahorian graduated from the St. Mary's College of California.

== Selected repertoire ==
Zahorian's repertoire with the San Francisco Ballet includes:

- Giselle and Myrtha in Giselle
- Grand Pas de Duex Ballerina and Sugar Plum Fairy in The Nutcracker
- Juliet in Romeo & Juliet
- Aurora in The Sleeping Beauty
- Odette/Odile in Swan Lake
- Kitri in Don Quixote
- Swanilda in Coppélia
- Tatiana in Onegin
- Sylvia in Sylvia
- Princess in The Little Mermaid
- Cinderella and Stepsister Edwina in Cinderella
- Allegro Brillante
- Apollo
- Ballo della Regina
- Divertimento No. 15
- "Emeralds" and "Diamonds" from Jewels
- Serenade
- Symphony in C
- Tchaikovsky Pas de Deux
- Theme and Variations
- Western Symphony
- Etudes
- Winter Dreams
- “The Kingdom of the Shades” from La Bayadère, Act II
- Chroma
- Raymonda—Act III
- Le Carnaval des Animaux
- Symphony #9 and Chamber Symphony from Shostakovich Trilogy
- The Concert
- Dances at a Gathering
- Fancy Free
- Rush
- Within the Golden Hour

=== Created roles ===
- Double Evil
- Guide to Strange Places
- Fusion
- Blue Rose
- On a Theme of Paganini
- Trio
