= Swimmer (ballet) =

The Swimmer
- Choreographer: Yuri Possokhov
- Music: Shinji Eshima; Kathleen Brennan; Gavin Bryars; Tom Waits
- Based on: "The Swimmer" by John Cheever
- Premiere: April 10, 2015; War Memorial Opera House
- Original ballet company: San Francisco Ballet
- Design: Alexander V. Nichols; Mark Zappone; David Finn; Kate Duhamel

Swimmer is a ballet choreographed by Yuri Possokhov, to commissioned music by Shinji Eshima, along with music by Kathleen Brennan, Gavin Bryars and Tom Waits. The ballet is inspired by the short story of the same name by John Cheever. The ballet was created for the San Francisco Ballet premiered on April 10, 2015 at the War Memorial Opera House.

== Synopsis ==
After attending a party, an unnamed man decide to go home by swimming in various pools, only to discover his home is gone. At the end of the ballet, a projection shows a man in the ocean.

== Production ==
San Francisco Ballet choreographer in residence Yuri Possokhov's Swimmer is based on the short story of the same name by John Cheever. The ballet is inspired by 1960s United States from Soviet-born Possokhov's point of view, and has various cultural references, such as Vladimir Nabokov's novel Lolita, J. D. Salinger's novel The Catcher in the Rye, Jack London's novel Martin Eden, Edward Hopper's painting Nighthawks, and Mike Nichols's film The Graduate.

The ballet uses a commissioned score by San Francisco Ballet Orchestra member Shinji Eshima, and other music by Kathleen Brennan, Gavin Bryars and Tom Waits. The sets, costumes, lighting and video were designed by Alexander V. Nichols, Mark Zappone, David Finn and Kate Duhamel respectively. Throughout the ballet, the swimming pools are shown on stage through animations. Possokhov himself appeared in the final projection.

== Original cast ==
The original cast consists of:

- Taras Domitro
- Maria Kochetkova
- Lorena Feijoo
- Yuan Yuan Tan
- Tiit Helimets
- Vitor Luiz
