= Optimistic Tragedy =

Optimistic Tragedy may refer to:

- An Optimistic Tragedy, a play
- Optimistic Tragedy (film)
