= RAkU (ballet) =

- Choreographer: Yuri Possokhov
- Music: Shinji Eshima
- Libretto: Gary Wang
- Premiere: 3 February 2011; War Memorial Opera House
- Original ballet company: San Francisco Ballet
- Design: Alexander V. Nichols (sets and projection design), Christopher Dennis (lighting design), and Mark Zappone (costume design)

RAkU is a 37-minute ballet choreographed by Yuri Possokhov that was commissioned by San Francisco Ballet (Possokhov's 13th work for the company) and set to original music composed by Shinji Eshima. The première took place on Thursday, 3 February 2011 at the War Memorial Opera House, San Francisco.

== Overview ==
Program notes for the ballet stated: "Based on the true story of the burning of Kyoto’s Golden Pavilion in 1950, RAkU is set in a much earlier time and in a style similar to Noh theater, which presents the essence of a story rather than a literal depiction... Despite its Japanese story and setting, RAkU contains no traditional Japanese dance or music; Possokhov is more interested in tone, aesthetics, and visual inventiveness than in reenacting history. Combining folk-based steps and Butoh (a post–World War II Japanese dance form utilizing extremely slow movements) with classically based movement, he makes every emotion in this ballet visual and vivid."

The world premiere cast of RAkU consisted of Yuan Yuan Tan as the Princess, Damian Smith as her warrior husband, Pascal Molat as the evil monk and four warriors (Gaetano Amico, Sean Orza, Jeremy Rucker and Quinn Wharton). San Francisco Ballet restaged it in 2012 and 2015. In 2014, Yuan Yuan Tan won the Critics' Circle National Dance Award for Outstanding Female Performance (Classical) for her portrayal of the Princess in RAkU.

On March 13, 2012, an audio recording of RAkU was released. It was performed by the San Francisco Ballet Orchestra and chanters of the San Francisco Zen Center, and led by San Francisco Ballet Music Director and Principal Conductor Martin West at Skywalker Sound on April 22, 2011.

San Francisco Ballet also mounted RAkU on tour at the Segerstrom Center for the Arts in Costa Mesa in September 2011. The orchestra, led by Maestro Martin West, included members of The Pacific Symphony and the Buddhist chants were performed by the Zen Center of Los Angeles. The company also brought RAkU to Sadler's Wells Theatre in London in September 2012 and the Kennedy Center in Washington, D.C., in November 2012.

RAkU joined the repertory of the Joffrey Ballet in September 2014 (the score was performed by Chicago Philharmonic Orchestra, led by Scott Speck) and was revived in 2016. Pacific Northwest Ballet had their company premiere of the work in Seattle in April 2018 (staged by Quinn Wharton).

A one-hour documentary by Shirley Sun about RAkU called Fire and Ashes, Making the Ballet RAkU had its world premiere at the Brava Theater Center on October 20, 2017, as part of the San Francisco Dance Film Festival. The documentary had its New York premiere on July 21, 2018, as part of the Dance on Camera Festival at the Walter Reade Theater at Lincoln Center.

== Reviews ==
- San Francisco Ballet, SF Examiner, February 4, 2011
- San Francisco Ballet, San Francisco Chronicle, February 5, 2011
- San Francisco Ballet, California Literary Review, February 6th, 2011
- San Francisco Ballet, San Francisco Classical Voice, February 8, 2011
- San Francisco Ballet, Bay Area Reporter, February 8, 2011
- San Francisco Ballet at Segerstrom Center, Costa Mesa, OC Register, September 28, 2011
- San Francisco Ballet at Segerstrom Center, Costa Mesa, Los Angeles Times, September 28, 2011
- San Francisco Ballet at Segestrom Center, Costa Mesa, See Dance News, September 30, 2011
- San Francisco Ballet, San Francisco Examiner, March 30, 2012
- San Francisco Ballet at Sadler's Wells Theatre, London, Bachtrack, September 21, 2012
- San Francisco Ballet at Kennedy Center, Washington, D.C., Washington Post, November 14, 2012
- "Joffrey Ballet". Chicago Sun Times. September 19, 2014.
- Joffrey Ballet, Chicago Tribune, September 20, 2014
- Joffrey Ballet, HuffPost, September 22, 2014
- San Francisco Ballet, San Francisco Examiner, January 29, 2015
- San Francisco Ballet, DanceTabs, January 29, 2015
- San Francisco Ballet, danceviewtimes, January 29, 2015
- San Francisco Ballet, Bachtrack, January 30, 2015
- Joffrey Ballet, Stage and Cinema, February 11, 2016
- Pacific Northwest Ballet, The SunBreak, April 15, 2018
- Pacific Northwest Ballet, Seattle Times, April 16, 2018
