= An Easter Story =

- The Waltons episode
- Episode no.: Season 1 Episode 24
- Directed by: Philip Leacock
- Story by: Earl Hamner Jr.
- Teleplay by: John McGreevey
- Narrated by: Earl Hamner Jr.
- Cinematography by: Russell Metty
- Editing by: Marjorie Fowler; Michael McCroskey; Gene Fowler
- Original air date: April 19, 1973

"An Easter Story" was the final episode of the first season of The Waltons. It was also the first two-hour show of the series.

== Plot ==
Olivia begins to experience pain and fatigue, and eventually collapses after church. Numbness in her legs turns to paralysis, and she is diagnosed with polio. However, she refuses to believe that she will never walk again.

Jason is inspired by Grandma as she does her housework. He composes a song he calls "The Ironing Board Blues" which he performs in an amateur talent contest. He wins the contest and a new guitar. The family watches him perform. Back at home, they reenact the contest for Olivia and Erin.

When John-Boy checks in to apply at the University of Virginia, he finds out there is a doctor who specializes in the treatment of polio. John-Boy seeks the doctor out and he tells John-Boy of a new experimental treatment. John-Boy and Grandma encourage Olivia to try the exercises against the advice of the doctor, who suggests that the experimental treatment could leave her worse off. At first, she has hope of recovery by Easter, but then she becomes discouraged and resigns herself to life in a wheelchair. However, shortly before Easter, she dreams that Elizabeth calls out for help, and she gets up out of bed without effort.

Olivia attends the Easter sunrise service on the mountain with her family, celebrating the apparent miracle.

== Cast ==
- Richard Thomas as John-Boy Walton
- Ralph Waite as John Walton, Sr.
- Michael Learned as Olivia Walton
- Ellen Corby as Esther Walton
- Will Geer as Zebulon "Zeb" Walton
- Judy Norton as Mary Ellen Walton
- Jon Walmsley as Jason Walton
- Mary Beth McDonough as Erin Walton
- Eric Scott as Ben Walton
- David W. Harper as Jim-Bob Walton
- Kami Cotler as Elizabeth Walton
- Mary Jackson as Emily Baldwin
- Helen Kleeb as Mamie Baldwin
- John Ritter as the Reverend Fordwick
- Joe Conley as Ike Godsey
- John Crawford as Sheriff Bridges
- Don Collier as Dr. Miller
- Victor Izay as Dr. Vance
- David Doremus as George William "GW" Haines
- Joseph Bernard as Snyder
- Ann Carol Pearson as Admissions Clerk
- Joe Frank Carollo as Tom
- Earl Hamner Jr. as The Narrator

== Production ==
=== Writing ===
The episode was produced by Robert L. Jacks. The teleplay was written by John McGreevey, based on a story by Earl Hamner, Jr.

=== Music ===
The song Ironing Board Blues used in the episode was written and performed by Jon Walmsley.

== Reception ==
In 2009, TV Guide ranked this episode #77 on its list of the 100 Greatest Episodes of All Time.

=== Awards ===
Award	Year (Note: Indicates the year of ceremony. Each year is linked to the article about the awards held that year, wherever possible.)	Category	Nominee	Result	Ref(s)
Emmy Award	1973	Outstanding Drama Series		Won	
Emmy Award	1973	Outstanding Lead Actor in a Drama Series	Richard Thomas	Won	
Emmy Award	1973	Outstanding Lead Actress in a Drama Series	Michael Learned	Won	
Emmy Award	1973	Outstanding Supporting Actress in a Drama Series	Ellen Corby	Won	
Emmy Award	1973	Outstanding Supporting Actor in a Drama Series	Will Geer	Nominated	
