= Kami Cotler =

American actress

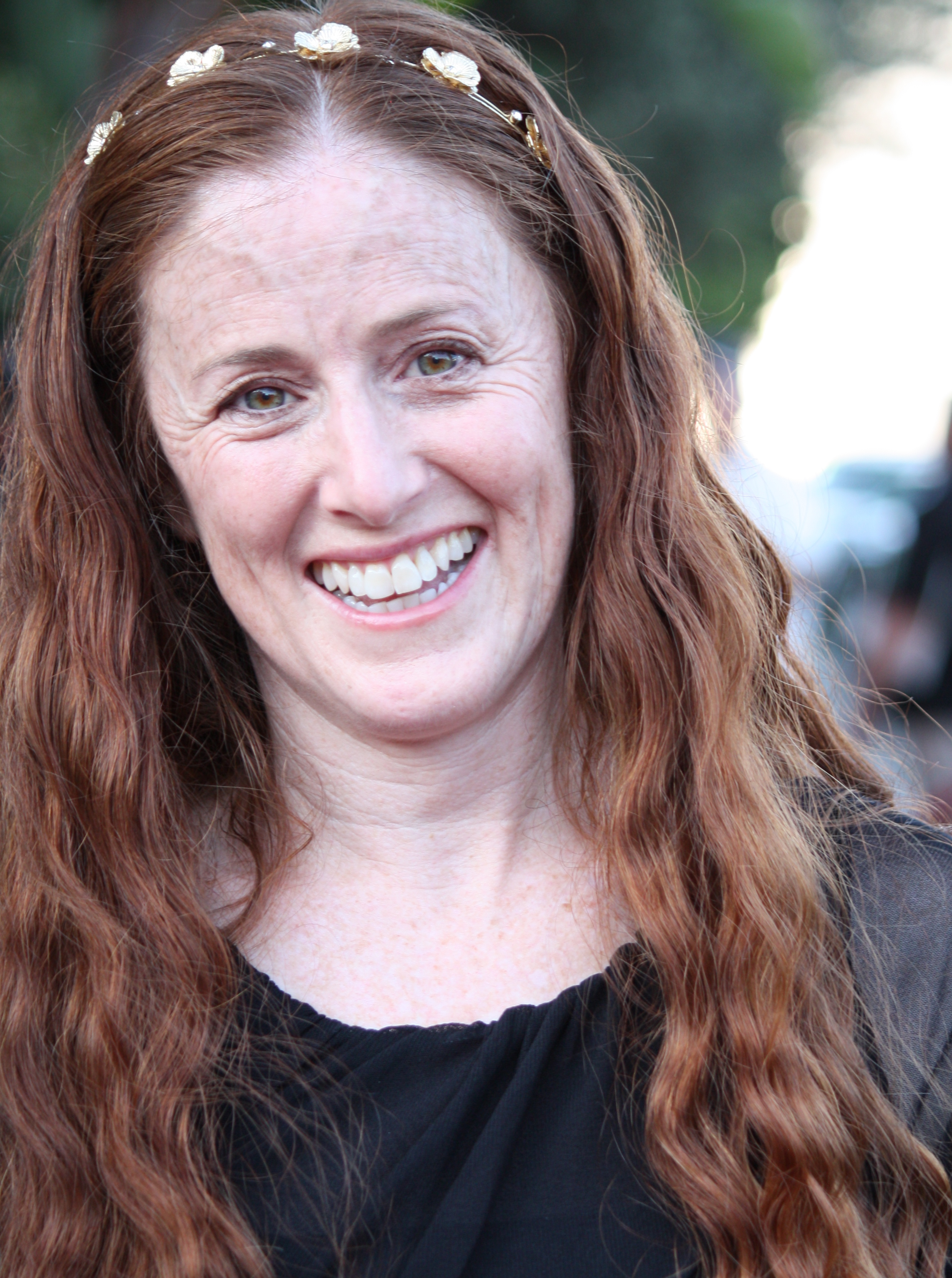
- Cotler at The Waltons 40th Anniversary in 2012
- Born: June 17, 1965 (age 61); Long Beach, California, U.S.
- Occupation: Actress
- Years active: 1971–2018
- Spouse: Kim Howard. (m. 1994)
- Children: 2

Kami Ann Cotler (born June 17, 1965) is an American actress. She is best known for her role as young Elizabeth Walton, which she played in the series The Waltons, and the television film The Homecoming: A Christmas Story (1971) which inspired it, as well as a number of later Waltons reunion productions.

== Biography ==
Colter was born in Long Beach, California on June 17, 1965. Her father, Ken Colter, owned clothing stores in Orange County, and her mother, Barbara Colter, was an IBM executive. She has a younger brother named Jeff.

In 1970 her mother took her two children to a studio for family photos. The photographer was impressed with Colter's personality and red hair, and suggested that her mother send a photo to a talent agent the photographer knew. The next year the agent got Colter the role of Elizabeth on The Homecoming.

Cotler reduced her acting roles while she attended the University of California, Berkeley, earning a degree in Social Sciences.

During the 1990s, Cotler spent five years teaching in Nelson County, Virginia, the county where The Waltons creator Earl Hamner Jr. was born and raised. Cotler returned to California in 2001 and took a position teaching 9th grade at Environmental Charter High School. In 2004, Cotler accepted the job as co-director of the Ocean Charter School, a position held until 2007 when she started her own educational consulting business. She served as the founding Principal of Environmental Charter Middle School, an educational facility in southern Los Angeles County, California.

== Filmography ==
| Year | Title | Role | Notes |
|---|---|---|---|
| 1971 | The Homecoming: A Christmas Story | Elizabeth Walton | TV film which inspired The Waltons |
| 1972 | Me and the Chimp | Kitty Reynolds | 13 episodes |
| 1972 | The Heist | Wendy Craddock | TV movie |
| 1972–1981 | The Waltons | Elizabeth Walton | 212 episodes |
| 1980 | The Waltons: A Decade of the Waltons | Elizabeth Walton / Herself | TV movie |
| 1982 | A Wedding on Walton's Mountain | Elizabeth Walton | TV movie |
| 1982 | Mother's Day on Walton's Mountain | Elizabeth Walton | TV movie |
| 1982 | A Day for Thanks on Walton's Mountain | Elizabeth Walton | TV movie |
| 1993 | A Walton Thanksgiving Reunion | Elizabeth Walton | TV movie |
| 1995 | A Walton Wedding | Elizabeth Walton | TV movie |
| 1997 | A Walton Easter | Elizabeth Walton | TV movie |
| 2018 | Christmas on Honeysuckle Lane | Townsperson | TV movie (uncredited) |
