= David W. Harper =

American actor

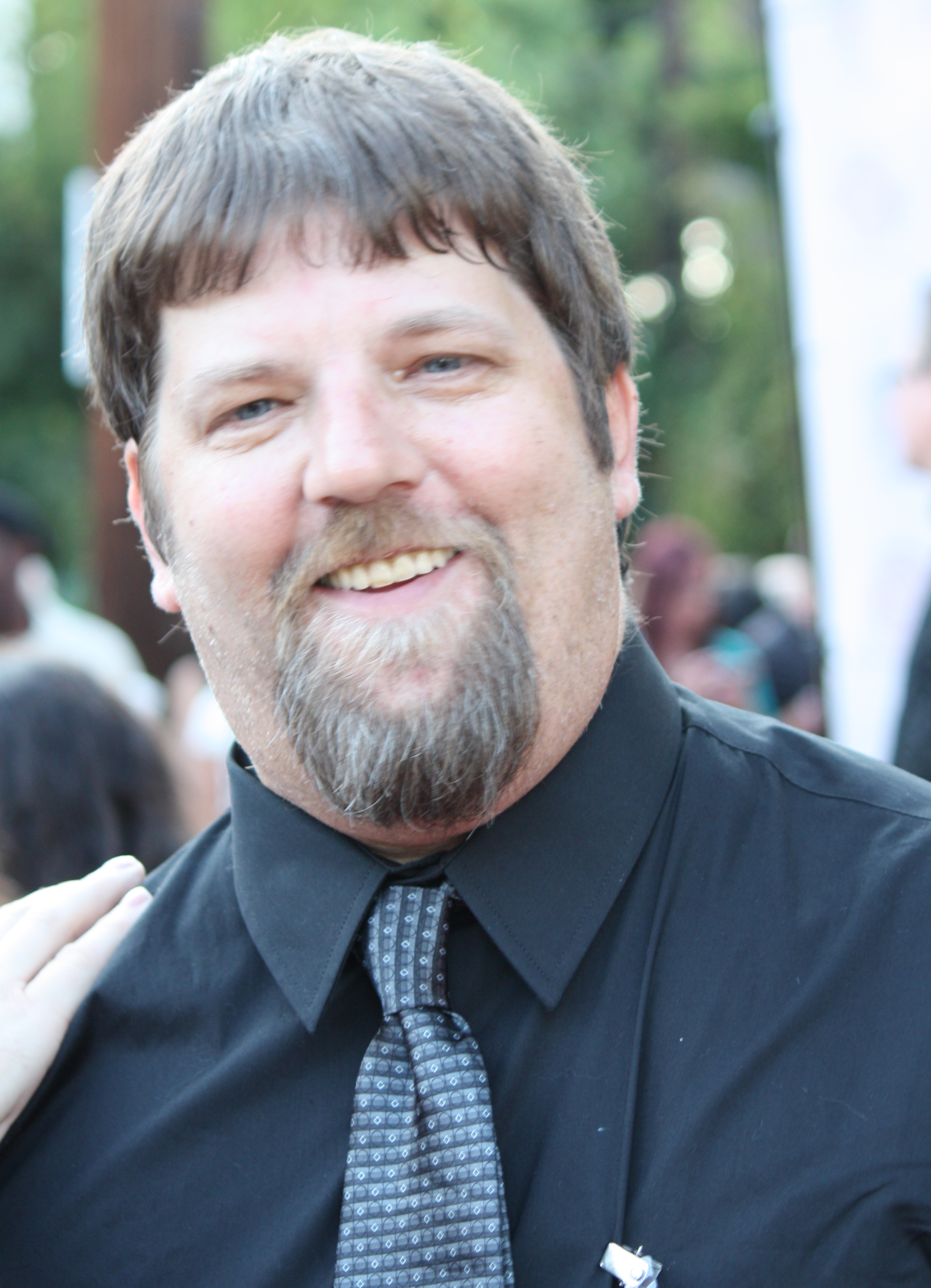
- Harper at The Waltons 40th Anniversary in 2012.
- Born: October 4, 1961 (age 64); Abilene, Texas, U.S.
- Occupation: Actor
- Years active: 1971–2011

David W. Harper (born October 4, 1961) is an American actor. He is best known for his role as Jim-Bob Walton on the television show The Waltons.

== Early life ==
Harper was born on October 4, 1961 in Abilene, Texas. He is the son of actor Paul Harper and Georglynn "Bunny" Scoggins Harper. He has an older sister Michelle.

== Acting career ==
Harper's early roles included a TV pilot with Ernest Borgnine, and an episode of The Man and the City.

He appeared as Jim Bob, the second-youngest of seven siblings, in the made-for-television film The Homecoming: A Christmas Story (1971). When the film was turned into The Waltons television series in 1972, Harper reprised his role and remained with the series throughout its nine-season run.

When The Waltons ended in 1981, Harper appeared in the television miniseries The Blue and the Gray as a Union soldier, and was seen in the theatrical films Fletch and 3:15. Harper returned to his role as Jim-Bob in the Waltons made-for-television movies.

== Later life ==
Harper is not currently active in show business, choosing to live a quiet, private life. He does, however, occasionally appear at Waltons-related functions, such as cast reunions and collectibles and memorabilia fairs. In 1992 Harper attended the opening of the Walton's Mountain Museum in Schuyler, Virginia. At that time he was working as a scenic painter in Los Angeles .

After working at a variety of jobs, including at the messenger service run by his Walton "brother" Eric Scott, he returned to school to study business.

== Filmography ==
=== Film ===
Year	Title	Role	Notes
1977	Walking Tall: Final Chapter	Judd, driver of the sheriff's stolen car	Uncredited
1985	Fletch	Teenager	
1986	3:15 The Moment of Truth	Pay-off guy	

=== Television ===
Year	Title	Role	Notes
1971	The Homecoming: A Christmas Story	Jim-Bob Walton	TV movie
1972–1981	The Waltons	Jim-Bob Walton	TV series, 212 episodes
1980	The Waltons: A Decade of the Waltons	Jim-Bob Walton / Himself	TV special
1982	The Blue and the Gray	James Hale	TV miniseries, three episodes
1982	A Wedding on Walton's Mountain	Jim Bob Walton	TV movie
1982	Mother's Day on Walton's Mountain	Jim Bob Walton	TV movie
1982	A Day for Thanks on Walton's Mountain	Jim Bob Walton	TV movie
1993	A Walton Thanksgiving Reunion	Jim Bob Walton	TV movie
1995	A Walton Wedding	Jim Bob Walton	TV movie
1997	A Walton Easter	Jim Bob Walton	TV movie
