= Jon Walmsley =

British-American musician (born 1956)

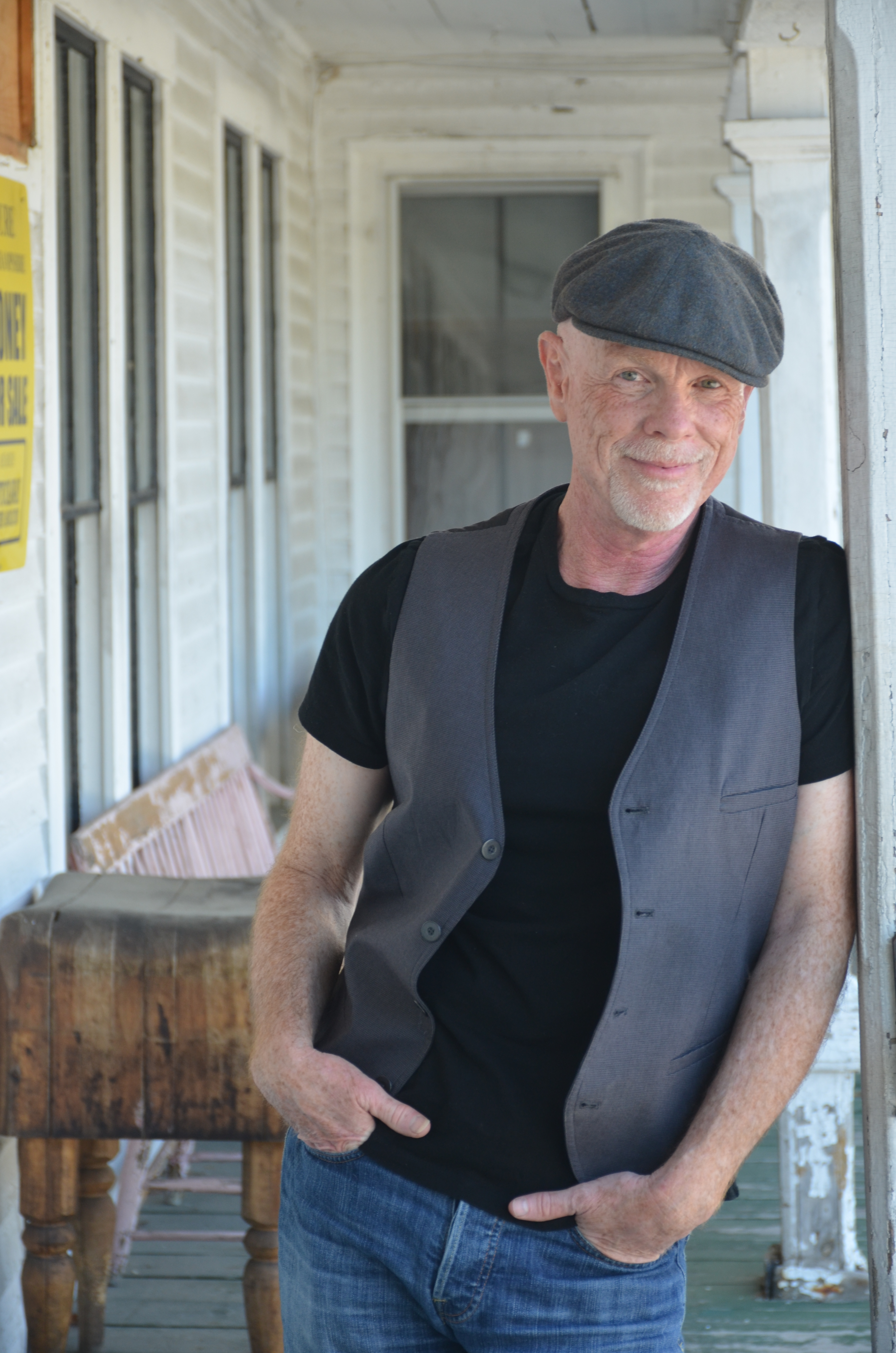
- Jon Walmsley during "Goin' To Clarksdale" photo shoot in 2017
- Born: February 6, 1956 (age 70); Blackburn, Lancashire, England
- Occupations: Actor and musician
- Years active: 1960–present

Jon Walmsley (Born February 6, 1956) is a British-American musician and actor, widely known for playing Jason Walton on the television series The Waltons.

== Early life ==
Walmsley was born in Blackburn, Lancashire, England on February 6, 1956. He was the only child of a grocer and his wife. His family moved to California when he was two years old, because his parents thought California would provide a healthier climate for the family. His father became a salesman.

While in school Walmsley learned to play the piano, guitar, banjo, harmonica, flute, and cello.

== Acting career ==
Walmsley is known for his accomplishments as an actor, most notably a nine-season run as Jason Walton on The Waltons. He also returned for all of the Waltons reunion projects during the 1980s and 1990s.

He provided the voice of Christopher Robin for Disney's Academy Award winning Winnie the Pooh cartoons.

== Musical career ==
Walmsley was a member of Richard Marx's touring band in the late 1980s, and appeared in at least two of Marx's music videos: "Should've Known Better" and "Too Late to Say Goodbye."

Other musicians Walmsley has worked with include the Doobie Brothers, Michael McDonald, Gregg Allman, Merle Haggard (on The Waltons), Denny Lane, Spencer Davis, Peter and Gordon, Jacki Lomax, Roger Daltrey, The Beach Boys, and Dean Torrence of Jan and Dean.

== Personal life ==
In 1979, Walmsley married Lisa Harrison, who played his girlfriend Toni Hazelton on The Waltons. They have a daughter, Brighton. Walmsley and Harrison divorced in 2008.

Walmsley now resides in Cornwall, England with his second wife Marion, whom he married in 2008.

== Filmography ==
=== 1960s ===
- Combat! (ABC military drama, 1966)
- Daniel Boone (NBC western series, 1968)
- The One and Only, Genuine, Original Family Band (musical film with Walter Brennan and Buddy Ebsen, 1968)
- Winnie the Pooh and the Blustery Day (1968) (voice)
- My Three Sons (1968)
- Adam-12 (NBC crime drama, 1969)
- The Bill Cosby Show (1969)

=== 1970s ===
- My Three Sons (1971)
- The Homecoming: A Christmas Story (1971)
- The ABC Saturday Superstar Movie (voice) 1972)
- The Waltons (1972–1981)
- The New Scooby-Doo Movies (1973–1974)
- The Many Adventures of Winnie the Pooh (1977) (voice)
- Dinky Hocker (1979)
- Family Feud (1979)
- $weepstake$ (1979)

=== 1980s ===
- A Wedding on Walton's Mountain (1982)
- Mother's Day on Walton's Mountain (1982)
- A Day for Thanks on Walton's Mountain (1982)
- Waiting to Act (1985)

=== 1990s ===
- A Walton Thanksgiving Reunion (1993)
- A Walton Wedding (1995)
- A Walton Easter (1997)

=== 2000s ===
- O Christmas Tree (TV Special) (2002)
- TV total German Talkshow (2004)
- 7th Heaven (2005)
- 8 Simple Rules (2005)
- It's Always Sunny In Philadelphia (2006)
- Elf Sparkle Meets Christmas The Horse (animation) (voice) (2009)

=== 2010s ===
- Elf Sparkle And The Special Red Dress (animation) (voice) (2010)
- Waltons (TV special) (2010)
- The Today Show (2011)
- Good Morning America (2013)

== Musical works ==
- The Waltons – TV Series (composer, musician) 1971–1981
- 7th Heaven – TV Series (musician) 1996–2007
- Waltons' Christmas CD (composer, musician, producer) 1999
- For the Love of May – Short Movie (composer, musician, producer) 2000
- 8 Simple Rules – TV Series (musician) 2002–2005
- The Sunflowers – CD (musician, producer) 2005
- Primal Twang – The legacy of the guitar DVD (musician) 2008
- Love-in Show – A Musical Celebration DVD (musician) 2009
- Secret Life of the American Teenager – TV Series (musician) 2008–2013
- Elf Sparkle and the Special Red Dress – Animation (composer) 2010
- The U.K. Beat – CD (composer, musician, producer) 2010
- The Sunflowers – CD (Musician, producer) 2011
- Christmas In America – single (composer, Musician, producer) 2014
- Goin' To Clarksdale – CD (composer, musician, producer) 2017
- A Joyful Noise – CD (composer, musician, producer) 2023
