= The Waltons =

American drama television series

- Season 1 title card
- Genre: Historical drama
- Created by: Earl Hamner Jr.
- Based on: The Homecoming by Earl Hamner Jr.
- Starring: Richard Thomas; Ralph Waite; Michael Learned; Ellen Corby; Will Geer; Judy Norton; Jon Walmsley; Mary Elizabeth McDonough; Eric Scott; David W. Harper; Kami Cotler; Joe Conley, Ronnie Claire Edwards, Leslie Winston, Peggy Rea.
- Narrated by: Earl Hamner Jr.
- Composers: Jerry Goldsmith (theme music); Arthur Morton; Alexander Courage
- Country of origin: United States
- Original language: English
- No. of seasons: 9
- No. of episodes: 221 (list of episodes)

Production
- Executive producers: Lee Rich; Earl Hamner Jr.; Rod Peterson
- Producers: Robert L. Jacks; Andy White; Rod Peterson; Claylene Jones
- Running time: 45–48 minutes
- Production company: Lorimar Productions

Original release
- Network: CBS
- Release: September 14, 1972 – June 4, 1981

Related
- The Homecoming: A Christmas Story (1971); A Wedding on Walton's Mountain (1982)

The Waltons is an American historical drama television series about a family in rural mountainous Western Virginia of the Appalachian/Blue Ridge Mountains chain, during the economic hardships and mass unemployment of the Great Depression in the 1930s and the subsequent United States home front during World War II in the 1940s. It was created by screenwriter and author Earl Hamner Jr., based on his 1961 book (and 1963 movie) Spencer's Mountain. The Waltons aired from September 14, 1972, to June 4, 1981, and took place in the fictional Walton's Mountain, Virginia.

The TV film special The Homecoming: A Christmas Story was broadcast on December 19, 1971. Based on its high ratings and critical success, the CBS network ordered the first season of episodes (to be based on the same characters, with some changes in the casting) which became known as the television series The Waltons. Beginning in September 1972, the series was broadcast on the CBS network for nine seasons. After the series was canceled in 1981, three television film reunion sequels aired in 1982 on NBC, with three more in the 1990s back on CBS. The Waltons was produced by Lorimar Productions and distributed by Warner Bros. Domestic Television Distribution in later syndication after 1981.

Each episode's end sequence featured the voices of the family's members saying goodnight to one another before going to sleep for the night. According to the BBC which broadcast the series in the United Kingdom, "Goodnight, John-Boy" was one of the most common catchphrases of the 1970s.

== Premise ==
Season	Episodes	Originally released		Rank	Rating
Season	Episodes	First released	Last released	Rank	Rating
Television Film		December 19, 1971		—N/a	—N/a
1	25	September 14, 1972	April 19, 1973	19	20.6 (Note: Tied with The Partridge Family and Medical Center)
2	25	September 13, 1973	March 14, 1974	2	28.1
3	25	September 12, 1974	March 6, 1975	8	25.5
4	25	September 11, 1975	March 4, 1976	14	22.9 (Note: Tied with M*A*S*H)
5	25	September 23, 1976	March 17, 1977	15	22.3 (Note: Tied with Little House on the Prairie)
6	26	September 15, 1977	March 30, 1978	20	20.8 (Note: Tied with The ABC Sunday Night Movie)
7	24	September 21, 1978	March 22, 1979	37	19.0
8	24	September 20, 1979	March 13, 1980	—N/a	—N/a
9	22	November 27, 1980	June 4, 1981	30	18.6
TV Movies	6	February 22, 1982	April 27, 1997	—N/a	—N/a

=== Setting ===
The main story is set in Walton's Mountain, a fictional mountain community in the fictitious Jefferson County, Virginia. The stories are based upon events in Hamner's childhood home in Schuyler in Nelson County, Virginia.

The time period is from 1933 to 1946, during the Great Depression in the United States and World War II. A portrait of president Franklin D. Roosevelt hangs in the Walton homestead and neighboring Ike Godsey's General Mercantile store. The year 1933 is suggested by a reference to the opening of the Century of Progress exposition (World's Fair) held in Chicago, a brief shot of an antique automobile registration license plate, and when it is divulged in episode 5 that the date is in the spring of 1933. The last episode of season one, "An Easter Story," is set in February–April 1934. The year 1934 is covered over two seasons, while some successive years are covered over the course of a few months.

The series finale, "The Revel," revolves around a party and the invitation date is given as June 4, 1946. A span of 13 years is therefore covered in nine seasons. There are some chronological inconsistencies, most of which do not hinder the storyline. The episode depicting the attack on Pearl Harbor on December 7, 1941, was first broadcast on December 7, 1978. Although December 7, 1978, fell on a Thursday, the show's regular broadcast day, and December 7, 1941, was a Sunday, the show commemorating the attack was coordinated with the 37th anniversary of the actual event.

The first three reunion movies (A Wedding on Walton's Mountain, Mother's Day on Walton's Mountain, and A Day for Thanks on Walton's Mountain), all produced in 1982, and aired several weeks apart are set in the later post-war year of 1947. Of the later reunions TV films, A Walton Thanksgiving Reunion, filmed in 1993, is set in 1963, and revolves around the assassination of John F. Kennedy. A Walton Wedding, made two years later in 1995, is set in 1964, and A Walton Easter, filmed another two years following in 1997, is set in fictional 1969, with the social and political themes of the turbulent late 1960s intertwined in the updated story of the later generations of the Walton family.

The series began relating stories that occurred 39 years in the past and ended with its last reunion show set 28 years in the past.

A continuity error exists in the final reunion movie about how many years John and wife / mother Olivia are said to be married, counting back to the first episode. In this reunion movie, John and Olivia are celebrating their 40th wedding anniversary in 1969, which dates their wedding to 1929. However, in the first episode of the series aired in September 1972, it is supposedly set in 1933 ("The Foundling"), John Boy is 17 years old and he already has six brothers and sisters. In another episode, Olivia mentions that she was pregnant with her first child while her husband, John, was serving in the First World War, and that she prayed the child would be born a girl so that the child would not have fight in war, which suggests that John and Olivia were married to each other in or immediately prior to 1917. That would be consistent with a teenage John Boy in 1933.

=== Story ===
The story is about the family of John Walton Jr. (known as John-Boy): his six siblings, his parents John and Olivia Walton, and paternal grandparents Zebulon "Zeb" and Esther Walton. John-Boy is the first of the seven children (15 years old in The Homecoming; 17 at the beginning of the series), who becomes a journalist and novelist. Each episode is narrated at the opening and closing by a middle-aged John Jr. (voiced by author Earl Hamner on whom John-Boy is based). John Sr., who quit his city job after the traumatic events in the pilot episode, manages to eke out a living for his family by operating a lumber mill with the help of his sons as they grow older. The family income is augmented by some small-scale farming, and John occasionally hunts to put meat on the table. In the simpler days of their country youth, all of the children are rambunctious and curious, but as times grow tough, the children slowly depart from the innocent, carefree days of walking everywhere barefoot while clad in overalls and hand-sewn pinafores, and into the harsh, demanding world of accountability and responsibility.

The family shares hospitality with relatives and strangers as they are able. The small community named after their property is also home to folk of various income levels, ranging from the well-to-do Baldwin sisters, two spinsters who distill moonshine that they call "Papa's recipe;" Ike Godsey, postmaster and owner of the general store with his somewhat snobbish wife Corabeth (a Walton cousin; she calls her husband "Mr. Godsey"); an African-American couple, Verdie and Harley Foster; Maude Gormley, a presumptuous artist who paints on wood; Flossie Brimmer, a friendly though somewhat gossipy widow who runs a nearby boarding house; and Yancy Tucker, a good-hearted handyman with big plans but little motivation. Jefferson County sheriff Ep Bridges, who fought alongside John in World War and was awarded the Medal of Honor, keeps law and order in Walton's Mountain. The entire family (except for John) attends a Baptist church, of which Olivia and Grandma Esther are the most regular attendees.

In the signature scene that closes almost every episode, the family house is enveloped in darkness, save for 1, 2 or 3 lights in the upstairs bedroom windows. Through voice-overs, two or more characters make some brief comments related to that episode's events, and then bid each other goodnight, after which the lights go out.

After completing high school, John-Boy attends fictional Boatwright University in the fictional nearby town of Westham. He later goes to New York City to work as a journalist.

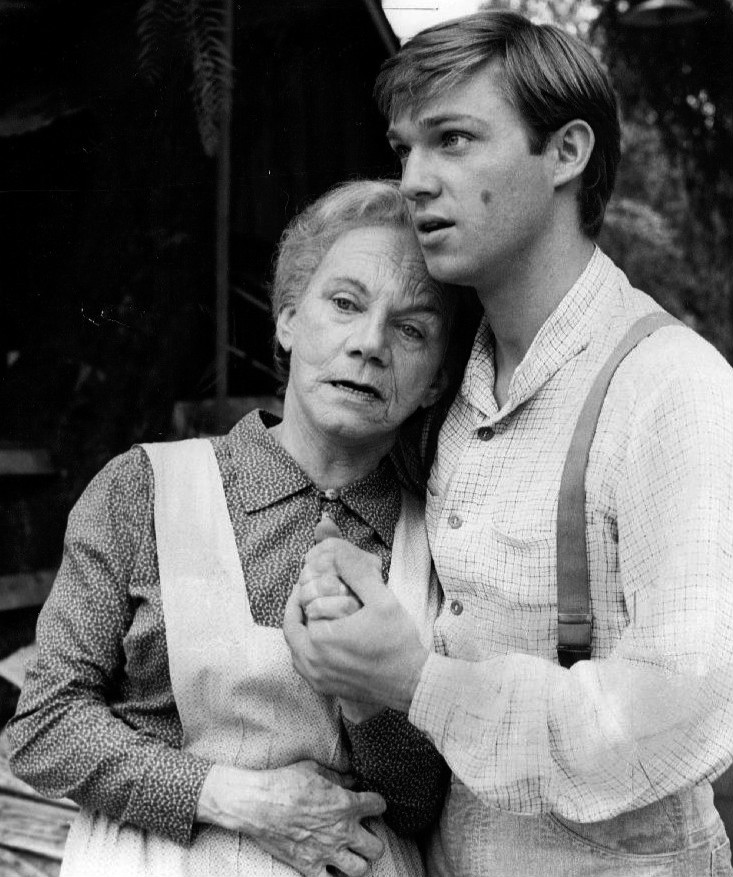
Grandma and John-Boy

During the latter half of the 1976–77 season, Grandma Esther Walton suffers a stroke and returns home shortly before the death of her husband, Grandpa Zeb Walton (reflecting Ellen Corby's real-life stroke and the death of Will Geer, the actors who portrayed those characters).

During the series' last few years, Mary Ellen and Ben start their own families; Erin, Jason and John-Boy are married in later television movie sequels. Younger children Jim-Bob and Elizabeth struggle to find and cement true love.

World War II deeply affects the family. All four Walton boys enlist in the armed services. Mary Ellen's physician husband, Curtis "Curt" Willard who is played by Tom Bower is sent to Pearl Harbor and is reported to have perished in the Japanese attack on December 7, 1941. Years later, Mary Ellen hears of sightings of her "late" husband, investigates and finds him alive (this time played by Scott Hylands), but brooding over his war wounds and living under an assumed name. She divorces him and later remarries.

John-Boy's military plane is shot down, while Olivia becomes a volunteer at the VA hospital and is seen less and less. She eventually develops tuberculosis and enters an Arizona sanatorium. Olivia's cousin, Rose Burton, moves in at the Walton house to look after the family. Two years later, John Sr. moves to Arizona to be with Olivia. Grandma appears in only a handful of episodes during the eighth season. She was usually said to be visiting relatives in nearby Buckingham County. Consistent with the effects of Ellen Corby's actual stroke, Grandma rarely speaks during the remainder of the series, usually limited to uttering brief one-or two-word lines such as "No!" or "Oh, boy!"

6 movies were made after the series run. Set from 1947 to 1969, they aired between 1982 and 1997.

== Characters ==
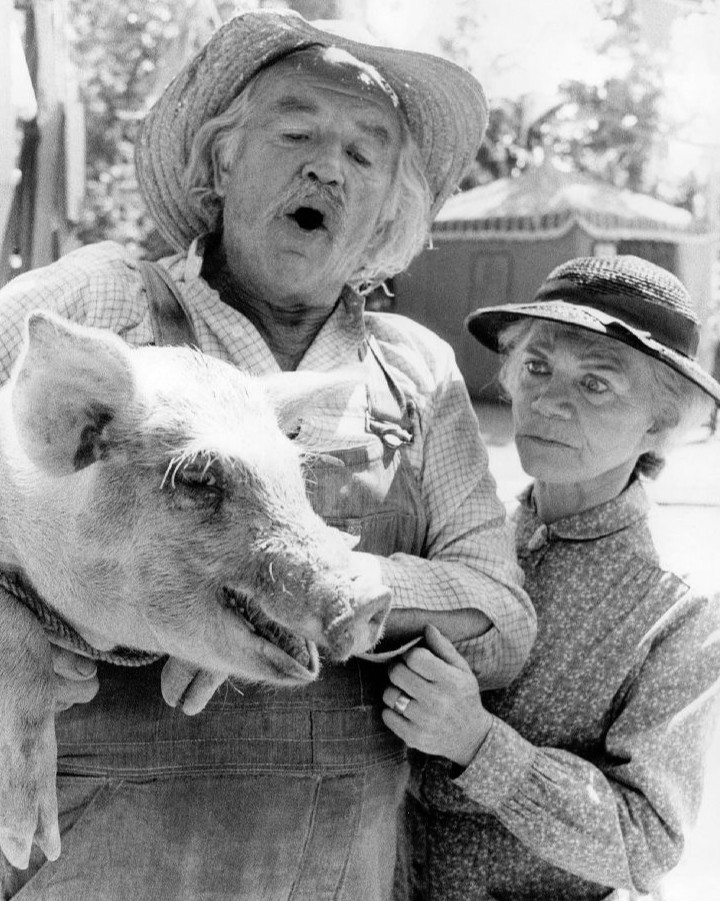
Grandpa and Grandma Walton

- John "John-Boy" Walton Jr. (Richard Thomas, seasons 1–5, guest season 6, three movies; Robert Wightman, seasons 8 & 9 and one movie), the eldest of the seven children
- John Walton Sr. (Ralph Waite, seasons 1–8, eight episodes of season 9 and all movies), the family patriarch (Andrew Duggan starred as John Sr. in The Homecoming movie only)
- Olivia Walton (Michael Learned, seasons 1–7, guest season 8, and four movies), the matriarch (Patricia Neal starred as Olivia in The Homecoming movie only)
- Zebulon "Grandpa" Walton (Will Geer, seasons 1–6), John's father (Edgar Bergen starred as Zeb in The Homecoming movie only). Grandpa's death was part of the first episode of the seventh season after Geer's death in 1978.
- Esther "Grandma" Walton (Ellen Corby, seasons 1–5 & 7, two episodes in seasons 6 & 8, and in five movies), John's mother
- Jason Walton (Jon Walmsley, entire series and six movies), second oldest Walton son; musically talented
- Mary Ellen Walton (Judy Norton, entire series and six movies), headstrong oldest daughter; becomes a nurse, then later a doctor.
- Erin Walton (Mary Elizabeth McDonough, entire series and six movies), second Walton daughter; works as a telephone operator and as manufacturing supervisor
- Benjamin "Ben" Walton (Eric Scott, entire series and six movies), third Walton son; has an entrepreneurial spirit
- James Robert "Jim-Bob" Walton (David W. Harper, entire series and six movies), youngest Walton son; mechanically inclined
- Elizabeth Walton (Kami Cotler, entire series and six movies), youngest of the seven children
- Ike Godsey (Joe Conley, entire series and six movies), proprietor of the general store (Woodrow Parfrey starred as Ike in The Homecoming movie only)
- Corabeth Walton Godsey (Ronnie Claire Edwards), seasons 3–9 (and six movies), John Walton's cousin, marries Ike
- Miss Mamie Baldwin (Helen Kleeb, entire series and five movies), neighbor
- Miss Emily Baldwin (Mary Jackson, entire series and five movies), neighbor
- Verdie Grant (Lynn Hamilton, (entire series and two movies), neighbor
- Rosemary Hunter (Mariclare Costello, seasons 1–6), schoolteacher, then marries Reverend Fordwick
- Reverend Matthew Fordwick (John Ritter), (seasons 1-5), minister of the Baptist Church, marries Miss Hunter
- Sheriff Ep Bridges (John Crawford, entire series), law officer
- Curtis Willard (Tom Bower, seasons 5–7), Mary Ellen's first husband
- Cindy Walton (Leslie Winston, seasons 7–9 and four movies), Ben's wife
- Rose Burton (Peggy Rea, seasons 8 & 9 and one movie), Olivia's cousin who fills in as the matriarch during Olivia's absence
- Drew Cutler (Tony Becker), (seasons 8 & 9 and five movies), Elizabeth's high school boyfriend, then fiancé
- Antoinette 'Toni' Hazleton Walton, (Lisa Harrison), (seasons 8 & 9 and three movies), Jason's wife
- Arlington 'Jonesy' Wescott Jones III (Richard Gilliland), (season 9 and three movies), Mary Ellen's second husband
- Yancy Tucker, (Robert Donner), (seasons 1-7 and two movies), neighbor and friend of the Waltons

== Production ==
=== Inspiration ===
Earl Hamner's rural childhood growing up in the unincorporated community of Schuyler, Virginia, provided the basis for the setting and many of the storylines of The Waltons. His family and the community provided many life experiences which aided in the characters, values, area, and human-interest stories of his books, movies, and television series. Hamner provided the voice-over of the older John-Boy, usually heard at the beginning and end of each episode.

John-Boy Walton's fictional alma mater, Boatwright University, is patterned after Richmond College, which became part of the University of Richmond on Boatwright Drive near Westham Station in The West End of Richmond, Virginia, about 70 miles (110 km) east of Schuyler.

=== Television film ===
The Homecoming: A Christmas Story (1971) was not made as a pilot for a series, but it was so popular that it led to CBS initially commissioning one season of episodes based on the same characters, and the result was The Waltons. Except for the Walton children and Grandma Esther Walton, the characters were all recast for the TV series. The musical score was by Oscar-winning composer Jerry Goldsmith and was later released on an album by Film Score Monthly paired with James Horner's score for the 1982 TV movie Rascals and Robbers: The Secret Adventures of Tom Sawyer and Huck Finn. (Goldsmith also scored several episodes of the first season, but the producers believed his TV movie theme was too gentle and requested he write a new theme for the series.) The series was also commissioned in response to the rural purge that the networks in general and CBS specifically had done that eliminated most rural-themed shows in 1971, and the subsequent backlash from fans of those shows that were still popular at the time of their cancelations.

Patricia Neal (as Olivia) won a Golden Globe Award for Best Actress - Television Series Drama. The movie was also nominated for 3 Emmys: Primetime Emmy Award for Outstanding Lead Actress in a Miniseries or a Movie (Neal), Outstanding Writing Achievement in Drama – Adaptation (Earl Hamner), and Outstanding Directorial Achievement in Drama – A Single Program (Fielder Cook).

=== Filming ===
The town of Walton's Mountain was built in the rear area of the main lot at Warner Bros. Studios, bordering the Los Angeles River, but the mountain itself was part of the Hollywood Hills range opposite Warner studios in Burbank, California. The façade of the Waltons house was built in the back of the Warner Brothers lot. After the series concluded, the set was destroyed, so for the reunion shows, another façade was built on the Here Come the Brides set on the old Columbia Ranch facility studio. The ranch backlot was later razed to accommodate more sound stages as part of a larger redevelopment.

For the first few seasons, exterior scenes were often shot in Frazier Park, 70 miles (110 km) to the north of Los Angeles. They also occasionally filmed scenes in Franklin Canyon Park in Beverly Hills.

Exteriors for The Homecoming were filmed in Teton National Forest near Jackson Hole, Wyoming.

=== Cast and crew ===
The cast and crew developed a strong working relationship, including notably a compatible teaming of Ralph Waite and Michael Learned as parents John and Olivia Walton. Some of the children who started in the cast of The Homecoming credited director Fielder Cook for working gently and effectively with its cast, largely made of children. A consequence of the relaxed and cordial working environment led to lasting close relationships among the cast.

== Release ==
=== Broadcast ===
Some sources indicate CBS put the show on its fall 1972 schedule in response to congressional hearings on the quality of television. Backlash from a 1971 decision to purge most rural-oriented shows from the network lineup may have also been a factor. The network gave The Waltons an undesirable timeslot – Thursdays at 8 p.m – opposite 2 popular programs: The Flip Wilson Show on NBC and The Mod Squad on ABC. "The rumor was that they put it against Flip Wilson and The Mod Squad because they didn't think it would survive. They thought, 'We can just tell Congress America doesn't want to see this'," Kami Cotler, who played Elizabeth Walton, said in a 2012 interview. However, CBS had enough faith in the show to devise a full-page newspaper ad flanked with the show's positive reviews, urging people to watch the show. Radically increased ratings were attributed to this ad, saving The Waltons.

Ralph Waite was reluctant to audition for the part of John Walton because he didn't want to be tied to a long-running TV series, but his agent persuaded him by saying, "It will never sell. You do the pilot. You pick up a couple of bucks and then you go back to New York."

Following the cancelation of the series in 1981, a total of six reunion movies were released: A Wedding on Walton's Mountain (1982), Mother's Day on Walton's Mountain (1982), A Day for Thanks on Walton's Mountain (1982), A Walton Thanksgiving Reunion (1993), A Walton Wedding (1995), and A Walton Easter (1997).

=== Syndication and reruns ===
Lorimar sold the distribution rights of The Waltons to Warner Bros. Television to avoid a lawsuit owing to the similarities between the series and the film Spencer's Mountain (1963), which Warner owned. Warner Bros. acquired Lorimar in 1989, and has continued to syndicate the series ever since.

In the UK, the series was broadcast on BBC2 and BBC1 and during the 1970s/1980s – the first three seasons were broadcast on BBC2 from February 18, 1974, to May 17, 1976, on Mondays at 20.00 GMT, and seasons 4 and 5 were shown on BBC1 from September 5, 1976, to August 30, 1977, on Sundays at 16.10 in 1976 and Tuesdays at 19.00 through 1977. After that, seasons 6–9 would be broadcast on BBC2 again, starting on April 30, 1979, and concluding in April 1983. The three reunion TV movies filmed in 1982 were also shown on BBC2 from December 21 to 28, 1983. The show was repeated on Channel 4 between 1986 and 1991 and again from 1996 to 2000. It aired on Sony Channel until March 31, 2020. In the UK the TV station 'Great TV' started airing re-runs from season one during the first week of January 2026.

=== Home media ===
Warner Home Video has released all nine seasons and six TV movies of The Waltons on DVD in Region 1. Seasons 1–4 have been released in Region 2. The pilot movie, The Homecoming: A Christmas Story, was released by Paramount Home Entertainment. Lorimar produced the series, CBS produced the pilot film, which is why Paramount, under CBS Home Entertainment, handles home video rights for The Homecoming.

German-release DVDs provide German or English soundtrack options, with dubbed German voices, or the original English soundtrack, although the German episode titles are not always either literal or precise translations of the original English-language titles.

DVD name	Episodes			
DVD name	Episodes	Region 1	Region 2 (UK)	Region 4 (AU)
The Homecoming: A Christmas Story	—N/a	September 23, 2003	—N/a	—N/a
The Complete 1st Season	24	May 11, 2004	November 1, 2004	November 11, 2015
The Complete 2nd Season	24	April 26, 2005	July 3, 2006	March 9, 2016
The Complete 3rd Season	24	April 25, 2006	September 11, 2006	May 11, 2016
The Complete 4th Season	24	January 23, 2007	March 5, 2007	July 13, 2016
The Complete 5th Season	24	May 8, 2007	—N/a	March 15, 2017
The Complete 6th Season	22	January 8, 2008	—N/a	August 9, 2017
The Complete 7th Season	23	April 29, 2008	—N/a	November 8, 2017
The Complete 8th Season	24	January 6, 2009	—N/a	March 7, 2018
The Complete 9th Season	22	April 28, 2009	—N/a	March 7, 2018
TV movie Collection (not including the original movie)	6	January 26, 2010	—N/a	—N/a

=== Streaming ===
Seasons 1–9 are available via streaming in standard-definition as well as high-definition video through services such as Amazon Prime Video.

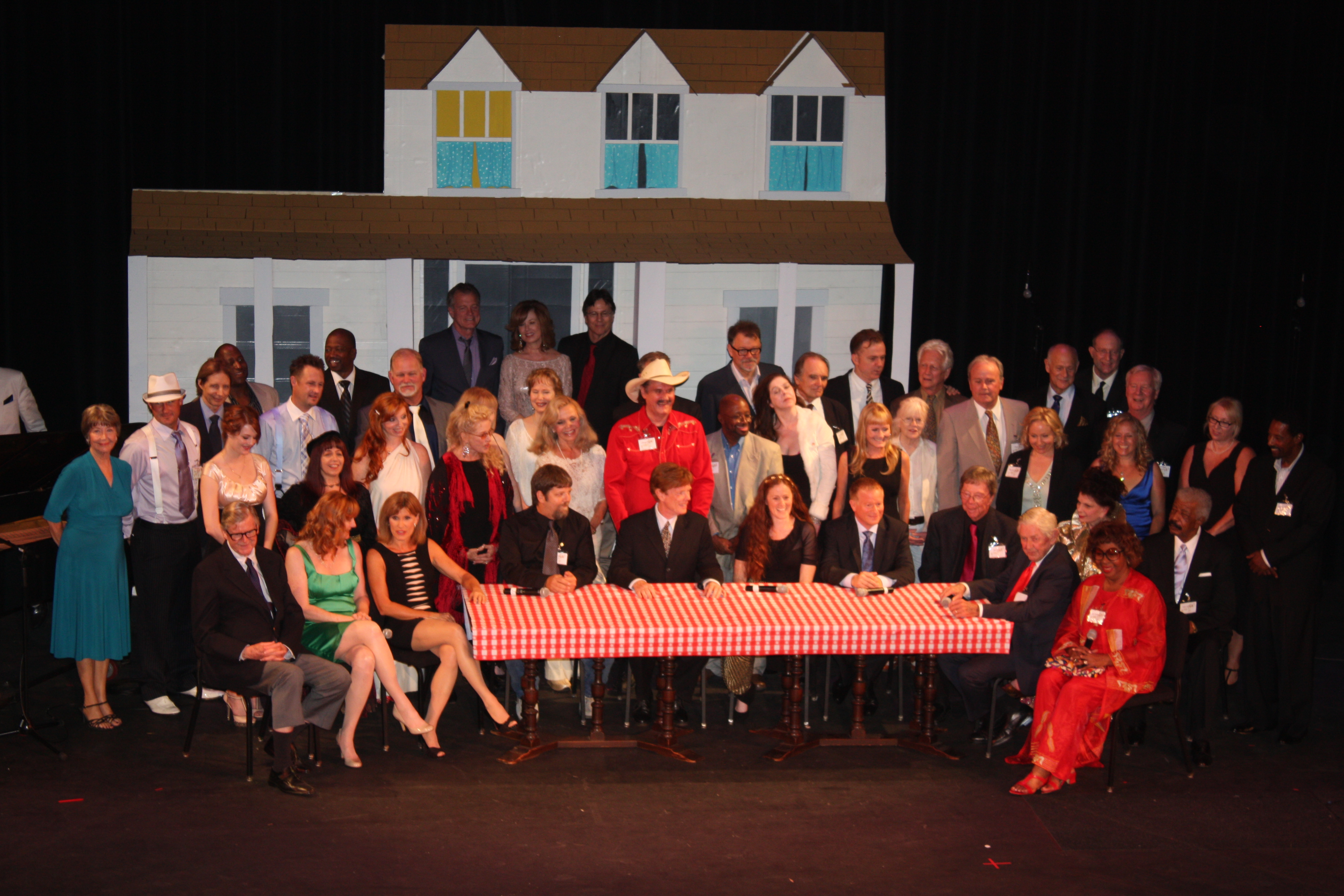
The cast at the 40th Anniversary of the show in 2012

== Reception ==
=== Accolades ===
The Waltons won the Primetime Emmy Award for Outstanding Drama Series in 1973. Also in 1973, Richard Thomas won the Emmy for Lead Actor in a Drama Series. Michael Learned won the Emmy for Lead Actress in a Drama Series 3 times (1973, 1974, and 1976). Ellen Corby was also a three-time winner in the Supporting Actress category, winning in 1973, 1975, and 1976. Will Geer was awarded the Supporting Actor Emmy in 1975. Veteran actress Beulah Bondi won an Emmy in 1977 for Lead Actress in a Single Performance for her guest appearance as Martha Corrine Walton in the episode "The Pony Cart" (Episode #111). She first appeared in The Waltons episode "The Conflict" (Episode #51) as the widow of Zeb Walton's brother.

The series itself earned a Peabody Award for its first season. In 2013, TV Guide ranked The Waltons No. 34 on its list of the 60 Best Series of All Time.

In 2017, from March 20 to 24, INSP network remembered the life of Earl Hamner Jr. (who died in 2016) by featuring clips of interviews (once per episode) with him about his time involved with The Waltons during the breaks while its syndicated reruns aired from 3–5pm and again at 7 pm.

=== Cultural significance ===
On January 27, 1992, then-President George H. W. Bush said, "We are going to keep on trying to strengthen the American family, to make American families a lot more like the Waltons and a lot less like the Simpsons." In response, The Simpsons made a short animated segment for a repeat showing of the episode "Stark Raving Dad", in which the family watches the speech, and Bart remarks, "Hey, we're just like the Waltons. We're prayin' for an end to the Depression, too."

== Reboot TV films ==
On November 28, 2021, The CW aired The Waltons: Homecoming, a remake of The Homecoming: A Christmas Story. Also set in 1933, this film features the Walton family (portrayed by new actors) minus Ben, waiting for John to get home by bus. Richard Thomas narrated. Executive producer Sam Haskell hoped the movie would lead to a new series. Another film A Waltons Thanksgiving aired on November 20, 2022. In it, Ben was added to the family. Ratings for the second reboot film were much lower.

== Behind the Scenes with Judy Norton ==
On July 14, 2020, Judy Norton (Mary Ellen) launched a series on her YouTube channel entitled "Behind the Scenes with Judy Norton", where she shares information about The Waltons' filming, cast, episodes, storylines, and cast reunions. She regularly takes the opportunity to answer viewer questions, with more than 100 "Ask Judy" episodes, and she has also hosted several former cast members as well as one of the show's directors, Ralph Senensky. As of July 2025, the playlist contains 540+ videos, with new releases every few days.

== See also ==
- These Are the Days; short-lived animated Saturday morning TV series produced by Hanna-Barbera which was inspired by The Waltons
