= List of The Waltons episodes =

American historical drama television series (1972–1981)

The Waltons is an American historical drama television series about a family in rural Virginia during the Great Depression and World War II. It was created by Earl Hamner Jr., based on his 1961 book Spencer's Mountain and the 1963 film of the same title. The series aired from 1972 to 1981.

== Series overview ==
Season	Episodes	Originally released		Rank	Rating
Season	Episodes	First released	Last released	Rank	Rating
Television Film		December 19, 1971		—N/a	—N/a
1	25	September 14, 1972	April 19, 1973	19	20.6 (Note: Tied with The Partridge Family and Medical Center)
2	25	September 13, 1973	March 14, 1974	2	28.1
3	25	September 12, 1974	March 6, 1975	8	25.5
4	25	September 11, 1975	March 4, 1976	14	22.9 (Note: Tied with M*A*S*H)
5	25	September 23, 1976	March 17, 1977	15	22.3 (Note: Tied with Little House on the Prairie)
6	26	September 15, 1977	March 30, 1978	20	20.8 (Note: Tied with The ABC Sunday Night Movie)
7	24	September 21, 1978	March 22, 1979	37	19.0
8	24	September 20, 1979	March 13, 1980	—N/a	—N/a
9	22	November 27, 1980	June 4, 1981	30	18.6
TV Movies	6	February 22, 1982	April 27, 1997	—N/a	—N/a

== Episodes ==
=== Television film (1971) ===
Title	Directed by	Written by	Original release date
The Homecoming: A Christmas Story	Fielder Cook	Earl Hamner Jr.	December 19, 1971
On Christmas Eve 1933, the Waltons are preparing for the holiday. However, John, who has taken work in Waynesboro, Virginia, about 50 miles (80 km) away, is late returning home, and his family is becoming increasingly worried. Note: Several of the lead actors are different from those in the series, including Andrew Duggan as John Walton Sr., Patricia Neal as Olivia Walton, Edgar Bergen as Grandpa Zeb Walton, William Windom as Charlie Snead, and Cleavon Little as Hawthorne Dooley. All of the children, and Grandma Walton, are played by the same actors as in the series. David Huddleston, who played Sheriff Ep Bridges in the pilot, would return in the first season "The Literary Man" as writer A.J. Covington. Ike Godsey was played by Woodrow Parfrey, Mamie Baldwin by Josephine Hutchinson, and Emily Baldwin by Dorothy Stickney.

=== Season 1 (1972–1973) ===
No. overall	No. in season	Title	Directed by	Written by	Original release date
1	1	"The Foundling"	Vincent Sherman	John McGreevey	September 14, 1972
The Waltons shelter a deaf girl (Erica Hunton) left on their porch by her mother because her father insists on institutionalizing her. While they search for her family, they start teaching her sign language, which she uses to help Elizabeth when an emergency arises.
2	2	"The Carnival"	Alf Kjellin	Nigel McKeand	September 21, 1972
A traveling carnival comes to Walton's Mountain, but the children choose to sacrifice the money they had saved for it so that Grandma can replace her broken glasses. When the troupe becomes stranded by their dishonest ringmaster, John and Olivia allow them to stay in their barn, and the family is rewarded with a private show.
3	3	"The Calf"	Harry Harris	Jim Byrnes	September 28, 1972
The Waltons' cow gives birth to a bull calf, which John decides must be sold for truck repair money, much to his children's disappointment. John buys the calf back after he learns the buyer (Leonard Stone) plans to butcher rather than breed it.
4	4	"The Hunt"	Robert Butler	John McGreevey	October 5, 1972
John-Boy is anxious to prove himself on a turkey hunt with his father and two friends but finds he can't shoot a turkey, which he equates with premeditated murder. However, he has no trouble killing a bear when it attacks his father.
5	5	"The Typewriter"	Philip Leacock	Theodore Apstein	October 12, 1972
John-Boy borrows an antique typewriter from the Baldwin sisters so he can submit a proper manuscript to a magazine. Mary Ellen inadvertently sells the typewriter to a traveling junk dealer (George Tobias). Fortunately, Sheriff Bridges is able to help her track it down.
6	6	"The Star"	Alf Kjellin	John McGreevey	October 19, 1972
A meteorite crashes through the roof of the Baldwin sisters' "Recipe" room, which they take as some kind of sign from their dead Papa. Grandpa takes it as a sign of his impending death; Ben takes it as a sign he will win the fourth-grade spelling bee. Cousin Polonius Baldwin (Iggie Wolfington) at first plans to exploit the meteorite for financial gain, then tries to steal their "Recipe machine".
7	7	"The Sinner"	Philip Leacock	John Furia, Jr.	October 26, 1972
A young preacher, Matthew Fordwick (John Ritter), comes to Walton's Mountain fresh from seminary, where he has learned the currently-popular fire and brimstone style of preaching. He happens to be a Baldwin relative, and after a visit, succumbs to the effects of their "Recipe". His tee-totaler church superior fires him, but after he humbly apologizes to John-Boy for his hypocrisy, Grandpa and John convince the congregation to look at the forgiving side of the gospel and accept him.
8	8	"The Boy From the C.C.C."	Harry Harris	William Welch	November 2, 1972
A troubled teenager from Hell's Kitchen, Manhattan, whose father was murdered by a gangster, runs away from the Civilian Conservation Corps to Walton's Mountain. The Waltons take him in and teach him that he can trust some people, and he doesn't have to fight for everything he gets.
9	9	"The Ceremony"	Vincent Sherman	Nigel McKeand	November 9, 1972
A Jewish Nazi-refugee family moves to Walton's Mountain from Germany. Expecting to find similar antisemitism in America, the bitter, distrustful father, Professor Mann, chooses to protect his family by hiding their faith, and cancels plans for his son's impending bar mitzvah. The paranoid couple rebuff the Waltons' every attempt at a visitation. John-Boy discovers the family secret and helps the boy find a rabbi to conduct his bar mitzvah while the others open their home for the ceremony. Grandpa convinces the father not to deny his faith and to honor his son by attending.
10	10	"The Legend"	Lee Philips	John McGreevey	November 16, 1972
John's World War I buddy (Jim Antonio) visits. After he accidentally sets off a grass fire, for which Jason is blamed, and wounds the family dog on a hunting trip, John discovers his friend has not been able to put away the horrors of the war and continue with his life.
11	11	"The Literary Man"	Philip Leacock	Colley Cibber	November 30, 1972
A.J. Covington (David Huddleston), a wandering, well-read man claiming to be a writer, comes to Walton's Mountain and befriends John-Boy, helping him with his writing. But A.J. must come to terms with the fact that, after an initial success, he has spent most of his life in search of "the big story" and has avoided actual writing for fear of failure. John-Boy begins to back away from writing when he thinks it is interfering with his family's needs and that it causes him to forget his family duties. Still, A.J. encourages him to find value in writing about the little things and begins to think about settling down on the mountain. Meanwhile, Jim-Bob is stricken with appendicitis, and, though his surgery is successful, his family is left with a steep bill. A.J. decides to lend them the money and moves on once more, leaving them a farewell letter signed "Andy,” the name only his closest friends know him by.
12	12	"The Dust Bowl Cousins"	Robert Butler	Paul Savage	December 7, 1972
John's cousin (Jay W. MacIntosh), her husband (Warren Vanders) and children seek refuge in Walton's Mountain after losing their Kansas farm to the Dust Bowl, but her husband has developed a bad attitude toward misfortune. He has taught their son that the world owes them something. They shoplift from Godsey's store, and stay longer than expected. The son makes advances to Mary Ellen and fights with John-Boy before their departure.
13	13	"The Reunion"	Jack Shea	Earl Hamner	December 14, 1972
The Baldwin sisters plan to hold a family reunion when their cousin Homer (Denver Pyle) visits, but Homer runs off with their batch of over 100 jars of the "Recipe" intended for the reunion, planning to sell it in Charlottesville. Then, all of their invitations are returned because the intended recipients are either dead or moved away. The Waltons make up for the failed reunion with a family visit to cheer the disappointed sisters.
14	14	"The Minstrel"	Philip Leacock	John Furia Jr.	December 21, 1972
A young wandering musician named Jamie visits the mountain, while John gets a contract for the family to pick apples on the deadline. Mary Ellen thinks Jamie will help her fulfill her dreams of travel and adventure. While picking apples, John-Boy falls and breaks his wrist. Mary Ellen runs away with Jamie, then learns a hard lesson when he tells her he won't be "tied down" by anybody and continues without her. She returns home to the family, who use some apple-picking profits to fund her trip with friends.
15	15	"The Actress"	Vincent Sherman	William Bast	January 4, 1973
Alvira Drummond (Pippa Scott), a famous stage and screen actress, is invited to stay at the Walton home after her car breaks down in Walton's Mountain. Contrary to the front she puts up; she is out of work and money after her agent, tired of dealing with her "prima donna" attitude. After she learns a humbling lesson, the Waltons help her regain her confidence, then organize a town performance to help her raise money for a train ticket back to New York.
16	16	"The Fire"	Harry Harris	Earl Hamner	January 11, 1973
After learning that schoolteacher Miss Hunter is teaching evolution to his daughter, religious fanatic Louis Bascomb (Richard Bradford) breaks into the Baldwins' and steals some Recipe. He gets drunk and beats his daughter Lois May (Laurie Prange), and uses the remaining Recipe to burn down the school, killing himself in the process. Ike lets Miss Hunter use some extra space in his store for temporary classrooms until the county can build a new school. Olivia contacts the girl's mother, who had run away from her abusive husband, and the woman returns to look after her daughter.
17	17	"The Love Story"	Lee Philips	Earl Hamner	January 18, 1973
Jenny Pendleton (Sian Barbara Allen), whose mother died years ago, runs away from her father and stepmother, back to her deserted house in Walton's Mountain. Jenny and John-Boy meet and fall deeply in love, but she is soon traumatized by her father's sudden accidental death and ultimately moves away with the stepmother.
18	18	"The Courtship"	Harry Harris	Jeb Rosebrook	January 25, 1973
Olivia's uncle, Cody Nelson (Eduard Franz), visits from Cincinnati. He is a bachelor and a bank accountant, near retirement but put out of work by the bank closings. They attempt to cheer him up by introducing him to a lively, spirited local widow, who charms him and he begins to court her. He is discouraged after learning of her four marriages (two divorces and two deaths), but when he hears good news about the banks, he finally resolves to ask her to marry him.
19	19	"The Gypsies"	Harry Harris	Paul Savage	February 1, 1973
A gypsy family, stranded with a broken wagon during a thunderstorm, break into the temporarily unoccupied Baldwin house for shelter. Despite hostility from others in the community, the Waltons allow them to camp on their property while Grandma tends their sick baby.
20	20	"The Deed"	Vincent Sherman	James Menzies	February 8, 1973
When a lumber company tries to claim the Mountain, the family discovers that their ancestors never filed for legal title to their land. They must raise $200 to obtain the deed, and the entire family tries to chip in. Against his father's wishes, John-Boy decides to take time off from school to work in Wheeling. On payday, he is robbed of his pay by two men while leaving a tavern. He encounters the same pair a few days later and asks a nearby policeman to arrest them.
21	21	"The Scholar"	Lee Philips	John McGreevey	February 22, 1973
Verdie Grant (Lynn Hamilton) asks John-Boy to teach her how to read and write, on the condition that he keep it a strict secret. She is motivated to travel to Richmond to see her youngest daughter Sarah graduate from college. A misunderstanding causes Verdie to assume John-Boy betrayed her confidence, and she angrily stops the lessons, despite his attempt to explain. After asking him to read Sarah's letter to her, she relents, which implores her to come to the graduation. She completes the lessons and makes the trip to Richmond, becoming a good Walton family friend.
22	22	"The Bicycle"	Alf Kjellin	Nigel McKeand	March 1, 1973
Frustrated with the burden of her domestic obligations, Olivia buys a used bicycle, which awakens some of her dormant dreams as she starts singing in the church choir again. Meanwhile, John-Boy helps blacksmith Curtis Norton (Ned Beatty) woo a "mail-order bride" by ghost-writing letters for him. When the city-raised girl arrives with big dreams, she becomes disillusioned with Curtis' bucolic ways, becomes angry when she discovers John-Boy wrote the letters, and cancels the engagement. Olivia's experience reminds her that dreams don't always work out and don't replace family benefits. She convinces the girl to accept Curtis and loans her the bicycle to go after him.
23	23	"The Townie"	Jack Shea	Richard Fielder	March 8, 1973
John-Boy's friend Sarah Jane Simmonds (Sissy Spacek) wants to marry him to escape her strict, overprotective mother, but he rejects the idea. She then secretly dates a "townie," a spoiled rich boy named Theodore "Ted" Albert Claypool Jr. (Nicholas Hammond), who drives a LaSalle coupe, and exasperates John-Boy by expressing admiration for the notorious John Dillinger. He steals money and a gun from his father and takes Sarah Jane off to Maryland to elope. John-Boy pursues them and finds them both injured outside the overturned LaSalle. Ted pulls the gun on John-Boy and tries to take the Walton truck, but John and Ted's father show up.
24	24	"An Easter Story"	Philip Leacock	Story by : Earl Hamner; Teleplay by : John McGreevey	April 19, 1973
25	25	"An Easter Story"	Philip Leacock	Story by : Earl Hamner; Teleplay by : John McGreevey	April 19, 1973
Olivia is stricken with polio after returning from church. When pain and fatigue turn into numbness and paralysis, she faces the prospect of permanent disability with courage. Meanwhile, Jason enters an amateur talent show, playing and singing a song Grandma inspires him to compose with her housework: “The Ironing Board Blues”; he wins the contest and a new guitar. The family watches him perform, and back at home, they reenact the contest for Olivia and Erin. When John-Boy checks in to apply at the University of Virginia, he seeks out a doctor who specializes in the treatment of polio, and he tells John-Boy of an unorthodox, experimental treatment developed by Sister Elizabeth Kenny. Olivia tries the exercises against the realistic and pessimistic advice of the local doctor. At first, she has hope of recovery by Easter, but then she becomes discouraged and resigns herself to life in a wheelchair. However, shortly before Easter, she dreams that Elizabeth calls out for help, and she gets up out of bed without effort. She attends the Easter sunrise service on the mountain with her family, celebrating the apparent miracle. In 2009, TV Guide ranked this episode #77 on its list of the 100 Greatest Episodes.

=== Season 2 (1973–1974) ===
No. overall	No. in season	Title	Directed by	Written by	Original release date
26	1	"The Journey"	Harry Harris	Nigel McKeand	September 13, 1973
Maggie McKenzie (Linda Watkins), an elderly widowed neighbor in failing health, asks John-Boy to take her to Virginia Beach, but he has plans to take a girl to a dance. He finally breaks his date and takes Mrs. McKenzie to the shore, where she relives memories of her honeymoon and arrival from Scotland.
27	2	"The Odyssey"	Jack Shea	Joanna Lee	September 20, 1973
Needing some alone time, John-Boy hikes up the mountain to a deserted cabin and finds his friend Sarah Jane Simmons (Sissy Spacek) hiding, nine months pregnant. Her mother had placed her with a well-to-do family on the promise they would educate her. But they were only interested in using her as a servant, so she ran away and married a young man who went looking for work with the Works Progress Administration. A rainstorm strands John-Boy and Sarah, and he must deliver the baby.
28	3	"The Separation"	Philip Leacock	Story by : Ellen Corby; Teleplay by : Richard Carr	September 27, 1973
The Waltons' electricity is shut off when they are unable to pay the bill. Sent to buy candles, Grandpa offers to do a house repair job for the Baldwins, for cash and the use of their car to pay the bill in Charlottesville. They accept, provided he takes them with him. Worried sick, jealous, and angry when he is gone all day, Esther refuses to listen to his explanation. Zeb leaves, sleeping on the pool table in Ike's store. Zeb and Esther's pride escalates to the point that he talks of leaving her for good until Olivia suggests Grandma attend the upcoming square dance, where the caller is Zeb's old rival for her affection.
29	4	"The Theft"	Harry Harris	Robert Malcolm Young	October 4, 1973
A wealthy widow accuses John of stealing family silver after he has done a repair job for her. He suspiciously has come into some extra money and refuses to say where he got it because he sold his wedding ring to a pawn shop. It turns out the family's son has sold the silver, hiding from his mother that their wealth is gone.
30	5	"The Roots"	Philip Leacock	Sheldon Stark	October 11, 1973
Harley Foster, an unemployed mechanic turned migrant worker, comes to the mountain with his young son Jody, with whom he has been traveling the country. They sleep in the Waltons' barn. Verdie Grant takes a great interest in him and the boy and asks John-Boy to play matchmaker. After Harley repairs the Waltons' car, John-Boy gets Ike to hire Harley as a mechanic. Jody longs to settle down, and Verdie wants him to go to school. But Harley will have none of it and angrily decides to leave. In desperation, the boy steals money from Ike's till so that Harley will be arrested and have to stay put. After Jody confesses, Harley changes his mind, apologizes to Verdie, and stays in Walton's Mountain.
31	6	"The Chicken Thief"	Ralph Senensky	Richard Carr	October 18, 1973
John-Boy faces a dilemma when he sees Yancy Tucker (Robert Donner) steal two chickens, and if he remains silent, the law considers him complicit. Yancy has been playing Robin Hood, giving the chickens to people worse off. He promises to return them to their owner, Charlie Potter (Richard O'Brien) so that John-Boy is off the hook. When he does, Charlie is shot in the leg. Now Yancy is in jail until John figures out that Charlie accidentally shot himself.
32	7	"The Prize"	Philip Leacock	Dale Eunson	October 25, 1973
Olivia's childhood sweetheart Oscar Cockrell (Peter Donat) comes to visit. He is a politician running for the state legislature and unhappily married. The Waltons go to the county fair, and Oscar is one of the judges. Olivia wins a $5 first prize for her cake. Yancy loans Ben a pig for the greased pig contest. Farmer George Porter (Dana Elcar) catches the pig, recognizes it as one of his own from its earmark, and demands either the pig or $5. Oscar wants to pay the money for Olivia, but she gives Ben her prize money.
33	8	"The Braggart"	Jack Shea	Richard Fielder	November 1, 1973
Hobbie Shank, (Michael McGreevey) a teenage orphan, stays with the Waltons. John-Boy dislikes him, as his charming, talkative banter keeps the girls from their chores. Hobbie's skill at baseball attracts talented scouts and a chance at the big leagues until a fall threatens his future.
34	9	"The Fawn"	Ralph Waite	John McGreevey	November 8, 1973
Erin finds an orphaned baby deer in the woods and intends to keep it, which is illegal. When they return it to the woods, poachers are caught shooting it, so Erin gets to keep it while it recovers. The game warden offers Erin a compromise: instead of releasing it into the wild, he can put it in a wildlife preserve where she can visit it. She finally understands releasing it is best. John-Boy gets a job as a rent collector for a local landlord, Graham Foster (Charles Tyner), and learns the man is dishonorable and miserly. His rents are higher than many tenants can pay in full, and he refuses to make needed repairs. He refuses to pay John-Boy's 5% commission since the shortfall in collections exceeds this and fires him. John-Boy recovers his commission by making the repairs with Jason and gives the man his change.
35	10	"The Thanksgiving Story"	Philip Leacock	Story by : Earl Hamner; Teleplay by : Joanna Lee	November 15, 1973
36	11	"The Thanksgiving Story"	Philip Leacock	Story by : Earl Hamner; Teleplay by : Joanna Lee	November 15, 1973
Jenny Pendleton (Sian Barbara Allen) returns for a visit with her stepmother. John-Boy is hit by a loose fan belt while working the mill and knocked down. He conceals his dizziness and blurred vision because he wants to take an entrance exam for Boatwright University, but he cannot finish it. He has a risky operation to remove a blood clot from his brain. After the operation, Miss Hunter persuades the college, against doctors' advice, to allow him to retake the exam, and he is accepted, winning a scholarship. Meanwhile, Jason helps the lonely Baldwins make a supply of moonshine, after which they want to adopt him, but John and Olivia refuse.
37	12	"The Substitute"	Lee Philips	John McGreevey	November 22, 1973
When Miss Hunter is called away because of a family emergency, the school board (which John sits) hires a substitute teacher (Catherine Burns), who travels from New York City to fill in. The young woman has excellent teaching credentials but lacks interpersonal skills and, staying at the Waltons' house, eats her meals alone in her locked room. She counsels John-Boy not to write so emotionally. Her strict teaching style is so insensitive to individual children's needs that many refuse to go to school. John is appointed to resolve the issue, but she resigns. Olivia convinces her not to distance herself from people, and she changes her methods. When she leaves, the children are sorry to see her go.
38	13	"The Bequest"	Alf Kjellin	Mort Thaw	November 29, 1973
Grandma receives a letter informing her that an old friend has died and bequeathed her $250, which she decides to share with the family and church. The family uses John-Boy's current college fund to replace the broken water heater since Grandma has promised to replace it. But then another letter comes, with the news that the deceased woman's medical debts exceed her assets, so the legacy cannot be honored. Grandma is ashamed and afraid to face John-Boy until he tells her that he loves her no matter what.
39	14	"The Air Mail Man"	Robert Butler	Peter L. Dixon & Sarah Dixon	December 13, 1973
The evening before Olivia's birthday, an air mail pilot (Michael Glaser) is forced to make an emergency landing in Walton's pasture. He stays the night until he can fix his plane. He hides that he has run away from his pregnant wife until she comes looking for him. After discussing his fears of fatherhood with John, he decides not to leave her and gives Olivia a short ride on his plane before returning to his wife.
40	15	"The Triangle"	Lee Philips	Lionel E. Siegel	December 20, 1973
John-Boy's teacher, Miss Hunter, meets with him to critique an essay he is writing about a special person in his life but does not realize he is writing about her. Meanwhile, Rev. Fordwick starts regularly dating Miss Hunter and takes her to the community picnic, making John-Boy hurt and jealous.
41	16	"The Awakening"	Lee Philips	Joanna Lee	January 3, 1974
Growing pains cause havoc on Walton's Mountain. Grandma's upset as her 68th birthday approaches, qualifying her for an "Old Age" pension, and she frustrates everyone by refusing to seek help for dizziness and a hearing problem. John-Boy craves private, quiet space for an office in an attached cabin, but Mary Ellen is told she can use the space as her bedroom. A visiting college boy Mary Ellen encounters at the lake plunges her into confusion when he kisses her, despite being several years older.
42	17	"The Honeymoon"	Jack Shea	John McGreevey	January 10, 1974
No one helps with the chores, Reckless runs across Olivia's just-mopped kitchen floor, and she threatens a sit-down strike. After 19 years of marriage, John takes Olivia to Virginia Beach, Virginia for the honeymoon they never had. Grandpa sells his 1864 2-cent piece to Ike to finance their trip. Marcia Woolery (Tammi Bula) pressures John-Boy for a relationship commitment, causing him to break up with her. While walking outdoors with her, he falls and dislocates his shoulder. John and Olivia get caught in a rainstorm on their way to their hotel, as do the children who come down with head colds. John and Olivia take a romantic walk on the beach and build a sandcastle. After reading about a fire on the mountain, Olivia phones Ike, who tells her the fire is far away but blabs about everything else that has been going on. Olivia insists they hurry home. Marcia informs John-Boy she's already dating someone else.
43	18	"The Heritage"	Harry Harris	Dale Eunson	January 17, 1974
A mysterious stranger (Noah Beery) comes and samples the Waltons' hot spring water, then returns to offer John $5,000 to sell the mountain, claiming he wants to retire on it, but John is unwilling. Later, the man admits he represents developers who want to build a tourist resort on the mountain and increases the offer to $25,000. Now John leans toward accepting it, thinking they can keep the house. Even though his ancestors are buried on the mountain, John knows the money will greatly benefit his family, especially John-Boy's education. When the man returns to close the deal, he raises the offer to $30,000, informing them the developers want to remove the house, and offer John a job as a hunting/fishing guide. After much anguish, he decides his family's heritage mustn't be sold.
44	19	"The Gift"	Ralph Senensky	Story by : Ray Goldrup & Jack Hanrahan; Teleplay by : Carol Evan McKeand	January 24, 1974
Jason's friend Seth Turner (Ron Howard), who shares his love for music, carves a recorder from an apple tree branch Jason gives him and offers to teach Jason how to play it. He learns he has been stricken with leukemia and has only a year to live. Jason and Seth's mother take it extremely hard, but after the initial shock, Seth and his father resolve to make the most of the remaining time. Seth carves Jason's name in the recorder and gives it to him to remember him by.
45	20	"The Cradle"	Ralph Senensky	Joanna Lee	January 31, 1974
Olivia is pregnant for the 8th time and fears bringing another child into the world during the Depression. Elizabeth, at first, is unhappy to learn she won't be the baby anymore, especially after being taunted about it by Jim-Bob; but then looks forward to the possibility of a baby sister. But it is not to be when Olivia miscarries.
46	21	"The Fulfillment"	Nick Webster	Michael Russnow & Tony Kayden	February 7, 1974
The Waltons bring home Stevie (Tiger Williams), a troubled young orphan, to stay with them. Meanwhile, Ann, the wife of town blacksmith Curtis Norton (Victor French), is told she will not be able to bear children. She stays in denial, as Curtis and Stevie take a liking to each other. Olivia doesn't want to force the idea of adoption on Ann, but John-Boy tells Ann that love isn't like money, in that one can't save it up for the future. She changes her mind, and the Nortons adopt Stevie.
47	22	"The Ghost Story"	Ralph Waite	Nigel McKeand	February 14, 1974
The Waltons bring Luke, a boy whose mother he loved very much, into their home while his father tries to find work out of town. Ike gives John-Boy a "spirit board", which his writer's curiosity leads him to investigate. As he and the children play with it, the "spirit" apparently delivers the fragmentary message "Luke .. must not ..." A series of circumstances then seem to conspire to prevent the family from getting Luke on a train to go to his father. Then they hear on the radio that a serious accident has derailed the train.
48	23	"The Graduation"	Alf Kjellin	Lionel E. Siegel	February 21, 1974
John-Boy's high school graduation approaches, and the family buys him a new suit. After the family's beloved cow Chance dies, John-Boy sells the suit back to give him the cash to replace the cow despite his father's objection. Grandma and Olivia replace the suit by altering the tweed suit Grandpa was saving for his burial.
49	24	"The Five Foot Shelf"	Ralph Waite	John Hawkins	March 7, 1974
When a traveling salesman, George Reed (Ben Piazza), comes selling the 50-volume set of Harvard Classics, Olivia makes a $3 down payment, since they will replace some of John-Boy's required college books and help satisfy her occasional desire for adventure. She also allows the salesman to stay in the barn. But instead of ordering the books, he uses the money to buy his daughter a doll from Ike's store. When John and John-Boy figure out his deception, John demands the money back but decides just to banish him and write it off as a lesson learned when he sees how desperation has overridden the man's ethics and sense of pride. The man's conscience finally wins out: he persuades Ike to buy the doll back and returns the money to the Waltons. After this, Olivia still decides to buy the books.
50	25	"The Car"	Philip Leacock	Chris Andrews	March 14, 1974
John-Boy looks to buy a car he will need to get to college. On a tip, he offers to repair the storm damage to the home of a reclusive couple (Ed Lauter and Bonnie Bartlett) in exchange for the beautiful car they keep in their garage. The man grudgingly accepts but proves unwilling to part with the car because it belonged to his son, who is dead. After his wife threatens to leave him, and John-Boy gets him to talk about his son, he relents.

=== Season 3 (1974–1975) ===
No. overall	No. in season	Title	Directed by	Written by	Original release date
51	1	"The Conflict"	Ralph Senensky	Jeb Rosebrook	September 12, 1974
52	2	"The Conflict"	Ralph Senensky	Jeb Rosebrook	September 12, 1974
The family visits some of their hill-folk kin, Grandpa's sister-in-law: Martha Corinne (Beulah Bondi), her son Boone (Morgan Woodward), and his married grandson Wade (Richard Hatch). They are being forced off their property by a Civilian Conservation Corps project to build a national park and federal highway. Grandpa supports them in their determination to take up arms against the government if necessary to defend Walton's land, which puts him at odds with John-Boy. John tries, with the help of Virginia senator Lucas Avery (Paul Fix), to appeal the state's decision to displace the family but is unsuccessful. Martha Corinne finally relents when a marshal shoots John-Boy.
53	3	"The First Day"	Philip Leacock	John McGreevey	September 19, 1974
The family is excited about John-Boy's first day at Boatwright College, but hazing from older boys and bureaucratic red tape make it less than idyllic. Back on the mountain, Jason finds it hard to step into John-Boy's shoes at school and home.
54	4	"The Thoroughbred"	Harry Harris	Michael Russnow & Tony Kayden	September 26, 1974
John-Boy enters his mule, Blue, in a local race in which Grandpa was the last Walton to win. He finds himself in competition with one of his wealthy classmates, who not only enters a thoroughbred horse but also competes with him for the attention of a female student, Selina (Kathleen Quinlan), the granddaughter of the race's sponsor. John-Boy narrowly wins the race and learns a lesson in good sportsmanship.
55	5	"The Runaway"	Harry Harris	Story by : Carol Evan McKeand and Larry Bischof; Teleplay by : Larry Bischof	October 3, 1974
When the class guinea pig dies in his care, Jim-Bob can't get anyone to listen to his distress, so he runs away. John-Boy misses a lecture by a famous travel writer to help look for him, but a chance encounter puts a positive spin on the day for them.
56	6	"The Romance"	Ivan Dixon	Hindi Brooks	October 10, 1974
John-Boy teaches Olivia to drive so she can fulfill a dream by taking an evening art class at college. She finds herself in a dilemma when young male teacher Joshua Williams (David Selby) becomes romantically attracted to her and makes advances during the class's field trip to a museum. He later comes to their home to apologize to her and John.
57	7	"The Ring"	Philip Leacock	Nigel McKeand	October 17, 1974
Mary Ellen is invited to a Boatwright dance by one of John-Boy's classmates. She buys a handbag from the local junk dealer and finds an amethyst ring inside it. Even though she knows who the handbag's owner is, she rationalizes borrowing the ring for the dance and returning it later. She loses the ring in the ladies' room at the dance. John-Boy's girlfriend helps her retrieve it at the cost of breaking university rules, which denies her eligibility in a prestigious sorority. Mary Ellen clears her conscience by returning the ring.
58	8	"The System"	Harry Harris	Jeb Rosebrook	October 24, 1974
John-Boy tutors Tom Povich (Richard Masur), a football player who wants to become a lawyer, for an important exam as he is at risk of failing history and losing his athletic scholarship. During the exam, John-Boy finds Tom in a moment of insecurity, glancing at his neighbor's test paper. The school's honor code and his good conscience demand that John-Boy, reluctantly, turn him in, but he successfully defends his friend against expulsion. Jason catches Ben smoking cigarettes and tells Grandpa, who sets out to teach Ben a lesson about the bad habit.
59	9	"The Spoilers"	Jack Shea	Caryl Ledner	October 31, 1974
After losing money in the financial crash, the well-to-do and snobby Hanover family from New York City move to Walton's Mountain to take over their abandoned ancestral home. John and Olivia try to teach the idealistic Mr. Hanover (Mark Miller) and his wife (Barbara Cason) farm living skills, but the spoiled and fresh children (Linda Purl and David Gruner) quickly make enemies with the Waltons and their friends. Before the family leaves, the daughter gives Mary Ellen a stylish, turbaned dress from Paris.
60	10	"The Marathon"	Ralph Senensky	Nigel McKeand	November 7, 1974
On a whim, John-Boy decides to enter a 7-day dance marathon after meeting Daisy (Deirdre Lenihan), a young woman who also enters. Olivia is angry about him entering such a grueling event but eventually comes to terms with the fact that he is becoming an adult, responsible for taking care of himself. John-Boy discovers how brutally the marathon organizers treat the dancers and how desperate Daisy is to win the prize money to leave Virginia for the big city. Halfway through, he finally decides to quit. Bernard Barrow appears as marathon emcee Harry Bracket.
61	11	"The Book"	Harry Harris	Joseph Bonaduce	November 14, 1974
John-Boy stretches himself academically by taking an advanced writing class but soon gets the feeling he's gotten himself in too deep. Meanwhile, his mother sees an advertisement for a publishing company looking for new authors and gives them a sample of his work. They send a letter offering to publish him, and he signs a contract over his father's warning. Since he is now a "published author," he gets a slightly swelled head in his writing class, and his professor sets up a radio interview in his class. John-Boy learns a hard lesson when he receives a bill for his delivered books; the company is a vanity press. He is ashamed but decides to share the lesson he's learned with the interviewer (Gerald McRaney). Jason's musical talents are discovered by the agent of Bobby Bigelow, a modestly famous Virginia native country singer, who hires him to play in his band.
62	12	"The Job"	Ivan Dixon	Nigel McKeand	November 21, 1974
John-Boy takes a part-time job reading to a blind woman named Ruth, a former Boatwright student. He has reservations about keeping it when he learns how bitter, closed, and afraid of the world she has become from her disability and her father’s recent death. When he can't take it anymore, he leaves in anger, causing Ruth to reconsider her attitude. She decides to accept his invitation to come to Walton's Mountain, and Olivia prepares a picnic at Drucilla's Pond. On the way home, Elizabeth foolishly walks on the bridge rail and falls onto the riverbank, knocking herself unconscious, and Ruth, all by herself, tries to rescue her. Ruth takes some training at an institute for the blind, returns to Boatwright, and becomes a state social worker.
63	13	"The Departure"	Ivan Dixon	Joanna Lee	December 5, 1974
It's John’s turn to become restless, deciding to take a job in a machine shop in Norfolk, 90 miles away, planning to return on weekends. This frustrates Olivia, and his absence is felt by the entire family, including John-Boy, who is encountering some academic problems at Boatwright. John finds he has to work overtime the first weekend and contend with a jealous, bitter worker and boarder named Stavros. When John-Boy drives to visit his father, John takes him to the local bar, where they end up in a fight with a stranger. John finally comes to his senses and returns home. Joanna Moore as the landlady Laura Sue Champion, Jack Garner as Johm-Boy's school counselor Mr. Gary
64	14	"The Visitor"	Ralph Waite	Kathleen Hite	December 12, 1974
A neighbor (John Beal) who moved away five years earlier returns to his abandoned house, saying his wife will be coming soon. The Walton women and a friend clean up the house in anticipation of her return. But then the man's son arrives with the news that his mother died two years ago, and his father has not accepted this. Also, Elizabeth has an imaginary friend.
65	15	"The Birthday"	Ivan Dixon	Nancy Greenwald	December 19, 1974
As his 73rd birthday nears, Grandpa has a heart attack. The family struggles to keep up his spirits, finally calling on his love for the mountain to help him recover. Against the hospital physician's advice, they insist on taking Grandpa home to recuperate in a bed under a canopy in the backyard, surrounded by plants and flowers, which proves therapeutic.
66	16	"The Lie"	Jack Shea	Hindi Brooks	January 2, 1975
Ben borrows John-Boy's car to take his girlfriend, Nancy, to a secret meeting with her mother, who left home several years ago. Nancy swears Ben to secrecy because she is afraid of her embittered father finding out. The good deed gets Ben into serious trouble when a joyrider temporarily steals the car and has a hit-and-run, and the victim records the license number. John-Boy pieces together what happened and convinces Ben to come clean. The girl tells her father about the meeting, and John makes him realize he was afraid of losing his daughter but that he has no need to fear her contact with her mother.
67	17	"The Matchmakers"	Jack Shea	John McGreevey	January 9, 1975
John's unmarried cousin Corabeth comes for an extended visit after her mother's death. The family introduces her to Ike, who likes her and decides he is tired of the bachelor life. He takes her, John, and Olivia to a first-class restaurant and proposes to Corabeth; she accepts, despite her reservations. Ike is enthusiastic about their future together, but Corabeth is prim and reserved. When they both have "cold feet," John and Olivia separately counsel and encourage them to proceed with the wedding. Reverend Fordwick marries them. Meanwhile, as the family's "middle girl," Erin feels neglected and unnoticed, so John-Boy treats her to a photographic portrait session.
68	18	"The Beguiled"	Ralph Senensky	Kathleen Hite	January 16, 1975
John-Boy is "beguiled" by Sis Branford (Darleen Carr), a rich, spoiled Boatwright student who almost has a traffic accident with him, ruining one of his tires. She also steals his chemistry notebook, which he desperately needs to pass an exam. She flirts and makes up with him, and he invites her home. She brings him a new tire but frames Jim-Bob's friend Danny Comley (Willie Aames) for the notebook theft. John-Boy realizes she's only been using him as a plaything, and he tells her off.
69	19	"The Caretakers"	Ivan Dixon	Richard Carr	January 23, 1975
Grandpa and Grandma feel cut off and disrespected by the family and decide to move away to be caretakers of another farmhouse. Without Grandpa, John is forced to hire a millhand, who proves clumsy and incompetent. After the grandparents encounter problems with the malfunctioning cookstove, radio, clock, sink, and lacking transportation, Grandpa finally swallows his pride. He agrees that they can move back, to the relief of the family.
70	20	"The Shivaree"	Lee Philips	Max Hodge	January 30, 1975
The family hosts the wedding of Olivia, the orphaned daughter of a friend, to Bob Hill (Bruce Davison), a city boy from Richmond. Ike and Yancy plan a shivaree, a Blue Ridge tradition based on an old French-Canadian hazing ritual where the groom is kidnapped and left in the woods on the wedding night. After John-Boy explains this to Bob, who has little sense of humor and wants nothing to do with it, he and his father leave a message for Ike and Yancy, who are off on a hunting trip, warning them to cancel the hazing, but they don't receive it and carry it out. Bob is so upset he tells his bride the wedding was a mistake, but the family fixes up the old cabin on top of the mountain as a honeymoon cottage, and he relents. Ike and Yancy cause some tension by showing up again, but they intend to serenade the young couple.
71	21	"The Choice"	Alf Kjellin	Nancy Greenwald	February 6, 1975
Believing the Depression will soon end, John and Zeb have plans to expand the lumber business into "Walton and Sons," depending on Jason to be a major partner. But Miss Hunter (Mariclare Costello) has been encouraging Jason to develop his musical talents with professional lessons and John-Boy to expand his writing skills by writing a novel. John-Boy is not sure he is ready to write a novel, but Jason gets a piano teacher, who advises him to apply for a scholarship at a music conservatory. Jason wants to be a composer like George Gershwin. John is firmly opposed, believing Jason won't be able to earn a living with music. When he finally changes his mind and wants his children to achieve their own life goals, John-Boy gets inspired to write the novel about his family.
72	22	"The Statue"	Ralph Waite	Story by : Sumner Long; Teleplay by : Earl Hamner	February 13, 1975
Grandpa wins first prize in the church raffle: a statue of a young woman, donated by the Baldwins. The statue is inspired by Edgar Allan Poe's poem Annabel Lee, but bears a resemblance to Grandpa's old girlfriend. Grandma recognizes it, which causes strife. Grandpa decides to use it to decorate his and Grandma's grave, but she says she'd rather be buried in the cow pasture, so Grandpa relents and has the children dump it in Drucilla's Pond. One of John-Boy's stories, a thinly veiled and somewhat unflattering portrayal of the Baldwins, has been accepted for publication. Still, he must decide if publishing it would be worth the hurt it would cause to Mamie and Emily.
73	23	"The Song"	Richard Thomas	Story by : Richard Carr; Teleplay by : Richard Carr and Armand Lanzano	February 20, 1975
Ben and Jason's relationship is strained when Ben suggests Jason hire a girl who Ben likes, Sally Ann (Erin Moran), to sing his new song with him in Bobby Bigelow's band. The plan backfires when Sally falls for Jason instead. Ben sulks and refuses to join the family at the performance but listens to it on the radio. Sally dedicates the song to Ben, and he comes to the performance to makeup with her hurriedly. The song, Will You Be Mine?, was written by Jon Walmsley (Jason). Meanwhile, John and Zeb join other local men for a wagered pool tournament at Ike's store to the disapproval of their wives.
74	24	"The Woman"	Harvey S. Laidman	Hindi Brooks	February 27, 1975
John and Olivia plan a repeat ceremony for their 20th wedding anniversary, and John buys Olivia a dress. The children paint a large picture of their house and family as a surprise to their parents. Meanwhile, at Boatwright, John-Boy is assigned to welcome and escort around a comely visiting poet, Madeline Bennett (Laura Campbell), whom he had long admired. He becomes giddy and infatuated, impulsively packs his bags, and almost accompanies her back on the train to New York, finally coming to his senses only as she boards the train.
75	25	"The Venture"	Ralph Waite	Joseph Bonaduce	March 6, 1975
Things are looking up on the mountain, and the Waltons take a $500 bank loan to buy faster mill equipment. When Grandpa and then John fall ill, the family faces missed deadlines and may lose their home. John-Boy pushes himself and everyone else too hard, trying to keep up. Eventually, he and Jason decide they must give up their dreams of college to work and help the family until the community comes to their aid.

=== Season 4 (1975–1976) ===
No. overall	No. in season	Title	Directed by	Written by	Original release date
76	1	"The Sermon"	Harry Harris	Kathleen Hite	September 11, 1975
John-Boy is coaxed into preaching a sermon while Reverend Fordwick is on his honeymoon. Meanwhile, Olivia teaches school for Mrs. Fordwick.
77	2	"The Genius"	Harry Harris	Robert Weverka	September 18, 1975
John-Boy brings his college friend Lyle (Dennis Kort), a nerdy 16-year-old genius, to visit and tutor him in physics. Lyle has no social skills or sense of humor, talks only in facts and figures, is an agnostic, and everyone dislikes him. He does, however, take an interest in Mary Ellen, who returns his interest by playfully squirting him with the garden hose. After Jason bows out of performing in a play at a fundraiser, Lyle fills in, and the family finally accepts him. His response of their acceptance is dousing Mary Ellen's head with water.
78	3	"The Fighter"	Ivan Dixon	Andy White	September 25, 1975
A black prize fighter from Richmond starts work at the Walton farm, hoping to get physical exercise. Olivia and Grandma strongly disapprove of his profession, until learning that he wants to earn money to start a church.
79	4	"The Prophecy"	Harry Harris	Marion Hargrove	October 2, 1975
John wrestles with feelings of failure as his high school reunion nears. At the reunion dinner held at their home, he finally realizes, however, that his classmates envy him for his loving wife and family. (Actress Lynn Carlin, Eulah Mae, appears in Seasons 5-6 as Sarah Griffith who marries Sheriff Bridges.
80	5	"The Boondoggle"	Ralph Waite	Claire Whitaker & Rod Peterson	October 9, 1975
A government writer (Richard McKenzie) comes to Walton's Mountain to write a Guide to Virginia. His meddling research uncovers dark secrets about Judge Baldwin's actions during the Civil War, which greatly upsets the sisters until they realize their father had acted out of humanitarian motives.
81	6	"The Breakdown"	Ivan Dixon	John McGreevey	October 16, 1975
Exhausted after trying to multi-task, Jason learns the hard way that you can't do everything you want to do at once. Meanwhile, John-Boy gets a job in the basement library at the college.
82	7	"The Wing-Walker"	Harvey S. Laidman	Andy White	October 23, 1975
John-Boy and Jim Bob vie for the attention of a daring lady wing walker (Lee Purcell). Tom Bower, who later becomes a recurring character as Mary Ellen's husband Dr. Curtis Willard, plays the pilot.
83	8	"The Competition"	Alf Kjellin	Story by : Nancy Greenwald; Teleplay by : Nancy Greenwald and Paul West	October 30, 1975
Mary Ellen and Erin fall in love with a forestry student staying and working at their house, who kisses Erin before deciding she is too young and he had better move on, breaking her heart. Olivia decides that she wants another child, but the doctor advises against another pregnancy. He arranges, however, for the family to care for an orphaned baby girl temporarily until the would-be adoptive parents are ready. Although Grandpa pretends to complain, the whole family enjoys the baby and regrets releasing her.
84	9	"The Emergence"	Alf Kjellin	Hindi Brooks	November 6, 1975
Marsha Wollery, one of John-Boy's high school flames, returns from Richmond. She plans to sell the family farm and give the money to her arrogant, greedy city fiancée. After she can’t sell it, the two break up, and John-Boy finds Marsha a better job. Olivia fills in as a substitute teacher and buys inexpensive eyeglasses for a neglected, older boy who badly needed them.
85	10	"The Loss"	Alf Kjellin	Joan Scott	November 13, 1975
Olivia's niece returns to Walton's Mountain after the recent death of her husband. She grieves continually until finding some relief helping with a litter of kittens.
86	11	"The Abdication"	Harvey S. Laidman	Story by : Paul West and Matt Robinson; Teleplay by : Matt Robinson	November 20, 1975
As the United Kingdom's King Edward VIII abdicates his throne, John-Boy's friend A.J. Covington (George Dzundza) returns to Walton's Mountain with a movie company, filming a movie he has written. A.J. has written a good story based on his experience on the Mountain but has a poor ear for dialects. His characters speak stereotypically, "hillbilly", which sets the onlookers laughing. John-Boy offers the director (James Karen) some suggestions on how to fix this, so the man asks him to rewrite the problem dialogue. The director (and the film's stars) are so impressed that he fires Covington and offers John-Boy a screenwriting job. John-Boy is upset that his friend was fired, so he "abdicates" the offer. Mary Ellen is romantically attracted to A.J.'s English assistant (Stephen Collins).
87	12	"The Estrangement"	Harry Harris	Michael Russnow & Tony Kayden	December 4, 1975
Young Wade (Richard Hatch) Walton's wife Vera and her baby return to Walton's Mountain, having run away from her unhappy marriage. She cites a drastic change in Wade's behavior since the government forced them off their property, which causes her to suspect Wade is cheating on her. He is transporting moonshine for his grandfather Boone and quits his other job in anger when his boss J. D. Paulsen (Burton Gilliam) speaks to him about his declining performance. After the sheriff arrests Wade, John-Boy persuades Boone to bail him out, and John offers him a new job making use of his woodworking skills; he comes to his senses and patches things up with his wife. Meanwhile, Ben starts a home business shipping individual pine seedlings but has to stop after the sheriff tells him the seedlings were all too immature to thrive, and he has no sales license.
88	13	"The Nurse"	Alf Kjellin	Kathleen Hite	December 11, 1975
Mary Ellen leaves home for the weekend to take her entrance exam for nursing school. Unfortunately, she finds she's not properly prepared. The county nurse offers to tutor her in the algebra and chemistry she needs to pass the test in exchange for caring for a sick mother and her children. In the process, Mary Ellen tenderly breaks the news of her mother's death to her little daughter.
89	14	"The Intruders"	Richard C. Bennett	Seth Freeman	December 18, 1975
Walton's Mountain isn't big enough for two sawmills! A rival sawmill, Murdock's, comes to town and bets John they can fill an order faster than the Waltons. Ben runs away from home and is discovered working for the rival, not realizing he is undermining his father's business. Grandpa makes up for this by cleverly tricking the Murdocks into thinking they can float their logs downriver on a raft, causing them to get stuck on a sandbar and lose the bet.
90	15	"The Search"	Harry Harris	Story by : Ellen Corby; Teleplay by : Paul West	January 1, 1976
Olivia, Jim Bob and Elizabeth are stranded in the middle of the woods, with a storm brewing, after having a flat tire, and chasing after a hen. Searching for help, they encounter a cabin of hostile bootleggers.
91	16	"The Secret"	Harvey S. Laidman	Claire Whitaker & Rod Peterson	January 8, 1976
Jim Bob can't find his birth record on file, and suspects he may have been adopted. On further investigation, he learns he had a twin brother who died at birth. John-Boy, although overwhelmed with college assignments, feels obligated to write local history articles for Mrs. Breckenridge of the historical society, who had given Jason a music scholarship.
92	17	"The Fox"	Richard Thomas	Max Hodge	January 15, 1976
Ben plans on going into the fur business when a fox starts nosing around the farm. Meanwhile, Grandpa doesn't seem to want to go to the Spanish–American War veterans' reunion, even though he talks so much about his charge up San Juan Hill.
93	18	"The Burn Out"	Harry Harris	John McGreevey	January 22, 1976
94	19	"The Burn Out"	Harry Harris	John McGreevey	January 22, 1976
A fire severely damages the 2nd floor and kitchen of the Walton house. Having taken up smoking, John-Boy fears he may have started it by leaving a lit pipe, but the cause is a space heater Grandpa forgot to turn off. As John, Grandpa, and John-Boy make repairs, the family must parcel the younger children to friends and neighbors. John-Boy finally can restart the manuscript of his novel, which was destroyed in the fire. Ben moves into Yancy Tucker's cabin, oversleeps, and goes fishing with Yancy rather than school. Grandma and Grandpa stayed at a boarding house whose women enjoyed Grandpa's storytelling. A traumatized Elizabeth doesn't want to return home from the Godseys. Actress Pearl Shear makes her first appearance as Zuleika Dunbar.
95	20	"The Big Brother"	Ralph Waite	John McGreevey	January 29, 1976
Runaway girl Muffin Maloni (Vicki Schreck) gets the attention of most of the Walton family who collects money for her bus travel home, the exception being Grandpa, who knows a con artist when he sees one.
96	21	"The Test"	Harvey S. Laidman	Kathleen Hite	February 5, 1976
Maude, who gave her goat to the Waltons, doesn't adapt well to her strict confinement in the retirement home, while Olivia gets a job as a seamstress in a high-end fashion store. Olivia resigns after the store owner (Abby Dalton) wants her to take on management responsibility and travel extensively.
97	22	"The Quilting"	Lawrence Dobkin	Claire Whitaker & Rod Peterson	February 12, 1976
Mary Ellen refuses to follow the country tradition of making a quilt to announce her eligibility to date boys, and Grandma doesn't like her attitude. John-Boy finally persuades Mary Ellen to go along.
98	23	"The House"	Harvey S. Laidman	Kirby Timmons	February 19, 1976
Grandma begins a petition to save the old Whitley house, while the county has contracted Grandpa to tear the house down before any children are hurt playing in it. John-Boy, as editor, writes to suggest that people salvage parts out of the house. Jason plays piano in a music recital.
99	24	"The Fledgling"	Harry Harris	Earl Hamner	February 26, 1976
John-Boy is offered an amazing printing press for a good price by a retiring newsman. Despite being a college student, he gets a full-time job to pay for the press and a boarding house room near his college. After a while, he begins to realize that he's working too hard.
100	25	"The Collision"	Richard Thomas	John McGreevey	March 4, 1976
John-Boy meets with the wealthy Selina again when she comes home from Vassar College. Her enthusiasm for the War in Spain and those reporting on the conflict cause John-Boy to struggle to decide where he belongs: Walton's Mountain or Spain. As he tries to define courage, Selina's family's financial problems come to light, causing a change in her plans. Meanwhile, Elizabeth is jealous of another schoolgirl who has fancier possessions. Eduard Franz appears as Selina's grandfather.

=== Season 5 (1976–1977) ===
No. overall	No. in season	Title	Directed by	Written by	Original release date
101	1	"The First Edition"	Lawrence Dobkin	John McGreevey	September 23, 1976
The Blue Ridge Chronicle (John-Boy's new newspaper) is open for business! The problem is the paper embarrasses the family, as it reports Ben and his friends were caught breaking into a house. Meanwhile, Corabeth realizes she had had a "false pregnancy" and, believing she is barren and has disappointed Ike, almost deserts him.
102	2	"The Vigil"	Harry Harris	Kathleen Hite	September 30, 1976
Grandma's struck ill, so Mary Ellen, trying to prove herself as a nurse, treats her for influenza. But it turns out the illness is different—and life-threatening. Mary Ellen feels guilty over her misdiagnosis.
103	3	"The Comeback"	Harvey S. Laidman	Seth Freeman	October 7, 1976
Jason becomes the new piano man at the Dew Drop Inn, much to the chagrin of Olivia and Grandma, who disapprove of drinking. He persuades a former bandleader named Red (Merle Haggard), who had been sequestered after the death of his son Seth (Ron Howard in a previous episode), to return to the stage. Meanwhile, Yancy loves Cissy but is uneasy at the thought of marriage, so Cissy pretends interest in John-Boy to get him to propose.
104	4	"The Baptism"	Ralph Waite	Andy White	October 14, 1976
A famous revival preacher (John Karlen) is coming to town, and Esther and Olivia hope that John and Ben will be converted and baptized. John is almost struck by lightning, which some see as an omen. A peacock wanders onto the home and is adopted by Jim-Bob, who names him Rover.
105	5	"The Fire Storm"	Ralph Senensky	Claire Whitaker & Rod Peterson	October 21, 1976
John-Boy's attempts at keeping Walton's Mountain residents up to date with current events don't work out, especially after his highly controversial attempt to copy excerpts of Mein Kampf in his newspaper. Erin enters a beauty contest.
106	6	"The Nightwalker"	Harvey S. Laidman	Paul West	October 28, 1976
A mysterious being stalks Walton's Mountain, seeming to spy on people. Jason books his band to play in Ike's new dance hall, but people are afraid to come. The prowler is finally found to be Lorin Hadley (Gary Tomlin), the mute son of a new neighbor, Eva Hadley (Peggy Webber).
107	7	"The Wedding"	Lawrence Dobkin	Claire Whitaker & Rod Peterson	November 4, 1976
108	8	"The Wedding"	Lawrence Dobkin	Claire Whitaker & Rod Peterson	November 4, 1976
Mary Ellen surprises everyone by announcing her engagement to hospital intern David Spencer. Meanwhile, a new doctor, Curtis Willard (Tom Bower), arrives to practice in the community, though he and Mary Ellen don't get along. He dislikes her attempts to reorganize his office, and she feels he talks too bluntly to patients. But she comes to decide she doesn't love David, and her love-hate relationship with Curtis ends in marriage after he returns from testifying in the capital about mine safety conditions.
109	9	"The Cloudburst"	Harry Harris	Paul Cooper	November 11, 1976
John-Boy sells most of his meadow to pay off his printing press so he can continue the Blue Ridge Chronicle, deeply upsetting Grandpa. He is then alarmed to learn the land company plans to buy up more small plots to do hydraulic gold mining in the community. After fainting while watching Curt perform an emergency tracheotomy, Mary Ellen is later encouraged when she successfully delivers Mrs. Fordwick's baby.
110	10	"The Great Motorcycle Race"	Richard Thomas	John Joseph	November 18, 1976
Jim-Bob, though inexperienced, uses Ike's motorcycle to enter a local bike race, to Olivia's alarm. Meanwhile, Ike and Corabeth go to the adoption agency to bring home a baby boy but return instead with 10-year-old Aimee. Corabeth worries when Aimee does not immediately bond with them, but she finally shows affection.
111	11	"The Pony Cart"	Ralph Senensky	Jack Miller	December 2, 1976
The irascible Martha Corrine Walton, in her 90s, makes an unexpected return to Walton's Mountain and reminisces about her early life as a Civil War veteran’s bride. She soon gets on everyone's nerves as she adds her methods to the cooking and her opinions in the family's life. Ben buys a used pony cart, intending to resell it for a profit after making some improvements. Martha Corrine calls it a "shay,” paints flowers on the side, and Ben takes the cart to her to visit her husband's grave; she has a heart attack. Veteran actress Beulah Bondi won an Emmy for Lead Actress in a Single Performance for her guest appearance.
112	12	"The Best Christmas"	Lawrence Dobkin	John McGreevey	December 9, 1976
Olivia sets about making this Christmas 'the best we ever had', but a variety of emergencies keep each of the Walton children from coming home.
113	13	"The Last Mustang"	Walter Alzmann	Calvin Clements, Jr.	December 16, 1976
John-Boy, as a newspaper editor, gets tangled up in the coming sheriff's election, in which a handsome, polished stranger (John Fink) runs against the incumbent, down-to-earth Ep Bridges. When John-Boy refuses to endorse the new candidate, his staff threatens to retaliate by undermining the Waltons' lumber business. Meanwhile, Grandpa tries to help 'The Last Mustang' after being captured and breaks free again.
114	14	"The Rebellion"	Harvey S. Laidman	Kathleen Hite	December 23, 1976
Olivia, yearning for change, contemplates cutting her hair. When John protests, she decides on a perm from Corabeth, which is disastrous and ridiculed. Grandma, happy with things the way they are, threatens to become a Methodist when the preacher asks her to share organ duties with Zelda Maynard (Audrey Christie), one of her fiercest rivals. Grandpa lands in hot water when he tries to mediate the dispute.
115	15	"The Ferris Wheel"	Lawrence Dobkin	Claire Whitaker & Rod Peterson	January 6, 1977
Nightmares get the better of Elizabeth, who dreams she is trapped at the top of a carnival Ferris wheel. She discovers she has been suppressing a traumatic memory. Meanwhile, Ben is concerned that he is not growing taller.
116	16	"The Elopement"	Harry Harris	Hindi Brooks	January 13, 1977
Chad Marshall returns to Walton's Mountain and proposes to Erin. They flee at night to awaken a Justice of the Peace, but she changes her mind just before reciting the vows, and her parents arrive in a panic. The Walton children, minding Ike's store, inadvertently extend credit to Maude Gormley. When John-Boy visits Maude about her store debt, he discovers she paints beautiful bird pictures.
117	17	"John's Crossroad"	Richard Thomas	Andy White and Paul West	January 20, 1977
John gets a job in Charlottesville, working in a stuffy, state government office for a tyrannical, controlling boss who is feared by his staff. They sometimes must stay overtime. Despite the money, John realizes the job is not for him and quits.
118	18	"The Career Girl"	Harry Harris	Kathleen Hite	January 27, 1977
Erin has graduated from high school; now, she must decide where her future lies. She works as a switchboard operator, briefly as a waitress in a roadhouse, and buys John-Boy a typewriter. Family members sneak a look at John-Boy's novel about them and the community.
119	19	"The Hero"	Anthony Brand	Kathleen Hite	February 3, 1977
Honor Day reveals that Sheriff Ep Bridges had won medals for bravery in World War I. John-Boy locates Sara Griffith (Lynn Carlin), a wartime ambulance driver who had been Ep's first love, and brings her to the community's Memorial Day ceremony.
120	20	"The Inferno"	Harry Harris	Claire Whitaker & Rod Peterson	February 10, 1977
John-Boy wins $25 from a journalism contest and an all-expense-paid trip to cover the Hindenburg landing in Lakehurst, New Jersey. After witnessing the airship burst into flames, he returns home traumatized and unable to write about it. Meanwhile, Curt and Mary Ellen are frustrated at not having private time from the family.
121	21	"The Heartbreaker"	Ralph Waite	Seth Freeman	February 17, 1977
Jason falls deeply in love with Curt's young sister (Linda Purl), who joins their band as a singer and flirts with and admires him. He doesn't realize she takes relationships lightly, and soon dumps him for another band member.
122	22	"The Long Night"	Harry Harris	Story by : Katharyn Michaelian Powers and Claire Whitaker & Rod Peterson; Teleplay by : Claire Whitaker & Rod Peterson	February 24, 1977
Grandpa tries to sneak into Esther's hospital room with flowers but is rebuffed and told that she needs rest. He feels down until he discovers Aimee needs a grandfather. She had been frustrated at Corabeth's emphasis on highbrow culture instead of letting her play and wander with Elizabeth outdoors.
123	23	"The Hiding Place"	Walter Alzmann	John McGreevey	March 3, 1977
The Baldwins' cousin Hilary Von Kleist (Jean Marsh) has come home after 17 years as a German diplomat's wife in Europe. Because she keeps avoiding John-Boy's questions about current events in Germany, John-Boy thinks she's hiding something. After staying confined in bed with worry, she finally opens up about her disagreement with the Nazi regime. Meanwhile, Jason joins the National Guard, against his mother's wishes.
124	24	"The Go-Getter"	Lawrence Dobkin	Andy White and Paul West	March 10, 1977
Ben becomes a used car salesman, smooth-talking customers to buy old clunkers, acting cocky, and making fun of Jim Bob's jalopy. Melody Thomas Scott guest stars as Darlene Jarvis, the daughter of Jim Bob's boss. Sheriff Bridges takes his date to a movie and dinner at the Waltons, then they set off to marry, to everyone's delight.
125	25	"The Achievement"	Harry Harris	Dale Eunson and Andy White	March 17, 1977
John-Boy is worried after a New York City publishing company has kept his manuscript for six weeks with no reply. He goes there to discover it lying in a stack waiting to be read. He meets with the publisher, a sympathetic woman who agrees to read his novel immediately. He also meets his friend Daisy, who now works as a taxi dancer in a New York City ballroom; they flirt, and she lends him a little money. While John-Boy reports this good news to his family, Mary Ellen and Curt also have news of their own; she is pregnant.

=== Season 6 (1977–1978) ===
No. overall	No. in season	Title	Directed by	Written by	Original release date
126	1	"The Hawk"	Anthony Brand	Andy White	September 15, 1977
Grandpa and Jim Bob try to trap a hawk who's been terrorizing the Waltons' chickens; while Erin and Corabeth are attracted to the community's new preacher (Peter Fox), causing gossip.
127	2	"The Stray"	Harry Harris	Kathleen Hite	September 22, 1977
Young black boy Josh (Todd Bridges) is found in the Walton barn. Not knowing where he came from or who his parents are, the Waltons take him in. He is found to have traveled from North Carolina, and he tries to help with chores and catching fish. Although he begs to be adopted by the Waltons, Verdie and Harley decide it is more acceptable to adopt him instead. Ketty Lester has a cameo as Mrs. Thomas, who runs an orphanage.
128	3	"The Recluse"	Walter Alzmann	Seth Freeman	September 29, 1977
Ben leaves home to work at a Norfolk defense factory. Tensions run high between Grandpa and John as they take on a big furniture contract without him. Grandpa and Ben visit a Norfolk restaurant with hula dancers. Meanwhile, Jason makes friends with a reclusive woman (Linda Marsh) and leads her out of depression back into the world.
129	4	"The Warrior"	Ralph Senensky	Joan Scott	October 13, 1977
A Cherokee Indian (Jerado Decordovier) and his grandson come to stay with the Waltons. The man claims a sacred tribal burial ground is beneath the Walton barn, which he tries to burn down at night to "purify" the ground.
130	5	"The Seashore"	Lawrence Dobkin	Marion Hargrove	October 20, 1977
Contracted to fix the Baldwin sisters' beach cottage, John will be gone for at least a week, so Olivia decides the family needs a vacation. The Waltons find an English girl (Vickery Turner) squatting in the cottage, which seems to be hiding a secret; a suspicious Coast Guard questions her and Jason. Meanwhile, Ben is home doing all the family chores and frustrated that he doesn't have time alone with his girlfriend.
131	6	"The Volunteer"	Philip Leacock	Kathleen Hite	October 27, 1977
When Erin declines G. W. Haines's (David Doremus) marriage proposal, he decides to join the U.S. Army. The Walton parents reluctantly let Erin visit G. W. at his Army camp, where he makes unwanted advances to her. Maude Gormley (Merie Earle) sells her first painting at Ike's store and offers more paintings for sale through an art dealer.
132	7	"The Grandchild"	Ralph Senensky	Claire Whitaker & Rod Peterson	November 3, 1977
133	8	"The Grandchild"	Ralph Senensky	Claire Whitaker & Rod Peterson	November 3, 1977
Mary Ellen is taken to the hospital with only false labor, and the family and neighbors are relieved when she finally delivers John Curtis days later. She had been scared to death of omens after encountering a superstitious woman (Beth Raines). The woman, who'd recently had a stillborn, kidnaps John Curtis out of jealousy. Meanwhile, a fire at the Dew Drop Inn leaves Jason jobless. He finds a piano job at a Charlottesville burlesque house, whose show Grandpa, Ben, and Jim Bob see. Jason later settles for a gospel band instead, to his mother's relief.
134	9	"The First Casualty"	Harry Harris	Andy White	November 10, 1977
Curt is called into the U.S. Army Medical Corps, then Walton's Mountain receives its first war casualty as G.W. is killed in a training exercise. Yancy hastily marries Sissy (Cissy Wellman) and then goes to enlist in the service, but is not accepted. Sissy tries to decorate and adapt to Yancy's rustic home and his animals.
135	10	"The Battle of Drucilla's Pond"	Philip Leacock	Claire Whitaker & Rod Peterson	November 17, 1977
U.S. soldiers begin staging war games at Drucilla's Pond, killing fish and scaring the Waltons' cow into giving birth. Olivia enters her scenic paintings in a local art show, after which Grandpa secretly buys them back to keep.
136	11	"The Flight"	Ralph Waite	Michael Raschella & Carole Raschella	December 1, 1977
Jim-Bob becomes friends with a boy who says he's joining the Air Corps, but it turns out he ran away from an orphanage to retrieve his young sister who was placed in a different facility. Maude Gormley takes Elizabeth's goat, hoping that Elizabeth will visit her.
137	12	"The Milestone"	Philip Leacock	Kathleen Hite	December 8, 1977
Olivia suddenly becomes emotionally fragile and runs away, going to her Aunt Kate (Louise Latham) in her birth town for help.
138	13	"The Children's Carol"	Lawrence Dobkin	John McGreevey	December 15, 1977
139	14	"The Children's Carol"	Lawrence Dobkin	John McGreevey	December 15, 1977
Two British children escape the London Blitz to find safety in Walton's Mountain with the Baldwins and the Waltons for Christmas. Meanwhile, Jason contemplates whether he can fight in the impending war, and Olivia has a faith crisis as she can't understand how God could allow war.
140	15	"The Celebration"	Gwen Arner	Marion Hargrove	December 22, 1977
The Waltons are excited to learn that John will own the mill after two more payments and be completely clear of debt. However, Ike has a financial emergency when he cannot sell a large supply of refrigerators, so John agrees to lend Ike the money so his store will not be foreclosed. The ladies conspire to find a match for Reverend Buchanan; he shocks them by dating Marsha Woolery.
141	16	"The Rumor"	Ralph Waite	Kathleen Hite	January 5, 1978
Flossie Brimmer's brother-in-law Willie (Mathew Anden) and his family relocate from Germantown, Pennsylvania, to Walton's Mountain. A neighbor circulates a rumor that they are German spies, especially after they show interest in Jim Bob's short-wave radio. John defends the innocent man and hires him at his mill. The neighbors are finally convinced of the family's innocence after a suspicious package the family receives at Ike's post office turns out to be only medicine.
142	17	"Spring Fever"	Richard Chaffee	Claire Whitaker & Rod Peterson	January 12, 1978
Ben and Jim Bob begin to act hostile toward each other, culminating in them competing to date each other's girlfriends. The family repaints the house.
143	18	"The Festival"	Gwen Arner	Michael McGreevey	January 26, 1978
Jason and Josh become a great musical team, but some doors are closed to them because Josh is black. After they are excluded from the nearby town's festival, the boys' adoptive father, Harley, counsels them bitterly not to trust white people. However, Jason and Josh organize their talent show instead.
144	19	"The Anniversary"	Walter Alzmann	Claire Whitaker & Rod Peterson	February 2, 1978
John and Olivia's 25th anniversary brings many surprises: the children do too well organizing a private party, Olivia arranges for the installation of their first phone, and John builds her a romantic gazebo. At work, Mary Ellen reunites with the ex-fiancé she jilted to marry Curt, while her absent Army husband is attracted to a lovely nurse. Curt surprises them all by coming home on a weekend pass, and the party turns into a late-night picnic on Walton's Mountain.
145	20	"The Family Tree"	Lawrence Dobkin	Teleplay by : Thomas Hood; Story by : Joyce Perry & Thomas Hood	February 9, 1978
Elizabeth becomes pen pals with a soldier. The only problem: she says she's 18 and sends him a picture of Erin, saying it's her. Meanwhile, Jason takes Verdie to a farmhouse to find information about her ancestors who had been enslaved there, but they are rebuffed by the bitter widow who refuses them access to papers in her attic. Grandpa convinces the owner to allow them into the attic, where they find items of great interest.
146	21	"The Ordeal"	Lawrence Dobkin	Paul West	February 16, 1978
147	22	"The Ordeal"	Lawrence Dobkin	Paul West	February 16, 1978
Due to Jim Bob and Ben's negligence, Elizabeth has a bad accident, tumbling off a stack of loose logs she has climbed on to reach a bird's nest. The family must help keep Elizabeth's determination high when the doctor is unsure whether she will walk again. Erin minds the house while Olivia stays with Elizabeth. After a hospital stay, she is sent home wearing leg braces. Virginia Gregg appears as self-professed "healer" Ada Corley.
148	23	"The Return"	Harry Harris	Kathleen Hite	March 16, 1978
149	24	"The Return"	Harry Harris	Kathleen Hite	March 16, 1978
John-Boy returns to Walton's Mountain on assignment to write a news story after receiving a letter from Olivia saying that hard times have hit Jefferson County and jobs are scarce. John-Boy decides to reopen the Guthrie coal mine to create more jobs; his family will begin by doing carpentry to shore up the mine shaft. But when John, Jason, Ben, Jim-Bob, Harley, and Ike are trapped in a cave-in, John-Boy seems to be the one to blame.
150	25	"The Revelation"	Gwen Arner	D.C. Fontana & Richard Fontana	March 23, 1978
John-Boy proposes to Daisy in New York City, and she accepts, so they return to Walton's Mountain to make preparations. However, a wartime assignment for John-Boy in London and a secret about Daisy's past cut their plans short. It is revealed that she has a young daughter, born out of wedlock and raised by Daisy's mother in Lynchburg. Elizabeth and her friend George open up a lemonade stand, and Grandpa spikes their product with the Baldwin Sisters' "recipe."
151	26	"Grandma Comes Home"	Ralph Senensky	Claire Whitaker & Rod Peterson	March 30, 1978
Grandma, barely able to speak, finally returns home after being in the hospital for over a year. Grandpa is thrilled but thinks there is something wrong with his "old woman." A boy gives Elizabeth a piglet for her 4-H project, but it keeps running away.

=== Season 7 (1978–1979) ===
No. overall	No. in season	Title	Directed by	Written by	Original release date
152	1	"The Empty Nest"	Philip Leacock	Claire Whitaker & Rod Peterson	September 21, 1978
153	2	"The Empty Nest"	Philip Leacock	Claire Whitaker & Rod Peterson	September 21, 1978
After Grandpa's death, John struggles to handle a busy lumber contract alone and takes out a bank loan. Erin, Mary Ellen, and John Curtis move to a Charlottesville apartment but then return home. John goes to Richmond to see a wealthy lumber contractor, who is at first cold and evasive but then hosts John and Olivia to dinner and offers him an important position as head of procurement that would require the family to move there. Mr. Murdock persuades John instead to stay on the mountain and form a joint lumber enterprise with him to meet the Army's growing needs. Ben experiences problems when he takes over John's order in his absence. Jim-Bob purchases and repairs an old jukebox. Zuleika Dunbar (Pearl Shear) purchases the old boarding house, which had been closed since Flossie Brimmer died.
154	3	"The Calling"	Gwen Arner	Kathleen Hite	September 28, 1978
Jim-Bob falls for the Baldwins' pretty visiting Catholic cousin (Stacey Nelkin), enjoying time with her outdoors, before she breaks his heart by joining a convent. Nuns Sister Theresa (Mitzi Hoag) and Sister Scolastica (Jeanette Nolan) visit the community, shocking bigoted Corabeth. Meanwhile, Ben hires a man at the mill, not realizing that, although friendly, he's a drunkard, sloppy and unreliable; John orders Ben to fire him.
155	4	"The Moonshiner"	Lawrence Dobkin	Jeb Rosebrook	October 12, 1978
Boone Walton, finally caught running his moonshine business, is convicted to jail. Jason offers to pay the fine and take Boone into his custody, hoping to reform him. Boone helps the Baldwins who have misplaced their father's recipe, and can't stay dry and runs off. John-Boy's former fiancée, Daisy, and her child visit en route to New York City.
156	5	"The Obsession"	Gwen Arner	Juliet Packer	October 19, 1978
Mary Ellen becomes dependent on amphetamines to keep her going during the stressful time leading up to her nursing exams, but struggles to resist further pills. Meanwhile, Cissy (Cissy Wellman) walks out on Yancy, tired of their dirty home and the animals in the house, and starts to file for divorce. Elizabeth attempts to reunite the couple.
157	6	"The Changeling"	Lawrence Dobkin	Robert Pirosh	October 26, 1978
Strange happenings coincide with Elizabeth's approaching 13th birthday. Meanwhile, Jason becomes the host of a new radio show, giving relationship advice.
158	7	"The Portrait"	Ralph Senensky	John Dunkel	November 2, 1978
Erin wrestles with feelings of love and fear toward an artist (Jared Martin) who has devastating memories of German-occupied Paris and who attempts to paint her in a mural. Meanwhile, Jim-Bob and Elizabeth buy a canary for Grandma but can't get him to sing.
159	8	"The Captive"	Ralph Waite	Ray Cunneff	November 9, 1978
Corabeth, going through a midlife crisis, tries numerous failed business endeavors such as a dance studio, all the while seeking refuge in alcohol. Meanwhile, Jim-Bob tries to teach Elizabeth to drive.
160	9	"The Illusion"	Walter Alzmann	John McGreevey	November 16, 1978
Verdie's business-educated daughter, Esther (Joan Pringle), comes home from New York City and stirs up controversy with her revolutionary ideas about a black woman's place in society. Erin fights to get J.D. Pickett (Lewis Arquette) to hire Esther as personnel manager at his inefficient production plant.
161	10	"The Beau"	Gwen Arner	D.C. Fontana & Richard Fontana	November 23, 1978
One of Grandma's old beaus (Arthur Space), a widower from Richmond, comes to visit and bonds with her, taking her on several dates. Meanwhile, Jim-Bob and Yancy distill alcohol strong enough to run their cars on after gas is rationed. Corabeth adds stylish hats to the store inventory.
162	11	"Day of Infamy"	Harry Harris	Paul Savage	December 7, 1978
Just as Mary Ellen prepares to join Curt in Hawaii, the attack on Pearl Harbor occurs, forcing the U.S. into World War II and leaving Mary Ellen and Verdie concerned for their loved ones stationed there. Meanwhile, Ben takes out a girl nicknamed "Sinful Cindy" (Robin Eisenman), whom Olivia does not approve of. (This episode first aired on Pearl Harbor Day, 1978.)
163	12	"The Yearning"	Nell Cox	Juliet Packer	December 14, 1978
Elizabeth has a crush on the new minister, who rooms with the family while skunk odor is removed from his home. Meanwhile, Erin helps the Baldwins write a book from their father's journals, and they are astonished to find that he had hidden a letter from Ashley Longworth to Emily.
164	13	"The Boosters"	Harry Harris	Robert Pirosh	December 28, 1978
Wanting to make a profit off of the now heavy traffic near Walton's Mountain, Ben, Ike, and Corabeth decide to build an auto court and landscaped town square. They mistakenly believe a busy factory is coming. Yancey studies barbering, practicing on his reluctant neighbors.
165	14	"The Conscience"	Gwen Arner	Michael McGreevey	January 4, 1979
Trouble breaks out in the community and the family when Jason considers signing up as a conscientious objector. Jim-Bob can't wait to join the Air Corps, however, and gets a tattoo.
166	15	"The Obstacle"	William H. Bushnell	Curtis Dwight	January 11, 1979
John-Boy's old college roommate Mike Paxton (Dennis Redfield) stays with the Waltons after he is injured when his ship is torpedoed by a German U-boat. Meanwhile, Ike and Ben perform a song-and-dance routine to audition for the USO.
167	16	"The Parting"	Harry Harris	Kathleen Hite	January 18, 1979
Olivia receives unwelcome news from the doctor. Meanwhile, Elizabeth is making a family cookbook and discovers a surprise ingredient in Grandma's sponge cake. Also, Jim-Bob drives the family crazy by taking up the accordion.
168	17	"The Burden"	Harry Harris	E.F. Wallengren	January 25, 1979
With Olivia away, Jim-Bob runs wild carousing until a near-death experience convinces him it's a sign from God to join the ministry. He continually quotes Bible verses until realizing that ordination requires years of training. Meanwhile, Elizabeth bothers the family with her bug collecting.
169	18	"The Pin-Up"	Larry Stewart	Juliet Packer	February 8, 1979
Ben begins dabbling in photography and jokingly takes a revealing picture of Erin, which quickly becomes the popular pin-up at Camp Lee. Though Erin enjoys the fan mail, John strongly disapproves. Meanwhile, Mary Ellen becomes overly protective of John Curtis and neglects her nursing career.
170	19	"The Attack"	Harry Harris	E.F. Wallengren	February 15, 1979
With the stress of the price freeze, food rationing, and extra business, Ike suffers a heart attack, and Corabeth blames herself. The Walton children offer to run the store while he recovers. Meanwhile, Ben and Jim-Bob enter the molasses business to resolve the sugar shortage.
171	20	"The Legacy"	Gwen Arner	Story by : Michael Learned; Teleplay by : William Parker	February 22, 1979
Emily's memories of Ashley Longworth are stirred up when his handsome son, Ashley Jr. (Jonathan Frakes), arrives on leave from the Navy with news of his father. A confused Miss Emily thinks he is her Ashley returning to her, which causes problems for Erin, who also falls for him. Elizabeth has her problems with just growing up.
172	21	"The Outsider"	Philip Leacock	Robert Pirosh	March 1, 1979
The family is shocked when Ben returns from a trip with a wife, Cindy. The young couple takes up residence in the shed next to the house and has petty disagreements until the others convince Ben he is bossing her and should back off. Ike buys Corabeth a decorative outdoor fountain.
173	22	"The Torch"	David F. Wheeler	Rod Peterson	March 8, 1979
John's old high school flame (Dorothy Tristan) buys and operates the Dew Drop Inn, while Elizabeth, Erin, and Cindy attempt to open a canteen for the soldiers on leave from the camp at Rockfish.
174	23	"The Tailspin"	Walter Alzmann	Claire Whitaker	March 15, 1979
Jim-Bob's sky-high dreams of becoming a pilot crash and burn when his eyesight isn't 20/20. Corabeth tries to tutor him in classic literature. He gets prescription glasses but will not wear them. He finally leaves to enlist in the Army, but stays to study aircraft mechanics. Meanwhile, a friend of Curt's (Kevin Geer) from his hometown, stationed nearby, visits, and after hesitation, Mary Ellen joins him on a date.
175	24	"Founder's Day"	Ralph Waite	Kathleen Hite	March 22, 1979
The Waltons, Godseys, and Baldwins compete to see who the founding family of Walton's Mountain is. Jason's strict music professor (Dean Jagger) criticizes his new composition until he hears Jason play it on Founders Day.

=== Season 8 (1979–1980) ===
No. overall	No. in season	Title	Directed by	Written by	Original release date
176	1	"The Home Front"	Harry Harris	Claire Whitaker & Rod Peterson	September 20, 1979
177	2	"The Home Front"	Harry Harris	Claire Whitaker & Rod Peterson	September 20, 1979
John becomes the local draft-board director and must deal with a furious father (George DiCenzo) when his son, whom John drafted, dies on his troop transport headed for Europe. He has his own feelings of loss when he receives a telegram stating John-Boy is MIA. Meanwhile, Erin tries to get a raise from J.D. Pickett
178	3	"The Kinfolk"	Philip Leacock	E.F. Wallengren	September 27, 1979
Olivia's aunt Rose (Peggy Rea) and her two mischievous grandchildren, Jeffrey (Keith Coogan) and Serena (Martha Nix Wade), arrive at the Waltons. The children repeatedly cause trouble, including shoplifting, driving a car into a fence, and starting a brush fire. Ike and Jim-Bob build an air-raid siren, which Jeffrey accidentally sets off.
179	4	"The Diploma"	Gwen Arner	Kathleen Hite	October 4, 1979
John discovers he never received his high-school diploma because he enlisted for WWI before he graduated. The Army refuses to do business with him if he can’t produce it, so he must take an equivalency exam. Mary Ellen takes over for the county nurse who has joined the army, and she must earn the trust of the skeptical backwoods people (Lane Bradbury and Les Lannom) who refuse her help for their ill children.
180	5	"The Innocents"	Gwen Arner	Juliet Packer	October 11, 1979
Olivia creates a daycare facility for the children whose mothers are working at J. D. Pickett's. Ike takes dancing lessons from Rose, but Corabeth suspects he is having an affair.
181	6	"The Starlet"	Philip Leacock	D.C. Fontana & Richard Fontana	October 18, 1979
A Hollywood director (Henry Darrow) shooting a war film at Pickett's tells Erin she could have a career in the movies. She and Mary Ellen decide to move to California after realizing the defense plants pay more. But Mr. Pickett and the family are relieved when they realize the movie director was only flattering Erin. The Baldwins organize a party for soldiers at their home but are disappointed when no one comes, so Jason takes drastic action.
182	7	"The Journal"	Philip Leacock	Robert Pirosh	October 25, 1979
With John-Boy still MIA, the manuscript he wrote is waiting to be published, so John and Olivia must sign in his absence and they try to locate him through the Red Cross. The family dog Reckless, whom Jeffrey has become attached to, dies of old age while romping through the woods with him.
183	8	"The Lost Sheep"	Walter Alzmann	E.F. Wallengren	November 1, 1979
After experiencing combat, Ashley Longworth Jr. (Jonathan Frakes) visits on leave and proposes that he and Erin marry immediately. But, she has difficulty adjusting to the loss of his faith and the changes in his behavior. Meanwhile, Serena becomes Elizabeth's shadow.
184	9	"The Violated"	Walter Alzmann	Robert Pirosh	November 8, 1979
Olivia is shocked when she discovers why Darcy Thatcher (Antoinette Stella), wife of Frank Thatcher (Kelly Ward), is no longer responding to his letters. Corabeth receives a large inheritance, buys a luxury car, and talks of retiring. The Waltons receive news about John-Boy.
185	10	"The Waiting"	Philip Leacock	Kathleen Hite	November 22, 1979
The Waltons hear that John-Boy has been found in a hospital in Europe and transferred to Washington, D.C. They visit him in the hospital, finding him bandaged and unconscious. Olivia moves there, becomes a Red Cross caseworker, and befriends a young amputee who has no family.
186	11	"The Silver Wings"	Stan Lathan	Michael McGreevey	November 29, 1979
Jim-Bob falls for an attractive older woman, the wife of an Air Corps pilot, and helps her do home repairs. After he gives her perfume, she realizes he has become obsessed and tells him they can only be friends. Then she learns her husband was KIA. Jim-Bob takes his first ride in a biplane. Serena works on scout merit badges, then wanders into the woods at night.
187	12	"The Wager"	Gwen Arner	Story by : Claylene Jones; Teleplay by : E.F. Wallengren	December 13, 1979
Mary Ellen and Erin try to prove they can do anything as well as men, so they enter the 1st Annual Run and Ride Race in Rockfish and eagerly train with Elizabeth coaching for the race.
188	13	"The Spirit"	Herbert Hirschman	Kathleen Hite	December 20, 1979
A series of thefts worries the community, while Jeffrey makes friends with a mysterious visitor (Ned Bellamy), who is an escaped German prisoner. Corabeth's holiday pageant is cancelled.
189	14	"The Fastidious Wife"	Gwen Arner	Loraine Despres	December 27, 1979
Cindy follows a book's advice on how to be a good wife, but ends up exhausting herself. Serena and Jeffrey adopt a cat which has a litter of kittens.
190	15	"The Unthinkable"	Ralph Waite	Dan Ullman	January 3, 1980
Jason realizes the full horrors of war when his Jewish fellow soldier Ted Lupinsky (Todd Susman) reveals that his grandfather was killed in a Nazi extermination camp. Jason invites him to stay with the Walton family over the weekend. Meanwhile, Elizabeth must deal with being teased and called a "teacher's pet" when she earns straight A's on her report card.
191	16	"The Idol"	Gwen Arner	Juliet Packer	January 10, 1980
Elizabeth makes friends with the new progressive school teacher, Ms. Lamphere (Susan Krebs), but then discovers she has a terminal illness. The teacher devotes a class session to childbirth over Corabeth's objections. Meanwhile, as the time nears for Cindy and Ben's baby to arrive, Ben waits it out drinking. Ben can't be found when Cindy goes into labor, so the Waltons escort her to the hospital, giving birth to their daughter Virginia.
192	17	"The Prodigals"	Stan Lathan	Robert Pirosh	January 17, 1980
Josh and Jeffrey get into major trouble when they crapshoot. Jeffrey steals money from Ike's store, and Josh is blamed. The truth comes out after Jeffrey tries to run away. Meanwhile, Ben, although married, wrestles with whether to join the Navy.
193	18	"The Remembrance"	Herbert Hirschman	Marion Hargrove	January 24, 1980
Grandpa's childhood friend, the independent Cousin Zadok (Woody Chambliss), hikes a long distance to Walton's Mountain to keep a 20-year-old appointment. He charms the family with his homespun wit. Zadok wills his experimental orchard to the University and gives the Waltons a family-heirloom fiddle. Jason meets a beautiful young WAC officer on base, who is annoyed at him, but later visits the family.
194	19	"The Inspiration"	Ralph Waite	E.F. Wallengren	January 31, 1980
Grandma returns home and meets Rose. Miss Mamie refuses to have cataract surgery, so John and Mary Ellen move Grandma in with the Baldwins to convince them that surgery is the right thing to do. Elizabeth tries different ways to get a boy to ask her to a dance but ends up going with Drew (Tony Becker).
195	20	"The Last Straw"	Harry Harris	William Parker	February 7, 1980
One thing after another goes wrong for John, who is swamped with orders at the mill. When the motor from the old power saw blows out, it becomes the "last straw," and he quits the lumber business. Jeffrey builds a racing cart for a school project and hopes Ike will bring the All-American Soap Box Derby to Walton's Mountain.
196	21	"The Traveling Man"	Herbert Hirschman	Kathleen Hite	February 14, 1980
Stanley Perkins (William Schallert), an old beau of Rose's who danced with her back in Baltimore, comes to Walton's Mountain and proposes to her, even planning to buy a house nearby. However, she realizes he wants to move to California to take a better sales position.
197	22	"The Furlough"	Harry Harris	Juliet Packer	February 21, 1980
John-Boy returns to Walton's Mountain, physically healthy but mentally tormented by the fact that he can't remember the plane crash he was in. The girlfriend of his drowned co-pilot visits him. Ike ignores his military draft notice and is arrested for evasion, until the authorities realize he is overage.
198	23	"The Medal"	Walter Alzmann	Rod Peterson	February 28, 1980
Mary Ellen falls for a fiery young Mexican-American paratrooper (Enrique Castillo) whose life Curt saved at Pearl Harbor. He gets into a scuffle with some sailors who insult him at Godsey's store. Corabeth encounters a former admirer who begs her to meet him for a romantic tryst at his hotel before he is sent overseas.
199	24	"The Valediction"	Harry Harris	Claire Whitaker	March 13, 1980
Jim-Bob contemplates failing a school examination so he won't have to be valedictorian. Once he graduates, he and his classmates enlist in the military. Corabeth suggests a too-frilly graduation ceremony. Meanwhile, all the Walton boys are sent overseas for active duty when the Allies invade France. Erin gets a "Dear Joan" letter from Ashley Longworth Jr.
—	—	"The Waltons: A Decade of The Waltons"	Harry Harris & Philip Leacock	Earl Hamner	May 22, 1980
As the family prepares a surprise party for Grandma's birthday, they reminisce (via flashbacks) about various events in their lives.

=== Season 9 (1980–1981) ===
No. overall	No. in season	Title	Directed by	Written by	Original release date
200	1	"The Outrage"	Philip Leacock	Claire Whitaker & Rod Peterson	November 20, 1980
201	2	"The Outrage"	Philip Leacock	Claire Whitaker & Rod Peterson	November 27, 1980
Harley (Hal Williams) is accused of escaping prison for a murder (in self-defense) 9 years prior and is reluctantly arrested by Sheriff Bridges. John fights to clear Harley's name by traveling to Warm Springs, Georgia, and gets President Roosevelt to issue Harley an official pardon just before the President's sudden death, which the nation mourns. Meanwhile, Elizabeth spends her time with her new horse Molly, and Corabeth resigns from the general store when Ike accuses her of being too much of a businesswoman and not enough of a wife.
202	3	"The Pledge"	Lawrence Dobkin	Kathleen Hite	December 4, 1980
Mary Ellen attempts to enroll in medical school to become a doctor after the community's beloved "Sweet Billy" (Richard Lineback) dies, but she is discouraged by the school's sexist Dean. Meanwhile, Jason receives many birthday presents as he and John-Boy fight in France.
203	4	"The Triumph"	Philip Leacock	Robert Pirosh	December 18, 1980
V-E Day (8 May 1945) arrives, but Jason and his squad must contend with a German sniper who doesn't know it's over. Ben deals with the Japanese in the Pacific. Jim-Bob catches a very slow ride toward home on a mule cart; the Godseys are caught and called before a panel for occasionally selling groceries without ration stamps; and Ike's store is burglarized.
204	5	"The Premonition"	Bernard McEveety	E.F. Wallengren	December 25, 1980
John-Boy falls deeply in love with a French girl in Paris. Cindy dreams she sees Ben, then learns the Japanese captured him and his fellow seamen.
205	6	"The Pursuit"	Philip Leacock	Michael McGreevey	January 1, 1981
Jim-Bob comes home on leave but runs into trouble when a girl (Jennifer Jason Leigh) claims to be pregnant with his child. Mary Ellen finds the girl is only faking a pregnancy. Meanwhile, Jason reunites with Toni in Paris, and Ben and his navy buddies defy the Japanese commandant in the POW camp by raising a makeshift US flag.
206	7	"The Last Ten Days"	Bernard McEveety	Marion Hargrove	January 8, 1981
Ben and his fellow POWs are worried they might be executed after the dropping of atomic bombs on Hiroshima and Nagasaki to ensure the end of the war. Meanwhile, Jason and Toni have differing plans for their future together.
207	8	"The Move"	Harvey S. Laidman	Kathleen Hite	January 15, 1981
Ben returns from the Pacific theater and enthusiastically plans to go to Engineering college. But he changes his mind and stays in the mill after the family receives the unwelcome news that Olivia's tuberculosis has recurred. She has to go to an Arizona sanatorium, and John decides to go with her.
208	9	"The Whirlwind"	Nell Cox	Claire Whitaker	January 22, 1981
Jason bites off more than he can chew when he buys the Dew Drop Inn and tries to repair it for reopening. It proves a success, and the neighbors come to celebrate. Mary Ellen, believing her husband was killed at Pearl Harbor, accepts Jonesy's marriage proposal until she receives shocking news that makes her break the engagement.
209	10	"The Tempest"	Gabrielle Beaumont	E.F. Wallengren	February 5, 1981
Mary Ellen goes in search of her supposedly late husband in Florida after receiving information that a Curtis Packer is alive and identical to her Curt (now played by Scott Hylands). When she finds him, he initially pretends to have amnesia, then admits that due to his injury in Pearl Harbor, he can't father any more children. Meanwhile, Jonesy is hired by J.D. Pickett and is immediately made Erin's boss, but she resigns until Pickett begs her to return, offering a substantial raise. Jonesy then resigns, reunites with a returning Mary Ellen, and becomes a geology professor at Boatright. Corabeth starts a realtor business and tries to convince the Baldwins to sell and move.
210	11	"The Carousel"	Herbert Hirschman	Robert Pirosh	February 12, 1981
After Cindy's father dies in a car accident, she discovers she was adopted. She finds out about her past, eventually meeting her birth mother. Meanwhile, Drew moves in with the Waltons while his family visits his ill grandmother in Richmond, to Elizabeth's delight.
211	12	"The Hot Rod"	Bob Sweeney	Scott Hamner	February 19, 1981
Having just been discharged from the military, Jim-Bob and Jodie carouse and cause trouble with their new 'hot rod' until the sheriff straightens them out. The Baldwins still is discovered by the government, and they come to dismantle it but Ike helps them find a way to continue making the recipe.
212	13	"The Gold Watch"	Walt Gilmore	Juliet Packer	February 26, 1981
Stanley Perkins, Rose's salesman beau, returns from his 'dream sales territory' out west. But he’s hiding a secret. He is hired at Godsey's store and proves very helpful until an incident causes nervous flashbacks. Meanwhile, Toni tries to help Jason when the Dew Drop Inn's business starts to decline.
213	14	"The Beginning"	Lawrence Dobkin	Kathleen Hite	March 5, 1981
Walton's Mountain receives a new Reverend, Tom Marshall (Kip Niven), who proceeds to renovate the dilapidated church with the assistance of the Waltons and friends. Meanwhile, Jason and Toni consider marriage, but embarrassment over religious differences threatens their plans.
214	15	"The Pearls"	James Sheldon	Mary Worrell	March 12, 1981
Corabeth's flapper sister, Orma Lee (Ronnie Claire Edwards in a dual role), arrives and creates fun and concern in the community. At the same time, Elizabeth tries to run away to her parents at an Arizona sanitarium, but she is found at the nearby bus station.
215	16	"The Victims"	Lawrence Dobkin	Juliet Packer	March 19, 1981
The Waltons involve the sheriff as they help rescue the battered wife (Carol Jones) of a violent veteran (Ben Andrews) who has flashbacks of combat. At the same time, Jim-Bob is cheated as he tries his hand in the war surplus market.
216	17	"The Threshold"	Herbert Hirschman	Scott Hamner	April 2, 1981
John-Boy returns home and tries for a job in Boatwright University's new television department, but must convince the trustees with a speech. Meanwhile, Jim-Bob makes a TV to watch John-Boy. Zuleika Dunbar competes with Rose for Stanley's affections, so she tries to lose weight, and the Walton girls make her a stylish dress.
217	18	"The Indiscretion"	James Sheldon	E.F. Wallengren	May 7, 1981
Corabeth moves in with the Waltons after finding old love letters and suspecting that Ike is seeing another woman. He finally talks her into staying in the marriage. Drew boldly asks Elizabeth to spend the night together, but she declines. Alvy Moore has an appearance as a store customer.
218	19	"The Heartache"	Herbert Hirschman	Kathleen Hite	May 14, 1981
Stanley Perkins once again proposes to Rose, and she accepts. However, after discovering she has a heart condition, she breaks the engagement, not wanting to keep him from his dream of traveling. Cindy discovers she dislikes working at the dress shop and would rather stay at home.
219	20	"The Lumberjack"	Harvey S. Laidman	Carol Zeitz	May 21, 1981
Erin falls for Paul Northridge (Morgan Stevens), the handsome son of a wealthy lumberman (Richard Eastham). Ike and Jim-Bob try to get-rich-quick by hunting for uranium with a geiger counter.
220	21	"The Hostage"	Herbert Hirschman	Marjorie Fowler	May 28, 1981
After Mary Ellen saves Sissie Crooks (Debbie Lytton), an underage girl, from an arranged marriage with a pervert, the Waltons and Sheriff Bridges must contend with a very disgruntled groom when he kidnaps Elizabeth. Also, cantankerous cousin Octavia (Mary Wickes) visits the Baldwins.
221	22	"The Revel"	Harry Harris	Scott Hamner	June 4, 1981
John-Boy goes to New York City again to submit his third book for publication. But after his manuscript is rejected, he feels sorry for himself and returns home feeling like a failure. Meanwhile, the Baldwin sisters plan an elegant reunion ball for their finishing school class, but no one comes except the neighbors. This is the series finale. CBS cancelled the show due to declining ratings. Earl Hamner Jr and the producers also felt that the series had run its course, with the cast and the crew ready to move on to other projects.

=== Reunion movies (1982–1997) ===
Title	Directed by	Written by	Original release date
A Wedding on Walton's Mountain	Lee Philips	Marjorie Fowler and Claylene Jones	February 22, 1982
In 1947, plans for Erin and Paul's wedding are disrupted by the unexpected return of her ex-beau Ashley Longworth Jr., who is now a widower. John visits from Arizona to help Ben and Paul save the family lumber business.
Mother's Day on Walton's Mountain	Gwen Arner	Juliet Law Packer	May 9, 1982
Mary Ellen and Jonesy finally marry. However, as Mother's Day approaches, she finds herself missing her mother, Olivia, still recovering in a sanitarium in Arizona. After Mary Ellen is hurt when her car collides with a deer and is advised by a doctor never to get pregnant again, she fears Jonesy will lose interest in her. Meanwhile, Aimee Godsey [played by DeAnna Robbins in this and the next movie] returns home from boarding school, but her flirtatious and sophisticated behavior alienates her local friends.
A Day for Thanks on Walton's Mountain	Harry Harris	Kathleen Hite	November 22, 1982
Approaching Thanksgiving 1947, Elizabeth feels sad about those who cannot be there, including her boyfriend Drew, her parents, and John-Boy. Also, newlyweds Erin and Paul want to move out; Jason decides to make more of his musical talent, while Jim-Bob asks the Baldwin sisters to help him expand his garage business. In New York City, John-Boy is in a relationship with Jane Schuler (Melinda Naud), who tries to help him deal with writer's block. Mary Ellen and Jonesy must fatten up a turkey for the big day. John Curtis continuously runs off to the woods to meet an invisible "friend." The family is surprised to find out who it is while looking through a family album. [Note: Robert Wightman's last appearance as John-Boy.]
A Walton Thanksgiving Reunion	Harry Harris	Claire Whitaker and Rod Peterson	November 21, 1993
In November 1963, the Waltons and their families return to the mountain for Thanksgiving, including John-Boy and his new fiancée Janet. Several days later, they received the tragic news that President Kennedy had been assassinated in Dallas, Texas. Meanwhile, Erin and a fellow employee are trying to get over their unfaithful spouses. John and Ben lock horns over their old, run-down truck; Cindy tries to convince Ben to adopt a child; Corabeth wants nothing to do with Aimee after she marries a mechanic; and Toni is tired of Jason going away on concert tours. [Notes: Richard Thomas returns to his role as John-Boy Walton for this and the two subsequent movies. Rachel Longaker returns as Aimee Godsey in her final appearance.]
A Walton Wedding	Robert Ellis Miller	Claire Whitaker and Rod Peterson	February 12, 1995
John-Boy and Janet are about to be wed on Walton's Mountain, though Janet's overbearing Aunt Flo (Holland Taylor) has put herself in charge of planning it and may drive everyone crazy. Olivia enrolls in an American Studies course at Boatwright. John is at odds with Ben and Drew over a deal Ben made with a nearby developer. Toni is expecting yet another child, Corabeth attempts to become a writer through a mail-order correspondence course, and Grandma becomes upset at John-Boy's article about her father.
A Walton Easter	Bill Corcoran	Julie Sayres	April 27, 1997
In 1969, John and Olivia are looking forward to celebrating their anniversary. John-Boy and Janet are about to have their first child, and the family and community are looking forward to Easter. Janet initially resists John-Boy's plan to maintain a home on the mountain for visits but relents when she realizes how much the area means to him. Elizabeth, home from the Peace Corps, hears that Drew left her for another girl; John and Drew attempt to make a sale with rocking chairs Drew built; John receives a surprise from the Baldwins. Now teaching at the old school, Olivia helps a new student build up encouragement in his education.

=== Retrospective (2010) ===
Title	Directed by	Written by	Original release date
A Walton's Family Reunion	Doug Butts	LeeAnne Burnett Morse and Mary McDonough	October 18, 2010
Surviving cast members and creator Earl Hamner reminisce about the series and their lives since its original run.
