= Red Badge of Courage =

Red Badge of Courage may refer to:

- The Red Badge of Courage, a novel by Stephen Crane
- The Red Badge of Courage (1951 film), starring Audie Murphy and Bill Mauldin
- The Red Badge of Courage (1974 film), television film starring Richard Thomas
