= Barbara Fallis =

American ballet dancer and educator

- Born: 1923/1924; Denver, Colorado, U.S.
- Died: September 5, 1980 (aged 56); New York City, U.S.
- Occupation: Ballet dancer
- Spouse: Richard Thomas (m. 1950)
- Children: 2; including Richard Thomas
- Career
- Former groups: New York City Ballet; Company Alicia Alonso; American Ballet Theatre

Barbara Fallis (1923/1924 – September 5, 1980) was an American ballet dancer and educator. She danced for many prominent companies, including the American Ballet Theatre and New York City Ballet, and later started her own school, the New York School of Ballet, with husband Richard Thomas.

== Early life ==
Fallis was born in 1923 or 1924 in Denver, Colorado. Shortly after, her family moved from the United States to London, England for her father's work. The Fallis family remained in London for 12 years until World War II. Her love and pursuit of dance began during this time. She and her mother attended many performances by notable dance companies of the time, including Ballet Russe, which spurred Barbara's interest in dance at a young age.

Fallis began her more serious study of dance at the age of 12 with Joan Lawson. Shortly after, she auditioned to train under Ninette De Valois for the Vic-Wells Ballet. Fallis studied at the Sadler's Wells Ballet School, directly tied to the Vic-Wells Ballet, which would later become the Royal Ballet. De Valois only allowed dancers into the school who she believed were worthy of also being in the company, which gave Barbara many opportunities to begin performing in the corps de ballet. However, her time at the Vic-Wells was short-lived, as the Fallis family was forced to move back to the United States because of the war.

== Life and career ==
Upon relocation to America, the Fallis family settled in New York City. Here Barbara was able to audition for Ballet Theatre with Lucia Chase. She began dancing with Ballet Theatre, later known as American Ballet Theatre, in 1941 at the age of 16. Her first performance with the company was in Les Sylphides in Mexico. During her eight years with Ballet Theatre, Fallis worked with many prominent choreographers, including Michel Fokine, Antony Tudor, Bronislava Nijinska, and George Balanchine in many original works for the company. For example, she was in the corps de ballet of Antony Tudor's Pillar of Fire, which premiered for the first time in 1942. In 1948, she had a leading role in Les Patineurs, alongside John Kriza and Cynthia Risely. Fallis said she preferred roles in the company, over soloist parts, as it enabled her to perform as much as possible.

In 1948, Fallis left Ballet Theatre to join Company Alicia Alonso (now the Cuban National Ballet) in Cuba. It was in Cuba that she met fellow dancer and husband Richard Thomas. The couple married in Cuba in 1950 and had their first child, Richard Thomas, in 1951, before returning to New York in 1953.

Upon their return to New York City, both Barbara and Richard secured positions in the New York City Ballet dancing with Balanchine. Fallis remained with New York City Ballet until 1958. During that time, she danced in such performances as Western Symphony and Balanchine's first Nutcracker. In 1958, she left New York City Ballet and began a short period of performances at Jacob's Pillow.

In 1963, Barbara and Richard founded The New York School of Ballet where they began to train young dancers. During the early days of the school's founding, the couple also alternated teaching at the Pennsylvania Ballet in Philadelphia which helped fund their school. In 1969, the school relocated to the former studios of the School of American Ballet after being offered the space by George Balanchine and Lincoln Kerstein. Here, they trained noteworthy students of the school such as Eliot Feld, Twyla Tharp, Sean Lavery, Debbie Allen, Cynthia Gregory, and Christine Sarry.

Later in 1975, subsequent to Feld's departure from the school, Barbara and Richard founded the company U.S. Terpsichore to provide their students with performance opportunities. The couple's second child, Bronwyn Thomas, as well as their son, Richard Thomas, were among the performing members of the company. Her son, Richard, was also a well-known child actor, who performed on the television series The Waltons. The company toured a wide variety of repertory including over 30 ballets in both contemporary and classical styles. U.S. Terpsichore was very successful, and the funds raised from the touring performances continually funded the New York School of Ballet.

Fallis taught at the school alongside her husband until her death on September 5, 1980. She died at New York Hospital, where she was being treated for cancer, at age 56.
