= Back chat =

Back chat or backchat may refer to:

== Broadcasting ==
- Backchat (1995 TV series), an American show in the mid-1990s
- Backchat (2013 TV series), a British show starting in 2013
- Backchat, a 1980s Australian radio program hosted by Fran Kelly
- Backchat, an Australian television show hosted by Tim Bowden, 1986–1994
- Backch@t, a New Zealand television show hosted by Bill Ralston, 1998–2000
- Rugby League Back Chat, a British television show from the Premier Sports channel

== Music and performance ==
- "Back Chat", a 1982 song by the band Queen
- Backchat (ballet), a ballet produced by Eliot Feld
- Backchat (quartet), winner of the Rising Star competition in the 2001 Sweet Adelines International competition
- "Backchat", a track on the 2007 compilation album Watch the Ride by DJ Zinc
