= It's a Miracle (TV series) =

- Genre: Reality television
- Written by: Jule Gilfillan; Chris Pechin
- Directed by: Adam Briles; Ron Brody
- Presented by: Richard Thomas; Roma Downey
- Country of origin: United States
- Original language: English
- No. of seasons: 6

Production
- Production location: Fontana, California
- Production companies: Clearlake Productions; Paxson Entertainment; Tri-Crown Productions (seasons 1–2); Weller/Grossman Productions (season 6)

Original release
- Network: PAX TV
- Release: September 6, 1998 – September 1, 2004

It's a Miracle is a television series that aired on PAX TV between September 6, 1998 and August 12, 2006. Initially hosted by Billy Dean and Nia Peeples and then Richard Thomas, and later by Roma Downey, it explored case studies of people who experienced perceived miracles during their lifetime. This included stories of a pet that saved lives of family members, and the success of someone who born -drug addicted and abandoned. The show also covered the near death of a surfer who was in high water wells when they were knocked unconscious by their surf board.

The show format could be altered to fit into half-hour or hour-long slots, varying the number of case studies shown in each episode as needed.

The show currently is shown in Europe, Africa and the Middle East on Zone Reality. It is also available on Amazon Prime Video.
