= The Master of Ballantrae (1984 film) =

1984 television movie directed by Douglas Hickox

- Genre: Adventure
- Based on: The Master of Ballantrae by Robert Louis Stevenson
- Written by: William Bast
- Directed by: Douglas Hickox
- Starring: Michael York; Richard Thomas
- Music by: Bruce Broughton
- Country of origin: United States; United Kingdom
- Original language: English

Production
- Executive producers: Larry White; Patrick Dromgoole
- Producers: Hugh Benson; Peter Graham Scott
- Production locations: England; Scotland; Wales
- Cinematography: Bob Edwards
- Editor: Geoff Shepherd
- Running time: 180 minutes
- Production companies: Columbia Pictures Television; HTV; Hallmark Hall of Fame
- Budget: $5 million

Original release
- Network: CBS
- Release: January 31, 1984
- Network: ITV
- Release: April 16, 1984

The Master of Ballantrae is a 1984 TV movie based on the 1889 novel by Robert Louis Stevenson. It was a co production between the US and Britain for the Hallmark Hall of Fame. In Britain it aired on ITV in two parts in April 1984.

== Plot ==
The action starts in 1745, when Bonnie Prince Charlie lands in Scotland and the last Jacobite rebellion breaks out. James, the Master of Ballantrae, is a brave but foolish and hot-headed young man. He decides to join the uprising, against the advice of his father, Lord Durisdeer, and younger brother, Henry Durie. Eventually it is decided that one brother must join the Jacobites, but the other must remain loyal to the government so that, no matters who wins, the family's future will be safe. There is historical truth here, as many Irish and Scottish families did exactly this during the Jacobite years. In fact, exiled Jacobites living in France often received money from their relatives and friends in Great Britain and Ireland.

For the sake of the family, it would be best that James, the Master of Ballantrae, as the eldest son, stays loyal to the government; and his younger brother joins the rebels but The Master will not have it, as he craves adventure. He insists in tossing a coin and he wins ... that is, he wins the right to join the losing side. The Jacobites are defeated in the Battle of Culloden, and James is reported dead. In fact, he survives the battle and flees to England, where he teams up with another survivor, Irishman Francis Burke. They make it to the coast, where they are captured by pirates ... but James' charm and cunning soon allow him to get the upper hand and he becomes their co-leader, alongside their skipper, Captain Teach (not to be confused with the real Blackbeard of that name).

Back home, brother Henry is held in contempt by his tenants and by James' sweetheart, their cousin Alison Graeme, who feel he should have joined the Jacobites. The family is covered in debt, but Alison would bring a dowry, and it is agreed that she should now marry Henry. She still loves James, but he has been reported dead, but Henry has always hopelessly loved her. She marries out of love for the family; he out of love for her. It is a "marriage of convenience" and Alison is distressed when she learns that James is alive.

Meanwhile the Master of Ballantrae and Colonel Burke leave the pirate ship and end up first in North America, then in Paris and then in India. It has always been clear that James Durie is a scoundrel, but he has good looks and charm, and Michael York certainly fitted the role. The Master seduces everyone he encounters but as the action progresses the character becomes darker and increasingly evil. In the end, James Durie/Michael York reminds that the Devil is, after all, a gentleman.

The younger brother does his best to run the estate, but he is too dull to charm anyone, and only Mr MacKellar appreciates his qualities. James, the Master of Ballantrae, hates his brother for having taken his place, although it was his own (James') choice to join the Jacobites. The Master is always demanding money from poor Henry, not only because of the money, but because he wishes to exact revenge. Henry, initially kind and good, also becomes a darker person as the plot continues, because his brother drives him to despair.

== Cast ==
- Michael York as James Durie, the Master of Ballantrae
- Richard Thomas as Henry Durie
- Timothy Dalton as Colonel Francis Burke
- Finola Hughes as Alison Graeme
- John Gielgud as Lord Durrisdeer
- Ian Richardson as Mr. MacKellar
- Kim Hicks as Jessie Broun
- Nickolas Grace as Secundra Dass
- Brian Blessed as Captain Teach
- Ed Bishop as Pinkerton
- The British soldiers portrayed at the Battle of Culloden were played by men of RAF Supply Trade Training School, RAF Hereford.

== Production ==
It was filmed on location in England and Wales.

Richard Thomas was cast as the good brother Henry:

When I began to read the novel I thought "the last thing I need to play is the good brother, Henry. I played John Boy [on The Waltons] for five years and once that happened casting people weren't sending me a lot of heavies. But as I read Ballantrae through, the character of Henry becomes darker and more sinister. By the end there is madness in him: good and evil are all mixed up.

Thomas had fenced since he was 14 years old and still did it several times a week but this was the first time he was able to do it on film. For the duel with York, neither used doubles.

== Reception ==
The Christian Science Monitor called it "engrossing 20th century entertainment."

The New York Times said it was "well acted, swiftly paced and eminently watchable."

John Gielgud's performance earned him an Emmy nomination as Best Supporting Actor in a Limited Series or Special.
