= 1, 2, 3 Go! =

American TV series

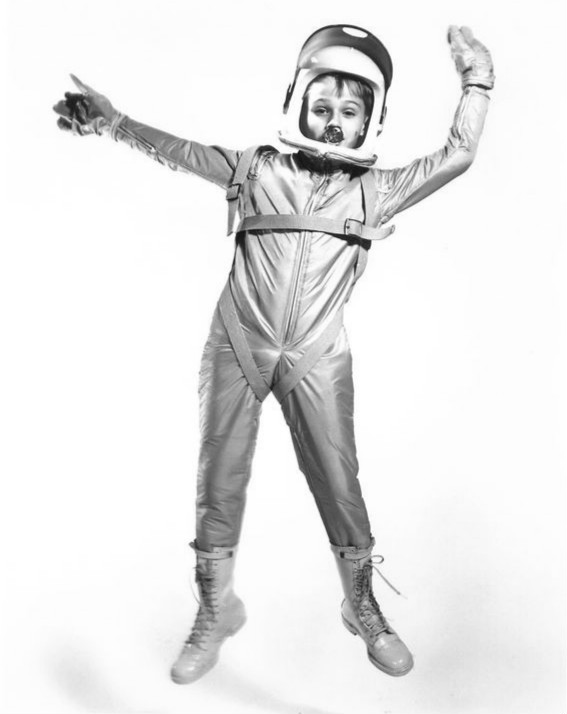
- Richard Thomas in the program's premiere.
- Genre: Family
- Country of origin: United States
- Original language: English

Production
- Producer: NBC Public Affairs
- Running time: 30 Minutes (Inc. Adverts)

Original release
- Release: October 8, 1961 – May 27, 1962

1, 2, 3 Go! is a 1961–1962 American-filmed children's television series hosted by Jack Lescoulie with Richard Thomas. The show also featured Richard Morse, only for the first episode as The Courier, and Joseph Warren, who portrayed Thomas Jefferson in the first episode.

The half-hour educational series was telecast on NBC, opening with this theme song:

Wonder what it'll be today?
What excitement is on its way?
You can find out just by saying...
1, 2, 3 Go!

Each episode had a theme and was narrated by Thomas. The episodes show what it's like to be in various occupations, including fire fighter, astronaut and trapeze artist.

The show established that adults and children were on an equal footing, sometimes with the child in a superior position. For example, in a show with a theme of cinematic special effects, Lescoulie is struck in the neck by an arrow. Although Richard explains it is only a special effect, Lescoulie remains concerned. In the narration, Richard observes, "Jack was getting worried about the arrow, but I told him to stop crying."

During the Halloween weekend of 1961, John Zacherle appeared for an episode exploring haunted houses.

== Production ==
The show was produced by NBC Public Affairs.
