= List of The Waltons characters =

The Waltons is an American television series that aired for nine seasons (1972–1981) on the Columbia Broadcasting System (CBS-TV) network. A further six made-for-TV reunion movies were made and aired in the following 1980s and 1990s. Below is a list of the series / films various principal characters and the actors who played them.

== Main characters ==
=== John "John-Boy" Walton Jr. ===
John Walton Jr. (Richard Thomas, pilot episode and seasons 1-5, guest for 3 episodes in season 6; and three movies; Robert Wightman, seasons 8–9, and two movies). This first Walton child, known as "John-Boy," was born in 1916, and is the eldest son and child of Olivia Walton and John Walton Sr. John-Boy is based on creator / author Earl Hamner Jr (1923–2016), who narrates the opening and closing of each episode as the present-day adult John-Boy Walton. The main character, who is also the oldest of seven children, John-Boy is a serious thinker and avid reader with a passion to become a writer. He constantly records his thoughts about his family, friends, and circumstances, and writes stories in a journal. Normally a calm, quiet sort, John-Boy occasionally displays a touch of afiery temper and can become defensive and indignant when a situation warrants it. He is sensitive and empathetic with a drive to succeed in his chosen profession. He is deeply touched by tragic events, such as the 1937 Hindenburg airship disaster, and being injured trying to rescue people. Prior to World War II, John-Boy is the only member of his family seriously concerned about the rise of dictator Adolf Hitler, in Germany and is infuriated when his community attempts to burn German language books in response to hearing about Nazis doing the same to American books deemed subversive. After becoming the first member of his family to graduate from college at Boatwright University, he moves to New York City to fulfill his dream of becoming an author. After the 1941 Japanese Attack on Pearl Harbor, he immediately enlists in the U.S. Army and writes as a war correspondent for the U.S. Army's famous newspaper Stars and Stripes during the war.

In season 8, his parents learn he is missing in action and for weeks, John-Boy's location and condition are unknown to his family. Unbeknownst to them, the plane in which he was passenger / observer, the Katey Anne, was shot down and crashed into the sea near Great Britain while he was out looking for war stories. He and the pilot were forced to tread water to stay afloat, but after growing exhausted, his comrade succumbed to his injuries and drowned, while John-Boy, who had suffered extreme head trauma, lost consciousness as he was rescued from the sea. Due to the severity of his injuries, he slipped into a lengthy coma and was flown back to the United States to undergo more long-term medical care, leaving his parents to wait on his recovery. When he at last emerged from his coma, he was stricken with slight amnesia and no longer could participate in the war.

After World War II, he tried to return to New York at the promise of an opportunity waiting for him to tell his story, like many other veterans, but lack of demand for wartime books due to an over-saturated market of war stories knocked his story from publishers' consideration. He returned to Walton's Mountain to briefly teach courses in the new television department at Boatwright University. John-Boy then turned his attention to reporting news instead and gained a steady means of living once more, but would one day have to break the news of the shocking John F. Kennedy assassination, in Dallas, Texas on November 22, 1963. It was in this profession that he finally found the love of his life, Janet, and they eventually married. Their first children were twins, born during the Easter film special.

=== John Walton Sr. ===
Family patriarch John, called Daddy by his children, (pilot, Andrew Duggan; series and sequels, Ralph Waite) is a hard-working, industrious man who runs a small family sawmill on his property on Walton's Mountain. Another main character, he is the second son of Esther Walton (née Morgan) and Zebulon Tyler Walton. He is the husband of Olivia Walton (née Daly) and father of John "John-Boy" Jr., Jason, Mary Ellen, Erin, Benjamin "Ben", James Robert "Jim-Bob" and his stillborn twin brother Joseph, and Elizabeth. He is usually good natured, wise, and fearless, ready to stand up to a challenge and tell things straight. These personality traits sometimes cause him to be stern with his children and wife, and when greatly stressed he is prone to "workaholism." John deeply loves and respects his wife, and calls her “Liv” or “Livie.”

John graduated high school in 1911 (making him born in about 1893) and served in the World War I. John will do anything to protect his family; he also wishes to see all of his children graduate from college, which he was unable to do, although he was the first in his family to graduate from high school. Despite his Baptist upbringing he, like his father Zeb, is ambivalent toward organized religion and otherwise deist. He holds life sacred. He does not approve of hunting animals for sport, but will hunt to provide food for his family. Despite his rejection of the Baptist Church, (he never underwent baptism), his wife Olivia calls him "the most God-fearing man I know."

We are told in the pilot that he dies in the year 1969 (the same year Earl Hamner's father also died).

In 2004, TV Guide magazine ranked him #3 on its "50 Greatest TV Dads of All Time" list.

=== Olivia Walton ===
Olivia, also known as Liv, Livie, or Mama, (pilot, Patricia Neal; series, Michael Learned) is John Walton Sr.'s soft-spoken, patient, religious, loving wife, who complements his tough-skinned, opinionated nature. She is the sister of Frances Daly of Edgemont, Virginia. She has seven children: John Jr., Jason, Mary Ellen, Erin, Ben, Jim Bob, and Elizabeth. An eighth child, Jim-Bob's twin brother Joseph, died at birth. Olivia also suffered a miscarriage in season two. She is usually gentle but firm and unafraid to speak up or administer discipline when needed. She especially hates being in debt. Like her mother-in-law Esther, she is a devout Southern Baptist, although her husband doesn't share her commitment to the organized religion of the church. Her Southern Baptist faith extends to the home, and she punishes the children by telling them to memorize verses from the Bible. She is willing to open her home to friends or strangers in need, but, during early seasons, is uncomfortable with her family associating with the Baldwin sisters because she strongly disapproves of their production of homemade liquor (moonshine), which they refer to as "Papa's Recipe”. (Olivia, along with the rest of the community, more warmly embraces the Baldwin sisters during later seasons.) Though she is mostly grounded and content with her life, Olivia also displays a dreamy side and a thirst for novelty, as seen in "The Airmail Man" (season two) where she dreams of flying in an airplane, and in "The Rebellion" (season five) when she gets a perm. She is also a natural artist. After John's brother Ben was killed in World War I, she resolved to never see another family member off to war and declined to be present when Mary Ellen's husband Curt shipped out for active duty. When her own sons got involved in the war as a result of the Pearl Harbor attack, she changed her mind.

Her background and family are not referenced to the same degree as John's. It is known that she displayed budding artistic talent in high school and considered going to college on a scholarship but instead chose to marry John when she was 16 and become a homemaker. It is implied she had John-Boy within a year or so of her marriage, setting her birth year around 1897–98. She is content that she made the right choice to become a wife and mother.

She survives polio in the first season, and develops tuberculosis later in the series.

Olivia overcomes her health challenges and becomes an active senior citizen; in the final reunion movie she is working as a school teacher at the Walton's Mountain school where daughter Erin has become principal. It is implied Olivia completed college courses to qualify for this job.

In a 1999 Archive of American Television interview, executive producer Earl Hamner Jr. stated that, when transitioning from the film to the TV series, he chose to recast the role of Olivia because he did not think that Patricia Neal's health would allow her to commit to the grind of a weekly television series. In her 1979 memoir, Neal suggested that she would have accepted the role, had it been offered to her.

=== Zebulon Tyler Walton ===
The Walton family elder, The Grandfather/Grandpa Walton (Pilot, Edgar Bergen; seasons 1–6, Will Geer), husband of grandma Esther Walton (née Morgan), and father of Benjamin Walton, who was killed in World War I, John Walton Sr., and an unknown Walton child (early in the first season, Zeb is showing John Boy military medals stored in a trunk, and mentions that they belonged to John Boy's Uncle "Matt" (Season 1, Episode 5). It can be logically assumed that since the medals are in Zeb's possession, rather than Olivia's parents, that this is the name of the third child, and that since they are military in nature, like Ben the elder, he never made it home from the "Great War".) Referred to as "Zeb" to friends, "Zeb" or "old fool" by his wife Esther (who in turn is lovingly referred to as "old woman" or "old girl"), "Pa" by his son John, "Grandpa" by Olivia and the rest of the family, and "the Grandfather" in the show's opening credits, likes to spend his time working with John in the sawmill, fishing, walking the mountain, occasionally playing a game of billiards at the pool table in the back of Ike Godsey's general store, and playing with and teaching his grandkids. As hardworking as son John, Grandpa is much more easygoing in general and has a mischievous yet wise and vibrant personality. An example of this was in one episode, when one of his grandchildren tried smoking and he caught them, and got them to stop the same way his father taught him: he had the boys smoke cigarettes, one after another, until they were sick. Grandma, John Sr., and Olivia didn't approve of his methods. He especially cherishes his wife (and vice versa), although he can often be found alone relaxing with the Baldwin sisters, happily sipping their "Recipe" (moonshine). He also tends to distrust his wife's Southern Baptist church, although he has a deep love and respect for God. He served in the Spanish–American War of 1898 (although he dramatized his involvement by telling tall tales and vivid war stories to his grandchild despite Esther's indignation) and is an amateur botanist. He has the habit of making ornate prayers at the dinner table and sometimes ends them with "awomen" in respect to "amen", and dislikes the use of the phrase, "The Civil War", preferring using the Southern term of "The War Between the States". Esther often complained about his rotund figure and tried to get him to diet, worrying about his heart. This was exemplified in "The Birthday"; as he was about to turn 73, he suffered a major heart attack and was bedridden for weeks. He often claimed that he would live to 101, but in the end, he suffered a second and final heart attack three years later.

Geer's real-life death from respiratory failure during the post-season six hiatus is reflected in the opening episode of the seventh season. It is learned that Grandpa had suddenly died while planting new tree seedlings up on Walton's Mountain and was buried on the mountain with a simple headstone plate reading: ZEBULON WALTON 1865–1941. During the remainder of the series, and at least three of the reunion film specials, he is frequently remembered by other characters; a photo hanging in the Walton living room is often visible, and sometimes even moves, which Esther takes as a sign of his spirit interacting with the photo and letting the rest of the family know he is still with them.

=== Esther Walton ===
Grandma (Ellen Corby), practical but feisty, quick-tempered and devout. "Grandma" Esther (née Morgan), is the wife of Zebulon Tyler ("Grandpa" Zeb) Walton and the mother of Benjamin "Ben" Walton (killed in World War I); John Walton Sr., husband of Olivia (née Daly); and their unknown sibling, Matthew. Like her husband, Grandma has plenty of wisdom to share with family and friends, peppered with the occasional "Good Lord!" or bestowing a cheekily-loving "You old fool!" on her husband. In her youth, she was nicknamed "Sissy" and had the dream of becoming a seamstress and opening her own business in Charlottesville and Zeb often wonders if she found happiness in lieu of her dreams not amounting to much over time.

In 1977, Ellen Corby's real life stroke was incorporated into the storyline and forced her to leave the show for a long period of recovery. Unfortunately, the effects of her stroke impaired her ability to speak cohesively and severely limited her dialogue thereafter, making it difficult for her character to communicate without having to convey her feelings through the voices of other characters indicating what she wants to say or do for her, or for her to physically write out her feelings. Corby's absence from the latter half of season five, and having her role drastically reduced from then on, was explained as Grandma frequently visiting relations in nearby Buckingham County. Corby was able to return for the sixth season's finale; she returned to being a regular cast member during season seven, though Corby's health forced her to drop to recurring status from season eight onward, only appearing in a few episodes per season; she appeared in five of the six reunion specials. An older John-Boy would go on to mention that "both of my grandparents are no longer alive", suggesting that Esther died in the later future, but no earlier than 1969 (the same year her son John was said to have died).

=== Jason Walton ===
Jason (Jon Walmsley) was born in the winter of 1918 (while his father John was overseas in France on the Western Front of the First World War), second son and child of "Daddy” and Olivia ("Mama,") Walton (née Daly) in Virginia; grandson of Zebulon ("Grandpa" Zeb) Walton and Esther ("Grandma”); nephew of Benjamin (Uncle Ben) Walton, plus another unknown aunt or uncle, and maternal aunt Frances Daly who lives in Edgemont; brother of John-Boy, Mary Ellen, Benjamin (Ben), Erin, James Robert (Jim-Bob), and Elizabeth, 1st Cousin of Olivia, and cousin-in-law of Bob Hill. Jason has a good relationship with all his siblings, but is especially close to his older brother John-Boy. Though the two have very different personalities and interests, they get along very well. The two became very close when John-Boy began college at nearby Boatwright University and their bond grew even stronger as the years went by. At age 15 in season one, he is a somewhat-introverted but good-natured musician who enjoys composing music with a harmonica, guitar, and piano. He is a favorite of the Baldwin sisters, who often ask him to play their parlor piano and sing for them. In season three, Jason attends the Kleinberg Conservatory of Music; in season four he lands a job playing honkytonk piano at local tavern / roadhouse The Dew Drop Inn (which he later comes to own himself a few years later), much to Grandma's and Olivia's chagrin. In season five, Jason joins the National Guard of Virginia in the late 1930s because of the worsening international situation and to earn some extra money at home. In season seven, after the Japanese attack on Pearl Harbor, he struggles with the idea of killing another man and considers becoming a conscientious objector. He ultimately decides against this, and by season eight he joins the U.S. Army and is quickly promoted to the rank of sergeant. While initially stationed as a drill instructor in the fictitious Camp Rockfish near the Jefferson County, he meets a beautiful WAC (Women's Army Corps) sergeant, Antoinette "Toni" Hazelton, who is also musically talented. Though Jason initially gets on Toni's nerves, they eventually fall in love and marry. They have several children, all named after country singers.

=== Mary Ellen Walton-Willard-Jones ===
Mary Ellen (Judy Norton Taylor) is the eldest of Olivia and John's daughters and third child, born in April 1920, and aged 13 in season one.

Throughout the first few seasons, she is a stubborn, rebellious teenager who believes others don't understand her. While something of a tomboy who enjoyed playing baseball, Mary Ellen was also prone to melodrama and vanity, engaging in a rivalry with "rich girl" Martha Rose Coverdale at the Walton's Mountain schoolhouse for the affections of the awkward but warm-hearted G.W. Haines. Mary Ellen matures into a wiser, strong-minded young woman and her childish fantasy of becoming a movie star gives way for a more reasonable and realistic ambition to go into nursing/ medicine after reading up on it, developing an interest, and influenced by the county nurse, Nora Jones. She then works to gain an education as a medical worker, and becomes a nurse. However, when she ends up taking care of the people out in the country, she concludes they need more medical expertise than she can offer them and continues studying medicine until she succeeds in becoming a doctor. Even though some frowned upon the idea of female doctors and she receives mixed support from her family, she refuses to let this stop her. Mary Ellen has a special relationship with each of her six siblings, but over the years grows especially close with her younger sister Erin.

In season five, Mary Ellen marries Dr. Curtis Willard (Curt), the town's new physician, and breaks off a prior engagement to medical intern David Spencer that she had rushed in to. In season six, they welcome a son, John Curtis. In season seven, Mary Ellen receives a telegram that Curt has been killed in the Japanese attack on Pearl Harbor, but in season nine she learns he is still alive, using an assumed name. When she journeys to find him in Florida, she discovers that he has changed a lot, including being unable to engage in sexual relations on account of his war injuries, and realizes that trying to continue their relationship is pointless because the war has traumatized him to the point of losing nearly all of his compassion and his desires. Mary Ellen finally lets go of Curt upon seeing he no longer wants to be a doctor or a husband, but keeps him as a friend who still shows affection towards their baby. She divorces him and finds a new beau, Jonesy, whom she met during the time she believed Curt had been killed and whom she had nearly married beforehand. Although this engagement is threatened once, she ends up marrying him. During their honeymoon, she has an accident and is told she cannot have more children, but she still has two more, Clay and Katie, by Jonesy. In 1963, Mary Ellen is called a "war widow," indicating that the divorce-shy have adopted an honorific white lie on her behalf.

=== Benjamin "Ben" Walton ===
Ben (Eric Scott) is named for his father John's brother (uncle) Ben, who was killed in France during World War I. Born in 1921, fourth-born Ben gets into trouble at precisely the wrong times and possesses fiery red hair and a temper to match. He has a bright mind and an entrepreneurial spirit but sometimes falls for get-rich-quick schemes and needs his father or John-Boy to bail him out. Even as an adult, running the sawmill in partnership with his father, he makes deals that don't turn out well. As an adolescent, he takes many jobs and strives to prove his maturity to the family, who he believed looked on him as a "child." Underneath his quick temper and bravado, Ben is a kind, compassionate person who cares very deeply for his family. He elopes with sweet, pretty Cindy Brunson and together they have two children, daughter Virginia (Ginny) and later son Charles Benjamin (Charlie).

In season eight, Ben joins the "Seabees" (Construction Battalion of the U.S. Navy) and is taken prisoner by the Japanese in the last months of the war in the summer of 1945. He and a fellow sailor, Norm, are freed in “The Last Ten Days" (season nine) by a sympathetic Japanese prison guard, who surrendered to them to preserve his life. Ben then returns home. At various times, Ben has run the saw mill with his father, Elizabeth's boyfriend Drew, and Erin's new husband Paul Northridge.

Ben and Cindy lost Ginny in a drowning accident and that they are considering adopting another child. Their heartbreak at losing their child and the emptiness that followed nearly tore them apart, but both of them tearfully admitted they needed to move on and find a new child to love, causing Ben to accept the idea of adoption after much resistance.

=== Erin Esther Walton Northridge ===
Erin (Mary Elizabeth McDonough), the fifth-born child and second daughter of Olivia Walton (née Daly) and John Walton Sr. Erin grows very close to her older sister Mary Ellen, though they often fight, especially in the early seasons. As a child, Erin could be prissy and a tattletale. She aspires to become a wife and mother, in direct contrast to Mary Ellen's ambitions. As she matures, Erin becomes an effective manager and a bright worker. Erin is considered the pretty one, not the scholar, and enters a county fair bathing suit beauty contest to the concern of her morally strict parents and Grandma. She falls in love many times throughout her teenage years. She works as a substitute telephone operator in nearby Rockfish early in season five while she is finishing high school. She graduates in 1937, and her age is mentioned as sixteen years old in "The Elopement". She struggles to find her place, as she is not musical like Jason, not an academic like John-Boy, and not interested in medicine like Mary Ellen. She takes a part-time job at a business college to buy a typewriter for John-Boy when the owner sees her answering and assisting callers at the unattended front desk. She is allowed to work her way through the business school and later becomes the executive secretary to its Mr. Pringle, and then later as personnel manager and secretary to loudmouthed incompetent businessman J.D. Pickett, owner of a local metal products fabricating company, serving as a defense supply plant during the ensuing war. Later, she becomes the plant's indispensable capable assistant manager.

Almost all of Erin's romances are ill-fated: the object of her affections either dies or proves to have poor character. After a brief affair and engagement with Ashley Longworth Jr, (Jonathan Frakes), but eventually she meets and marries Paul Northridge; they have three children: Susan, Amanda, and Peter. It is later revealed that they are divorced as Paul had become unfaithful. Erin has since earned a state teaching certificate, and is a school principal.

=== James Robert "Jim-Bob" Walton ===
James Robert (David W. Harper), better known as Jim-Bob, is the youngest Walton boy and sixth child of John Sr. and Olivia Walton. He and Joseph were born twins on January 13, but only he survived as his brother was stillborn. Jim-Bob is the only Walton child who was born in a hospital, rather than at home on the mountain. As a teenager, he passes his older brother Ben in height. He is particularly close to his younger sister Elizabeth. He is fascinated by airplanes and aspires to become a pilot; however, increasingly poor eyesight forces him to give up this dream. Due to his passion for the United States Army Air Corps. Jim-Bob is compelled to get a tattoo of their insignia, which he later regrets. He eventually becomes a mechanic and opens his own repair business in an old barn / shed just opposite Ike's general store. As he grows up, he collects scrap mechanical parts to build his own car which tends to break down from its ramshackle construction. After being unable to decide on the color, he paints it a bright yellow. While he and Jody are joyriding in the throes of post-war glee, his car is in a crash outside a pool hall. He sells the home-made vehicle to compensate for the damages and plans to build another. Jim-Bob has several girlfriends, including Ike and Corabeth's adopted daughter, Aimee Godsey and another young woman who feigned pregnancy to trick him into marrying her and just as quickly was sent out of his life (though John-Boy wonders if Jim-Bob is still seeing her in secret and not telling the rest of his family), but he never truly settles down with anybody. Instead, he becomes a hermit living in an airplane hangar right next to an adjacent airfield where he sometimes offers to fly people around and routinely works on planes. Jim-Bob's birth date is timeline error in the series: Trying to enlist after the Pearl Harbor attack, he's told that he's too young. If his birth date was January 1924, he would have been almost 18. Later he is shown graduating as the Class of 1944 in "The Valedictorian." However, in season three, he mentions that his birth date is June 13, 1924.

=== Elizabeth Tyler Walton Cutler ===
Elizabeth (Kami Cotler) is the youngest child of John and Olivia Walton. She was born in the fall of 1927 and age 6 when the series began. By the end of season five, John-Boy refers to Elizabeth as 12 years old and small for her age. She has her 13th birthday in season seven. She is free-spirited and outspoken, but sensitive, and shown to share John-Boy's love of reading and knack for writing. Her best friend, Aimee Godsey, is the adopted daughter of her father's second cousin, Corabeth, and general store owner, Ike Godsey. As a teenager, Elizabeth often babysits her nephew John-Curtis (son of sister Mary Ellen and first husband Dr. Curtis Willard) and her niece Virginia / "Ginny" (daughter of older brother Ben and Cindy). Later she travels in Europe and gets into a relationship that dissolves right as she was planning to get married; later she joins the Peace Corps of the early 1960s.Tony Becker portrays her boyfriend Drew Cutler, who goes through a first failed marriage in spite of not getting together with Elizabeth when she goes off to Europe, leading then to rekindle their feelings; and she and Drew get engaged.

=== Ike Godsey ===
A close friend of the Walton family and second cousin-in-law of John Walton Sr., is Isaac B. ("Ike") Godsey (pilot, with Woodrow Parfrey); later series as, Joe Conley, 1928–2013). He's the proprietor of the village general store, the local postmaster, party line telephone message-taker and at first, the only garage mechanic in Walton's Mountain until teenage Jim-Bob Walton later opens a garage across the road from the Mercantile in an old barn / shed after fixing Ike's motorcycle with sidecar he used for deliveries / errands. Ike has a kind heart, a source of local news, happenings and even occasional gossip. He's often let people slide awhile and have anything they want on credit, and pay him back whenever they can, much to the later disapproval and concern of new wife Corabeth. This is a constant source of friction and arguments. She tends to refuse people credit when Ike is out on business, and even while he is watching. Unfortunately for Ike, Corabeth doesn't agree with the way the store is run, so she takes it upon herself to do it herself, believing she can run the store better than Ike. After Corabeth refuses to listen to Ike, he has no option but to speak to John and Olivia about his problem and to ask them to speak to her. He is also World War I veteran, having served alongside John Walton Sr. and Sheriff Ep Bridges. During the Second World War, he serves as the town's Civil Defense and air raid warden. He offers the use of extra space in the back of the Mercantile which held the popular pool table as a classroom when a fanatic once burned down the one-room schoolhouse in an episode. He eventually marries John Sr.'s distant cousin Corabeth Walton who came to visit them when her parents died, and they later adopt a 10-years old daughter, Aimee. Later on, Ike suffers a heart attack brought on by stress and overwork and is forced to limit his activities as shopkeeper. He is implied to have passed away many years later when an older John-Boy remarks that "Ike's gone now." in a subsequent episode / film. In Season 8, Episode 22 ("The Furlough"), his full name is revealed as "Isaac Aloysius Godsey" after a clerical error at a U.S. Army military draft induction center transposed numbers in his birth date, which was revealed as September 24, 1901, and mailed him an induction notice.

=== Corabeth Walton Godsey ===
In season three, John Sr.'s second cousin Corabeth Walton (Ronnie Claire Edwards, 1933–2016), arrives in Walton's Mountain after her mother's death. After years of caring for her invalid parents, Corabeth is nervous and shy and has retreated into a shell. She holds some resentment toward her sister of a completely different personality, Orma Lee (also played by Edwards in a dual role), who left Corabeth to care for their parents and has since been married at least four times. Olivia and Esther encourage Corabeth and build up her self-esteem so she can express her new interest in storekeeper/family friend Ike Godsey. They eventually marry and after some settling down issues, eventually adopt a ten-years old, blonde-haired daughter, Aimee Louise (Rachel Longaker / DeAnna Robbins). Whether they married out of love or mutual loneliness is explored occasionally throughout the series. Marriage and motherhood cause Corabeth to flower into an eccentric, self-refined aspiring socialite—and the town busybody. She deals with several private battles: alcoholism, depression, temptation to infidelity, and her intense longing to forever abandon the rural backwater for a more cultured, cosmopolitan life. In later seasons she dresses in a flamboyant, urban manner with trendy hairstyles and bold dresses and suits, out of place with the Walton women and the conservative rural area. She is innovative, and improves the yard goods and millinery departments at Godsey's store. Humorously, she always addresses her husband as "Mr. Godsey" except for intimate private moments. Despite her desire to live someplace other than Walton's Mountain, Corabeth does seem to genuinely like and care for the Walton family. She regards Olivia as a friend, and attempts to help Jim-Bob with his studies, encouraging him to follow his dreams. Later in the series she trains and becomes a real-estate agent for the area.

=== Cindy Brunson Walton ===
Ben's passionate love interest, introduced in the season 7 episode 10 of "Day of Infamy;" (played first in one appearance in December 1978 by Robin Eisenman, and later by Leslie Winston), who portrayed Cindy for the rest of the series and reunion films, from 1979 to 1981. She made a striking entrance driving a characteristic expensive red roadster car and had a provocative reputation that earned her the nickname "Sinful Cindy" based on people's initial surface judgments of her. The real Cindy was sweet, caring, spirited, and hard-working. Ben suddenly decided to elope with her without consulting his family, which made them worry that he hadn't thought the decision through, but the couple proved to be sound as the moved into the house's side shed (of John-Boy's old newspaper office and printing press) plus soon became the parents of a healthy baby girl, Virginia, named after Cindy's home, and later nicknamed "Ginny". When Ben becomes one of the "Seabees" (Construction Battalion in the United States Navy), Cindy endures raising a child alone and having limited contact with her husband. During World War II's final months in 1945, Ben is taken prisoner in the Pacific Theater by Imperial Japanese troops during the last months of the war, and Cindy has a vision warning her of this danger, but the sudden unexpected atomic bombings in Japan and their surrender result in his release from captivity and safe return home.

Cindy's parentage is a sensitive topic for her. When she was little her mother became ill and died, which greatly upset her, and she becomes angry whenever people show disrespect for their mothers, or disregard for their children. In the season 9 episode "The Carousel," her father, a United States Army career officer, was caught in a storm while driving out to see her. He ran off the road and wrecked his car in the poor visibility, which caused his death. At his funeral, a mysterious woman appeared in the back among the crowd, triggering memories from Cindy's early childhood. She learned surprisingly from going through her military officer father's papers after he died that she had actually been adopted at birth. She investigated the matter further until she was able to make contact with the woman again and discover that this was her biological mother, who had been forced to give her up years before because Cindy's father had died before she was born and she wasn't able to raise a child alone. Later she married someone else, and her now husband had already figured out that she had a previous child out there somewhere. He lovingly responded to an ad in the Washington, D.C. newspapers that Cindy had earlier placed to find her mother, and although the woman was remorseful about the situation and reluctant to claim her daughter, Cindy went to meet her in a park in Washington wanting to find out about her and especially getting her back in her life and the two soon reconciled. In a case of dramatic irony, Cindy would end up considering adoption several years later after a tragic event caused her own and Ben's daughter little Virginia to drown, which drove her to the brink of despair. When she expressed a longing to take in a parent-less child, Ben Walton then decided that he could also learn to love such a new child as much as she would.

=== Rose Burton Perkins ===
Rose Burton (Peggy Rea, 1921–2011), is a Walton cousin who was introduced in season 8. After grandma Esther's role in the series begins to diminish because of her stroke, and the Walton children are growing up, she and her grandchildren Jeffrey and Serena show up at their house looking for a place to stay, and Rose is desperate to find a safe haven from their old residence / rowhouse in Baltimore. Rose's husband Burt Burton, a train conductor for the famous Baltimore and Ohio Railroad (B. & O.) has long since died and their son, who is enlisted in the military, also lost his spouse. Without his wife to help raise his children, he lapsed into alcoholism and became horribly abusive to his children; after he hit young Jeffrey with a belt, Rose immediately took her grandchildren as far away from their father as she could even though it pained her to never want to see her own son again.

Rose often mentions her old beau Stanley Perkins, a dancer whom she met before Burt. Eventually, Stanley (William Schallert, 1922–2016) shows up and reenters her life and proposes to her on two occasions. The second time, Rose discovers she has a weak heart medical condition and won't be able to travel around like he does when he was a traveling salesman. When Stanley insists that his love for his "Miss Rose" is greater than his desire to wander, they marry and go on a honeymoon.

Toward the end of the series, with the events of the ensuing World War dominating even Virginia rural mountain life, Rose Burton Perkins returns to move in to help John Sr., nurse Mary Ellen (with John Curtis), factory / plant manager Erin, and young Elizabeth with the housekeeping and cooking while John-Boy, Jason, Ben, and Jim-Bob are away eventually at war (although sometimes initially on the home front).

The character of Rose briefly reappears in the 1993 reunion film and television special, A Walton Thanksgiving Reunion, (set two decades later in 1963), as an employee of Erin's former in-laws, the Northridge family. Husband Stanley Perkins is not mentioned, he most likely had died.

=== Dr. Curtis Willard (Curt) ===
Played by Tom Bower, in the episodes leading up to the fatal December 7, 1941 Attack on Pearl Harbor by the Imperial Japanese Navy. Curt comes to the community to replace longtime elder country physician Dr. Matthew Vance (Victor Izay), and besides alienating and upsetting everybody with his brusque, truthful, no-holds-barred style of bedside manners, he also quickly falls in love with Mary Ellen even after she at first takes an intense dislike to his methods and criticism of the cramped medical offices and equipment in the house offered to him (which she had earlier set up and arranged for old Dr. Vance's ways). So she hates him when she was engaged and just about to marry another Dr. David Spencer (Robert S. Woods, born 1948) from the hospital in the nearby county seat town of Rockfish, but breaks off the engagement at the last minute during the rehearsal and instead winds up with Curtis marrying her. He then becomes involved in the mountain community for several years in the series episodes during the late 1930s practicing medicine among the country folk, assisted by Mary Ellen studying as a nurse. Near the end of the series, Dr. Curt leaves the village when called up in the newly instituted military draft to service in the year preceding World War II (1939/1941-1945). Mary Ellen is later planning to head to Hawaii to be with Curt where he is assigned when the Japanese attack occurs in December 1941. Declared a military casualty in the attack, he later mysteriously shows up actually recovered and alive, (now played by second actor Scott Hylands, born 1943). After a visit to Virginia by his new girlfriend seeking information about his mysterious background. She tells that he is found living in Florida under another name of Curtis Packer, suffering from post-traumatic stress and physical war injuries when Mary Ellen desperately then visits him hoping to rekindle their marriage and be a father to their young son John Curtis Willard. But he refuses and tells her to move on.

== Recurring characters ==
=== Mamie Baldwin ===
The older of the Baldwin sisters, a pair of relatively well-off elderly spinster Southern belles, Mamie (pilot, Josephine Hutchinson, (1903–1998); series, Helen Kleeb, 1907–2003), is more sensible and grounded than her sister Emily. She and Emily live nearby in Judge Baldwin's distinctive Colonial era Georgian / Federal style architecture brick mansion with a neat, well-manicured lawn, untouched apparently from the Great Depression economic bad times in the early 1930s at the beginning of the series. They live a cultured relaxed lifestyle and carry on their "Papa's" (father's) legacy of making and distributing a product they refer to as "Papa's recipe" (or "The Recipe"), which they believe to be a harmless elixir, tonic and folk medicinal remedy, but which is in fact moonshine whiskey which they make using "Papa's machine" (a still). All the residents of Walton's Mountain are aware of the true nature of the Recipe, but rarely discuss it with the sisters or outsiders. Olivia and Grandma Walton, being devout tee-totaler Southern Baptists, along with Corabeth Godsey, disapprove of the sisters' production of alcohol and generally try to discourage the family's association with them early in the series. However, in later seasons the Walton women mellow and the Baldwin sisters become dear family friends, even taking in Jason as a houseguest in their luxurious home, following a devastating fire at the Waltons' home. In one episode later in the series Grandma Walton teaches Elizabeth how to bake and lets on that her secret for a particular cake tasting so good was using some of 'The Recipe' in the cake mix before she entered it in the county fair, and during the eighth season, when Miss Mamie is too afraid to undergo cataract eye surgery to restore her failing vision, Grandma helps to persuade her to have the surgery. Prohibition has been repealed early in Franklin Roosevelt's presidency, and though the operation of an unlicensed still (as well as the selling of untaxed alcohol) is technically illegal, Sheriff Ep Bridges considers the ladies' activities generally harmless as long as no one tries to sell the "Recipe" (which a couple of their unscrupulous relatives did try to do). Most of the other citizens of Walton's Mountain and the area are quite fond of the Baldwin sisters.

=== Emily Baldwin ===
Emily Baldwin (pilot episode / film: Dorothy Stickney, 1896–1998); in following series, Mary Jackson, 1910–2005) is the slightly more eccentric Baldwin Sister. As a young girl, she was in love with handsome Ashley Longworth, until he disappeared. This was due to her "Papa" / father's interference, of which Emily was unaware until decades later in her sixties. Though she has never heard from Ashley for some fifty years, she is convinced that he will someday return to her. In season seven, Ashley's son Ashley Jr. (Jonathan Frakes, born 1952), shows up at Walton's Mountain with news that his father has unfortunately died (but also that he really loved and cherished Miss Emily for the remainder of his life). Ashley Jr. begins a romance with Erin Walton, to Emily's delight, but reveals that, on account of his wartime experiences, is an atheist, and Erin, on the advice of her mother, Olivia, breaks off the relationship because of the religious differences.He returns after Erin is later involved with Paul Northridge, creating an uncomfortable love triangle, and forcing Erin to choose between the two suitors. (Erin ends up choosing later arrival Paul Northridge.)

=== Aimee Godsey ===
Aimee (17 episodes of the series (1976–79)), followed by reunion made-for-TV movies: A Walton Thanksgiving Reunion (1993), (with Rachel Longaker, born 1965); and then two subsequent films Mother's Day on Waltons Mountain and A Day for Thanks on Waltons Mountain, – (using DeAnna Robbins, born 1959), is the adopted blonde-haired daughter of Ike and Corabeth Godsey and becomes best friend of little Elizabeth Walton, youngest of the family. Aimee's birth parents died when she was young and the Godseys were planning to adopt a baby but the birth mother changed her mind at the last minute so they returned from the agency compelled to adopt her at age 10 when seeing her, after Corabeth had trouble earlier becoming pregnant herself. Corabeth tries to tailor Aimee into a proper little lady of culture and refinement even though she would rather be an ordinary country girl who enjoys the latest fashions and gets to adventure places. By season eight, her character no longer makes regular appearances on the show, and is said to have been placed in private school until returning in the first reunion movie (with original Longaker), and portrayed by a different actress (Robbins) in two more films. In the fourth reunion movie, it comes to light in the plot that Aimee disobeyed her mother's wishes and got involved with someone she considered to be a ruffian, leading to many years of estrangement between the two of them. However, Aimee eventually returns to Walton's Mountain now married to this man, with a baby, and the sight of her new grandchild is enough to touch Corabeth's heart and mend the rift between them, having admitted her mistake about the separation.

=== Rev. Matthew Fordwick ===
First appearing early in the first season ("The Sinner"), Rev. Matthew Fordwick (John Ritter, 1948–2003), comes to the community fresh from Southern Baptist Convention seminary trained as a hardline Biblical strict legalist and fundamentalist, until he accidentally gets himself drunk on the infamous "The Recipe" at a visit with the Baldwin sisters, who happen to be his distant cousins. This humbling incident and several other learning experiences causes him to adopt a more forgiving nature, and he comes to serve as the pastor of the local Baptist church through season five. He later courts then marries the local schoolteacher, Rosemary Hunter (Mariclare Costello), in season four, and they welcome a daughter, Mary Margaret, in season five.

=== Rosemary Hunter Fordwick ===
Miss Hunter (Mariclare Costello, 1936–2026) is Walton's Mountain's schoolteacher, teaching all ages from first grade through high school in a wood-frame one-room schoolhouse. As such, she teaches nearly all the area's children, including all of the Walton kids. She is one of the first people to recognize his talents, and encourage John-Boy to pursue his writing, suggesting he submit his essays to various competitions or magazines, and helping him prepare for college. She later marries the newly arrived Baptist minister, the Rev. Matthew Fordwick (John Ritter). Together, they have a daughter named Mary Margaret, named after Mary Ellen Walton, who assisted in the delivery.

=== Verdie Grant Foster ===
Verdie Grant (Lynn Hamilton, 1930–2025), is a middle-aged African-American widow (née Harris), with two adult sons and three daughters, the youngest of whom, Claire, is graduating from college in the state capital Richmond, and later suffers a failed marriage for her education. She has been illiterate most of her life, a fact which her fierce pride and mistrust based on bad experience with a white-dominated society has caused her to hide. But she decides to ask John-Boy to secretly teach her to read and write. After resolution of a misunderstanding caused by Elizabeth unknowingly revealing her secret to local school teacher Miss Hunter, she completes her lessons and becomes a close friend of the Waltons, appearing in a total of 17 episodes. During later seasons, she marries Harley Foster (Hal Williams, 1938-2026), an itinerant laborer nearby (who it is later revealed was on the run trying to avoid conviction for a murder which he had not committed) and becomes stepmother to Harley's young son. The other of her sons, Josh, was an orphan who wandered onto Walton's mountain and the Fosters fell in love with and adopted. After her father died before she could ask him about his past, Verdie discovered an ornamental necklace among his belongings, sparking a desire to learn more about her heritage and ancestry, despite her husband's warnings not to pry into the ugliness of a bygone time. Because of the flood that hit the mountains years ago, she nearly lost the trail of her ancestry when records about her grandparents were nearly all destroyed. Verdie discovered they were both plague victims and her grandfather's involvement with slavery. Her search finally led her to the Unwin estate, where she found out that family once owned hers as slaves and the ornament belonged to her great-grandfather Seth Edu, who was renamed Randolph Harris and brought over from Africa. Verdie resolved to one day trace her family back to its roots, and if she couldn't, she would have her children take over in her place.

=== Sheriff Ep Bridges ===
Marmaduke Ephram ("Ep") Bridges (in the pilot, David Huddleston, 1930–2016 was the first sheriff; in the series, longtime earlier Western films and television character actor John Crawford, 1920–2010) is the Sheriff of fictional Jefferson County, Virginia, keeper of the peace in Walton's Mountain, the nearby county seat town of Rockfish and surrounding hills. He appeared in forty episodes, starting in the very first. He, like John Walton Sr. and Ike Godsey, is a veteran of the First World War (1914/1917-1918), serving in the 2nd Infantry Division. After the Great War, he married but became widowed, and has two grown sons. Though he is unquestionably the best man in the county for the sheriff's job, he needs the occasional help of John-Boy's investigative journalism on his Blue Ridge Chronicle paper to survive a re-election threat from a charismatic, well-connected politician looking to use the office as a stepping stone to the state legislature. He refuses to discuss his war service until John-Boy researches for an "Honor Day" celebration and discovers that Ep was decorated for valor with the congressional Medal of Honor, the French Croix de Guerre, and several others on the infamous Western Front trench warfare for destroying an enemy German machine gun nest with a grenade, wounding himself in the process. He was haunted by the deaths he caused. John-Boy's research reunites Ep with Sara Griffith (Lynn Carlin, born 1938), a volunteer Army and Red Cross nurse and ambulance driver in France who treated him for his wounds, but lost touch with him when he was transferred to another military hospital. Not long after the reunion, Ep and Sara marry. Sheriff Bridges makes his last appearance in the penultimate episode of the series, "The Hostage" (season 9, episode 20) in 1981.

=== Sara Griffith Bridges ===
Sara Griffith (Lynn Carlin, born 1938) is an American Red Cross nurse working in the state capital of Richmond, Virginia, to whom Blue Ridge Chronicle newspaper editor / publisher John-Boy turns to research Ep Bridges' World War I service record. It happens that she also served in World War I on its tragic Western Front in France, and is coincidentally amazingly personally familiar with Ep Bridge's service because she treated him after he was wounded back then. They started a brief courting relationship, but lost touch for the last two decades when Ep was transferred to another military hospital. After hearing about John-Boy's story and inquiries and with learning his current occupation and whereabouts, Sarah visits Walton's Mountain to find Ep, and soon relocates there. After a bit of matchmaking by an amused Olivia and John, a shy Ep finally proposes and they marry. Her war experience as an ambulance driver gave her a knowledge of mechanical know-how and of how to fix cars, which earns her Jim-Bob's adoration. She, along with Olivia and Corabeth, serves the local little Baptist church as part of a committee appointed to find a replacement pastor for Reverend Matthew Fordwick (John Ritter).

=== Maude Gormley ===
Maude (Merie Earle, 1889–1984), was an elderly sparky vivacious woman who resided on Waltons Mountain. A talented folk artist, she discovered an artistic talent late in life, and began painting local scenes on pieces of plywood (which were later displayed as folk art and sold in Ike's general store). Though a bit of a schemer, she nonetheless enjoyed a warm friendship with the Walton clan, particularly grandma Esther, whom she'd known for many decades.

=== G.W. Haines ===
George William "G.W." (David Doremus, born 1957) is a very soft-spoken, somewhat naive boy who grows into a well-versed gentleman and a kindhearted friend to the Waltons. Initially, he shows an interest in Mary Ellen, but this later tapers away when both of them find complacency as remaining simple friends. Later, G.W.'s attentions fall on Erin as she matures, and this time he falls in love. However, by then, the outbreak of World War II has led him to join the Army, and places him in a troubling environment with many men who are sexually active and act crude and indecently around Erin as he tries to date her while upholding respect and civility where none can be found. G.W. resolves to confess his love for Erin and begin a serious relationship with her, perhaps the first one Erin was privileged to have organically transpire without it being forced upon her abruptly.

Sadly, a disastrous fate befalls G.W. when his kind heart gets the better of him in the season 6 episode "The First Casualty", as he prepared to go into active service. His regiment had been conducting a training exercise with dummy grenades, but for once, switched to live grenades. After pulling the pin on his grenade and preparing to throw it, a wild rabbit emerged onto the training field, right in the area where G.W. was about to lob it. G.W. hesitated for a moment so he could change his trajectory, but the grenade's explosive contents were primed and the time he needed to get the grenade away from himself was lost. As G.W. tossed it up in the air, it exploded too close to him and killed him instantly. His parents were forced to bury him in a way that no one, not even him, had expected, and Erin mourned him deeply. She cried for him both in his death, and after reading a posthumous letter he had prepared for her to receive in case he died in the war, where he told Erin he really loved her, which she reciprocated. Although G.W.'s sudden death haunted Erin, she was comforted by her father in her time of need.

G.W. became unfortunately the very first resident of the Walton's Mountain community to die as a result of wartime casualties, and the first recurring regular character in the television franchise to be killed off. Older Erin fondly remembers him in part two of "The Empty Nest" episode, remarking that her now-deceased grandpa Zeb is up in Heaven with G.W. and now both will be watching over her.

=== Flossie Brimmer ===
A heavyset, widowed woman (Nora Marlowe, 1915–1977) who runs the boarding house in the village of Walton's Mountain. Flossie has the ability to tell people's fortunes with tea leaves, and stood watch over the youngest Walton children during the family's earlier frequent childbirths that required them to stay out of mischief. In the episode, "The Fire Storm", from the fifth season, when John Boy arouses controversy by reprinting passages in his local newspaper from dictator Adolf Hitler's book Mein Kampf, her ability to speak German is pivotal to stopping a staged anti-Nazi symbolic book-burning begun by the misguided Rev. Matthew Fordwick. She prevents the citizens of the Blue Ridge from unknowingly incinerating a book simply because it is printed in German when John Boy plucks it up out of the pile when she identifies it as the Bible, via translated interpretation when reading the first verses from the Book of Genesis, causing the entire community to realize with great horror that some Germans actually valued what they did and their actions nearly copied Nazism. Two decades earlier, she and her late husband were recent immigrants from overseas in Europe and they suffered strong anti-German prejudice, persecution and hysteria during the time of the First World War when German language was discouraged, newspapers closed and other things from the then enemy German Empire were changed, plus occasional attacks on innocent recent immigrants. She was the second recurring regular cast member to unfortunately die, following the sudden death of her portraying actress, Nora Marlowe, in late 1977. Her character is not mentioned and later written out of the series narrative at the same time as grandfather Zebulon Walton / Will Geer, having died a short time later.

=== Zuleika Dunbar ===
An older woman played by Pearl Shear (1918–2009), a plump bright blonde-haired vivacious resident at Flossie Brimmer's boarding house, and known for being a flirt to any of the male boarders, who enjoys especially the telling a good story. She is a constant rival for Zeb's affections, with his occasional visits and her presence annoys jealous Esther. She takes over running the village boarding house not long after Mrs Brimmer's death.

=== Yancy Tucker ===
Played by Robert Donner (1931–2006). An all-around handyman but disorganized free-spirit who lived in a remote messy tumble-down shack, filled with his menagerie of assorted wild and partly domesticated animals. He appears in 19 episodes. "The Sinner" and "The Dust Bowl Cousins" in 1972; "The Deed" and "The Chicken Thief" in 1973; "The Heritage" in 1974, "The Shivaree" in 1975; "The Best Christmas", "The Wedding: Parts 1 and 2", "The Baptism", "The Comeback", "The Quilting" and "The Burnout" in 1976. "The First Casualty" in 1977, with the death of local boy "G.W." Haines while training in the military, is also the episode in which he finally marries waitress / barmaid Sissy Walker Tucker (Cissy Wellman, born 1943) who's been chasing and flirting with him for a long while from the local dive / roadhouse, the Dew Drop Inn. Then also that same season / year in "The Grandchild", and "The Hawk" in 1977; "The Boosters", "The Beau" and "The Obsession" in 1978. Donner also later again portrayed neer' do well Yancy in two reunion movies, “A Day for Thanks on Walton's Mountain" (1982) and a decade later in "A Walton Thanksgiving Reunion" (1993); in the latter, Yancy then works with budding pilot Jim-Bob Walton at the local airport.

=== J.D. Pickett ===
Jefferson Davis Pickett (Lewis Arquette 1935–2001), is the owner of a new local metal products factory that Erin Walton worked. First as a clerk, then indispensable secretary and soon manager by the beginning of World War II. He was a harsh, stern sometimes whining personality but a softie at heart when pressured, but also incompetent man, always wanting things done a certain way until Erin rescues him. He appeared in 11 episodes from 1978 to 1981.

=== Drew Cutler ===
Drew (Tony Becker, born 1963), was first introduced in season 8 as a high school student and friend for Elizabeth. He later works at the Waltons' sawmill and dates Elizabeth. He appeared in 8 episodes from 1980 to 1981 and in 5 of the 1982 to 1997 movies.

=== Rev. Tom Marshall ===
The new Baptist pastor, Tom Marshall (Kip Niven, 1945–2019) first appeared in the season 9 episode, "The Beginning" several years / seasons after the departure of the earlier Rev. Matthew Fordwick. He causes quite a stir among the surrounding residents of the little hamlet when he breaks into the neglected and boarded up church and to announce his unexpected arrival, starts to ring the steeple bell vigorously in the middle of the night awakening everyone around Walton's Mountain. Later Corabeth attempted to set him up with dating several eligible young women and causes him to realize that he needed to marry and so he leaves and returns married to Doris (Joanna Kerns). He appeared in three episodes in season 9 and two of the 1982 reunion movies.

== Other characters ==
=== Judge Baldwin ===
The late father of the Baldwin ladies, who is only ever seen in the form of an oil painting portrait above their parlor fireplace, one of many Baldwins to harbor a distinctive infamous recipe for bootleg whiskey, and the keeper of a hidden secret room where he stashed his still and documented organized annual stores of his own brew batches from the earlier Prohibition era and years before, which his daughters later discovered decades later by accident near the end of the series in the mid-1930s. "Papa" Baldwin is said to have suffered a stroke at some moment earlier in mid-life with his declining health and spent the remaining 20 years of his life somewhat vegetated and walking with a cane that is later given by his daughters to grandma Esther following her later stroke and return from extensive hospitalization. He was fiercely against the idea of Ashley Longworth getting involved with his daughter Emily and served to quash their relationship a half-century before, in more ways than one. When Emily discovered a note hidden in the back of his portrait reveling in his disgust at his daughter's chosen beau, she "punished" her father by evicting his portrait from its honored position over the fireplace where it had hung for decades and temporarily gave him a "time-out" exile in the broom closet. Judge Baldwin is widely recognized by the older community of Walton's Mountain and Jefferson County for his occupation and prestige, as well as his advocacy of "The Recipe", which disturbs Corabeth, Esther and Olivia to no end whenever their menfolk indulge occasionally. In contrast, his late wife is seldom mentioned by his daughters, as their father's personality legacy was so prolific, overwhelming and authoritative on them compared to their mother, who led a relatively quiet parallel life of hobbies.

=== Benjamin ("Uncle" Ben) Walton ===
Uncle Ben Walton was the red-haired, idea-filled older son of Zebulon Tyler Walton and Esther Walton. He is mentioned in "The Awakening" (season 2, episode 15), in which three children of Zeb and Esther are mentioned, and "The Hero" (season 5, episode 18) when the younger Ben made a memorial bench for Uncle Ben for Honor Day.

Uncle Ben was much like his nephew, John Sr.’s son. They both have red hair, they are both filled with ideas, and their handwriting is similar. Ben got along with John the same way that Ben gets along with John-Boy.

=== Frances Daly ===
Frances is Olivia's sister, who lives in nearby Edgemont, Virginia. She is mentioned in "The Heritage" (season 2, episode 18).

=== Olivia Hill ===
Olivia Hill (Deborah White) is Olivia Walton's namesake (she is daughter of Olivia's deceased childhood best friend Marnie), and is the wife and later widow of Bob Hill, whom she marries on the mountain in the longtime traditional post-marriage "The Shivaree" episode. Catastrophe strikes both her family and her husband's family, as both she and Bob have no surviving parents, and they ended up seeing each other before their wedding, said to be bad luck. This turns out to be strangely prophetic when Olivia is reduced to a bereaved widow barely a year later. She returns to Walton's Mountain following her husband's sudden death in "The Loss." Bob is said to have been struck by a car a dark night on his way home when he didn't see it coming.

=== Martha Corinne Walton ===
Martha Corinne, the widow of Zeb's older brother, Henry Walton, first appears in the two-part season three episode "The Conflict", in which she and her family are displaced from their ancient log cabin on the scenic mountain-top land by construction of the famous north–south Blue Ridge Parkway through the Appalachian Mountains chain as one of the "New Deal" program projects of President Franklin D. Roosevelt's administration. Though she initially refuses to leave, when John-Boy is wounded in an armed standoff between members of the Walton clan and government officials, Martha Corinne agrees to relocate to a newly constructed small wood-frame house provided by the government. She appears in two more episodes, including season five's "The Pony Cart." (which won an Emmy TV award for her portrayer, longtime actress Beulah Bondi (1888–1981), in 1977). It was in this episode she made her final appearance. Martha Corrine reveals to John-Boy that her health has started deteriorating mentioning to John-Boy about her occasional heart angina when he drives her by to see the site of their old log cabin and small family grave plots in the woods off the newly constructed Parkway and she had come back to her mountain to make her peace, giving special little trinkets to each family member plus old family photographs and memorabilia to him while telling old family stories of their first arrival in Virginia in 1810. Later, before she eventually passes away smelling a flower bed off the road after Ben rides her in the rebuilt wooden pony cart / shay that he and Zeb worked on and restored so Martha Corinne could paint her folk art of exquisite flowery designs on the sides.

=== Boone Walton ===
Played by Morgan Woodward (1925–2019). A member of the Walton clan, and Zeb's nephew (the son of brother Henry and his wife Martha Corrine Walton – Beulah Bondi, 1888–1981), who had a major role in the standoff with the Blue Ridge Parkway construction. Boone Walton is very set in his ways and has a cantankerous disposition. He first appears in the two-part season three episode "The Conflict," and is happy with Uncle Zeb's involvement in the fight against the government officials. He backs down once John-Boy is shot. He returns later in the season seven episode "The Moonshiner," where he has been arrested for moonshining and faces imprisonment. Great-nephew Jason Walton appears in court at his sentencing and appeals his case, getting the judge to place Boone in his care after paying off a $100 fine, allowing him to connect with Boone. The rest of his family shows a strong distaste for Boone (due to his role in getting John-Boy injured), especially Esther, who despises his free-spirit mountain lifestyle. He slowly adjusts among them and manages to restore the Baldwins' Recipe when they lose the means to recreate it from memory. Boone reveals to Jason that he once had a wife named Rose and a young son, but a freak flash flood took their lives. Although Boone stubbornly resists progress and continues to rebel, he reforms himself in the end. However, he remains an ardent moonshiner for the rest of his days in the mountains until one fateful night several years later in 1943, aged 85, when he treks out into civilization with two jugs of moonshine in hand and dies crossing the road in the dark (implied to possibly be drunk), where he is hit by an oncoming car.

=== Sarah Simmonds ===
Sarah Jane Simmonds is an overly protected young girl being raised by her widowed mother. When John-Boy asks her out on a date to go see a movie it releases a wild streak that results in a close brush with death for Sarah. Played by Sissy Spacek (born 1949), in one of her first television roles.
