= Living Proof: The Hank Williams Jr. Story =

1983 television film

- Genre: Biography; Drama; Music
- Written by: Stephen Kandel; I. C. Rapoport
- Directed by: Dick Lowry
- Starring: Richard Thomas; Lenora May
- Music by: Bill Conti
- Country of origin: United States
- Original language: English

Production
- Executive producer: Richard Thomas
- Producers: Michael Lepiner; Bruce S. Pustin
- Cinematography: Robert M. Baldwin
- Editors: Nancy Kanter; Craig McKay
- Running time: 89 min.
- Production companies: Melpimene Productions; Procter & Gamble Productions (PGP); Telecom Entertainment Inc.

Original release
- Network: NBC
- Release: March 7, 1983

Living Proof: The Hank Williams Jr. Story is a 1983 American made-for-television biographical film directed by Dick Lowry and starring Richard Thomas. The plot roughly follows the semi-autobiographical book Living Proof by Michael Bane and Hank Williams Jr., which tells how Hank Jr. nearly killed himself trying to escape his famous father's shadow, in order start a music career based on his own talent. The film's score was composed and conducted by Bill Conti.

Leonard Maltin's TV Movies and Video Guide rates the film as being above average.

== Plot ==
Starting when Hank Jr. was eight-years-old his mother Audrey had him on concert stages singing his famous father’s songs. When Hank became a young man Audrey continued to control his life, so he became estranged from her, but continued touring, still singing his father’s songs. He was encouraged by Merle, who later became his manager.

Hank began abusing drugs and alcohol. He was engaged to Lisa, but was perpetually unfaithful to her. He began adding some of his original songs to his concerts, but audiences reacted negatively, and only wanted to hear his father’s music. Hank married June, but they divorced a few years later.

He recorded an album of his own songs in Alabama, for he wanted to distance himself from Nashville. He began dating Becky, who had recently stopped seeing someone she'd been romantically involved with, so the couple did not rush into a long-term relationship.

Hank went mountain climbing, but fell a long distance and was severely injured. His face, including one of his eyes, was badly damaged, and when Hank looked in a mirror he was horrified at his appearance. He required physical therapy, and when Merle left a guitar for him Hank smashed it, for he was no longer interested in music.

Hank wanted to be alone, so went to a remote cabin. Merle came to see him, and left a guitar on the cabin porch. Becky visited Hank, and told him she didn’t care about his physical appearance.

In the end Hank returned to concert touring, playing his own music. He grew a beard, wore big sunglasses and a cowboy hat to hide his facial scaring, and to protect his weakened eye. Audiences were enthusiastic over the musician he'd become.

== Cast ==
- Richard Thomas as Hank Williams Jr.
- Lenora May as Lisa
- Liane Langland as June Bradshaw Williams
- Ann Gillespie as Becky
- Merle Kilgore as himself
- Clu Gulager as J.R. Smith
- Allyn Ann McLerie as Audrey Williams
- Barton Heyman as Bobby Deane
- Noble Willingham as Dr. Graham
- Jay O. Sanders as Dick Willey
- Christian Slater as Walt Willey
