= Richard Thomas (actor) =

American actor (born 1951)

Colonel Richard Thomas
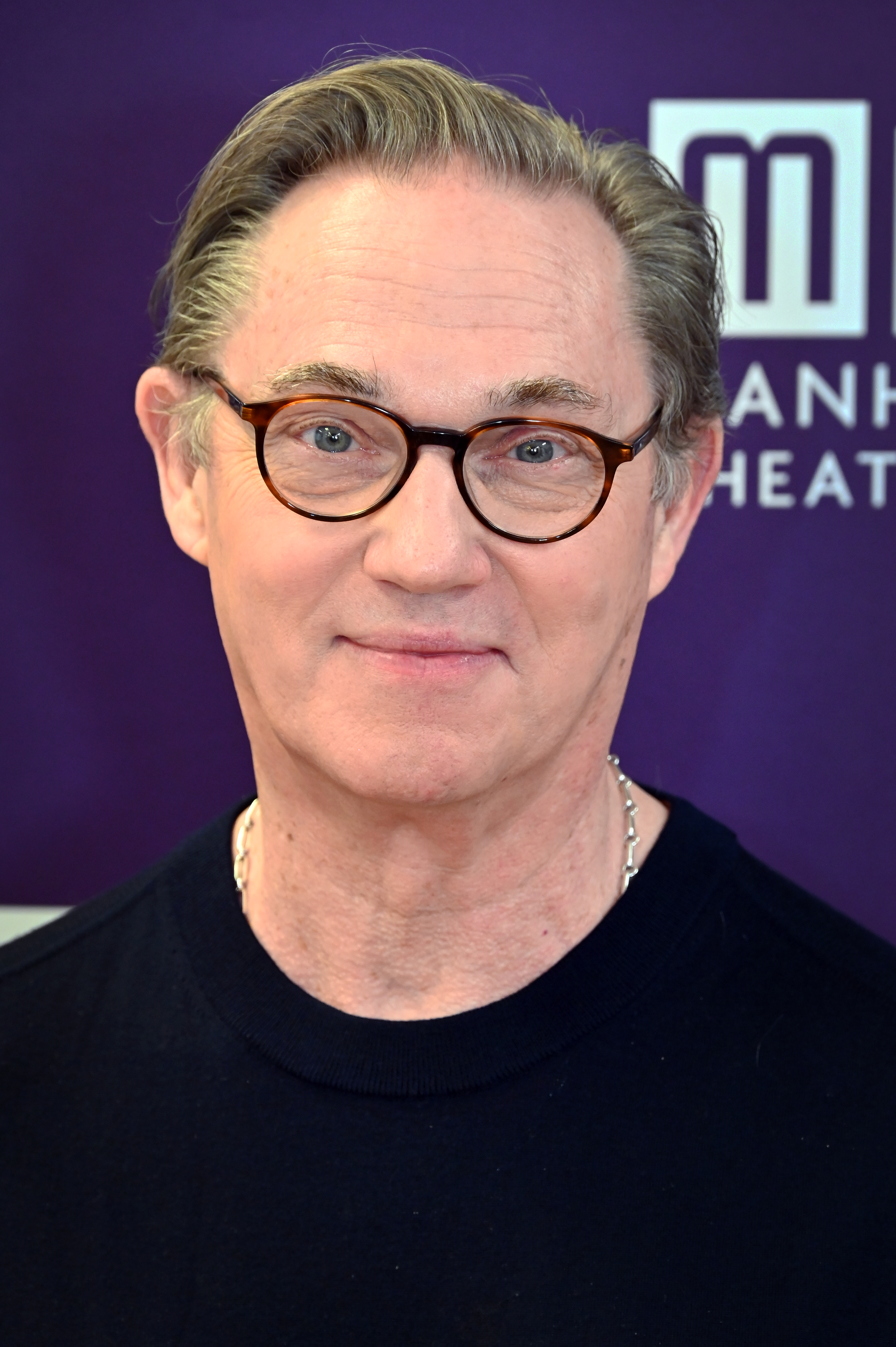
- Thomas in 2026
- Born: Richard Earl Thomas; June 13, 1951 (age 75); New York City, New York, U.S.
- Education: Columbia University (attended)
- Occupations: Actor; producer
- Years active: 1958–present
- Spouses: Alma Gonzales (m. 1975; div. 1993); Georgiana Bischoff (m. 1994)
- Children: 7
- Parents: Richard Thomas (father); Barbara Fallis (mother)

Richard Earl Thomas (born June 13, 1951) is an American actor. He is best known for his leading role as budding author "John-Boy" Walton on the CBS historical drama series The Waltons (1972–1977), for which he received the Primetime Emmy Award for Outstanding Lead Actor, in addition to two Golden Globe Award nominations.

Thomas later starred as Bill Denbrough in the television miniseries adaptation of Stephen King's It (1990), played Special Agent Frank Gaad on FX's spy thriller series The Americans (2013–2016), and appeared as Nathan Davis on the Netflix crime drama series Ozark (2022). On stage, Thomas portrayed Atticus Finch in the 2022–2024 national tour of To Kill a Mockingbird and was nominated for the Tony Award for Best Featured Actor in a Play for his work as Elliot Emerson in The Balusters (Broadway, 2026). His feature film credits include Last Summer (1969), You'll Like My Mother (1972), Battle Beyond the Stars (1980), and Wonder Boys (2000).

== Early life and education ==
Thomas was born on June 13, 1951, in Manhattan, the son of Barbara Fallis and Richard S. Thomas. His parents were dancers with the New York City Ballet and owned the New York School of Ballet.

Thomas has a birthmark on his left cheek. He has stated that this led to his rejection for a role in a television commercial in his youth.

Thomas was educated at two private day schools for boys, first at Allen-Stevenson School, and then at the now-defunct McBurney School, both in his home district of Manhattan, New York City.

He was a student at Columbia College, the undergraduate college of Columbia University, where he majored in Chinese before switching to the English department. After he landed the role in The Waltons, he left Columbia during his junior year to commit to the role full-time in Los Angeles.

== Acting career ==
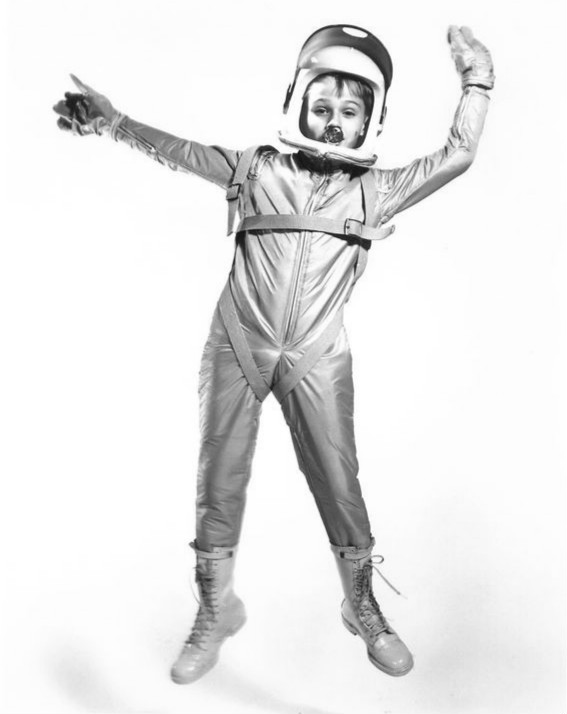
Thomas at age 10 in 1, 2, 3 Go!

In 1958, at age seven, Thomas made his Broadway debut in Sunrise at Campobello. In 1959, he appeared in the Hallmark Hall of Fame NBC television presentation of Ibsen's A Doll's House with Julie Harris, Christopher Plummer, and Hume Cronyn. He then began acting in daytime TV, appearing in soap operas such as The Edge of Night (as Ben Schultz, 1961), A Flame in the Wind and As the World Turns (as Tom Hughes, 1966–67) which were broadcast from his native Manhattan. In 1970, he guest starred in NBC's Bonanza ("The Weary Willies").

Thomas's first major film roles were in the auto racing drama Winning (1969) with Paul Newman and the coming-of-age story Last Summer (also 1969) with Bruce Davison, Barbara Hershey, and Catherine Burns.

In 1971 Thomas appeared in The Todd Killings, a psychological thriller released by National General Pictures, directed by Barry Shear, and co-starring Robert F. Lyons, Belinda Montgomery and Barbara Bel Geddes, based on the true crimes of serial killer Charles Schmid. Also in 1971, he starred in Red Sky at Morning, reuniting him with Last Summer co-star Catherine Burns, and played the lead in the independent production Cactus in the Snow.

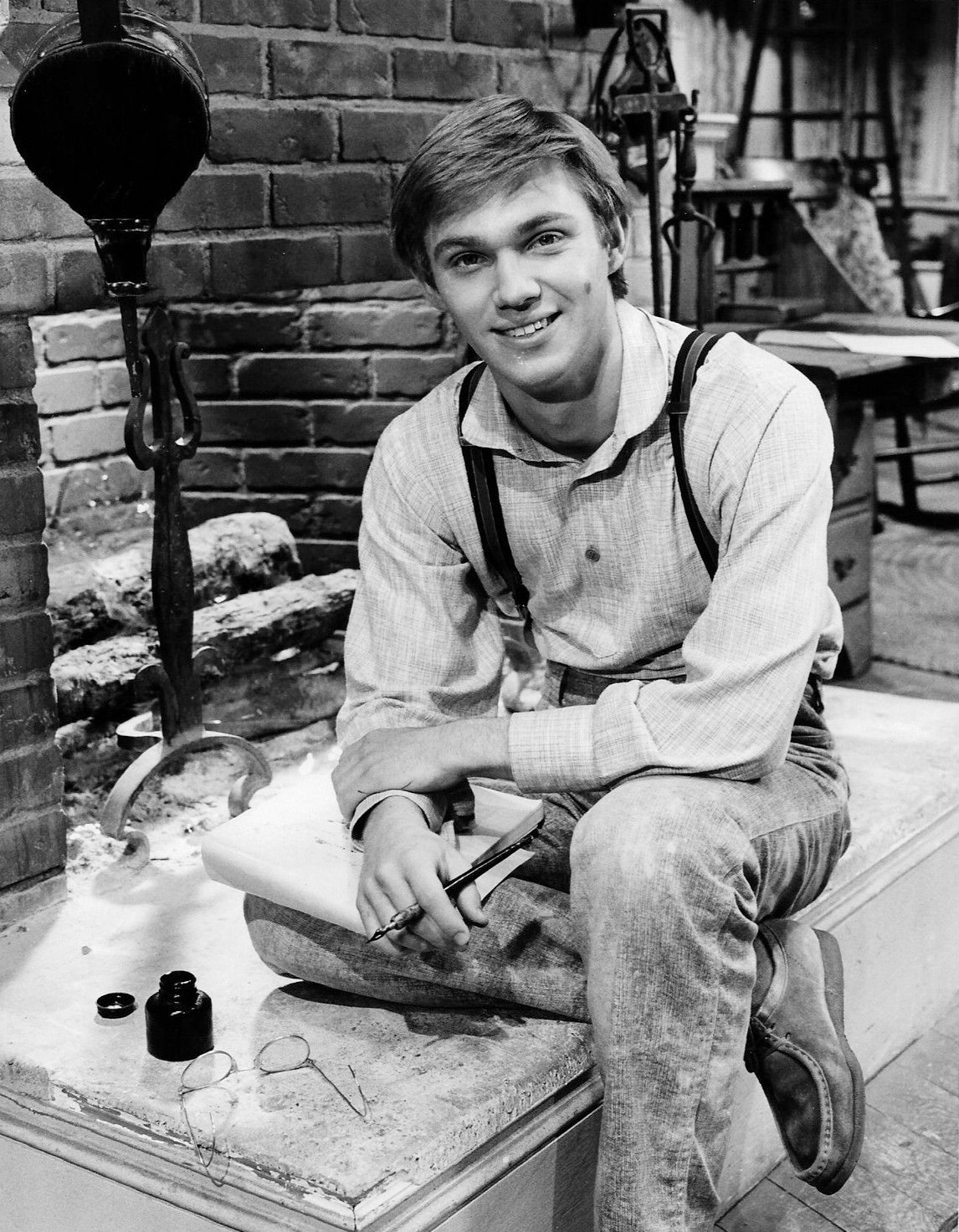
Thomas on the set of The Waltons in 1973

Beginning in 1972, Thomas became recognized worldwide for his portrayal of John-Boy Walton in the TV series The Waltons, based on the life story of writer Earl Hamner, Jr. He appeared in the original CBS television film The Homecoming: A Christmas Story in 1971, which inspired the commissioning of the otherwise largely recast series, The Waltons, and then played the role of John-Boy Walton continuously in 122 episodes. In March 1977, Thomas left the series and his role was taken over by Robert Wightman. However, Thomas returned to the role in three Waltons TV movies in the 1990s, including A Walton Thanksgiving Reunion in 1993. Thomas won an Emmy Award for Best Actor in a Dramatic Series in 1973.

Thomas played against type as murderer and rapist Kenneth Kinsolving in You'll Like My Mother in 1972 with Patty Duke. He played the lead roles of Private Henry Fleming in the NBC TV movie The Red Badge of Courage in 1974 and Paul Bäumer in the 1979 CBS TV movie on All Quiet on the Western Front.

In other TV films, he played Col. Warner's younger son Jim in Roots: The Next Generations (the 1979 sequel to 1977's Roots), the title role in the biopic Living Proof: The Hank Williams Jr. Story in 1983, Will Mossup in CBS's Hobson's Choice in 1983, Henry Durie in The Master of Ballantrae for Hallmark Hall of Fame, Martin Campbell in Final Jeopardy, and the adult Bill Denbrough in the 1990 television mini-series It, adapted from Stephen King's horror novel.

In 1980, Thomas made his first Broadway appearance in more than 12 years when he was a replacement in Lanford Wilson's Fifth of July. In the same year, he appeared as Shad (the young farmer entrusted to employ mercenaries to save his planet from Sador and his invading forces) in Battle Beyond the Stars.

In 1987, he appeared on stage in Philadelphia and Washington, D.C., in the one-man tour-de-force Citizen Tom Paine (playing Paine "like a star-spangled tiger, ferocious about freedom and ready to savage anyone who stands in his way," in a staging of Howard Fast's play set in the bicentennial year of the United States Constitution). In 1990, he joined with Nathan Lane at the Mark Taper Forum in Los Angeles for Terrence McNally's The Lisbon Traviata in the role of Stephan. In 1992 he played the role of Gary Brown on the film A Thousand Heroes the disaster of United Airlines flight 232, in 1993, he played the title role in a Shakespeare Theater stage production of Richard II in Washington, D.C.

Thomas starred in the ABC TV movie Death in Small Doses, directed by Sondra Locke. He starred with Maureen O'Hara and his It co-star Annette O'Toole in the Hallmark Channel movie The Christmas Box in 1995.

Thomas appeared in a quartet of performances at the Hartford Stage in Connecticut including Hamlet (1987), Peer Gynt (1989), Richard III (1994) and Tiny Alice (1996). In 1997 and 1998, he played degenerate Joe Greene in two episodes of Touched by an Angel and four episodes of Promised Land.

In 2001, he appeared in London's West End in a theatre production of Yasmina Reza's Art with Judd Hirsch. He also appeared on the New York stage in The Public Theater's production in Central Park of As You Like It in 2005, Michael Frayn's Democracy on Broadway in 2004, and the Primary Stages' off-Broadway production of Terrence McNally's The Stendhal Syndrome in the same year.

He hosted the PAX TV series It's a Miracle. He starred in the series Just Cause in 2003 for the PAX TV network.

In 2005, he appeared in the Richard Greenburg Broadway debut of A Naked Girl on the Appian Way.

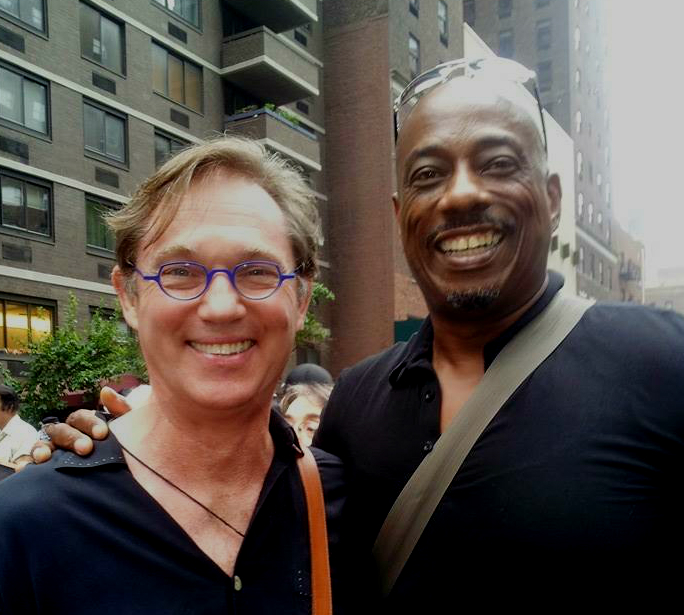
Thomas with singer Stacey Robinson in 2014

In 2006, Thomas began an American theater tour of Reginald Rose's play Twelve Angry Men along with Cheers star George Wendt at the Shubert Theater in New Haven, Connecticut, playing the pivotal role of Juror Eight opposite Wendt's Juror One.

In 2009 and 2010, Thomas was featured on Broadway in Race, a play by David Mamet. The production was directed by Mamet and included James Spader, David Alan Grier, and Kerry Washington. In February and March 2011, he starred at the off-Broadway New York Public Theater in Timon of Athens.

Thomas played Frank Gaad in the FX Network period spy drama television series The Americans which debuted in January 2013.

Thomas appeared in the 2017 Broadway revival of The Little Foxes and was nominated for a 2017 Tony Award for Best Featured Actor in a Play.

In December 2018, Thomas portrayed Ebenezer Scrooge in Pittsburgh CLO's production of A Musical Christmas Carol.

In February 2021, Thomas portrayed Bodie Lord in the Amazon thriller drama television series Tell Me Your Secrets, appearing in episode 5.

In January 2022, Thomas portrayed Wendy Byrde's estranged father, Nathan Davis, in three episodes of season 4 of the Netflix series Ozark.

Starting in April 2022, Thomas starred as Atticus Finch in a National Broadway tour of a stage production of Harper Lee's novel To Kill a Mockingbird.

In 2024, Thomas played Professor Webb in Thornton Wilder's play Our Town, with Jim Parsons and Katie Holmes.

In 2025, Richard Thomas played Mark Twain in a national touring revival of Hal Holbrook's Mark Twain Tonight.

== Personal life ==
Thomas married Alma Gonzales in 1975. In 1976, they had a son. Triplet daughters were born in 1981. Thomas and Gonzales divorced in 1993.

Thomas married Santa Fe art dealer Georgiana Bischoff on November 20, 1994 and their son was born in 1996. Richard adopted Bischoff's two daughters who were from previous marriages. Thomas and Bischoff currently reside in New York.

Thomas is a Kentucky Colonel. He is an Episcopalian and is on the Advisory Board of the Episcopal Actors Guild.

== Filmography ==
=== Film ===
Year	Title	Role	Notes
1969	Winning	Charley	
1969	Last Summer	Peter	
1971	Red Sky at Morning	Joshua Arnold	
1971	The Todd Killings	Billy Roy	
1971	Cactus in the Snow	Harley MacIntosh	aka You Can't Have Everything or Soldier Story
1972	You'll Like My Mother	Kenny Kinsolving	
1974	Sisters of the Space Age	Narrator	Short film
1977	September 30, 1955	Jimmy J.	
1980	Battle Beyond the Stars	Shad	
1999	Beyond the Prairie: The True Story of Laura Ingalls Wilder	Charles Ingalls	Video
2000	The Million Dollar Kid	Ted Hunter	
2000	Wonder Boys	Walter Gaskell	
2000	Bloodhounds Inc.	Robert Hunter	Video
2009	Taking Woodstock	Reverend Don Darren Pettie	
2015	Anesthesia	Mr. Werth	
2021	Christmas vs. the Walters	Roger	
2021	The Unforgivable	Michael Malcolm	
2021	Pennywise: The Story of It	Himself	Documentary film

=== Television films ===
Year	Title	Role	Notes
1959	A Doll's House	Ivor	
1971	The Homecoming: A Christmas Story	John-Boy Walton	
1974	The Red Badge of Courage	Pvt. Henry Fleming	
1975	The Silence	Cadet James Pelosi	
1978	Getting Married	Michael Carboni	
1979	No Other Love	Andrew Madison	
1979	All Quiet on the Western Front	Paul Bäumer	
1980	To Find My Son	David Benjamin	
1981	Berlin Tunnel 21	Lieutenant Sandy Mueller	
1981	Barefoot in the Park	Paul Bratter	
1982	Pavarotti & Friends	Himself	
1982	Johnny Belinda	William Richmond	
1982	Fifth of July	Kenneth Talley Jr.	
1982	Christmas at Kennedy Center with Leontyne Price	Himself	
1983	Living Proof: The Hank Williams, Jr. Story	Hank Williams Jr.	
1983	Hobson's Choice	Will Mossup	
1984	The Master of Ballantrae	Henry Durie	
1985	Final Jeopardy	Marty Campbell	
1988	Go Toward the Light	Greg Madison	
1989	Glory! Glory!	Rev. Bobby Joe	
1990	Andre's Mother	Cal Porter – Andre's Lover	
1990	Common Ground	Colin Diver	
1991	Mission of the Shark	Lieutenant Steven Scott	
1991	Yes, Virginia, There Is a Santa Claus	James O'Hanlan	
1992	A Thousand Heroes	Gary Brown	aka Crash Landing: The Rescue of Flight 232
1992	Lincoln	John Hay	Voice role
1993	I Can Make You Love Me	Richard Farley	aka Stalking Laura
1993	Precious Victims	Don Weber	
1993	Linda	Paul Cowley	
1993	A Walton Thanksgiving Reunion	John-Boy Walton	
1994	To Save the Children	David Young	
1995	Death in Small Doses	Richard Lyon	
1995	A Walton Wedding	John-Boy Walton	
1995	Down, Out & Dangerous	Tim Willows	
1995	The Christmas Box	Richard Evans	
1996	West Virginia: A Film History	Narrator	Voice role
1996	What Love Sees	Gordon Holly	
1996	Timepiece	Richard Evans	
1997	A Walton Easter	John-Boy Walton	
1997	A Thousand Men and a Baby	Dr. Hugh 'Bud' Keenan	aka Narrow Escape
1997	Flood: A River's Rampage	Herb Dellenbach	
1998	Big and Hairy	Victor Dewlap	
2000	In the Name of the People	Jack Murphy	
2000	The Christmas Secret	Jerry McNeil	
2001	The Miracle of the Cards	Dr. Neal Kassell	
2002	Beyond the Prairie, Part 2	Charles Ingalls	
2002	Anna's Dream	Rod Morgan	
2005	Annie's Point	Richard Eason	
2006	Wild Hearts	Bob	
2011	Yesterday, Today and Tomorrow	Dick	aka Time after Time
2021	The Waltons' Homecoming	John-Boy Walton (voice) / Host	
2022	A Waltons Thanksgiving	John-Boy Walton (voice) / Host	

=== Television series ===
Year	Title	Role	Notes
1961	Way Out	Jeremy Keeler	Episode: "The Croaker"
1961	Great Ghost Tales	Conradin	Episode: "Srendhi Vashtar"
1961	The Defenders	Johnny Remington	Episode: "The Boy Between"
1961	From These Roots	Richard	Unknown episodes
1961	The Edge of Night	Ben Schultz, Jr.	Unknown episodes
1961–1962	1, 2, 3 Go!	Himself	5 episodes
1964	A Flame in the Wind	Chris Austin	Episode: "#1.1"
1965	Seaway	Martin Anderson	Episode: "Last Voyage"
1966–1967	As the World Turns	Thomas Christopher Hughes #4	Unknown episodes
1969–1970	Marcus Welby, M.D.	Dennis Alan Graham	2 episodes
1970	Medical Center	Toby Tavormina	Episode: "Runaway"
1970	Bracken's World	Alan	Episode: "Fallen, Fallen Is Babylon"
1970	Bonanza	Billy	Episode: "The Weary Willies"
1971	The F.B.I.	John "Chill" Chilton	Episode: "The Game of Terror"
1972	Night Gallery	Ian Evans	Episode: "The Sins of the Fathers"
1972–1977	The Waltons	John-Boy Walton	124 episodes
1973	Match Game 73	Himself	5 episodes
1979	Roots: The Next Generations	Jim Warner	3 episodes
1989	The Greatest Adventure: Stories from the Bible	Mark	Episode: "The Easter Story"
1990	Tales from the Crypt	Dr. Trask	Episode: "Mute Witness to Murder"
1990	It	Bill Denbrough	2 episodes
1995	The Outer Limits	Dr. Stephen Ledbetter	Episode: "The New Breed"
1995	The Invaders	Jerry Thayer	2 episodes
1996	Dave's World	Himself	Episode: "L.A. Times"
1997–1998	Promised Land	Joe Greene	4 episodes
1997–1998	Touched by an Angel	Joe Greene	2 episodes
1997	Riding the Rails	Narrator	TV documentary
1998	The Adventures of Swiss Family Robinson	David Robinson	30 episodes
1999	The Practice	Walter Arens	Episode: "Committed"
1999–2001	It's a Miracle	Host	24 episodes
2001	Law & Order: Special Victims Unit	Daniel Varney	Episode: "Scourge"
2002–2003	Just Cause	Hamilton Whitney III	22 episodes
2006	Nightmares & Dreamscapes	Howard Cottrell	Episode: "Autopsy Room Four"
2009	Law & Order	Roger Jenkins	Episode: "Dignity"
2011	Rizzoli & Isles	Professor Dwayne Cravitz	Episode: "Rebel Without a Pause"
2013–2016	The Americans	Frank Gaad	41 episodes
2013	Law & Order: Special Victims Unit	Nat Randolph	Episode: "Brief Interlude"
2013	White Collar	William Wolcott	Episode: "Master Plan"
2014	The Good Wife	Ed Pratt	Episode: "Dear God"
2016	Chicago P.D.	Adam Ames	Episode: "A Night Owl"
2016	Elementary	Mitch Barrett	Episode: "Henny Penny the Sky is Falling"
2016	Conviction	Earl Slavitt	Episode: "A Different Kind of Death"
2017, 2019	Billions	Sanford Bensinger	3 episodes
2017	Blue Bloods	Congressman Richard Walters	Episode: "Ghosts of the Past"
2019	The Blacklist	David Foy	Episode: "The Third Estate"
2019–2020	NCIS: New Orleans	Deputy Director Van Cleef	2 episodes
2020	The Comey Rule	Chuck Rosenberg	2 episodes
2021	Tell Me Your Secrets	Bodie Lord	5 episodes
2022	Ozark	Nathan Davis	9 episodes
2026	Elsbeth	Lenny Smith	season 4 episode 2 "Death of a Playwright"

=== Stage ===
Year	Title	Role	Notes	Ref.
1958	Sunrise at Campobello	John Roosevelt	Cort Theatre, Broadway	
1963	Strange Interlude	Gordon Evans	Hudson Theatre, Broadway	
1964	Richard III	Young Prince Edward	New York Shakespeare Festival, Off-Broadway	
1965	The Playroom	Eric	Brooks Atkinson Theatre, Broadway	
1966	Richard III	Duke of York	New York Shakespeare Festival, Off-Broadway	
1967	Everything in the Garden	Roger	Plymouth Theatre, Broadway	
1980	Fifth of July	Kenneth Talley Jr. (Replacement)	New Apollo Theatre, Broadway	
1985	Citizen Tom Paine	Tom Paine	Williamstown Theatre Festival	
1986	The Front Page	Hildy Johnson	Vivian Beaumont Theatre, Broadway	
1987	Hamlet	Prince Hamlet	Hartford Stage	
1989	Peer Gynt	Peer Gynt	Hartford Stage	
1989	Love Letters	Andre Makepiece Ladd II (Replacement)	Edison Theatre, Broadway	
1990	The Lisbon Traviata	Stephen	Mark Taper Forum, Los Angeles	
1994	Richard III	Richard III	Hartford Stage	
2001	Art	Yvan	Wyndham's Theatre, London	
2004	The Stendhal Syndrome	The Conductor	Primary Stages, Off-Broadway	
2004	Democracy	Gunter Guillaume	Brooks Atkinson Theatre, Broadway	
2005	A Naked Girl on the Appian Way	Jeffrey Lapin	American Airlines Theatre, Broadway	
2005	As You Like It	Touchstone	Public Theatre, Off-Broadway	
2006	Twelve Angry Men	Juror Eight	National Tour	
2009	Race	Charles Strickland	Ethel Barrymore Theater, Broadway	
2011	Timon of Athens	Timon	Public Theater, Off-Broadway	
2012	An Enemy of the People	Peter Stockmann	Samuel J. Friedman Theatre, Broadway	
2012	Camp David	Jimmy Carter	Arena Stage, Washington DC	
2014	Camp David	Jimmy Carter	Old Globe Theatre, San Diego	
2015	You Can't Take It With You	Paul Sycamore (Replacement)	Longacre Theatre, Broadway	
2015	Incident at Vichy	Von Berg	Signautre Center, Off-Broadway	
2017	The Little Foxes	Horace Giddens	Samuel J. Friedman Theatre, Broadway	
2017	The Humans	Erik Blake	National Tour	
2018	A Musical Christmas Carol	Ebenezer Scrooge	Pittsburgh Civic Light Opera	
2019	The Great Society	Hubert Humphrey	Vivian Beaumont Theater, Broadway	
2022	To Kill A Mockingbird	Atticus Finch	National Tour	
2024	Our Town	Mr. Webb	Ethel Barrymore Theatre, Broadway	
2025	Mark Twain Tonight!	Mark Twain	National Tour	
2026	The Balusters	Elliot Emerson	Samuel J. Friedman Theatre, Broadway	

=== Producer ===
- Living Proof: The Hank Williams Jr. Story (1983) (executive producer)
- What Love Sees (1996) (co-producer)
- Summer of Fear (1996) (co-executive producer)
- For All Time (2000) (co-executive producer)
- Camping with Camus (2000) (producer)

=== Director ===
- The Waltons (5 episodes; 1975–1977)

== Awards and nominations ==
Year	Association	Category	Nominated work	Result
1973	Primetime Emmy Awards	Outstanding Lead Actor in a Drama Series	The Waltons	Won
1974	Primetime Emmy Awards	Outstanding Lead Actor in a Drama Series	The Waltons	Nominated
1974	Golden Globe Awards	Best Actor – Television Series Drama	The Waltons	Nominated
1975	Golden Globe Awards	Best Actor – Television Series Drama	The Waltons	Nominated
1990	CableACE Awards	Best Actor in a Movie or Miniseries	Glory! Glory!	Nominated
1995	CableACE Awards	Best Actor in a Movie or Miniseries	Linda	Nominated
2004	Outer Critics Circle Awards	Outstanding Actor in a Play	The Stendhal Syndrome	Nominated
2016	Drama Desk Awards	Outstanding Featured Actor in a Play	Incident at Vichy	Nominated
2017	Outer Critics Circle Awards	Outstanding Featured Actor in a Play	The Little Foxes	Nominated
2017	Tony Awards	Best Featured Actor in a Play	The Little Foxes	Nominated
2026	Tony Awards	Best Featured Actor in a Play	The Balusters	Nominated
2026	Drama Desk Awards	Outstanding Featured Performance in a Play	The Balusters	Nominated
