= The Master of Ballantrae =

1889 novel by Robert Louis Stevenson

The Master of Ballantrae: A Winter's Tale
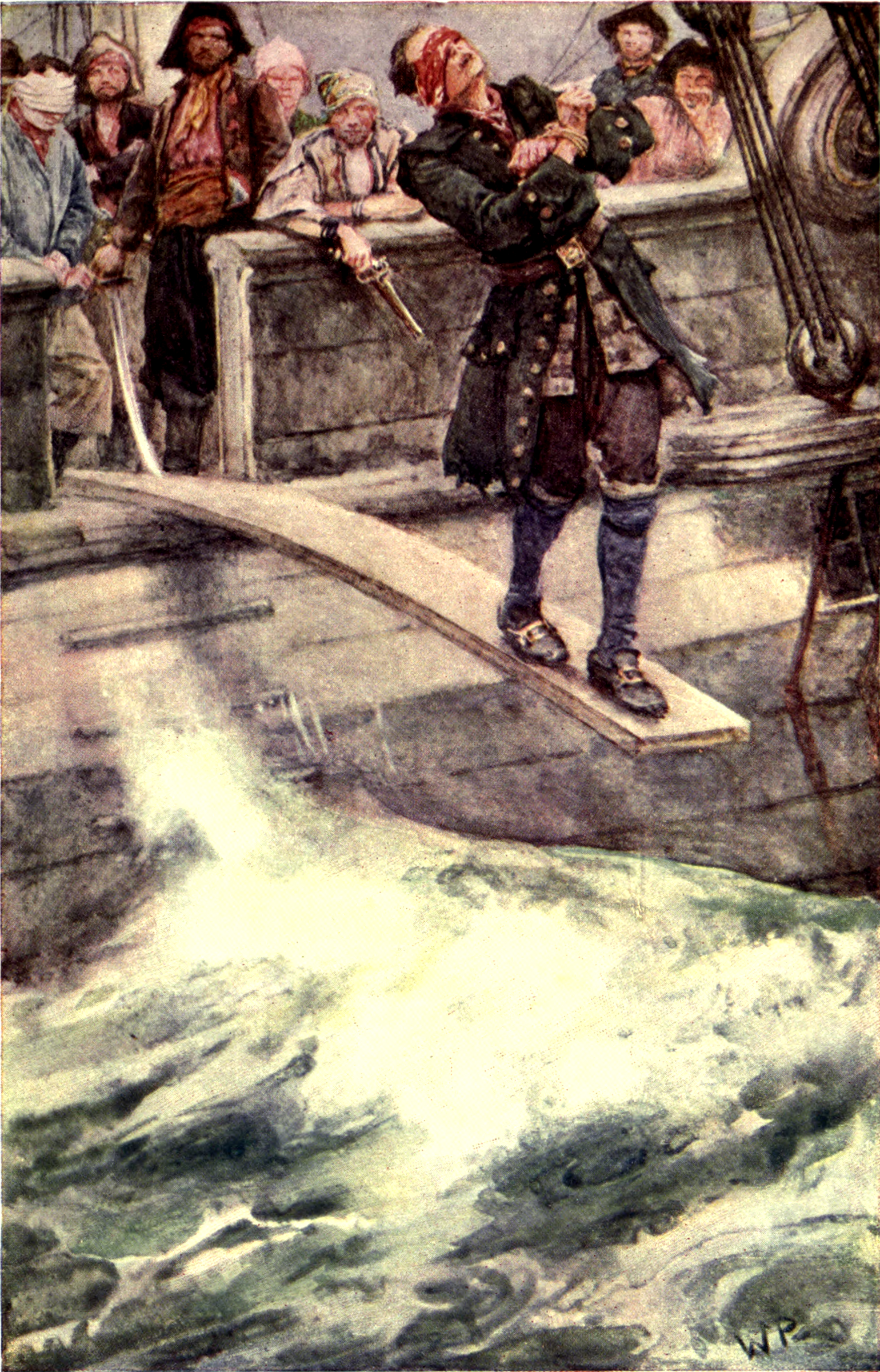
- Painting by Wal Paget in the Cassell edition
- Author: Robert Louis Stevenson
- Language: English
- Genre: Historical, Adventure novel
- Publisher: Cassell
- Publication date: 1889
- Publication place: Scotland
- Media type: Print (hardback & paperback)

The Master of Ballantrae: A Winter's Tale is an 1889 novel by the Scottish author Robert Louis Stevenson, focusing upon the conflict between two brothers, Scottish noblemen whose family is torn apart by the Jacobite rising of 1745. He worked on the book in Tautira after his health was restored.

== Variant openings ==
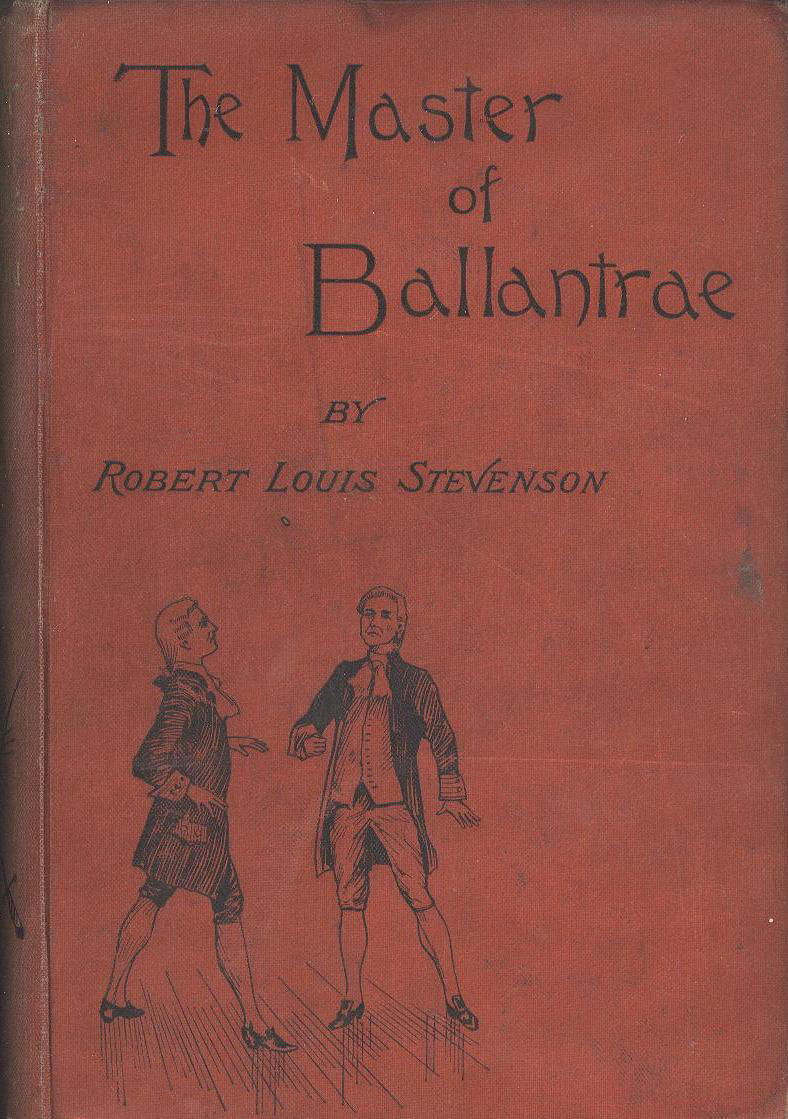
1st UK edition 1889

In the first edition of 1889 the book began with Chapter One, "Summary of Events During the Master's Wanderings". For the second edition (known as the Edinburgh Edition) Stevenson added a preface in which he pretended to have been given the manuscript by an acquaintance. There is also an "Art-Type Edition" which includes a preface and contains an Editorial Note. Stevenson stated in a letter that he made this change because he wanted to draw a portrait of a real-life friend of his upon whom the acquaintance in the preface is based. In the many reprintings since then the preface has sometimes been included and sometimes not. Nothing in the preface, however, has any direct relevance to the story.

== Plot summary ==
=== The Rising ===
The novel is presented as the memoir of one Ephraim Mackellar, steward of the Durrisdeer estate in Scotland. The novel opens in 1745, the year of the Jacobite rising. When Bonnie Prince Charlie raises the banner of the Stuarts, the Durie family—the Laird of Durrisdeer, his older son James Durie (the Master of Ballantrae) and his younger son Henry Durie—decide on a common strategy: one son will join the uprising while the other will join the loyalists. That way, whichever side wins, the family's noble status and estate will be preserved. Logically, the younger son should join the rebels, but the Master insists on being the rebel (a more exciting choice) and contemptuously accuses Henry of trying to usurp his place, comparing him to Jacob. The two sons agree to toss a coin to determine who goes. The Master wins and departs to join the Rising, while Henry remains in support of King George II.

The Rising fails and the Master is reported dead. Henry becomes the heir to the estate, though he does not assume his brother's title of Master. At the insistence of the Laird (their father) the Master's heartbroken fiancée marries Henry to repair the Durie fortunes. Some years pass, during which Henry is unfairly vilified by the townspeople for betraying the rising. He is treated with complete indifference by his family, since his wife and his father both spend their time mourning the fallen favourite. The mild-tempered Henry bears the injustice quietly, even sending money to support his brother's abandoned mistress, who abuses him foully, and her child, who she claims is his brother's bastard.

=== Colonel Burke ===
In April 1749, however, a messenger appears, one Colonel Francis Burke, an Irishman who had been out with the Prince. He bears letters from the Master, who is still alive and living in France. At this point the narrator, Mackellar, introduces a story within the story: it is the memoir of Colonel Burke, from which Mackellar extracts the sections that deal with the Master. From Burke's memoir it appears that the Master was attached to the Prince solely for the chance of money and high station, and was a quarrelsome hindrance, always favouring whatever he thought the Prince wanted to hear. He abandoned the Rising as soon as it looked sure to fail and, in company with Burke, took ship for France, refusing to wait in case they might be able to rescue the Prince. However, the ship was old and unseaworthy, and commanded by an incompetent captain. After seven days of being lost in bad weather, it was taken by pirates. The pirate captain, who called himself Teach (not the famous Edward Teach, called Blackbeard, who had died some thirty years previously, but an imitator), took both Burke and the Master aboard to join his pirate crew, but had the rest of the ship's company killed.

Burke and the Master sail with the pirates for some time. The Master eventually succeeds in overthrowing Teach and effectively becoming the new captain. He proves to be brutal and ruthless, seizing several ships and slaughtering all their crews to prevent their identifying him. Eventually he steers the ship to the coast of North Carolina, where he abandons it and its crew, to be taken by the Royal Navy, while he escapes with Burke and two confederates, carrying all the ship's treasure between them. In the course of their escape through the swamp the Master treacherously kills one of the confederates and leaves another to die. Burke and the Master obtain passage to Albany on a merchant ship, deserting it once it makes port. Then they strike out across land for Canada, where they hope to find sanctuary among the French, who supported the Rising. They take along a guide, an Indian trader named Chew, but he dies of a fever and the pair became hopelessly lost. For some days the Master navigates his way through the wilderness by tossing a coin, saying, "I can think of no better way to express my scorn of human reason." In the end they bury the treasure. Burke records that the Master blamed his younger brother for all his troubles:

"Have you ever a brother?" said he. "By the blessing of Heaven", said I, "not less than five." "I have the one", said he, with a strange voice; and then presently, "He shall pay me for all this", he added. And when I asked him what was his brother's part in our distress, "What!" he cried, "he sits in my place, he bears my name, he courts my wife; and I am here alone with a damned Irishman in this tooth-chattering desert! Oh, I have been a common gull!" he cried.

After the Master's uncharacteristic explosion the two quarrel and separate. They are reunited in a French fort, and travel back to France. Colonel Burke has kept his share of the pirate treasure, while the Master is on "the largest pension on the Scots Fund of any refugee in Paris".

=== The Master in Exile ===
Henry Durie and Mackellar learn something of the Master's piratical ventures, but do not inform the Laird or Mrs Durie, both of whom continue to regard the Master as a kind of angel lost to them. Henry continues to support the Master's mistress and their illegitimate child, and also answers the Master's demands for money. The Master is in fact well-supported by a pension assigned by the French monarchy to Scotsmen who lost their estates due to the Rising, but he continues to demand money from his brother anyway, accusing him of stealing the inheritance:

"'My dear Jacob' – This is how he begins!" cries he – "'My dear Jacob, I once called you so, you may remember; and you have now done the business, and flung my heels as high as Criffel.' What do you think of that, Mackellar", says he, "from an only brother? I declare to God I liked him very well; I was always staunch to him; and this is how he writes! But I will not sit down under the imputation" – walking to and fro – "I am as good as he; I am a better man than he, I call on God to prove it! I cannot give him all the monstrous sum he asks; he knows the estate to be incompetent; but I will give him what I have, and it is more than he expects. I have borne all this too long. See what he writes further on; read it for yourself: 'I know you are a niggardly dog.' A niggardly dog! I niggardly? Is that true, Mackellar? You think it is?" I really thought he would have struck me at that. "Oh, you all think so! Well, you shall see, and he shall see, and God shall see. If I ruin the estate and go barefoot, I shall stuff this bloodsucker. Let him ask all – all, and he shall have it! It is all his by rights. Ah!" he cried, "and I foresaw all this, and worse, when he would not let me go."

Henry bleeds the estate dry to answer the Master's demands, consequently getting a reputation as a miser. He does not tell even his family where the money is going. This continues for seven years, in the course of which Henry sends the Master some eight thousand pounds.

=== Colonel Burke Again ===
In July 1756 Mackellar receives a letter from Colonel Burke, who is in Champagne. Burke relates that the Master's court intrigues have backfired on him, and he has been imprisoned in the Bastille. He has since been released, but has lost his Scots Fund pension and the regiment he had been commanding, and is now destitute again. He plans an expedition to India, but it will require a good deal of money to send him on his way. Mackellar exults at this chance to be rid of the leech, but by an ill fate this letter has crossed with another letter, in which Henry has told the Master that the estate is at last exhausted.

=== The Master Returns ===
In November 1756 the Master returns to Durrisdeer, under the alias of "Mr Bally". He meets Henry on the road to the house, sneeringly comparing the two of them to Jacob and Esau, and ominously says that Henry has chosen his fate by not agreeing to the Master's plan to go to India. On his return he ingratiates himself with his father and with his brother's wife (who was once his own fiancée). Neither have seen him in eleven years and both are overjoyed at his return. With satanic gifts of deceit and manipulation, the Master turns the family against Henry, always putting him in the wrong and cruelly insulting him, while making it seem as though Henry is insulting the Master. To the family it seems that the Master is a long-suffering and kind-hearted hero and saint, while Henry is a cruel, unfeeling monster. In private the Master gloats to Henry over his success, taunting him by pointing out that their father does not love him, that Henry's daughter prefers the Master's company and that, despite the Master's falseness and crimes, he is everyone's favourite. He exults that he will destroy Henry's virtue:

"[Y]ou need not look such impotent malice, my good fly. You can be rid of your spider when you please. How long, O Lord? When are you to be wrought to the point of a denunciation, scrupulous brother? It is one of my interests in this dreary hole. I ever loved experiment."

Henry suffers all this in stoical silence. Mackellar eventually discovers that the Master betrayed the Jacobites and sold himself out to the Hanoverian government by becoming a paid spy for King George, and that this is the real reason for his safe return. However, even when Henry confronts the Master with this, right in the middle of the Master's holding forth on the great risk he is running by returning to be with his family, the Laird and Mrs Durie remain blind to the Master's nature. Even when the Master demands that the Laird break the entail and sell off a large part of the estate at a disadvantageous price to finance the Master's expedition to India, the Laird remains besotted and rebukes Henry for lack of generosity when he objects.

Eventually the Master goads Henry one time too many. On the night of 27 February 1757 he tells Henry that Mrs Durie has never loved him and has always loved the Master instead. Henry strikes him in the mouth with his fist and the brothers resort to a duel with swords. Henry runs the Master through and he falls to the ground, seemingly dead. Mackellar takes Henry indoors and then rouses the house, but when he and Henry's wife return to the duelling ground the body is gone. By the tracks they can see that the body has been dragged away by smugglers ("free traders"), who carried it to a boat, but whether alive or dead they do not know.

=== The Master in India ===
The Master miraculously survives the sword wound and, with the money extorted from his father, goes to India to make his fortune. Back at the Durrisdeer estate the old Laird declines and dies, and Henry becomes Laird in his place. Mackellar, on his own authority, shows Mrs Durie all the correspondence between Henry and the Master, as well as papers that prove that the Master was a paid spy. Her eyes are opened and she becomes reconciled with Henry, though she also burns the papers, not to protect the Master, but to prevent a scandal for the family. She and Henry have a son, whom they name Alexander (The novel states the boy was born "17th July 1757; since the Master did not return to Durrisdeer until 7 November 1756, Alexander is probably Henry's son rather than the Master's). However, after the duel Henry gradually becomes mentally unstable. His personality changes, and he becomes careless about business and the estate. When Mackellar tells him that the Master is probably still alive he responds strangely:

"Ah!" says Mr Henry; and suddenly rising from his seat with more alacrity than he had yet discovered, set one finger on my breast, and cried at me in a kind of screaming whisper, "Mackellar" – these were his words – "nothing can kill that man. He is not mortal. He is bound upon my back to all eternity – to all eternity!" says he, and, sitting down again, fell upon a stubborn silence.

When Alexander is about eight years old Mackellar comes across Henry showing Alexander the duelling ground and telling him that this was where a man fought with the Devil.

A second excerpt from Colonel Burke's memoir details a brief encounter he had with the Master while they were both in India. Caught in a "mellay", Burke and his cipaye flee and climb into a garden, where Burke sees the Master sitting with an Indian servant named Secundra Dass. Burke requests help from the Master, but the Master does not acknowledge him, while Secundra Dass tells the two of them (in English) to leave and threatens them with a pistol. Burke leaves and the story within a story ends.

=== The Second Return ===
In the Spring of 1764 Mackellar comes downstairs one day to find the Master in the house, accompanied by Secundra Dass. The new Laird receives him coldly and Mackellar warns him that there will be no money forthcoming. The Master sneers and answers him: "[S]peech is very easy, and sometimes very deceptive. I warn you fairly: you will find me vitriol in the house. You would do wiser to pay money down and see my back."

The Laird takes his wife and children and leaves Scotland for New York, where Mrs Durie has a family estate. Mackellar remains behind, and tells the Master that he may have room and board at Durrisdeer, but he will not be permitted to contact the family or given any money. The Master furiously answers:

"Inside of a week, without leaving Durrisdeer, I will find out where these fools are fled to. I will follow; and when I have run my quarry down, I will drive a wedge into that family that shall once more burst it into shivers. I shall see then whether my Lord Durrisdeer" (said with indescribable scorn and rage) "will choose to buy my absence; and you will all see whether, by that time, I decide for profit or revenge."

=== New York ===
Eventually the Master discovers where the Duries have gone and takes ship for New York. Mackellar follows, to get ahead of the Master and warn the Laird. The Master finds the family prepared against him and sets up shop in the town, pretending to work as a tailor, but really only working to poison the town against his brother. Henry, who has grown more unstable as the years have passed, takes pleasure in rubbing the Master's face in his failure. Eventually the Master makes his demand. The pirate treasure he buried years ago is still in the wilderness of New York: if Henry will give him the money to set out and retrieve it, he will leave Henry alone forever. Henry, however, refuses, on the basis of on his brother's record of failed promises and extortion. Mackellar remonstrates that it would be worth the money to be rid of the Master, but Henry will not be moved. Desperate, Mackellar goes to the Master and offers to pay for the expedition himself. The Master refuses and rants that he cares only about ruining his brother:

"Three times I have had my hand upon the highest station: and I am not yet three-and-forty. I know the world as few men know it when they come to die – Court and camp, the East and the West; I know where to go, I see a thousand openings. I am now at the height of my resources, sound of health, of inordinate ambition. Well, all this I resign; I care not if I die, and the world never hear of me; I care only for one thing, and that I will have."

A ship arrives from Britain, carrying news that, in return for his loyalty to the rebels the Master of Ballantrae is to be given the title of Lord (or Laird) of Durrisdeer, and young Alexander, Henry's son and the rightful heir to the estate and title, is to be disinherited. The news is obviously false, but the already unhinged Henry believes it to be true and is driven to full-blown madness. Unknown to Mackellar, Henry secretly arranges with a smuggler to gather a crew of riff-raff and present themselves to the Master as being willing to set out with him to find the buried treasure. Their real purpose, unknown to the Master, will be to murder him and steal the treasure.

=== In the Wilderness ===
The Master is at first deceived, but in the course of the expedition he discovers their plan. He tries to escape, but fails; he tries to set them against one another, but fails; and at last he announces that he has fallen ill. He wastes away and on his deathbed he tells them where the treasure is hidden. Secundra Dass wraps up his body and buries it, and the party sets out to find the treasure, but they fall foul of hostile Native Americans, and all but Secundra Dass and one man named Mountain are killed.

Mountain encounters the diplomat Sir William Johnson, who is on his way to negotiate with the hostile Native Americans. With him are Henry Durie and Mackellar. Mountain tells them about the Master's death and burial, and says that Secundra Dass has gone back to where it happened. Mountain thinks that Dass is after the treasure. Henry, however, is convinced that the Master is not really dead:

"He's not of this world", whispered my lord, "neither him nor the black de'il that serves him. I have struck my sword throughout his vitals", he cried; "I have felt the hilt dirl on his breastbone, and the hot blood spirt in my very face, time and again, time and again!" he repeated, with a gesture indescribable. "But he was never dead for that", said he, and sighed aloud. "Why should I think he was dead now? No, not till I see him rotting", says he.

The party finds Dass digging up the Master's body. Caught in the act, he tells them that the Master faked his illness, and Dass showed him how to swallow his tongue and fake death. They unearth the Master's body and he opens his eyes briefly. Henry faints, falls to the ground and dies. The Master's resurrection is only momentary, as he too dies almost immediately. Mackellar buries the two of them under the same stone, with the inscription:

J. D.,
HEIR TO A SCOTTISH TITLE,
A MASTER OF THE ARTS AND GRACES,
ADMIRED IN EUROPE, ASIA, AMERICA,
IN WAR AND PEACE,
IN THE TENTS OF SAVAGE HUNTERS AND THE
CITADELS OF KINGS, AFTER SO MUCH
ACQUIRED, ACCOMPLISHED, AND
ENDURED, LIES HERE FORGOTTEN.
* * * * *
H. D.,
HIS BROTHER,
AFTER A LIFE OF UNMERITED DISTRESS,
BRAVELY SUPPORTED,
DIED ALMOST IN THE SAME HOUR,
AND SLEEPS IN THE SAME GRAVE
WITH HIS FRATERNAL ENEMY.
* * * * *
THE PIETY OF HIS WIFE AND ONE OLD
SERVANT RAISED THIS STONE

TO BOTH.

== Adaptations ==
The novel was made into a 1953 film with Errol Flynn as the Master. An adaptation for the stage was produced by the Edinburgh Gateway Company in 1959. There have been several TV adaptations, including a 1984 presentation in the Hallmark Hall of Fame, with John Gielgud as the Laird. A radio version was broadcast by BBC Radio 4 in 2004 and on BBC Radio 4 Extra in 2020.

The Robert Louis Stevenson website maintains a complete list of derivative works.

== Original manuscript ==
Half of Stevenson's original manuscripts are lost, including those of Treasure Island, The Black Arrow and The Master of Ballantrae. Stevenson's heirs sold Stevenson's papers during World War I; many Stevenson documents were auctioned off in 1918.

== See also ==
- Evil twin
