= Richard Thomas (dancer) =

American ballet dancer, born 1925

- Born: Richard Scott Thomas; December 3, 1925; Paintsville, Kentucky, U.S.
- Died: July 27, 2013 (aged 87); Paintsville, Kentucky, U.S.
- Occupation: Ballet dancer
- Spouse: Barbara Fallis (m. 1950; died 1980)
- Children: 2; including Richard
- Dancing career
- Former groups: New York City Ballet; Company Alicia Alonso; American Ballet Theatre; Ballet Russe de Monte Carlo

Richard Scott Thomas (December 3, 1925 – July 27, 2013) was an American dancer, educator, and co-founder of the New York School of Ballet along with his wife Barbara Fallis. He is known as a teacher of Eliot Feld and Twyla Tharp.

== Early life ==
Thomas was born on December 3, 1925, in Paintsville, Kentucky. His father was a coal miner and his mother a nurse. At the encouragement of his father, Thomas enrolled one semester at the University of Kentucky, Lexington, intending to pursue an engineering degree.

== Dancing career ==
=== As a performer ===
Following his first exposure to a performance by the Ballet Russe de Monte Carlo – while visiting relatives in Seattle, Washington – he entered the tutelage of Russian ballet dancer and choreographer Bronislava Nijinska in Los Angeles, and Vincenzo Celli and Anatole Vilzak in New York. Thomas subsequently appeared on Broadway in Kiss Me Kate and Billion Dollar Baby.

During his early career with the Ballets Russes de Monte Carlo and Ballet Theatre, Thomas met fellow dancer Barbara Fallis, whom he married in Cuba in 1950 while both were on tour with the Company Alicia Alonso (later the National Ballet of Cuba). Their son – future Emmy-winning actor and The Waltons star Richard Thomas – was born a year later. Thomas's first teaching experience also occurred there, when Fernando Alonso attempted to develop a school by selecting pupils from a local orphanage and asked Thomas to assist.

The Thomases returned to Manhattan to dance with the New York City Ballet from 1953 to 1958. During this time Thomas was a frequent soloist and member of the premiere casts of Todd Bolender's Souvenirs, Balanchine's Jeux, and Jerome Robbins's The Concert (or The Perils of Everybody). Thomas left the New York City Ballet in 1958 to join the circus but soon returned to the city to indulge his overriding desire to teach.

=== As a teacher ===
Thomas, who was known by his friends and pupils as "Dick" or "Dicky," first joined Harry Asmus at a school on Broadway and 54th Street, chiefly working with students from the High School of the Performing Arts. He later was employed at the schools of June Taylor and Robert Joffrey, whose company he escorted to Russia. In 1963 he abandoned a position at American Ballet Theatre to open what would become the New York School of Ballet on West 56th Street, with his wife. Thomas and Fallis alternated shifts at the Pennsylvania Ballet in Philadelphia to fund their fledgling school, out of which Eliot Feld founded the American Ballet Company.

In 1969 George Balanchine and Lincoln Kerstein offered the couple the former studios of the School of American Ballet, at 2291 Broadway between 82nd and 83rd Street. Thomas taught well-established and up-and-coming students in his daily classes, including Cynthia Gregory, Debbie Allen, Christine Sarry, Twyla Tharp, Sean Lavery, and Feld.

In 1975 following Feld's departure, the couple formed U.S. Terpsichore, as a touring showcase of the most advanced New York School of Ballet students. Daniel Levans (b. 1953) served as co-artistic director and choreographer of the troupe, composed of approximately 25 to 40 members, mostly teenagers – including Thomas's and Fallis's children Richard Thomas and Bronwyn Thomas (b. 1960). Their repertory of over 30 ballets included both the classic and the contemporary, such as the work of Merce Cunningham and Levans.

Thomas was one of the first ballet directors to arrange performances for schools. The troupe originally appeared in New York City and Kentucky venues, until a 1976–1977 series of nationwide performances contracted with Columbia Artists Management, inc., who insisted the ten-member troupe appear under the title of "Richard Thomas Theatre Ballet"; this led to further extensive traveling through the U.S., Canada, and Mexico. The revenue from sold-out houses helped fund the school. In 1984 he raised $370,000 to organize and host the First International Ballet Competition with co-founder Ilona Copen; the competition – which unconventionally required all participants to perform the same four pas de deux rather than their own selected dances – still continues to this day.

After Fallis's death in 1980, Thomas directed the troupe and operated the School until its forced closure in 1985. He continued to teach, chiefly children, commencing work in 1990 at Feld's Ballet Tech School, which educated minority students at New York City public schools. Thomas eventually retired to a farm in Kentucky, where he committed to an already established second career in dog breeding and showing until his death from a stroke on July 27, 2013.
