= Backchat (ballet) =

Backchat is a ballet made by Eliot Feld for his Ballet Tech company to "Idle Chatter Junior" by Paul Lansky. The premiere took place October 21, 2004, during the company's MANDANCE PROJECT season at the Joyce Theater, New York. The New York City Ballet premiere of Backchat was Saturday, April 29, 2006, at the New York State Theater, Lincoln Center.

== Original casts ==
=== ManDance Project ===
- Wu-Kang Chen
- Nickemil Concepcion
- Jason Jordan

=== NYCB ===
- Adrian Danchig-Waring
- Craig Hall
- Andrew Veyette
