= The Red Badge of Courage (1974 film) =

Television film directed by Lee Philips

- Genre: Drama; War; Western
- Based on: The Red Badge of Courage by Stephen Crane
- Teleplay by: John Gay
- Directed by: Lee Philips
- Starring: Richard Thomas; Michael Brandon; Wendell Burton
- Theme music composer: Jack Elliott
- Country of origin: United States
- Original language: English

Production
- Executive producer: Norman Rosemont
- Producer: Charles B. Fitzsimons
- Production location: Arizona
- Cinematography: Charles F. Wheeler
- Editor: George Jay Nicholson
- Running time: 98 minutes
- Production companies: 20th Century Fox Television; Norman Rosemont Productions

Original release
- Network: NBC
- Release: December 3, 1974

The Red Badge of Courage is a 1974 American TV movie based on the 1895 novel The Red Badge of Courage by Stephen Crane.

== Cast ==
- Richard Thomas as Henry Fleming
- Michael Brandon as Jim Conklin
- Wendell Burton as Wilson
- Charles Aidman as Tattered Man
- Warren Berlinger as Cheery Soldier
- Lee de Broux as Sergeant
