= Eliot Feld =

American ballet choreographer, teacher, and director

- Born: July 5, 1942 (age 84); Brooklyn, New York
- Education: High School of Performing Arts; School of American Ballet
- Occupations: ballet choreographer, performer, teacher, and director
- Known for: American Ballet Company; Feld Ballet; New Ballet School; New York Public School for Dance; Ballet Tech
- Parent(s): Benjamin Noah Feld and Alice (née Posner)
- Awards: Guggenheim Fellowship, 1969

Eliot Feld (born July 5, 1942) is an American modern ballet choreographer, performer, teacher, and director. Feld works in contemporary ballet. His company and schools, including the Feld Ballet and Ballet Tech, are involved in dance and dance education in New York City.

Feld has choreographed 149 ballets since 1967, with his work being performed by such companies as American Ballet Theatre, the Joffrey Ballet, the Juilliard School, New York City Ballet, the New York City Opera, and Mikhail Baryshnikov, among many others.

== Life and career ==
Feld was born in Borough Park, Brooklyn, New York City, the son of Alice (née Posner), a travel agent, and Benjamin Noah Feld, an attorney. Feld attended the High School of Performing Arts in New York, and studied at the School of American Ballet and the New Dance Group, as well as with Richard Thomas and Donald McKayle.

He performed as a child in George Balanchine's original production of The Nutcracker as the Nutcracker Prince; and later with the companies of Mary Anthony, Pearl Lang, and Sophie Maslow. At sixteen he appeared on Broadway in West Side Story and was cast as Baby John in the movie version of the musical; during the filming of "Cool" (one of the hardest dances in the film), Feld was sick with pneumonia. His other Broadway credits from this period include I Can Get It for You Wholesale and Fiddler on the Roof.

He appeared on television on The Garry Moore Show and The Ed Sullivan Show.

Later, Feld joined American Ballet Theatre, leaving at age 25 to form his own company.

In the early 1980s, with Cora Cahan, Feld founded the Joyce Theater as a home for the Feld Ballet. Feld was also instrumental in the creation of the Lawrence A. Wien Center for Dance & Theater at 890 Broadway in New York City.

== Feld's companies and schools ==
In 1967, at the age of twenty-five, Feld broke away from the American Ballet Theatre to form his own company, the American Ballet Company. Feld used his new company, later known simply as Feld Ballet, to explore a variety of dance genres.

In 1978, Feld began a ballet school, the New Ballet School. Feld believed that all children should have the opportunity to learn dance, regardless of their family income. In keeping with that philosophy, and in partnership with the New York City Board of Education, he auditioned more than 1,500 children at eight New York City public schools; almost 150 students were then enrolled, tuition-free, to a 17-week course at the New Ballet School. Additional dancers at the school were drawn from other troupes and academies. Since its 1978 founding, Feld's school has auditioned more than 900,000 New York City public school students, and invited more than 26,000 children to take free Introduction to Ballet classes. In 1996 the school changed its name to the New York City Public School for Dance.

In 1997, Feld merged the New York City Public School for Dance and Feld Ballet into Ballet Tech, providing a unified organization, and establishing a professional performing outlet for the school's graduates. In 2003, Feld disbanded Feld Ballet to focus on his schools. Today, Ballet Tech's activities include the tuition-free New York City Public School for Dance, and Kids Dance, a pre-professional children's group.

== Choreography ==
Feld has choreographed 149 ballets since 1967. His work has been performed by the American Ballet Company, American Ballet Theatre, the Atlanta Ballet, Mikhail Baryshnikov, Feld Ballets/NY & Ballet Tech & Kids Dance, the Boston Ballet, the Joffrey Ballet, the John Curry Skating Company, the Juilliard School, the London Festival Ballet, the National Ballet of Canada, the New York City Ballet, the New York City Opera, the Pacific Northwest Ballet, the Richmond Ballet, the Royal Danish Ballet, the Royal Swedish Ballet, the Royal Winnipeg Ballet, and the San Francisco Ballet, among others. Feld planned a ballet for Patrick Swayze and Mikhail Baryshnikov, prevented by Swayze's knee reconstruction.

Feld's choreography also appeared in the revival of the Broadway musical On the Town (2001), performed in Central Park. In place of the company's usual summer engagement at the Joyce Theater, Feld included several of his own dancers of the Ballet Tech company.

Feld uses aspects from ballet and modern dance and fuses them together in his work. "The down of one, the up of the other — both beauties attracted me, I think I've spent my choreographic life trying in some way to reconcile, cope, deal with these two elements. He claims to have always "loved the pointe shoe."

Feld's works are varied and contain anything from off-beat music to aerobic exercises, including somersaults, push-ups, sprints, leaps, and calisthenics. Some of his choreography was inspired by Jewish material; other works were influenced by Martha Graham. Feld has choreographed 15 ballets to the music of Steve Reich.

Pointing 3, Feld's most recent ballet, premiered in New York in June 2018; it was choreographed for 4 students from the Ballet Tech school, to the second movement of Music for Airports, by Brian Eno, arranged by David Lang.

In May 2024, Feld and Ballet Tech announced that most of Feld's ballets were being placed in the public domain.

=== Selected choreographic works ===
- 1967: Harbinger (May 1967; American Ballet Theatre, New York State Theater) - set to music by Sergei Prokofiev
- 1967: At Midnight (ABT) — set to music by Gustav Mahler
- 1969: Intermezzo #1 — set to waltzes by Johannes Brahms
- 1974: Tzaddik - set to music by Aaron Copland
- 1974: Sephardic Song
- 1977: A Footstep of Air (Eliot Feld Ballet, Wolf Trap National Park for the Performing Arts) — set to music by Beethoven
- 1978: La Vida (April 1978, Eliot Feld Ballet, Plymouth Theatre) — set to music by Aaron Copland
- 1978: Santa Fe Saga (April 1978; Feld Ballet, Plymouth Theatre) — set to music by Morton Gould, featuring Mikhail Baryshnikov
- 1978: Half Time - set to music by Morton Gould
- 1979: Danzon Cuban — set to music by Aaron Copland
- 1979: Papillon
- 1982: Anatomic Balm (Feld Ballet, Joyce Theater) — set to ragtime
- 1982: Play Bach (Feld Ballet, Joyce Theater) — set to Bach
- 1982: Straw Hearts (October 1982, Feld Ballet, Joyce Theater)
- 1984: Adieu (Feld Ballet, Joyce Theater) — dedicated to Feld's late teacher Richard Thomas
- 1984: The Jig Is Up
- 1984: The Grand Canon (Feld Ballet, Joyce Theater) — set to music by Steve Reich
- 1985: Against the Sky- music by Béla Bartók
- 1985: Intermezzo No. 2 - music by Johannes Brahms
- 1985: Medium: Rare — Music by Steve Reich
- 1985: Aurora I — Music by Steve Reich
- 1985: Aurora II — Music by Steve Reich
- 1986: Echo — Music by Steve Reich
- 1986: Bent Planes — Music by Steve Reich
- 1988: The Unanswered Question: Some Intimations of the American Composer Charles Ives (April 1988, New York City Ballet, New York State Theatre) — set to Charles Ives' The Unanswered Question
- 1988: Kore — Music by Steve Reich
- 1990: Ion — Music by Steve Reich
- 1991: Clave — Music by Steve Reich
- 1992: Hello Fancy
- 1993: The Relative Disposition of the Parts (March 1993, Feld Ballets/NY, Joyce Theater) — set to Bach's orchestral suites
- 1995: Chi — Music by Steve Reich
- 1995: Tongue and Groove — Music by Steve Reich
- 2004: Proverb — Music by Steve Reich
- 2004: A Stair Dance — Music by Steve Reich
- 2004: Backchat (April 2004; Ballet Tech, Joyce Theater) — set to "Idle Chatter Junior" by Paul Lansky
- 2005: Sir Isaac's Apples — Music by Steve Reich - commissioned by The Juilliard School
- 2008: Isis In Transit — Music by Steve Reich
- 2008: Dotty Polkas — set to music by Johann Strauss II and Josef Strauss
- 2008: Quickstep — set to music by Steve Martland
- 2013: Upside Dance — set to Scandinavian folk music
- 2014: KYDZNY — set to music performed by the Raya Brass Band
- 2015: A Yankee Doodle (June 2015, Kids Dance/Ballet Tech, Joyce Theater)
- 2017: Pointing 1 — set to music by Julia Wolfe
- 2018: Pointing 2 — set to music by Paul Lansky
- 2018: Pointing 3 — set to music by Brian Eno, arranged by David Lang

== Accolades ==
Feld has picked up numerous awards, including the John Simon Guggenheim Fellowship (1969), the Dance Magazine Award (1990), and an honorary doctorate degree from Juilliard (1991).
