= Cadenet (disambiguation) =

Cadenet is a village in southeastern France.

Cadenet may also refer to:

== People ==
- Cadenet (troubadour) (c. 1160–c. 1235), Provençal troubadour (trobador) who lived and wrote at the court of Raymond VI of Toulouse
- Alain de Cadenet (1945–2022), television presenter and racing driver
- Amanda de Cadenet (born 1972), English photographer, author, and media personality based in Los Angeles
- Alexander de Cadenet (born 1974), also known as Bruiser, British artist

== Other ==
- Canton of Cadenet, a French former administrative division in the department of Vaucluse
