= Eric Schaeffer =

American actor, writer, and director (born 1962)

- Born: January 22, 1962 (age 64); New York City, U.S.
- Education: Bard College
- Occupations: Actor, film director, screenwriter
- Years active: 1993–present

Eric Schaeffer (born January 22, 1962) is an American actor, writer, and director.

== Early life and education ==
Schaeffer was born in New York City, New York, and later graduated with a degree in drama and dance from Bard College. After graduating, he drove a New York City taxi for nine years, during which time he wrote two stage plays, a novel, twenty screenplays and various other works.

== Career ==
Schaeffer rose to fame with fellow actor/writer/director Donal Lardner Ward on the independent film My Life's in Turnaround (1993), which was made in fifteen days for only $200,000. Schaeffer and Ward parlayed the film's success into Too Something (1995–1996), a short-lived sitcom that was briefly renamed New York Daze.

He signed on as a client of Creative Artists Agency and made a deal to direct the 1996 romantic comedy If Lucy Fell for a budget of $3.5 million for Columbia TriStar.

Schaeffer starred opposite model Amanda de Cadenet in the 1997 romantic drama Fall, about a cab driver who begins a passionate affair with a model he first met in his cab.

In 2000, he released the comedy Wirey Spindell, a semi-autobiographical tale. This was followed by the 2001 romantic comedy Never Again, starring Jill Clayburgh and Jeffrey Tambor, and Mind the Gap in 2004.

In recent years Schaeffer has been writing an autobiographical blog, I Can't Believe I'm Still Single, about his relationships and ongoing search for love. Schaeffer has turned the blog into a book, I Can't Believe I'm Still Single – Sane, Slightly Neurotic (But in a Sane Way) Filmmaker into Good Yoga, Bad Reality TV, Too Much Chocolate, and a Little Kinky Sex Seeks Smart, Emotionally Evolved ... Oh Hell, At This Point Anyone Who'll Let Me Watch Football.

In 2008, Schaeffer debuted a reality television series on Showtime, also called I Can't Believe I'm Still Single.

In 2009, Schaeffer and Jill Franklyn created the half-hour dramedy series Gravity for Starz. The series, which was about people who survived suicide attempts – originally titled Failure to Fly – starred Schaeffer along with Krysten Ritter, Ivan Sergei, Ving Rhames and Rachel Hunter. It began airing in April 2010 and on June 30, 2010, the show was cancelled.

== Filmography and television work ==
=== Actor, director and screenwriter ===
Year	Title	Genre	Role	Notes
1993	My Life's in Turnaround	romantic comedy drama	Splick	
1995–1996	Too Something	situation comedy	Eric McDougal	television series
1996	If Lucy Fell	romantic comedy	Joe MacGonaughgill	
1997	Fall	romantic drama	Michael Shiver	
2000	Wirey Spindell	comedy	Wirey Spindell	
2001	Never Again	romantic comedy	–	no acting
2004	Mind the Gap	comedy drama	Sam Blue	
2005	Starved	situation comedy	Sam	television series
2008-2011	I Can't Believe I'm Still Single	reality television	Himself	television series
2010	Gravity	comedy drama	Detective Miller	television series
2011	They're Out of the Business	comedy	Splick	sequel
2011	After Fall, Winter	romantic drama	Michael Shiver	sequel
2012	Eric Schaeffer: Life Coach	situation comedy	Eric Schaeffer	web series
2014	Boy Meets Girl	romantic comedy drama	Police Officer	
2021	Before I Go	comedy drama	–	uncredited cameo

=== Actor (only) ===
Year	Title	Genre	Role	Notes
1995	The Computer Wore Tennis Shoes		Rich Prentiss	
1998	Gunshy	crime drama	Gwynne	
1999	Everything's Relative		Marty Gorelick	television series
2001	First Years		Sam O'Donnell	television series
2001	One Night at McCool's	dark comedy neo-noir	Greg Spradling	
2003	The Dead Zone	science-fiction suspense	Francis Ritter	television series episode: "Valley of the Shadow" (January 5, 2003)
2004	Century City	science-fiction legal drama	Darwin McNeil	television series
2004	Marmalade	comedy	Dan	
2004	Spanglish	comedy drama	Rabid Sports Fan	

== Books ==
- Schaeffer, Eric (2007). I Can't Believe I'm Still Single – Sane, Slightly Neurotic (But in a Sane Way) Filmmaker into Good Yoga, Bad Reality TV, Too Much Chocolate, and a Little Kinky Sex Seeks Smart, Emotionally Evolved ... Oh Hell, At This Point Anyone Who'll Let Me Watch Football. New York City: Thunder's Mouth Press. ISBN 978-1-56858-337-2.

== See also ==
- Lists of American writers
- List of film and television directors
- List of people from New York City
