= Eric Scott (actor) =

American actor (born 1958)

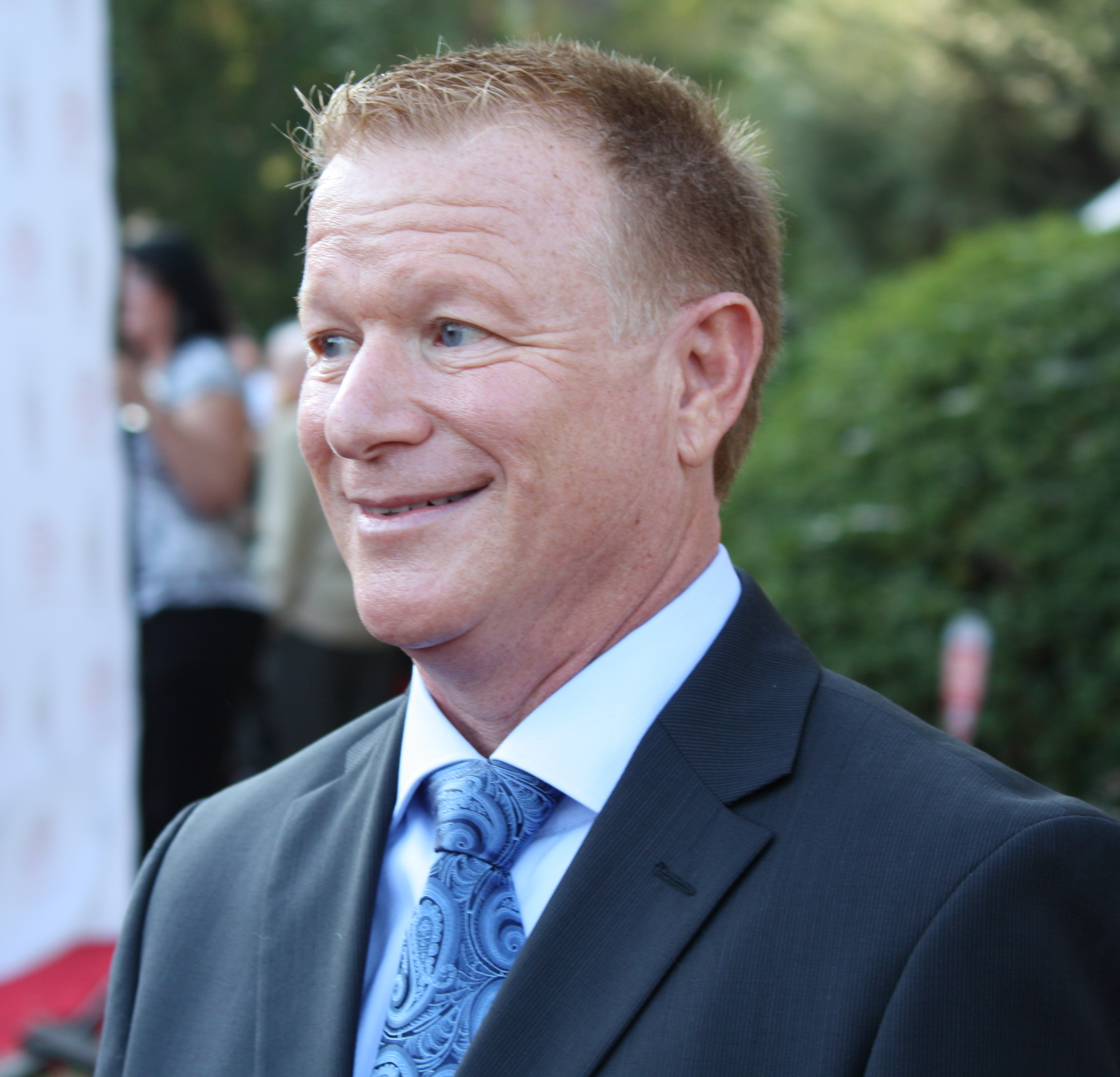
- Scott in 2012
- Born: Eric Scott Magat; October 20, 1958 (age 67); Los Angeles, California, U.S.
- Occupation: Actor
- Years active: 1971–2011
- Spouses: Karey Louis (1980–1982) Theresa Fargo (1989–1992); Cynthia Ullman Wolfen (m. 2000)

Eric Scott (born Eric Scott Magat; October 20, 1958, in Los Angeles, California, United States) is an American actor who is best known for his role as Ben Walton, which he first played in the television film The Homecoming: A Christmas Story (1971) and then in the series it inspired, The Waltons.

== Early life ==
Scott's father was a mail carrier, and his mother was his guardian on the set of The Waltons. He has an older brother, Alan, and a younger brother, Dana.

== Career ==
As a child he appeared in several television commercials, and had roles in Medical Center, The Interns, Bewitched, Lancer, The Doris Day Show, The Young Rebels, and in the film The Million Dollar Duck, starring Sandy Duncan.

In 1971, he first played the role of Ben Walton on the television movie, The Homecoming: A Christmas Story (1971). He reprised the role when the film turned into The Waltons, premiering in 1972 and remaining on the series throughout its nine-season run until its end in 1981. He eventually reprised the role again for all of the series' television films and reunions during the 1980s and 1990s.

During his tenure on The Waltons, Scott attempted a music career with his co-star Joe Conley (who played Ike Godsey), where he approached Scott to create a song-and-dance act, and tour across the country, in which Scott agreed. They took their live show on the road, and eventually recorded and released an album together in 1979, where they sang popular hit songs spanning several decades, from the 1930s through the 1970s, which included music from Elvis Presley and The Beatles; it also included a special version of the Waltons' theme song with added lyrics. This act would take part on The Waltons as well, as they sang and dance together on the seventh-season episode "The Obstacle" in 1979. Scott and Conley developed a lifelong relationship through the years until the latter's death in 2013.

After The Waltons ended in 1981, Scott appeared on few shows and movies. He appeared on the television series The Fall Guy, and the movies The Loch Ness Horror (1982) and Never Again (2001), where he reunited with Sandy Duncan.

== Personal life ==
Scott is of the Jewish faith.

He was briefly married to actress Karey Louis. His second marriage was to Theresa Fargo, the mother of his daughter, until her death from acute myelomonocytic leukemia on November 5, 1992. Fargo developed the disease during her pregnancy. The child was delivered by cesarean section one month early so that Fargo could begin chemotherapy, but Fargo died two days after the birth.

In March 2000, Scott married Cynthia (Cindy) Ullman Wolfen. They have two children.

Today, Scott owns Chase Messengers, a parcel delivery service, in Encino, California. He stated that being rejected from auditions as a child was a good preparation for working in sales.

== Filmography ==
=== Film ===
Year	Title	Role	Notes
1971	The Million Dollar Duck	Eddie	Uncredited
1982	The Loch Ness Horror	Brad	
1997	Defying Gravity	Steinman	
2001	Never Again	Arthur	

=== Television ===
Year	Title	Role	Notes
1969	Lancer	Robbie Moran	Episode: "The Gifts"
1970	The Doris Day Show	Boy	Episode: "The Gas Station"
1970	The Interns	Christopher	Episode: "Dancy"
1971	Bewitched	Herbie	Episode: "Out of the Mouths of Babes"
1971	Medical Center	Danny	Episode: "The Corrupted"
1971	The Homecoming: A Christmas Story	Ben Walton	TV film which inspired The Waltons
1972–1981	The Waltons	Ben Walton	212 episodes
1974	The FBI Versus Alvin Karpis, Public Enemy Number One	Bert	TV movie
1978–1979	ABC Afterschool Special	Eric / David	2 episodes
1980	The Waltons: A Decade of the Waltons	Ben Walton / Himself	TV movie
1982	A Wedding on Walton's Mountain	Ben Walton	TV movie
1982	Mother's Day on Walton's Mountain	Ben Walton	TV movie
1982	A Day for Thanks on Walton's Mountain	Ben Walton	TV movie
1985	The Fall Guy	Sheldon Down	Episode: "Spring Break"
1993	A Walton Thanksgiving Reunion	Ben Walton	TV movie
1995	A Walton Wedding	Ben Walton	TV movie
1997	A Walton Easter	Ben Walton	TV movie

== Discography ==
- Joe Conley & Eric Scott of The Waltons (1979)
