= Lifepod =

Lifepod may refer to:

- Lifepod (1993 film), a television film reworking of the Alfred Hitchcock film Lifeboat
- Lifepod (1981 film), an American science fiction thriller film
- Escape pod or lifepod
