= Suzanne Shepherd =

American actress and theater director (1934–2023)

- Suzanne Shepherd on The Sopranos
- Born: Sadie Gertrude Stern; October 31, 1934; Elizabeth, New Jersey, U.S.
- Died: November 17, 2023 (aged 89); Manhattan, New York, U.S.
- Occupations: Actress; theater director
- Years active: 1960s–2023
- Spouses: David Shepherd (m. 1957; div. 1966); Carroll Calkins (m. 1996; died 2006)
- Children: 2, including Kate

Sadie Gertrude Stern (October 31, 1934 – November 17, 2023), known professionally as Suzanne Shepherd, was an American actress and theater director.

== Background ==
Shepherd was born Sadie Gertrude Stern on October 31, 1934, to a Jewish family in Elizabeth, New Jersey, the daughter of Dora (Mendelson), a cook, and David Stern, a distributor of jukeboxes and vending machines. She began using the name "Suzanne" when she was 13. She attended Battin High School and Bennington College, and studied acting with Sanford Meisner. She later went on to teach Meisner's program of acting study, the first woman to do so.

== Career ==
Shepherd was a founding member of the Compass Players in the early 1960s, along with Alan Alda and Alan Arkin.

Shepherd was known for her portrayal of Aunt Tweedy in the film Mystic Pizza, Karen's overbearing mother in the film Goodfellas, Carmela Soprano's mother Mary DeAngelis in the HBO television series The Sopranos, and the assistant school principal in Uncle Buck, receiving a memorable verbal assault from Buck. She also played the role of Mrs. Scarlini in the 2000 film Requiem for a Dream, and Big Ethel in A Dirty Shame. In 2016, she played the role of Lucille Abetemarco the mother of Detective Anthony Abetemarco played by former Sopranos co-star Steve Schirripa in "Good Cop Bad Cop" the second episode of the seventh season of the CBS police procedural drama Blue Bloods. In 2018, she reprised the role of Lucille Abetemarco in "Trust" the sixth episode of the ninth season of Blue Bloods.

Shepherd was also a theatre director, working in New York and in regional theatre.

== Personal life and death ==
From a marriage to David Shepherd, which lasted from 1957 until their divorce in 1966, she had a son, who died in 2011, and a daughter, artist Kate Shepherd. Her second marriage, to Carroll Calkins, lasted from 1996 until his death in 2006.

Shepherd died from chronic obstructive pulmonary disease and kidney failure at her home in Manhattan on November 17, 2023, at the age of 89.

== Filmography ==
=== Film ===
Year	Title	Role	Notes
1988	Mystic Pizza	Aunt Tweedy	
1988	Working Girl	Trask Receptionist	
1989	Uncle Buck	Mrs. Hoargarth	
1989	Second Sight	Marilyn Bloom	
1990	Goodfellas	Karen's Mother	
1990	Jacob's Ladder	Hospital Receptionist	
1995	The Jerky Boys: The Movie	Mrs. B	
1995	Palookaville	Mother	
1996	Bullet	Cookie Stein	
1996	Trees Lounge	Jackie	
1997	Lolita	Miss Pratt	
1998	Illuminata	Marco's mother	
1998	Living Out Loud	Mary	
1998	American Cuisine	Martha	
1999	On the Run	Lady in Travel Agency	
2000	Requiem for a Dream	Mrs. Scarlini	
2001	Never Again	Mother	
2004	A Dirty Shame	Big Ethel	
2008	Choke	Waitress	
2008	Harold	Maude Sellers	
2009	I Hate Valentine's Day	Edie	
2012	Delivering the Goods	Mrs. Weinbaum	
2013	Jerome's Bouquet	Elana Klein	Short film
2017	Where Is Kyra?	Ruth	
2018	Furlough	Elizabeth Anderson	
2018	The Week Of	Aunt Iris	
2023	The Performance	Tess	

=== Television ===
Year	Title	Role	Notes
1990	Law & Order	Arraignment Judge Victoria Sawyer	Episode: "The Reaper's Helper"
1998	Vig	Agnes	Television film
2000	Third Watch	Sheats	Episode: "Young Men and Fire..."
2000, 2004	Ed	Elaine / Edna	2 episodes
2000–2007	The Sopranos	Mary DeAngelis	20 episodes
2002	Law & Order: Criminal Intent	Joan	Episode: "Homo Homini Lupus"
2003	Law & Order: Special Victims Unit	Old Woman	Episode: "Desperate"
2010	Gravity	Scarf Woman	Episode: "Dogg Day Afternoon"
2016–2018	Blue Bloods	Lucille Abetemarco	2 episodes
