= Sandy Kenyon =

American actor (1922–2010)

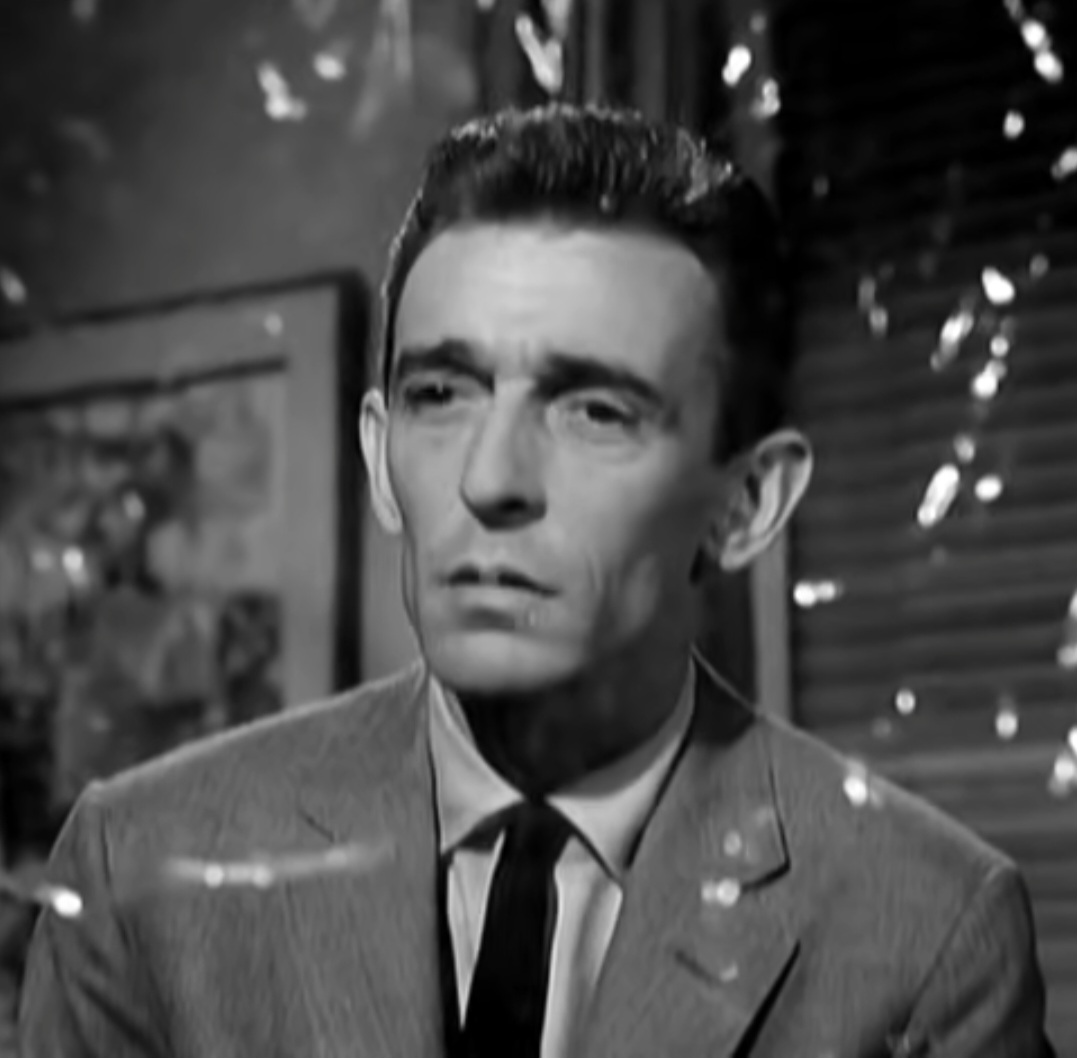
- Sandy Kenyon in an episode of One Step Beyond (1959)
- Born: Sanford Klein; August 5, 1922; New York City, U.S.
- Died: February 20, 2010 (aged 87); Los Angeles, California, U.S.
- Occupation: Actor
- Years active: 1949–2010

Sandy Kenyon (born Sanford Klein; August 5, 1922 – February 20, 2010) was an American actor of film and television. He appeared as a guest actor on numerous television series, including a recurring role on the 1961 TV series, The Americans. He was also the original voice of Jon Arbuckle, voicing the character in the first Garfield special Here Comes Garfield.

== Early years ==
Kenyon was born in The Bronx, New York, and served as a pilot in the U.S. Army Air Forces during World War II.

== Career ==
Kenyon co-starred as Des Smith in the syndicated television drama Crunch and Des (1956), and portrayed Cashbox Potter in the syndicated adventure series Major Dell Conway of the Flying Tigers (1951). Among the many television series in which he guest starred are the westerns: The Rifleman, Colt .45, Yancy Derringer, Have Gun - Will Travel, The Tall Man, Gunsmoke, and Bonanza.

In 1960, Kenyon was cast as a pre-presidential Abraham Lincoln in the episode "No Bridge on the River" of the NBC western series, Riverboat. In the story line, Grey Holden (Darren McGavin) sues the railroad when his vessel, the Enterprise, strikes a rail bridge atop the Mississippi River on a dark, stormy night; Lincoln is the attorney representing the railroad. Tyler McVey is cast as a judge and Denver Pyle as Jim Bledsoe.

In 1961, Kenyon was cast in the role of Ritter on The Americans, a 17-episode NBC series about how the American Civil War divided families.

In the 1963-1964 season, Kenyon was cast as Shep Baggott in a recurring role in five episodes of the ABC western series, The Travels of Jaimie McPheeters.

Other series in which Kenyon appeared include: Richard Diamond, Private Detective; The Fugitive; Room for One More; All in the Family; The Dick Van Dyke Show (including the 2004 reunion special "159th Episode"); That Girl; The Partridge Family; Hogan's Heroes; Adam-12; Kung Fu; Peter Gunn; Quincy, M.E.; Knots Landing; Designing Women and The Twilight Zone.

In the film MacArthur (1977), he portrays General Jonathan M. Wainwright, who survived spending most of World War II in a Japanese POW camp. His other films included Al Capone (1959); Easy Come, Easy Go (1967); Tom Sawyer (1973); Breezy (1973); When Time Ran Out (1980); The Loch Ness Horror (1981); Lifepod (1981); and Down on Us (1984).

He voiced Jon Arbuckle in the first Garfield animated television special, Here Comes Garfield.

== Stage productions ==
Kenyon performed in the world premiere stage production of Edna St. Vincent Millay's Conversation at Midnight in Los Angeles, in 1961, in a cast that included James Coburn, Jack Albertson, Eduard Franz, and John Marley. The play opened at the Coronet Theatre, but was so successful that after two months it moved to the larger 550-seat Civic Playhouse, running for 6 months altogether. Robert Gist directed the production by Worley Thorne in association with Susan Davis. Three years later, Gist and Thorne re-created the production, which again included Kenyon, in Broadway's Billy Rose Theatre, where—under-financed, unable to afford promotion, or wait for word-of-mouth to kick in, and lacking the charisma and virtuoso acting of James Coburn—it ran for just eight previews and four performances. Kenyon also appeared in regional theatre in Los Angeles.

== Death ==
Kenyon died of kidney cancer at the age of 87 at his home in Los Angeles.

== Filmography ==
=== Film ===
Year	Title	Role	Notes
1959	Al Capone	Bones Corelli	
1966	Nevada Smith	Clerk in Bank	
1967	Easy Come, Easy Go	Schwartz	
1972	Sweet Kill	Newscaster	
1973	Tom Sawyer	Constable Clemmens	
1973	Breezy	Real Estate Agent	
1975	Rancho Deluxe	Skinny Face	Uncredited
1977	MacArthur	General Wainwright	
1980	When Time Ran Out	Henderson	
1981	Lifepod	Dematte	
1982	The Loch Ness Horror	Professor George Sanderson	
1984	Down on Us	Alex Stanley	
1984	Blame It on the Night	Colonel	
1998	The Scottish Tale	Arthur Golding	
2008	The Onion Movie	Alzheimers Guy in Crowd	
2009	Little Fish, Strange Pond	Elderly Man	(final film role)

=== Television ===
Year	Title	Role	Notes
1950	Lux Video Theatre	Coastguardsman; Fireman #1	Episode: "Shadow on the Heart"; Episode: "The Token"
1951	The Philco Television Playhouse		Episode: "Rescue"; Episode: "Women of Intrigue"
1952	Hallmark Hall of Fame	Dale Duncan	Episode: "Woman with a Sword"; Episode: "The Last Command"
1952	The Doctor		Episode: "Time to Kill"
1954	Johnny Jupiter		Episode: "The Physical Examination"
1954	Studio One	John Carter	Episode: "An Almanac of Liberty"
1955	Armstrong Circle Theatre		Episode: "Crisis"
1956, 1957	Robert Montgomery Presents		Episode: "Soldier from the Wars Returning"; Episode: "His Name Was Death"
1956, 1957, 1958	The Phil Silvers Show	Man in Box Office Crowd (uncredited); Charlie; Pete Summers	Episode: "The Girl from Italy"; Episode: "The Mess Hall Mess"; Episode: "Bilko the Male Model"
1958	The Silent Service	Charlie; Yeoman Harris	Episode: "The Pargo's Lucky Seventh"; Episode: "The Sandshark Story"
1958	Northwest Passage	Capt. Nathan Hill	Episode: "Break Out"
1958	Yancy Derringer	Willy Nilly	Episode: "An Ace Called Spade"; Episode: "The Saga of Lonesome Jackson"
1958	Steve Canyon	Lt. Michelson	Episode: "Operation Crash Landing"
1958, 1959	Playhouse 90	Billy; The Deputy; Martinson	Episode: "A Town Has Turned to Dust"; Episode: "Old Man"; Episode: "The Tunnel"
1958, 1961, 1963, 1965, 1968	Gunsmoke	Green; Ak; Docker; Bennings; Catlin	Episode: "Stage Hold-Up"; Episode: "Big Man"; Episode: "I Call Him Wonder"; Episode: "The New Society"; Episode: "Lobo"
1959	Rawhide	Storekeeper	Episode: "Incident of the Power and the Plow"
1959	Richard Diamond, Private Detective	Lt. Harry Baker	Episode: "Body of the Crime"; Episode: "Boomerang Bait"
1959	Colt .45		Episode: "The Escape"
1959	The Thin Man	Jim Spyder	Episode: "Nora Goes Over the Wall"
1959	Alcoa Presents: One Step Beyond	Tim Berryman (Reporter)	Episode: "Front Runner"
1959	Alcoa Theatre	Ellsworth Show	Episode: "Goodbye Johnny"; Episode: "Boyden vs. Bunty (Dear Mom, Dear Dad)"; Episode: "The Day the Devil Hid"
1959	Tightrope!	Jeff Stewart	Episode: "Two Private Eyes"
1959	The Big Story	Eddie	Episode: "The Hackie Shakedown"
1959, 1960	Peter Gunn	Ed Mooney; Charlie Barnes	Episode: "The Ugly Frame"; Episode: "Wings of an Angel"
1959, 1960	Riverboat	Jeb Grant; Abraham Lincoln	Episode: "About Roger Mowbray"; Episode: "No Bridge on the River"
1960	The Rifleman	Jim Profit	Episode: "Mail Order Groom"
1960	The Chevy Mystery Show	Eddie	Episode: "Thunder of Silence"
1960, 1961	Have Gun – Will Travel	Rio Jones; Orator Oudry; Jeb Turner	Episode: "Fight at Adobe Wells"; Episode: "Out at the Old Ball Park"; Episode: "Squatter's Rights"
1961	The Americans	Ritter	Episode: "The Regular"; Episode: "On to Richmond"
1961	Gunslinger	Willoughby	Episode: "Zone"
1961	The Tall Man	Sam Nayfack	Episode: "An Item for Auction"
1961, 1962	Dr. Kildare	Dr. William Galdi	Episode: "Winter Harvest"; Episode: "The Horn of Plenty"
1961, 1963	The Twilight Zone	Navigator Hatch; Frank Henderson; The Attendant	Episode: "The Odyssey of Flight 33"; Episode: "The Shelter"; Episode: "Valley of the Shadow"
1962	Cain's Hundred	Waldo	Episode: "Take a Number: Jack Garsell"
1962	Thriller	Mason	Episode: "The Hollow Watcher"
1962	Room for One More	Bruce	Episode: "Our Man in Brazil"
1962	Checkmate	George Diedrich	Episode: "The Someday Man"
1962	The Law and Mr. Jones	Wally Dawson	Episode: "What Can You Learn from Smoke Signals?"
1962	Sam Benedict	Hank	Episode: "Hannigan"
1962	Wide Country	Walt	Episode: "The Royce Bennett Story"
1962, 1965	The Dick Van Dyke Show	Doctor; Allergist; Lionel Dann; Policeman; Cox	Episode: "The Attempted Marriage"; Episode: "Gesundheit, Darling"; Episode: "Baby Fat"; Episode: "Br-rooom, Br-rooom"; Episode: "You're Under Arrest"
1963	The Eleventh Hour	Jason Criley	Episode "The Bride Wore Pink"
1963, 1964	The Travels of Jaimie McPheeters	Shep Baggott	Episode: "The Day of Leaving"; Episode: "The Day of the Flying Dutchman"; Episode: "The Day of the Pawnees"; Episode: "The Day of the Picnic"
1963, 1964	The Great Adventure	Capt. James; Fletcher; Lt. Gators	Episode: "The Story of Nathan Hale"; Episode: "The Colonel from Connecticut"; Episode: "Escape"
1963, 1964	Death Valley Days	Plowman; Spencer	Episode: "With Honesty and Integrity"; Episode: "The Quiet and the Fury"
1963, 1967, 1968, 1970, 1971	The Virginian	Professor; Bert Robinson; Ben Robbins; Rafe Ogden; Constable Stokes	Episode: "The Fatal Journey"; Episode: "The Girl on the Pinto"; Episode: "Image of an Outlaw"; Episode: "Holocaust"; Episode: "The Politician"
1964	The Outer Limits	Prof. Henry Craif	Episode: "Counterweight"
1964	Profiles in Courage	Daniel Webster	Episode: "Daniel Webster"
1964, 1965	The Fugitive	Sheriff Morris; Kyle	Episode: "Angels Travel on Lonely Roads"; Episode: "Corner of Hell"
1964, 1970	Bonanza	Charlie Gibson; Eliah Meek	Episode: "Square Deal Sam"; Episode: "Caution: Easter Bunny Crossing"
1965	The Wild Wild West	Hugo	Episode: "Sudden Death"
1965	Gomer Pyle - U.S.M.C.	Army Sergeant	Episode: "Gomer Un-Trains a Dog"
1965	Convoy	Dr. Reece	Episode: "The Heart of an Enemy"
1966	A Man Called Shenandoah	Matthew Crawson	Episode: "Run, Killer, Run"
1966	The Donna Reed Show	Clerk	Episode: "Do It Yourself Donna"
1966	Gidget	Rick Farmer	Episode: "Gidget's Career"
1966, 1967	Love on a Rooftop	Jim Lucas	Episode: "My Husband, the Knight"; Episode: "The Six Dollar Surprise"; Episode: "The Fifty Dollar Misunderstanding"; Episode: "King of the Castle"; Episode: "One Too Many Cooks"
1966, 1967	The Andy Griffith Show	George Hollander	Episode: "Goober Makes History"; Episode: "Opie Steps Up in Class"
1966, 1967, 1969, 1971	Hogan's Heroes	Maj. Hans Kuehn; Col. Bessler; SS Maj. Bock; Capt. Bohrmann; Col. Hauptmann	Episode: "The 43rd, a Moving Story"; Episode: "Don't Forget to Write"; Episode: "Hot Money"; Episode: "The Big Picture"; Episode: "Klink for the Defense"
1967	I Spy	Barnes	Episode: "Casanova from Canarsie"
1967	The Invaders	Alien Leader	Episode: "The Saucer"
1967, 1969	Judd for the Defense	Bernard Sandrow; Sgt. Shanley	Episode: "A Civil Case of Murder"; Episode: "Borderline Girl"
1967, 1969	That Girl	Ed Burns; Mr. Becker	Episode: "Pass the Potatoes, Ethel Merman"; Episode: "Mission Improbable"
1968	Something for a Lonely Man	Bleeck	TV movie
1970	The Name of the Game	Goldstone	Episode: "The Other Kind of Spy"
1970	The Bold Ones: The New Doctors	Peterson	Episode: "This Will Really Kill You"
1970	The Most Deadly Game	Dr. Fred Herbert	Episode: "Breakdown"
1970	Bracken's World	George Rennick	Episode: "Nude Scene"
1970	Ironside	Bucky Crawford; Kinney	Episode: "Eden Is the Place We Leave"; Episode: "Blackout"
1970, 1972	The Doris Day Show	Randolph; Zeke Kraley	Episode: "A Woman's Intuition"; Episode: "There's a Horse Thief in Every Family Tree"
1970, 1973	Mannix	Hammel; Liquor Store Owner	Episode: "A Chance at the Roses"; Episode: "The Gang's All Here"
1971	The Partridge Family	Father	Episode: "Road Song"
1971	The Mod Squad	Bert Petrie	Episode: "Exit the Closer"
1971, 1975, 1978	All in the Family	Dave the Cop; Jim Kitchener; Herb	Episode: "Archie Is Worried About His Job"; Episode: "Archie the Hero"; Episode: "Bogus Bills"
1972	Me and the Chimp	Cop #2	Episode: "My Pet, the Thief"
1972, 1974	Cannon	Matt Seaver; Oscar	Episode: "A Long Way Down"; Episode: "Photo Finish"
1972, 1978	Insight	Bert; Manager	Episode: "Killer"; Episode: "The Flawed Magi"
1973	The New Dick Van Dyke Show	Sgt. Mulvaney	Episode: "Pot Luck"
1973	The Streets of San Francisco	Roy Chaffee	Episode: "A Room with a View"
1973	The Delphi Bureau	McIntyre	Episode: "The Day of Justice Project"
1973	Columbo	Harris	Episode: "Candidate for Crime"
1973, 1976	Barnaby Jones	Benjamin Wright; Walter Gideon	Episode: "Echo of a Murder"; Episode: "Silent Vendetta"
1974	Kung Fu	Sheriff	Episode: "The Gunman"
1974	Dusty's Trail	Virgil	Episode: "Wizard of Ooze"
1974	A Case of Rape	Mike Bracken	TV movie
1974	Petrocelli	Morrow	Episode: "Music to Die By"
1974	Apple's Way	Al Werner	Episode: "The Flag"
1974	Adam-12	Jack Tennison	Episode: "Excessive Force"
1974	The Rookies	Officer Bell	Episode: "Take Over"
1975	Barbary Coast	Sorensen	Episode: "Irish Luck"
1975	Happy Days	Uncle Tom	Episode: "Three on a Porch"
1976	Maude	Fred	Episode: "Walter's Stigma"
1976	The Rockford Files	Mitchell	Episode: "Joey Blue Eyes"
1976	M*A*S*H	Master Sgt. Woodruff	Episode: "Lt. Radar O'Reilly"
1976	Wonderbug	Holloway	Episode: "The Not So Great Race"
1977	The Last Hurrah	Kane	TV movie
1977	The Bionic Woman	Dr. Yvon Sanders	Episode: "Max"
1977	Police Woman	Fowler	Episode: "Screams"
1978	What's Happening!!	Mr. Davidson	Episode: "Going, Going, Gong"
1978	The Waltons	Willis	Episode: "The Return"
1978, 1979	Lou Grant	Eddie Talbert	Episode: "Sports"; Episode: "Gambling"
1980	Eight Is Enough	Joe Jackson	Episode: "Strike"
1981	Meeting of Minds	Adam Smith	Episode: "Margaret Sanger/Mahatma Gandhi/Adam Smith"
1982	Quincy, M.E.	Capt. McKenna	Episode: "Smoke Screen"
1982	Here Comes Garfield	Jon Arbuckle (voice)	TV special
1982	Hart to Hart	Louis	Episode: "A Christmas Heart"
1984, 1985	Knots Landing	Reverend Kathrun	8 episodes
1985	Airwolf	Reverend	Episode: "Natural Born"
1985	The Romance of Betty Boop	Uncle Mischa Bubbles (voice)	TV special
1985	Crazy Like a Fox	Max Harding	Episode: "Desert Fox"
1988	Sledge Hammer!	Hearing Chairman	Episode: "It Happened What Night?"
1988	War and Remembrance	Ed Flynn	Episode: "Part IV"; Episode: "Part V"
1989	Designing Women	Bud Frazier	Episode: "Odell"
1990	Good Grief		Episode: "Mooses, Masons, and the Secret Life of Trees"
1994	Garfield and Friends	Additional voice	Episode: "The Suburban Jungle/The Thing in the Box/The Feline Philosopher"
1998	Beyond Belief: Fact or Fiction	Mr. Mumbles	Episode: "The Wall/The Chalkboard/The Getaway/The Prescription/Summer Camp"
