= The Loch Ness Horror =

- Theatrical poster for The Loch Ness Horror
- Directed by: Larry Buchanan
- Written by: Larry Buchanan; Lynn Shubert
- Produced by: Irvin Berwick; Jane Buchanan; Larry Buchanan; John F. Rickert
- Starring: Sandy Kenyon; Miki MacKenzie; Barry Buchanan; Eric Scott
- Cinematography: Robert Ebinger
- Edited by: Randy Buchanan
- Music by: Richard H. Theiss
- Production company: Omni-Leisure
- Distributed by: M&M Films
- Release date: May 14, 1982
- Running time: 89 minutes
- Country: United States
- Language: English

The Loch Ness Horror is a 1981 independent monster movie directed by Larry Buchanan. The film was written by Buchanan and Lyn Schubert.

== Plot ==
The Loch Ness Monster is feeding on unsuspecting swimmers and eventually goes on a killing spree. There are three subplots: the monster's egg that is ready to hatch, a scientist who wants to capture the beast, and a mysterious sunken Nazi bomber plane which the military is trying to cover up. A Scottish scientist, George Sanderson, finds help from an American sonic expert, Spencer Dean, to team up and hunt for the monster. Along the journey, Spencer falls in love with Kathleen Stuart, the daughter of the first person to photograph the monster, Jack Stuart. As these events are happening, a rival scientist, Professor Pratt, and his team are searching for the monster as well. Professor Pratt and his team end up finding a sunken World War II German bomber before retrieving the monster's egg. Although Professor Pratt and his team successfully retrieve the egg, the monster ends up killing his assistants. While Spencer and Sanderson attempt to locate the monster, Professor Pratt kidnaps Kathleen and the monster goes on a killing spree in an attempt to get her egg back. The monster's efforts are not successful; the monster is blown up, but her eggs are left to survive.

== Cast ==
- Sandy Kenyon as George Sanderson
- Miki MacKenzie as Kathleen Stuart
- Eric Scott as Brad
- Barry Buchanan as Spencer Dean
- Karey Louis-Scott as Fran
- Doc Livingston as Jack Stuart
- Stuart Lancaster as Professor Pratt
- Preston Hanson as Colonel Laughton
- Garth Pillsbury as Sergeant Derek

== Production ==
The film was made on an infamously low budget and on location at Lake Tahoe, California, whose surrounding countryside passes poorly for Scotland. The firearms used were 1 Colt Python and 2 M16s.

== Release ==
It was released on May 14, 1982.

== Reception ==
The limited release of this motion picture was poorly received.

The Loch Ness Horror is a 1981 horror movie directed by Larry Buchanan, who had a reputation for helming poorly-made films and even proclaiming himself the "schlockmeister".

The film is infamous for its poor special effects, meandering story, awful use of California doubling for Scotland and the fact that, as with almost all of his films, Larry Buchanan uses members of his family both in front of the camera and behind it, whether they are suited to the task or not. The Nessie puppet (just a head on a stick) was later used as Jack the Ripper in one of the "Bullshit or Not?" segments in Amazon Women on the Moon.

== See also ==
- The Crater Lake Monster
- The Loch Ness Monster
