= Lifepod (1981 film) =

- Directed by: Bruce Bryant
- Written by: Bruce Bryant; Carol Johnsen
- Produced by: James Castle
- Starring: Joe Penny; Kristine DeBell; Carl Lumbly; Sandy Kenyon; Jordan Michaels; Christopher Cary
- Cinematography: Steve Dubin
- Edited by: Don Zirpola
- Music by: Robert Emenegger
- Production company: Castle/Bryant Film
- Distributed by: Golden Key Entertainment
- Release date: 1981
- Running time: 90 minutes
- Country: United States
- Language: English

Lifepod is a 1981 American science fiction thriller film starring Joe Penny, Kristine DeBell, Carl Lumbly and Sandy Kenyon. It was produced by James Castle.

== Plot ==
The story is set in 2191. The latest spaceliner for the Whitestar Lines is the Arcturus, on its maiden voyage. On its approach to Callisto, for unknown reasons, the spaceship's computer, the Main Cerebral, declares an emergency and orders "Abandon ship." Most of the crew and passengers leave in lifepods. Captain Montaine stays on the bridge. Main Cerebral begins to evacuate the ship's compartments of oxygen. Third astrogator G.W. Simmons is caught on deck 16 while it still retains an atmosphere. He runs into Fiona Harrison, a passenger from deck 15, who did not leave with the others because she went back for her bird, Dwayne. Because life support has been shut down for all the decks below, Simmons and Fiona head to the bridge via an elevator. When the doors open on deck 1, they are met by news reporter Roz Keshah from level 3, who is wearing a tiny, discrete, head-mounted optical display/camera (predictive of Google Glass). He has found two people, Whitestar Lines director and major stockholder Lloyd DeMatte and his companion the Lady Lima.

On the biobridge, the five meet Captain Montaine, who is accosted by DeMatte and accused of damaging the Arcturus. The captain explains the situation, then offers an escape tunnel to a lifepod. He remains behind, out of duty as the captain and also a strong sense of curiosity. Fiona accidentally leaves behind Dwayne, who becomes a sort of companion for the captain.

Simmons takes command of lifepod #3; DeMatte attempts to hijack it and is killed in the process. It is revealed that the Arcturus was intended as an interstellar vessel but repurposed for economic reasons by financial-criminal DeMatte. Also, the Main Cerebral is discovered to be the former intended pilot of the interstellar Arcturus, rendered an amnesiac and made cyber-controller of the interplanetary Arcturus by DeMatte; memory restored, he launches the Arcturus on a flight to Sirius, accompanied by Captain Montaine.

== Cast ==
- Joe Penny as G.W. Simmons
- Kristine DeBell as Fiona Harrison
- Carl Lumbly as Roz Keshah
- Sandy Kenyon as Lloyd DeMatte
- Jordan Michaels as Lima
- Christopher Cary as Captain Montaine
- Neil Ross as Main Cerebral (voice)
