= Alain de Cadenet =

British racing driver (1945–2022)

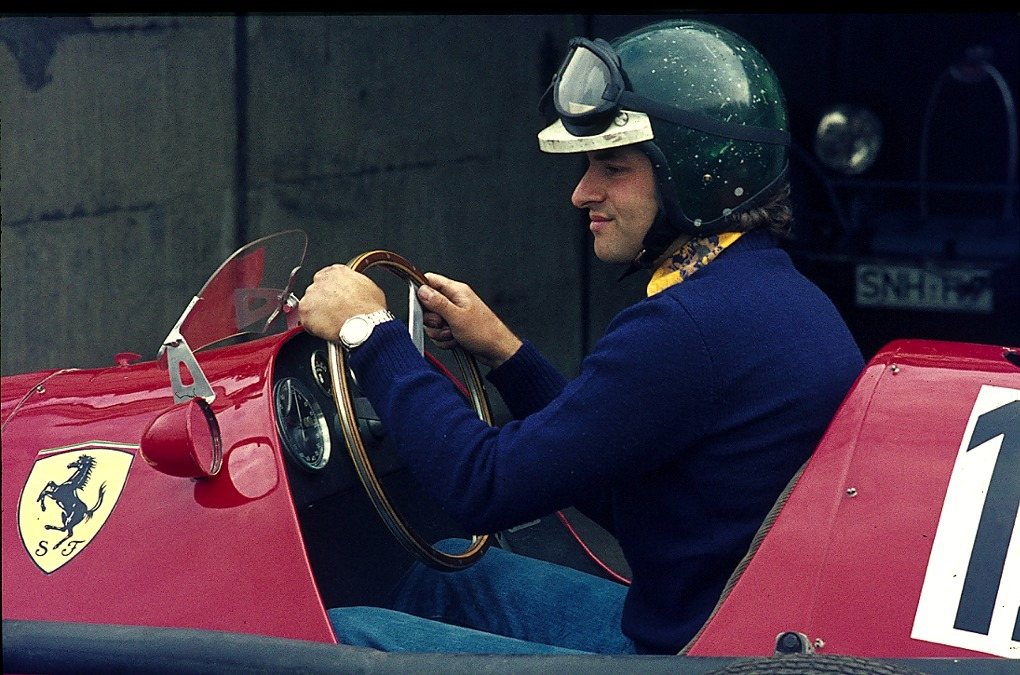
- Born: 27 November 1945
- Died: 1 July 2022 (aged 76)
- Occupations: Television presenter and racing driver
- Spouses: Anna Gerrard; Alison Larmon
- Children: 3, including Alexander and Amanda

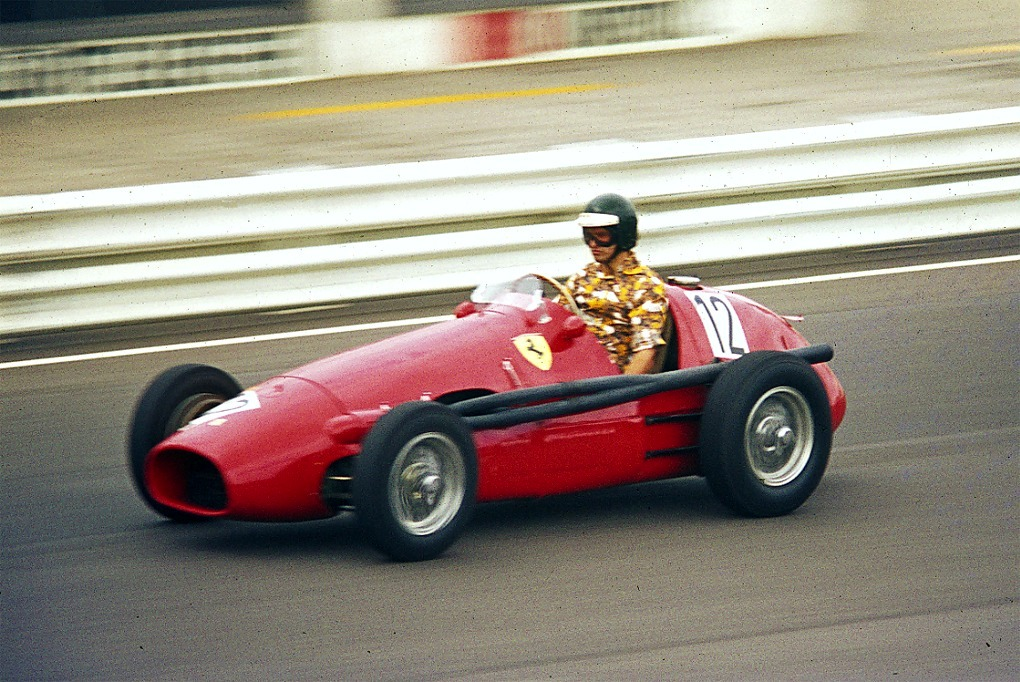
De Cadenet driving a Ferrari

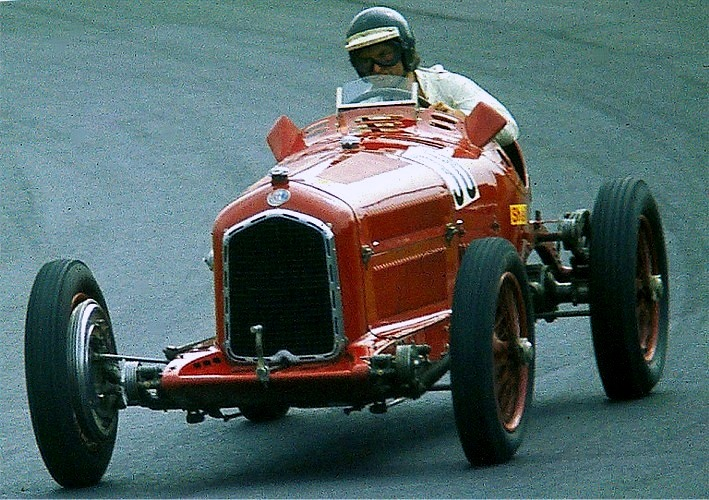
Driving an Alfa Romeo P3

Alain de Cadenet (27 November 1945 – 1 July 2022) (Note: There is some confusion with de Cadenet's date of death. Most sources indicate that de Cadenet died on 2 July 2022. However, The Times and The Telegraph reported that he died on 1 July 2022.) was an English television presenter and racing driver. He was noted for racing in 15 editions of the 24 Hours of Le Mans during the 1970s and 1980s, achieving one podium finish with third place in 1976.

== Early life ==
De Cadenet was born on 27 November 1945, the son of Maxime de Cadenet, a lieutenant or a film technician in the French Air Force, and his English first wife, Valerie (née Braham), who occasionally acted in Hollywood. According to The Times, he "claimed that his French ancestors had fought with Charlemagne in the 9th century". As a baby he and his family were abandoned by his father. He attended Framlingham College in Suffolk. Although he studied to become a barrister, he did not pursue the profession. He first worked as a fashion and music photographer for Radio Caroline and Wonderful Radio London.

== Career ==
De Cadenet decided to pursue racing after attending a race meeting at Brands Hatch in which his friend was participating. He made his reputation building and driving his own sports prototypes, taking on works teams and occasionally beating them. After a life-threatening accident at the Targa Florio, he first raced at the 24 Hours of Le Mans in 1971 driving a Ferrari 512M. A year later, he persuaded Duckhams Oil to sponsor a car he commissioned Gordon Murray to design for the Le Mans race. He finished 12th overall. De Cadenet later finished third overall at Le Mans in 1976. In 1980, with co-driver Desiré Wilson, he won two rounds of the World Sportscar Championship – the Monza 1000 kilometers and Silverstone six hour events. This was a major achievement in an era of increasing professionalism, when it was very difficult for privateers to defeat larger, better-funded teams that had factory support.

== Later life ==
After retiring from sports car endurance racing, de Cadenet hosted numerous shows and broadcasts for the Speed Channel, ESPN, the Velocity Channel, and the Petrolicious website. He hosted Legends of Motorsport for Speed between 1996 and 2000, as well as the network's coverage of the Goodwood Festival of Speed.

During the 2000s, he was the host of Speed's Victory By Design, in which he drove vintage racing cars and discussed their history. The New York Times described the series as "car pornography". In 2012, de Cadenet hosted Renaissance Man for the Velocity Channel (now called the Motor Trend network), covering cars, motorcycles, the Rolls-Royce Merlin engine and racing at Monaco.

=== Collecting ===
De Cadenet also raced classic and vintage cars, having owned and raced numerous models, particularly Alfa Romeos. In addition to cars, he also collected motorcycles and aircraft, and operated a Supermarine Spitfire. A video on the Internet shows a clip from a documentary in which a Spitfire flies extremely low over his head. He was also a collector and authority on George V stamps, and advised the Royal Mail on their collection.

== Personal life ==
De Cadenet's first marriage was to Anna Gerrard, an interior designer and model. Together, they had two children: Alexander and Amanda. They eventually divorced. He later married Alison Larmon, with whom he had a son. They remained married until his death.

De Cadenet died on 1 July 2022. He was 76, and suffered from cholangiocarcinoma prior to his death. He was buried at the Putney Vale Cemetery; his grave is alongside pre-war racing driver Richard Seaman.

== Official results ==
=== 24 Hours of Le Mans ===
Year	Team	Co-Drivers	Car	Class	Laps	Pos.	Class Pos.
1971	(Belgium) Ecurie Francorchamps	(Belgium) Baron Hughes de Fierlandt	Ferrari 512M	S 5.0	235	DNF	DNF
1972	(United Kingdom) Duckham's Oil Motor Racing	(United Kingdom) Chris Craft	Duckhams LM72 Ford-Cosworth	S 3.0	288	12th	5th
1973	(United Kingdom) Duckham's Oil Motor Racing	(United Kingdom) Chris Craft	Duckhams LM72 Ford-Cosworth	S 3.0	81	DNF	DNF
1975	(United Kingdom) Alain de Cadenet	(United Kingdom) Chris Craft	De Cadenet-Lola T380 Ford-Cosworth	S 3.0	291	14th	5th
1976	(United Kingdom) Alain de Cadenet	(United Kingdom) Chris Craft	De Cadenet-Lola T380 Ford-Cosworth	S 3.0	338	3rd	3rd
1977	(United Kingdom) Alain de Cadenet	(United Kingdom) Chris Craft	De Cadenet-Lola T380 Ford-Cosworth	S 2.0	315	5th	3rd
1978	(United Kingdom) Alain de Cadenet	(United Kingdom) Chris Craft	De Cadenet-Lola T380 Ford-Cosworth	S 2.0	273	15th	6th
1979	(United Kingdom) Alain de Cadenet	(France) François Migault	De Cadenet-Lola T380 Ford-Cosworth	S 2.0	10	DNF	DNF
1980	(United Kingdom) Alain de Cadenet	(France) François Migault	De Cadenet-Lola LM Ford-Cosworth	S 2.0	313	7th	3rd
1981	(United Kingdom) Alain de Cadenet (Belgium) Belga	(Belgium) Jean-Michel Martin (Belgium) Philippe Martin	De Cadenet-Lola LM Ford-Cosworth	S +2.0	210	DNF	DNF
1982	(United Kingdom) Grid Racing	(South Africa) Desiré Wilson (Spain) Emilio de Villota	Grid Plaza S1 Ford-Cosworth	C	7	DNF	DNF
1983	(France) Primagaz	(France) Yves Courage (France) Michel Dubois	Cougar C01B Ford-Cosworth	C	86	DNF	DNF
1984	(United Kingdom) Charles Ivey Racing	(United Kingdom) Chris Craft (Australia) Allan Grice	Porsche 956B	C1	274	DNF	DNF
1985	(France) Primagaz Team Cougar (France) Compagnie Primagaz	(France) Yves Courage (France) Jean-François Yvon	Cougar C12 Porsche	C1	279	20th	15th
1986	(France) Primagaz Team Cougar	(France) Yves Courage (France) Pierre-Henri Raphanel	Cougar C12 Porsche	C1	267	18th	11th
