= Robyn Cohen =

American actress

- Occupations: Film, television, stage actress

Robyn Cohen is an American actress best known for her role as Anne Marie Sakowitz, the sunbathing script supervisor in Wes Anderson's The Life Aquatic with Steve Zissou.

== Early life ==
Throughout her teenage years, she attended summer acting programs at Interlochen Performing Arts Camp, Carnegie Mellon University and Northwestern University before taking her senior year of high school to tour with the Broadway musical revival of Cabaret. She subsequently earned her B.F.A. from the Juilliard School.

After performing in A Christmas Carol at The Ford's Theater in Washington D.C. she moved to Los Angeles, where she began studying acting with Robert Carnegie at Playhouse West School and Repertory Company.

== Career ==
Cohen became a teacher at Playhouse West in 2006, as well as a team teacher with Jeff Goldblum in their master class program.

In 2014, she became an instructor at James Franco's acting school, Studio 4.

In addition to Wes Anderson's The Life Aquatic (opposite Bill Murray), some of her film credits are The Celestine Prophecy, Road Hard, Zzyzx, Beau Jest, Bedeviled and James Franco's films Sal, Good Time Max, Fools Gold and Bukowski.

In television, she was a series regular on Gravity for Starz network and has also appeared on such shows as Cristela, The Mentalist, The Defenders, NCIS, Invasion, The Closer, NCIS: Los Angeles, The Strand, Starved (recurring), LAX, and others.

In 2012, she was seen onstage at The Falcon Theater with Melanie Griffith and Scott Caan in his world premiere play No Way Around but Through. Cohen also appeared in the world premiere of Jon Jory's adaptation of Tom Jones at the Actors Theatre of Louisville in 2013. She then performed title roles in the repertory season for The Great Lakes Theatre and Idaho Shakespeare Festival throughout their 2015 season.

Some of her additional Los Angeles stage credits include the West Coast premieres of The Exonerated opposite Jeff Goldblum, and Neil Labute's The Shape of Things at The Laguna Playhouse. She performed in The Grand Tour (under Jerry Herman's tutelage at The Colony Theatre), The Long Beach Playhouse (in Proof), The Ape and Brief Encounters (with James Franco at Playhouse West), as well as productions with The Blank Theater Company, Circle X, Theater 40, The Victory Theatre Center, Vs. Theater, and The Dorothy Chandler Pavilion at the Los Angeles Music Center in Rigoletto.

Additionally, Cohen has performed in New York and regionally with Lincoln Center, Ford's Theatre, The Goodspeed Opera House, The Idaho Shakespeare Festival, The Paper Mill Playhouse, The North Shore Music Theater, The Sacramento Light Opera, The Bucks County Playhouse, The Poconos Playhouse and with dozens of theaters around North America while touring with the musical revival of Cabaret.

She has appeared in over 75 commercials. She worked again with Wes Anderson as a hamster in the 2005 Dasani water television commercials.

In 2015, she directed the play Tape by Stephen Belber, and prior to that directed 27 Wagons Full of Cotton by Tennessee Williams, and Hello out There by William Saroyan.

== Personal life ==
In December 2012, she was awarded over $17 million in a lawsuit against Los Angeles Clippers owner Donald Sterling after losing most of her belongings in an apartment fire at a West Hollywood building owned by Sterling. This award was later overturned by a judge on appeal. She now lives in Studio City.
