= Kate Shepherd =

American artist based in New York City (born 1961)

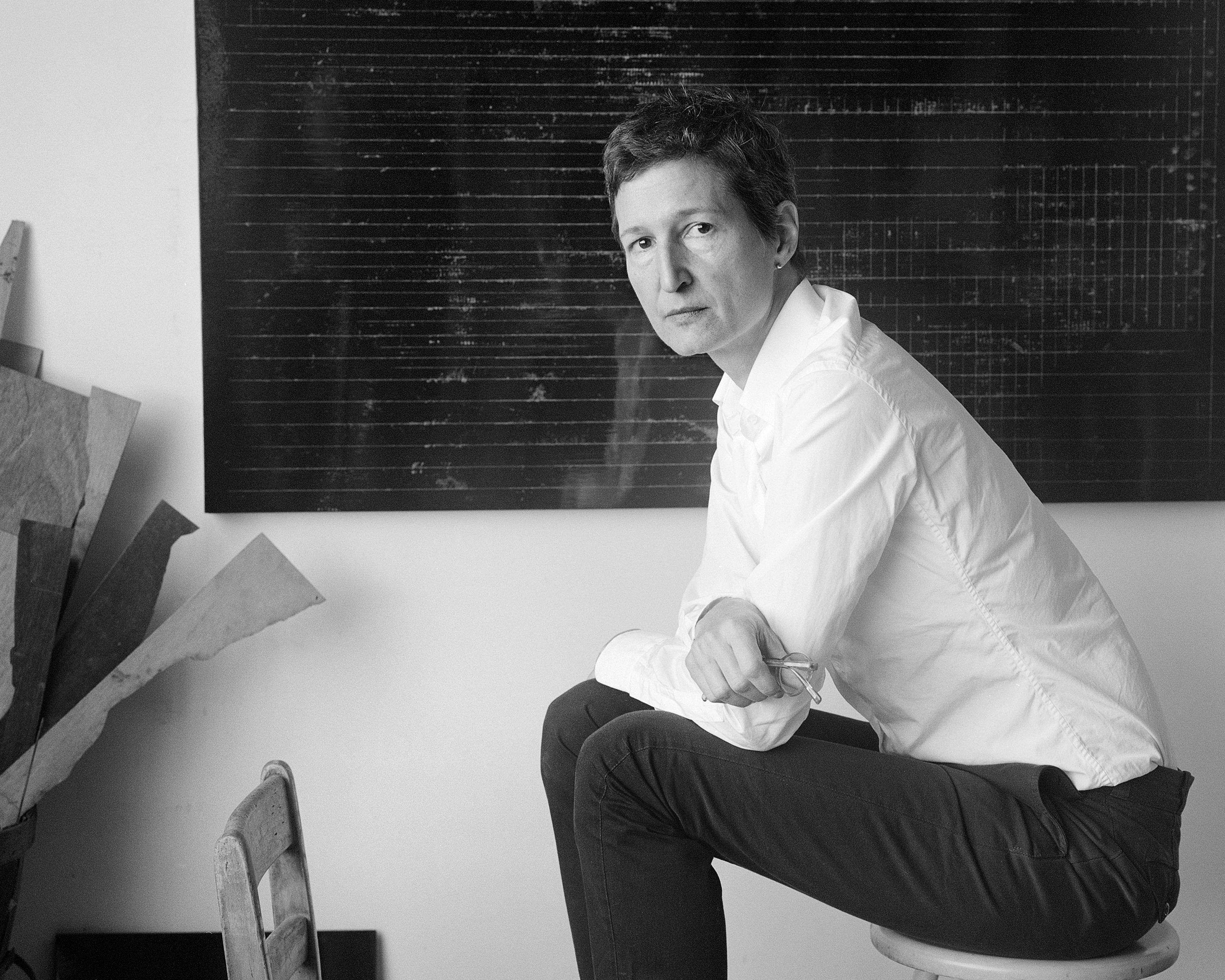
- Born: 1961 (age 64–65); New York City, US
- Education: School of Visual Arts, NY (MFA); Oberlin College, OH (BA); Skowhegan School of Painting and Sculpture, ME
- Known for: Painting; Abstract art; Perceptual art; Geometric abstraction
- Parent(s): Suzanne Shepherd and David Shepherd (producer)]
- Awards: 2026 Fellowship John Simon Guggenheim Memorial Foundation
- Website: kateshepherd.com

Kate Shepherd (born 1961) is an American artist based in New York City.Her work in painting, printmaking, drawing and sculpture, investigates spatial perception through abstract means.Known for creating the optical illusion of three dimensional space on planar surfaces,her reflective monochrome paintings and wall murals, are minimalist compositions of line, color and geometric forms.Shepherd is represented by Galerie Lelong in the United States and France;Anthony Meier Fine Art, CA; Josh Pazda Hiram Butler, TX; and Krakow Witkin Gallery, MA.

== Education ==
Shepherd completed her B.A. from Oberlin College in Oberlin, Ohio, in 1982. Her formal training in design at the Institute for Architecture and Urban Studies, New York, and subsequent studies at Skowhegan School of Painting and Sculpture, inform her decades-long exploration of perspectival space. During the early stage of her artistic career Shepherd earned a living by painting portraits and creating drawings for The New Yorker. She obtained an M.F.A. from the School of Visual Arts, NY, where she received the Paula Rhodes Award for exceptional achievement(1992)

== Career ==
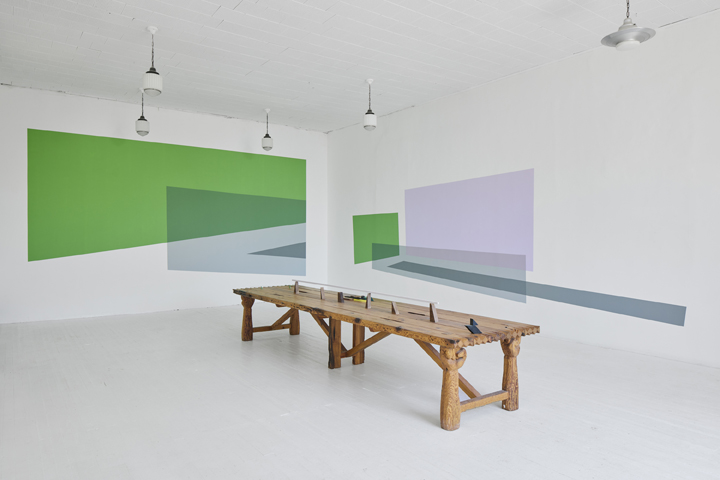
Kate Shepherd, "All In", 2025, Benjamin Moore paint on wall, Do Right Hall, Marfa,Texas

Shepherd's work draws attention to figure-ground relationships through exploration of line, color and form. She is known for layered enamel paintings with a mirror-like surface that interacts with light and architectural space.

Shepherd is the recipient of the 2026 John Simon Guggenheim Memorial Foundation Fellowship for Fine Arts. Shepherd was the inaugural Fellow at the Lannan Foundation (1991). Additional artist in residence honors include the MacDowell Fellowship (1993-1994,1998);Chinati Foundation Residency (1995) and the Dora Maar Fellowship, 2026.

In 2005 Shepherd was awarded the Lab Grant Program Residency at Dieu Donné Paper Mill in New York, where she presented the solo exhibition, “Schroeder Practices” (2008) and in the same year received the Jill Marino Fellowship, Publishing Residency at the Lower East Side Printshop.

== Personal life ==
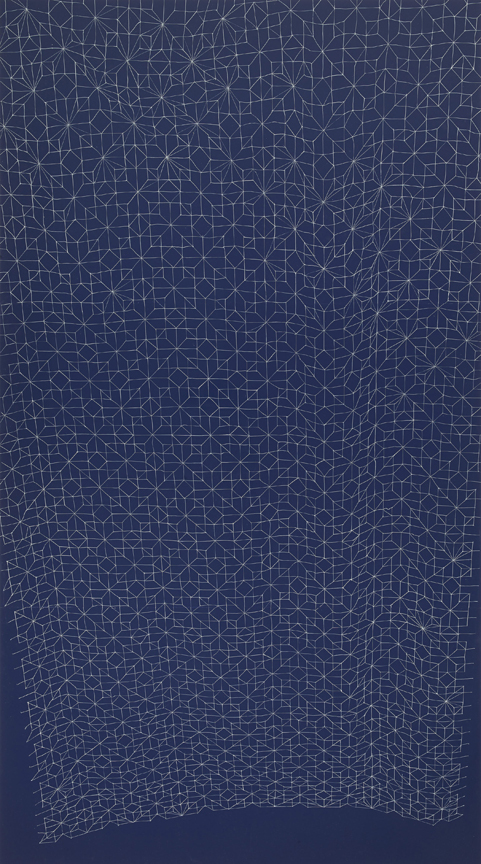
Kate Shepherd, "Goodnight", 2009, oil and enamel on panel

Kate Shepherd is the daughter of actress and acting teacher Suzanne Shepherd and David Shepherd (producer), director, and actor noted for his innovative work in improvisational theatre.

== Exhibitions ==
The Phillips Collection, in Washington D.C., invited Shepherd to create work in response to paintings held in the museum’s collection. The resulting solo exhibition, “Intersections: Relation to and yet not (homage to Mondrian)” engaged with Piet Mondrian’s palette of primary colors and vocabulary of geometric forms.

Since 1991 Shepherd has been represented by Galerie Lelongin the United States and France, where she has presented numerous solo exhibitions. “Surveillance” (2020) and “ABC and sometimes Y” (2024) focused on perceptual interaction between art, viewer, and architecture. Galerie Lelong published the monograph Kate Shepherd: Lineaments, 2015 on the occasion of Shepherd's solo exhibition at the Charlotte and Philip Hanes Art Gallery, Wake Forest University, NC.

Hiram Butler Gallery in Houston, Texas, has exhibited Shepherd’s work since 2014. “Chunks” (2015), a solo exhibition, featured a silk screen print series inspired by Johann Goethe’s Theory of Colours (1810). In 2020, during the COVID-19 pandemic, Shepherd presented “April, May, June, etc., etc., Upended Floor (mud, blood),” at the gallery. Due to social distancing health protocols, the installation could only be viewed from outside. The Trompe-l'œil mural, painted directly on the gallery wall, interrogated relationships between body and space.

== Museum Collections ==
- Allen Memorial Art Museum, Oberlin College, Ohio
- Art Institute of Chicago, Illinois
- Buffalo AKG Art Museum, New York
- Los Angeles County Museum of Art, California
- The Menil Collection, Texas
- Metropolitan Museum of Art, New York
- Museum of Fine Arts, Boston, Massachusetts
- The Phillips Collection, Washington D.C.
- Seattle Art Museum, Washington
