= Starved =

2005 American television sitcom

- The main characters from left to right: Billie, Dan, Sam and Adam
- Created by: Eric Schaeffer
- Starring: Eric Schaeffer; Laura Benanti; Del Pentecost; Sterling K. Brown
- Country of origin: United States
- Original language: English
- No. of seasons: 1
- No. of episodes: 7

Production
- Executive producers: Eric Schaeffer; Dan Pasternack
- Producer: Daniel Hank
- Production locations: New York City, New York
- Editor: Ken Eluto
- Running time: 21-31 minutes
- Production companies: Five Minutes Before the Miracle Productions; Carsey-Werner Productions

Original release
- Network: FX
- Release: August 4 – September 15, 2005

Starved is an American television sitcom that aired for one season on FX for seven episodes in 2005. The series was about four friends who each have eating disorders, who met at a "shame-based" support group called Belt Tighteners. Its characters included those with bulimia, anorexia, and binge eating disorder. Eric Schaeffer created the show as well as writing, starring in and directing it, based upon his own struggle with eating disorders. In addition to his own life experiences, Schaeffer also drew upon the experiences of the other members of the principal cast, each of whom coincidentally had struggled with food issues of their own.

Starved was the lead-in of FX's hour-long "Other Side of Comedy" block with It's Always Sunny in Philadelphia. FX executives wanted to use the two series to begin building comedy programming and broaden the network's demographic. The series debuted on August 4, 2005, to poor critical reviews and was cancelled in October 2005, when FX picked Sunny over Starved for renewal.

== Characters ==
- Sam (Eric Schaeffer) is a commodities trader who has anorexia and compulsive overeating. His interests quickly turn into obsessions. Despite being with several different women during the series, he is secretly in love with Billie.
- Billie Frasier (Laura Benanti) is an anorexic and bulimic who also has issues with alcohol abuse. Billie is bisexual and was raised by two gay fathers. Formerly a ballerina, the original impetus for her eating disorders, she is now a moderately well-known singer-songwriter.
- Dan Roundtree (Del Pentecost) is a novelist and compulsive overeater. The only married person among the main characters, he worries that his weight will lead his wife to leave him. He continually schedules and then cancels gastric bypass surgery.
- Adam Williams (Sterling K. Brown) is a police officer with bulimia. He abuses his authority to extort food from restaurants and delivery people, which eventually costs him his job.
- Belt Tighteners Group Leader (Jackie Hoffman) leads the support group that the friends attend. Sarcastic and abrasive, she constantly berates the four friends for their failed attempts at dealing with their food issues. Following her tirades, she leads the group in a chant of the support group's slogan, "It's not OK!"

== Production ==
Series star Eric Schaeffer created Starved. Schaeffer, who is in recovery for alcohol and drug addiction and describes himself as having "anorexic thinking," drew on his own experiences with eating disorders and the experiences of other people he knew in creating scenarios for the series. Other cast members also struggled with food issues. Benanti spent three years fighting anorexia while she danced on Broadway. Pentecost, who weighed 310 pounds at the time of filming, contributed stories from his own life to the series, including a scene in which his character weighs himself on a postal scale because he is too heavy for a conventional bathroom scale. Brown was fat as a child and describes himself as being "haunted by the 'fat kid mentality'." Producers only discovered that each of the principal cast members had food issues after the casting process was completed.

Starved and It's Always Sunny in Philadelphia were developed for FX under the auspices of FX president John Landgraf, who sought to expand the network's viewership by providing a wider variety of programming. The shows were the network's first attempts at sitcoms following the short-lived 2003 series Lucky. FX at the time was known primarily for its edgy dramatic series. Bruce Lefkowitz, then executive vice president of Fox Cable Entertainment, outlined the strategy: "We kind of staked out a unique space in dramas that are very different from everybody else’s, so the next natural evolution is to do something in the comedy space." The network ordered seven episodes of each series.

Starved was shot in the spring of 2005 in New York City using a single-camera setup and without a laugh track. It and Sunny were the first shows that FX produced inhouse.

== Episodes ==
No.	Title	Directed by	Written by	Original release date
1	"Pilot"	Eric Schaeffer	Eric Schaeffer	August 4, 2005
The four friends attend a Belt Tighteners meeting together. Sam tries to shape his date Sarah into a woman from a commercial, horrifying Billie, who tries to get him to end the relationship. Adam extorts food from a delivery man, then purges it, and Belt Tighteners threatens to expose him to the NYPD if he abuses his authority again. Dan struggles with his decision about gastric bypass surgery. Sam suggests to Sarah that they see other people but when he later learns she's on a date he dumps her.
2	"Please Release Me, Let Me Go"	Eric Schaeffer	Eric Schaeffer	August 11, 2005
Sam, Dan and Adam discuss Sam's anal leakage and Dan suggests Sam go for a colonic. Sam becomes enamored with his hydrotherapist, Stella, and begins dating her. Billie visits her fathers and they argue about her anorexia and sexuality. Frustrated with his wife Amy, Dan hires a submissive at a BDSM dungeon but only makes her stand quietly while he watches football on television. During a colonic, Sam likens Stella to a sex worker. Furious, she leaves him still filling with water until his colonic tube pops out, fountaining colonic water everywhere.
3	"Scrotal Origami"	Eric Schaeffer	Eric Schaeffer	August 18, 2005
Sam accidentally cuts his scrotum while grooming his pubic hair and his testicles swell after he works out. Dan's wife confronts him about his visit to the dungeon and when she throws him out he stays at Adam's. At the gym, Billie becomes obsessed with having a lower body fat percentage than another woman, until she learns that the woman is a cancer patient.
4	"3D"	Eric Schaeffer	Eric Schaeffer	August 25, 2005
Sam goes for an HIV test and meets Heather, the woman from the commercial, and asks her out. Dan cancels his gastric bypass surgery and decides to try a liquid diet, but his "liquid diet" soon comes to include hamburgers and pizzas liquefied in a blender. Adam meets Josh, who can vomit at will, and Josh teaches Adam the trick in a cruisy park restroom. Sam and Heather go to Billie's gig and a drunk Billie seduces Heather backstage. Sam tells Billie he's in love with her but she rejects him.
5	"Thank You, I Love You"	Eric Schaeffer	Eric Schaeffer	September 1, 2005
Billie apologizes to Sam and tells him she doesn't remember what happened backstage. Sam meets a yoga teacher named Shanti online and begins dating her. Billie meets "Cancer Girl" from the gym and they go out on a date. Adam is found out by Internal Affairs but denies an eating disorder. When photos show Adam and Josh at the park bathroom, Adam claims to be gay and makes Dan pretend to be his boyfriend. When Dan admits the truth, Adam is suspended. Dan returns to his wife, while Billie and Sam attend an Alcoholics Anonymous meeting.
6	"Viva la Cucaracha"	Eric Schaeffer	Eric Schaeffer	September 8, 2005
Inspired by Shanti, Sam decides to become vegan. Adam continues to lie about his work situation and his bulimia. Sam clashes with Shanti when he realizes he's gained three pounds eating her vegan cake. Billie and Alison the "Cancer Girl" have a tense dinner with Billie's parents. Dan weighs himself on a postal scale because he is too heavy for a home bathroom scale. He makes another gastric bypass appointment but has a heart attack in the hospital lobby.
7	"The Breatharians"	Eric Schaeffer	Eric Schaeffer	September 15, 2005
Sam becomes a Breatharian, who believe that only air and sunlight are needed for survival. Dan has his jaw wired shut so he won't eat solid food for a month. Adam catches a purse snatcher and beats him senseless. Dan tells the others about Adam's suspension and continued purging, and Sam confronts Adam. Dan's wife threatens to leave him if he doesn't lose weight. At Belt Tighteners, Adam comes clean about his purging, and the four friends are expelled. Sam and Shanti double-date with Billie and Alison, but Sam breaks up with Shanti and confesses his love to Billie, who chooses Alison over Sam. While Sam binges, the other friends attend an Overeaters Anonymous meeting.

== Reception ==
Starved generated controversy even before its premiere. A number of specialists in the treatment of eating disorders expressed concern that the program would either make light of or glamorize eating disorders. Others, however, felt that Starved might focus attention on eating disorders as a serious medical condition. The National Eating Disorders Association called for a boycott of the show and claimed that Diageo (makers of Tanqueray) and Nautilus agreed to pull their advertising. Schaeffer responded to the controversy, saying "there is some difficult stuff to watch. But I know my spirit and intention are good."

Starved premiered to an audience of 1.54 million viewers, scoring a Neilsen rating of 0.8 and a 2 share among adults 18–49, the network's target demographic. Reviews were unfavorable. Variety echoed the slogan of Belt Tighteners in dismissing the series as "not OK." Noting the series' edgy content, Variety allows that "Pushing the envelope in terms of standards is all well and good, assuming that series earn the right to do so." Starved, it says, did not earn that right. The series' "stabs at poignancy feel unconvincing and forced" and "from an emotional standpoint there's seldom a truthful note."

The Washington Post concurred in this assessment, describing the premise of the show as "Hey, what happens if you take the characters from Seinfeld and give them eating disorders?" While crediting Starved for "a few inventive laughs," the language and sexuality of the show are described as "exceptionally coarse" and "outrageous for cable television, even later at night." Worse than these issues, the Post felt that Schaeffer neglected to develop the characters in favor of coming up with contrived situations for them. "[T]his failure to build understanding into the show dooms it to emptiness, with a sour aftertaste. As if you had just, you know, hurled."

The New York Times credited the series for its bold premise and noted that the show provided some insight into eating disorders while offering "a few flashes of clever dialogue and satire." Ultimately, however, the Times found that "Starved relies too heavily on sight gags and gross-out farce." The Los Angeles Times found the show "vexing" for being "at once assured and shallow, accomplished and unconvincing, well-acted and empty." The review singles out Schaeffer's character Sam as "especially unappealing" and points to Schaeffer's roles as creator, producer, writer and director as "an object lesson in the wisdom of a system of checks and balances." Perhaps most damningly, in noting Schaeffer's experiences with addiction, the reviewer writes that "just because you’ve had an experience doesn’t mean you have anything interesting to say about it or are able to articulate whatever interesting thing you have to say."

New York called it the Best Show You Probably Never Watched. NBC used a clip from the second episode in "The Most Outrageous TV Moments".

FX canceled Starved in October 2005. FX president John Landgraf told Variety, "The show had a lot of fans, so it was tough to choose [between it and It's Always Sunny in Philadelphia]. Ultimately, we felt that we're just not in a position to spread our resources. We launched our dramas one at a time, and launching two [comedies] like we did this summer just didn't work out as well." As of 2025, Sunny has been renewed for its eighteenth season on sister network FXX.
