= Fall (1997 film) =

- DVD cover
- Directed by: Eric Schaeffer
- Written by: Eric Schaeffer
- Produced by: Epiphany Pictures; Fall Productions
- Starring: Eric Schaeffer; Amanda de Cadenet
- Music by: Amanda Kravat
- Distributed by: Orion Pictures
- Release date: June 20, 1997 (United States)
- Running time: 93 minutes
- Country: United States
- Language: English
- Budget: $1,000,000 (estimated)

Fall is a 1997 American romantic film directed by, written by and starring Eric Schaeffer, alongside Amanda de Cadenet. The film was followed by a 2011 sequel After Fall, Winter.

== Plot ==
Michael Shiver (Eric Schaeffer) is a cab driver in New York City. One day, supermodel Sarah Easton (Amanda de Cadenet) enters his taxi and they have a brief but intense exchange. A few days later, at a restaurant having dinner with his two close friends, he sees her by chance and they have a short interaction.

The story continues with the two of them becoming interested in each other, discussing their intense attraction and falling in love, all while Sarah's husband is away in Rome. Michael writes her love poems (narrated in Michael's voice) and sends them by fax, and surprises her with romantic gifts such as a thousand roses delivered to her hotel room in Spain, while Sarah is there for a modeling assignment and to visit her husband.

Near the end of the film, Sarah is conflicted, causing a rift between the lovers. Sarah says Michael can't understand her life and that everything happens on his terms. Michael reveals that he was once a successful writer with a novel on the best-seller list, and he had known that life, but did not feel fulfilled by it so he walked away and became a cab driver. Sarah goes back to her husband and Michael sends her his best-selling book, along with a last letter, with Michael reflecting on their affair. The film ends with Michael's narration.

== Cast ==
- Eric Schaeffer - Michael
- Amanda de Cadenet - Sarah
- Rudolf Martin - Phillipe
- Francie Swift - Robin
- Lisa Vidal - Sally
- Roberta Maxwell - Joan Alterman
- Jose Yenque – Scasse
- Scarlett Johansson - Little Girl
