= Too Something =

- Also known as: New York Daze
- Created by: Eric Schaeffer; Efrem Seeger; Donal Lardner Ward
- Starring: Eric Schaeffer; Donal Lardner Ward; Portia de Rossi
- Composer: Mark Mothersbaugh
- Country of origin: United States
- Original language: English
- No. of seasons: 1
- No. of episodes: 22 (13 unaired)

Production
- Camera setup: Multi-camera
- Running time: 30 minutes
- Production company: Warner Bros. Television

Original release
- Network: Fox
- Release: October 1, 1995 – June 23, 1996

Too Something (also known as New York Daze) is an American sitcom that aired on the Fox network in October 1995 and again from May 26 to June 23, 1996.

== Premise ==
The show centered on Eric McDougal, a would-be author, and Donny Reeves, a photographer, who were roommates in Manhattan.

== Contest to rename series ==
The producers ran a contest to rename the series, but it went on hiatus before the show could be renamed. When the series returned in May 1996 its new title was New York Daze and it was introduced by Jeri Dobson of Greensboro, North Carolina who had won the contest, including a trip to Hollywood.

== Cast ==
- Eric Schaeffer as Eric McDougal
- Donal Lardner Ward as Donny Reeves
- Portia de Rossi as Maria Hunter
- Lisa Gerstein as Evelyn
- Larry Poindexter as Henry
- Mindy Seeger as Daisy

== Episodes ==
No.	Title	Directed by	Written by	Original release date	Prod. code
1	"Too Something (Pilot)"	Andrew D. Weyman	Efrem Seeger & Eric Schaeffer & Donal Lardner Ward	October 1, 1995	475099
2	"Maria Moves In"	Steve Zuckerman	Susan Seeger	October 8, 1995	457852
3	"Donny's Exhibit"	Andrew D. Weyman	Donal Lardner Ward & Efrem Seeger	October 15, 1995	457851
4	"Precipice"	John Sgueglia	Patti Harrison	October 22, 1995	457856
5	"Maria Cooks"	Steve Zuckerman	Tom Burkhard	October 29, 1995	457854
6	"Basketball Story"	Steve Zuckerman	Phill Lewis	May 26, 1996	457853
7	"Evelyn's Blouse"	Steve Zuckerman	Eric Weinberg	June 2, 1996	457858
8	"Donny's Mother"	John Sguegila	Efrem Seeger	June 16, 1996	457863
9	"Eric's Book"	Steve Zuckerman	Tom Burkhard & Eric Weinberg	June 23, 1996	457861
10	"Rebound Guy"	Arlene Sanford	N/A	Unaired	457855
11	"The Jacket"	Hal Cooper	N/A	Unaired	457857
12	"Eric's Sister Zoe"	Shelley Jensen	N/A	Unaired	457859
13	"Football Story"	Gail Mancuso	Phill Lewis	Unaired	457860
14	"The Car"	Steve Zuckerman	N/A	Unaired	457862
15	"Eric and Donny Get Pink Slips"	Steve Zuckerman	N/A	Unaired	457864
16	"Money Grubbers"	Steve Zuckerman	N/A	Unaired	457865
17	"Leg, Lies and Videotape"	Steve Zuckerman	N/A	Unaired	457866
18	"The Candidate"	John Sgueglia	N/A	Unaired	457867
19	"The Popcorn Machine"	Henry Winkler	N/A	Unaired	457868
20	"Meter Feeders"	Steve Zuckerman	N/A	Unaired	457869
21	"Foreign Affairs"	Steve Zuckerman	Susan Seeger	Unaired	457870
22	"Pretend You Know Me"	Steve Zuckerman	Perry Rein & Gigi McCreery	Unaired	457871
