= A Bullet for Pretty Boy =

1970 film

- Directed by: Larry Buchanan; Maury Dexter (uncredited)
- Written by: Henry Rosenbaum
- Based on: story by Enrique Touceda; Larry Buchanan
- Produced by: Larry Buchanan
- Starring: Fabian Forte
- Cinematography: James R. Davidson
- Edited by: Miguel Levin
- Music by: Harley Hatcher
- Production company: American International Pictures
- Distributed by: American International Pictures
- Release date: July 15, 1970
- Running time: 88 minutes
- Country: United States
- Language: English
- Budget: $350,000
- Box office: $1,171,000 (US/ Canada rentals)

A Bullet for Pretty Boy is a 1970 American action film from director Larry Buchanan. It stars Fabian Forte as gangster Pretty Boy Floyd and co-stars Jocelyn Lane in her final performance before retiring from acting in 1971.

== Plot ==
Oklahoma farmer Charles Floyd marries Ruby. At the reception, some goons insult Ruby and Charles attacks them. This results in Floyd's father and one of the goons being killed. Floyd is convicted of the crime and sent to work on the chain gang.

Several years later Floyd escapes from prison and takes refuge in a brothel run by Beryl, where prostitute Betty falls for him. Beryl's brother Wallace wants Betty for himself and starts to hate Floyd, giving him the nickname "Pretty Boy".

The brothel is a hangout for Ned Short and his gang of bank robbers. Floyd joins them and becomes a full-fledged criminal.

Floyd returns to Oklahoma to see his wife. They still love each other but she can't be with him because he is now a bank robber.

He then goes on a crime spree with another member of the gang, an old friend called Preacher. Pretty Boy Floyd is eventually killed.

== Cast ==
- Fabian Forte as Pretty Boy Floyd
- Jocelyn Lane as Betty
- Astrid Warner as Ruby
- Adam Roarke as Preacher
- Michael Haynes as Ned
- Robert Glenn as Hossler
- Anne McAdams as Beryl
- Jeff Alexander as Wallace
- Camilla Carr as Helen

== Production ==
Fabian was signed to make the film in June 1969. Filming took place entirely on location in Texas and was completed by October.

The movie had the largest budget ever given to Buchanan. Buchanan later said his "cue" on the film was Woody Guthrie's 'The Ballad of Pretty Boy Floyd,' which examines the populist folk-hero angle of the outlaw. In particular, he was inspired by Woody's great line about how 'some men will rob you with a six-gun, and some will rob you with a fountain pen'."

The film features Morgan Fairchild in a small role as a gangster's moll. Buchanan later said "I gave her her first job" on the film.

According to one account, halfway through the film AIP executives were worried about the movie being behind schedule and replaced Buchanan with Maury Dexter.

According to Dexter's own memoirs, he went on the film as executive producer at the behest of James H. Nicholson of AIP "to make sure Larry brought the film in on schedule and with some amount of quality." Dexter says that "the film went along without a hitch and Larry delivered a nice film" but that after it was put together to a rough cut Dexter and AIP "thought it was too slow and talky." He then took a small crew and returned to Dallas with stunt doubles and the actors "and shot several scenes involving action. We cut the new material in and we thought it helped the film overall."

=== Songs ===
The group The Source sing the following songs:

- "Bullet for a Pretty Boy"
- "It's Me I'm Running From"
- "I'm Gonna Love You ('Til I Die)"
- "Gone Tomorrow"
- "Ruby Ruby"

As a solo artist in the 1980s, the lead vocalist of the Source, Richard Bowen, re-recorded another song from the Harley Hatcher sessions, "Phantom in the Rain," for another Larry Buchanan film, Down On Us, which served as an ersatz song by Jim Morrison and the Doors in that film.

== Reception ==
The New York Times accused Buchanan of making "a murderous gangster movie full of mostly nice guys" which "looks a little as if they had taken the members of the cast of, say, Beach Blanket Bingo and put them in costume and given them old cars to drive and told them to play it for real." The Los Angeles Times thought the film was "surprisingly free from gratuitous gore" but was still "another very pale carbon of Bonnie and Clyde" in which Fabian "handles himself in competent fashion amidst a host of amateurs."

Diabolique magazine later said:

Fabian gives another accomplished performance as a gee-it-isn’t-his-fault-kid-forced-to-crime. His physical attractiveness is exploited heavily in the movie – surprisingly few films did this considering Fabian became a pop star mostly by being good looking. Here he’s got Jocelyn Lane and Astrid Warner throwing themselves at him, as well as a brothel madam. The film itself is competent rather than inspired – it could have done with more passion – but isn’t bad.

== See also ==
- List of American films of 1970
