= Gravity (TV series) =

American comedy-drama television series

- Also known as: Suicide for Dummies; Failure to Fly
- Genre: Comedy drama
- Created by: Jill Franklyn; Eric Schaeffer
- Starring: Ivan Sergei; Krysten Ritter; Eric Schaeffer; Rachel Hunter; Robyn Cohen; James Martinez; Seth Numrich; Ving Rhames
- Narrated by: Brad Abelle
- Composer: Matthew Puckett
- Country of origin: United States
- Original language: English
- No. of seasons: 1
- No. of episodes: 10

Production
- Executive producers: Jill Franklyn; Eric Schaeffer; Dan Pasternack
- Producer: Daniel Hank
- Production locations: New York City, New York
- Editor: Lisa Bromwell
- Running time: 26-30 minutes
- Production company: Kill That B**ch Productions

Original release
- Network: Starz
- Release: April 23 – June 25, 2010

Gravity (stylized with brackets and two interpuncts as [grav·i·ty]) is an American comedy-drama television series created by Jill Franklyn and Eric Schaeffer. It ran for one season in 2010 on Starz.

== Premise ==
The series "follows the sometimes comic, sometimes tragic exploits of a group from an eccentric out-patient program of suicide survivors". Production of the show began in New York City in October 2009.

== Creation ==
Franklyn created the show during the 2007–2008 Writers Guild of America strike. She is known for her Emmy-nominated "Yada Yada" episode of Seinfeld. In 2008 she brought in Eric Schaeffer and they collaborated in selling the show to the Starz Network. The show's working titles were Suicide for Dummies and Failure to Fly.

== Cast ==
- Ivan Sergei as Robert Collingsworth; a middle aged eye doctor labeled the "suicide dummy" after driving off a peak in an attempt to kill himself so that he could be with his dead wife, he landed on a cruise ship. He has a relationship with Lily Champagne and develops a conflicted friendship with Christian; he also has an ugly relationship with his estranged mother.
- Krysten Ritter as Lily Champagne; a shy, lonely 27-year-old woman who works at a department store who attempts to kill herself by an overdose of codeine chased down with a slice of chocolate cake and claims to have had sex with someone in heaven but turns out to have made it up to hide her true reasons for killing herself. She also enjoys sketching and when someone asks her why she says "I sell makeup at a department store, I change lives" .
- Eric Schaeffer as Detective Christian Miller; a police detective with a debt crisis after placing so many losing bets, he seems to stalk Lily after her suicide attempt and tries to look for information about his dead mother. His many flaws seem to have him butt heads with a man named Diego.
- Rachel Hunter as Shawna Rollins; a model who attempts to kill herself by slitting her wrists and develops a relationship with Adam
- Robyn Cohen as Carla; a housewife who attempts to kill herself by shooting herself after being tired of a routine life and living up to everyone's expectations.
- James Martinez as Jorge Sanchez; a former construction worker who attempts to kill himself by placing himself in a collapsing building, he is so insecure about his penis size that he gets a penis implant. He also works as a comedian.
- Seth Numrich as Adam Rosenblum; a teenager who attempts to kill himself by overdosing after his rocky relationship with his family makes him depressed. He also develops a relationship with Shawna.
- Ving Rhames as Dogg McFee; the group leader and former New York Mets player who attempted suicide after hearing all the criticism of losing the NLCS after a car accident left him unable to walk. He also has a difficult relationship with his son who chose the wrong path due to his father neglecting him.

== Episodes ==
| No. | Title | Directed by | Written by | Original release date | US viewers (millions) |
|---|---|---|---|---|---|
| 1 | "Suicide Dummies" | Eric Schaeffer | Eric Schaeffer & Jill Franklyn | April 23, 2010 | 0.123 |
Robert is seen driving his car off a cliff and onto a gay cruise, an attempt to reunite with his late wife. Lily is seen picking things up at a grocery store, mixing pills into a chocolate cake, hoping to end up with her long lost boyfriend. The two of them end up as Accountability buddies in a Suicide Support Group, consisting of a former model, an aspiring comedian, a teen from a wealthy family, a straight laced house wife, and a family man, led by a former New York Mets turned paraplegic. Detective Miller tells Lily he's keeping an eye on her, for suicide is a crime. Robert confesses to his pastors about hooking up with Lily in an alleyway, much to the pastor's delight. During an evening event, the group meet up with the family man of the group. Two years after taking out a life insurance plan, he takes his own life.
| 2 | "Namaste MF" | Eric Schaeffer | Jill Franklyn & Eric Schaeffer | April 30, 2010 | N/A |
| 3 | "One Cold Swim Away" | Eric Schaeffer | Eric Schaeffer & Jill Franklyn | May 7, 2010 | 0.088 |
| 4 | "Old People Creep Me Out" | Eric Schaeffer | Jill Franklyn & Eric Schaeffer | May 14, 2010 | 0.146 |
| 5 | "Love At First Suicide" | Eric Schaeffer | Jill Franklyn & Eric Schaeffer | May 21, 2010 | 0.111 |
| 6 | "Dogg Day Afternoon" | Eric Schaeffer | Dan Pasternack | May 28, 2010 | 0.029 |
| 7 | "Let It Mellow" | Eric Schaeffer | Jill Franklyn & Eric Schaeffer | June 4, 2010 | 0.040 |
| 8 | "Damn Skippy" | Eric Schaeffer | Eric Schaeffer & Jill Franklyn | June 11, 2010 | N/A |
| 9 | "Calemnity" | Eric Schaeffer | Jill Franklyn & Eric Schaeffer | June 18, 2010 | 0.107 |
| 10 | "Are We All Just Dead?" | Eric Schaeffer | Eric Schaeffer & Jill Franklyn | June 25, 2010 | 0.054 |
