= Down on Us =

- Teaser poster
- Directed by: Larry Buchanan
- Written by: Larry Buchanan
- Produced by: Murray M. Kaplan; Larry Buchanan
- Starring: Gregory Allen Chatman; Riba Meryl; Bryan Wolf
- Cinematography: Nicholas Josef von Sternberg
- Edited by: Larry Randolph
- Music by: Jeffrey Dann; David Shorey
- Distributed by: Omni Leisure International
- Release date: 1984
- Running time: 117 minutes
- Country: United States
- Language: English

Down on Us is a low budget 1984 movie about a US government plot to assassinate 1960s rock stars Jim Morrison, Janis Joplin, and Jimi Hendrix, using an elite force of killers. It is sometimes known as Beyond the Doors.

The movie does not use any of the original songs of the artists portrayed due to high royalty fees. Instead, they used songs written and performed to sound like the originals: Those artists were: Janet Stover as "Janis Joplin," David Shorey as "Jimi Hendrix," and Richard Bowen, of the American International Records recording artist, The Source (A Bullet for Pretty Boy), as "Jim Morrison" fronting the Doors. The film's ersatz, signature "Doors" tune, "Phantom in the Rain," was a 1984 solo remake of an old the Source single (1970) performed by Bowen. The starring actors lip-synced to the songs by Stover, Shorey, and Bowen.

Author F. Paul Wilson used a similar premise in his 1987 short story "The Years the Music Died."

== Plot ==
The story of Jimi Hendrix, Jim Morrison, and Janis Joplin, and how their message for their generation made them targets of a US government plot.

== Cast ==
- Gregory Allen Chatman as Jimi Hendrix
- Riba Meryl as Janis Joplin
- Bryan Wolf as Jim Morrison

== Reception ==
Variety's review was largely critical of the "campy" reproductions of concerts and other events. The review read, in part, "Pic's only revelation is the claim that Morrison faked his own death in order to regain his privacy".

A review in Austin American-Statesman called it, "the Reefer Madness of conspiracy theory movies".

A review in The Daily News read, "...the whole project is so out of it, it seems like the work of a Martian whose understanding of the counterculture comes entirely from reading old issues of Life magazine".
