= Castle Bryant Johnsen =

Television computer artistry group

Castle Bryant Johnsen is a television computer artistry group, working specifically in the field of title sequences. The group, consisting of James Castle, Bruce Bryant and Carol Johnsen, has created opening titles for television series, including As the World Turns (1993–1999), ALF, Knots Landing (1989–1993), Growing Pains, Roseanne (1995–1997), Moonlighting, The X-Files, Cheers, JAG and Frasier.

The Castle Bryant Johnsen group has won multiple Emmy Awards for their title sequences.
