= Jill Franklyn =

American screenwriter

Jillian Franklyn is an American television and film writer. Her first novel, Madly She Waited, was published in Spring, 2020 and is available on Amazon.

Born in Hollywood, she began as an actress. She has written and sold over thirty television pilots and four feature films with My First Mister with Albert Brooks being produced and was the opening film at Sundance film festival. Gravity was her series on the STARZ network, starring Krysten Ritter. She has an Emmy nomination for her first writing job for "The Yada Yada" episode of Seinfeld. Her short story was published in the collection titled 1970 and will be released in November 2016.
