= Never Again (2001 film) =

2001 film by Eric Schaeffer

- Theatrical release poster
- Directed by: Eric Schaeffer
- Written by: Eric Schaeffer
- Produced by: Robert Kravitz; Terence Michael; Eric Schaeffer; Dawn Wolfram
- Starring: Jeffrey Tambor; Jill Clayburgh; Caroline Aaron; Bill Duke; Sandy Duncan; Michael McKean; Lily Rabe; Suzanne Shepherd
- Cinematography: Thomas Ostrowski
- Edited by: Mitchel Stanley
- Music by: Amanda Kravat
- Production companies: Five Minutes Before the Miracle; Michael/Finney Productions
- Distributed by: USA Films
- Release dates: March 11, 2001 (SXSW); July 12, 2002 (United States)
- Running time: 98 minutes
- Country: United States
- Language: English
- Budget: $500,000
- Box office: $307,631

Never Again is a 2001 American comedy film written and directed by Eric Schaeffer. The film stars Jeffrey Tambor, Jill Clayburgh, Caroline Aaron, Bill Duke, Sandy Duncan and Michael McKean. After being shown at the 2001 South by Southwest, the film was widely released by USA Films on July 12, 2002.

== Plot ==
Never Again takes a ribald yet compassionate look at two lovelorn fifty-something New Yorkers. Christopher (Jeffrey Tambor) is an exterminator-cum-jazz musician who, after years of one-night stands, begins to question his sexual orientation. Grace (Jill Clayburgh) is a divorcee looking to jump-start her life again. When a blind date for Grace goes bad, she ducks into a gay bar, where she meets Christopher. The circumstances are so wrong that the two are immediately drawn to each other.

Just one problem, Grace and Christopher fall in love. Christopher pulls away from the relationship and breaks Grace’s heart. Grace and Christopher go through the motions so that they can discover that they don’t want to be alone and live together happily ever after. In the end, Grace plays “the knight in shining armor” to Christopher’s “damsel in distress”. The film ends with a happy reunion.

== Cast ==
- Jeffrey Tambor as Christopher
- Jill Clayburgh as Grace
- Caroline Aaron as Elaine
- Bill Duke as Earl
- Sandy Duncan as Natasha
- Michael McKean as Alex, The Transvestite
- Dan'l Linehan as Leather Go-Go Boy
- Bill Weeden as Mr. Speedy
- Eric Axen as Male College Go-Go Boy
- David Bailey as Chad
- Trazana Beverley as Night Nurse
- Tom Cappadona as The Waiter
- Caitlin Clarke as Allison
- India Cooper as Nurse
- Peter Dinklage as Harry Appleton
- Jenny Kravat as Big Sister
- Kasia Ostlun as College Girl
- Douglas Ladnier as Craig
- Meredith Lauren as The Waitress / Body Double
- Rachel Jéan Marteen as Carrie
- Melissa Maxwell as Doctor
- Dolores McDougal as Mrs. Feinstein
- Abigail Morgan as Girl #1
- Ebon Moss-Bachrach as Andy
- Jimmy Noonan as The Muscular Waiter
- Peter Reardon as Runner
- Manuel E. Santiago as Doorman
- Charlie Schroeder as The Waiter
- Eric Scott as Arthur
- Suzanne Shepherd as Mother
- Edward Steele as Handicapped Man
- Victor Truro as Sex Shop Clerk
- Anne Leighton as Girl #2
- Lily Rabe as Tess

== Reception ==
Never Again received negative reviews from critics. On Rotten Tomatoes, the film has a rating of 31%, based on 61 reviews, with a rating of 4.4/10. The site's critical consensus reads, "The performances are excellent, but much of the story rings false."
