= Amanda de Cadenet =

British photographer and entertainer

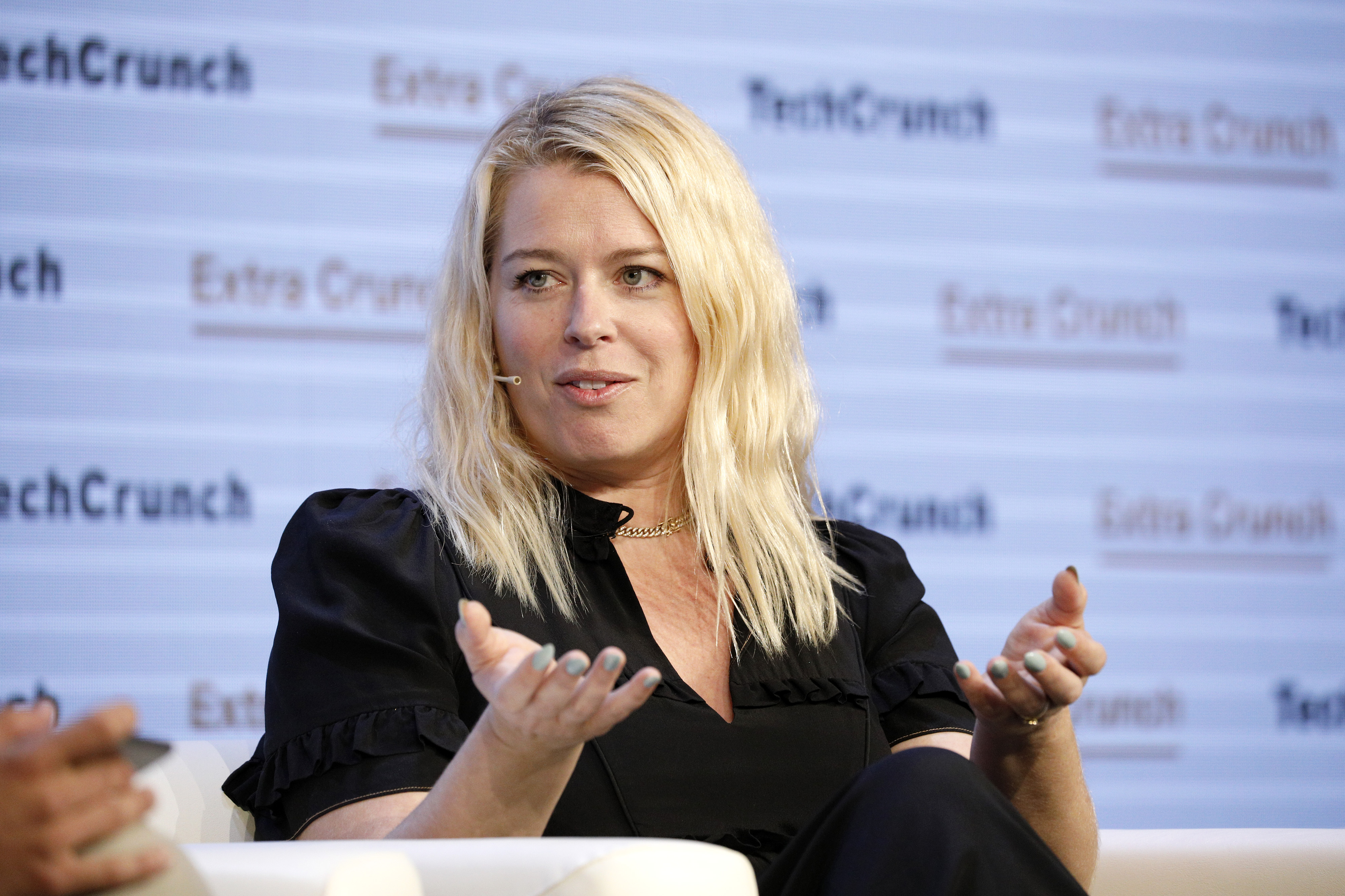
- de Cadenet in 2019
- Born: 19 May 1972 (age 54); Hampstead, London, England
- Occupations: Photographer; television presenter; author
- Years active: 1989–present
- Notable work: The Conversation with Amanda de Cadenet (2012–2016, 2019)
- Spouse(s): John Taylor (m. 1991–1997) Nick Valensi (m. 2006)
- Children: 3
- Family: Alain de Cadenet (father); Alexander de Cadenet (brother)

Amanda de Cadenet (/də ˈkædəneɪ/) (born 19 May 1972) is a British photographer, and media personality based in Los Angeles, United States. She began her entertainment career in the 1990s, first as a presenter for British series The Word and The Big Breakfast before moving to Los Angeles to briefly pursue an acting career. A tabloid figure at the time, she transitioned to a more private career as a photographer in the 2000s. She has hosted an eponymous interview series on the Lifetime Channel.

== Career ==
=== 1990–1999: Early career ===
At age 18, de Cadenet began her career as a co-presenter for The Word, a late-night Channel 4 entertainment show in 1990–1995. She also co-hosted the British television show The Big Breakfast.

Her career and reputation as a 'wild child' made her a British tabloid figure and she became only more well known when she married Duran Duran bassist John Taylor in 1991 at age 19. They moved from the United Kingdom to Los Angeles the following year. She embarked upon a short-lived movie career, appearing in Allison Anders's segment of the 1995 anthology film Four Rooms, Fall (1997) and Brokedown Palace (1999).

=== 2000–present: New ventures ===
Her career then turned to fashion and portrait photography, working for magazines such as Spin, Jane and Harper’s Bazaar, among others. In 2005, she published a photo book entitled Rare Birds. Her celebrity subjects have included Drew Barrymore, Sofia Coppola, Demi Moore, Olivia Wilde, Mary J. Blige, Keanu Reeves, Beck Hansen, and the members of The Strokes.

In the 2010s, she returned to television and worked on a series of eponymous interview projects. In 2011, it was announced that de Cadenet would be the host of a new television interview series called The Conversation with Amanda de Cadenet, airing on the Lifetime Channel, with Demi Moore as a co-executive producer. On the show, de Cadenet has interviewed female guests such as Hillary Clinton, Lady Gaga, Portia de Rossi, Rita Wilson, Gwyneth Paltrow, Zoe Saldaña and Jane Fonda. During the production of The Conversation, she developed a second show with Lifetime, a weekly late-night television talk show featuring de Cadenet entitled Undone with @AmandadeCadenet. The show ran for six episodes in 2014. In 2018, she worked with Showtime to develop a pilot for a half-hour weekly news-magazine show tentatively titled Now What With Amanda de Cadenet. The show did not air. In 2019, she developed a ten-episode spin-off podcast of The Conversation in partnership with Spotify.

In 2016, de Cadenet founded Girlgaze, a global online, multi-sided platform which connects women and non-binary creatives with different businesses, companies and brands. Speaking on her role as CEO and past experience as a photographer, she said “I'm interested in the stories [women and nonbinary] people have to tell, because of my own experience of being shut out of so many creative opportunities because of my gender.” For this work, Fast Company named her one of 2020's "Most Creative People in Business."

In 2017 she released her second book and collection of photography, #girlgaze: How Girls See the World. This was followed in 2018 by a book of essays published by Harper Wave titled It's Messy: On Boys, Boobs, and Badass Women.

== Personal life ==
De Cadenet was born in Hampstead, London, and is the daughter of Anna (née Gerrard), an interior designer and model. Her father was former racing car driver Alain de Cadenet. Her parents separated when she was 9 and her brother Alexander was 7. At 14, without permission, she left home to live with friends and sought modelling work, meeting a young Davina McCall who was working as a model booker. De Cadenet was subject to a Ward of court order and was returned to full time education, with an evening curfew at home. She became a television presenter for Channel 4, from 1990.

De Cadenet faced intense interest from the paparazzi while living in London, culminating in the publication of photographs of her breast feeding her daughter in a public park. She left England in 1992, moving permanently to the United States.

Her paternal English grandmother, Valerie Braham (an actress) was married to Maxime de Cadenet who was a lieutenant or a film technician in the French Air Force. According to The Times, he "claimed that his French ancestors had fought with Charlemagne in the 9th century".

De Cadenet was married to Duran Duran bassist John Taylor from 1991 until 1997. At the time of their marriage, according to de Cadenet herself, she was only 19, and pregnant and sober. She subsequently sought recovery from alcohol, following their daughter's birth and their relocation to America. Taylor and de Cadenet have one daughter, Atlanta de Cadenet Taylor.

In July 2006, she married guitarist Nick Valensi of American rock band the Strokes. Their twins were born in 2006.

== Filmography ==
=== Talk shows ===
- The Word (1990–1994); presenter
- The Big Breakfast (1994–1995); co-presenter
- The Conversation (2012, 2015–2016); host, executive producer
- Chelsea Lately (2012); guest host
- Project Runway (2014); guest judge
- The Talk (2014); guest co-host
- Undone with @AmandadeCadenet (2014); host, executive producer
- Now What With Amanda de Cadenet (unaired pilot, 2018); host, executive producer

=== Acting ===
- The Rachel Papers (1989)
- The Blue Flame (1993)
- Four Rooms (1995)
- Grace of My Heart (1996)
- Fall (1997)
- The Hunger (1997); TV series, 1 episode
- Implicated (1999)
- Mascara (1999)
- Brokedown Palace (1999)
- Arrested Development (2013); TV series, 1 episode

=== Podcasts ===
- The Conversation (2019–present); host

=== Other appearances ===
- Whatever Happened to the Wild Child? (2005); TV documentary
- Barely Famous (2015); reality TV series, 1 episode
- Embrace: The Documentary (2016)
- Elles (2018); TV documentary

== Bibliography ==
- "Programmes | Breakfast | Your photos: Amanda's choice". BBC News. 24 November 2005a.
- "The Strokes — Valensi And De Cadenet's Secret Wedding". Contactmusic News. Contactmusic.com. 18 July 2006.
- "Strokes guitarist in secret wedding". Irish Examiner. 19 July 2006. Archived from the original on 21 July 2011.
- "Naked Celebrities Talk Body Image". Harper's Bazaar. 16 April 2010. Archived from the original on 26 May 2010.
- Lee, Kristen May (24 May 2010). "Amanda De Cadenet: A Tfs Exclusive Interview". Thefashionspot.com. Archived from the original on 30 May 2010.
- Lusher, Tim (10 August 2010). "The Word: the presenters — What Terry Christian, Dani Behr, Amanda de Cadenet et al did next". The Guardian.
- Midler, Caryn; Lehner, Marla (24 October 2006). "Strokes Guitarist & Wife Welcome Twins". People. Archived from the original on 19 March 2008.
- Nolan, Larissa (3 September 2006). "Not all that peachy being a wild child". Irish Independent.
- "Twins for Strokes Guitarist & New Wife". People. 19 July 2007. Archived from the original on 6 February 2008.
- Reardanz, Karen (18 July 2006). "Daily Dish : Strokes' Guitarist's Secret Wedding". San Francisco Chronicle.
- "The Record". SPIN. 19 (12). December 2003. ISSN 0886-3032.
- "The Record". SPIN. 23 (1). January 2007. ISSN 0886-3032.
- Thompson, Peter A. (1997). Jack Nicholson: the life and times of an actor on the edge. Carol Pub. Group. ISBN 978-1-55972-420-3.
