= Alexander de Cadenet =

British artist

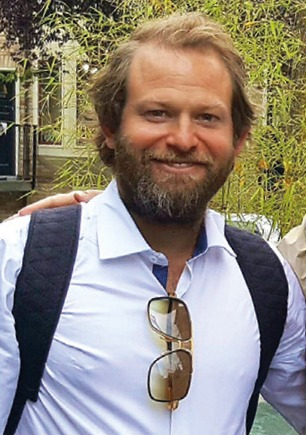
De Cadenet in 2016

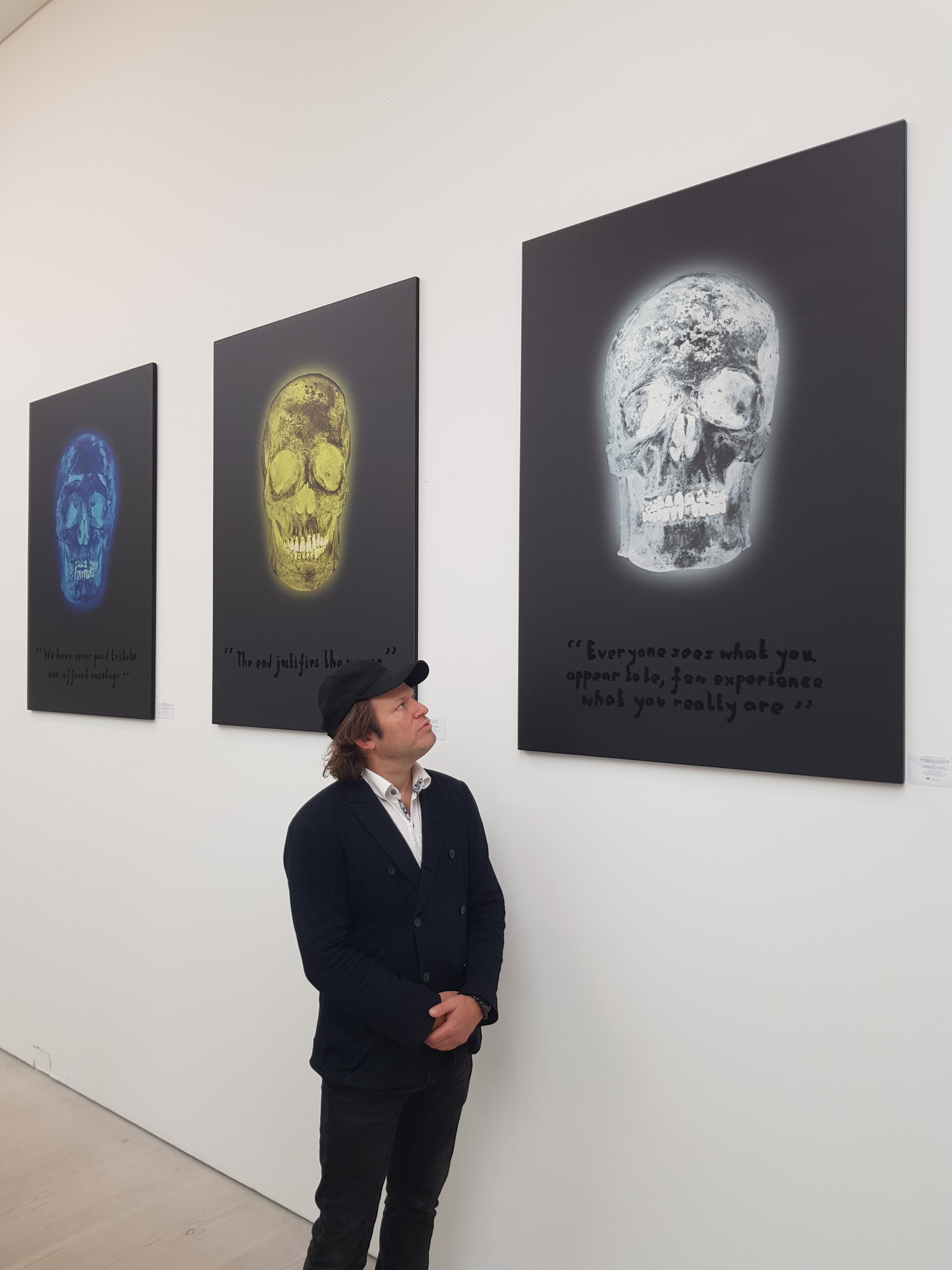
De Cadenet in 2022

Alexander de Cadenet (born 24 May 1974) is a British artist working in various media: predominantly painting, photography and sculpture. He is most known for his photographic "skull portraits" and also his meteorite and Life Burger sculptures. Set within the tradition of Vanitas, these works are designed as aids to spiritual and philosophical contemplation. He has referred to his art work as "a way to give experience meaning in a tangible form; it is an exploration into the mysteries and sacredness of life and its presentation through art".

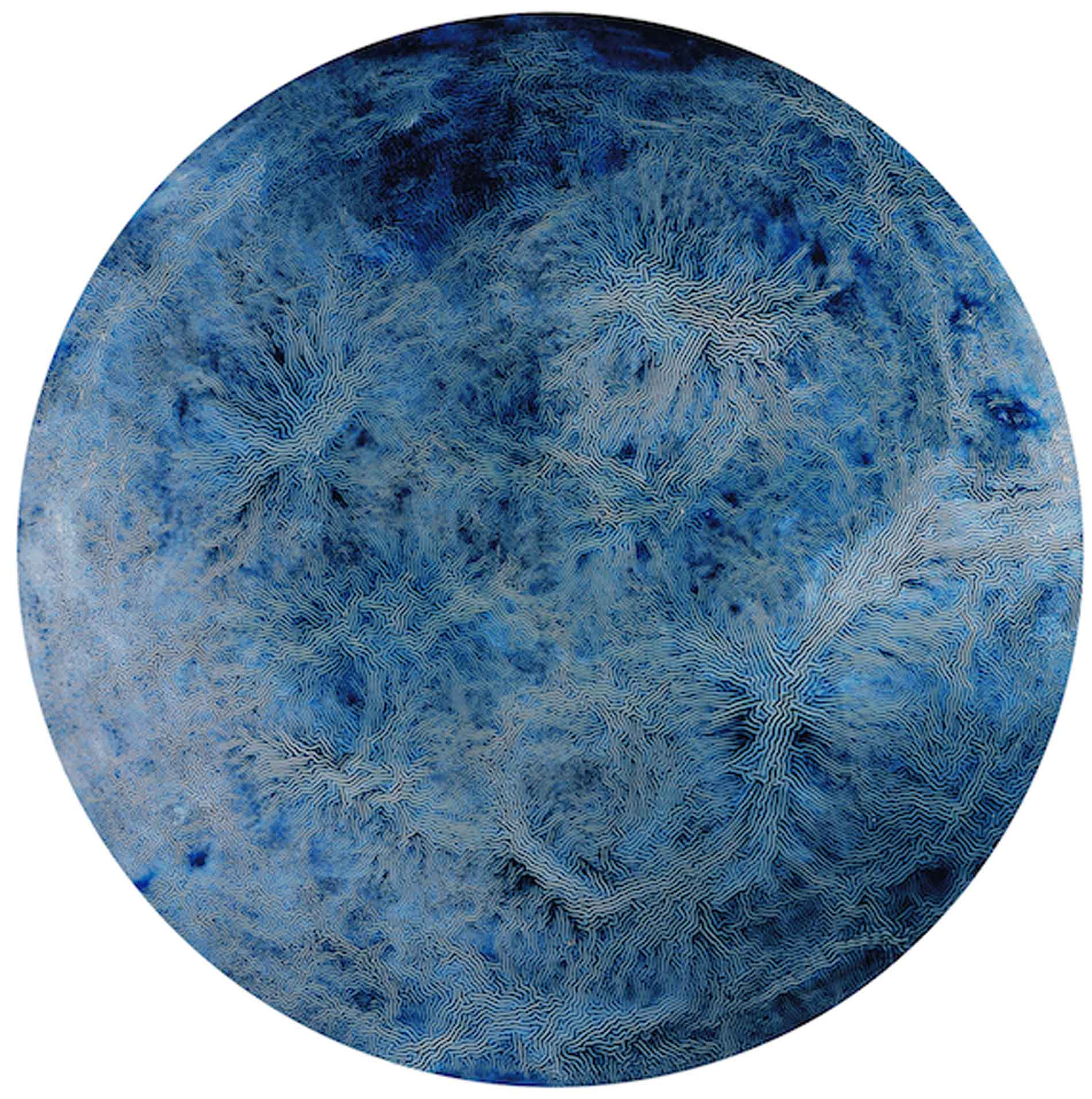
Turquoise Interconnections, 1998

== Life ==
De Cadenet was born and brought up in Chelsea, London. He was educated at Ashfold Prep School and Harrow School, where he won the Lincoln-Seligmann Art Prize in 1992. In 1995, he curated Liberty, a show of art by prisoners and special hospital patients, selected from the Koestler Awards Scheme, with the support of Chief Inspector of Prisons, Stephen Tumim.

== Career ==
=== Skull portraits ===
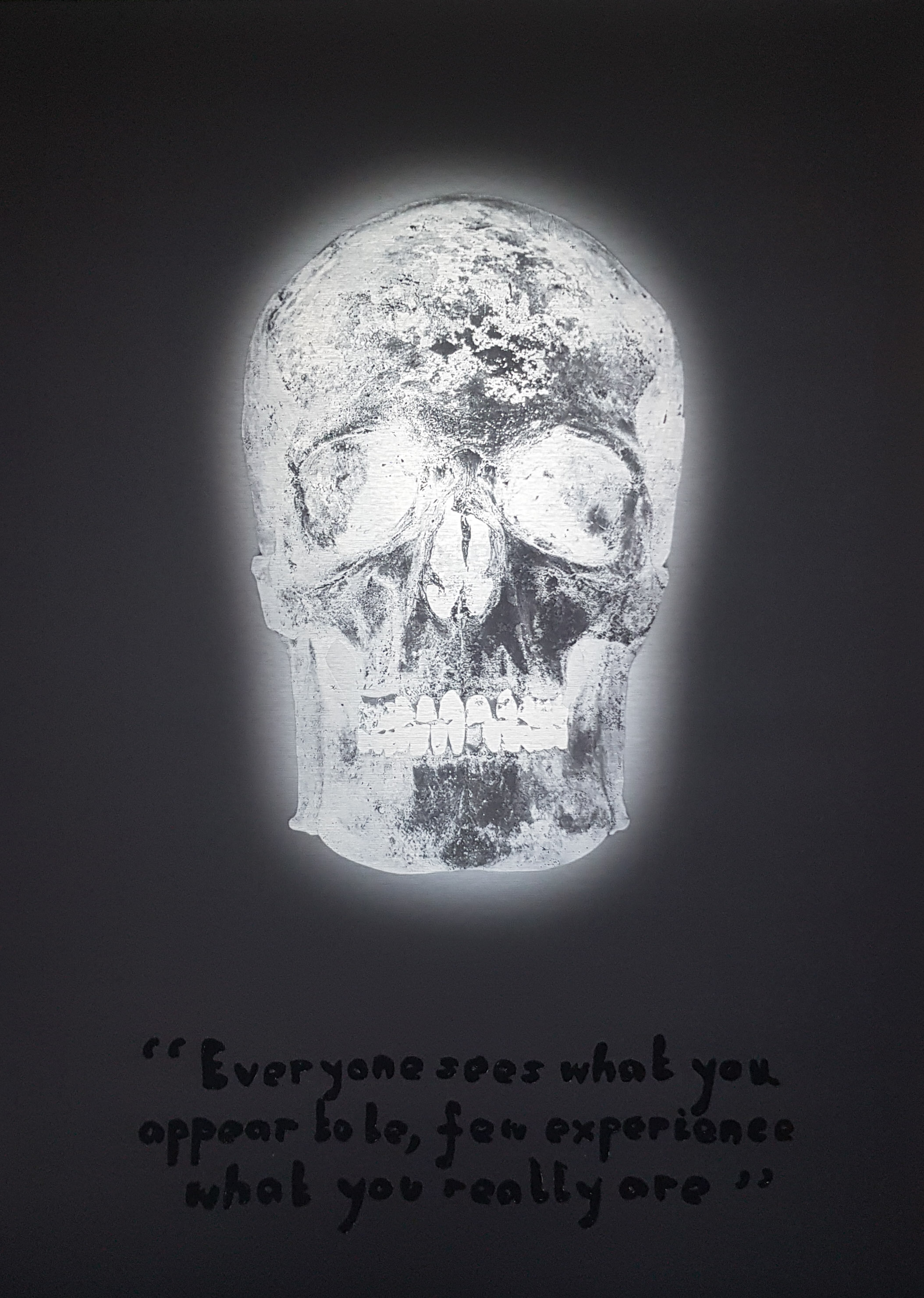
Everyone sees what you appear to be few experience what you really are (Lorenzo the Magnificent) bw version

De Cadenet launched his "skull portrait" concept at The Mark, a warehouse space gallery the artist opened at 259 Kings Road London in 1996. It featured an x-ray of his own skull hanging from the ceiling. Between 1996 and 2016, de Cadenet presented a successive series of photographic "skull portraits", based on X-rays of his subjects' skulls.

In 1998 he presented Skullduggery, featuring skull portraits of fashion models on the exterior of the Victoria & Albert Museum

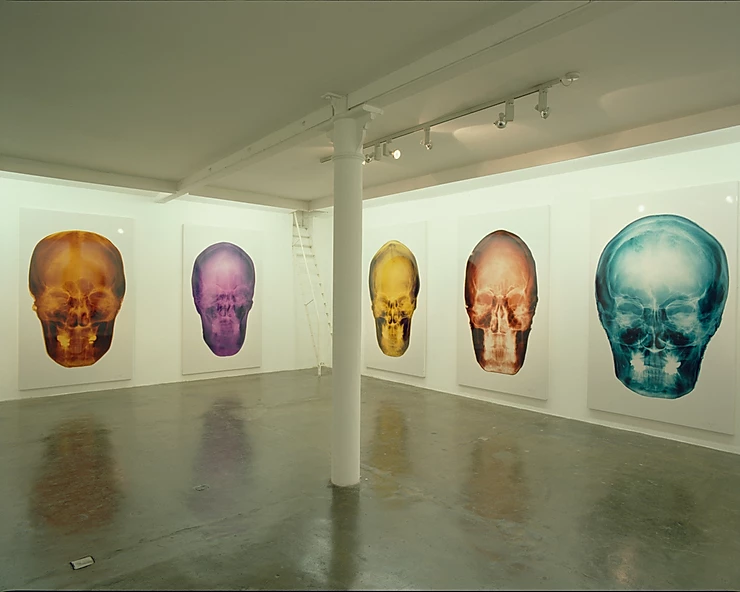
Installation view of Celebrity Skull Portraits at 30 Underwood Street Gallery, Shoreditch, London March 2000.

The ongoing series of works explores the themes of human achievement and the sacredness of art in particular within the tradition of Vanitas.The ten feet high Cibachrome photographic Celebrity Series was first presented in the UK in 2000 at 30 Underwood Street Gallery in Shoreditch, London.

He has been sourcing the skull x-rays of significant dead historical subjects to incorporate into his skull portraits. As of 2015, he had made portraits of Pharaoh Tutankhamun, Adolf Hitler, Albert Einstein and Marilyn Monroe. In 2016, he presented a skull portrait of Richard III in conjunction with Leicester University.

In October 2022, de Cadenet presented within the Saatchi Gallery London with West Contemporary a new series of skull portraits, based on photos taken in 1947 of the remains of the Medici Family within the Michelangelo designed tomb. This series was the first skull portraits series he had created for seven years and revealed various stylistic innovations, including the use of photos as opposed to x-ray photography, printing on aluminium, incorporating hand painted (and some with glitter) quotes from the subjects or from Machiavelli texts that reference their characters, and introducing different coloured auras for them. This series specifically explores the ability of art to question the nature of identity and to contribute to the ongoing legacy of the subjects after death.

=== Meteorite castings ===
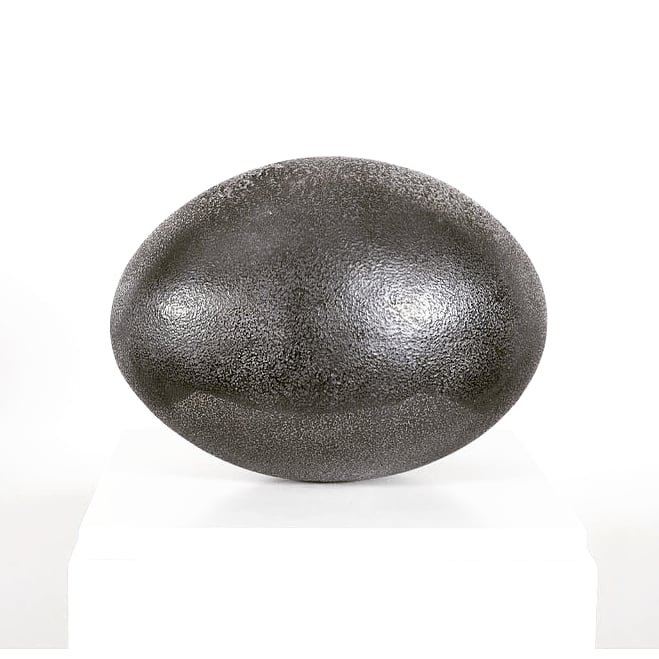
Meteorite Egg, 2017

A meteorite apple was sold at Philips Auctioneers in 2016, setting a record price for the artist's sculptures at auction.

=== Life Burgers ===
In 2016, the artist launched his Life Burger sculptures in California, continuing his preoccupation with human ambition, material success and mortality. The works received wide critical acclaim. In 2018, the Sunday Times reported the sale of the 7 inch high, solid silver Trump Burger for £30,000 to a UK collector.

=== Awakened Artists ===
Following his meeting with spiritual teacher Eckhart Tolle in 2016, he founded the Awakened Artists group, an international community whose work explores themes around evolving consciousness.

=== Editorial / Curatorial Projects / Poetry ===
He has had two books of poetry published, The Muse in 1999 and Afterbirth in 2015.

In 2016, Unicorn Publishing published Alexander de Cadenet a retrospective of the artists work by art-historian Edward Lucie-Smith.
