= Romantic ballet =

Type of dance

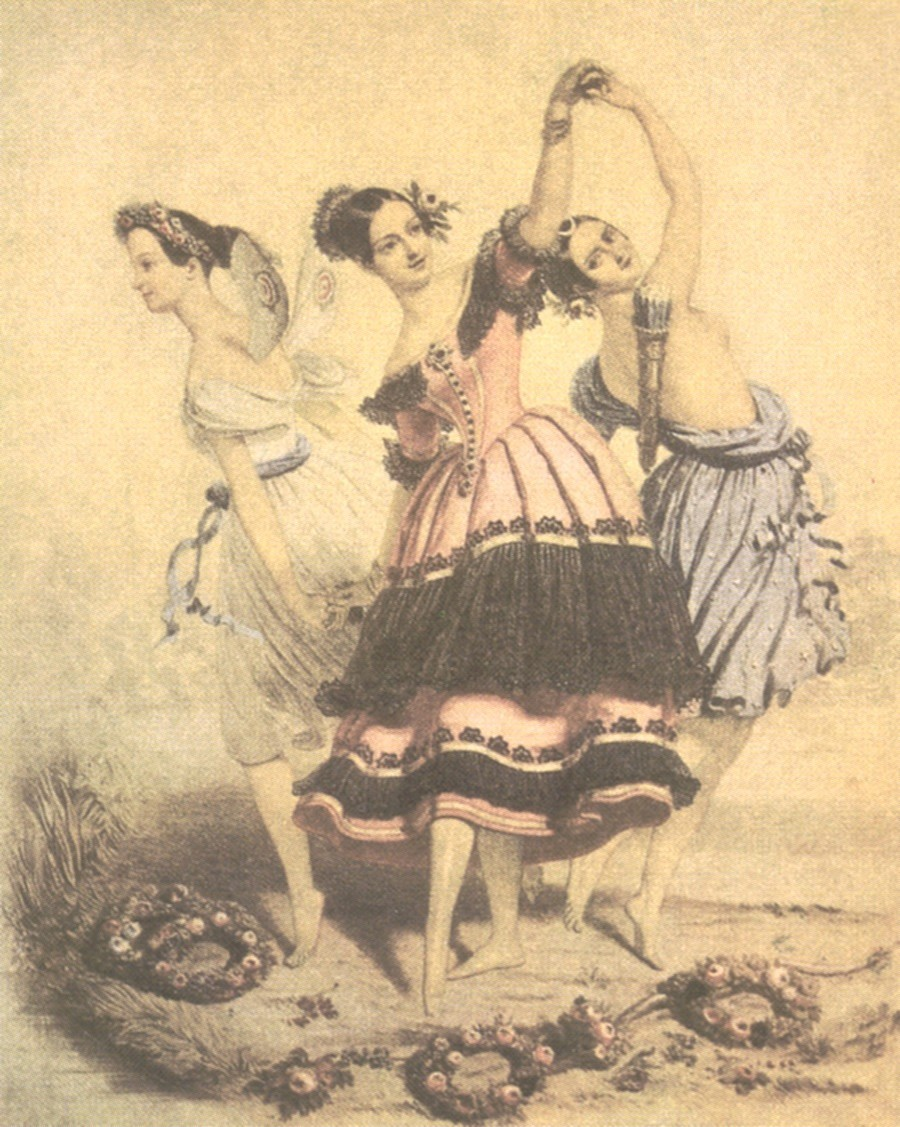
The Three Graces: embodiment of the Romantic ballet, ca. 1840. This lithograph by A. E. Chalon depicts three of the greatest ballerinas in three of the era's defining roles: (left to right) Marie Taglioni as the Sylph in Filippo Taglioni's 1832 ballet La Sylphide; Fanny Elssler as Florinda in the dance La Cachucha from Jean Coralli's 1836 ballet Le Diable boiteux; and Carlotta Grisi as Béatrix in the Grand pas de Diane chasseresse from Albert's 1842 ballet La Jolie Fille du Gand.

The Romantic ballet is defined primarily by an era in ballet in which the ideas of Romanticism in art and literature influenced the creation of ballets. The era occurred during the early to mid 19th century primarily at the Théâtre de l'Académie Royale de Musique of the Paris Opera Ballet and Her Majesty's Theatre in London. It is typically considered to have begun with the 1832 début in Paris of the ballerina Marie Taglioni in the ballet La Sylphide, and to have reached its zenith with the premiere of the divertissement Pas de Quatre staged by the Ballet Master Jules Perrot in London in 1845. The Romantic ballet had no immediate end, but rather a slow decline. Arthur Saint-Léon's 1870 ballet Coppélia is considered to be the last work of the Romantic Ballet. Romantic ballet is believed to have been experienced in three main phases: The zenith phase from 1830 to 1840, the decline phase from 1850 to 1880, and the revival phase in the 1890s prior to Diaghilev. Each phase is synonymous with the production of a few specifically stylized ballets.

During this era, the development of pointework, although still at a fairly basic stage, profoundly affected people's perception of the ballerina. Many lithographs of the period show her virtually floating, poised only on the tip of a toe. This idea of weightlessness was capitalised on in ballets such as La Sylphide and Giselle, and the famous leap apparently attempted by Carlotta Grisi in La Péri.

Other features which distinguished Romantic ballet were the separate identity of the scenarist or author from the choreographer, and the use of specially written music as opposed to a pastiche typical of the ballet of the late 18th and early 19th centuries. The invention of gas lighting enabled gradual changes and enhanced the mysteriousness of many ballets with its softer gleam. Illusion became more diverse with wires and trap doors being widely used. Additionally, technical advancements in production of tulle facilitated the popularization of romantic tutus, a costume that became synonymous with the era.

== Cult of the ballerina ==
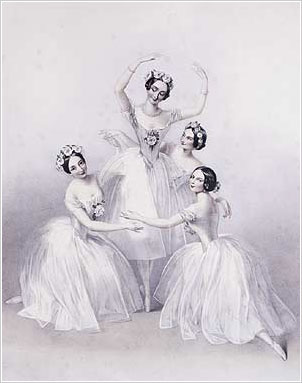
Lithograph by A. E. Chalon of Carlotta Grisi (left), Marie Taglioni (center), Lucille Grahn (right back), and Fanny Cerrito (right front) in the Perrot/Pugni Pas de Quatre, London, 1845. The premiere of the Pas de Quatre is considered to be the Romantic ballet at its zenith.

The Romantic era marked the rise of the ballerina as a central part of ballet, where previously men had dominated performances. There had always been admiration for superior dancers, but elevating ballerinas to the level of celebrity came into its own in the nineteenth century, especially as female performers became idealized and objectified. Marie Taglioni became the prototypical Romantic ballerina, praised highly for her lyricism. The movement style for Romantic ballerinas was characterized by soft, rounded arms and a forward tilt in the upper body. This gave the woman a flowery, willowy look. Leg movements became more elaborate due to the new tutu length and rising standards of technical proficiency. Important Romantic ballerinas included Marie Taglioni, Carlotta Grisi, Lucille Grahn, Fanny Cerrito, Pauline Leroux and Fanny Elssler. The plots of many ballets were dominated by spirit women—sylphs, wilis, and ghosts, who enslaved the hearts and senses of mortal men and made it impossible for them to live happily in the real world.

While ballerinas became increasingly virtuosic, male dancers became scarce, particularly in Paris (although they were still common in other European areas, such as Denmark). This led to the rise of the female travesty dancer - a female dancer who played male roles. While travesty dancing had existed prior to the romantic period it was generally used in tableau and walk-on (marcheuse) parts. Now it became a high-status occupation, and a number of prima ballerinas made their names by dancing en travestie. Fanny Elssler and her sister both played travesty parts. The most well known travesty dancer was Eugénie Fiocre, who was the first dancer to play Frantz in Coppélia, as well as a number of ballerina roles.

=== Femininity in the Romantic Era ===
The ballets of the Romantic era were largely written and choreographed by men, thus the role of women in these ballets is largely reflective of the Romantic view and status of women in general. Emphasis on the sensuality and innocence of women through the roles of supernatural and weightless characters revealed the desire of men to both protect and exploit the opposite sex. The role of the female enchanter was a staple of the romantic era and it greatly outnumbered the roles of male enchanters in ballets. The Romantic age was consumed with beauty and the mysterious dichotomy of the sexual and spiritual facets of femininity. Despite the growing importance of females in ballet, women benefitted little socially, as the era was still defined by widely accepted patriarchal notions. As a result of the idealized women presented on stage and the men in the plots willing to die for them, young dancers often found themselves to be exploited by men in society who wished to preserve the idea of femininity they were presented through romantic storylines.

== Design and scenography ==
=== Romantic tutu ===
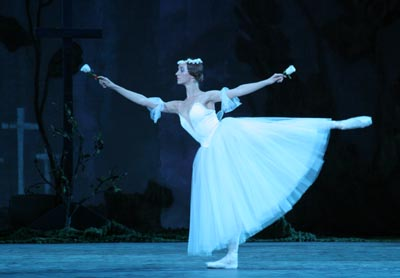
A romantic tutu

The costume for the Romantic ballerina was the romantic tutu. This was a full, white, multi-layered skirt made of tulle. The ballerina wore a white bodice with the tutu. In the second acts of Romantic ballets, representing the spiritual realm, the corps de ballet appeared on stage in Romantic tutus, giving rise to the term "white act" or ballet-blanc. The inclusion of gas lights and the romantic tutu in romantic ballets resulted in a sense of eeriness among theatergoers of the era due to the revelation of the dancer's silhouetted legs through the thin fabric. Prior to the 19th century tulle was hand woven, meaning the creation of each costume was time-consuming and costly. The invention of the bobbinet machine in 1808 streamlined the production of tulle, allowing for larger scale production of the romantic costumes that construct the era's signature look.

The end of the Romantic era saw a shift in the shape of tutu from the bell shaped full skirt of the romantic tutu to the short and stiff skirt that characterized the classical tutu. The shortening of the tutu came as a direct result of the increasing intricacy and difficulty of ballet steps. By the 1870s, the length of tutu had changed from mid-calf to above the dancer's knee. Tchaikovsky's Swan Lake in the late 1870s debuted an even shorter tutu, built with hoops and 10 layers of netting to maintain its flat, wide shape. The classical tutu soon became the most well known shape of skirt, used by prima ballerinas to show off their skill and strength.

=== Pointe shoes ===
The Romantic era marks the first time that dancers began to incorporate pointe work into their classwork and performances beyond the elementary poses and tricks meant to dazzle the eyes of an audience. Pointe shoes were initially implemented to give the effect of the dancer floating. The first use of pointe shoes in performance is attributed to Marie Taglioni in La Sylphide. Contrary to the hard shank and box of modern pointe shoes, Taglioni's pointe shoes were the typical ballet shoes of the era with extra darning around the side and tips of the shoes to create extra padding for her toes. Due to the lack of support in the shoes, ballerinas could not remain on pointe for long periods of time.

=== Technique ===
Ballet Technique from the Baroque era to the Romantic era is represented by a fluid shift in movement, with steps from the Baroque era being both lost and reimagined. The era saw pointe work become increasingly prevalent in class work, though the technique was not deemed to be particularly revolutionary. Records of classwork from the era refer to pointe work in a casual manner, indicating that pointe work was believed to be a natural extension of past ballet technique rather than a new phenomenon. With the introduction of pointe work into classes came an increased emphasis on strengthening of the feet for both male and female dancers. Exercises such as coupes were first taught during this era to prepare dancers for the strength needed to dance on unblocked pointe shoes. These exercises have since evolved alongside modern technique and taken on new meanings.

=== Special effects ===
Romantic ballet owed much to the new developments in theatre effects, particularly gas lighting. Candles had been previously used to light theatres, but gas lighting allowed for dimming effects and other subtleties. Combined with the effects of the Romantic tutu, ballerinas posing en pointe, and the use of wires to make dancers "fly," directors used gas lighting to create supernatural spectacles on stage.

== Famous ballets ==
- La Somnambule (1827)
- La Sylphide (1832)
- Le Diable boiteux (1836)
- La Fille du Danube (1836)
- La Gipsy (1839)
- Le Diable amoureux (1840)
- Giselle (1841)
- La Jolie Fille de Gand (1842)
- La Péri (1843)
- Ondine (1843)
- La Vivandière or Markitenka (1844)
- La Esmeralda (1844)
- Éoline, ou La Dryade (1845)
- Le Diable à Quatre (1845)
- Pas de Quatre (1845)
- Catarina, or La Fille du Bandit (1846)
- Le Jugement de Paris (1846)
- Paquita (1846)
- La Fille de marbre (1847)
- Electra, ou La Pléiade perdue (1849)
- Le Violon du diable (1849)
- La Filleule des fées (1849)
- Les Métamorphoses (1850)
- Vert-Vert (1851)
- Le Corsaire (1856)
- Le Papillon (1861)
- Coppélia (1870)

== Notable choreographers ==
- Albert
- Jean Coralli
- Joseph Mazilier
- Jules Perrot
- Marius Petipa
- Arthur Saint-Léon
- Filippo Taglioni
- Paul Taglioni

== Notable composers ==
- Adolphe Adam
- Cesare Pugni

== Notable theatres ==
- Her Majesty's Theatre, London
- Théâtre de l'Académie Royale de Musique of the Paris Opera Ballet
