= Le Diable à quatre (ballet) =

Ballet in two acts and three scenes (or in three acts)

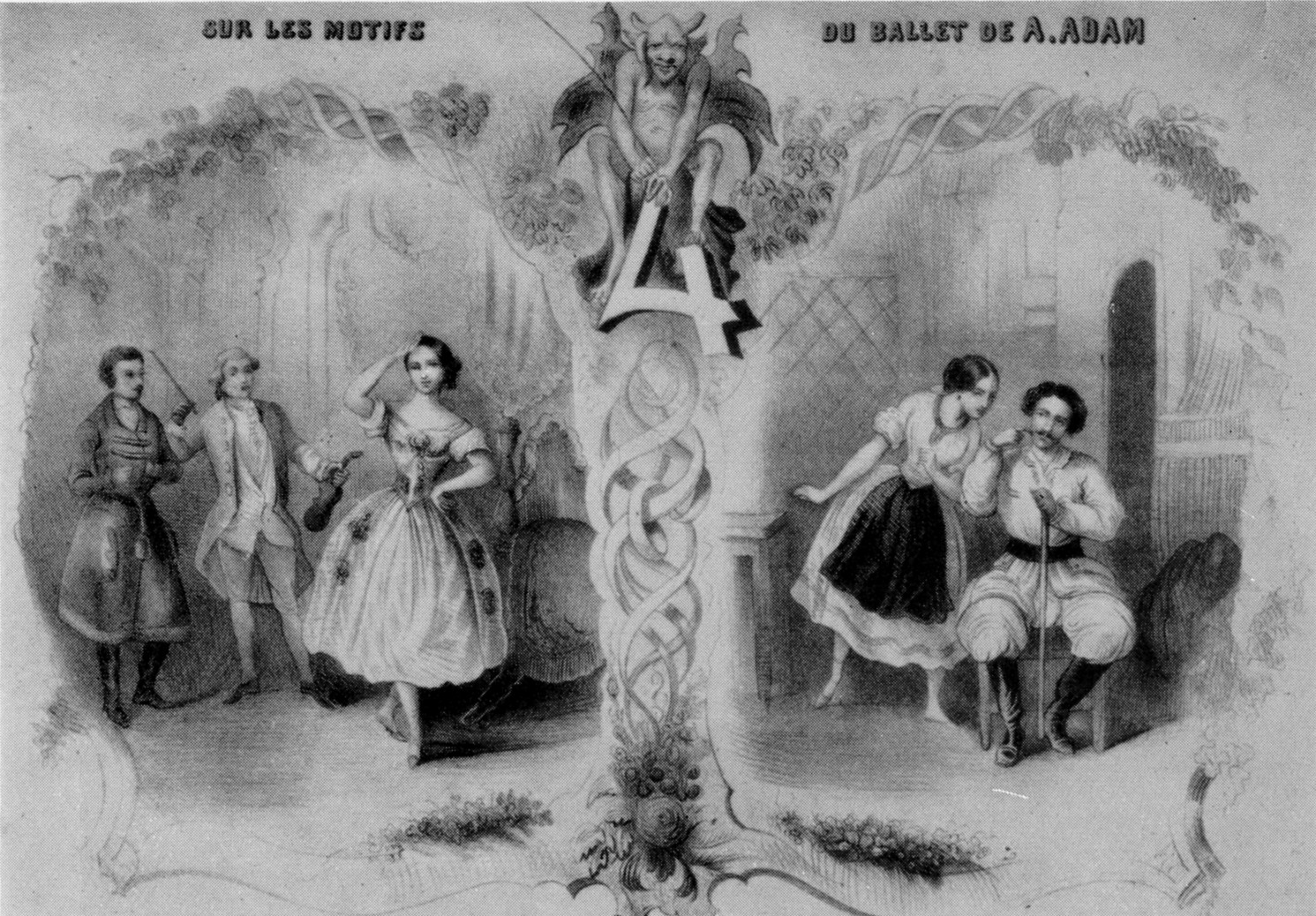
Frontispiece from a piano reduction of pieces taken from the Mazilier/Adam Le Diable à quatre, 1845. The frontispiece depicts, from left to right, Lucien Petipa, Jean Coralli, Carlotta Grisi, Maria Mazilier, and Joseph Mazilier.

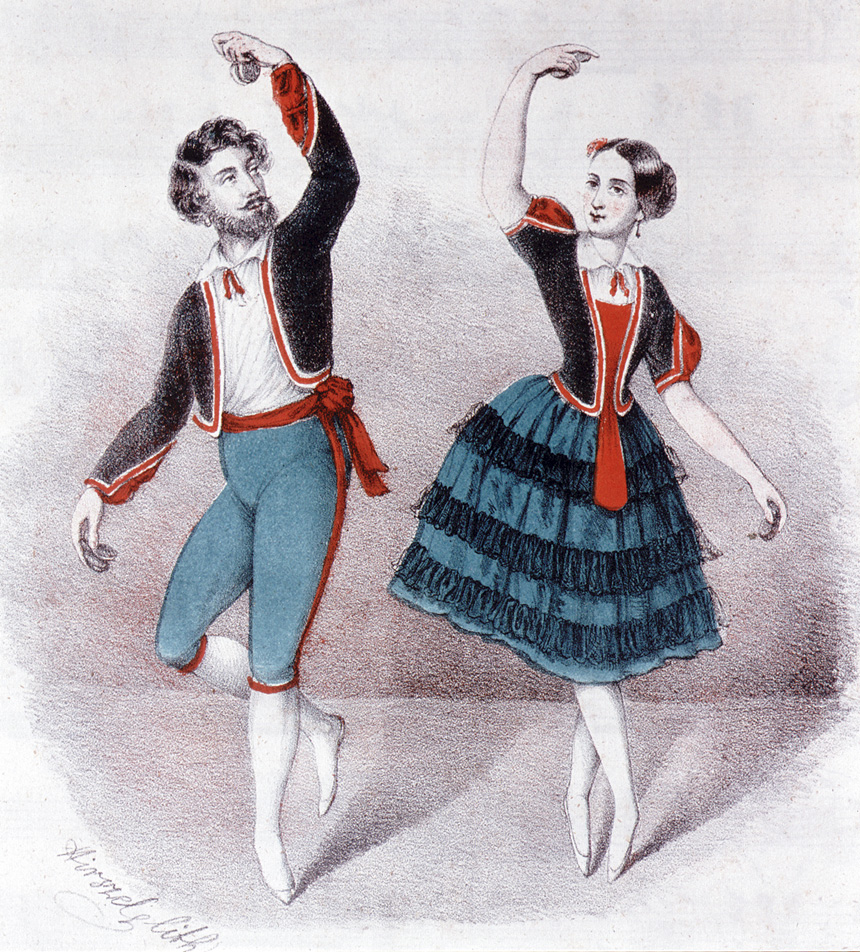
Aleksander Tarnowski as the Count and Konstancja Turczynowicz as the Peasant, 1847

Le Diable à quatre is a ballet in two acts and three scenes (or in three acts), with choreography by Joseph Mazilier, music by Adolphe Adam, and libretto by Adolphe de Leuven, first presented by the Ballet of the Académie Royale de Musique on 11 August 1845, with Carlotta Grisi (as Mazourka) and Lucien Petipa (as Count Polinski).

== Revivals ==
- Restaging by the ballerina Ekaterina Sankovskaya for the Ballet of the Moscow Imperial Bolshoi Theatre, first presented 15/27 December 1846 (Julian/Gregorian calendar dates) in Moscow, Russia.
- Restaging by the Polish ballet master Roman Turczynowicz entitled Hrabina i wieśniaczka (The Countess and the Peasant) with Józef Stefani revising Adam's score for the Ballet of the Grand Theatre in Warsaw. First presented 28 October 1847. Principal dancers: Konstancja Turczynowicz (as Ninetta, the Peasant), Felix Kschessinsky (as Maturyn, the Basket Maker), Teodora Gwozdecka (as Amelia, the Countess) and Aleksander Tarnowski (as Count de St. Leon).
- Restaging by Jules Perrot for the Imperial Ballet in 4 Acts/5 Scenes, with Cesare Pugni extensively revising and adapting Adam's score. First presented on 14/26 November 1850 at the Imperial Bolshoi Kamenny Theatre in St. Petersburg, Russia.
- Revival by Marius Petipa for the Imperial Ballet under the title La femme capricieuse, with Ludwig Minkus revising Adam's score in Pugni's 1850 revision. First presented on 23 January/4 February 1885 at the Imperial Bolshoi Kamenny Theatre in St. Petersburg, Russia. For this revival Petipa changed the name of the principal ballerina's role from Mazourka to Countess Berta. Principal dancers: Eugeniya Sokolova (as Mazourka), Mariia Gorshenkova (as the Basket Maker wife), and Pavel Gerdt (as Count Polinski).

Variations from Adam's score for Le Diable à quatre were used for the male variation from the famous Paquita pas de trois (Minkus pas de trois) and the male variation from Flower Festival in Genzano pas de deux.

3-act revival with choreography by Ronald Hynd designed by Peter Docherty musical arrangement of Adam's score by John Lanchbery. Premiere for PACT Ballet South Africa June 26, 1984. Revival for Santiago Ballet Chile October 8, 1989. Both won Best Ballet Award 1984–89.

== Gallery ==
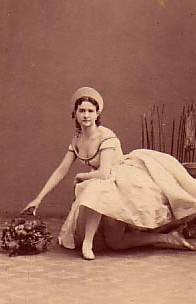
Marie Surovshchikova-Petipa as Mazourka, St. Petersburg, 1861

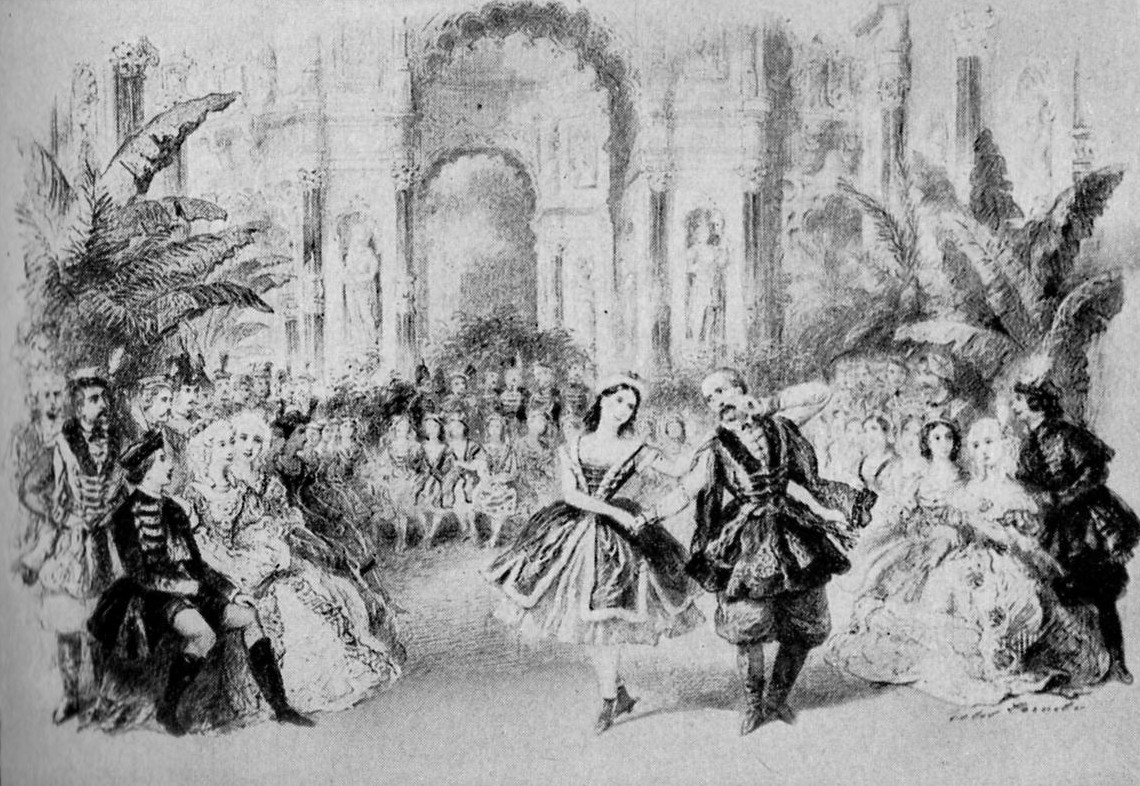
Act II-Scene 3, with Carlotta Grisi and Lucien Petipa, Paris, 1845

== Recording ==
- Richard Bonynge conducted the London Symphony Orchestra in a recording of an 1850 edition of Adolphe Adam's score for Le Diable à quatre as staged in Berlin. The recording was released on the label Decca on both CD and LP.
