= Pas de Quatre (Perrot) =

1845 ballet choreographed by Jules Perrot

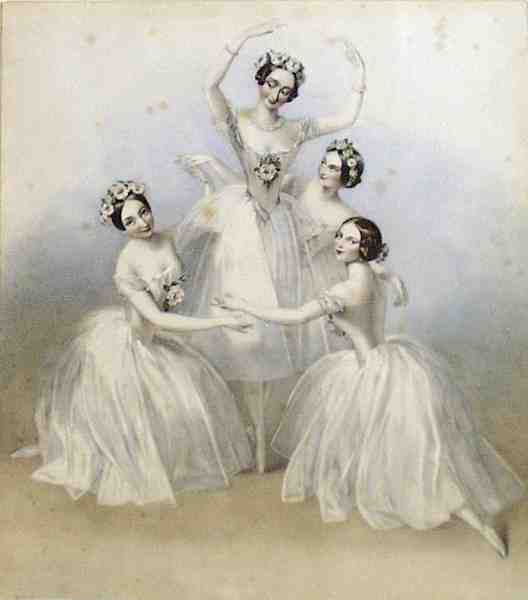
- Lithograph by A. E. Chalon: Carlotta Grisi (left), Marie Taglioni (center), Lucille Grahn (right back), and Fanny Cerrito (right front); in the Perrot / Pugni Pas de Quatre, London, 1845
- Choreographer: Jules Perrot
- Music: Cesare Pugni
- Premiere: 12 July 1845; Her Majesty's Theatre, London, U.K.
- Created for: Lucile Grahn, Carlotta Grisi, Fanny Cerrito, and Marie Taglioni
- Genre: Romantic ballet
- Type: Ballet divertissement

Grand Pas de Quatre is a ballet divertissement choreographed by Jules Perrot in 1845, on the suggestion of Benjamin Lumley, Director at Her Majesty's Theatre, to music composed by Cesare Pugni.

On the night it premiered in London (12 July 1845), it caused a sensation with the critics and the public alike. The reason for this was that it brought together, on one stage, the four greatest ballerinas of the time – in order of appearance, Lucile Grahn, Carlotta Grisi, Fanny Cerrito, and Marie Taglioni. (The fifth great Romantic ballerina of the time, Fanny Elssler, had been invited to take part but declined to do so; she was replaced by the young Lucile Grahn who accepted without hesitation.)

Pas de Quatre captured the essence of the Romantic style as the ballerinas danced with demure lightness, delicacy, and poise. The steps demand that each area of classical ballet technique is executed. These areas include adagio movements, petite allegro, grand allegro, fast footwork, graceful changes of position, and the elegant and fluid arm movements that have become a signature element of Pas de Quatre. Each ballerina has an individual variation, which are performed in succession between an opening and finale that are danced by all the ballerinas together. These variations were choreographed for the ballerina premiering in each role, and were designed to display the best features of each.

== History ==
The order of appearance of the ballerinas was done by age, from youngest to oldest, to squelch further confrontations between them. The original cast of Pas de Quatre only danced four performances together; Queen Victoria and Prince Albert were in attendance on 17 July 1845, at the third of these four performances.

== Dolin's version ==
Nearly one hundred years later, in 1941, a new version of Pas de quatre was staged by choreographer Anton Dolin. The dancers he used were, in order of appearance: Nathalie Krassovska as Lucile Grahn, Mia Slavenska as Carlotta Grisi, Alexandra Danilova as Fanny Cerrito, and Alicia Markova as Marie Taglioni. Since then many ballet companies have performed the piece, including the Irish Ballet Company, for which Dolin remounted the work in Cork in January 1975.

The sole and exclusive rights to perform Dolin's Pas de Quatre were left to Festival Ballet (now English National Ballet) dancers Belinda Wright and Jelko Yuresha, husband and wife. Wright and Dolin had known each other since Wright was a young dancer. She had won a Pavlova Award and caught Dolin's attention. Wright was a principal with Dolin's Festival Ballet after years with the Royal Ballet, and her husband Yuresha was a soloist. When Dolin died, his estate, run by his nephew Phillip, bestowed the rights to Pas de Quatre to Wright and Yuresha. Dolin's Pas de Quatre may not be staged, performed, produced or recorded without their permission and their doing the staging.

== The music ==
The original music was composed by Cesare Pugni but only used for the four performances in July 1845 at Her Majesty's Theatre with the great ballerinas Grahn, Grisi, Cerrito and Taglioni. No further performance took place in the next decades.

The publisher Julien issued Pugni's piano version immediately following the successful premiere. Pugni's autograph orchestral score is preserved in the archives of the Bibliothèque Nationale de France. Nevertheless, the new choreography of Anton Dolin made use of an orchestral arrangement prepared by composer Leighton Lucas from the original piano score. Since then several other composers created orchestral versions from the piano score of Cesare Pugni, like William McDermott, Daniel Stirn or Peter March.
