= Lucile Grahn =

Danish ballerina (1819–1907)

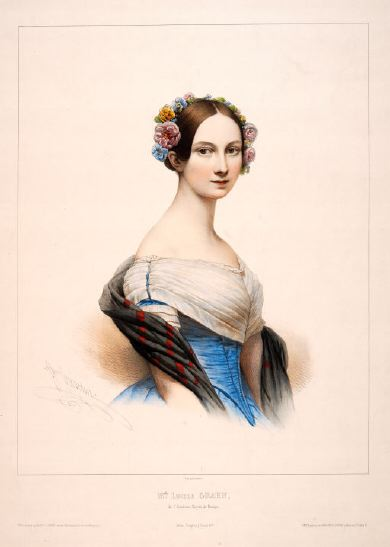
- Born: Lucile Alexia Grahn-Young; June 30, 1819; Copenhagen, Denmark
- Died: April 4, 1907 (aged 87); Munich, Germany

Lithograph by J. Branard of Lucile Grahn in the title role of the Perrot/Pugni Catarina. Here Grahn is costumed for the celebrated Pas stragétique. London, 1846

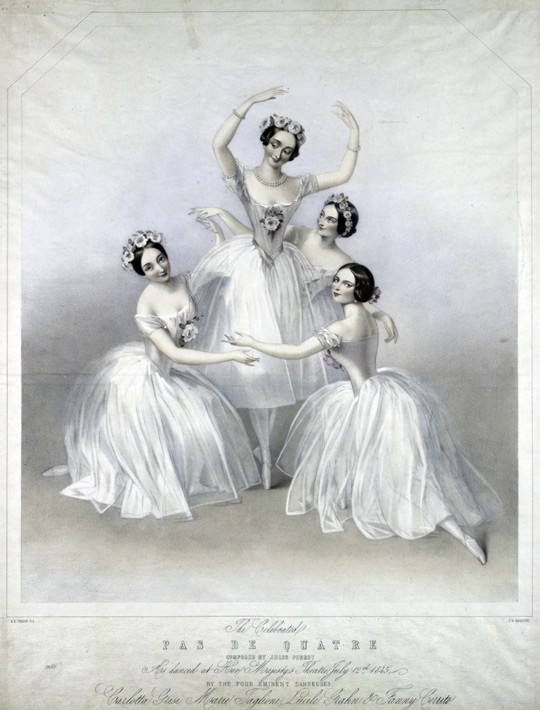
Lithograph of Danish ballerina Lucille Grahn (second from right) by Thomas Herbert Maguire. Dominating the image is Marie Taglioni, standing with her arms en couronne, with Grahn, Fanny Cerrito, and Carlotta Grisi paying homage around her.

Lucile Alexia Grahn-Young (30 June 1819 – 4 April 1907) was the first internationally renowned Danish ballerina and one of the popular dancers of the Romantic ballet era.

Grahn studied from a young age at the Royal Danish Theatre School in Copenhagen, Denmark under the tutelage of August Bournonville. She officially debuted in 1834 at the theater and took on the leading role of Astrid in Bournonville's Valdemar in 1835. Soon the relationship between Bournonville and Grahn began to sour as she yearned to dance with the famed Paris Opera Ballet. Grahn reportedly changed some of the steps in Valdemar to show off her footwork, prompting Bournonville to make a formal complaint to the theatre directors. In 1836, she created the title role in Bournonville's La Sylphide. She eventually received royal permission to leave; after her departure in 1836, she never returned to Denmark.

In 1839, Grahn had overstayed the terms of her formal leave, and was dropped from the Royal Danish Ballet's rolls. She had been appearing with the Paris 'Opera' Ballet; from 1839 to 1845, extending her audience base, Grahn danced in several cities, including London, St. Petersburg, and Milan. In 1845, her place among the accepted soloists of her day was acknowledged when she was invited to dance Perrot's Pas de Quatre alongside the already famous dancers Fanny Cerrito, Carlotta Grisi, and Marie Taglioni. As the least well-known of the four, Grahn agreed to dance first.

After 1846, Grahn toured much of Europe, not only dancing, but also producing several ballets, including a revival of Perrot's Catarina, and even her own play Bacchus et Ariadne. Grahn moved to Hamburg, Germany in 1848 and became so fond of the country that she built a home in Munich.

Grahn retired from dancing in 1856 and was married to Friedrich Young. She became ballet mistress from 1858 to 1861 in Leipzig, Germany and from 1869 to 1875 at the Court Opera in Munich. She died in Munich in 1907, and left her generous estate to the city.

== See also ==
- Women in dance
