= Turczynowicz =

Turczynowicz is a Polish surname of East-Slavic origins. It is a patronymic surname derived from the nickname "Turczyn" literally meaning "turk" with the help of the Slavic patronymic suffix "-owicz/-ovich". The Russian-language variant is Turchinovich, Belarusian: Turchynovich. Ukrainian: Turchynovych, Lithuanian: Turčinavičius. Notable people with the surname include:

- Danuta Turczynowicz (1921–1943), Polish World War II independence fighter
- Konstancja Turczynowicz (1818–1880), Polish ballet dancer
- Laura de Turczynowicz (1878–1953), Canadian operatic singer

== See also ==
- Turčinović, South Slavic variant
