= The Slave (ballet) =

1868 ballet by Marius Petipa

The Slave (also known as L'Esclave) is a ballet divertissement in one act, choreographed by the Balletmaster Marius Petipa to the music of Cesare Pugni, first presented by the Imperial Ballet for the Imperial Court at the Hermitage Theatre, on April 27/May 9 (Julian/Gregorian calendar dates), 1868 in St. Petersburg, Russia. It featured Lev Ivanov.
