= Lydia, the Swiss Milkmaid =

1821 Demi-Caractère ballet by Filippo Taglioni and Adalbert Gyrowetz

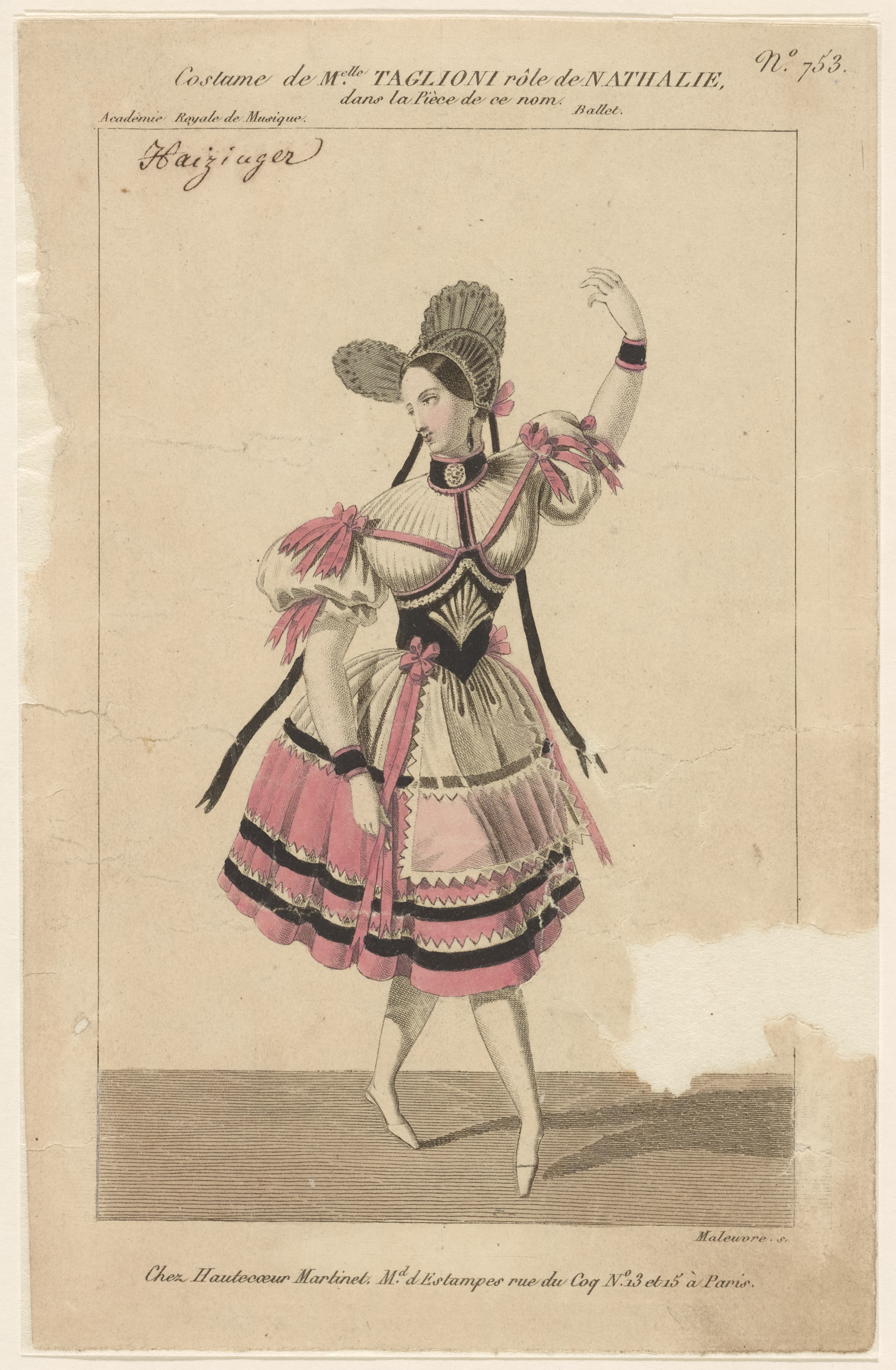
Costume for Marie Taglioni in the role of Nathalie

Lydia, the Swiss Milkmaid (a.k.a. Lydia, ou la Laitière Suisse, or as Natalie, oder Das schweizer Milchmädche) is a Demi-Caractère ballet in 2 acts, with choreography by Filippo Taglioni and music by Adalbert Gyrowetz.

First presented as Das schweizer Milchmädche at the Theater am Kärntnertor, Vienna, Austrian Empire on Monday, October 8, 1821.

== Revivals ==
- Revival by Filippo Taglioni for the Ballet du Théâtre de l'Académie Royale de Musique under the title Nathalie, ou la Laitière suisse, with Michele Carafa revising Gyrowetz's score. First presented in Paris, France, on November 7, 1832. Principal dancers: Marie Taglioni.
- Revival by Jules Perrot, Marius Petipa and Jean Petipa in 2 acts-2 scenes for the Imperial Ballet under the title Lydia, ou la Laitière Suisse with Cesare Pugni revising Carafa's 1832 version of Gyrowetz's score. First presented at the Imperial Bolshoi Kamenny Theatre in St. Petersburg, Russia on 20 December [O.S. 8 December] 1849. Principal Dancers: Fanny Elssler

== Notes ==
- The Balletmaster Antoine Titus created a ballet with the same title for the Théâtre de la Porte Saint-Martin, in Paris in 1823. In 1832 Titus restaged his 1823 production of for the Court Opera Ballet in Berlin, Prussia with Fanny Elssler in the lead role, and in 1833 staged the work for the Imperial Ballet in St. Petersburg where it was not well received.
- Marius Petipa claimed sole authorship of the 1849 revival in St. Petersburg in his memoirs, in which he refers to the work as "a new ballet of my own.". This was disputed throughout the 19th century—a published review by A. Wolf of the Imperial Ballet's 1849–1850 season credits the work as "Jules Perrot's new production", while in the ballet historian Alexander Pleshcheyev's study of the ballet of Tsarist St. Petersburg, titled Our Ballet, the work is attributed to Petipa's father Jean Petipa, with only Perrot having contributed one of the ballet's dances. In the biography Jules Perrot: Master of the Romantic Ballet by the ballet historian Ivor Guest, the ballet's choreography is credited to Jean Petipa, except for the Scène dansante and a Pas de trois which are credited to Perrot.
