= Vivandière (disambiguation) =

Vivandière or La Vivandière may refer to:

- Vivandière a generic name for women attached to military regiments
- La Vivandière (Gilbert), a burlesque by W. S. Gilbert,
- La Vivandière (Godard), an opera by Benjamin Godard
- La Vivandière or Markitenka, a ballet by Arthur Saint-Léon, Fanny Cerrito, and Cesare Pugni
