= Cesare Pugni =

Italian composer (1802–1870)

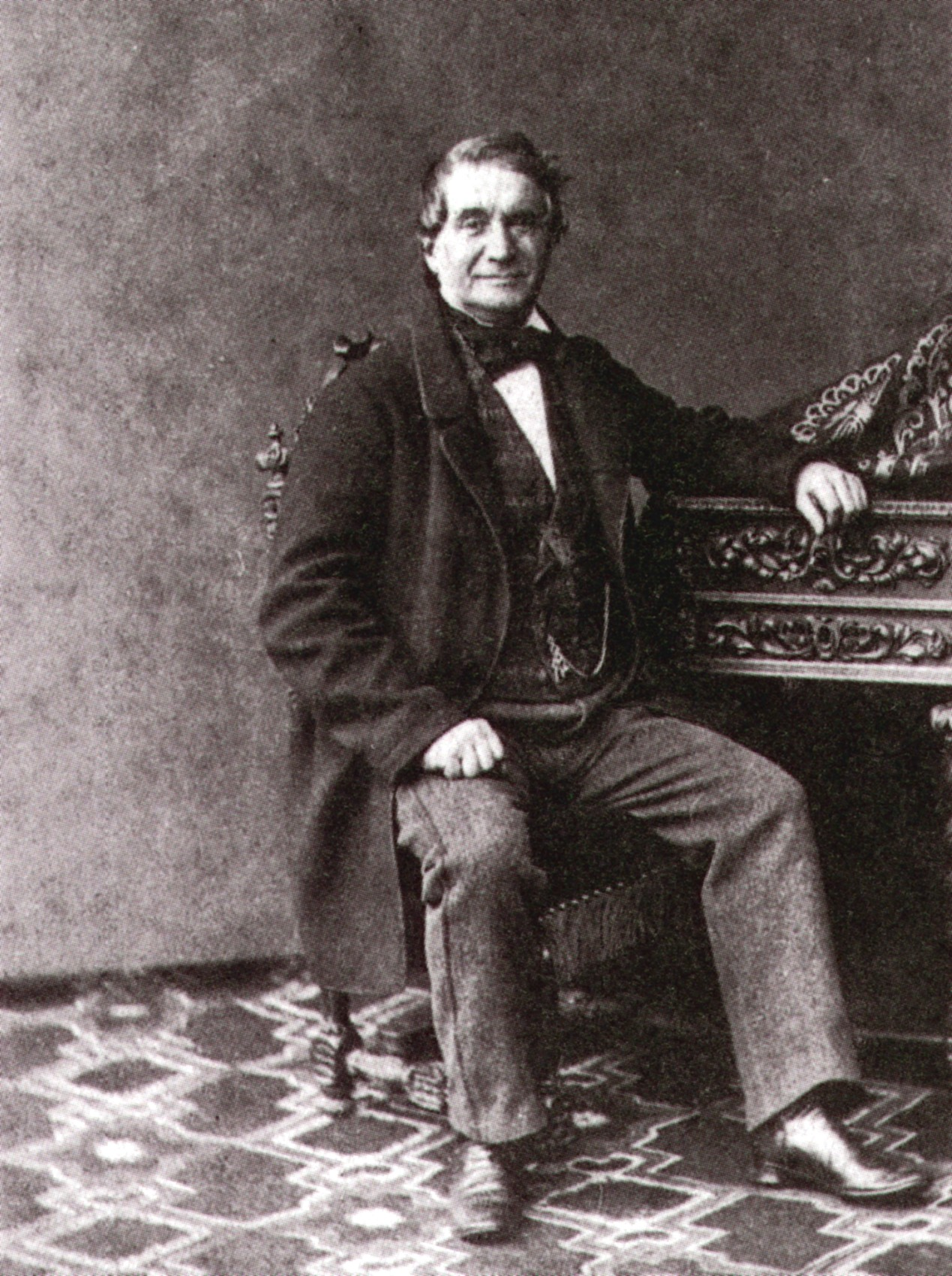
Maestro Cesare Pugni, St. Petersburg, c. 1865

Cesare Pugni (Italian pronunciation: [ˈtʃeːzare ˈpuɲɲi, ˈtʃɛː-]; Russian: Цезарь Пуни, romanized: Cezar' Puni; 31 May 1802, in Genoa – 26 January [O.S. 14 January] 1870) was an Italian composer of ballet music, a pianist and a violinist. He studied composition with Bonifazio Asioli and violin with Alessandro Rolla. In his early career he composed operas, symphonies, and various other forms of orchestral music. Pugni is most noted for the ballets he composed for Her Majesty's Theatre in London (1843–1850), and for the Imperial Theatres in St. Petersburg, Russia (1850–1870). The majority of his ballet music was composed for the works of the ballet master Jules Perrot, who mounted nearly every one of his ballets to scores by Pugni. In 1850 Perrot departed London for Russia, having accepted the position of Premier maître de ballet of the St. Petersburg Imperial Theatres at the behest of Carlotta Grisi, who was engaged as Prima ballerina. Cesare Pugni followed Perrot and Grisi to Russia, and remained in the imperial capital even after Grisi's departure in 1853 and Perrot's departure in 1858. Pugni went on to compose for Perrot's successors Arthur Saint-Léon and Marius Petipa, serving as the Imperial Theatre's official composer of ballet music until his death in 1870.

Cesare Pugni was renowned for the speed with which wrote, often composing the music for a multi-act Grand ballet in just a few days. Pugni was perhaps the most prolific composers of ballet music, having composed over 100 known original scores for the ballet and adapting or supplementing many other works. He composed myriad incidental dances such as divertissements and variations, many of which were added to countless other works.

Of Pugni's original scores for the ballet, he is best known today for Ondine, ou La Naïade, (also known as La Naïade et le pêcheur) (1843); La Esmeralda (1844); Catarina, ou La Fille du Bandit (1846); The Pharaoh's Daughter (1862); and The Little Humpbacked Horse (1864). Of his incidental dances, etc., he is most noted for the Pas de Six from La Vivandière (also known as Markitenka) (1844); the Pas de Quatre (1845); La Carnival de Venise pas de deux (1859); the Diane and Actéon Pas de Deux (1868); and his additional music for the ballet Le Corsaire (1863 and 1868).

In his private life, Cesare Pugni was considered a kind and ebullient man, with a passion for gambling and wine. From his two marriages, Pugni was the father of some 15 children, many of whom had large families of their own. Today there are hundreds of Russians descended from the Italian composer. Among his grandchildren was the artist Ivan Puni, and the dancer and pedagogue Alexander Shiryaev, who also created the earliest known stop motion films and was the first to film ballet dancers

== Ballets ==
=== La Scala, Milan ===
- Il Castello di Kenilworth. Choreography by Gaetano Gioja. 26 April 1825.
- Elerz e Zulmida. Choreography by Louis Henri. 6 May 1826.
- L'Assedio di Calais. Choreography by L. Henri. 15 February 1827.
- Pelia e Mileto. Choreography by Salvatore Taglioni. 28 May 1827.
- Don Eutichio della Castagna, ossia La Casa disabitata. Choreography by S. Taglioni. 16 August 1827.
- Agamennone. Choreography by Giovanni Galzerani. 1 September 1828.
- Adelaide di Francia. Choreography by L. Henri. 26 December 1829.
- Macbeth. Choreography by L. Henri. 20 February 1830.
- William Tell. Choreography by L. Henri. 20 February 1833.
- Monsieur de Chalumeaux. Choreography by G. Galzerani. 14 January 1834.

=== Her Majesty's Theatre, London ===
- L'Aurore. Choreography by Jules Perrot. 11 March 1843.
- Les Houris. Choreography by J. Perrot. 27 April 1843.
- Ondine, ou la Naïade. Choreography by J. Perrot and Fanny Cerrito (for the Pas de six). 22 June 1843.
- Hamlet. Choreography by J. Perrot. 1843 – never premiered.
- Le Délire d'un peintre. Choreography by J. Perrot. 3 August 1843.
- La Esmeralda. Choreography by J. Perrot. 9 March 1844.
- Myrtelde, ou La Nymphe et le papillon. Choreography by J. Perrot. 1844 – never premiered.
- La Polka (incidental dance). Choreography by J. Perrot. 11 April 1844.
- La Vivandière. Choreography by Arthur Saint-Léon. 23 May 1844.
- Zélia, or La Nymphe de Diane. Choreography by J. Perrot. 25 June 1844.
- La Paysanne Grande Dame. Choreography by J. Perrot. 25 July 1844.
- Jeanne d'Arc. Choreography by J. Perrot. 1844 – never premiered.
- Éoline, ou La Dryade. Choreography by J. Perrot. 8 March 1845.
- Kaya, ou L'amour voyageur. Choreography by J. Perrot. 17 April 1845.
- La Bacchante. Choreography by J. Perrot. 1 May 1845.
- Rosida, ou Les Mines de Syracuse. Choreography by A. Saint-Léon and F. Cerrito. 29 May 1845.
- Pas de Quatre (divertissement). Choreography by J. Perrot. 12 July 1845.
- Diane. Choreography by J. Perrot. 24 July 1845.
- Catarina, or La Fille du Bandit. Choreography by J. Perrot. 3 March 1846.
- Lalla Rookh. Choreography by J. Perrot. 11 June 1846. The music for the second and third tableaux contained passages based on Félicien David's 1844 symphonic ode Le désert.
- Le Jugement de Paris. Choreography by Perrot. 23 July 1846.
- Coralia, ou Le Chevalier inconstant. Choreography by Paul Taglioni. 16 February 1847.
- Méphistophéla. Choreography by P. Taglioni. 1847 – never premiered.
- Théa, ou Le Fée aux fleurs. Choreography by P. Taglioni. 18 March 1847.
- Orinthia, ou Le Camp des Amazones. Choreography by P. Taglioni. 15 April 1847.
- Les Eléments. Choreography by J. Perrot. 26 June 1847. Music composed jointly with Giovanni Bajetti.
- Fiorita et la Reine des elfrides. Choreography by P. Taglioni. 19 February 1848.
- Les Quatre saisons. Choreography by J. Perrot. 13 June 1848.
- Electra, ou La Pléiade perdue. Choreography by P. Taglioni. 17 April 1849.
- La Prima Ballerina, ou L'embuscade. Choreography by P. Taglioni. 14 June 1849.
- Les Plaisirs de l'hiver, ou Les Patineurs. Choreography by P. Taglioni. 5 July 1848.
- Les Métamorphoses (also known as Satanella). Choreography by P. Taglioni. 12 March 1850.
- Les Graces. Choreography by P. Taglioni. 2 May 1850.
- Les Délices du sérail. Choreography by Louis-François Gosselin. 15 July 1850.

=== The Paris Opéra ===
- La Fille de marbre (Paris production of Perrot's Alma). Choreography by A. Saint-Léon. Music by Michael Costa, adapted by Pugni. 20 October 1847.
- La Vivandière (revival). Choreography by A. Saint-Léon, with Pugni adapting his original score. 20 October 1848.
- Le Violon du diable (new version of Saint-Léon's Tartini il Violinista, originally staged for the Teatro La Fenice in Venice on 29 February 1848 with music Giovanni Felis with Saint-Léon composing the violin solos). Choreography by A. Saint-Léon, with Pugni adapting Felis and Saint-Léon's score. 19 January 1849.
- Stella, ou Les Contrebandiers. Choreography by A. Saint-Léon. 22 February 1850.
- Le Marché des Innocents (Paris production of Le Marché des parisien). Choreography by Marius Petipa and Lucien Petipa. 29 May 1861.
- Diavolina (Paris production of Graziela, ou Les Dépits amoureux). Choreography by A. Saint-Léon. 6 July 1863. Pugni utilized a suite of traditional Neapolitan airs called Passatempi Musicali for this score, as well as the Chasse aux Hirondelles by composer Maximilien Graziani.

=== Works for other theatres ===
- Le Fucine di Norvegia (5 acts). Choreography by Giacomo Piglia. Teatro Ducale, Parma. 26 December 1826.
- La Dernière heure d'un condamné. Choreography by L. Henry. Théâtre Nautique, Paris. Circa 1834–1835.
- La Ricompensa dell'amore spontaneo. Choreography by G. Galzerani. Theatre unknown, Paris. C. 1830–1835.
- Liacone. Choreography by L. Henry. Teatro di San Carlo, Naples. 4 September 1836.
- Don Zeffiro. Choreography by A. Saint-Léon. Théâtre Italien, Paris. 26 April 1865.
- Gli Elementi. Choreography by A. Saint-Léon. Théâtre Italien, Paris. 19 February 1866.

=== Imperial Bolshoi Kamenny Theatre, St. Petersburg ===
- La Guerre des femmes, ou Les Amazons du neuvième siecle. Choreography by J. Perrot. 23 November [O.S. 11 November] 1852.
- Gazelda, ou Les Tziganes. Choreography by J. Perrot. 24 February [O.S. 12 February] 1853.
- Marcobomba (also known as El Marcobomba). Choreography by J. Perrot, M. Petipa and J. Petipa. 5 December [O.S. 23 November] 1854.
- Armida. Choreography by J. Perrot. 20 November [O.S. 8 November] 1855.
- La Débutante. Choreography by J. Perrot. 29 January [O.S. 17 January] 1857. Pugni arranged this score from airs taken from his 1850 adaptation of Adolphe Adam's score for Perrot's La Filleule des fées (staged in St. Petersburg as L'Elève des fées in 1850), and his 1852 adaptation of Edouard Deldevez and Jean-Baptiste Tolbecque's score for Mazilier's Vert-Vert.
- La Petite marchande de bouquets. Choreography by J. Perrot and M. Petipa. 19 February [O.S. 7 February] 1857.
- L'Ile des muets. Choreography by J. Perrot. Music by Pugni and Théodore Labarre. 19 February [O.S. 7 February] 1857.
- Un Mariage sous la Régence. Choreography by M. Petipa. 30 December [O.S. 18 December] 1858.
- Le Marché des parisien (also known as Le Marché des innocents). Choreography by M. Petipa. 5 May [O.S. 23 April] 1859.
- Le Dahlia bleu. Choreography by M. Petipa. 12 May [O.S. 30 April] 1860.
- Graziela, ou Les Dépits amoureux (also known as Graziella, ou la Querelle amoureuse). Choreography by A. Saint-Léon. 23 December [O.S. 11 December] 1860. Pugni utilized a suite of traditional Neapolitan airs called Passatempi Musicali for this score, as well as the Chasse aux Hirondelles, all originally written by the composer Maximilien Graziani.
- Les Nymphes et le satyre. Choreography by A. Saint-Léon. 15 September [O.S. 3 September] 1861.
- The Pharaoh's Daughter. Choreography by M. Petipa. 30 January [O.S. 18 January] 1862.
- La Belle du Liban, ou L'Esprit des montagnes. Choreography by M. Petipa. 24 December [O.S. 12 December] 1863.
- The Little Humpbacked Horse (also known as La Tsar-Demoiselle). Choreography by A. Saint-Léon. 15 December [O.S. 3 December] 1864.
- Florida. Choreography by M. Petipa. 1 February [O.S. 20 January] 1866.
- Le Roi Candaule (also known as Tsar Kandavl in Russian). Choreography by M. Petipa. 29 October [O.S. 17 October] 1868.
- Les Deux étoiles (also known as Les étoiles or Les Deux petites étoiles). Choreography by M. Petipa. 11 February [O.S. 30 January] 1869.

=== Other venues in Russia ===
- L'Étoile de Grenade. Choreography by M. Petipa. Palace of the Grand Duchess Elena Pavlovna. 21 January [O.S. 9 January] 1855.
- Terpsichore. Choreography by M. Petipa. Imperial Theatre of Tsarskoye Selo. 27 November [O.S. 15 November] 1861.
- Titania. Choreography by M. Petipa. Palace of the Grand Duchess Elena Pavlovna. 30 November [O.S. 18 November] 1866.
- L'Amour bienfaiteur. Choreography by M. Petipa. Theatre of the Imperial Ballet School. 18 March [O.S. 6 March] 1868.
- L'Esclave. Choreography by M. Petipa. Imperial Theatre of the Hermitage. 9 May [O.S. 27 April] 1868.

=== Expanded editions of his own work for the Imperial Bolshoi Kamenny Theatre, St. Petersburg ===
- Le rêve du peintre (St. Petersburg production of Le Délire d'un peintre). Choreography by J. Perrot. 19 October [O.S. 7 October] 1848.
- La Esmeralda. Choreography by J. Perrot, Marius Petipa and F. Elssler. 2 January 1849 [O.S. 21 December 1848].
- La Naïade et le pêcheur (St. Petersburg production of Ondine, ou La naïade). Choreography by J. Perrot. 11 February [O.S. 30 January] 1851.
- Le Jugement de Paris. Choreography by J. Perrot. 18 February [O.S. 6 February] 1851.
- Markitenka (St. Petersburg production of La Vivandière). Choreography by J. Perrot after A. Saint-Léon. 25 December [O.S. 13 December] 1855.
- Éoline, ou la Dryade. Choreography by J. Perrot. 16 November [O.S. 4 November] 1858.
- La Danseuse en voyage (St. Petersburg production of La Prima Ballerina, ou L'embuscade). Choreography by Marius Petipa. 16 November [O.S. 4 November] 1864.

=== Adaptations of scores by other composers for the Imperial Bolshoi Kamenny Theatre, St. Petersburg ===
- Léda, ou la Laitière Suisse. Choreography by J. Perrot, M. Petipa and Jean Petipa after Filippo Taglioni. Music by Adalbert Gyrowetz and Michele Carafa. 20 December [O.S. 8 December] 1849.
- L'Élève des fées (revival of La Filleule des fées). Choreography by J. Perrot. Music by Adolphe Adam and Clémence, Comte de Saint-Julien. 24 February [O.S. 12 February] 1850.
- La Femme capricieuse (St. Petersburg production of Le Diable à Quatre). Choreography by J. Perrot after J. Mazilier. Music by Adolphe Adam. 26 November [O.S. 14 November] 1850.
- La Belle flamande (St. Petersburg production of La Jolie Fille du Gand). Choreography by J. Mazilier after Albert Decombe. Music by Adolphe Adam. 5 November [O.S. 24 October] 1851.
- Vert-Vert. Choreography by Joseph Mazilier. Music by Edouard Deldevez and Jean-Baptiste Tolbecque. 20 January [O.S. 8 January] 1852.
- Faust. Choreography by J. Perrot. Music by Giacomo Panizza. 14 February [O.S. 2 February] 1854.
- La Fille de marbre (St. Petersburg production of Alma). Choreography by J. Perrot. Music by M. Costa, adapted by Pugni. 19 February [O.S. 7 February] 1856.
- Le Corsaire. Choreography by J. Perrot and M. Petipa after J. Mazilier. Music by Adolphe Adam. 24 January [O.S. 12 January] 1858.
- Robert et Bertrand, ou Les Deux voleurs. Choreography by Felix Kschessinsky after François Hoguet. Music by Herman Schmidt. 11 May [O.S. 29 April] 1858.
- Jovita, ou Les Boucaniers mexicains. Choreography by A. Saint-Léon after J. Mazilier. Music by Théodore Labarre. 27 September [O.S. 15 September] 1859.
- Saltarello, ou La Dansomanie. Choreography by A. Saint-Léon. Music by Arthur Saint-Léon. 20 October [O.S. 8 October] 1859.
- La Somnambule, ou L'Arrivée d'un nouveau seigneur. Choreography by M. Petipa after Jean-Pierre Aumer. Music by Ferdinand Hérold. 21 December [O.S. 9 December] 1859.
- Pâquerette. Choreography by A. Saint-Léon. Music by François Benoist. 28 January [O.S. 16 January] 1860.
- La Perle de Séville. Choreography by A. Saint-Léon. Music by Santos Pinto. 5 February [O.S. 24 January] 1861.
- Météora, ou Les Étoiles de Grandville. Choreography by A. Saint-Léon. Music by Santos Pinto. 7 March [O.S. 23 February] 1861.
- Satanella (revival of Les Métamorphoses). Choreography by P. Taglioni. Music revised by Peter-Ludwig Hertel, adapted by Pugni. Court Opera Ballet, Berlin. 28 April 1852.
- Zoloë. Choreography by Pasquale Borri. Pastiche created by an unknown hand from the airs of Pugni. Teatro di San Carlo, Naples. 1852. Premiere never took place.
- Lucilla. Choreography by P. Borri. Pastiche by Paolo Giorza from the airs of Pugni. Teatro La Fenice, Venice. Circa 1855-1856.
- Satanella (St. Petersburg production of Le Diable amoureux). Choreography by M. Petipa after Joseph Mazilier. Music by Napoléon Henri Reber and François Benoist. 30 October [O.S. 18 October] 1866.
- Les Dryades prétendues. Choreography by Pavel Gerdt. Music adapted from Pugni's score for Perrot's Éoline, ou La Dryade. Imperial Theatre of the Russian Museum of His Majesty Emperor Alexander III. 23 April [O.S. 11 April] 1899.
