= Arthur Saint-Léon =

French choreographer (1821–1870)

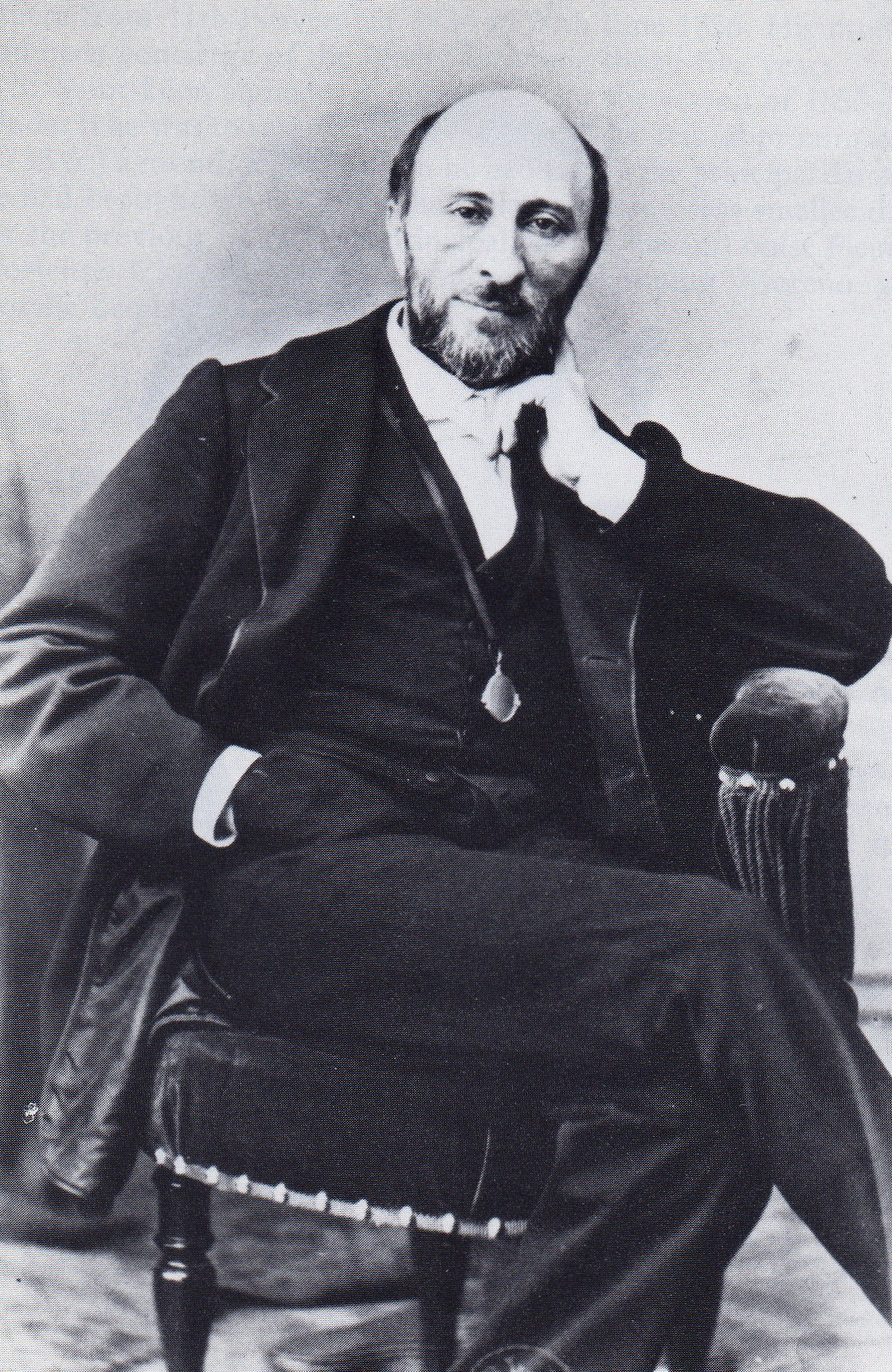
Photo by Bruno Braquehais of Maestro Arthur Saint-Léon. Paris, circa 1865

Arthur Saint-Léon (17 September 1821, in Paris – 2 September 1870) was the Maître de Ballet of St. Petersburg Imperial Ballet from 1859 until 1869 and is famous for creating the choreography of the ballet Coppélia.

== Biography ==
He was born Charles Victor Arthur Michel in Paris, but was raised in Stuttgart, where his father was dance master for the court and the theatre ballet. Saint-Léon was encouraged by his father, who had also been a dancer of the Paris Opéra Ballet, to study music and dance. Saint-Léon studied violin with Joseph Mayseder and Niccolò Paganini. At the same time, he studied ballet so he could perform both as violinist and dancer.

When he was 17 years old, he made his début as first demi-charactére dancer at the Théâtre de la Monnaie in Brussels. He started to tour across Europe dancing in Germany, Italy, England, obtaining a lot of success. In particular, the London audience, who did not like at that time to see men dancing on stage, liked him very much. He was much appreciated for his tours and his jumps. He was able to gain applause in every theatre he danced, and this was not very common in the Romantic Era, where the only star on stage was the Ballerina dancing en pointe.

When in Vienna, Saint-Léon could dance for the first time with Fanny Cerrito and from that very moment the two of them became almost indivisible, until they married in 1845. For Cerrito, Saint-Léon choreographed a ballet that was a hit in London La Vivandière (1843). He created also ballets for the Teatro La Fenice in Venice and for the Paris Opéra.

He became the teacher of the master class at the Opéra and he was in charge to choreograph the divertissements of the most important ballet production. He parted from his wife in 1851 and when she was invited to dance at the Opéra, Saint-Léon retired.

After touring across Europe, (he also worked three years for the Teatro San Carlos in Lisbon), he was invited to succeed Jules Perrot in 1859 as Maître de Ballet to the Imperial Bolshoi Kamenny Theatre, home of the Tsar's renowned Imperial Ballet, in St. Petersburg, Russia, a post which he held until 1869 (he was succeeded by Marius Petipa).

His favorite ballerina was Adèle Grantzow who performed a lot in his ballets. Saint-Léon brought her to Paris Opera and later to Italy, his intention was also to make Coppélia (1870) for her. Although he choreographed many ballets it's the only one that has come down to us almost complete. He died two days after the ballet's initial season had come to an untimely end because of the Franco-Prussian War. In late November, the creator of Swanhilda, Giuseppina Bozzachi, died on her 17th birthday.

Saint-Léon is famous also because he invented a method of ballet notation described in the book: La Sténochoréographie, ou Art d'écrire promptement la danse published in 1852. It is the first method of choreographic notation which documented not only the feet but also the movements of the arms, torso and the head.

== The La Vivandière Pas de Six ==
In 1848 Saint-Léon notated a Pas de Six from his 1846 ballet La Vivandière in La Sténochorégraphie. The notation was preserved in the archives of the Paris Opéra, and in 1975 the dance notation expert Ann Hutchinson-Guest and the Balletmaster Pierre Lacotte reconstructed Saint-Léon's choreography and Cesare Pugni's music for the Joffrey Ballet. In 1978 Lacotte staged the Pas de Six for the Kirov/Mariinsky Ballet (the former Imperial Ballet), who still retain it in their repertory. The Pas de Six has since been staged by many ballet companies all over the world, and is known as either the La Vivandière Pas de Six, or the Markitenka Pas de Six (as it is known is Russia). The Pas de Six is the only known choreography of Saint-Léon's to have survived.

== Main Choreographies ==
- 1843 La Vivandière (mus. Cesare Pugni)
- 1847 La Fille de marbre (mus. Cesare Pugni, after Alma, ou la Fille de feu by Jules Perrot)
- 1849 Le Violon du Diable (mus. Cesare Pugni). Here, Saint-Léon performed both as dancer and violinist.
- 1850 Stella (mus. Cesare Pugni)
- 1860 Graziella ou La Querelle amoureuse (mus. Cesare Pugni)
- 1861 La Perle de Seville (mus. Cesare Pugni)
- 1864 Fiametta (mus. Ludwig Minkus)
- 1864 The Little Humpbacked Horse (mus. Cesare Pugni)
- 1866 Le Poisson doré (mus. Ludwig Minkus)
- 1866 La Source (mus. Ludwig Minkus and Léo Delibes)
- 1869 Le Lys (mus. Ludwig Minkus) Here, Minkus re-used much of the music he wrote for La Source.
- 1870 Coppélia (mus. L. Delibes)

== See also ==
- Luigi Astolfi
