= La Fille de marbre =

Ballet-pantomime in 2 acts by Arthur Saint-Léon

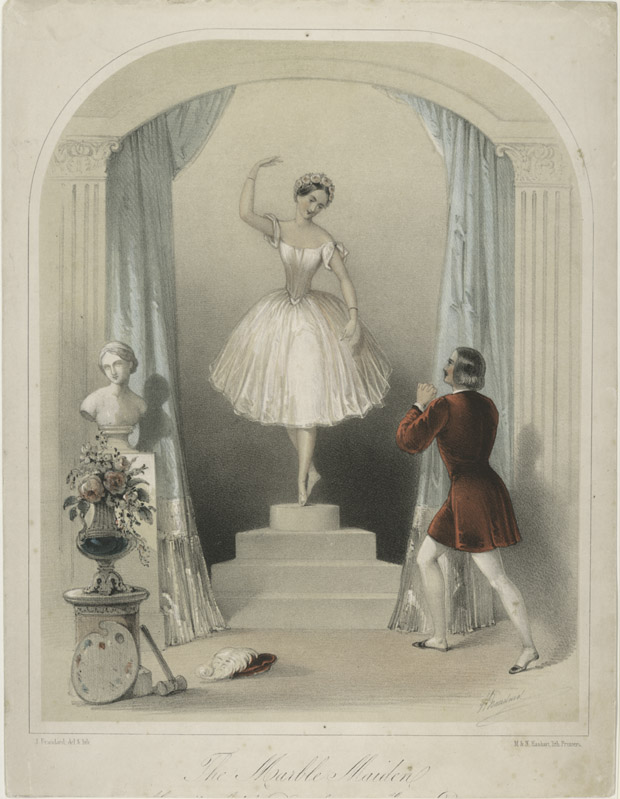

La Fille de marbre is a ballet-pantomime in 2 acts by Arthur Saint-Léon, with music by Cesare Pugni, premiered on 20 October 1847 at the Opéra de Paris.

The main roles were held by Fanny Cerrito and Arthur Saint-Léon, who were making their debut at the Opéra de Paris. The ballet master Germain Quériau was also part of the cast.

Théophile Gautier, an uncompromising critic, raised many improbabilities that did not prevent the public to give a triumphant welcome to the couple who would become famous.
