= La Vivandière or Markitenka =

Ballet in one act

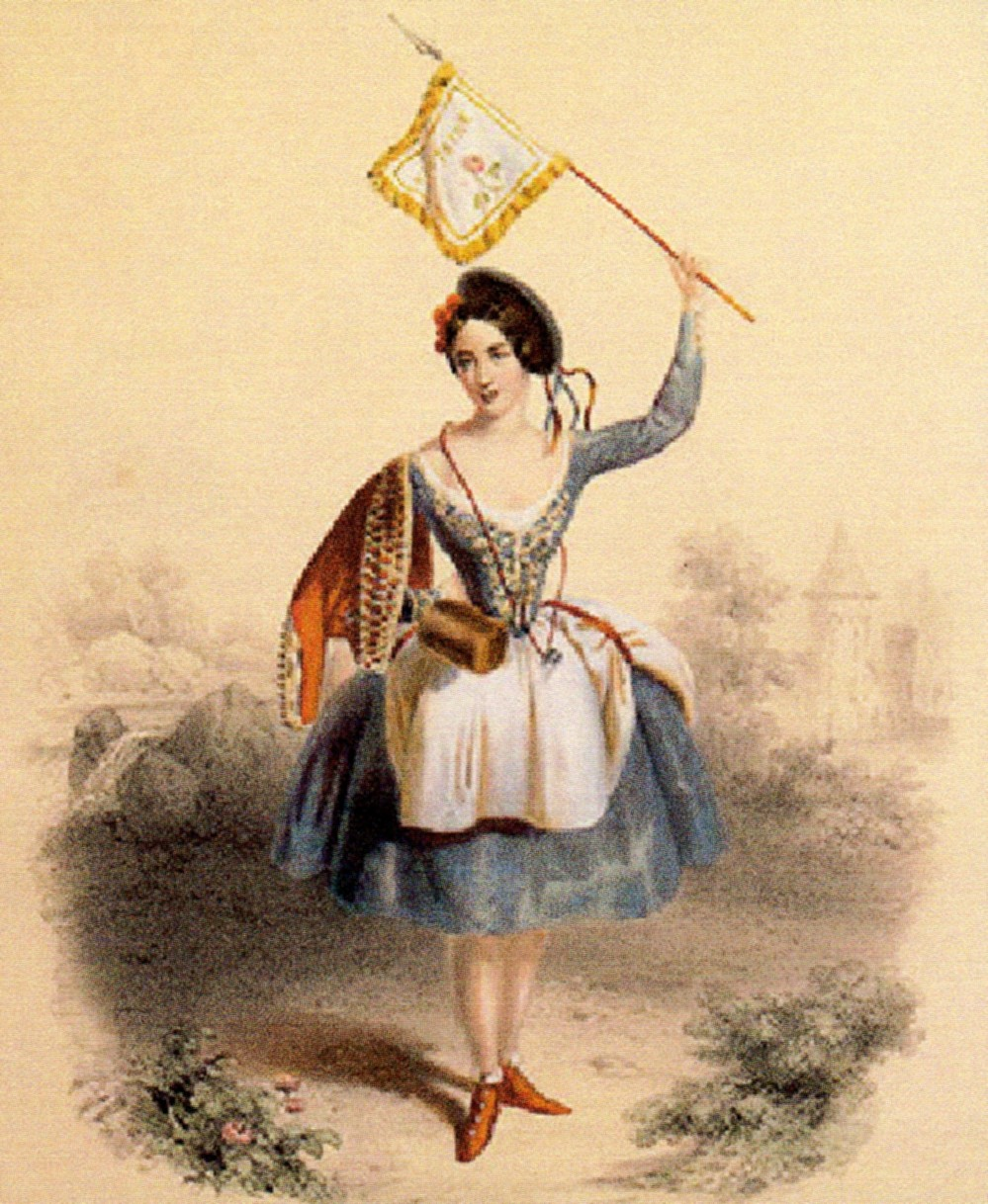
Fanny Cerrito as Kathi in the Saint-Léon/Cerrito/Pugni La Vivandière, London, 1844

La Vivandière (or Markitenka, as it is known in Russia) is a ballet in one act with choreography by Arthur Saint-Léon and Fanny Cerrito, and music by Cesare Pugni.

The ballet was first presented on 23 May 1844 by the Ballet of Her Majesty's Theatre, London, England. The principal dancers were Fanny Cerrito (as Kathi, the Vivandière) and Arthur Saint-Léon (as Hans).

== Revivals/Restagings ==
- Revivals by Arthur Saint-Léon for the Ballet of Her Majesty's Theatre - 1845, 1846, and 1848.
- Restaging by Jules Perrot for the Imperial Ballet under the title Markitenka, first presented on 13/25 December (Julian/Gregorian calendar dates), 1855 at the Imperial Bolshoi Kamenny Theatre, in St. Petersburg, Russia. Principal Dancers - Maria Surovshchikova-Petipa (as Kathi, the Vivandière), and Jules Perrot (as Hans).
- Revival by Marius Petipa for the Imperial Ballet, first presented on 8/20 October 1881 at the Imperial Mariinsky Theatre, in St. Petersburg, Russia.

== The La Vivandière Pas de Six ==
- A Pas de Six from Saint-Léon's original version of this ballet was notated in his own method of dance notation known as La Sténochorégraphie as an example, in a manual book that was published in Paris (1848). In 1975 the Pas de Six was reconstructed, along with Pugni's original music, by the dance notation expert Ann Hutchinson-Guest. In 1978 Pierre Lacotte staged the piece for the Kirov/Mariinsky Ballet (the former Imperial Ballet), who still retain the piece in their repertory. The Pas de Six has since been staged by many ballet companies all over the world, and is known as either the La Vivandière Pas de Six, or the Markitenka Pas de Six (as it is known in Russia).

The La Vivandière Pas de Six has been realised on a DVD/Blu ray.
