= The Benevolent Cupid =

1868 ballet by Marius Petipa

The Benevolent Cupid (French: L'Amour bienfaiteur) is a ballet in one act, with libretto and choreography by Marius Petipa and music by Cesare Pugni, first presented by students of the Imperial Ballet School on the stage of the school's theatre, on March 6/18 (Julian/Gregorian calendar dates), 1868, in St. Petersburg, Russia.
