= The Two Stars =

1871 ballet by Marius Petipa

The Two Stars or The Stars or The Two Little Stars (aka Les Deux étoiles) is an Anacreontic ballet in 1 act, with choreography by Marius Petipa, and music by Cesare Pugni. Libretto by Marius Petipa, based on an ancient Greek myth.

First presented by the Imperial Ballet on January 31/February 6 (Julian/Gregorian calendar dates), 1871 at the Imperial Bolshoi Kamenny Theatre, St. Petersburg, Russia. Principal Dancers- Ekaterina Vazem (as the First Star), Alexandra Virginia (as The Second Star), and Pavel Gerdt (as Apollo)

== Revivals/Restagings ==
- Restaging by Marius Petipa for the Ballet of the Moscow Imperial Bolshoi Theatre as The Two Little Stars. First presented on February 25/March 3, 1878 in Moscow, Russia.
- Revival by Ivan Clustine for the Ballet of the Moscow Imperial Bolshoi Theatre as The Stars. First presented on January 14/26, 1897 in Moscow, Russia. Principal Dancers - Ekaterina Geltzer (as the First Star), Adelaide Giuri (as the Second Star), and Vasily Tikhomirov (as Mars).
- Revival by Enrico Cecchetti for the Imperial Ballet, with Riccardo Drigo making additions and revising Cesare Pugni's original score. First presented at the Imperial Mariinsky Theatre on November 1/14 1900 in St. Petersburg, Russia. Principal Dancers - Olga Preobrajenskaya (as the First Star), Nadezhda Bakerkina (as the Second Star), Nikolai Legat as Apollo, and Sergei Lukianov (as Mars)
