= Turčinović =

Turčinović (Serbian: Турчиновић) is a South Slavic patronymic surname meaning "son of Turčin", i.e., "son of a person with the nickname Turk". Notable people with the name include:

- Ana Turčinović (born 1993), Montenegrin basketball player
- Lidija Turčinović, Serbian-French basketball player
- FIlip Turčinović (born 1951), Serbian lawyer and university professor

== See also ==
- Turczynowicz, Polish variant
