= Luigi Astolfi =

Italian composer

- Born: 1790s Lombardy
- Died: 1860s Milan
- Occupations: Dancer, choreographer, composer

Luigi Astolfi (Italian pronunciation: [luˈiːdʒi aˈstɔlfi]; 1790s–1860s) was an Italian dancer, choreographer and composer.

== Life ==
Luigi Astolfi was born in Lombardy in the 1790s.

In 1817 he had his first success as a dancer performing Osvaldo e Olfrida by Giuseppe Sorrentino at the Teatro San Benedetto in Venice.

In the following years he also started to practise as a choreographer, especially in Lisbon and, to a lesser extent, also in Porto, in Vienna, and in Russia, but with less success; performances of Belisario and Gli esiliati in Siberia (1831) by Gaetano Donizetti, and La muette de Portici by Daniel Auber (1838) were warmly received by critics and audience.

Later he was also composed the music that he performed as a dancer; his first success was Le sette reclute, performed for the first time in 1832 at the Teatro alla Canobbiana in Milan. Again at the Canobbiana in 1837 I minatori di Salerno was performed for the first time: this was his most performed ballet, not only by Astolfi himself but also by other performers; this was the only work by Astolfi to be performed after his death.

He was premier danseur of both Italian and Portuguese dancers at the Royal Theatre of Saint John in Lisbon until the season 1839–40, which was a complete failure for Astolfi. He experienced other failures in Crema and Bergamo in 1837 and at the Teatro Carignano in Turin in 1842.

In 1840 he married dancer and leading pantomimic actress Fanny Mazzarelli.

He was the composer and choreographer of La Encantadora de Madrid, performed in the season 1845–46 at the Teatro Regio in Turin, starring Fanny Cerrito and Arthur Saint-Léon.

In 1855 he retired to private life in Milan, where he died in the 1860s.

== Sources ==
- Fernanda Mariani Borroni (1962). "Astolfi, Luigi". Dizionario Biografico degli Italiani (in Italian). Volume 4. Istituto dell'Enciclopedia Italiana.
