= Yekaterina Sankovskaya =

Russian ballet dancer

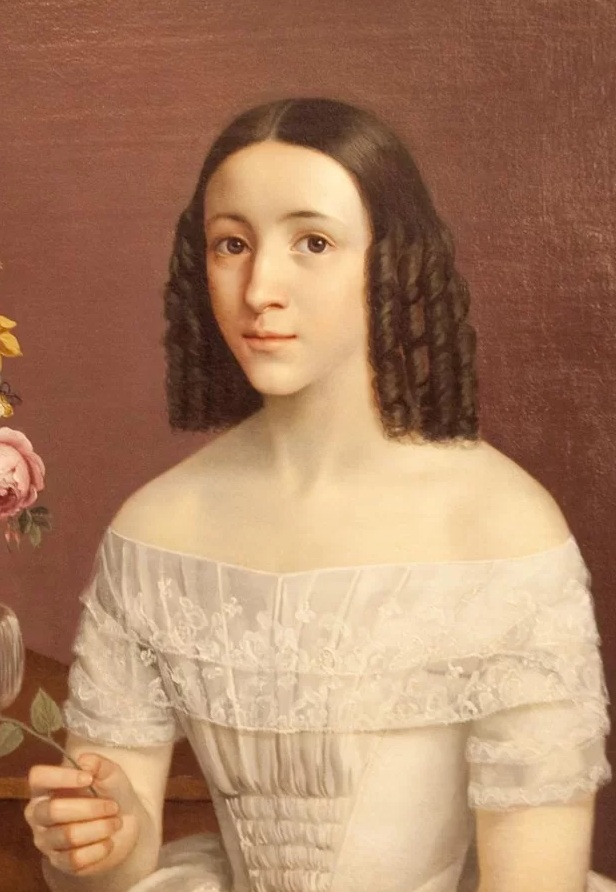

Ekaterina Sankovskaya (ru: Екатерина Александровна Санковская; 11(23) November 1816 in Moscow – 28 August 1878 in Moscow) was a Russian dancer who graduated from the Moscow Bolshoi Ballet School in 1836. She was prima ballerina of the Moscow Imperial troupe (actors worked in Bolshoi and Maly theatres of Moscow).

== Life ==
She came from a poor family, and it was given to the drama school at the Moscow Imperial troupe, where the education was conducted at public expense. Her teacher was Félicité Hullin Sor, which drew attention to the talented girl and worked with her not only during the lessons but also after school. Among other teachers: Russian philosopher N. A. Nadezhdin taught literature, Mikhail Semenovich Shchepkin taught art of acting.

After graduation, Sankovskyay was admitted to the Moscow Imperial troupe. She soon became a star of ballet and performed all the main roles.

Revered by many Russians for her celebrated performances in the title roles of such works as Giselle and La Esmeralda, Sankovskaya was among the most admired ballerinas of her time in Moscow.

The glory of dancer brought the performance in the ballet "La Sylphide" on 6 September 1837. At this time Philippe Taglioni and Marie Taglioni worked at the St. Petersburg Imperial troupe, and on the same day, September 6, 1837, Maria Taglioni performed the same role in St. Petersburg. But both great dancers performed this role in different ways: La Sylphide of Taglioni, resigned to the circumstances, took the audience into the world of dreams, while Sankovskaya create an image of fighter protesting against reality. The beauty of the ballerinas it was cited in the Russian newspapers.

M. E. Saltykov-Shchedrin called Ekaterina Sankovskaya "soul of the Moscow ballet".

She worked on stage for almost 20 years: 1835 – 1854.

At the end of life she some time she gave private lessons. She taught ballroom dance in private houses after retiring in 1854. One of her pupils was the future theatre director Konstantin Stanislavsky.
