= Ondine, ou La naïade =

Ballet in three acts and six scenes

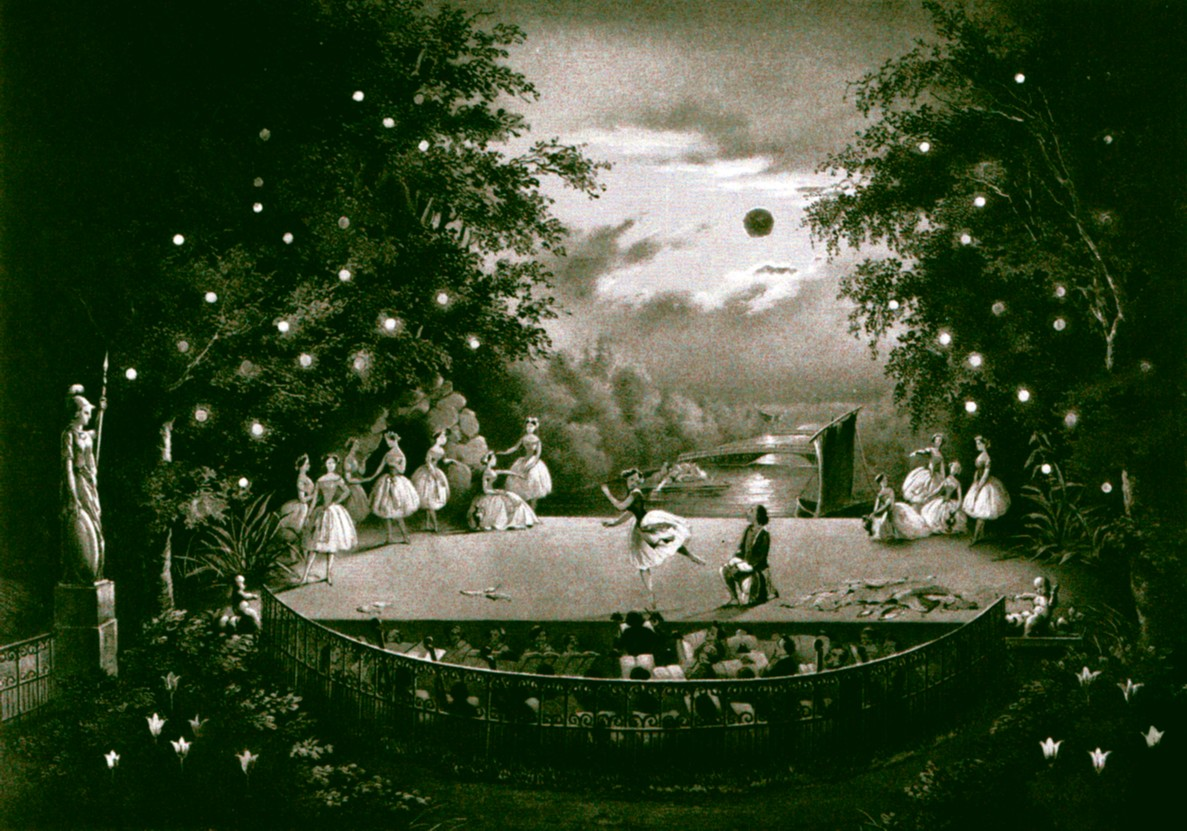
A performance of Perrot's La naïade et le pêcheur at Peterhof Palace. July, 1851

Ondine, ou La naïade is a ballet in three acts and six scenes with choreography by Jules Perrot, music by Cesare Pugni, and a libretto inspired by the novel Undine by Friedrich de la Motte Fouqué. Pugni dedicated his score to Augusta, Duchess of Cambridge, a long-time balletomane and patron of the arts in London. Whilst the original London production used the title Ondine, ou La naïade, Perrot staged a revival of the ballet under the title, La naïade et le pêcheur, a title which was used for all subsequent productions of the ballet.

== History ==
The ballet was first presented by the ballet of Her Majesty's Theatre, London on 22 June 1843. Fanny Cerrito danced the title rôle, while Perrot himself played her mortal beloved, the fisherman Mattéo.

The original scenery was designed by William Grieve. A contemporary review described it as " ... one of the most beautiful productions that any stage ever boasted of." and praised Cerrito as a " ... step-revealing goddess."

Cesare Pugni's score was hailed as a masterwork of ballet music. The Times, a London newspaper, described Pugni's score as

... singularly appropriate, quite descriptive, and adds charm and perfection to the ballet. In the scene where the young fisherman Mattéo is conveyed into the depths of the sea, and the naiads dance their many fascinations around him, the musical accompaniments which describe the rise and fall of the waves are eminently characteristic and beautiful: the very ripple of the flow, and the rushing sound of the ebb over the pebbly strand are heard, and fully satisfy the ear.

== Plot ==
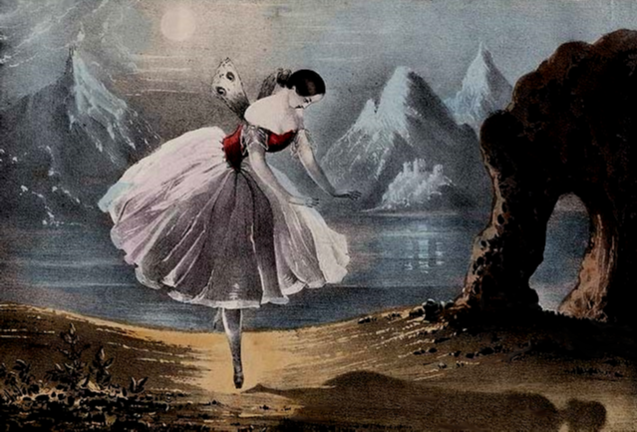
Currier and Ives illustration

The ballet bore little resemblance to de la Motte Fouqué's Undine:

The plot is no more like the romantic baron's story than it is like that of Robinson Crusoe, excepting so far as a water-nymph is the heroine. Therefore, the readers of Undine have to unlearn all they know, if they would avoid mystification while witnessing the marvels of the new ballet.

Their only point in common appears to be the ill-fated love of a water sprite, Ondine, with for a mortal man who already has a mortal sweetheart. However, the ballet's divergence from the original novel "derive from intermediary works linking the book and the ballet, which Perrot used to enrich and enhance his theatrical conception". The greatest changes that Perrot made to the basic plot were the change of location from the darkly evocative Danube to the sunnier shores of Sicily, and the transformation of the aristocratic Sir Huldbrand into the humble fisherman Matteo, while Undine's rival Bertalda became the orphan Giannina. In many ways, Perrot's ballet is more similar to René-Charles Guilbert de Pixerécourt's play of the story, Ondine, ou la Nymphe des Eaux, which was first presented in Paris in 1830 while Perrot was also performing there.

== Revival ==
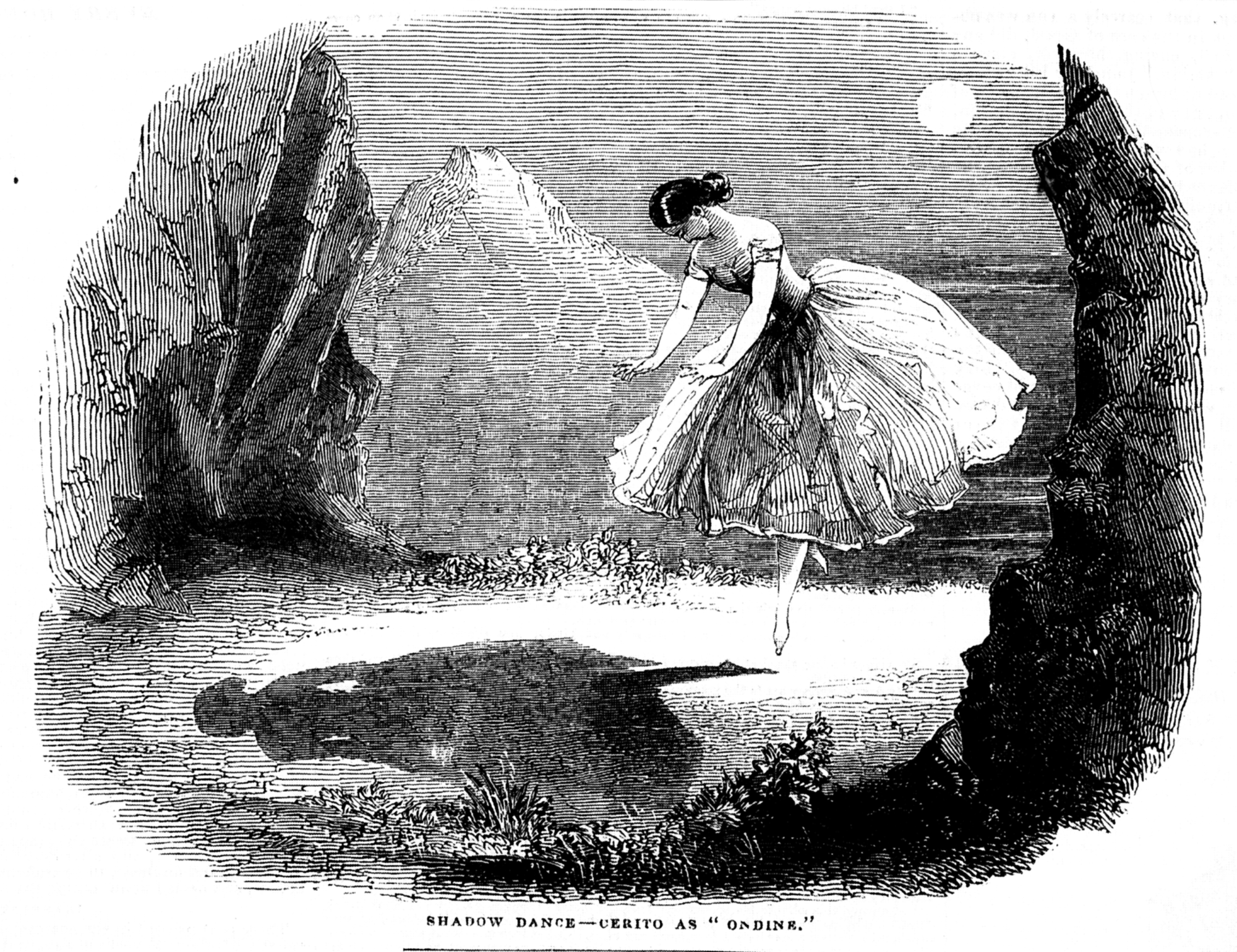
Lithograph of Fanny Cerrito in the Pas de l'ombre from the original production of Ondine, ou La naïade at Her Maejesty's Theatre. London, 1843.

During his engagement as Premier Maître de Ballet of the St. Petersburg Imperial Theatres in Russia, Jules Perrot presented an elaborately expanded production of Ondine, ou La Naïade under the title La Naïade et le pêcheur (The Naiad and the Fisherman) at the Imperial Bolshoi Kamenny Theatre on 11 February [O.S. 30 January] 1851. For the production, Cesare Pugni, who had accompanied Perrot to Russia, extensively revised and expanded his original score of 1843. The production premiered to great success.

On 23 July [O.S. 11 July] 1851, Perrot presented his production for a performance at Peterhof Palace staged especially for the celebrations held in honor of the name-day of the Grand Duchess Olga Nikolaevna, daughter of Emperor Nicholas I. For the performance, a stage was erected above the water of the lake of the Ozerky Pavilion.

Marius Petipa revived Perrot's La Naïade et le pêcheur for the Imperial Ballet on several occasions throughout his career as Premier Maître de Ballet during the latter half of the 19th century. In 1867 he revised much of the choreography for the performance of Ekaterina Vazem, with Pugni composing two new variations especially for her performance. Petipa later staged his own complete revivals of the full-length work:

- 7 November [O.S. 26 October] 1874 for the prima ballerina Eugenia Sokolova, with musical revisions by Ludwig Minkus.
- 2 October [O.S. 20 September] 1892 for the prima ballerina Anna Johansson, with musical revisions by Riccardo Drigo.

Cesare Pugni's grandson, Second Maître de Ballet of the Imperial Theatres and former premier danseur Alexander Shiryaev, mounted a revival of La Naïade et le pêcheur especially for the prima ballerina Anna Pavlova. The revival premiered on 20 December [O.S. 7 December] 1903, and was the last revival of Perrot's ballet staged in Imperial Russia, though the full-length ballet continued being performed by the Leningrad ballet until 1931.

The Ballet Master Pierre Lacotte staged a revival of Perrot's ballet under the title Ondine for the Kirov/Mariinsky Ballet, a production that opened on 16 March 2006 at the Mariinsky Theatre of St. Petersburg, Russia, with a new version of Cesare Pugni's score assembled from his original composition of 1843 and his revised edition of 1851.

Sir Frederick Ashton paid tribute to Perrot in his own choreography for Hans Werner Henze's music for Ondine by incorporating his own version of the Shadow Dance into the first act.
