= Konstancja Turczynowicz =

Konstancja Turczynowicz (1818 – 1880), was a Polish ballet dancer. She belonged to the more well known ballet dancers in Poland during her career.

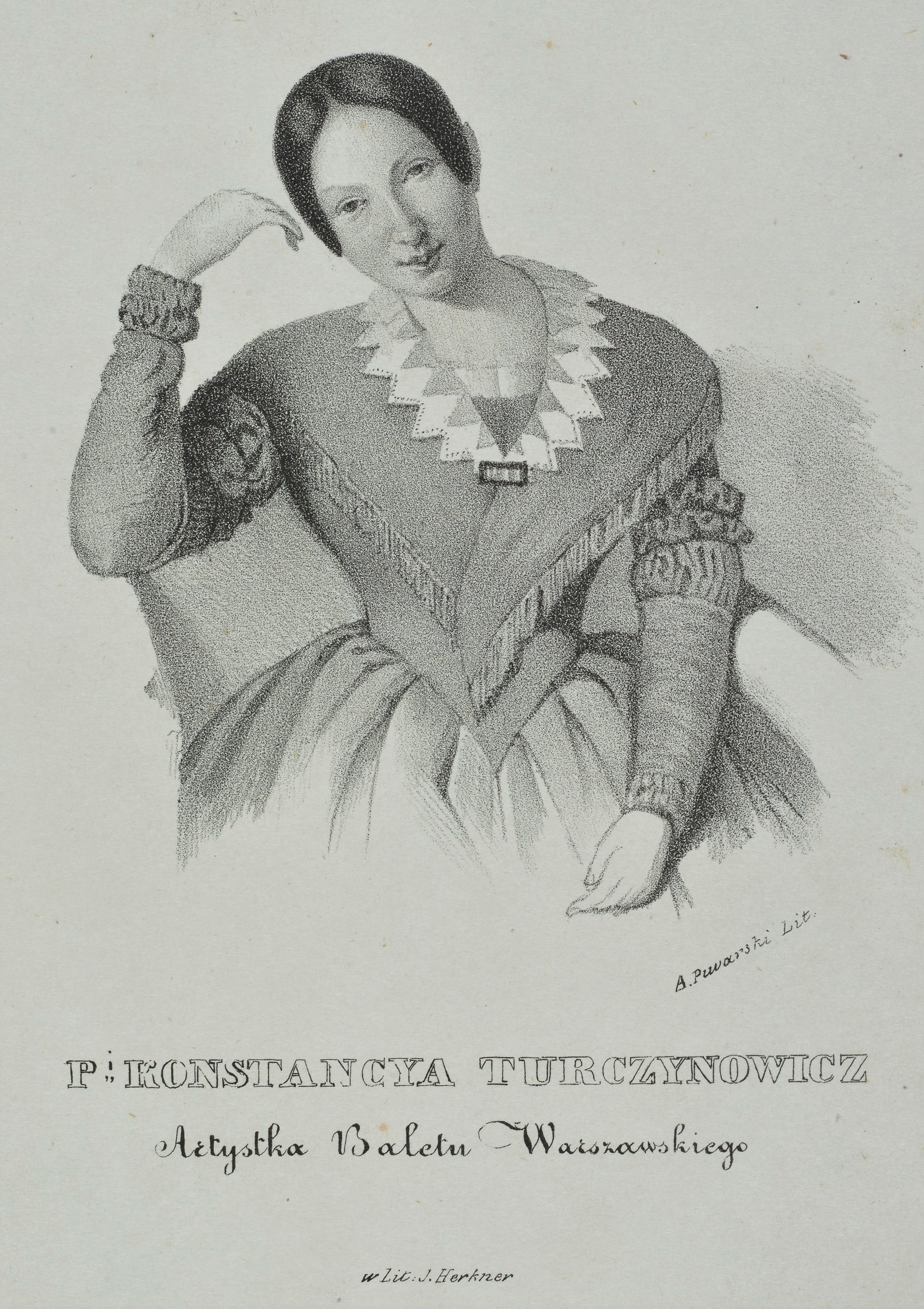
The picture of Konstancja Turczynowicz, the first dancer of the Warsaw Theatre Directorate (of the Grand Theatre in Warszaw) in 1843-1853

She was engaged in the Ballet at the National Theatre, Warsaw between 1843 and 1853. She was a ballet instructor at the same institution in 1853-1863. She has been referred to as the most noted ballerina in Poland during the romantic era. She was the first Polish ballerina to interpret the role of Giselle.
