= Adalbert Gyrowetz =

Czech-Austrian composer (1763–1850)

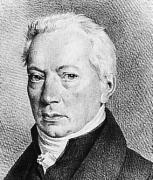
Adalbert Gyrowetz

Adalbert Gyrowetz (Czech: Vojtěch Matyáš Jírovec; 20 February 1763 – 19 March 1850) was a Czech-Austrian composer. He mainly wrote instrumental works, with a great production of string quartets and symphonies; his operas and singspiele numbered more than 30, including Semiramide (1791), Der Augenarzt (1811), and Robert, oder Die Prüfung (1815).

== Biography ==
Gyrowetz was born 20 February 1763 in České Budějovice. His father was the choirmaster in the cathedral there, and Adalbert first studied with him. He then travelled to Prague, where he studied law but continued to learn music.

At around this time Gyrowetz was in the employ of Count Franz von Fünfkirchen in Brno, whose employees were all musicians. Here he started composing (among other things) symphonies, of which he was eventually to write more than 60. In 1785, he moved to Vienna and met Wolfgang Amadeus Mozart, who performed one of Gyrowetz's symphonies in the same year. From 1786 to around 1793, he travelled throughout Europe. He spent some time in Paris, where he established that some symphonies that had been published as the work of Joseph Haydn were in fact his work. He spent three years in Italy, meeting Johann Wolfgang von Goethe in Rome and studying with Nicola Sala in Naples. In 1791 he met Haydn, whom he idolized, in London. While in London, he was commissioned by Johann Peter Salomon to compose symphonies to be performed at Salomon's Hanover Square Rooms concerts.

Gyrowetz moved back to Vienna and in 1804 was appointed Vice-kapellmeister of the Court Theatre. Gyrowetz was an important part of Viennese musical society well into the 1820s and even arranged the piano reduction of Rossini's Zelmira in 1822. He was one of the pallbearers at Beethoven's funeral in 1827. Gyrowetz died 19 March 1850 in Vienna.

== Selected works ==
Operas (all composed in Vienna unless otherwise stated)

- Semiramis (1791 - lost in a London Theatre fire)
- Selico (1804)
- Mirana, die Königin der Amazonen (1806)
- Agnes Sorel (1806)
- Ida, die büssende (1807)
- Die Junggesellen-Wirtschaft (1807)
- Emericke (1807)
- Die Pagen des Herzogs von Vendôme (1808)
- Der Sammtrock (1809)
- Der betrogene Betrüger (1810)
- Das zugemauerte Fenster (1810)
- Der Augenarzt (1811)
- Federica ed Adolfo (1812)
- Das Winterquartier in America (1812)
- Robert, oder Die Prüfung (1815)
- Helene (1816)
- Die beiden Eremiten (1816)
- Der Gemahl von ungefähr (1816)
- Die beiden Savoyarden (1817)
- Il finto Stanislao (Milan, 1818)
- Aladin (1819)
- Das Ständchen (1823)
- Des Kaisers Genesung (1826)
- Der blinde Harfner (1827)
- Der Geburtstag (1828)
- Der dreizehnte Mantel (1829)
- Felix und Adele (1831)
- Hans Sachs im vorgerückten Alter (1834 Dresden)

More than 60 symphonies, including:

- Symphony in E♭ major, Op. 0, No. 1
- Symphony in B♭ major, Op. 0, No. 2
- Symphony in D major, Op. 0, No. 3
- Symphony in E♭ major, Op. 6, No. 2, 'Jupiter'
- Symphony in F major, Op. 6, No. 3
- Symphony in E♭ major, Op. 8, 'Great'
- Symphony in D major, Op. 9, No. 1
- Symphony in F major, Op. 9, No. 3
- Symphony in D major, Op. 13, No. 1
- Symphony in C major, Op. 13, No. 3
- Symphony in C major, Op. 23, No. 3
- Symphony in D major, Op. 24, No. 1

About 60 string quartets, including:

- Three String Quartets, Op. 1a: C major, G major, B♭ major
- Six String Quartets, Op. 2
- Three String Quartets, Op. 3: D major, G major, E♭ major
- Six String Quartets, Op. 4
- Three String Quartets, Op. 13: D major, C major, E♭ major
- Three String Quartets, Op. 16
- Six String Quartets, Op. 17: F major, G minor, G major
- Three String Quartets, Op. 19: (No. 2 also for Flute Quartet)
- Three String Quartets, Op. 25: D major,
- Three String Quartets, Op. 29: E♭ major, G major,
- Three String Quartets, Op. 30
- Three String Quartets, Op. 42: D major, F major, C minor
- Three String Quartets, Op. 44: G major, B♭ major, A♭ major

40 Piano Sonatas with Violin and Violoncello accompaniment, including:

- Three Piano Trios, op. 10: A major, B♭ major, E♭ major
- Three Piano Trios, op. 14: C major, F major, D major
- Three Piano Trios, op. 15
- Three Piano Trios, op. 18: G major, B♭ major, E♭ major
- Three Piano Trios, op. 20: A major, F major, C minor
- Three Piano Trios, op. 22: G major, B♭ major, E♭ major
- Three Piano Trios, op. 23: D major, C major, E♭ major
- Three Piano Trios, op. 34: F major
- Three Piano Trios, op. 41: B♭ major, G major, D major (1800)
- Two Piano Trios, op. 45: B♭ major, D minor (1800)
- Divertimento for Piano Trio, op. 50
- Three Piano Trios, op. 51: F major, C major, A major
- Three Piano Trios, op. 55: D major, G major, F major
- Divertimento for Piano Trio, op. 57

12 Nocturnes for Piano with violin and violoncello accompaniment

- Nocturne for Piano, op. 21 in D major (1797)
- Nocturne in B♭ major (no. 4), E♭ major (no. 5), C major (no. 7), G major (no. 9), F major (no. 10)

Other miscellaneous chamber music, including:

- Six Flute Trios, Op. 4 or 6 or 11 (?)
- Adagio for Oboe and Orchestra, Op. 9
- Three Flute Quartets, Op. 11 (1795): D major, G major, C major
- Piano Concerto in F, Op. 26 (1796)
- Dritte Nachtmusik/Nocturne No. 3 for Flute Quartet, Op. 26
- Flute Quintet in E minor, Op. 39 (1800)
- Grand Trio Concertante in E♭ major for Clarinet, Cello and Piano, Op. 43
- String Quintet in C major (2 violins, 2 violas, and cello), Op. 45
- Piano Concerto in B♭, Op. 49 (1800)
- Variations faciles sur la marche de l'opéra Raoul Barbe-Bleue pour piano

== Recordings ==
- Symphony In E-flat Major and F Major, Op. 6 Nº. 2 and 3
- Three Flute Quartets. Op. 11. Nº 1, 2 and 3
- Symphony In D Major, Op. 12 Nº. 1
- Three String Quartets. Op. 29 Nº. 2; Op. 13 Nº. 1; Op. 29 Nº. 1 (2013)
- Grand Trio Concertante. Op. 43
- Three String Quartets. Op. 44
