= Carlotta Grisi =

Italian ballet dancer (1819–1899)

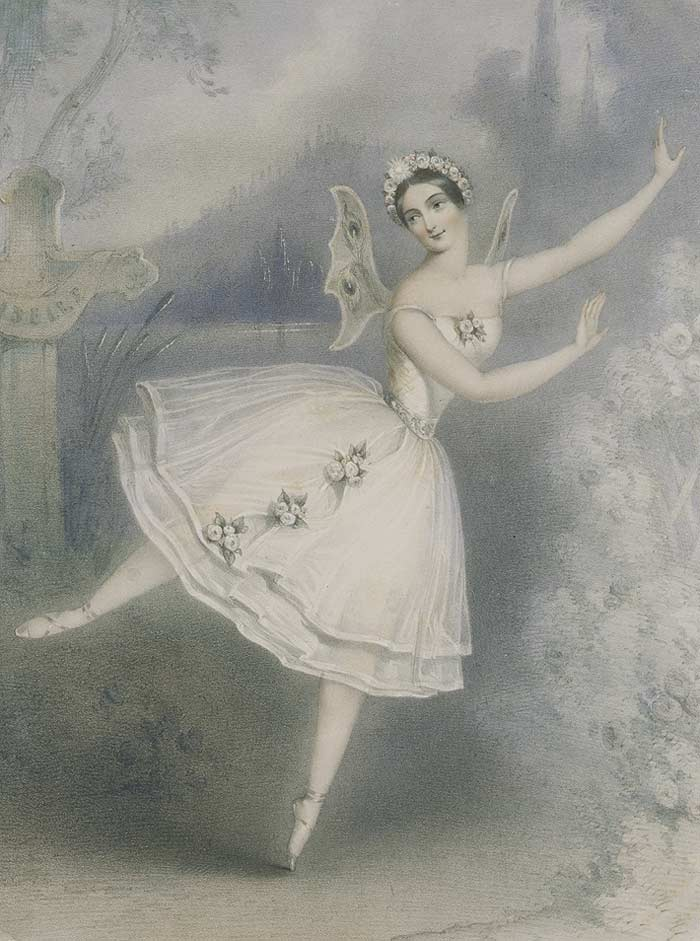
- Lithograph of Grisi in the title role of Adam's Giselle, Paris, 1841
- Born: Caronne Adele Josephine Marie Grisi; 28 June 1819; Visinada, Kingdom of Illyria, Austria–Hungary
- Died: 20 May 1899 (aged 79); Saint-Jean, Geneva, Switzerland
- Education: Teatro alla Scala
- Occupation: Ballet dancer
- Years active: 1836–1855
- Children: 2
- Relatives: Giuditta Grisi (cousin); Giulia Grisi (cousin); Judith Gautier (niece)

Carlotta Grisi (born Caronne Adele Josephine Marie Grisi; 28 June 1819 – 20 May 1899) was an Italian ballet dancer, especially noted for her performance in the classic role of Giselle.

== Biography ==
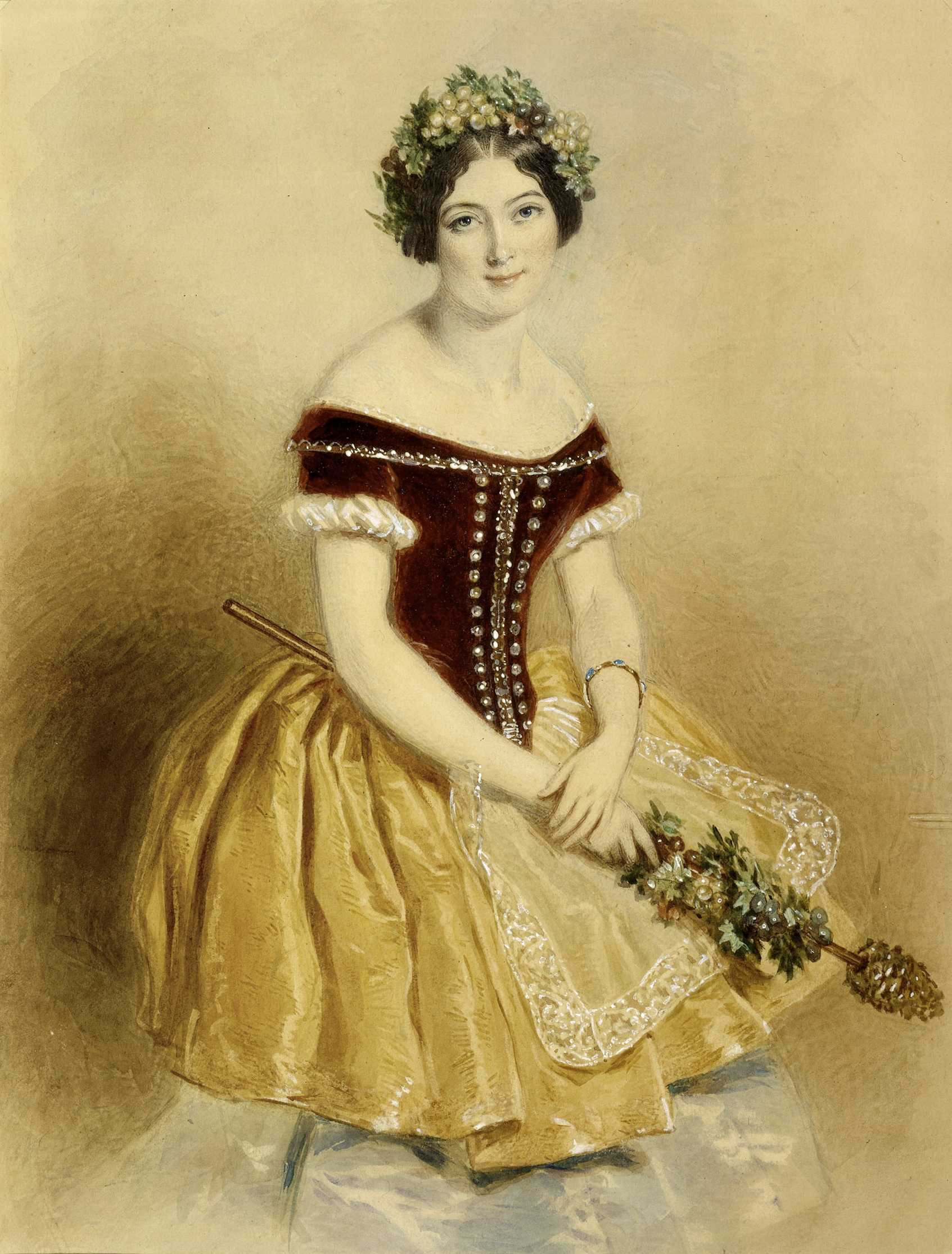
Lithograph of Carlotta Grisi in the title role of Giselle

Grisi was born in Visinada, Kingdom of Illyria (present-day Vižinada, Croatia). Although her parents were not involved in the theatre, she was brought up in an opera family. She was trained at the ballet school of Teatro alla Scala in Milan and later with dancer/balletmaster Jules Perrot.

At her 1836 debut in London, Grisi performed with the accomplished danseur Jules Perrot. She next appeared in Paris at the Théâtre de la Renaissance (1840) and a year later, toured with Perrot to other parts of Europe. Through Perrot's contacts, the pair worked in Paris, London, Vienna, Munich, and Milan where she sang and danced. Of her two talents, it was her dancing that was acclaimed. By dancing Perrot's choreography, which at that time was receiving great attention, she gained notable attention of both the public and the critics.

Her greatest role however was that of Giselle. The world première of this two-act ballet was on 28 June 1841 at the Théâtre de l'Académie Royale de Musique, Paris. The part of "Albrecht" was danced by Lucien Petipa (the brother of the great Marius Petipa), with the part of Myrtha, Queen of the Wilis danced by Adèle Dumilâtre. It caused a sensation and inspired its reviewers to proclaim Giselle to be the greatest ballet of its time and a triumphant successor to the Romantic masterwork La Sylphide. It immediately established Grisi as a star in her very first full-length ballet in Paris. Her salary grew from 5,000 francs to 12,000 in 1842 and 20,000 by 1844, with additional performance fees on top. It also marked the beginning of a change in her relationship with Jules Perrot.

Dance historian Lillian Moore says of her "In Grisi were united all the best attributes of the other outstanding ballerinas of the romantic period: the buoyant elevation of Taglioni, the technical virtuosity and mimic powers of Elssler, and the joyous, exuberant facility of Cerrito. If she could not claim to surpass her peers in any one aspect of her art, Grisi outstripped them all in versatility."

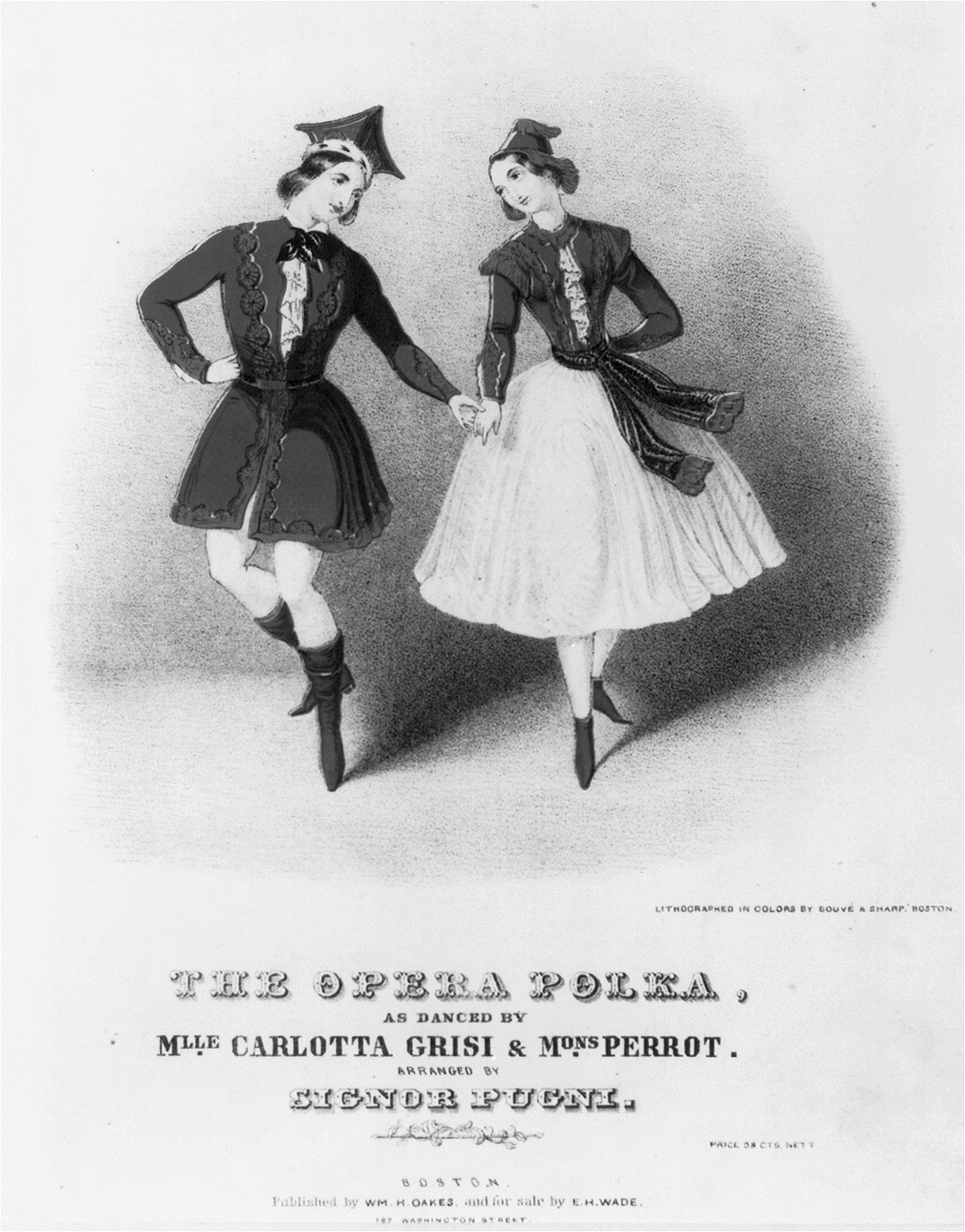
"The Opera Polka as danced by Mlle. Caroltta Grisi & Mons. Perrot" by Cesare Pugni (Boston: William H. Oakes, c. 1840s)

Grisi's last performance in the west was in Paul Taglioni's Les Métamorphoses (a.k.a. Satanella, 1849).

In 1850, she joined Perrot in St. Petersburg, Russia, where he had been appointed ballet master, and she danced Giselle at the Imperial Bolshoi Kamenny Theatre. The first Giselle in Russia had been danced by Fanny Elssler, and so the initial reaction to Grisi's interpretation of the role was not enthusiastic. However, over time the Russians appreciated her talents. She was prima ballerina of the St. Petersburg Imperial Theatres in St. Petersburg from 1850 to 1853, working not only with Perrot but also Joseph Mazilier who staged for her La Jolie Fille de Gand and Vert-Vert especially for her.

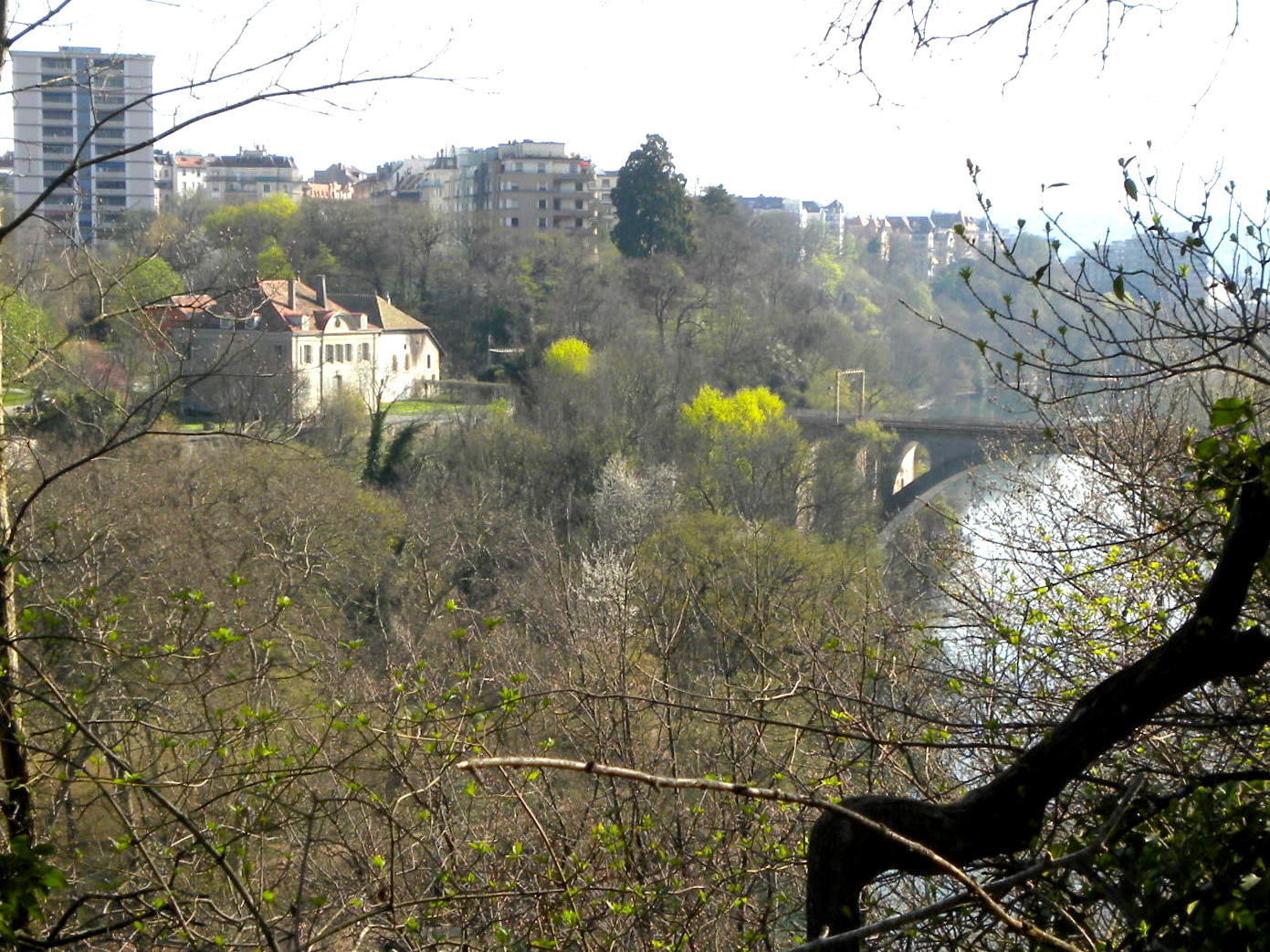
Saint-Jean, the district of Geneva in which Grisi retired in 1856

In 1854, with her daughter, Julie-Marie, she left Russia for Warsaw, where she intended to continue dancing. But she became pregnant by Prince Léon Radziwill, who persuaded her to retire from ballet at the height of her fame. Grisi gave birth to her second daughter, Léontine Grisi, in 1855 and at the age of 34 settled in Saint-Jean, Geneva to live at Villa Grisi (also called Villa Saint-Jean; no longer extant), for the next 46 years of her life in peaceful retirement. She died there on 20 May 1899, at age 79.

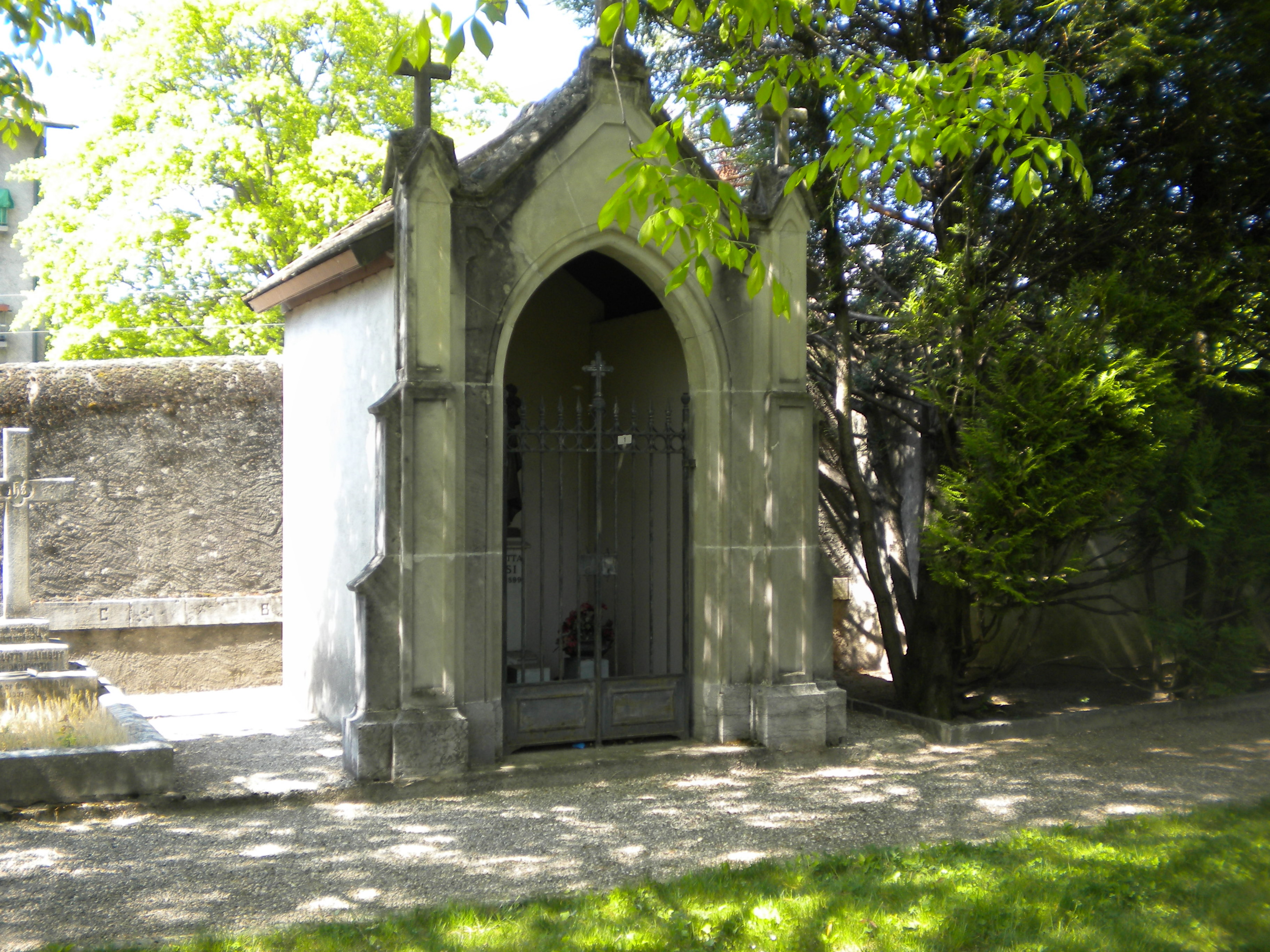
Grisi's sepulchral vault in a cemetery near Saint-Jean, Geneva

One of the creators of Giselle, Théophile Gautier, who was married to Carlotta's sister Ernestina, described her dancing as having a childlike artlessness, a happy and infectious gaiety. Carlotta Grisi was the cousin of the famous soprano singers, the sisters Giuditta and Giulia Grisi.

== Notable roles ==
- Created the title role of Giselle (Jules Perrot, Jean Coralli and Adolphe Adam. 1841).
- Created the dual role of Peri/Leila in the oriental La Péri (Jean Coralli and Friedrich Burgmüller. 1843).
- Created the title role in Paquita (Joseph Mazilier and Édouard Deldevez. 1844).
- Second ballerina in Pas de Quatre (Jules Perrot and Cesare Pugni. 1845).
- Created the role of Mazourka in Le Diable à quatre (Joseph Mazilier and Adolphe Adam. 1845).

== See also ==
- Women in dance
