= Jules Perrot =

French ballet dancer and choreographer (1810–1892)

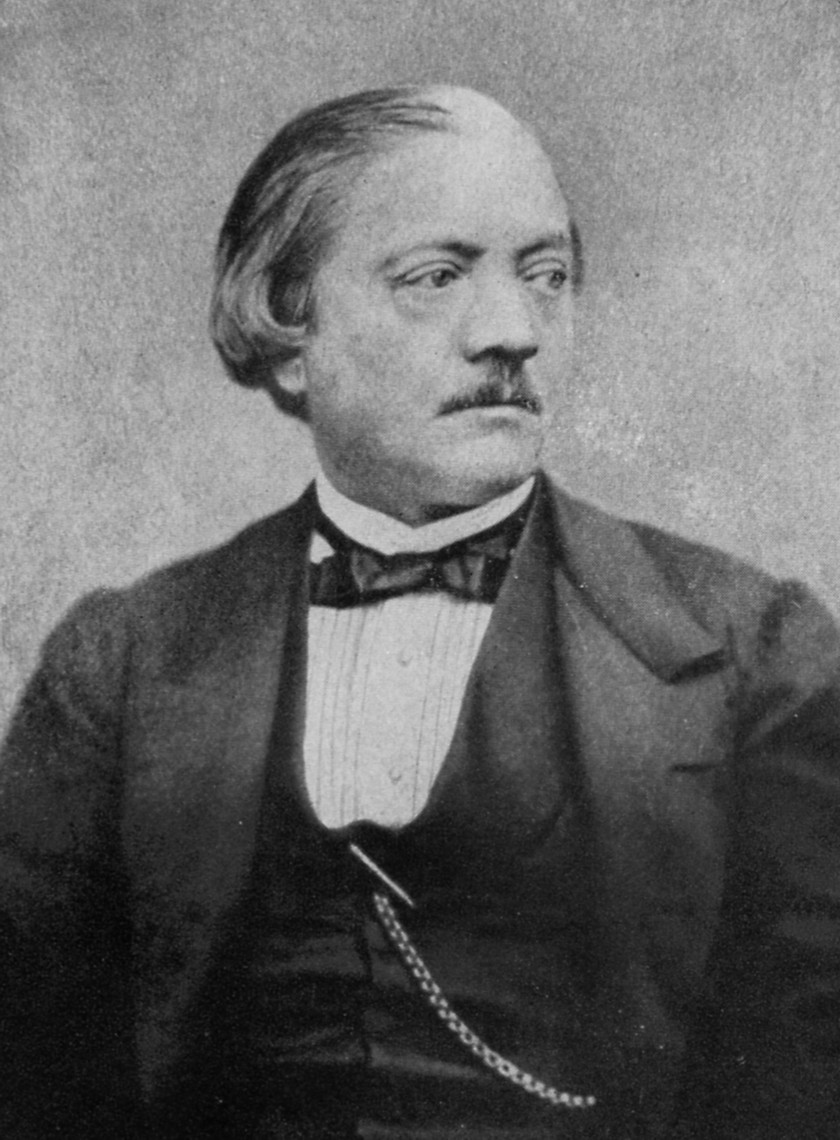
- Jules Perrot, c. 1850
- Born: Jules-Joseph Perrot; 18 August 1810; Lyon, France
- Died: 18 August 1892 (aged 82); Paramé, France
- Occupations: Dancer; choreographer
- Partner: Carlotta Grisi

Jules-Joseph Perrot (English: /pɛˈroʊ/ peh-ROH, French: [ʒyl ʒozɛf pɛʁo]; 18 August 1810 – 29 August 1892) was a French dancer and choreographer who later became Ballet Master of the Imperial Ballet in St. Petersburg, Russia. He created some of the most famous ballets of the 19th century including Pas de Quatre, La Esmeralda, Ondine, and Giselle with Jean Coralli.

== From dancer to balletmaster ==
The Lyon-born Perrot danced often with Marie Taglioni but their partnership was short-lived. She eventually refused to dance with him fearing that he would outshine her. He left the Opéra in 1835 to tour European dance centers such as London, Milan, Vienna and Naples, where he met and noticed the talent of Carlotta Grisi. He coached her and presented her to the world as the next great ballerina in an 1836 performance in London with himself as her partner.

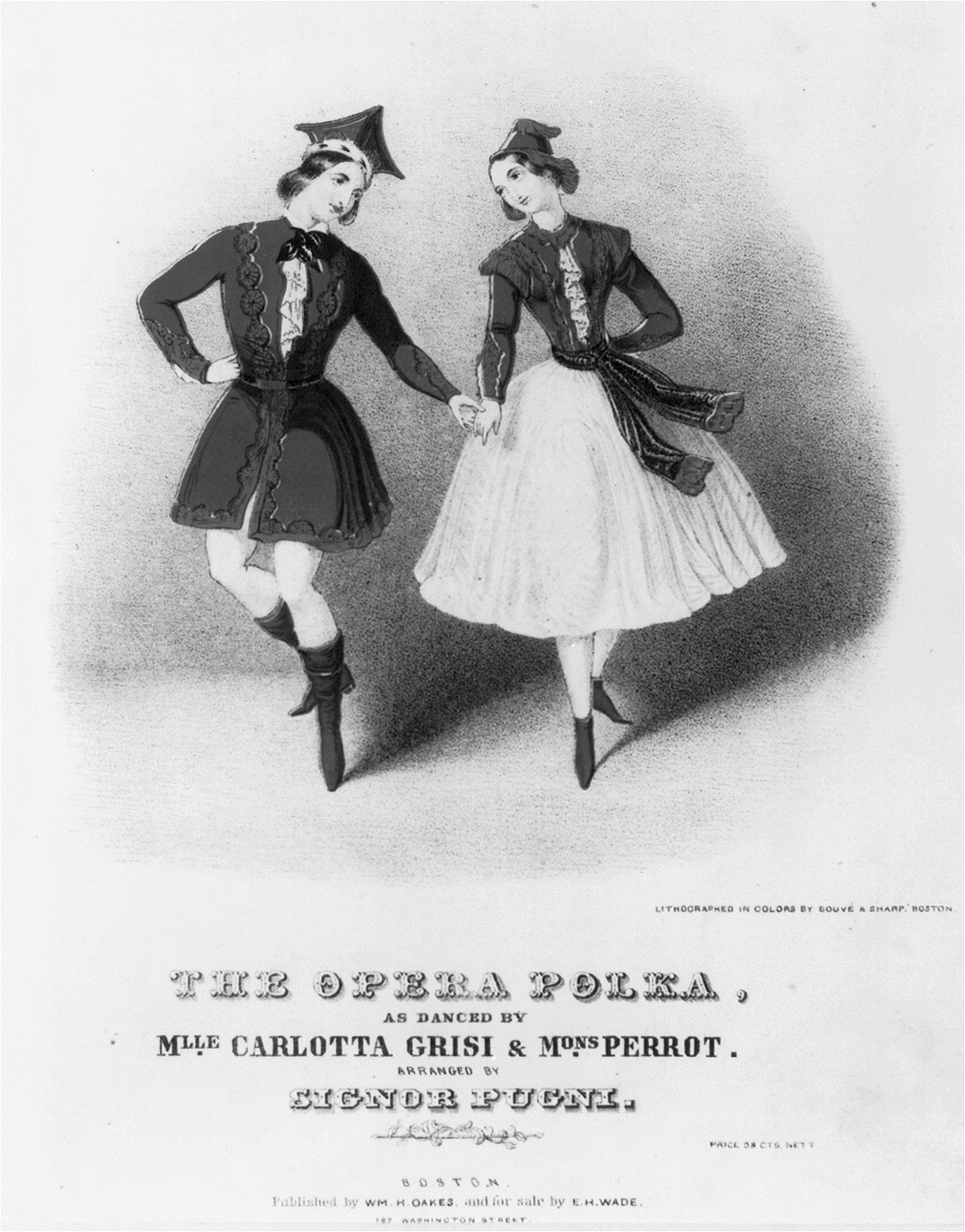
"The Opera Polka as danced by Mlle. Carlotta Grisi & Mons. Perrot" (Boston: William H. Oakes, ca. 1840s)

Following the success of his contributions to the choreography of Giselle, Perrot went on to choreograph Alma ou La Fille du Feu (London 1842) for Fanny Cerrito, which was hailed as a major choreographic success. For the next six years he choreographed regularly at Her Majesty's Theatre in London, including Ondine (1843), La Esmeralda (1844), Le Judgement de Paris (1846), and Pas de Quatre (12 July 1845). For this ballet he not only negotiated the difficult task of persuading the four leading ballerinas of the day to appear on stage together at Her Majesty's Theatre in London. Nearly every ballet Perrot ever created was set to the music of Cesare Pugni.

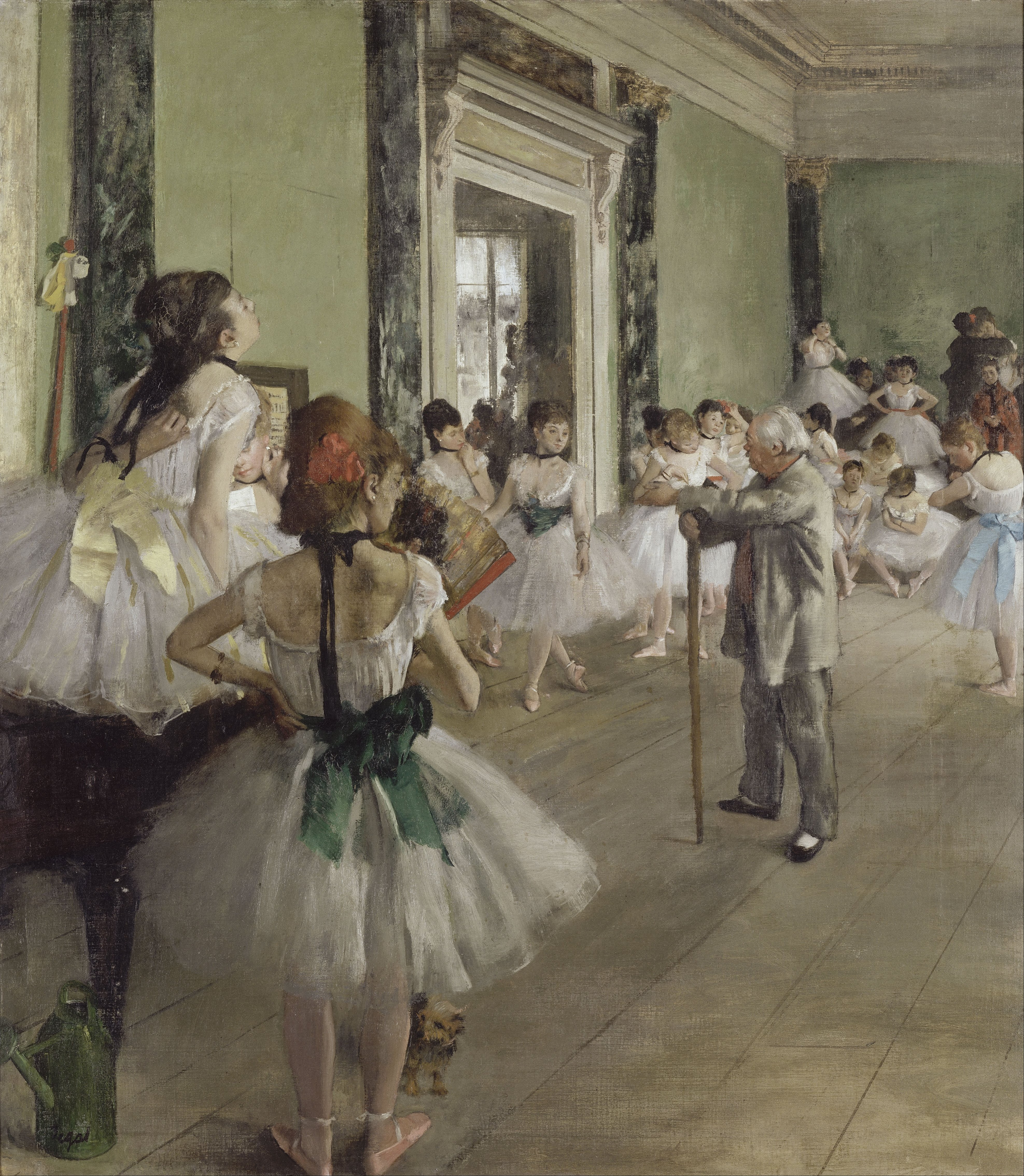
Edgar Degas' painting of Jules Perrot rehearsing dancers in the Foyer de la Danse of the Palais Garnier, 1875

Perrot was engaged as a dancer in St. Petersburg for the Imperial Ballet and later was appointed Balletmaster there. He remained with the Imperial Russian Ballet until 1858. While there, he married Capitoline Samovskaya, a pupil at the Imperial Theater School, with whom he had two children. He returned to Paris to a life of comparative leisure. Perrot died on holiday in Paramé 29 August 1892.

== Ballets ==
Opéra Le Peletier, Paris

- 28 June 1841 – Giselle, music by Adolphe Adam, specially designed for Carlotta Grisi

Her Majesty's Theatre, London

- 9 March 1844 – La Esmeralda, music by Cesare Pugni, leading role by Carlotta Grisi
- 12 July 1845 – Pas de Quatre, music by Cesare Pugni, created for Lucile Grahn, Carlotta Grisi, Fanny Cerrito, and Marie Taglioni

Teatro alla Scala, Milan

- 8 January 1847 – Catarina or La Fille du Bandit (revival), music by Cesare Pugni revised by Giacomo Panizza
- 16 March 1847 – Odette ou la Démence de Charles VI, music by Giacomo Panizza with dances by Giovanni Bajetti and Giovanni Corfu.
- 12 February 1848 – Faust, music by Giacomo Panizza with dances by Giovanni Bajetti

Opéra Le Peletier, Paris

- 8 October 1849 – La Filleule des fées, music by Adolphe Adam. Ballet-féerie in 3 acts, 7 tableaux with prologue and apotheosis (composed jointly with Alfred de Clémenceau de Saint-Julien). Libretto by Jules Perrot and Jules de Saint-Georges.

== See also ==
- Auguste Vestris, Perrot's teacher
- Ballets by Jules Perrot
- List of dancers

== Sources ==
- "Перро, Жюль-Жозеф" . Brockhaus and Efron Encyclopedic Dictionary (in Russian). 1906.
