= Divertissement =

Type of musical composition

Divertissement (from the French 'diversion' or 'amusement') is used, in a similar sense to the Italian 'divertimento', for a light piece of music for a small group of players, however the French term has additional meanings.

During the 17th and 18th century, the term implied incidental aspects of an entertainment (usually involving singing and dancing) that might be inserted in an opera or ballet or other stage performance. In the operas produced by the Académie Royale de Musique, both tragédies lyriques and comédies lyriques, these 'divertissements' were sometimes linked to the main plot, or performed at the close of the performance. (Similar examples during the 19th century include Charles Gounod's opera Faust and Delibes's ballet Coppélia.)

Special entertainments of a similar kind given between the acts of an opera were called 'intermèdes'.

The term is also sometimes used for a suite of loosely connected dances. One 20th-century example is Jacques Ibert's Divertissement (1930). Jean Françaix named four of his compositions Divertissement:

- for string trio and piano (1933)
- for string trio and orchestra (1935)
- for bassoon and string quintet (or orchestra, 1942)
- for oboe, clarinet and bassoon (1945).

== See also ==
- Entr'acte
