= Fanny Cerrito =

Italian ballet dancer and choreographer (1817–1909)

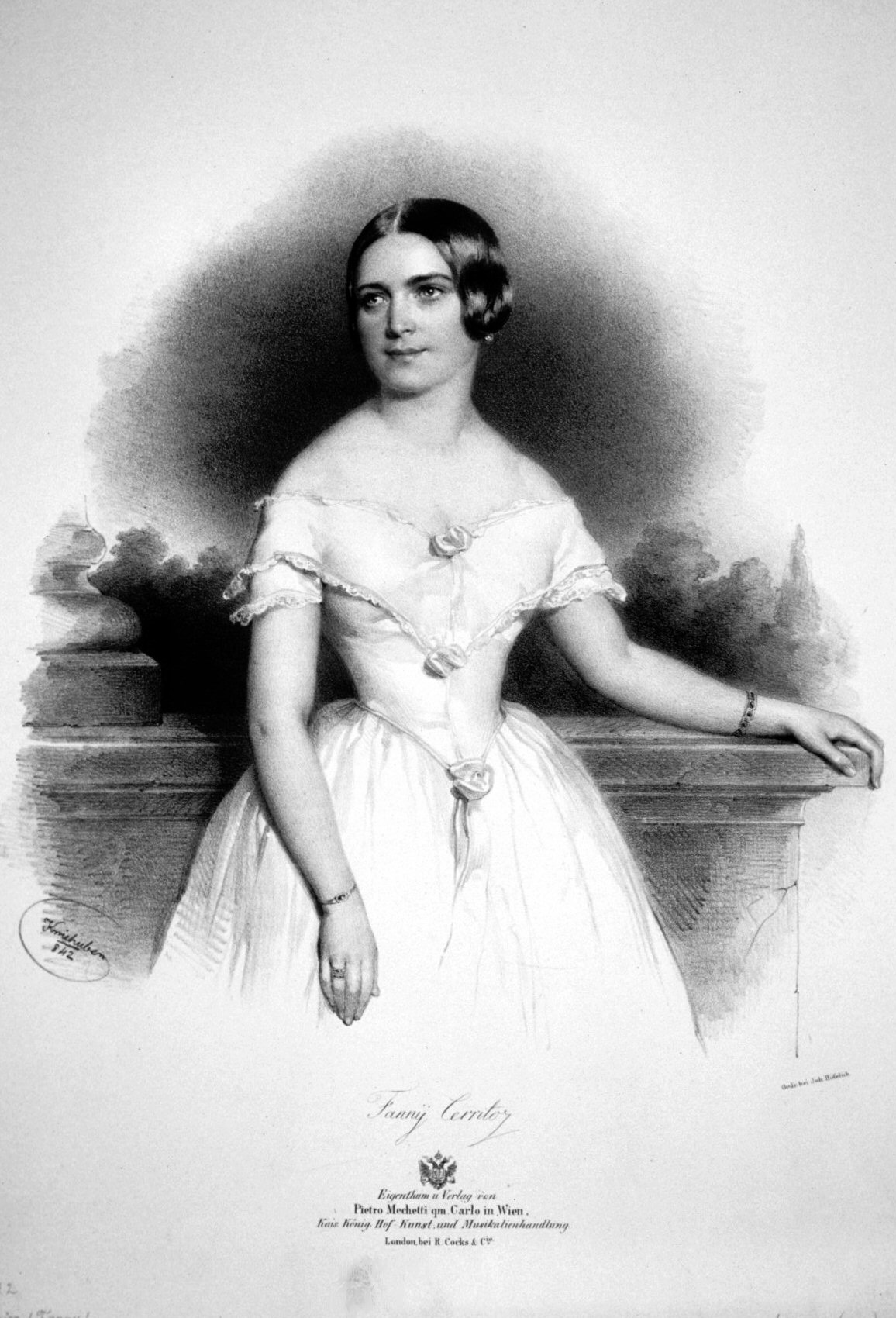
- Fanny Cerrito.
- Born: Francesca Cerrito; 11 May 1817; Naples
- Died: 6 May 1909; Paris
- Occupations: dancer, choreographer

Francesca "Fanny" Cerrito (11 May 1817 – 6 May 1909) was an Italian ballet dancer and choreographer. She was a ballerina noted for the brilliance, strength, and vivacity of her dancing. She was also one of few women in the 19th century to be recognized for her talent as a choreographer.

== Life ==
"The grand Pas des élémens, at Her Majesty's Theatre"; 1847; Fanny Cerrito, Carlotta Grisi & Carolina Galetti Rosati

Born in Naples, Cerrito studied under Carlo Blasis and the French choreographers Jules Perrot and Arthur Saint-Léon, the latter of whom was her husband from 1845 to 1851. She was trained in the ballet school of San Carlo Opera House, later under the supervision of Salvatore Taglioni. Her first stage appearance was in 1832 when she gained recognition almost immediately. In 1836–37 her fame started to spread beyond Italy and she appeared in Vienna to reveal some of her own choreographed works. From 1838 to 1840, she continued to dance with La Scala in Milan, where she gained even more attention. In 1843, Cerrito and Maria Taglioni danced in the same program in Milan; this event caused so much excitement that the city divided itself between the two great rival ballerinas. While in Milan, Fanny began her collaboration with Jules Perrot, during which they choreographed Ondine, ou La naïade (1843) as well as Alma (1842) and Lalla Rookh (1846). Later in 1845, her choreographic talent became recognized after she presented her own ballet, Rosida. For nine seasons, from 1840 to 1848, Cerrito became a very well-respected dancer at Her Majesty's Theatre, London, where the celebrity chef Alexis Soyer created a moulded dessert in her honour that was topped with a miniature figure of the dancer herself, weightlessly poised on a spun sugar zig-zag spiral.

In 1845, Cerrito danced in the Pas de Quatre with Marie Taglioni, Carlotta Grisi and Lucile Grahn. As the least well-known dancer, Grahn agreed to dance first, while Taglioni had been offered the privilege of dancing in coveted last position, by unanimous consent. However neither Grisi nor Cerrito would agree to dance before the other. It required great diplomacy on the part of Benjamin Lumley, the opera manager, to arrange the order of the middle two solos, and when he proclaimed that the elder of the two should go last, Cerrito was reluctant to claim her 'prize'.

== See also ==
- Luigi Astolfi
- Women in dance
