= Ludwig Minkus =

Austrian composer (1826–1917)

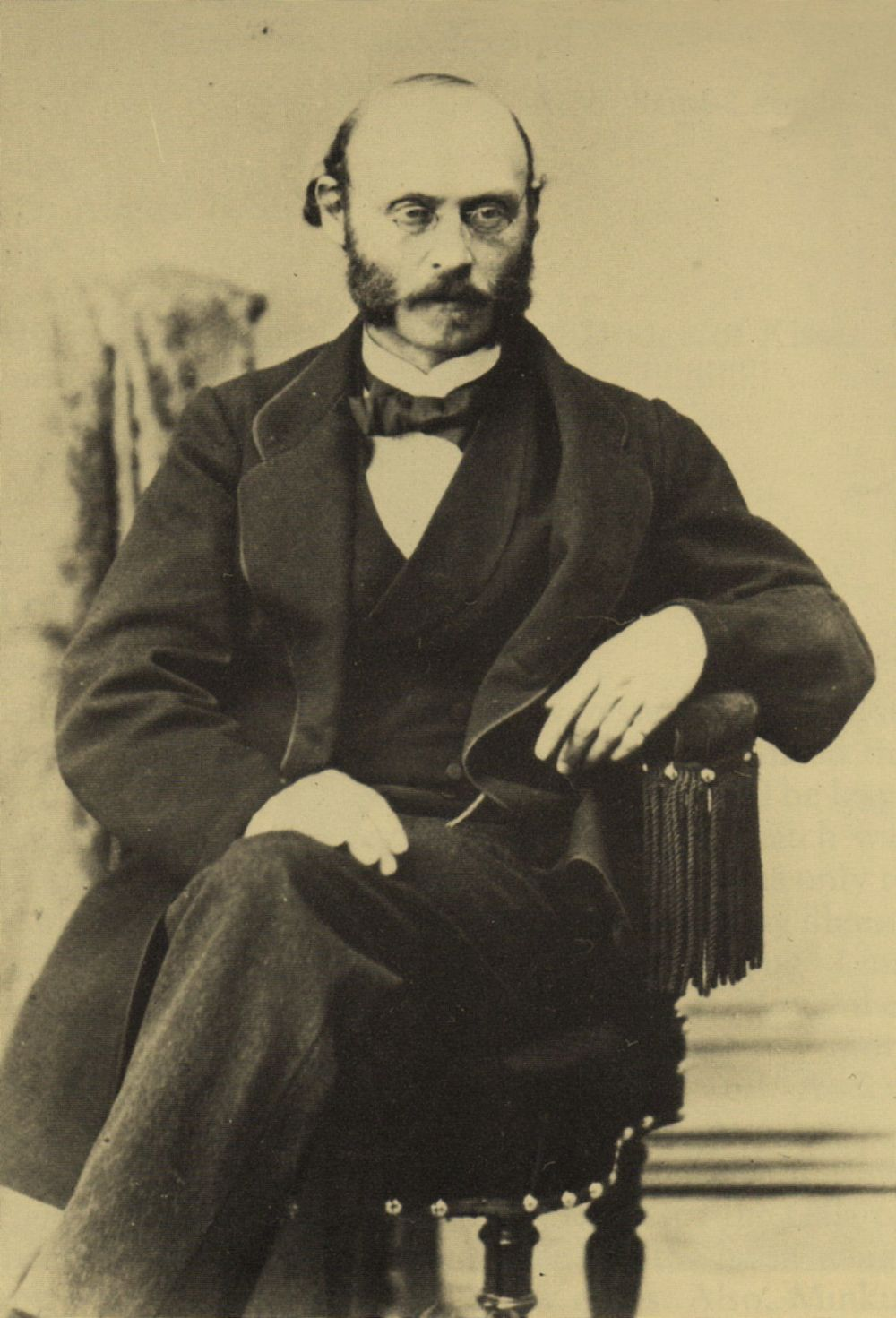
- Maestro Ludwig Minkus, photographed by Bruno Braquehais. Paris, c. 1870.
- Born: Aloysius Bernhard Philipp Minkus; 23 March 1826; Vienna, Austrian Empire
- Died: 7 December 1917 (aged 91); Vienna, Austria-Hungary
- Occupations: Composer; violinist; teacher

Ludwig Minkus (Russian: Людвиг Минкус, romanized: Lyudvig Minkus), also known as Léon Fyodorovich Minkus (23 March 1826 – 7 December 1917), was an Austrian composer of ballet music, a violinist and teacher of music.

Minkus is noted for the music he composed during his career in St. Petersburg, Russia. Beginning in 1871 Minkus served in the official post of Composer of Ballet Music to the St. Petersburg Imperial Theatres, a position he held until it was abolished upon his retirement in 1886. During his long career in St. Petersburg, Minkus composed for the original works and revivals staged by the ballet masters Arthur Saint-Léon and Marius Petipa. Among the composer's most celebrated compositions is his score for La source (1866; composed jointly with Léo Delibes), Don Quixote (1869); and La Bayadère (1877). Minkus composed many pieces for older works. The most well-known of Minkus's additional music is the Grand Pas classique and Mazurka des enfants composed for Petipa's 1881 revival of Paquita.

== Early life ==
Ludwig Minkus was born Aloysius Bernhard Philipp Minkus on 23 March 1826, in the Innere Stadt district of Vienna, the capital of the Austrian Empire. His father, Theodor Johann Minkus, was born in 1795 in Groß-Meseritsch, Moravia (today known as Velké Meziříčí near Brno, Moravia, in what is now the Czech Republic) and his mother, Maria Franziska Heimann was born in 1807 in Pest, Hungary. Minkus was of Jewish descent—his parents converted to Catholicism not long before their relocation to Vienna, and were married on the following day.

Minkus's father was a wholesale merchant of wine in Moravia, Austria and Hungary. Theodore Minkus eventually opened a restaurant in the Innere Stadt district of Vienna that featured its own Tanzkapelle (dance orchestra), one of many such orchestras in the imperial capital at that time. By the age of four, Ludwig Minkus began to receive private lessons in the violin, and from 1838 to 1842 he began his musical studies at the Gesellschaft der Musikfreunde in Vienna.

Minkus made his public début at a recital in Vienna at the age of eight. On 18 October 1845 an announcement in the Viennese newspaper Der Humorist commented on the performances of the previous season, and noted that Minkus's playing featured " ... a conservative style with a glittering performance." Soon the young Minkus was appearing in various concert halls as a soloist of note.

Minkus began composing for his instrument while he was still a student. Five pieces for the violin were published in 1846. At this time Minkus began to try his hand at conducting. For a time he was the regular conductor of an orchestra that competed with another under the baton of the young Johann Strauss II (in later years Strauss was acquainted with Minkus's brother Eugen, a bank director in Vienna).

Minkus's life from 1842 to 1852 is poorly documented—travel applications survive which show requests to visit Germany, France and England. In 1852 Minkus accepted the position of principal violinist to the Vienna Court Opera, but because this meant that he also had to fulfill the usual duties this position demanded, he resigned that same year to take up an important musical assignment abroad that would change his life forever.

== Russia ==
In 1853 Ludwig Minkus emigrated to Saint Petersburg, Russia to serve as conductor of the Serf orchestra of Prince Nikolai Yusupov, a post which Minkus occupied until 1855. That same year, Minkus married Maria Antoinette Schwarz at the Catholic Church of St. Catherine in St. Petersburg. Schwarz was also a native of Austria, born in Vienna in 1838.

From 1856 until 1861 Minkus served as principal violinist and concert master to the orchestra of the Imperial Bolshoi Theatre of Moscow as well as conductor of the Italian Opera of that theatre. By 1861 Minkus was promoted to the prestigious position of Inspector of Orchestras to the Moscow Imperial Theatres. At this time Minkus was also working as professor of violin at the newly established Moscow Conservatory.

It was for the private performances at the Yusupov palace that Minkus composed what appears to be his first score for ballet, the mythological L′Union de Thétis et Pélée (The Union of Thetis and Peleus), first performed in 1857. During his association with the Imperial Bolshoi Theatre in Moscow, Minkus composed another score for ballet, the one-act Deux jours en Venise (Two Days in Venice), produced in 1862.

=== Collaborations with Arthur Saint-Léon ===
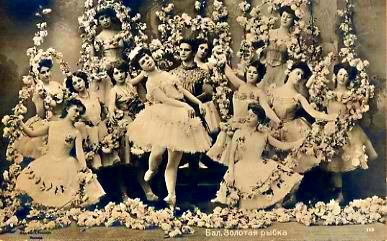
Ekaterina Geltzer and Vassily Tikhomirov (center) with corps de ballet in Alexander Gorsky's revival of Minkus's Le Poisson doré for the Bolshoi Theatre; Moscow, 1903.

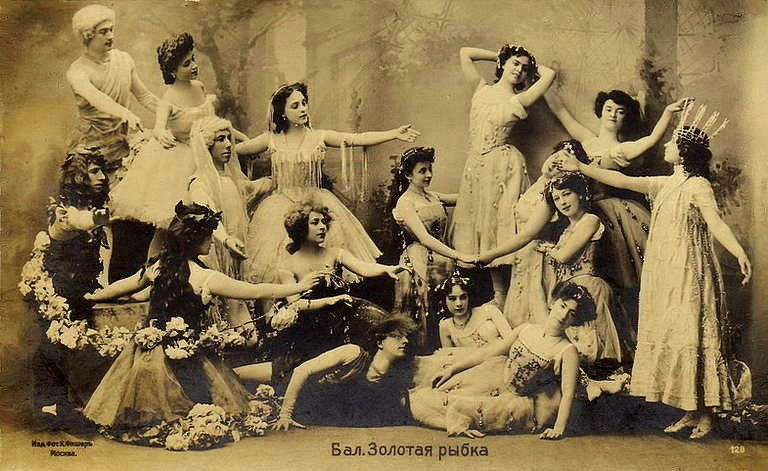
Soloists and corps de ballet in Alexander Gorsky's revival of Minkus's Le Poisson doré for the Bolshoi Theatre; Moscow, 1903.

In 1862 Minkus was commissioned to compose an entr'acte for solo violin to be added to Adolphe Adam's score for Jean Coralli's ballet Orfa, which was staged for the Bolshoi Theatre of Moscow by Arthur Saint-Léon. Since 1860 Saint-Léon was engaged as Premier Maître de Ballet of the St. Petersburg Imperial Theatres, a position which also required him to stage the occasional work for the Moscow ballet troupe.

It was Saint-Léon who commissioned Minkus's first score for a full-length Grand Ballet. This was the three-act La Flamme d′amour, ou La Salamandre (The Flame of Love, or The Salamander), produced for the Imperial Bolshoi Theatre of Moscow. The ballet was first presented for the benefit performance of the Russian prima ballerina Marfa Muravieva on 24 November [O.S. 12 November] 1863. Saint-Léon then mounted the ballet in an expanded edition for the Imperial Ballet of St. Petersburg under the title Fiametta, ou L′amour du Diable (Fiametta, or The Love of the Devil. The first performance at the Imperial Bolshoi Kamenny Theatre on 25 February [O.S. 13 February] 1864 was also a benefit performance for Muravieva. Minkus later accompanied Saint-Léon to Paris to mount the ballet at the Théâtre Impérial de l'Opéra in Paris, again as a vehicle for Muravieva. For this staging the ballet's title was changed again as Néméa, ou L′Amour vengé (Néméa, or The Avenged Love). Since ballets at that time were only performed at the Paris Opéra as diversions during the intermissions of full-length operas, Saint-Léon was required to mount the ballet in a redacted edition in two-acts. The first performance took place on 11 July 1864 with an audience that included the Empress Eugénie. The cast included the celebrated Premier danseur and choreographer Louis Mérante in the role of Count Molder and the ballerina Eugénie Fiocre in the role of Cupid. Minkus's score was praised by Parisian critics, among them Théophile Gautier, who found the music to be filled with a " .. haunting, dreamy quality. The music for the dances were filled with sparkling melodies and infectious rhythms." Néméa, ou L′Amour vengé was retained for fifty-three performances in the Opéra's repertory until 1871. Saint-Léon also mounted the work for the ballet troupe of the Teatro Comunale in Trieste, where it premiered on 15 March 1868 as Nascita della Fiamma d′Amore (Birth of the Flame of Love). The change of titles of this ballet has caused much confusion among historians.

In the fall of 1866 Saint-Léon was invited to stage a new work for the Théâtre Impérial de l'Opéra. This was La Source, which was written by Minkus in collaboration with the composer Léo Delibes. Minkus wrote the whole of Act I and the second tableau of Act III, while Delibes wrote the whole of Act II and the first tableau of Act III. Contemporary sources do not offer an explanation as to why the score was shared between the two composers. La Source premiered on 12 November 1866, and was retained until 1876 after seventy-three performances in the repertoire of the Paris Opéra.

Saint-Léon continued to work with Minkus throughout the 1860s. On 1 December [O.S. 19 November] 1866 Saint-Léon presented his one-act ballet Le Poisson doré (The Golden Fish), which was staged at Peterhof in honor of the wedding of the Tsarevich Alexander Alexandrovich to the Princess Dagmar of Denmark. Saint-Léon chose a Russian subject for this work, derived from Alexander Pushkin's 1835 poem Skazka o rybake i rybke (The Tale of the Fisherman and the Fish). For the Imperial Ballet's 1867–1868 season, Saint-Léon expanded Le Poisson doré into a three-act Grand ballet, first presented on 20 November [O.S. 8 November] 1867 with the celebrated Italian ballerina Guglielmina Salvioni in the principal role of Galia. Minkus's score featured several traditional Russian folk melodies, as well as virtuoso passages for solo flute written especially for the renowned Italian flautist Cesare Ciardi.

The following season Minkus and Saint-Léon produced the ballet Le Lys (The Lily), based on a Chinese legend Three Arrows. The ballet was first presented at the Imperial Bolshoi Kamenny Theatre on 2 November [O.S. 21 October] 1869 for the benefit performance of the ballerina Adèle Grantzow. In spite of his efforts, both Le Lys and the expanded Le Poisson doré proved to be failures for Saint-Léon. In light of this the directorate of the St. Petersburg Imperial Theatres did not renew the Ballet Master's contract, and soon he re-located to Paris where he died in 1870.

=== Collaborations with Marius Petipa ===
Through his association with Saint-Léon and the St. Petersburg Imperial Ballet, Minkus came to the attention of the renowned choreographer Marius Petipa. Petipa arrived in the imperial capital in 1847, where he was engaged as Premier danseur to the Imperial Theatres, as well as assistant to the Ballet Master Jules Perrot, who served as Premier Maître de Ballet to the company from 1850 to 1859. Petipa was named second Maître de Ballet after the success of his grand ballet The Pharaoh's Daughter, set to the score of the Italian composer Cesare Pugni. Pugni had served as Ballet Composer of the St. Petersburg Imperial Theatres since 1850, a post which was created especially for him when he accompanied Perrot to Russia that same year. By the mid-1860s the composer was nearing the end of his life and prolific career. As the decade drew to a close he became increasingly unreliable, and so Saint-Léon and Petipa began to turn to Minkus.

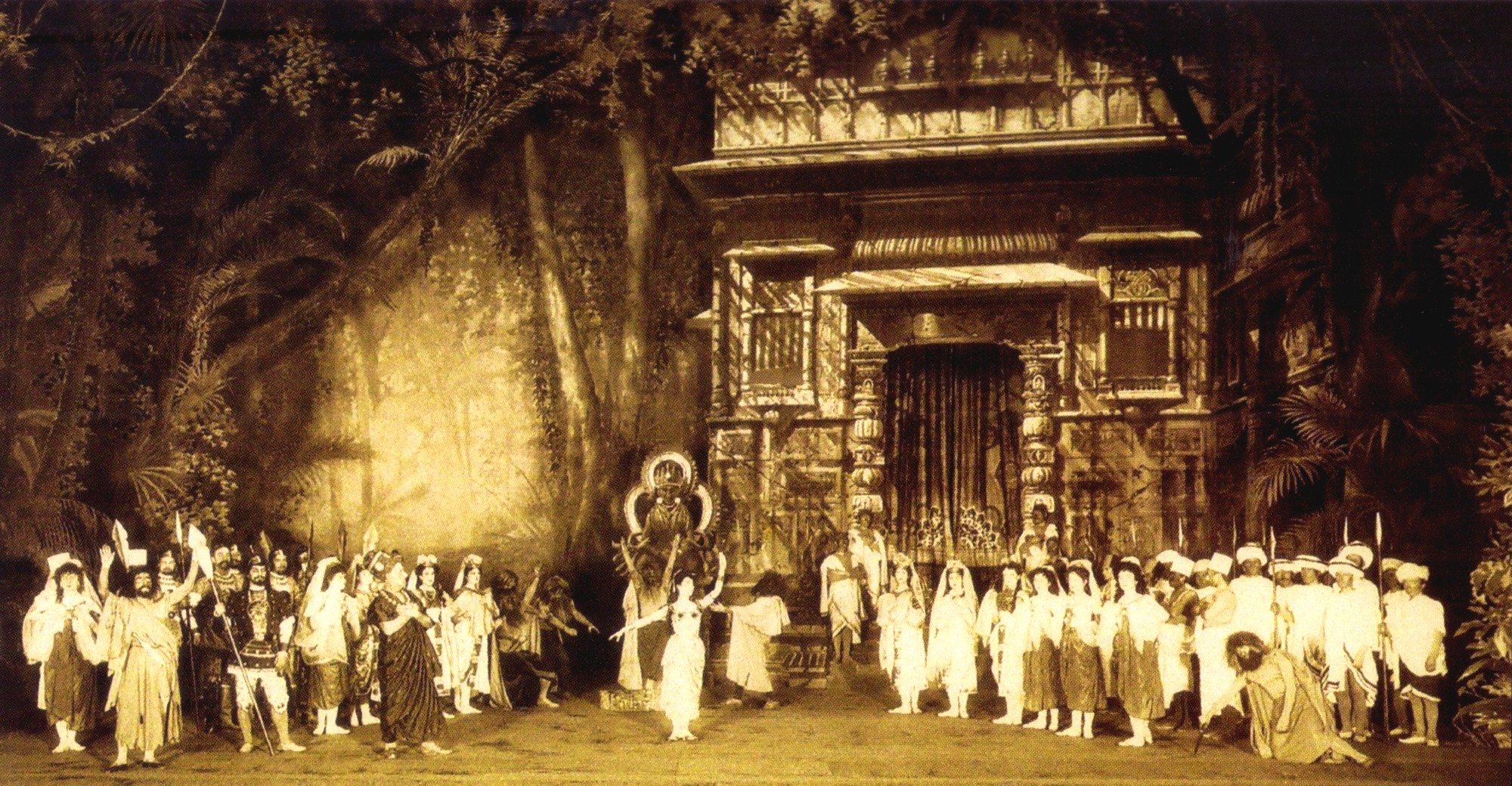
Act I/scene 1 of La Bayadère. In the center is Mathilde Kschessinskaya as Nikiya. St. Petersburg, 1900.

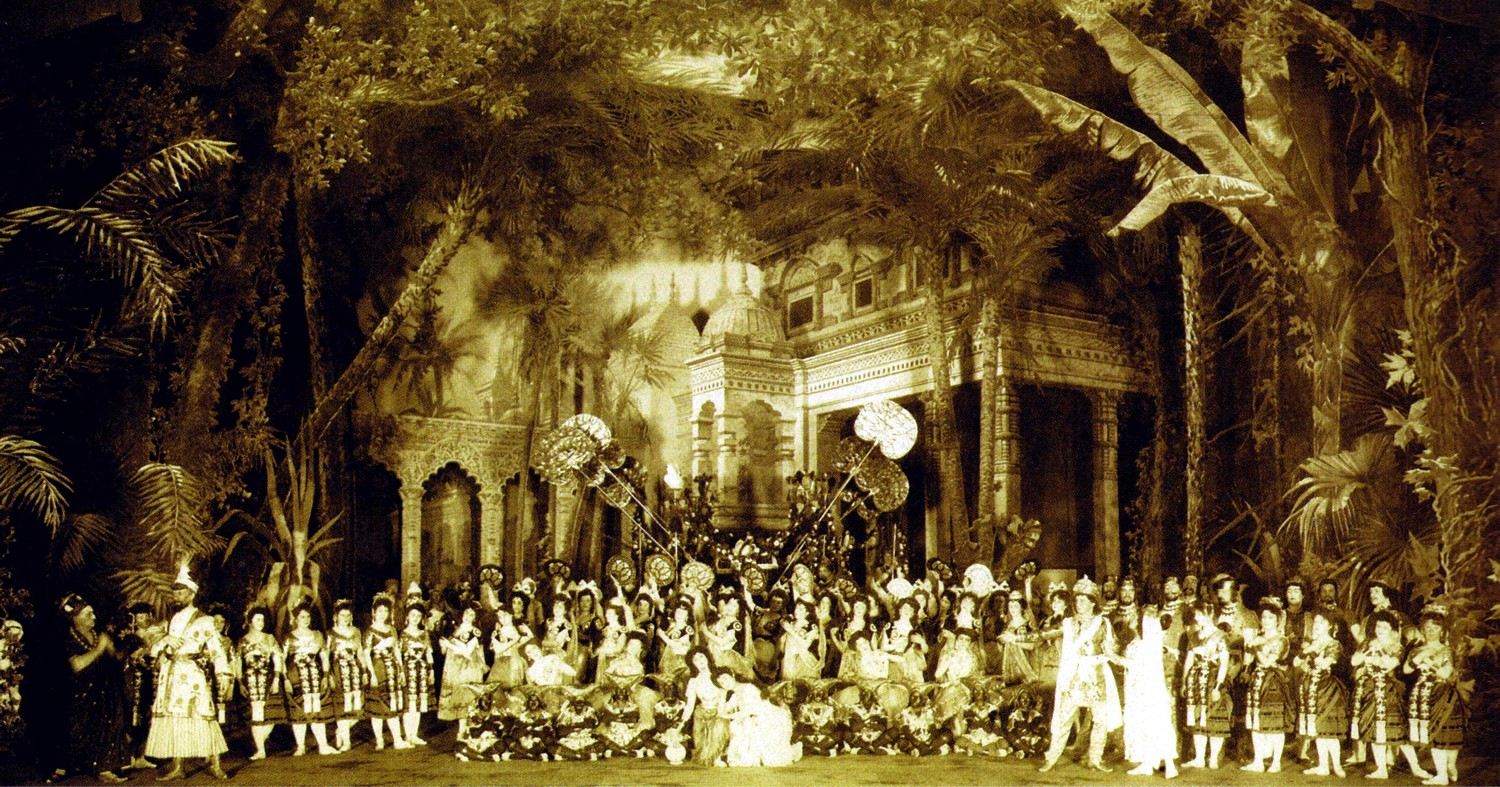
Act II of La Bayadère. In the center is Mathilde Kschessinskaya as Nikiya (right) kneeling with Vera Trefilova (left) who performed the Danse manu. Standing toward the right is Pavel Gerdt as Solor with Olga Preobrajenskaya as Gamzatti. St. Petersburg, 1900.

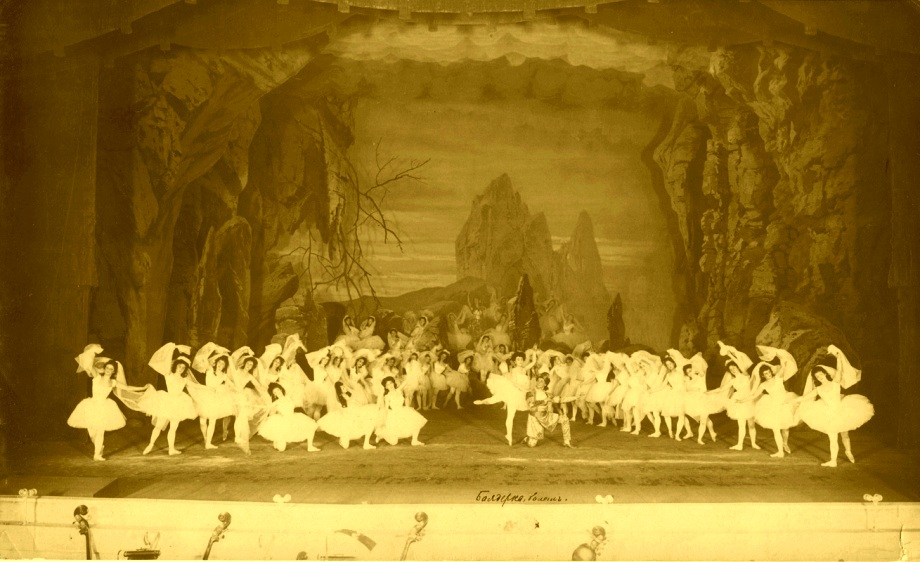
Act III of La Bayadère, the scene The Kingdom of the Shades. In the center is Mathilde Kschessinskaya as Nikiya with Pavel Gerdt as Solor. Kneeling toward the left is Varvara Rhykhliakova, Anna Pavlova, and Julia Sedova as the three soloist shades. St. Petersburg, 1900.

For the Moscow Imperial Bolshoi Theatre's 1869–1870 season, Petipa staged a Grand ballet based on Miguel de Cervantes' early 17th century novel Don Quixote. Although plans were made to have a score supplied by Pugni, Petipa instead turned to Minkus, who supplied a score filled with a great variety of Spanish-styled flair. Petipa's Don Quixote premiered to a resounding success on 26 December [O.S. 14 December] 1869, and went on to become a celebrated work in the classical ballet repertory.

Not long before Saint-Léon's death, Petipa was named Premier Maître de Ballet of the St. Petersburg Imperial Theatres. Petipa staged a new version of his Don Quixote for the Imperial Ballet in St. Petersburg, and for this production Minkus completely reworked and expanded his score. This staging of Don Quixote premiered on 21 November [O.S. 9 November] 1871 to great success, earning Minkus great acclaim for his effective music. With the death of Cesare Pugni in January 1870 the official post of ballet composer was left vacant. With the success of his score for Petipa's Don Quixote, Minkus was named Ballet Composer of the St. Petersburg Imperial Theatres, which marked the beginning of a long and productive collaboration between him and Petipa. They would go on to produce La Camargo in 1872, Le Papillon in 1874, Les Brigands (The Bandits) in 1875, Le Songe d'une nuit d'été (A Midsummer Night's Dream) and Les Aventures de Pélée (The Adventures of Peleus) in 1876, and finally La Bayadère in 1877, which would go on to be the most enduring and well preserved work for which Minkus composed the music.

During this time, Minkus continued playing violin in professional capacities. For example, he was the second violin in the ensemble that premiered Tchaikovsky's String Quartet No. 1 in D, Op. 11, in Moscow on 28 March 1871. Minkus's scores featured violin cadenzas written especially for the great Leopold Auer.

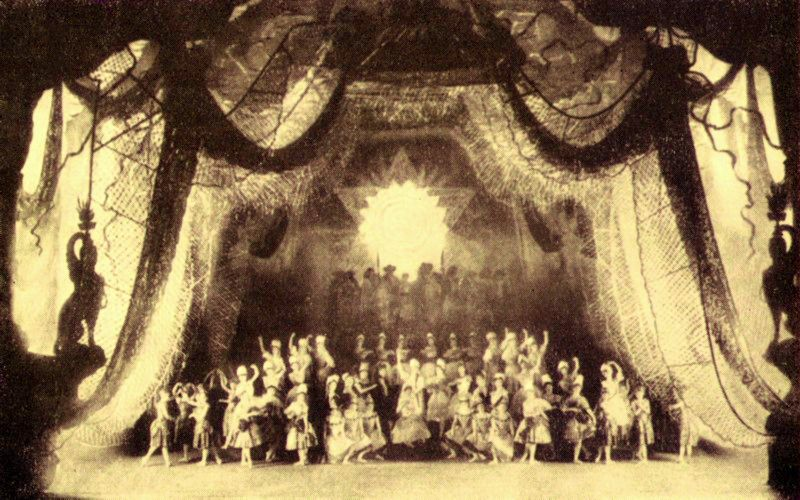
Scene from Les Pilules magiques. St. Petersburg, 1886.

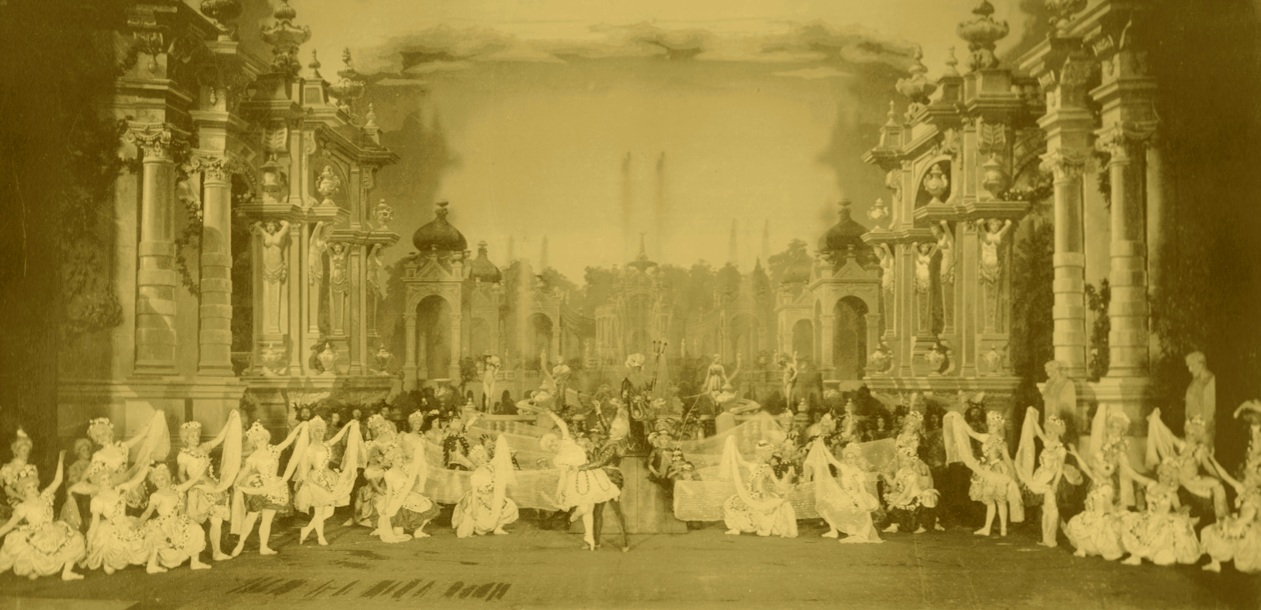
Act III of La Camargo. In the center is Pierina Legnani in the title role with Nikolai Legat as Vestris. St. Petersburg, 1901.

In 1883 Minkus composed the music for Petipa's Nuit et Jour, a sumptuous pièce d'occasion staged especially for the celebrations held at the Imperial Bolshoi Theatre of Moscow in honor of the coronation of Emperor Alexander III. The Emperor, a fanatic balletomane, bestowed upon Minkus the Order of Saint Stanislaus for his score. During the ceremony the newly crowned Emperor told Minkus " ... you have reached perfection as a ballet composer."

Petipa's Les Pilules magiques (The Magic Pills), which premiered 21 February [O.S. 9 February] 1886 was a grand work staged for the inauguration of the newly renovated Imperial Mariinsky Theatre, which was now the Imperial Ballet and Opera's principal venue. Les Pilules magiques was in the tradition of vaudeville, and aside from Petipa's danced episodes included comedy and singing. Minkus naturally supplied the music for Petipa's danced passages in three fantastical tableaux. The first took place in a cave inhabited by sorceresses, while the second included various card games brought to life through dance. The third and final tableau was known as The Kingdom of the Laces in which a Grand divertissement of national dances from Belgium, England, Spain and Russia was performed.

Minkus's next score was for Petipa's one-act ballet L'Offrandes à l'Amour, staged especially for the benefit performance of the ballerina Eugenia Sokolova on 3 August [O.S. 22 July] 1886. Minkus's music was hailed as a masterwork of ballet music by contemporary critics. It would be his last known ballet score for Petipa.

== Retirement ==
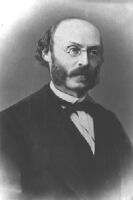
Minkus, St. Petersburg, circa 1880

By 1886 Minkus's contract with the St. Petersburg Imperial Theatres was set to expire. In light of this, the director of the Imperial Theatres Ivan Vsevolozhsky felt that the time had come for Minkus's post of official ballet composer to be abolished in an effort to diversify the music supplied for new works. Minkus officially retired on 21 November [O.S. 9 November] 1886 with his benefit performance that featured excerpts from Les pilules magiques and the Grand pas classique from Paquita.

In spite of his retirement, Minkus was asked to return to ballet composition for a new ballet one final time in 1890 for Petipa's ballet Kalkabrino, set to a libretto by Modest Tchaikovsky. This work premiered on 25 February [O.S. 13 February] 1891 for the benefit performance of the Italian ballerina Carlotta Brianza. Though not a success, the ballet was acquired by the young Mathilde Kschessinskaya upon the departure of Carlotta Brianza in late 1891, who used it to launch her own career.

== Departure from Russia and later life ==
Minkus and his wife Maria left Russia forever in the summer of 1891, relocating to their native Vienna. The composer lived in semi-retirement on a modest pension from the Tsar's treasury. For a time he lived in the Karl Ludwig Strasse on the third floor of a rented apartment belonging to his friend, the revered pianist and teacher Theodor Leschetizky. These years saw Minkus's last known compositions: Das Maskenfest (The Masked Festival) was originally written by the composer as Tanz und Mythe (Dance and Myth) in 1897 for the ballet of the Kaiserliches und Königliches Hof-Operntheater (a.k.a. the Vienna Court Opera). The ballet was rejected outright by the Operntheater's directorate Gustav Mahler, who felt that the work's libretto was out of touch with contemporary tastes. Minkus then composed Die Dryaden (The Dryads) for the Viennese stage in 1899, a ballet in one act. The final work associated with Minkus's name before his death was Rübezahl, staged in 1907 at the Court Opera to a pastiche of airs taken from his and Delibes's La Source and the works of Johann Strauss II.

Minkus later relocated to an apartment in the Gentzgasse where he spent his final years alone and in utter poverty, his wife having died in 1895, and the events of World War I having cut off his pension from Russia. During the extremely cold winter of 1917, Minkus developed pneumonia and died on 7 December 1917 at the age of ninety-one. With no children of his own, Minkus was survived only by a niece, Clara von Minkus.

Ludwig Minkus was interred at the Döbling Cemetery in Vienna.

For some time, it was reported that, in 1939, after the Nazi invasion of Austria, Minkus's grave was one of many that fell victim to the national socialist policies of the time that demanded for all cemeteries to be systematically "cleansed" by the invading Nazi regime. The graves of those who were considered ethnically "undesirable", especially if one was of Jewish descent or without any documented subscriber to the annual cemetery fees, were exhumed and deposited into a mass anonymous grave. However, this was not the case. Records held at the Döbling Cemetery confirm that Minkus's grave was never disturbed or destroyed and before the war, the name on the initial stone was changed to save the grave. Other people have since been buried in the same plot, but Minkus stayed in his resting place.

== Ballets ==
=== Imperial Bolshoi Kamenny Theatre, St. Petersburg ===
- Fiametta, ou L′amour du Diable (new staging of La Flamme d′amour, ou La Salamandre). Choreography by A. Saint-Léon. 25 February [O.S. 13 February] 1864.
- Le Poisson doré (expanded staging in three acts). Choreography by A. Saint-Léon. 20 November [O.S. 8 November] 1867.
- Le Lys. Choreography by A. Saint-Léon. 2 November [O.S. 21 October] 1869.
- La Camargo. Choreography by M. Petipa. 29 December [O.S. 17 December] 1872.
- Le Papillon. Choreography by M. Petipa. 19 January [O.S. 7 January] 1874.
- Les Brigands. Choreography by M. Petipa. 6 February [O.S. 25 January] 1875.
- Les Aventures de Pélée. Choreography by M. Petipa. 30 January [O.S. 18 January] 1876.
- Le Songe d'une nuit d'été. Based on Felix Mendelssohn's music. Choreography by M. Petipa. 26 July [O.S. 14 July] 1876.
- La Bayadère. Choreography by M. Petipa. 4 February [O.S. 23 January] 1877.
- Roxana, la beauté du Monténégro. Choreography by M. Petipa. 10 February [O.S. 29 January] 1878.
- La Fille des Neiges. Choreography by M. Petipa. 19 January [O.S. 7 January] 1879.
- Mlada. Choreography by M. Petipa. 14 December [O.S. 2 December] 1879.
- Zoraïa, ou La Maure en Espagne. Choreography by M. Petipa. 13 February [O.S. 1 February] 1881.

=== Imperial Bolshoi Theatre, Moscow ===
- Deux jours en Venise. Choreography by ?. 1862.
- La Flamme d′amour, ou La Salamandre. Choreography by A. Saint-Léon. 24 November [O.S. 12 November] 1863.
- Don Quixote (Original staging in 3 acts/8 tableaux). Choreography by M. Petipa. 26 December [O.S. 14 December] 1869.
- Nuit et Jour. Choreography by M. Petipa. 30 May [O.S. 18 May] 1883.

=== Works for other venues ===
- L′Union de Thétis et Pélée. Choreography by ?. 1857. Private Theatre of the Yusupov Palace, St. Petersburg.
- Néméa, ou L′Amour vengé (Reduced staging in two acts of Fiametta, ou L′amour du Diable). Choreography by A. Saint-Léon. 11 July 1864. Théâtre Impérial de l'Opéra, Paris.
- La Source (composed jointly with Léo Delibes). Choreography by A. Saint-Léon. 12 November 1866. Théâtre Impérial de l'Opéra, Paris.
- Le Poisson doré (Original staging in one act). Choreography by A. Saint-Léon. 1 December [O.S. 19 November] 1866. Amphitheatre of Olga's Island at Peterhof Palace, St. Petersburg.
- Les Pilules magiques. Choreography by M. Petipa. 21 February [O.S. 9 February] 1886. Imperial Mariinsky Theatre, St. Petersburg.
- L'Offrandes à l'Amour. Choreography by M. Petipa. 3 August [O.S. 22 July] 1886. Peterhof, St. Petersburg.

== Sources ==
- "Минкус, Людвиг" . Brockhaus and Efron Encyclopedic Dictionary (in Russian). 1906.
- Anderson, Keith. CD Liner notes. Léon Minkus. Don Quixote. Nayden Todorov Cond. Sofia National Opera Orchestra. Naxos 8.557065/66.
- Guest, Ivor. CD Liner notes. Adolphe Adam. Giselle. Richard Bonynge Cond. Orchestra of the Royal Opera House, Covent Garden. Decca 417 505–2.
- Guest, Ivor. CD Liner notes. Léon Minkus & Léo Delibes. La Source. Richard Bonynge Cond. Orchestra of the Royal Opera House, Covent Garden. Decca 421 431–2.
- Kirov/Mariinsky Ballet. Program from La Bayadère. Mariinsky Theatre, 2001.
- Petipa, Marius. "The Diaries of Marius Petipa", translated and edited by Lynn Garafola. Studies in Dance History 3.1 (Spring 1992)
- Royal Ballet. Program from La Bayadère. Royal Opera House, 1990.
- Stegemann, Michael. CD Liner notes, translated by Lionel Salter. Léon Minkus. Don Quijote. Boris Spassov, cond. Sofia National Opera Orchestra. Capriccio 10 540/41.
- Stegemann, Michael. CD Liner notes. Trans. Lionel Salter. Léon Minkus. Paquita & La Bavadere. Boris Spassov Cond. Sofia National Opera Orchestra. Capriccio 10 544.
- Warrack, John. Tchaikovsky. New York: C. Scribner's Sons, 1973. ISBN 0-684-13558-2
- Wiley, Roland John. "Dances from Russia: An Introduction to the Sergeyev Collection". The Harvard Library Bulletin, 24.1 January 1976.
- Wiley, Roland John, ed. and translator. A Century of Russian Ballet: Documents and Accounts, 1810–1910. Oxford: Clarendon Press; New York: Oxford University Press, 1990. ISBN 0-19-316416-7
- Wiley, Roland John. Tchaikovsky's Ballets: Swan Lake, Sleeping Beauty, Nutcracker. Oxford: Clarendon Press; New York: Oxford University Press, 1985. ISBN 0-19-315314-9
