= The Magic Pills =

1886 ballet by Marius Petipa

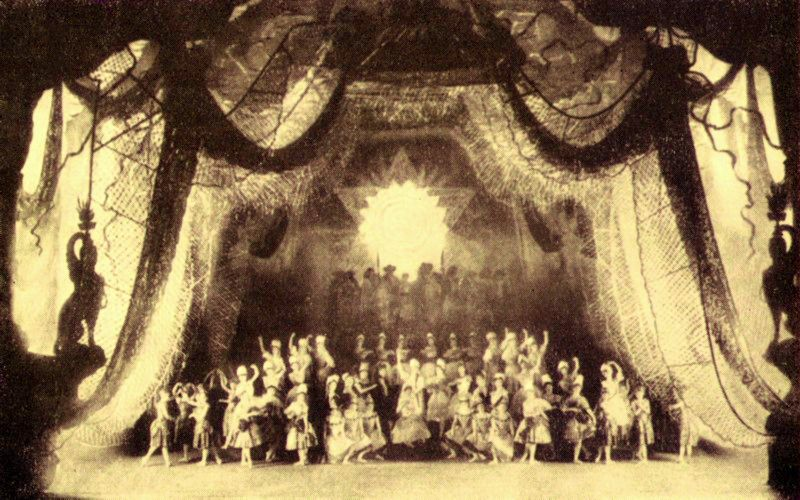
- The Magic Pills (1886)
- Choreographer: Marius Petipa
- Music: Ludwig Minkus
- Premiere: 21 February [O.S. 9 February] 1886; St. Petersburg
- Original ballet company: Imperial Ballet
- Created for: premiere of Imperial Mariinsky Theatre
- Genre: ballet-féerie

The Magic Pills (Les Pilules magiques) is a ballet-féerie with three acts and thirteen scenes. The choreography is by Marius Petipa, and the music is by Ludwig Minkus.

The ballet was first presented by the Imperial Ballet on February 21, 1886, at the Imperial Mariinsky Theatre in St. Petersburg, Russia. The ballet was presented in honor of the inauguration of the Mariinsky Theatre as the Imperial Ballet and Opera's principal venue in 1886 and was the first ballet performed in the theatre. Principal dancer Varvara Nikitina performed the leading role.

== History ==
After the Imperial Mariinsky Theatre became the new permanent residence of the Imperial Ballet, The Magic Pills was the first ballet to be performed in honor of the dedication. The Magic Pills was also one of the first full-length ballets féerie to be performed in Russia, though Petipa had been commissioned to create multiple such productions by Ivan Vsevolozhsky, who had a keen interest in the modern ballet culture and was fascinated by the purely theatrical elegance that was characteristic of the ballet féerie.

The ballet féerie genre was characterized by its fantasy elements and spectacular visuals, mostly lacking any dramatic content or thematic depth. Ballet féerie had increased in popularity across Europe throughout the 1880s thanks to its escapist qualities and outlandish showmanship. The success of Luigi Manzotti and Romualdo Marenco's premiere of Excelsior at the Teatro alla Scala in Milan in 1881, followed by equally successful premieres in London and St. Petersberg, prompted other such spectacles as Round the World in Eighty Days and Voyage à la Lune, in which Virginia Zucchi made her debut in Saint Petersburg in 1885.

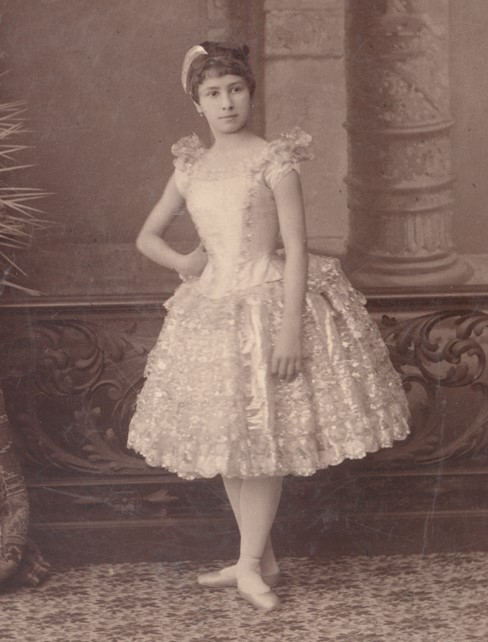
Mathilde Kschessinska in the Dance of the Silver Lace

Petipa, however, held no such admiration for the ballet féerie, detesting the lack of artistic merit and the emphasis on modern pageantry in Excelsior. Still, he wrote several ballets féerie at the request of Vsevolozhsky, including The Magic Pills, and to fulfill the demands of the public and the officials. Petipa’s ballet féerie was noticeably less theatrical and borrowed elements from other sources by adding his own signature touch to make them suitable for ballet. Despite his distaste for the genre, Petipa’s subsequent work, such as Le Roi Candaule, was influenced by the ballet féerie and utilized rearrangements of grand-scale ensemble scenes in his newer productions.

The Magic Pills premiered at the Imperial Mariinsky Theatre on February 21, 1886, and marked the first ballet performance in the new theatre. The plot of the ballet was sparse and created purely as a vehicle for displaying entertaining sets of dances. Each act and scene represented a game or toy, with the most extravagant act being the third and final Kingdom of the Laces sequence. The ballet also contained elements of vaudeville and included some episodes with singing and comedy. The Magic Pills was a huge critical and commercial success in St. Petersburg.

== Original cast ==
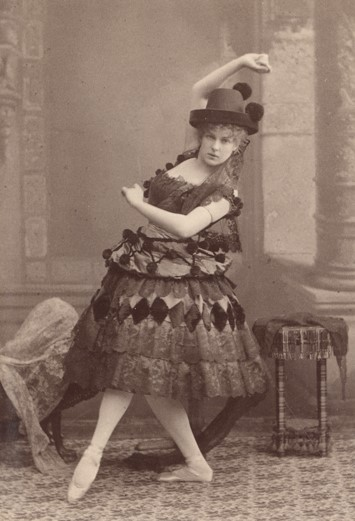
Marie Petipa in the Dance of the Spanish Lace

- Varvara Nikitina
- Vera Zhukova
- Alexandra Zhukova
- Alfred Bekefi
- Julia Kschessinska
- Mathilde Kschessinska
- Marie Petipa
- Elena Ogoleit
- Nikolai Andreyev
- Fedor Vasiliev
- Ivan Aslin

== Plot ==
Act I is set in a cave inhabited by several sorceresses. Act II presents various games — croquet, bingo, billiards, a spinning top, draughts, cards, and others — all allegorically played by various dancers. Act III features the Kingdom of the Laces, which presents a large variety of laces made by different nationalities, including Russian, French, Spanish, and Italian, in a series of dances.

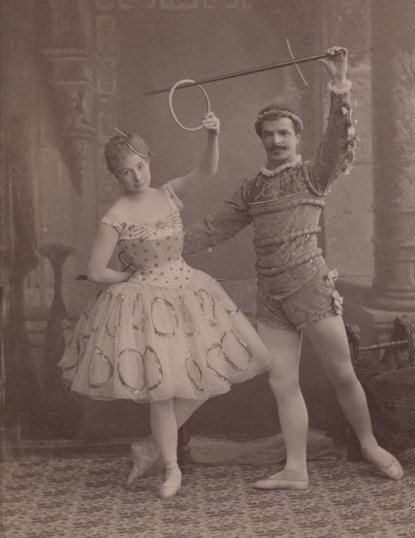
Vera Zhukova and Alfred Bekefi in the Dance of the Game of Hoops

== See also ==
- List of ballets by title
