= Evgenia Pavlovna Sokolova =

Russian dancer and educator

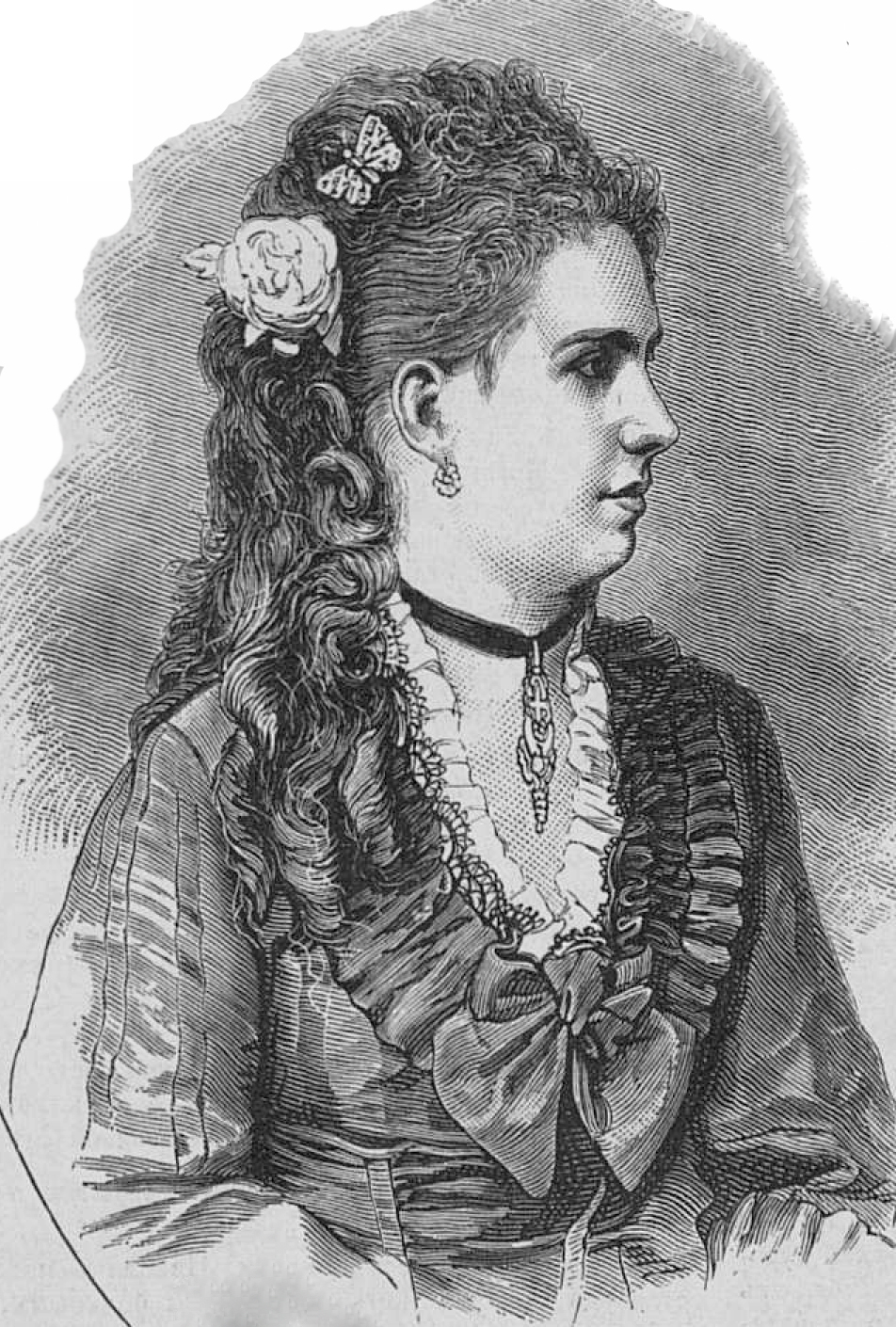
Evgenia Pavlovna Sokolova, an 1876 work by Pyotr Borel, engraved by Karl Petrovich Weyerman

Evgenia Pavlovna Sokolova (Russian: Евгения Павловна Соколова; 1 December 1850 – 2 August 1925) was a Russian dancer and educator. She was one of the most famous ballerinas of her period and later became a famous ballet teacher.

She was born in Saint Petersburg (later Leningrad) and studied at the Imperial Ballet Academy there with Marius Petipa, Lev Ivanov and Christian Johansson, graduating in 1869. She subsequently joined the Bolshoi Theatre, Saint Petersburg. She performed the leading roles in Petipa's ballets Les Aventures de Pélée, A Midsummer Night's Dream, Roxana, the Beauty of Montenegro, Mlada, Night and Day, The Sacrifices to Cupid and Pygmalion.

She taught advanced classes at the Mariinsky Theatre from 1902 to 1904 and again from 1920 to 1923. Her students included Anna Pavlova, Vera Trefilova, Tamara Karsavina, Lyubov Yegorova and Olga Spessivtseva.

Sokolova died in Leningrad at the age of 74.
