= Fiametta =

Ballet in four acts and four scenes

Marfa Muravieva in the Saint-Léon/Minkus Fiametta, Paris, 1864

Fiametta or Fiammetta, originally titled La Flamme d′amour, ou La Salamandre (also known as The Flame of Love, The Salamander or Néméa), is a ballet in four acts and four scenes, choreographed by Arthur Saint-Léon to music by Ludwig Minkus, first presented by the Ballet of the Moscow Imperial Bolshoi Theatre on November 12–24, 1863 (Julian/Gregorian calendar dates) at the Moscow Imperial Bolshoi Theatre, Moscow, Russia, with Anna Sobeshchanskaya as Fiametta.

== Plot ==
Fiametta is a fantastic creature, produced by Cupid from the flame of love, who took the form of an earthly girl in order to charm Count Sterngold and prevent him from marrying a rich bride Regonda for self-interest. Cupid, with the help of Fiametta, reunites Regonda and officer Otto, who love each other.

The action, which began on Olympus, was transferred to Tyrol. In an eclectic plot, a magical creature, mythological heroes, Tyrolean aristocrats and gypsies coexisted - the presence on the stage of fantastic as well as real characters from different layers of society allowed the choreographer to use both classical and characteristic dance. The reviewer Bocharov noted that the author “quite managed to reconcile the graceful pride of Greek mythological creatures with the un-ceremoniousness of some Tyrolean Count and the violent revelry of idle gypsies” (a few years later, a similar combination is used by Marius Petipa in his ballet Don Quixote).

=== Characters ===
- Cupid, god of love
- Fiametta
- Mercury
- Terpsichore
- Coquetry
- Count Friedrich Sterngold
- Ritter, his friend
- Molari, tutor and guardian of the Count
- Martini, servant of the count
- Princess Milfleur
- Regonda, her daughter
- Yolanda and Margarita, friends of Regonda
- Otto, officer
- Three graces, nymphs, cupids, muses, gypsies, Tyrolean villagers and villagers

=== Synopsis ===
==== Prologue ====
Scene I

The goddesses of Olympus worship Cupid. Terpsichore, nymphs and other mythological creatures entertain the inhabitants of Olympus with dances. Mercury appears. He informs Cupid that a young man has appeared on earth, denying his power. Having squandered his fortune, he intends to marry a rich heiress who is in love with a brave officer and these lovers cry to the god of love, hoping for his protection.

Cupid offers a view of Regonda and Otto on one side and a pavilion with the inscription "Temple closed to love", where he has fun, drinking wine and playing cards with friends, surrounded by gypsies, Count Sterngold - on the other.

Cupid decides to punish the dissolute count and help the lovers. Having extinguished the altar with the flame of love, he reproduces Fiametta: endowed with magical beauty, she must take revenge on Sterngold for insulting Cupid.

==== Act 1 ====
Scene II

Sterngold estate in Tyrol. The count is still having fun in the pavilion. A shot is fired, followed by Cupid in the guise of a hunter. Young people and gypsies persuade him to join their company. Cupid brings Fiametta in the guise of a gypsy. When she starts dancing, she charms Sterngold.

== Revivals ==
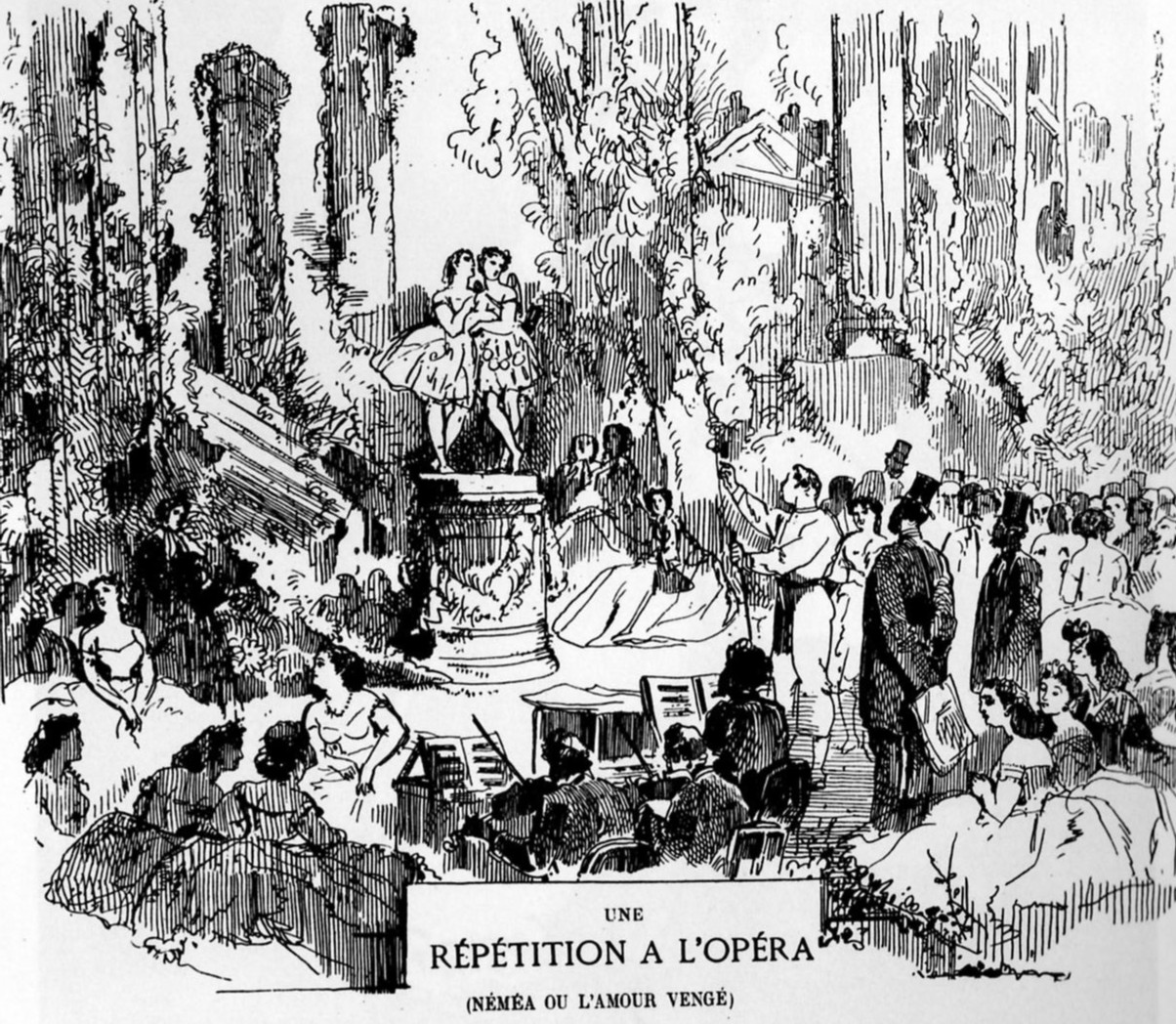
Lithograph of rehearsals at the Paris Opera of the Saint-Léon/Minkus Fiametta, Paris, 1864

- Restaging by Arthur Saint-Léon under the title Fiametta or The Devil In Love for the Imperial Ballet, with Minkus revising his score, first presented on February 13–25, 1864 at the Imperial Bolshoi Kamenny Theatre, St. Petersburg, Russia. Principal Dancers: Marfa Muravieva (as Fiametta), Lev Ivanov (as Count Friedrich), Vera Lyadova (as Cupid), Aleksandra Kemmerer (as Regonda), Christian Johansson (as Otto), and Maria Sokolova (as Terpsichore). Other interpreters of Fiametta were Praskovia Lebedeva, Mathilde Madaeva, Adèle Grantzow (November 15–27, 1865). Saint-Léon's 1864 staging of this work was the first Russian production of a ballet to make use of such stage devices as electric lighting and shadow effects with the aid of convex mirrors. (Note: An andante for solo cello (the Adagio from the Grand pas d'action) from Minkus' score for this ballet was a staple of the soloist repertoire in Imperial Russia, and is still occasionally heard.)
- Restaging by Arthur Saint-Léon under the title Néméa ou l'Amour Vengé (Nemea or The Avenged Love) in two acts and four scenes for the Ballet of the Académie Royale de Musique, with Minkus revising his score, first presented on July 11, 1864, at the Académie Royale de Musique in Paris. For this production Saint-Léon changed the name of the names of the principal characters of Fiametta and Count Friedrich to Néméa and Count Molder. Principal Dancers: Marfa Muravieva (as Néméa), Eugénie Fiorcre (as Cupid), Louis Mérante (as Count Molder).
- Restaging by Arthur Saint-Léon under the title Fiamma d'amore for Teatro Comunale di Trieste, with Giuseppe Camorano revising Minkus' score, first presented on March 15, 1868, in Trieste. Principal Dancers: Adèle Grantzow (as Fiametta).
- Revival by Marius Petipa under the title Fiametta for the Imperial Ballet in four acts, first presented on December 6–18, 1887 at the Imperial Mariinsky Theatre, St. Petersburg, Russia. Principal Dancers: Elena Cornalba (as Fiametta), Alexandre Shiryaev (as Cupid), and Pavel Gerdt (as Count Fiedrich).
