= Don Quixote (ballet) =

Ballet

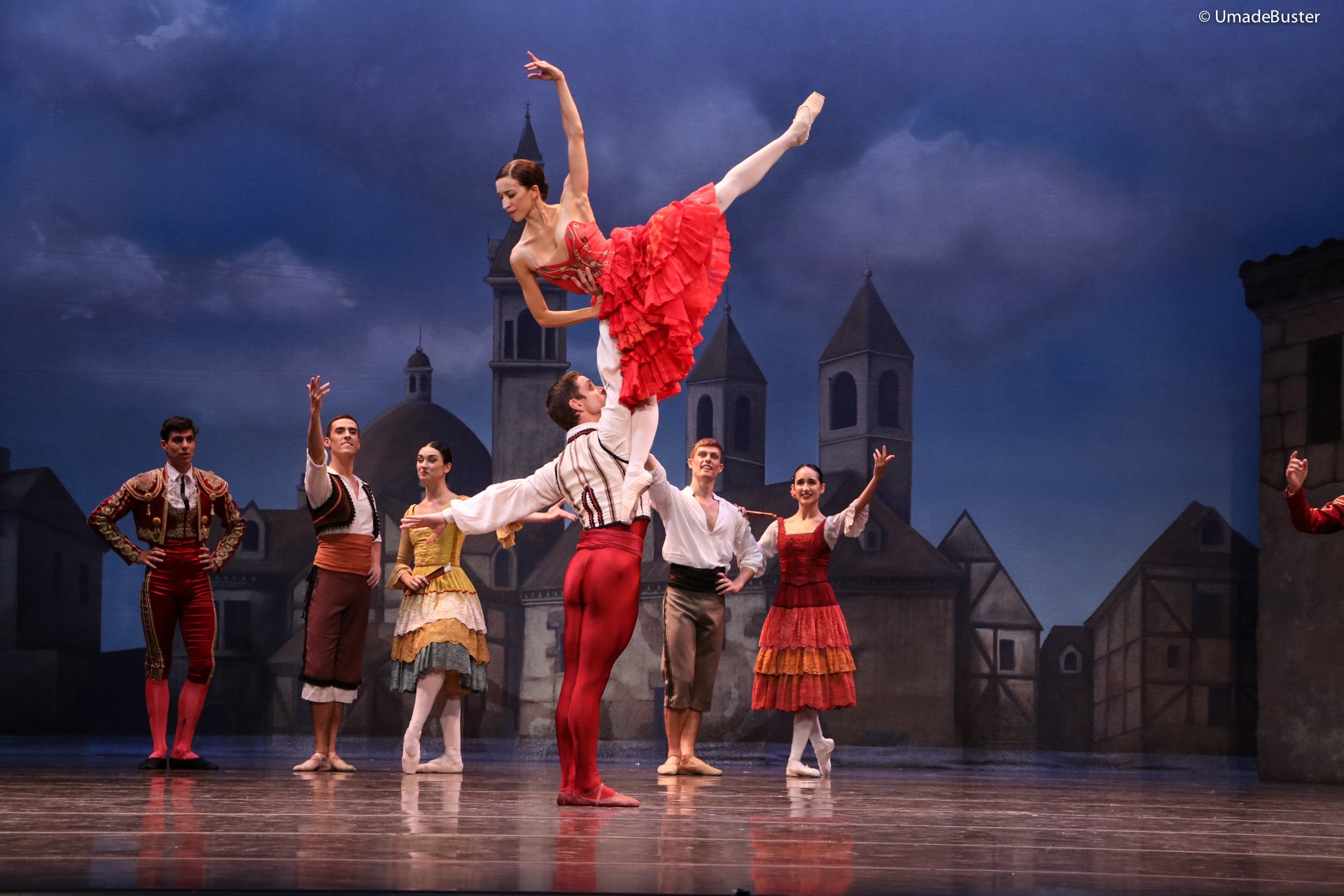
Don Quixote performed by the Spanish National Dance Company

Don Quixote is a ballet in three acts, based on episodes taken from the famous novel Don Quixote de la Mancha by Miguel de Cervantes. It was originally choreographed by Marius Petipa to the music of Ludwig Minkus and first presented by Moscow's Bolshoi Ballet on 26 December [O.S. 14 December] 1869. Petipa and Minkus revised the ballet into a more elaborate and expansive version in five acts and eleven scenes for the Mariinsky Ballet, first presented on 21 November [O.S. 9 November] 1871 at the Imperial Bolshoi Kamenny Theatre of St. Petersburg.

All modern productions of the Petipa/Minkus ballet are derived from the version staged by Alexander Gorsky for the Bolshoi Theatre of Moscow in 1900, a production the ballet master staged for the Imperial Ballet of St. Petersburg in 1902.

== History ==
=== Earlier versions ===
The two chapters of the novel that the ballet is mostly based on were first adapted for the ballet in 1740 by Franz Hilverding in Vienna, Austria. In 1768, Jean Georges Noverre mounted a new version of Don Quixote in Vienna to the music of Josef Starzer, a production that appears to have been a revival of the original by Hilverding.

Charles Didelot, known today as the "father of Russian Ballet", staged a two-act version of Don Quixote in St. Petersburg for the Imperial Ballet in 1808. In 1809, a version of the work was mounted at Her Majesty's Theatre by James Harvey D'Egville. Paul Taglioni (brother of Marie Taglioni) presented his own version of Don Quixote for the Berlin Court Opera Ballet in 1839, and his uncle, Salvatore Taglioni, set a production at the Teatro Regio in Turin, Italy in 1843.

=== Marius Petipa's original production and revival ===
The most famous and enduring ballet adaptation was created by the choreographer Marius Petipa, unrivaled Maître de Ballet of the Tsar's Imperial Ballet of St. Petersburg, and the composer Ludwig Minkus. By special commission, Petipa mounted the work for the Ballet of the Imperial Bolshoi Theatre in Moscow. The production premiered on 26 December [O.S. 14 December] 1869 to great success.

Petipa then restaged the ballet in a far more opulent and grandiose production for the St. Petersburg Imperial Ballet on 21 November [O.S. 9 November] 1871. This new production consisted of five acts: eleven episodes, a prologue, and an epilogue; and used the same designs as the first production.

=== Alexander Gorsky's revivals ===
Alexander Gorsky presented his revival of the ballet for the Ballet of the Moscow Imperial Bolshoi Theatre on 19 December [O.S. 6 December] 1900, a production that he then staged for the Imperial Ballet of St. Petersburg, premiering on 2 February [O.S. 20 January] 1902.

For his productions of 1900 and 1902 Gorsky added new dances to music by Anton Simon – a variation for the Queen of the Dryads, and a dance for her mistresses, as well as an additional Spanish dance for the last scene. When he staged the production in St. Petersburg in 1902, the ballerina Mathilde Kschessinskaya, who danced Kitri/Dulcinea added the famous Variation of Kitri with the fan for the ballet's final pas de deux, and the Variation of Kitri as Dulcinea for the scene of Don Quixote's dream.

It is widely believed that Gorsky interpolated the Grand Pas des toréadors from the 1881 Petipa/Minkus ballet Zoraiya, a piece that is still included in modern productions of Don Quixote. However, this piece was already in Don Quixote by the time Gorsky came to revive it as it was found published in the ballet score in 1882. Therefore, the likelihood is that it was actually Petipa himself who interpolated the Grand Pas des toréadors in Don Quixote.

Gorsky's 1902 revival was not well received in St. Petersburg, causing shock among both Petipa and ballet enthusiasts, who claimed that the production was a mutilation of Petipa's original masterpiece by one of his former students and dancers.

The ballet lived on in Russia well after the revolution of 1917, whereas many other ballets ceased to be performed into the Soviet period. In fact, it became part of the permanent repertoire both of the Moscow Bolshoi Theatre (the most famous productions being those of Rostislav Zakharov and Kasyan Goleizovsky in 1940, which included new music by Vassily Soloviev-Sedoy) and Leningrad's Kirov Theatre (which saw productions by Fyodor Lopukhov in 1923, with new choreography for the fandango, and by Pyotr Gusev in 1946, with the scenario modified by Yuri Slonomsky and with new dances introduced by Nina Anisimova).

== Roles and original cast ==
Role	Moscow 1869	St Petersburg 1871	St Petersburg 1902
Don Quixote	Wilhelm Vanner	Timofei Stukolkin	Alexei Bulgakov
Sancho Panza	Vassily Geltser		Enrico Cecchetti
Kitri	Anna Sobeshchanskaya	Alexandra Vergina	Mathilde Kschessinska
Basilio	Sergei Sokolov	Lev Ivanov	Nikolai Legat
Gamache	Dmitri Kuznetsov	Nikolai Goltz	Pavel Gerdt
The Street Dancer			Olga Preobrajenska
Juanita			Anna Pavlova
Dulcinea del Toboso	Pelageya Karpakova	Alexandra Vergina	Mathilde Kschessinska
Amor			Tamara Karsavina

== From Russia to the rest of the world ==
Don Quixote was brought from Russia to other countries first by Anna Pavlova's company in 1924 in an abridged version of Gorsky's 1902 production, though the full-length work was not staged abroad for many years. The famous Grand Pas de Deux from the ballet's final scene was staged in the West as early as the 1940s, given first by the Ballet Russe de Monte-Carlo. The first full-length production mounted outside of Russia was a completely new staging, produced and choreographed by Ninette de Valois for The Royal Ballet in 1950. The first full revival of the original Russian production to be staged in the West was by Ballet Rambert in 1962. In 1966 Rudolf Nureyev staged his version for the Vienna State Opera Ballet, with Minkus' score adapted by John Lanchbery. In 1973, Nureyev filmed his version with the Australian Ballet and Robert Helpmann as Don Quixote. Mikhail Baryshnikov mounted his own version in 1980 for American Ballet Theatre, a production that has been staged by many companies, including the Royal Ballet, though the company would later stage Nureyev's version and most recently, Carlos Acosta's. Today the ballet has been staged by many companies all over the world in many different versions, and is considered to be among the great classics of the ballet.

American choreographer George Balanchine famously created a modern version in 1965 for the New York City Ballet to the music of Nicolas Nabokov, with Balanchine himself appearing as Don Quixote and Suzanne Farrell as Dulcinea and Francisco Moncion as Merlin. This production had nothing to do with the Minkus version. It was only given until the mid-1970s and then taken out of the repertory of the company. In 2005 it was reconstructed by Farrell for the company, and continues to be performed.

First presented by San Francisco Ballet in 2003 under the staging of Helgi Tómasson and then-principal dancer Yuri Possokhov, Don Quixote has recently been revived by SFB. Possokhov spent his youth dancing with the Bolshoi Ballet, experience that provided unique insights and details that have been incorporated into the production. Another recent version has been created for the Royal Ballet at The Royal Opera House, Covent Garden; it has choreography by Carlos Acosta and the Minkus score has been adapted by Martin Yates, the scenery and costume designs are by Tim Hatley. More recently, the Moscow Festival Ballet is touring the ballet in the U.S. in 2014.

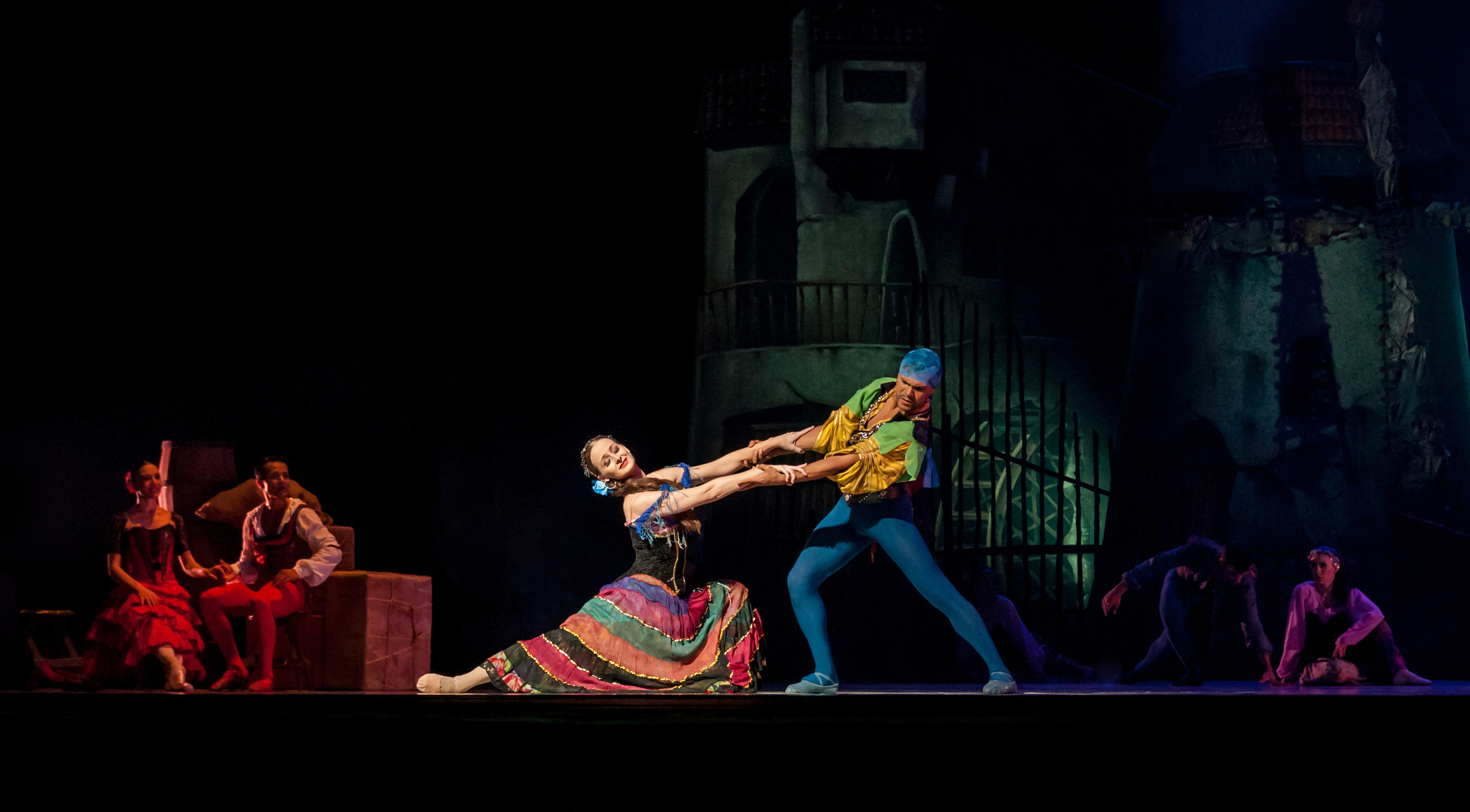
A performance of Don Quixote in Venezuela, 2013

In 1987, the Northern Ballet (UK) commissioned choreographer Michael Pink to create a three-act version with Artistic Director Christopher Gable in the role of the Don. The plot was reworked to include more of the adventures of the Don and Sancho Panza. The story of Kitri and Basilio, which traditionally runs throughout most versions of the full-length ballet is told in Act One of Pink's version. Act Two follows the Don and Sancho as they encounter a band of gypsies, are caught in a sandstorm resulting in the Don being knocked unconscious and his dream of Dulcinea. Act Three told the encounter of the Duchess and the bearded ladies to which the Don, blindfolded, imagines he rides a flying horse to kill the demon that has cursed the ladies. Toreadors and their ladies entertain the court, this includes the traditional grand pas de deux. The ballet ends after the arrival of the knight of the mirrors. Michael Pink restaged the work for the Milwaukee Ballet in 2005 with additional changes to the Prologue and Act Three. This production was presented again in 2014.

== Petipa's first version from 1869 ==
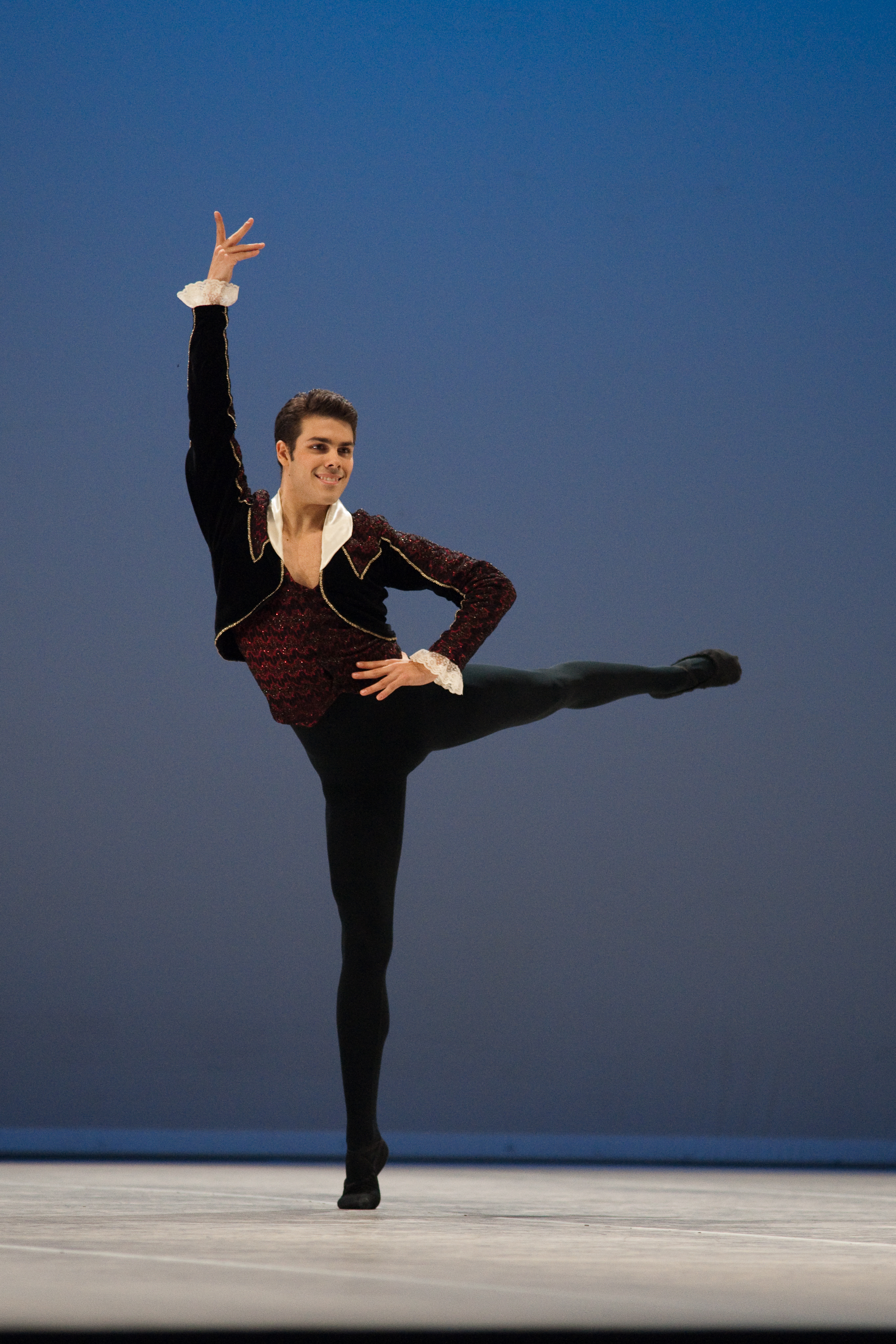
Aaron Smyth as Basilio in 2010

Characters

- Bachelor of Arts Sanson Carrasco
- Antonina
- Don Quixote
- Sancho Panza
- Lorenzo, an innkeeper
- Kitri, his daughter
- Basilio, a barber, Kitri's lover
- A Gypsy Chief
- Graziosa, his daughter
- Dulcinea del Toboso
- Gamache, betrothed to marry Kitri
- Villagers, Toreadors, Gypsies, Fairies, Gnomes, Dryads.

Prologue

Don Quixote's Study

Bachelor Sanson Carrasco is seen covering a bookcase with wallpaper, while Antonina is putting some rusty old armour and a helmet made of pasteboard into a cupboard. Don Quixote de la Mancha enters, reading a book. He goes to the bookcase and, not finding it, believes it has been stolen by evil magicians. Then he settles into an armchair and continues reading. He delights in stories of brave knights, fabulous giants and other fantastical creatures, but most of all Don Quixote dreams of his beloved Dulcinea, a woman that he believes to be so lovely and noble that she must be divinity. Gradually he nods and falls asleep to dream of their romantic adventures. Darkness falls.

Suddenly his servant, Sancho Panza, climbs hurriedly through the window. In pursuit are several angry women from the market from whom he has stolen bread and a chicken. Awakened by the commotion, Don Quixote sends the women away. Don Quixote tells Sancho that he is determined to seek adventures as a knight-errant, all the while searching for his beloved Dulcinea. He shows him the pasteboard helmet, which, with one sweep from his sword, becomes a shapeless mass on the floor. Antonina suggests that he should use a shaving basin instead, which would make a splendid helmet. Don Quixote enthusiastically agrees and, placing it on his head, orders Sancho to bring him his armour, sword and spear, and to make ready his horse, Rocinante.

Act I

A market-place in Barcelona

Kitri, an inn-keeper's daughter, steals out of her house to meet her beloved, the barber Basilio. Her father, Lorenzo, sees the lovers and sends Basilio away, bringing Kitri to tears. Now comes the rich nobleman Gamache, who, likewise in love with Kitri, goes to Lorenzo and asks for his daughter's hand. The innkeeper accepts with delight but Kitri, appalled at the thought of wedding the foppish nobleman, runs away.

Dancing begins in the square and some toreadors try to kidnap the girls they fancy, but their relatives and lovers hasten to their aid. At this moment Don Quixote arrives mounted on Rocinante, followed by Sancho, who is riding a donkey. At his master's command Sancho sounds his rusted horn, causing the townspeople to cover their ears. Lorenzo runs out of his inn, and Don Quixote, taking him for the lord of a famous castle, dismounts Rocinante and, falling to his knees, begs to be allowed to serve him. Charmed, Lorenzo invites the knight to sit on his balcony. Sancho remains in the square where he is surrounded by girls who induce him to take part in a game of blind man's bluff. Then some boys bring in a blanket on which they place Sancho and proceed to toss him into the air. Don Quixote hurries to his assistance and sets him free.

Peasants gather in the square and dancing resumes. Kitri returns and, noticing her, Don Quixote acclaims her as his Dulcinea, whom evil magicians have reduced to human form. Becoming jealous of her affection for Basilio, Don Quixote attempts to woo her by partnering her in a minuet. Lorenzo berates Kitri for carrying on with Basilio. Kitri and Basilio then run away, and Lorenzo and Gamache follow them. Don Quixote orders Sancho to bring Rocinante, so that he may also set out in pursuit.

Act II

Scene 1 – A camp of gypsies among the windmills outside the village

Kitri, disguised as a boy is seen walking with Harlequin from a troupe of travelling actors. They guess she is a girl and ask her to stay with them.

Scene 2 - The Puppet Theatre

A clown is seen walking with Graziosa, the gypsy chief's daughter. A gypsy tells the chief of the approach of Don Quixote. The chief plans a trick for his benefit and, putting on a mantle crown, sits down as though he were a king on a throne. Don Quixote is deceived and kneels to the chief in homage. The chief bids that he sit beside him and orders a festival to be given in his honor. This begins with Gypsy dances and is followed by a performance of the marionette theatre. Don Quixote is delighted with the entertainment but, mistaking the heroine for his Dulcinea and the marionettes for soldiers attacking her, he rises to assault them. The gypsies are terrified. At this moment the clown and Graziosa run away.

Scene 3 - The Windmills

Flushed with victory, the knight kneels and renders thanks to heaven. Seeing the Moon, he takes it for his Dulcinea and tries to get to her. As he approaches the windmills he can see the Moon no longer and thinks that evil magicians have hidden his beloved mistress. So, spear in hand, he tilts at the wings of the windmill, which he mistakes for a giant. Alas, the knight is caught by one of the wings and flung into the air. He falls unconscious at Sancho's feet.

Scene 4 – A forest

Through the trees appears Sancho leading Rocinante, upon which sits the wounded Don Quixote. The servant lifts his master down and places him on the grass, so that he may rest. Then, tying up the horse, he goes to sleep. Don Quixote also tries to sleep, but is troubled by fantastic dreams.

Scene 5 – The enchanted Garden of Dulcinea

Fairies appear surrounded by gnomes and Don Quixote finds himself dressed in shining armor. Then comes a succession of fearsome monsters, the last being a gigantic spider, who spins a web. The knight attacks the spider, which he slashes in half with his sword. At that same moment the spider's web vanishes to reveal a beautiful garden, filled with dryads and beautiful women, presided over by the Queen of the Dryads and Amor. Among them is Dulcinea and Don Quixote kneels before his beloved. At this moment everything vanishes.

Act III

The Square

Back at the square, Kitri and Basilio join those who are dancing. At the height of the merriment, Lorenzo and Gamache arrive, followed by Don Quixote and Sancho. Seeing his daughter, Lorenzo decides to give his blessing to her union with the nobleman Gamache. Basilio becomes annoyed and, reproaching Kitri for her unfaithfulness, draws a sword and stabs himself. As he lies dying he begs Lorenzo to unite him with Kitri, but Lorenzo and Gamache refuse. Don Quixote approaches Gamache and challenges him to a duel for having refused a dying man's wish. Gamache declines to fight and the merrymakers drive him out of the inn. Taking pity, Lorenzo agrees to unite Basilio and Kitri. At this moment, Basilio pulls out the sword and tells everyone it was a joke.

Act IV

The Tavern

A magnificent feast is held in honour of Don Quixote. Suddenly the Knight of the Silver Moon challenges him to a duel, which results in the latter being vanquished. The victorious knight proves to be none other than Bachelor Sanson Carrasco, who forces Don Quixote to vow that he will not unsheathe his sword for a whole year. The sorrowful knight, true to his vow, takes up his warlike gear and, followed by Sancho, sets out for home.

== Petipa's second version from 1871 ==
When Petipa revived Don Quixote in 1871 for the Imperial Ballet of St Petersburg, many changes were made to the libretto and he requested a new fifth act in three scenes from Minkus. Some of the changes included the following:

- Don Quixote no longer regarded Kitri as his protégée; now he actually mistakes her for Dulcinea and she appears as such in the dream scene. It was in this revival that the roles of Kitri and Dulcinea became a dual role, whereas in the 1869 Moscow production, they were danced by two different ballerinas.
- Two new characters - the Duke and Duchess - were added and many of the comic scenes and character dances were cut.
- Basilio's mock suicide was transferred to Act 2 and happened before the Windmill scene, rather than after.
- The location for the fifth and final act was changed to the Duke and Duchess's castle.
- The ending was changed - Don Quixote's duel with the Knight of the Silver Moon was cut and the ballet ended with an epilogue in which Don Quixote and Sancho Panza set out again on their quest after Kitri and Basilio's wedding.

== Image gallery ==
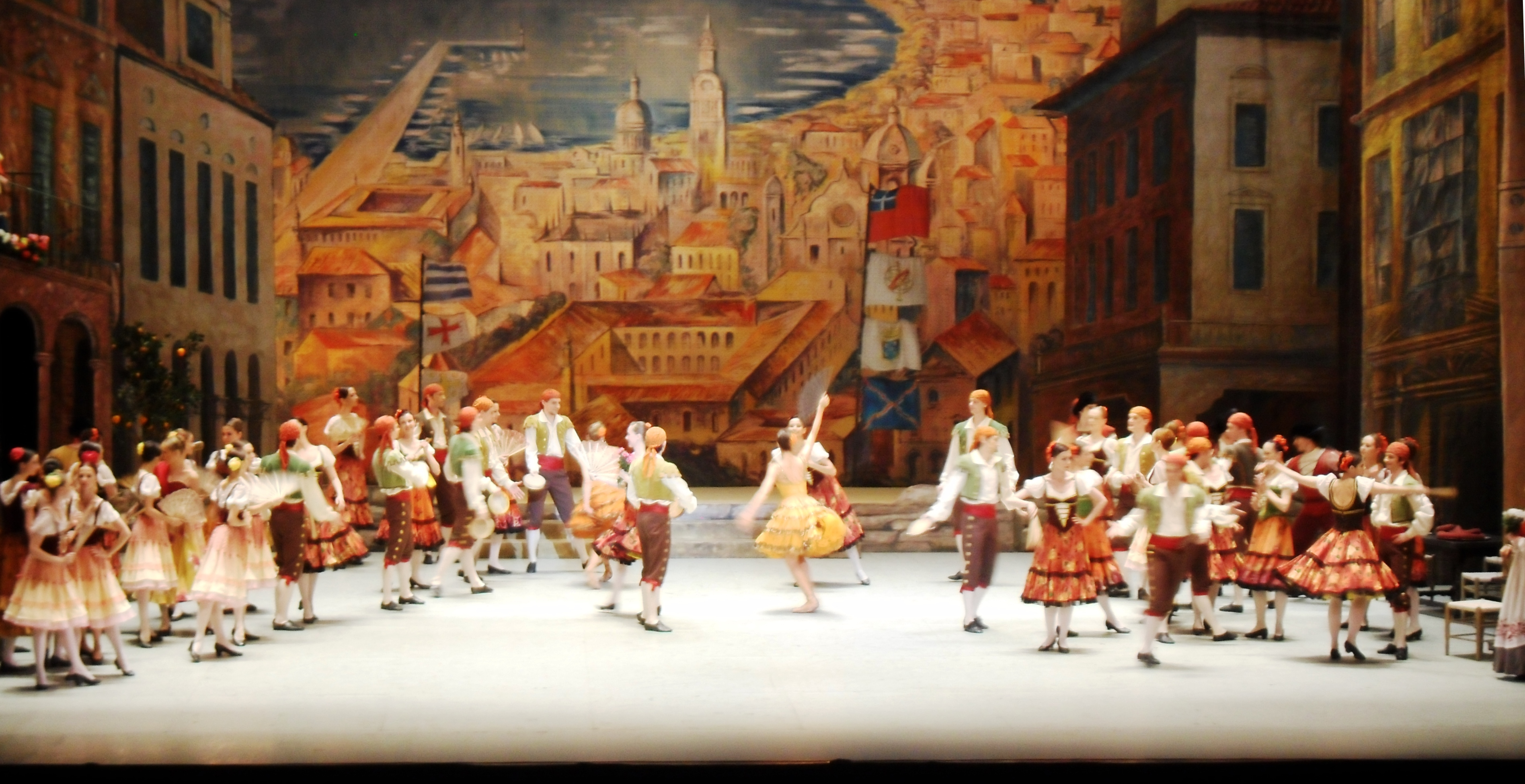
Extract of Act I of Don Quixote (Bolchoï ballet)

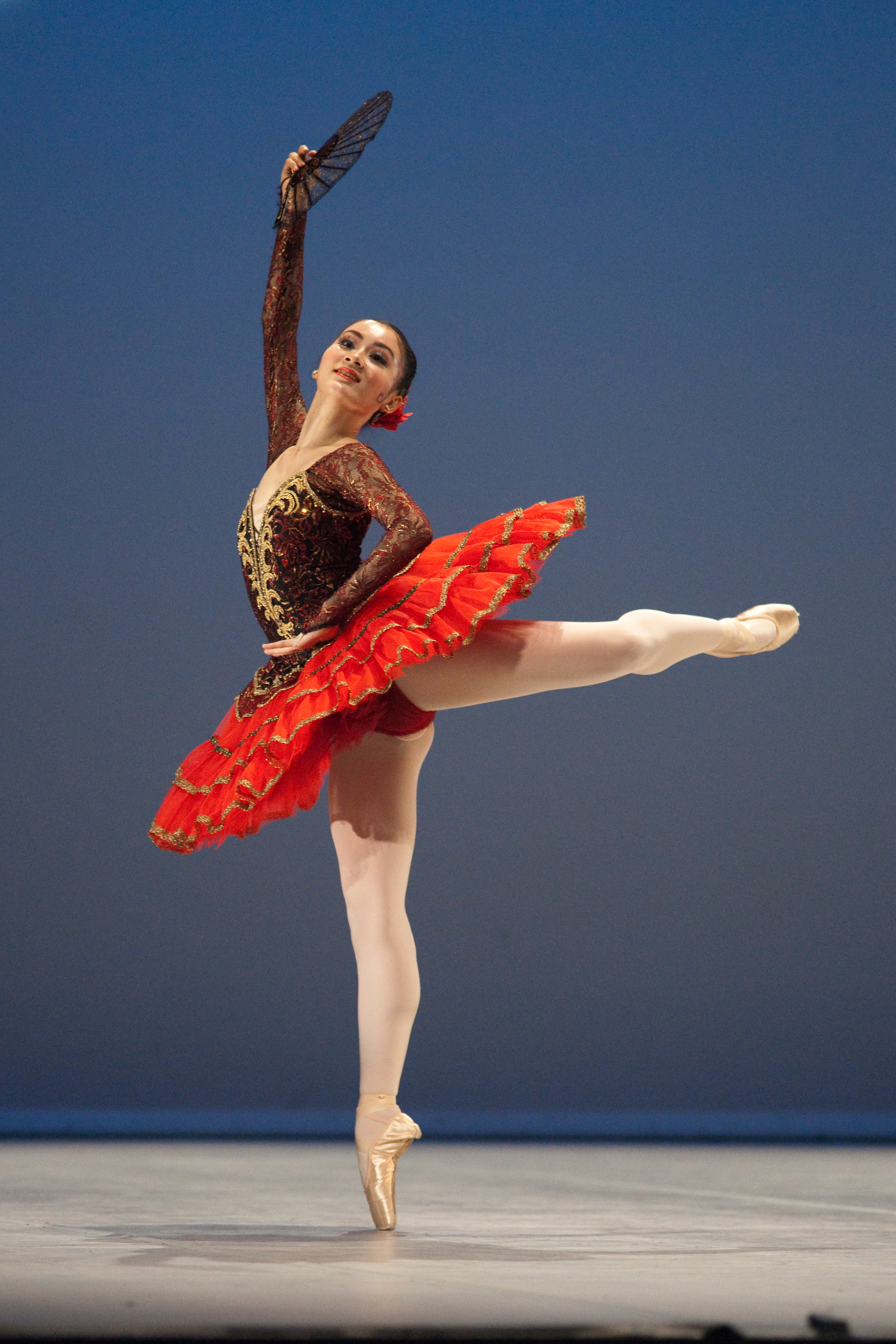
A variation of Don Quixote

== Articles ==
- NY Times by Lawrence Van Gelder, 25 March 2008
