= The Sacrifices to Cupid =

1886 ballet by Marius Petipa

The Corps de Ballet of the Imperial Ballet in Lev Ivanov's revival of the Petipa/Minkus The Sacrifices to Cupid. St. Petersburg, 1893

The Sacrifices to Cupid (AKA L'Offrande à l'Amour or The Offerings to Cupid; ru: "Жертвы Амуру, или Радости любви") is a "grand ballet" in 1 Act/1 scene with choreography by Marius Petipa and music by Ludwig Minkus.

The ballet was first presented by the Imperial Ballet on July 22/August 3, 1886, in honour of Empress Maria Feodorovna (Dagmar of Denmark), at Petergof by the Imperial Ballet, and on November 25/December 7 (Julian/Gregorian calendar dates), 1886 at the Imperial Mariinsky Theatre.

Principal Dancers: Eugeniia Sokolova (as Chloë)

== Revivals ==
A revival was staged by Lev Ivanov for the Imperial Ballet, and first presented on September 26/October 8, 1893 at the Imperial Mariinsky Theatre.

Principal Dancers: Olga Preobrajenskaya (as Chloë)

=== Notes ===
- This work was Minkus' last composition for the Imperial Ballet as First Imperial Ballet Composer before the post was abolished in 1886 by the Mariinsky Theatre's director Ivan Vsevolozhsky.
