= Les Aventures de Pélée =

1876 ballet by Marius Petipa

Les Aventures de Pélée (The Adventures of Peleus; Russian: Приключения Пелея) is a ballet in three acts and five scenes with choreography by Marius Petipa and music by Ludwig Minkus, with additional music adapted from works by Léo Delibes. The libretto by Marius Petipa is derived from the Greek Myth concerning the Goddess Thetis and the circumstances surrounding her marriage, arranged by Jupiter (or Zeus), to the mortal Peleus.

It was first presented by the Imperial Ballet on 30 January [O.S. 18 January] 1876 at the Imperial Bolshoi Kammeny Theatre in St. Petersburg, Russia, with Eugeniia Sokolova (as the Goddess Thetis), Pavel Gerdt (as Peleus), Lyubov Savitskaya (as Cupid), Mariia Gorshenkova (as Venus), Christian Johansson (as Jupiter), Lev Ivanov (as Adonis), and Platon Karsavin (as Triton).

== Revivals ==
The ballet was revived by Marius Petipa as Les Noces de Thétis et Pélée in one act/3 scenes for the Imperial Ballet, with Riccardo Drigo making additions and revising the Minkus/Delibes score, and presented for the Imperial court outdoor at Olga Island in the parc of Peterhof on 9 August [O.S. 28 July] 1897, for a gala performance in honour of a state visit from Kaiser Wilhelm II. Principal Dancers: Mathilde Kschessinskaya (as the Goddess Thetis), Pavel Gerdt (as Peleus), Olga Preobrajenskaya (as Cupid), Olga Leonova (as Venus), Lyubov Roslavleva (as Flora), Alexei Bulgakov (as Jupiter), and Sergei Legat (as Adonis).

There was only one full resumption of this ballet by choreographer Alexey Bogdanov.
