= Le Lys =

Ballet

Le Lys (The Lily), also known as Liliya, is a ballet in 3 acts/4 scenes, with choreography by Arthur Saint-Léon and music by Ludwig Minkus and Léo Delibes.

The ballet was first presented by the Imperial Ballet on 2 November [O.S. 21 October] 1869, at the Imperial Bolshoi Kamenny Theatre in St. Petersburg, Russia.

Principal dancers at the première included Adèle Grantzow.

== Notes ==
- For this ballet Minkus reused and adapted much of the music he had composed for Saint-Léon's 1866 La Source.
