= Kalkabrino =

1891 ballet by Marius Petipa

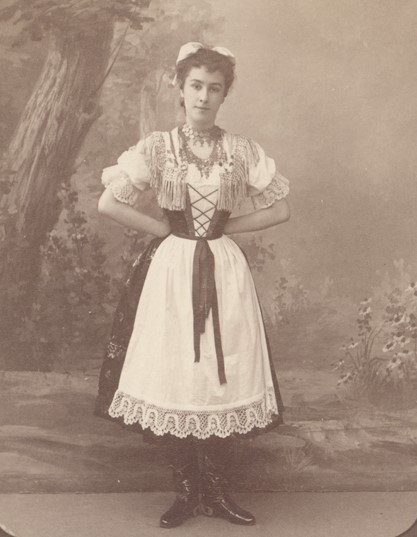
- Mathilde Kschessinska as Marietta, 1892
- Choreographer: Marius Petipa
- Music: Ludwig Minkus
- Premiere: 25 February 1891 [O.S. 13 February 1891] Imperial Mariinsky Theatre, Saint Petersburg, Russia
- Original ballet company: Imperial Russian Ballet
- Setting: Provence

Kalkabrino is a ballet in three acts and three scenes, with choreography by Marius Petipa and music by Ludwig Minkus. The story was written by Modest Ilyich Tchaikovsky.

The ballet was first presented by the Imperial Russian Ballet on February 13, 1891, on the Julian calendar (25 February 1891 in the Gregorian calendar) at the Imperial Mariinsky Theatre in Saint Petersburg, Russia. Its premiere was a benefit performance for its lead ballerina Carlotta Brianza, who had created the role of Princess Aurora in Petipa's ballet The Sleeping Beauty the year before.

== Production ==
Despite Petipa's specific request for Minkus to collaborate with him for Kalkabrino, this work was not produced with the participation of Minkus, who would retire to Vienna later in 1891. Instead, the score was a pastiche of airs extracted from several of his earlier ballets, some of which had never premiered. Kalkabrino marked the final collaboration, however indirect, of Petipa and Minkus.

The only part of the musical score still in use is the "Variation of Draginiatza" from Act II, which is used in the famous Paquita grand pas classique.

== Original cast ==
- Pavel Gerdt — as Kalkabrino, a fearsome bandit
- Carlotta Brianza — as Marietta, a gentle flower-seller / Draginiatza, a powerful she-demon
- Nikolai Legat — as Olivier, Marietta's lover
- Felix Kschessinsky — as René, Marietta's father
- Enrico Cecchetti — as Reuben
- Marie Petipa — as Cigala

== Plot ==
The ballet is set in Provence, France. The title character, Kalkabrino, is a brutish bandit and smuggler who desires the fragile flower-seller Marietta and tries to carry her off by force. She is defended by her lover, Olivier, who drives Kalkabrino off. Afterward, Kalkabrino is targeted for his sins by a host of evil spirits, led by the fearsome she-demon Draginiatza, who takes on the appearance of Marietta to torment Kalkabrino. Ultimately, Kalkabrino is dragged off to hell by the evil spirits to pay for his lifetime of wicked deeds.

== See also ==
- Russian ballet
