= Night and Day (ballet) =

1883 ballet by Marius Petipa

Night and Day (La Nuit et le Jour or The Night and the Day) is a fantastic ballet in 1 act/3 scenes, with choreography by Marius Petipa and music by Ludwig Minkus.

This ballet was produced for the festivities held at the Moscow Imperial Bolshoi Theatre in honor of the coronation of Tsar Alexander III and Empress Maria Feodorovna, who were crowned at the Uspensky Cathedral of the Moscow Kremlin three days prior to the ballet's premiere. The Tsar was so impressed by the work (being an avid balletomane) that he ordered the work be performed a second time two days later for a performance attended only by his immediate family. A March from the work was among the Tsar's favorite pieces, and he often requested that his orchestra play it during Imperial Balls and other social events for the St. Petersburg royalty and nobility.

The ballet was premièred on May 18/30 (Julian/Gregorian calendar dates), 1883, at the Moscow Imperial Bolshoi Theatre by the Imperial Ballet.

== Cast ==
Role	Dancer
The Queen of the Night	Eugenia Sokolova
The Queen of the Day	Ekaterina Vazem
The Night Star	Maria Gorshenkova
The Morning Star	Anna Johansson
The Fly	Pavel Gerdt
The Dove	Varvara Nikitina
The Queen Bee	Alexandra Vinogradova
A Swan	Augusta Ogoleyt
A Naiad	Alexandra Shaposhnikova

== Synopsis ==
A pastoral landscape, the edge of a forest bordering a lake. The moon shines through the leaves. The Spirits of the Day are shackled near the sanctuary where the sacred fire of the sun is burning.

All nature is peaceful. The Night Star announces the arrival of her sovereign. The other stars are persuaded to descend from the heavens and to take part in the Festival of Darkness. A group of naiads and nereids rise up from the depth of the lake, while dryads emerge from the trunks of the ancient oaks. All dance in the moonlight. They are joined by wilis, delicate offspring of the clouds, and swans transformed into women who dance around, while ferns clasp them in their feathery arms. The Queen of the Night appears in the midst of this fantastic assembly. She joins in the merrymaking, but always watches for the Spirits of the Day since their appearance will mark the end of her reign.

The moon sinks behind the mountains as the last hour of the night passes by and the horizon is illuminated by the first rays of the new dawn. The Morning Star breaks the chains of the captive spirits of the sun so that they can engage in the eternal conflict with the Deities of Darkness. A fierce battle rages, but Time appears and brings the conflict to an end. Night must inevitably give way to Day. The dawn colours the sky red and finally, disperses the Spirits of Darkness. The way is now open for the Sun, which floods the landscape with golden rays.

The Queen of the Day with her companions greets the Star of Light. All nature comes alive; as the trees stir, leaves unfold at the touch of the rays, flowers rise on their erect stalks and open. Colourful birds dart about, while insects and butterflies perform a song of peace and love in the golden light. A swarm of bees appears and collect their offerings from the flowers. A distant song is heard. Representatives from the different provinces of Russia arrive to celebrate the Festival of Light. The Spirits of the Day vanish and the birds and insects fly off.

The hillsides are covered with people and the lake is covered in boats. The nations of the Empire are united in giving homage to the Star of the Day, which shines in splendour and radiates happiness and abundance. All the provinces are represented. Dancing begins and at the climax, the Spirit of Russia appears, carried by an eagle and floating over all the people and glory of Russia. Bright colours forming an aureole are dispersed to reveal a great panorama of the cities of Russia.
