= Olga Spessivtseva =

Russian ballet dancer (1895–1991)

- Ольга Спесивцева
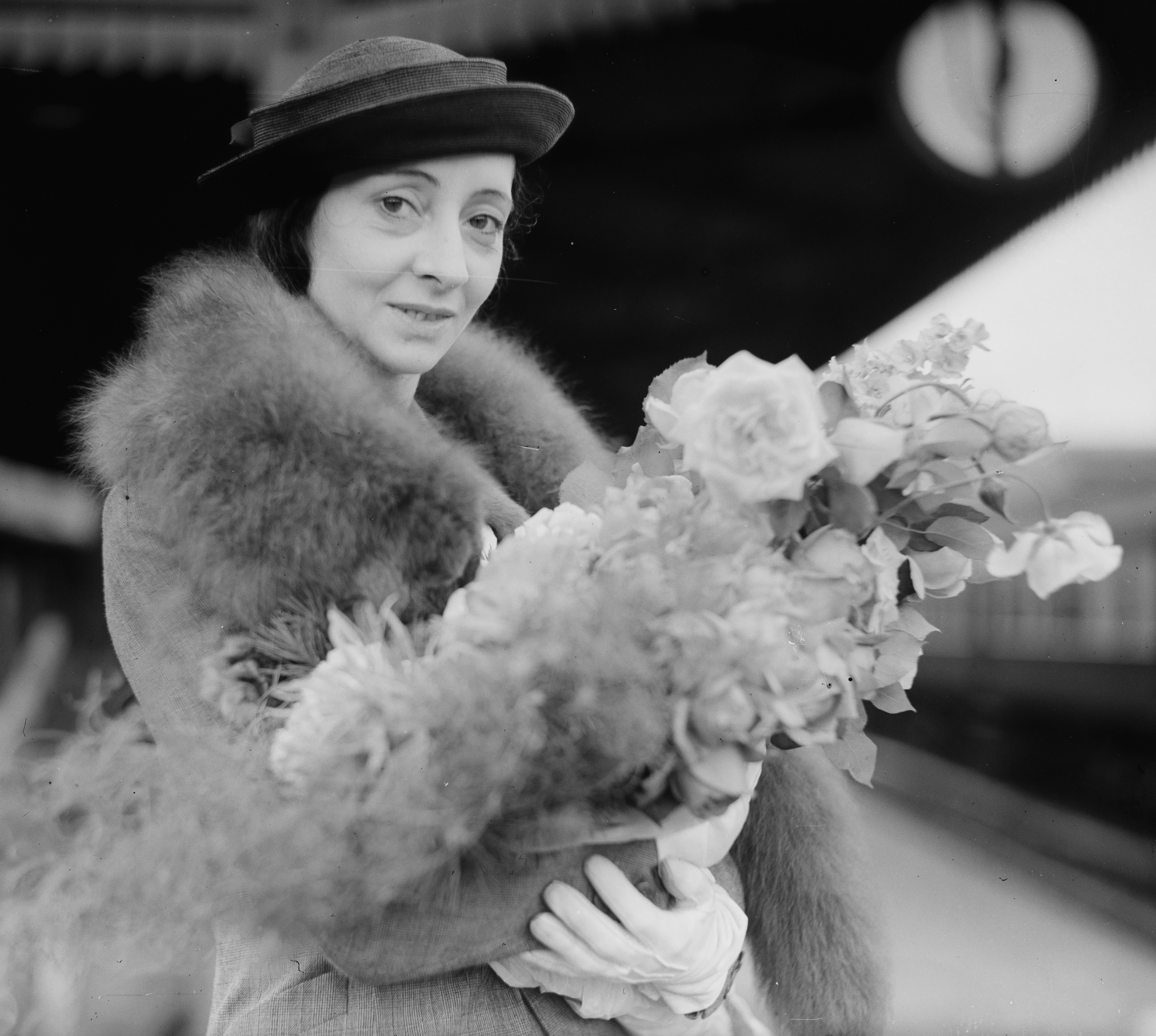
- Spessivtseva in 1934
- Born: Olga Alexandrovna Spessivtseva; 18 July 1895; Rostov-on-Don, Russia
- Died: September 16, 1991 (aged 96); Valley Cottage, New York, U.S.
- Occupations: Ballet dancer; choreographer; ballet teacher

Olga Alexandrovna Spessivtseva (Note: Surname also transcribed in English as Spesivtseva or Spessivtzeva.) (Russian: Ольга Алекса́ндровна Спеси́вцева; 18 July [O.S. 6 July] 1895 – 16 September 1991) was a Russian ballerina whose stage career spanned from 1913 to 1939.

She was considered as one of the finest Russian prima ballerinas by dance writers.

== Biography ==
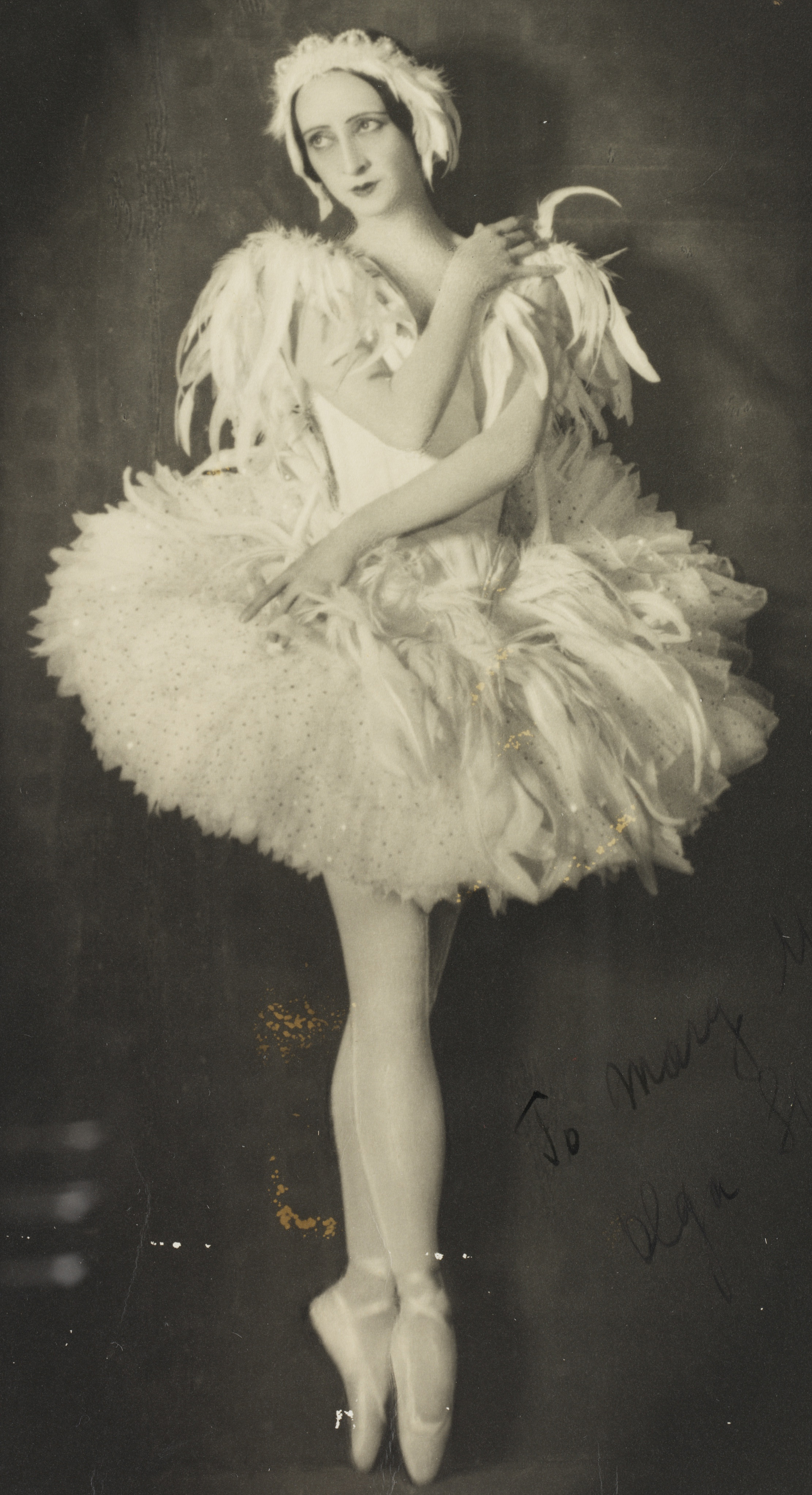
Spessivtseva in costume for Swan Lake

Olga Spessivtseva was born in Rostov-on-Don, the daughter of an opera singer and his wife. After her father's death, she was sent to an orphanage with theatrical connections in St. Petersburg, a center of culture. She entered St. Petersburg's Imperial Ballet Academy in 1906, where she was a student of Klavdia Kulichevskaya and later of Yevgenia Sokolova and Agrippina Vaganova.

After graduating in 1913, she joined the Mariinsky Theatre company, where she was promoted to soloist in 1916. She was a romantic dancer and according to some, she was uniquely suited for roles such as Giselle and Odette-Odile in Swan Lake and quickly became one of the most popular dancers in the company.

In 1916, Sergei Diaghilev invited her to tour with the Ballets Russes in the United States, where she danced with Vaslav Nijinsky in Le Spectre de la Rose, Les Sylphides and the "Bluebird pas de deux" from The Sleeping Beauty. In 1918 she returned to the Mariinsky, renamed the Petrograd Opera and Ballet Theater after the Russian Revolution of 1917. She was promoted to the rank of ballerina. At this time she was almost unknown in the West.

She continued to perform with the Ballets Russes abroad, dancing "Aurora" in Diaghilev's renowned The Sleeping Princess in London in 1921, and at the Teatro Colón in Buenos Aires in 1923. With the aid of her ex-husband Boris Kaplun, a Bolshevik functionary and lover of the arts, she left Russia for the last time in 1924. She had accepted an invitation to dance as an étoile (prima ballerina) at the Paris Opera Ballet, where she remained until 1932. During that time, she maintained her relationship with the Ballets Russes. In 1932 she made another historic guest appearance in London, dancing Giselle with Anton Dolin of the Royal Ballet. From 1932 to 1937, she toured with a number of companies throughout the world, performing roles from both the classical repertoire and contemporary ballets by choreographers such as Michel Fokine and Bronislava Nijinska. When dancing abroad, she was frequently inaccurately billed as Olga Spessiva.

Spessivtseva had experienced periods of clinical depression as early as 1934, when she showed signs of mental illness in Sydney and needed hospitalisation. In 1937 she left the stage due to a nervous breakdown. She did some teaching, then briefly returned to performing, making her farewell appearance at the Teatro Colón in 1939. That same year, she moved to the United States, where she taught and served as an advisor to the Ballet Theatre Foundation in New York City. She suffered another nervous breakdown in 1943, for which she was hospitalized.

The BBC produced a short programme about her life in 1964, and two years later Anton Dolin wrote a book about her. Both works are titled The Sleeping Ballerina. Expert dance writers have described her as "the greatest of Russian ballerine at this period", and "The supreme classical ballerina of the century".

In 1998, Russian choreographer Boris Eifman made her the heroine of his ballet, Red Giselle.

== See also ==
- List of Russian ballet dancers
- Women in dance

== Sources ==
- Craine, Debra and Mackrell, Judith (2000). The Oxford Dictionary of Dance. New York: Oxford University Press. ISBN 0-19-860106-9.
- Dolin, Anton (1966). The Sleeping Ballerina: The Story of Olga Spessivtzeva, with foreword by Dame Marie Rambert. Muller, London.
- The Great History of Russian Ballet: Its Art and Choreography (1998). Bournemouth, England: Parkstone Publisher; The Great Encyclopedia of Russia Publishing House. ISBN 1-85995-175-9.
- Kahane, Martine [text] and Wild, Nicole [illustrations] (1992). Les Ballets Russes à l’Opéra. Paris: Editions Hazan, Bibliothèque Nationale. ISBN 2-85025-249-2.
- Koegler, Horst (1982). The Concise Oxford Dictionary of Ballet. Second Edition. New York: Oxford University Press. ISBN 0-19-311330-9.
- Kisselgoff, Anna. "A Doomed Russian Ballerina Swept Up by the Revolution." The New York Times. The New York Times, 31 Jan. 1999. Web. 04 June 2017.
- LeMoal, Philippe (1999). Larousse Dictionnaire de la Danse. Paris: Larousse, Librairie de la Danse. ISBN 2-03-511318-0.
- Lifar, Serge (1957). Les trois graces du XX° siècle—Légends et vérités. Paris: Corréa-Buchet Chastel.
- Lifar, Serge (1959). The Three Graces: Anna Pavlova, Tamara Karsavina, Olga Spessivtzeva: The Legends and the Truth. Translated by Gerard Hopkins. London: Cassell & Co.
- Kennedy, Ludovic (1959). The Sleeping Ballerina BBC. Television documentary, including archival footage.
- The Daily Telegraph - Third Book of Obituaries (Entertainers). Edited by Hugh Massingberd
