= The Bandits (ballet) =

1875 ballet by Marius Petipa

Ekaterina Vazem in the Petipa/Minkus Les Brigands, St. Petersburg, 1875

The Bandits (French: Les Brigands) is a grand ballet in two acts and five scenes with prologue, choreographed by Marius Petipa to music by Léon Minkus. The libretto by Marius Petipa is based on Miguel de Cervantes' novella La gitanilla.

The work was first presented by the Imperial Ballet on January 26/February 7 (Julian/Gregorian calendar dates), 1875 at the Imperial Bolshoi Kammeny Theatre in St. Petersburg, Russia.

Principal dancers: Ekaterina Vazem.
