= Zoraiya =

1881 ballet by Marius Petipa

Zoraiya, the Moorish Girl in Spain is a grand ballet in 4 acts/7 scenes, with choreography by Marius Petipa and music by Ludwig Minkus.

The ballet was first presented by the Imperial Ballet on February 1/13 (Julian/Gregorian calendar dates), 1881 at the Imperial Bolshoi Kamenny Theatre in St. Petersburg, Russia.

== Notes ==
- The Grand Pas des toréadors that is used in every modern production of Petipa's Don Quixote is originally from this ballet and it has been widely believed for many years that the piece was interpolated by the Balletmaster Alexander Gorsky into his 1902 restaging of Don Quixote for the Imperial Ballet. However, this is in fact not the case as the Grand Pas des toréadors was already in Don Quixote by the time Gorsky staged his revival because it was found published in the Don Quixote score in 1882. Therefore, the likelihood is that it was actually Petipa himself who interpolated it into Don Quixote.
