= Vera Trefilova =

Russian dancer and teacher

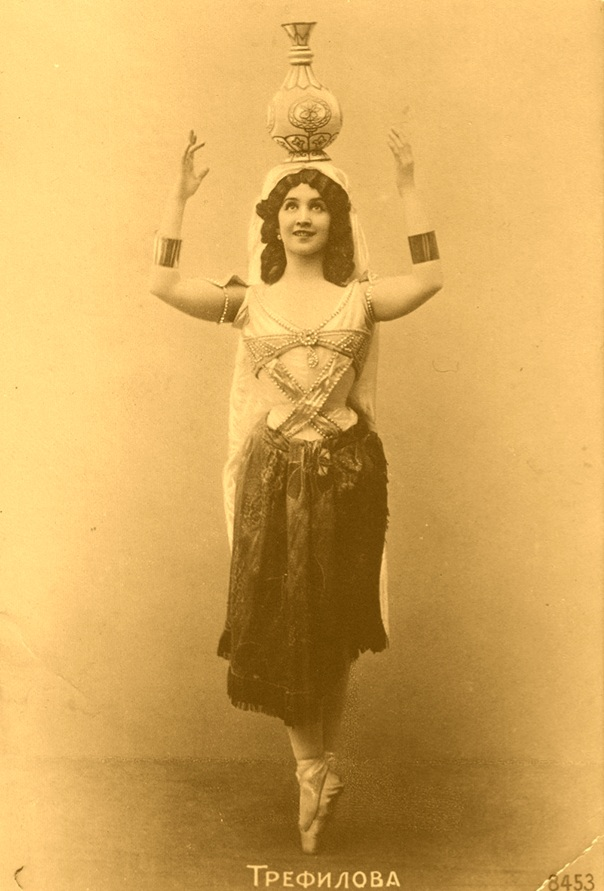
- Vera Trefilova in the Danse Manu from La Bayadère. St. Petersburg, 1900
- Born: Vera Alexandrovna Trefilova; 8 October 1875; Vladikavkaz, Russian Empire
- Died: 11 July 1943 (aged 67); Paris, Occupied France
- Education: Imperial Ballet School
- Occupations: Ballet dancer; teacher
- Organizations: Imperial Ballet; Ballets Russes

Vera Trefilova (Russian: Вера Александровна Трефилова) (Vladikavkaz, 8 Oct. 1875 – Paris, 11 July 1943) was a Russian dancer and teacher.

She studied at the Imperial Ballet School in St Petersburg with Ekaterina Vazem and graduated in 1894. She later studied with Evgenia Sokolova, Nikolai Legat, Catarina Beretta and Enrico Cecchetti. She joined the ballet company at the Maryinsky Theatre in 1894 and was promoted to soloist in 1901. She created roles in Lev Ivanov's Acis and Galatea (1896), N. and S. Legat's The Fairy Doll (1903), N. Legat's The Blood-Red Flower (1907), and Mikhail Fokine's The Night of Terpsichore (1907). In 1906 she was promoted to prima ballerina, known for her 32 fouettés. She triumphed as Princess Aurora in Sleeping Beauty, but resigned in 1910, partly due to her dislike of Fokine's innovations, but above all due to a rivalry with the Maryinsky's reigning ballerina, Mathilde Kschessinska.

In 1915 she made her debut as an actress at the Mikhailovsky Theatre in St. Petersburg.

In 1917 she left Russia and opened a ballet school in Paris: among her pupils were Marina Svetlova, Mary Skeaping, Nina Vyroubova and Mari Bicknell.

Diaghilev invited her to dance Aurora in his 1921 London production of The Sleeping Princess. In 1924, almost 50 years old, she danced Odette-Odile for Diaghilev's Ballets Russes in Monte Carlo, still amazing audiences with her fouetté turns. She gave her final performance at His Majesty's Theatre in London in 1926.

She had three husbands, the third of whom was the dance critic Valerian Svetlov.
