= Russian Serf Theatre =

Russian Serf Theatre refers to theatrical productions performed by serfs for their owners.

Russian serf theaters dates back from the early to mid eighteenth century when the nobility began organizing their serfs to put on shows for each other. In 1795 the Russian population was 37 million, of whom the vast majority were serfs, owned by a mere 360,000 male nobles. The average aristocrat owned just 60 serfs and only 11 per cent owned more than 1000 .

In the late eighteenth century it became popular to employ serfs to mount productions of operas, ballets or plays. More than 2,000 of these slave-artists performed in more than 170 noble theaters and were bought and sold wholesale while at the same time becoming stars. For example, Prince Potemkin bought the whole serf orchestra of Count Kirill Razumovski for 40,000 rubles. As the popularity of drama grew in Russia, competition developed between the nobles as to who could host the most impressive performances.

While the majority of nobles owned less than a thousand serfs, the wealthiest individuals owned many more. Nicholai Sheremetev, for instance, owned 210,000 serfs. His son, Peter Sheremetev, was fascinated by the theater and invested in his company. Upon gaining control of the estate, Peter Sheremetev built a theatre company widely recognized during Russia's golden age of nobility. Sheremetev fell in love with his star singer and actress whose stage name was “Pearl.” In 1801 Count Nicholas Sheremetev, aged 50 and the richest man in Russia, secretly married 32-year-old Praskovia Kovalyova in a ceremony that shocked the Tsar and all of the nation's aristocrats. Sheremetev's love for theatre was exhibited by his long-term relationship with Kovalyova as well as the high professional quality of his theatre. By the early nineteenth century, there 170 serf theatres varying greatly in size and quality.

Serf theatre companies provided the basis of public theatres in several Russian towns.
