= Christian Johansson =

Swedish-Russian ballet teacher (1817–1903)

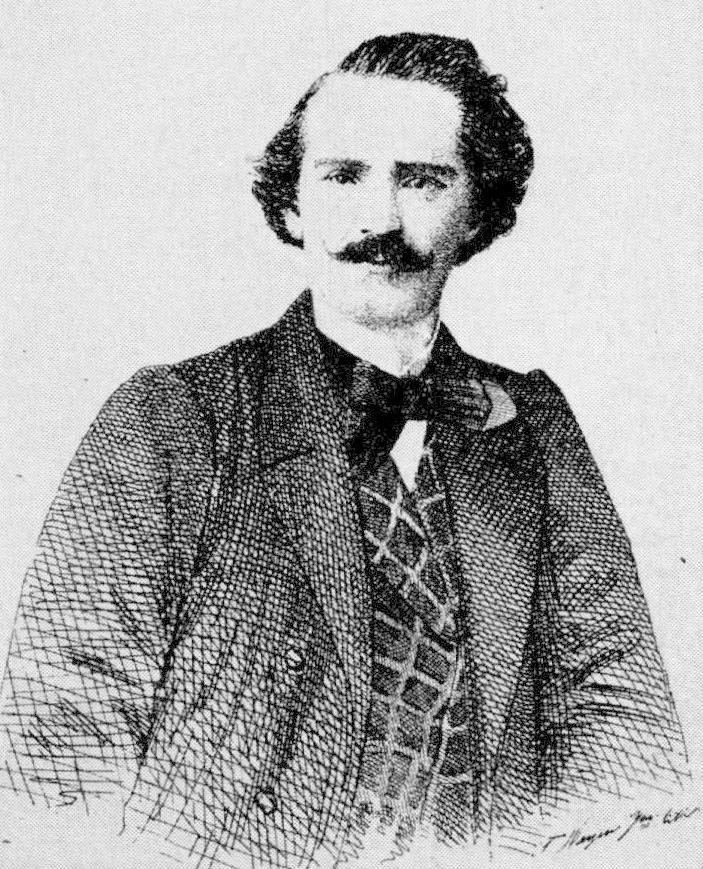
Illustration, 1866

Pehr Christian Johansson (1 June 1817 – 12 December 1903) was a Swedish-born ballet dancer, teacher, choreographer and balletmaster for the Russian Imperial Ballet. He was engaged at the Royal Swedish Ballet from 1829 to 1841, and at the Imperial Russian Ballet from 1841 to 1866.

Born in Stockholm, Sweden, he moved to Russia as a dancer and stayed on as one of the most important teachers in Russian history. He is remembered in Russia as exemplifying the artistic beauty of the male dancer. He began teaching in 1860 and by 1869, had become the leading ballet instructor at the Imperial Ballet School. He stayed there until his death in 1903. Johansson studied under Bournonville and partnered Marie Taglioni.

== Life ==
=== Early life ===
Johansson was born in Stockholm, Sweden on 1 June 1817.

=== Career in Sweden ===
Johansson made his debut on the stage of the Royal Opera House in Stockholm. He became a student of the Royal Swedish Ballet of the Royal Swedish Opera in 1829, and was a premier dancer from 1837 to 1840. During the 1830s, he was referred to as one of the male stars of the ballet alongside Anders Selinder, Vilhelm Pettersson and Carl Wilhelm Silfverberg.

Naturally endowed to be a fine dancer, Crown Prince Oscar financed his studies for the great Danish choreographer August Bournonville. After studying with Bournonville in Copenhagen for two years, Johansson earned the right to be called his pupil and was trained in the French classical style, la belle danse. Beautiful, flexible and graceful in the best tradition of the French school, Johansson attracted the attention of critics. In addition, the great Romantic ballerina, Marie Taglioni, made it a condition of her engagement in Stockholm that Johansson be her partner.

Johansson went on to partner other great ballerinas as well, especially during his time in St. Petersburg. Some of these were Fanny Elssler, Carlotta Grisi, Adèle Grantzow, Yelena Andreyanova, Tatyana Smirnova, Marfa Muravieva, Nadezhda Bogdanova and Fanny Cerrito.

=== Career in Russia ===
His move to Russia in 1841 helped Johansson's career as a dancer. At that time in Europe, the male danseur enjoyed less importance than that of the ballerina. Only in St. Petersburg could a male dancer achieve great success and there perform his own solos, rather than appearing only as a ballerina's partner. This perhaps explains the appearance of the great artistic talents, Marius Petipa, Jules Perrot, Arthur Saint-Leon and Johansson himself, at the Russian Imperial Ballet.

His stage career spanned four decades and included hundreds of ballets. When it ended in 1883, he continued teaching classes at the Imperial Ballet School on Theatre Street in St. Petersburg, something he had done for ten years already. By the end of the 19th century, there was not one ballerina appearing on the stage of the Maryinsky Theatre who had not been taught by Johansson, either at the Imperial Ballet School or at the Theatre's Classe de Perfection.

Tall and thin, with seemingly perfect posture, the aging Johansson would appear in ballet class with a small violin and thick stick. He used this in order to keep the musical beat underneath his mumbled counts of the music. Sometimes the stick was set aside and, instead of his melancholic voice, his violin would sing and enliven the class with simple melodies from the ballets of his youth. This was a novel approach for the relatively severe atmosphere of the school. A calm, well-mannered man, he set an example of graciousness and was admired by the students.

Among his students: his daughter Anna Johansson, Pavel Gerdt, Platon Karsavin, Tamara Karsavina, Nikolai Legat, Sergei Legat, Olga Preobrajenska, Maria Gorshenkova, Mathilde Kschessinska, Evgenia Sokolova, Praskovia Lebedeva, Varvara Nikitina, Agrippina Vaganova, Anna Pavlova, Marie Petipa etc.

=== Legacy ===
Johansson's pupils were not the only ones who were influenced by him. The Imperial Ballet Master, Marius Petipa, would often observe his classes, watching and remembering. After those visits, Johansson would say laughingly, "Once again the old man is stealing something from me..." In truth, Petipa usually sent male dancers to Johansson to have their variations choreographed. Dancers would occasionally recognize their teacher's classroom combinations in Petipa's ballets. It has been substantiated that Johansson himself created and choreographed most of the male variations in the Petipa / Tchaikovsky ballet The Sleeping Beauty (1890).

Christian Johansson's daughter, the ballerina Anna Christianovna Johansson (1860-1917), was a celebrated soloist of the St. Petersburg Imperial Ballet and created roles in nearly every important premiere throughout the late nineteenth century. Among the roles she created were: the fairy Canari que chant and the Diamond Fairy in the Pas de Quatre of the Precious Stones from Petipa's The Sleeping Beauty (1890), Aurora, goddess of the dawn in Petipa's The Awakening of Flora (1894), and the lead ballerina of the Waltz of the Flowers in the premiere of The Nutcracker (1892).

== Sources ==
- "Иогансон, Христиан Петрович" . Brockhaus and Efron Encyclopedic Dictionary (in Russian). 1906.
- Fredrik August Dahlgren: Förteckning öfver svenska skådespel uppförda på Stockholms theatrar 1737-1863 och Kongl. Theatrarnes personal 1773-1863. Med flera anteckningar.
- Nils Personne: Svenska teatern : några anteckningar 7. Under Karl Johanstiden : 1835-1838
- https://sok.riksarkivet.se/sbl/Presentation.aspx?id=12134
