= List of 1870s ballet premieres =

This is a list of ballet premieres in the 1870s, by year.

== 1870 ==
title	choreographer	composer	company	venue	date
Coppélia	Arthur Saint-Léon	Léo Delibes	Paris Opera Ballet	Théâtre Impérial de l´Opéra	May 25
Trilby	Marius Petipa	Yuli Gerber	Ballet of the Moscow Imperial Bolshoi Theatre	Imperial Bolshoi Kamenny Theatre	January 25/February 6

== 1871 ==
title	choreographer	composer	company	venue	date
The Two Stars	Marius Petipa	Cesare Pugni	Imperial Ballet	Imperial Bolshoi Kamenny Theatre	January 31/February 6

== 1872 ==
title	choreographer	composer	company	venue	date
Camargo	Marius Petipa	Ludwig Minkus	Imperial Ballet	Imperial Bolshoi Kamenny Theatre	December 7/19

== 1875 ==
title	choreographer	composer	company	venue	date
Ballet égyptien		Alexandre Luigini			
The Bandits	Marius Petipa	Léon Minkus	Imperial Ballet	Imperial Bolshoi Kamenny Theatre	January 26/February 7

== 1876 ==
title	choreographer	composer	company	venue	date
Les Aventures de Pélée	Marius Petipa	Ludwig Minkus	Imperial Ballet	Imperial Bolshoi Kamenny Theatre	January 18/30
Dance of the Hours					
Sylvia	Louis Mérante	Léo Delibes		Palais Garnier	June 14

== 1877 ==
title	choreographer	composer	company	venue	date
La Bayadère	Marius Petipa	Ludwig Minkus	Imperial Ballet	Imperial Bolshoi Kamenny Theatre	February 4/January 23
Swan Lake	Julius Reisinger	Pyotr Ilyich Tchaikovsky	Bolshoi Ballet	Bolshoi Theatre	March 4/February 20

== 1879 ==
title	choreographer	composer	company	venue	date
The Daughter of the Snows	Marius Petipa	Ludwig Minkus	Imperial Ballet	Imperial Bolshoi Kamenny Theatre	January 7
Frizak the Barber	Marius Petipa	Ludwig Minkus	Imperial Ballet	Imperial Bolshoi Kamenny Theatre	March 11/23
Mlada	Marius Petipa	Ludwig Minkus	Imperial Ballet	Imperial Bolshoi Kamenny Theatre	December 2/14
Roxana, the Beauty of Montenegro	Marius Petipa	Ludwig Minkus	Imperial Ballet	Imperial Bolshoi Kamenny Theatre	January 29/February 11
