= Florida (ballet) =

1866 ballet by Marius Petipa

Florida is a ballet in three acts and five scenes, with libretto and choreography by Marius Petipa and music by Cesare Pugni. The work was first presented by the Imperial Ballet at the Imperial Bolshoi Kamenny Theatre on January 10/22 (Julian/Gregorian calendar dates), 1866, in St. Petersburg, Russia, with Mariia Surovshchikova-Petipa as Florida.

John Philip Sousa included a suite from Pugni's score for Florida in his band's repertory, as well as the Grand Ballet Suite from Pugni's score for Petipa's The Pharaoh's Daughter.

== See also ==
- List of ballets by title
