= A Marriage During the Regency =

1858 ballet by Marius Petipa

A Marriage During the Regency (French: Un Mariage sous la Régence, Russian: Брак во времена регентства) is a ballet in 2 acts, with libretto and choreography by Marius Petipa and music by Cesare Pugni.

The ballet was first presented by the Imperial Ballet on December 18/30 (Julian/Gregorian calendar dates), 1858, at the Imperial Bolshoi Kamenny Theatre in St. Petersburg, Russia. Principal dancers: Mariia Surovshchikova-Petipa (as the Countess Matilda) and Christian Johansson (as the Count), Timofei Stukolkin, Marfa Muravyova, Anna Prikhunova, and Lev Ivanov.

In 1870 Marius Petipa restaged this ballet at the Mariinsky Theatre.
