= The Parisian Market or Le Marché des Innocents =

1859 comic ballet by Marius Petipa and Cesare Pugni

The Parisian Market (aka Le Marché des parisien or Les Marché des Innocents) is a comic ballet in one act, with libretto and choreography by Marius Petipa and music by Cesare Pugni.

First presented by the Imperial Ballet under the title Le Marché des parisien on 5 May [O.S. 23 April] 1859 at the Imperial Bolshoi Kamenny Theatre in St. Petersburg, Russia. Principal dancers: Mariia Surovshchikova-Petipa (as Lizetta), Marius Petipa (as Simon), and Timofei Stukolkin (as the Marquis Megrèle).

== Revivals/Restagings ==
- Restaged by Marius Petipa for the Ballet of the Académie Royale de Musique, (AKA The Paris Opera) under the title Les Marché des Innocents. First presented on 29 May 1861. For this production Petipa changed the names of the characters Lizetta and Marquis Megrèle to Gloriette and Lindor. Principal Dancers - Mariia Surovshchikova-Petipa (as Gloriette), and Louis Mérante (as Lindor).
- Revival by Lev Ivanov for the Imperial Ballet. First presented for the Imperial court at the theatre of Krasnoe Selo, St. Petersburg, on July 6–18, 1892.
- Revival by Marius Petipa for the Imperial Ballet. First presented at the Imperial Mariinsky Theatre, St. Petersburg, on January 8–20, 1895. Principal Dancers - Maria Anderson (as Lizetta), Sergei Litavkin (as Simon), Enrico Cecchetti (as the Marquis Megrèle)

== Sources ==
- Marius Petipa Society: The Parisian Market
