= The Traveling Dancer =

1849 ballet by Marius Petipa

La Prima Ballerina, ou L'embuscade or The Traveling Dancer (aka La Danseuse en voyage) is a ballet (choreographic episode) in one act, with choreography by Marius Petipa, music by Cesare Pugni and libretto by Paul Taglioni. It was based on a ballet created by Paul Taglioni for the Ballet of Her Majesty's Theatre, London first presented on June 14, 1849.

It was first presented by the Imperial Ballet on November April 16, 1864 (Julian/Gregorian calendar dates), at the Imperial Bolshoi Kamenny Theatre, St. Petersburg, Russia. The principal Dancers were Mariia Surovshchikova-Petipa as the Prima Ballerina, and Timofei Stukolkin as Rinaldo.

A variation from this ballet—composed by Petipa in 1905 for the Prima Ballerina Olga Preobrajenskaya—was the last choreography Petipa ever created (as noted in his Diaries).

Lev Ivanov produced a revival for the Imperial Ballet, with the composer/conductor Riccardo Drigo editing and making additions to Cesare Pugni's original score. First presented on July 26/August 7 (Julian/Gregorian calendar dates), 1893 for the Imperial court at the theatre of Krasnoe Selo. St. Petersburg, Russia.

== See also ==
- List of ballets by title
