= La fille du Danube =

Ballet in two acts and four scenes

La Fille du Danube (The Daughter of the Danube) is a ballet in two acts and four scenes, choreographed by Filippo Taglioni to music by Adolphe Adam.

Marie Taglioni as the Daughter of the Danube (circa. 1836)

== History ==
La Fille du Danube was choreographed and produced by Filippo Taglioni for his daughter, Marie Taglioni, the creator of the title role and was premièred on 21 September 1836 by the ballet of the Académie Royale de Musique, Paris. Like his 1832 ballet La Sylphide, La Fille du Danube focused on the romantic theme of a supernatural maiden, but with both inhibiting a different element - the Sylph is a maiden of the air, while the Daughter of the Danube is a maiden of the water.

The following year in 1837, Taglioni and his daughter travelled to St Petersburg, Russia where Marie Taglioni made her Russian debut in La Sylphide on the 6 September 1837 at the Imperial Bolshoi Kammeny Theatre. Her St Petersburg debut was a huge success, with the Russian balletomanes and critics becoming completely enchanted by the Italian ballerina. That same year, her father revived and restaged La Fille du Danube for Marie's benefit performance on the 20 December 1837 and the revival was a tremendous success. One critic wrote:

The ballet presented yesterday, La Fille du Danube, had a marvellous success. The balletmaster Mr Taglioni, the creator of the ballet, who produced it on our stage, was called for after the first and second acts. Mlle Taglioni was never so captivating as on this evening. The calls for her were endless; we lost count of them.

Marie Taglioni performed in La Fille du Danube for the final time in St Petersburg in 1842, a week before her final performance in Russia.

La Fille du Danube was to be one of the two ballets by Filippo Taglioni to survive in Russia following the departures of both the balletmaster and his daughter from the country, the other being La Sylphide. In 1880, at the request of Tsar Alexander II, who had seen Marie Taglioni in the ballet, La Fille du Danube was revived by Marius Petipa for the Prima Ballerina, Ekaterina Vazem. For this revival, Petipa included new musical additions and revisions by Léon Minkus and the revival was premièred at the Imperial Bolshoi Kammeny Theatre on 24 February 1880 for Vazem's benefit performance. Vazem writes in her memoirs how she felt that the ballet was "flat", that the heroine's part was "not the most effective" and goes onto claim that "the mounting of the ballet looked quite wretched". However, she also writes that the premiere was met with much enthusiasm from the public:

For all the minuses of this production, however, the public, perhaps fascinated by the legend of the furore which Taglioni created in La Fille du Danube, came to the theatre in throngs.
