= The Blue Dahlia (ballet) =

1860 ballet by Marius Petipa

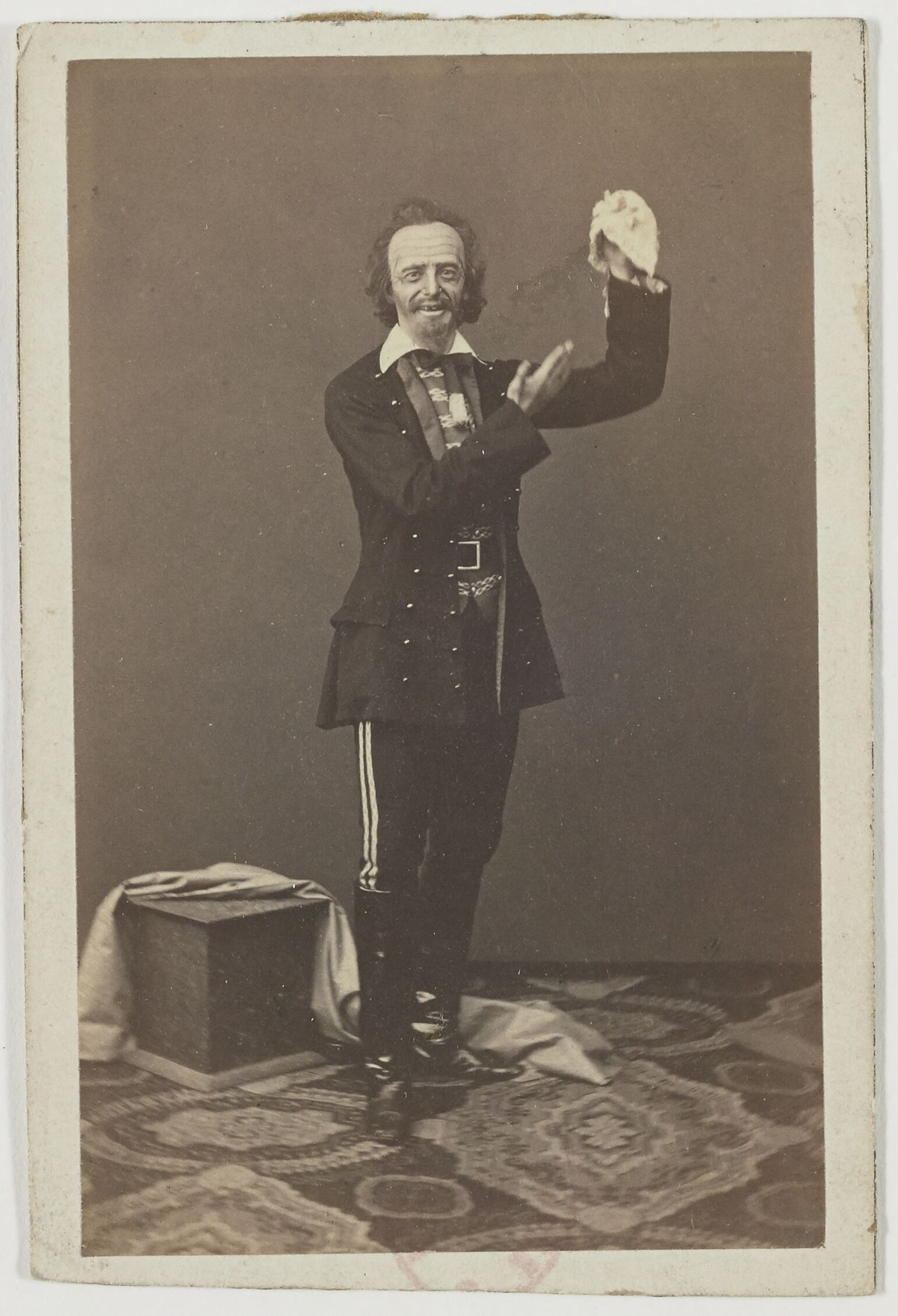
Timofei Stukolkin as Beausoleil

The Blue Dahlia (French: Le Dahlia bleu) is a ballet in two acts, with libretto and choreography by Marius Petipa and music by Cesare Pugni, first presented by the Imperial Ballet on 12 May [O.S. 30 April] 1860 at the Imperial Bolshoi Kamenny Theatre in St. Petersburg, Russia, with Mariia Surovshchikova-Petipa (as the Blue Dahlia) and Timofei Stukolkin (as Beausoleil).

Marius Petipa renewed the first act of this ballet in 1875 for a debut of his daughter, Marie Petipa.

== Revivals ==
The ballet was revived by Pavel Gerdt for the Imperial Ballet and presented at the Imperial Mariinsky Theatre, St. Petersburg on March 5–18, 1905 with Lubov Egorova (as the Blue Dahlia). Petipa disliked Gerdt's 1905 revival to such a degree that he requested his name be removed from the program.

== See also ==
- List of ballets by title
