= Timofei Stukolkin =

Russian ballet dancer (1829–1894)

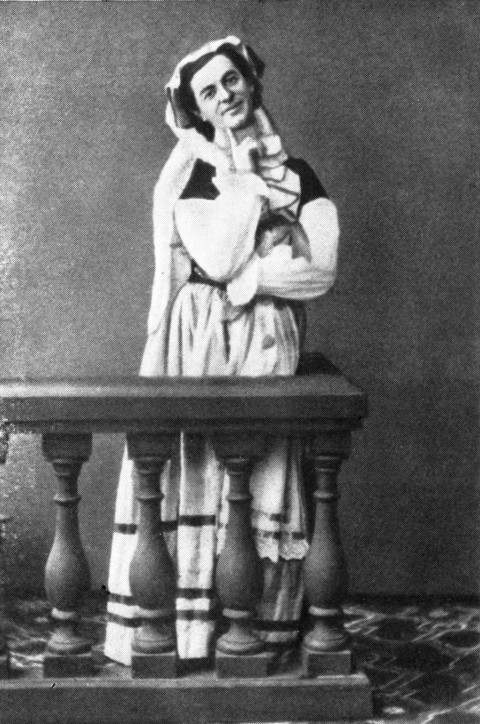
Timofei Stukolkin as Marceline in La fille mal gardée

Timofei Alekseyevich Stukolkin (Russian: Тимофей Алексеевич Стуколкин; 6 May [O.S. 24 April] 1829, the village Kozmino of Simbirsk province - 30 September [O.S. 18 September] 1894, Saint Petersburg) was a Russian ballet dancer.

Oxford Dictionary of Dance called him "one of the greatest character dancers".

Timofei Stukolkin came from a very poor family. For seven years, he played in a pantomime on a fairground. Someone once drew attention to the talented boy and brought him into the theatre school at the Imperial theaters of Petersburg. In 1836 Timofei Stukolkin was accepted at the ballet department of Imperial theatre college. His teachers were French dancers working in Russia: Emile Gredlu (ru: Эмиль Гредлю), Pierre Frédéric Malavergne, Charles Lachouque (ru: Шарль Лашук) and Jean-Antoine Petipa.

He graduated in 1848 and was accepted by the Imperial troupe of St. Petersburg. He showed the talent of the psychological and grotesque roles.

In addition to the ballet performances he often appeared in dramatic roles - comedies and farces. He always enjoyed great success. He wrote for himself short humorous monologues and often played them in concerts, simultaneously with dancing. Timofei Stukolkin was one of the most beloved actors of Saint-Petersburg.

Since 1854, continuing artistic activities at the St Petersburg Imperial troupe, he began to teach the dances in different schools.

Among his ballet roles:

- Peter — Faust, choreography by Jules Perrot
- 1858 — A Marriage During the Regency
- 1858 — Bertram — Robert and Bertram
- 1859 — Marquis Megrèle — The Parisian Market or Le Marché des Innocents
- 1860 — Ignas — Pâquerette
- 1860 — Beausoleil — The Blue Dahlia
- 1863 — Beshir — The Beauty of Lebanon or The Mountain Spirit
- 1862 — John Bull — The Pharaoh's Daughter
- 1864 or 1865 — Rinaldo — The Traveling Dancer (to benefit of Nikolay Goltz (ru: Николай Осипович Гольц))
- 1866 — Taras — Le Poisson doré
- 1867 — Mephistophelis — Faust, revival by Marius Petipa (choreography by Jules Perrot)
- Nikez (Alain) and Marceline (Widow Simone) — La fille mal gardée
- 1871 — Don Quixote — Don Quixote
- 1872 — Comte de Melun — Camargo
- after 1865 — Ivanushka — The Little Humpbacked Horse (because of a broken leg was replaced by Nilolay Troitsky)
- 1884 — Dr Coppelius — Coppélia
- 1892 — Drosselmeyer — The Nutcracker

Timofei Stukolkin began to write memoirs at the end of life. He wrote about the theater life, about the student's, about a very hard life of children in the theater school. These memoirs were published shortly in 1895 after his death.

Timofei Stukolkin died suddenly of a heart attack after the second act of the ballet Coppélia. Dancers quickly finished third act without him.
