= Pygmalion, ou La Statue de Chypre =

1883 ballet by Marius Petipa

Pygmalion, ou La Statue de Chypre (a.k.a. Pygmalion, or The Cyprus Statue) is a ballet in 4 Acts and 6 Scenes, with choreography by Marius Petipa and music by Prince Nikita Trubestkoi.

First presented by the Imperial Ballet on 23 December [O.S. 11 December] 1883 at the Imperial Bolshoi Kamenny Theatre in St. Petersburg, Russia. It was revived in 1895, featuring Pierina Legnani.
