= Mlada (ballet) =

1879 ballet by Marius Petipa

Mlada is a ballet in 4 Acts/9 Scenes, with choreography by Marius Petipa, and music by Ludwig Minkus.

The ballet was first presented by the Imperial Ballet on December 2/14 (Julian/Gregorian calendar dates), 1879 at the Imperial Bolshoi Kamenny Theatre in St. Petersburg, Russia. Principal dancers: Eugeniia Sokolova (as Mlada), Felix Kschessinsky (as Mstivoi, Prince Ratarskii), and Mariia Gorsjenkova (as Princess Voislava).

== Revivals and restagings ==
Revival by Marius Petipa for the Imperial Ballet in 4 Acts/6 Scenes. First presented on September 25/October 7, 1896 at the Imperial Mariinsky Theatre. Principal dancers: Mathilde Kschessinskaya (as Mlada), Felix Kschessinsky (as Mstivoi, Prince Rataskii), Marie Petipa (as Princess Voislava), Pavel Gerdt (as Iaromir, Prince Arkonskii), Nadezhda Petipa (as Sviatokhna), and Alexander Shiraev (as the Jester).

== Notes ==
In the 1870's the composers César Cui, Nikolai Rimsky-Korsakov, Modest Mussorgsky, and Alexander Borodin, known as "The Mighty Handful", had intended to produce an opera based on the same libretto and under the same title for premiere in 1872, with Minkus scoring the music for the ballet sections. However the project was aborted, even though the music had been, for the most part, completed, and most of the composers who contributed to the score re-used their music for later works. When scoring the music for Petipa's 1879 ballet adaptation, Minkus utilized the music he had scored for the aborted project.
