= Bluebeard (ballet) =

1896 ballet by Marius Petipa

Barbe-bleue
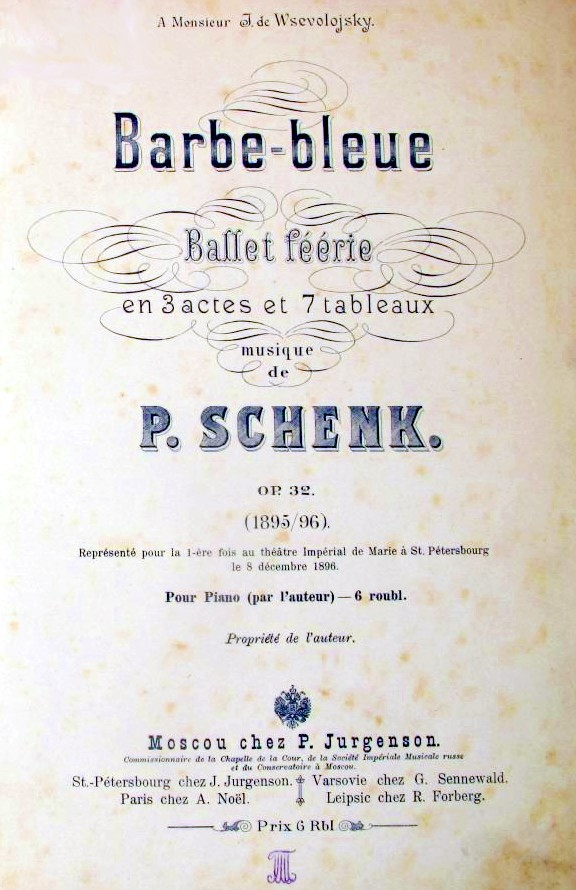
- Frontispiece of the piano reduction of Pyotr Schenk's score for Marius Petipa's grand ballet Barbe-bleue as issued by the music publisher P. Jurgenson
- Choreographer: Marius Petipa
- Music: Pyotr Schenk
- Libretto: Lydia Pashkova
- Based on: Charles Perrault's Bluebeard
- Premiere: December 20 [O.S. December 8] 1896; Imperial Mariinsky Theatre, St. Petersburg
- Design: Pyotr Lambin (act I) Konstantin Ivanov (act II/scene 1, act III/scene 1) Heinrich Levogt (act II/scenes 2, 3 & 4) Vassily Perminov & Konstantin Ivanov (act III/scene 2 & apotheosis)
- Created for: Benefit performance of Marius Petipa, in honor of his 50th anniversary in service to the St. Petersburg Imperial Theatres
- Type: Ballet-féerie

Barbe-bleue (lit. 'Bluebeard'; Russian: Синяя борода, romanized: Sinyaya boroda) is a ballet-féerie in three acts and seven scenes, originally choreographed by Marius Petipa to the music of Pyotr Schenk. The libretto was created by the author and dramatist Countess Lydia Pashkova from the fairy tale Bluebeard by Charles Perrault. The ballet was first presented by the Imperial Ballet on December 20 [O.S. December 8] 1896 at the Imperial Mariinsky Theatre in St. Petersburg, Russia, the first performance being a benefit in honor of Marius Petipa's fiftieth anniversary in service to the St. Petersburg Imperial Theatres.

== Roles and original cast ==
Role	Dancer
Bluebeard	Pavel Gerdt
Ysaure de Renoualle	Pierina Legnani
Arthur	Sergei Legat
Anne de Renoualle	Olga Preobrajenska
Ebremard de Renoualle	Josef Kschessinsky
Raymond de Renoualle	Alexander Oblakov
Ysaure's friend	Claudia Kulichevskaya
The Knight	Nikolai Aistov
The Spirit of Curiosity	Olga Leonova
Venus	Mathilde Kschessinskaya

== History ==
Marius Petipa created the ballet Bluebeard for his own benefit performance given in honor of his 50th anniversary of service to the St. Petersburg Imperial Theatres. The ballet was given a lavish production of the most sumptuous costumes and décor, with the Mariinsky Theatre's machinists creating complex and rapid stage metamorphoses. Many critics who attended the ballet's premier complained that Bluebeard sacrificed plot and artistic sensibilities in favor of spectacle, with the libretto merely serving as an excuse for elaborate stage transformations and even more elaborate dances. Nevertheless, Petipa's dances for Bluebeard were universally hailed as masterworks of classical choreography. The critic from the St. Petersburg Gazette commented on the danced numbers in Bluebeard:

...even in his 70's, (Petipa) still demonstrates endless imagination, variety and taste, with his work for the corps de ballet and the staging of classical variations being masterfully executed. This year Petipa celebrates his 50th year of service to our theatre, demonstrating once again that he has no rival in all Europe.

Although Bluebeard was very successful during its opening run, the ballet did not find a permanent place in the repertory of the Imperial Ballet. The last presentation of the full-length production of Bluebeard was given in 1899 for the benefit performance of Pierina Legnani. In 1901, the first and third acts of the ballet were given as part of a program staged for the farewell benefit of Legnani before retiring to her native Italy.

A revival of Bluebeard was mounted for the Imperial Ballet in 1910 by the premier danseur and pedagogue Nikolai Legat. As with the ballet's original inception in 1896, the first performances of Legat's revival of Bluebeard were successful. Nevertheless, the large cast the ballet required and in particular the complex stage effects were impossible to produce by the outset of World War I in 1914. The full-length Bluebeard was performed for the last time in 1913. Excerpts from the ballet were given sporadically in galas and benefit performances until 1916, when the ballerina Elsa Vill and the danseur Fyodor Lophukov were featured in a performance of Petipa's celebrated Pas de deux éléctrique.

In 2009, the Russian choreographers Yuri Burlaka and Vasily Medvedev utilized pieces from Pyotr Schenk's score for Bluebeard in their revival of La Esmeralda for the Bolshoi Ballet, with the music accompanying a new Grand pas des fleurs in the second act.

In 2014, Vasily Medvedev staged a new version of the Grand Pas de deux électrique from Bluebeard as the Grand pas électrique for the Dance Open Festival Gala at the Alexandrinsky Theatre in St. Petersburg. The performance featured Kristina Kretova and Semyon Chudin from the Bolshoi Ballet in the leads and framed by four couples.

== Résumé of scenes and dances ==
Taken from the piano reduction of Pyotr Schenk's score as issued by the publisher P. Jurgenson.

Act I, Scene 1

- Introduction
- No. 01 Scène d'Arthur et des pages
- No. 02 L'aubade
- No. 03 Scène d'amour (Solo de violon pour Mons. Léopold Auer)
- No. 04 Danse des pages
- No. 05 Scène des frères de Ysaure
- No. 06 Marche et scène de la retinue de Barbe-Bleue
- No. 07 Danse des enfants du village
- No. 08 Pas d'action: Le concours des prix pour la danse—

—a. Andante
—b. Variation (Vivace)
—c. Variation (Tempo di valse)
—d. Variation (Quasi orientale)
—e. Variation (Pizzicato)
—f. Coda

- No. 09 Distribution des prix et Paysannerie normande
- No. 10 Grand pas d'action—

—a. Adage (solo de la violoncelle pour Mons. Nikolai Galkin)
—b. Variation (Moderato)
—c. Variation (Tempo di mazurka)
—d. Variation (Tempo di valse)
—e. Variation (Vivace)
—f. Coda-valse

- No. 11 Final

Act II, Scene 1

- No. 12 Introduction et scène de la toilette d'Ysaure de Renoualle
- No. 13 "L'angélique": Canzonetta d'Arthur sur le luth (Solo de la harpe pour Mons. Albert Zabel)
- No. 14 Passepied
- No. 15 Scène dansante: Le coquetterie devant le miroir
- No. 16 Entrée de Barbe-bleue et scène d'amour
- No. 17 Scène du chevalier
- No. 18 Scène des clefs
- No. 19 Départ de Barbe-bleue
- No. 20 L'apparition et scène de l'Esprit de Curiosité
- No. 21 Premier panorama

Act II, Scene 2

- No. 22 Le caveau de l'argenterie
- No. 23 Bacchanale
- No. 24 Deuxième panorama

Act II, Scene 3

- No. 25 Pas oriental—

—a. Adage japonais
—b. Danse hindoue
—c. Variation orientale
—d. Coda orientale

- No. 26 Troisième panorama

Act II, Scene 4

- No. 27 Pas des pierres précieuses—

—a. Scène et valse
—b. Entrées des rubis, des émeraudes, des saphirs et des diamants
—c. Variation diamantée
—d. Valse des pierres précieuses

- No. 28 Final

Act III, Scene 1

- No. 29 Scène dramatique: "Sœur Anne, ne vois-tu rien venir?"

Act III, Scene 2

- No. 30 Grand polonaise
- No. 31 Divertissement astrologique—

—a. Entrée des astrologues
—b. Danse astronomiques
—c. Groupes et constellations
—d. Danse des étoiles
—e. Variation de Vénus
—f. Valse des étoiles

Le temps passé

- No. 32 Évocation et la Gaillarde
- No. 33 La Monaco

Le temps présent

- No. 34 Évocation et polka fin de siècle

Le temps futur

- No. 35 Évocation du futur
- No. 36 Grand pas de deux électrique—

—a. Adage
—b. Variation du Premier danseur: Mons. Sergei Legat
—c. Variation de la Première danseuse: Mlle. Pierina Legnani
—d. Coda

- No. 37 Danse générale: Le cotillon
- No. 38 Apothéose

== Gallery ==
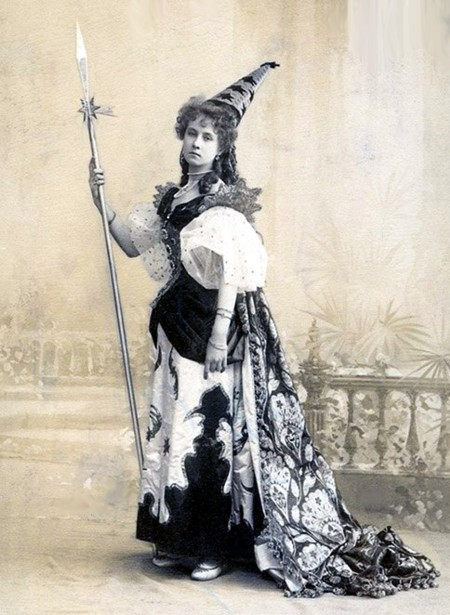
Olga Leonova costumed as the Spirit of Curiosity.

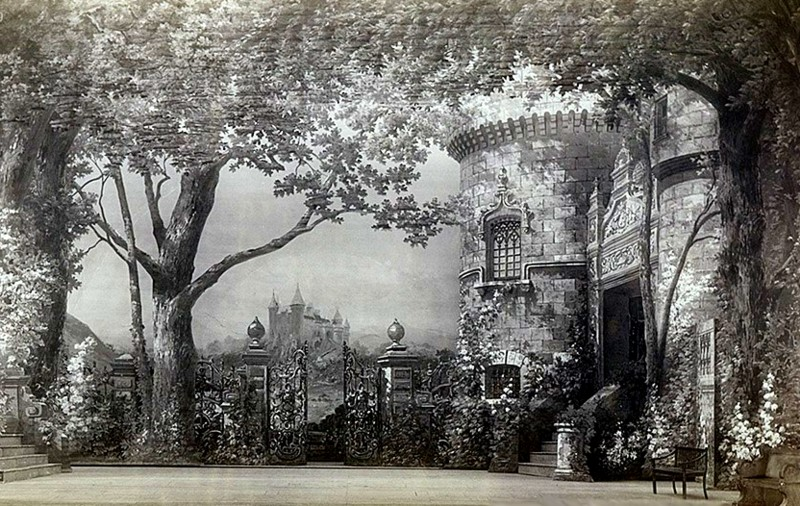
The stage of the Imperial Mariinsky Theatre dressed in Pyotr Lambin's décor for act I.

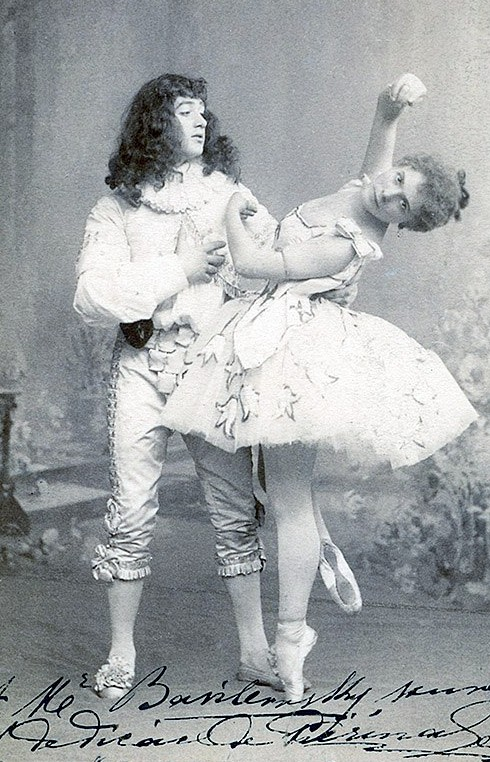
Sergei Legat as Arthur and Pierina Legnani as Ysaure de Renoualle in their costumes for act I.

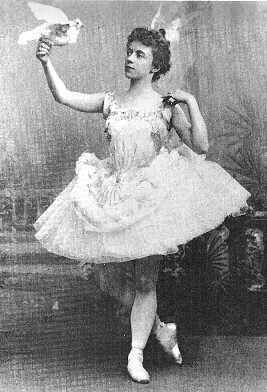
Olga Preobrajenskaya costumed for act III as the Goddess Venus.

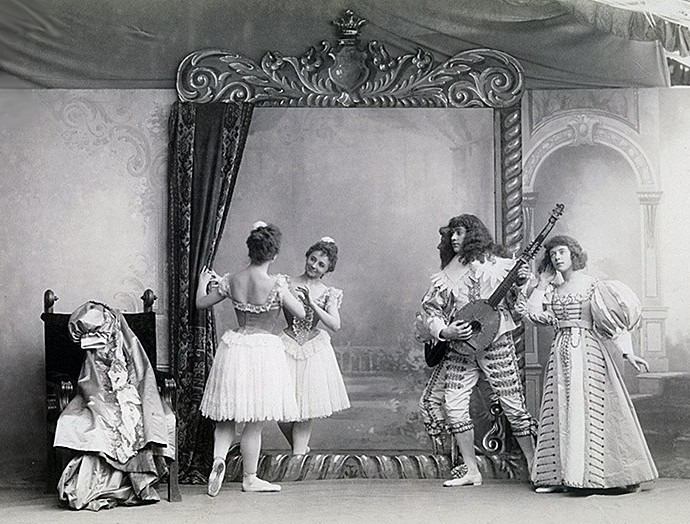
The Scène dansante: Le coquetterie devant le miroir from act II/scene 1. Pictured, from left to right, is Pierina Legnani as Ysaure de Renoualle (with back turned), Claudia Kulichevskaya as her friend, Sergei Legat as Arthur, and Olga Preobrajenskaya as Anne de Renoualle.

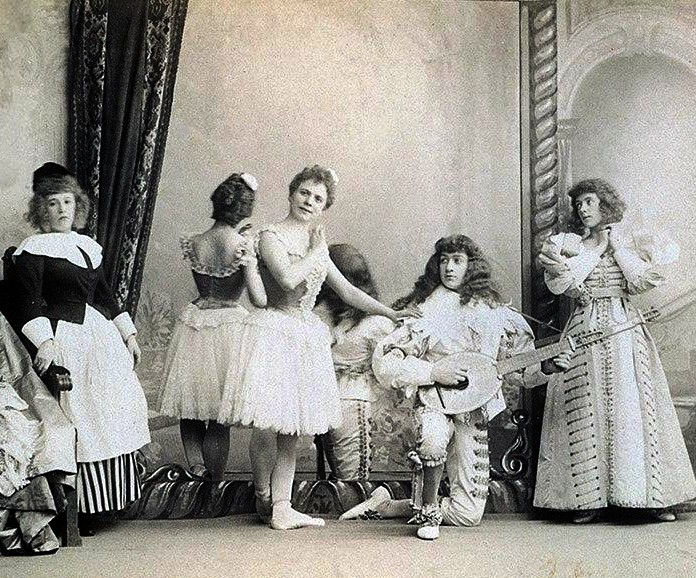
Another image of cast members from act II/scene 1. From left to right: an unknown cast member as a servant, Pierina Legnani as Ysaure de Renoualle, Sergei Legat as Arthur, and Olga Preobrajenskaya as Anne de Renoualle.

== Libretto ==
Act I

A garden in front of the castle owned by the De Renounalle family

To the left, the castle with machicolated towers and a large window and door leading on to the terrace. In the depths of the garden is an elaborate gate and railing, through which can be seen a beautiful landscape dominated by Bluebeard's cast. It is a morning in early spring

Arthur, a page, who is in love with Ysaure de Renoualle, steals into the castle belonging to her brothers. Having made certain that he has entered unobserved, he signs to his fellow pages, who creep in masked and bearing musical instruments. Under Arthur's direction, they prepare to serenade Ysaure.

During the serenade, Ysaure appears; she listens with pleasure to the music. Arthur entreats her to descend. She agrees and the lovers embrace. Meanwhile, her brothers, Raymond and Ebremard, watch the proceedings from the shelter of a gallery. A dance is formed in which the lovers take part and at this point, the brothers enter and the merriment abruptly ceases. They order Arthur to unmask. The page and his friends remove their masks. Arthur tells the brothers that he is passionately in love with Ysaure and asks for her hand. They point out his poverty and the stupidity of his request. Arthur admits his lack of wealth, but continues to urge his love, which only arouses the brothers' laughter. Raymond and Ebremard go to their sister and inform her that Bluebeard, a wealthy neighbor, is a suitor for her hand; they counsel her to accept him. Ysaure is filled with grief, but accedes to her brothers' wishes and enters the castle to prepare for her suitor's visit.

Trumpets are heard and the Major-domo announces the arrival of an important visitor. Through the garden gates winds a magnificent procession, which includes the sad-faced Arthur and finally, Bluebeard himself. The brothers accord him every honor, while Ysaure descends the steps and offers him a cup of wine. Bluebeard asks Ysaure for her hand. She hesitates, then consents. Arthur cannot disguise his sorrow. Bluebeard offers Ysaure his arm and together they mount the terrace, where members of his retinue are presented to her. The betrothal is celebrated by a succession of dances.

Ysaure is delighted to see Arthur among the dancers and they exchange words of love. Ysaure's brothers, seeing her happy mood, attribute it to her pleasure in the match they have made. Bluebeard gazes passionately at his fiancée so that Arthur's jealousy is aroused, but he is helpless. When the dances finally end, Ysaure's ladies bring in a wedding gown in which they clothes their mistress, who then takes her place in a litter, which is borne in procession for the wedding ceremony. Arthur, left alone, gives way to tears.

Bluebeard and Ysaure return and the married couple, attended by their retinue, go towards the former's castle. Arthur wishes to offer Ysaure a flower, but her sister stays his hand. As the unhappy page bestows a farewell glance on his beloved, the curtain falls.

Act II

Scene 1 - Ysaure's Chamber

The rear wall is adorned with a large mirror screened by a curtain. To the left is a rich four-poster bed with hangings. To the right, a couch. Ysaure is making her toilette, while her ladies offer her flowers and other articles of adornment. Arthur entertains Ysaure by playing on lute

Anne and Arthur dance a passepied. Then Ysaure orders the curtain to be drawn and she dances in front of the mirror. Footsteps announce the approach of Bluebeard who, entering the room, hurries to his wife. Meanwhile, Anne and Arthur withdraw. While Bluebeard converses with Ysaure, Arthur enters and announces that a knight desires an audience with him. Surprised and annoyed, Bluebeard consents to receive him. The knight enters and, having delivered a warlike message from his lord, flings his gauntlet. Bluebeard picks up the gage and accepts the challenge. The knight departs.

Bluebeard tells his wife that he must set out on a military expedition, but promises soon to return. Ysaure expresses her sorrow, but is secretly delighted at the thought of his departure. He bids her not to languish in his absence, but to amuse herself with games and dances. He also gives her a collection of keys fashioned of various metals, which afford access to his underground treasure-chambers. She may use all these keys save one, which is made of iron, and if she disobeys him in that respect, he warns her of his severe displeasure. Distant horns are heard. Bluebeard's retainers enter with a suit of armor, which they buckle on their lord. Ysaure passes her scarf over his shoulders. He kisses her and departs. Ysaure, left alone, is all eagerness to try the keys, especially the forbidden one. In the distance can be heard the fading tones of a military march.

Ysaure is now visited by the Spirit of Curiosity, who tries to make Ysaure follow her underground. With a golden key the Spirit of Curiosity opens a door on the left and descends the stairs.

Scene 2 - The First Underground Chamber

The walls are lined with glittering vessels of gold and silver; there are gold candelabras with candles and caryatides bearing baskets of flowers on their heads

The Spirit of Curiosity leads Ysaure through the right-hand door into the chamber. Ysaure is amazed at the treasures it contains. Suddenly, the caryatids become alive and the candles burst into flame. The gold and silver vessels become animated and cause a vast clanging as they jostle together. At the conclusion of their dance, Ysaure opens another door with a silver key.

Scene 3 - The Second Underground Chamber

"Here the walls are covered with wonderful materials of all shapes and sizes and from every country."

All these precious things come to life. There is a Japanese dance with a fan, a Hindu dance, an Eastern variation, a coda and a final ensemble. Then Ysaure opens the left-hand door with a diamond key.

Scene 4 - The Third Underground Chamber

Ysaure, urged on by the Spirit of Curiosity, enters from the right. The room is in semi-darkness, but gradually, it lightens and is seen to contain heaps of precious stones, which come to life and begin to dance. First, there is a waltz by Diamonds, then a dance by Emeralds, Colored Diamonds, Rubies and Sapphires. Next follows a variation and finally comes another waltz where the Jewels disappear and complete darkness ensues.

Ysaure notices another secret door, which is heavily barred. The Spirit of Curiosity urges to insert the iron key to open this door. At the Spirit's suggestion, Ysaure goes half-eagerly, half-fearfully towards the door. With trembling hands, she slips the key in the lock and turns it. Then she takes a candle and, lighting it, moves towards the chamber, which is seen to contain the bodies of Bluebeard's numerous wives, whom he killed as a punishment for their disobedience. Horrified, Ysaure drops the candle and falls senseless on the threshold.

Act III

Scene 1 - The Terrace of Bluebeard's Castle

To the right, a large tower with steps leading to the top of it. The castle entrance has an iron sconce, to the left is a low stone wall. On the right, a fountain with a stone basin

Ysaure, pale and distraught, comes out of the castle. She calls her sister, Anne and tells her of her discovery behind the fateful door. "Look!" she cries, holding up the key, "it fell into some blood and I cannot wash away the stain." The sisters hurry to the fountain and vainly strive to clean the key in the running water. At the same moment, distant trumpets announce the return of Bluebeard. The sisters are filled with terror. Arthur, who has been watching the scene, runs to Ysaure in the hope of saving her. She entreats him to fetch her brothers immediately. He hurries away on his mission and is seen on horseback galloping towards their castle. Ysaure watches him until he is lost to view and fervently prays for help. Anne mounts the tower so that she can watch for the coming of her brothers. The trumpets sound nearer and presently, Bluebeard enters in triumph, having vanquished his enemy. Ysaure goes to meet him. Bluebeard kisses his wife and asks her how she had fared during his absence. She, trying to maintain outward calm, expresses joy at his return, but he observes her nervous manner and is filled with suspicion. He asks for the keys, which Ysaure trembling restores to him. Remarking the absence of the iron key, he demands to know where it is. Shaking with fear, she gives it to him. He examines the key and asks Ysaure how it has come to be blood-stained. When she professes her ignorance of the case, Bluebeard tells her that she has disobeyed his commands and must suffer the penalty. Ysaure begs for time to say her prayers. Bluebeard consents, but bids her to make haste.

Overwhelmed with grief, she can hardly walk to the tower. She asks her sister if her brothers are in sight. Anne replies that nothing can be seen. Bluebeard orders Ysaure to descend from the tower. Once more, she asks her sister if she can see any signs of her brothers. Anne replies that she can now see some horsemen. Bluebeard, raging with impatience, begins to mount the steps leading to the tower. Ysaure, trying to gain time, hurries to the topmost step. Bluebeard follows and drags her down to the terrace. Then, lifting his swords, he prepares to cut off her head. At this moment, the brothers dash through the castle gates, followed by Arthur. They rescue Ysaure, and Ebremard challenges Bluebeard to single combat. The contest is waged with varying fortunes, until finally, Ebremard mortally wounds his opponent, who topples over the wall into the moat. Ysaure swoons into her brother's arms. Anne thanks her brothers for coming in time. They declare that Ysaure would have been killed, but for Arthur. The page again asks for Ysaure's hand, which is granted and the curtain falls on the happiness of the reunited lovers.

Scene 2 - A Magnificent Garden

In the center is a temple in honor of the god Saturn, with a colonnade in three parts: the temples of the past, of the present and of the future. At the sides are staircases leading to these temples, which are decorated with fantastic marble sphinxes

The wedding guests enter in a splendid ensemble. Next come four astrologers with their trains supported by pages. At their command, the god Uranus descends from the skies, followed by the goddess Venus and the god Mars and lastly, Stars of various grades. The Stars form groups and dance. Then there is a variation by Venus, followed by a waltz rendered by the Stars.

The door of the Temple of the Past opens and there emerges a procession of characters typical of an ancient period of France, who render several early dances such as the Gaillarde. The door of the Temple of the Present opens and now come characters representative of the present, who dance contemporary dances.

Finally, the door of the Temple of the Future opens and Ysaure and Arthur present the Grand Pas de deux éléctrique.

The ballet ends with a final ensemble and apotheosis.
