= Le Poisson doré =

Ballet in 4 acts/6 scenes with prologue and epilogue

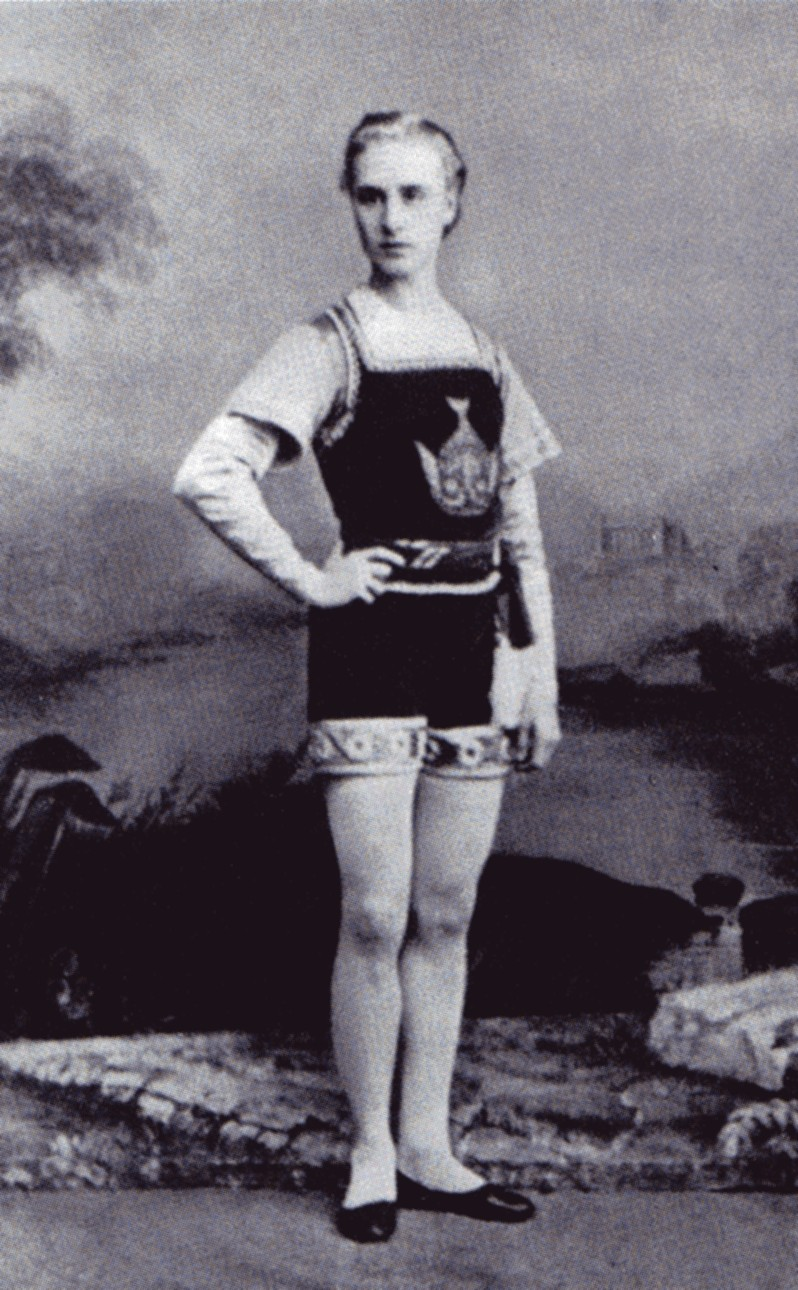
Pavel Gerdt in the Saint-Léon/Minkus Le Poisson d'or, St. Petersburg, 1867

Le Poisson doré (The Golden Fish) (ru: Золотая рыбка; a.k.a. Zolotaia Ribka) is a "fantastic ballet" in 4 acts/6 scenes with prologue and epilogue. The choreography was by Arthur Saint-Léon, and the music by Ludwig Minkus.

== History ==
Chief ballet-master of the St. Petersburg Imperial troupe Arthur Saint-Léon created in 1864 ballet The Little Humpbacked Horse, which was a huge success. It was the first ballet on the Russian theme and the choreographer decided to continue to develop this theme.

The scenario of this ballet was derived from Alexander Pushkin's 1835 poem The Tale of the Fisherman and the Fish. Saint-Léon wrote the libretto and made great changes: Pushkin’s heroes had not names – choreographer named them Galia and Taras; the characters of Pushkin lived on the shore of the sea - choreographer settled them in the Ukrainian village near the river Dnepr; in the Pushkin tale there were only two characters and the Golden Fish – choreographer gave them neighbours, etc.

The ballet was first presented (only Act I) by the Hermitage Theatre in Saint Petersburg on November 20/December 2 (Julian/Gregorian calendar dates), 1866. Praskovya Lebedeva performed the lead role Galia.

As chief choreographer of the Imperial ballet, Arthur Saint-Léon traveled from time to time to France and staged ballets at the Paris Opera. In 1866, he prepared for Paris the ballet La source. He invited Guglielmina Salvioni to dance the role of Naïla. The first production opened at the Théâtre Impérial de l´Opéra in Paris on 12 November 1866. Guglielmina Salvioni was such a success that the Paris theater critics praised her. Arthur Saint-Léon decided to continue working with her and invited her to Russia. She left for Russia in 1867. At this time Arthur Saint-Léon finished the ballet Le Poisson doré. Praskovya Lebedeva retired and Guglielmina Salvioni replaced her in the title role.

The complete work was then presented by the Imperial Ballet on October 8–20, 1867 at the Imperial Bolshoi Kamenny Theatre in St. Petersburg, Russia. Principal dancers at the première were Guglielmina Salvioni (as Galia) and Timofei Stukolkin (as Taras). In other roles: Clavdya Kantzyreva as the Golden Fish, Lev Ivanov as Petro, Nikolay Troitskiy as Jester, Pavel Gerdt as Fisherman.

== Social life in Russia ==
In these years, Russia's democratic movement grew. Representatives of the aristocracy occupied all the main important posts, but already a new class of Raznochintsy had arisen and were clamoring for the arts. Choreographer Saint-Léon's ballet Le Poisson doré glorified imperial power, which is understandable, since his work with the Imperial troupe was how he earned his living.

Mikhail Saltykov-Shchedrin ridiculed this ballet in his article: "I love ballet for its constancy. New governments are created; new people appear in the picture; new facts are being born; the whole structure of life is changing; science and arts are watching these events with anxious attention, as they supplement and sometimes alter their very content - only ballet hears nothing and knows nothing <...> But never before was the one-dimensional thinking of ballet and its conservative beginnings so brightly expressed, as in the ballet "Le Poisson Doré", staged last year at the Bolshoi theater of St Petersburg".

== After Guglielmina Salvioni ==
After Guglielmina Salvioni the Russian dancers played the role of Galia: Alexandra Kemmerer, Ekaterina Vazem, Vera Liadova (the first wife of Lev Ivanov), but success with the audience not used them and ballet Le Poisson doré was dropped from the repertoire several months later.

== A new version ==
In 1903 A. A. Gorsky made a new version of the ballet at Bolshoi Theatre in Moscow. He wrote a new libretto, deleted the names, complemented the music of Ludwig Minkus by music of other composers: Alexander Serov, Pyotr Ilyich Tchaikovsky, Léo Delibes, Johannes Brahms. Ballet of the 3 acts became 4.

Performers: Nikolay Domashov as Old Man, Sofia Fedorova as Old Woman, Enrichetta Grimaldi as the Golden Fish. A small role of butterfly was performed by the 11-year-old future prominent choreographer Kasyan Goleizovsky.

Ballet in this version was several years. There was not more productions.
