= The Daughter of the Snows =

1879 ballet by Marius Petipa

The Daughter of the Snows (also known as Snegurochka or La Fille des neiges) is a ballet in three acts and five scenes, with choreography by Marius Petipa and music by Ludwig Minkus. The libretto by Marius Petipa is based on the 1873 play The Snow Maiden by Alexander Ostrovsky, inspired by a Russian folk fairy tale about Snegurochka from the folklore collection by Alexander Afanasyev.

The ballet premiered on 7 January 1879 at the St. Petersburg Imperial Bolshoi Kammeny Theatre in St. Petersburg, Russia by the Imperial Ballet. Prima ballerina Yekaterina Vazem considered it "among Petipa's less successful ballets" and "not popular with the public." According to Vazem, the ballet was taken out of the repertoire after only a few performances.

Principal dancers: Yekaterina Vazem (as the Snow Maiden).
