= L'Etoile de Grenade =

1855 ballet by Marius Petipa

L’Étoile de Grenade is a ballet divertissement choreographed by Marius Petipa to music by Cesare Pugni. This was the first collaboration between Marius Petipa and the composer Cesare Pugni. Petipa did not receive credit for the production of this ballet in the theatre program.

The ballet was first presented by the Imperial Ballet on 21 January [O.S. 9 January] 1855 for the imperial court at the theatre of the Palace of the Grand Duchess Elena Pavlovna, Saint Petersburg, Russian Empire.

== See also ==
- List of ballets by title
