= Terpsichore (ballet) =

Ballet by Marius Petipa

An unidentified Ballerina of the Imperial Ballet in the Petipa/Pugni Terpsichore, St. Petersburg, circa 1870

Terpsichore is a ballet in one act based on the myth of Terpsichore, with choreography by Marius Petipa and music by Cesare Pugni. First presented by the Imperial Ballet on November 15/27 (Julian/Gregorian calendar dates), 1861, for the Imperial court at the theatre of Tsarskoe Selo in St. Petersburg, Russia.
