= Roxana, the Beauty of Montenegro =

1878 ballet

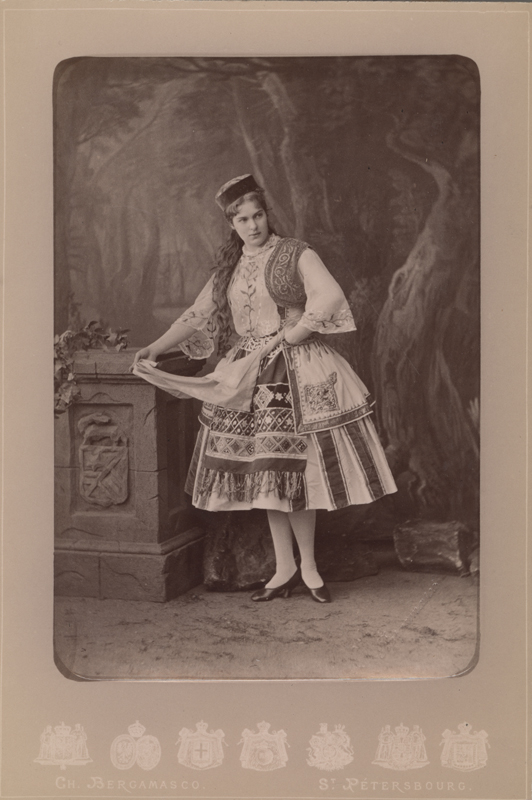
Marie Petipa in Roxana, the beauty of Montenegro, ballet by Marius Petipa with music by Léon Minkus (1878)

Roxana, the Beauty of Montenegro (Russian: Roksana, krasa Chernogorii, also known as Roxana) is a fantastic ballet in four acts, with choreography by Marius Petipa and music by Ludwig Minkus. Libretto by Sergei Khudekov and Marius Petipa.

The ballet was first presented by the Imperial Ballet on January 29/February 11 (Julian/Gregorian calendar dates), 1878 at the Imperial Bolshoi Kamenny Theatre in St. Petersburg, Russia, with Eugeniia Sokolova as Roxana, shortly after Montenegro was liberated by the Russian army from the Ottoman Empire.

The ballet historian Konstantin Skalkovsky gives an account in his study of late 19th century ballet in St. Petersburg of how Minkus' "Grand Marche" from the third act of this ballet "was the favorite piece of Tsar Alexander II, who in general did not love music. Several units of our troops (the Russian Army) stormed the Plevna to the music of this march."
