= Sergei Legat =

Russian ballet dancer (1875–1905)

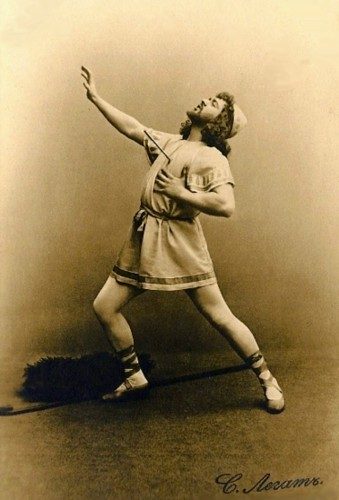
Sergei Legat as Aminta in Syvlia

Sergei Gustavovich Legat (Russian: Серге́й Густа́вович Лега́т; 27 September 1875 – 1 November 1905) was a Russian ballet dancer.

== Background ==
Sergei Gustavovich Legat was born on 27 September 1875, in Moscow. The younger brother of Nikolai Legat, he studied at the imperial ballet school with Pavel Gerdt, Christian Johansson, Lev Ivanov and his brother. Legat joined the Mariinsky Theatre in 1894 and quickly became a soloist. Admired for his stylistic performances he also taught, with pupils including Vaslav Nijinsky. Legat originated the dual role of the Nutcracker/Prince in Tchaikovsky's famous ballet. He married Marie Petipa (1857–1930). Many of the male variations that make up the traditional classical ballet repertory were created especially for him at the turn of the 20th century.

== Death ==
At the outbreak of the First Russian Revolution, Legat fell out with the authorities, and on 1 November 1905, he committed suicide in Saint Petersburg, slashing his throat with a razor.

== See also ==
- List of Russian ballet dancers
