= Marius Petipa =

French-Russian ballet dancer and choreographer (1818–1910)

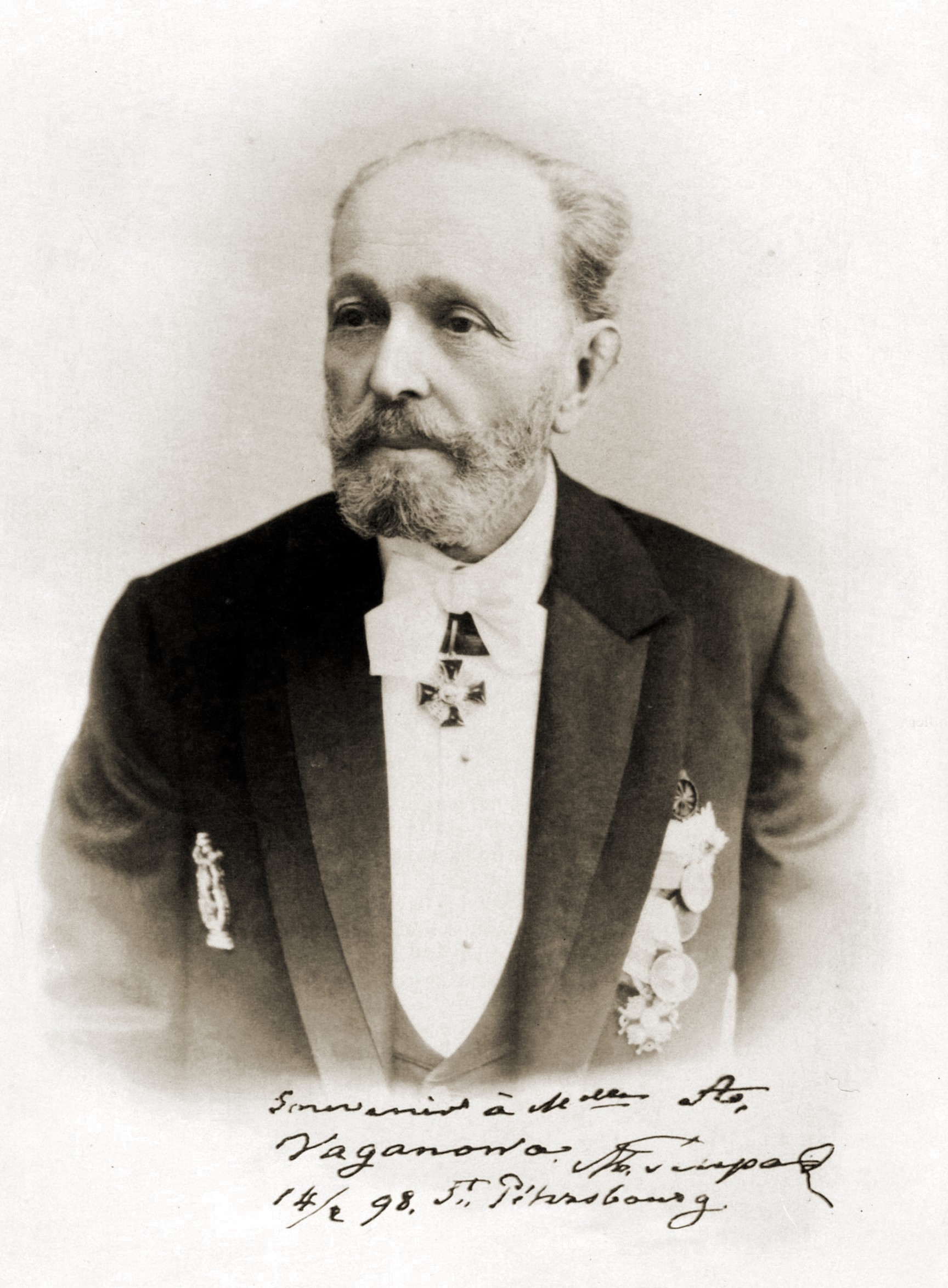
- Petipa c. 1890-1895
- Born: Marius Alphonse Petipa; 11 March 1818; Marseille, France
- Died: 14 July 1910 (aged 92); Gurzuf, Taurida Governorate, Russian Empire
- Resting place: Tikhvin Cemetery, St. Petersburg
- Education: Brussels Conservatory; Grand Théâtre de Bordeaux
- Known for: Ballet, choreography

Marius Ivanovich Petipa (Russian: Мариус Иванович Петипа; born Victor Marius Alphonse Petipa; 11 March 1818 – 14 July [O.S. 1 July] 1910) was a French and Russian ballet dancer, pedagogue and choreographer. He is considered one of the most influential ballet masters and choreographers in ballet history.

Petipa is noted for his long career as Premier maître de ballet (First Ballet Master) of the St. Petersburg Imperial Theatres, making him Ballet Master and principal choreographer of the Imperial Ballet (today known as the Mariinsky Ballet), a position he held from 1871 until 1903. Petipa created over fifty ballets, some of which have survived in versions either faithful to, inspired by, or reconstructed from his originals. He is most noted for The Pharaoh's Daughter (1862); Don Quixote (1869); La Bayadère (1877); Le Talisman (1889); The Sleeping Beauty (1890); The Nutcracker (choreographed jointly with Lev Ivanov) (1892); Le Réveil de Flore (1894); La Halte de cavalerie (1896); Raymonda (1898); Les Saisons (1900), and Les Millions d'Arlequin (a.k.a. Harlequinade) (1900).

Petipa also revived a substantial number of works created by other choreographers. Many of his revivals have become the basis of the majority of subsequent productions of those works. The most famous of Petipa's revivals are Le Corsaire, Giselle, La Esmeralda, Coppélia, La Fille Mal Gardée (with Lev Ivanov), The Little Humpbacked Horse and Swan Lake (with Lev Ivanov).

Many individual numbers taken from Petipa's work (both from original works and from revivals) continued to be performed independently, in spite of the fact that the full-length ballets that spawned them had disappeared from the Imperial Ballet's repertoire. Many of these pieces have endured in versions either based on the original or choreographed anew by others – the Grand Pas classique, Pas de trois and Mazurka des enfants from Paquita; Le Carnaval de Venise Pas de deux; The Talisman Pas de deux; La Esmeralda Pas de deux; the Diana and Actéon Pas de deux; La Halte de Cavalerie Pas de deux; the Don Quixote Pas de deux; La Fille Mal Gardée Pas de deux; and the Harlequinade Pas de deux.

== Early life and career ==
Marius Petipa was born Victor Marius Alphonse Petipa in Marseille, France on 11 March 1818. His mother, Victorine Grasseau, was a tragic actress and teacher of drama, while his father, Jean-Antoine Petipa, was among the most renowned Ballet Masters and pedagogues in Europe. At the time of Marius's birth, Jean Petipa was engaged as Premier danseur (Principal Male Dancer) to the Salle Bauveau (known today as the Opéra de Marseille), and in 1819 he was appointed Maître de ballet to that theatre.

Marius Petipa spent his early childhood traveling throughout Europe with his family, as his parents' professional engagements took them from city to city. By the time Marius was six years old, his family had settled in Brussels in what was then the United Kingdom of the Netherlands, where his father was appointed Maître de ballet and Premier danseur to the Théâtre de la Monnaie. The young Marius received his general education at the Grand College in Brussels, while also attending the Brussels Conservatory where he studied music and learned to play the violin.

Just as he had done with his other children, Jean Petipa began giving the young Marius lessons in ballet at the age of seven. At first the young boy resisted, caring very little for dance. Nevertheless, he soon came to love this art form that was so much the life and identity of his family, and he excelled quickly. At the age of nine Marius performed for the first time in a ballet production as a Savoyard in his father's staging of Pierre Gardel's 1800 ballet La Dansomanie in 1827.

On 25 August 1830, the Belgian Revolution erupted after a performance of Daniel Auber's opera La muette de Portici at the Théâtre de la Monnaie, where Marius' father now served as Premier maître de ballet. The violent street fighting that followed caused all theatres to be shut down for a time, and consequently Jean Petipa found himself without a position. The Petipa family was left in dire straits for some years.

The Petipa family relocated to Bordeaux, France, in 1834 where Marius' father had secured the position of Premier maître de ballet to the Grand Théâtre de Bordeaux. While in Bordeaux, Marius completed his ballet training under the great Auguste Vestris. By 1838 he was appointed Premier danseur to the Ballet de Nantes in Nantes, France. During his time in Nantes the young Petipa began to try his hand at choreography by creating a number of one-act ballets and divertissements.

The 21-year-old Marius Petipa accompanied his father on a tour of the United States with a group of French dancers in July 1839. Among the many engagements was a performance of Jean Coralli's La Tarentule at the National Theatre on Broadway, being the first ballet performance ever seen in New York City. The tour proved to be a disaster, as many in the uncultured American audiences of that time had never before seen ballet. To add to the fiasco, the American impresario who arranged the engagements stole a large portion of the troupe's receipts and quickly disappeared without a trace. Upon leaving for France, Petipa's ticket only allowed him passage to Nantes, but instead of returning to that city he stowed away in the cabin of a woman he had seduced so that he could secure passage to Paris.

By 1840, Petipa had made his début with the ballet company of the Comédie Française in Paris. His first performance with this troupe was given as a benefit performance for the actress Rachel where he partnered the legendary ballerina Carlotta Grisi. Petipa also took part in performances at the Paris Opéra where his brother Lucien Petipa was engaged as Premier danseur.

=== Bordeaux ===
Petipa was offered the position of Premier danseur to the Grand Théâtre in Bordeaux in 1841. There, he studied further with the great Vestris, all the while dancing the leads in such ballets as La Fille Mal Gardée, La Péri and Giselle. While performing with the company his skills as not only a dancer but as a partner were much celebrated. His partnering of Carlotta Grisi during a performance of La Péri was much celebrated, particularly his almost acrobatic lifts and catches of the ballerina that dazzled the audience. While in Bordeaux, Petipa began mounting his own original full-length productions. Among these works were La Jolie Bordelaise (The Beauty of Bordeaux), La Vendange (The Grape Picker), L'Intrigue Amoureuse (The Intrigues of Love) and Le Langage des Fleurs (The Voice of the Flowers).

=== Madrid ===
In 1843, Petipa was offered the position premier danseur at the Teatro del Circo in Madrid, Spain. For the next three years he would acquire an acute knowledge of traditional Spanish Dancing while producing new works based on Spanish themes – Carmen et son toréro (Carmen and the Bullfighter), La Perle de Séville (The Pearl of Seville), L’Aventure d’une fille de Madrid (The Adventures of a Madrileña), La Fleur de Grenade (The Flower of Granada) and Départ pour la course des taureaux (Leaving for the Bull Fights). In 1846, he began a love affair with the wife of the Marquis de Chateaubriand, a prominent member of the French Embassy. Learning of the affair, the Marquis challenged Petipa to a duel. Rather than keep his fateful appointment, Petipa quickly left Spain, never to return. He then travelled to Paris where he stayed for a brief period. While in the city he took part in a performance at the Théâtre de l’Académie Royale de Musique where he partnered the ballerina Thérèse Elssler, sister of Fanny Elssler.

== St. Petersburg, Russia ==
In 1847 Marius seduced yet another man's wife, and the husband called for a duel, yet again. Duels were banned, and the threat of court repercussions loomed over Marius, so the family decided it was best for him to leave France. Marius' brother, Lucien Petipa, was familiar with working in Russia and sent an inquiry to Antoine Titus in St. Petersburg.

This coincided with a need to find a strong male lead for the Russian ballet prima ballerina Yelena Andreyanova, (who was the mistress of the Director of the Imperial Theaters, Alexandr Gedeonov). Antoine Titus resolved dilemmas for both parties and introduced the two sides, after which Petipa and his father were invited to Russia.

So, Marius Petipa found himself in St. Petersburg late in the same year, beginning his career ascent to become one of the most influential choreographers in history.

=== Early career ===
In 1847, Petipa accepted the position of premier danseur to the Imperial Theatres of St. Petersburg, at that time the capital of the Russian Empire. The position of premier danseur had become vacant upon the departure of the French danseur Emile Gredlu, and Petipa soon relocated to Russia. On 5 June [O.S. 24 May] 1847 the twenty-nine-year-old Petipa arrived in the imperial capital. In 1848 Petipa's father also relocated to St. Petersburg, where he taught the Classe de perfection at the Imperial Ballet School until his death in 1855.

For his début, the director of the Imperial Theatres Alexander Gedeonov commissioned Petipa and the Ballet Master Pierre-Frédéric Malevergne to create the first Russian production of Joseph Mazilier's celebrated ballet Paquita, first staged at the Paris Opéra in 1846. The ballet premiered in St. Petersburg on 8 October [O.S. 26 September] 1847 with the Prima ballerina Yelena Andreyanova in the title rôle and Petipa himself in the largely mimed rôle of Lucien d’Hervilly.

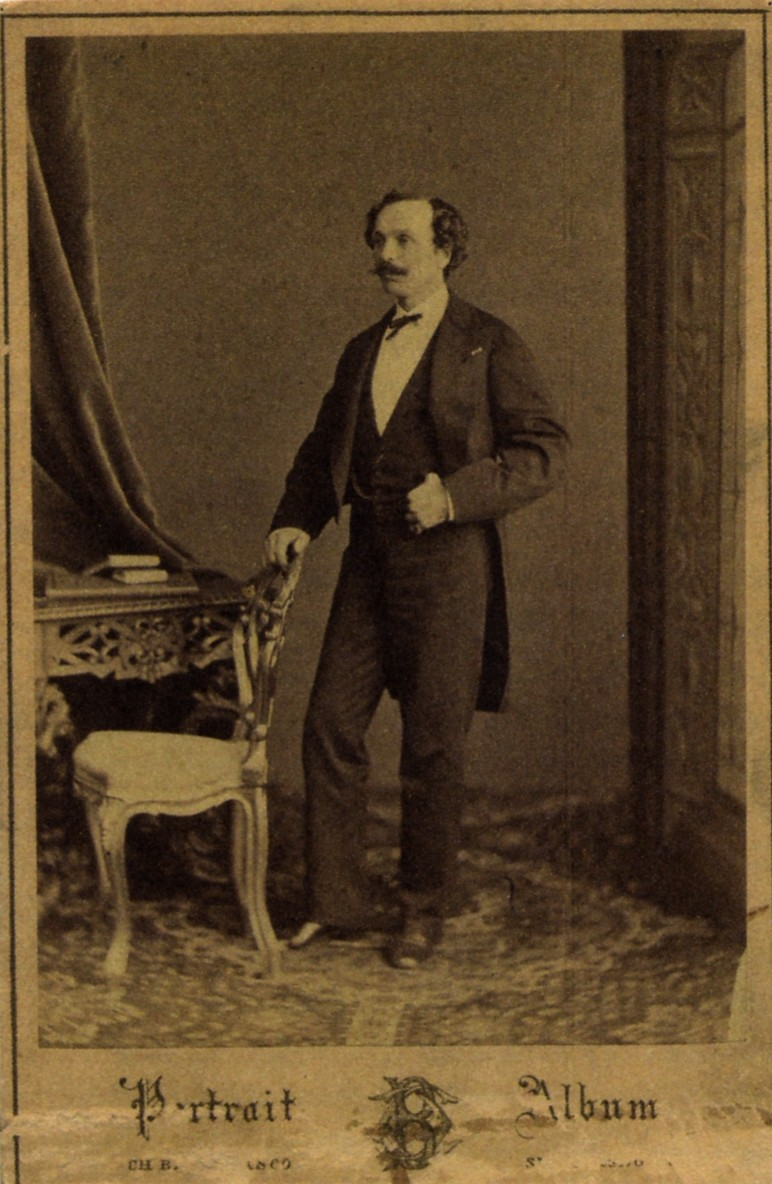
Portrait of Marius Petipa around the time of his arrival in Russia. St. Petersburg, c. 1855.

The following season Petipa and his father staged a revival of Mazilier's 1840 ballet Le Diable amoureux (The Devil in Love), which premiered under the title Satanella on 22 February [O.S. 10 February] 1848. The prima ballerina Andreyonova performed the title rôle, with Petipa in the rôle of Fabio.

At the time Petipa had arrived in St. Petersburg, the Imperial Ballet had experienced a considerable decline in popularity with the public since the 1842 departure of Marie Taglioni, who had been engaged in the Imperial capital as guest ballerina. The productions of Paquita and Satanella brought about a measure of prestige and attention for the company. Critic Raphael Zotov reflected, "Our lovely ballet company was reborn with the productions of Paquita and Satanella, and its superlative performances placed the company again at its former level of glory and universal affection."

In the winter of 1849, the French Ballet Master Jules Perrot arrived in St. Petersburg, having accepted the position of premier maître de ballet of the St. Petersburg Imperial Theatres. He was accompanied by his chief collaborator, the prolific Italian composer Cesare Pugni, who was appointed Ballet Composer of the Imperial Theatres, a position created especially for him. Aside from dancing the principal rôles in many of Perrot's productions, Petipa rehearsed older works with the company and assisted Perrot in staging revivals (such as Giselle in 1850, and Le Corsaire in 1858), all the while learning a great deal from the man who was at that time the most celebrated choreographer in Europe. Although Petipa did not create his own original works during this period, he nevertheless staged many dances for various operas, and on occasion revised dances for Perrot's many revivals of older works.

By 1850 Petipa's first child, a son named Marius Mariusovich Petipa (1850–1919) was born. His mother, Marie Thérèse Bourdin— with whom Petipa had a brief liaison—died five years after the birth of their child. In 1854 Petipa married the Prima ballerina Mariia Surovshchikova-Petipa. Together they had two children: Marie Mariusovna Petipa (1857–1930), who would go on to become a celebrated dancer in her own right, and Jean Mariusovich Petipa (1859–1871).

On 21 January [O.S. 9 January] 1855 Petipa presented his first original ballet in over six years, a ballet-divertissement titled L’Étoile de Grenade (The Star of Granada), for which he collaborated for the first time with the composer Cesare Pugni. The work was presented for the first time at the Palace of the Grand Duchess Elena Pavlovna, a fanatic balletomane and patron of the arts. L’Étoile de Grenade was followed by La Rose, la violette et le papillon (The Rose, the Violet and the Butterfly) in 1857, Un Mariage sous la Régence (A Marriage Under the Regency) in 1858, Le Marché des parisien (The Parisian Market) in 1859, Le Dahlia Bleu (The Blue Dahlia) in 1860 and Terpsichore in 1861. All of Petipa's works during this period were tailored especially for the talents of his wife Maria, who performed the principal rôles to considerable acclaim, and soon was named Prima ballerina to the St. Petersburg Imperial Theatres.

On 29 May 1861 Petipa presented his 1859 ballet Le Marché des parisiens at the Théâtre Impérial de l’Opéra in Paris as Le Marché des Innocents. Petipa's wife Maria reprised the principal rôle of Lizetta (renamed Gloriette) to great success.

In 1858 Jules Perrot retired to his native France, never to return to Russia again. Petipa anticipated succeeding Perrot as premier maître de ballet. His years of serving as assistant to Perrot had taught him much. Choreography was a logical alternative to dancing for the now 41-year-old Petipa, who was soon to retire from the stage. But it was not yet to be. In 1860 the renowned French Ballet Master Arthur Saint-Léon was given the coveted position by the director of the Imperial Theatres Andrei Saburov, and soon a healthy and productive rivalry between him and Petipa ensued, bringing the Imperial Ballet to new heights throughout the 1860s.

=== Second maître de ballet of the Imperial Theatres ===
The great Italian Ballerina Carolina Rosati had been engaged as guest artist with the Imperial Theatres since 1855. By 1861 her contract with the company was set to expire, and upon leaving Russia for her native Italy she intended to retire from the stage. Rosati's contract stipulated that she was to be given a benefit performance in a new production, and in late 1861 she requested from the director Saburov that preparations begin post haste. Saburov at first refused, stating that there was not enough funds and that such a production could not be staged in time. Rosati enlisted the assistance of Petipa, who reminded Saburov that the Imperial Theatres were contractually obligated to grant the ballerina a new production for her benefit. Saburov asked Petipa as to whether or not he could produce a new full-length grand ballet for Rosati in only six weeks. Confidently, Petipa answered "Yes, I shall try, and probably succeed." Saburov immediately put all other rehearsals on hold so that the company could concentrate on the production of the new ballet.

During Petipa's sojourn in Paris for the staging of Le Marché des Innocents, he acquired a scenario from the dramatist Jules-Henri Vernoy de Saint-Georges for a ballet titled La Fille du Pharaon (The Pharaoh's Daughter), inspired by Théophile Gautier's Le Roman de la Momie. Throughout the Victorian era Europe was fascinated with all things concerning the art and culture of ancient Egypt, and Petipa was sure that a ballet on such a subject would be a great success.

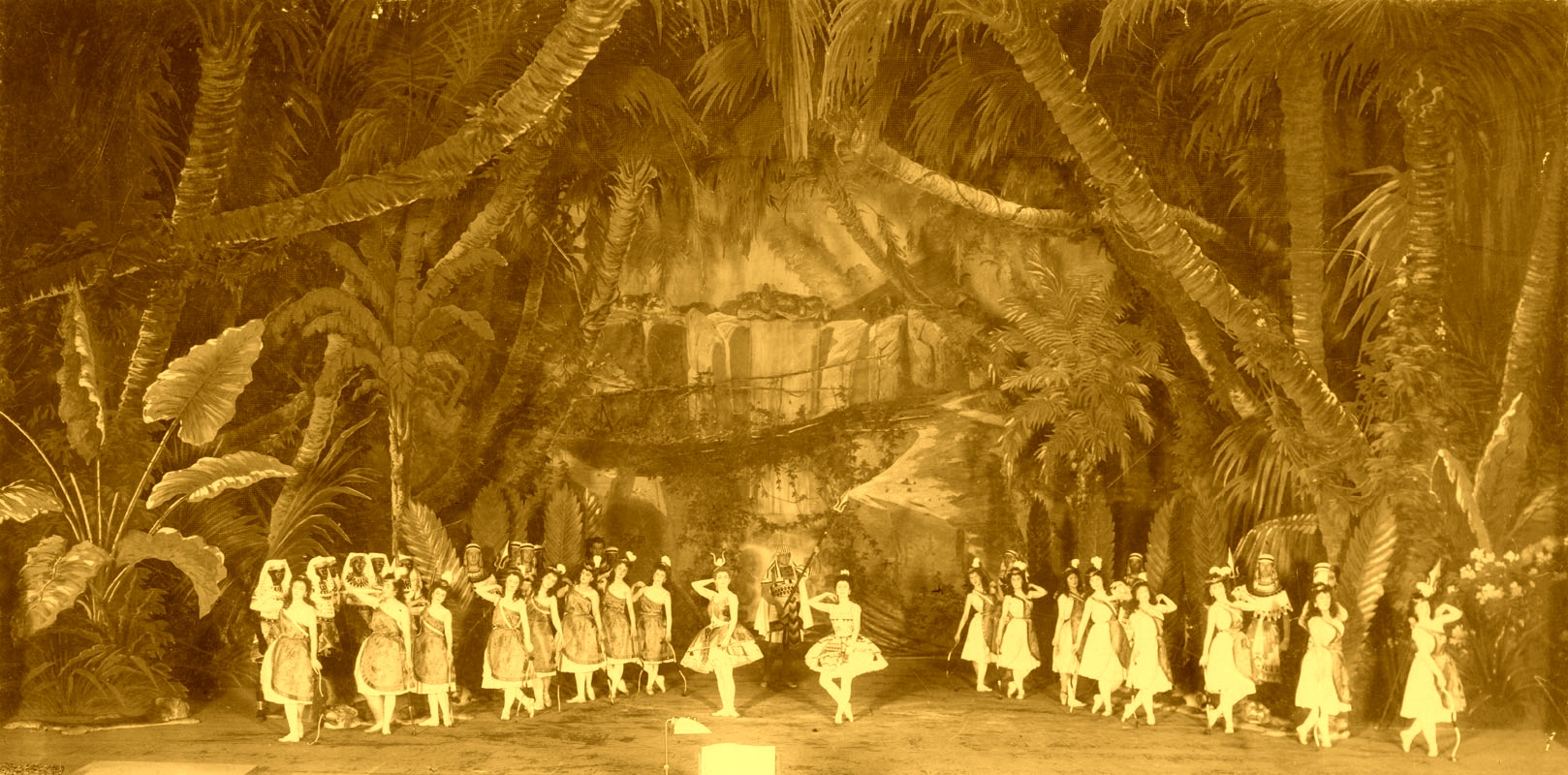
The stage of the Mariinsky Theatre with cast in act I of Petipa's final revival of The Pharaoh's Daughter, St. Petersburg, 1898. In the center is Mathilde Kschessinskaya as the Princess Aspicia (right), and Anna Johannson as the slave Ramzé (left).

Petipa began work by collaborating with the composer Pugni, who wrote his melodious and apt score with Petipa while in rehearsals. The Pharaoh's Daughter premiered on 30 January [O.S. 18 January] 1862 to an unrivaled success. The work exceeded even the opulent tastes of the Tsarist audience, as so lavish and exotic a ballet had not been seen on the Imperial stage for some time. The work went on to become the most popular ballet in the entire repertory of the Imperial Theatres—by 1903 it had been performed 203 times. The great success of The Pharaoh's Daughter earned for Petipa the position of second Maître de ballet to the Imperial Theatres. Saint-Léon answered the success of Petipa's The Pharaoh's Daughter with the fantastical ballet Le Petit Cheval bossu, Ou La Tsar-Demoiselle (The Little Humpbacked Horse, or The Tsar Maiden), a ballet adaptation of Pyotr Yershov's famous Russian poem. The work proved to be a success equal to that of The Pharaoh's Daughter, with its series of fantastical tableaux set under-water and on an enchanted isle, as well as the ballet's final Grand divertissement celebrating the many peoples of the Russian Empire.

Though Arthur Saint-Léon was by title and technicality Petipa's superior, the two men were viewed as equals by the critics and balletomanes of the day, and would rival one another with splendid productions throughout the 1860s. Not only did Saint-Léon and Petipa have their own respective audiences and critics, but also their own ballerinas—Petipa mounted the majority of his works at that time for his wife, the Prima ballerina Mariia Surovshchikova-Petipa, while Saint-Léon mounted the majority of his works for the Prima ballerina Marfa Muravieva. Despite their rivalry, nearly every ballet staged by Petipa and Saint-Léon during the 1860s was set to the music of Cesare Pugni.

On 6 February [O.S. 25 January] 1868 Petipa presented a lavish revival of the ballet Le Corsaire for the visiting ballerina Adèle Grantzow, for which he included the celebrated scene Le jardin animé to the music of Léo Delibes. Petipa presented his next new grand ballet on 29 October [O.S. 17 October] 1868. This was the colossal ballet Le Roi Candaule (known in Russian as Tsar Candavl), which was staged especially for the visiting ballerina Henrietta D'or. The ballet featured the Pas de Vénus, which was considered to be among Petipa's greatest masterpieces of classical choreography, with the ballerina D'or executing five pirouettes during her piqué turns in rapid succession. The ballet also included the pas known as Les amours de Diane, or simply as the Pas de Diane, which would later be transformed by Agrippina Vaganova into the so-called Diane and Actéon Pas de Deux for her 1935 revival of La Esmeralda. Le Roi Candaule would go on to break attendance records at the St. Petersburg Imperial Bolshoi Kamenny Theatre, and by 1903 the work had been performed 194 times. Petipa would later comment in his memoirs that Le Roi Candaule was " ... the indulgence of my youth."

Petipa's final work of the 1860s remains a cornerstone of the classical ballet repertory. Don Quixote was mounted for Moscow's Bolshoi Theatre, with the famous ballerina Anna Sobeshchanskaya in the role of Kitri. The composer Ludwig Minkus was commissioned to write the ballet's score, marking the beginning of a long and fruitful collaboration between him and Petipa.

=== Premier maître de ballet of the Imperial Theatres ===
In 1869 Saint-Léon's contract was set to expire. His last works for the St. Petersburg stage, Le Poisson doré (1866) and Le Lys (1869), led the Minister of the Imperial Court to refuse renewal of the Ballet Master's contract. While in the Café de Divan on the Avenue de l'Opéra in Paris, Saint-Léon died of a heart attack on 2 September 1870. Not long before his death the composer Cesare Pugni—Petipa's chief collaborator for many years—died on 2 February [O.S. 21 January] 1870.

Petipa was officially named premier maître de ballet on 12 March [O.S. 28 February] 1871. On 21 November [O.S. 9 November] 1871 Petipa presented Don Quixote in the St. Petersburg in an expanded and far more lavish edition. Ludwig Minkus's score was hailed unanimously as a masterwork of ballet music, earning the composer the post of Ballet Composer of the St. Petersburg Imperial Theatres. Petipa and Minkus created a successful series of original works and revivals throughout the 1870s: La Camargo in 1872, Le Papillon in 1874, Les Brigands (The Bandits) in 1875, Les Aventures de Pélée (The Adventures of Peleus) in 1876, Roxana in 1878, La Fille des Neiges (The Daughter of the Snows) in 1879, and Mlada, also in 1879.

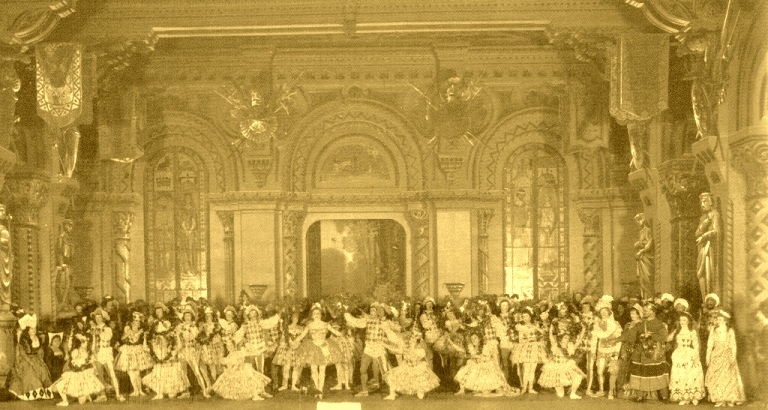
The stage of the Mariinsky Theatre with the cast of act I/scene 1 of the original production of Petipa's Raymonda. In the center is Pierina Legnani, creator of the title role. On the right of the stage is (right to left) Claudia Kulichevskaya as Clémence, Olga Preobrajenska Henriette, Pavel Gerdt as Abderakhman, and Nikolai Legat as Béranger. St. Petersburg, 1898.

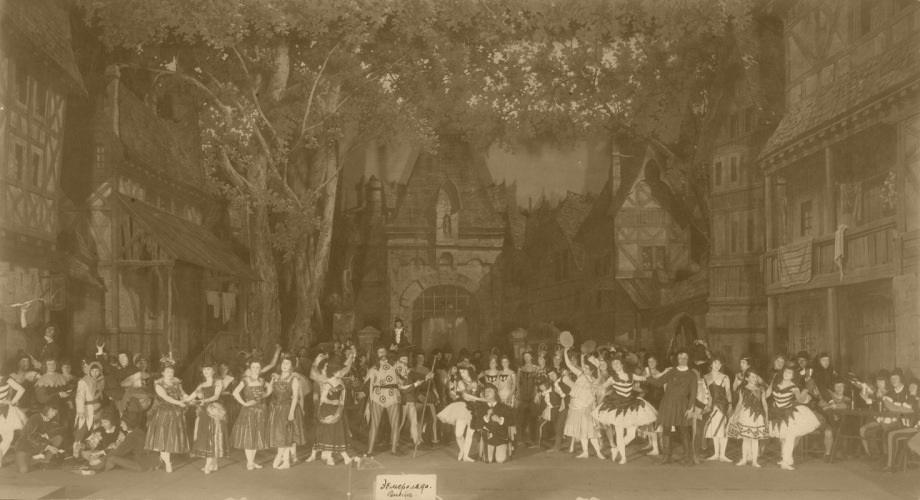
The stage of the Mariinsky Theatre with the cast of act I of Petipa's final revival of Jules Perrot's La Esmeralda. St. Petersburg, 1899. In the center is Mathilde Kschessinskaya in the title role with Pavel Gerdt as Pierre Gringoire kneeling next to her.

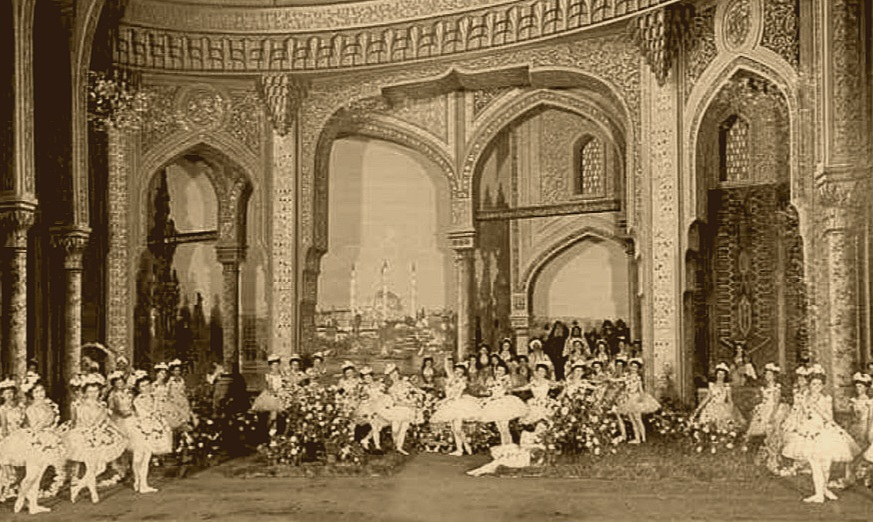
The stage of the Mariinsky Theatre with the cast of the scene Le Jardin animé from Act II in Petipa's final revival of Le Corsaire. St. Petersburg, 1899.

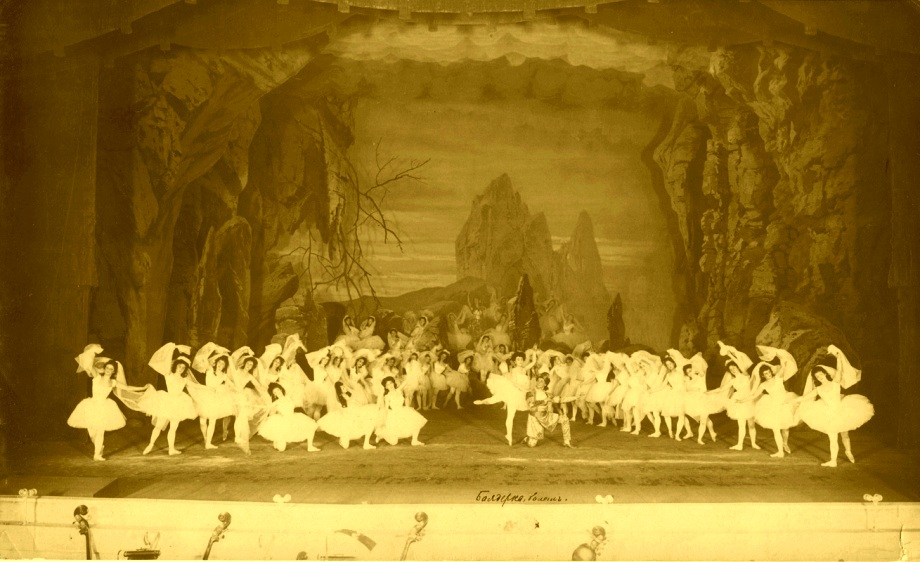
The stage of the Mariinsky Theatre with the cast of the scene The Kingdom of the Shades in Petipa's final revival of La Bayadère. St. Petersburg, 1900. In the center is Mathilde Kschessinskaya as Nikiya with Pavel Gerdt as Solor kneeling next to her. Left of center stage are the three soloist shades (kneeling, left to right): Varvara Rhykliakova, Anna Pavlova, and Julia Sedova.

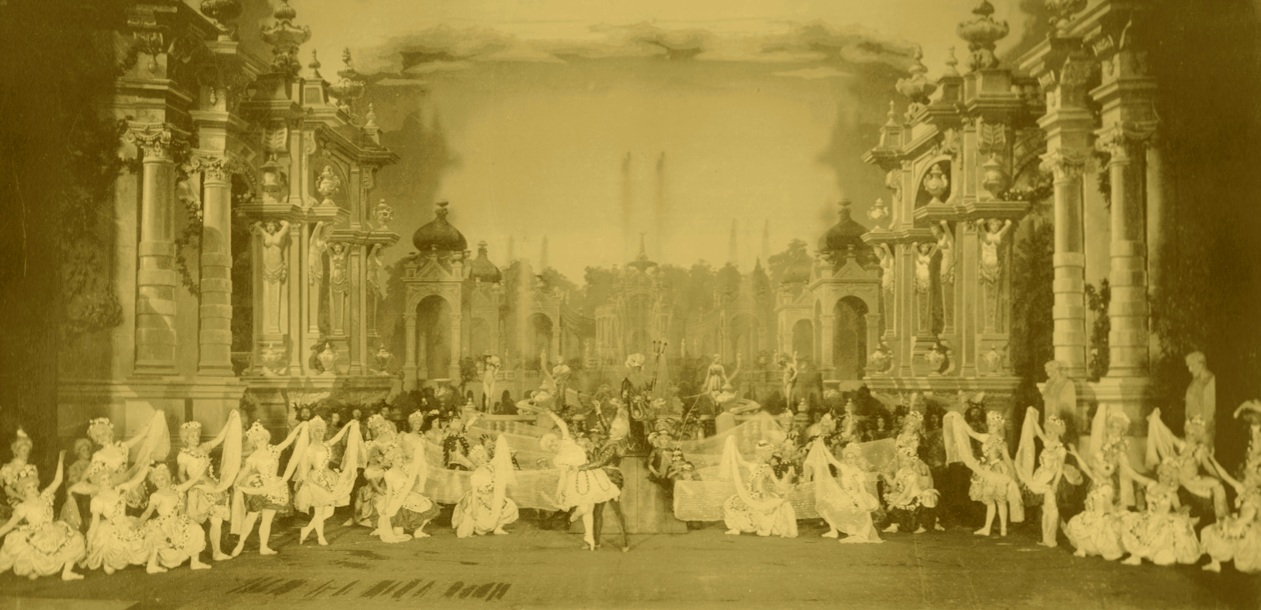
The stage of the Mariinsky Theatre with the cast of act III in Lev Ivanov's revival of Petipa's La Camargo. St. Petersburg, 1901. In the center is Pierina Legnani in the title role with Nikolai Legat as Vestris.

Petipa's next ballet would be one of the most celebrated and enduring of all his works—La Bayadère was staged for the benefit performance of the Prima ballerina Ekaterina Vazem on 4 February [O.S. 23 January] 1877. The libretto by Petipa and the dramatist Sergei Khudekov was much admired, while the score of Ludwig Minkus was considered a chef d'œuvre of its genre.

=== The golden age of Russian ballet ===
During the twilight of Imperial Russia, the ballet of St. Petersburg flourished before a public that possessed a high level of connoisseurship. The treasury of the Russian Emperor—who was at that time the wealthiest person on Earth—lavished millions of rubles a year on the Imperial Ballet, opera, and the Imperial Ballet School (today known as the Vaganova Academy of Russian Ballet). Each new season required that Petipa create a new multi-act Grand ballet, that he choreograph the dance sections for various operas, and that he prepare galas and divertissements for court performances, royal nuptials, etc. With the ballet thriving in such an environment, the late 19th and early 20th centuries saw what is considered to be the golden age of Russian ballet.

The scene Aurora's Bedchamber from the Kirov/Mariinsky Ballet's reconstruction of Petipa's original production of The Sleeping Beauty, St. Petersburg, 1999. The company restored the lavish production designed for the ballet's original inception.

This era coincided with an important change: upon the retirement of Ludwig Minkus in 1886, the director Ivan Vsevolozhsky abolished the official post of Ballet Composer in an effort to diversify the music supplied for new works.

Petipa presented his colossal grand ballet set in ancient Rome La Vestale in 1888, which was staged for the benefit performance of the visiting Italian ballerina Elena Cornalba. The ballet was set to the music of the composer Mikhail Ivanov, a noted music critic. The next year, Ivan Vsevolozhsky commissioned the Italian Riccardo Drigo—principal conductor of the Imperial Ballet & Italian Opera—to compose the score for Petipa's Le Talisman, also staged for Cornalba. Although the ballet was not a success Drigo's score was much praised by contemporary critics.

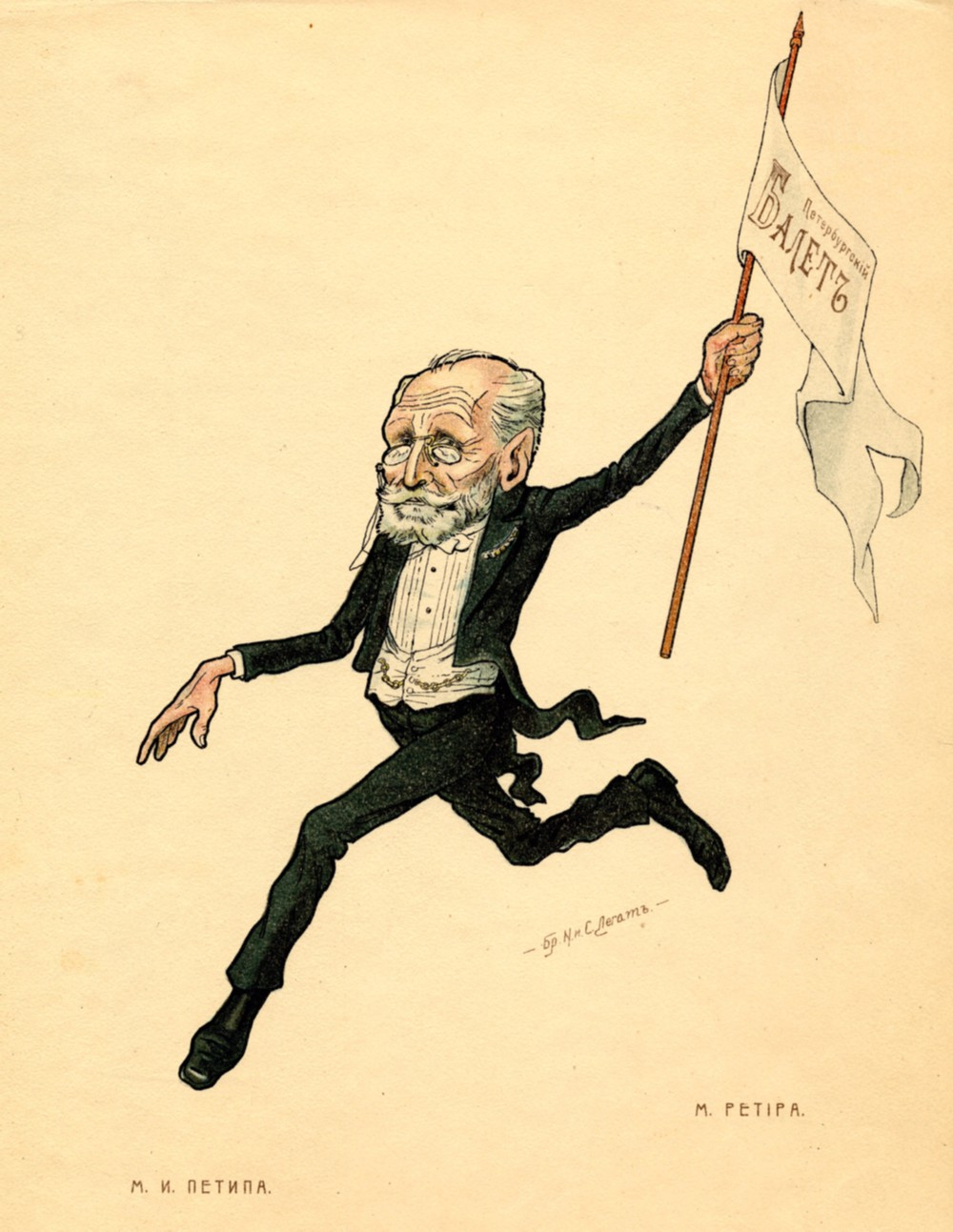
Caricature of Marius Petipa by the brothers Nikolai and Sergei Legat from their celebrated book "The Russian Ballet in Caricatures". Petipa is shown holding a banner that reads Петербургскій Балетъ, meaning St. Petersburg Ballet.

The director Vsevolozhsky commissioned the great composer Pyotr Illyich Tchaikovsky to compose the score for Petipa's The Sleeping Beauty, which premiered on 15 January [O.S. 3 January] 1890. The ballet proved to be one of Petipa's masterpieces of choreography. The Sleeping Beauty proved to be so popular that by April 1903 it had been performed 100 times, making it one of the most popular works in the Imperial Ballet's repertory, second only to Petipa's The Pharaoh's Daughter.

Petipa was diagnosed with a severe case of the skin disease pemphigus in 1892. The constant pain and itching brought on by this disease caused Petipa to refrain from choreography for the Imperial Ballet's entire 1892–1893 theatrical season. It has been widely accepted by history that the responsibility of staging Tchaikovsky's second work for the Imperial Ballet The Nutcracker, fell to the Imperial Theatre's second Ballet Master Lev Ivanov. With regard to who was ultimately responsible for the choreography for The Nutcracker, many sources contradict one another. Some claim either that Petipa was responsible for staging the entire ballet or that he merely supervised Ivanov's progress. The Nutcracker premiered 18 December [O.S. 6 December] 1892 on a double bill with Tchaikovsky's opera Iolanta at the Mariinsky Theatre. Many critics of the day considered the work to not even be a ballet at all, with far too much emphasis on spectacle, something made all the more unsuccessful since the ballerina's role was reduced to a Grand Pas de deux in the final scene. The critics also complained that Ivanov's choreography was banal, with only a few passages succeeding simply because Ivanov imitated the choreography of Petipa's dances from other works. One such passage mentioned in reviews was the Valse des flocons de neige (Waltz of the Snowflakes), which was said to be almost identical to a waltz from Petipa's 1879 ballet La Fille des Neiges (The Daughter of the Snows).

Petipa's illness kept him from working for nearly all of the 1892-1893 season. It was during this time that Enrico Cecchetti, the great Italian dancer and teacher, began to assist Lev Ivanov in substituting for Petipa in the staging of ballets and rehearsals. In 1893 Petipa supervised Cecchetti and Ivanov's staging of the ballet Cinderella, set to the music of Baron Boris Fitinhof-Schell. The Italian ballerina Pierina Legnani made her début in the title role, and on the evening of the premiere, 15 December [O.S. 3 December] 1893, her perfection of technique and execution caused a sensation, with critics and balletomanes hailing her as the supreme ballerina of her generation. In the last act she astounded the audience by performing a feat never before executed by any Ballerina: 32 fouettés en tournant. Petipa was so enamored with the stellar ballerina that he bestowed upon her the rarely held title of Prima ballerina assoluta, and over the course of the next eight years, Petipa staged many new ballets especially for her talents.

Petipa returned to choreography from his long infirmity with the one-act Le Réveil de Flore (The Awakening of Flora), set to the music of Riccardo Drigo. The ballet had its premiere on 9 August [O.S. 28 July] 1894 at Peterhof Palace. Petipa staged Le Réveil de Flore in honor of the wedding of Tsar Alexander III's daughter, the Grand Duchess Xenia to the Grand Duke Alexander Mikhailovich. The ballet was soon transferred to the Mariinsky Theatre.

In 1893 Tchaikovsky died, and in February 1894 a gala was given in his honor at the Mariinsky Theatre. For the occasion Lev Ivanov mounted the second scene from Tchaikovsky's Swan Lake, first produced in Moscow in 1877. The gala was a success, with the excerpt from Swan Lake being the biggest success on the program. It was soon decided that a revival of the full-length work would be staged for the 1894–1895 season, with Ivanov staging the second and fourth scenes and Petipa staging the first and third scenes. Riccardo Drigo would revise Tchaikovsky's 1877 score in accordance with Petipa's instructions, and Tchaikovsky's brother Modeste would revise the ballet's scenario. The premiere on 27 January [O.S. 15 January] 1895 with Legnani in the dual rôle of Odette/Odile was a triumph, and in Petipa and Ivanov's version Swan Lake would go on to become one of the greatest of all ballets, remaining one of the ultimate tests for the classical ballerina and the corps de ballet.

=== The turn of the 20th century ===
Petipa would spend a great deal of his final years reviving older ballets. In the winter of 1895 Petipa presented lavish revivals of his 1889 Le Talisman, and Saint-Léon's 1864 The Little Humpbacked Horse (as La Tsar-Demoiselle), both with Legnani in the principal rôles. The turn of the 20th century saw Petipa present more revivals: The Pharaoh's Daughter in 1898; La Esmeralda, Giselle and Le Corsaire in 1899; La Bayadère in 1900 and Le Roi Candaule in 1903. These revivals would prove to be Petipa's "finishing touch" on these works.

Petipa also mounted new works. For the celebrations held at the Moscow Imperial Bolshoi Theatre in honor of the coronation of Emperor Nicholas II, Petipa presented the one-act ballet to Drigo's music, La Perle, which proved to be the greatest success during the gala of 29 May [O.S. 17 May] 1896. Le Perle was truly a ballet à grand spectacle: based on the un-staged danced scene La Pérégrina from Verdi's opera Don Carlos, which was to have been choreographed by Petipa's brother Lucien. The ballet featured some of Petipa's most grand choreography for a 200-member cast, all set to Drigo's Wagnerian score that boasted an off-stage choir.

In 1896 Petipa was given a benefit performance to celebrate 50 years in service to the St. Petersburg Imperial Theatres. For the occasion, Petipa created one of the most lavish ballets he ever staged: Bluebeard, based on the Perrault fairytale to the music of Pyotr Schenk, was given its premiere on 20 December [O.S. 8 December] 1896. The ballet was given a sumptuous production. Many critics felt that the ballet was merely a gargantuan excuse for spectacle and dances, something made all the more apparent with the spectacular showcasing of Pierina Legnani in the principal role of Ysaure. The final tableau consisted of a three-part astrological divertissement titled The Temple of the Past, Present & Future. The Temple of the Future completed the scene with the Pas de deux éléctrique performed by Legnani and Nikolai Legat to a tremendous ovation from the audience. In spite of the criticisms of Bluebeard, the critics unanimously praised the seventy-eight-year-old Petipa's seemingly limitless imagination in the creation of classical dances, proving once again that no other choreographer in Europe could claim to be his rival.

On 19 January [O.S. 7 January] 1898, the nearly eighty-year-old Petipa presented Raymonda, one of his most popular ballets. Set in Hungary during the Middle Ages, the ballet featured music by Alexander Glazunov and premiered to great acclaim. Petipa's Pas classique hongrois, from the ballet's final act, later became one of his best-known and most enduring choreographic works. The demanding choreography created for Legnani, who danced the title role, became a major test of a classical ballerina's technical skill.

Petipa presented what would prove to be his final masterpiece on 23 February [O.S. 11 February] 1900 at the Hermitage Theatre, Les Millions d'Arlequin (or Harlequinade), a balletic Harlequinade set to Drigo's music. Harlequinade was dedicated by both Drigo and Petipa to the new Empress, Alexandra Feodorovna, a work which would prove to be the last enduring flash of Petipa's choreographic oeuvre.

=== Final years with the Imperial Ballet ===
In spite of his vast accomplishments, Petipa's final years with the Imperial Ballet were difficult. By the turn of the 20th century new innovations in the art of classical dance began to become apparent. With all of this, Petipa's rocky relationship with the new director of the Imperial Theatres, Vladimir Telyakovsky, appointed to the position in 1901, served as a catalyst to the Ballet Master's end. Telyakovsky made no effort in disguising his dislike of Petipa's work, as he felt that the art of classical ballet had become stagnant under him, and felt that other choreographers should have a chance at the helm of the Imperial Ballet. But even at the age of eighty-three, and suffering from the constant pain brought on by a severe case of the skin disease pemphigus, the old Maestro showed no signs of slowing down, much to Telyakovsky's chagrin.

One example of Telyakovsky's efforts in his attempt to "de-throne" Petipa came in 1902 when he invited Alexander Gorsky, former premier danseur to the Imperial Ballet, to stage his own version of Petipa's 1869 ballet Don Quixote. Gorsky had been engaged as Ballet Master to the Ballet of the Moscow Imperial Bolshoi Theatre, and in 1900 he mounted a complete revision of Don Quixote in a version radically different from Petipa's original. Petipa became furious when he learned this new version would be staged for the St. Peterburg troupe, as he had not even been consulted on the production of a ballet that was originally his creation. While watching a rehearsal of Gorsky's production at the Mariinsky Theatre, Petipa was heard yelling out "Will someone tell that young man that I am not yet dead?!". Petipa was further frustrated by the fact that the Imperial Theatre's newly appointed régisseur Nicholas Sergeyev was being paid large sums to travel throughout the Russian Empire and stage many of the ageing Ballet Master's works.

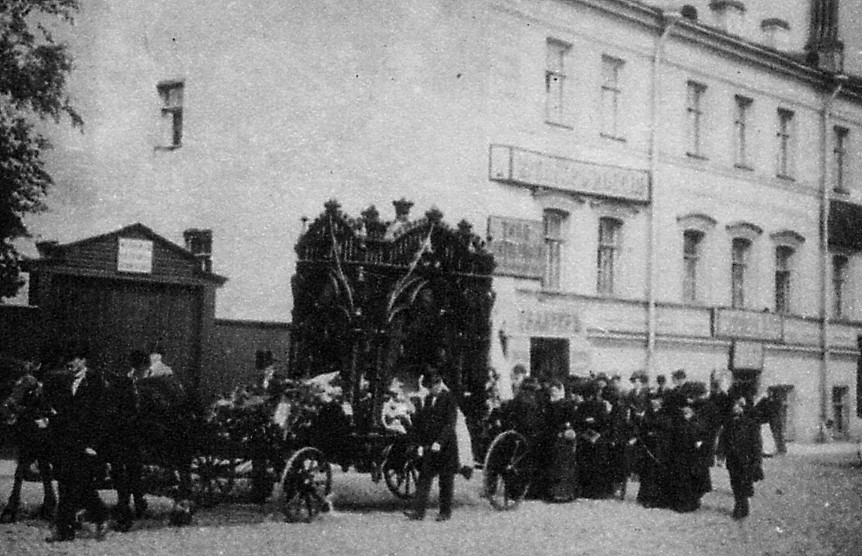
Funeral cortège for Marius Petipa, 17 July 1910, St. Petersburg, Russia

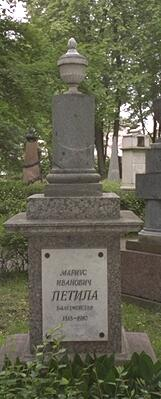
Petipa's grave in the Alexander Nevsky Monastery, St. Petersburg, Russia

In late 1902 Petipa began work on a ballet adaptation of the tale Snow White and the Seven Dwarfs titled Le Miroir magique (The Magic Mirror). Petipa mounted the work for his own benefit performance, which was to mark a "semi-retirement" for the Ballet Master. Petipa struggled with the production; he found designer Alexander Volonine's modernist décor and costumes to be discordant with the ballet's style and setting, but he struggled most of all with the music provided to him by the young avant-garde composer Arsenii Koreshchenko. Petipa felt the music to be unsuitable for classical dances and not descriptive enough for the mime and action sequences, forcing him to work very hard with the composer Koreshchenko with aid from the composer/conductor Riccardo Drigo. Le Miroir magique was first presented on 22 February [O.S. 9 February] 1903 at the Mariinsky Theatre to a full house consisting of the whole Imperial Family and the Imperial Russian aristocracy. Petipa received a roaring ovation from the audience at the end of the performance. With approval from Emperor Nicholas II himself, Petipa was given the title "Ballet Master for life" and granted a pension of 9,000 rubles per annum by the minister of the Imperial Court Baron Fredericks. Nevertheless, the production and music for Le Miroir magique was given scathing reviews in the press, though Petipa's choreography was not mentioned among the criticisms. Rumour began to circulate that Petipa was to be replaced, and Telyakovsky even made an announcement to the Stock Trade Bulletin that "...the ballet company will have to get used to a new Balletmaster – Alexander Gorsky. He will stage his own versions of 'The Little Humpbacked Horse' and 'Swan Lake'. He has staged both ballets (for the Moscow Bolshoi Theatre) entirely differently and in a much more original manner." In the end Gorsky never succeeded Petipa as premier maître de ballet. The coveted post would later go to Mikhail Fokine.

Telyakovsky knew that he could not legally end Petipa's employment, as he was still contracted as Premier maître de ballet, so he began a campaign to drive the aging Ballet Master from the theatre. In 1902 Telyakovsky established a committee of influential members of the Imperial Theatres in an effort to take away Petipa's powers with regard to casting, repertory, and the appointment of dancers, though much to Telyakovsky's annoyance the members of the committee appointed Petipa chairman. Soon Telyakovsky began purposely not sending carriages to collect Petipa for particular rehearsals, or not sending him lists of casting for various ballets, and even not informing Petipa of various rehearsals taking place, information which the Ballet Master was legally required to have. Nevertheless, Petipa's advanced age and failing health left him with little energy to contest the director. Petipa was invited in March 1904 to stage The Pharaoh's Daughter at the Paris Opéra (the Palais Garnier) by relatives of Jules-Henri Vernoy de Saint-Georges, who wrote the ballet's libretto, but his health prevented him from it.

Despite the situation with Telyakovsky and the condition of his health, Petipa still managed to work, as he was constantly sought out by the dancers of the Imperial Ballet for advice and coaching, and he even managed to revise some of the dances in his older works. In 1904 Petipa coached the great Anna Pavlova for her performances in Giselle and her début in Paquita.

Petipa's diaries reflect the constant fear of his aging body, and that he had little time left to live. In light of this, the Ballet Master spent nearly every minute he could creating variations and various numbers, as well as reworking many of the dances in his older works. In 1903 Petipa presented completely new choreography for many of the pas in his 1868 ballet Le Roi Candaule. For this revival Petipa created a new version of the celebrated Pas de Diane that would later be transformed by Agrippina Vaganova into the famous Diane and Actéon Pas de Deux. Such work prompted the Ballet Master to write in his diaries "I am amazing."

Petipa then set to work on what would prove to be his final ballet. La Romance d'un Bouton de rose et d'un Papillon to the music of Drigo was, according to Olga Preobrajenska, " ... a little masterpiece." The work was scheduled to be presented on 5 February [O.S. 23 January] 1904 for a performance at the Imperial Theatre of the Hermitage, but the director Telyakovsky abruptly cancelled the performance only two weeks before the premiere, the official explanation being the outbreak of the Russo-Japanese War.

Petipa noted what would prove to be his final composition on 1 February [O.S. 19 January] 1905 in his diaries: a variation to the music of Cesare Pugni for the Prima ballerina Olga Preobrajenska from the old ballet La Danseuse en voyage. Petipa wrote next to this entry " ... it's finished!".

== Remaining years and death ==
Petipa remained in St. Petersburg until 1907. At the suggestion of his physicians he left with his family to Yalta in southern Russia where the air was more agreeable with his health, and soon the Petipa family relocated to the resort Gurzuf in the Crimea, where the Ballet Master spent his remaining years. In 1907 Petipa wrote in his diary "I can state that I created a ballet company of which everyone said: St. Petersburg has the greatest ballet in all Europe." Petipa died on 14 July [O.S. 1 July] 1910 at the age of ninety-two, and was interred three days later in the Alexander Nevsky Monastery in St. Petersburg.

== Notation of works ==
It was in 1891 that many of Petipa's original ballets, revivals and dances from operas began to be notated in the method of dance notation created by Vladimir Stepanov.

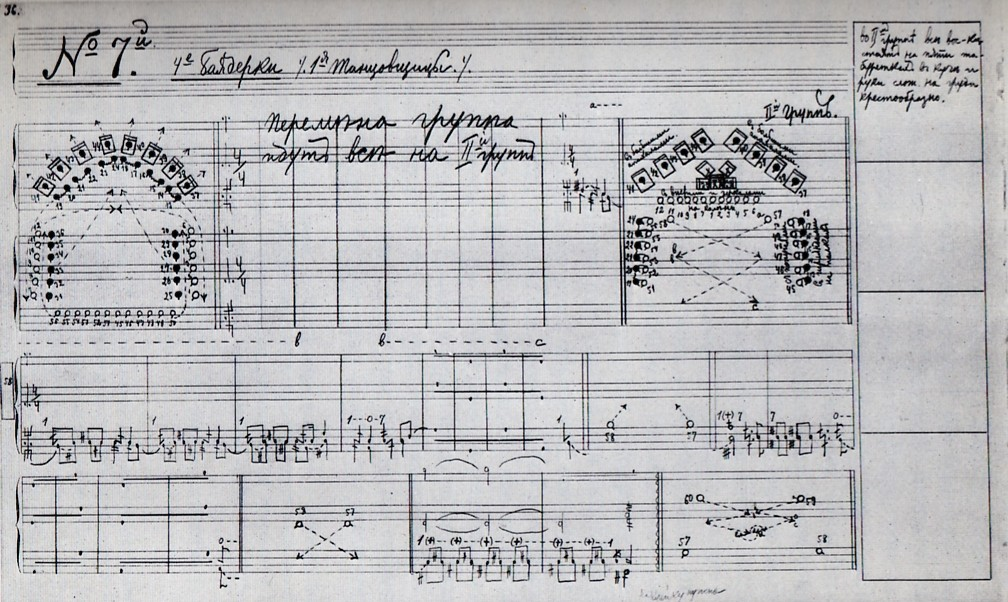
A Page of the Stepanov choreographic notation from the Sergeyev Collection for the Petipa/Minkus La Bayadère, c. 1900

After the Russian Revolution of 1917 the Imperial Ballet's régisseur Nicholas Sergeyev left Russia with the notations in hand. Throughout the 1930s Sergeyev would make his most substantial contribution to the artform of classical dance by utilizing the notated choreographies to stage Petipa's The Sleeping Beauty, his definitive version of Giselle, Coppélia (as danced by the Imperial Ballet), and The Nutcracker for the Vic-Wells Ballet of London (later the Royal Ballet). These ballets would thence spread to the rest of the world

This notation is part of a collection of materials known as the Sergeyev Collection and is held today in the archives of Harvard University's Theatre Library.

== Ballets ==
=== Nantes, France ===
- Le Droit du seigneur (1838)
- La Petite Bohémienne (1838)
- La Noce à Nantes (1838)

=== Bordeaux, France ===
- La Jolie Bordelaise (1840)
- L’Intrigue amoureuse (1841)
- La Vendange (1842)
- Le Langage des fleurs (1844)

=== Madrid, Spain ===
- Carmen et son toréro (1845)
- La Perle de Séville (1845)
- L’Aventure d’une fille de Madrid (1845)
- Départ pour la course des taureaux (1845)
- La Fleur de Grenade (1846)
- Forfasella ó la hija del infierno (1846)
- Alba-Flor la pesarosa (1847)

=== Russia ===
Imperial Bolshoi Kammeny Theatre, St. Petersburg

- Paquita (revival, after J. Mazilier). Staged with Frédéric Malevergne. Music by Edouard Deldevez and Ludvig Minkus. 8 October [O.S. 26 September] 1847.
- Le Diable amoureux (as Satanella) (revival, after J. Mazilier). Staged with Jean Petipa. Music by Napoléon Henri Reber, François Benoist and Konstantin Liadov. 22 February [O.S. 10 February] 1848.
- Léda, ou la Laitière Suisse (revival, after F. Taglioni). Staged with Jules Perrot and Jean Petipa. Music by Adalbert Gyrowetz, Michele Carafa and Cesare Pugni. 16 December [O.S. 4 December] 1849.
- Giselle (revival, after Jean Coralli and J. Perrot). Staged with Jules Perrot. Music by Adolphe Adam and Cesare Pugni. 7 February [O.S. 26 January] 1850.
- Le Corsaire (revival, after J. Mazilier). Staged with Jules Perrot. Music by Adolphe Adam and Cesare Pugni. 24 January [O.S. 12 January] 1858.
- Un Mariage sous la Régence. Music by Cesare Pugni. 30 December [O.S. 18 December] 1858.
- La Carnaval de Venise (pas de deux for Amalia Ferraris). Music by Cesare Pugni on a theme by Niccolò Paganini. 24 February [O.S. 12 February] 1859.
- Le Marché des parisien. Music by Cesare Pugni. 30 April [O.S. 18 April] 1859.
- La Somnambule (revival, after Jean-Pierre Aumer). Music by Ferdinand Hérold and Cesare Pugni. 21 December [O.S. 9 December] 1859.
- Le Dahlia Bleu. Music by Cesare Pugni. 24 April [O.S. 12 April] 1860.
- The Pharaoh's Daughter. Music by Cesare Pugni. 30 January [O.S. 18 January] 1862.
- La Beauté du Liban, ou l’Esprit des montagnes. Music by Cesare Pugni. 24 December [O.S. 12 December] 1863.
- La Danseuse en voyage (revival, after J. Perrot). Music by Cesare Pugni. 16 November [O.S. 4 November] 1865.
- Florida. Music by Cesare Pugni. 22 January [O.S. 10 January] 1866.
- Faust (revival, after J. Perrot). Music by Giacomo Panizza, Sir Michael Andrew Costa, Niccolò Bajetti and Cesare Pugni. 19 November [O.S. 7 November] 1867.
- Le Roi Candaule. Music by Cesare Pugni. 31 October [O.S. 19 October] 1868.
- Catarina (revival, after Jules Perrot). Music by Cesare Pugni. 13 November [O.S. 1 November] 1870.
- Les Deux étoiles. Music by Cesare Pugni. 12 January 1872 [O.S. 31 December 1871].
- La Camargo. Music by Ludwig Minkus. 29 December [O.S. 17 December] 1872.
- Le Papillon (revival, after M. Taglioni). Music by Ludwig Minkus. 18 January [O.S. 6 January] 1874.
- La Naïade et le Pêcheur (revival, after J. Perrot). Music by Cesare Pugni. 7 November [O.S. 26 October] 1874.
- Les Brigands. Music by Ludwig Minkus. 6 February [O.S. 25 January] 1875.
- Les Aventures de Pélée. Music by Ludwig Minkus and Léo Delibes. 30 January [O.S. 18 January] 1876.
- Le Songe d’une nuit d’été. Music by Ludwig Minkus and Felix Mendelssohn. 26 July [O.S. 14 July] 1876.
- La Bayadère. Music by Ludwig Minkus. 4 February [O.S. 23 January] 1877.
- Roxana, la beauté du Monténégro. Music by Ludwig Minkus. 10 February [O.S. 29 January] 1878.
- La Fille des Neiges. Music by Ludwig Minkus. 19 January [O.S. 7 January] 1879.
- Frisac, ou la Double Noce. Music arranged by Ludwig Minkus from the airs of Giacomo Meyerbeer, Giuseppe Verdi, Vincenzo Bellini and Gioacchino Rossini. 23 March [O.S. 11 March] 1879.
- Mlada. Music by Ludwig Minkus. 14 December [O.S. 2 December] 1879.
- La Fille du Danube (revival, after F. Taglioni). Music by Adolphe Adam and Ludwig Minkus. 8 March [O.S. 25 February] 1880.
- Zoraïa, ou la Maure en Espagne. Music by Ludwig Minkus. 13 February [O.S. 1 February] 1881.
- La Vivandière (as Markitenka) (revival, after A. Saint-Léon). Music by Cesare Pugni. 20 October [O.S. 8 October] 1881.
- Pâquerette (revival, after A. Saint-Léon). Music by François Benoist and Ludwig Minkus. 22 January [O.S. 10 January] 1882.
- Pygmalion, ou La statue de Chypre. Music by Prince Nikita Trubestkoi. 23 December [O.S. 11 December] 1883.
- Coppélia (revival, after A. Saint-Léon). Music by Léo Delibes. 7 December [O.S. 25 November] 1884.
- Le Diable à Quatre (as La Femme capricieuse) (revival, J. Mazilier). Music by Adolphe Adam, Cesare Pugni and Ludwig Minkus. 5 February [O.S. 24 January] 1885.
- La Fille Mal Gardée (as La Précaution inutile) (revival, after Paul Taglioni). Staged with Lev Ivanov and Virginia Zucchi. Music by Peter Ludwig Hertel, Ferdinand Hérold and Cesare Pugni. 27 December [O.S. 15 December] 1885.

Imperial Mariinsky Theatre, St. Petersburg

- Les Pilules magiques. Music by Ludwig Minkus. 21 February [O.S. 9 February] 1886.
- L’Ordre du Roi. Music arranged by Albert Vizentini from the airs of Johann Strauss II, Léo Delibes, Daniel Auber, Jules Massenet and Anton Rubinstein. 26 February [O.S. 14 February] 1886.
- La Esmeralda (revival, after J. Perrot). Music by Cesare Pugni. 29 December [O.S. 17 December] 1886.
- Fiametta (revival, after A. Saint-Léon). Music by Ludwig Minkus. 18 December [O.S. 6 December] 1887.
- La Vestale. Music by Mikhail Ivanov. 1 March [O.S. 18 February] 1888.
- Le Talisman. Music by Riccardo Drigo. 6 February [O.S. 25 January] 1889.
- The Sleeping Beauty. Music by Pyotr Ilyich Tchaikovsky. 15 January [O.S. 3 January] 1890.
- Nénuphar. Music by Nikolai Krotkov. 23 November [O.S. 11 November] 1890.
- Kalkabrino. Music by Ludwig Minkus. 25 February [O.S. 13 February] 1891.
- La Sylphide (revival, after F. Taglioni). Music by Jean Madeleine Schneitzhoeffer and Riccardo Drigo. 31 January [O.S. 19 January] 1892.
- The Nutcracker. Staged by Petipa and Lev Ivanov. Music by Pyotr Ilyich Tchaikovsky. 18 December [O.S. 6 December] 1892.
- Cendrillon (as Zolushka). Staged by Lev Ivanov and Enrico Cecchetti under the supervision of Petipa. Music by Baron Boris Fitinhof-Schell. 17 December [O.S. 5 December] 1893.
- Swan Lake (revival, after J. Reisinger). Staged with Lev Ivanov. Music by Pyotr Ilyich Tchaikovsky in a revision by Riccardo Drigo. 27 January [O.S. 15 January] 1895.
- The Little Humpbacked Horse (as La Tsar-Demoiselle) (revival, after A. Saint-Léon). Music by Cesare Pugni and Riccardo Drigo. 18 December [O.S. 6 December] 1895.
- La Halte de la cavalerie. Music by Johann Armsheimer. 2 February [O.S. 21 January] 1896.
- Barbe-bleue. Music by Pyotr Schenck. 20 December [O.S. 8 December] 1896.
- Raymonda. Music by Alexander Glazunov. 19 January [O.S. 7 January] 1898.
- The Magic Mirror. Music by Arseny Koreshchenko. 22 February [O.S. 9 February] 1903.

Other venues in Russia

- L’Étoile de Grenade. Music by Cesare Pugni. 21 January [O.S. 9 January] 1855. Palace of the Grand Duchess Elena Pavlovna, St. Petersburg.
- La Rose, la Violette et le Papillon. Music by Prince Pyotr Georgievich of Oldenburg. 20 October [O.S. 8 October] 1857. Estate of Prince Pyotr Georgievich of Oldenburg, Tsarskoye Selo.
- Terpsichore. Music by Cesare Pugni. 28 November [O.S. 16 November] 1861. Imperial Theatre, Tsarskoye Selo.
- Titania. Music by Cesare Pugni. 30 November [O.S. 18 November] 1866. Palace of the Grand Duchess Elena Pavlovna, St. Petersburg.
- L’Amour bienfaiteur. Music by Cesare Pugni. 18 March [O.S. 6 March] 1868. For students of the Imperial Ballet School, St. Petersburg.
- L’Esclave. Music by Cesare Pugni. 11 May [O.S. 29 April] 1869. Imperial Theatre, Tsarskoye Selo.
- Don Quixote. Music by Ludwig Minkus. 26 December [O.S. 14 December] 1869. Imperial Bolshoi Theatre, Moscow.
- Trilby. Music by Yuli Gerber. 6 February [O.S. 25 January] 1870. Imperial Bolshoi Theatre, Moscow.
- Ariadne (revival, after J. Reisinger). Music by Yuli Gerber. 26 December [O.S. 14 December] 1878. Imperial Bolshoi Theatre, Moscow.
- La Nuit et le Jour. Music by Ludwig Minkus. 30 May [O.S. 18 May] 1883. Imperial Bolshoi Theatre, Moscow. For the coronation gala of Emperor Alexander III and Empress Maria Fyodorvna.
- L’Offrande à l’Amour. Music by Ludwig Minkus. 3 August [O.S. 22 July] 1886. In honor of Empress Maria Fyodorovna. Imperial Theatre, Peterhof.
- Les Caprices du papillon. Music by Nikolai Krotkov. 17 June [O.S. 5 June] 1889. Imperial Theatre, Peterhof. For the wedding of Princess Alexandra of Greece to the Grand Duke Pavel Alexandrovich.
- La Forêt enchantée (revival, after Lev Ivanov). Music by Riccardo Drigo. 25 July [O.S. 13 July] 1889. Olga Island, Peterhof.
- Un conte de fées. Music by (?) Richter. 16 April [O.S. 4 April] 1891. For students of the Imperial Ballet School, St. Petersburg.
- Le Réveil de Flore. Music by Riccardo Drigo. 9 August [O.S. 28 July] 1894. Imperial Theatre, Peterhof. For the wedding of the Grand Duchess Xenia Alexandrovna to the Grand Duke Alexander Mikhailovich.
- La Perle. Music by Riccardo Drigo. 29 May [O.S. 17 May] 1896, Imperial Bolshoi Theatre, Moscow. For the coronation gala of Emperor Nicholas II and Empress Alexandra Fydorovna.
- Les Noces de Thétis et Pélée (one-act version of Les Aventures de Pélée). Music by Ludwig Minkus and Riccardo Drigo. 9 August [O.S. 28 July] 1897, Olga Island, Peterhof.
- Les Ruses d'Amour (or The Trial of Damis). Music by Alexander Glazunov. 30 January [O.S. 18 January] 1900. Imperial Theatre of the Hermitage, Winter Palace, St. Petersburg.
- Les Saisons. Music by Alexander Glazunov. 20 February [O.S. 8 February] 1900. Imperial Theatre of the Hermitage, Winter Palace, St. Petersburg.
- Les Millions d'Arlequin. Music by Riccardo Drigo. 23 February [O.S. 11 February] 1900. Imperial Theatre of the Hermitage, Winter Palace, St. Petersburg.
- Les Elèves de Dupré (1 act version of L’Ordre du roi). Music by Riccardo Drigo, based on the pastiche arranged by Albert Vinzentini. 27 February [O.S. 15 February] 1900. Imperial Theatre of the Hermitage, Winter Palace, St. Petersburg.
- Le Cœur de la marquise. Music by Ernest Guiraud, with spoken verse by Frédéric Febvre. 7 March [O.S. 22 February] 1902. Imperial Theatre of the Hermitage, Winter Palace, St. Petersburg.
- La Romance d'un Bouton de rose et d'un Papillon. Music by Riccardo Drigo. Never premiered (scheduled to have premiered 5 February [O.S. 23 January] 1904 at the Imperial Theatre of the Hermitage, Winter Palace, St. Petersburg).

== Cultural depictions ==
- Nights of Farewell (1965); portrayed by Gilles Ségal
- Anna Pavlova (1983); portrayed by Pyotr Gusev

== See also ==
- List of dancers
- List of Russian ballet dancers

== Sources ==
- Beaumont, Cyrl W. Complete Book of Ballets.
- Garafola, Lynn / Petipa, Marius. The Diaries of Marius Petipa. Trans, Ed., and introduction by Lynn Garafola. Published in Studies in Dance History. 3.1 (Spring 1992).
- Guest, Ivor Forbes. Jules Perrot – Master of the Romantic Ballet.
- Guest, Ivor Forbes. Letters from a Ballet Master – The Correspondence of Arthur Saint-Léon. Introduction by, and Edited by Ivor Guest.
- Nekhendzi, A. (comp.) "Marius Petipa, Materials, recollections, articles" (Marius Petipa, Materialy, vospominaniya, stat'i) Ed. Yuri Slonimsky et al. (Leningrad State Theater Museum 1971).
- Petipa, Marius. Memuary Mariusa Petipa solista ego imperatorskogo velichestva i baletmeistera imperatorskikh teatrov (The Memoirs of Marius Petipa, Soloist of His Imperial Majesty and Ballet Master of the Imperial Theatres).
- Wiley, Roland John. Dances from Russia: An Introduction to the Sergeyev Collection Published in The Harvard Library Bulletin, 24.1 January 1976.
- Wiley, Roland John, ed. and translator. A Century of Russian Ballet: Documents and Eyewitness Accounts 1810–1910.
- Wiley, Roland John. The Life and Ballets of Lev Ivanov.
- Wiley, Roland John. Tchaikovsky's Ballets.
- Biographical/analytical article on Petipa
