= Marie Petipa =

Russian ballerina (1857–1930)

Marie Petipa as Lilac Fairy in The Sleeping Beauty (circa 1890)

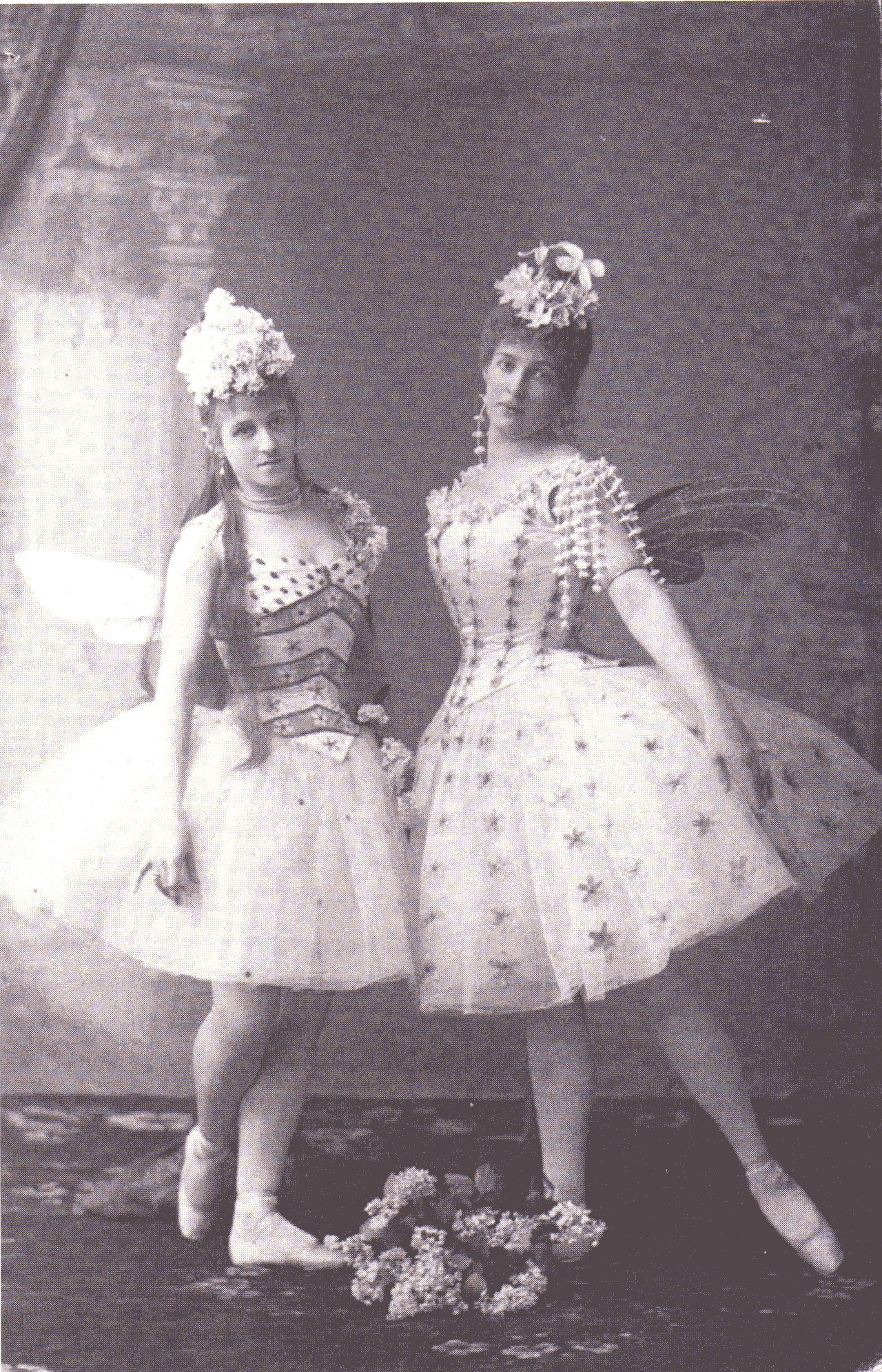
Marie Petipa as Lilac Fairy in the prologue of The Sleeping Beauty with Lyubov Vishnevskaya as an Attendant (1890)

Marie Mariusovna Petipa (Russian: Мари́я Ма́риусовна Петипа́; 29 October [O.S. 17 October] 1857 – 16 January 1930) was a Russian ballerina. She was born in Saint Petersburg and was the daughter of Marius Petipa (under whom she studied) and Maria Petipa.

== Life and career ==
Her debut was at the Mariinsky Theatre in 1875 in Le Dahlia bleu and her dancing career, mainly in the character dance repertoire, lasted until 1907, although she performed on rare occasions through 1911. She created the roles of the Lilac Fairy in The Sleeping Beauty in 1890, Princess Mlada in the opéra-ballet by Rimsky Korsakov in 1892 and a Bacchante in The Seasons in 1900.

At the height of her career, Petipa was one of the most well-known ballerinas in Saint Petersburg. Her portraits were drawn by the well-known artists (a portrait of her by Konstantin Makovsky has survived); her private life was discussed in the newspapers; and her 25th career anniversary in 1901 was widely celebrated in Saint Petersburg. Vlas Doroshevich wrote a lengthy article on this occasion, titled Goddess of Joy and Merriment (Богиня радости и веселья). Petipa went on many tours abroad and was awarded the Ordre des Palmes académiques in France.

She was in a civil marriage with the dancer Sergei Legat (1875–1905), who was much younger than her. Petipa left the stage two years after her husband committed suicide.

At the time of the October Revolution of 1917, Petipa was sixty years old. The revolution took everything away from her: she lost both her house and her pension and was left with nothing, not even money for food. She pleaded to the Soviet government for assistance but received no help. The only help came from the fellow actors, who, however, were unable to sustain her permanently. Her second plea to the government for a pension was rejected as well.

In 1928, she moved to Paris, where she lived in poor conditions. Petipa died in 1930 and was buried near Paris. The money paid for the funeral was only enough for five years, after which she was reburied in a common grave.

According to the Soviet sources, Petipa led Legat to commit suicide and then married a businessman in 1910, getting ten million francs as a result. Nevertheless, the directorate of the academic theaters petitioned to grant Petipa a pension in 1924. According to the same sources, Petipa emigrated to Paris in 1926 where she had two strokes and died of impulsive insanity.

== See also ==
- List of people from Saint Petersburg
- List of Russian ballet dancers
