= Yekaterina Vazem =

Russian ballerina (1848–1937)

Yekaterina Ottovna Vazem
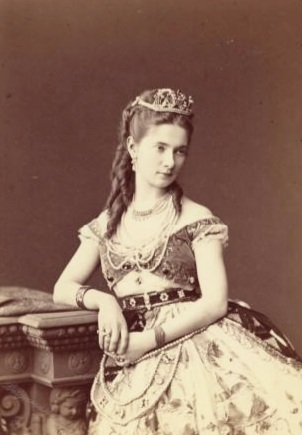
- Yekaterina Vazem costumed as Nikiya for an 1877 performance of La Bayadère
- Born: Matilda Vazem; 25 January 1848; Moscow, Russia
- Died: 14 December 1937 (aged 89); Leningrad, Soviet Union
- Occupation: Ballerina

Yekaterina Ottovna Vazem (Note: Also transliterated as Ekaterina Vazem.) (born Matilda Vazem; Russian: Екатери́на Отто́вна Ва́зем; 25 January 1848 – 14 December 1937) was a Russian prima ballerina and instructor, whose most noted pupil was the legendary Anna Pavlova. She was one of the first Russians to rival the Italian ballerinas.

== Early life ==
She was born Matilda Vazem on 25 January 1848 in Moscow, Russia. She moved to Saint Petersburg, where in 1866, she was named the best student of the Imperial Theatre School (now the Mariinsky Ballet). She graduated in 1867. From 1867 to 1884, she was a leading dancer at the St. Petersburg Bolshoi Theatre.

She became famous for first dancing the role of Nikiya in Marius Petipa's ballet, La Bayadère (1877). She went on to become the teacher of legendary prima ballerina Anna Pavlova.

== La Bayadère ==
During the mid-to-late 19th century, Russian ballet was dominated by foreign artists, though during the late 1860s through the early 1880s, the theatre administration encouraged the promotion of native talent. Vazem – a terre-à-terre virtuosa – climbed the ranks of the Imperial Ballet to become one of the company's most celebrated dancers. Despite being a benefit performance for Vazem, with tickets being more expensive than for the opera, the first performance of La Bayadère played to a full house. At the end of the performance the audience applauded for more than half an hour. Reviews were uniformly complimentary although they did register complaints of Petipa's license in dealing with historical facts. They also dwelt on the unavoidable mishaps that befall most first performances. For example, in the Kingdom of the Shades scene, the appearance of a magic palace was mistimed and delayed until after Nikiya had turned to face it.

== Later life and death ==
Vazem retired in 1884 but continued to teach at the Imperial Theatre School from 1886 to 1896. Among her most notable students were Anna Pavlova, Agrippina Vaganova, and Vera Trefilova. She then taught privately and became a writer. She died on 14 December 1937 in Leningrad.

== Mémoires ==
She authored a book of mémoires dictated to her son, entitled Записки балерины Санкт-Петербургского Большого театра. 1867–1884 ("Memoirs of a Ballerina of the St. Petersburg Bolshoi Theatre").

== See also ==
- List of Russian ballet dancers

== Sources ==
- Craine, Debra; Mackrell, Judith (19 August 2010). "Vazem, Ekaterina". The Oxford Dictionary of Dance. OUP Oxford. p. 469. ISBN 978-0-19-956344-9.
