= Mariia Surovshchikova-Petipa =

Russian prima ballerina

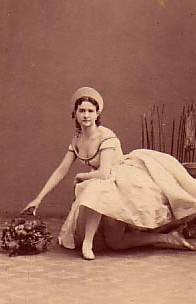
- Surovshchikova-Petipa in Le Diable à Quatre, ca. 1861
- Born: February 27, 1836; St. Petersburg, Russian Empire
- Died: March 16, 1882 (aged 46); Pyatigorsk, Russian Empire
- Occupation: Prima ballerina
- Spouse: Marius Petipa (m. 1854; sep. 1869)

Mariia Sergeyevna Surovshchikova-Petipa (27 February 1836 – 16 March 1882) was prima ballerina to the St. Petersburg Imperial Theatres and wife of the noted choreographer Marius Petipa.

== Life ==
Mariia Sergeyevna Surovshchikova was born in St. Petersburg, the illegitimate daughter of a milliner. She studied at the St. Petersburg Imperial Ballet School, graduating in 1854. After her graduation from the institute she entered into the corps de ballet of the Imperial Bolshoi Kamenny Theatre, and in 1854 married Marius Petipa, who at that time served as premier danseur to the St. Petersburg Imperial Theatres. Upon her marriage she took the name of Surovshchikova-Petipa.

Her rise to the rank of Ballerina coincided with Petipa's own rise from fledgling choreographer to ballet Master of the Imperial Theatres. As Petipa was given more and more opportunities to stage his own early works, it was Surovshchikova-Petipa who danced the principal roles. Petipa also revived many already-existing ballets for her, including Joseph Mazilier's Le Corsaire in 1863.

She had one daughter and one son—Marie Mariusovna Petipa (1857–1930), the noted ballerina and character dancer who danced in many of her father's works, and Jean Mariusovich Petipa (1859–1871).

Upon her retirement she became an actress with the Alexandrinsky Theatre in St. Petersburg, performing in the plays of Pushkin, among others. In 1875 Petipa and Surovshchikova-Petipa divorced. She died in 1882 of virulent smallpox in Pyatigorsk, Russia.

== See also ==
- List of Russian ballet dancers
