= Bolshoi Theatre, Saint Petersburg =

Coordinates: 59°55′33″N 30°17′53″E

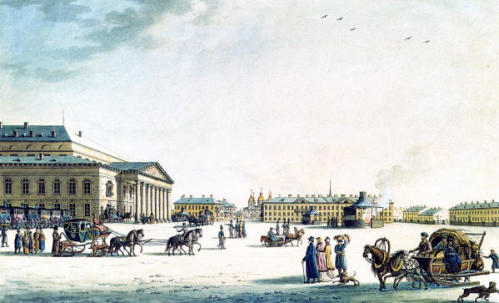
Theatre Square in 1806, by Benjamin Patersen.

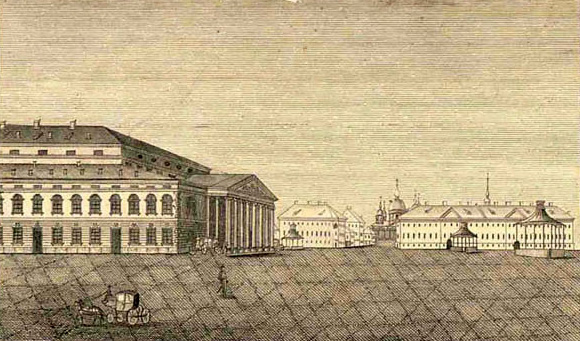
Bolshoi Kamenny Theatre from the 1825 ″Illustrated Map of the Capital City of Saint Petersburg″

The Saint Petersburg Imperial Bolshoi Kamenny Theatre (The Big Stone Theatre of Saint Petersburg, Russian: Большой Каменный Театр) was a theatre in Saint Petersburg.

It was built in 1783 to Antonio Rinaldi's Neoclassical design as the Kamenny (i.e., Stone) Theatre; Giovanni Paisiello’s opera Il mondo della luna was performed at the opening on 24 September. It was rebuilt in 1802 according to the designs of the architect Thomas de Thomon and renamed the Bolshoi, but burned down in 1811. The building was restored in 1818, and modified between 1826 and 1836 by Alberto Cavos to accommodate more modern machinery.

Until 1886, the Bolshoi Kamenny Theatre was principal theatre for both the Imperial Ballet and the Imperial Russian Opera.

In 1886 the building was declared unsafe and, at the behest of the theatre director Ivan Vsevolozhsky, the ballet and opera performances moved to the Imperial Mariinsky Theatre, where they have remained ever since. The Imperial Bolshoi Kamenny Theatre was then torn down to make way for the new Saint Petersburg Conservatory.

== Notable premieres ==
Operas

- A Life for the Tsar (1836) – Mikhail Glinka
- Ruslan and Lyudmila (1842) – Mikhail Glinka
- La forza del destino (1862) – Giuseppe Verdi

Ballets

- The Pharaoh's Daughter (1862) – chor. Marius Petipa, mus. Cesare Pugni
- The Beauty of Lebanon or The Mountain Spirit chor. by Marius Petipa mus. Cesare Pugni.
- The Little Humpbacked Horse (1864) – chor. Arthur Saint-Léon, mus. Cesare Pugni
- La Bayadère (1877) – chor. Marius Petipa, mus. Ludwig Minkus
