= Filippo Taglioni =

Italian dancer and choreographer (1777–1871)

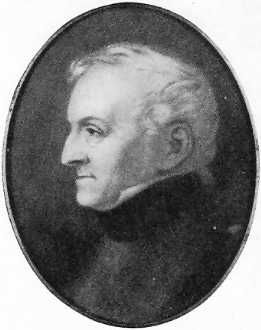
- Taglioni, c. 1820
- Born: 5 November 1777; Milan
- Died: 11 February 1871 (aged 93); Como, Italy
- Occupation(s): ballet dancer, choreographer, teacher
- Known for: La Sylphide
- Spouse: Sophie Karsten
- Children: Marie Taglioni, Paul Taglioni
- Parent: Carlo Taglioni
- Relatives: Salvatore Taglioni (brother)

Filippo Taglioni (also known as Philippe Taglioni; 5 November 1777 – 11 February 1871) was an Italian dancer and choreographer and personal teacher to his own daughter, Romantic ballerina Marie Taglioni. (He had another child who also danced ballet, Paul Taglioni.) Also, although August Bournonville's version is better known, it was Taglioni who was the original choreographer of La Sylphide, in 1832.

== Biography ==
Born in Milan to father Carlo Taglioni, he received his dance training predominantly with Carlo Blasis and Jean-François Coulon. He made his dancing debut at age 17 in Pisa performing female roles. He danced in other Italian cities before becoming a dancer (at age 22) with the Paris Opera. With Vestris firmly in control there, he readily accepted an invitation to be a principal dancer and ballet master for the Royal Swedish Ballet in Stockholm, Sweden.

In Stockholm, he married the dancer Sophie Karsten, daughter of a famous Swedish opera singer Christoffer Christian Karsten and the Polish actress Sophie Stebnowska, in 1803. Together, they had two children, Marie Taglioni and Paul Taglioni, both of whom became dancers themselves.

For several years the family lived in Vienna and Germany but to escape the dangers of the Napoleonic wars, Filippo moved them to Paris. He danced and choreographed throughout Europe, mostly in Italy, Austria, Sweden, Denmark, and Germany. Finally, he was invited to take a more permanent position with the Theater am Kärntnertor in Vienna.

Once settled in Vienna, he sent for Marie, who had been studying ballet in Paris. Upon her arrival, Filippo was discouraged by her artistic progress and began training her himself. He had her practice ballet six hours a day for six months, using a level method of technique training. He was very strict with her, and had no sympathy for her aching and bleeding toes. He sought to make her style light and delicate, with an emphasis on jumps with ballon and pointe work, something that was unheard of before this time. When she was ready he took her back to Paris.

After Marie's professional debut she became so popular that Filippo was able to negotiate a six-year contract for the two of them. The triumphant première of La Sylphide on 12 March 1832, made her the most acclaimed prima ballerina of the Romantic period and him the most renowned choreographer of the day. It is said that the great Romantic period of dance was ushered in on that night. Because of this immense success, the two of them traveled widely together and toured both Europe and Russia.

As he grew older, he became eccentric and unpredictable, and eventually lost all of Marie's carefully amassed fortune in unwise speculations. Nevertheless, he must be recognized as a pioneer in a ballet style that was to alter forever the very nature of the art.

Taglioni died in Como, Italy on 5 February 1871, at the age of 93.

== Misconceptions about La Sylphide ==
The ballet-going public knows the Romantic ballet La Sylphide as being choreographed by the Danish ballet master August Bournonville. That is indeed the La Sylphide audiences are most familiar with today but was not the version given in 1832.

The original production of La Sylphide was first presented by the Paris Opera Ballet at the Salle Le Peletier in 1832, and was choreographed by Filippo Taglioni himself to the music of Jean Madeleine Schneitzhoeffer, with libretto by Adolphe Nourrit after a story by Charles Nodier. The leading roles were danced by Marie Taglioni and Joseph Mazilier.

Bournonville originally intended to stage the 1832 version in Denmark, but the Paris Opéra demanded too high a price for the orchestral parts of Schneitzhoeffer's score. In light of this, Bournonville decided to stage his own version of La Sylphide on the same scenario, with a new score by Herman Severin Løvenskiold. The production premiered in 1836 with the prodigy Lucile Grahn and Bournonville in the principal roles. Due to the strong tradition of the Royal Danish Ballet this version is still being performed in Denmark to this day, and has since been staged throughout the world.

In 1972 the ballet master Pierre Lacotte revived Filippo Talgioni's original La Sylphide for the Paris Opera Ballet, with the noted ballerina Ghislaine Thesmar as the Sylph. Schneitzhoeffer's original score was reconstructed from a manuscript held at the Bibliothèque nationale de France. As Taglioni's original choreography was lost long ago, Lacotte choreographed the ballet in the style of the epoch. The Paris Opera Ballet has since released the production onto DVD/video twice.

== Works ==
1830: Le Dieu et la bayadère

1832: La Sylphide

1833: La Révolte au sérail

1836: La Fille du Danube

1838: La Gitana

1839: L'Ombre

1840: Le Lac des fées

1841: Aglaë, ou L'Elève de l'amour

1852 : Satanella oder Metamorphosen based on The Devil in Love (novel)

== Bibliography ==
- Bruno Ligore (ed.), Filippo Taglioni padre del ballo romantico, Rome, Aracne, 2023, ISBN 979-1221810462.
- Marie Taglioni, Souvenirs. Le manuscrit inédit de la grande danseuse romantique, édition établie, présentée et annotée par Bruno Ligore, Gremese, 2017, ISBN 978-2366771169.
- Madison U. Sowell, Debra H. Sowell, Francesca Falcone, Patrizia Veroli, Icônes du ballet romantique. Marie Taglioni et sa famille, Gremese, 2016, ISBN 978-2366770766.

Preceded by Louis Gallodier	Director of the Royal Swedish Ballet; 1803–1804	Succeeded by Federico Nadi Terrade
Preceded by Louis Deland	Director of the Royal Swedish Ballet; 1817–1818	Succeeded by Louis Deland
