= Carstens (disambiguation) =

Carstens may refer to:

- Carstens, surname
- Carstens Publications, American publisher of books and magazines related to the railroad and airplane hobby fields
- Carstens Shoal, almost circular shoal lying just north of East Budd Island in Holme Bay

== See also ==
- Carsten (disambiguation)
- Karstens (disambiguation)
