= Emma Livry =

French ballerina (1842–1863)

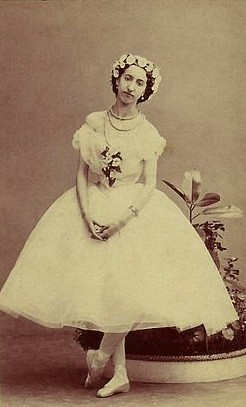
- Livry in the title role of the Taglioni/Schneitzhoeffer La Sylphide. Paris, 1862
- Born: Jeanne Emma Emarot or Emma Marie Emarot (disputed); 24 September 1842; France
- Died: 26 July 1863 (aged 20); Neuilly-sur-Seine, France
- Occupation: danseuse
- Years active: 1858–1863
- Known for: La Sylphide, other romantic ballets
- Father: Baron Charles de Chassiron

Emma Livry (born as Jeanne Emma Emarot or Emma Marie Emarot; 24 September 1842 – 26 July 1863) was a French ballerina who was one of the last ballerinas of the Romantic ballet era and a protégée of Marie Taglioni. She died from complications after burn injuries sustained when her costume caught fire during a rehearsal.

== Biography ==
Livry was the illegitimate daughter of Célestine Emarot, a ballet dancer, and Baron Charles de Chassiron, which prompted the following rhyming verse:

Can so skinny a rat
Be the daughter of so round a cat?

=== Career ===
She studied dancing under Madame Dominique and attended the Paris Opera School. Her career was promoted by her mother's lover at the time, Vicomte Ferdinand de Montguyon. On 19 October 1858, at the age of sixteen, she made her debut with the Paris Opera Ballet at the Salle Le Peletier as the sylph in La Sylphide. Her talent brought her fame and she became a widely respected ballerina.

Montguyon prevailed upon the director of the Opera to change the programme so that Marie Taglioni (who originated the role) would see Livry in La Sylphide when she visited. Taglioni decided to stay on in Paris to teach the girl, who reminded her of herself as a young woman. She choreographed for Livry the title-role of Farfalla (Butterfly) in Le Papillon, the only full-length ballet composed by Jacques Offenbach. The sculptor Jean-Auguste Barre created a figurine of Livry in this role in bronze and bisque versions.

Paul Smith wrote in Revue et gazette musicale de Paris:

She was so ethereal, and diaphanous, an intangible artist imperative, an artist with ballon .... Mlle. Livry had a ballon which has never been equalled – she bounds and leaps as no one else could do. She skims over the ground, the water and the flowers, apparently without touching them. Shims like feather and falls like a snowflake.

=== Accidental death ===
On 15 November 1862, Livry was rehearsing the title role of Fenella, a mime part and the title role in Auber's opera La muette de Portici. Making her second-act entrance, she shook out her skirts, which caught fire on a gaslight. The accident was avoidable: a method of fire-proofing costumes was available in this period, but Livry and most female performers of the period were opposed to it because it discolored and stiffened fabrics. In flames, she ran across the stage three times before she was caught and the fire extinguished with the help of firemen and other dancers. Her burns were more extensive than deep. She had clasped the burning fabric to her torso out of modesty.

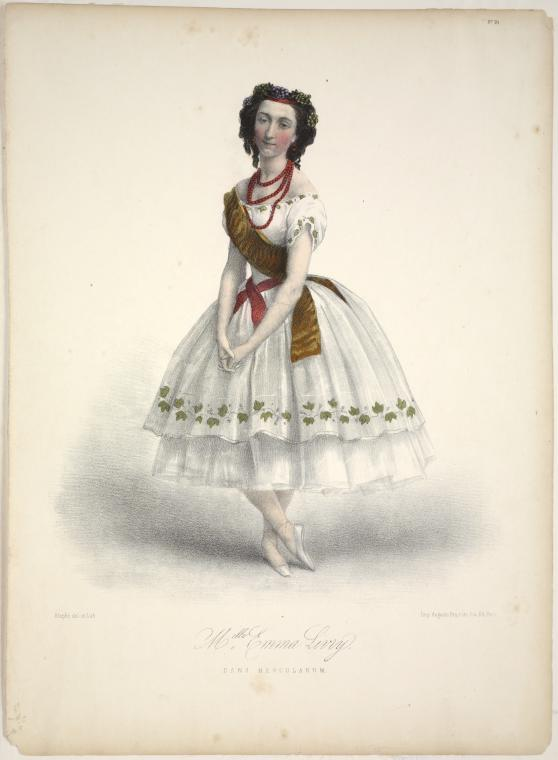
Emma Livry in Herculanum

Her face and breasts were undamaged. According to the doctor in attendance, her thighs, waist, back, shoulders and arms were burned, and her stays were burned on. She tried to pray. Taglioni, who was watching the rehearsal, rubbed make-up grease into her wounds in the mistaken belief that it would act as ointment.

She suffered for months, yet remained opposed to fire-proofed skirts: "Yes, they are, as you say, less dangerous, but should I ever return to the stage, I would never think of wearing them – they are so ugly." In 1863, she was moved from her home in Paris to Neuilly-sur-Seine. Her wounds re-opened and she succumbed to septicæmia. Montguyon was with her when she died. She was only 20 years old.

After a funeral at Notre Dame de Lorette in Paris, she was buried in the Cimetière de Montmartre.

The surviving scraps of her costume can be seen in the Musée de l'Opéra in Paris.
