= Karsten =

- Gender: Male

Origin
- Language: Latin
- Meaning: Anointed one, follower of Christ

Other names
- Related names: Christian

Karsten or Carsten is both a masculine given name and a surname. The name means “anointed.” This name is derived from a Low German form of Christian,; it can also be used to mean "man from karst". Notable persons with the name include:

== Given name ==
Carsten

- Carsten Becker (born 1990), German politician
- Carsten Breuer (born 1964), German Army general
- Carsten Höller (born 1961), German artist
- Carsten Jancker (born 1974), German football player and coach
- Carsten Lichtlein (born 1980), German handball player
- Carsten Niebuhr (1733–1815), German mathematician, cartographer, and explorer in the service of Denmark
- Carsten Pohl (born 1965), German basketball coach
- Carsten Charles Sabathia (born 1980), American baseball player
- Carsten Schatz (born 1970), German historian and politician
- Carsten Schneider (born 1976), German politician
- Carsten Träger (1973–2026), German politician
- Carsten Vissering (born 1997), American bobsledder

Karsten

- Karsten Alnæs (born 1938), Norwegian author, historian, and journalist
- Karsten Andersen (1920–1997), Norwegian conductor
- Big Daddy Karsten (born 1989), 2017 Eurovision Jury List; Norwegian Pre-select for Eurovision (Melodi Grand Prix 2021)
- Karsten Buer (1913–1993), Norwegian harness coach
- Karsten Fonstad (1900–1970), Norwegian politician
- Karsten Forsterling (born 1980), Australian rower
- Karsten Isachsen (1944–2016), Norwegian Lutheran priest, essayist and public speaker
- Karsten Jakobsen (1928–2019), Norwegian engineer
- Karsten Johannessen (1925–2018), Norwegian footballer and coach
- Karsten Kroon (born 29 January 1976), Dutch former professional road bicycle racer
- Karsten Solheim (1911–2000), Norwegian-born American golf club designer and businessman
- Karsten Stolz (1964–2025), German shot putter
- Karsten Warholm (born 1996), Norwegian track athlete
- Karsten Wettberg (1941–2026), German football manager

== Surname ==
- Adrian Karsten (1960–2005), American college football reporter
- Calvin Carsten (1915–1992), American politician from Nebraska
- Christoffer Christian Karsten (1756–1827), Swedish opera singer
- Ekaterina Karsten (born 1972), Belarusian Olympic rower
- Elisabeth Charlotta Karsten (1783–1856), Swedish painter
- Elke Karsten (born 1995), Argentine handball player
- Frank Karsten (born 1984), Dutch Magic: The Gathering player
- Frank M. Karsten (1913–1992), American politician
- George Karsten (1863–1937), German botanist
- Gustav Karl Wilhelm Hermann Karsten (1817–1908), German botanist and geologist
- Gustav Karsten (1820–1900), German physicist
- Kai Karsten (born 1968), German Olympic sprinter
- Karl Johann Bernhard Karsten (1782–1853), German mineralogist
- Karl G. Karsten (1891–1968), American economist, statistician and businessman
- Petter Adolf Karsten (1834–1917), Finnish mycologist
- Sophie Karsten (1783–1862), Swedish dancer and artist
- Sophie Mariane Karsten (1753–1848), Polish opera singer
- Thomas Karsten (1885–1945), Dutch engineer
- Wenceslaus Johann Gustav Karsten (1732–1787), German mathematician

== See also ==
- MV Carsten
- Carlsten (name)
- Carstens
- Karstens (disambiguation)
