= Karsten (disambiguation) =

Karsten may refer to:

- Karsten, both a given name and a surname.
- Karsten (fish), genus of fish in the family Oxudercidae.
- Karsten Creek, a golf club located near Stillwater, Oklahoma

== See also ==
- Carsten (disambiguation)
- Karstens (disambiguation)
