= Théâtre National de l'Opéra =

Théâtre National de l'Opéra may refer to:

- Paris Opera, an opera company with former official title Théâtre National de l'Opéra
- Salle Le Peletier, a theatre used by Théâtre National de l'Opéra 1870–1873
- Palais Garnier, a theatre used by Théâtre National de l'Opéra 1875–1939
