= Pierre Lacotte =

French ballet dancer and choreographer (1932–2023)

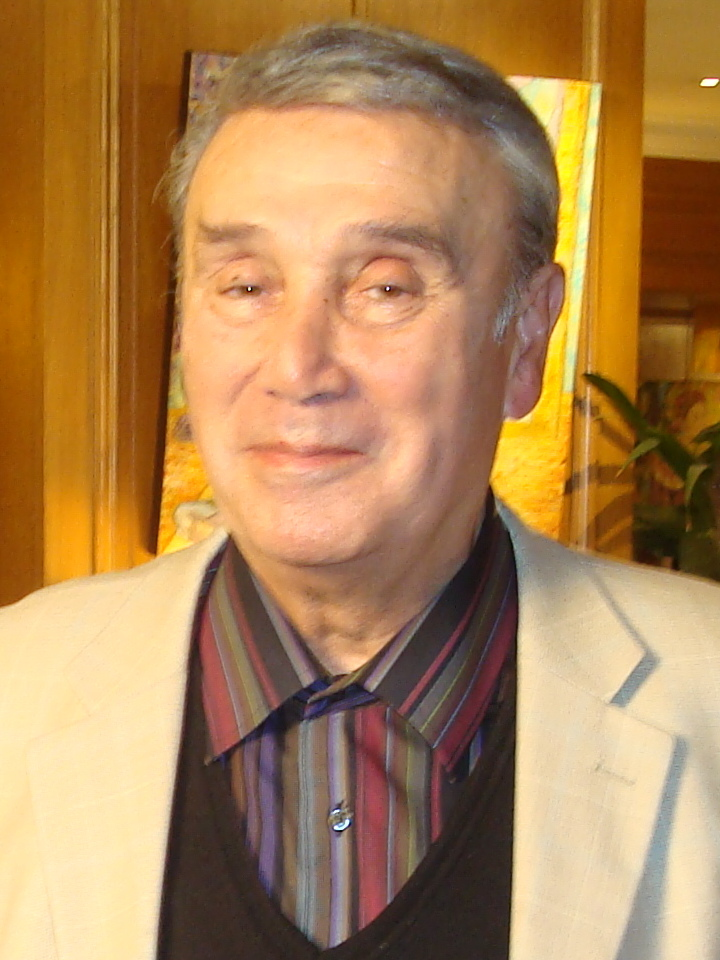
- Lacotte in 2009
- Born: 4 April 1932; Chatou, France
- Died: 10 April 2023 (aged 91); La Seyne-sur-Mer, France
- Education: Paris Opera Ballet School
- Occupations: Ballet dancer; ballet teacher; choreographer; company director
- Organizations: Paris Opera Ballet
- Spouse: Ghislaine Thesmar (m. 1968)

Pierre Lacotte (4 April 1932 – 10 April 2023) was a French ballet dancer, choreographer, teacher, and company director. He specialised in the reconstruction of lost choreographies of romantic ballets.

== Early life ==
Lacotte was born on 4 April 1932, his mother was a musician. As a child, he was interested in dance, and his family reluctantly allowed him to train under Gustave Ricaux. In 1942, he entered the Paris Opera Ballet School, where he was taught by Ricaux, Serge Lifar, and Carlotta Zambelli. He also received private training with Lyubox Yegorova, Rousanne Sarkissian, and Nicolas Zverev. He graduated in 1946.

== Career ==
Lacotte joined the Paris Opera Ballet in 1946. In 1950, he originated a major role in Lifar's Septuor. He rose through the ranks, reaching the position of premier danseur in 1953. In 1954, he choreographed his first major work, La Nuit Est une Sorcière, to music by Sidney Bechet, for Belgian television. The following year, hoping to pursue a career in choreography, he left the Paris Opera Ballet and formed his own company, Les Ballets de la Tour Eiffel. Between 1956 and 1957, he was a principal dancer with Metropolitan Opera Ballet in New York. He then returned to Europe to perform with various troupes as a guest artist. Following a serious injury in 1959, he reestablished Les Ballets de la Tour Eiffel. In 1961, he assisted Rudolf Nureyev's defection from the Soviet Union to the West.

Between 1963 and 1968, Lacotte served as the director of the newly founded Ballet National Jeunesses Musicales de France, where he also danced and choreographed. Many of his ballets created there starred Ghislaine Thesmar, the company's ballerina and later his wife. Several of his works during this time were televised. In 1966, Lacotte also guest choreographed at Ballet Rambert in London, where he created Intermede and Numeros.

In 1970, Lacotte made his first attempt at reconstructing choreography based on historical record, a pas de deux from Donizetti's 1840 opera La favorite, for a production of the opera at Teatro La Fenice, Venice. The following year, he reconstructed Filippo Taglioni's La Sylphide, originally made for the Paris Opera Ballet in 1832, based on historical documents. The reconstruction was first seen in French television, with Thesmar in the titular role. This was one of the great triumphs in Lacotte's career, and he was soon invited to mount the production at the Paris Opera Ballet. He would later also stage the production across the world. He also began teaching at the Paris Opera Ballet School in 1972.

In 1975, for the Paris Opera Ballet, Lacotte revived the ballet Coppélia with original choreography by Arthur Saint-Léon, which had not been seen at the Opera since 1870. The following year, he remounted Marie Taglioni's only ballet, Le papillon (1860). These two works also marked Lacotte's final stage appearances. By the mid-1970s, Lacotte became a leading authority in nineteenth-century ballets. He reconstructed Saint-Léon's pas de six from La Vivandière (1844) for Opéra-Comique, Filippo Taglioni's La fille du Danube (1836) for Teatro Colón. In 1978, he mounted a production of Giselle for Ballet du Rhin, based on the original 1841 production choreographed by Jules Perrot and Jean Coralli, and a 1884 production by Marius Petipa.

In 1979, Lacotte worked as a guest artist in Russia, bringing La Sylphide to the Novosibirsk Ballet, and Le Papillon, La Vivandière, and "La Cachucha" from Le Diable boiteux to Kirov Ballet. In 1981, he mounted Joseph Mazilier Marco Spada for the Rome Opera Ballet. In 1987, he revived Taglioni's Ballet of the Nuns from Meyerbeer's opera Robert le diable (1831).

In 1985, Lacotte and Thesmar were invited by the royal family of Monaco to revive Les Ballets de Monte-Carlo. The two served as joint directors until 1988, and Lacotte staged some of his works there. Lacotte then became the director of the opera ballet in Verona, Italy. He returned to France in 1991 to serve as the artistic director of Ballet National de Nancy et de Lorraine, succeeding Patrick Dupond. In 1993, he reconstructed Taglioni's L'Ombre there. He left the post in 1999.

In 2000, Lacotte revived The Pharaoh's Daughter for the Bolshoi Ballet. The following year, he reconstructed the full-length Paquita for the Paris Opera Ballet. In 2006, he mounted Jules Perrot's Ondine (1843) for the Mariinsky Ballet. In 2010, Lacotte choreographed an original ballet, Les Trois Mousquetaires, based on Alexandre Dumas's novel The Three Musketeers.

In 2021, Lacotte choreographed his final ballet, Le Rouge et Le Noir, for the Paris Opera Ballet. Based on Stendhal's novel The Red and the Black, the ballet is the company's first new full-length narrative ballet in the classical ballet style in a decade. Lacotte also designed the costumes and sets.

== Personal life and death ==
In 1968, Lacotte married fellow dancer Ghislaine Thesmar.

Lacotte lived in Paris. He died of sepsis on 10 April 2023, six days after his 91st birthday.

== See also ==
- Western stereotype of the male ballet dancer
