= La Sylphide =

Ballet dance

La Sylphide ([la sil.fid]; lit. 'The Female Sylph'; Danish: Sylfiden) is a romantic ballet in two acts. There were two versions of the ballet; the original choreographed by Filippo Taglioni in 1832, and a second version choreographed by August Bournonville in 1836. Bournonville's is the only version known to have survived and is one of the world's oldest surviving ballets.

== Taglioni version ==
La Sylphide
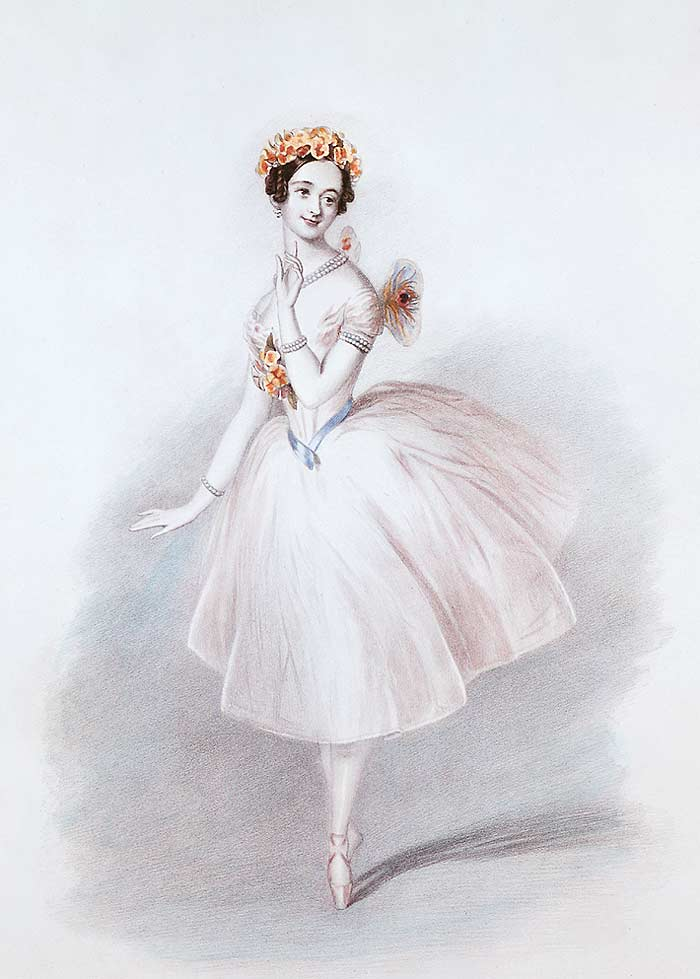
- Marie Taglioni in La Sylphide
- Choreographer: Filippo Taglioni
- Music: Jean-Madeleine Schneitzhoeffer
- Libretto: Adolphe Nourrit
- Based on: Charles Nodier's Trilby, ou Le Lutin d'Argail
- Premiere: 12 March 1832; Salle Le Peletier, Paris Opera, Paris, France
- Original ballet company: Paris Opera Ballet
- Characters: James Ruben; The Sylph; Gurn; Effie; Old Madge; Effie's mother
- Setting: Scotland
- Created for: Marie Taglioni and Joseph Mazilier
- Genre: Romantic ballet

On 12 March 1832 the first version of La Sylphide premiered at the Salle Le Peletier of the Paris Opéra with choreography by the groundbreaking Italian choreographer Filippo Taglioni and music by Jean-Madeleine Schneitzhoeffer.

Taglioni designed the work as a showcase for his daughter Marie. La Sylphide was the first ballet where dancing en pointe had an aesthetic rationale and was not merely an acrobatic stunt, often involving ungraceful arm movements and exertions, as had been the approach of dancers in the late 1820s. Marie was known for shortening her skirts in the performance of La Sylphide (to show off her excellent pointe work), which was considered highly scandalous at the time.

The ballet's libretto was written by tenor Adolphe Nourrit, the first "Robert" in Meyerbeer's Robert Le Diable, an opera which featured Marie Taglioni in its dance section, Ballet of the Nuns. Nourrit's scenario was loosely based on a story by Charles Nodier, Trilby, ou Le Lutin d'Argail, but swapped the genders of the protagonists — a goblin and a fisherman's wife of Nodier; a sylph and a farmer in the ballet.

The scene of Old Madge's witchcraft which opens Act II of the ballet was inspired by Niccolò Paganini's Le Streghe, which in its turn was inspired by a scene of witches from Il Noce di Benevento (The Walnut Tree of Benevento), an 1812 ballet by choreographer Salvatore Viganò and composer Franz Xaver Süssmayr.

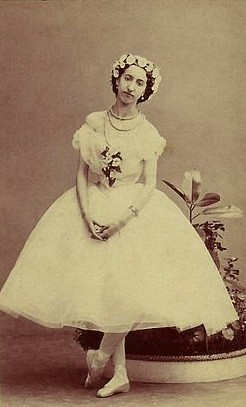
Emma Livry in the title role of the Taglioni/Schneitzhoeffer La Sylphide. Paris, 1862

=== Revivals ===
Emma Livry, one of the last ballerinas of the Romantic ballet era, made her debut with the Paris Opera Ballet as the sylph in an 1858 production of La Sylphide. When Marie Taglioni (who had retired in 1847) saw Livry in the role, she stayed on in Paris to teach the girl, who reminded her of herself as a young woman.

In 1892, Marius Petipa mounted a revival of Taglioni's original La Sylphide for the Imperial Ballet, with additional music by Riccardo Drigo. A variation Drigo composed for the ballerina Varvara Nikitina in Petipa's version is today the traditional solo danced by the lead ballerina of the famous Paquita Grand Pas Classique.

In 1972, a new version of La Sylphide, based on the Taglioni version, was choreographed and staged by Pierre Lacotte for the Paris Opera Ballet. Since Taglioni's choreography has been irretrievably lost, Lacotte's choreography is based on prints, notes, drawings, and archival materials from the era of the ballet's premiere. Lacotte's choreography is in the style of the period, but entirely new and has been criticised by some as inauthentic. Interpreters of the role of Lacotte's version at the Opera National de Paris include Ghislaine Thesmar (Lacotte's wife) and Aurelie Dupont. Both artists have recorded their work on DVD and video.

== Bournonville version ==
La Sylphide
- Choreographer: August Bournonville
- Music: Herman Severin Løvenskiold
- Libretto: Adolphe Nourrit
- Based on: Charles Nodier's "Trilby, ou Le lutin d'Argail"
- Premiere: 28 November 1836; Royal Danish Theatre, Copenhagen, Denmark
- Original ballet company: Royal Danish Ballet
- Characters: James Ruben; The Sylph; Gurn; Effie; Old Madge; Effie's mother
- Setting: Scotland
- Created for: Lucile Grahn and August Bournonville
- Genre: Romantic ballet

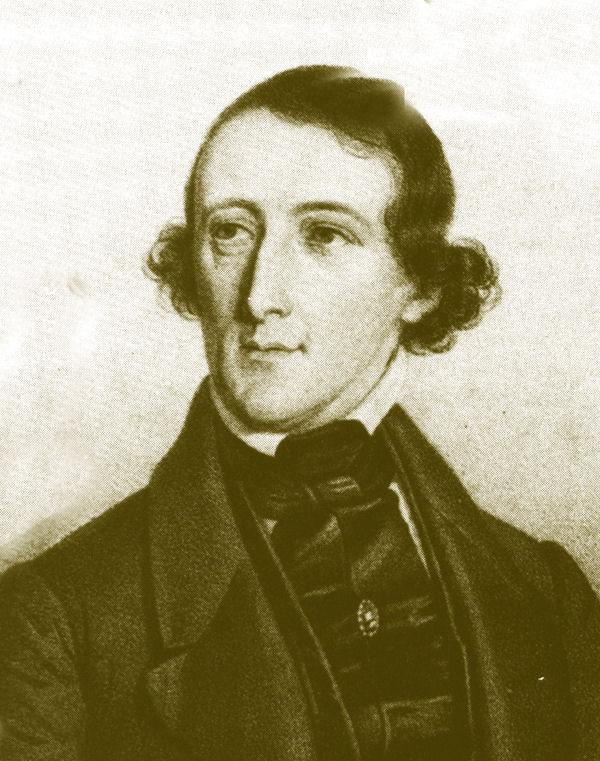
August Bournonville in 1841.

The Danish ballet master August Bournonville had intended to present a revival of Taglioni's original version in Copenhagen with the Royal Danish Ballet, but the Paris Opera demanded too high a price for Schneitzhoeffer's score. In the end, Bournonville mounted his own production of La Sylphide based on the original libretto, with music by Herman Severin Løvenskiold. The premiere took place on 28 November 1836, with the prodigy Lucile Grahn and Bournonville in the principal roles.

The Bournonville version has been danced in its original form by the Royal Danish Ballet ever since its creation and remains one of Bournonville's most celebrated works. Modern interpreters of Bournonville's version include Eva Evdokimova and Lis Jeppesen, whose performance is recorded on DVD.

== Synopsis ==
=== Act 1 ===
In the hall of a Scottish farmhouse, James Ruben, a young Scotsman, sleeps in a chair by the fireside. A sylph gazes lovingly upon him and dances about his chair. She kisses him and then vanishes when he suddenly wakes. James rouses his friend Gurn from sleep, and questions him about the sylph. Gurn denies having seen such a creature and reminds James that he is shortly to be married. James dismisses the incident and promises to forget it.

James' bride-to-be, Effie, arrives with her mother and bridesmaids. James dutifully kisses her, but is startled by a shadow in the corner. Thinking his sylph has returned, he rushes over, only to find the witch, Old Madge, kneeling at the hearth to warm herself. James is furious with disappointment.

Effie and her friends beg Old Madge to tell their fortunes, and the witch complies. She gleefully informs Effie that James loves someone else and she will be united with Gurn. James is furious. He forces Madge from the hearth and throws her out of the house. Effie is delighted that James would tangle with a witch for her sake.

Effie and her bridesmaids hurry upstairs to prepare for the wedding, and James is left alone in the room. As he stares out the window, the sylph materializes before him and confesses her love. She weeps at his apparent indifference. James resists at first, but, captivated by her ethereal beauty, capitulates and kisses her tenderly. Gurn, who spies the moment from the shadows, scampers off to tell Effie what has happened.

When the distressed Effie and her friends enter after hearing Gurn's report, the sylph disappears. The guests assume Gurn is simply jealous and laugh at him. Everyone dances. The sylph enters during the midst of the revelry and attempts to distract James.

As the bridal procession forms, James stands apart and gazes upon the ring he is to place on Effie's finger. The Sylph snatches the ring, places it on her own finger, and, smiling enticingly, rushes into the forest. James hurries after her in ardent pursuit. The guests are bewildered with James' sudden departure. Effie is heartbroken. She falls into her mother's arms sobbing inconsolably.

=== Act 2 ===
In a fog-shrouded part of the forest, Madge and her companion witches dance grotesquely about a cauldron. The revellers add all sorts of filthy ingredients to the brew. When the contents glow, Madge reaches into the cauldron and pulls a diaphanous, magic scarf from its depths. The cauldron then sinks, the witches scatter, the fog lifts, and a lovely glade is revealed.

James enters with the sylph, who shows him her charming woodland realm. She brings him berries and water for refreshment but avoids his embrace. To cheer him, she summons her ethereal sisters who shyly enter and perform their airy dances. The young Scotsman is delighted and joins the divertissement before all flee for another part of the forest.

Meanwhile, the wedding guests have been searching the woodland for James. They enter the glade. Gurn finds his hat, but Madge convinces him to say nothing. Effie enters, weary with wandering about the forest. Madge urges Gurn to propose. He does and Effie accepts his proposal.

When they all have left, James enters the glade. Madge meets him, and tosses him the magic scarf. She tells the young farmer the scarf will bind the sylph to him so she cannot fly away. She instructs him to wind the scarf about the sylph's shoulders and arms for full effect. James is ecstatic. When the sylph returns and sees the scarf, she allows James to place it around her trembling form.

As James embraces the sylph passionately, her wings fall off, she shudders, and dies in James' arms. Sorrowfully, her sisters enter and lift her lifeless form. Suddenly, a joyful wedding procession led by Effie and Gurn crosses the glade. James is stunned. James directs his gaze heavenward; he sees the sylph borne aloft by her sisters. James collapses. Madge exults over his lifeless body. She has triumphed.

== Characters ==
- James Ruben, a Scottish farmer
- The Sylph, a forest spirit
- Gurn, James' friend
- Effie, James' fiancée
- Old Madge, a village sorceress
- Effie's mother, an elderly woman
- Bridesmaids, wedding guests, witches

== Other versions ==
John Barnett's 1834 opera The Mountain Sylph is based on the storyline of La Sylphide; this opera's plot was in turn satirized by W. S. Gilbert in the 1882 Savoy opera, Iolanthe.

La Sylphide is often confused with the 1909 ballet Les Sylphides, another ballet involving a mythical sylph. The latter was choreographed by Michel Fokine for the Ballets Russes, using music by Frédéric Chopin, as a short performance. Though inspired by La Sylphide, it was meant to be performed as an independent ballet with its own merits.

Matthew Bourne created an updated version of La Sylphide in his 1994 production, Highland Fling. This is set in contemporary Scotland (of the 1990s) and uses the original score by Herman Severin Løvenskiold.

Johan Kobborg's version of Bournonville's ballet with some interpolations of new choreography (a duet for James and Effy, a pas de six before the reel, and a duet for James and the sylph) premiered in October 2005 at the Royal Opera House.

== See also ==
- List of ballets by August Bournonville
- Emma Livry
