= Le papillon (ballet) =

1860 ballet

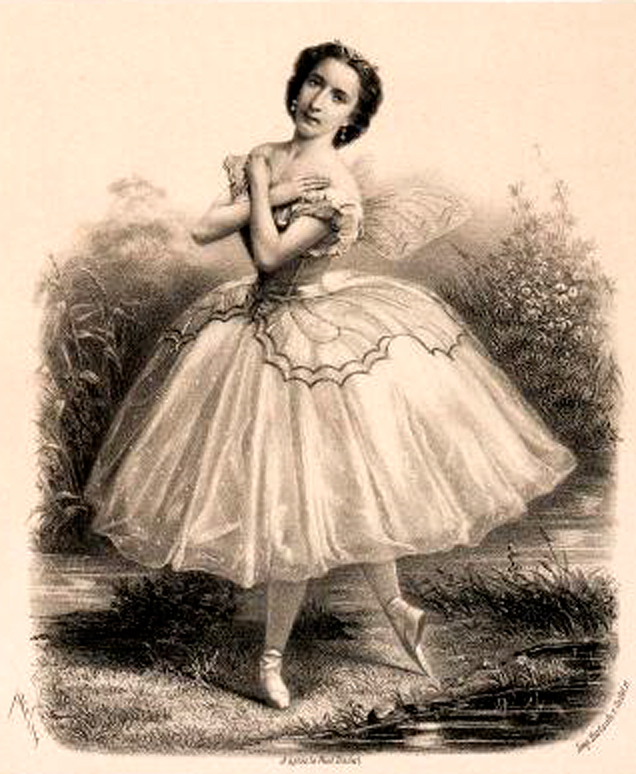
Emma Livry as Farfalla in the ballet Le papillon, Paris, 1861

Le papillon (The Butterfly) is a 'fantastic ballet' in two acts (four scenes) of 1860, with choreography by Marie Taglioni and music by Jacques Offenbach to a libretto by Jules-Henri Vernoy de Saint-Georges. It is the only stand-alone ballet score by Offenbach.

== Performance history ==
Le papillon was first presented by the Paris Opera Ballet at the Salle Le Peletier on November 26, 1860 after a performance of Lucie de Lammermoor. The principal dancers were Emma Livry (Farfalla/the Butterfly), Louis Mérante (Prince Djalma), Louise Marquet (Fairy Hamza), and Mme. Simon (Diamond Fairy). The premiere and second performance were attended by Napoléon III.

The Valse facile des rayons from the second scene of Act 1 was re-used by Offenbach in the third act ballet for Die Rheinnixen (1864) and parts of the score were inserted in the French version of Whittington, Le Chat du diable (1893). The solo for Le docteur Miracle "Eh! oui, je vous entends !" in the Antonia act of Les Contes d'Hoffmann originated as a Bohémiana in Le papillon. The Valse des rayons also became an Apache Dance at the Moulin Rouge in Paris, and was used in the musical Showboat in 1927 as part of the Trocadero scene.

The choreographer Marius Petipa created his own version of Le Papillon with a new score by Ludwig Minkus for the Imperial Ballet of St. Petersburg, Russia. This version was presented for the benefit performance of the Prima ballerina Ekaterina Vazem on 18 January [O.S. 6 January] 1874. Petipa originally intended to use Offenbach's original score for Le Papillon, but the director of the St. Petersburg Imperial Theatres Baron Karl Karlovich Kister refused to pay the fee for the rights to the score as demanded by the Paris Opéra and Offenbach himself. The cast also included Lev Ivanov as Prince Djalma and Alexander Bogdanov as the Fairy Hamza.

Having begun work on new version of the original ballet with the second act pas de deux for Paris in 1977 (partnered by Dominique Khalfouni) based on contemporary critical accounts, the full ballet was revived by Pierre Lacotte at the Rome Opera in 1982.

The score was used for a ballet entitled Utopia directed by Elsa-Marianne von Rosen for the Gothenburg Opera Dance Company in 1974. Having decided against making his own version of the full ballet, Frederick Ashton selected pieces from the score for a pas de deux entitled Scène dansante, first performed by Merle Park and David Wall in Aldeburgh in 1975 and then at a charity gala at the Adelphi Theatre London in 1977.

Ronald Hynd prepared a production for Houston Ballet with his own adapted scenario and the score re-orchestrated by John Lanchbery, which premiered on 8 February 1979 and was also danced by the Johannesburg company PACT. It entered the repertoire of the Sadler's Wells Royal Ballet in Leeds on 7 February 1980. Described as Hynd's tribute to Emma Livry, the plot was pared down and reset in Persia with many of the transformations and comic situations retained. But, compared to the original 1860 material, the score is largely altered by Lanchbery who integrates his own composition inside the main musical corpus, while changing the numbers order of the original Offenbach score.

== Synopsis ==
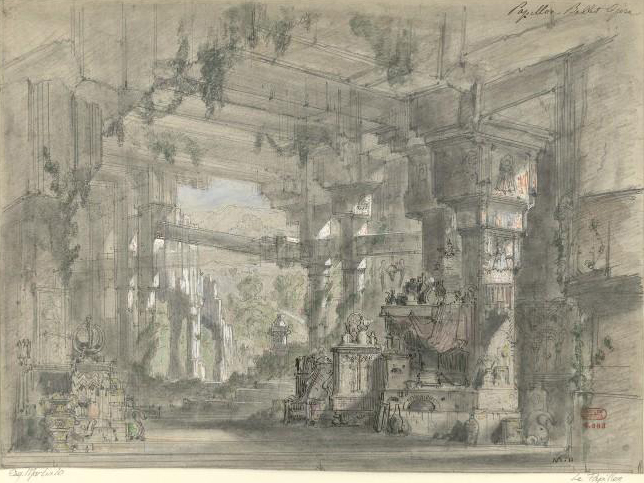
Design by Hugues Martin for Act 1 tableau 1 of Le papillon

The ballet is set in Circassia. After the Prelude, the first tableau of Act 1 opens with the evil old fairy Hamza treating her servant roughly. Hamza once abducted the Emir's daughter Farfalla who now serves as her maid. Looking in the mirror Hamza wishes only to become young again and eligible to marry, but to do this she must be kissed by a young prince.

Resting from a hunt Prince Djalma and his entourage enter. Everyone enjoys the food and wine, although the tutor thinks Farfalla that is the once kidnapped princess. The prince dances a mazurka with the maid and thanks her with a kiss. The tipsy Hamza is teased by the others and flies into a rage, lures Farfalla into a box and, using her magic crutch, when the box opens again, a beautiful butterfly emerges. Butterflies flutter into the room from doors, windows and even the chimney before being chased out by Hamza.

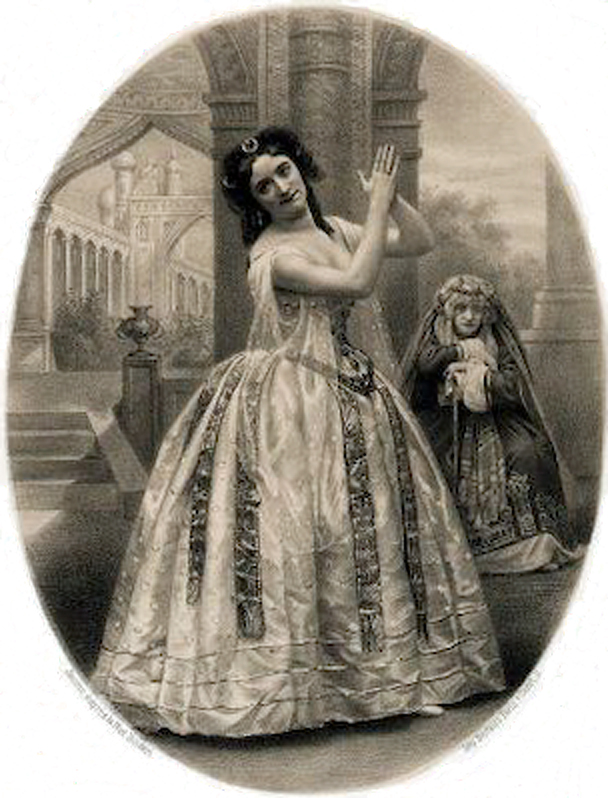
Marquet as the Fairy Hamza

After the Prince and his entourage have left Hamza's castle they reach a forest clearing, where shortly the butterflies fly in. When one of the butterflies is pinned to a tree by the prince, it suddenly turns into a crying girl. It falls to the ground unconscious and on inspection appears to be the prince's dance partner of earlier. But it recovers and re-joins the others.

Hamza now arrives in the clearing with her gardener. With her magic crutch she locates her maid among the butterflies and tries to catch her in a net. But leaving her magic wand unattended for a moment her gardener Patimate tries to help Farfalla. He touches his mistress with the wand and she is frozen on the spot, upon which the butterflies hasten to capture Hamza in the net. Meanwhile Patimate tells Djalma about Farfalla's real identity. However, he forgets to take the magic wand and a leprechaun steals in grabs it and rushes away. The prince carries the fairy off to his uncle's palace.

Act 2 opens at the palace of the emir Ismaël, where the happy Djalma and Farfalla arrive in a golden carriage. It emerges that Farfalla is in fact his daughter and can marry his nephew Djalma. However, when the prince tries to embrace his love Farfalla reminds him how not long before he wanted to impale a butterfly to a tree. Djalma tries again to kiss her, but Hamza, lurking nearby throws herself between them and obtains the kiss meant for Farfalla. The spell works for Hamza and she is turned into a beautiful young girl. Prince Djalma is confused to see the two beautiful women. He courts the rejuvenated fairy, hoping to make Farfalla throws herself into his arms, but Hamza flies into a rage and sends the prince into a magnetic sleep, while Farfalla is changed back into a butterfly. The palace of the Emir is transformed into a park.

The last tableau, in grandiose gardens, has Djalma awakening, and he finds himself surrounded by a swarm of butterflies, including his beloved Farfalla. Hamza enters with her four sisters boasting of her exploits, and secretly dreaming of marrying the prince. As a rehearsal for such an event she summons a band of golden harps, and a torch carrier. Farfalla is attracted by the glow of the torch, but in touching the lamp she burns her wings and the charm fades: she regains her human form and collapses into the arms of the prince. Hamza's sisters then break the magic crutch and together transform Hamza into a statue. The wedding with Djalma now has no more obstacles and the young couple can marry in the fairy palace which appears in the gardens.

== Recordings ==
- Offenbach: Le papillon (highlights); London Symphony Orchestra conducted by Richard Bonynge, Decca SXL 6588, recorded at the Kingsway Hall in January 1972.
- Offenbach: Le papillon (three extracts - music arranged and re-orchestrated by John Lanchbery); WDR Sinfonieorchester Köln conducted by Pinchas Steinberg, Capriccio, recorded 1986, released 2010.
- Offenbach - Hommage mécanique - Malibran CDRG 214; includes a 30-minute suite for barrel organ based on Le Papillon in addition to rare music from operas (La Diva, La Marocaine)
