= Carstens =

Carstens is a surname. Notable people with the surname include:

- Agustín Carstens (b. 1958), Mexican economist
- Arno Carstens, South African singer-songwriter
- Asmus Jacob Carstens (1754–1798), Danish-German painter
- Camilla Carstens (b. 1977), Norwegian team handball player
- Carl Wilhelm Carstens (1887–1950), Norwegian geologist
- David Carstens (1914–1955), South African boxer
- Deon Carstens (b. 1979), South African rugby union footballer
- Harold H. Carstens (1925–2009), president of Carstens Publications
- Ingvild Ryggen Carstens (b. 1980), Norwegian ski mountaineer, heptathlete and pentathlete
- Jordan Carstens (b. 1981), American football defensive tackle
- Karl Carstens (1914–1992), German politician and president of the Federal Republic of Germany
- Lesley Carstens (b. 1965), South African sprint canoer
- Lina Carstens (1892–1978), German film- and theater actress
- Manfred Carstens (born 1943), German politician (CDU)
- Nico Carstens, South African accordionist and songwriter
- Peter Carstens (1903–1945), German geneticist and animal breeder and SS-Oberführer
- Theodore Carstens, American fencer
- Veronica Carstens (1923–2012), wife of the German President Karl Carstens
- Wilhelm Carstens (1869–19??), German rower

== See also ==
- Karsten
- Karstens
