= Carl Wilhelm Carstens =

Norwegian geologist

Carl Wilhelm Carstens (1887 – 1950) was a Norwegian geologist.

He was born in Trondhjem. He was a lecturer at the Norwegian Institute of Technology from 1920 to 1936. In 1936 he was hired by the private company Orkla Gruber, having a considerable influence on the mining industry of Norway.
