= Herman Severin Løvenskiold =

Norwegian composer

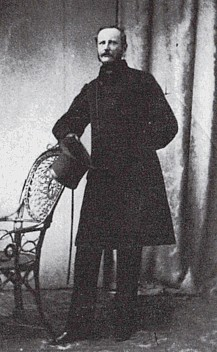
Baron Herman Severin Løvenskiold. Copenhagen, Denmark. circa 1860

Baron Herman Severin Løvenskiold (30 July 1815 – 5 December 1870) was a Norwegian-born Danish composer, most noted for his score for August Bournonville's 1836 version of the ballet La Sylphide for the Royal Danish Ballet in Copenhagen.

== Early life and education ==
Herman Severin Løvenskiold was born at Ulefoss in the Lunde prestegjeld in Bratsberg county. He was the son of Eggert Christopher Løvenskiold (1788–1861), director of the Ulefos Iron Works. In 1829, his family moved to Denmark. He was trained in music by composer Peter Casper Krossing. He also went abroad where he studied in Vienna, Leipzig and St. Petersburg.

== Career ==
Following his return to Denmark, he composed music for a number of dramatic works at the Royal Danish Theatre. From 1851, he was the organist at Christiansborg Castle Church (Christiansborg Slotskirke) on Slotsholmen in Copenhagen. This church, which dated from 1738 to 1742, was frequently attended by members of the Danish royal family.

== Personal life ==
He married to Anne Elisabeth Fabritius, also called Rine (1820-1864), daughter of goldsmith Jørgen Ludvig Fabritius (1786-1824) and Sophie Dorothea Elisabeth Jensen (1785-1864). The couple had no children.

== Notable works ==
- La Sylphide, ballet, 1836
- Hulen i Kullafjeld, Singspiel, 1839
- The New Penelope, ballet, 1847
- Turandot, opera, 1854
- Fra skoven ved Furesø, Concert Overture, 1863 (Op. 29)
- Piano Quartet in F minor, Op. 26
- "Ouverture til drammaet Konning Volmer og Havfruen", Op. 20 (published 1848 by Hornemann & Erslev)

== Related Reading ==
- Frydendal, Flemming (ed) (1998) Christiansborg Slot (Copenhagen: Slots- og Ejendomsstyrelsen) ISBN 87-9866143-4
- Hvidt, Kristian (1975)' Christiansborg Slot. Udgivet af Folketingets Præsidium (Copenhagen: Nyt Nordisk Forlag ) ISBN 87-1701955-9.
