= Christoffer Christian Karsten =

Swedish opera singer (1756–1827)

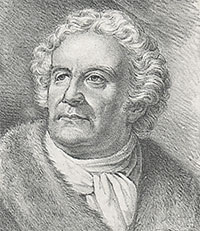

Background information
- Born: 9 September 1756; Ystad, Sweden
- Died: 6 August 1827 (aged 70)
- Genres: Opera
- Instrument: voice

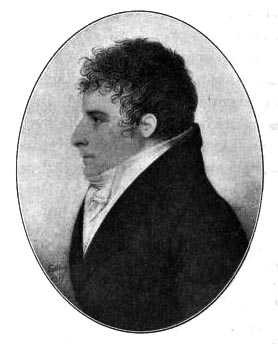
088-Kristofer Karsten-Svenska teatern 4

Christoffer Christian Karsten (Note: also spelled Kristofer Kristian) (9 September 1756 – 6 August 1827) was a Swedish opera singer. He was the maternal grandfather of the ballerina Marie Taglioni.

== Life ==
Born in Ystad, he was discovered by queen Louisa Ulrika of Prussia in 1771, when he sang for her on her way to her visit to Berlin, and so impressed her that she gave him the opportunity to study singing in Stockholm.

=== Career ===
In 1773, he debuted at the Royal Swedish Opera in Bollhuset with Carl Stenborg and Elisabeth Olin in the famous opera performance Thetis och Phelée. He was employed at the opera's choir until he performed his first leading role as Adonis in the opera ballet Adonis. He was a student of Potenza in Copenhagen, and when he returned in 1778, he became the perhaps most successful male singer in Sweden together with Carl Stenborg until 1806, admired for the beauty of both his voice and his body. In 1781, at his marriage, he was given the villa Canton at Drottningholm, were his family lived until 1870. He was elected into the Royal Swedish Academy of Music and made Hovsångare in 1787 and was given the title royal secretary in 1791.

At his debut 1776 he was given the critic:

"At last, the director at the Opera have required a rival to Mr Carl Stenborg in young Karsten, who sang and played very well in Adonis. Even without the clothes and the make up he has a pleasant physiognomy, beautiful figure, tall and slim", and was judged as: "An enormous victory for (director) Zibet but a créve-coeur for Mrs Olin, who being forced to act opposite a boy from the choir".

Karsten and Stenborg was the male stars of the Gustavian age in Sweden, and complemented each other well, as they had different ways of acting: "When Karsten with his strong, sonorous, all-dominating voice shooked the entire nervous system of the listeners, delighted them and commanded admiration, the soft, sensitive, melodious tones of Stenborg penetrated the heart and filled the eyes with sympathetic tears".

He also toured abroad. He sang in Copenhagen in 1783, Berlin in 1788, 1792 in London and 1810–1811 in Paris.

When the Royal Swedish opera was (temporarily) closed in 1806, he was forced to retire with the rest of the staff. After it opened again in 1809, he made guest appearances until 1825.

=== Roles ===
Among the plays he performed in was Arséne by Monsigny opposite Marie Louise Marcadet and Elisabeth Olin during the 1779–80 season, Alceste by Gluck with Caroline Frederikke Müller and Carl Stenborg (season 1780–1781); Roland by Quinault with Carl Stenborg and Müller (1781–1782); Atys by Piccinni opposite Carl Stenborg and Marcadet (1784–1785), Iphigenie på Tauris by Glück with Carl Stenborg and Müller and Gustaf Wasa by Naumann with Marcadet, Carl Stenborg and Müller (1785–1786), Armide by Quinault with Carl Stenborg and Müller (1786–1787); Gustaf Adolf och Ebba Brahe by Gustav III with Müller, Franziska Stading and Carl Stenborg (1787–1788); Azemia by Dalayrac with Müller and Abraham de Broen (1792–1793); Folke Birgersson till Ringstad with Marcadet and Inga Åberg (1792–1793), De bägge Savojarderna (Two Savoyards) by Dalayrac with Müller and Marcadet (1793–1794); Reanud d'Ast by Dalayrac with Müller (1795–1796); Aeneas in Carthago by Kraus with Carl Stenborg (1799–1800) and Oidipus i Athen by Sacchini 1800–01 opposite Stading. In 1796, he played opposite, Caroline Müller, Louis Deland, Carl Stenborg and Inga Åberg in the play Karavanen (The Caravane) by Gretry, which was held to celebrate that the young king had been declared of legal majority.

=== Private life ===
Karsten married the Polish actor and opera singer Sophie Stebnowska (1753–1848), also considered as one of the better talents at the opera until 1806. His daughter, Sophie Karsten, was premier dancer at the Opera in 1805–1806, married Filippo Taglioni and became the mother of Marie Taglioni. His younger daughter, Elisabeth Charlotta Karsten, was a painter.

== Bibliography ==
- Marie Taglioni, Souvenirs. Le manuscrit inédit de la grande danseuse romantique, édition établie, présentée et annotée par Bruno Ligore, Gremese, 2017.
- Madison U. Sowell, Debra H. Sowell, Francesca Falcone, Patrizia Veroli, Icônes du ballet romantique. Marie Taglioni et sa famille, Gremese, 2016.
