= Elisabeth Charlotta Karsten =

Swedish artist (1789–1856)

Elisabeth Charlotta Karsten, married surname Kachanoff (1789–1856), was a Swedish painter.

She was born in Stockholm, the daughter of Kristofer Kristian Karsten and Sophie Stebnowska and sister of Sophie Karsten. She was the student of Carl Johan Fahlcrantz. Karsten was a landscape painter and copied in oil from the work, among others, Ruysdael and Vernet. She used oil and gouache. she was represented on the exhibitions of the Royal Swedish Academy of Arts in Stockholm between 1804 and 1810.

She married the Russian general Simeon Kachanoff in 1818, and moved with him to Dagestan.
