= Sophie Karsten =

Swedish ballerina and painter

Hedvig Sophie Karsten (3 September 1783 – 25 February 1862) was a Swedish ballerina and artist (painter).

Born to opera singers Christoffer Christian Karsten and Sophie Stebnowska, she was the sister of painter Elisabeth Charlotta Karsten.

Sophie Karsten became a dancer at the Royal Swedish Ballet in the Royal Swedish Opera in Stockholm. In 1805, she was appointed premier dancer. She was also active as a painter, and participated in the exhibitions of the Royal Swedish Academy of Arts in Stockholm between 1802 and 1804. Her most noted painting was a mountain landscape.

She married Filippo Taglioni in 1803, and became the mother of the ballerina Marie Taglioni.

== Sources ==
- Dahlberg och Hagström, Svenskt konstlexikon. Allhems Förlag (1953) Malmö. (in Swedish)
- Osmo Durchman, Finska anor inom furstehus (in Swedish)
