= Salle Le Peletier =

Theatre of the Paris Opera from 1821 to 1873

Coordinates: 48°52′23″N 02°20′20″E

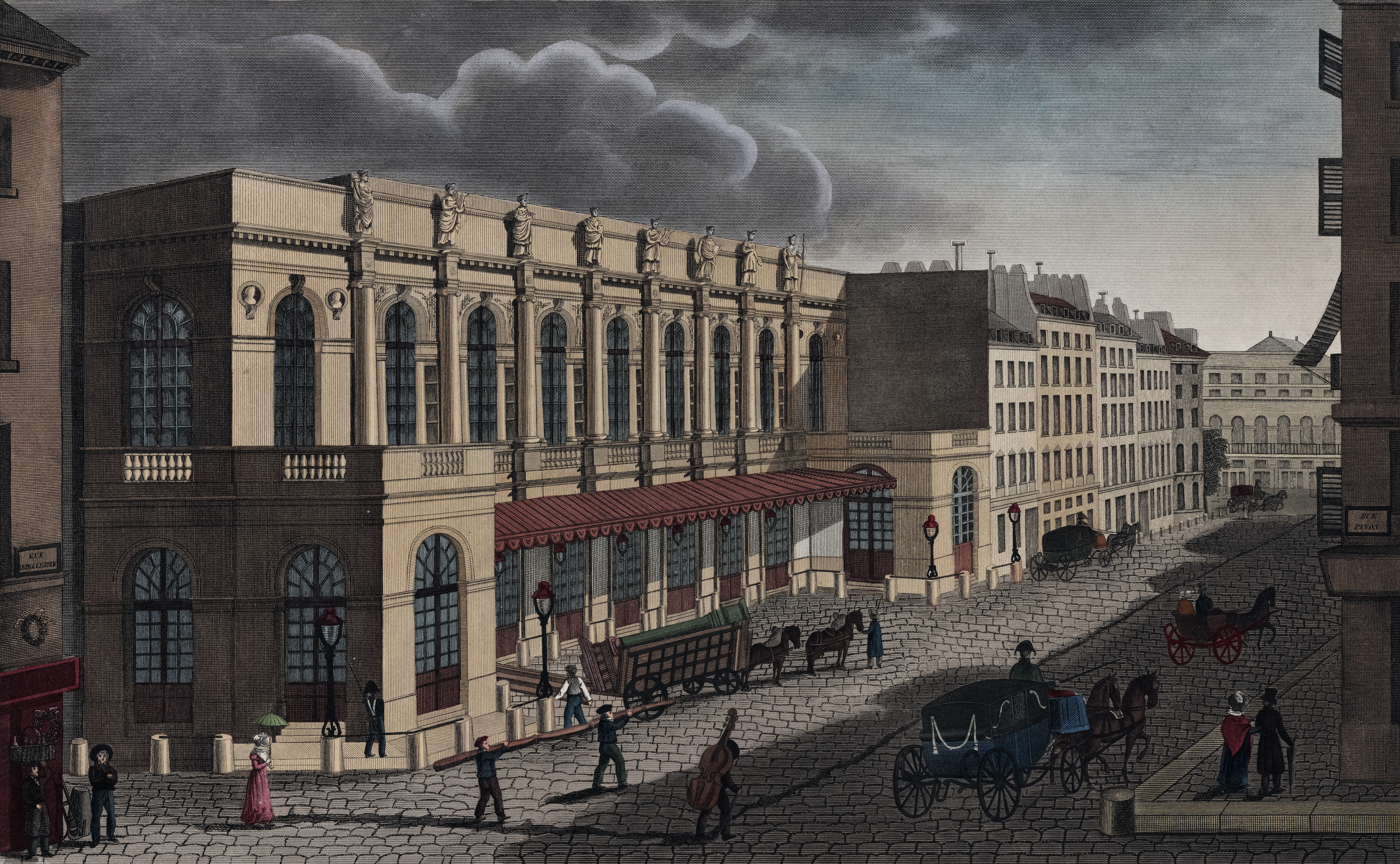
The Théâtre de l'Académie Royale de Musique, the official title of the Paris Opera c. 1821

The Salle Le Peletier or Lepeletier (sometimes referred to as the Salle de la rue Le Peletier or the Opéra Le Peletier) was the home of the Paris Opera from 1821 until the building was destroyed by fire in 1873. The theatre was designed and constructed by the architect François Debret on the site of the garden of the Hôtel de Choiseul on the rue Lepeletier. Due to the many changes in government and management during the theatre's existence, it had a number of different official names, the most important of which were: Théâtre de l'Académie Royale de Musique (1821–1848), Opéra-Théâtre de la Nation (1848–1850), Théâtre de l'Académie Nationale de Musique (1850–1852), Théâtre de l'Académie Impériale de Musique (1852–1854), Théâtre Impérial de l'Opéra (1854–1870), and Théâtre National de l'Opéra (1870–1873).

== History ==
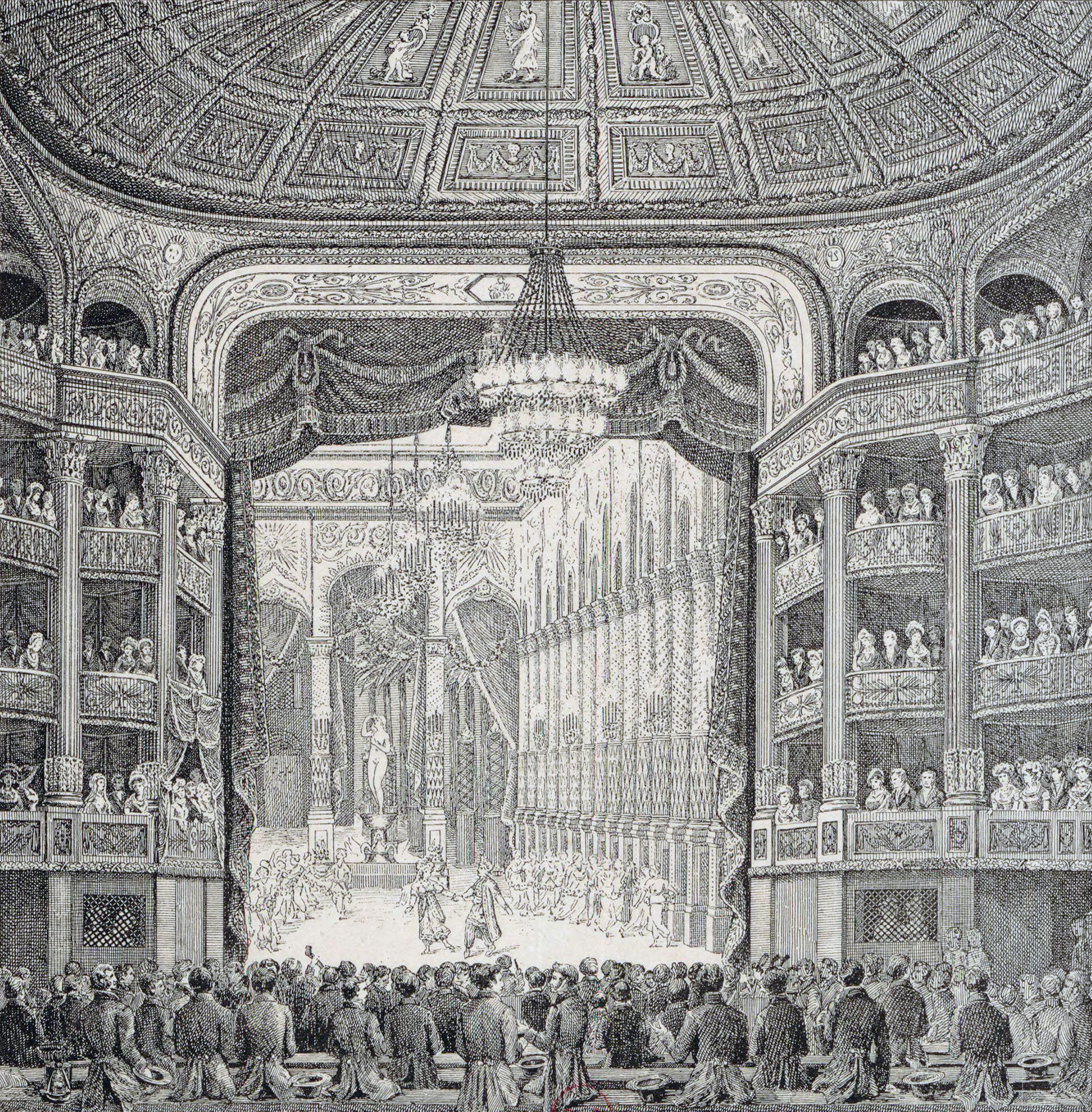
Performance of Charles-Simon Catel's opera Les bayadères for the inauguration of the Paris Opera's Salle Le Peletier on 16 August 1821

When Louis XVIII's nephew, Charles Ferdinand, duc de Berry, was fatally stabbed on the night of 13 February 1820 in front of the former theatre of the Paris Opera, the Salle de la rue de Richelieu, the king decided that the theatre would be demolished in order to build a commemorative chapel in its place. However, the project to build a chapel was never carried out due to the 1830 revolution. Today the Fontaine Louvois in the Square Louvois occupies the spot where the chapel would have been built. The Salle de la rue de Richelieu had been the principal venue of the Paris Opera since 1794. Very soon after the death of his nephew in February 1820, the king commissioned the architect François Debret to design a new theatre for the Opéra on the Rue Le Peletier, which was completed one year later. During the construction the opera and ballet companies occupied the Théâtre Favart and the Salle Louvois.

The Salle Le Peletier was inaugurated on 16 August 1821 with a mixed-bill that opened with the anthem "Vive Henry VIII", and included the composer Catel's opera Les bayadères and the Ballet Master Gardel's ballet Le Retour de Zéphire. Although the theatre was meant to be temporary and was built of wood and plaster, it continued to be used by the Opéra for more than fifty years. Many of the great grand operas of the 19th century were presented for the first time on its stage, among them: Rossini's Guillaume Tell (1829), Meyerbeer's Robert le Diable (1831), Halévy's La Juive (1835), and Verdi's Don Carlos (1867).

The theatre, which was 14,000 square metres in area with a 104 ft. stage, was quite advanced for its time. On 6 February 1822 gas was used for the first time in order to light the stage effects in Nicolas Isouard's opera Aladin ou La Lampe merveilleuse. The stage and orchestra pit were able to be removed in order to transform the auditorium into a massive hall which could accommodate large balls and other festivities.

=== Ballet ===
Along with the Ballet of Her Majesty's Theatre in London, the Salle Le Peletier played host to the heyday of the romantic ballet, with such Balletmasters as Jules Perrot, Arthur Saint-Léon, Filippo Taglioni, Joseph Mazilier, Jean Coralli, and Paul Taglioni staging many masterworks for the Paris Opera Ballet. Among these works: La Sylphide (1832), Giselle (1841), Paquita (1846), Le corsaire (1856), Le papillon (1860), La source (1866), and Coppélia (1870). Among the great ballerinas to grace the stage of the Opéra during this time were Marie Taglioni, Carlotta Grisi, Carolina Rosati, Fanny Elssler, Lucile Grahn, and Fanny Cerrito.

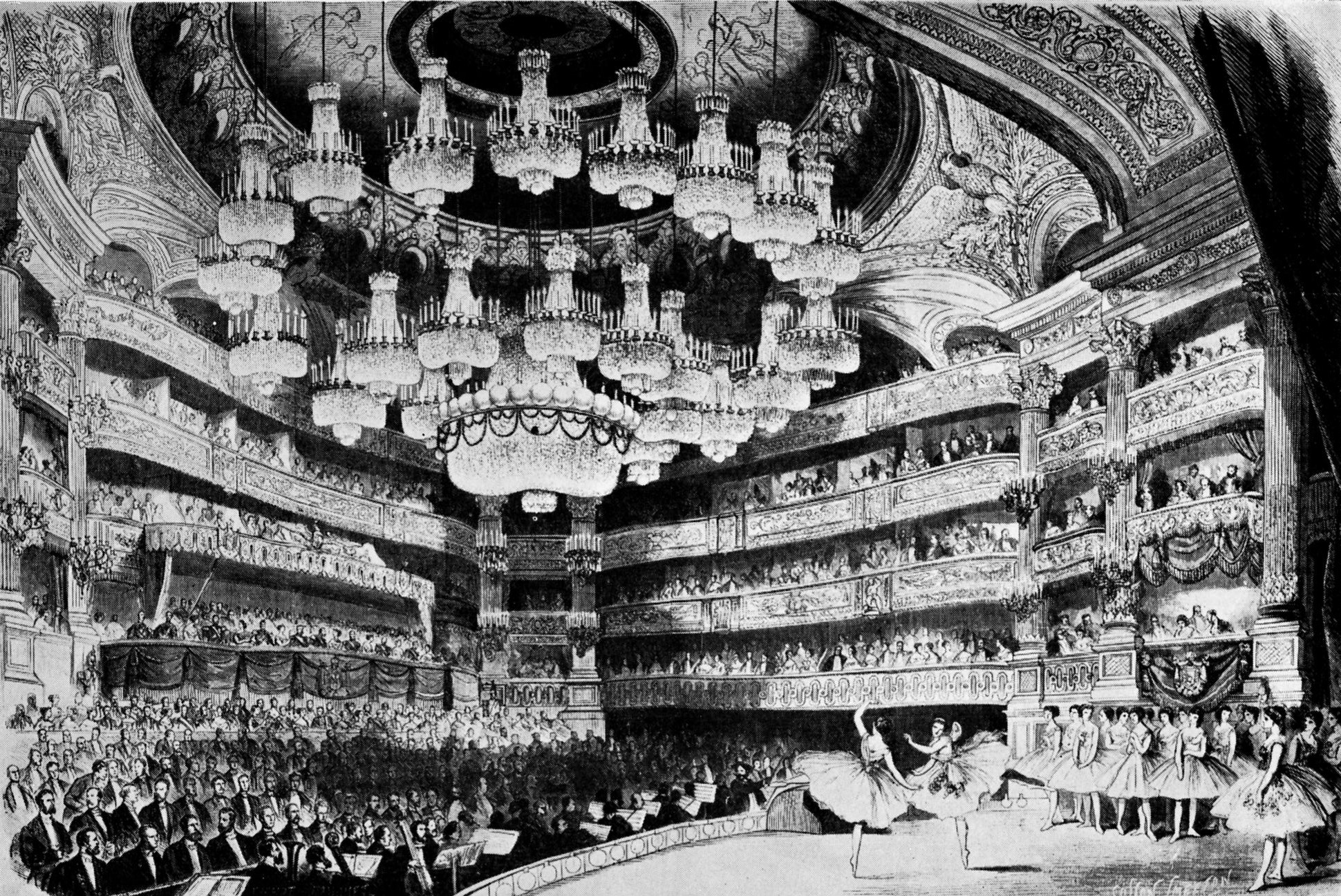
The ballet Giselle during a state visit of Tsar Alexander II (4 June 1867)

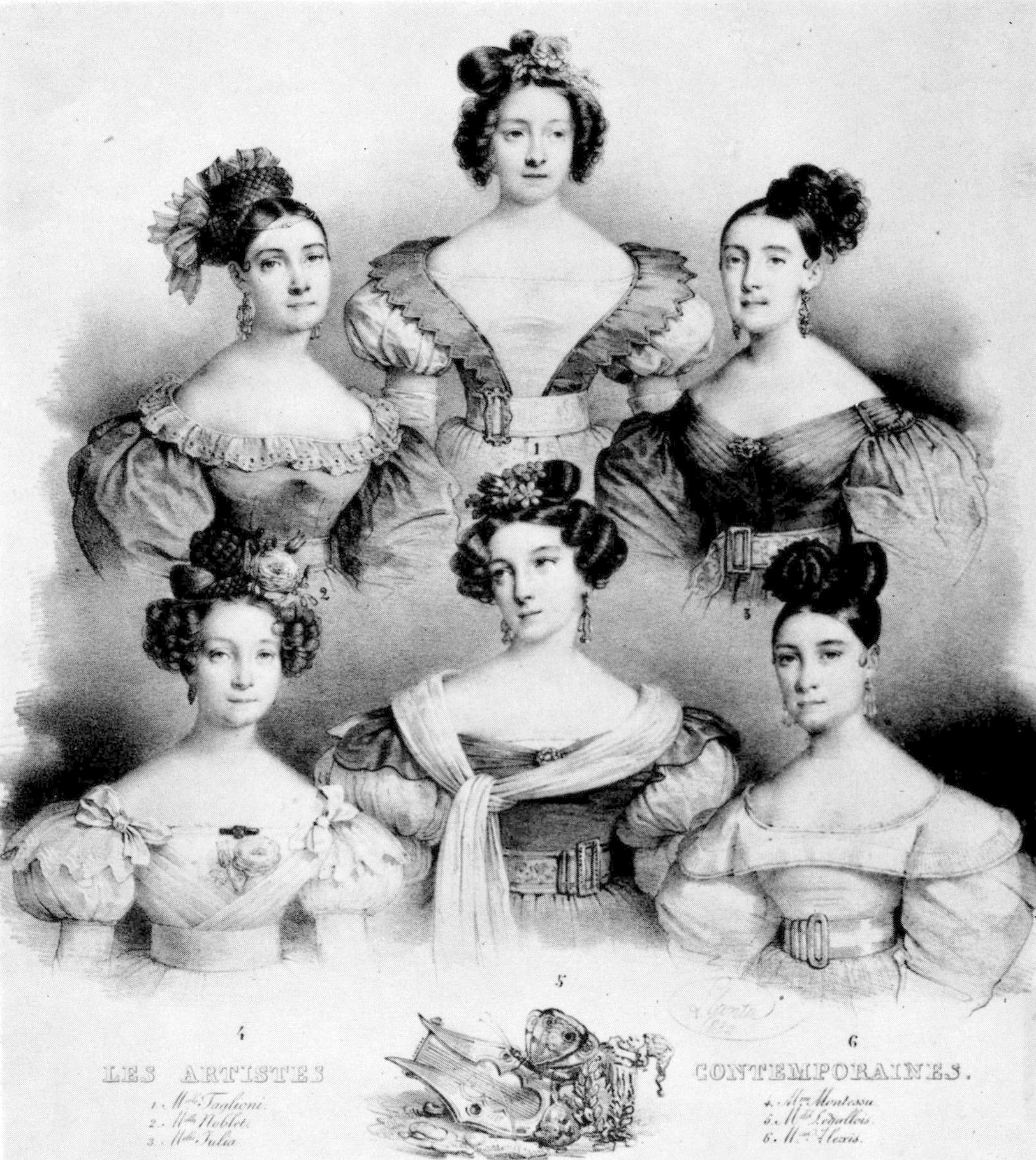
The Principal Ballerinas of the Paris Opera (clockwise from top left): Lise Noblet, Marie Taglioni, M^{lle} Julia [de Varennes], Alexis Dupont (née Félicité Noblet, she used the name of her husband Alexis Dupont), Amélie Legallois, and Pauline Montessu, premiers sujets in 1831.

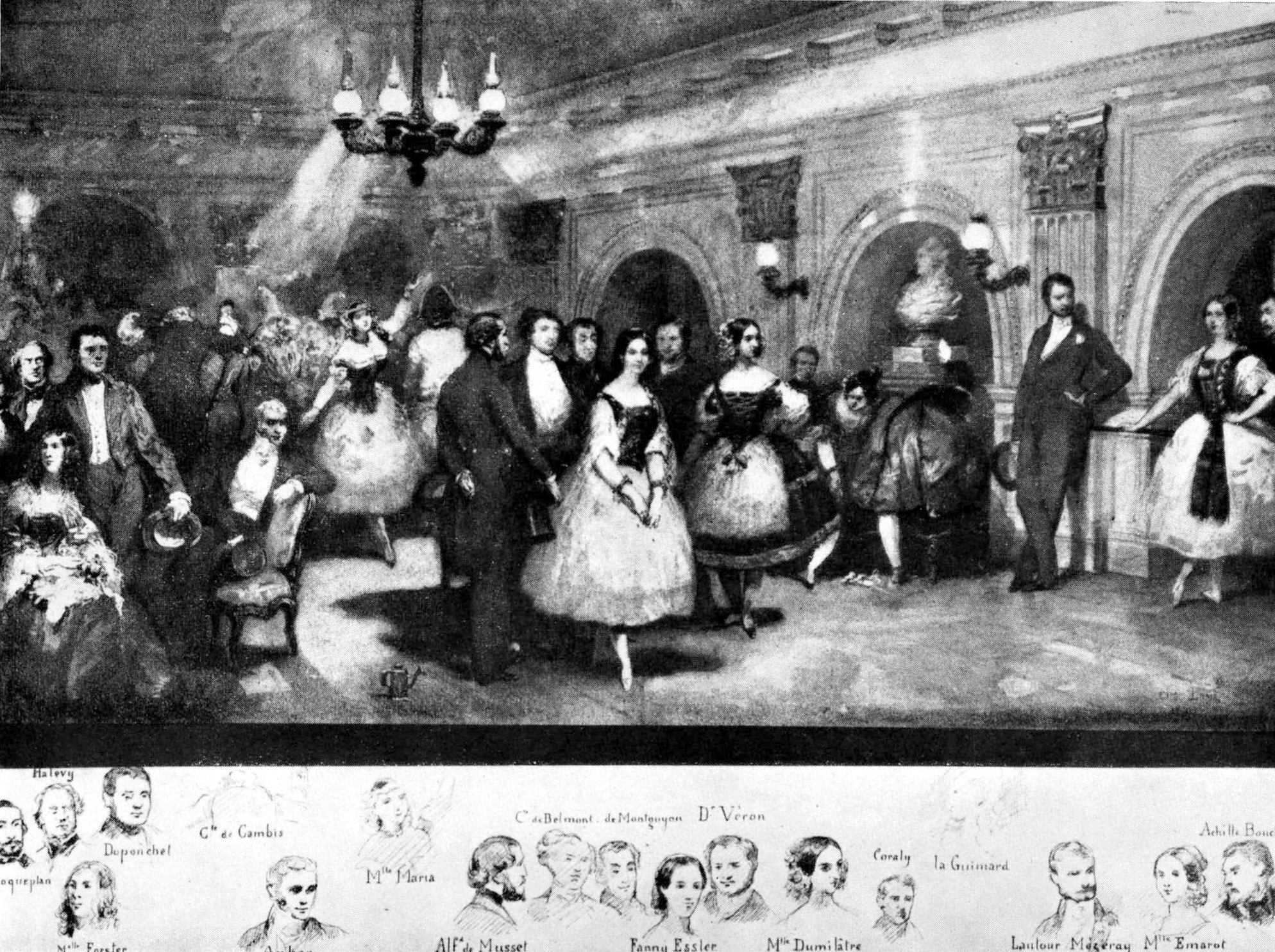
Lithograph depicting many famous dancers and their patrons in the Foyer de la Danse (1841)

=== Fire ===
On the night of 29 October 1873, the Salle Le Peletier met the same fate as many of its predecessors: it was destroyed by a fire which raged for 27 hours, believed to have been started by the theatre's innovative gas lighting. Fortunately, in 1858 Emperor Napoleon III had hired the civic planner Baron Haussmann to begin construction on a second theatre at a more prominent location for the Parisian Opera and Ballet based on the design of architect Charles Garnier. In 1875, the new theatre, today known as the Palais Garnier, was inaugurated.

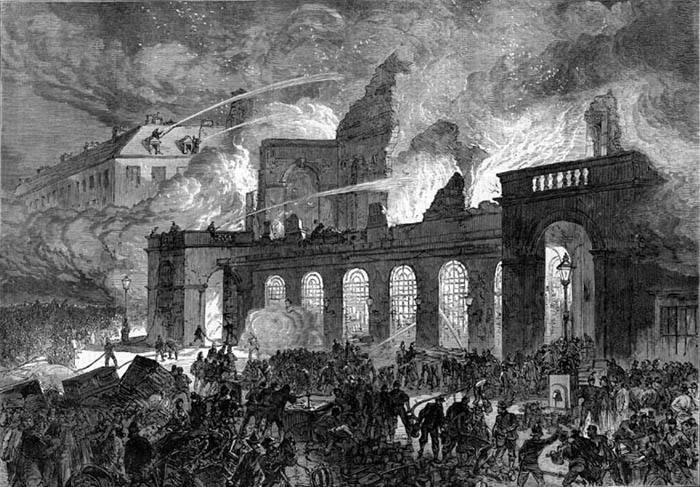
Fire of 29 October 1873

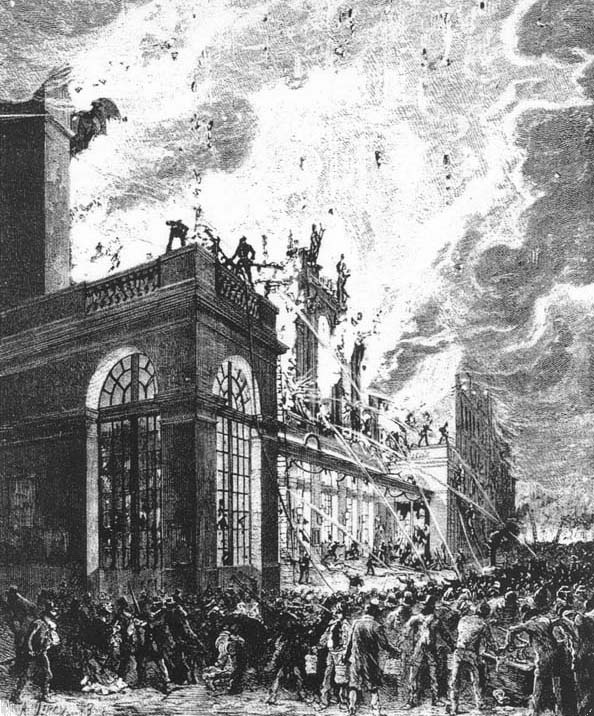
Perspective view of the fire

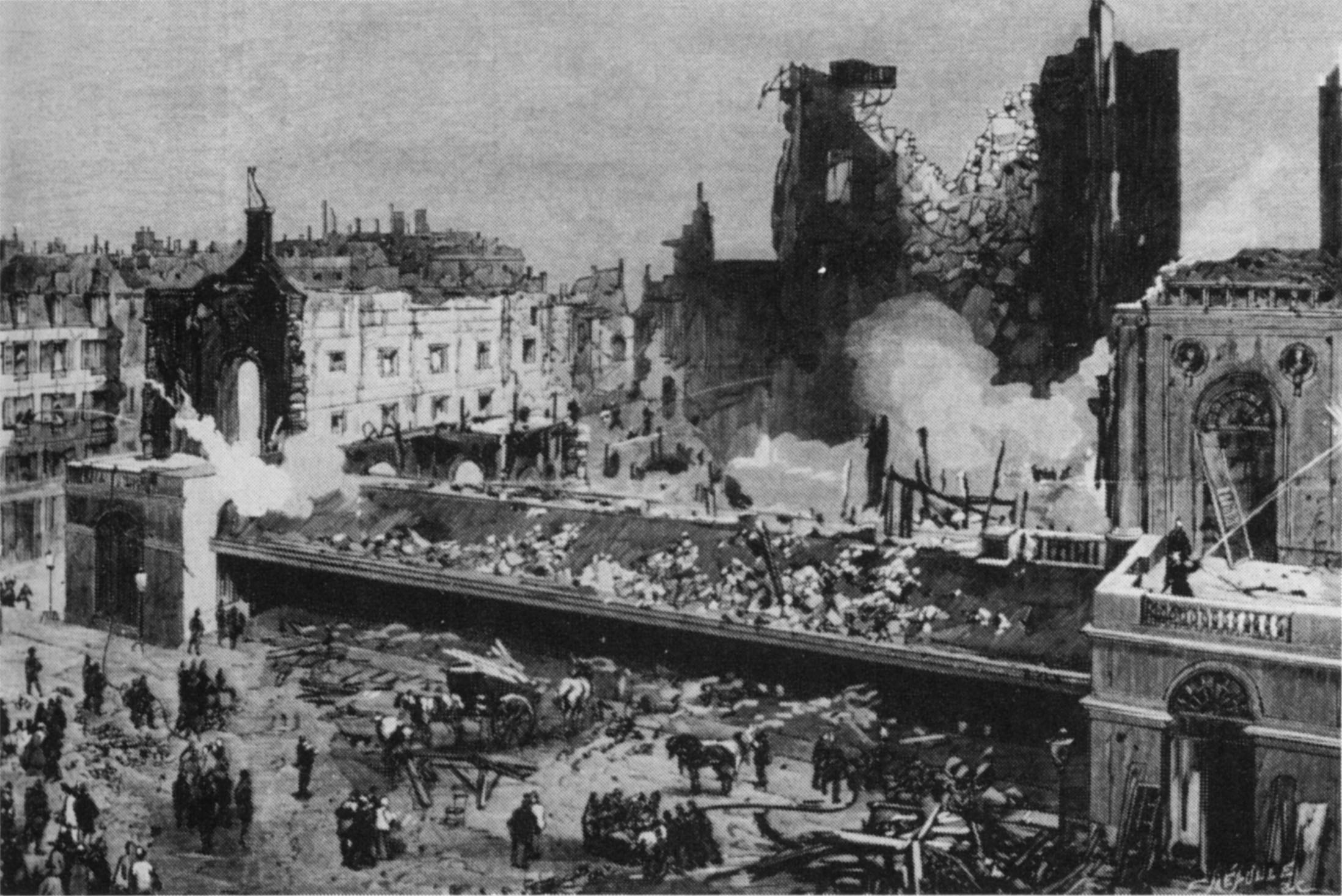
After the fire

== Gallery ==
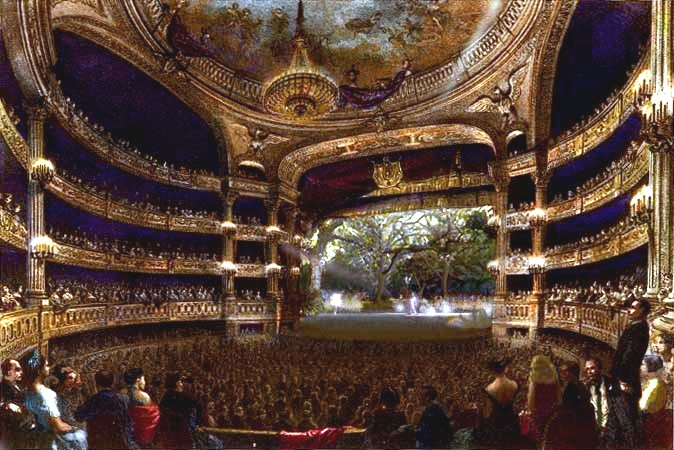
Painting of the Grande Salle of the theatre during a performance of a ballet (1864)

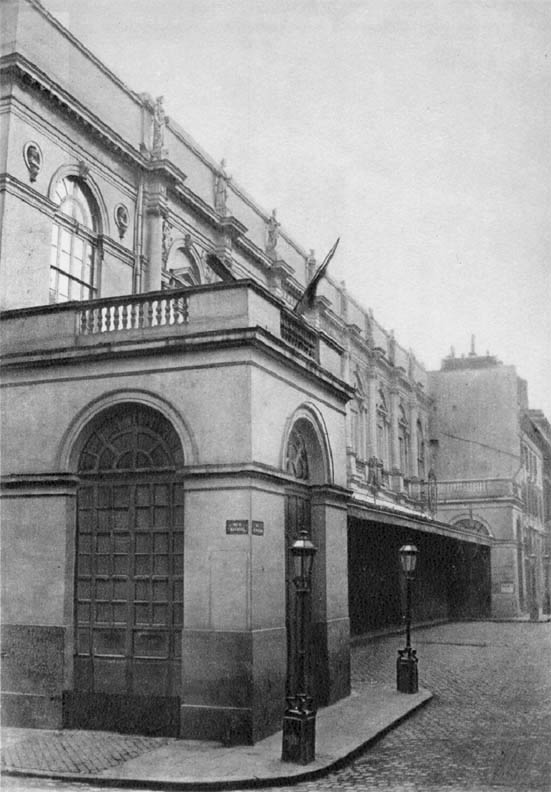
Perspective view of the façade on the Rue Le Peletier (c. 1870)

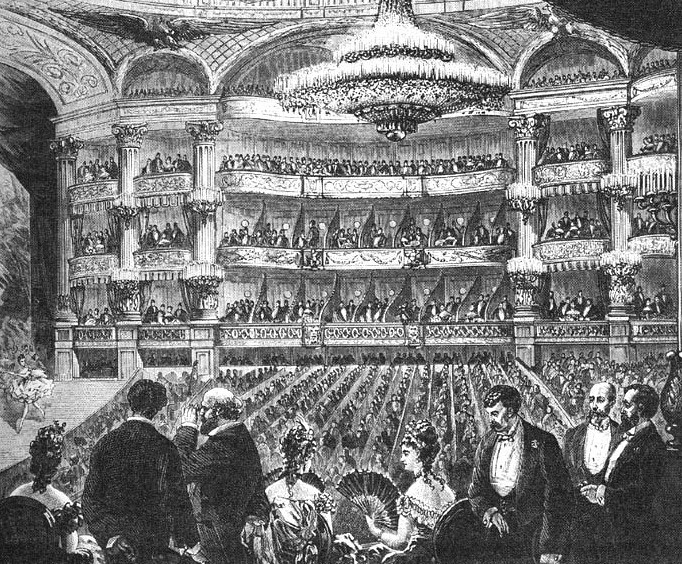
Lithograph of the Grande Salle (1854)

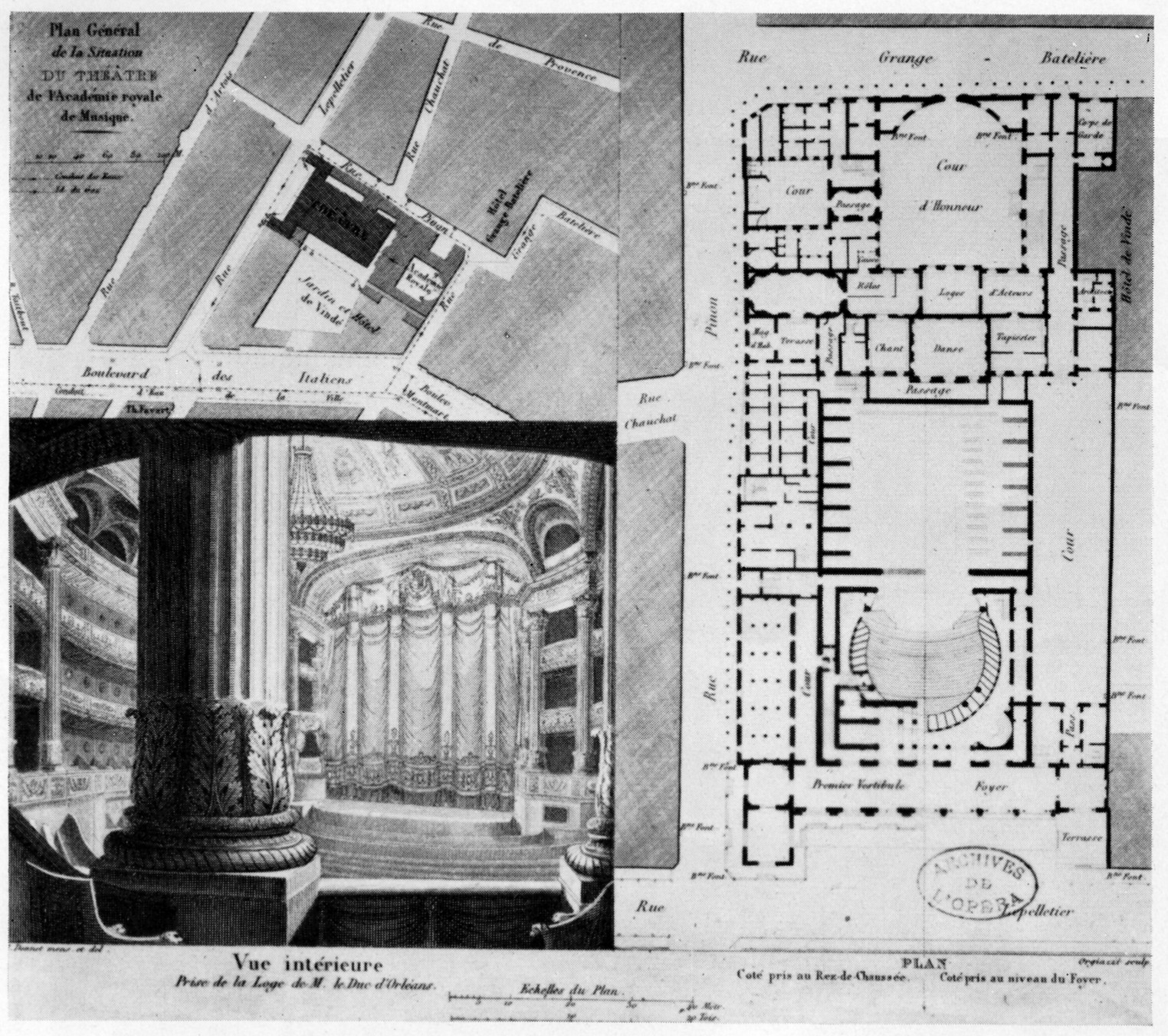
Site plan, floor plan, and interior perspective view (1822)

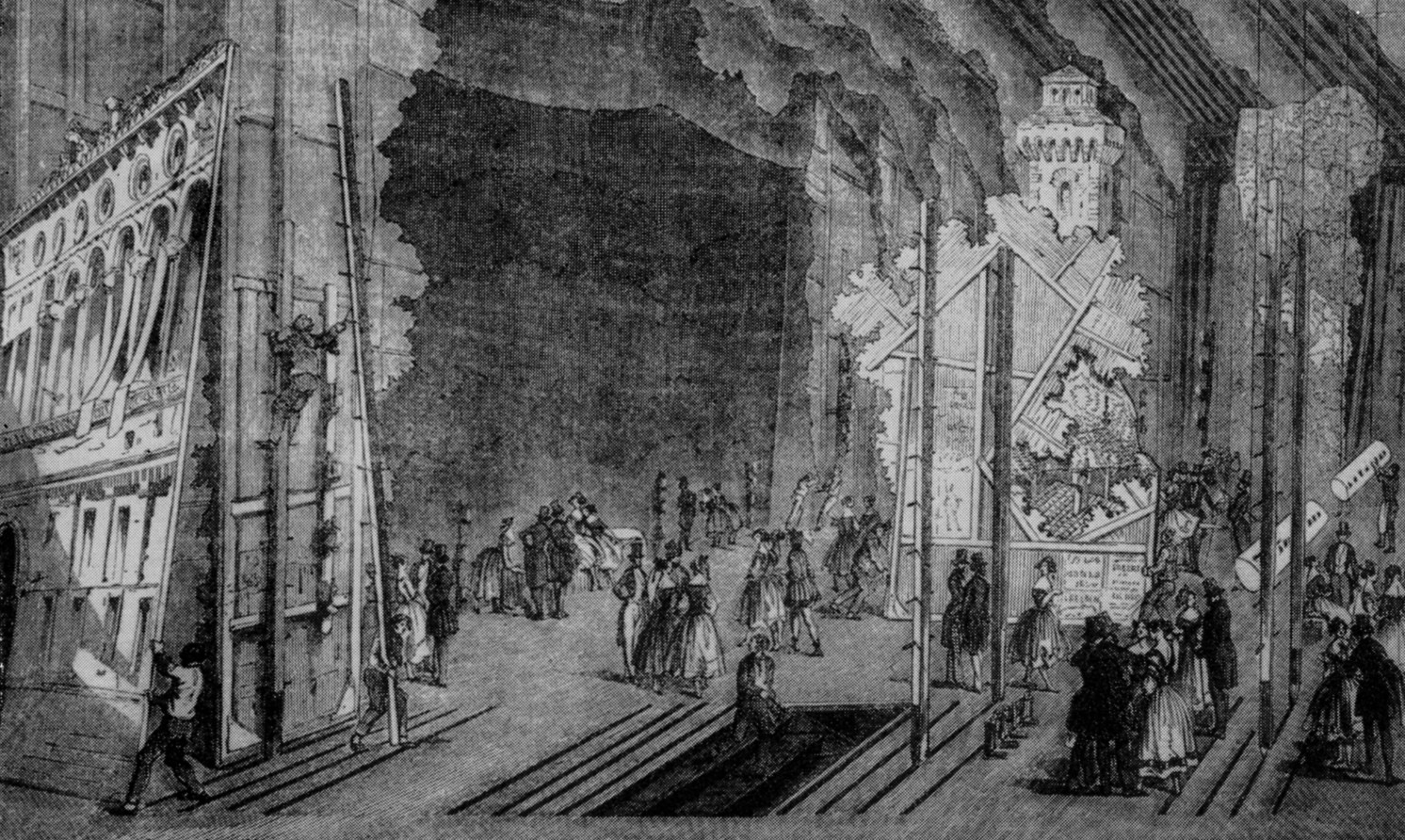
The backstage area (c. 1840)

== Notable premières ==
Operas

- Le siège de Corinthe (1826) – Gioacchino Rossini
- Moïse et Pharaon (1827) – Gioacchino Rossini
- La muette de Portici (1828) – Daniel Auber
- Le comte Ory (1828) – Gioacchino Rossini
- Guillaume Tell (1829) – Gioacchino Rossini
- Robert le diable (1831) – Giacomo Meyerbeer
- Gustave III (1833) – Daniel Auber
- La Juive (1835) – Fromental Halévy
- Les Huguenots (1836) – Giacomo Meyerbeer
- La Esmeralda (1836) – Louise Bertin
- Stradella (1837) – Louis Niedermeyer
- Guido et Ginevra (1838) – Fromental Halévy
- Benvenuto Cellini (1838) – Hector Berlioz
- Les martyrs (1840) – Gaetano Donizetti
- La favorite (1840) – Gaetano Donizetti
- La reine de Chypre (1841) – Fromental Halévy
- Charles VI (1843) – Fromental Halévy
- Dom Sebastien (1843) – Gaetano Donizetti
- Marie Stuart (1844) – Louis Niedermeyer
- Jérusalem (1847) – Giuseppe Verdi
- Le prophète (1849) – Giacomo Meyerbeer
- Sapho (1851) – Charles Gounod
- La nonne sanglante (1854) – Charles Gounod
- Les vêpres siciliennes (1855) – Giuseppe Verdi
- Le trouvère (1857) – Giuseppe Verdi
- Tannhäuser (Paris Version) (1861) – Richard Wagner
- La reine de Saba (1862) – Charles Gounod
- L'Africaine (1865) – Giacomo Meyerbeer
- Don Carlos (1867) – Giuseppe Verdi
- Hamlet (1868) – Ambroise Thomas
- Faust (Paris Opera Version) (1869) – Charles Gounod

Ballets

- La fille mal gardée (1828) – choreography by Jean-Pierre Aumer; music by Ferdinand Hérold
- La Sylphide (1832) – choreography by Filippo Taglioni; music by Jean Madeleine Schneitzhoeffer
- La fille du Danube (1836) – choreography by Filippo Taglioni; music by Adolphe Adam
- Le diable amoureux (1840) – choreography by Joseph Mazilier; music by Napoléon Henri Reber and François Benoist
- Giselle (1841) – choreography by Jean Coralli and Jules Perrot; music by Adolphe Adam (additional music by Friedrich Burgmüller)
- La Péri (1843) – choreography by Jean Coralli; music by Friedrich Burgmüller
- Le diable à quatre (1845) – choreography by Joseph Mazilier; music by Adolphe Adam
- Paquita (1846) – choreography by Joseph Mazilier; music by Edouard Deldevez
- Le corsaire (1856) – choreography by Joseph Mazilier; music by Adolphe Adam
- Le marché des innocents (1859) – choreography by Marius Petipa; music by Cesare Pugni
- Le papillon (1860) – choreography by Marie Taglioni; music by Jacques Offenbach
- La source (1866) – choreography by Arthur Saint-Léon; music by Léo Delibes and Léon Minkus
- Coppélia (1870) – choreography by Arthur Saint-Léon, music by Léo Delibes
