= Marie Taglioni =

Italian ballet dancer (1804–1884)

- Comtesse de Voisins
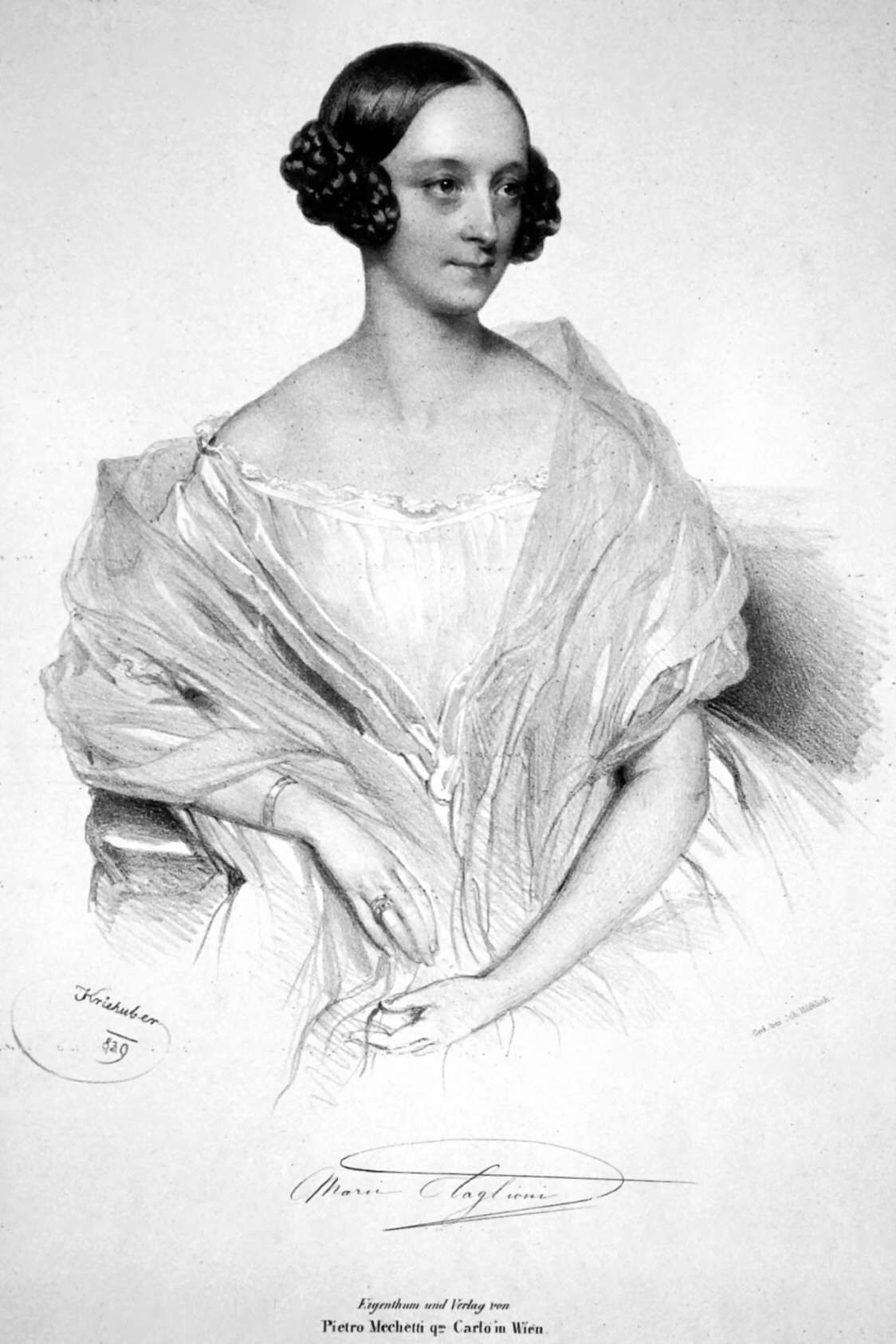
- Taglioni in an 1839 lithograph
- Born: 23 April 1804; Stockholm, Sweden
- Died: 22 April 1884 (aged 79); Marseille, France
- Spouse: Comte Auguste Gilbert de Voisins
- Issue: Georges Philippe Marie Gilbert de Voisins; Eugenie Marie Edwige Gilbert de Voisins
- Father: Filippo Taglioni
- Mother: Sophie Karsten
- Occupation: danseuse
- Years active: 1824–1847
- Known for: La Sylphide, other romantic ballets
- Relatives: Paul Taglioni (brother)

Marie Taglioni, Comtesse de Voisins (23 April 1804 – 22 April 1884) was a Swedish-born ballet dancer of the Romantic ballet era partially of Italian descent, a central figure in the history of European dance. She spent most of her life in the Austrian Empire and France. She was one of the most celebrated ballerinas of the romantic ballet, which was cultivated primarily at Her Majesty's Theatre in London and at the Théâtre de l'Académie Royale de Musique of the Paris Opera Ballet. She is credited with (though not confirmed as) being the first ballerina to truly dance en pointe.

== Early life ==
Taglioni was born in Stockholm, Sweden, to the Italian choreographer Filippo Taglioni and the Swedish ballet dancer Sophie Karsten, maternal granddaughter of the Swedish opera singer Christoffer Christian Karsten and of the Polish opera singer and actress Sophie Stebnowska. Her brother, Paul (1808–1884), was also a dancer and an influential choreographer; they performed together early in their careers.

== Marriage ==
Taglioni was married to Comte Auguste Gilbert de Voisins in 1835, but separated in 1836. She later fell in love with Eugene Desmares, a loyal fan, who had defended her honour in a duel. Desmares and Taglioni gave birth to an (illegitimate) child in 1836. Three years later Desmares died in a hunting accident. In 1842 she gave birth to her second child. It is unknown who the father is even though the birth certificate states the father as Gilbert de Voisins. Taglioni's children's names were Count Georges Philippe Marie Gilbert de Voisins and Eugenie-Marie (Edwige) Gilbert de Voisins. Later Georges Gilbert de Voisins married Sozonga Ralli, heiress of wealthy Greek-born Ralli family, while Eugenie married Russian Prince Alexander Trubetskoy, with whom he had five children and settled between their villa on the shores of Lake Como and their residence in Paris. A granddaughter of Marie Taglioni, Princess Sophia Trubetskoy married a scion of Greek-born prominent Recanati banking family.

== Training ==
Taglioni moved to Vienna with her family at a very young age where she began her ballet training under the direction of Jean-Francois Coulon and her father. After Filippo was appointed the ballet master at the court opera in Vienna there was a decision that Marie would debut in the Habsburg capital. Even though Marie had trained with Coulon, her technique was not up to the standards that would impress the Viennese audiences. Her father then created a rigorous six-month training regimen for his daughter where she would hold positions for 100 counts. The training was conducted daily and consisted of two hours in the morning with difficult exercises focusing on her legs and two hours in the afternoon focusing on adagio movements that would help her refine poses in ballet. Taglioni had a rounded back that caused her to lean forward and had "slightly distorted proportions". She worked hard to disguise her physical limitations by increasing range of motion and developing her strength. Taglioni focused her energy on her shape and form to the audience and less on bravura tricks and pirouettes. In Vienna, Marie danced her first ballet choreographed by her father titled "La Reception d'une Jeune Nymphe à la Cour de Terpsichore".

== Career ==
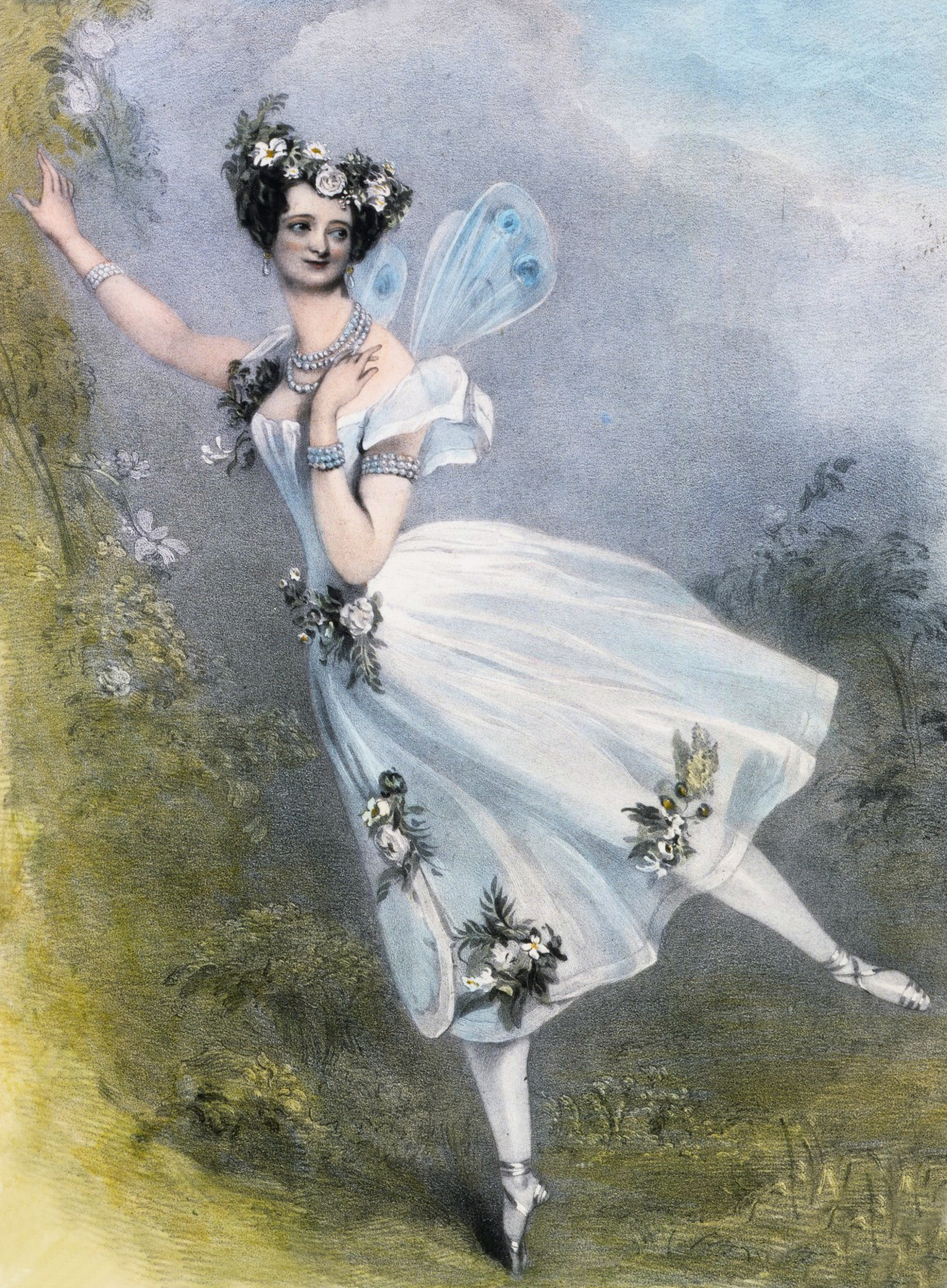
Lithograph by Chalon and Lane of Marie Taglioni as Flora in Didelot's Zéphire et Flore. London, 1831 (Victoria and Albert Museum/Sergeyev Collection)

Before joining the Paris Opéra, Taglioni danced in both Munich and Stuttgart, and at age 23 debuted in another ballet choreographed by her father called "La Sicilien" that jump-started her ballet career. Taglioni rose to fame as a danseuse at the Paris Opéra when her father created the ballet La Sylphide (1832) for her. Designed as a showcase for Taglioni's talent, it was the first ballet where dancing en pointe had an aesthetic rationale and was not merely an acrobatic stunt, often involving ungraceful arm movements and exertions, as had been the approach of dancers in the late 1820s.

== Pas de Quatre ==
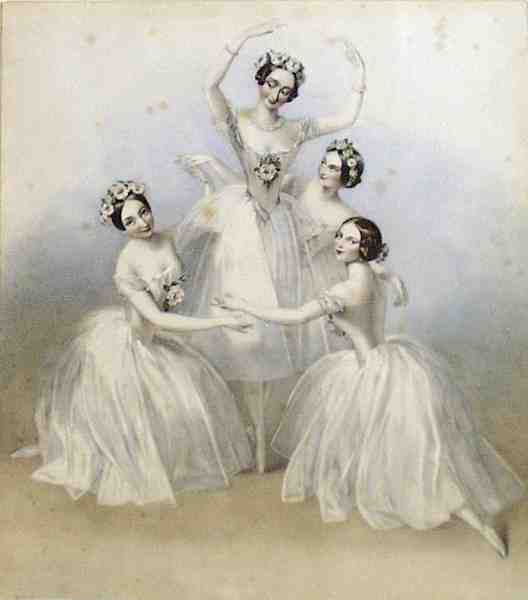
Taglioni (center) in Pas de Quatre, 1845

In 1837 Taglioni left the Ballet of Her Majesty's Theatre to take up a three-year contract in Saint Petersburg with the Imperial Ballet (known today as the Kirov/Mariinsky Ballet). It was in Russia after her last performance in the country (1842) and at the height of the "cult of the ballerina", that a pair of her pointe shoes were sold for two hundred rubles, reportedly to be cooked, served with a sauce and eaten by a group of balletomanes.

In July 1845, she danced with Lucile Grahn, Carlotta Grisi, and Fanny Cerrito in Jules Perrot's Pas de Quatre, a ballet representing Taglioni's ethereal qualities that was based on Alfred Edward Chalon’s lithographic prints. Pas de Quatre was originally choreographed to be presented to Queen Victoria, who attended the third performance.

== Retirement, last years and death ==
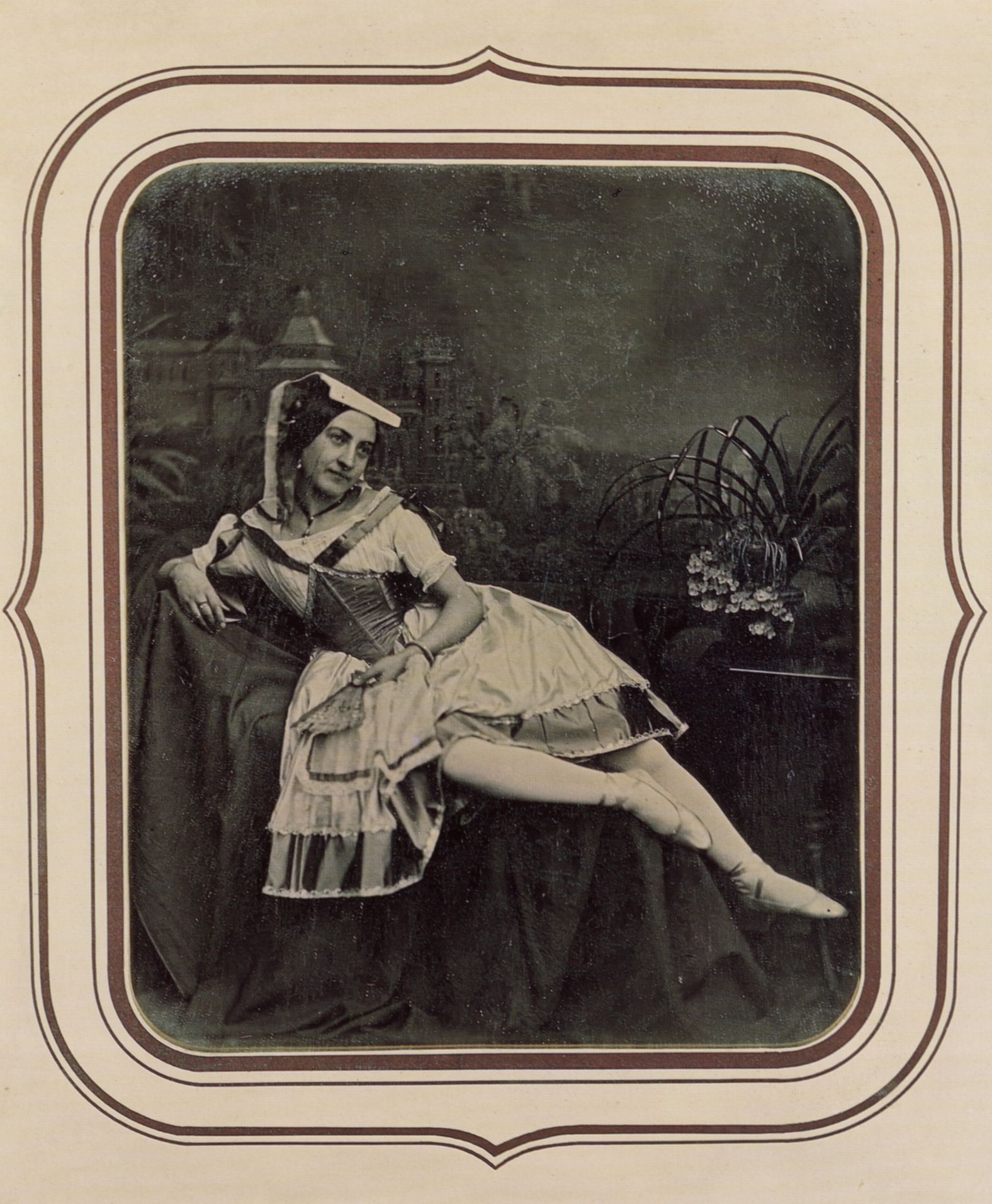
Taglioni, ca 1845

Taglioni retired from performing in 1847; for a time she took up residence at the Ca' d'Oro on the Grand Canal in Venice. When the ballet of the Paris Opéra was reorganized on stricter, more professional lines, she was its guiding spirit. With the director of the new Conservatoire de danse, Lucien Petipa, and Petipa's former pupil, the choreographer Louis Mérante, she figured on the six-member select jury of the first annual competition for the corps de ballet, held on 13 April 1860.

Her only choreographic work was Le papillon (1860) for her student Emma Livry, who is remembered for dying in 1863 when her costume was set alight by a gas lamp used for stage lighting. Johann Strauss II composed the "Marie Taglioni Polka" (Op. 173) in honour of Marie Taglioni's niece, Marie "Paul" Taglioni, also known as "Marie the Younger". The two women, having the same name, have often been conflated, or confused with each other.

Later in England, she taught social dance and ballroom to children and society ladies in London; she also took a limited number of ballet pupils. She resided at #14 Connaught Square, London from 1875 to 1876.

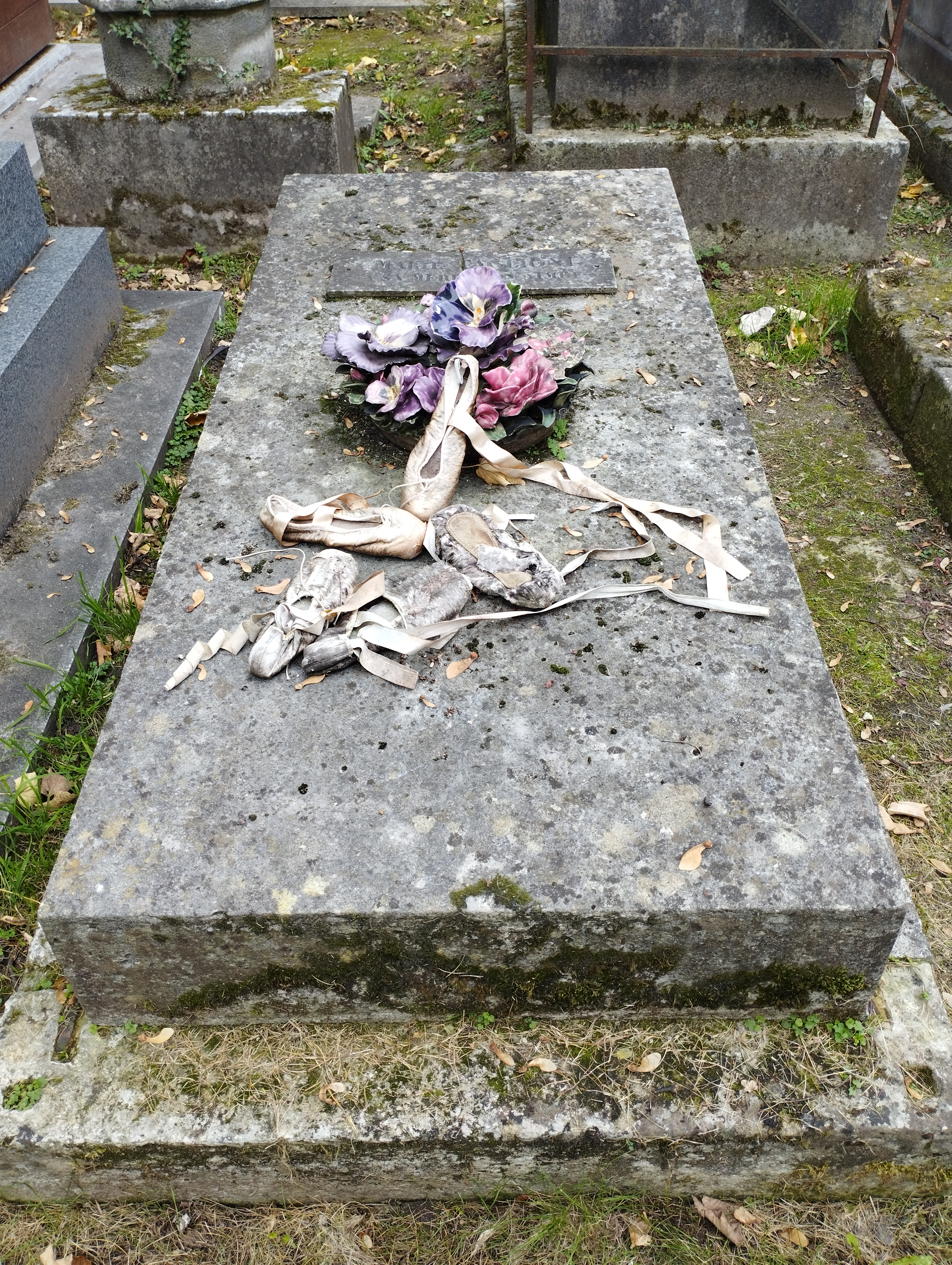
Possible tomb in Montmartre, with 'offerings' of ballet shoes.

Taglioni died poor in Marseille on 22 April 1884, the day before her 80th birthday. Her body was moved to Paris. There is some debate over whether she is buried in Montmartre or in Père Lachaise, or if the Montmartre site belongs to her mother. The local dancers began leaving their worn pointe shoes on the Montmartre grave as a tribute and thanks to the first pointe dancer.

== See also ==
- List of dancers
- Women in dance

== Sources ==
- This article incorporates text from a publication now in the public domain: Chisholm, Hugh, ed. (1911). "Taglioni, Maria". Encyclopædia Britannica. Vol. 26 (11th ed.). Cambridge University Press.
- Wurzbach, Constantin von, ed. (1881). "Taglioni, Marie" . Biographisches Lexikon des Kaiserthums Oesterreich [Biographical Encyclopedia of the Austrian Empire] (in German). Vol. 43. pp. 17–23 – via Wikisource.
- This article incorporates text from a publication now in the public domain: Secccombe, Thomas (1898). "Taglioni, Marie". In Lee, Sidney (ed.). Dictionary of National Biography. Vol. 55. London: Smith, Elder & Co.
