= Ghislaine Thesmar =

French ballet dancer (born 1943)

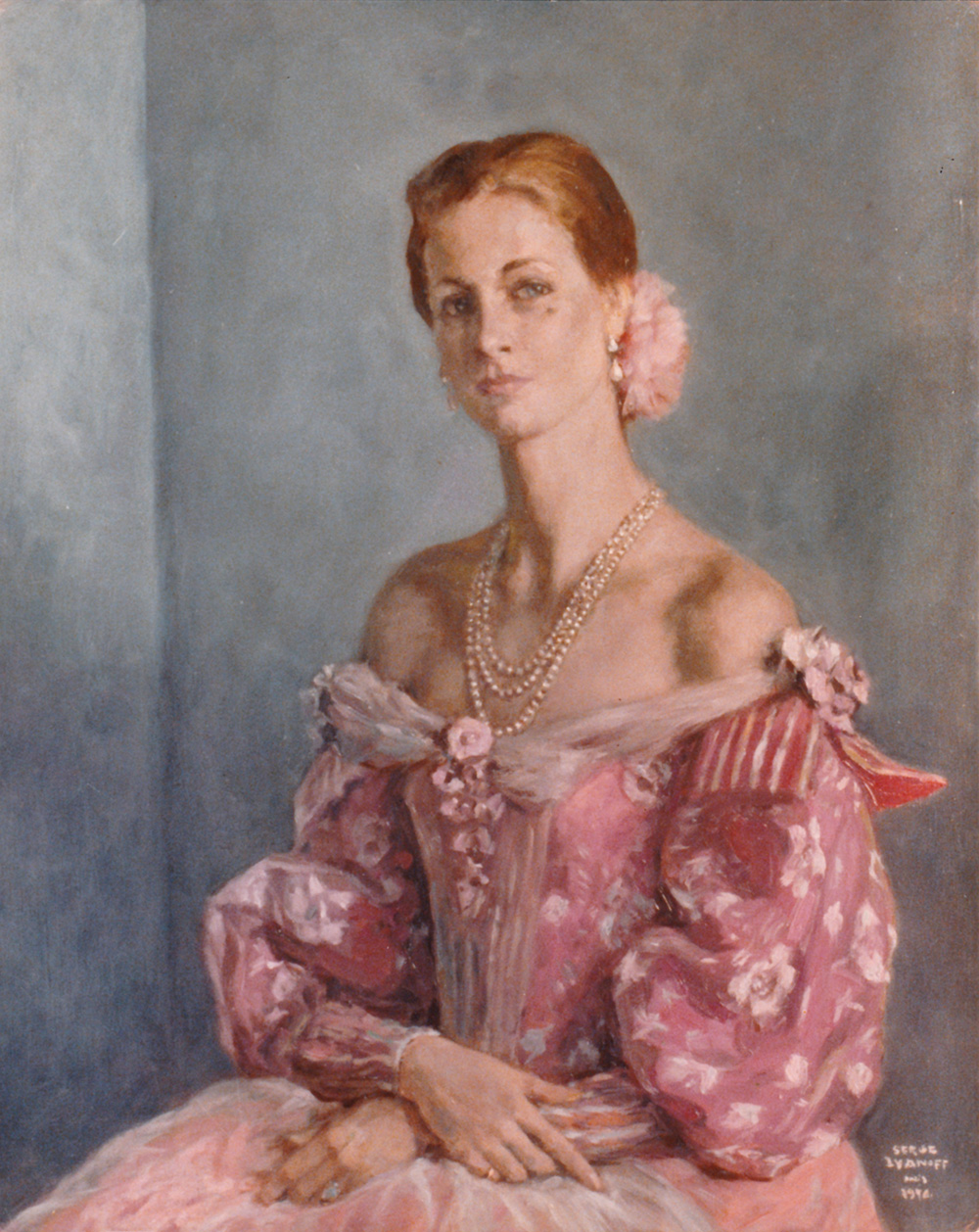
Portrait of Thesmar by Serge Ivanoff, 1976

Ghislaine Thesmar (born 1943) is a French retired ballet dancer and choreographer.

Thesmar was born in 1943 in Beijing, China.

She was married to fellow French ballet dancer and choreographer Pierre Lacotte from 1968 until his death in 2023.

From 1972 to 1985, she was an Étoile (principal dancer) with the Paris Opera Ballet.
