= Karstens =

Karstens is a surname. Notable people with the surname include:

- Jeff Karstens (born 1982), American baseball pitcher
- Harry Karstens (1878–1955), American mountaineer
- George Karstens (1924–2002), American football player
- Gerben Karstens (1942–2022), Dutch cyclist

== See also ==
- Carstens
- Karsten
