= Sophie Stebnowska =

Swedish opera singer

- Zofia Stępkowska
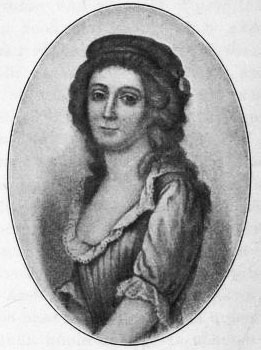
- Sophie Stebnowska
- Born: Zofia Stępkowska; 13 July 1753 or 1761; Warsaw, Poland.
- Died: 16 February 1848 (aged c. 95); Drottningholm, Sweden.
- Other names: Mariane Theresia Sophie Stebnowska, Maria Sofia Stempkosta
- Spouse: Christoffer Christian Karsten

Mariane Theresia Sophie (Maria Sofia) Stebnowska also called Zofia Stępkowska or Stempkosta (13 July 1753 or 1761 – 16 February 1848) was a Swedish opera singer and harpist of Polish origin. She has been referred to as one of the more notable stage artists of the Gustavian era Royal Swedish Opera. She was the maternal grandmother of the famous ballerina Marie Taglioni.

== Life and career ==
Sophie Stebnowska reportedly arrived to Sweden from Paris in France in the company of the British ambassador to Sweden, Sir Thomas Wroughton, previously ambassador to Poland, with whom she was in a relationship at the time. This would have been in 1778, when Sir Thomas Wroughton left his ambassadorship in Poland for the same office in Sweden.

She married the Swedish opera singer Christoffer Christian Karsten in 1781, and became the mother of the ballet dancer Sophie Karsten and the painter Elisabeth Charlotta Karsten. At their wedding, they were granted the use of the Villa Canton at Drottningholm by king Gustav III of Sweden. The couple enjoyed an active social life in the circles of the artistic world of Stockholm and also frequented the circles around the royal court.

Sophie Stebnowska was engaged at the Royal Swedish Opera in December 1782 and given a contract for life as a premier actress on 25 February 1790. She was regarded to belong to the elite artists of the opera. She made her last appearance on the state in 1803, and retired from the opera in 1806.

Stebnowska was also an acknowledged harpist. In March 1795, she participated in a concert in the Stockholm Stock Exchange Building with her spouse and Marie Louise Marcadet, where each of them first performed alone, after which she accompanied the duet singing of her husband and Marcadet by playing the harp.

Sophie Stebnowska Karsten died at Drottningholm in 1848, aged 95.

== Legacy ==
Gustav Löwenhielm mentioned her importance in Swedish theater and opera history in the 19th century, during a discussion about the employment of foreign artists, when he pointed out that several of the artists during the foundation of the Royal Swedish Opera and the Royal Dramatic Theatre had been foreigners:

"Is it impossible to engage Mr Berg and Miss Schoultz? - Generally, I can not see how we can elude the employment of half grown foreigners. Gustav III's Swedish national theatre started with the Danish Mrs Müller, the French Mrs Marcadet, the German Mamsell Stading, the German Mrs Augusti and the Polish Mrs Karsten. These ladies occupied our stage and kept it from the foundation of the opera and the premature departure of Mrs Olin in the beginning of the 1780s, until the year of 1800, when the school of Mrs Desguillons had created Mamsell Wässelia cum celeris."
