= Jean Schneitzhoeffer =

French composer

Jean Madeleine Marie Schneitzhöeffer (13 October 1785 – 14 October 1852) was a French composer.

== Life ==
Born in Toulouse, Schneitzhöeffer was a student of Charles Simon Catel at the Conservatoire de Paris. He won second prize for piano in 1803 and then joined the Opéra as a timpanist in 1815, where (seven years later) he was made chef de chant. Made a professor of choral singing at the Conservatoire, he was granted the Legion of Honour in 1840. He died in Paris.

== Works ==
He composed several ballet scores for the Opéra de Paris, including :

- Mars et Vénus
- Le Sicilien
- Proserpine (1818)
- Le Séducteur au village (1818)
- Zémire et Azor (1824)
- Les Filets de Vulcain (1826)
- La Sylphide, for Marie Taglioni (1832)
- La Tempête (1834)
