= Women in dance =

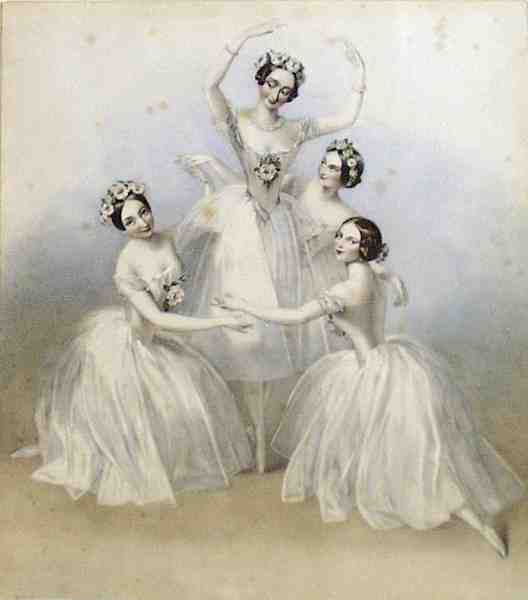
Lithograph by A. E. Chalon of (left to right) Carlotta Grisi, Marie Taglioni, Lucille Grahn and Fanny Cerrito in Pas de Quatre, 1845

The important place of women in dance can be traced back to the origins of civilization. Cave paintings, Egyptian frescos, Indian statuettes, ancient Greek and Roman art and records of court traditions in China and Japan all testify to the important role women played in ritual and religious dancing from the start. In the Middle Ages, what has become known as ballet had its beginnings in "highly ritualized court entertainment in Renaissance Italy" with male and female dancers drawn from the aristocracy. It was in late 17th-century France, however, that the Paris Opera produced the first celebrated ballerinas. While women began to dominate the ballet scene in the 18th century, it was with the advent of Romantic ballet in the 19th century that they became the undisputed centre of attraction with stars playing the leading roles in the works of Marius Petipa, and appearing in theatres across Europe from Milan's La Scala to the Mariinsky Theatre in Saint Petersburg. More recently, women have played a leading role in developing various forms of modern dance including expressionist dance and postmodern dance.

== History ==
=== Antiquity ===
Cave paintings from as long ago as 6000 BC provide scenes of dancing women. Examples can be seen in the Addauta Cave near Palermo and in the Roca dels Moros in Catalonia. In Ancient Egypt, women performed ritual dances for religious ceremonies such as funerals, as illustrated by frescos on the pharaohs' tombs. The oldest records of organised dance and of professional female dancers come from Egypt. Especially in the Old Kingdom, women were organised into groups known as khener, apparently being joined by men only at a later stage.

In the Indian subcontinent, there is early evidence of dancing women, most notably a bronze statuette from Mohenjo-daro in the Indus Valley dating from around 2500 BC. While men's early participation in dancing rituals appears to have been connected to hunting and fighting, women's dance was above all related to fertility, both agricultural and human.

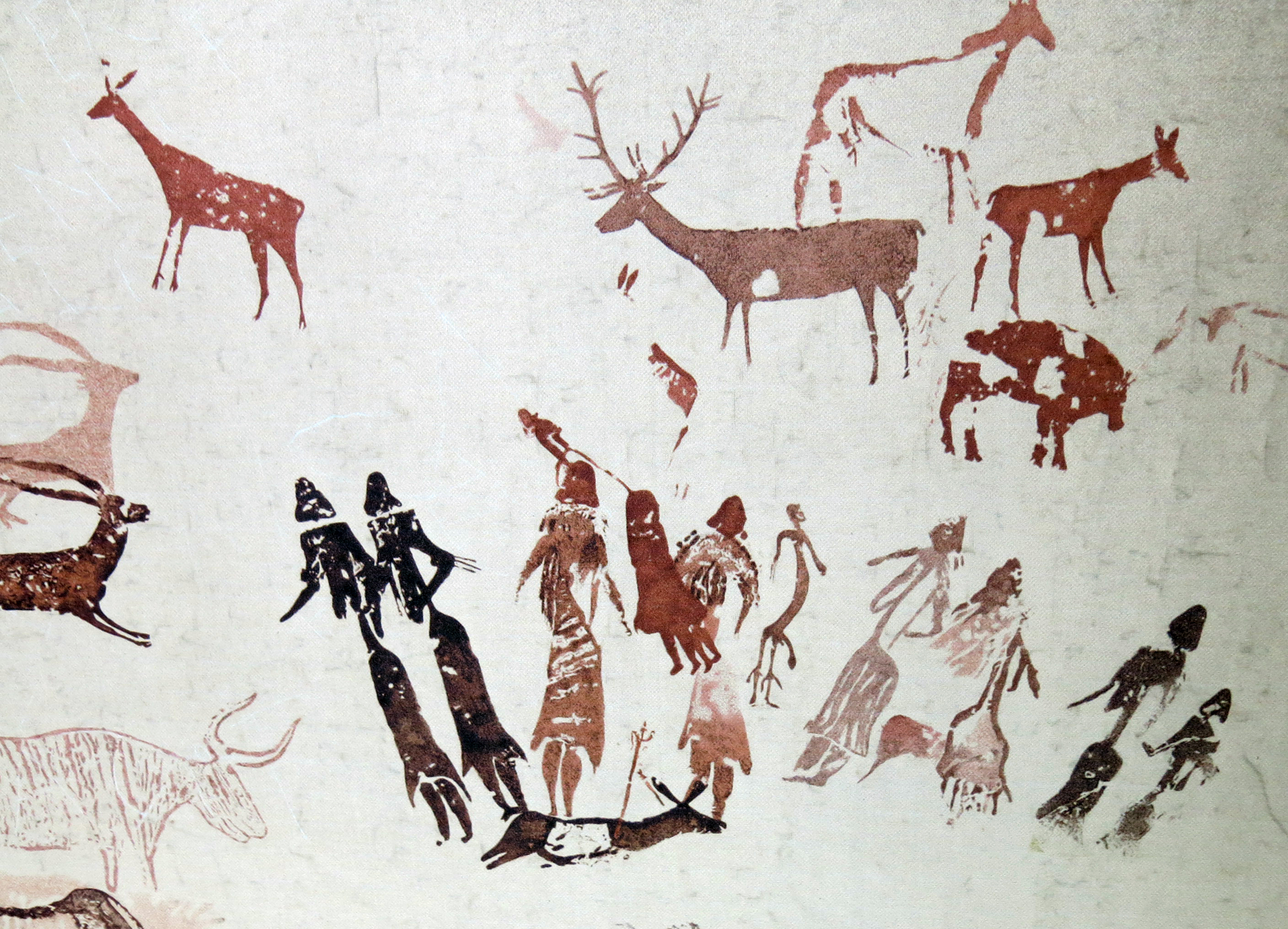
Dancing women, El Cogul caves, Lérida

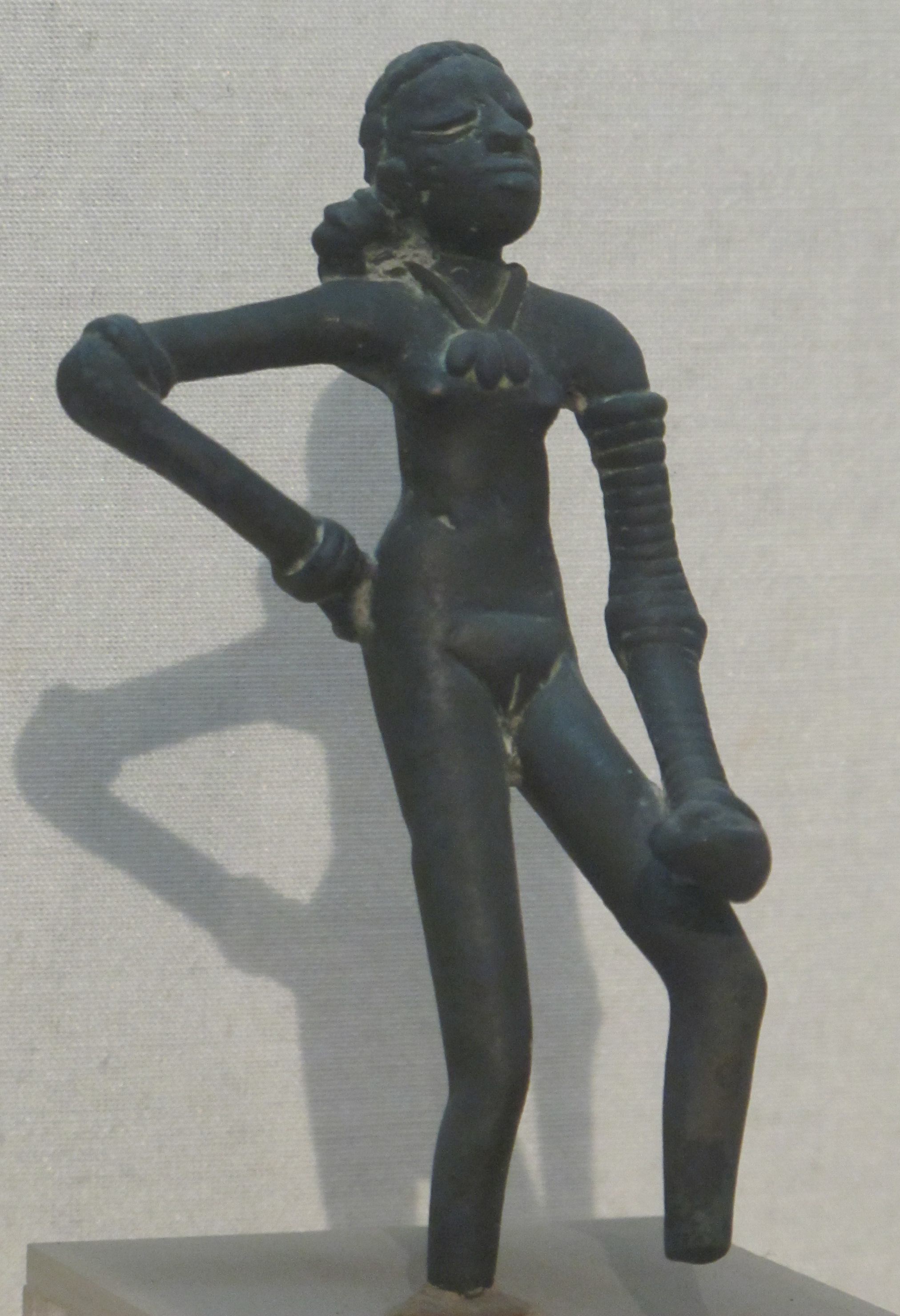
Dancing girl statuette from Mohenjo-daro, 2500-1500 BC

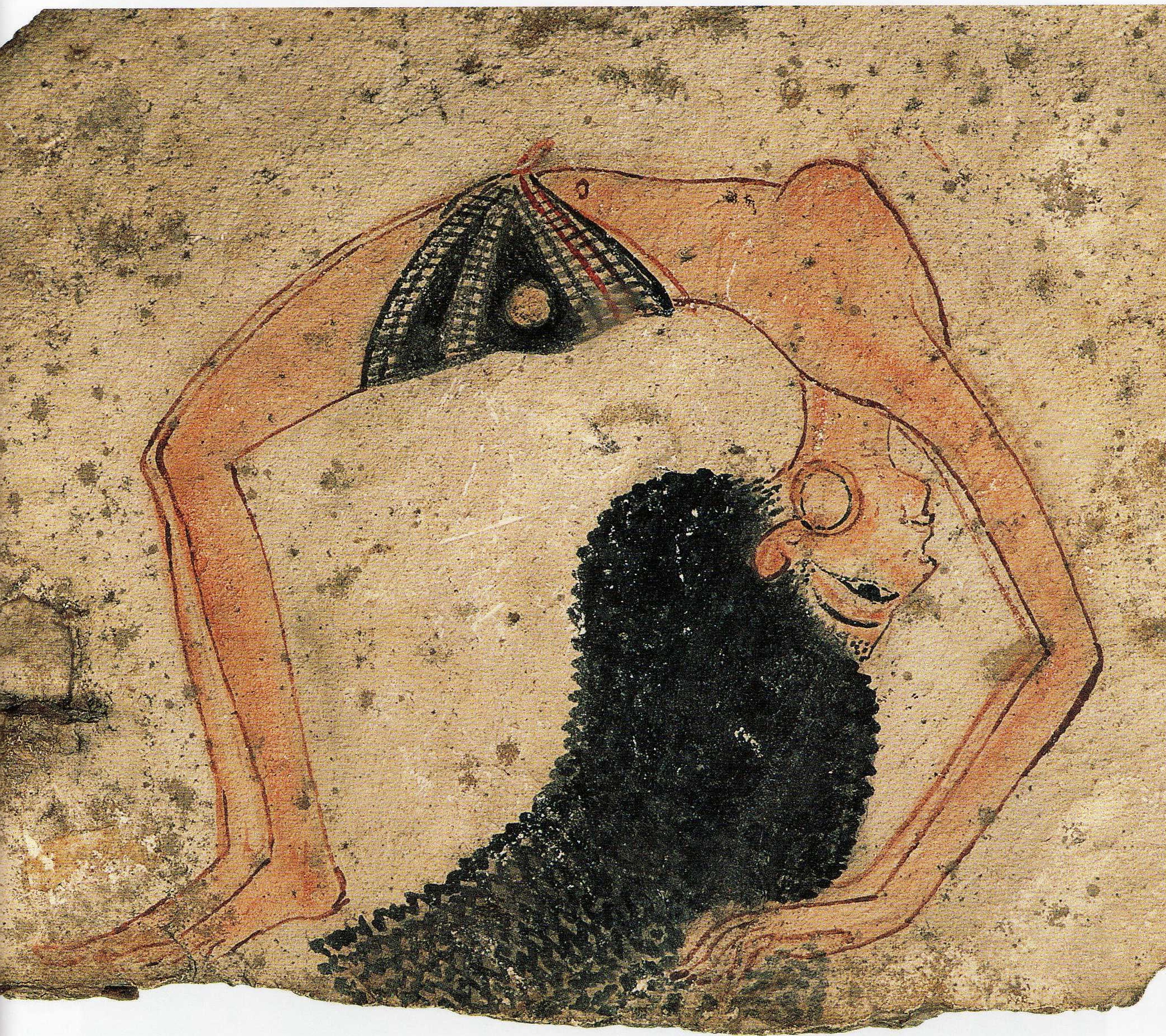
Ancient Egyptian dancer, c. 1200 BC

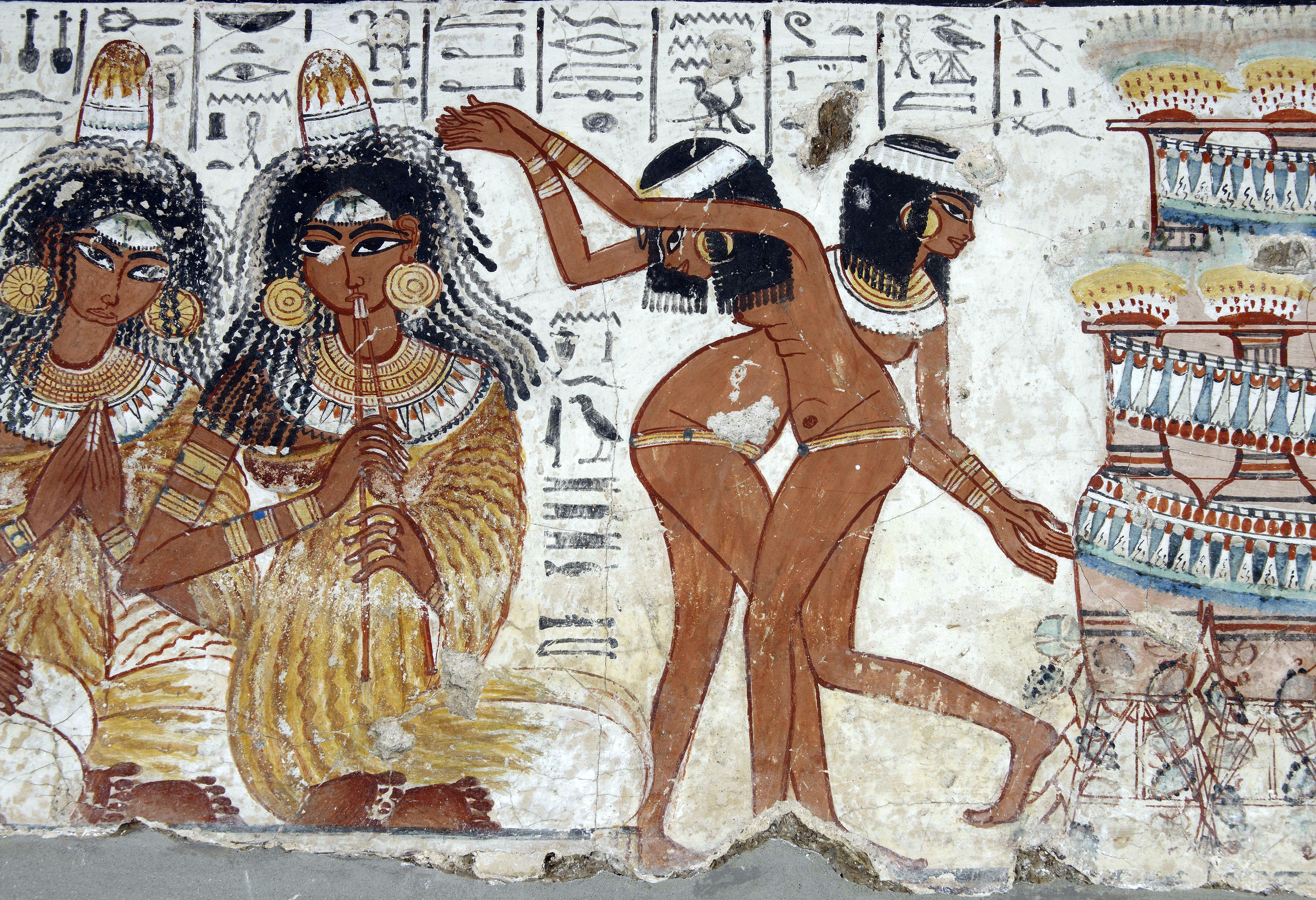
Tomb of Nebamun c. 1400 BC

Dance in classical Crete and Greece seems to have been influenced by the dances of Ancient Egypt. There are many examples of ancient Greek art from the 6th and 5th centuries BC depicting dancing women. The virgins of Delos danced in a circle to honour Apollo while Terpsichore was the Muse of dance. In the 6th century BC, the choros became a lasting feature of Greek theatre while women known as the Dyonysiac, frequently depicted on Greek vases, dance in frenzy, celebrating Dionysus, the god of wine. In Ancient Rome, female singers and dancers performed in the annual celebrations of Isis which included mystery plays representing the resurrection of Osiris.

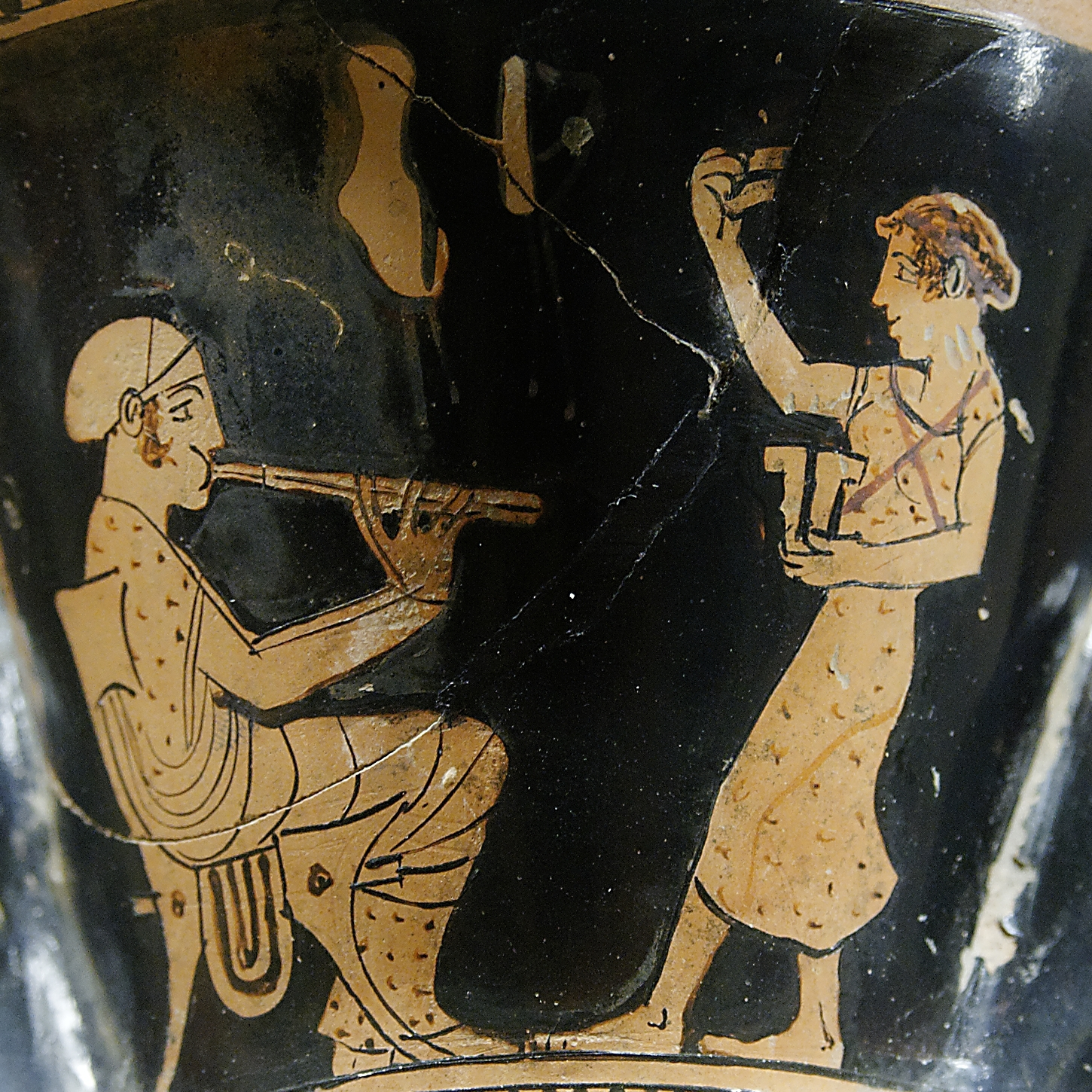
Musician and dancer, Athens, 460 BC

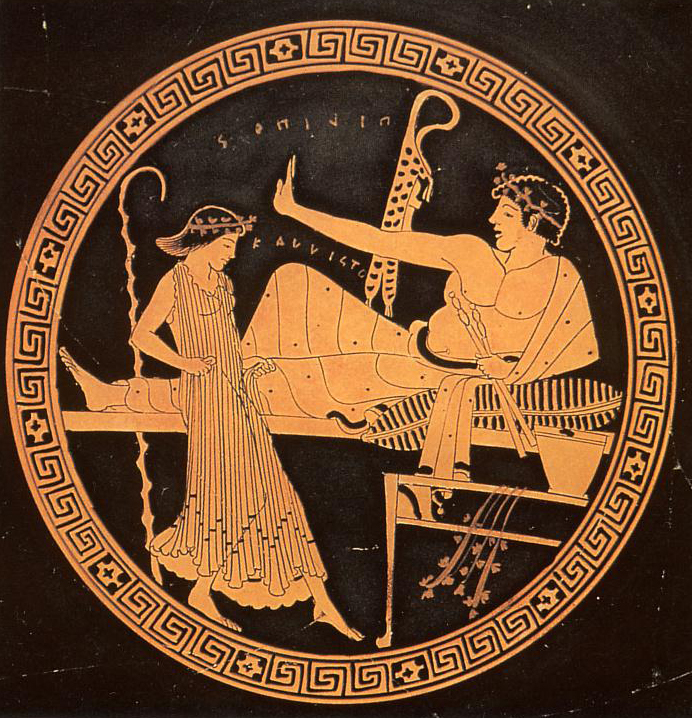
Greek dancing girl, 5th century BC

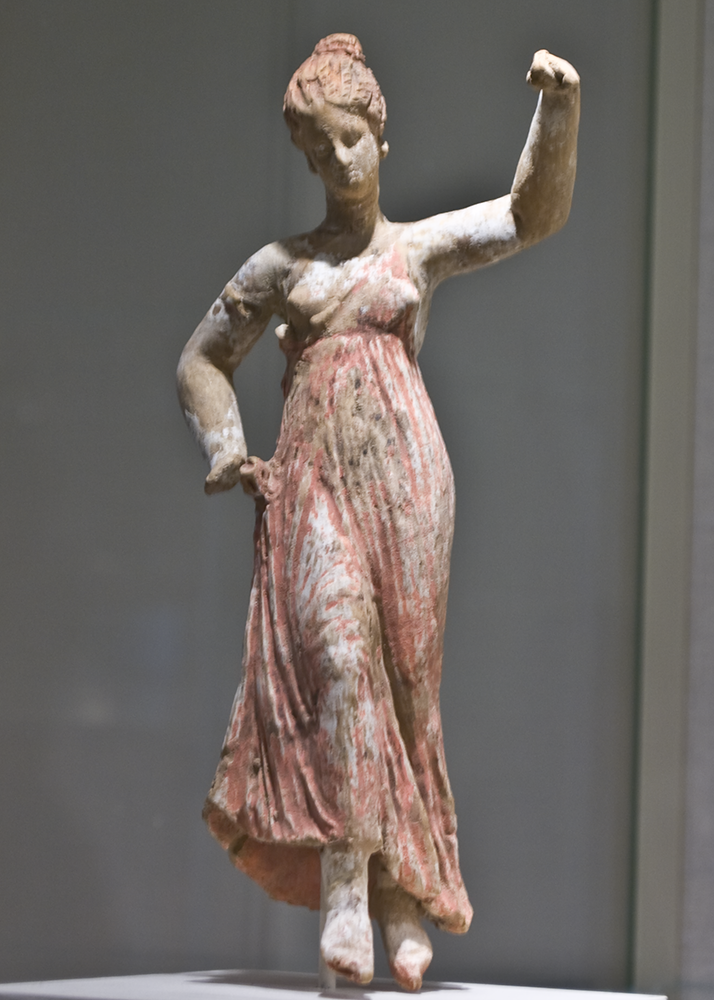
Greek terracotta statuette of a dancing Maenad, 3rd century BC

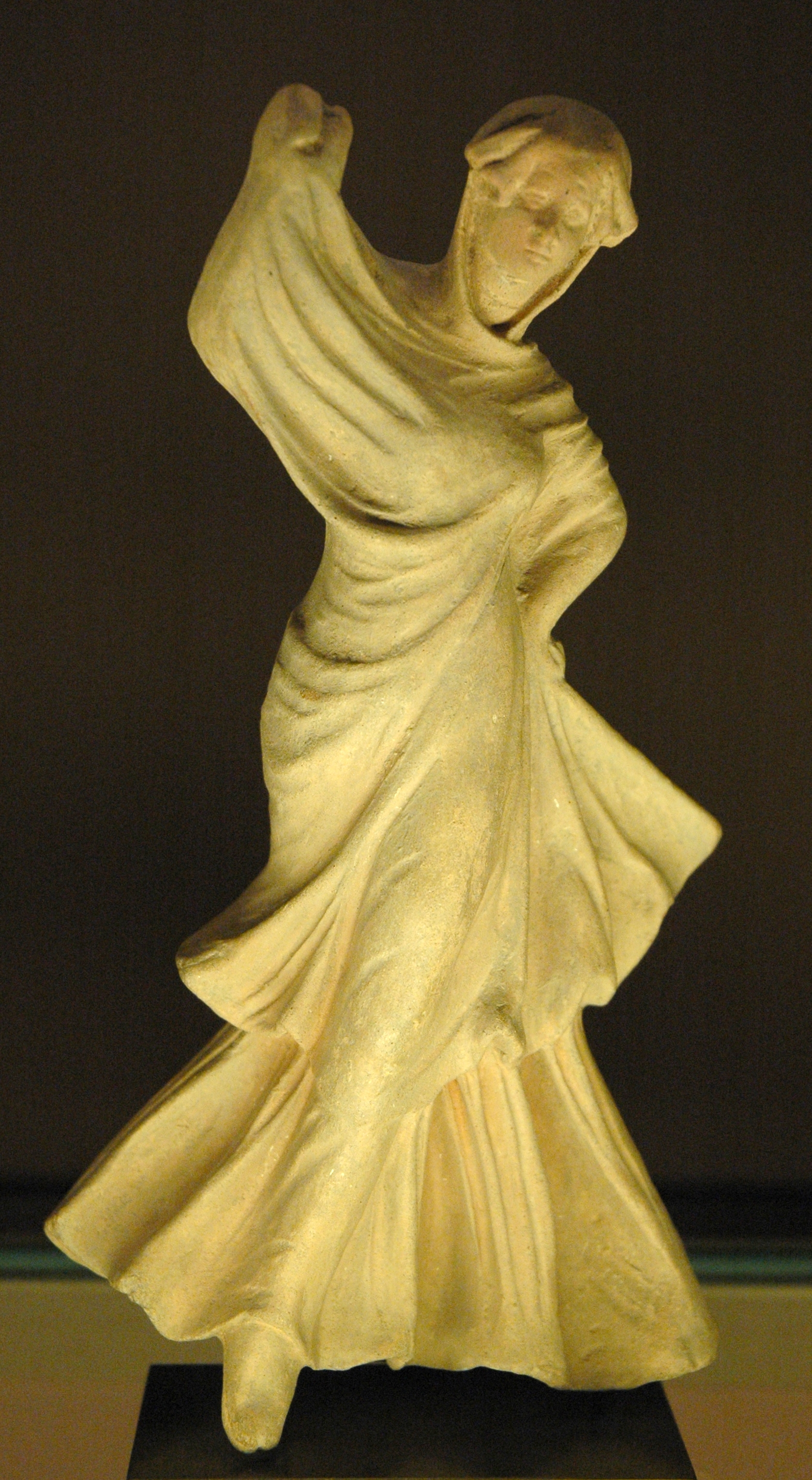
Veiled dancer, terracotta, c. 100 BC

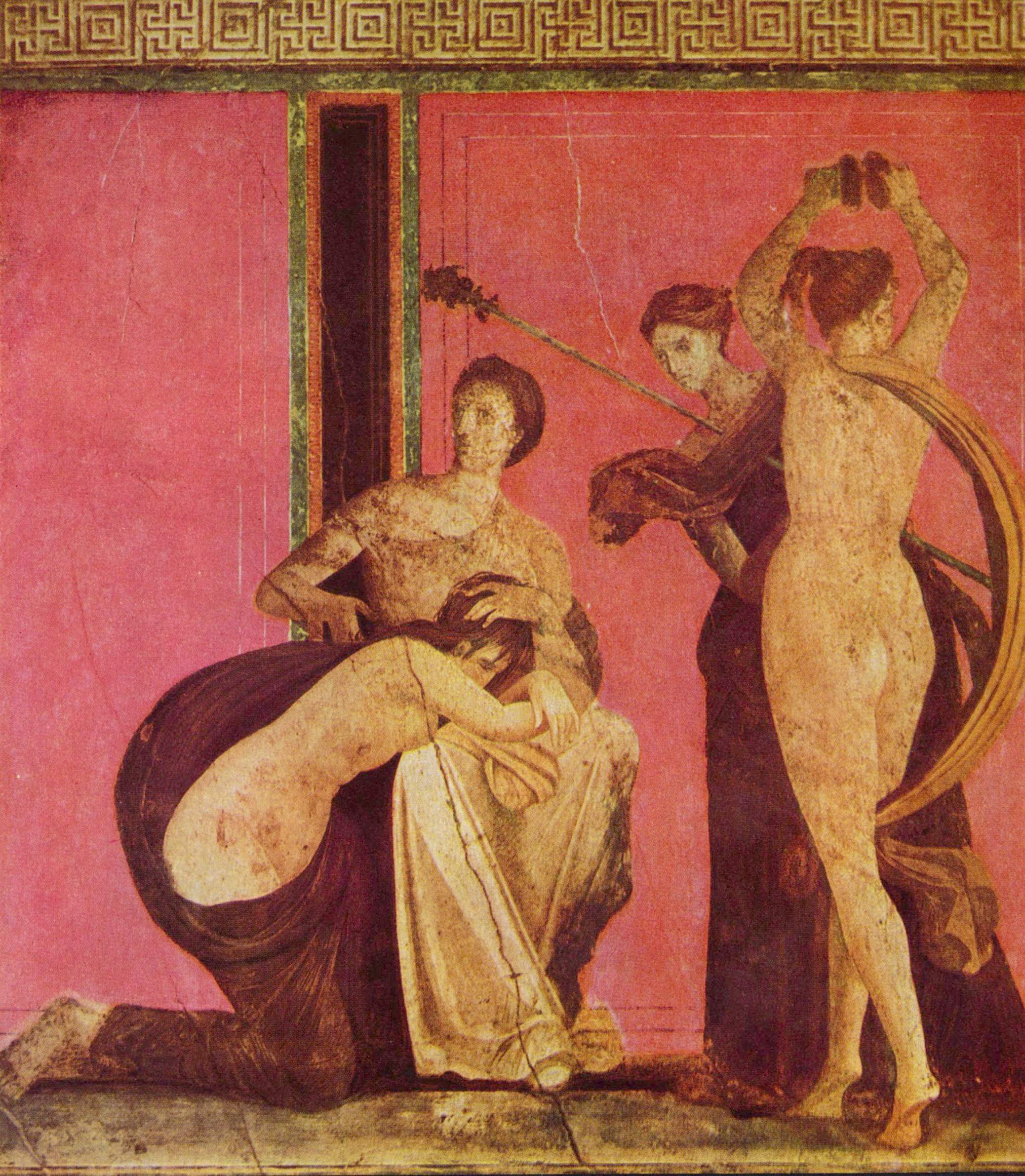
Fresco of Dionysic initiation dance, Pompei, c. 60 BC

The Bible contains several accounts of women dancing, in particular the celebrations led by Miriam after the crossing of the Red Sea when women are said to have danced and played hand-drums. After David had returned from slaying Goliath, women came out singing and dancing. In the New Testament, Matthew tells the story of how Salome danced for Herod in order to be given the head of John the Baptist.

Miriam's dance, Tomić Psalter, c. 1360

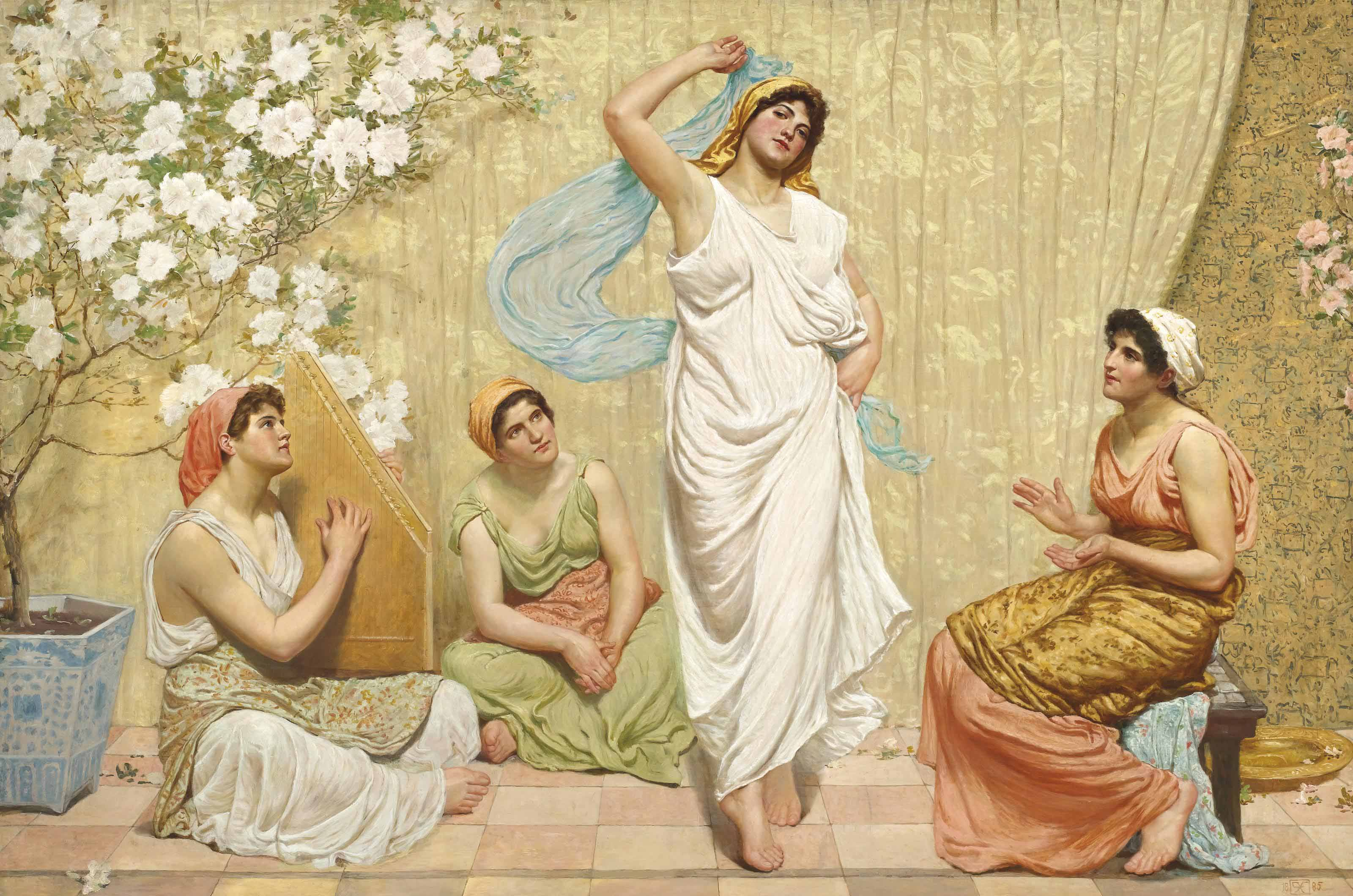
Dance of Salome, Robert Fowler (1885)

=== China and Japan ===
In China, there is a long recorded history of women dancers since the Zhou dynasty (c. 1046–256 BC) reaching a peak in the Tang dynasty (618–907 AD). The chorus dances performed by women in the Zhou dynasty were known as xi. The ancient theatrical spectacles called baixi probably involved dancing girls in dresses with fluttering silk sleeves. Texts from the Spring and Autumn period (771–476 BC) contain descriptions of professional dancing girls while the Nishang Yuyi dance, created by the Emperor Li Longji (685–762), stages virgin women dancing as if in a magic world. In the early 1900s, modern dance was first introduced to China by Nellie Yu Roung Ling, daughter of a Qing-dynasty diplomat to France. She developed a series of dance styles combining Eastern aesthetic with Western technique during her time in the Qing imperial court. In 12th-century Japan, the Shirabyoshi were famous for their dancing and poetry. One of the most famous was the court dancer Shizuka who appears in the Japanese literature of the period.

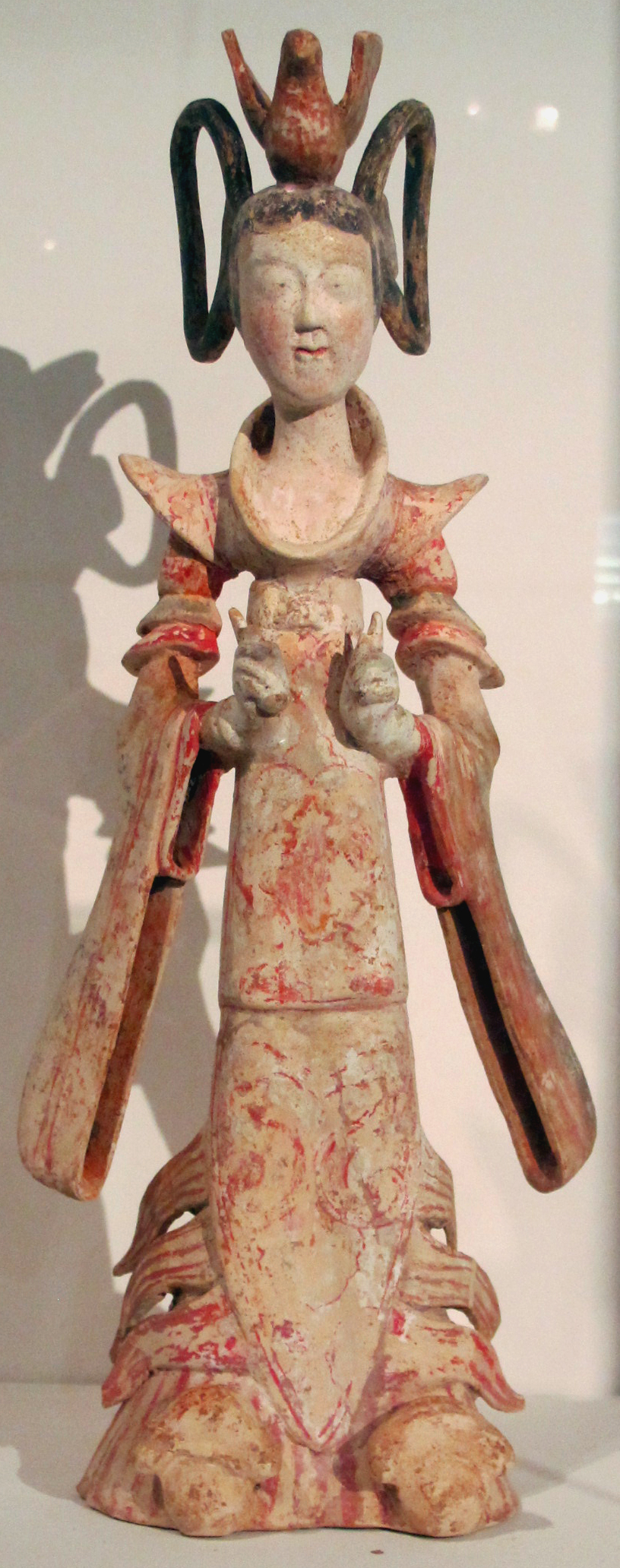
Chinese dancer from the Tang dynasty

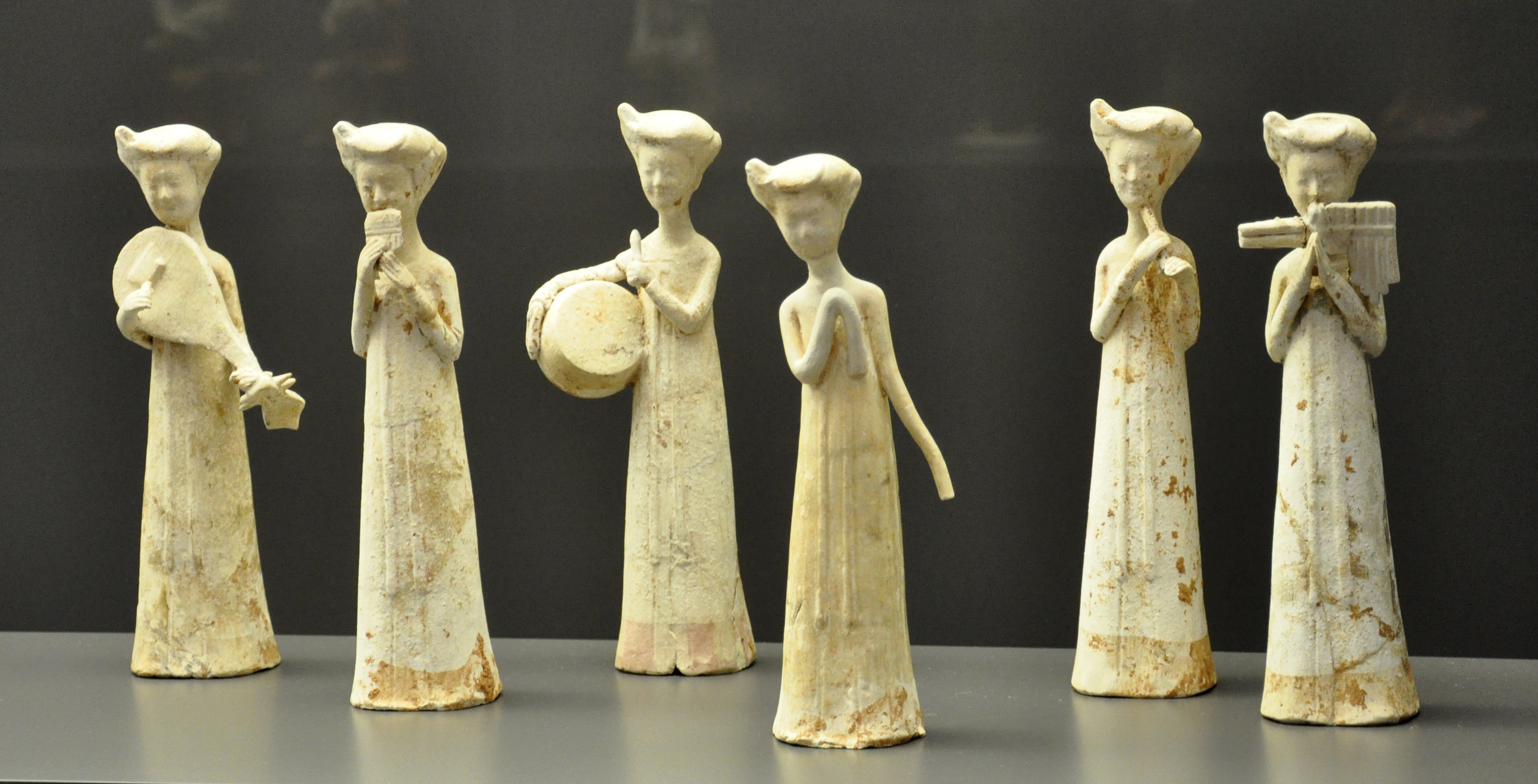
Statuettes of female musicians and a dancer, Sui dynasty (c. 600 AD)

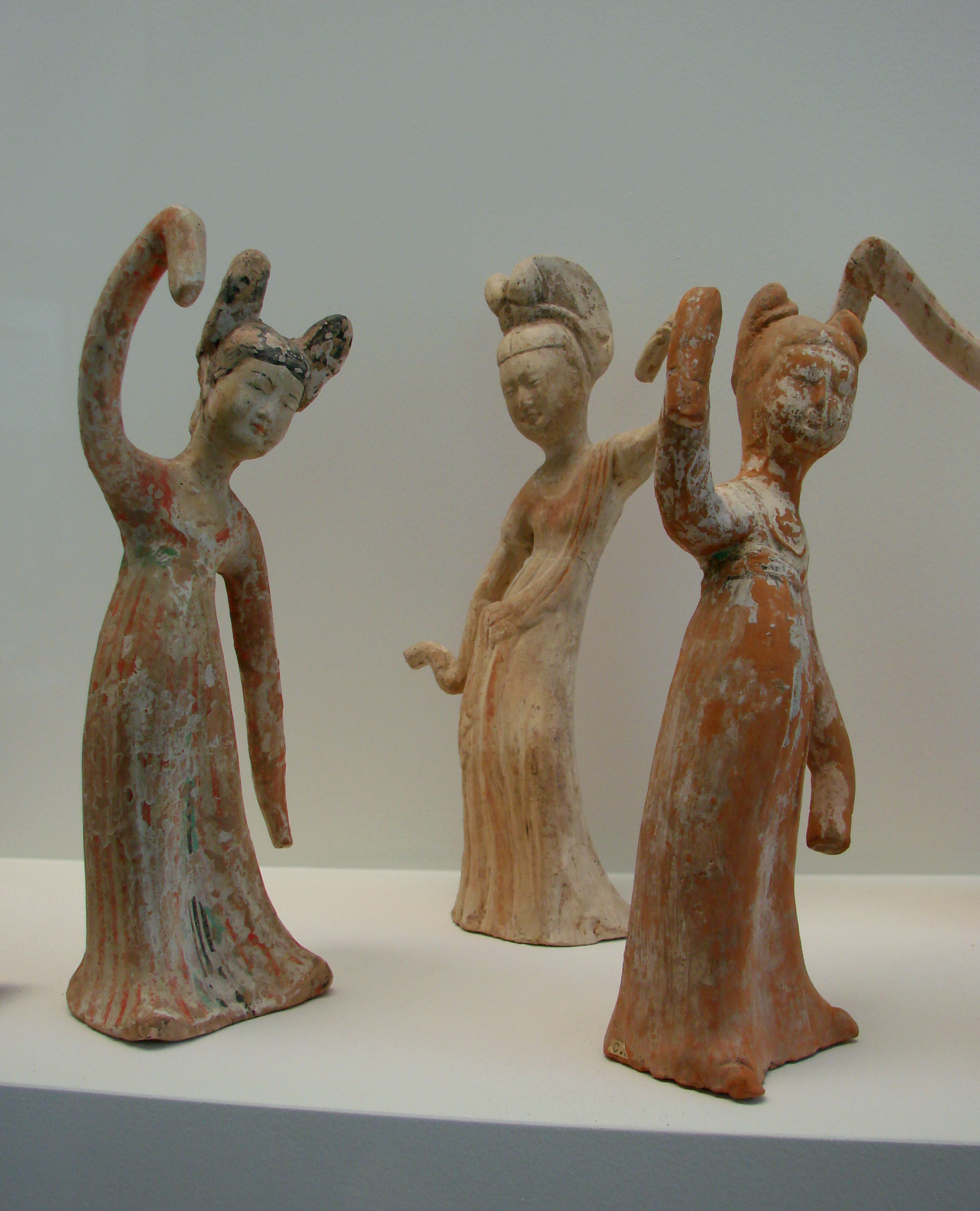
Dancing figures, Tang dynasty, 7th century

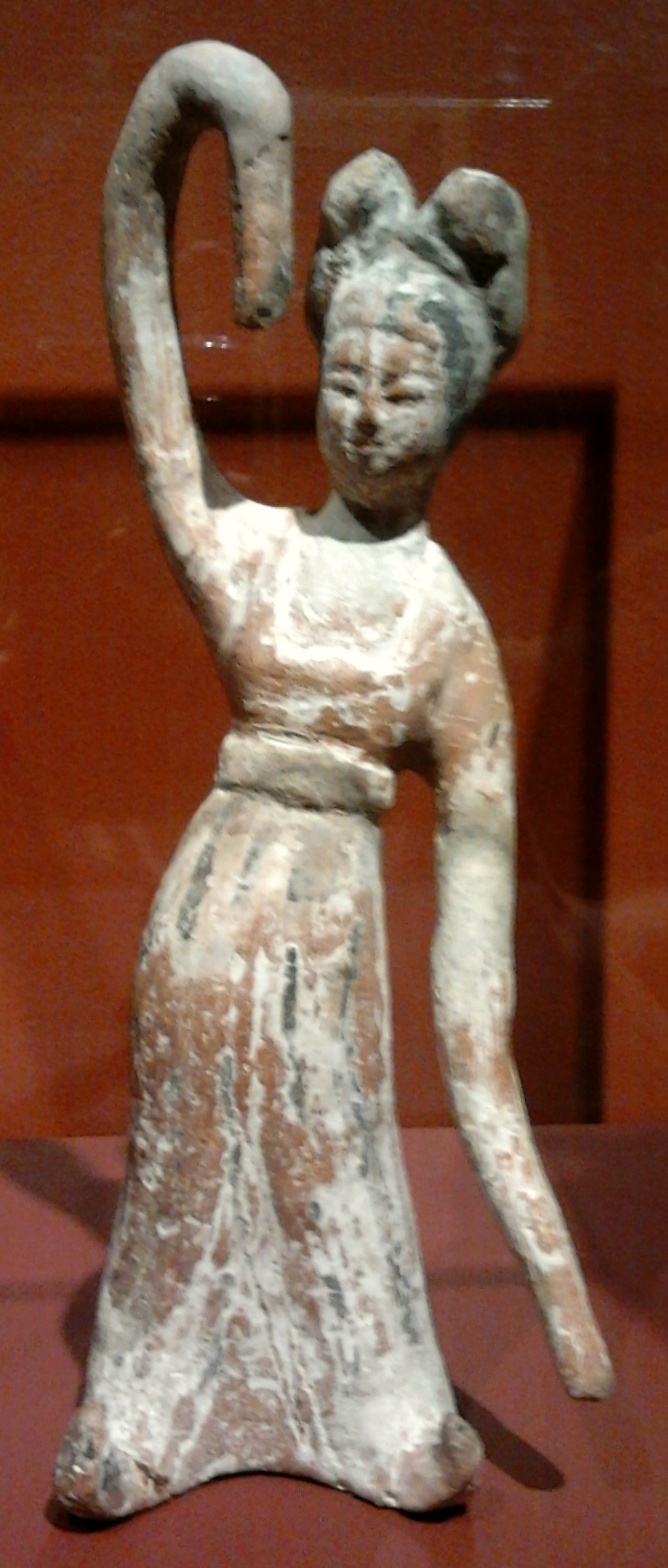
Female dancer from the Tang dynasty

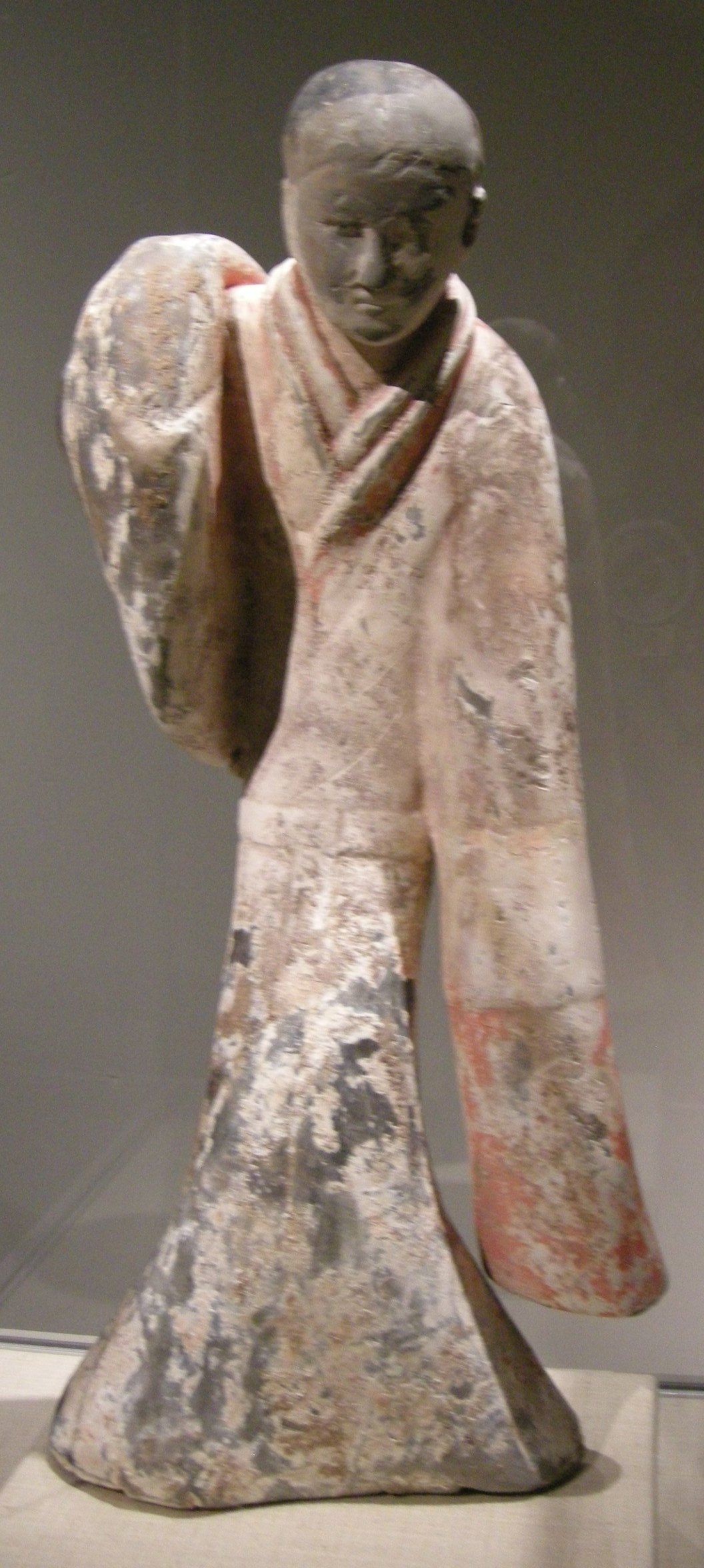
Female dancer, Han dynasty

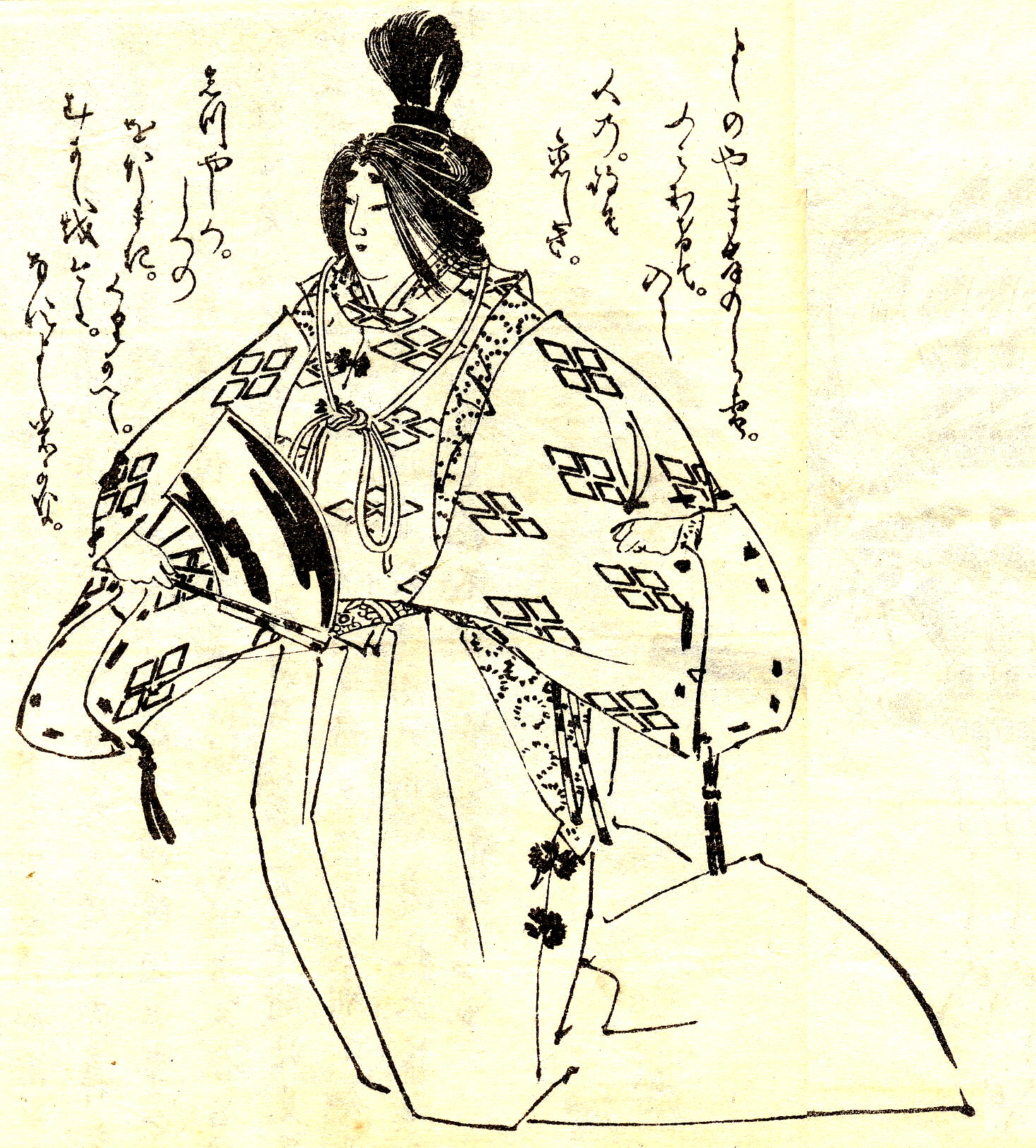
Shizuka from 12th-century Japan

=== India ===
India has nine classical dances. Some are performed exclusively by women such as Mohiniattam. Others are performed with men, such as Kathak.

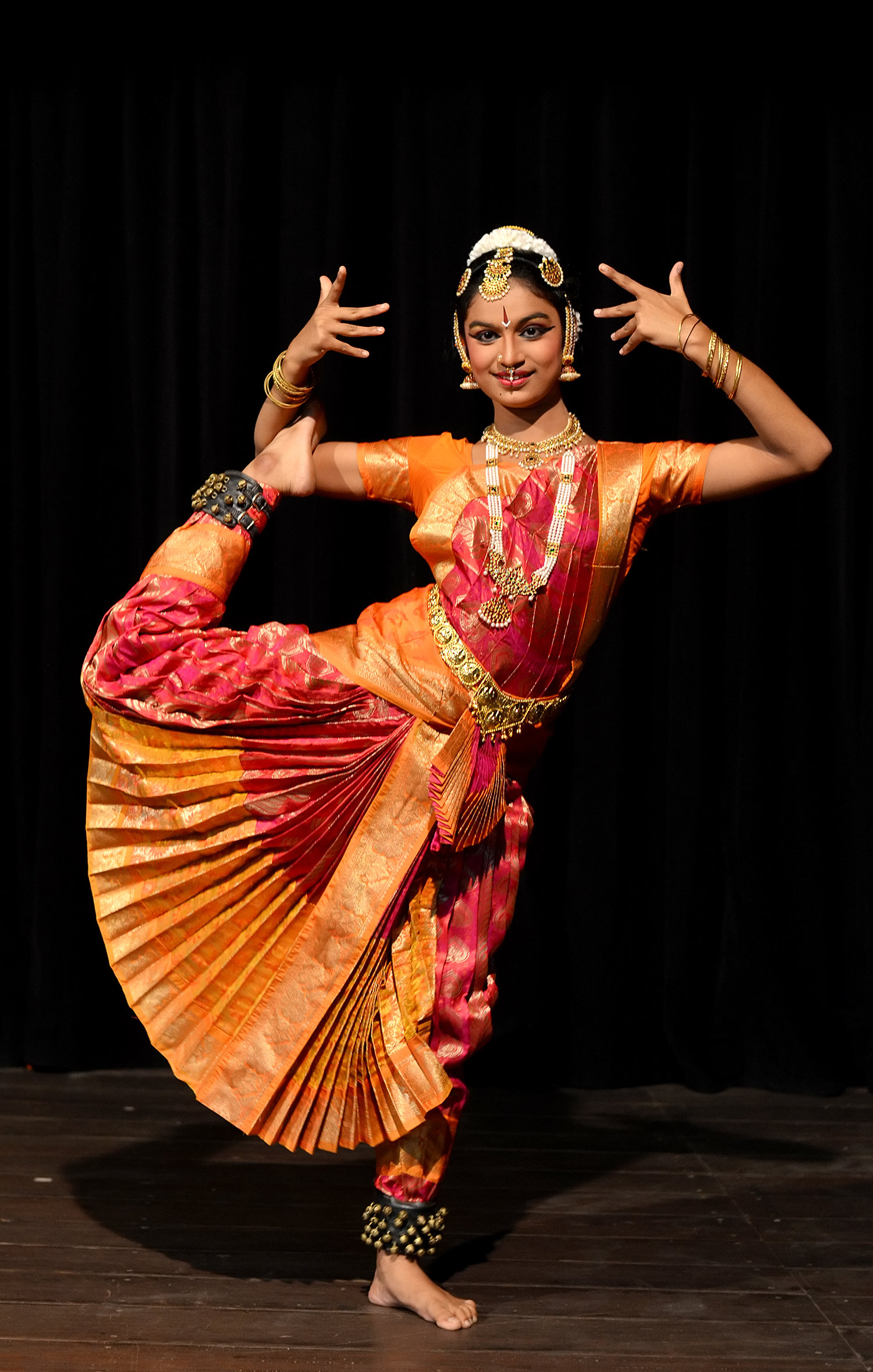
Bharatanatyam

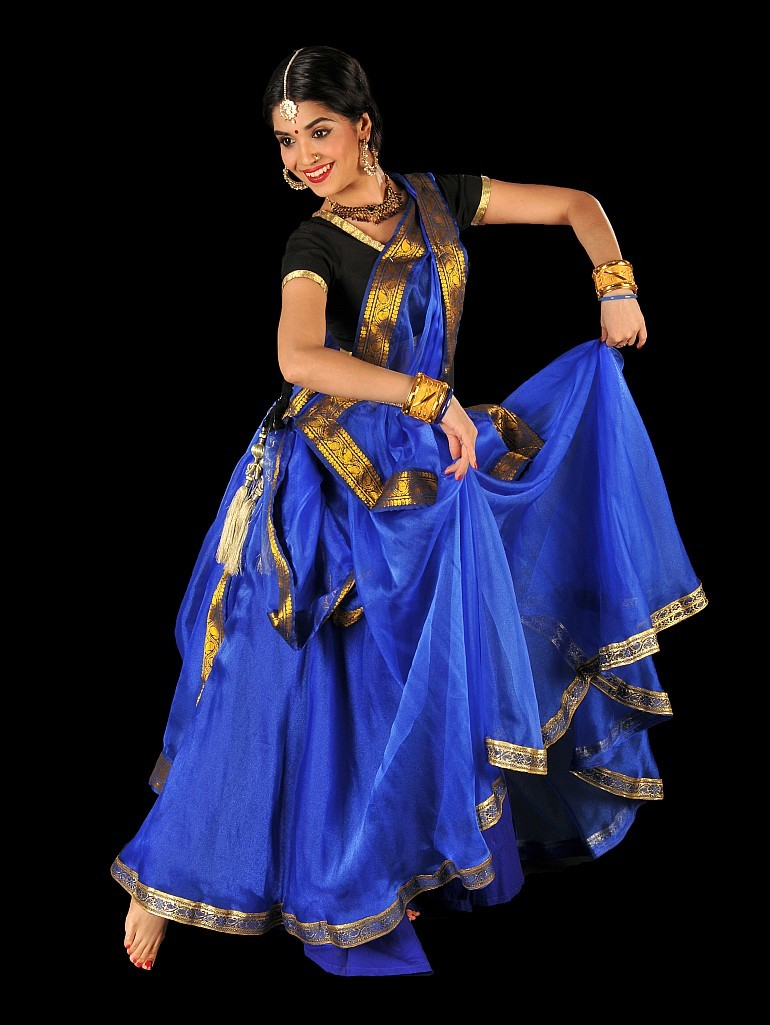
Kathak

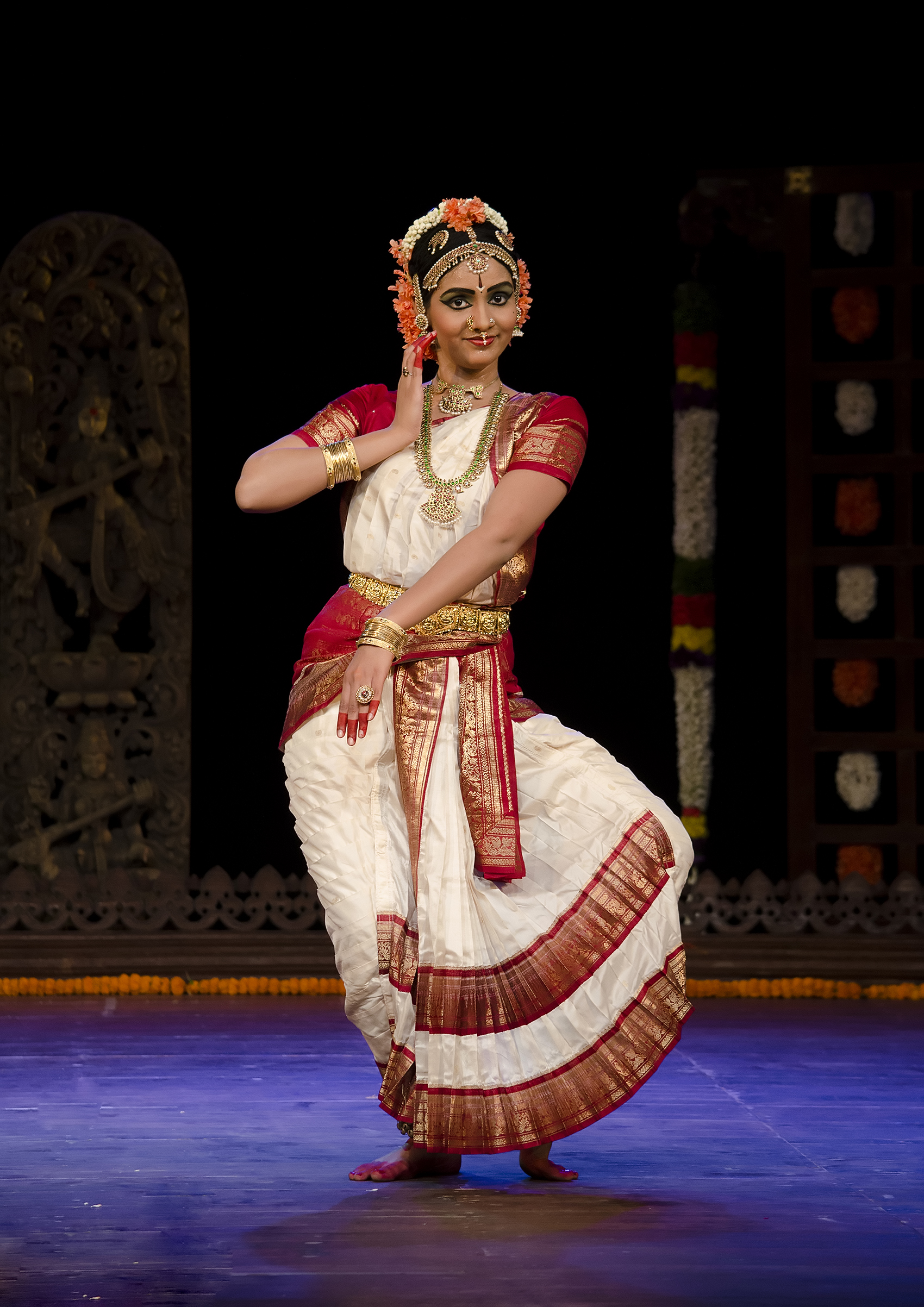
Kuchipudi

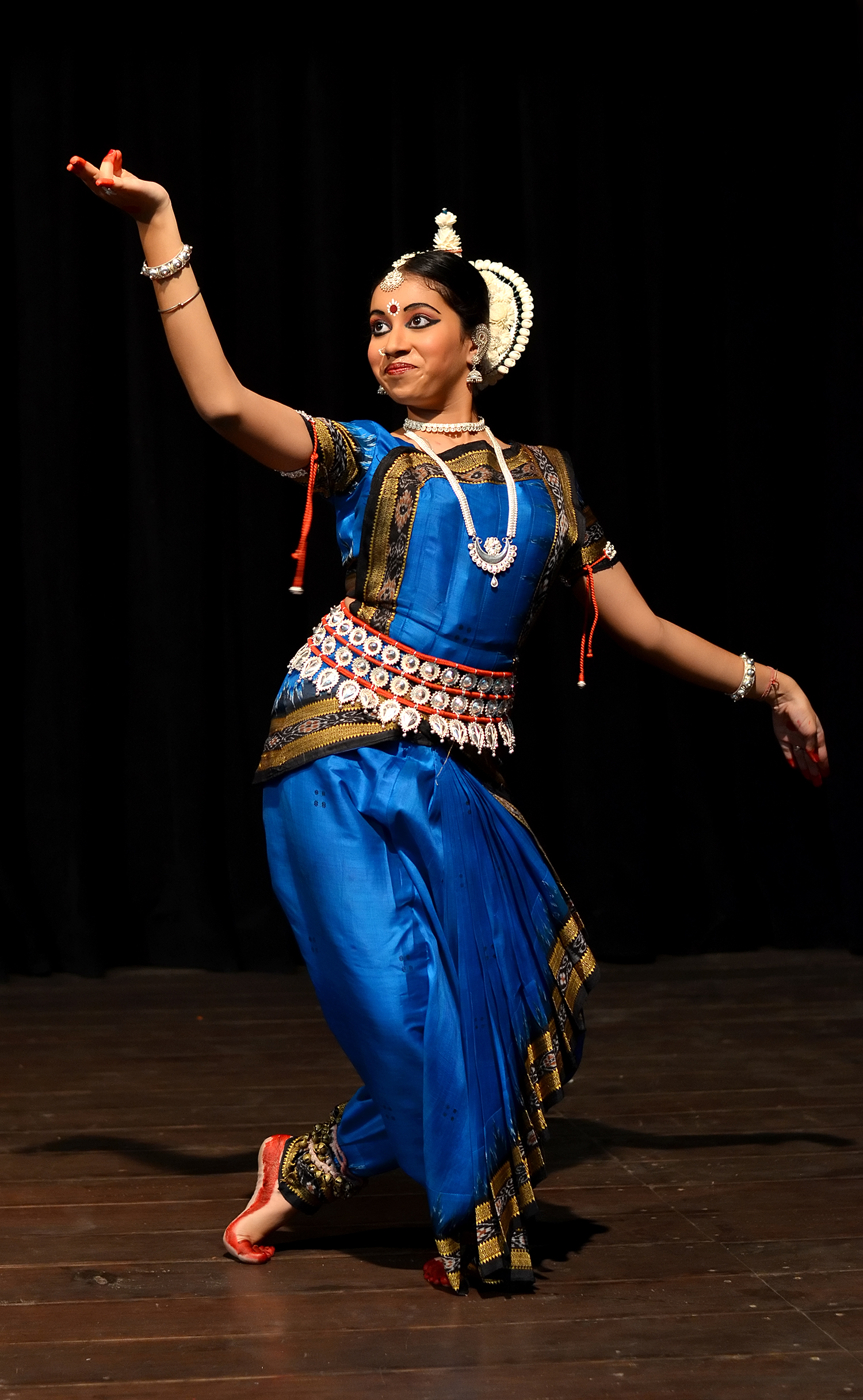
Odissi

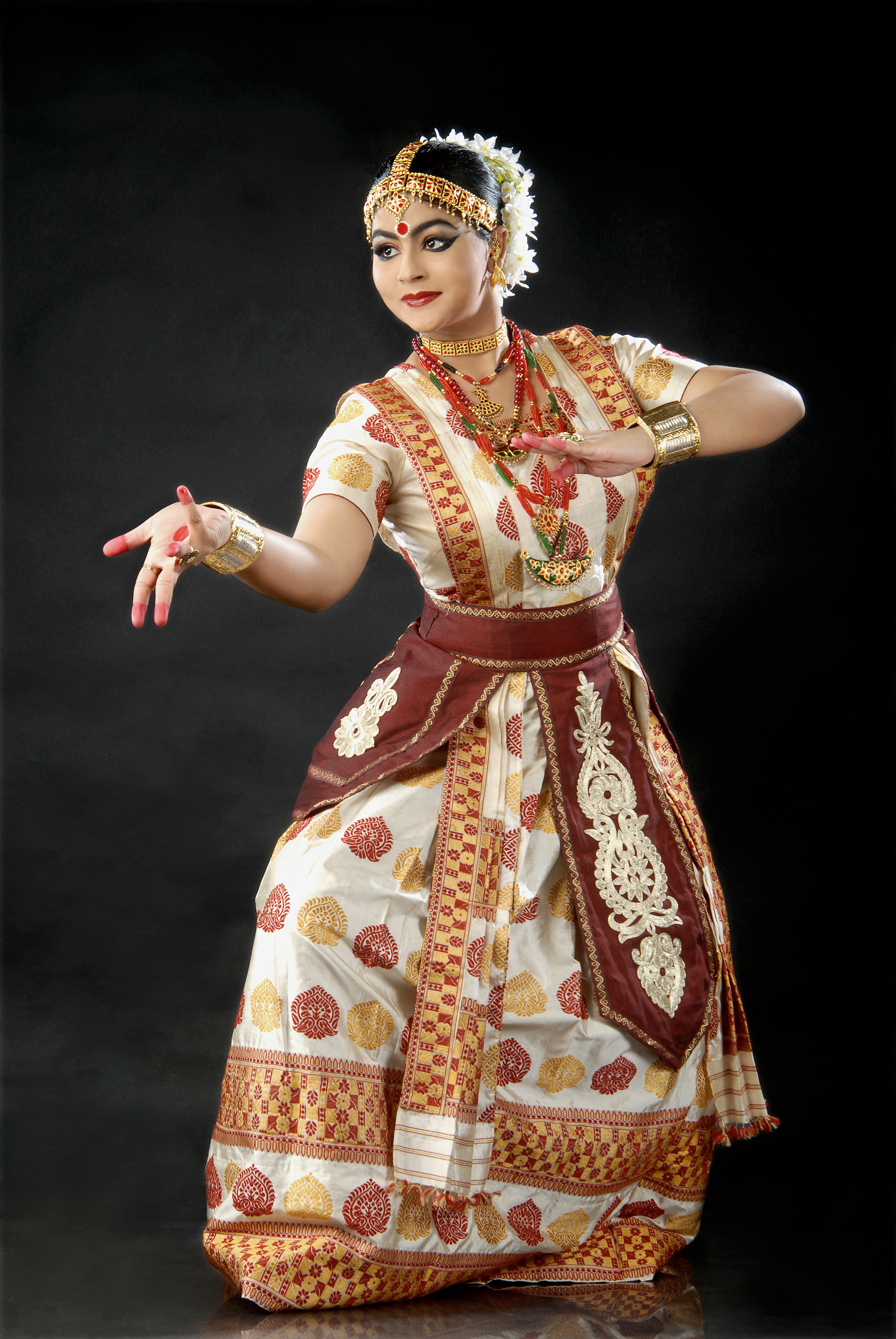
Sattriya

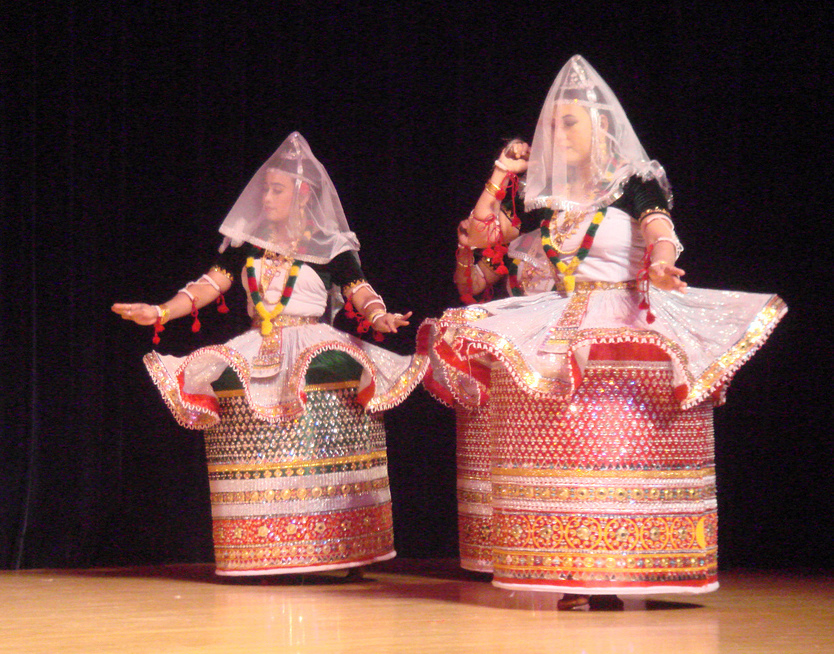
Manipuri

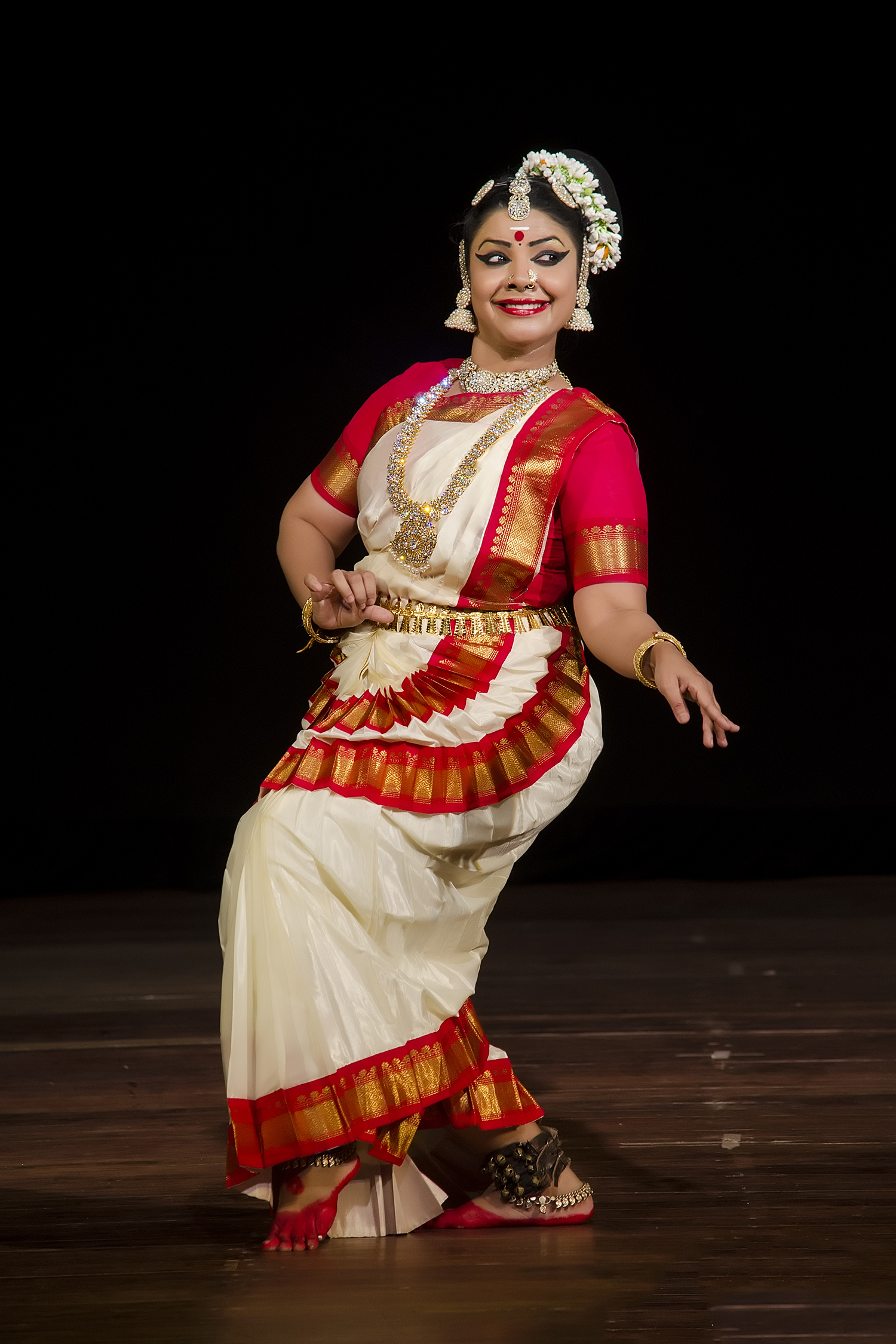
Mohiniyattam

=== Middle Ages in Europe ===
In the Middle Ages, with the spread of Christianity across Europe, the church generally frowned upon dance although there was often dancing at folk festivals, particularly at the beginning of May. In France and Italy, chain and circular dances such as the carole, and the tresque were popular from the 4th to 14th centuries. They were usually danced in a closed circle with men and women interspersed and holding hands. In Italy, the lively saltarello from Naples became popular in the 14th and 15th centuries. Groups of courtesans dressed as men performed the dance at masquerades.

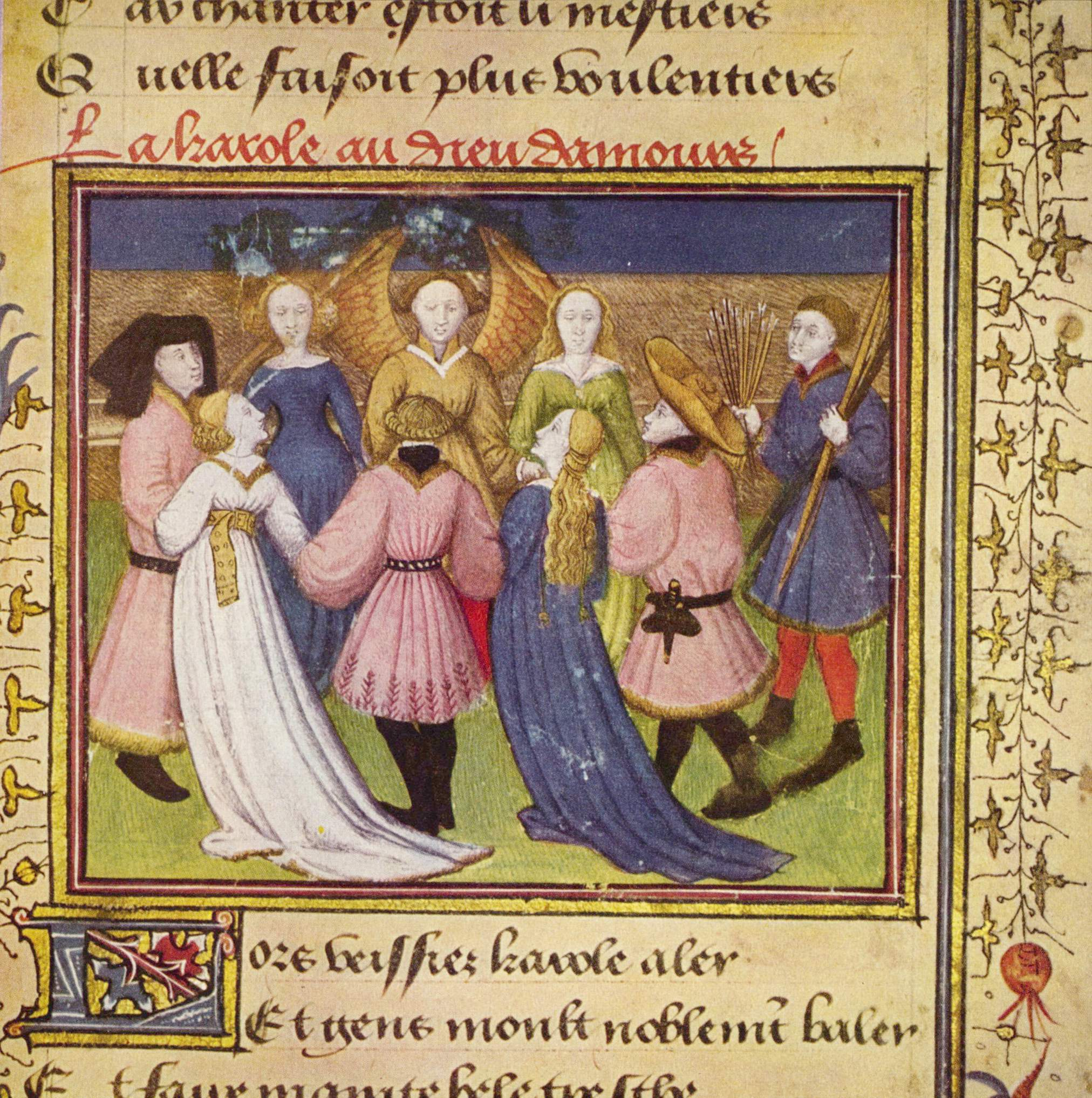
Dancing the carole (Roman de la Rose, c. 1250)

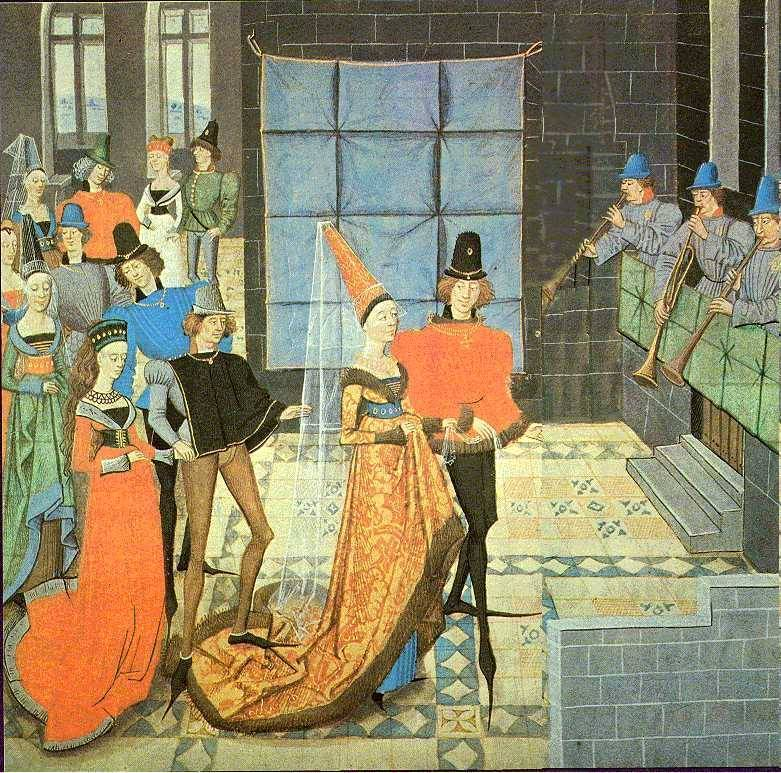
Medieval dance

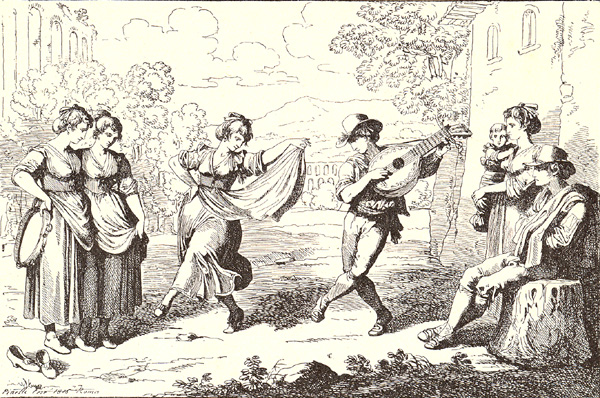
Saltarello, illustrated by Bartolomeo Pinelli

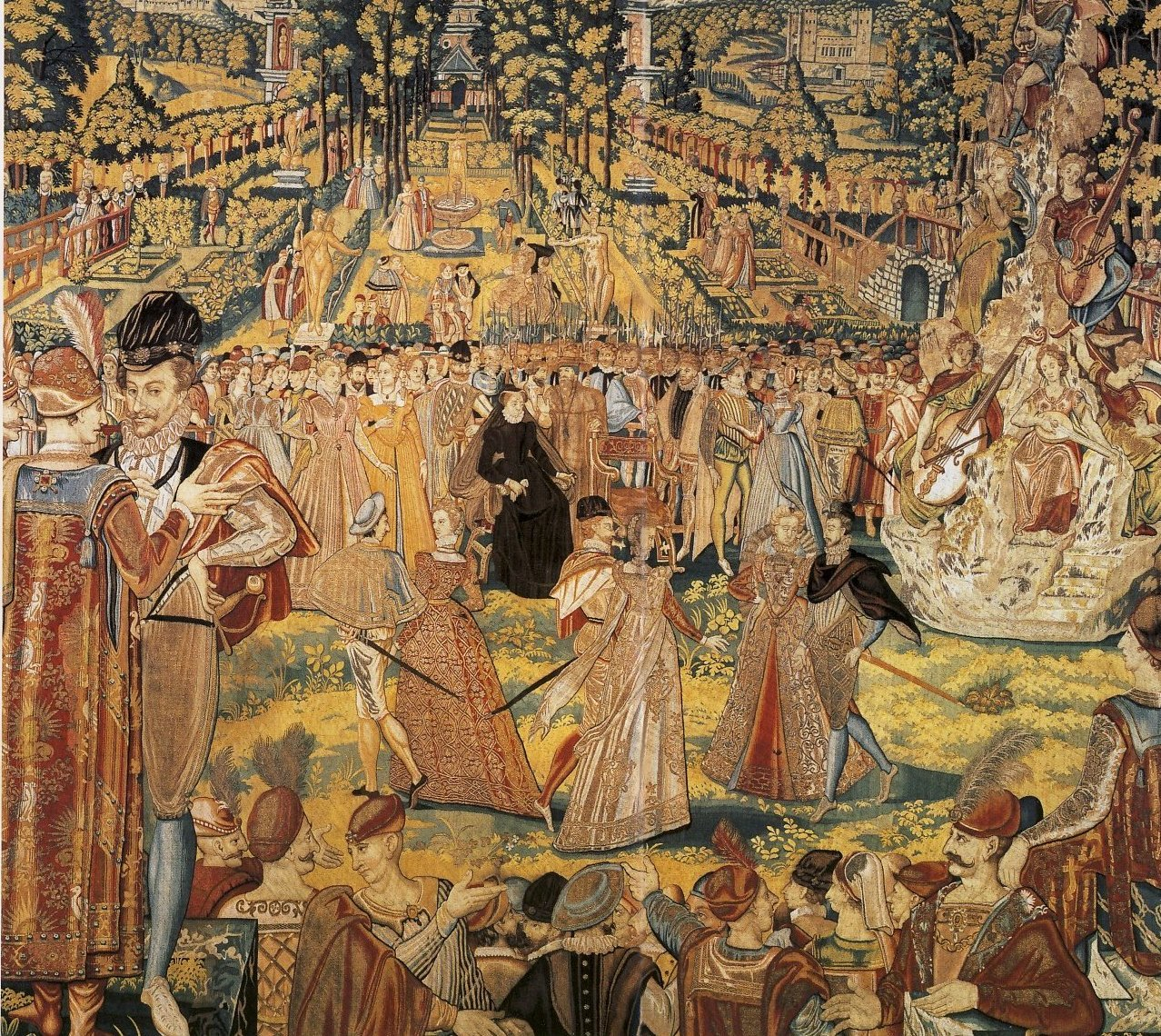
Lavish ball held by Catherine de' Medici in 1573

== Emergence of ballet ==
In the 15th century, court festivities in Italy became ever more elaborate, often featuring formal dances. One of the early masters was Domenico da Piacenza (c. 1400–1470) who compiled a manual of dance: De arte saltandi et choreas ducendi. In France, too, professional dancing began to take shape when dancers performed for Henry III of France at Fontainebleau in the early 1580s. Further presentations were made for Louis XIII, who frequently took the main part himself. But it was, above all, during the reign of Louis XIV (1643–1715) that the foundations were laid for what became known as ballet. The king not only had the rules of dance written down but established the Académie Royale de Danse in 1661, which developed into today's Paris Opera Ballet. Many of the early ballets were created by the Italian-French composer Jean Baptiste Lully and the French choreographer Pierre Beauchamp, often assisted by Molière.

Initially, female parts in the early ballets were taken by young men; but, in 1681, a young woman known as Mademoiselle De Lafontaine danced in Lully's Le Triomphe de l'amour. She went on to be the leading ballerina in at least 18 other productions at the Paris Opera between 1681 and 1693, establishing the supreme importance of women in ballet. De Lafontaine was succeeded by Marie-Thérèse de Subligny who became the first ballerina to perform in London when she appeared with Claude Ballon in 1699. Said to be the best ballerina of her day, with beautiful eyes and a fine figure, Subligny danced at the Paris Opera from 1688 until her retirement in 1707.

The next leading dancer of the Opéra was Françoise Prévost (1680–1741), whose precision, lightness and grace contributed much to classical ballet. She persuaded conductor Jean-Féry Rebel to compose suites specifically for ballet. His Caprice, Boutade, Les Caractères de la danse and La Terpsichore brought her considerable success. In particular, her personal interpretation of the steps in Caprice served as an example for other soloists while she transformed the Caractères into a sequence illustrating different types of lover, both male and female. Prévost trained two highly successful dancers, Marie Camargo (1710–1770) and Marie Sallé (1707–1756), who added their personal preferences to her Caractères, each developing individual styles. They would take her place as prima ballerinas after she retired from the opera in 1730.

Camargo proved to be a tremendous success, not only as a result of her dazzling footwork (especially her entrechat à quatre), but because she introduced slightly shorter skirts and new hair styles. She also discarded high-heeled shoes, introducing dancing slippers which facilitated the execution of the more demanding routines. By dancing demanding routines, which had previously been performed exclusively by men, Camargo further consolidated the image of the ballerina.

Sallé sought more from ballet than skillful demonstrations of technique as favoured by proponents of traditional ballet. She believed music, steps, decor and costumes should all contribute to a graceful, expressive performance combining pantomime with dance in what became known as ballet d'action. As many in the Paris Opera did not share her views, she decided to move to the more liberal London. At Covent Garden, she caused a sensation in 1734 as Galatea in Pygmalion, a ballet she had choreographed herself. Discarding the usual attire of a ballerina, she chose to wear a simple muslin tunic and allow her hair to fall freely over her shoulders. The following year, she even decided to dress as a man while performing the role of Cupid but the reviews were extremely critical. As a result, she returned to Paris where she danced at the Opéra until her retirement in 1740 at the young age of 33. Thereafter, she occasionally danced for the court at Versailles.

During the second half of the 18th century, the dominating star of the Paris Opera was Marie-Madeleine Guimard who may not have had the technique of Sallé but was nevertheless recognized for her sensuous movements, her numerous suitors and her exotic attire. Other stars included Marie Allard (1738–1802) who joined the Paris Opera in 1756 where she was trained by Gaétan Vestris, becoming not just an étoile but also his wife. Although she was rather corpulent and frequently pregnant, she was acclaimed for her impressive footwork.

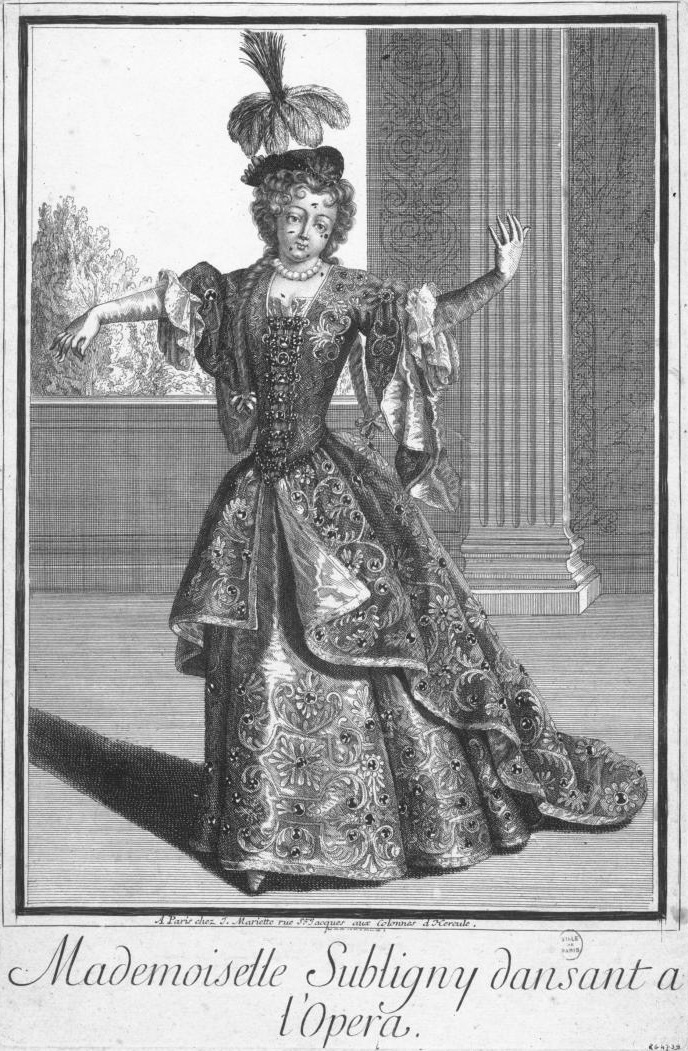
Marie-Thérèse de Subligny (c. 1700)

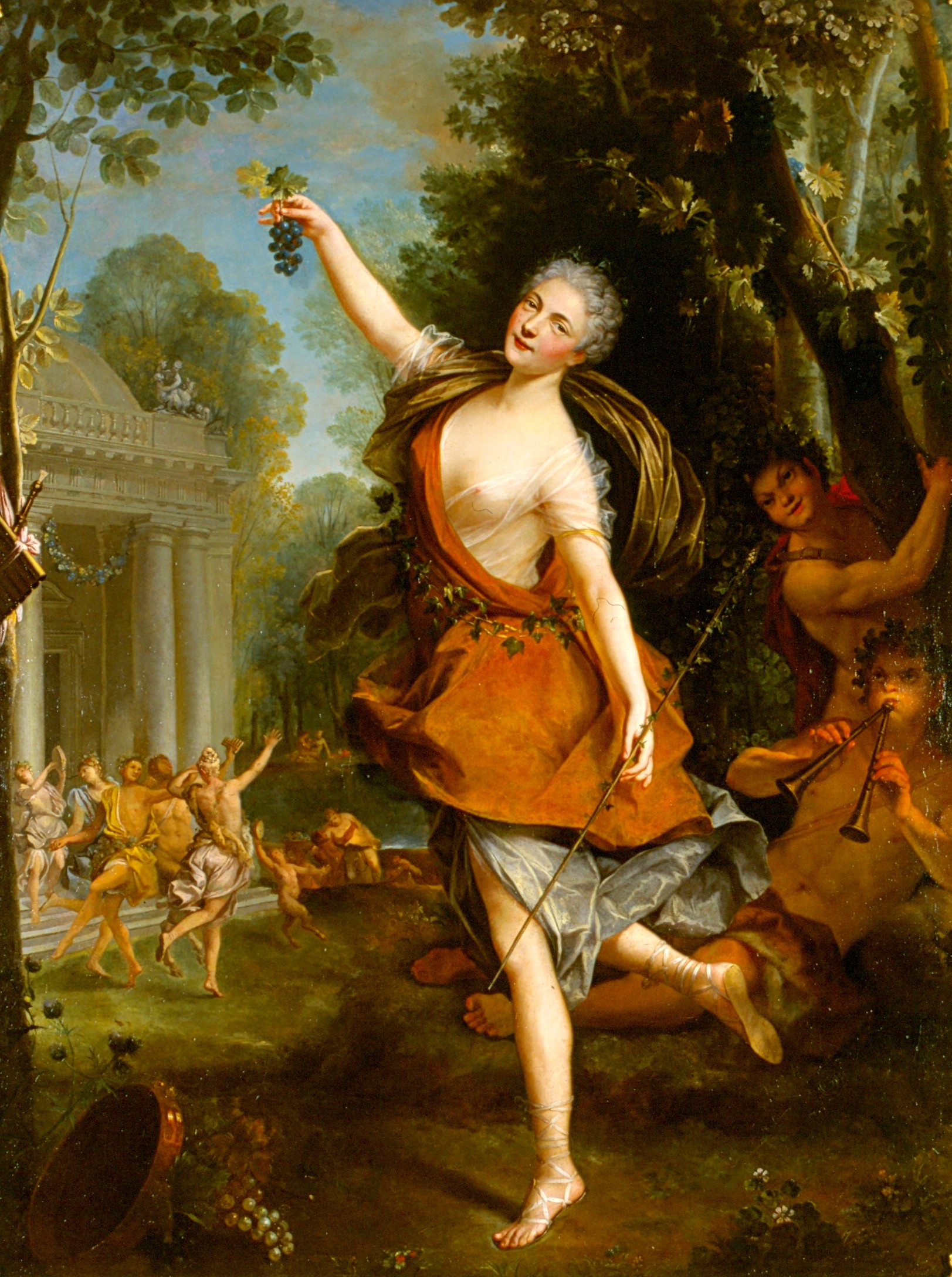
Françoise Prévost (c. 1723)

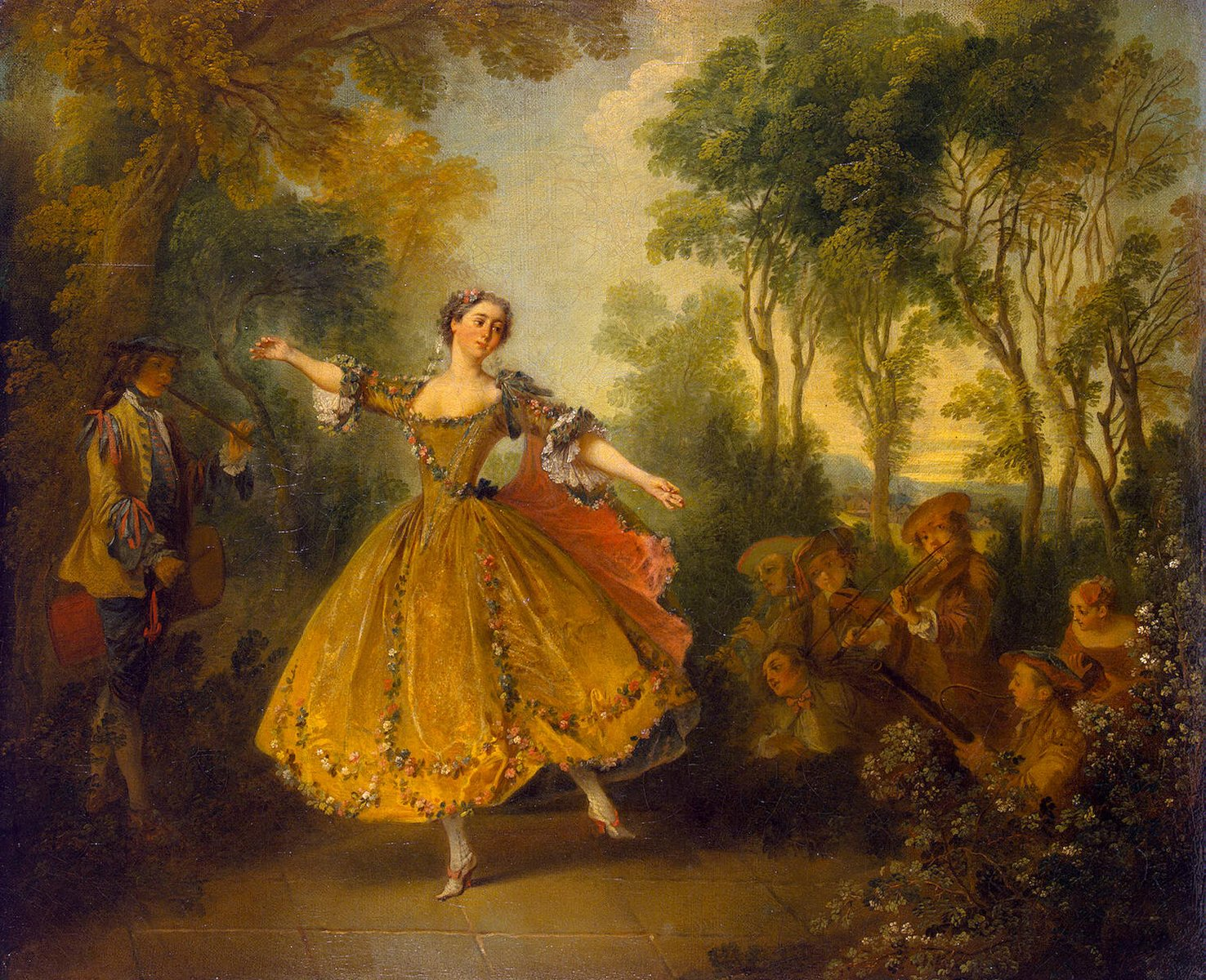
Marie Camargo painted by Nicolas Lancret (c. 1730)

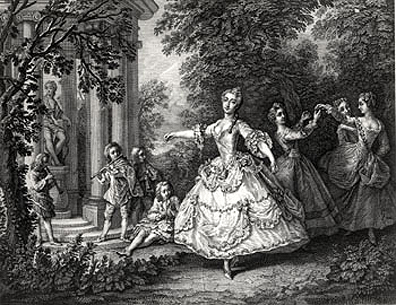
Marie Sallé (c. 1730)

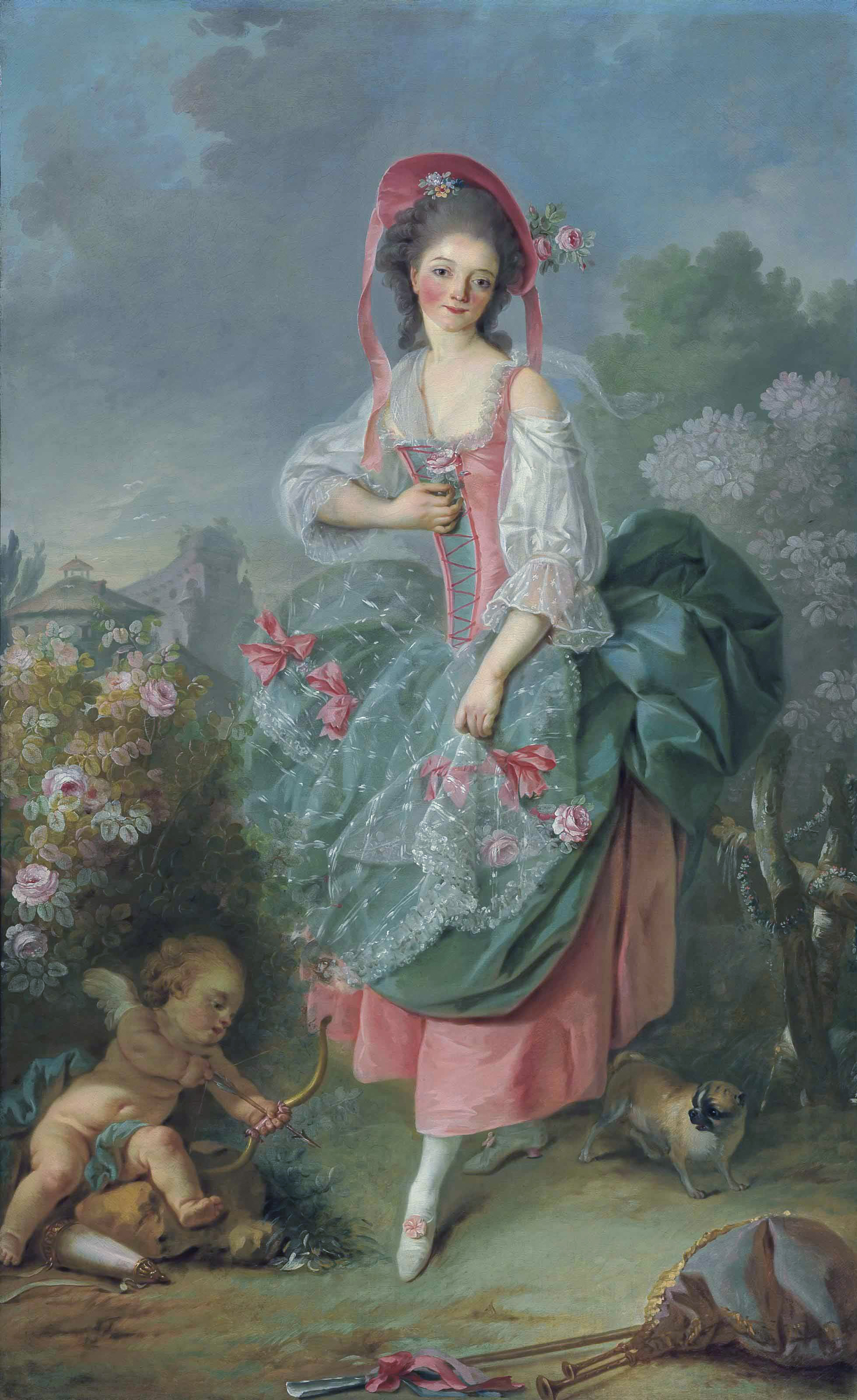
Marie-Madeleine Guimard (c. 1774)

== Romantic ballet ==
The most successful period for female ballet dancers was around the 1830s and 1840s when they became the great stars of Romantic ballet. The Italian-Swedish Marie Taglioni (1804–1884) not only excelled at the Paris Opera when she danced La Sylphide in 1832 but extended her fame to Saint Petersburg's Mariinsky Ballet as well as to the stages of Berlin, Milan and London until her retirement in 1847. It was she who developed ballet's en pointe (dancing on the tips of the toes) while introducing new fashions in dress and hair styling which became popular throughout Europe. The Austrian Fanny Elssler (1810–1884) gained fame and fortune by dancing the flirtatious Spanish cachucha in Le Diable boiteux, performing not only in Austria, Germany, France, England and Russia but also in the United States. Nevertheless, in 1845 she refused to dance with her rivals Marie Taglioni, Carlotta Grisi, Fanny Cerrito, and Lucile Grahn in Jules Perrot's Pas de Quatre.

Presented at Her Majesty's Theatre in London, the Pas de Quatre caused a sensation, bringing together the four greatest ballerinas of the day. In addition to Marie Taglioni, Italy's Grisi (1819–1899) had become famous both in Paris and Saint Petersburg for her Giselle, while Cerrito from Naples had become the star of La Scala in Milan. Grahn (1819–1907), a Dane trained by Bournonville, was based in Paris but had also danced in London, Saint Petersburg and Milan before settling in Germany.

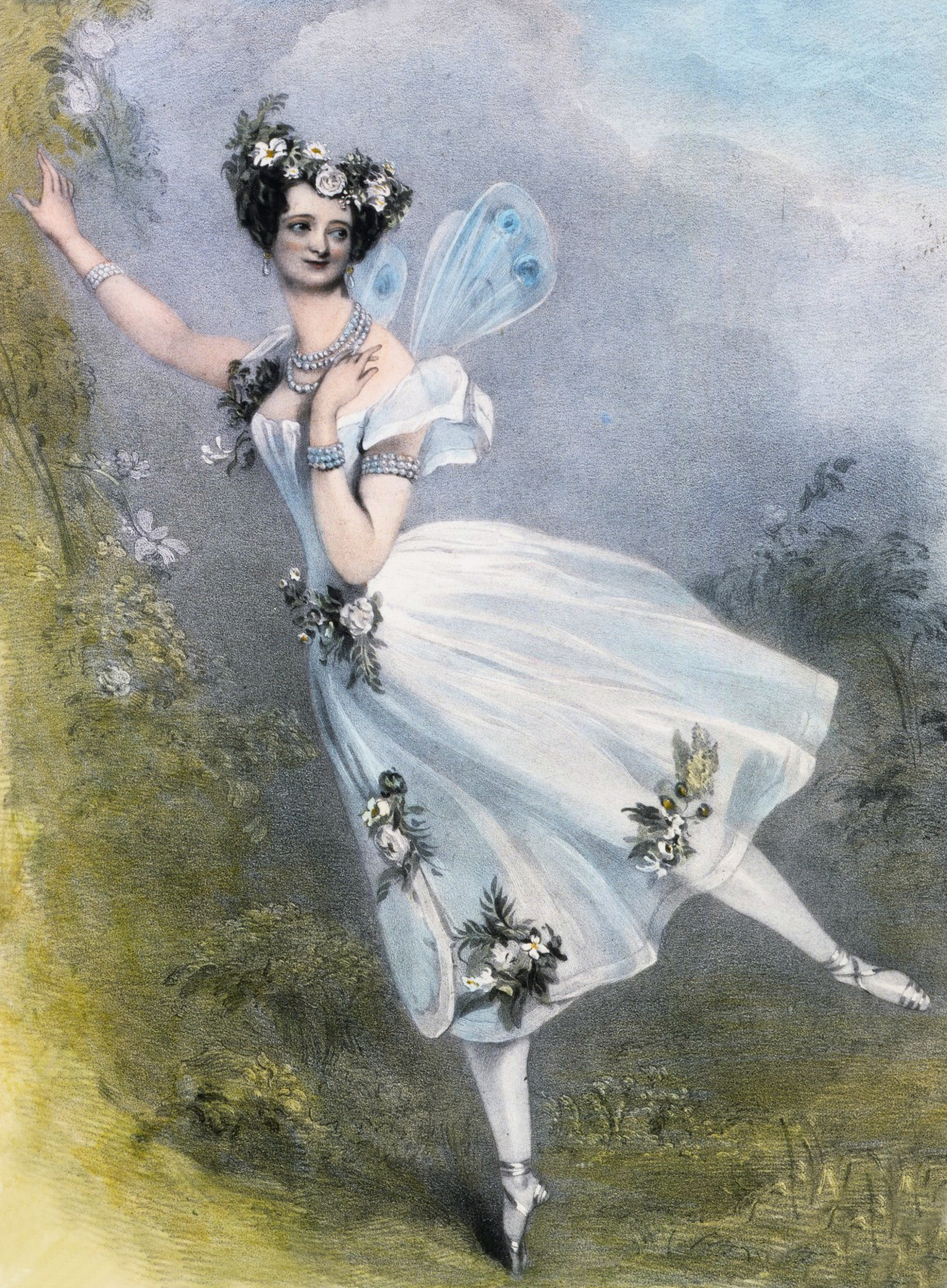
Marie Taglioni in Zephire et Flore (c. 1831)

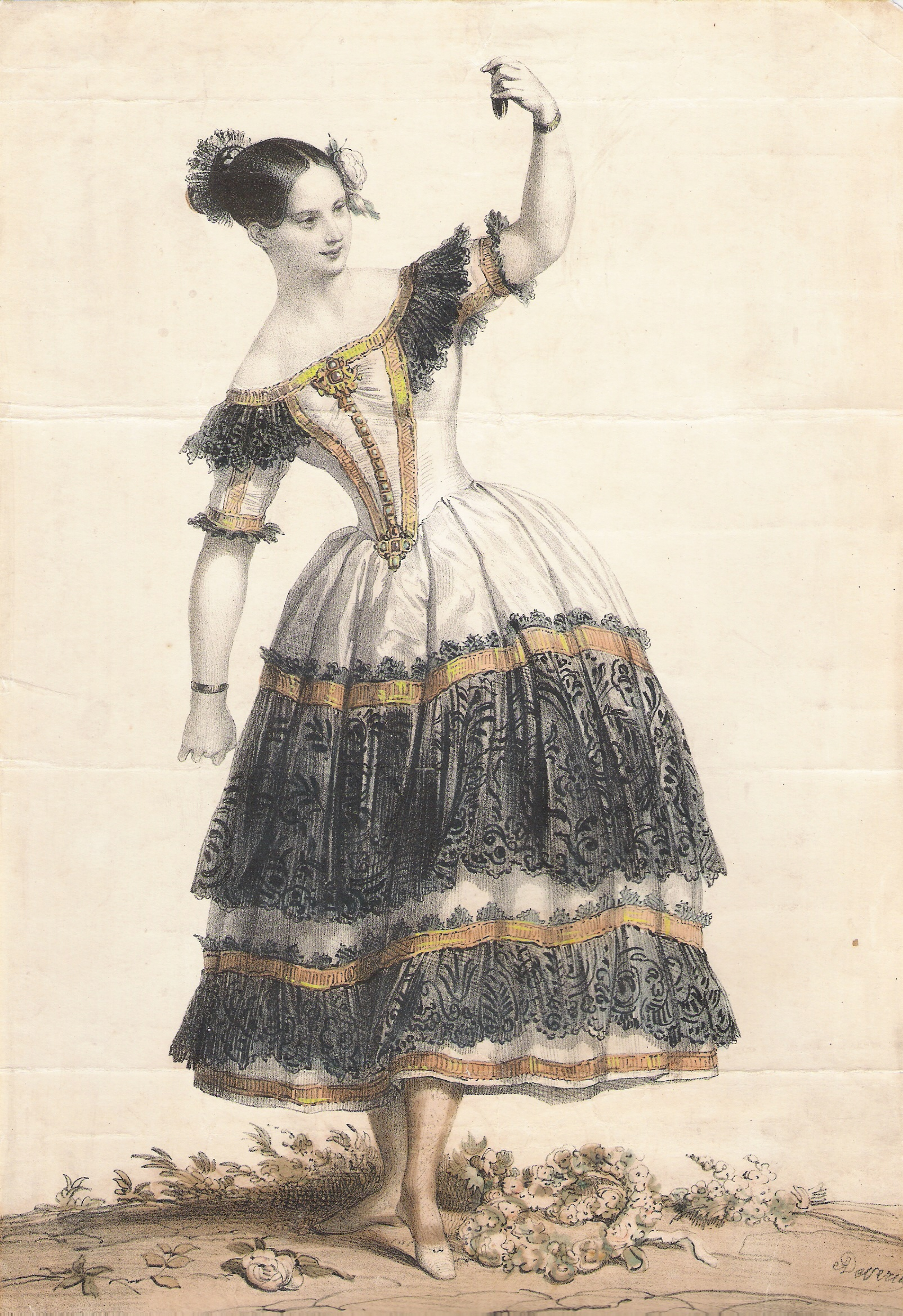
Fanny Elssler in La Cachucha (1836)

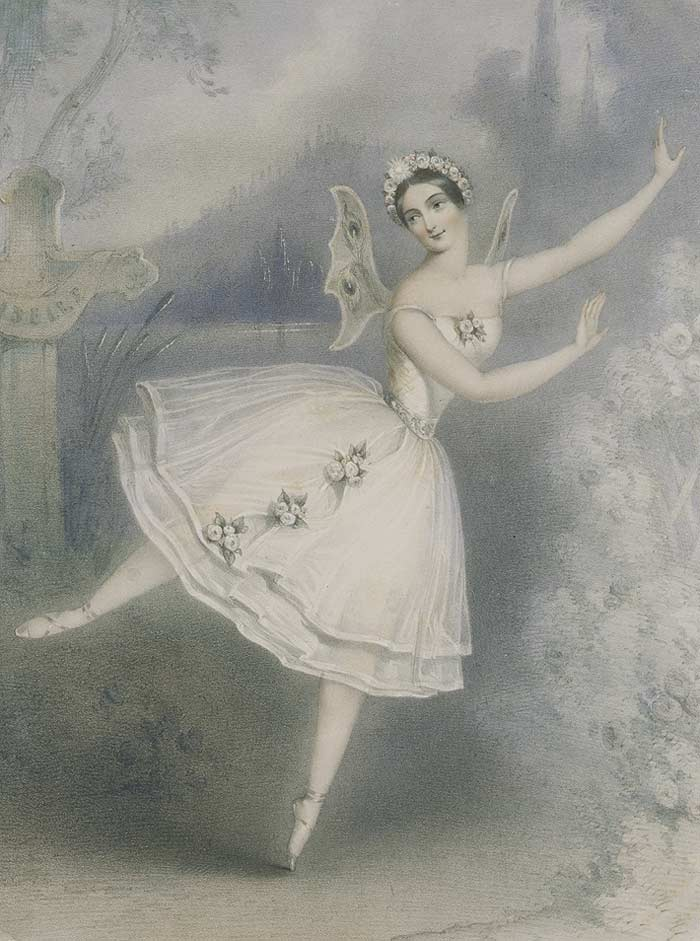
Carlotta Grisi in Giselle (1841)

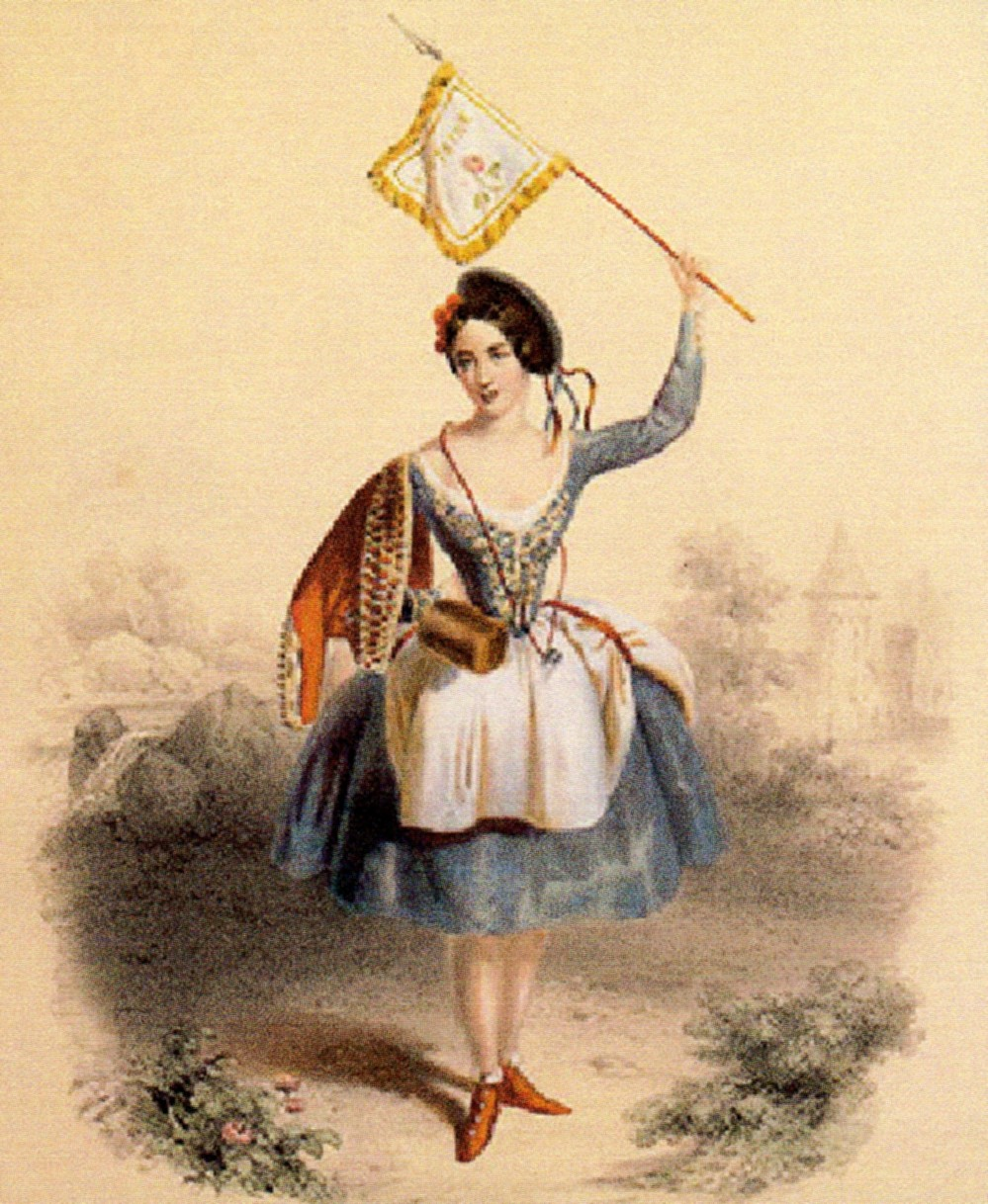
Fanny Cerrito in La Vivandière (1844)

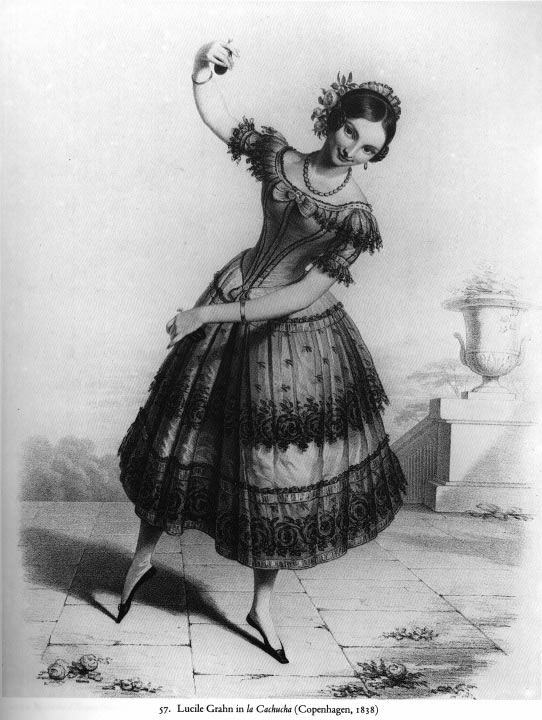
Lucile Grahn in La Cachucha (1838)

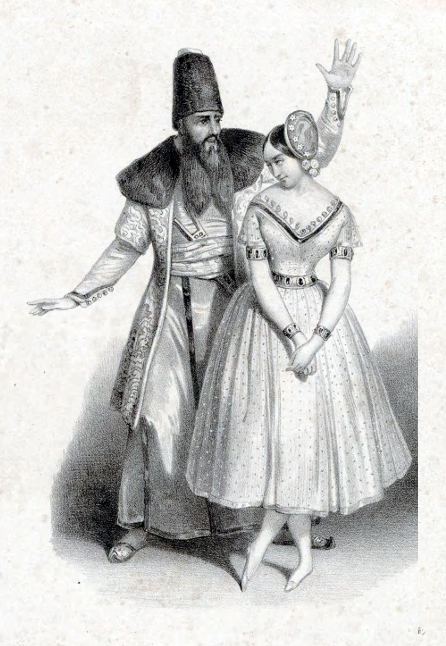
Pauline Leroux in Le Diable Amoureux (1840)

Several notable Italian ballerinas emerged in the second half of the 19th century, reaching their zeniths in Russia. Italian-born Virginia Zucchi (1849–1933) first danced in Italy and Germany but her interpretations of Marius Petipa's ballet in Russia were so successful that the Tzar insisted she should join the Mariinsky Ballet in Saint Petersburg. In the mid-1880s, she starred in Coppélia, La fille mal gardée and La Esmeralda, revolutionizing ballet in Russia through the extraordinary power of her performances. Pierina Legnani (1863–1930) from Milan followed as similar path, also dancing at the Mariinsky from 1892 where she originated famous roles in Petipa's ballets including Cinderella, Swan Lake and Raymonda, gaining the title of prima ballerina assoluta. Carlotta Brianza (1865–1938), also from Milan, first gained fame at La Scala with which she toured the United States. She is remembered above all for dancing Aurora at the premiere of Petipa's Sleeping Beauty in 1890.

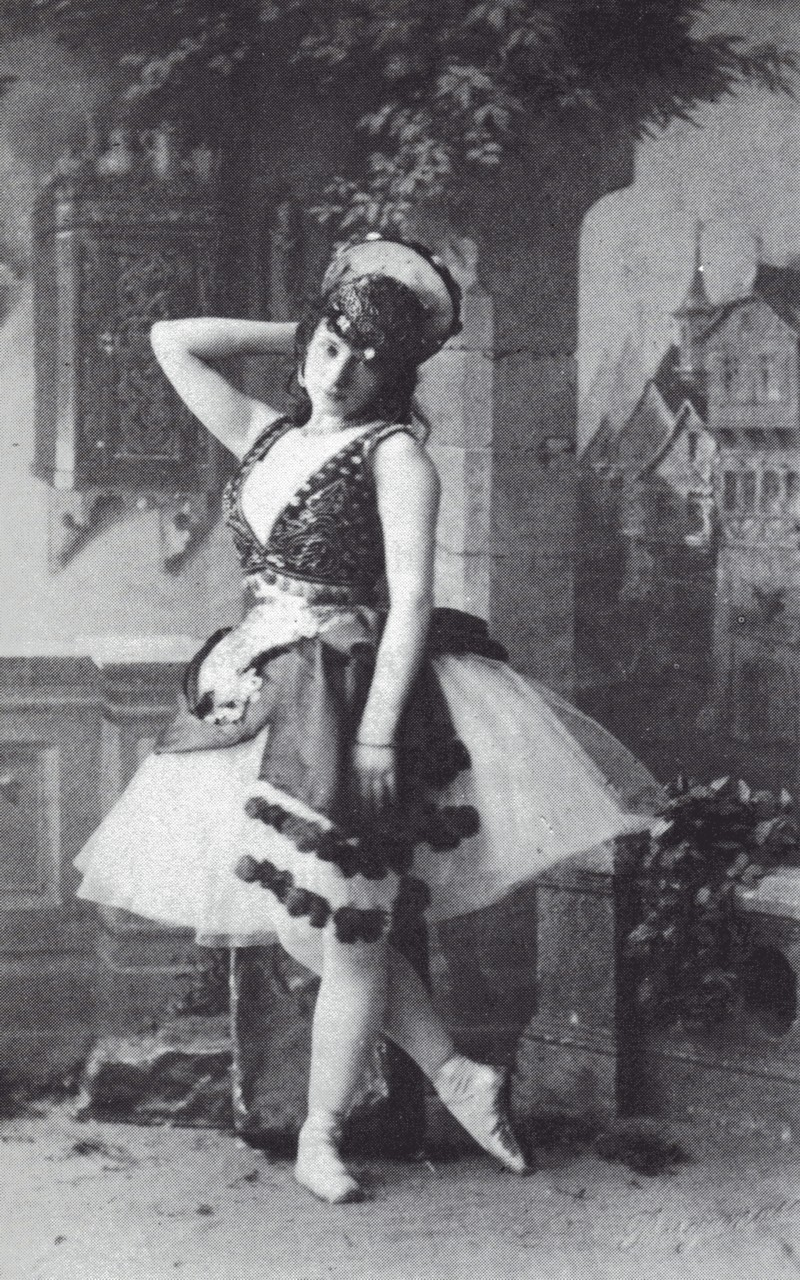
Virginia Zucchi in La Esmeralda (1886)

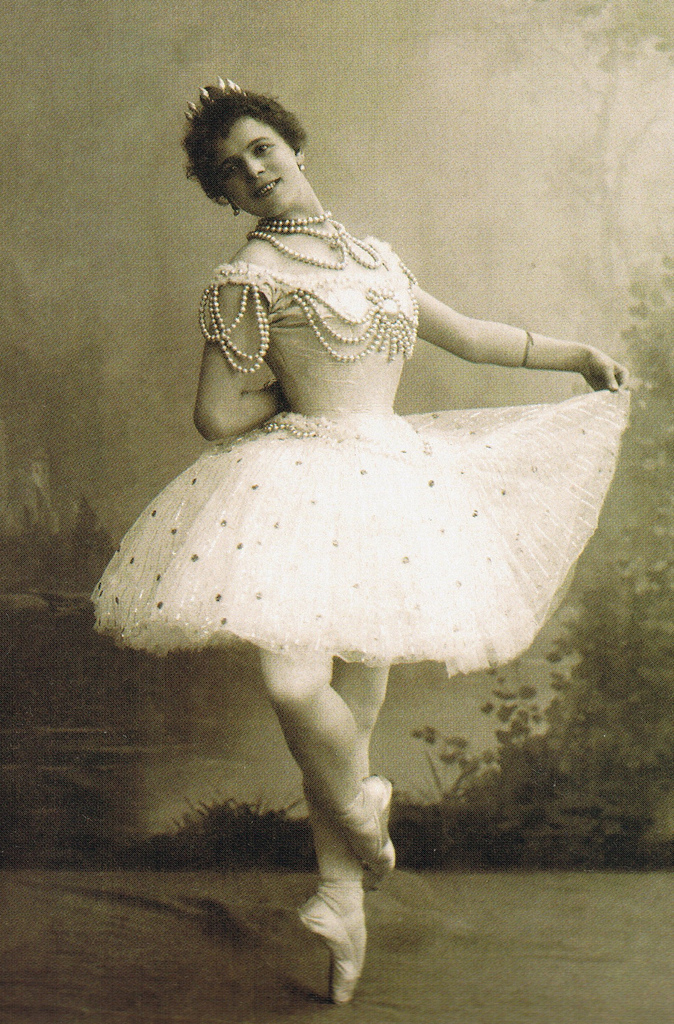
Pierina Legnani in La Perle (1896)

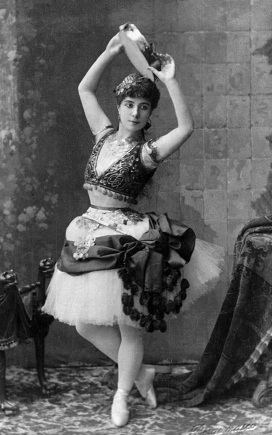
Carlotta Brianza in La Esmeralda (c. 1890)

== 20th-century ballet ==
New, more dynamic approaches to ballet developed from the beginning of the 20th century, the most influential being Sergei Diaghilev's Ballets Russes, promoting innovative collaborations between choreographers, composers and dancers. One of the early stars was Anna Pavlova (1881–1931) who gained fame by dancing The Dying Swan choreographed by Mikhail Fokine before joining the Ballets Russes in 1909. Her rival, Tamara Karsavina (1885–1978), who also performed with the Ballets Russes, is remembered above all for creating the title role in Fokine's The Firebird. Olga Spessivtseva (1895–1991) danced with the Mariinsky in Saint Petersburg but also toured with the Ballets Russes, dancing Aurora in Diaghilev's The Sleeping Princess (1921) in London.

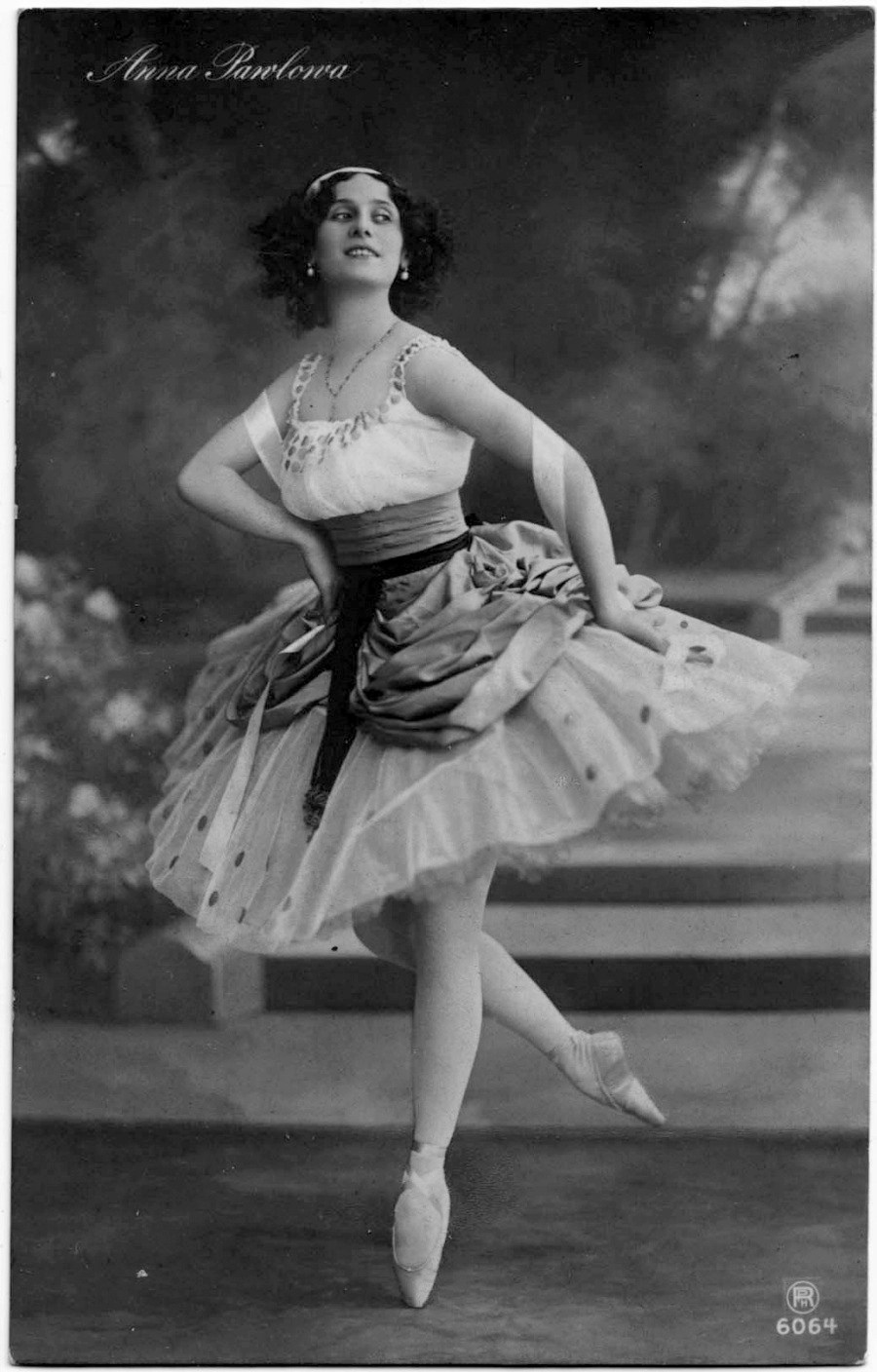
Anna Pavlova (1912)

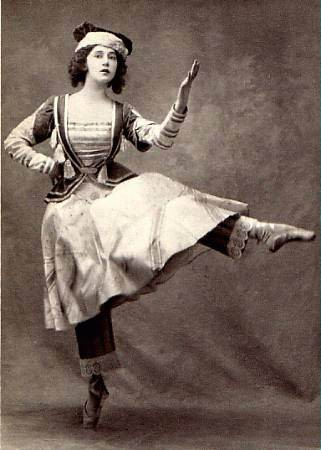
Tamara Karsavina (1911)

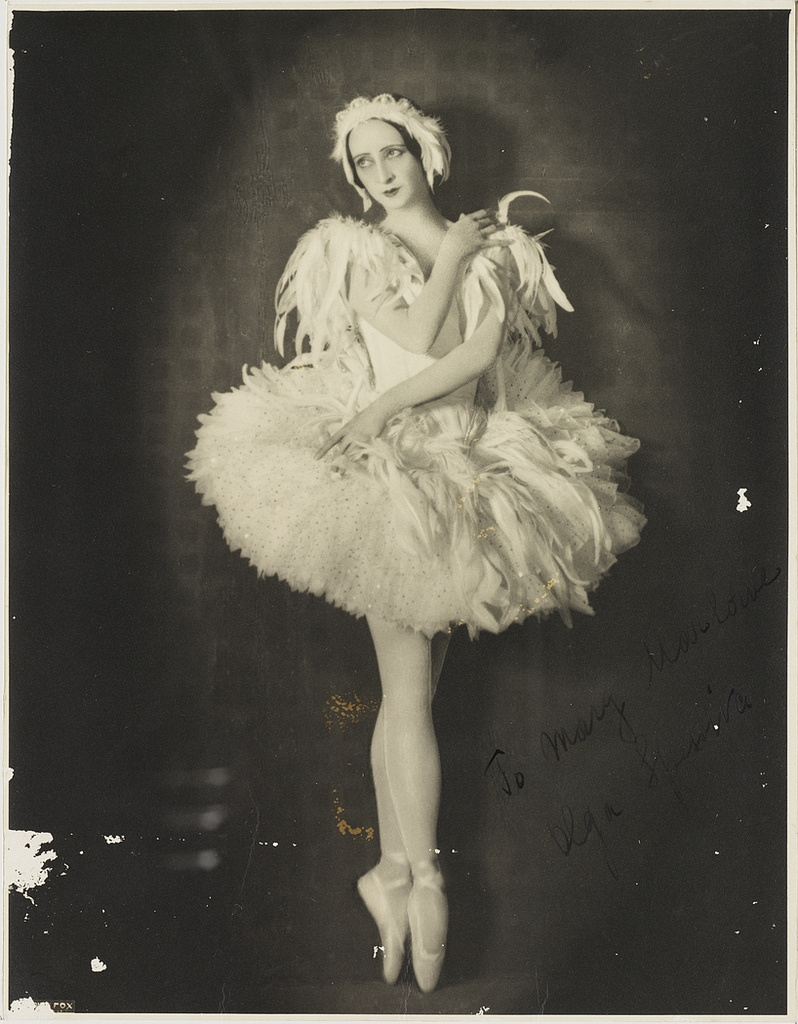
Olga Spessivtseva (1934)

Ballet also began to develop in London, thanks mainly to the efforts of two women. Polish-born Marie Rambert (1888–1982) who had also gained experience with the Ballets Russes founded the Ballet Club (later the Rambert Dance Company) in 1926 introducing new choreographers such as Frederick Ashton. Even more influential, Ninette de Valois (1898–2001) spent three years with the Ballets Russes before creating London's Vic-Wells Ballet in 1931 (later becoming the Royal Ballet) where Alicia Markova (1910–2004) was the first prima ballerina, starring in ballets from the Mariinsky's classical productions. Markova left to form her own touring company in 1937. Ten years later Margot Fonteyn (1919–1991) became the company's prima ballerina. The height of her fame came in 1961 when she embarked on a partnership with Rudolf Nureyev, first in Giselle, until she retired in 1979.

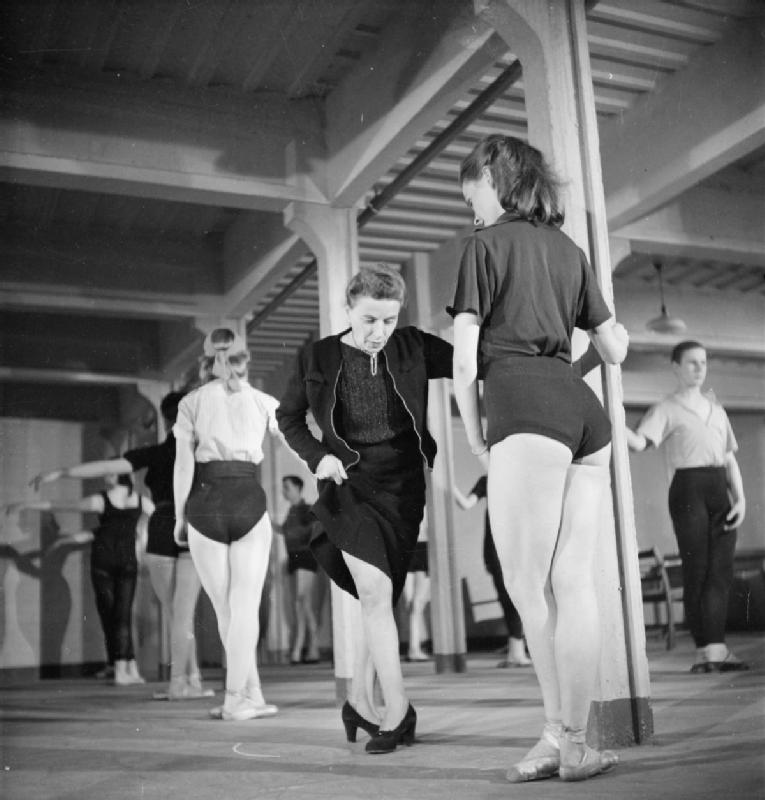
Marie Rambert, centre (1943)

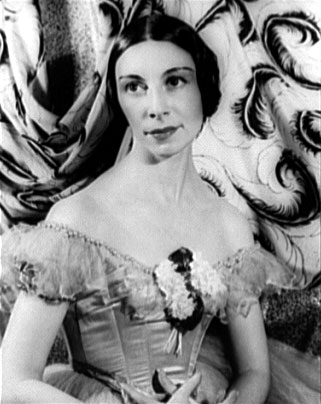
Alicia Markova (1940)

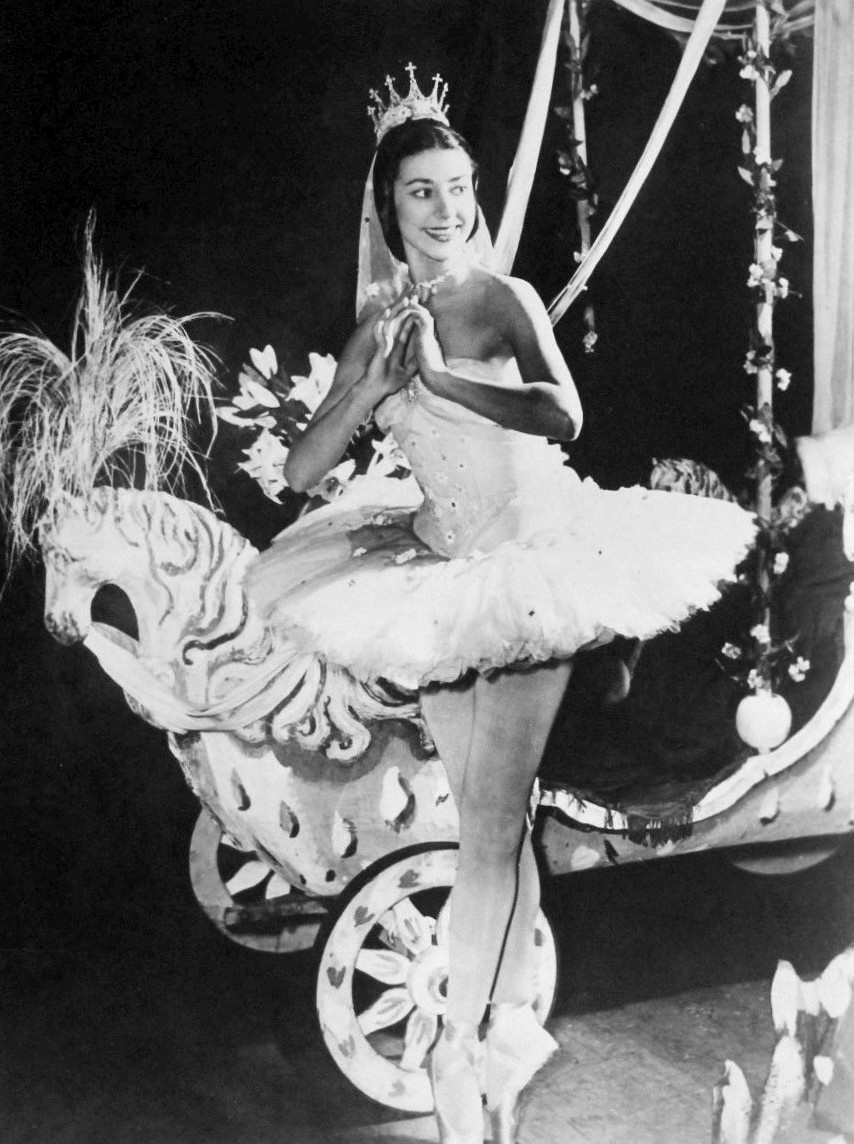
Margot Fonteyn (1957)

As ballet developed in the United States, Maria Tallchief (1925–2013), the first major American prima ballerina, was promoted by the choreographer Bronislava Nijinska (1891–1972) when she joined the Ballet Russe de Monte Carlo in New York in 1942. She danced as a soloist in George Balanchine's arrangements for Song of Norway in 1944. As Balanchine's wife, she soon became the star of the New York City Ballet. Lucia Chase (1897–1986) was a co-founder of the American Ballet Theatre in 1939 and became its artistic director for over 40 years, overseeing the production of a wide variety of new ballets. Several outstanding American ballerinas have emerged over the years including Gelsey Kirkland (born 1952), who performed the leading role in The Firebird when she was just 17, and Suzanne Farrell (born 1945) who was the star of Balanchine's Don Quixote in 1965.

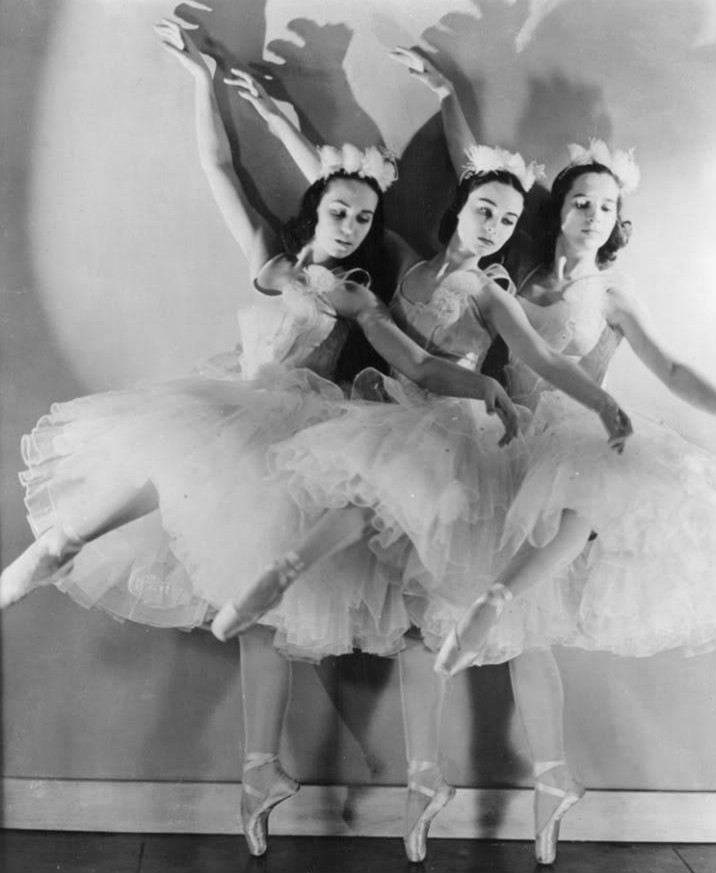
Ballet Russe de Monte Carlo, Nutcracker (1940)

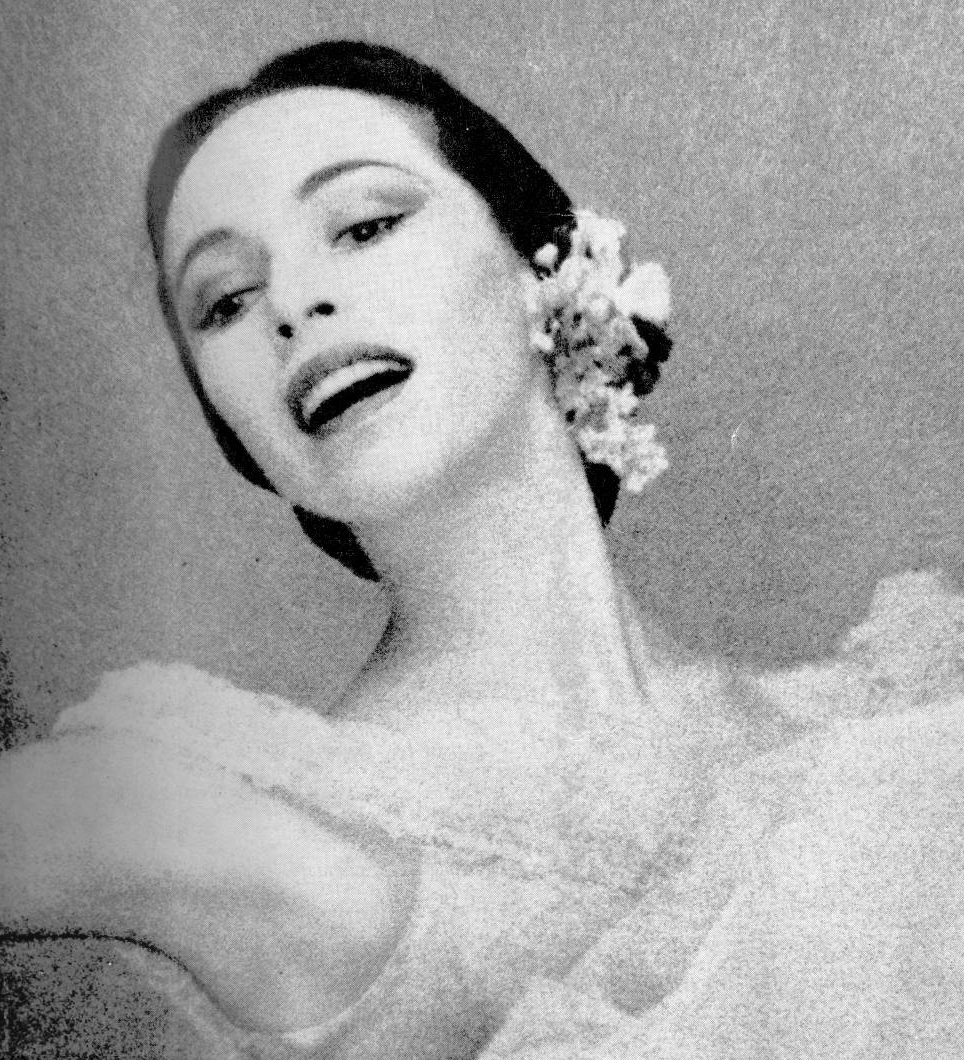
Maria Tallchief (1954)

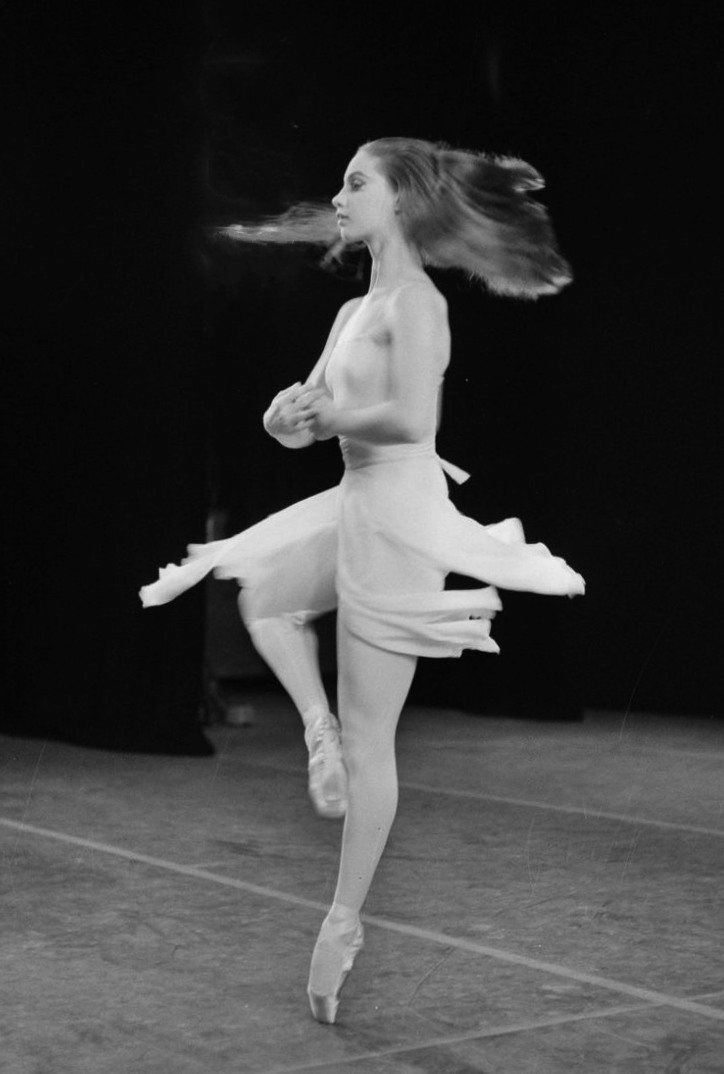
Suzanne Farrell (1965)

== Other forms of dance ==
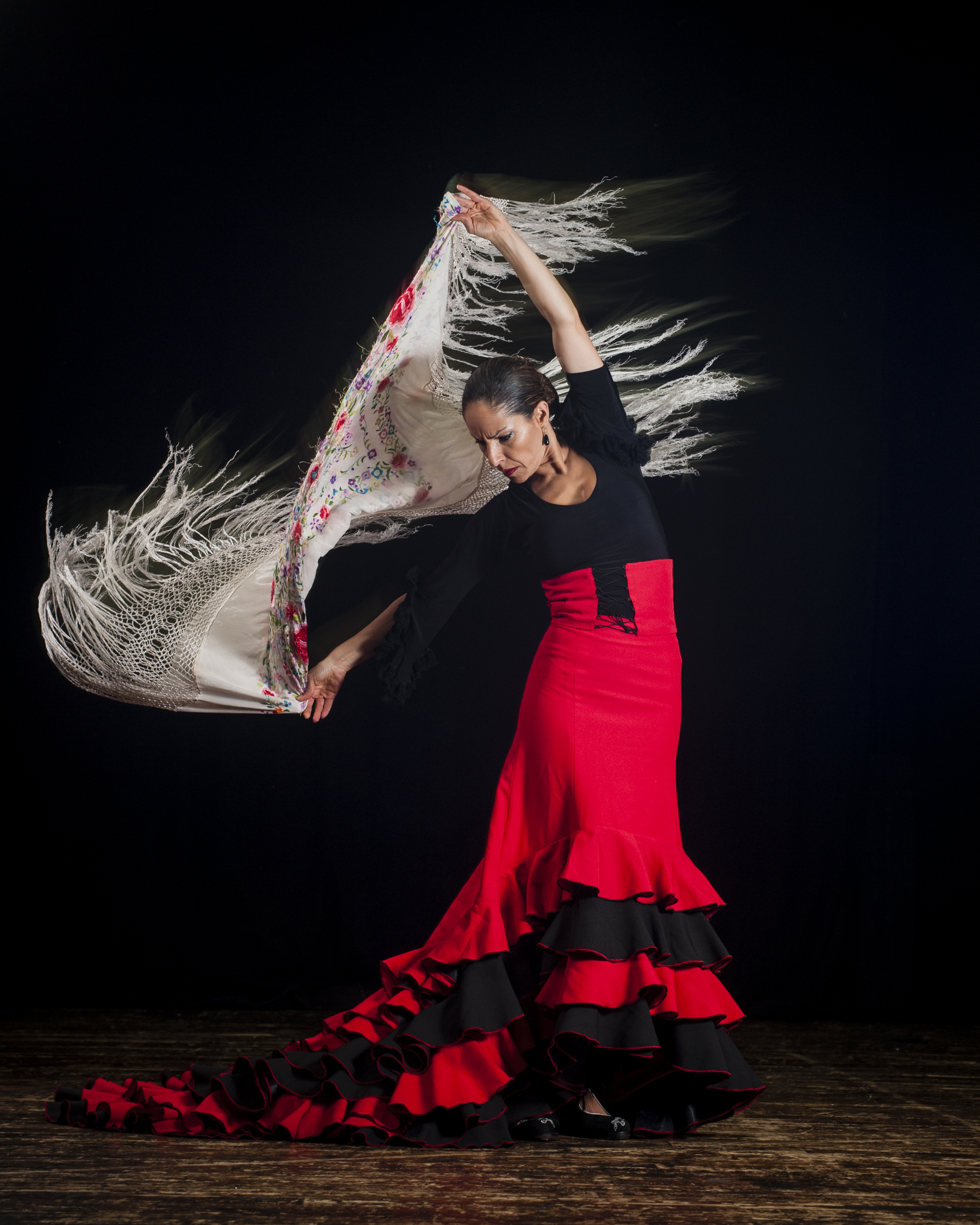
Flamenco dancer

Women have also contributed significantly to most other forms of dance, in particular flamenco, modern dance, expressionist dance, belly dance and cabaret which led to musical theatre.

=== Flamenco ===
Flamenco music originated in the south of Spain in the 15th century, probably resulting from the influence of the Moors with possible origins in India. While many of the singers who emerged in the 18th century were men, women increasingly gained fame as dancers. One of the earliest was Juana la Macarrona (1860–1947) who first performed in Seville with singer Silverio Franconetti but soon become popular not only throughout Spain but across Europe. Lola Flores (1923–1995) is remembered for singing and dancing Andalusian folklore, especially flamenco, copla and chotis. Angelita Vargas (born 1946) is considered to be one of the greatest stars of Andalusian flamenco dancing, touring Europe, the United States, Japan and Australia.

=== Modern dance in the United States ===
Led by women, various styles of modern dance began to develop towards the end of the 19th century. Loie Fuller (1862–1928) from Chicago was one of the pioneers. She employed her own natural approach to movement and improvisation, later becoming a star at the Folies Bergère in Paris. Inspired by Greek art, Isadora Duncan (1877–1927) from San Francisco paved the way to the modern free dance style believing it was more important to express the essence of life through movement rather than to follow the precepts of classical ballet. Raised on a farm in New Jersey, Ruth St. Denis (1879–1968) developed her own interpretations of Oriental dance as an expression of spiritualism. The American Martha Graham (1894–1991) exerted considerable influence on the development of modern dance through her New York-based Martha Graham Center of Contemporary Dance. Other female figures who contributed to developments in the mid-20th century include Doris Humphrey (1895–1958) who choreographed Afro-American spirituals and Helen Tamiris (1905–1966) who played an important part in choreographing early musicals. Another major choreographer of Broadway musicals was German-born Hanya Holm (1893–1992), a student of Mary Wigman.

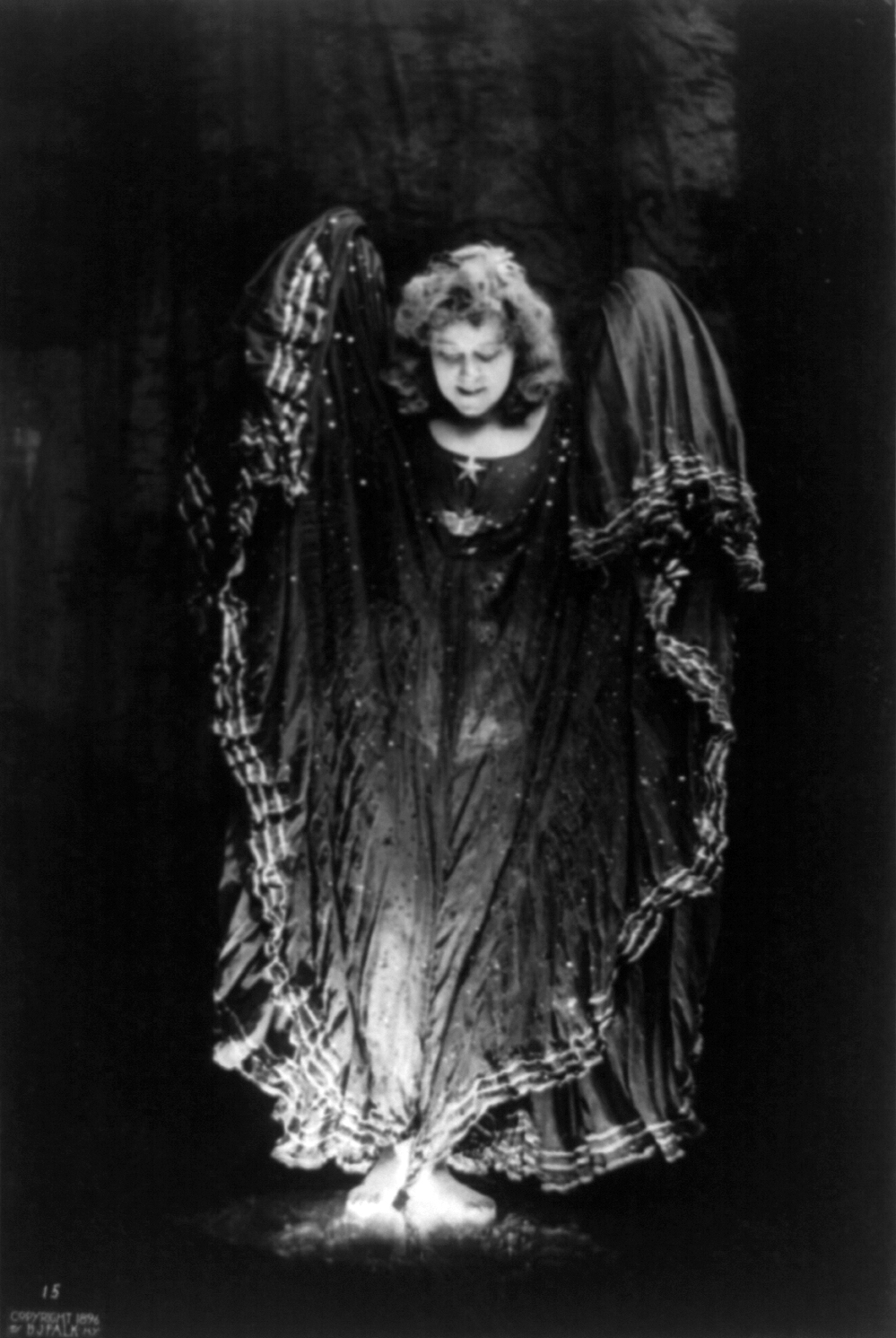
Loie Fuller (1896)

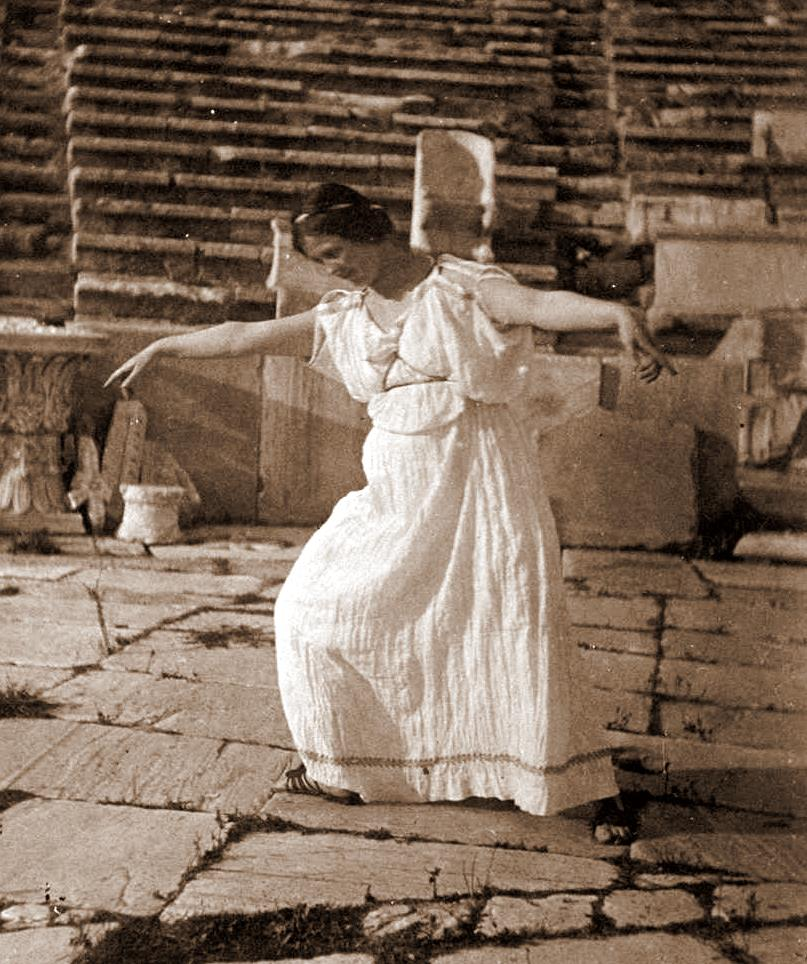
Isadora Duncan (1903)

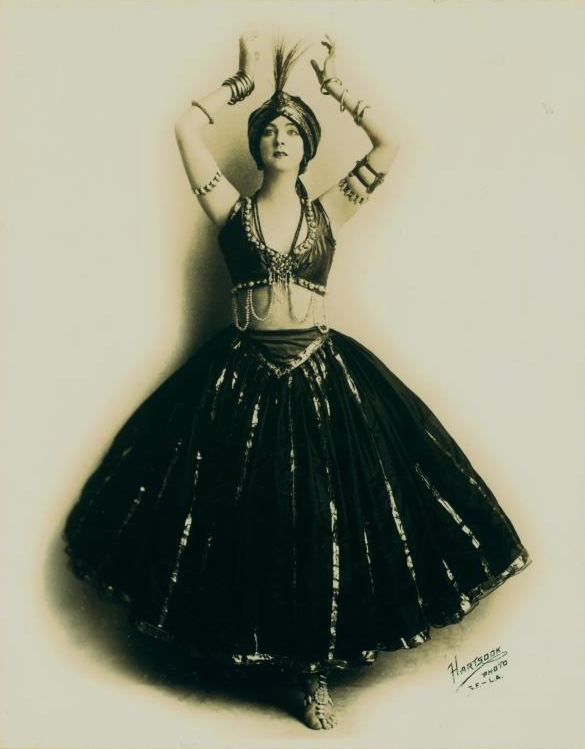
Ruth St. Denis (1916)

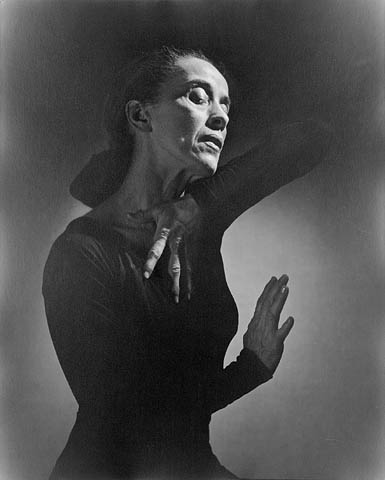
Martha Graham (1948)

=== Expressionist dance ===
The German Mary Wigman is credited as the creator of expressionist dance. Inspired by Oriental percussion, she often stressed the macabre. Hertha Feist (1896–1990), also from Germany, was an expressionist dancer and choreographer. She established her own school in Berlin, combining gymnastics with nudism and dance although her ambitions were later seriously curtailed by the Nazis. Also an associate of Wigman, Gret Palucca (1902–1993) opened her own schools in Germany in the 1920s and 1930s but they were later closed because of her Jewish ancestry. One of her students, Dore Hoyer (1911–1967), who was also an associate of Mary Wigman, developed her own programmes before the Second World War in Germany, the Netherlands, Denmark and Sweden. After the war she became ballet director at the Hamburg State Opera.

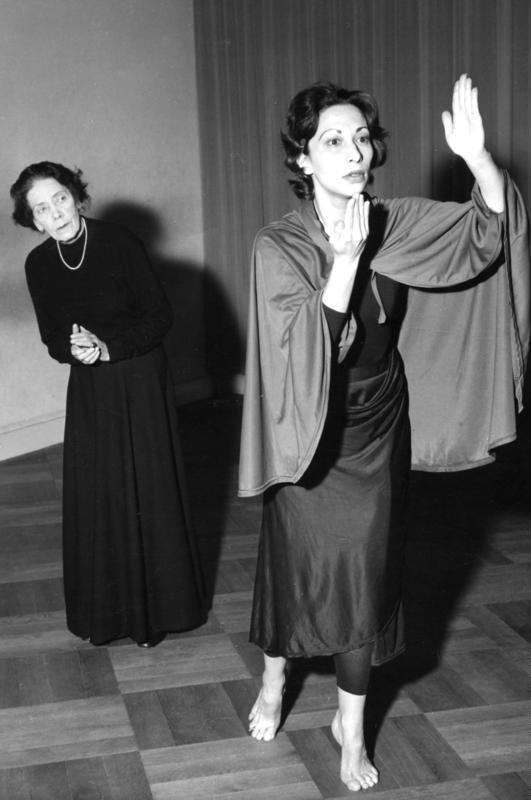
Mary Wigman (1959)

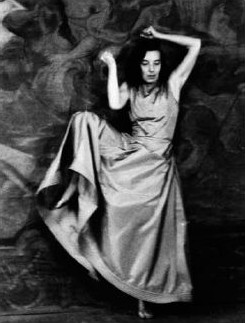
Gret Palucca (1930s)

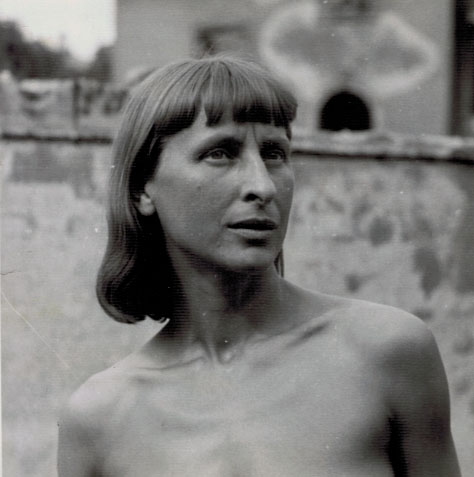
Dore Hoyer

=== Belly dance ===
While belly dancing appears to have its origins in the distant past, it was introduced to Europe and North America towards the end of the 19th century. Several of Egypt's film actresses performed belly dancing in the musicals of the 1930s and 1940s. Early stars included Tahia Carioca (1919–1999), Samia Gamal (1924–1994) and Nelly Mazloum (1929–2003). From the 1960s, belly dance became increasingly popular across the United States with stars including Dalilah (1936–2001), Zouba El-Klobatiyya (1917-1972), Dahlena and Serena (1933–2007).

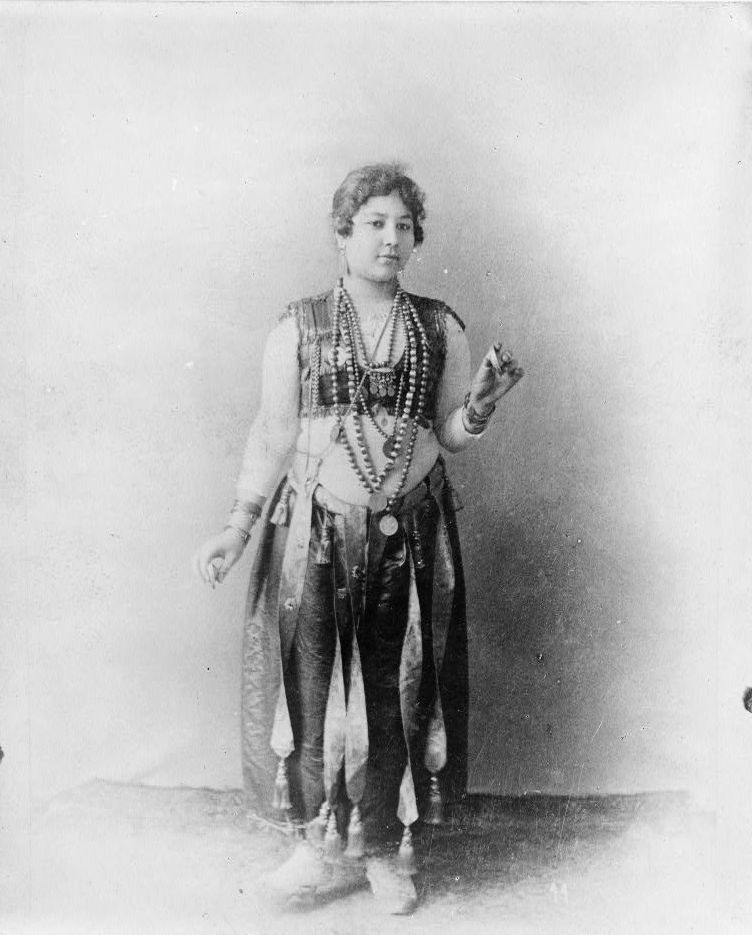
Egyptian belly dancer, Chicago World Fair (1893)

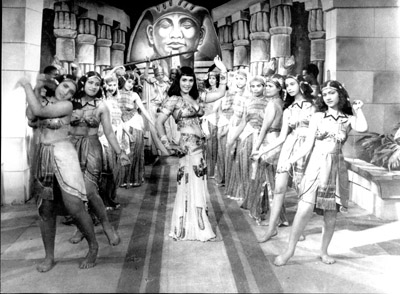
Tahia Carioca (1920)

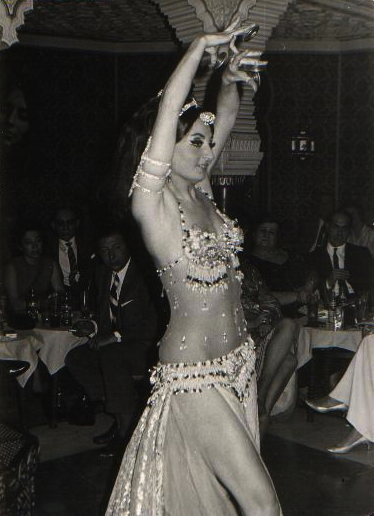
Dalilah (1963)

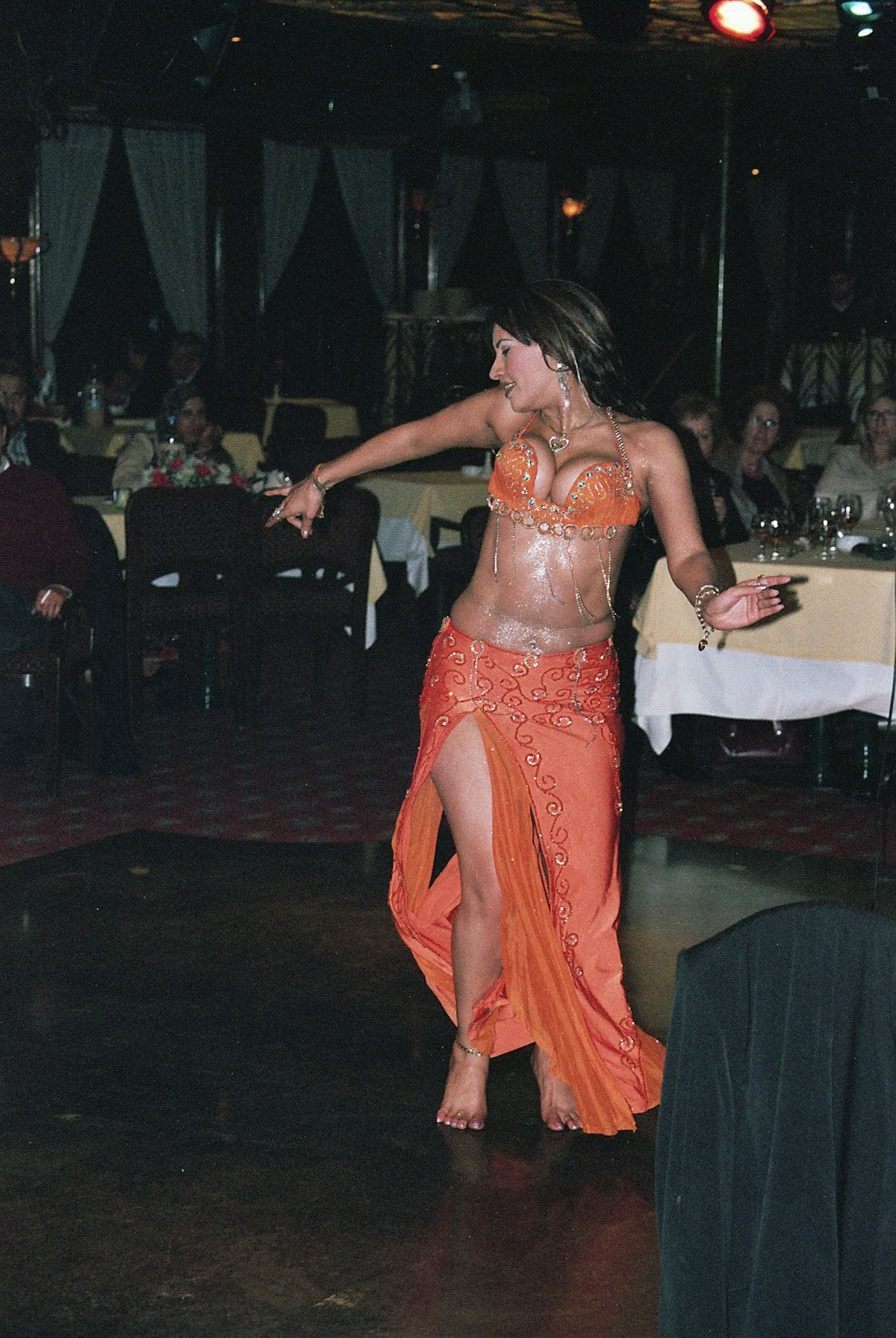
Randa Kamel, Cairo (2007)

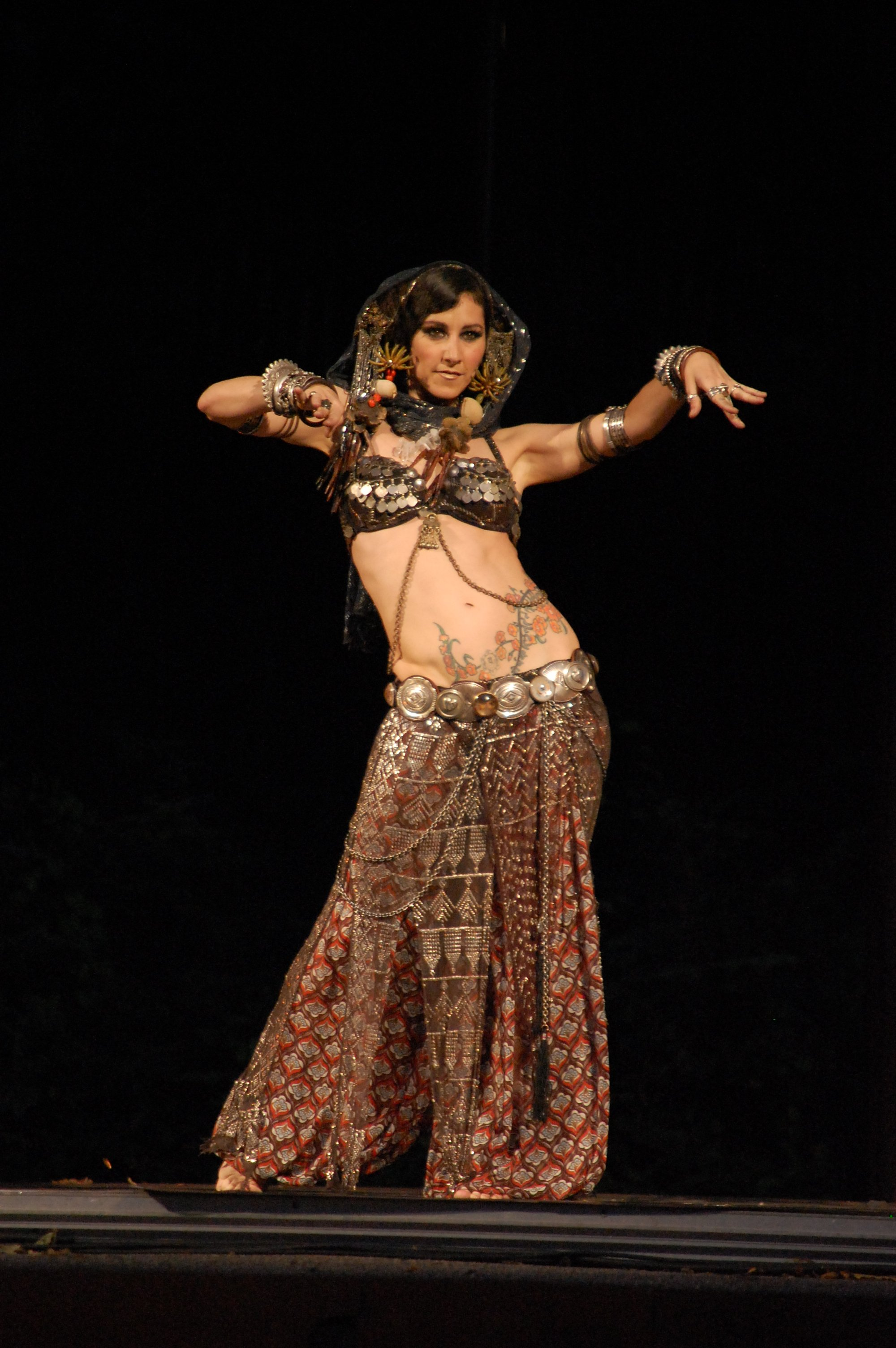
Rachel Brice, Rennes (2012)

=== Cabaret ===
Women started to sing and dance in the cabarets of Paris in the 1890s, emphasizing the female body by introducing seductive movements highlighting their breasts and hips. Most of them had no formal training, the exception being Cléo de Mérode (1875–1966) who left the Paris Opera to perform at the Folies Bergère. The major choreographer was Algerian-born Mariquita (1830–1922) who became ballet director at the Folies Bergère and the Opéra Comique. Stars of the period included the Spanish La Belle Otero from Galicia who gained fame at Charles Franconi's Cirque d'été in 1890, Émilienne d'Alençon (1869–1946) who danced at the Folies Bergère, and Dutch-born Mata Hari (1876–1917) who from 1905 became famous for her Indonesian-inspired temple dance, first in Paris and then in other European capitals. La Goulue (1866–1929) is remembered for dancing the cancan at the Moulin Rouge in the 1890s.

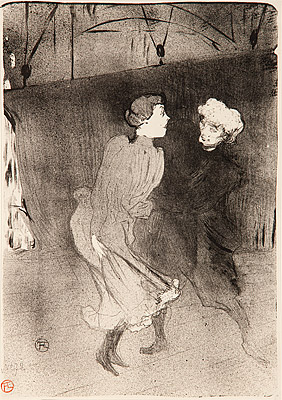
Marquita and Émilienne d'Alençon (1893)

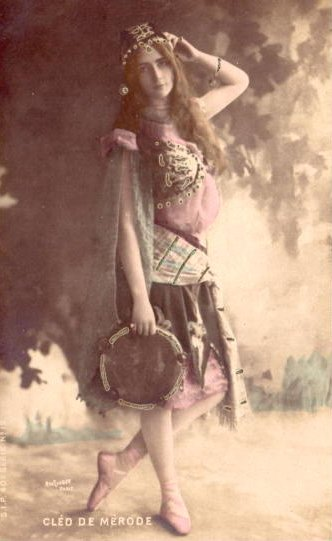
Cléo de Mérode (c. 1897)

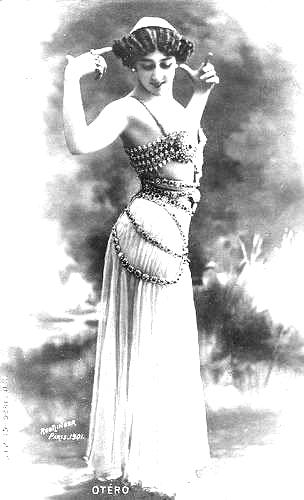
La Belle Otero (c. 1905)

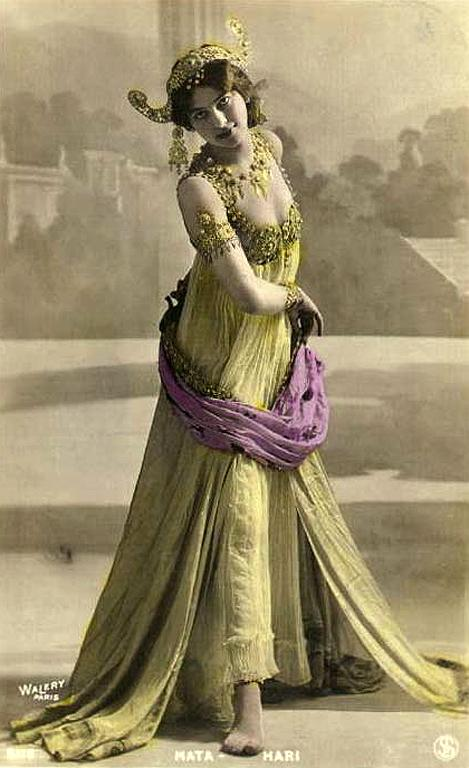
Mata Hari (1906)

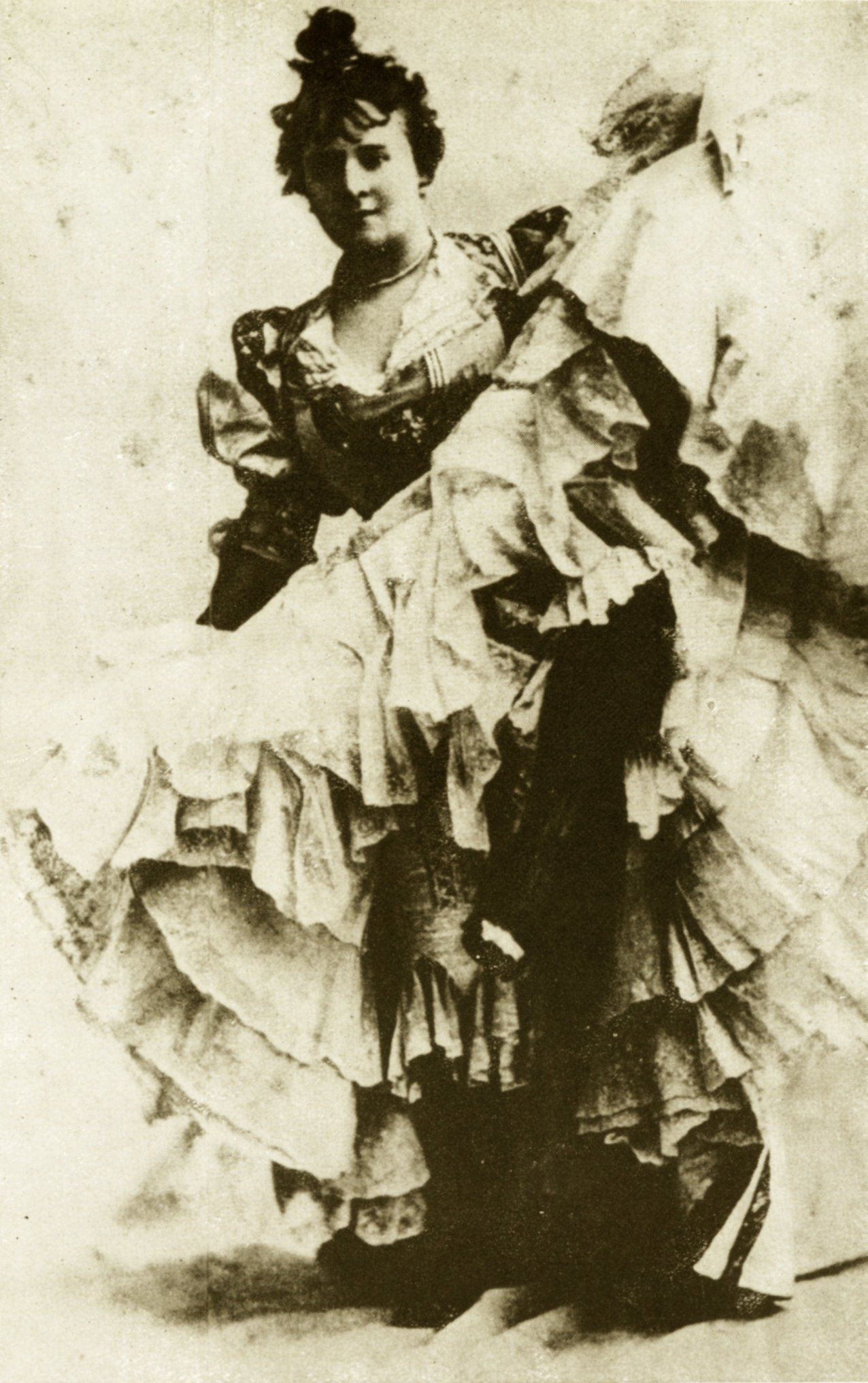
La Goulue (c. 1890)

=== African American Dance ===
Before World War II racism influenced dance in a drastic way. During this time they had social dances, such as the swing, jitterbug, and Lindy Hop, that black people created to please rich white people. Dance was therapy or a drug because during the Great Depression it was a way for them to find happiness, dancing brought races together, and even just watching it made people feel better about what they were already going through. After WWII, dance was transformed into something that everyone could easily learn how to do even if they were just starting. It was becoming more of a street social dance that everyone could enjoy and even though there was still racism but in different ways, dance was a way to enjoy life and was a new way to entertain. Other dances like the Charleston, Pattin' Juba, Jive, Spank the baby, and Boogie Back became major dance staples for the black community and many other communities of dance and social dance. These dance styles set the foundations of present-day jazz technique.

== See also ==
- List of dancers
- List of female dancers
- Women in music
- Chorus girl

== Literature ==
- Brooks, Lynn (2007). Women's Work: Making Dance in Europe Before 1800. Univ of Wisconsin Press. ISBN 978-0-299-22530-8.
- Calame, Claude (2001). Choruses of Young Women in Ancient Greece: Their Morphology, Religious Role, and Social Functions. Rowman & Littlefield. ISBN 978-0-7425-1525-3.
- Drinker, Sophie (1995). Music and Women: The Story of Women in Their Relation to Music. Feminist Press at CUNY. ISBN 978-1-55861-116-0.
- Guest, Ivor (1976). Le Ballet de l'Opéra de Paris: trois siècles d'histoire et de tradition. Théâtre national de l'Opéra.
- Lexová, Irena (2012). Ancient Egyptian Dances. Courier Dover Publications. ISBN 978-0-486-14870-0.
- Varadpande, Manohar Laxman (2006). Woman in Indian Sculpture. Abhinav Publications. ISBN 978-81-7017-474-5.
