= Madame Anatole =

French ballet dancer

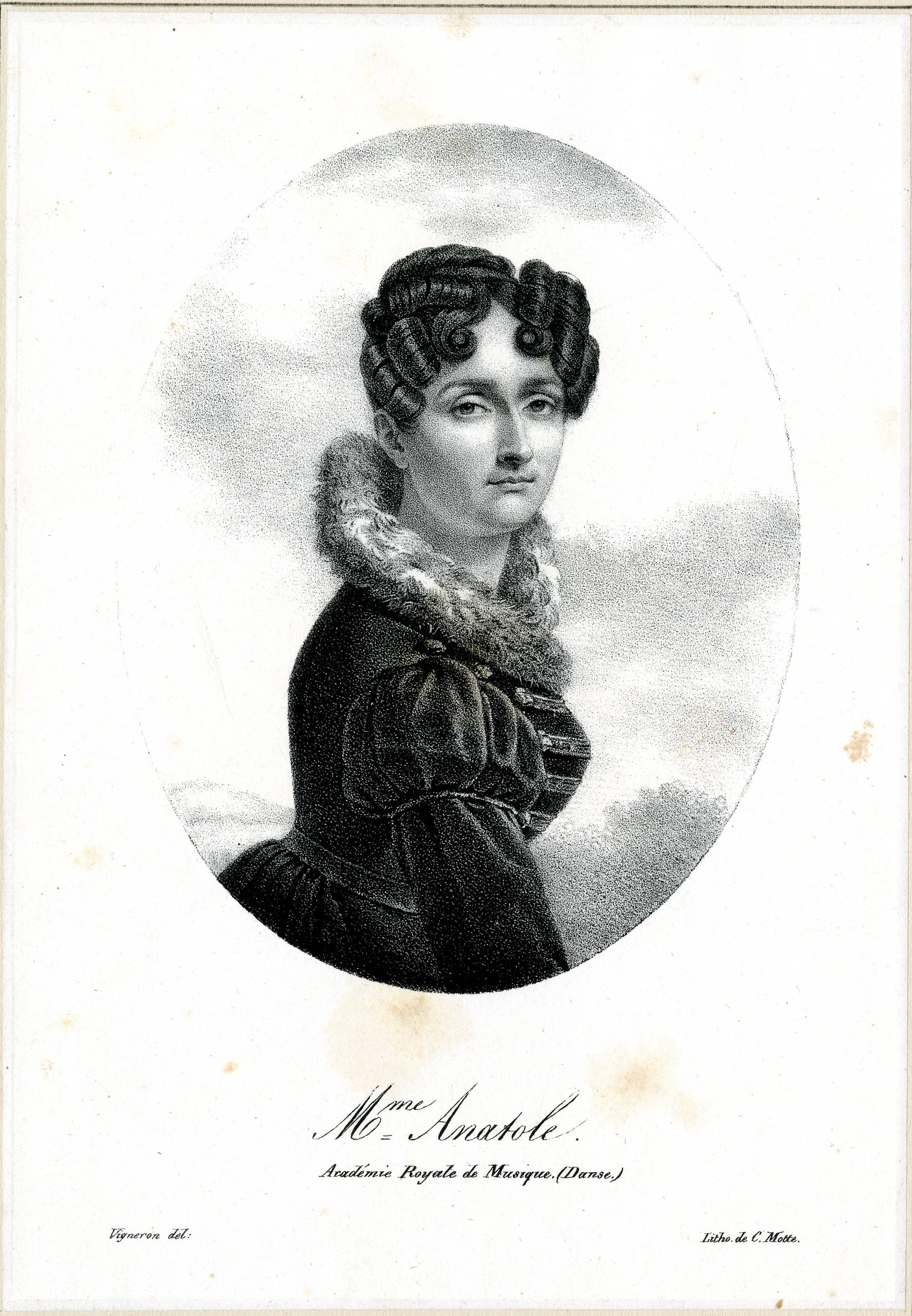
- Born: Constance-Hippolyte Gosselin; 2 January 1793; Paris, France
- Died: Unknown; Paris, France
- Other name: Mme Anatole
- Occupation: Dancer
- Years active: 1822–1830
- Spouse: Auguste-Anatole Petit
- Partner: Paul

Constance-Hippolyte Gosselin (2 January 1793, in Paris – date of death unknown) was a 19th century French ballet dancer who made her debut performance at the Opéra de Paris.

== Early life ==
Constance-Hippolyte Gosselin was born in Paris, France on 2 January 1793.

== Career ==
Gosselin débuted at the Opéra de Paris in 1810, after studying dance under Louis Duport and Jean-François Coulon. She married Auguste-Anatole Petit in 1815 and was thus also known as Madame Anatole.

Mme Anatole was made première danseuse in 1822, her principal partner was Paul DeSchkane [Family name], with whom she made a triumphal tour to London in 1822. Her dance style was elegant and discrete, predisposing her to serious roles in ballets by Pierre Gardel, Jean-Pierre Aumer and Albert. Following Madame Anatole's three-month leave in London in January 1822, where her husband served as ballet master at the King's Theatre, the Académie Royale de Musique and the King's Theatre entered into an agreement to avoid hiring each other's dancers. As ballet master, her husband Anatole chose Constance for the main role in Pandore, a ballet telling the tale of Pandora's box. Constance performed in ballets with Albert who was also performing in London at the King's Theatre in 1822. Upon her return to Paris, Paul and Lise Noblet took her place. On 9 February 1828, Madame Anatole danced in Phyllis et Melibee.

She eventually retired from performing in 1830.

== Family ==
She was the daughter of a dancing master and younger sister of the French ballet dancer Geneviève Gosselin. She was Louis-François Gosselin's older sister.

== Gallery ==
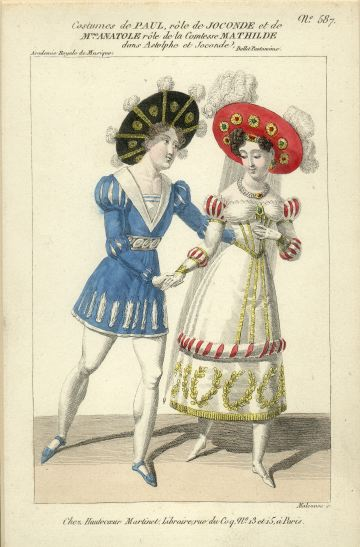
Paul and Madame Anatole in Astolphe et Joconde (1827)

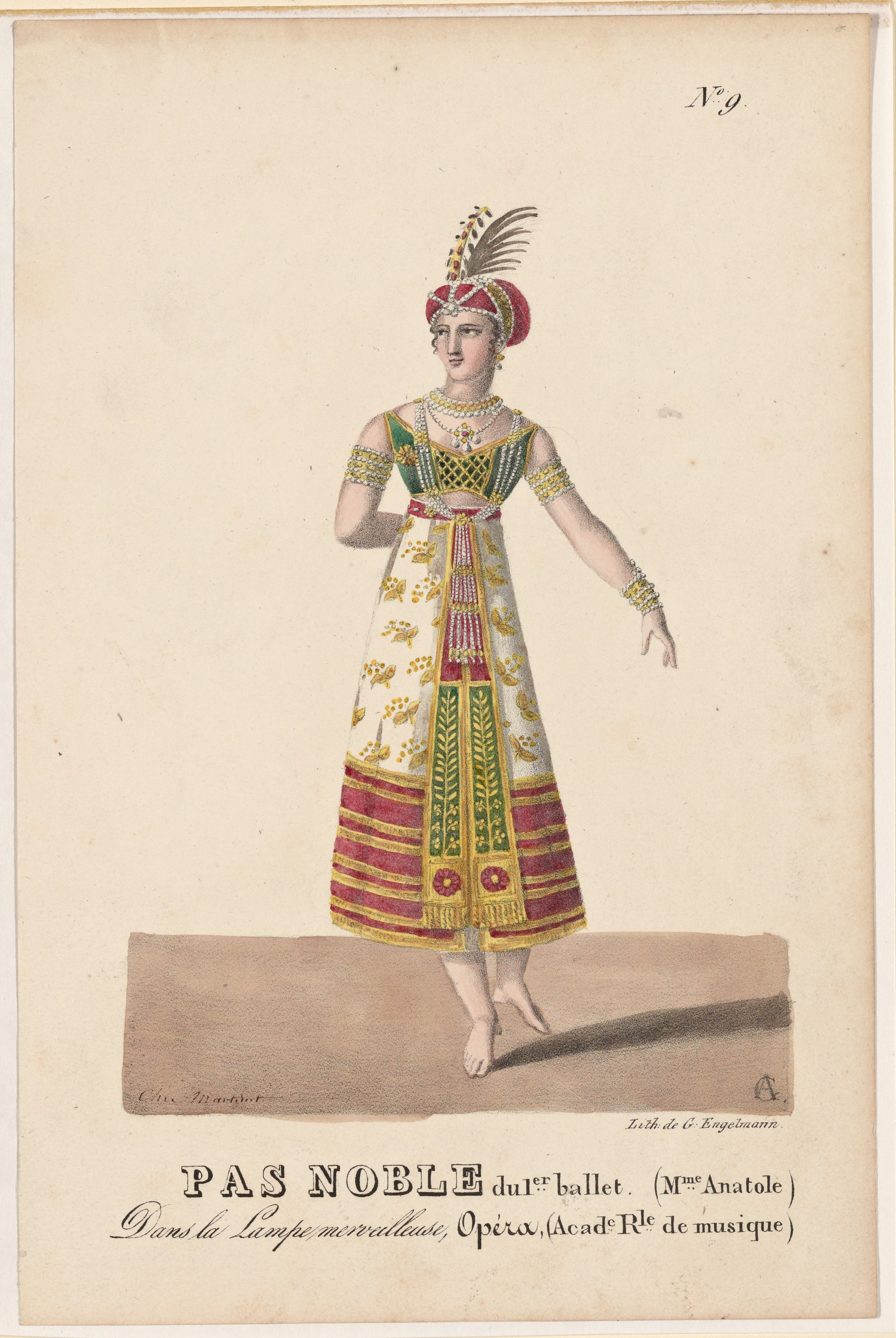
Madame Anatole in La lampe merveilleuse (c. 1820)

== See also ==
- Paris Opera
