= Louis-François Gosselin =

French ballet dancer (1800–1860)

Louis Gosselin
- Born: Louis-Francois Gosselin; 28 February 1800; Paris, France
- Died: 5 February 1860 (aged 59); Paris, France
- Other name: M. Gosselin
- Occupation: Dancer

Louis-François Gosselin (28 February 1800, in Paris – 5 February 1860, in Paris) was a French ballet dancer who performed as a premier danseur at the Opéra de Paris and Her Majesty’s Theatre in London.

== Early life ==
Louis-François Gosselin was born on 28 February 1800 in Paris, France.

He was the brother of French ballerinas Geneviève Gosselin, Constance Gosselin (wife of the dancer Auguste-Anatole Petit), and Henriette Gosselin.

== Entertainment life ==
He studied ballet with his older sister Geneviève and was formally trained by Jean-François Coulon, a ballet teacher at the ballet school of the Paris Opéra. His stage name was M. Gosselin (or Louis Gosselin).

=== Performances ===
At just 15 years old, Gosselin entered the Academie Royale de Musique (known as Paris Opéra) in 1816. He eventually became a premier danseur. He performed in Le Carnaval de Venise, a two-act ballet by Louis Milon, to music by Louis-Luc Loiseau de Persuis and Rodolphe Kreutzer, presented at the Theatre de l'Academie Royale de Musique on 22 February 1816.

He joined the cast of Jean Aumer's Les Pages du duc de Vendôme, dancing in a pas de deux on 5 September 1821. In 1826, he performed as "Apollon" in Mars et Venus, ou Les Filets de Vulcain, a pantomime ballet choreographed by Jean-Baptiste Blache. The role of "Han-Tsou" in Chao-Kang, choreographed by Louis Henry, was taken on by Gosselin for the ballet's premiere at the Théâtre Nautique on 16 October 1834.

Gosselin made appearances in London, England, as a dancer in the Ballet of Her Majesty's Theatre between 1827 and 1852. In 1830, he danced in a revival of Le Carnaval de Venise at the theatre. He later made an appearance in La Esmeralda on 9 March 1844, playing the role of "Claude Frollo". The 1846 ballet Catarina, or La Fille du Bandit featured him in the role of "Salvator Rosa," with choreography by Jules Perrot and music composed by Cesare Pugni. During the 1848 season, working in the theatre's ballet department, he was the sous-maître de ballet (assistant ballet master) to Paul Taglioni and Jules Perrot. On 15 July 1850, he choreographed a divertissement titled Les Délices du sérail which was created for Cuban singer Maria Martinez. Gosselin choreographed the work to a score composed by Cesare Pugni. In 1851, he worked with Mlle Amalia Ferraris on a choreographic segment he arranged.

Upon returning to Paris, Gosselin taught at the Opéra's ballet school from 1853 to 1860. He worked with dancers such as Fanny Cerrito, Carolina Rosati, and Nadezhda Konstantinovna Bogdanova.

== Death ==
Gosselin died on 5 February 1860 in Paris, France.
