= Ferdinand (dancer) =

French ballet dancer (1791–1837)

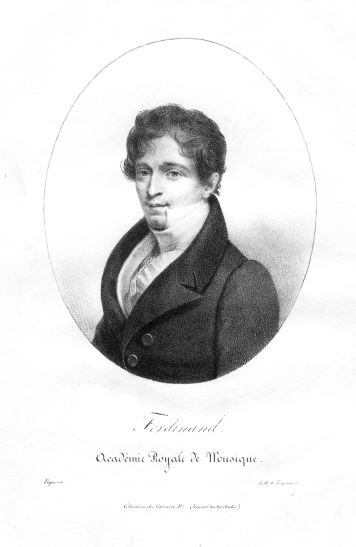
- Ferdinand, Académie royale de musique. Lithograph by Vigneron, 1825.
- Born: Jean La Brunière de Médicis; 3 November 1791; Bordeaux, France
- Died: 5 April 1837 (aged 45); Paris, France
- Occupation: Dancer

Jean La Brunière de Médicis (3 November 1791 in Bordeaux – 5 April 1837 in Paris), known by the stage name of Ferdinand, was a French ballet dancer.

== Life ==
Premier danseur in the Paris Opera Ballet from 1813 onwards, Ferdinand played the leads in all its productions until his death. One of the partners of Lise Noblet, his notable appearances with her included a tour to London in 1824.

In 1826, the author of the Nouvelle biographie théâtrale wrote an acid portrait of Ferdinand:

Ferdinand, of the Opéra, one day said to his comrade, M. Paul : I bet I jump higher than you. I bet you don't, said M. Paul; and he tried, but he was unable to do so. Seeing that he would lose his reputation for going from low to high and high to low, he began to flit from right to left and left to right, and the volubility of his legs was such that they could not be seen, and M. Paul gave himself sprains wanting to imitate him. Since then, M. Ferdinand sets the air alight here and there, and is becoming, more and more, the scourge of flies which he murders by the thousand. His limbs are all dislocated, all elastic. If he ever he gets gout, he will die in pain.

== Main roles ==
- 1820 : Le Carnaval de Venise (Louis Milon) : Fabricio
- 1823 : Le Page inconstant (Jean-Pierre Aumer) : Figaro
- 1827 : La Somnambule (Aumer) : Edmond
- 1828 : La Muette de Portici (with a ballet by Aumer) : premier danseur
- 1828 : Lydie (Aumer) : a faun
- 1829 : La Belle au bois dormant (Aumer) : Gérard
- 1830 : Manon Lescaut (Aumer) : Des Grieux
