= Paul (dancer) =

French ballet dancer (1798-1871)

Paul l'Aérien
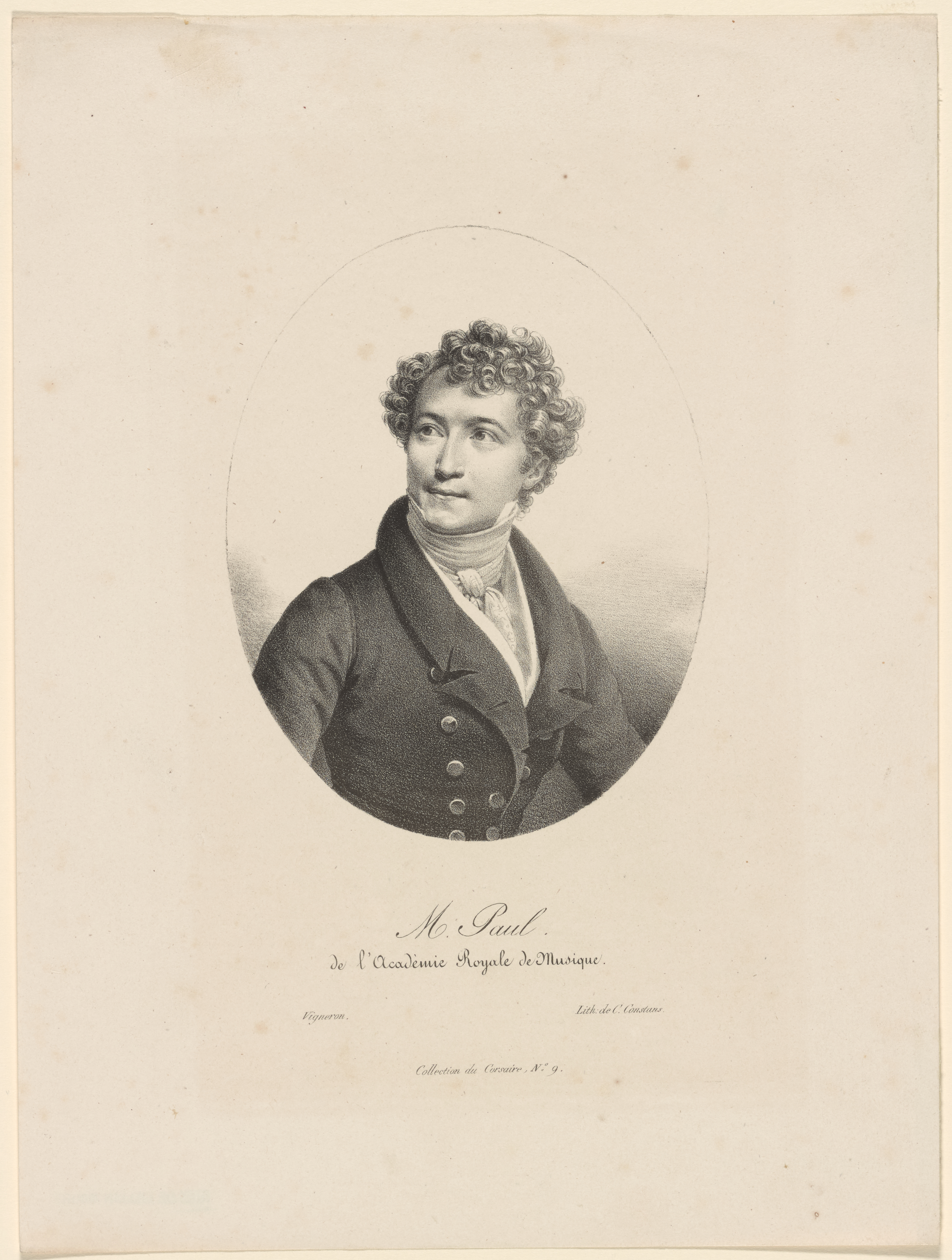
- Portrait of Paul
- Born: Antoine Paul; 21 December 1798; Marseille, France
- Died: November 1871 (aged 72); Anet, France
- Other names: Antoine Paul; Paul l'Aérien
- Occupation: Dancer
- Years active: 1820-1831
- Partner: Madame Anatole

Antoine Paul (21 December 1798 in Marseille – November 1871 in Anet) known professionally as Paul, was a French ballet dancer.

== Biography ==
=== Early life ===
Antoine Paul was born on 21 December 1798 in Marseille, France.

=== Entertainment life ===
Some of Paul's earliest roles were at the Théâtre des Célestins. After dancing in Lyon and Bordeaux, Paul debuted in Paris at the Académie Royale de Musique (known as Opéra de Paris). He performed for the first time at the Opéra on 11 May 1813. He was regarded as the successor of Auguste Vestris who was set to retire from the stage. He quickly became one of the public's favourite premier danseurs. This opportunity allowed him to secure admission for his sister, Madame Montessu, into the Académie Royale de Musique. Two years later, she debuted as a ballet dancer alongside Paul. He made an appearance in Tarare on 3 February 1819. He also performed in the premiere of Clari ou la promesse de mariage on 19 June 1820, choreographed by Louis Milon with music composed by Rodolphe Kreutzer.

Nicknamed "l'Aérien" (the Aerial) due to his technical qualities, August Bournonville stated "Paul's superiority is his lightness, elasticity, speed, softness and precision. He knows how to combine daring and natural grace."

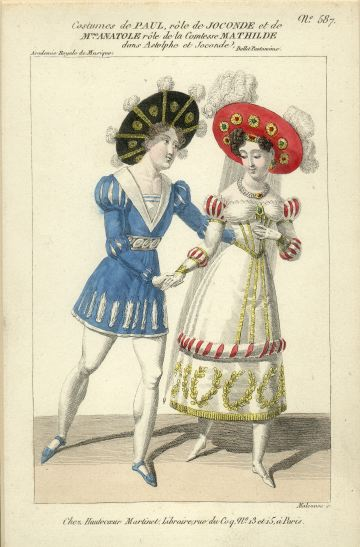
Paul and Madame Anatole in Astolphe et Joconde (1827)

In addition to the Académie Royale de Musique, he regularly performed in London, with partners including his sister Madame Montessu and Madame Anatole. In 1822, he performed at the King's Theatre in London with Lise Noblet. In Paris, Paul danced in the ballet Aladin, ou La lampe merveilleuse on 6 February 1822. He danced in the "Army of Aladdin" in act two and alongside Émilie Bigottini and Fanny Elssler in act three. He played the role of Osmin in Aline, reine de Golconde, a ballet premiered on 1 October, 1823 by Jean Aumer with music by Gustave Dugazon. He danced in a revival of the tragedy Armide in 1825. Paul was cast as Zephyr in Mars et Vénus ou les filets de Vulcain, a ballet-pantomime by Jean-Baptiste Blache with music by Jean Schneitzhoeffer on 29 May 1826. During the performance, he featured in a pas de trois, dancing alongside Lise Noblet, who portrayed Venus, and Madame Montessu, who performed as Flora. On 29 January 1827, Paul performed in Astolphe et Joconde, ou les Coureurs d'aventures, a comic opera arranged as a ballet by Jean Aumer with music by Ferdinand Hérold. He played the role of Joconde with Albert cast as Prince Astolphe. Around August in the summer of 1828, Paul was finishing up performances at the Lyon theatre. The dancer later appeared in Jean Aumer's Belle au bois dormant, with music arranged by Hérold and a libretto by Eugène Scribe. It premiered on 27 April 1829 and featured a cast that included Mme Taglioni, Mme Noblet, Mme Legallois, Mme Anatole, Albert, Ferdinand, Montjoye, and Mérante. In 1830, he was a principal dancer in Daniel Auber's La Muette de Portici.

Paul l'Aérien also performed in Naples, Italy, where he was praised by Stendhal. He retired from the stage in 1831.

== Death ==
Antoine Paul died in November 1871 in Anet, France.

== See also ==
- Paris Opera
