= Geneviève Gosselin =

French ballet dancer (1791–1818)

Mlle Gosselin
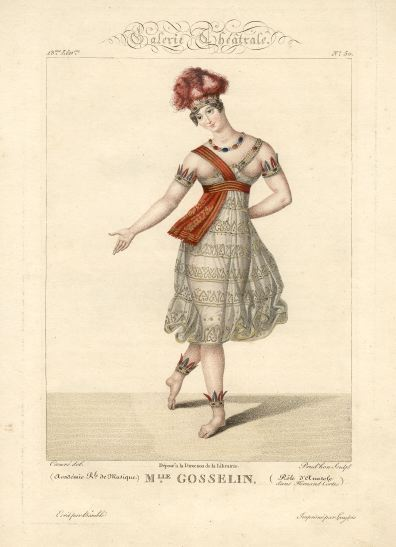
- Mlle Gosselin (c. 1815)
- Born: Geneviève-Adélaïde Gosselin; 1791; Paris, France
- Died: 1818 (aged 26–27); Paris, France
- Other name: Mlle Gosselin
- Occupation: Dancer
- Years active: 1806-1816

Geneviève-Adélaïde Gosselin (1791 – 1818) was a French ballet dancer known for being the first dancer en pointe.

== Biography ==
=== Early life ===
Geneviève Gosselin was the daughter of a ballet master and was also the eldest sister of three other famous ballerinas of the Paris Opera Ballet. Her sister Constance Gosselin was the wife of the dancer Auguste-Anatole Petit. Another sibling, Louis-François Gosselin, was a premier dancer in London and Paris and her other sister, Henriette Gosselin, danced with the Paris Opera from 1821 to 1830.

=== Ballet career ===
Geneviève studied under Jean-François Coulon, who was one of the most renowned teachers in Europe at the time. He became professor of the "classe de perfectionnement" at the Opéra de Paris in 1807 and also helped in the production of pointe shoes after 1810. Gosselin joined the Opéra de Paris in 1806 at the age of fifteen. She had excellent technique and was the first dancer to develop the art of being en pointe in 1813. Julien Louis Geoffroy initially championed Gosselin, among other young performers, but considered public enthusiasm overblown.

In 1815, she was cast as the heroine in Flore et Zéphire, one of the first romantic ballets of the time. The ballet was choreographed by Charles Didelot, the chief choreographer of the Russian Imperial Ballet. Didelot had created a "flying machine", instituting the use of cables and wires to give the appearance of weightlessness. Because of his invention, Geneviève Gosselin could perform in pointe shoes. This was the first appearance of dancers en pointe. Gosselin was only able to balance for brief moments on the pointe shoes (although one critic says that she balanced for one minute). Maurice Brillant and John Chapman noted the significance of Gosselin as Marie Taglioni's predecessor. Gosselin withdrew from the stage in 1816, coinciding with the retirement of Auguste Vestris. Geneviève Gosselin died at the age of 27 in 1818, three years after her appearance en pointe.

Her astonishing flexibility of limb and her muscular power, which allowed her to remain suspended for a minute or two on the extreme tips of her feet. The lightness of her choreographic evolutions, the elegance of her stature, and finally that prodigious facility to accomplish difficulties with that air of abandon, naturalness and softness which was the triumph of art, and within art disappeared entirely.

— Castil-Blaze, Journal des débats, 3 August 1827

== See also ==
- Amalia Brugnoli
- Jules Perrot
- Louis Duport

== Sources ==
Bibliography

- Chapman, John V. (1987). "Auguste Vestris and the Expansion of Technique". Dance Research Journal. 19 (1): 11–18. doi:10.2307/1477765. ISSN 0149-7677. JSTOR 1477765. S2CID 190697065.
