= Anatole (dancer) =

French ballet dancer and ballet master (1789–1857)

- Born: Auguste-Anatole Petit; 5 March 1789; France
- Died: 22 May 1857 (aged 68); France
- Other name: Monsieur Anatole
- Occupations: Dancer; Ballet master
- Spouse: Madame Anatole

Auguste-Anatole Petit, known as Monsieur Anatole (5 March 1789 – 22 May 1857), was a French ballet dancer, master and composer.

== Biography ==
Premier danseur at the Opéra de Paris from at least 1814, in 1815 he married the dancer Constance-Hippolyte Gosselin. Travelling to Brussels in 1818, Anatole and Eugène Hus revived Nina ou la Folle par amour (a ballet by Louis Milon first put on in Paris in 1813) at the Théâtre de la Monnaie.

Anatole remained premier danseur at the Opéra de Paris until 1822, then (after a nearly 10 year blank in the historical record) he is evidenced as a ballet master at the Théâtre de la Porte Saint-Martin, replacing Jean Coralli when the latter was summoned to Vienna by imperial decree. Anatole only held this role for half a season before reappearing in 1836 as a ballet master at the town theatre in Bruges, before ending his career as a professor at the dance school at the Opéra de Paris.

== Works ==
He wrote only one ballet, Le Sicilien ou l'Amour peintre (The Sicilian, or Love the Painter). This was put on at the Opéra on 11 June 1827, with music originally written by Fernando Sor and completed by Jean Schneitzhoeffer. The main rôles in the production were held by Albert, Ferdinand and Lise Noblet, and another cast member was Madame Montessu. The work had its first success a month into the run, when Marie Taglioni and her brother Paul appeared in it, making their débuts.
