= Ludwig Wilhelm Reuling =

German composer and conductor

Ludwig Wilhelm Reuling (also Wilhelm Ludwig Reuling; 22 December 1802 – 29 April 1877) was a German composer and conductor at opera houses in Vienna.

== Life ==
Reuling was born in Darmstadt in 1802; his father was the city priest of the Protestant church. His first music lessons were at his parents' home. From 1818 he studied violin and composition with Christian Heinrich Rinck, and from 1819 was in the orchestra of the court theatre of Darmstadt.

In 1824 he moved to Vienna, where he studied with Ignaz von Seyfried and Emanuel Aloys Förster. Becoming acquainted with members of the Theater in der Josefstadt, he composed short works for the theatre, which were well received. His Zauberoper Das graue Männchen (The dull little man), commissioned by the theatre and performed in October 1829 was successful, and as a result he became Kapellmeister of the Theater in der Josefstadt. He composed Singspiele for this theatre, and for the Theater in der Leopoldstadt and the Theater an der Wien; other commissions included two operas that were performed in Trieste.

From 1830 Reuling was Kapellmeister at the Theater am Kärntnertor. While Louis Duport was director until 1836, he wrote many Singspiele and ballets, ephemeral pieces that were later forgotten. He conducted operas including Daniel Auber's Die Ballnacht (Gustave III) in 1835 and Haydée in 1849; in 1840 the theatre performed his opera Alfred der Große.

In 1854 he left the Theater am Kärntnertor with a pension, and the following year returned to Darmstadt. He devoted himself to composition, writing choral works and orchestral pieces; he later moved to Munich, where he died in 1877.

== Compositions ==
Reuling wrote 6 operas: Ulysses, three acts; Die Räuberhöhle ("The Robber's Den"), three acts; Der blinde Harfner ("The Blind Harpist") three acts, and Die Feuerbraut, two acts, both performed in Trieste in 1829; Alfred der Große ("Alfred the Great"), three acts, performed at the Theater am Kärntnertor in 1840; and Der letzte Graf von Anxor ("The Last Count of Anxor").

He wrote many Singspiele and ballets for the Theater am Kärntnertor; also overtures, choral music and chamber music.
