= Madame Montessu =

French ballet dancer (1803-1877)

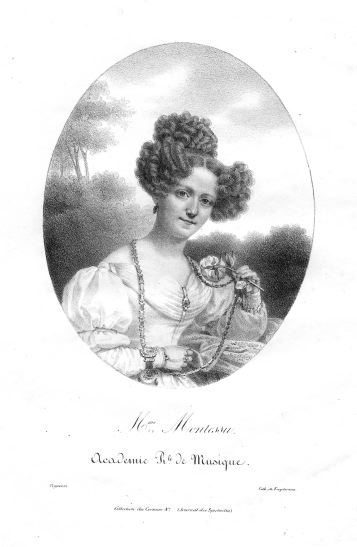
- Madame Montessu (engraving by Vigneron, 1825)
- Born: Pauline-Euphrosine Paul; 5 June 1803; Marseille, France
- Died: 1 August 1877 (aged 74); Amiens, France
- Other name: Mme Montessu
- Occupation: Dancer
- Years active: 1820-1836
- Spouse: Laurent-François-Alexandre Montessu

Pauline-Euphrosine Paul (5 June 1803 – 1 August 1877) was a French ballet dancer.

== Biography ==
=== Early life ===
Pauline-Euphrosine Paul was born on 5 June 1803 in Marseille, France.

=== Entertainment life ===
Pauline was the younger sister and student of the dancer Paul who became a favorite at the Académie Royale de Musique (known as Opéra de Paris). She benefited from his influence, securing her place at the Académie and later joined her brother on stage. She was admitted to the Paris Opera Ballet, where she debuted on 17 July 1820 beside him.

She married the dancer Laurent-François-Alexandre Montessu in 1821 and was thus also known as Madame Montessu.

She created the roles of La Fille mal gardée (1828) and Manon Lescaut by Jean-Pierre Aumer (1830).

She was première danseuse until 1836, when she retired, although she continued to put on productions here and there, notably at Amsterdam in 1840, with André Isidore Carey.

== Death ==
Pauline-Euphrosine Paul died in Amiens, France on 1 August 1877.
