= Catarina or La Fille du Bandit =

Ballet

Lithograph by J. Branard of Lucile Grahn in the title role of the Perrot/Pugni Catarina. Here Grahn is costumed for the celebrated Pas Stragétique. London, 1846

Catarina ou la Fille du bandit is a ballet in three acts and four scenes, with libretto and choreography by Jules Perrot and music by Cesare Pugni. The libretto is based on an incident in the life of the Italian painter Salvator Rosa. The work was first presented by the Ballet of Her Majesty's Theatre on 3 March 1846 in London, England, with Lucile Grahn (as Catarina, leader of the bandits), Louis-François Gosselin (as Salvator Rosa), and Jules Perrot (as the Lieutenant Diavolino).

== Revivals ==
- Restaging by Jules Perrot for the Ballet of the Teatro alla Scala, with Giacomo Panizza revising Cesare Pugni's original score and Giovanni Bajetti. First presented on 9 January 1847 in Milan, Italy, with Fanny Elssler (as Catarina, leader of the bandits), Effisio Catte (as Salvator Rosa), and Jules Perrot (as the Lieutenant Diavolino).
- Restaging by Jules Perrot for the Imperial Ballet, with Cesare Pugni revising his original score. First presented at the Imperial Bolshoi Kamenny Theatre on February 4/16 (Julian/Gregorian calendar dates), 1849 in St. Petersburg, Russia. Principal dancers: Fanny Elssler (as Catarina, leader of the bandits), Christian Johansson (as Salvator Rosa), and Jules Perrot (as the Lieutenant Diavolino). At a rehearsal for this production, the Emperor Nicholas I of Russia was present. He noticed that Fanny Elssler and the dancers of the corps de ballet were not carrying the guns properly and began to show them how to hold a gun.
- Restaging by Roman Turczynowicz for the Ballet of the Grand Theatre in Warsaw (Poland), with Józef Stefani revising Cesare Pugni's original score. First presented on 22 September 1850, with Konstancja Turczynowicz (as Catarina, leader of the bandits), Aleksander Tarnowski (as Salvator Rosa), and Feliks Krzesiński / Felix Kschessinsky (as Diavolino).
- Revival by Antonio-Manuel Abrami for the Ballet of the Teatro alla Scala, with Girolamo Trigambi revising Cesare Pugni's score. First presented on 25 January 1853 in Milan, Italy, with Sofia Fuoco (as Catarina, leader of the bandits) and Giancarlo Molinari (as the Lieutenant Diavolino).

Lucile Grahn as Catarina with Jules Perrot as Diavolino in the celebrated Polka de Catarina from the Perrot/Pugni Catarina, London, 1846

- Odessa (Russian Empire), touring troupe of Elena Andreianova.
- Revival by Marius Petipa for the Imperial Ballet, with Yuli Gerber revising and making additions to Cesare Pugni's score. November 1/13 (Julian/Gregorian calendar dates), 1870. First presented at the Imperial Bolshoi Kamenny Theatre in St. Petersburg, Russia, with Adèle Grantzow (as Catarina, leader of the bandits) and Pavel Gerdt (as the Lieutenant Diavolino).

This revival of Catarina was produced for a benefit performance in honour of the composer Cesare Pugni, who died in January that same year. All of the opening night's box office receipts were given to the composer's family.

- Revival by Enrico Cecchetti for the Imperial Ballet, with Riccardo Drigo revising and adding new music to Cesare Pugni's score (in the version revised by Yuli Gerber). First presented at the Imperial Mariinsky Theatre on October 25/November 6 (Julian/Gregorian calendar dates), 1888 in St. Petersburg, Russia. Principal dancers: Elena Cornalba (as Catarina, leader of the bandits) and Pavel Gerdt (as the Lieutenant Diavolino).
- Revival by Fredy Franzutti as Catarina, ossia La figlia del bandito for the Balletto del Teatro dell'Opera di Roma. First presented at the Teatro dell'Opera di Roma on 11 May 2007 in Rome, Italy, with Gaia Straccamore (as Catarina, leader of the bandits), Mario Marozzi (as Salvator Rosa), and Alessandro Molin (as the Lieutenant Diavolino).

== See also ==
- List of ballets by title
- List of historical ballet characters
