= Alexis Dupont =

French opera singer (1796–1874)

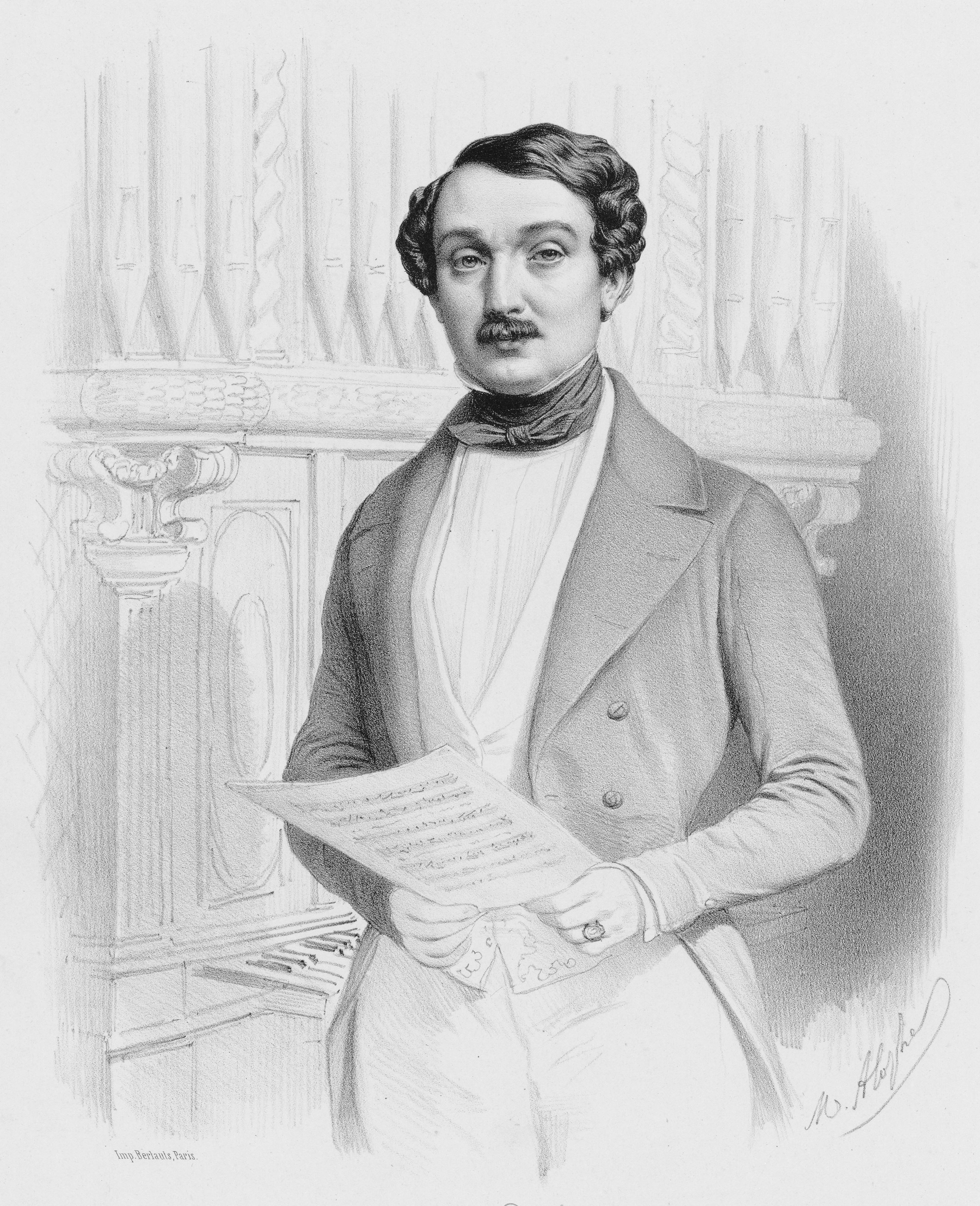
Alexis Dupont in 1840

Alexis Dupont (1796 – 29 May 1874) was a French operatic tenor who sang at the Opéra-Comique from 1821 to 1823 and the Paris Opera from 1826 to 1841. There he created a number of roles in operas by Rossini, Auber, Halévy and Meyerbeer. He had a significant association with Berlioz, creating the tenor solo in Roméo et Juliette in 1839; and he sang in the Mozart Requiem at Chopin's funeral in 1849.

== Career ==
He was born Pierre-Auguste Dupont, most likely in Paris, where he graduated from the Conservatory in 1818. He began his career as a concert singer, then made his debut at the Opéra-Comique in 1821 as Azor in Grétry's Zémire et Azor and also created the role of Charles in Auber's Emma, ou La promesse imprudente (7 July 1821). In 1823 Dupont left the Opéra-Comique in order to undertake further vocal training in Italy. After returning to France he made his debut at the Paris Opera in 1826 as Pylades in Gluck's Iphigénie en Tauride and continued to sing there until 1841.

In July 1827, he sang in Hector Berlioz's cantata La mort d'Orphée at its examination for the Prix de Rome. The examiners declared Berlioz's work unplayable, the Prix going to Jean-Baptiste Guiraud. Berlioz planned to prove them wrong, and arranged a public performance for May of the following year, with Dupont again singing. In the event, Dupont was ill, and Berlioz had to substitute the "Resurrexit" from his Messe solennelle (1824) for the concert.

He was a foundation Sociétaire of the Société des concerts du Conservatoire, founded by François Habeneck (4 March 1828).

Under the composer's baton, Dupont sang the tenor solo in the prologue of Berlioz's dramatic symphony Roméo et Juliette at the premiere on 24 November 1839. In August 1844 he took part in a "monster concert" staged by Berlioz, which involved 1,025 performers. Dupont was one of the 100 tenors in the chorus.

In 1846 Charles Hervey described Dupont's voice as a "sweet but delicate organ [that] was drowned by the orchestra of the Académie Royal [the name of the Paris Opera at the time]". Among Dupont's most highly regarded roles at the Opera were Raimbaut in Meyerbeer's Robert le diable, the title role in Rossini's Le comte Ory, and above all, in 1841, Don Ottavio in Don Juan, Castil-Blaze's infamous 1834 adaptation of Mozart's Don Giovanni.

He participated at the consecration of the Grand Organ at the Church of the Madeleine in 1846. At the same church, he was to sing the tenor role in the Mozart Requiem at Frédéric Chopin's funeral in October 1849.

One of his performances earned him a letter of congratulations signed by 21 members of the 1853 Comité de L'Association des Artistes musiciens, including names such as Adolphe Adam, Ambroise Thomas and Giacomo Meyerbeer. Charles Gounod dedicated his chanson "Où voulez-vous aller?" to Alexis Dupont.

His wife was a noted ballerina. Born Félicité Noblet in 1807, after marrying Alexis Dupont she also became known as Mme Alexis Dupont. She died in 1877. She was the sister of another ballerina, Lise Noblet, who danced the title part in Auber's La muette de Portici at its premiere, in which her brother-in-law Dupont also created a singing role.

Alexis Dupont retired from opera in 1841 but continued to sing in public until 1856. In September 1856, having been involved in sex offences ("outrage public à la pudeur") committed with girls under the age of 21 years (the age of majority in France at this time), he was sentenced to 15 months imprisonment. He died in Paris, avenue des Ternes, on 29 May 1874.

== Roles created by Dupont ==
The operatic roles he created (at the Salle Le Peletier of the Paris Opera under the baton of François Habeneck, unless otherwise noted) include:

- Eliézer in Rossini's Moïse et Pharaon, the Paris French adaptation of his Mosè in Egitto (26 March 1827; conducted by Henri Valentino)
- Alphonse in Auber's La muette de Portici (29 February 1828, conducted by Valentino)
- 1st Knight in Rossini's Le comte Ory (20 August 1828)
- Ruodi, a fisherman in Rossini's William Tell (3 August 1829, conducted by Valentino)
- the demon Asmodée in Halévy's opera-ballet La tentation (20 June 1832)
- Warting in Auber's Gustave III (27 February 1833)
- Tavannes in Meyerbeer's Les Huguenots (29 February 1836)
- Le Vicomte de Gif in Louise Bertin's La Esmeralda (14 November 1836).
