= La somnambule, ou L'arrivée d'un nouveau seigneur =

Ballet-pantomime composed by Ferdinand Hérold

La somnambule is a ballet-pantomime composed by Ferdinand Hérold and premiered on 19 September 1827 at the Académie Royale de Musique. The scenario was by Eugène Scribe, and it was choreographed by Jean-Pierre Aumer. This ballet was produced in 1827 at the height of a fashion for stage works incorporating somnambulism. The work was quite popular in Paris and inspired many more works incorporating somnambulism, including Vincenzo Bellini's well-known Italian opera La sonnambula.

Although the work was unperformed for over 150 years and remains unpublished, it was rediscovered and recorded under the direction of conductor Richard Bonynge, and released in 2005.
