= Maria Martínez (singer) =

19th-century Cuban musician

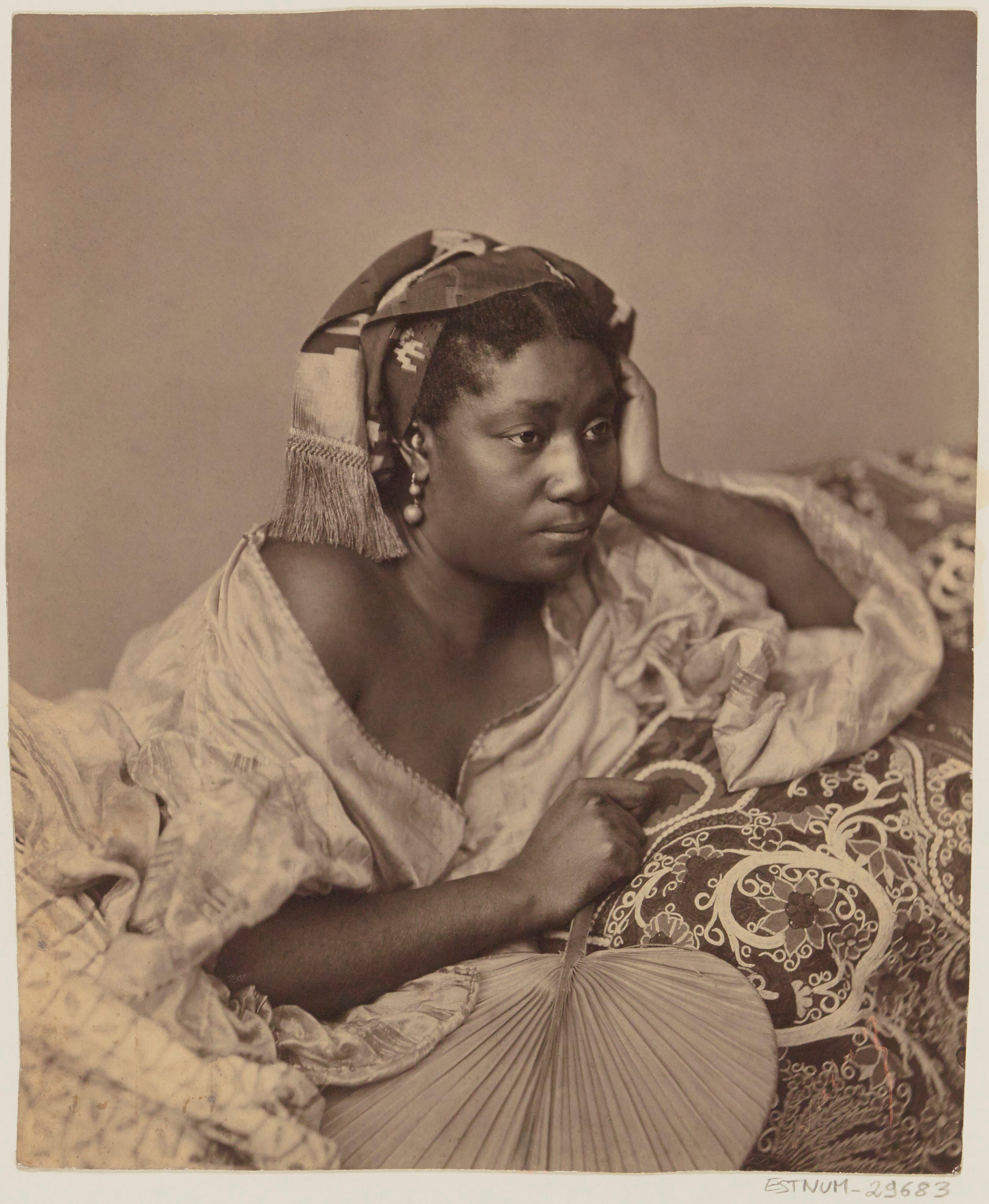
- "Maria L'Antillaise" by Nadar, tentatively identified as Martínez
- Born: Ana María Loreto Martínez c. 1820; Havana, Cuba
- Occupations: Guitarist, singer

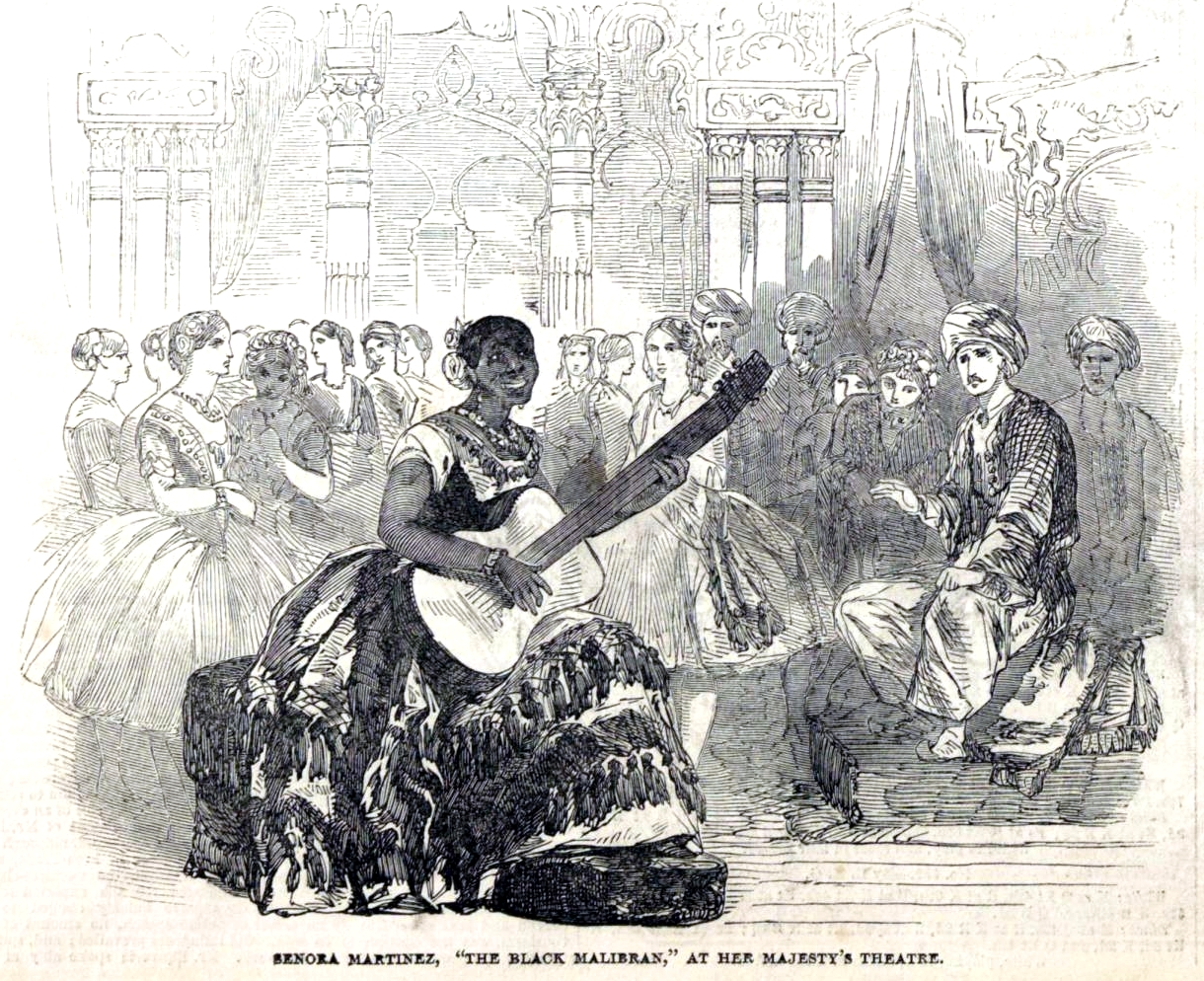
"Senora-Martinez The Black Malibran at Her Majesty's Theatre" as depicted in The Illustrated London News, July 1850

Ana María Loreto Martínez was a Cuban guitarist and singer who was active in Spain, France, and the United Kingdom in the mid-19th century. Originating in Cuba, she moved to Seville and studied at the Madrid Royal Conservatory. She performed to prominent audiences in Paris and later London, at Her Majesty's Theatre, which attracted significant press coverage.

== Early life and family ==
Martínez was born in Havana, Cuba, to free Black parents. Her father was a cabinetmaker, employed at a store called "La Gamba". Her musical abilities were recognised at a young age and she became part of the family of the Intendente of Havana, Don Francisco Aguilar, and was educated with his daughters.

Aguilar and his family returned to their native Spain, and Martinez accompanied them, settling in Seville. Martínez married Don Mariano Morena, a Cuban army officer, but the couple were later forced to leave Cuba after falling foul of the Cuban authorities.

== Career ==
Martínez returned to Seville and taught guitar to pay for her entry to the Madrid Royal Conservatory. Martínez impressed Queen Isabella II of Spain and received a "life pension" from her in 1848, though it was ended two years later in 1850, after which Martínez frequently struggled financially. Martínez later performed in Paris to great success.

=== July 1850 performances at Her Majesty's Theatre, London ===
In July 1850 Martínez appeared in a divertissement at Her Majesty's Theatre in London called Les Delices du Serail, set in a seraglio. After the curtain came up, a Sultan was shown amused by the dances of odalisques. Martínez then appeared "attired in a suit of rich amber-coloured satin" and performed. Her debut appearance at the theatre had been twice delayed by the closure of the theatre as a result of the death of Prince Adolphus, Duke of Cambridge, and her vocal hoarseness. The Times wrote that "the expectations of the public...were not a little wound up".

In London Martínez was marketed as the 'Black Malibran', in reference to the Spanish singer Maria Malibran. Edward Walford, writing in Old and New London (1878) wrote Martínez "sang quaint Spanish melodies". The opera manager Benjamin Lumley wrote in his History of the Opera, that Martinez's songs were "full of original charm, her execution excellent, her voice sweet, pure, and true; but the whole performance was small almost to meagreness, and, although it might well be regarded as a piquant musical curiosity, it failed in any real power of attraction". The Illustrated London News described her voice as "wild, quaint and graceful" with its "dominant qualities" of "picturesqueness and its strong and unanticipated contrasts" and described her vocal quality as "sweet and luscious". The Times wrote that her singing was "quaint and pointed, especially when she seems to give vent to a flow of spirits".The Times wrote that "much applause" followed each song, but concluded that "enough disapprobation was mingled with approval to render it pretty certain the Cuban style of vocalisation will not get a permanent foothold in this country".

Martínez's race was frequently commented on in contemporary accounts.The Illustrated London News wrote that "the fame of this lady had reached us and as a mark of social progress in the 'black race' was to us fraught with peculiar interest". The Times wrote that the appearance in one of the boxes of Her Majesty's Theatre of "a lady of colour has caused much conversation in the lobbies". Later 19th century accounts of her used racist language. In a chapter entitled "The Desecration of the Stage" in the periodical Time, an anonymous writer wrote that "the idea of nigger minstrelsy had not yet suggested itself" before Martinez was introduced to the "English opera goer" after a "great flourish of trumpets" and lamented the contemporaneous appearance of the Mastodon Minstrels.

=== Paris, France ===
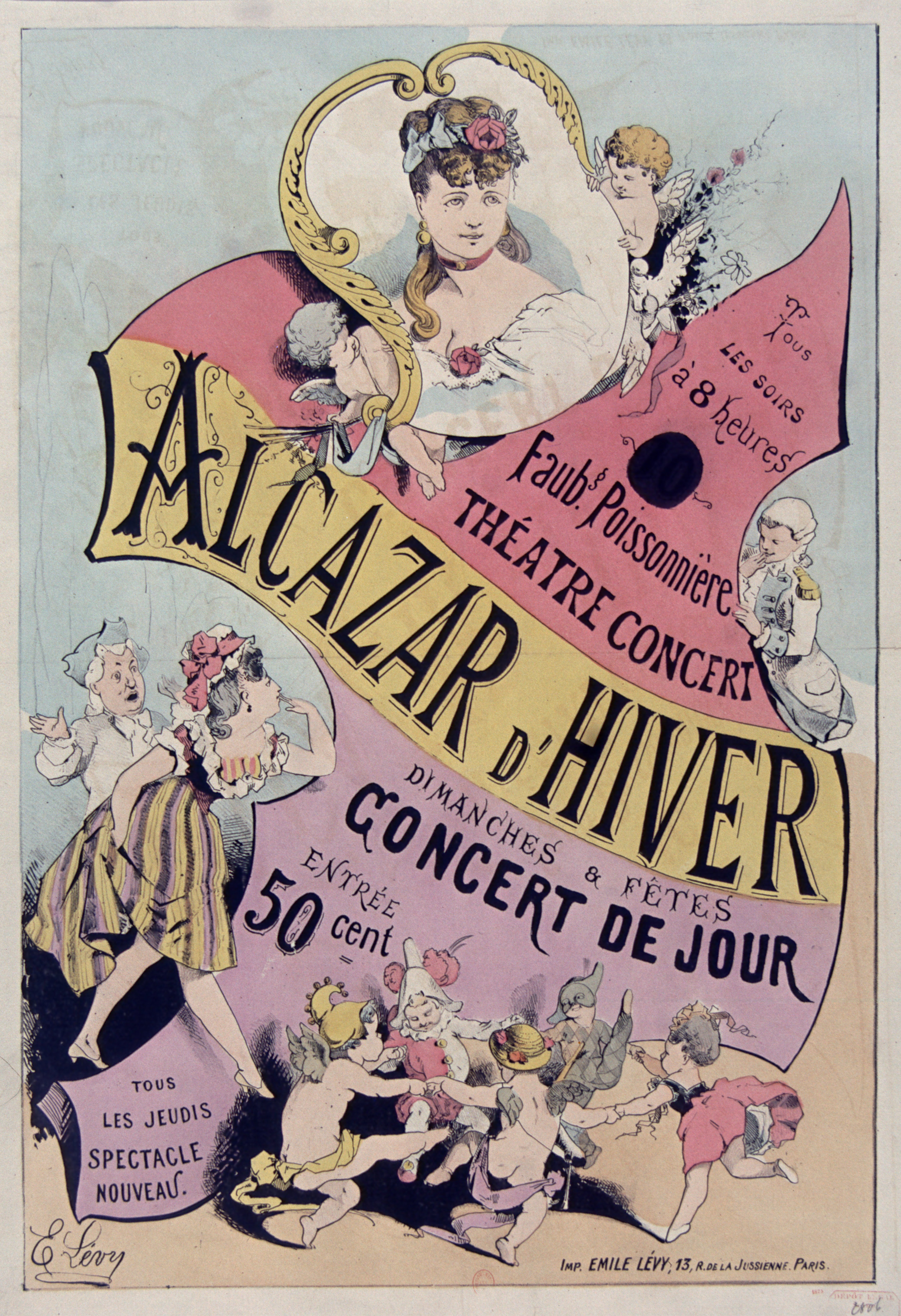
Poster for an 1875 performance at the Alcazar d'Hiver

Martínez resided in France around 1858–1863. The French writer Théophile Gautier corresponded with Martínez while she was in Paris earlier in 1850, marveling at "La Malibran" and recommending her to various theaters and operas. Between 1856 and 1859 Félix Nadar took a series of studio photographs of "Maria l'Antillaise", thought to be of Maria Martínez. She continued to struggle financially while performing, and transitioned from performing in operas and theaters to cafes, such as the Alcazar at 10 rue Faubourg Poissonnière. Charles Baudelaire wrote of her in a letter to Apollonie Sabatier, "Did you know that the unfortunate [l'infortunée] Mrs. Martínez was hanging out in the lyrical cafes and that she was singing a few days ago at the Alcazar?" She did not find the success of her earlier performances, and returned to Spain in 1863.
