= Jean-François Coulon =

French ballet dancer

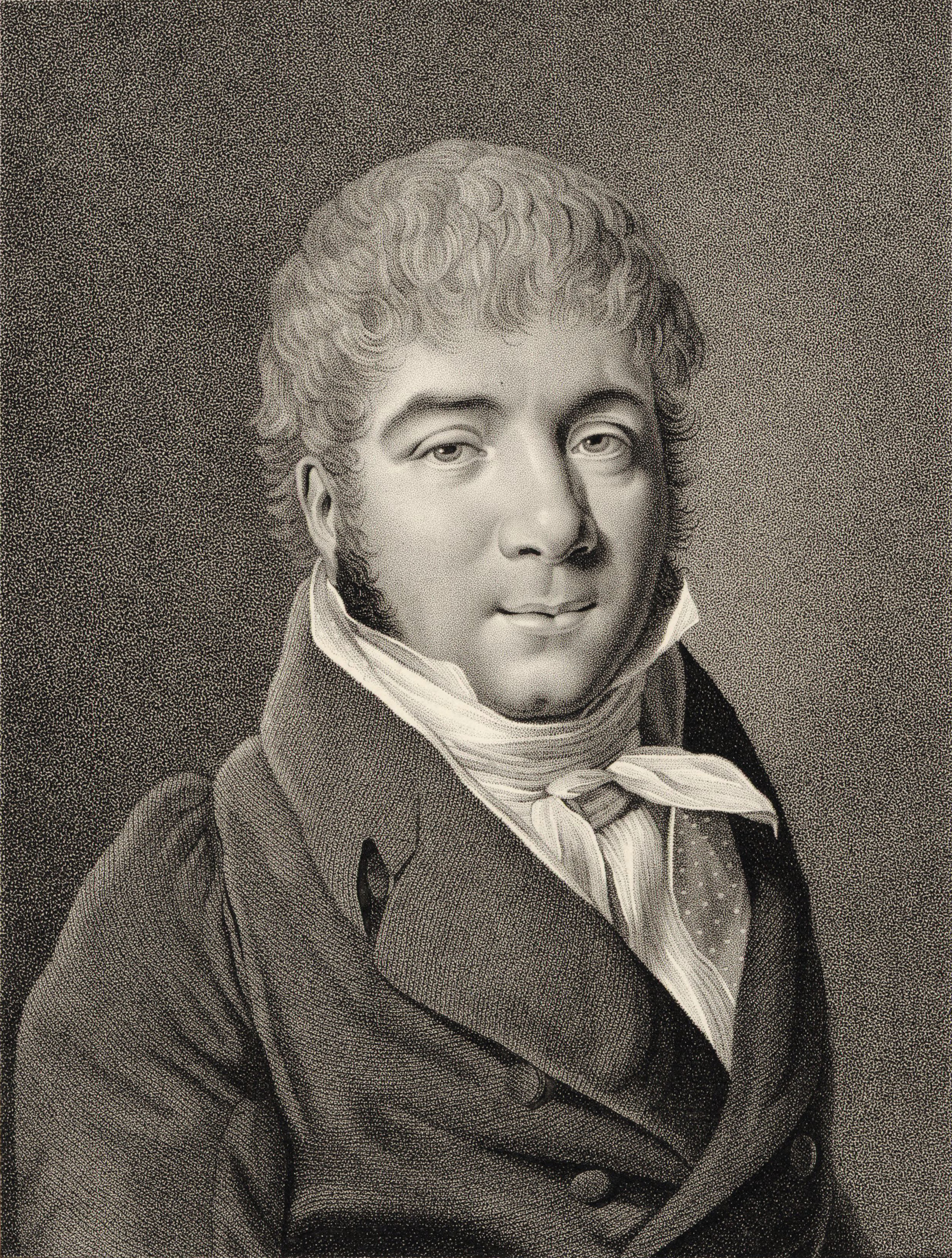

Jean-François Coulon (15 January 1774 - May 1836) was a French ballet dancer and instructor.

== Biography ==
Born in Paris, he had a career at the Opéra de Paris. He founded his school at the start of the 19th century and became one of the most renowned ballet teachers in Europe. Made professor of the "classe de perfectionnement" at the Opéra in 1807, his students included Geneviève Gosselin, Pauline Leroux, Louis Henry, Marie Quériau, Pauline Duvernay, Albert, Filippo Taglioni and above all Filippo's Marie. From 1810 he contributed to the development of the pointes technique.

His son Antoine-Louis Coulon (1796–1849) had a successful career at the Opéra de Paris (1816–1832) and at Her Majesty's Theatre in London, where he was a dancer and served as the latter's Director of Ballet (1836–1838) and Régisseur de la Danse (1842–1844). Antoine was officially the father of Georges Coulon.

== Bibliography ==
- Guest, Ivor Forbes (1972). The Romantic Ballet in England. Wesleyan University Press. ISBN 0-8195-4050-1.
- Guest, Ivor Forbes (2001). Ballet under Napoleon. Dance Books. ISBN 1-85273-082X.
