= Louis Duport =

French dancer, composer (1781–1853)

Louis-Antoine Duport (1781, Paris – 19 October 1853, Paris) was a French ballet dancer, ballet composer and ballet master.

== Life ==
Born in Paris, Duport studied dance under Jean-François Coulon and began his career on the Boulevards and at the Ambigu-Comique. He then made his debut at the Opéra de Paris in 1800, quickly becoming its premier danseur, with rivalries with Auguste Vestris as a dancer and with Pierre Gardel as a choreographer. He unilaterally broke his contract in 1808 and left Paris for Saint Petersburg, via Vienna.

At the Mariinsky Theatre, he danced in the ballets by Charles-Louis Didelot, in January 1812 he danced in Warsaw, before being made the head of a theatre in Naples and returning to Vienna as professor and director at the Theater am Kärntnertor. In 1824, he allowed Beethoven to premiere his Ninth Symphony. After the very successful first performance which took place on 7 May, Duport offered a second performance on 24 May where he suggested to Beethoven’s secretary Anton Schindler that one of the parts of Beethoven’s Missa solemnis be switched out to a desirable Rossini aria. From June to November 1837, he stayed in Warsaw with his Viennese student, prima ballerina Helene Schanzowsky, married name Grekowska.

== Later Life and Death ==
After spending many seasons in Paris, Saint-Petersburg, Naples, London, Turin, Vienna and Warsaw, he returned to Paris in 1837 and retired from artistic activity. He died in Paris.

== Works ==
- 1805: Acis et Galatée (Opéra de Paris)
- 1806: Figaro, with Jean-Baptiste Blache (Opéra de Paris)
- 1806: L'Hymen de Zéphyre (Opéra de Paris)
- 1808: Figaro (Vienna)
- 1808: Les Amours de Vénus et Adonis (Saint-Petersburg)
- 1808: Le Barbier de Séville, after Jean-Baptiste Blache (Saint-Petersburg)
- 1809: Le Jugement de Pâris, after Pierre Gardel (Saint-Petersburg)
- 1810: Les Troubadours (Saint-Petersburg)
- 1812: Narcisse amoureux de lui-même (Warsaw)
- 1812: Zephyr (Vienna)
- 1812: Die Spanische Abendunterhaltung (Vienna)
- 1812: Der Blöde Ritter (Vienna)
- 1813: Telemach auf der Insel Kalypso (Vienna)
- 1813: Der Ländliche Tag (Vienna)
- 1813: Die Maskerade (Vienna)
- 1813: Acis und Galatea (Vienna)
- 1813: Die Erziehung des Adonis (Vienna)
- 1814: La Fille mal gardée, after Jean Dauberval (Vienna)
- 1817: Le Virtu premiata (Naples)
- 1819: Adolphe et Mathilde (London)
- 1819: Les Six Ingénus (London)
- 1819: La Rose (London)
- 1831: L'Ottavino (Turin)
- 1837: Rycerz i wieszczka / La Fée et le Chevalier, after Armand Vestris (Warsaw)
- 1837: Mleczarka szwajcarska / La Laitière Suisse, after Filippo Taglioni (Warsaw)
