= Lise Noblet =

French ballet dancer

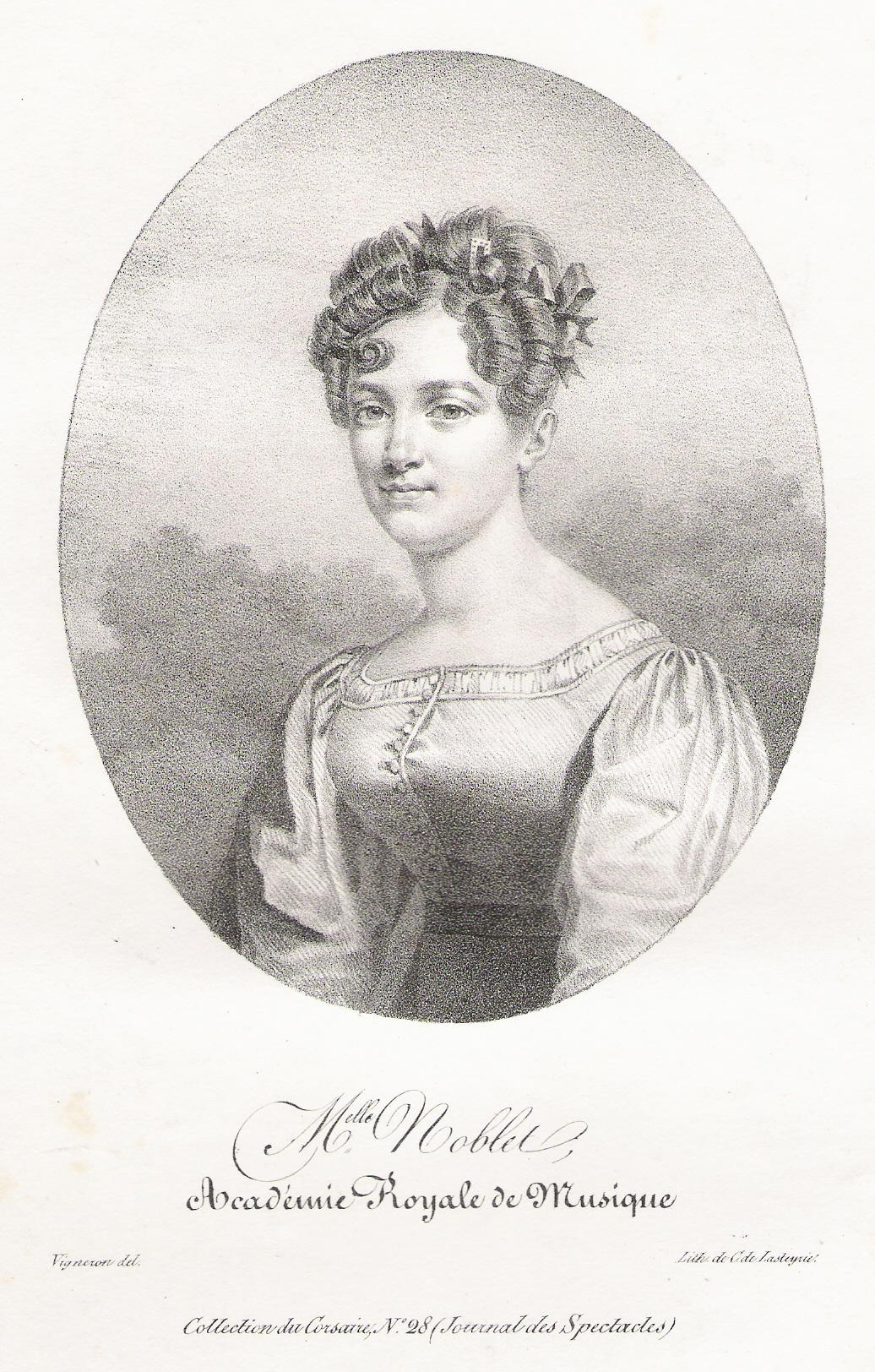
Lise Noblet (c 1835)

Marie-Élisabeth Noblet (24 November 1801 in Paris – September 1852 in Paris), known by her stage name of Lise Noblet, was a French ballet dancer. She débuted at the Paris Opera Ballet in 1819 in a pas de deux with Albert, then danced the principal roles in the ballets of Pierre Gardel. She left the Opéra in 1841 on the death of her faithful companion, général Claparède.

She created the title role of Fenella in the opera La muette de Portici by Daniel Auber. The role of Alphonse in that opera was created by Alexis Dupont, who married Lise Noblet's sister Félicité Noblet. She was also a ballerina, and appeared under her husband's name, Alexis Dupont.

== Biography ==
Marie Élisabeth Noblet was born in Paris on November 24, 1801, to Pierre Marie Noblet and his wife, Élisabeth Madeleine Antoinette Aumer.

Born into a family of artisans, several of whose children took to the stage, Élisabeth Noblet’s sisters included the actress Alexandrine Noblet and the ballerina Félicité Noblet (1807–1877), who married the tenor Alexis Dupont and was known by the stage name Madame Alexis.

Élisabeth, known as Lise Noblet, made her debut with the Paris Opera Ballet in 1819 in a pas de deux with Albert, and went on to dance the leading roles in Pierre Gardel ballets.

From 1821 to 1824, she gave several performances at the King's Theatre in London. Marie Taglioni arrival at the Paris Opera in 1827 pushed her into the background, leaving her with only the title role of Fenella in La muette de Portici in 1828.

A rival of Fanny Elssler in Spanish dances, she left the Opera in 1841 upon the death of her longtime companion, General Claparède.

Élisabeth Noblet died at her home in the Enclos des Ternes (then in Neuilly-sur-Seine) on August 27, 1852. She was buried the following day in a family vault at Père Lachaise Cemetery.

In 1864, a lawsuit pitted his testamentary heirs against one another in a Paris court.
