= His Majesty's Theatre, London =

West End theatre in London

His Majesty's Theatre
- Queen's Theatre; King's Theatre; Italian Opera House; Her Majesty's Theatre
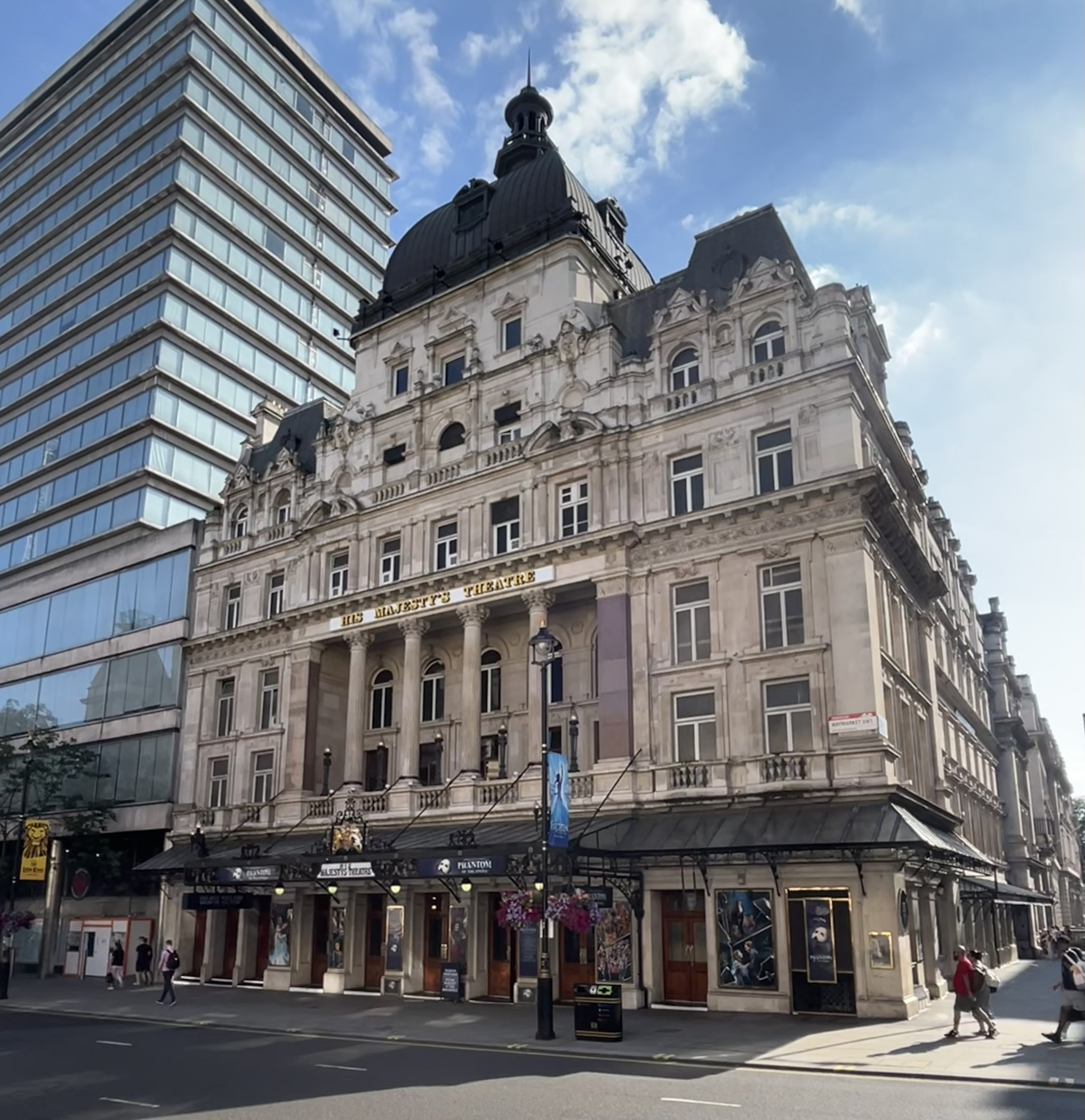
- Exterior of the theatre, 2023
- Interactive map of His Majesty's Theatre
- Address: Haymarket; London; United Kingdom
- Coordinates: 51.5081°N 0.1320°W
- Owner: LW Theatres (leased from the Crown Estate)
- Capacity: 1,216 on 4 levels
- Type: West End theatre
- Designation: Grade II*
- Production: The Phantom of the Opera
- Public transit: Piccadilly Circus

Construction
- Opened: 1897; 129 years ago
- Architect: Charles J. Phipps

Website
- lwtheatres.co.uk/theatres/his-majestys/

His Majesty's Theatre is a West End theatre situated in the Haymarket in the City of Westminster, London. The building, designed by Charles J. Phipps, was constructed in 1897 for the actor-manager Herbert Beerbohm Tree, who established the Royal Academy of Dramatic Art (RADA) at the theatre. In the early decades of the 20th century Tree produced spectacular productions of Shakespeare and other classical works, and the theatre hosted premieres by such playwrights as Bernard Shaw, J. M. Synge and, later, Noël Coward and J. B. Priestley. Since the First World War the wide stage has made the theatre suitable for large-scale musical productions, and His Majesty's has accordingly specialised in hosting musicals. It has been home to record-setting musical theatre runs such as the First World War hit Chu Chin Chow and Andrew Lloyd Webber's The Phantom of the Opera, which has run at His Majesty's since 1986, except during the COVID-19 pandemic theatre closures.

The first theatre on the site was established in 1705 by the architect and playwright John Vanbrugh as the Queen's Theatre. Legitimate drama unaccompanied by music was prohibited by law in all but the two London patent theatres, and the theatre quickly became an opera house. Between 1711 and 1739 more than 25 operas by George Frideric Handel premiered here. The theatre burnt down in 1789, and a new theatre was completed in 1791. Some of Joseph Haydn's series of concerts in London took place at the theatre in the 1790s. In the early 19th century the theatre was home to an opera company (which moved to the Theatre Royal, Covent Garden, in 1847) presenting the first London performances of Mozart's La clemenza di Tito, Così fan tutte and Don Giovanni. It also hosted the ballet of Her Majesty's Theatre in the mid-19th century, before returning to opera with the London premieres of such works as Bizet's Carmen and Wagner's Ring cycle. A third building was constructed in 1868.

The theatre's capacity is 1,216 seats, and the building was Grade II* listed by English Heritage in 1970. LW Theatres has owned the building since 2000. The land beneath it is on a long-term lease from the Crown Estate. The name of the theatre changes with the gender of the monarch. Throughout the reign of Queen Victoria it was called Her Majesty's Theatre, changing to His Majesty's on the accession of Edward VII in 1901. In 1952 the theatre again became Her Majesty's on the accession of Elizabeth II. On 6 May 2023, the name reverted to His Majesty's Theatre following the accession of Charles III the previous year.

== Background ==
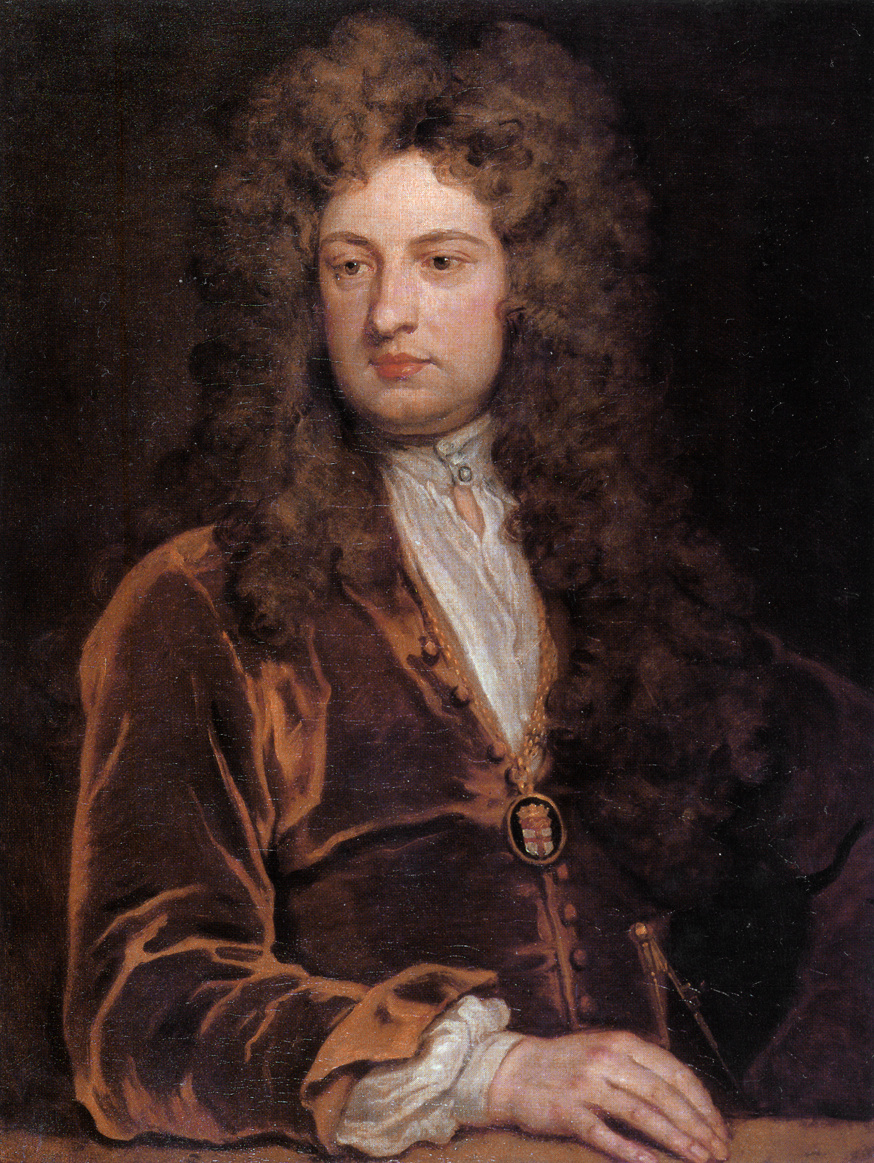
John Vanbrugh painted by Godfrey Kneller, c. 1704–1710

There have been four theatres on the site, at the junction of the Haymarket and Charles II Street in the West End of London. The first opened as the Queen's Theatre on 9 April 1705. In the late 17th century there were two patent theatre companies, who were the only performers permitted by law to stage plays without music. They had been brought together as the United Company at the Theatre Royal, Drury Lane, built in 1663, but there were continual disagreements between the actors and their manager, Christopher Rich. In 1695 some of the actors broke away and set up a rival company at the Lincoln's Inn Fields Theatre, managed by Thomas Betterton. The company did not prosper at that theatre, and in 1703 the dramatist and architect John Vanbrugh acquired a former stable yard, at a cost of £2,000, for the construction of a new theatre in the Haymarket. He was joined in the enterprise by his principal associate and manager William Congreve and Betterton's company. To build the theatre, Vanbrugh raised the money by subscription, possibly among members of the Kit-Cat Club. According to Colley Cibber:

To recover them [Betterton's company], therefore, to their due Estimation, a new Project was form'd of building them a stately theatre in the Hay-Market, by Sir John Vanbrugh, for which he raised a Subscription of thirty Persons of Quality, at one hundred Pounds each, in Consideration whereof every Subscriber, for his own Life, was to be admitted to whatever Entertainments should be publickly perform'd there, without farther Payment for his Entrance.

== Vanbrugh's theatre: 1705–1789 ==
The land for the theatre was held on a lease renewable in 1740; the freeholder was, and remains, the Crown Estate. Building was delayed by the necessity of acquiring the street frontage, and a three-bay entrance led to a brick shell 130 feet (39.6 m) long and 60 feet (18.3 m) wide. Cibber described the audience fittings as lavish but the facilities for playing poor.

Vanbrugh and Congreve received Queen Anne's authority to form a Company of Comedians on 14 December 1704, and the theatre opened as the Queen's Theatre in April 1705 with imported Italian singers in Gli amori d'Ergasto (The Loves of Ergasto), a pastoral opera by Jakob Greber, with an epilogue by Congreve. This was the first opera sung in Italian in London. Later in the season Vanbrugh presented a comedy, (Note: Although only two companies had been licensed to perform plays without music, this restriction was frequently challenged, and its enforcement was intermittently lax. According to the historian Matthew Kinservik: "While spoken drama was technically limited to the patent houses, other venues began to stretch the boundaries.") The Confederacy, in which Thomas Doggett, later known for Doggett's Coat and Badge, scored one of his greatest successes, but overall, the season was a failure. The theatre proved too large for actors' voices to carry across the auditorium: according to a contemporary account, "the convenience of a good theatre has been sacrificed to exhibit a triumphal piece of architecture ... not one word can be distinctly heard". Another obstacle to success was that in the early 18th century the new theatre was too far from the homes of its potential patrons. Cibber commented that the City, the Inns of Court, and the middle part of the town, from which much of the clientele of theatres came, were not within easy walking distance, and for those in the cheaper seats, "Coach hire is often too hard a Tax upon the Pit and the Gallery". (Note: The pit was the section behind the rear of the stalls; the gallery contained the topmost tier of the auditorium, farthest from the stage. Both offered cheap seats on hard benches for the less wealthy theatregoers.)

Congreve departed and Vanbrugh bought out his other partners. As he became progressively more involved in the construction of Blenheim Palace, his management of the theatre became increasingly chaotic, showing "numerous signs of confusion, inefficiency, missed opportunities, and bad judgement". In May 1707, experiencing mounting losses and running costs, he sold a fourteen-year lease on the theatre to Owen Swiny and gave up active management of the theatre. The theatre was not licensed to present non-musical plays, and in 1708 the authorities enforced that provision. The actors moved to the Theatre Royal, Drury Lane, and Queen's Theatre concentrated on opera.

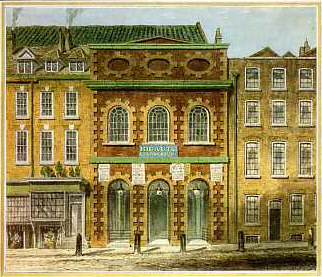
The King's Theatre, Haymarket; watercolour by William Capon

Some performances of plays at Queen's were licensed in 1709 by the Lord Chamberlain, and the theatre's acoustics were altered to better support drama. After 1709, however, the theatre was devoted to Italian opera and was sometimes referred to as the Haymarket Opera House. The young George Frideric Handel made his English début with his opera Rinaldo, on 24 February 1711 at the theatre, featuring the two leading castrato singers of the era, Nicolo Grimaldi and Valentino Urbani. This was the first Italian opera composed specifically for the London stage. The work was well received, achieving a run, substantial for the time, of fifteen performances. Handel immediately became the most popular composer in London, but he left soon after the close of the opera season in June 1711 to take up an appointment in Hanover. Losses at the Queen's Theatre continued, and Swiny fled abroad to escape his creditors. John James Heidegger took over the management of the theatre and, from 1719, began to extend the stage through arches into the houses to the south of the theatre. A "Royal Academy of Music" was formed by subscription from wealthy sponsors, including the Prince of Wales, to support Handel's productions at the theatre. Under this sponsorship Handel conducted a series of more than twenty-five of his original operas, continuing until 1739. (Note: See List of operas by George Frideric Handel for full details of performance of Handel operas at the Queen's and King's Theatre. There were a first and second Royal Academy of Music, directed by Handel, each formed for a limited period. From 1734 the second academy had to contend with the rival Opera of the Nobility. These academies are not related to the modern Royal Academy of Music, founded in 1822.) Handel was a partner in the management with Heidegger from 1729 to 1734, and he contributed incidental music for the theatre, including that for a revival of Ben Jonson's The Alchemist, opening on 14 January 1710.

On the accession of George I in 1714 the theatre was renamed the King's Theatre (and remained so named during the succession of male monarchs who occupied the throne until 1837). The two patent theatres remained the only ones permitted to perform dramas unaccompanied by music in London, and lacking letters patent, the theatre remained associated with opera. In 1762 Johann Christian Bach travelled to London to premiere three operas at the theatre, including Orione on 19 February 1763. This established his reputation in England, and he became music master to Queen Charlotte.

=== Sheridan ===
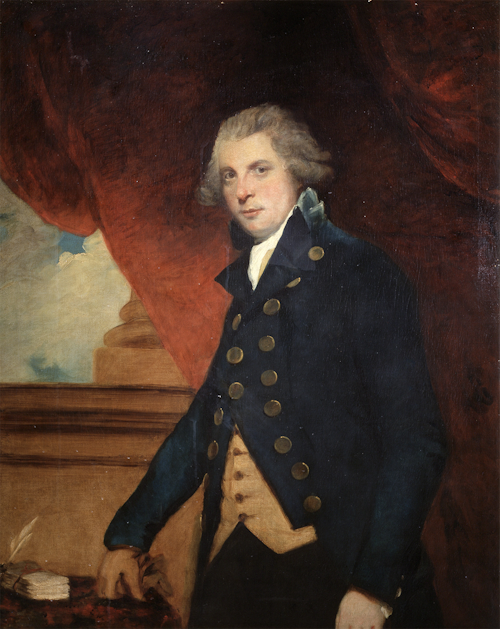
Richard Brinsley Sheridan, painted by Joshua Reynolds

In 1778 the lease for the theatre was transferred from James Brook to Thomas Harris, stage manager of the Theatre Royal, Covent Garden, and to the playwright Richard Brinsley Sheridan for £22,000. They paid for the remodelling of the interior by Robert Adam in the same year. In November 1778, The Morning Chronicle reported that Harris and Sheridan had:

... at a considerable expence, almost entirely new built the audience part of the house, and made a great variety of alterations, part of which are calculated for the rendering the theatre more light, elegant and pleasant, and part for the ease and convenience of the company. The sides of the frontispiece are decorated with two figures painted by Gainsborough, which are remarkably picturesque and beautiful; the heavy columns which gave the house so gloomy an aspect that it rather resembled a large mausoleum or a place for funeral dirges, than a theatre, are removed.

The expense of the improvements was not matched by the box office receipts, and the partnership dissolved; Sheridan took a mortgage on the theatre of £12,000 from the banker Henry Hoare to buy out his partner.

One member of the company, Giovanni Gallini, had made his début at the theatre in 1753 and had risen to the position of dancing master, gaining an international reputation. He had tried to buy Harris's share but had been rebuffed. He now purchased the mortgage. Sheridan quickly became bankrupt after placing the financial affairs of the theatre in the hands of William Taylor, a lawyer. The next few years saw a struggle for control of the theatre and Taylor bought Sheridan's interest in 1781. In 1782 the theatre was remodelled by Michael Novosielski, formerly a scene painter at the theatre. In May 1783 Taylor was arrested by his creditors, and a forced sale ensued, at which Harris purchased the lease and much of the effects. Further legal action transferred the interests in the theatre to a board of trustees, including Novosielski. The trustees acted with a flagrant disregard for the needs of the theatre or other creditors, seeking only to enrich themselves, and in August 1785 the Lord Chamberlain took over the running of the enterprise, in the interests of the creditors. Gallini, meanwhile, had become manager. In 1788 the Lord Chancellor observed "that there appeared in all the proceedings respecting this business, a wish of distressing the property, and that it would probably be consumed in that very court to which ... [the interested parties] seemed to apply for relief". Performances suffered, with the box receipts taken by Novosielski, rather than given to Gallini to run the house. Money continued to be squandered on endless litigation or was misappropriated. Gallini tried to keep the theatre going, but he was forced to employ amateur performers. The World described a performance: "... the Dance, if such it can be called was like the movements of heavy Cavalry. It was hissed very abundantly". On another occasion Gallini had to defend himself against a dissatisfied audience who charged the stage and destroyed the fittings, as the company ran for their lives.

=== Fire ===
The theatre burnt down on 17 June 1789 during evening rehearsals, and the dancers fled the building as beams fell on the stage. The fire had been deliberately set on the roof, and Gallini offered a reward of £300 for capture of the culprit. With the theatre destroyed, each group laid its own plans for a replacement. Gallini obtained a licence from the Lord Chamberlain to perform opera at the nearby Little Theatre, and he entered into a partnership with R. B. O'Reilly to obtain land in Leicester Fields for a new building, which would require another licence. The two quarrelled, and each planned to wrest control of the venture from the other. The authorities refused to grant either of them a patent for Leicester Fields, but O'Reilly was granted a licence for four years to present opera at the Oxford Street Pantheon (which burned to the ground in 1792). Meanwhile, Taylor reached an agreement with the creditors of the King's Theatre and attempted to buy the remainder of the lease from Edward Vanbrugh, but this was now promised to O'Reilly. A further complication arose as the theatre needed to expand into adjacent land that now came into the possession of a Taylor supporter. The scene was set for a further war of attrition between the lessees, but at this point O'Reilly's first season at the Pantheon failed miserably, and he fled to Paris to avoid his creditors.

By 1720 Vanbrugh's direct connection with the theatre had been terminated, but the leases and rents had been transferred to both his own family and that of his wife's through a series of trusts and benefices. After the fire the Vanbrugh family's long association with the theatre was terminated, and all their leases were surrendered by 1792.

== Second theatre: 1791–1867 ==
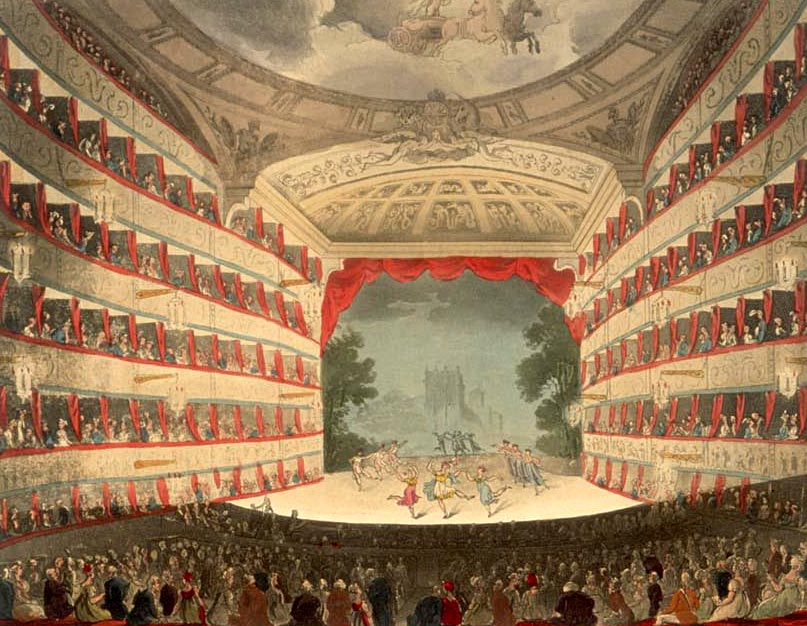
Interior of second theatre on the site, c. 1808 (drawing by Auguste Pugin and Thomas Rowlandson for Ackermann's Microcosm of London)

Taylor completed a new theatre on the site in 1791. According to the theatre historians Mander and Mitchenson: "it was at the time the largest theatre in England; it was generally regarded as one of the most resplendent theatres in the world". Novosielski had again been chosen as architect for the theatre on an enlarged site; the building was described by Malcolm in 1807 as

fronted by a stone basement in rustic work, with the commencement of a very superb building of the Doric order, consisting of three pillars, two windows, an entablature, pediment, and balustrade. This, if it had been continued, would have contributed considerably to the splendour of London; but the unlucky fragment is fated to stand as a foil to the vile and absurd edifice of brick pieced to it, which I have not patience to describe.

The Lord Chamberlain, a supporter of O'Reilly, refused a performing licence to Taylor. The theatre opened on 26 March 1791 with a private performance of song and dance entertainment, but it was not allowed to open to the public. The new theatre was heavily indebted and spanned separate plots of land that were leased to Taylor by four different owners on differing terms. As a later manager of the theatre wrote, "In the history of property, there has probably been no parallel instance wherein the legal labyrinth has been so difficult to thread." Meetings were held at Carlton House and Bedford House attempting to reconcile the parties. On 24 August 1792 a General Opera Trust Deed was signed by the parties. The general management of the theatre was to be entrusted to a committee of noblemen, appointed by the Prince of Wales, who would then appoint a general manager. Funds would be disbursed from the profits to compensate the creditors of both the King's Theatre and the Pantheon. The committee never met, and management devolved to Taylor.

=== William Taylor ===
The first public performance of opera in the new house was on 26 January 1793, the dispute with the Lord Chamberlain over the licence having been settled. The King's Theatre became the home of the Theatre Royal, Drury Lane company while its theatre was being rebuilt.

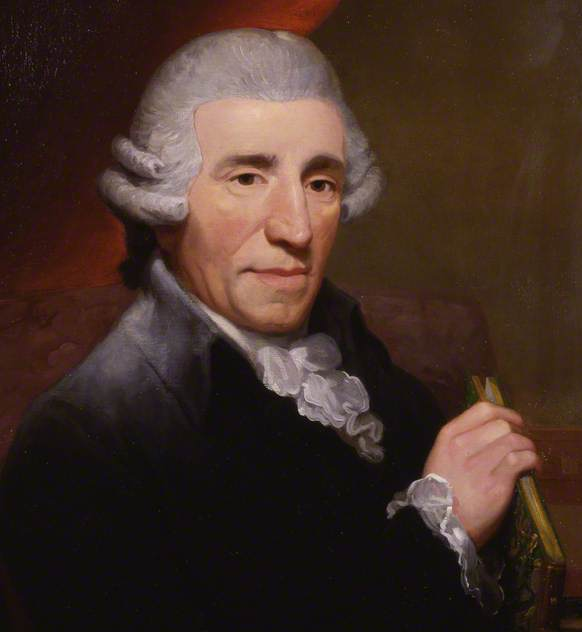
Joseph Haydn in 1792 by Thomas Hardy

From 1793 seven small houses at the east side of the theatre fronting on the Haymarket were demolished and replaced by a large concert room attached to the theatre. It was in this room that Joseph Haydn gave a series of concerts, in association with the impresario Johann Peter Salomon, on his second visit to London in 1794–95. For this second London season he conducted the last six of his 104 symphonies. The final three were premiered at the concert room of the King's Theatre. During the performance of one of them, No. 102, a chandelier fell from the ceiling and crashed into the auditorium below. There were no serious injuries, and there were shouts of "miracle, miracle" from the audience. (Note: The resulting nickname "the Miracle Symphony" became mistakenly attached to No. 96 rather than the one during which the supposed miracle had occurred.)

With the departure of the Drury Lane company in 1794 the theatre returned to opera, hosting the first London performances of Mozart's La clemenza di Tito in 1806, Così fan tutte and The Magic Flute in 1811, and Don Giovanni in 1816. Between 1816 and 1818, John Nash and George Repton made alterations to the façade and increased the capacity of the auditorium to 2,500. They also added a shopping arcade, called the Royal Opera Arcade, which has survived fires and renovations and still exists. It runs along the rear of the theatre. Between 1818 and 1820 the British premieres of Gioachino Rossini's operas Il barbiere di Siviglia, Elisabetta, regina d'Inghilterra, L'italiana in Algeri, La Cenerentola and Tancredi took place in the theatre.

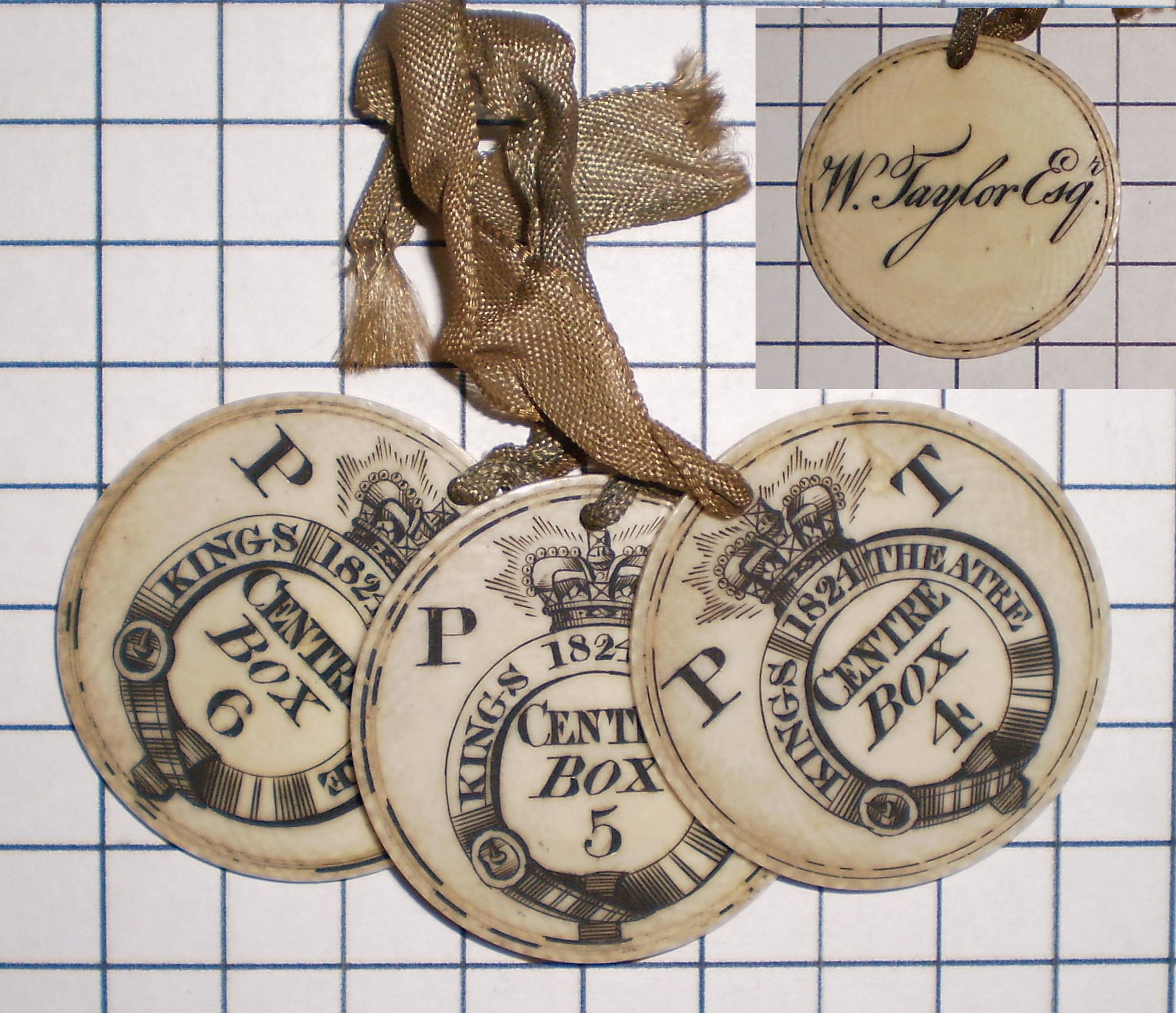
Season tickets for 1824 season at King's Theatre

In 1797 Taylor was elected as member of Parliament for Leominster, a position that gave him immunity from his creditors. When that parliament dissolved in 1802 he fled to France. Later he returned, and was member of Parliament for Barnstaple from 1806 to 1812 while continuing his association with the theatre.

=== John Ebers ===
John Ebers, a bookseller, took over the management of the theatre in 1821, and seven more London premieres of Rossini operas (La gazza ladra, Il turco in Italia, Mosè in Egitto, Otello, La donna del lago, Matilde di Shabran and Ricciardo e Zoraide) took place there in the following three years. Ebers sublet the theatre to Giambattista Benelli in 1824, and Rossini was invited to conduct, remaining for a five-month season, with his wife Isabella Colbran performing. Two more of his operas, Zelmira and Semiramide, received their British premieres during the season, but there was public complaint about Rossini's failure to provide a new opera, as promised. Benelli had defaulted on his contract and absconded without paying either the composer or the artists, but this was not known to the London press and public, who blamed Rossini.

Ebers engaged Giuditta Pasta for the 1825 season, but he became involved in lawsuits which, combined with a large increase in the rent of the theatre, forced him into bankruptcy, after which he returned to his bookselling business.

=== Pierre François Laporte ===
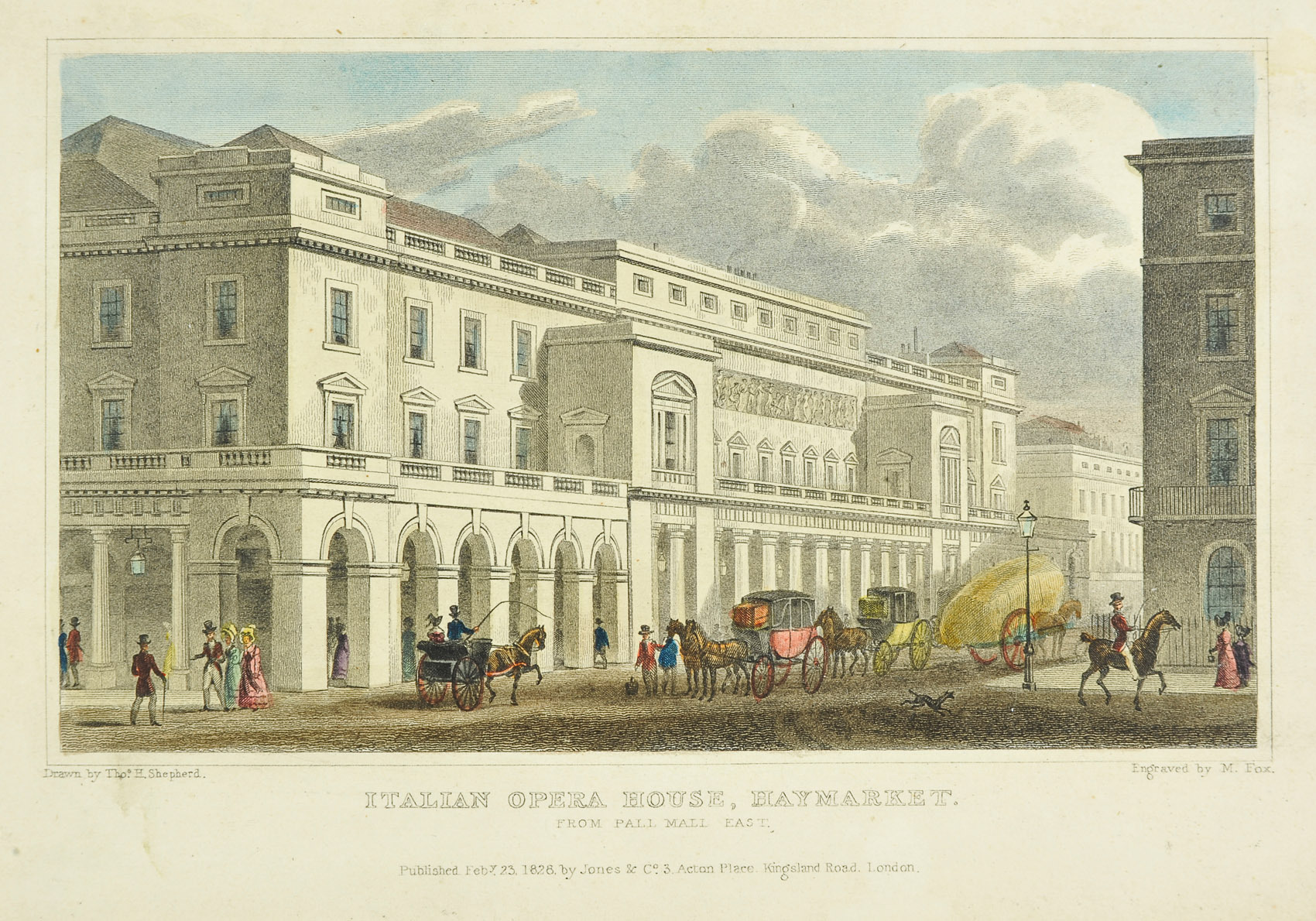
Drawing of the theatre by Thomas Hosmer Shepherd, 1827–1828

In 1828 Ebers was succeeded as theatre manager by Pierre François Laporte, who held the position (with a brief gap in 1831–1833) until his death in 1841. Two of Rossini's Paris operas (Le comte Ory and Le siège de Corinthe) had their British premieres at the theatre during this period, and Laporte was also the first to introduce the operas of Vincenzo Bellini (La sonnambula, Norma and I puritani) and Gaetano Donizetti (Anna Bolena, Lucia di Lammermoor and Lucrezia Borgia) to the British public. Under Laporte singers such as Giulia Grisi, Pauline Viardot, Giovanni Battista Rubini, Luigi Lablache and Mario made their London stage débuts at the theatre. Among the musical directors of this period was Nicolas Bochsa, the celebrated and eccentric French harpist. He was appointed in 1827 and remained for six years at this position.

When Queen Victoria ascended the throne in 1837 the name of the theatre was changed to Her Majesty's Italian Opera House. In the same year Samuel Phelps made his London début as Shylock in The Merchant of Venice at the theatre, also playing in other Shakespearean plays there. In 1863 Robert Browning's Colombe's Birthday played at the theatre. The Morning Post described it as "a delicate wreath of poetic flowers", too subtle for theatregoers accustomed to coarser offerings, and it was not a success.

In 1841 disputes arose over Laporte's decision to replace the baritone Antonio Tamburini with a new singer, Colletti. The audience stormed the stage, and the performers formed "a revolutionary conspiracy". A London newspaper described the incident as "one of the most disgraceful scenes that ever occurred within the walls of any theatre".

=== Benjamin Lumley ===
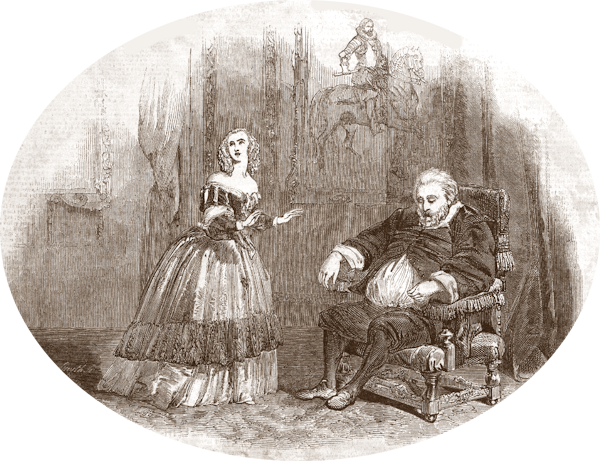
Premiere of I masnadieri, Her Majesty's, 1847, with Jenny Lind and Luigi Lablache

Laporte died suddenly, and Benjamin Lumley took over the management in 1842, introducing London audiences to Donizetti's late operas, Don Pasquale and La fille du régiment. Initially, relations were good between Lumley and Michael Costa, the principal conductor at Her Majesty's, but they later deteriorated. Verdi's Ernani, and Nabucco, and I Lombardi received their British premieres in 1845–46, and Lumley commissioned I masnadieri from the composer. It received its world premiere on 22 July 1847, with the Swedish diva Jenny Lind in the star role of Amalia. The British premieres of two more Verdi operas, I due Foscari and Attila, followed in 1847–48. Lind's success was so great that it became known as "Lind mania", but other performers felt neglected, and disputes continued. In 1847 Costa finally transferred his opera company to the Theatre Royal, Covent Garden; the law allowing only the patent companies to perform straight plays had been repealed in 1843, and although opera continued to be an important part of the repertoire at Her Majesty's, a wider range of productions was now possible.

Lind's retirement from opera in 1849 was a blow to Lumley, but the appearance of the Cuban singer Donna Maria Martinez at the theatre in July 1850 was the subject of much attention from the press. She was dubbed "the Black Malibran" and was "vehemently applauded and encouraged", but she did not prove a sustained draw, and the highlight of the 1850 season was the premiere of Halévy's Shakespearean opera La Tempesta. The critics were moderately impressed by the music, though there was some regret that Mendelssohn had not lived to compose the work, as originally planned; the audiences were enthusiastic, and there was tumultuous applause for the composer, librettist, stars, conductor and impresario.

Mander and Mitchenson describe 1851 as "the last season of operatic prosperity for Her Majesty's". The orchestra seceded to Covent Garden in 1852 and the theatre closed until 1856, when a fire shut down its rival. After the reopening of Her Majesty's Lumley presented two more British premieres of Verdi operas: La traviata in 1856 and Luisa Miller in 1858.

=== Ballet ===
Ballet played an important part at Her Majesty's in the mid-19th century. From the early 1830s until the late 1840s the theatre was known for staging romantic ballet. The celebrated ballet master Jules Perrot began staging ballet at Her Majesty's in 1830. Lumley appointed him Premier Maître de Ballet (chief choreographer) to the theatre in 1842. The ballet historian Ivor Guest writes, "probably never before or since has there been a more brilliant period in the history of the ballet than those years when [Perrot] was ballet-master at Her Majesty's Theatre". Among the ballets he staged were Ondine, ou La Naïade (1843), La Esmeralda (1844), and Catarina, ou La Fille du Bandit (1846), as well as the celebrated divertissement Pas de Quatre (1845). Other ballet masters created works for the ballet of Her Majesty's throughout the period of the romantic ballet, most notably Paul Taglioni (son of Filippo Taglioni), who staged ballets including Coralia, ou Le Chevalier inconstant (1847) and Electra (1849, the first production of a ballet to make use of electric lighting).

The Italian composer Cesare Pugni was appointed "Composer of the Ballet Music" to the theatre in 1843, a position created for him by Lumley. Between 1843 and 1850 he wrote the music for most of the new ballets presented at the theatre. Throughout the era of the romantic ballet the theatre presented performances by celebrated ballerinas, including Fanny Cerrito, Fanny Elssler, Lucile Grahn, Carlotta Grisi, Lola Montez and Marie Taglioni.

=== J. H. Mapleson ===
1867 fire destroying the theatre

From 1862 to 1867 the theatre was managed by J. H. Mapleson. He presented Italian, French and German opera, including the British premieres of La forza del destino, Médée, Faust, Orpheus in the Underworld and The Merry Wives of Windsor, and promoted such singers as Mario, Giulia Grisi, De Murska, Thérèse Tietjens, Antonio Giuglini, Charles Santley and Christine Nilsson.

On the night of 6 December 1867 the theatre was destroyed by fire, thought to have been caused by an overheated stove. Only the bare walls of the theatre remained, and most of the adjacent shops in Pall Mall, and the Clergy Club hotel in Charles Street (now called Charles II Street), suffered damage of varying severity. After the destruction of the theatre Mapleson took his company to the Theatre Royal, Drury Lane.

== Third theatre: 1868–1896 ==
A third building was constructed in 1868 at a cost of £50,000, within the shell of the old theatre, for Lord Dudley. It was designed by Charles Lee and Sons and their partner, William Pain, and built by George Trollope and Sons. The designers had taken over John Nash's practice on his retirement. The new theatre was designed to be less susceptible to fire, with brick firewalls, iron roof trusses and Dennett's patent gypsum-cement floors. The auditorium had four tiers, with a stage large enough for the greatest spectaculars. For opera, the theatre seated 1,890, and for plays, with the orchestra pit removed, 2,500. As a result of a dispute over the rent between Dudley and Mapleson, and a decline in the popularity of ballet, the theatre remained dark until 1874, when it was sold to a Revivalist Christian movement.

Mapleson returned to Her Majesty's in 1877 and 1878, after a disastrous attempt to build a 2,000-seat National Opera House on a site subsequently used for the building of Scotland Yard. All the fittings of the theatre had been removed, including the seats, carpets and even the wallpaper. £6,000 was spent on fitting out the theatre, and on 28 April 1877 it returned to theatrical use with a revival of Bellini's opera Norma. The London premiere of Bizet's Carmen was given at the theatre on 22 June 1878, and the house hosted the Carl Rosa Opera Company in seasons from 1879 to 1882.

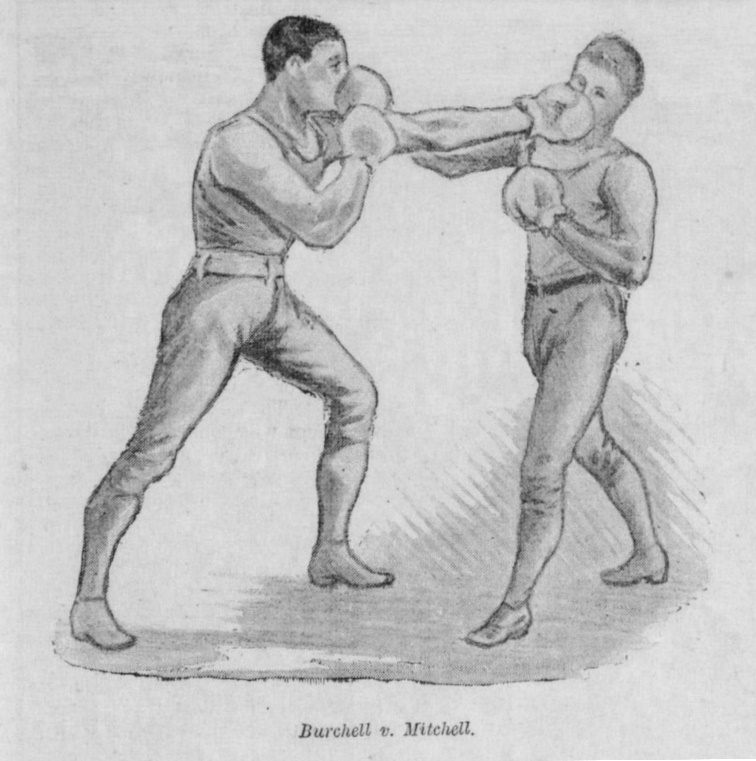
Boxing tournament at Her Majesty's, 1888, drawn by Louis Wain

Haverly's United Mastodon Minstrels played a season in 1880; a dramatisation of Uncle Tom's Cabin was seen in 1882; and the first complete performances in England of Richard Wagner's Der Ring des Nibelungen were given at Her Majesty's in 1882. The tetralogy was presented twice: the first cycle was well attended, the second less so. The Musical Times congratulated the impresario Angelo Neumann on his enterprise in staging the cycle, but regretfully predicted a substantial financial loss for the production.

Sarah Bernhardt appeared at the theatre in La dame aux camelias in 1886. Mapleson returned in 1887 and 1889, but The Times observed that his repertoire comprised "works that had long ceased to attract a large public, the singers were exclusively of second-rate quality, and the standard of performance was extremely low". Mander and Mitchenson comment that in 1889 the house was even the scene of a boxing tournament. Over Christmas seasons pantomimes were staged; after one such – Cinderella, starring Minnie Palmer – the theatre closed in 1890. Its owners were insolvent and the courts ordered the sale of the building and its contents. One of the last things seen in the third theatre was another season by Bernhardt, in which she appeared as Joan of Arc in a play by Jules Barbier, and as Marguerite in a revival of La dame aux camelias.

With the rapid advances in theatre technology made since the 1860s, the third theatre quickly became outmoded, and the sub-lease of the theatre, still held by the Dudley family, was due to expire in 1891. The Commissioners of Woods, Forests and Land Revenues (forerunners of the Crown Estate) desired the entire block on which the theatre stood to be rebuilt, except for the Royal Arcade, where the lease did not expire until 1912. Problems were encountered in obtaining all the buildings and in financing the scheme, but the theatre and surrounding buildings were demolished in 1892. When the demolition of the building was about to begin The Times commented:

It is not fitting to dwell on the decay of a fine institution, and it is better to recall the magnificent series of operas from Rinaldo to Der Ring des Nibelungen which have been presented for the first time in England at the house in the Haymarket during its 180 years of active existence.

== Fourth theatre: 1897–present ==
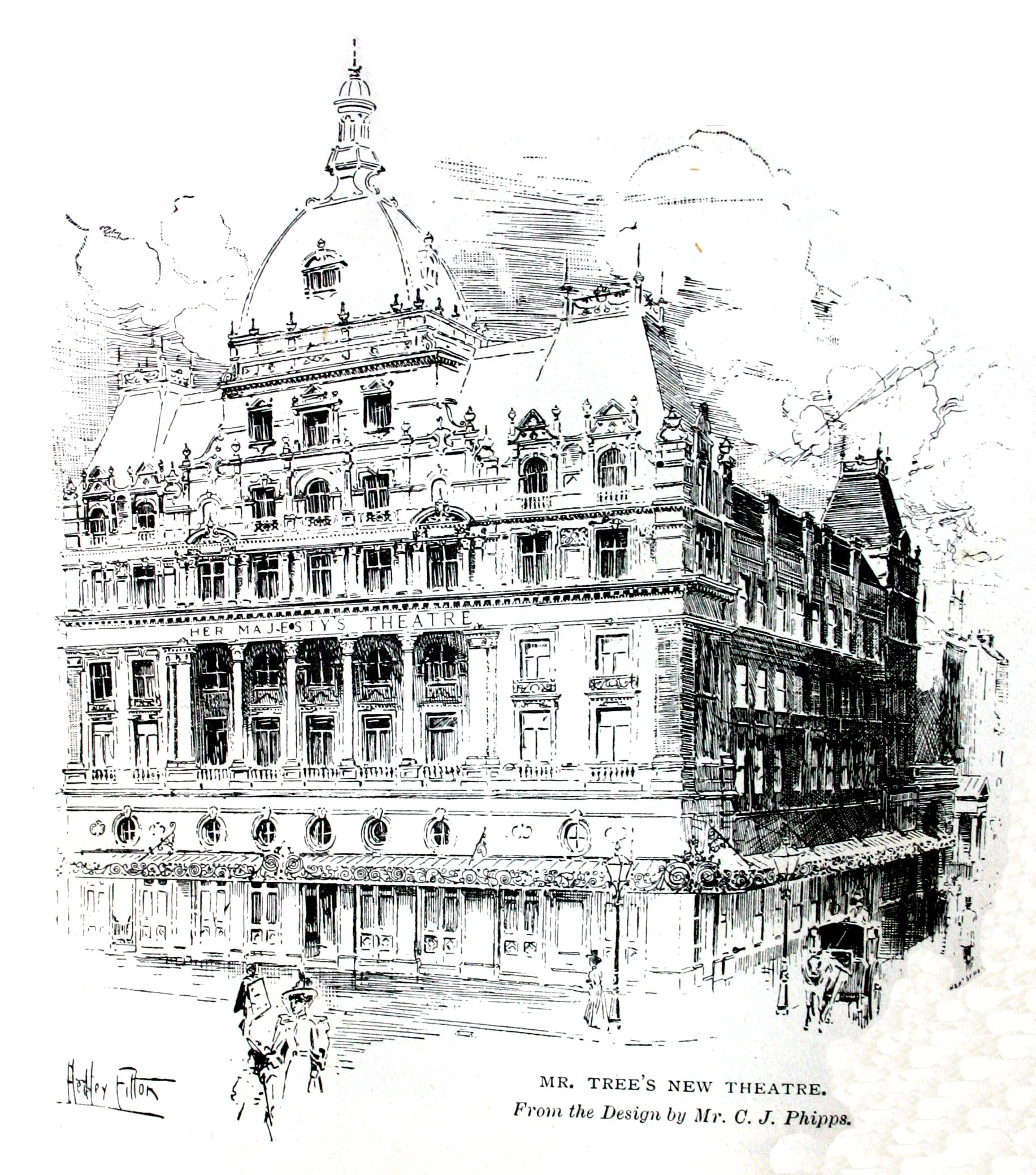
Phipps's new theatre

Plans were commissioned from the architect Charles J. Phipps for a theatre and a hotel. In February 1896 an agreement was reached with the actor-manager Herbert Beerbohm Tree for the erection of the theatre at an estimated cost of £55,000. Provisional plans were submitted in March 1896 and approved in February 1897; meanwhile, on 16 July 1896 the foundation stone of the new theatre was laid. The theatre opened in April 1897. Phipps died the following month; the theatre was his last work. After the death of Queen Victoria in 1901, the theatre's name reverted to His Majesty's Theatre.

=== Architecture ===
The theatre was designed as a symmetrical pair with the Carlton Hotel and restaurant on the adjacent site. The frontage formed three parts, each of three bays. The hotel occupied two parts, the theatre one, and the two buildings were unified by a cornice above the ground floor. The buildings rose to four storeys, with attic floors above, surmounted by large squared domes in a style inspired by the French Renaissance. The theatre has a Corinthian colonnade at the first floor, rising to the second, forming a loggia in front of the circle foyer. This is above a canopy over the main ground floor entrances. The theatre lies on an east–west axis. The stage at the western end was 49 feet (14.9 m) deep and 69.5 feet (21.2 m) wide, reputedly the first British stage to be flat, rather than raked.

The interior of the new theatre was designed by the consulting architect, W. H. Romaine-Walker, in a style drawing on that of the Royal Opera of Versailles by Gabriel. The stalls and pit were entered at ground level, with two partly cantilevered tiers above accommodating dress and family circles on the first level, and upper circle, amphitheatre and gallery on the tier above. In all, there were 1,319 seats. Contemporary opinion was critical of the project. Edwin Sachs wrote in his 1897 guide to theatres, "The treatment is considered to be in the French Renaissance style and stone has been used throughout. The detail cannot, however, be termed satisfactory, nor does the exterior architecturally express the purpose of the building."

Later opinion of the theatre has been more favourable: English Heritage describes the building as both Phipps's finest work and one of the best planned theatres in London. The building was Grade II* listed in January 1970. The adjacent hotel was severely damaged by bombing in the Second World War and was demolished in 1957–58, replaced by the new High Commission for New Zealand (New Zealand House), completed in 1963 (now, like the theatre, a Grade II listed building). The 200-year-old Royal Opera Arcade, built by Nash and Repton, is all that survives of the second theatre and is one of the earliest examples of a London arcade.

=== Performance ===
Herbert Beerbohm Tree as Cardinal Wolsey at the theatre, in a 1910 photograph

The current theatre opened on 28 April 1897. Tree built the theatre with profits from his tremendous success at the Haymarket Theatre, and he owned, managed and lived in the theatre from its construction until his death in 1917. For his personal use, he had a banqueting hall and living room installed in the massive, central, square French-style dome.

The theatre opened with a dramatisation of Gilbert Parker's The Seats of the Mighty. Adaptations of novels by Dickens, Tolstoy, and others formed a substantial part of the repertoire, along with classical works by Molière and others. Tree presented the world premiere of J. M. Synge's The Tinker's Wedding, and the British premiere of Bernard Shaw's Pygmalion, in which he starred with Mrs Patrick Campbell, in 1914. Above all, Tree was known for his Shakespeare productions. His longest-running of these was Henry VIII, which had a record-breaking run of 254 consecutive performances from September 1910 to April 1911. His biographer B. A. Kachur writes:

Most of the Shakespeare revivals at Her Majesty's enjoyed equally unprecedented runs. Tree succeeded in popularizing Shakespeare with his audiences because he staged the plays in ways that appealed to spectators' taste for elaborate spectacle and realistic scenery and scenic effects.

His Majesty's no longer specialised in opera, but there were occasional operatic presentations in its early years, including seasons given by the conductor Thomas Beecham, in which the British premiere of Richard Strauss's Ariadne auf Naxos was presented, as well as revivals – then rare – of Mozart's operas, Die Entführung aus dem Serail and Così fan tutte.

In 1904 Tree founded the Academy of Dramatic Art (later RADA), which spent a year based in the theatre before moving in 1905 to Gower Street in Bloomsbury. Tree continued to take graduates of the Academy into his company at His Majesty's, employing some forty actors in this way by 1911.

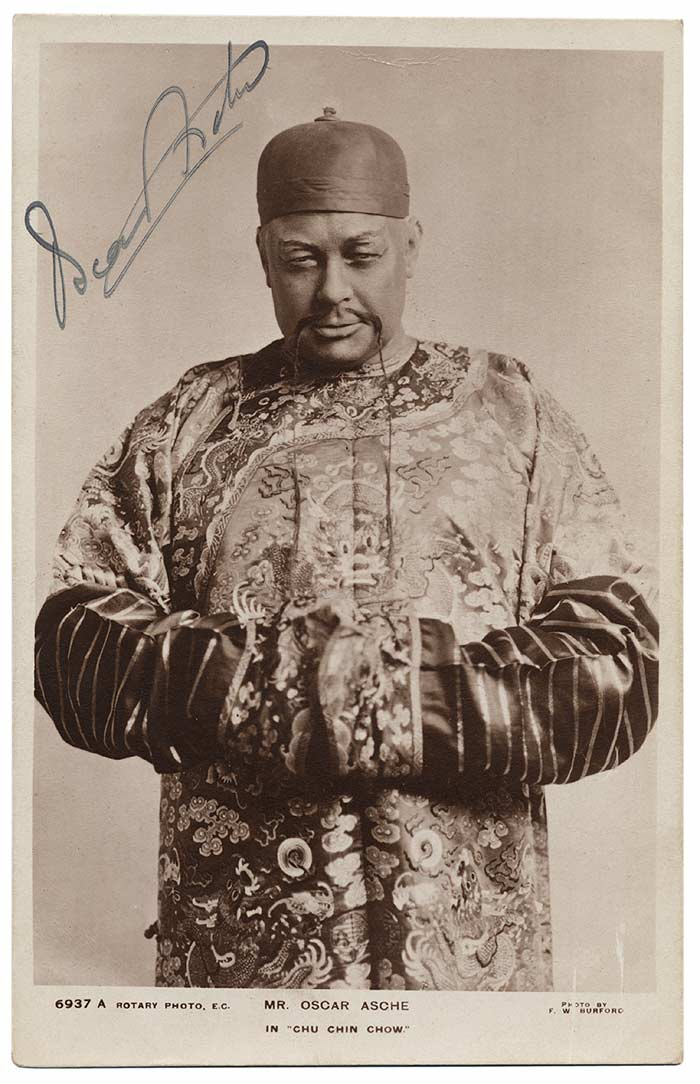
Oscar Asche in Chu Chin Chow; its record-breaking run of 2,235 performances began at the theatre in 1916.

The facilities of the theatre lent themselves to the new genre of musical theatre, and Percy Fletcher was appointed musical director in 1915, a post he held for the next 17 years, until his death. Chu Chin Chow opened in 1916 and ran for a world record 2,235 performances (almost twice as long as the previous record for musical theatre – a record that it held until surpassed by Salad Days, which opened in 1954). Music and drama were combined in Basil Dean's 1923 production of James Elroy Flecker's verse play Hassan, with music by Frederick Delius, which ran for 281 performances.

George and Ira Gershwin's musical Oh, Kay! had its London premiere at His Majesty's on 21 September 1927, starring Gertrude Lawrence and John Kirby; with 213 performances it failed to equal the Broadway run of 256. Noël Coward's operetta Bitter Sweet enjoyed a run of 697 performances beginning on 18 July 1929. The Good Companions, a dramatisation by J. B. Priestley of his novel, premiered on 14 May 1931 and ran for 331 performances.

In the years after the Second World War, musicals continued to dominate at the theatre; they included transfers of the successful Broadway productions Follow the Girls (1945; 572 performances) and the Lerner and Loewe musicals Brigadoon (1949; 685 performances) and Paint Your Wagon (1953; 477 performances). Leonard Bernstein's West Side Story opened in December 1958 for a run of 1,040 performances, transferring from Broadway via the Manchester Opera House.

The London premiere of Fiddler on the Roof was on 16 February 1967, starring Chaim Topol, and the production ran at Her Majesty's for 2,030 performances. Forty years after the first stage adaptation of Priestley's novel, André Previn's musical version of The Good Companions premiered on 11 July 1974 and ran until 15 February 1975, followed by Andrew Lloyd Webber and Alan Ayckbourn's collaboration, Jeeves, on 22 April 1975, which ran for just over a month, closing on 24 May.

John Cleese organised A Poke in the Eye (With a Sharp Stick) as a benefit for Amnesty International at the theatre in 1976, and it was broadcast as Pleasure at Her Majesty's. This was the first of The Secret Policeman's Balls, organised by and starring such performers as Peter Cook, Graham Chapman, and Rowan Atkinson. The venue was also the setting for the popular ITV variety series Live from Her Majesty's, which ran on television from 1983 to 1988. It was on this programme that Tommy Cooper collapsed and died on stage in 1984.

The "boat scene" in The Phantom of the Opera employing Victorian stage machinery

The Phantom of the Opera had its world premiere on 9 October 1986 at the theatre, winning the Olivier Award for Best New Musical; it featured Sarah Brightman and Michael Crawford, who won an Olivier award for his performance in the title role. The original Victorian stage machinery remains beneath the stage of the theatre; the designer, Maria Björnson, found a way to use it "to show the Phantom travelling across the lake as if floating on a sea of mist and fire". Phantom is the second–longest-running musical and third–longest-running stage work in West End history. It continues to play at the theatre.

The theatre is one of forty featured in the 2012 DVD documentary series Great West End Theatres, presented by Donald Sinden.

=== Capacity and ownership ===
The theatre's capacity is 1,216 seats on four levels. Really Useful Theatres Group purchased it in January 2000 with nine other London theatres formerly owned by the Stoll-Moss Group. Between 1990 and 1993, renovation and improvements were made by the H. L. M. and C. G. Twelves partnership. In 2014 Really Useful Theatres – now known as LW Theatres – split from the Really Useful Group and took ownership of the theatre. In conformity with the custom of matching the title of the theatre to the gender of the British monarch, (Note: The theatre first became the King's Theatre in 1714 on the accession of George I. Throughout the reign of Queen Victoria (1837–1901) it was called Her Majesty's Theatre, reverting to His Majesty's on the accession of Edward VII in 1901. In 1952 the theatre again became Her Majesty's on the accession of Elizabeth II. Following the accession of Charles III in 2022 the name reverted to His Majesty's.) the theatre once again became His Majesty's in 2023, marking the coronation of Charles III.

== Notes, references and sources ==
=== Sources ===
- Cibber, Colley (1740). An Apology for the Life of Mr Colley Cibber – By Himself. Dublin: George Faulkner. OCLC 1067664096.
- Deutsch, Otto Erich (1955). Handel: A Documentary Biography. London: Black. ISBN 978-0-30-670624-0.
- Earl, John; Michael Sell (2000). Guide to British Theatres 1750–1950. London: Theatres Trust. ISBN 978-0-71-365688-6.
- Fenner, Theodore (1994). Opera in London: Views of the Press 1785–1830. Carbondale: Southern Illinois University Press. ISBN 978-0-80-931912-1.
- Gänzl, Kurt; Andrew Lamb (1988). Gänzl's Book of the Musical Theatre. London: The Bodley Head. OCLC 966051934.
- Gaye, Freda, ed. (1967). Who's Who in the Theatre (fourteenth ed.). London: Sir Isaac Pitman and Sons. OCLC 5997224.
- Guest, Ivor (1972). The Romantic Ballet in England. London: Pitman. ISBN 978-0-27-336120-6.
- Highfill, Philip; Kalman Burnim; Edward Langhans (1973). A Biographical Dictionary of Actors, Actresses, Musicians, Dancers, Managers & Other Stage Personnel in London, 1660–1800. Vol. 5. Carbondale: Southern Illinois University Press. OCLC 1000937503.
- Herbert, Ian, ed. (1972). Who's Who in the Theatre (fifteenth ed.). London: Sir Isaac Pitman and Sons. ISBN 978-0-273-31528-5.
- Holden, Amanda; Nicholas Kenyon; Stephen Walsh (1993). The Viking Opera Guide. London: Viking. ISBN 978-0-67-081292-9.
- Jones, Edward; Christopher Woodward (1992). A Guide to the Architecture of London. London: Weidenfeld and Nicolson. ISBN 978-1-84-188012-9.
- Kinservik, Matthew J. (2003). "Patent theatres". In Kennedy, Dennis (ed.). Oxford Encyclopedia of Theatre and Performance. London: Oxford University Press. ISBN 978-0-198-60174-6.
- Lucas, John (2008). Thomas Beecham: An Obsession with Music. Woodbridge: Boydell Press. ISBN 978-1-84383-402-1.
- Mander, Raymond; Joe Mitchenson (1963). The Theatres of London. London: Rupert Hart-Davis. OCLC 1151457675.
- Mapleson, J. H. (1966). Rosenthal, Harold (ed.). The Mapleson Memoirs: The Career of an Operatic Impresario, 1858–1888. London: Putnam. OCLC 1015003.
- Milhous, Judith; Gabriella Dideriksen; Robert D. Hume (2001). Italian Opera in Late Eighteenth-Century London. Vol. 1. Oxford: Oxford University Press. ISBN 978-0-19-816716-7.
- Milhous, Judith (1979). Thomas Betterton and the Management of Lincoln's Inn Fields 1695–1708. Carbondale: Southern Illinois University Press. ISBN 978-0-8093-0906-1.
- Nalbach, Daniel (1972). The King's Theatre, 1704–1867: London's First Italian Opera House. London: Society for Theatre research. ISBN 978-0-85-430003-7.
- Osborne, Richard (2007). Rossini (second ed.). Oxford: Oxford University Press. ISBN 978-0-19-518129-6.
- Parker, John, ed. (1939). Who's Who in the Theatre (ninth ed.). London: Sir Isaac Pitman and Sons. OCLC 473894893.
- Robbins Landon, H. C. (1955). The Symphonies of Joseph Haydn. London: Universal and Rockliff. OCLC 356434.
- Sachs, Edwin (1968) [1897]. Modern Opera Houses and Theatres. Vol. II. London: Ayer. OCLC 1387412.
- Scholes, Percy (1992). "Bach, Johann Christian". In Ward, John Owen (ed.). The Oxford Companion to Music. Oxford: Oxford University Press. ISBN 978-0-19-866212-9.
- Servadio, Gaia (2003). Rossini. London: Constable. ISBN 978-1-84119-478-3.
- Smith, William C. (March 1935). "Handel's First Visit to England". The Musical Times. 76 (1105): 210–213. doi:10.2307/919220. JSTOR 919220. Archived from the original on 3 March 2023.(subscription required)
