= Albert (dancer) =

French ballet dancer (1789–1865)

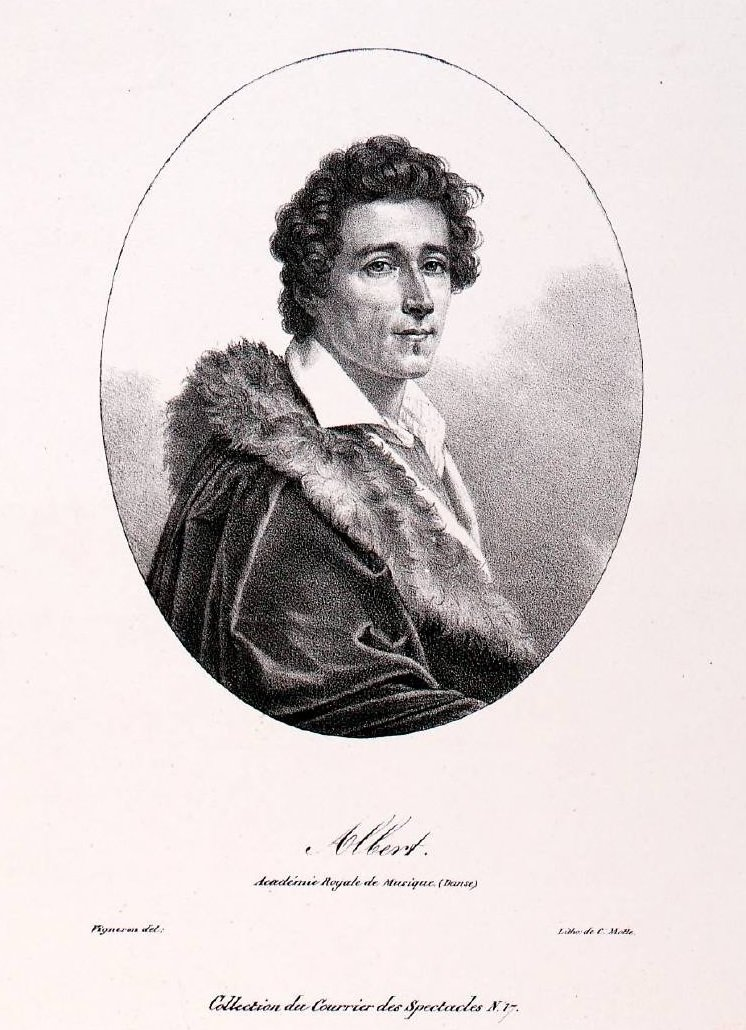
- Albert, de l'Académie royale de Musique (c. 1830)
- Born: François-Ferdinand Decombe; 5 April 1789; Bordeaux, France
- Died: 18 July 1865 (aged 76); Fontainebleau, France
- Occupation: Dancer
- Spouse: Augustine Albert

François-Ferdinand Decombe (15 April 1789, Bordeaux – 18 July 1865, Fontainebleau) was a French ballet dancer and ballet master, under the stage name Albert.

== Career ==
Albert débuted aged 14 at the Théâtre de la Gaîté, before being taken on by the Opéra de Paris in 1808, having been recommended to them by Jean-François Coulon and Auguste Vestris. Ejected by the ballet master Pierre Gardel, Albert divided his time between Paris and London, where he showed all the measure of his talent. Ousted from the Opéra in 1831 to the benefit of Jean Coralli and Filippo Taglioni, he worked in London, Naples and Marseille. From 1838 to 1840 Albert was ballet master to the Brussels Théâtre de la Monnaie, where he made the talents of Arthur Saint-Léon known to the public. On his return to Paris in 1841 he composed the divertissements for the opera La Favorite by Donizetti and for other pieces by that composer. He was also the author of a dance manual, L'art de la danse à la ville et à la cour (Paris, 1834). In 1811 Albert married the soprano Augustine Himm, after which she performed as Augustine Albert.

== Selected works ==
- Flore et Zéphire (Paris, 1815) - Zephyr, choreographer Charles Didelot
- Le Séducteur du village (Paris, 1818)
- Cendrillon (Paris, 1823)
- Daphnis et Céphise (Vienna, 1830)
- Le Corsaire (London, 1837 and Brussels, 1839)
- Une journée de Naples (Brussels, 1839)
- Arsène, ou la Baguette magique (Brussels, 1839)
- Kenilworth Castle (Brussels, 1840)
- La Jolie fille de Gand (Paris, 1842)
