= Jean Aumer =

French ballet dancer and choreographer

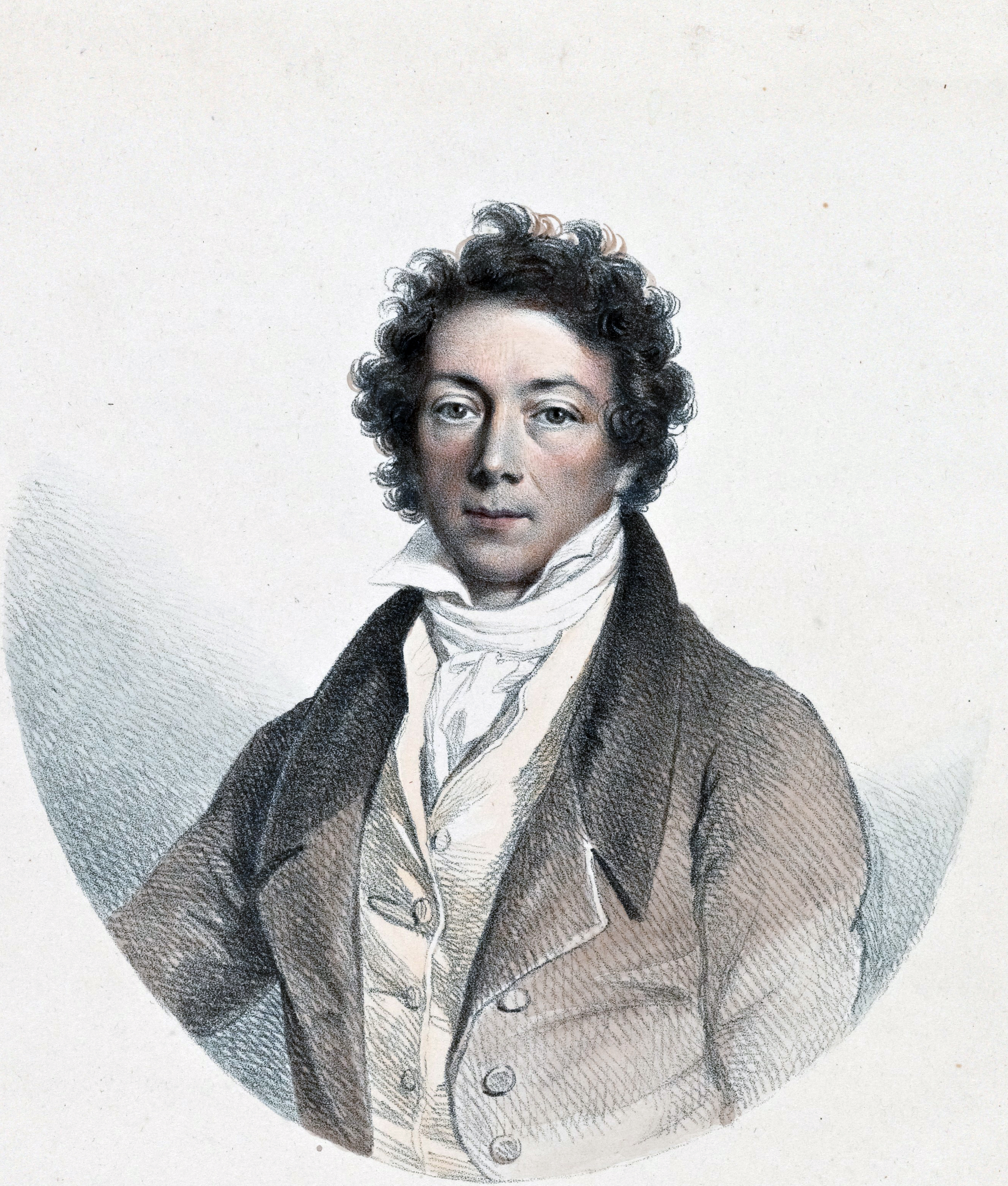
- Jean Aumer in 1815
- Born: Jean-Louis Aumer; 21 April 1774; Strasbourg, France
- Died: 6 July 1833 (aged 59); Saint-Martin-de-Boscherville, France
- Occupation: Dancer
- Years active: 1791-1831
- Children: Sophie-Julie Aumer
- Career
- Former groups: Paris Opera Ballet

Jean-Louis Aumer (21 April 1774 – 6 July 1833), also referred to as Jean-Pierre Aumer, was a French ballet dancer and choreographer.

== Early life and career as a dancer ==
Aumer was born in Strasbourg of a manual labourer and non-theatrical parents and received little formal education. At an early age he became a pupil of Jean Dauberval of the Paris Opera Ballet. When Dauberval became maître de ballet in Bordeaux, Aumer went with him. In 1791 when Aumer was still sixteen, he went with Dauberval to London, where he first performed professionally. Believing he was growing too tall to be completely successful as a dancer, he studied Dauberval's choreographic methods and the related fields of music and art as well.

He was engaged as a dancer with the Paris company in 1797 and made his debut there on 15 May 1798 in the "action ballet" Le déserteur, with choreography by Maximilien Gardel and music by Ernest-Louis Müller. At the Paris Opera he was never to rise above the modest level of double, although due to his height he was useful as a mime.

== Career as a choreographer ==
The Paris Opera's maître de ballet Pierre Gardel presented an obstacle which led Aumer to choose the Théâtre de la Porte Saint-Martin as the venue for which to choreograph and produce his early ballets. Faced with the implacable competition from Gardel, Aumer left France for engagements in Kassel (1808–1814) and Vienna (1814–1820). Brief periods in Paris (1821–1822) and London (1824–1825) were followed by his return to the Paris Opera Ballet (1820–1831), where, enriched by the experience of working abroad, he engaged in a profound renovation of the French repertory, capped by his chef-d'œuvre, Manon Lescaut (1830).

Aumer resigned from the Paris Opera in 1831 and died of a stroke in the summer of 1833 in Saint-Martin-de-Boscherville.

His daughter Sophie-Julie married the danseur Étienne Leblond around 1826.

== Works ==
- 1804 La Fille mal gardée, after Dauberval (Théâtre de la Porte Saint-Martin)
- 1805 Rosina et Lorenzo (Théâtre de la Porte St-Martin)
- 1805 Robinson Crusoé (Théâtre de la Porte St-Martin)
- 1805 Le Page inconstant, after Dauberval (Théâtre de la Porte St-Martin)
- 1806 Jenny ou le Mariage secret (Théâtre de la Porte St-Martin)
- 1806 Les Deux Créoles (Théâtre de la Porte St-Martin)
- 1808: Les Amours d'Antoine et de Cléopâtre (Opéra de Paris)
- 1814 Zéphire et Flore (Vienna)
- 1814 Louise et Alexis, after Le Déserteur de Dauberval (Vienna)
- 1814 Myrsile et Antéros (Vienna)
- 1815 La Fête de la rose (Vienna)
- 1815 Les Bayadères (Vienna)
- 1816 Les Noces de Thétis et de Pélée (Vienna)
- 1816 Les Deux Tantes (Vienna)
- 1817 Amour et Psyché (Vienna)
- 1817 Érigone ou le Triomphe de Bacchus (Vienna)
- 1818 Le Sommeil enchanté (Vienna)
- 1818 Aline, reine de Golconde (Vienna)
- 1819 Ossian (Vienna)
- 1820 Emma ou le Mariage secret (Vienna)
- 1820 Alfred le Grand (Vienna)
- 1820 Les Pages du duc de Vendôme (Paris Opera Ballet)
- 1821 Jeanne d'Arc (Paris Opera Ballet)
- 1824 Le Songe d'Ossian (London)
- 1825 Cléopâtre, reine d'Égypte (London)
- 1827 Astolphe et Joconde (Paris Opera Ballet)
- 1827 La Somnambule ou L'Arrivée d'un nouveau seigneur (Paris Opera Ballet)
- 1828 Lydie (Paris Opera Ballet)
- 1829 La Belle au bois dormant (Paris Opera Ballet)
- 1830 Manon Lescaut (Paris Opera Ballet)

== Sources ==
- Babsky, Monique (1998). "Aumer, Jean-Louis", vol. 1, pp. 201–203, in International Encyclopedia of Dance (6 volumes), edited by Selma Jeanne Cohen. Oxford: Oxford University Press. ISBN 9780195094626 (hardcover). ISBN 9780195173697 (2004 paperback edition).
- Beaumont, Cyril W. (1938). "Jean Aumer", pp. 44–71, in Complete Book of Ballets. New York: Grosset & Dunlop. Copy at Internet Archive.
- Craine, Debra; Mackrell, Judith (2000). The Oxford Dictionary of Dance. Oxford: Oxford University Press. ISBN 9780198601067.
- Guest, Ivor Forbes (2008). The Romantic Ballet in Paris. Alton, Hampshire: Dance Books. ISBN 9781852731199.
- Pitou, Spire (1985). The Paris Opera: An Encyclopedia of Operas, Ballets, Composers, and Performers. Rococo and Romantic, 1715-1815. Westport, Connecticut: Greenwood Press. ISBN 9780313243943.
- Van Aelbrouck, Jean-Philippe (1994). Dictionnaire des danseurs: Chorégraphes et maîtres de danse à Bruxelles de 1600 à 1830. Liège: Mardaga. ISBN 9782870095768.
- Winter, Marian Hannah (1974). The Pre-Romantic Ballet. London: Pitman. ISBN 9780273003342.
