= Arabella Menage =

British actress and dancer

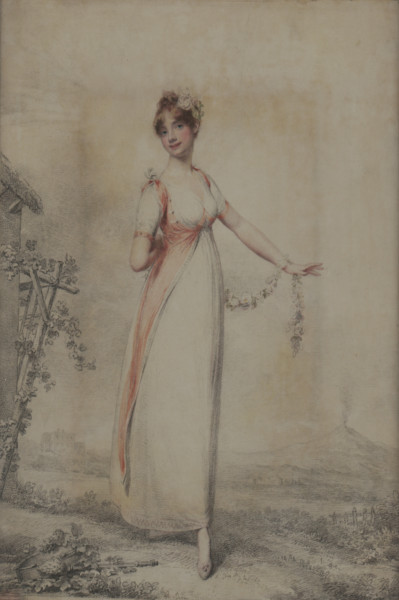
Arabella Menage

Arabella Menage (5 July 1782 – 9 January 1817), also known as Mrs. Sharp, was a British actress and ballet dancer. She was the wife of the artist Michael William Sharp.

== Early life ==
'Bella' Menage was born in 1782 in London, one of at least four children born to Theatre Royal, Drury Lane chorus dancer Mons. Antoine 'Anthony' Menage (died c1818) and his wife Arabella née Moore (c1762–1827), who had married in London in 1778. Born into a family of dancers, on 25 July 1782 she was baptised at St Anne's church in Soho in London. Her brother Frederick Menage (1788–1822) was also a dancer at Drury Lane, finding fame as Chimpanzee in the pantomime Perouse, or the Desolate Island at the Royal Opera House in Covent Garden (1801). A younger brother was James Vincent Menage (1790–1865).

Thomas Gilliland’s The Dramatic Mirror (1808) mentions that Bella Menage was "brought upon the stage in infancy", having been trained by Charles Didelot and James Harvey D'Egville, the latter making her "accomplished" in the hornpipe.

== Stage career ==
Her dancing career commenced as Juliana, one of the infants in the afterpiece The Prisoner at the Theatre Royal, Drury Lane in 1792 aged 10, appearing as Miss Menage Junior to differentiate her from both her mother and her older sister, Mary (born 1778), who were also dancers. On 27 December 1792 she danced on stage at Drury Lane in Garrick's pantomime Harlequin's Invasion with her father, brother and older sister. She may have been the 'Miss E. Menage' mentioned by The London Stage who danced in The Enchanted Wood at the Theatre Royal Haymarket on 25 July 1792 and on five other occasions that summer opposite her sister, Mary, the 'E' possibly being an error for 'B' for Bella. She appeared as a 'mere infant' in Colman's three-act play The Battle of Hexham, or Days of Old (1793) and as the Page in Cibber's comedy Love Makes a Man, or The Fop's Fortune. In April 1796 she danced Aladdin in the opera Mahmoud at Drury Lane.

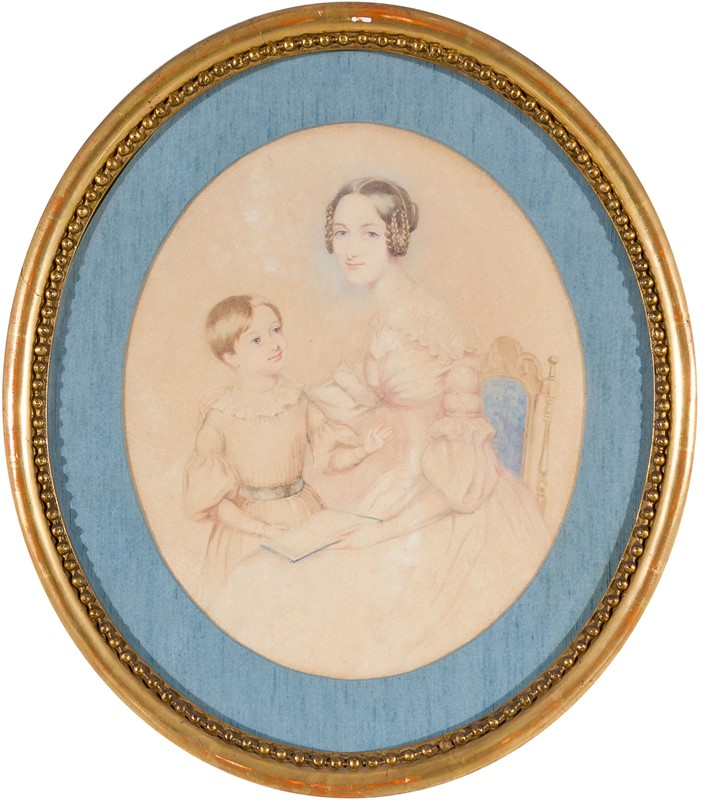
Arabella Menage with one of her sons in 1811 - watercolour by Michael William Sharp

By 1798–1799 Menage was appearing regularly at the Theatre Royal, Drury Lane, dancing that season in the choruses of Bluebeard, The Captive of Spilburg and in Feudal Times. On 1 January 1799 for one night she stood in for Dorothea Jordan as Zingarella in Aurelio and Miranda, while on 7 January that year she played Irene in Bluebeard. On 17 May 1799 she played Nelly in No Song No Supper. During this period she also appeared at other leading venues in London while her salary increased from 13 shillings and 4d a week to £2. During 1799-1800 her roles included Beda in Bluebeard; Cicely Copsley in The Will; Cicely in The Haunted Tower; a Captive in Lodoiska; Sophia in Age of To-Morrow; Viola in The Strangers at Home, and Columbine in the pantomime Harlequin's Amulet, or the Magic of Mona at Drury Lane (December 1800). In 1801 at the Theatre Royal Haymarket she played Rosina in The Castle of Sorrento and Patty in Inkle and Yarico. According to Gilliland that summer's production of the pantomime The Corsair entirely owed its success to Menage's performance as Spoliata, during which she danced the hornpipe.

At the Theatre Royal, Drury Lane during the 1802–03 season her salary increased again to £2 10s a week. She was at Drury Lane during the 1804–05 season, appearing in the pantomime Cinderella, or the Little Glass Slipper in January 1804, later making an appearance in June 1804 at the Theatre Royal Haymarket as Miranda in The Enchanted Island, an adaptation of Shakespeare's The Tempest. She was back at Drury Lane in 1805-06 and 1808–09 and was still appearing there during the 1811–12 season when her salary was recorded as £5 a week. During this period she was Ethelinde in Caractacus (1808) opposite her former dance teacher James Harvey D'Egville in the title role and was in Little Fanny's Love and The Lover's True Knot.

== Marriage and later life ==
In 1808 Thomas Gilliland described her as an "excellent dancer, and pretty little woman" with a small but elegant figure and regular and pretty features. The actress Sarah Siddons was less complimentary, describing Menage in a 1804 letter as "a naughty little dancing Girl at Drury Lane". On 11 August 1804 at St James's Church in Piccadilly she married Michael William Sharp, a successful portrait painter and a former student of Sir William Beechey. Sharp was distantly related to Mrs. Siddons, who said the forthcoming marriage "will afflict his poor Mother and Sister." As Mrs. Sharp her stage career continued until at least the 1811–1812 season.

Arabella Menage Sharp died at her home in Duke Street, Portland Place in January 1817 aged 34. She was buried at the church of St George's, Hanover Square later that month.
