= List of ballets by Adolphe Adam =

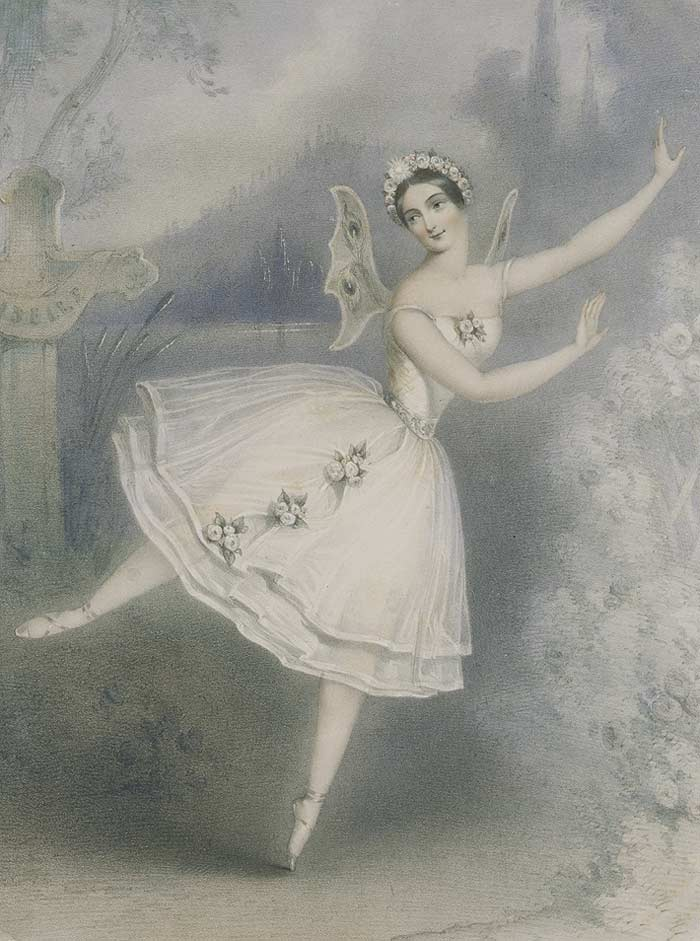
Lithograph by an unknown artist of the ballerina Carlotta Grisi in the title role of Adam's Giselle, Paris, 1841.

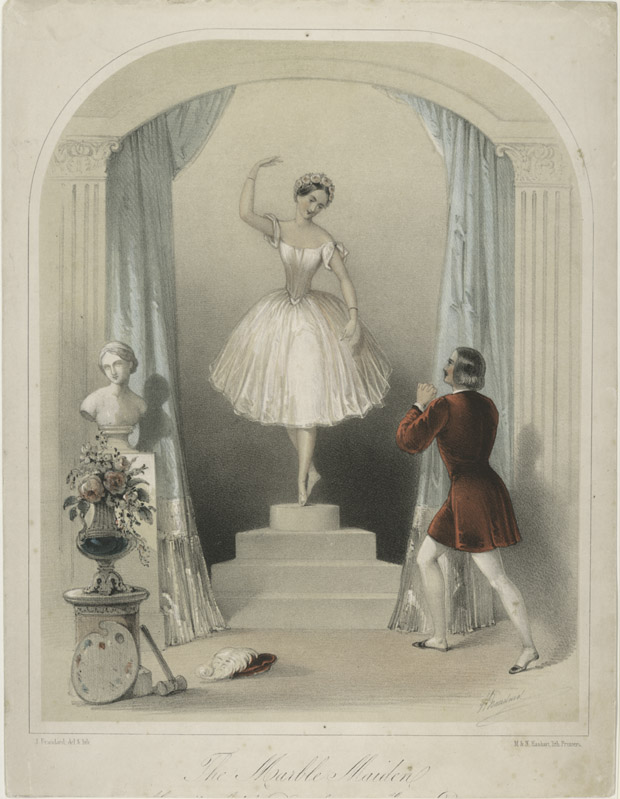
The Marble Maiden, Lithographie, London, 1845

This is a list of ballets by Adolphe Adam (1803–1856).

- La Chatte blanche. English-style pantomime in 1 act (composed jointly with Casimir Gide). Choreographer and librettist unknown. 26 July 1830. Théâtre des Nouveautés, Paris.
- Faust. Grand-ballet in 3 acts. Choreography and libretto by André-Jean-Jacques Deshayes. 16 February 1833. King's Theatre, London.
- La Fille du Danube. Ballet-pantomime in 2 acts, 4 tableaux. Choreography by Filippo Taglioni. Libretto by Eugène Desmares. 21 September 1836. Théâtre de l’Académie Royale de Musique, Paris.
- Les Mohicans. Ballet in 2 acts. Choreography by Antonio Guerra. Libretto by Léon Halévy. 5 July 1837. Théâtre de l’Académie Royale de Musique, Paris.
- L'Écumeur des mers. Ballet-pantomime in 2 acts, 5 tableaux. Choreography and libretto by Joseph Mazilier. 10 May [O.S. 28 April] 1840. Imperial Bolshoi Kamenny Theatre, St. Petersburg.
- Die Hamadryaden. Opera-ballet in 2 acts, 4 tableaux. Choreography by Paul Taglioni. Libretto by de Colombey. 28 April 1840. Königliches Opernhaus, Berlin.
- Giselle, ou Les willis. Ballet-pantomime in 2 acts. Choreography by Jean Coralli and Jules Perrot (for the ballerina's dances). Libretto by Théophile Gautier and Jules-Henri Vernoy de Saint-Georges after Heinrich Heine. 28 June 1841. Théâtre de l’Académie Royale de Musique, Paris.
- La jolie fille de Gand. Ballet-pantomime in 3 acts, 9 tableaux. Choreography by Albert (Ferdinand-Albert Decombé). Libretto by Jules-Henri Vernoy de Saint-Georges and Albert. 22 June 1842. Théâtre de l’Académie Royale de Musique, Paris.
- Le Diable à quatre. Ballet-pantomime in 2 acts, 4 tableaux. Choreography by Joseph Mazilier. Libretto by Adolphe de Leuven after Jean Michel Sedaine. 11 August 1845. Théâtre de l’Académie Royale de Musique, Paris.
- La Fille de marbre. Ballet in 3 acts, 6 tableaux. Choreography by Albert (Ferdinand-Albert Decombé). Libretto by Jules-Henri Vernoy de Saint-Georges. 27 September 1845. Theatre Royal, Drury Lane, London.
- Griseldis, ou Les cinq sens. Ballet-pantomime in 3 acts, 5 tableaux. Choreography by Joseph Mazilier. Libretto by Philippe François Pinel Dumanoir. 16 February 1848. Théâtre de l’Académie Royale de Musique, Paris.
- La Filleule des fées. Ballet-féerie in 3 acts, 7 tableaux with prologue and apotheosis (composed jointly with Alfred de Clémenceau de Saint-Julien). Choreography by Jules Perrot. Libretto by Jules Perrot and Jules-Henri Vernoy de Saint-Georges. 8 October 1849. Théâtre de l’Opéra, Paris.
- Orfa. Ballet-pantomime in 2 acts. Choreography by Joseph Mazilier. Libretto by François-Hippolyte Levroy and Henri Trianon. 29 December 1852. Théâtre de l’Académie Impériale de Musique, Paris. The girl Orfa is kidnapped by Loki. Her fiance Lodbrog, with Odin's assistance, rescues Orfa from the volcano Hecla and they get married in Valhalla.
- Le Corsaire. Ballet-pantomime in 3 acts, 5 tableaux with epilogue-apotheosis. Choreography by Joseph Mazilier. Libretto by Jules-Henri Vernoy de Saint-Georges after Lord Byron's The Corsair. 3 January 1856. Théâtre Impérial de l’Opéra, Paris.
