= St James's Church, Piccadilly =

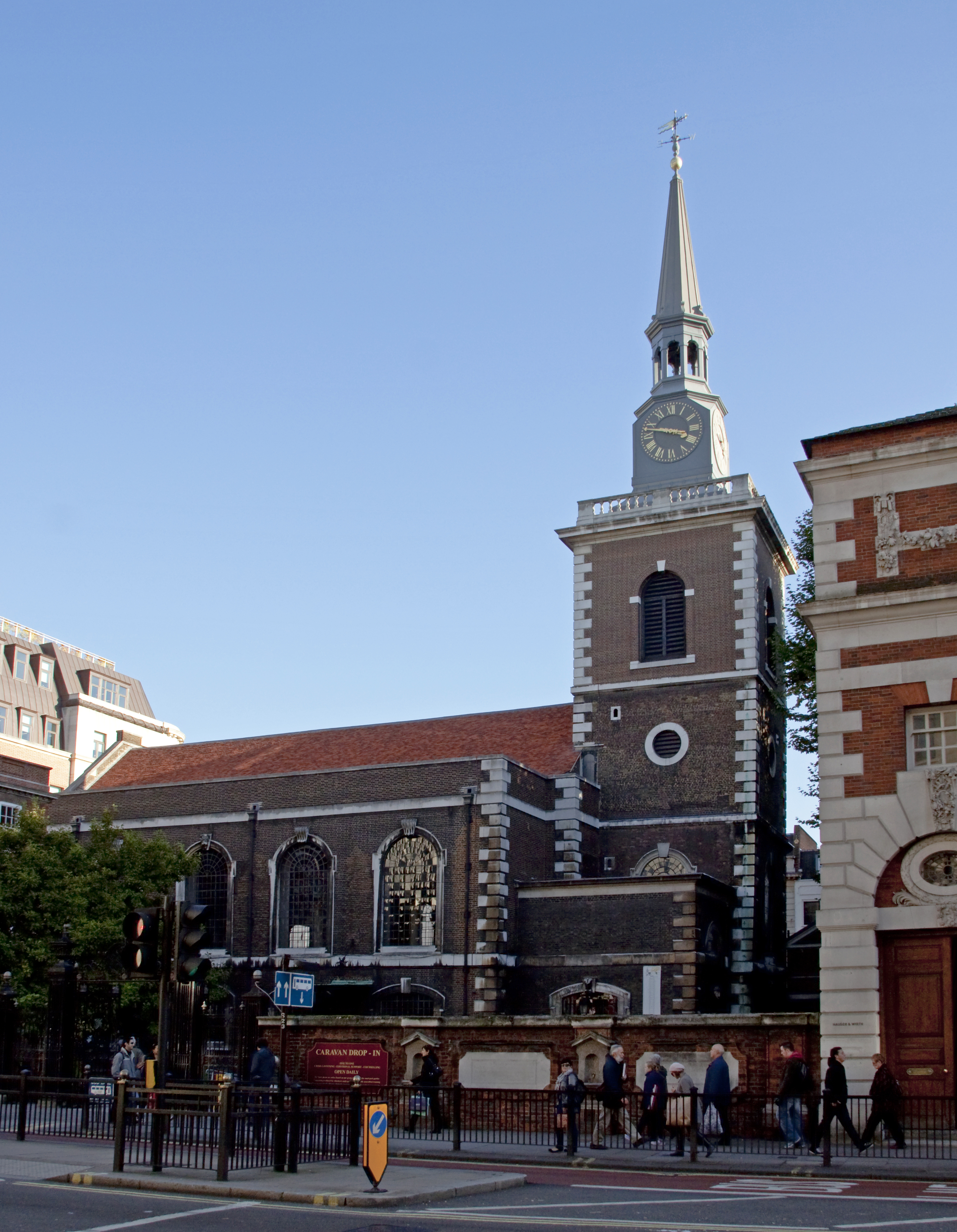
- The church in 2011 51°30′31″N 0°8′12″W
- St James's Church, Piccadilly
- OS grid reference: TQ 29408 80499
- Location: Piccadilly, London
- Country: England
- Denomination: Church of England
- Churchmanship: Liberal
- Website: www.sjp.org.uk

History
- Status: Parish church
- Dedication: James the Great
- Dedicated: 13 July 1684

Architecture
- Functional status: Active
- Heritage designation: Grade I
- Architect: Christopher Wren

Administration
- Diocese: Diocese of London

Clergy
- Rector: Lucy Winkett

St James's Church, Piccadilly, also known as St James's Church, Westminster, and St James-in-the-Fields, is an Anglican church on Piccadilly in the centre of London, England. The church was designed and built by Sir Christopher Wren.

The church is built of red brick with Portland stone dressings. Its interior has galleries on three sides supported by square pillars and the nave has a barrel vault supported by Corinthian columns. The carved marble font and limewood reredos are both notable examples of the work of Grinling Gibbons. In 1902, an outside pulpit was erected on the north wall of the church. It was designed by Temple Moore and carved by Laurence Arthur Turner. It was damaged in 1940, but restored at the same time as the rest of the fabric.

== History ==
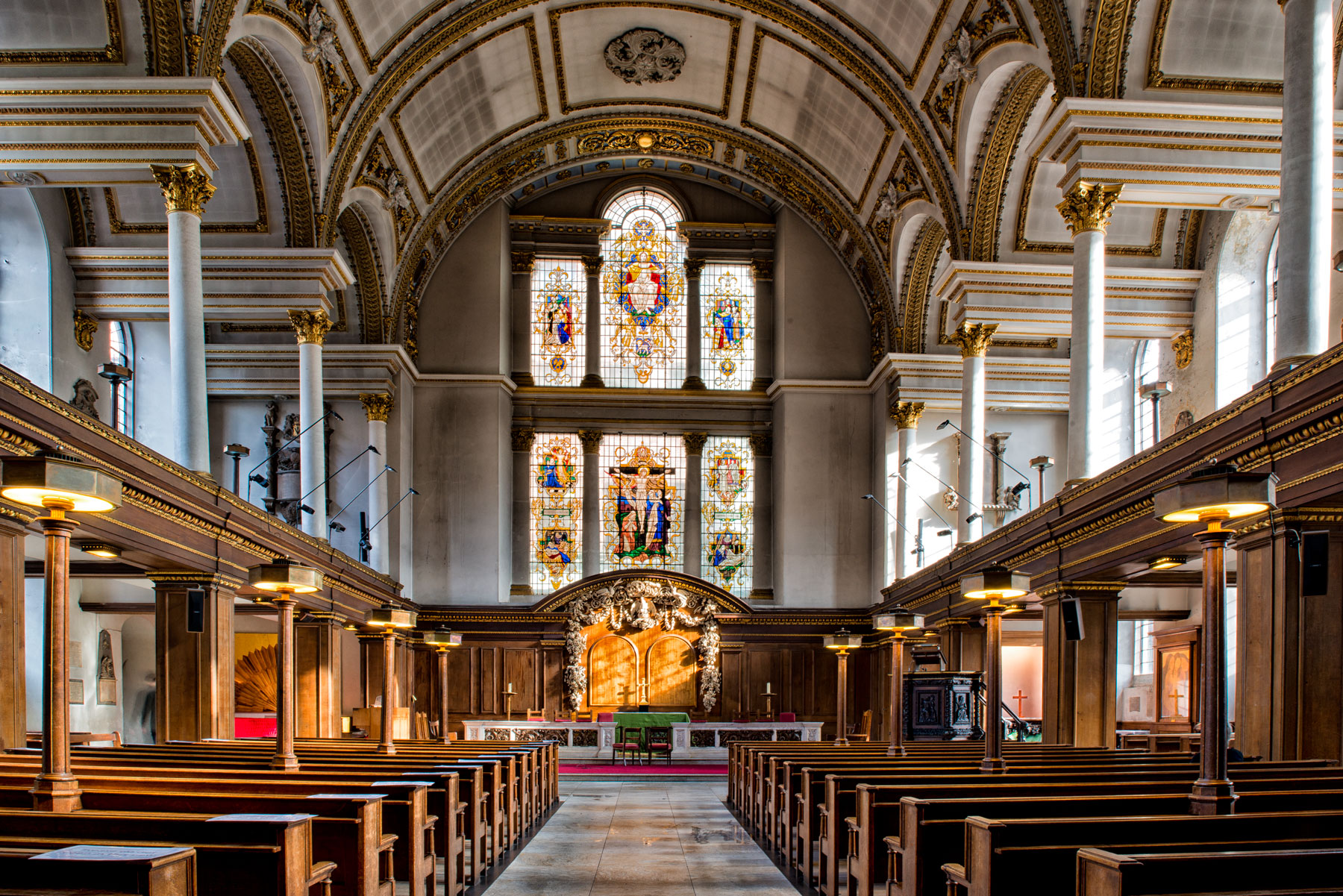
The church's interior

In 1662, Henry Jermyn, 1st Earl of St Albans, was granted land for residential development on what was then the outskirts of London. He set aside land and £7,000 for the building of a parish church and churchyard on the south side of what is now Piccadilly. Christopher Wren was appointed the architect in 1672 and the church was consecrated on 13 July 1684 by Henry Compton, the Bishop of London. In 1685 the parish of St James was created for the church.

The church was severely damaged by enemy action in the London Blitz on 14 October 1940. After the war ended, the church was restored by Sir Albert Richardson. Specialist contractors, Rattee and Kett, of Cambridge, under the supervision of Messrs. W. F. Heslop and F. Brigmore, undertook restoration work, which was completed in 1954. The old lead-covered spire was replaced by a much lighter fibreglass copy. The restored interior, with its pews and light fittings, represents a rare survival of a full suite of church furnishing by Richardson. Southwood Garden was created in the churchyard by Viscount Southwood after the Second World War as a garden of remembrance, "to commemorate the courage and fortitude of the people of London", and was opened by Queen Mary in 1946.

== Beliefs ==
The church has an inclusive vision.

== Present ==
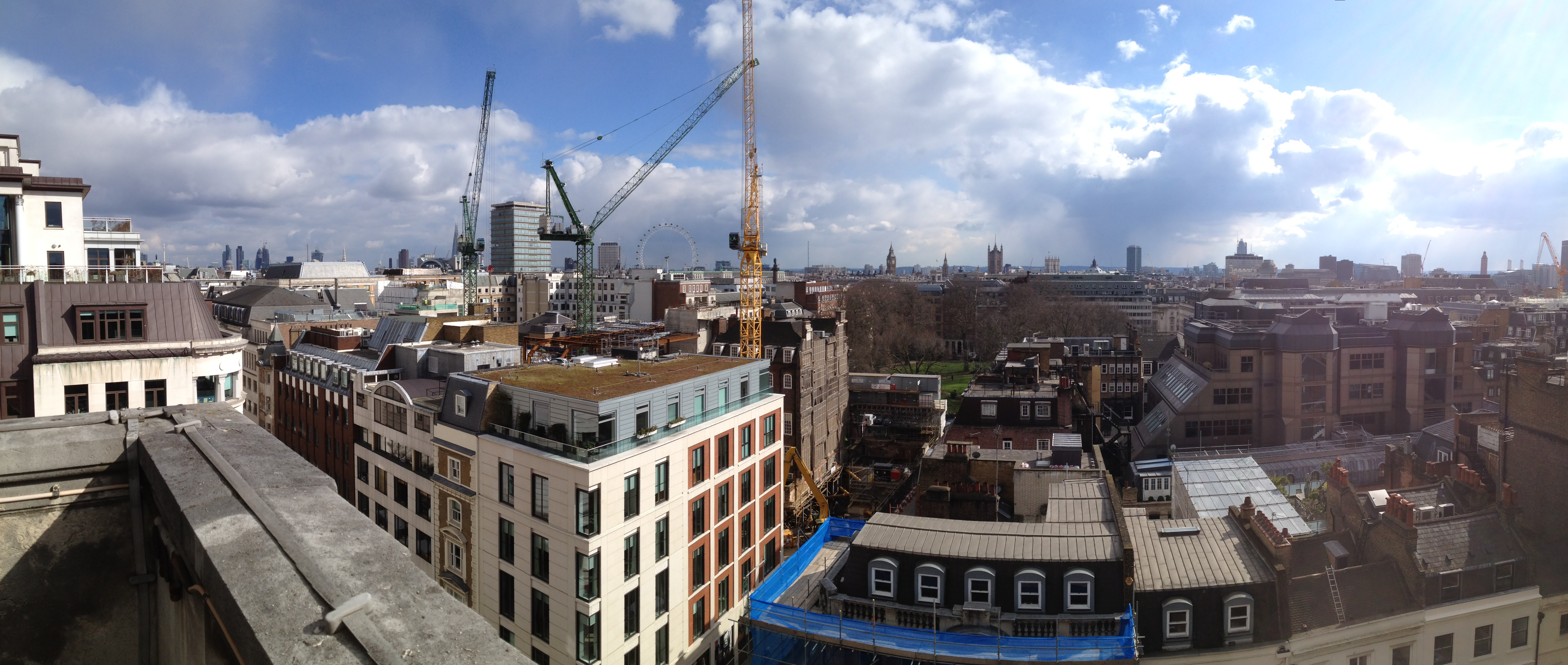
View looking southeast from the tower, showing many of the landmarks of London

Like many central London churches surrounded by commercial buildings and ever fewer local people, St James's lost numbers and momentum in the 1960s and 1970s. When, in 1980, Donald Reeves was offered the post of rector, the bishop allegedly said "I don't mind what you do, just keep it open." During that decade and most of the 1990s numbers and activity grew, the clergy and congregation gaining a reputation for being a progressive, liberal and campaigning church. That has continued. The "congregation" rejects that description and prefers "community". It is centred on the Eucharist, the celebration of the principal Christian sacrament. It finds expression in a wide range of interest groups: spiritual explorers, labyrinth walking, Julian prayer meetings, the Vagabonds group (a lively discussion group which takes its name from a William Blake poem and in faithfulness to that text meets in a local alehouse), an LGBT group and many others. The community has actively supported, and supports, the ordination of women to all the orders of the church, the just treatment of asylum seekers and those living in poverty. It celebrates what it regards as the "radical welcome" found in the heart of the Gospels and attested to by the Incarnation. The church was embroiled in a controversy in 2023 after organising a drag show in the Church, it drew some criticism, being described as "inappropriate". In May 2024 St James's was the first church to have a show garden at RHS Chelsea Flower Show. Its gold award-winning 'Imagine the World to be Different' garden was designed by Robert Myers to highlight the restorative power of urban green spaces and was sponsored by Project Giving Back in support of its fundraising campaign for the Wren Project, to revitalise the church and garden.

=== Organ ===
The west wall of the Church is dominated by a sumptuous organ case of carved and gilded oak by Grinling Gibbons, which originally contained an organ by Renatus Harris, originally built for the Roman Catholic chapel in Whitehall Palace, and installed here in 1691. This organ was entirely rebuilt in 1852 by J. C. Bishop, who added the choir case that now sits in front of the original Gibbons Case. A restoration project has been underway since at least 1982, which has not yet come to fruition. The current proposal is to re-build a new organ within the historic case. At present, the case sits empty, and an electronic replacement is used instead.

Henry Purcell and John Blow went to St James's as soon as the organ had been set up to play it, and to report on the installation to the rector and churchwardens. Raphael Courteville, sometimes known as Ralph Courteville, was appointed organist from 1691 on Purcell's recommendation. He composed the hymn tune St James, usually dated 1697. His son, also called Rapheal, succeeded him as organist, serving from 1729 until 1772. Handel almost certainly played the organ, as he lived across the street at Burlington House from 1712 to 1720. In his diaries, Haydn recorded hearing Thomas Sanders Dupuis improvising fugues on the organ in 1792, describing him as ‘a great organist’. John Freckleton Burrowes (1787-1852) was organist for almost 40 years from the early 1800s. Edgar Pettman was organist from 1897 until 1902. His successor was Leopold Stokowski, who stayed until 1905. Arthur John Mason was organist from 1933 until 1940. Sir Nicholas Jackson was organist from 1971 until 1974.

=== Concerts ===
Concerts are regularly held in the church. Concerts have included performances by popular contemporary musicians such as John Grant, Tokio Myers, Victoria Canal, R.E.M., the folk musician Laura Marling as part of her "church tour", the collegiate Indian-American music group Penn Masala and Devin Townsend on his 2015 UK acoustic tour.

=== Creative art programme ===
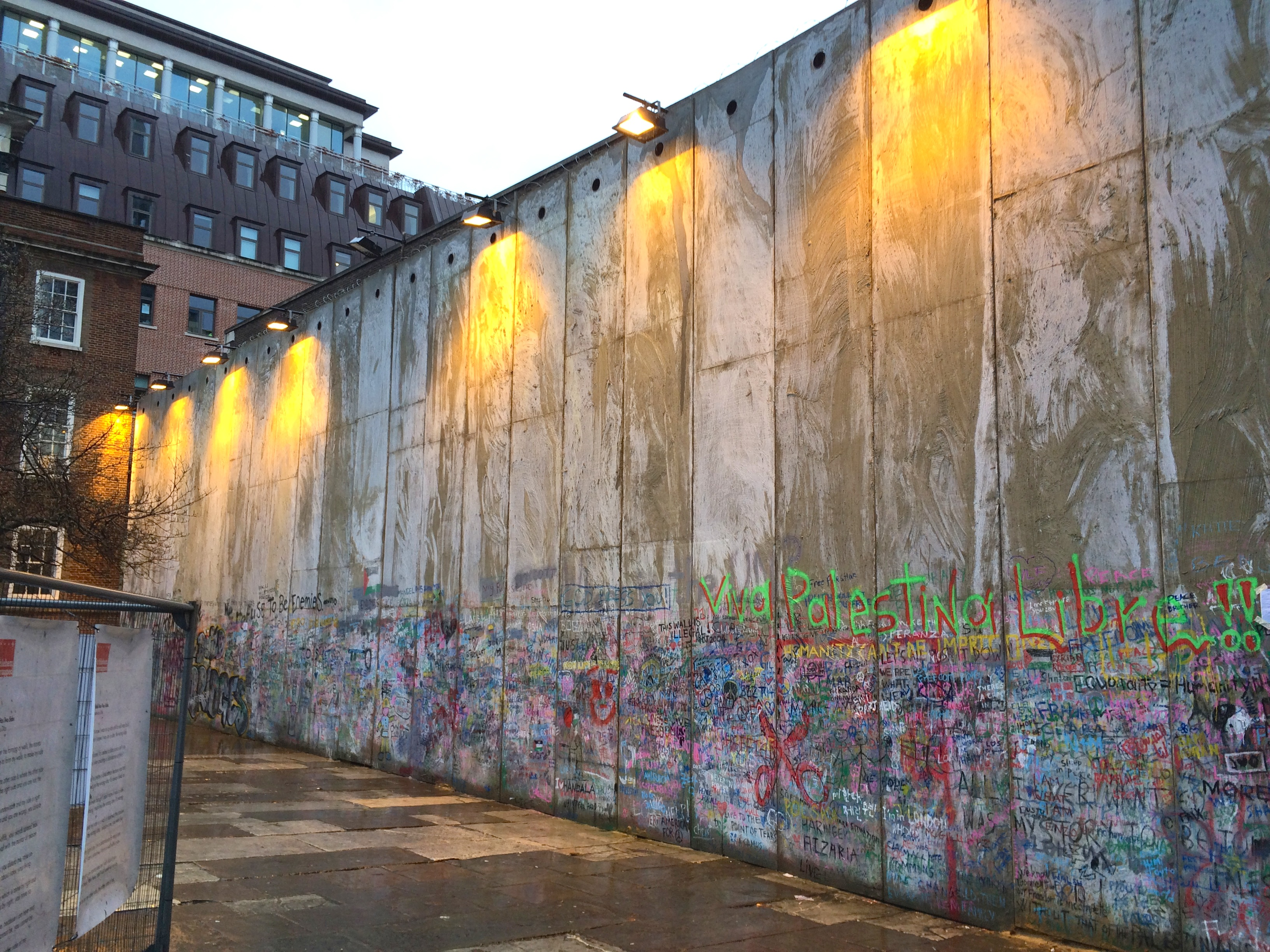
Replica section of the Israeli Security Wall, built in the church grounds, as part of the international protest against the Israeli wall

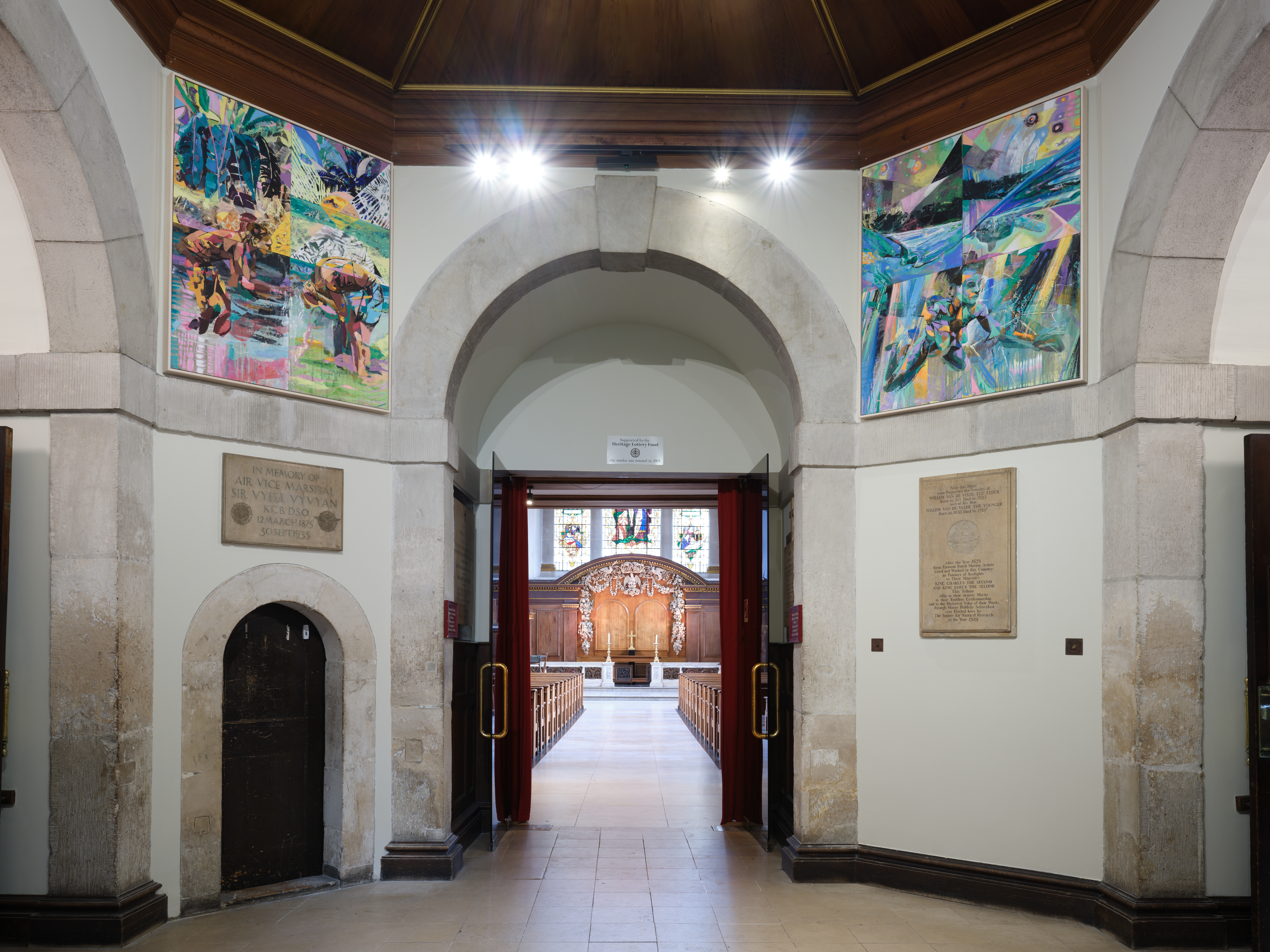
The River, and Passage by Che Lovelace installed in St James's Piccadilly. Photo Stephen White & Co

Hauser & Wirth, a contemporary art gallery, ran a programme of outdoor sculpture exhibitions in Southwood Garden in the grounds of the church in 2009–2010. The first exhibition was of work by the Swiss sculptor Hans Josephsohn.

From 23 December 2013 to 5 January 2014 the "Bethlehem Unwrapped" demonstration against the Israeli West Bank barrier featured an art installation by Justin Butcher, Geof Thompson, and Dean Willars, which included a large replica section of the wall. The installation blocked the view of the church, other than a section of the top of the tower, which was stated by church authorities to be part of the point of the demonstration.

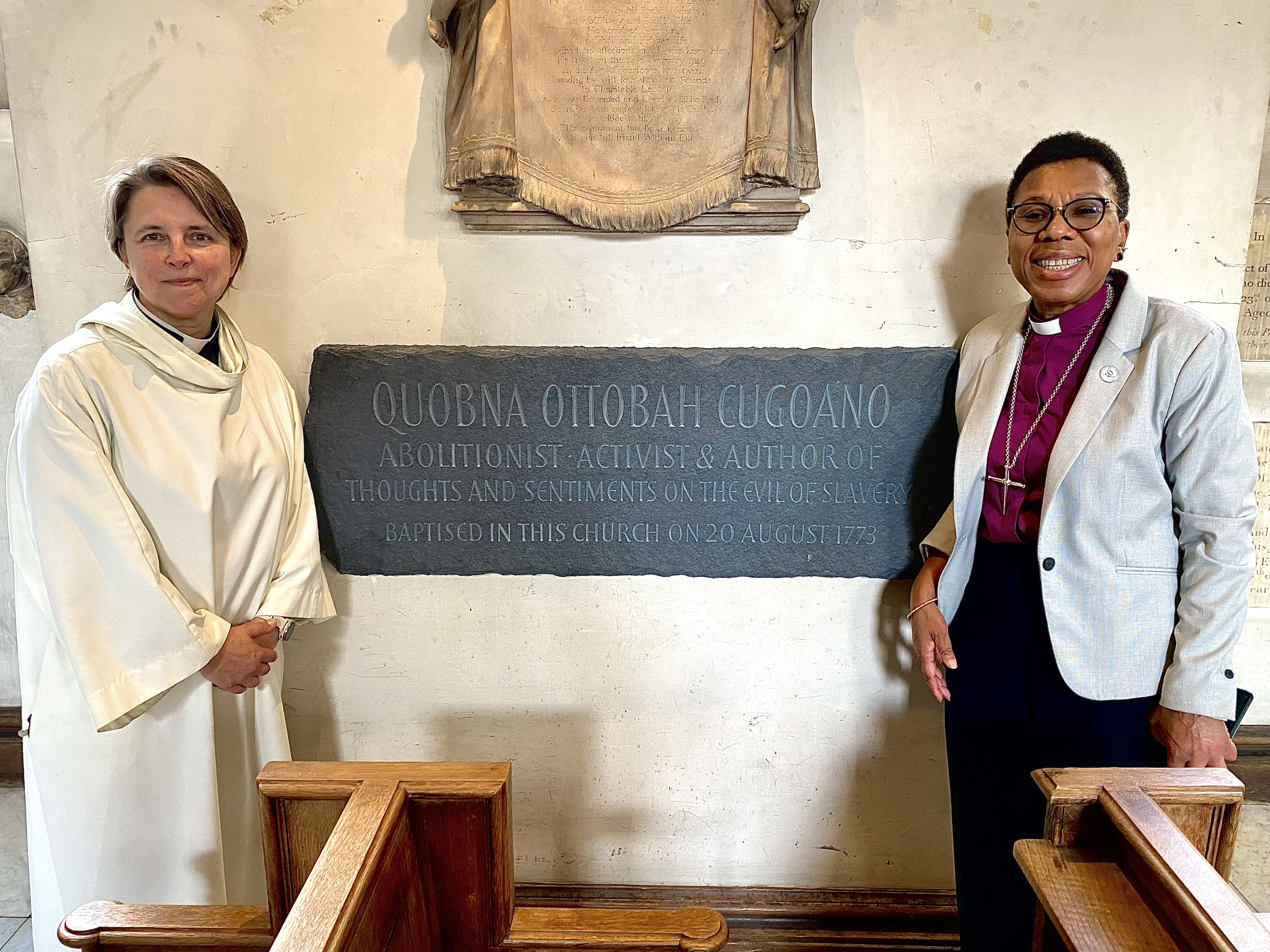
Revd Lucy Winkett and Revd Dr Rosemarie Mallett at the dedication of the plaque commemorating 250th anniversary of Ottobah Cugoano's baptism on 20 Aug 2023

Following a short-term residency based in the bell tower at St James's, Turner Prize nominated artist Jesse Darling's Miserere (a substantial new work in the form of a choir or congregation) was installed in the church 12–16 October 2022.

In September 2023, a series of murals by Che Lovelace were unveiled in the church, to mark the 250th anniversary of the baptism of abolitionist Ottobah Cugoano, which took place at St James's in 1773; it was the first permanent artwork commissioned by the church, as well as the first anywhere in the world to commemorate Cugoano.

== Rectors of St James's ==
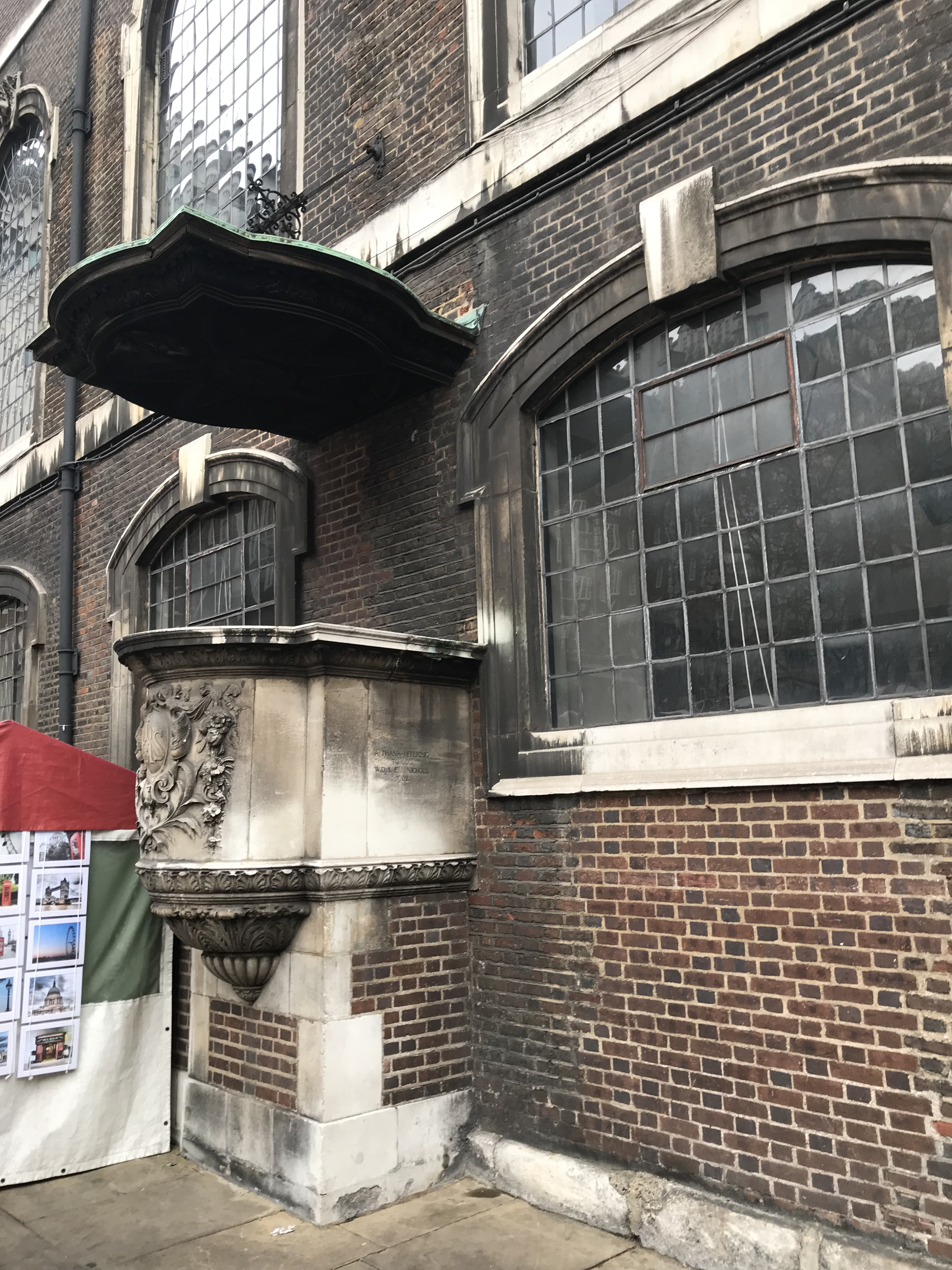
The external pulpit

- 1685–1692 Thomas Tenison (later Archbishop of Canterbury)
- 1692–1695 Peter Birch (in opposition to Wake, removed by House of Lords adjudication in 1695)
- 1693–1706 William Wake (later Archbishop of Canterbury)
- 1706–1709 Charles Trimnell (also Bishop of Norwich from 1708, later Bishop of Winchester)
- 1709–1729† Samuel Clarke (philosopher)
- 1729–1733 Robert Tyrwhitt
- 1733–1750 Thomas Secker (also Bishop of Bristol then Oxford, later Archbishop of Canterbury)
- 1750–1759 Charles Moss (also Archdeacon of Colchester, later Bishop of St David's then Bath & Wells)
- 1759–1763† Samuel Nicolls
- 1763–1802† William Parker
- 1802–1825† Gerrard Andrewes (also Dean of Canterbury from 1809)
- 1825–1845 John Giffard Ward (later Dean of Lincoln)
- 1846–1853 John Jackson (later Bishop of Lincoln then London)
- 1853–1895 John Edward Kempe
- 1895–1900 Alfred Barry (formerly Bishop of Sydney)
- 1900–1914† Joseph McCormick
- 1914–1918 William Temple (later Archbishop of Canterbury)
- 1918–1922 Herbert Priestley Cronshaw
- 1922–1954† Charles Lambert (also Archdeacon of Hampstead)
- 1954–1967 John Brewis (formerly Archdeacon of Doncaster)
- 1967–1980 Bill Baddeley (formerly Dean of Brisbane)
- 1980–1998 Donald Reeves
- 1999–2009 Charles Hedley
- 2010– Lucy Winkett

† Rector died in post

== Other staff ==
- Leopold Stokowski was choirmaster from 1902 until 1905, when he left for a similar position in New York.

== Notable baptisms ==
- Sir Joseph Banks, baptised 13 February 1743.
- William Blake, baptised 1757.
- Ottobah Cugoano, baptised (as John Stuart) on 20 August 1773.
- George Thomas Smart, baptised 2 June 1776.
- Philip Stanhope, 4th Earl of Chesterfield
- Lord Chatham

== Notable weddings ==
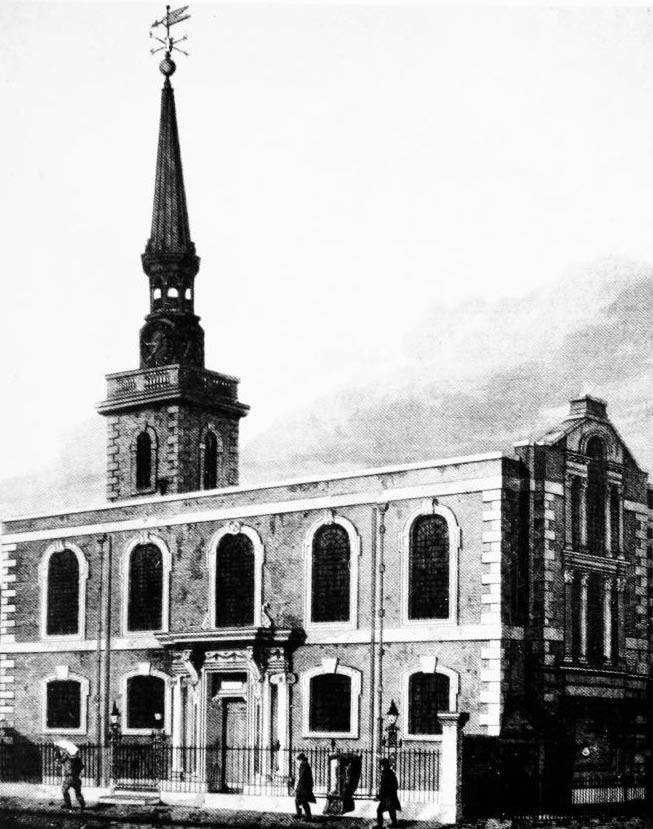
St James's in 1815

- John Ross and Alicia Arnold (the paternal great-grandparents of Francis Scott Key; who wrote the American national anthem) were married.
- The Scottish composer James Oswald married Mary Ann Melvill on 12 February 1744.
- Ince and Mayhew, founding partners of the furniture makers, married sisters in a double wedding here in 1762.
- Frederick de Horn and Angelica Kauffman, 1767. Horn was an imposter who was already married and Kauffman was a successful artist.
- George Bass, explorer of Australia and the Bass Strait, married Elizabeth Waterhouse in 1800.
- Michael William Sharp, portrait painter, married the actress and dancer Arabella Menage in 1804.
- Georges-Alexis, marquis d'Amboise and Louisa Barwell, daughter of Richard Barwell, Member of Parliament, in 1815.
- Philip Hardwick, the architect, married Julia Shaw in 1819.
- General Sir Robert Arbuthnot, KCB, married Harriet Smith in 1826.
- Prince Friedrich Wilhelm von Hanau, eldest son of Frederik William, Elector of Hesse-Kassel (or Hesse-Cassel), married actress Auguste Birnbaum in 1856.
- Also in 1856, George Augustus Hopley, the Belgian Consul to Charleston South Carolina, in the US, married the French-born Felicité Claudine Rancine on 26 July. (George later died in Paris on 28 May 1859, aged 52.)
- On 5 November 1865, Samuel Baker, explorer of Africa, married Florence Barbara Maria von Sass, a woman he had rescued from the white slave trade when she was a girl. He was twenty years her senior.
- In 1873 the actor and dancer Fred Vokes married the actress Martha Isabella 'Bella' Moore.
- John Cyril Porte, an aviation pioneer and air racer, married Minnie Miller on 16 August 1916. The ceremony was conducted by John E. T. Evitt, Curate.
- Robert Graves, an author and poet, married Nancy Nicholson in the church in 1918. The best man was George Mallory.
- John Seward Johnson I, the American heir and son of Robert Wood Johnson I (co-founder of Johnson & Johnson, married Ruth Dill, the sister of Diana Dill, in 1924.
- James Arbuthnot MP, married Emma Broadbent, daughter of Michael Broadbent, in 1984.
- The marriage of Flora Ogilvy, granddaughter of Princess Alexandra, The Honourable Lady Ogilvy, and Timothy Vesterberg, was blessed in the church on 10 September 2021.

== Notable burials ==
- John Arbuthnot, buried 1735
- Charles Bridgeman. Buried 22 July 1738. King's Gardener to George I, George II. Laid out the Serpentine and gardens between it and Kensington Palace. Designed many landscapes, such as Richmond, Kew et alia ., Depicted clutching a garden plan, behind the dancing-master in William Hogarth's 'A Rake's Progress, No. 2, 1732–1734 Charles Bridgeman'https://www.findagrave.com/memorial/202475489/charles-bridgeman. Birth 1690 Exning, Suffolk Charles Bridgeman Esq. Buried 22 July 1738.
- Sir Charles Asgill, 2nd Baronet, equerry to Frederick, Duke of York
- Sir George Baker, 1st Baronet, FRS, FSA, physician to King George III (memorial in church)
- Mary Beale, one of the first professional women artists, buried 1699
- Robert Anning Bell, artist and designer (memorial in church)
- Lieutenant-General Sir Colin Campbell, KCB, British Army officer and colonial governor
- Charles Cotton, poet and writer, best known for translating the work of Michel de Montaigne from the French, for his contributions to The Compleat Angler and for the influential The Compleat Gamester (memorial in church)
- Sir Richard Croft, 6th Baronet, physician to the British royal family and obstetrician to Princess Charlotte of Wales. He became famous due to his role in 'the triple obstetrical tragedy' of 1817 (memorial in church).
- William Douglas, 4th Duke of Queensberry (also known as "Old Q.")
- William Elliot of Wells, equerry to King George II, buried 1764
- James Gillray, notable caricaturist
- Lieutenant General Hugh Mackay Gordon, British Army officer who became Lieutenant Governor of Jersey (memorial in church)
- The Earl of Grantham, Lord Chamberlain to Queen Caroline of Ansbach
- Lord Anne Hamilton, younger son of James Hamilton, 4th Duke of Hamilton
- Field Marshal Studholme Hodgson, British Army officer who served throughout the 18th century
- William Hunter, anatomist (memorial in church)
- Pedro Vicente Maldonado, Ecuadorian scientist (memorial in church)
- William McGillivray and his wife, Magdalen MacDonald (memorial in church)
- François-André Danican Philidor (1726-1795), French composer and chess master
- Stephen Peter Rigaud, mathematical historian and astronomer (memorial in church)
- David Ross (1728-1790) actor and theatre owner
- Bartholomew Ruspini, 18th-century surgeon-dentist and philanthropist, remembered for founding the Royal Masonic School for Girls (memorial in church)
- Benjamin Stillingfleet, botanist, the first bluestocking
- Thomas Sydenham (1624–89)
- Henry Sydney, 1st Earl of Romney (March 1641 – 8 April 1704)
- Samuel Turner, early British visitor to Tibet, interred 1802
- Willem van de Velde, the elder, marine painter (memorial in church)
- Willem van de Velde, the younger, marine painter (memorial in church)
- Frances Deering Wentworth, wife of Sir John Wentworth, 1st Baronet

== Notable memorials ==
- William Blake, poet, painter and printmaker, now considered a seminal figure in the history of the poetry and visual arts of the Romantic Age
- Sir William Bowman, 1st Baronet, surgeon, histologist and anatomist, best known for his research using microscopes to study various human organs
- Richard Bright, physician and early pioneer in the research of kidney disease, particularly known for his description of Bright's disease
- Mary Delany, artist and Bluestocking, equally famous for her "paper mosaicks" and her lively correspondence
- William Curtis Green, architect
- General John Studholme Hodgson, British Army officer who served as Colonel of the 4th (King's Own) Regiment of Foot
- Sir Herbert Hughes-Stanton, watercolour and oil painter, predominantly of landscapes
- Francis Ernest Jackson, painter, draughtsman, poster designer and lithographer
- Sir George Johnson, eminent physician, who became recognised as an authority on cholera and kidney diseases
- Joseph McCormick, cricketer, Canon of York and Chaplain to Queen Victoria, King Edward VII and King George V
- Frederick William Pomeroy, prolific sculptor of architectural and monumental works
- Sir Henry Rushbury, painter and etcher
- Sir James Jebusa Shannon, Anglo-American artist
- Air Vice Marshal Sir Arthur Vyell Vyvyan, KCB, DSO, officer in the Royal Navy in the early 20th century and later a senior officer in the newly created Royal Air Force
- George Spencer Watson, portrait artist of the late romantic school who sometimes worked in the style of the Italian Renaissance
- William Yarrell, zoologist, writer, bookseller and naturalist, admired by his contemporaries for his precise scientific work

=== Detached burial ground ===
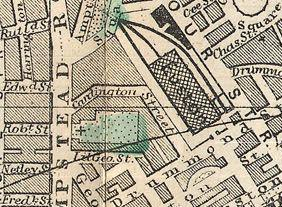
St James's Gardens, shown west of Euston Station, on an 1890 Bacon Traveler's Pocket Map of London by George Washington Bacon

Saint James, Westminster Improvement Act 1789
- Act of Parliament
- Parliament of Great Britain
- Long title: An Act for providing an additional Burying Ground for the Parish of Saint James, Westminster, and erecting a Chapel adjoining thereto, and also a House for the Residence of a Clergyman to officiate in burying the Dead.
- Citation: 29 Geo. 3. c. 47
- Territorial extent: Great Britain

Dates
- Royal assent: 31 July 1789
- Commencement: 20 November 1788 (Note: Start of session.)
- Repealed
Other legislation
Repealed by	London Government (City of Westminster) Order in Council 1901

Status: Repealed

Text of statute as originally enacted

A separate burial ground of St James's Church was developed in Camden, in use from 1790 until 1853. It had been obtained via the Saint James, Westminster Improvement Act 1789 (29 Geo. 3. c. 47), which also provided for the erection of a chapel of ease for the parish, designed by Thomas Hardwick and opening in 1791.

St. James Chapel Act 1869 (Note: Section 1.)
- Act of Parliament
- Parliament of the United Kingdom
- Long title: An Act to authorize the sale of Saint James' Chapel, Hampstead Road, and the utilization of the residue of the property adjoining thereto, for the benefit of the parish of Saint James', Westminster; and for other purposes.
- Citation: 32 & 33 Vict. c. lxxvii
- Territorial extent: United Kingdom

Dates
- Royal assent: 12 July 1869
- Commencement: 12 July 1869 (Note: The Acts of Parliament (Commencement) Act 1793.)
- Repealed
Other legislation
Repealed by	London Government (City of Westminster) Order in Council 1901

Status: Repealed

Text of statute as originally enacted

With the railway-related expansion around Euston Station, the chapel was given a parish of its own, St James Hampstead Road, in 1871, but the cemetery fell into disrepair and became St James's Gardens in 1878 with only a few gravestones lining the edges of the park. Part of the gardens, located between Hampstead Road and Euston railway station, was built over when Euston station was expanded in around 1887. To avoid public outcry, the affected remains were reinterred at St Pancras Cemetery. The gardens were closed to the public in 2017 to allow the further expansion of Euston station for the High Speed 2 (HS2) rail project. Between October 2018 and 2020, archaeologists working on HS2 excavated approximately 40,000 burials. It was proposed to re-bury the remains after they had been examined by osteo-archaeologists. The remains were agreed to be re-interred at Surrey's Brookwood Cemetery which has received relocated remains from London since the 1860s. While almost all remains would be relocated there, it was agreed in 2019 that Matthew Flinders' remains would be buried in his home village of Donington, Lincolnshire. Work to prepare for the arrival of the remains at Brookwood began around August 2020 and was completed sometime after November 2020. The Church hosted an exhibition, Stories of St James's Burial Ground, with Museum of London Archaeology in spring 2023.

Notable burials included:

- James Christie (1730–1803), naval officer and auctioneer
- Matthew Flinders (1774–1814), naval officer and explorer, whose burial was re-located in January 2019
- Lord George Gordon (1751–1793), politician
- Bill Richmond (1763–1829), boxer
- John Charles Felix Rossi (1762–1839), English sculptor
- Thomas Garnett (1766 to 1802), English physician and natural philosopher, first professor of natural philosophy and chemistry at the Royal Institution (1799)

== See also ==
- List of Christopher Wren churches in London
- List of churches rebuilt after the Great Fire but since demolished
- List of churches and cathedrals of London

== Bibliography ==
- London Architecture, written by Marianne Butler, published in 2004 by Metro Publications, ISBN 1-902910-18-4
