= James Harvey D'Egville =

English dancer and choreographer

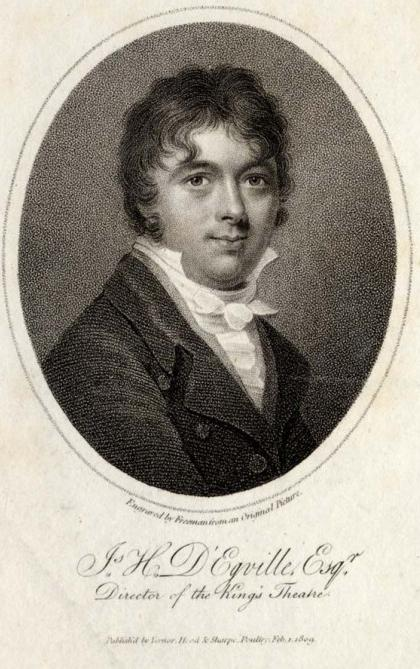
Portrait of James Harvey D'Egville 1809

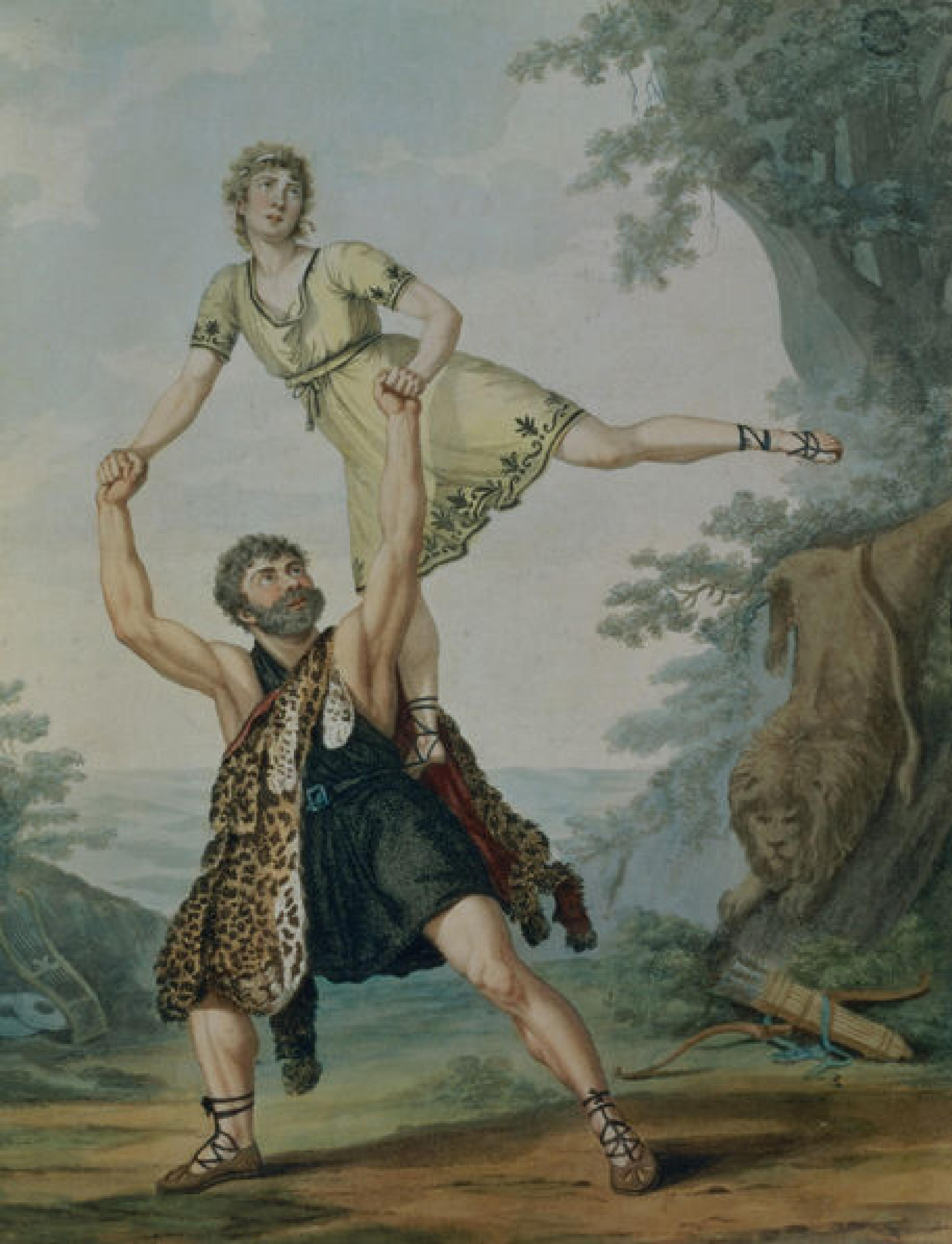
André-Jean-Jacques Deshayes as Achilles and James Harvey d'Egville as Hercules in a scene from the ballet-pantomime Hercules and Deianeira from a painting by Antoine Cardon 1804.

James Harvey D'Egville (ca. 1770 – ca. 1836) was an English dancer and choreographer.

James' father Pierre D'Egville was ballet master at Drury Lane and Sadler's Wells Theatres. His other son George D'Egville was also a dancer.

James D'Egville performed at the Paris Opera from 1784 to 1785.

Back in England, in June 1786, he danced in The Nosegay at the Haymarket Theatre with Maria Theresa Kemble in the presence of the Royal Family. On 7 July he appeared in a ballet entitled Jamie's Return with Kemble and his brother George. It was well received which inspired an artist named Miller to do a painting depicting the three of them.

Between 1799 and 1809 he was choreographer at the King's Theatre, now Her Majesty's Theatre where he had danced as a child in 1783. One of his pupils was Mary Ann Dyke who became tragedienne Mary Ann Duff, while another was Arabella Menage.

In 1827, the London Magazine published an article decrying the fact that D'Egville had won a libel suit against The Spirit of the Age newspaper for writing about his alleged association with the assassin of Princess Lambelle while he was in France in 1792. It annoyed the magazine immensely that simply writing that someone had said something libellous was grounds to win damages against a periodical. The magazine also had snide things to say about D'Egville's ballets. They wrote of him, "the gentleman who deserves the thanks of all the saints on earth, for having cured the young men of the present day of the sinful taste for ballets."

== See also ==
- Cesare Bossi
