= John Freckleton Burrowes =

English organist and composer (1787–1852)

John Freckleton Burrowes (23 April 1787 – 31 March 1852) was an English organist and composer.

== Biography ==
He was born in London. His teacher was William Horsley. His first published work was a set of six English ballads; in 1812 he published an overture (Op.8) which had been performed at the Vocal Concerts at Hanover Square. This was followed in 1817 by a similar work (Op.13) produced by the Philharmonic Society, of which Burrowes was one of the original members. In 1818 the first edition of his Pianoforte Primer appeared, a little work which was very successful. In 1819, Burrowes brought out a Thorough Bass Primer, which achieved a success equal to that of the earlier work. In the course of his long career he also published a Companion to the Pianoforte Primer (1826), a Companion to the Thorough Bass Primer (1832), The Tutor's Assistant for the Pianoforte (1834), and a Guide to Practice on the Pianoforte (1841). He also published collections of psalm tunes, preludes, dances, Scotch and Irish airs, sonatas, a trio for three flutes, songs, and many arrangements of operas for the pianoforte. For nearly forty years, Burrowes was organist of St. James's Church, Piccadilly. About 1834 he settled at 13 Nottingham Place, where he died, after a long and painful illness on 31 March 1852.
