= Frederick de Horn =

First husband of Angelica Kauffman

Frederick de Horn (died 1780 or 1781) (real name Brandt) was the first husband of the painter Angelica Kauffman. According to contemporary sources, which may not be reliable, he was an imposter and bigamist who posed as a Swedish count.

== Marriage to Angelica Kauffman ==
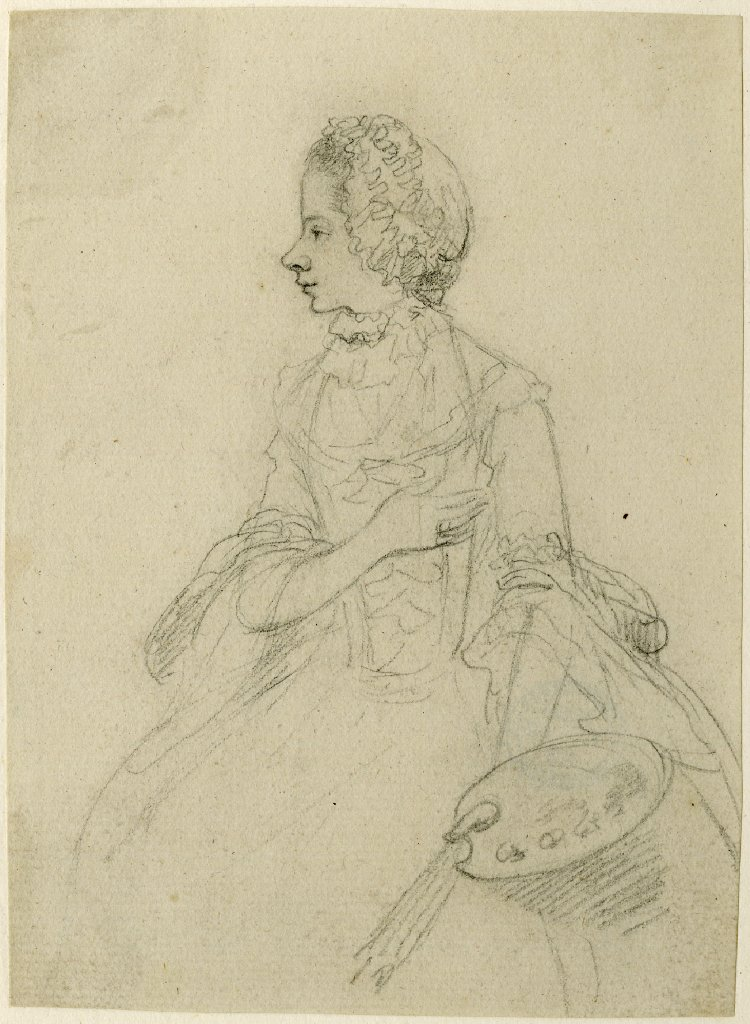
Drawing of Angelica Kauffman by Nathaniel Dance, c. 1767.

Brandt is chiefly known for his marriage to the Swiss painter Angelica Kauffman, whom he met in London in 1766 or 1767, where she had opened a studio after arriving from the continent. The couple married at the Anglican St James's Church, Piccadilly, on 22 November 1767 in front of the Rev. Baddeley. The witnesses were Annie and Richard Horne. Sources hint at a possible second ceremony at a local Catholic church, but there is no evidence for it. Such a ceremony would have been risky, as the anti-Catholic penal laws were still in force, mandating execution for Catholic priests who married Catholics and imprisonment for the newlyweds.

A drawing of Kauffman by Nathaniel Dance (c. 1767), now in the British Museum, shows her with a wedding ring and her hand over her heart, indicating love.

The couple lived apart, and relations between them quickly broke down.

Kauffman and her father paid Horn off, and he left England for the continent; the marriage was dissolved in February 1768.

== Death ==
Brandt died in 1780, or 1781, and Kauffman soon after married Antonio Zucchi (1726–1795).
