= King's Bench Prison =

Former prison in Southwark, London

Coordinates: 51.4998°N 0.0979°W

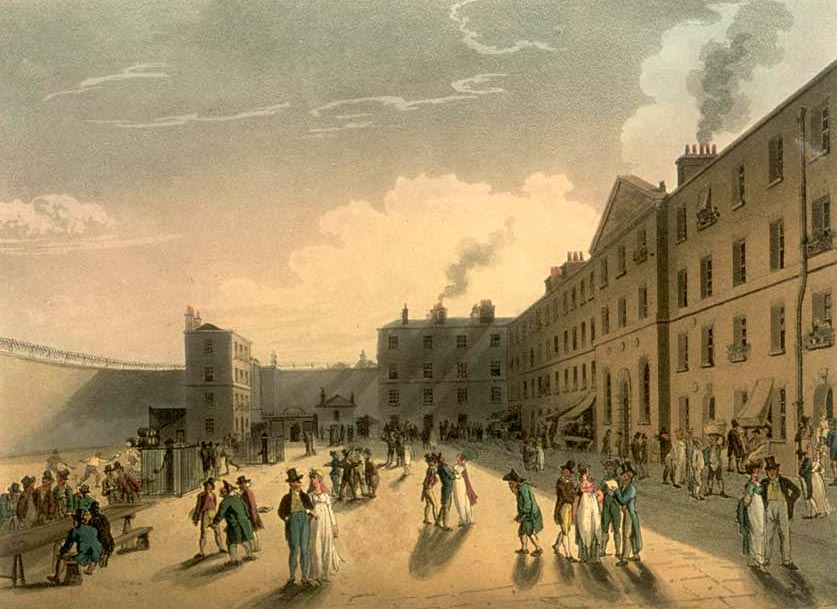
- King's Bench Prison by Augustus Pugin and Thomas Rowlandson (1808–11)
- Interactive map of King's Bench Prison
- Location: Southwark, London, England
- Status: Closed
- Closed: 1880

The King's Bench Prison was a prison in Southwark, south London, England, from the Middle Ages until it closed in 1880. It took its name from the King's Bench court of law in which cases of defamation, bankruptcy and other misdemeanours were heard; as such, the prison was often used as a debtors' prison until the practice was abolished in the 1860s. In 1842, it was renamed the Queen's Bench Prison, and it became the Southwark Convict Prison in 1872.

== Middle Ages ==
The first prison was originally constructed from two houses and was situated in Angel Place, off Borough High Street, Southwark. As with other judicial buildings it was often targeted during uprisings and was burned in 1381 and 1450. During the reign of King Henry VIII, several prison buildings were constructed within an enclosing brick wall. This complex was demolished in 1761.

== 18th century ==
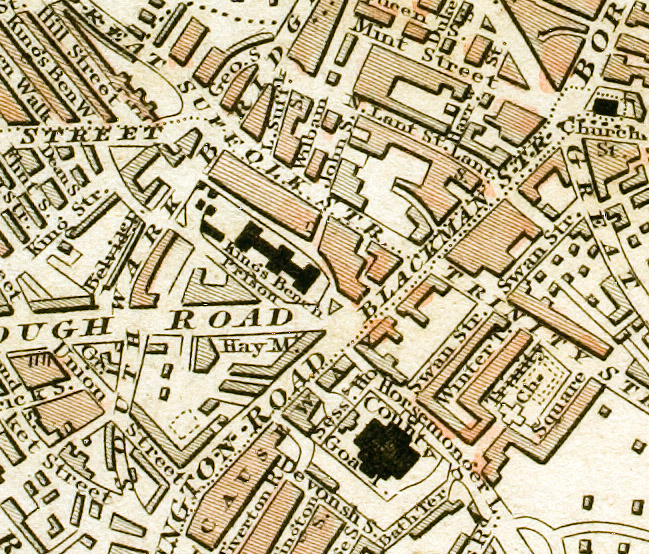
Locations of King's Bench Prison and Horsemonger Lane Gaol, c. 1833.

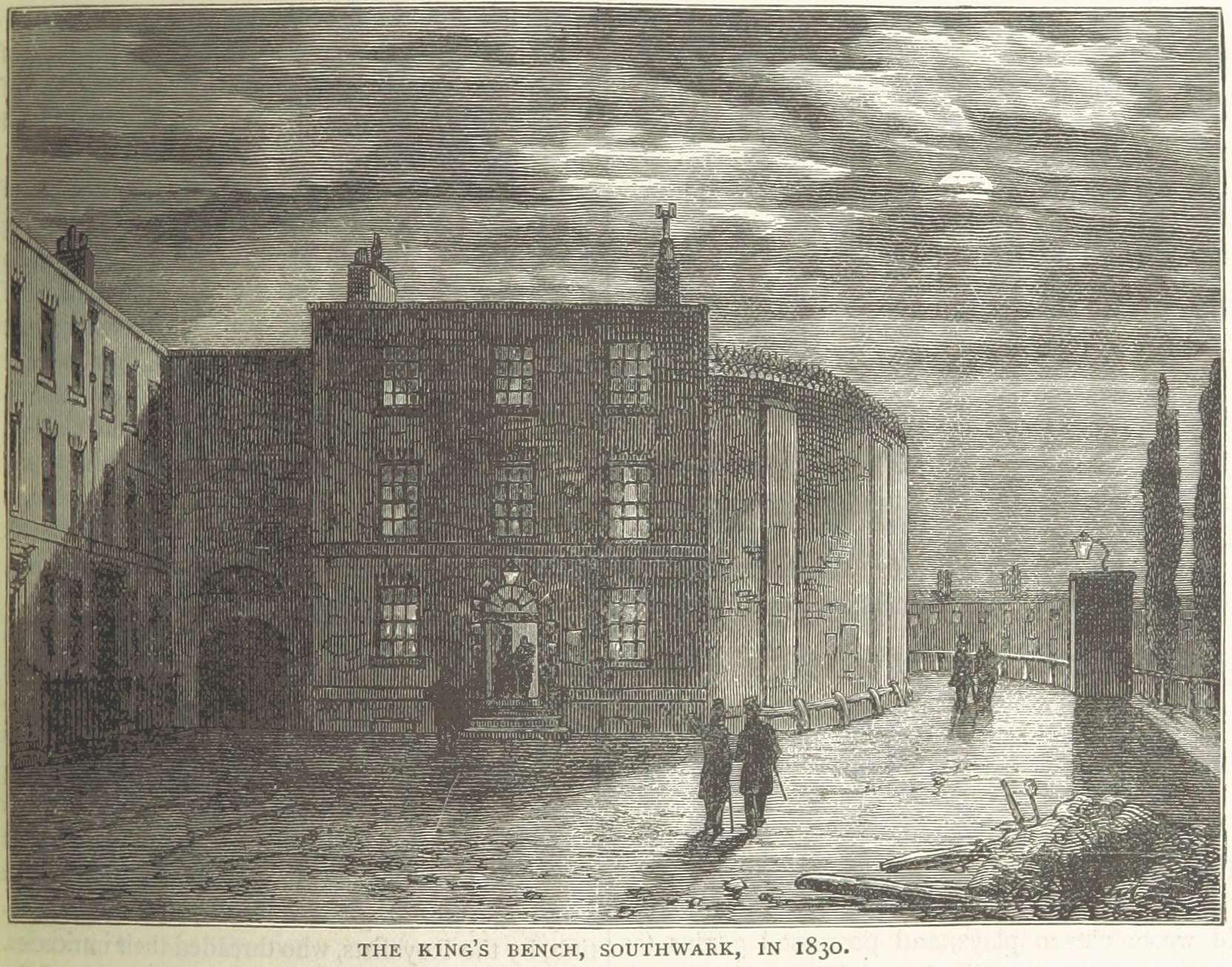
The King's Bench Prison in 1830.

In 1758 a replacement prison was built at a cost of £7,800 on a 4-acre (16,000 m^{2}) site close to St George's Fields (south of Borough Road, close to its junction with Blackman Street/Newington Causeway, and a short distance from Horsemonger Lane Gaol; today the site is occupied by the Scovell housing estate). Although much larger and better appointed than some other London prisons, the King's Bench Prison gained a reputation for being dirty, overcrowded and prone to outbreaks of typhus. Debtors had to provide their own bedding, food and drink. Those who could afford it purchased 'Liberty of the Rules,' allowing them to live within three miles of the prison.

In 1768 John Wilkes was imprisoned at King's Bench for writing an article for The North Briton that severely criticized King George III. His imprisonment prompted a riot in which five people were killed, known as the Massacre of St George's Fields. Like the earlier buildings, this prison was badly damaged in a fire started during the 1780 Gordon Riots. It was rebuilt 1780–84 by John Deval, the King's master mason.

In 1842 it became the Queen's Prison taking debtors from the Marshalsea and Fleet Prison and sending lunatics to Bedlam. Fees and the benefits they could buy were abolished, and after the prison passed into the hands of the Home Office in the 1870s, it was closed and demolished.

== Literary connections ==
English dramatist Thomas Dekker was imprisoned in the King's Bench Prison because of a debt of £40 to the father of John Webster, from 1612 to 1619. In prison he continued to write. John Clavell (1601–1642/3)—the probable playwright of The Soddered Citizen performed by the King's Men—was sentenced at The King's Bench to hang, but he was reprieved following the coronation of Charles I by intervention of Queen Mary.

In Charles Dickens' David Copperfield, Wilkins Micawber is imprisoned for debt in the King's Bench Prison. In Nicholas Nickleby, Madeline Bray and her father live within the Rules of the King's Bench. In Little Dorrit, the prison is discussed by Mr. Rugg and Arthur Clennam. In Herman Melville's Billy Budd, Sailor, King's Bench is referred to when Melville describes John Claggart as being possibly arraigned at King's Bench. Walter Besant's 1899 novel The Orange Girl begins with its protagonist, William Halliday, a musician disinherited by his wealthy family, in the Rules of King's Bench Prison in London.

The part played by the prison in the life of the time is described by William Russell in his 1858 work “The Recollections of a Policeman”. From Chapter XIV, ‘The Martyrs of Chancery’:

In Lambeth Marsh stands a building better known than honored. The wealthy merchant knows it as the place where an unfortunate friend, who made that ruinous speculation during the recent sugar-panic, is now a denizen; the man-about-town knows it as a spot to which several of his friends have been driven, at full gallop, by fleet race-horses and dear dog-carts; the lawyer knows it as the “last scene of all,” the catastrophe of a large proportion of law-suits; the father knows it as a bug-bear wherewith to warn his scapegrace spendthrift son; but the uncle knows it better as the place whence nephews date protestations of reform and piteous appeals, “this once,” for bail. Few, indeed, are there who has not heard of the Queen’s Prison, or, as it is more briefly and emphatically termed, “The Bench!”

== Notable inmates ==
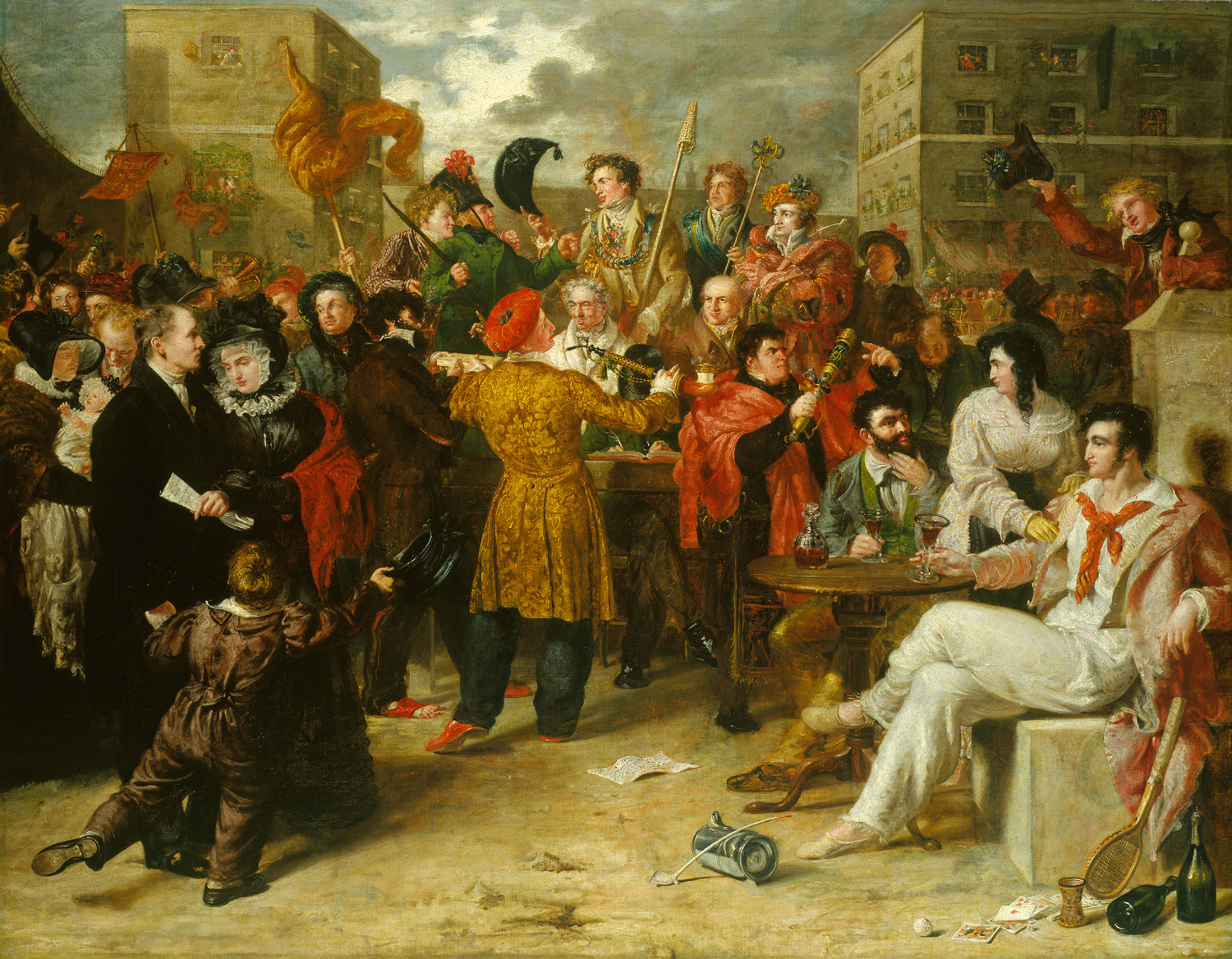
The Mock Election, an 1827 painting by Benjamin Robert Haydon. The artist himself spent several terms in the jail for debt.

- Maria Barrell (poet and playwright; imprisoned for debt in the 1780s)
- Richard Baxter (English Nonconformist church leader)
- Cesare Bossi (composer)
- Thomas Brown (British military officer)
- Marc Isambard Brunel (engineer; imprisoned in 1821 for debt)
- Charles Clerke (officer in the Royal Navy who sailed on all three voyages of exploration with Captain James Cook)
- Claude de la Colombière (French Jesuit priest; imprisoned in 1678 for his connection with the Titus Oates Popish Plot. Served three weeks before his expulsion from England by Royal decree)
- William Combe (writer; imprisoned in 1780 for debt)
- Thomas Cooke (Lord Mayor of London; imprisoned in 1467 and fined £8,000 to King Edward IV and £800 to the Queen Consort Elizabeth Woodville, following his acquittal for treason for allegedly lending money to Margaret, Queen of deposed King Henry VI)
- Edmund Curll (publisher; imprisoned in 1725 for printing and publishing obscene material)
- Alexander Davison (businessman; imprisoned in 1804 for fraud)
- Nathaniel Eaton (schoolmaster of Harvard College and clergyman; imprisoned for debt, died there in 1674)
- Edmund John Eyre (actor and dramatist)
- John Galt (Scottish novelist; imprisoned c. 1829)
- Robert Gouger (1st Colonial Secretary of South Australia; imprisoned in 1829 for bankruptcy)
- Dame Emma, Lady Hamilton (model and actress; imprisoned in 1813 for debt)
- Thomas Curson Hansard (pressman; imprisoned on 9 July 1810 for libel)
- Thomas Hawkes (MP for Dudley; imprisoned in 1857 for debt)
- Benjamin Haydon (British painter; imprisoned in 1827 for debt)
- Henry Hetherington (printer and bookseller)
- Sir Alexander Holborne (Scottish sea captain in the Royal Navy)
- William Hone (writer and satirist)
- Frances Kidder, last woman to be publicly hanged in Britain
- Jeremiah Lear (stockbroker, father of Edward Lear; imprisoned c. 1816 for bankruptcy)
- Frederick John Manning, (coroner of the Verge 1836–1853; imprisoned from 1853 to 1855 for debt)
- Daniel Mendoza (champion boxer of England; imprisoned in 1793 for fraud)
- Titus Oates (an English priest who fabricated the "Popish Plot", a supposed Catholic conspiracy to kill King Charles II. Imprisoned 1685-1688 for Scandalum Magnatum.)
- John Pell (mathematician; imprisoned in September 1680 for debt)
- John Penry (martyr; briefly incarcerated before his execution on 29 May 1593 for treason against Queen Elizabeth I)
- Moses Pitt (publisher noted for publishing The Cry of the Oppressed, a moving appeal on behalf of himself and all prisoners for debt across the nation)
- Edward Henry Purcell (grandson of Henry Purcell, organist, printer, music publisher; imprisoned in 1761 for debt)
- Mary Robinson (poet; imprisoned in 1775 with her husband for his debts)
- Robert Recorde (mathematician; imprisoned for debt, died there in 1558)
- John Rushworth (lawyer, historian, politician)
- Richard Ryan (poet, playwright, biographer; imprisoned in March 1835 for debt)
- John Shebbeare (satirist; imprisoned for libel in 1758 and fined £5)
- Christopher Smart (poet; imprisoned for debt, died there in 1771)
- Charlotte Turner Smith (poet; imprisoned in 1784 with her husband Benjamin for his debts)
- William Smith (geologist; imprisoned on 11 June 1819 for debt)
- Andrew Robinson Stoney (MP for Newcastle upon Tyne and High Sheriff of Durham; imprisoned for conspiracy to abduct his wife, died there in 1810)
- John Horne Tooke (clergyman and politician)
- Samuel Vetch (1st Governor of Nova Scotia; imprisoned for debt, died there in 1732)
- John Wilkes (MP for Middlesex; imprisoned on 10 May 1768 for libel)
