= Cesare Bossi =

Italian composer (1773–1802)

Cesare Bossi (1773—September 1802) was an Italian-born composer. He is most known as a composer of ballets which he wrote for the King's Theatre in Haymarket in London.

== Career ==
Bossi was born in Ferrara in 1773.

None of the sources provide information about his training or early career. One source states that while in Italy he wrote operas as well as piano music including sonatas.

In 1795, he emigrated to London. There he became associated with the King's Theatre in Haymarket where he was a composer of ballets, a conductor, and responsible for the musical preparation of operas. "In this task there have been few who could excel him." His association with the theatre lasted from 1795 to 1796 through the 1799–1800 season. Most of his ballets were written between 1796 and 1800. It was said that he composed with "unexampled rapidity", and that his melodies were of high quality.

He married a Mademoise del Caro, a dancer in the company. She began to be billed as "Madame Bossi" as of 6 February 1796. By 2 June 1800, the couple were living at No. 1 Great Suffolk Street.

In September 1802, the Monthly Mirror reported that Bossi had died in the King's Bench Prison "of a deep decline." The paper called him "A musical professor of eminent talents." He left his widow Del Caro and four children.

== List of works ==
Ballets

Title	Date of first performance	Choreographer	Remarks
Acis and Galatea	10 June 1797	Charles Didelot	
Alonzo the Brave and the Fair Imogene	26 March 1801	Charles Didelot	co-composed with Vincenzo Federici
L’amant statue	21 April 1796	Giacomo Onorati	
L’amour vangé	2 June 1796	Charles Didelot	
Apollon berger	27 December 1796	Sébastian Gallet	
Bacchus and Ariadne	28 November 1797	Sébastian Gallet	
Barader	29 May 1800	James Harvey D'Egville	
La chasse d'amour	2 January 1798	Sébastian Gallet	
Cinderella or The glass slipper	1803?		
Constante et Alcidonis	1798	Sébastian Gallet	
Les délassements militaires	16 January 1797	Sébastian Gallet	co-composed with Joseph Mazzinghi
The deserter	12 February 1799	Sébastian Gallet	based on Pierre-Alexandre Monsigny's music for Le déserteur
Les deux jumelles	1799	James Harvey D'Egville	
Flore et Zephire	7 July 1796	Charles Didelot	
Heliska ou La fille soldat	16 June 1801	Charles Didelot	
L’heureux retour	28 March 1797	Sébastian Gallet	
Hylas et Témire	1799	James Harvey D'Egville	
Irza	2 February 1802	James Harvey D'Egville	
Les jeux d’Eglé	11 January 1800	James Harvey D'Egville	
Jugement de Midas	20 February 1802	James Harvey D'Egville	
Ken-Si and Tao	14 May 1801	Charles Didelot	
Laura et Lenza	8 May 1800	Charles Didelot	
Little Peggy's love	21 April 1796	Charles Didelot	
Le marchand de Smyrne	1799?	Monsieur Barré	
L’offrande a Terpsichore	28 November 1797	Sébastian Gallet	
Pigmalion	3 January 1801	James Harvey D'Egville	
Télémaque	26 March 1799	James Harvey D'Egville	co-composed with James Harvey D'Egville
Le triomphe de Thémis	1798	Sébastian Gallet	

Other works

- Overture to Blue Beard (opera by Michael Kelly) (most vocal scores of the opera have Kelly's own overture)
- Pas de trois from La fille mal gardée (bulk of ballet composed by unidentified composer, 18 April 1799)
- Hornpipe from Barbara and Allen (ballet by James Harvey D'Egville)
- Variations, D minor, piano
