= Michael William Sharp =

English painter

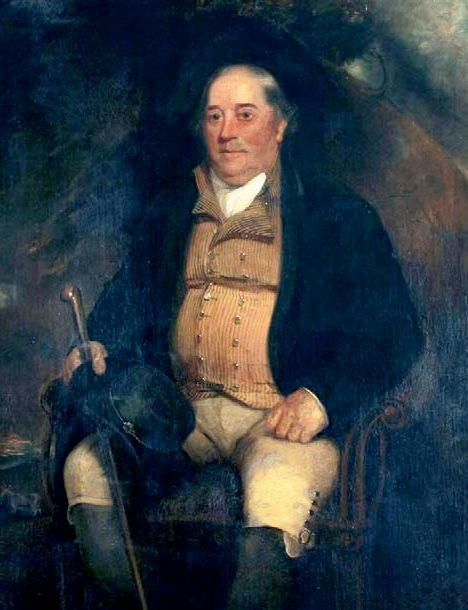
Michael William Sharp, 1805 portrait of Benjamin Jesty

Michael William Sharp (1776? – 1840) was an English painter.

== Life ==
He was born in London, and was a pupil of Sir William Beechey. He also studied in the schools of the Royal Academy. In about 1804 he married the actress and dancer Arabella Menage (1782–1817). In 1813 he was in Norwich, where he lodged with John Crome, perhaps a former teacher, and godfather to one of his sons. He became one of the prominent painters of the Norwich school, with whom he exhibited for some years. Sharp later was in London, and died at Boulogne in 1840.

== Works ==
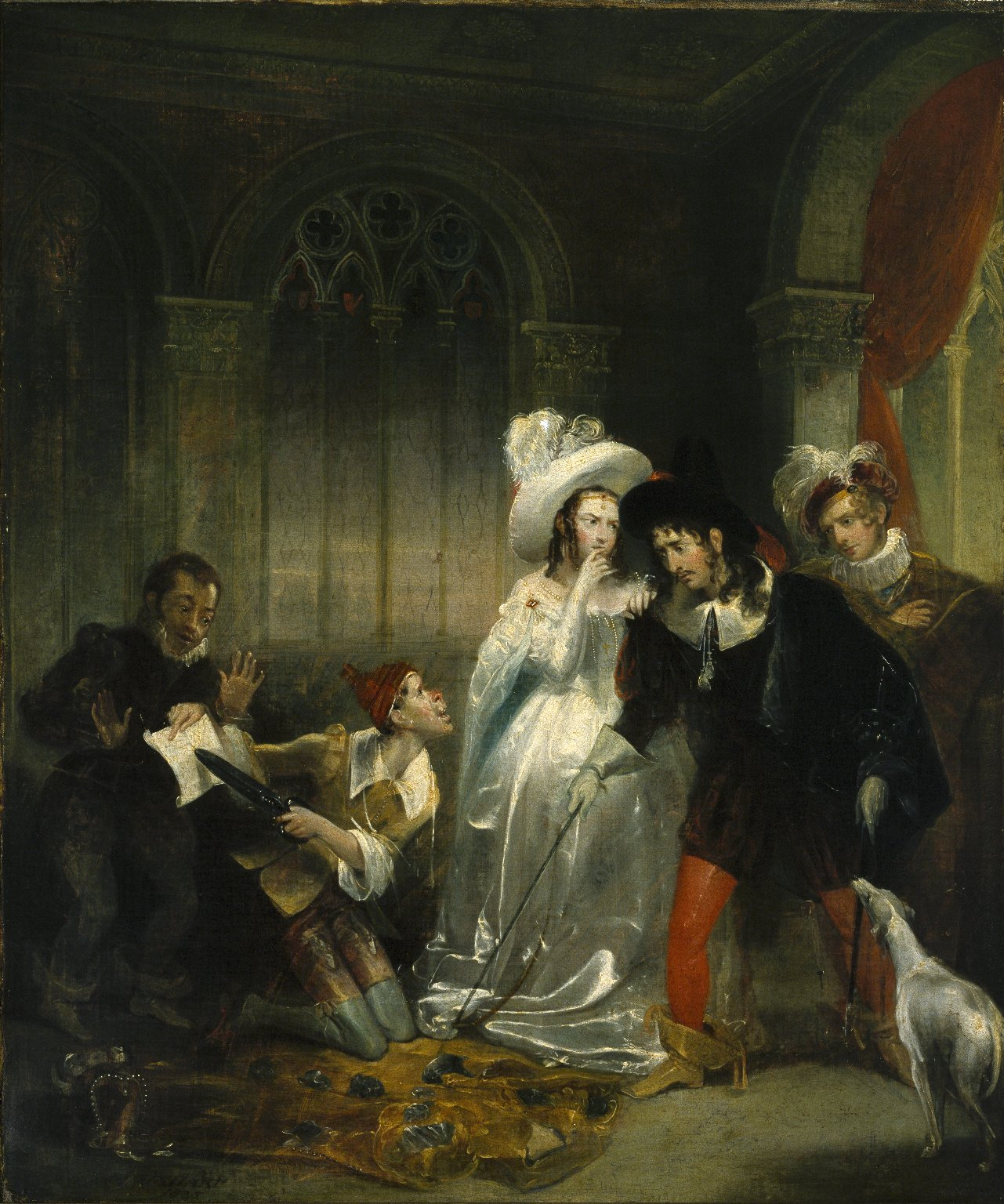
Petruchio and the Tailor, 1835

Sharp appeared as a portrait-painter at the Royal Academy in 1801, but he became known as a painter of small domestic scenes, usually of a humorous character. His works were populist, and successful in his day.

The Music Master, exhibited at the British Institution in 1809, gained a premium and was purchased by Thomas Hope. Sharp obtained many commissions, and his pictures sold well at the exhibitions. Many of them also were engraved, such as Sunday Morning (R.A. 1820), The Sailor's Wedding (R.A. 1828), The Black Draught, and The Spoilt Child.

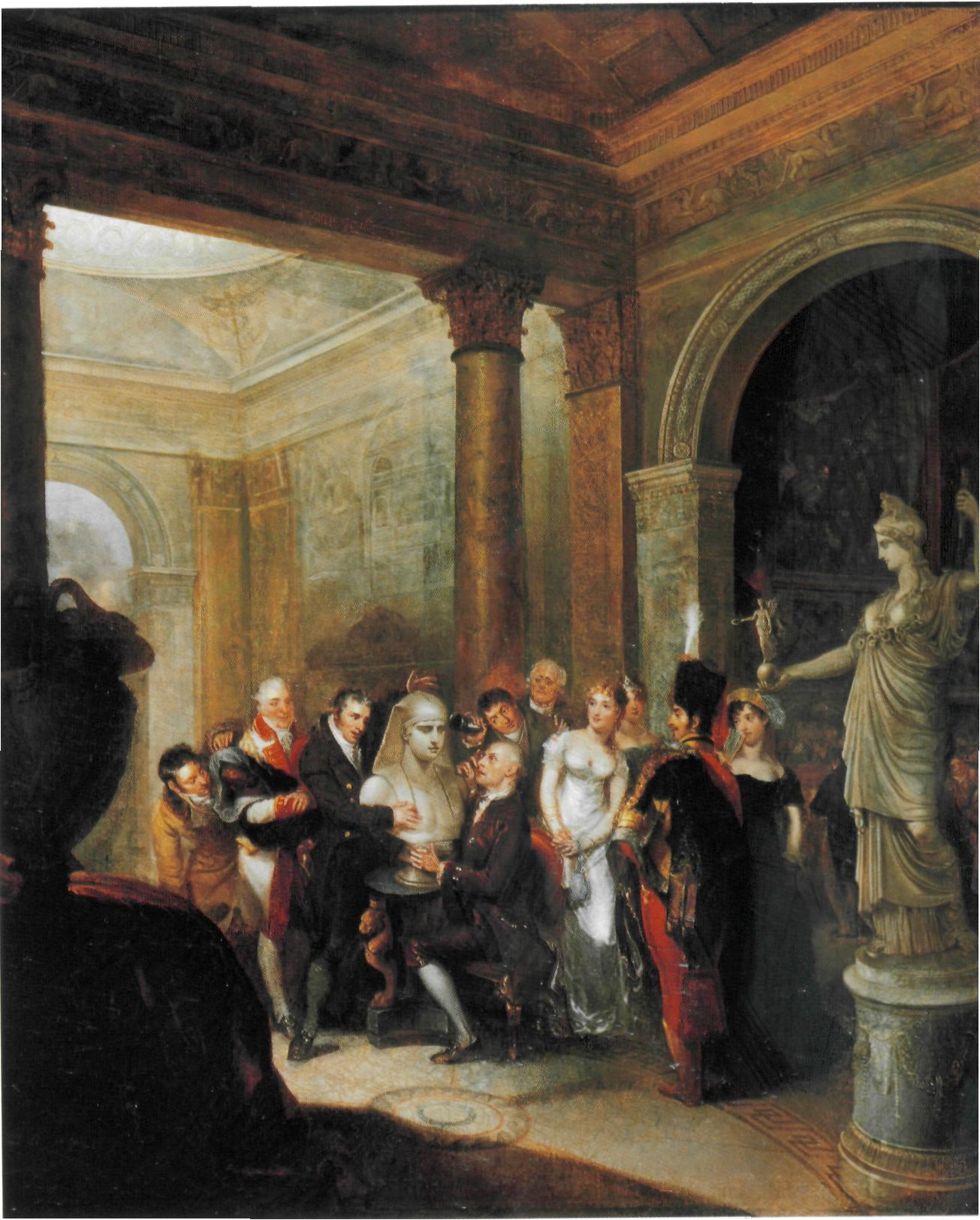
The Connoisseur, a Capriccio Painting with Connoisseurs Admiring Thomas Hope's Antique Sculpturers Signed and Dated Michael William Sharp 1811 (c) Phillips

The Connoisseur, a capriccio painting of Thomas Hope's London Duchess Street Residence and world famous art collections, featured group portraits of Thomas Hope, his wife Louisa, John Keyes, Madam Vestris, and other notables of the day along with costumed members of the Drury Lane Theater Company. Painted in 1811, the large 48 1/2" X 40" canvas was shown in the Annual Exhibition of British Artists in the Gallery of the British Institution in Pall Mall during the summer of 1812. The painting was purchased at the Exhibition, by George Spencer-Churchill, the Marquis of Blandford who would later become the 5th Duke of Marlborough, and this painting would hang on display at the Duke's famous White Knights estate until 1819 when he went bankrupt and all of his possessions were sold at auction.

Sharp also executed for theatrical patrons group portraits of the principal performers on the stage at that time, such as Queen Constance before the Tents of the English and Foreign Sovereigns, painted in 1819; An Author reading his Drama to an Assemblage of the Performers in the Green Room of Drury Lane Theatre; The Shakespeare Jubilee, with Portraits of the principal Covent Garden Performers, and others.

A lecture by Sharp, delivered in 1820 to the Philosophical Society at Norwich, was printed. It is in James Elmes's Annals of the Fine Arts, vols. iv. and v., as An Essay on Gesture.
