= Charles Didelot =

French dancer and choreographer (1767–1837)

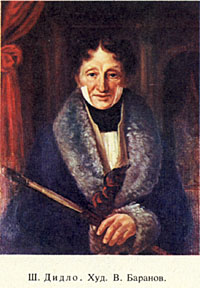
Charles-Louis Didelot, portrait by V. Baranov (c. 1810)

Charles-Louis Didelot (28 March 1767, Stockholm – 7 November 1837, Kiev) was a French dancer and choreographer.

== Biography ==
The son of Charles Didelot, the dance-master of the King of Sweden, he studied dance with his father, who was an instructor in dance at the Swedish Opera, and debuted as dancer in the theatre of Bollhuset in Stockholm 1786.

He then studied in Paris with Jean Dauberval. He followed his study with Jean-Georges Noverre, under whose lead he debuted in London in 1788.

When the Russian Imperial ballet needed a new chief choreographer, the former Imperial choreographer Charles Le Picq proposed inviting Charles Didelot.

He arrived in Saint Petersburg in 1801 at the invitation of the director of the Imperial Theatres and made his debut as the first dancer. His career as a dancer ended in 1806, following an accident to his leg and the death of his wife, Rose, a brilliant ballerina. From then on, Didelot taught dance, having an important influence over the development of ballet.

He received great acclaim for his choreography in Flore et Zéphire in 1796. This production featured dancers on wires (flying machines) in order to create the illusion of weightlessness.

He became the first choreographer who brought a ballerina posing on the pointe (via his "flying machine") – in 1815 in the ballet Flora and Zephyr (1815, Paris), the main parts: Geneviève Gosselin – Flora, Albert – Zephyr, it was not dancing on the pointe, but it was the first release on the pointe (Geneviève Gosselin).

Didelot raised Russian ballet to an unprecedented height, and due to Didelot Russian ballet developed to achieve global importance. He delivered more than 40 full ballets, not counting dances and fragments in other representations.

In the 1830s a foolish quarrel with the Director of the Imperial Theatres (prince Sergei Gagarin) led to Didelot's departure from the Imperial troupe; the Frenchman Alexis-Scipion Blache took his place as chief choreographer.

== Works ==
Bolshoi Theatre, Saint Petersburg

- December 8, 1824: Ruslan and Ludmila to Friedrich Scholz music (together with Auguste, after 1821 ballet by Adam Glushkovsky)
- See Category:Ballets by Charles Didelot

== See also ==
- List of dancers

== Sources ==
- "Дидло, Карл-Людовик" . Brockhaus and Efron Encyclopedic Dictionary (in Russian). 1906.

== See also ==
- Cesare Bossi
