= André-Jean-Jacques Deshayes =

French ballet dancer, choreographer and ballet master (1777-1846)

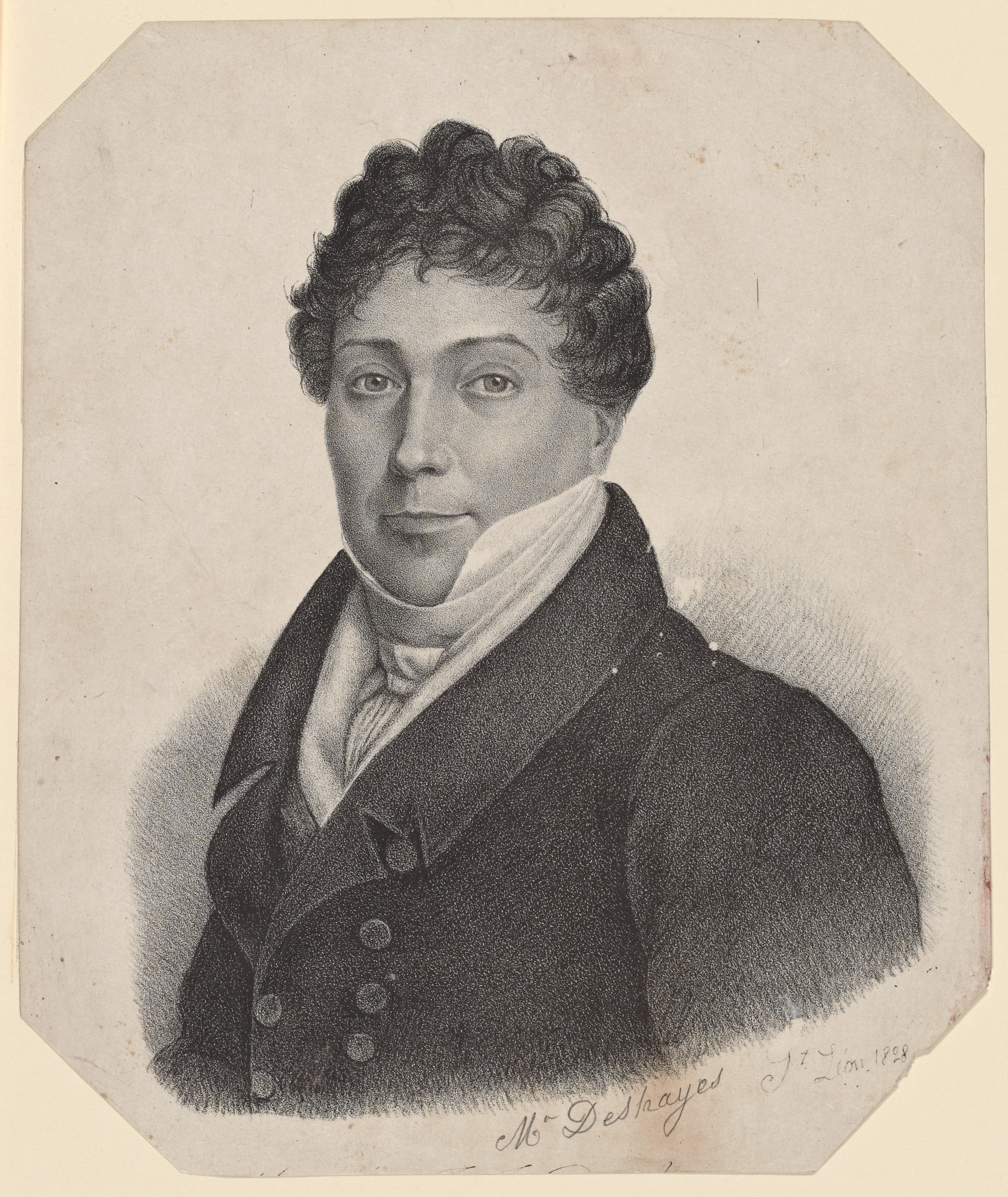
Portrait of Deshayes

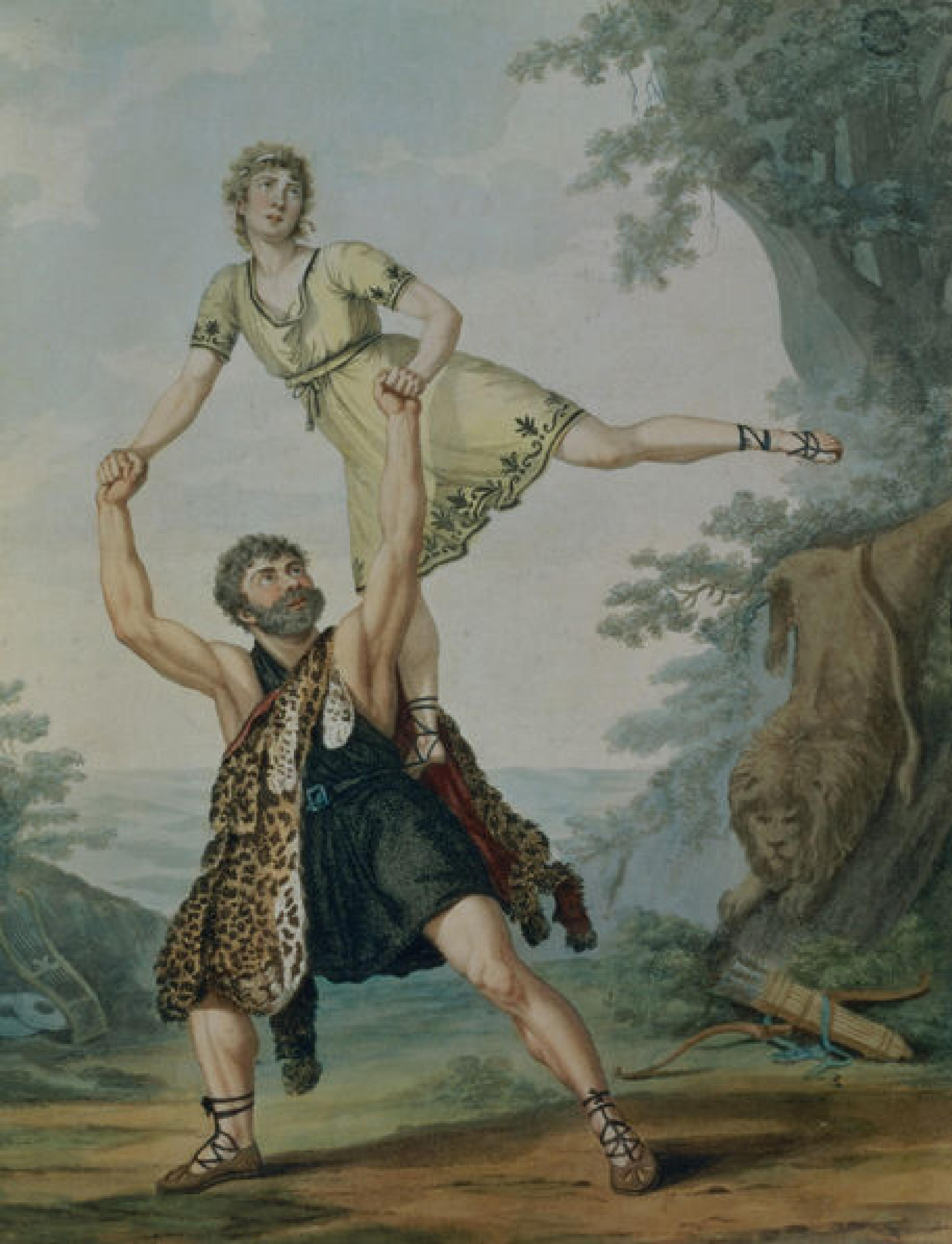
A.J.J. Deshayes as Achilles and James Harvey d'Egville as mentor in a scene from the ballet-pantomime Achille et Diedamie from a painting by Antoine Cardon 1804.

André-Jean-Jacques Deshayes (abbreviated as A.J.J. Deshayes) was a French ballet dancer, choreographer and ballet master born in Paris on 24 January 1777 and died in Batignolles on 10 December 1846.

== Biography ==
The son of the ballet master of the Comédie-Italienne, Jacques-Francois Deshayes, André-Jean-Jacques studied dance with his father, and then at the school of the Paris Opera Ballet from 1788, and debuted there while very young in the roles of children.

Hired by the Opera as Principal Dancer in 1794, under the direction of Pierre Gardel, Deshayes toured abroad, most notably in Lisbon in 1799, then London the following year. After leaving the Opera in 1802, he spent two years at the La Scala in Milan and then danced in Naples and Vienna.

But most of his brilliant career was spent at The King's Theatre in London, where he was principal dancer and choreographer from 1804 to 1842, with some interruptions, including the Napoleonic Wars, which forced him to return to the continent. During these years, he contributed to the development of Romantic ballet in Great Britain.

When he retired in 1842, Deshayes moved back to Paris to what was then the new quarter Batignolles, where he died at the age of 69.

In 1822 he published his Idées générales sur l'Académie royale de musique, et plus spécialement sur la danse (Paris, La Mongie).

== Choreography ==
- 1806: La Dansomanie, after Pierre Gardel (London, King's Theatre)
- 1807: The Rape of Adonis (London, King's Theatre)
- 1810: Psyche, after Pierre Gardel (London, King's Theatre)
- 1811: Figaro, after Louis Duport (London, King's Theatre)
- 1821: The Price (London, King's Theatre)
- 1821: Alcide, with Albert, for the coronation of George IV (London, King's Theatre)
- 1824: Zemire et Azor (Paris Opera)
- 1829: La somnambule, ou L'arrivée d'un nouveau seigneur, after Jean-Pierre Aumer (London, King's Theatre)
- 1829: Masaniello, music by Auber (London, King's Theatre)
- 1831: Kenilworth (London, King's Theatre)
- 1831: La Bayadère (London, King's Theatre)
- 1835: Zephyr Shepherd (London, King's Theatre)
- 1837: Le Brigand de Terracina, music by Auber (London, Her Majesty's Theatre)
- 1842: Giselle with Jules Perrot (London, Her Majesty's Theatre)
- 1842: Alma with Jules Perrot and Fanny Cerrito (London, Her Majesty's Theatre)
