= Carolina Rosati =

Italian ballet dancer (1826–1905)

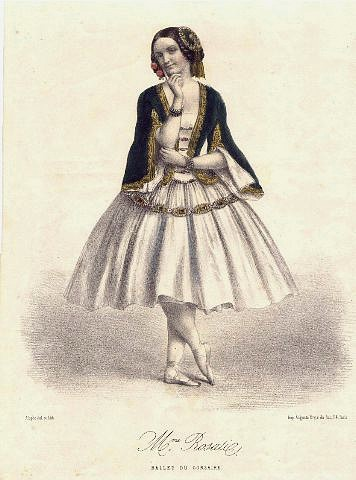
Carolina Rosati (1856) as Médora in Le Corsaire

Carolina Rosati (1826–1905) was an Italian ballet dancer who gained fame with the Paris Opera Ballet and the Imperial Ballet in St Petersburg.

== Early life ==
Carolina Galletti was born in Bologna, Italy, on 13 December 1826. At the age of seven, she began training under Carlo Blasis. After she married her dancing partner Francesco Rosati, she was known as Carolina Rosati.

== Career ==
In 1841, Rosati danced as prima ballerina at the Teatro Apollo in Rome. Two years later she appeared in Trieste and Parma. She danced at La Scala, Milan together with her husband in 1846. The same year she danced Jules Perrot's Pas de Quatre at Her Majesty's Theatre, London, where she also danced Fiorita et la Reine des Elfrides (1848) and La Prima ballerina (1849) which Paul Taglioni had created for her.

She began dancing in Paris in 1851 appearing in a dance sequence in Fromental Halévy's opera La Tempesta. Two years later, after she had danced in Joseph Mazilier's Jovita, ou les Boucaniers, she was engaged by the Paris Opera as their latest star, apparently becoming the highest paid dancer at the time. She created roles in several of Mazilier's ballets in which her sense of drama was revealed to the full, as when she played Amalia in La Fonti (1855) or her highly successful Médora in Le Corsaire (1856). Above all, she received great acclaim in Marco Spada (1857) where she appeared with Amalia Ferraris.

When her rival Angelina Fioretti arrived in Paris in 1859, she left for St Petersburg's Imperial Theatre where she appeared in Jovita and in ballets created for her by Arthur Saint-Léon and Théophile Gautier. In 1862, she danced Aspicia in Marius Petipa's The Pharaoh's Daughter. She also danced all the great classical roles in Paquita, Giselle, Le Cheval de Bronze, La Somnabule and La Esmeralda.

She retired in 1862 and died in Cannes in May 1905.

== Assessment ==
The Oxford Dictionary of Dance describes her as "A plump, vivacious, and graceful dancer ... renowned for the precision of her pointe work, also for her expressive mime."
