= Beecham-Handel suites =

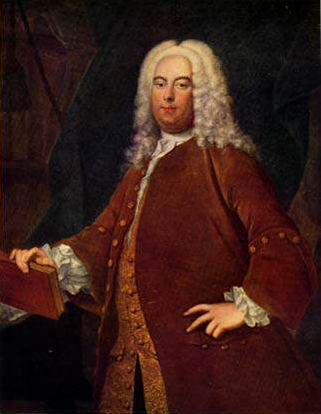
George Frideric Handel

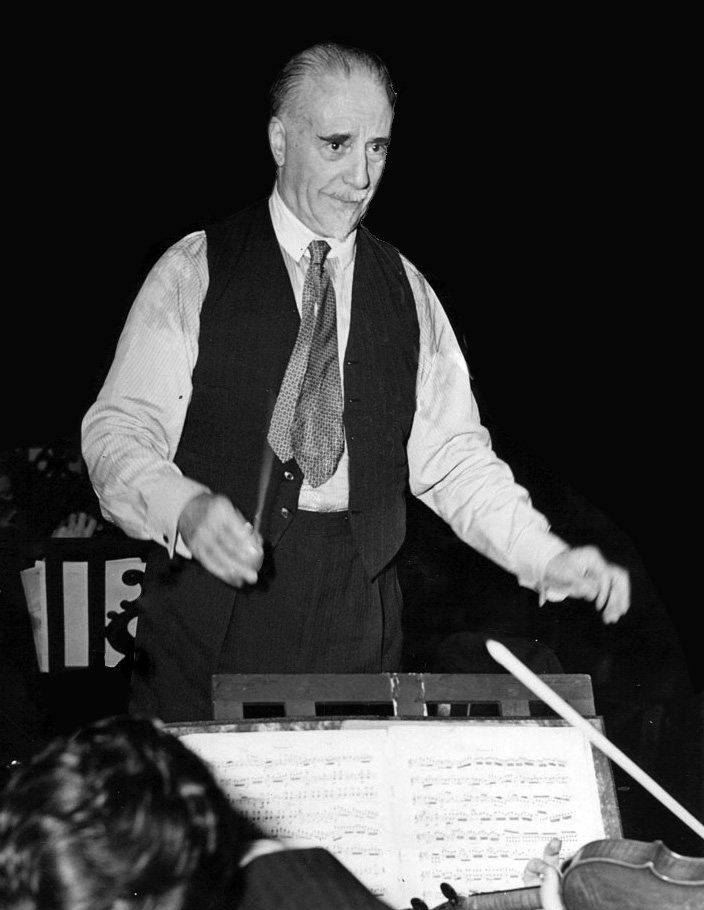
Sir Thomas Beecham

The conductor Sir Thomas Beecham made several orchestral suites from neglected music by George Frideric Handel, mostly from the composer's 42 surviving operas. The best known of the suites are The Gods Go a'Begging (1928), The Origin of Design (1932), The Faithful Shepherd (1940), Amaryllis (1944) and The Great Elopement (1945, later expanded as Love in Bath, 1956).

Some of the suites were written as ballet scores; others were intended for concert use. Beecham made no attempt to emulate Handel's original instrumentation, and employed the full resources of the modern symphony orchestra, introducing such instruments as trombones, cymbals, triangles and harps into the orchestration. He made recordings of parts or the whole of all the above suites with the two orchestras with which he was principally associated, the London Philharmonic between 1932 and 1945 and the Royal Philharmonic thereafter.

Both at the time and in the present day, Beecham's arrangements of Handel have divided opinion. Some critics have found the 20th-century orchestration inappropriate; others have praised Beecham for unearthing long-forgotten music and bringing it before the public. Recordings of the suites, mostly conducted by Beecham between 1932 and 1959, remain in the current catalogues, but the works have dropped out of the general concert repertoire.

== Background ==
After their original performances between 1705 and 1741 Handel's operas had fallen into almost total neglect. Even in his lifetime they had become unfashionable and he had successfully switched to writing oratorios in English. After his death the operas were generally forgotten. The writer Jonathan Keates summed matters up:

Conventional wisdom (a.k.a. cultural indolence and incuriosity) long ago decided that they were resistant to any serious presentation on a contemporary stage. The standard Baroque aria form, with its reprise of the opening material after a middle section in a different key, was felt to be a strain both on dramatic credibility and on an audience's ability to stay awake. … The plots, with their female warriors, magic islands and long-lost brothers identified by strawberry marks, were fatuous, happening in a classical never-never land inhabited by people whose names, Bradamante, Cleofide, Polinesso, sounded like Formula One racing cars or different types of pasta sauce. There were no choruses worth speaking of and hardly any ensembles, while the orchestra was just a mimsy little combo of fiddles and oboes.

Audiences in the 19th century and the first half of the 20th were unaccustomed to harpsichord-accompanied recitatives as numerous and lengthy as those in Handel, and the baroque convention that operatic heroes were performed by castrati was viewed with a mixture of horror and amusement. Keates quotes one Handel scholar as saying, "nowadays there is no humane answer to the castrato problem." There were occasional attempts to revive Handel's operas, but they were rare and were generally regarded as curiosities.

Beecham was among the few who were familiar with Handel's operatic works. He owned scores of thirty-seven of the forty-two surviving operas, and annotated them extensively. (Note: Beecham owned scores of Acis and Galatea, Admeto, Agrippina, Alcina, Alessandro, Almira, Amadigi, Arianna, Ariodante, Arminio, Atalanta, Ezio, Faramondo, Flavio, Floridante, Giulio Cesare, Giustino, Il Parnasso in festa, Il pastor fido, Lotario, Muzio Scevola, Orlando, Partenope, Poro, Radamisto, Riccardo primo, re d'Inghilterra, Rinaldo, Rodelinda, Rodrigo, Scipione, Serse, Silla, Siroe, Sosarme, Tamerlano, Teseo and Tolomeo.) He frequently programmed individual arias from them in his concerts. (Note: Among these operas were Alcina, Acis and Galatea, Alessandro, Il pastor fido, Rodrigo, Sosarme and Teaso.) In addition to this, he believed that another effective way of bringing Handel's forgotten operatic music before the public was to arrange the best of it into concert or ballet suites for large modern orchestras. Like Mozart before him, he had no hesitation in reorchestrating Handel's music to match the available orchestral forces and current musical tastes:

The original Handelian orchestra was composed of a handful of strings and about a dozen reed wind instruments, mainly oboes and bassoons, with an occasional reinforcement of horns, trumpets and drums, restricted by necessity to the somewhat monotonous repetition of tonic and dominant. This makes hard going for any audience asked to listen to it with the opulent sound of a latter-day orchestra well in its ears.

Beecham, maintaining that Handel "revelled in great demonstrations of sound", said he feared that "without some effort along these lines, the greater portion of his magnificent output will remain unplayed, possibly to the satisfaction of drowsy armchair purists, but hardly to the advantage of the keenly alive and enquiring concertgoer."

== Orchestral suites ==
From the 1920s onwards Beecham arranged Handel arias and other pieces into various suites, the best known of which are The Gods Go a'Begging (1928), The Origin of Design (1932), The Faithful Shepherd (1940), and Amaryllis (1944). The suites are impossible to detail definitively as Beecham was in the habit of adding, dropping or changing the order of movements from performance to performance and recording to recording, and his concert and recorded performances frequently differed from the published scores.

The first Handel-Beecham arrangement was given simply as "Suite – Handel" at a concert in February 1924. In April of that year Beecham conducted the London Symphony Orchestra in a recording of the work. The suite consisted of four movements:

1. Air – Lento
2. Hornpipe – Allegro
3. Musette – Poco mosso e tranquillo
4. Bourrée – Allegro

All four movements were reused in later Handel-Beecham suites. The Air became No 5 ("Change of scene") in The Origin of Design; the Hornpipe (not from an opera but from the Concerto grosso Op. 6/7), Musette (from Il pastor fido) and Bourrée (from Rodrigo) all reappeared in The Gods Go a'Begging.

A piano transcription of the suite, by Giulio Confalonieri, was published by Metzler, London, 1925. WorldCat has no record of a published edition of the full orchestral score.

== The Gods Go a'Begging, 1928 ==
In March 1928 Beecham included three Handel pieces in a concert with the New York Philharmonic Orchestra at Carnegie Hall: the overture to Teseo, the musette from Il pastor fido and a bourrée from Rodrigo. According to the musicologist Graham Melville-Mason, these numbers were the germ of Beecham's ballet score, The Gods Go a'Begging. The ballet was commissioned by Serge Diaghilev for his company, the Ballets Russes; it was choreographed by the young George Balanchine. Boris Kochno devised a simple scenario on the lines of an 18th-century fête champêtre, in which a shepherd comes across a nobleman's picnic, spurns the attentions of two ladies in the party and dances instead with a serving maid. The picnic party's indignation is quelled when the shepherd and maid reveal themselves as gods in disguise.

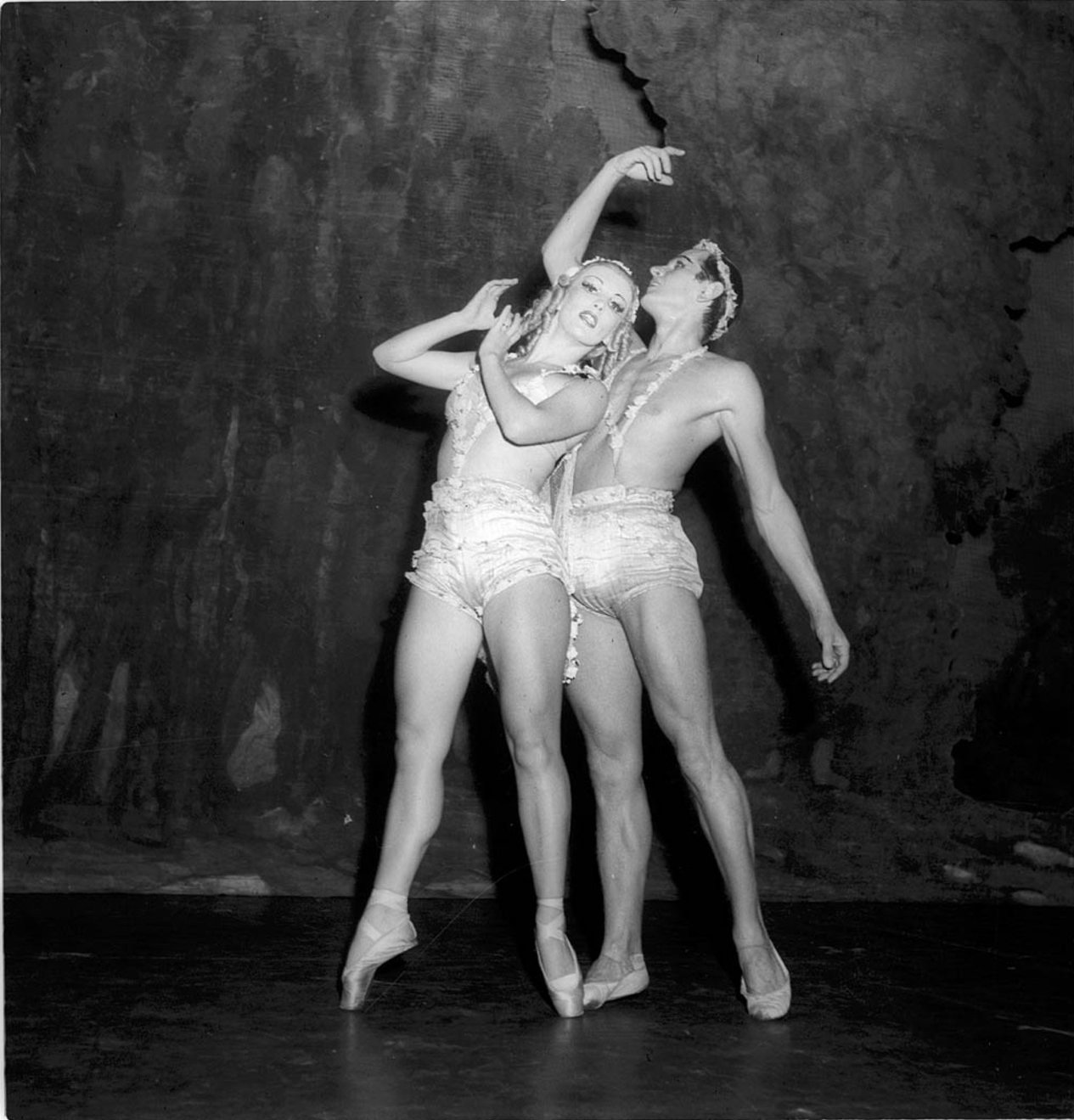
Tatiana Riabouchinska and Roman Jasinski in Les dieux mendiants – The Gods Go a'Begging, c. 1939

For the score, Beecham produced an eleven-movement suite:

1. Introduction (Overture to Act II of Admeto)
2. Allegro (or First Dance or Fugato) (from Overture to Teseo)
3. Minuet (from Alcina)
4. Hornpipe (from Concerto grosso Op. 6/7
5. Musette (from Il pastor fido)
6. Ensemble (or Second Dance) (from Organ Concerto Op. 4/4)
7. Larghetto (or Dream) (from Alcina)
  (a) Tambourine (from Alcina)
8. Gavotte (from Alcina)
9. Dramatico (from Terpsicore)
10. Bourrée (from Rodrigo)

A Sarabande movement was included in Beecham's recording of the suite with the LPO; he later used it in Amaryllis.

The ballet was premiered in July 1928 at His Majesty's Theatre, London, under both the English title and the French – Les dieux mendiants. Beecham conducted, and Alexandra Danilova and Leon Woizikovsky danced the leading roles. It was a considerable success and became a mainstay of the Diaghilev company's repertoire until its disbandment after Diaghilev's death in August 1929. The work was then presented by Wassily de Basil's company. (Note: The edition of the orchestral score published in London by J. B. Cramer in 1929 bore the words "As performed by De Basil's Ballet Russe" [sic] on its title page.)

A new production was staged by the Vic-Wells Ballet at Sadler's Wells Theatre in 1936 with choreography by Ninette de Valois. This version was frequently revived, most recently by the London City Ballet in 1982.

=== Recordings ===
Beecham made three recordings of excerpts from the score.

== The Origin of Design, 1932 ==
In 1930 a suite based on Ariodante was announced, but did not appear. Melville-Mason suggests that Beecham used much of it instead in a ballet score for the Carmago Society, A Woman's Privilege, choreographed by Trudl Dubsky. It was a comedy about exchanged brides, and featured what The Musical Times described as "a pair of low comedy aunts" reminiscent of pantomime dames. The Daily Telegraph described it as "amiable nonsense full of sprightly movement, grotesquely at variance with the beauty and texture of the music". After the first performances, at the Savoy Theatre in November 1931, the ballet was not seen again.

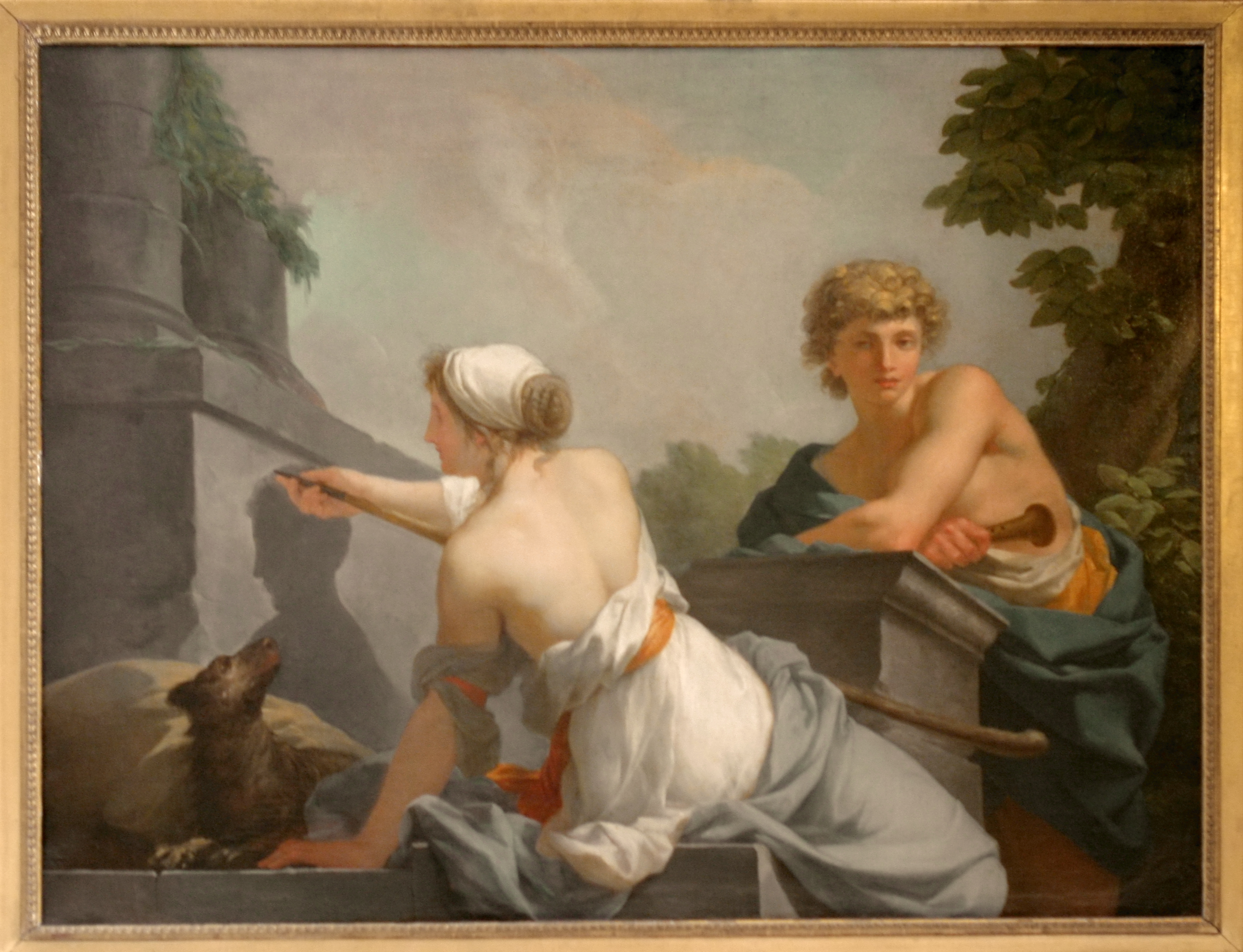
Dibutade ou l'Origine de la peinture, by Jean-Baptiste Regnault

Much of the score for A Woman's Privilege was reused in The Origin of Design, first given at the Savoy in June 1932. The ballet, choreographed by de Valois, and starring Lydia Lopokova and Anton Dolin, had a slender plot inspired by designs by Inigo Jones and adapted by de Valois from Carlo Blasis's treatise The Code of Terpsichore. The god Eros inspires the young Dibutade to draw for herself an image of her lover, Polydore – human kind has discovered art. In the second scene the drawing is carried to the court of Apollo and offered to the god in the presence of the nine Muses. The critic in The Times commented that the plot ran out long before the music. The New York Times said that the piece showed once more Beecham's "rare tact in translating old wine into new bottles."

Beecham's musical assistant, Henry Gibson, worked with him on many of his arrangements, and is credited in the published score of this suite as the compiler and orchestrator. That score contains thirteen movements, of which Beecham and his newly-founded orchestra, the London Philharmonic, recorded ten in December 1932. They made further recordings from the score in 1933 and 1934. The main sources for this score were Ariodante, Il pastor fido, Rinaldo and the ballet music for Terpsicore.

Movements in the 1937 published score.
Scene 1
Eros and Dibutade – Origin of Design

1. Prelude – Allegro moderato
2. Musette – Lentemente (Andante)
3. Rondeau – Entrance of Eros and attendants Moderato giusto
4. Pas de deux – Eros and Dibutade – Allegro moderato
5. Air Lento– Change of scene – Lento espressivo

Scene 2
The Court of Apollo – The Dedication

6. Ensemble and fughetta – Dibutade discovers Polydore at the Court of Apollo – Allegro; Presentation of Dibutade and her design to Apollo and the Muses – Allegro scherzando
  (a) Rondeau – Dance of Eros, joined by Polydore and Dibutade – Moderato
7. Andante quasi allegretto – Polydore, Dibutade and their friends with the attendants on Eros
8. Polydore's dance – Andantino
9. Scherzo – Dibutade's dance – Vivace – Allegro (in this suite the movement is arranged for woodwind and pizzicato strings)
10. Siciliano – Polydore and Dibutade – Andante; Gigue – Eros and attendants with Friends of Dibutade – Allegro
11. Dance of the Muses – Allegro con brio
12. Finale: The Court of Apollo – Allego – piu mosso – presto.

This contrasts with the suite recorded by Beecham with the LPO in 1932:

1. Bourrée (from Ariodante)
2. Rondeau (from Ariodante)
3. Gigue (from Terpsicore)
4. Minuet (from Il pastor fido)
5. Scherzo
6. Sarabande
7. Ensemble
8. Musette (from Ariodante)
9. Battle (from the "Sinfonia Bellica", Giulio Cesare and "Or la Tromba" and "Battaglia", Rinaldo) and Finale (from Ariodante).

== The Faithful Shepherd, 1940 ==
Of all Beecham's Handel suites, this one bears the closest resemblance to the composer's original work. Il pastor fido was first performed at the Queen's Theatre, Haymarket, London in 1712, and revived at the same theatre – by then called the King's – in May 1734 and again later that year. As well as revising the main text, Handel added a ballet, Terpsicore. Most of Beecham's suite is drawn from first and third of Handel's original scores.

1. Introduction and Fugue (from Terpsicore)
2. Adagio (from Il pastor fido 1712 version)
3. Gavotte (from Il pastor fido 1712 version)
4. Bourrée (from Il pastor fido 1734 version)
5. Musette (from Ariodante, and later "He shall feed His flock" from Messiah)
6. Minuet (from Il pastor fido 1734 version)
7. Pastoral (from "Non tardate", Parnasso in Festa, and later "Dryads, Sylvans" from The Triumph of Time and Truth).
8. Finale (from "Ballo" and "March", Il pastor fido 1734 version.

== Amaryllis, 1943 ==
This score, which extensively reused the music of Beecham's earlier suites, was arranged while he was in the US between 1941 and 1944. It is not known to be connected with any proposed ballet, and featured in his concert programmes in America. It was published in 1943.

1. Entrée – Lento
2. Bourrée – Allegro (from No 1 in The Origin of Design)
3. Musette - Andantino (from No 5 in The Faithful Shepherd)
4. Gigue - Allegro non troppo (from No 3 in The Origin of Design)
5. Sarabande - Largo (from an addition to The Gods Go a'Begging)
6. Gavotte - Allegretto
7. Minuet – Lento moderato (from No 6 of The Faithful Shepherd)
8. Scherzo and Trio – Allegro – l'istesso tempo (the same music as 9 in The Origin of Design but differently orchestrated)

=== Recordings ===
Beecham recorded only the Gavotte and Scherzo from Amaryllis. The full suite was recorded by the Royal Philharmonic Orchestra, conducted by Yehudi Menuhin in 1986.

== The Great Elopement (1945) and Love in Bath (1956) ==
Beecham's last suite from Handel was arranged for a projected ballet, to be entitled The Great Elopement. The scenario, conceived and written by Beecham, is loosely based on real events. Set in 18th-century Bath, it depicts the love affair and elopement of the playwright Richard Brinsley Sheridan and Elizabeth Linley (daughter of the composer Thomas Linley), in the elite society of Bath, presided over by the dandy Beau Nash. For financial reasons, the production of the ballet did not materialise, and Beecham instead incorporated the music into his concert programmes and recordings.

The suite was first heard in a broadcast by the American Broadcasting Symphony Orchestra, conducted by Beecham, on 7 April 1945. The first concert performance followed five days later, by the Rochester Philharmonic under Beecham. He continued to include movements from the work in his programmes for the rest of his life, and it featured in his final concert, in May 1960, less than a year before he died.

For the first ten years or so of its existence the suite was programmed and recorded as The Great Elopement. In the mid-1950s, Beecham altered the title to Love in Bath, under which title he made his final recording of the work.

The music is almost all taken from Handel operas. For this ballet he exhumed forgotten numbers from, among others, Ariodante, Il pastor fido, Parnasso in festa and Rodrigo, adding at the climax the only well-known number in the score, the "Largo" – "Ombra mai fu" – from Serse, transcribed for the full orchestra.

1. The Pump Room (after Parnasso in festa)
2. Beau Nash (after "Il dolce foco mio", Rodrigo)
3. The Linleys (after Parnasso in festa)
4. Hunting Dance
5. Love Scene (after Il pastor fido)
6. The Quarrel (after Il pastor fido)
7. The Pump Room (reprise)
8. The Plot
9. The Weary Flunkies
10. The Exquisites (after Parnasso in festa)
11. Second Love Scene (after Rodrigo)
12. March (from a Handel serenade for wind instruments)
13. Sarabande
14. Minuet (after Il pastor fido)
15. Hornpipe (after Il pastor fido)
16. Rondeau (after Ariodante) (Note: Beecham first borrowed this number from Ariodante for the 1932 The Origin of Design.)
17. Gigue (after Rodrigo)
18. March (reprise)
19. Interlude
20. Serenade ("Sospiretto d'un labbro pallido" from Il pastor fido) - with soprano soloist
21. The Elopement (after Parnasso in festa)
22. Discovery—Finale (after Parnasso in festa and Serse)

Source: EMI.

== Notes, references and sources ==
=== Sources ===
- Lucas, John (2008). Thomas Beecham: An Obsession with Music. Woodbridge: Boydell Press. ISBN 978-1-84383-402-1.
