= Pauline Leroux =

French dancer and ballerina

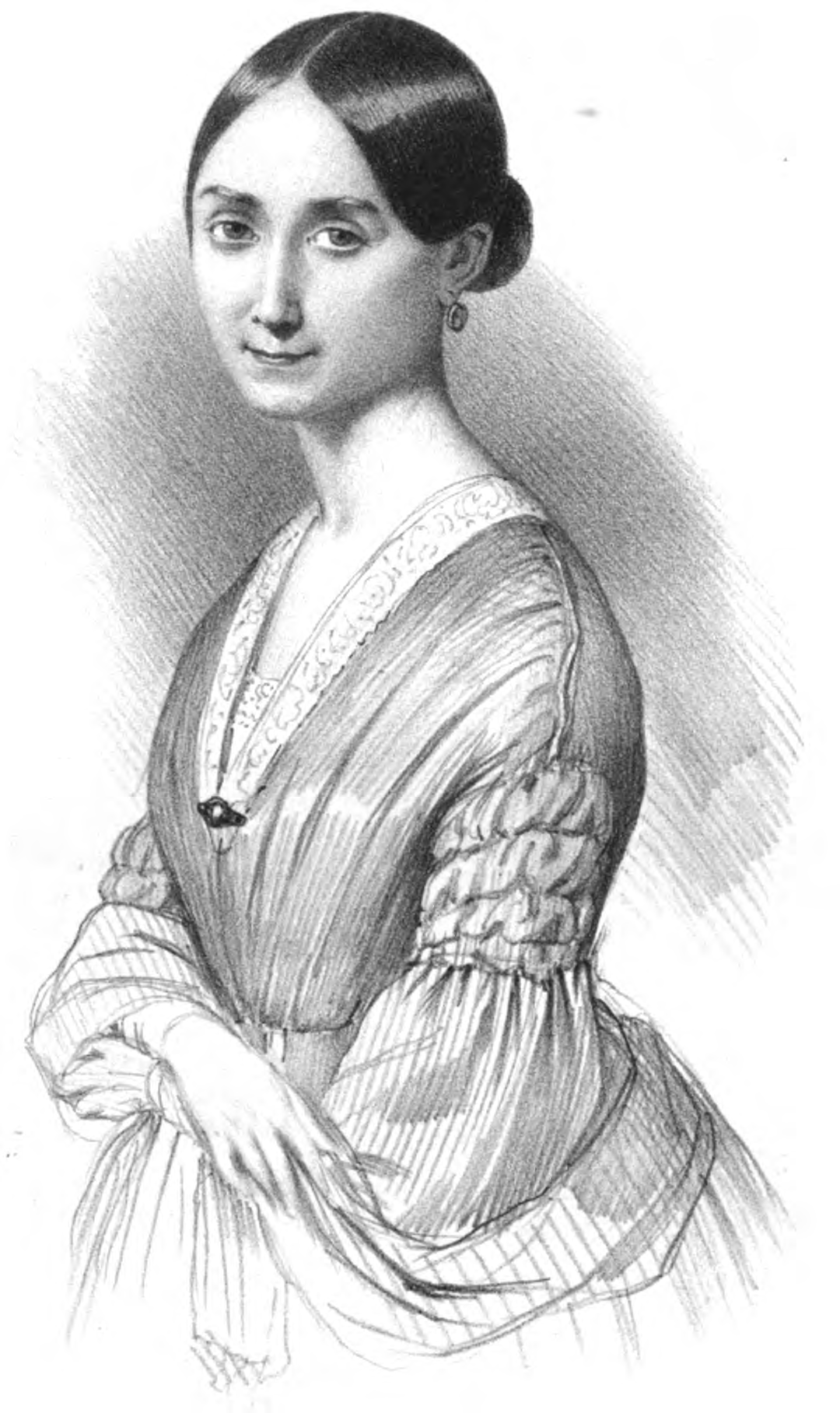
- Pauline Leroux
- Born: Marie Pauline Leroux; August 20, 1809; Paris, France
- Died: June 8, 1891 (aged 81); Paris, France
- Occupation: Ballerina
- Years active: 1826–1844
- Organization: Paris Opéra Ballet
- Spouse: Pierre-Chéri Lafont (actor) (m. 1848)
- Relatives: Françoise-Charlotte Saint-Aubin (grandmother)

Adèle-Louise-Pauline Leroux (19 August 1809–5 February 1891) was a French dancer and ballerina of the 19th-century Romantic ballet era and a member of the Paris Opera Ballet.

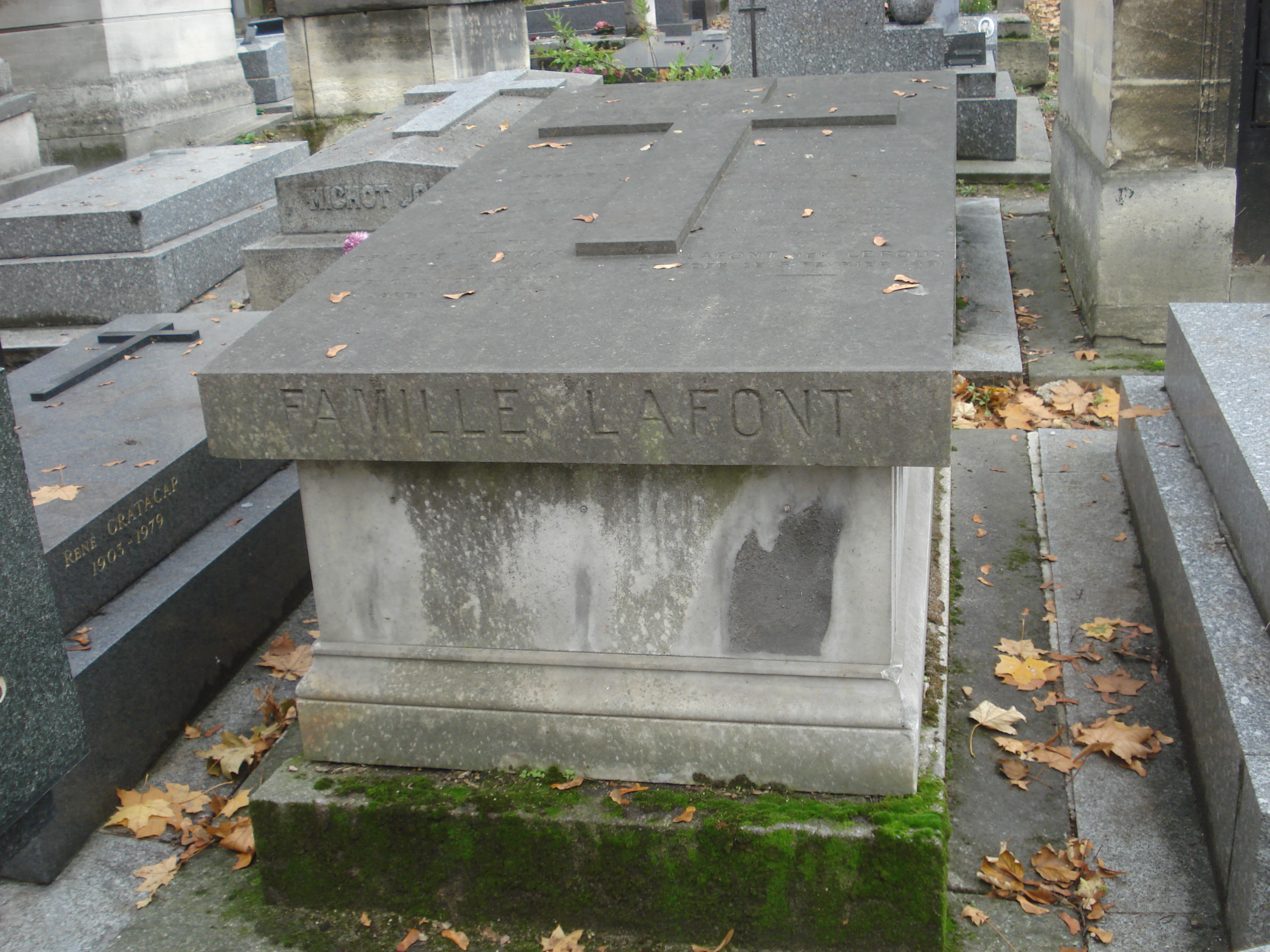
The tomb of Pauline Leroux and Pierre-Chéri Lafont in Montmartre Cemetery

Born in Paris, she was the daughter of Louis-Bénigne-Marie Leroux, Commissioner of War, and Marguerite-Suzanne (née Lecocq). Her older sister Antoinette-Désirée Leroux (1807-?) had been a dancer at the Opera from 1821 to 1827, while her sister Aminthe Delisle-Leroux (1815-1878) was an actress. On 12 July 1848 she married the actor Pierre-Chéri Lafont (1797-1873).

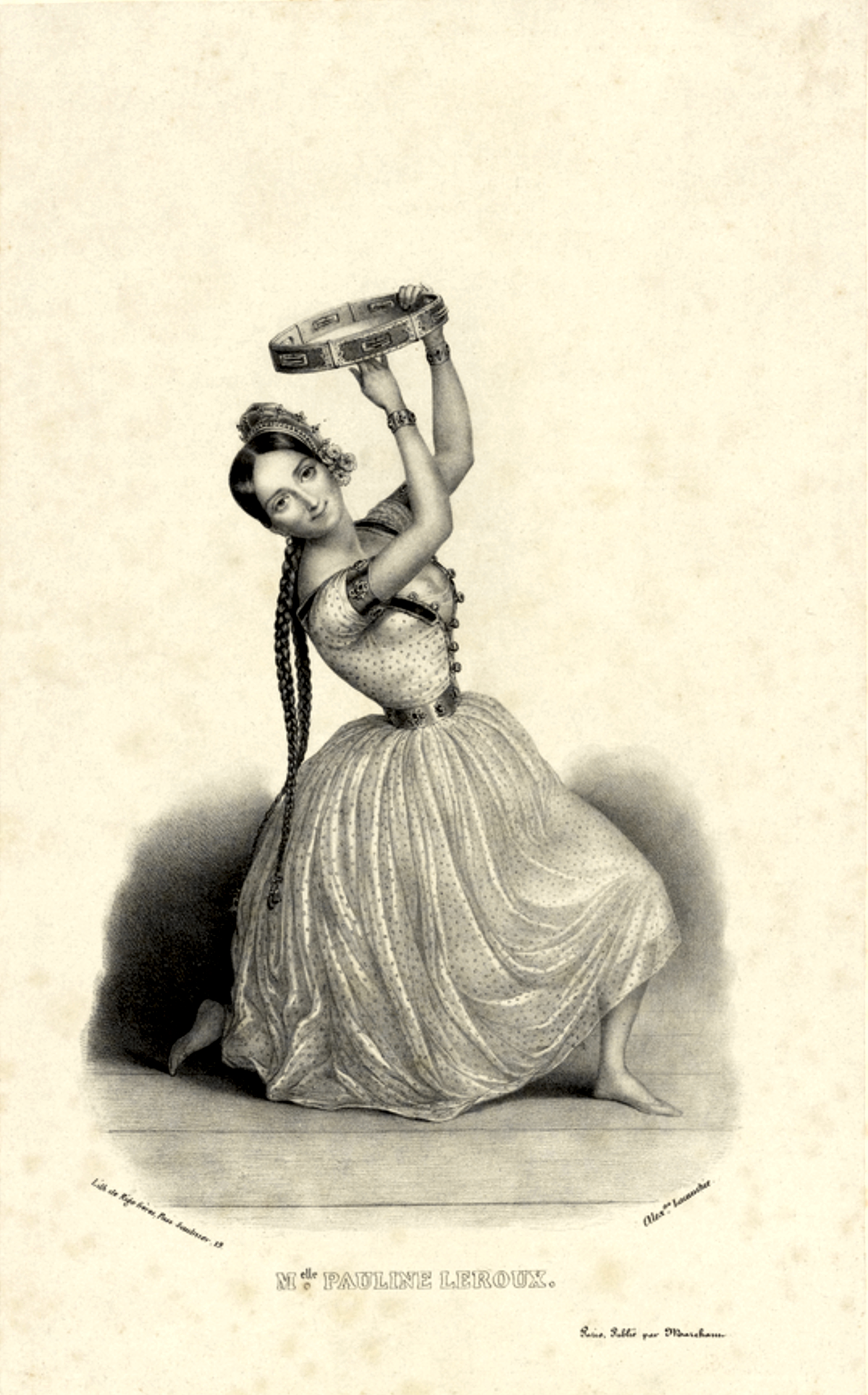
Pauline Leroux, dancing

Leroux was a pupil of Auguste Vestris and Jean-François Coulon and was a member of the Paris Opera Ballet from 1826 to 1837, then from 1840 to 1844 to replace foreign celebrities like Marie Taglioni and Fanny Elssler. She then joined full international tours. Leroux had her first success when she created the role of Marie in La tentation by Jean Coralli (1832), then in Filippo Taglioni's Leda, the Swiss Milkmaid (1832) and triumphed in Coralli's Le Diable Boiteux (1836), then as Uriel in The Devil in Love with Joseph Mazilier (1840). She danced regularly in London between 1824 and 1833, appearing before a young Princess Victoria who painted watercolour portraits of Leroux as Fenella in Massaniello at the Royal Opera House at Covent Garden (1832), as she appeared in La Somnambule (1833) at the King's Theatre, and as Effie in La Sylphide, again at the King's Theatre (1833). Princess Victoria made a doll of Leroux as she appeared in Massaniello and kept it among the over one hundred dolls she made with the help of her governess Baroness Louise Lehzen. Today this doll remains in the Royal Collection. In 1841 Leroux danced in the original production of the grand opera La reine de Chypre by Fromental Halévy and Jules-Henri Vernoy de Saint-Georges. The composer Richard Wagner was in the audience on the first night. In her later years Leroux was a choreographer.

Pauline Leroux died in 1891 in the 9th arrondissement of Paris and is buried in Montmartre Cemetery with her husband Pierre-Chéri Lafont.

== See also ==
- Women in dance

== Sources ==
- Histoire des théâtres depuis leur fondation jusqu'à nos jours, biographie des acteurs et actrices de Paris et de la banlieue : première année, 1844-1845 par Adolphe Bréant de, (1845), page 35
- Ces demoiselles de l'Opéra, (1887), page 118
- Théâtres, acteurs et actrices de Paris : biographie des artistes dramatiques, et notices historiques sur les théâtres de Paris, leur origine, leur administration, etc., par Poujol Adolphe; (1842), page 15
- Galerie de la presse, de la littérature et des beaux-arts, Partie 3; Louis Huart, Charles Philipon; (1841), avec son portrait
- Biographie des acteurs de Paris par Edmond Burat de Gurgy; (1837), page 34
