= Marietta Baderna =

Italian ballerina (1828–1892)

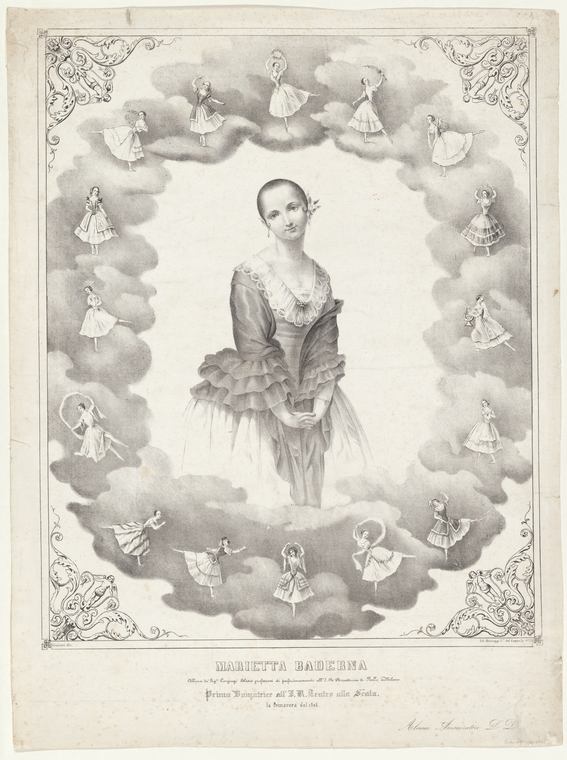
- Marietta Baderna portrait in centre, surrounded by dance poses from her most renowned performances
- Born: Castel San Giovanni
- Died: c. 1892
- Occupation: Dancer, ballet dancer

Marietta Baderna Giannini or Maria Baderna was an Italian ballerina, born in 1828, died c. 1892. At age 16 she was the principal dancer at La Scala in Milan, when the unusual lithograph of her, surrounded by 16 poses, was published. She appeared in Drury Lane, when Carlo Blasis was guest choreographer there. On her first appearance there, in a new ballet The Pretty Sicilian in 1847, one reviewer saw room for improvement:

"In form she is petite, her features are most expressive and pleasing. She wears her hair in the most trying of all fashions-- the Chinese, but, withal, looks sweetly pretty; as candid critics we are bound to say there was nothing astonishing in her execution - it wanted that neatness which her predecessor, Fuoco, so eminently possessed. Still, it must be remembered that she is very young, and practice will make perfect for she is most graceful, especially in the position of that most difficult portion of the human frame divine - her arms. Even as the ballet proceeded we thought we saw improvement, for in the pas de deux with the Count (Mons. Croce) she was deservedly and enthusiastically applauded."

Another critic, at the same performance, called her 'the heroine of the evening, and was more impressed:

“As yet she is not perfect, but she has every promise of becoming eventually first-rate. She has sure and neat, if not astonishing, execution, she pirouettes well, though too often; points well, and not too often; uses her arms with classical grace, displays an abandon and degage manner that is perfectly charming, and dances with invariable artistic feeling. [...] Mdlle. Baderna was loudly, constantly, and deservedly applauded in her introductory pas, which was quaint and original, in the grand pas seul, in which she evinced the most graceful characteristics of her style, and the pas de deux with M. Croce, which was full of excellent poses, and replete with well considered and perfectly executed mechanical feats. Her success was decided, and she was recalled at the end of her pas de deux with M. Croce and after the fall of the curtain.”

Baderna's success continued with a triumphant appearance at Drury Lane in front of Prince Albert:

"A divertisement followed the opera, in the course of which Mademoiselle Marietta Baderna danced the Chachoucha, with such elegance and vivacity as to obtain an encore, which was joined in from the Royal box. After this the illustrious visitors retired, at half-past ten o'clock, leaving the new ballet, Spanish Gallantries, to be performed. The house was very fully attended."

Baderna appeared in L'Odalisque and La Peri at Covent Garden.

In 1850, Baderna moved to South America, giving performances in Rio de Janeiro, and lost her father to a yellow fever epidemic. She was listed in the accounts of the Teatro di São Pedro de Alcântara as having the fourth highest salary, coming below only the two leading sopranos and the leading tenor. She was still active in the mid-1860s in Rio, but died around 1892.

== Legacy ==
Her willingness to perform dances with the enslaved people of Brazil in her early years living there, as well as her incorporation of elements of the Afro-Brazilian Lundu dance into her choreography, caused some scandal at the time. This has led to her name 'baderna' becoming a byword for 'commotion' in Brazilian Portuguese.

For the 2025 edition of the Carnival parade of the Rio de Janeiro samba schools União da Ilha do Governador dedicated their performance to Baderna's memory, exalting her as the 'people's ballerina.'
