= Sofia Fuoco =

Italian ballerina (1830–1916)

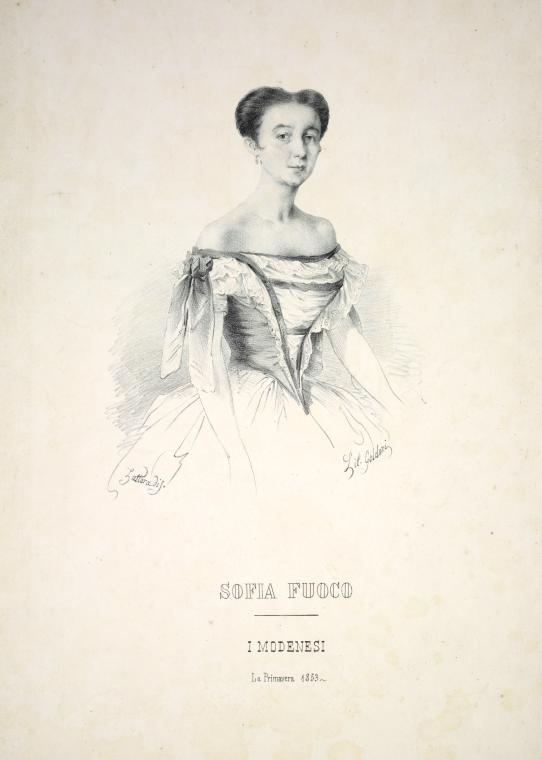
- Born: Maria Brambilla; 16 January 1830; Milan, Kingdom of Lombardy–Venetia
- Died: 16 June 1916 (aged 86); Carate Urio, Province of Como
- Occupation: danseuse
- Years active: 1843–1850s
- Known for: Pointe technique

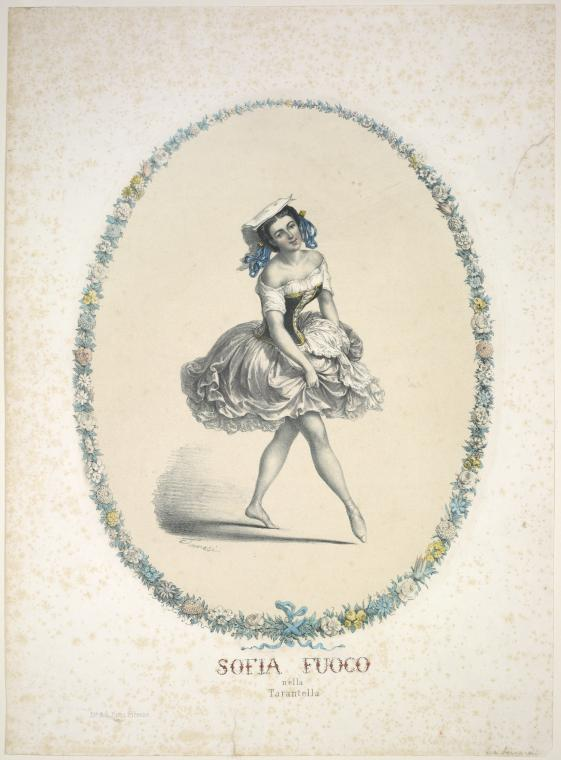
Sofia Fuoco in a tarantella

Sofia Fuoco (16 January 1830 in Milan, the Kingdom of Lombardy–Venetia – 16 June 1916 in Carate Urio, the Province of Como), was an Italian ballerina, born as Maria Brambilla; her stage name, Fuoco (the mother's family name, given because there was more than one "Maria Brambilla" at the dance school) means ″Fire″ in Italian.

== Biography ==
Brambilla was born in Milan. She began to study ballet with Carlo Blasis in c. 1837 and later became one of his so-called Pleiades dancers. In 1839 at age of nine she made her first stage appearance in the Teatro alla Scala. In 1843 when she was only thirteen she was named the prima ballerina assoluta of the theater. Same year she was the first one who danced Giselle in Milan. In 1846 she danced in Perrot's Pas de Quatre staged in La Scala by Filippo Taglioni.

In 1846, age sixteen, she was invited to the Paris National Theatre to replace Carlotta Grisi. Choreographer Joseph Mazilier was going to stage his new ballet Betty with Grisi however the ballerina had signed a contract with the Roman Apollo Theater. Parisian press started to discuss amazing technique and pirouettes of Fuoco before her first performance at the Salle Le Peletier.

She impressed audiences rather with her strong ballet technique than with acting. Due to her amazing pointe work she was nicknamed La Pointue in Paris. According to Théophile Gautier her feet were flying off the floor like steel arrows.

Fuoco was a soloist of the Paris Opera Ballet till 1850. In 1847–1848 she performed in London. In the beginning of 1850s she was a principal dancer of Madrid's Teatro del Circo. Here she has a rivaling with Marie Guy-Stéphan, a favourite of Marquis de Salamanca. When Fuoco became a favorite dancer of general Narvaez theatrical rivalry turned into a political one. The supporters of Marquis de Salamanca (and those of Guy-Stéphan) demonstrated their notion by wearing white carnation flowers in the buttonhole, those who preferred the government (and Fuoco) were wearing red ones, while the ladies had been coiffed à la Fuoco.

In 1852 she was dancing at the Teatro Argentina in Rome. She had retired by the end of the 1850s.
