= Amalia Ferraris =

Italian dancer

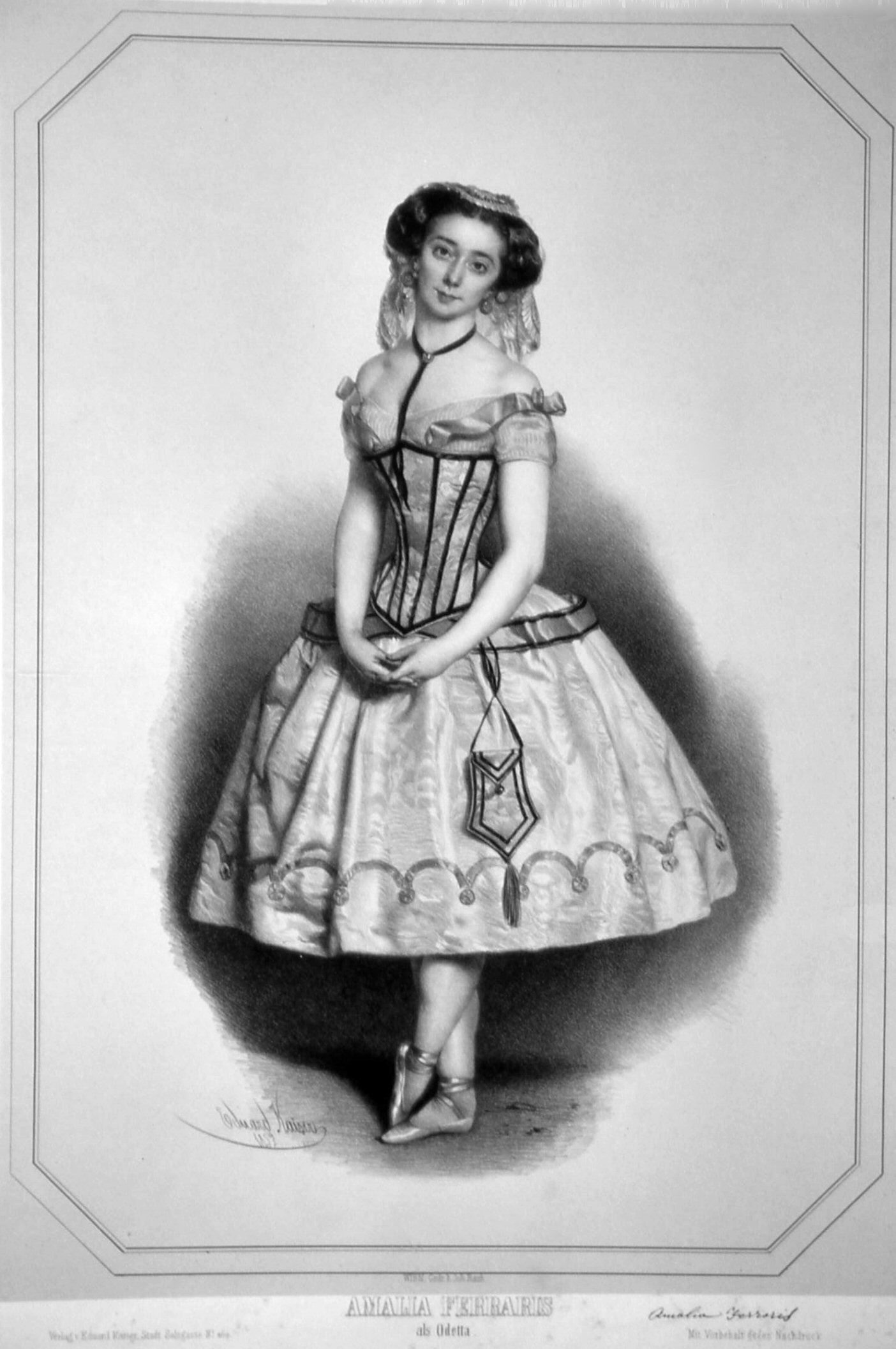
Amalia Ferraris, lithograph by Eduard Kaiser, 1852

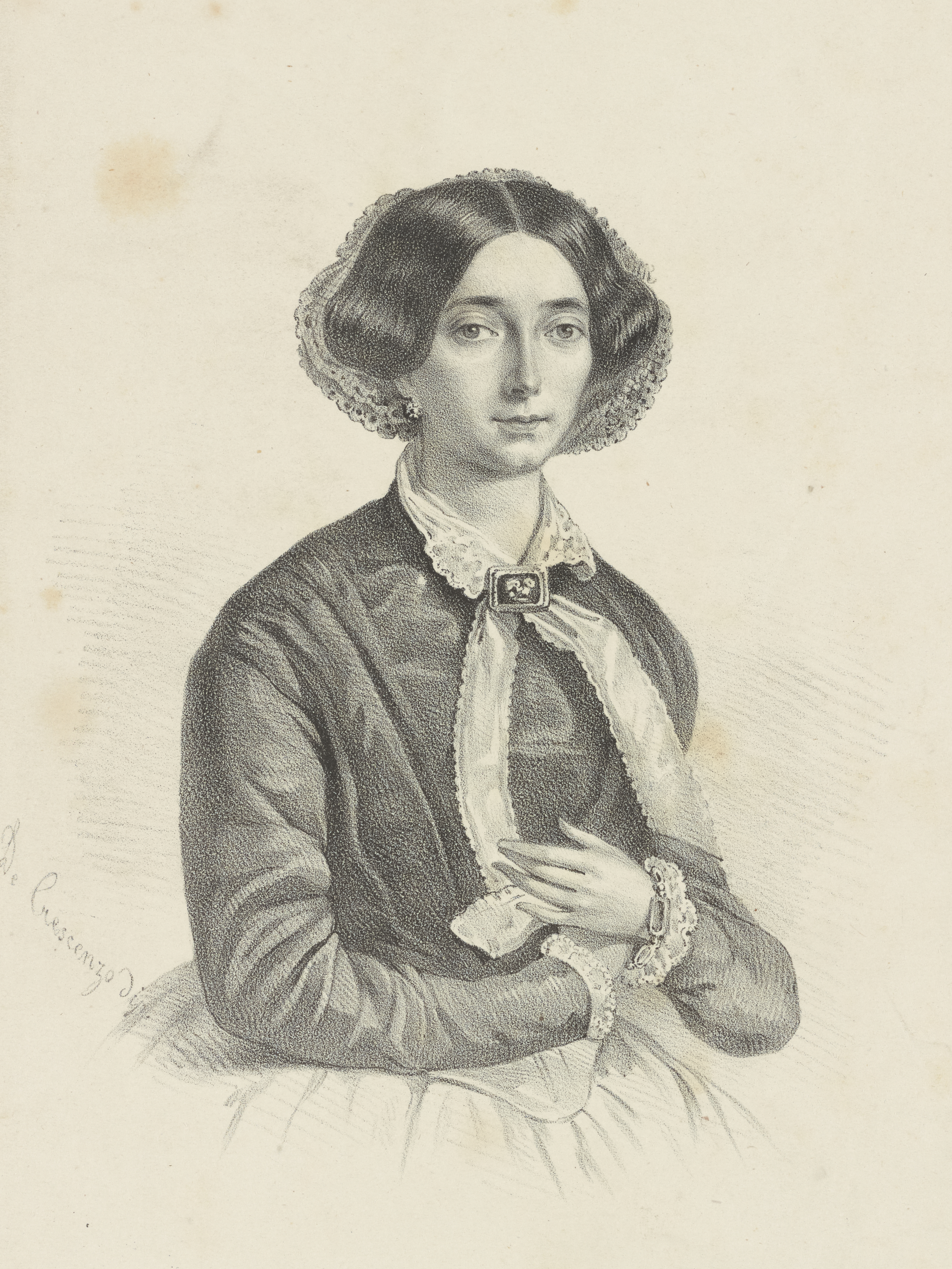
Amalia Ferraris, 1852

Amalia Ferraris (1828 in Voghera – 8 February 1904, in Florence) was an Italian dancer.

== Biography ==
Her year of birth may have been 1828, 1830, or 1832. After studying in Turin, she attended the ballet school at La Scala Academy, under the direction of the Carlo Blasis; she debuted in Milan. Ferraris danced at the Teatro di San Carlo in Naples and then throughout Europe.

In 1848, she joined the Theatre Royal in London, and performed on the occasion of The Great Exhibition. After successful performances in London (1853), Rome (1854), and Vienna (1855), Ferraris performed at the Paris Opera in 1856. Together with Carolina Rosati, her artistic rival, Ferraris was one of the most notable Italian dancers of her era. In 1857, she performed with Rosati at the Paris Opera in the ballet Marco Spada, ou La Fille du Bandit. ~It was said to have been commissioned by Napoleon III for Ferraris and Rosati, who were considered to be the most celebrated ballerinas at the time. Along with Rosati, Giuseppina Bozzacchi, and Fanny Cerrito, Ferraris was considered an Italian virtuosity, known for "bravura displays of technique". According to Lillian Moore, Ferraris "could leap like a fawn and descend like a falling leaf".

In 1859, she made her debut with the Imperial Ballet in St. Petersburg, where she performed in several ballets. It was for Ferraris that the choreographer Marius Petipa created the Carnaval In Venice pas de deux to music by Cesare Pugni, which the composer based on Niccolò Paganini's Il Carnevale di Venezia as an ode to the Italian ballerina. The pas de deux was later added to the ballet Satanella in 1866, where it acquired its more well-known title, the Satanella pas de deux. This pas de deux is still performed throughout the world today.
