= Flora Fabbri =

19th-century ballet dancer

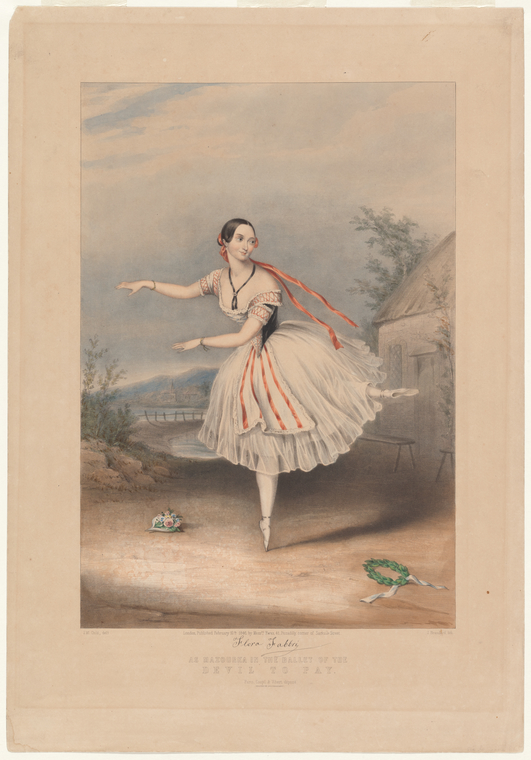
- Flora Fabbri dancing in the ballet The Devil to Pay
- Occupation: Ballet dancer

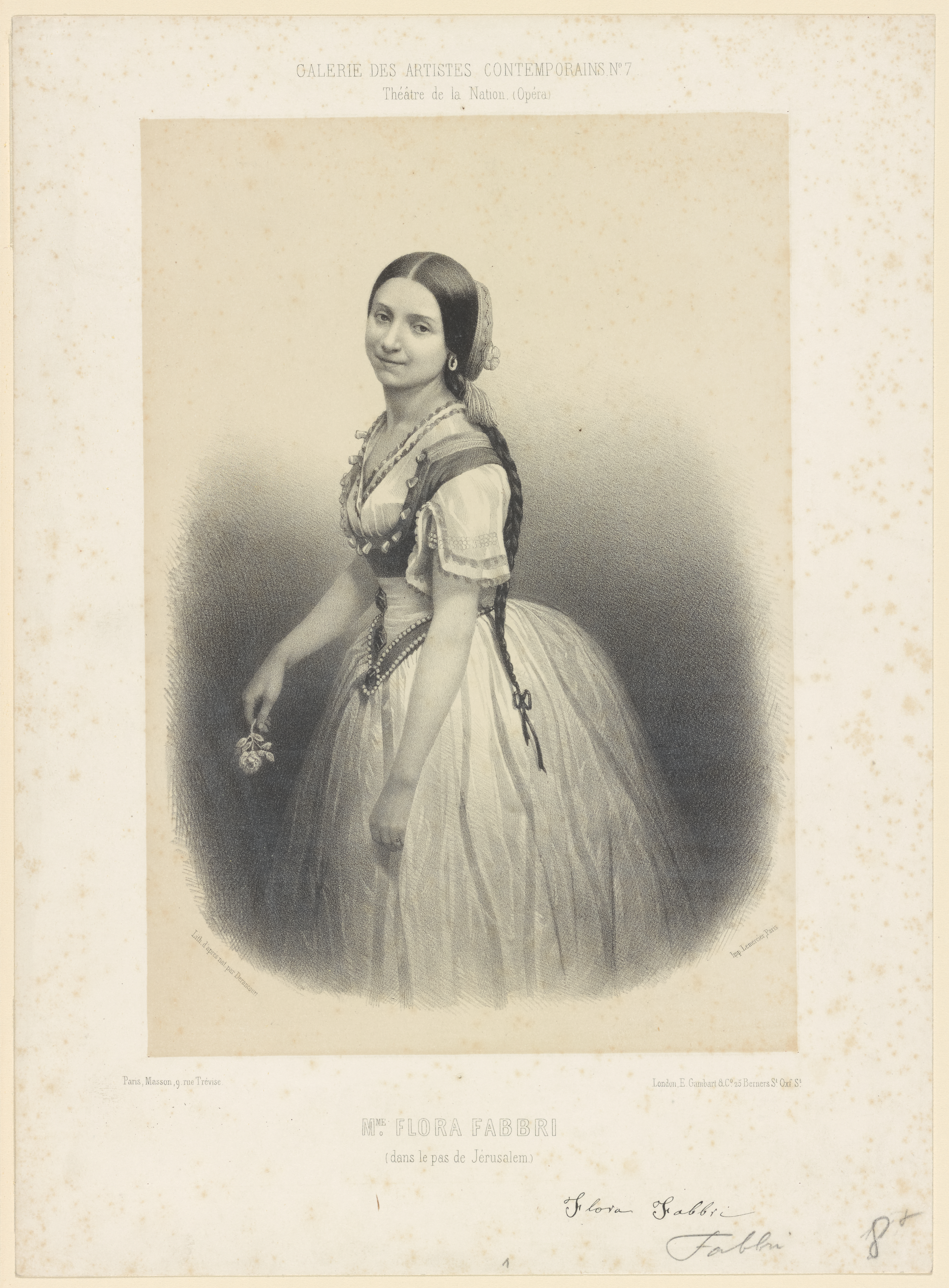
Mme. Flora Fabbri (dans le pas de Jérusalem) (NYPL b12148313-5234919)

Flora Fabbri was a 19th-century Italian romantic ballet dancer. She was trained by Carlo Blasis, and was one of his 'Les Pleiades', being the first among those to become internationally famous. Fabbri danced to acclaim in Italy and Paris, before her London debut at Drury Lane Theatre in 1845, dancing as Mazourka in the ballet The Devil to Pay.

== Life ==
Fabbri was born in Florence between 800 and 1825, although the date exact is unknown. Her father was Giovanni Fabbri was a well-known choreographer, and also the son of successful choreographer. Her mother was Adele Fallani.

Fabbri began dancing at the age of five, training with A. Torelli in Florence, and within a few months was sent to the imperial and royal school of Milan, where she trained under Carlo Blasis. Fabbir was one of Blasis's 'Les Pleiades', being the first among those to become internationally famous, debuting in 1837. Fabbri danced to acclaim in Italy and Paris, before her London debut at Drury Lane Theatre in 1845, dancing as Mazourka in the ballet The Devil to Pay.

One critic wrote "Drury Lane Theatre opened for the season... with a ballet of no particular merit, but worthy of notice for the excellent dancing of Mademoiselle Flora Fabbri. This young lady has more than confirmed the favourable impression of last season. Her manner is at once refined and spirited, singularly graceful and yet always joyous, and impulsive."

Of Fabbri's dancing, Blasis said "light, bounding, aerial, and fanciful in every motion." Fabbri danced at the Paris Opera during 1845 to 1851, and also toured in Italy and Germany. She was also engaged at La Fenice in Venice.

Fabbri retired from dancing in 1860, and lived in Robella, in the province of Asti. Her date of death is unknown.
