= Marie Guy-Stéphan =

French dancer

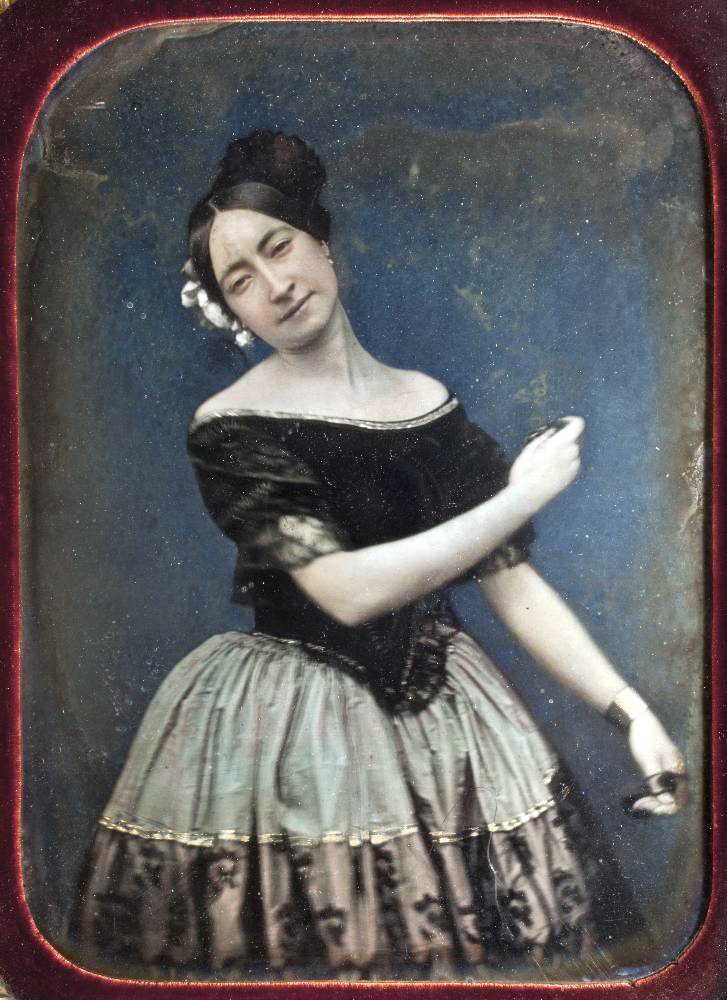
- Hand-coloured daguerreotype portrait of a bolero dancer with castanets, c. 1850. The original piece is preserved in the Photo Library IPCE (Institute of Cultural Heritage of Spain) in Madrid. It's a whole plate daguerreotype, the maximum size standard. It is a masterpiece of the History of Photography.
- Born: Marie-Antoinette Guy-Stéphan; 18 November 1818; Paris, France
- Died: 20 August 1873 (aged 54); Paris, France
- Occupation: Dancer
- Years active: 1843-1851
- Career
- Dances: Bolero School

Marie-Antoinette Guy-Stéphan (18 November 1818 - 20 August 1873) was a French dancer who triumphed at Spanish theaters between 1843 and 1851.

Richard Ford, travel writer, arrived in Spain in 1830 and wrote about the rivalry between Guy-Stéphan and Maria Brambilla, specialist in Donizetti and first dancer of La Scala.

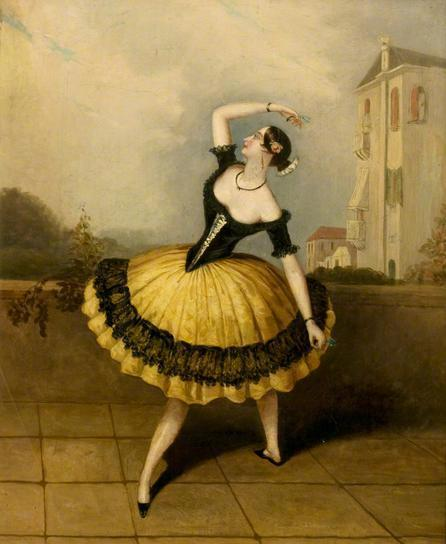
Guy-Stéphan dancing 'Las Boleras de Cadiz' in London in 1843

She debuted in Madrid in 1840 and around 1844 danced the title role for the first production of Giselle in Spain. She performed in numerous works by Marius Petipa and was often partnered with him. In the beginning of 1850s in Madrid's Teatro del Circo she has a rivaling with Sofia Fuoco. Guy-Stéphan was a favourite of Marquis de Salamanca so when Fuoco became a favorite dancer of general Narvaez theatrical rivalry turned into a political one. Those who preferred the government (and Fuoco) were wearing red carnation flowers in the buttonhole while the supporters of Marquis de Salamanca (and Guy-Stéphan) demonstrated their notion by wearing white ones.

In 1853 she moved to Paris and made her Paris Opéra debut in Aelia et Mysis, by Mazilier. She performed at Théâtre Lyrique and at Théâtre de la Gaîté around same time. She created roles including in Néméa, ou l'Amour vengé (1864), by Arthur Saint-Léon.

Cyril W. Beaumont had a painting after J. H. Lynch showing Guy-Stéphan dancing 'Las Boleras de Cadiz' from the ballet divertissement L'Aurore at Her Majesty's Theatre in London in 1843 (now in the collection of the Victoria & Albert Museum), and an engraving of Guy-Stéphan dancing in the same ballet appears in La Ilustración of 23 March 1850. There is also an 1850 daguerreotype showing a dancer with castanets who has been identified as Marie Guy-Stéphan.
