= Love in Bath =

Orchestral suite

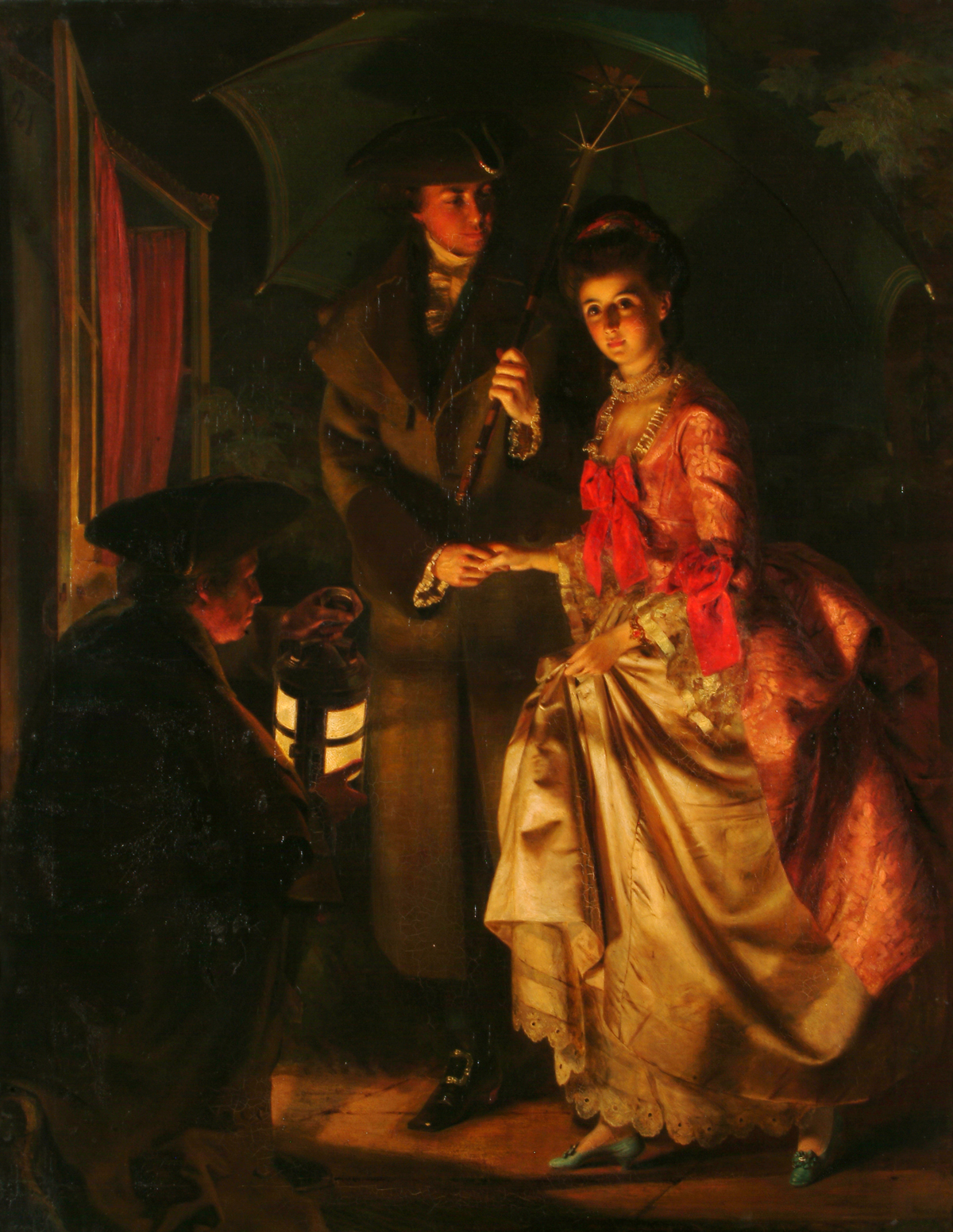
Sheridan and Elizabeth Linley's elopement – inspiration for Love in Bath

Love in Bath is an orchestral suite, with one vocal number, arranged in 1945 from the music of George Frideric Handel by the conductor Sir Thomas Beecham for a projected ballet entitled The Great Elopement. It was the last of six suites of Handel's music arranged by Beecham from 1924 onwards.

It was first heard in a broadcast by the American Broadcasting Symphony Orchestra, conducted by Beecham, on 7 April 1945. The first concert performance followed five days later, by the Rochester Philharmonic under Beecham. He continued to include movements from the work in his programmes for the rest of his life, and it featured in his final concert, in May 1960, less than a year before he died.

The music has been recorded, but the projected ballet was never staged. The scenario, conceived and written by Beecham, is loosely based on real events. Set in 18th-century Bath, it depicts the love affair and elopement of the playwright Richard Brinsley Sheridan and Elizabeth Linley (daughter of the composer Thomas Linley), in the elite society of Bath, presided over by the dandy Beau Nash.

The music is mostly taken from Handel's operas, which in Beecham's day were rarely staged and were widely considered unstageable. Beecham researched the scores of many of them and for this ballet he exhumed forgotten numbers from operas including Ariodante, Il pastor fido, Parnasso in festa and Rodrigo, adding at the climax the only well-known number in the score, the "Largo" – "Ombra mai fu" – from Serse, transcribed for the full orchestra.

== Numbers ==
1. The Pump Room (after Parnasso in festa)
2. Beau Nash (after "Il dolce foco mio", Rodrigo)
3. The Linleys (after Parnasso in festa)
4. Hunting Dance
5. Love Scene (after Il pastor fido)
6. The Quarrel (after Il pastor fido)
7. The Pump Room (reprise)
8. The Plot
9. The Weary Flunkies
10. The Exquisites (after Parnasso in festa)
11. Second Love Scene (after Rodrigo)
12. March (from a Handel serenade for wind instruments)
13. Sarabande
14. Minuet (after Il pastor fido)
15. Hornpipe (after Il pastor fido)
16. Rondeau (after Ariodante) (Note: Beecham first borrowed this number from Ariodante for his score for a 1932 Handel-Beecham ballet score The Origin of Design.)
17. Gigue (after Rodrigo)
18. March (reprise)
19. Interlude
20. Serenade ("Sospiretto d'un labbro pallido" from Il pastor fido)
21. The Elopement (after Parnasso in festa)
22. Discovery—Finale (after Parnasso in festa and Serse)

Source: EMI.

== Plot and scenes ==
The movements of the ballet, and the action as described by Beecham in the score, are as follows:

1. The Pump Room.

"The scene is a large hall, one of the pump rooms in the baths, and various persons are taking the waters or walking about. In the centre of the background and covering nearly one half of it are tall, wide curtains screening what is afterwards disclosed to be an egress into the gardens behind. It is a bright morning in summer."

2. Beau Nash

"The Master of Ceremonies, Beau Nash, enters and salutes the water-drinkers. He announces a fête and concert for the evening at which the beautiful Miss Linley will sing. Beau Nash is a handsome, genial person, slightly pompous and in his early 40s."

3. The Linleys

"Enter Squire Squaretoes followed by Mr and Miss Linley. The squire is a bucolic and awkward type, obviously purse-proud and vain. Mr Linley is amiable, fussy and self-important. Miss Linley is about 18 and modest in appearance. It is clear that she does not welcome the attentions of the squire, although these are supported by her father."

4. Hunting Dance

"Sheridan enters in hunting costume: he and his four friends, who are equipped with hunting horns and riding whips, perform a lively dance."

5. Love Scene

"Sheridan observes Miss Linley and is presented to her by Beau Nash. He instantly becomes enamoured of her and she is equally attracted to him. The squire and Mr Linley have retired to the background, where they take the waters and converse with friends. Sheridan declares his love, but Miss Linley indicates the obstacles in the way."

6. The Quarrel

"The attention of the squire and Mr Linley is now drawn to the tender passages between the young couple and they display marked dissatisfaction. Miss Linley endeavours to conciliate her father, but without effect, and she is hurried by him from the hall, the squire following."

7. The Pump Room

"The water-drinkers leave the hall by the exits at the two sides of the scene (music same as No.1)."

8. The Plot

"Sheridan implores the advice and aid of Beau Nash, who at first refuses to have anything to do with the affair. Gradually he is won over to a plan whereby Sheridan can run off with Miss Linley, provided she consents. Beau Nash, Sheridan and his four friends leave together."

9. The Weary Flunkeys

"Three tall flunkeys enter the empty stage and draw aside the tall curtains in the background to expose to view a spacious garden flanked by an elegant building behind it. The flunkeys are world-weary creatures who move with the greatest deliberation, perform their task with extreme reluctance and yawn frequently."

10. The Exquisites (Madrigal)

"There enter from the garden eight persons clad in the most fashionable clothes of the period. These are the exquisites, who perform a slow and stately dance. There are four men and four women and they make their appearance in couples. Finally they go out."

11. Second Love Scene

"Enter Miss Linley and Sheridan, the former from the garden and the latter by one of the pump room entrances. Miss Linley is agitated and apprehensive. Sheridan does his best to reassure her, discloses his plan for their elopement and obtains her approval of it. They go off in opposite directions. By this time the light has changed so as to present the appearance of late afternoon."

12. March

"A procession of the whole company led by Beau Nash enters the stage from the garden."

13. Sarabande

"This is the first of a set of formal ballet movements."

14. Minuet

"A solo dance for Miss Linley."

15. Hornpipe

"The first measure is danced by a group of naval officers, the second by a midshipman, the third by the principal officer, the fourth by a group of girls, the fifth by girls and men." The number ends with a prominent quotation from "Rule, Britannia", which Beecham said he added to annoy the Americans. (Note: In requisitioning this number for his own purposes Beecham was following the composer's own practice: the theme is that of the aria "Ho un non sò che nel cor" for Mary Magdalene in Handel's early oratorio La resurrezione (1708), reused for the title character in Agrippina (1709), and for the shepherdess Eurilla in the revised version of Il pastor fido (1734).)

16. Rondeau

"A general ensemble."

17. Gigue

"A general ensemble."

18. March

"The whole company retires as it made its appearance (music same as No.12)."

19. Interlude

"The stage is empty. Light gradually fades, leaving the foreground in semi-darkness. Lights are seen in the windows of the building in the far background. The evening entertainment is beginning."

20. Serenade

"Miss Linley is heard singing her song. Beau Nash enters from the garden and is met by Sheridan and his four friends. The final arrangements for the elopement have been completed. A parson has been secured to marry them immediately. Beau Nash and his friends go off quietly. Sheridan remains to wait for Miss Linley."

21. The Elopement.

"Miss Linley runs in from the garden. Beau Nash urges them to hurry, and she disappears with Sheridan."

22. Discovery—Finale

"Her absence is discovered and the whole company enters the scene. The squire and Mr Linley are furious, but everyone else seems delighted. The uproar is silenced by the appearance of the parson, who informs the company that Miss Linley and Mr Sheridan are now man and wife. Evident satisfaction of everyone except the squire and Mr Linley, but the latter accepts the fait accompli. Miss Linley and Sheridan reappear, and receive the congratulations of the assembled company."

== Recordings and concert performances ==
Beecham conducted a recording of twelve excerpts from the suite, under the title The Great Elopement, with the London Philharmonic Orchestra in 1945. They comprise numbers I, II, III, IV, V, VIII, IX, XI, XIII, XV, XVII and XIX. The discs were issued by His Master's Voice in Britain and RCA Victor in the US. A CD transfer of the set was issued in 1996 by Dutton Vocalion coupled with music from other Beecham-Handel works, The Origin of Design, The Gods Go a'Begging, The Faithful Shepherd and Amaryllis.

In 1951 Beecham recorded excerpts from the score with the Royal Philharmonic Orchestra. Like the LPO set, it was issued under the title The Great Elopement, on mono, 78 r.p.m discs by His Master's Voice. In both the LPO and RPO sets of excerpts the Serenade is performed in a solely orchestral arrangement.

Beecham recorded the complete score with the RPO in stereo at sessions between November 1956 and November 1959 at Studio 1, EMI, Abbey Road, and Kingsway Hall, London. The set was issued under the title Love in Bath on LP in 1960 by His Master's Voice in Britain and Angel in the US the following year. The soprano soloist in the Serenade was Ilse Hollweg, one of the conductor's favourite singers. The recording has been reissued on EMI CD OCLC 612695135 (1990) and OCLC 871010231 (2005), and by Naxos and Beulah on CD and as a download. When the recording was first released, William Mann wrote in The Times:

Historical respectability is the last quality we look for in Sir Thomas Beecham's unflagging championship of Handel, though there, too, we find love and admiration. A recent fruit of it is Sir Thomas's ballet Love in Bath, exquisitely however anachronistically treated (parts of it sound like Grieg and Tchaikovsky and even Sullivan), and superbly played for His Master's Voice by the Royal Philharmonic Orchestra. The ballet, which is about the elopement of Sheridan with Miss Linley, has never yet been staged. It would be a good subject for, say, Mr John Cranko – and for the Bath Festival.

A concert in 1957 by Beecham and the RPO at the Palestra delle scuole in Ascona, which included an eighteen-minute selection from the suite was recorded, and was released on CD in 1994. In April 1960, at a concert in Toronto, Beecham conducted the CBC Symphony Orchestra in ten movements from the suite. They were given in a different order from the ballet score. (Note: XVIII. March; X. The Exquisites; VIII. The Plot; III. The Linleys; IV. Hunting Dance; XIV. Minuet; XI. Second Love Scene; XIX. Interlude; XVI. Rondeau; XV. Hornpipe.) A recording of the concert was released on CD in 2011 on the Music & Arts label.

After Beecham's death in 1961, John Pritchard included Love in Bath in a concert with the Royal Liverpool Philharmonic Orchestra at the Royal Festival Hall in November 1962, and in another with the LPO in June 1963. Since then the suite has dropped out of regular concert schedules. (Note: The work is not mentioned in the arts and entertainments listings in The Times after 1970.)

== Notes, references and sources ==
=== Sources ===
- Lucas, John (2008). Thomas Beecham: An Obsession with Music. Woodbridge: Boydell Press. ISBN 978-1-84383-402-1.
