= Le cheval de bronze =

Opera by Daniel Auber

Le Cheval de bronze: Poster for original production, 23 March 1835, Opéra-Comique, Salle de la Bourse, Paris

Le Cheval de bronze (The Bronze Horse) is an opéra comique by the French composer Daniel Auber, first performed on 23 March 1835 by the Opéra-Comique at the Salle de la Bourse in Paris. The libretto (in three acts) is by Auber's regular collaborator, Eugène Scribe and the piece was a great success in its day. In 1857, it was transformed into an opera-ballet, but this did not hold the stage. The overture is one of Auber's most popular. The first-act finale expands on the final phrases from the first-act finale of Mozart's Così fan tutte. The composer tried to reflect the Chinese setting of the story in the music.

== Performance history ==
The opera was first performed in England on 14 December 1835 at the Covent Garden Theatre in London, and in the United States on 15 April 1836 at the Théâtre d'Orléans in New Orleans.

In March 2012 a production was staged by the Komische Oper Berlin (German version by Bettina Bartz und Werner Hintze) and later broadcast by Deutschlandradio Kultur.

== Roles ==
Role	Voice type	Premiere Cast, 23 March 1835 (Conductor: Henri Valentino)
Prince Yang, imperial prince of China	tenor	Louis-Antoine-Eléonore Ponchard
Stella, Mughal princess	soprano	Alphonsine-Virginie-Marie Dubois ("Mme Casimir")
Tsing-Sing, a mandarin	tenor	Louis Féréol
Tchin-Kao, a wealthy farmer	baritone	Giovanni Inchindi
Tao-Jin	soprano	Marie-Sophie Callault-Ponchard
Péki, daughter of the farmer Tchin-Kao	soprano	Félicité Pradher
Yan-Ko, a young farmhand	tenor	Étienne-Bernard-Auguste Thénard
Lo-Mangli, Stella's maid-of-honor	soprano	Fargueil
Chorus: Stella's ladies; soldiers and lords of the prince; peasants

== Synopsis ==
Place: China
Time: “the age of the heroes”

Péki is due to be married against her will to the mandarin Tsing-Sing, who already has four wives. Péki meets Prince Yang and tells him she is really in love with the poor young farmhand Yan-Ko, but six months earlier he mysteriously disappeared into the sky riding a bronze horse. Yan-Ko returns on the horse but refuses to say where he has been. The prince interrupts Péki's wedding by ordering Tsing-Sing to fly away with him on the horse. Undeterred by the ruined wedding, Péki's father finds another rich old man for her to marry. She decides to elope with Yan-Ko. Tsing-Sing returns on the bronze horse without the prince and refuses to reveal anything about his adventure because if he does he will be transformed into a statue. Unfortunately, he mumbles some details during his sleep and is turned into stone, as is Péki's beloved, Yan-Ko. She decides to ride away on the horse to try to save him. The horse takes Péki (who is disguised as a man) to the palace of Princess Stella on the planet Venus. Péki needs Stella's magic bracelet to rescue her beloved from the spell. She easily passes the task Stella sets her to resist seduction by a group of beautiful women. Péki returns to earth to find the statues of Yan-Ko, Tsing-Sing and Prince Yang (who was unable to resist kissing Stella). She uses the bracelet to free Yan-Ko and the prince but she will not fully release Tsing-Sing until he promises to give up his marriage claims on her. This leaves her free to marry Yan-ko and Prince Yang marries Princess Stella.

== Ballet ==
In 1857 Lucien Petipa staged a ballet to the music of the second version of the opera Le cheval de bronze (on September 21, 1857, Académie royale de musique, Paris); in the main role is Amalia Ferraris; in a month, she has been replaced by a Russian dancer Zinaida Richard (she became the wife of Louis Mérante).

== Recordings ==
- Le cheval de bronze Grosses Wiener Rundfunkorchester, conducted by Kurt Richter (recorded 1953; reissued on CD by Walhall, 2008)
- Le cheval de bronze Chorus and New Philharmonic Radio Orchestra, conducted by Jean-Pierre Marty (recorded 1979; reissued on CD by Gala, 2002)
