= Pierre-Chéri Lafont =

French actor

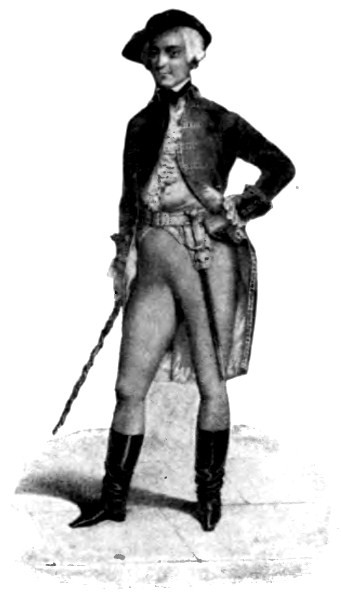
Pierre-Chéri Lafont as Le Chevalier de Saint Georges. Drawing by Alexandre Lacauchie, 1841.

Pierre-Chéri Lafont (16 May 1797 – 19 April 1873) was a French actor, born at Bordeaux.

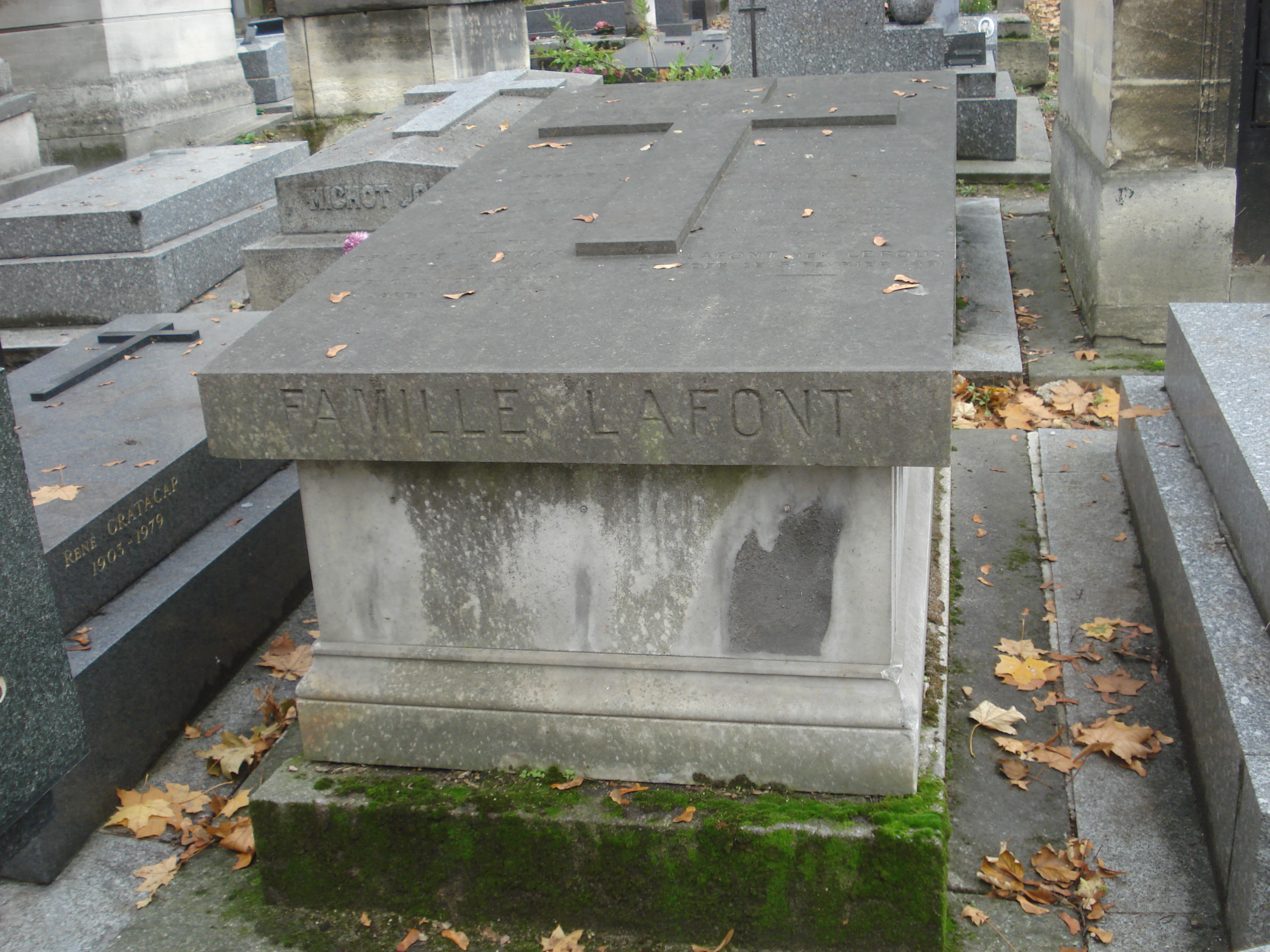
The tomb of Pierre-Chéri Lafont and Pauline Leroux in Montmartre Cemetery

Abandoning his profession as assistant ship's doctor in the navy, he went to Paris to study singing and acting. He had some experience at a small theater, and was preparing to appear at the Opéra Comique when the director of the Vaudeville offered him an engagement. Here he made his debut in 1821 in La Somnambule, (Note: La Somnambule (The Sleepwalker), a comedy-vaudeville in two acts by Eugène Scribe and Germain Delavigne, first produced at the Théâtre du Vaudeville on 6 December 1819.) and his good looks and excellent voice soon brought him into public favor. After several years at the Nouveautés and the Vaudeville, on the burning of the latter in 1838 he went to England, and married, at Gretna Green, Jenny Colon, from whom he was soon divorced. On his return to Paris, he joined the Variétés, where he acted for fifteen years in such plays as Le Chevalier de Saint-Georges, Le Lion empaillé, Une dernière conquête, etc.

Another engagement at the Vaudeville followed, and one at the Gaîté, and he ended his "brilliant career" at the Gymnase in the part of the noble father in such plays as Les Vieux Garçons and Nos bons villageois. On 12 July 1848 he married the dancer Pauline Leroux.

He died in Paris on 19 April 1873 and is buried in Montmartre Cemetery with Pauline Leroux.
