= The Code of Terpsichore =

1830 work by Carlo Blasis

In 1830, Italian ballet teacher and writer Carlo Blasis (1803–1878) published his second work on the analysis of ballet technique, called The Code of Terpsichore. This work was composed of figures, or illustrations, organized alphabetically, inscribing the ideal forms of poses, steps, and jumps in ballet. In codifying the tradition of ballet training, Blasis valued both the mechanical and aesthetic aspects of ballet.

The geometry of poses and positions were essential to his idea of precision. He also examined the kinetic ideal of static poses in order to master equilibrium. According to his kinetic studies, each movement has a center of gravity and a relation to perpendicular lines in the body. One of the most important concepts to Blasis was how the body must counteract forces to find and maintain balance. The Code of Terpsichore is well known for its figures of the attitude position. Blasis is said to have originally created the position as he was inspired by Giovanni da Bologna's sculpture, "Mercury". A figure of the sculpture is included alongside figures of ballet dancers in attitude. Blasis' pupils were expected to copy, memorize, and embody the figures in The Code of Terpsichore.

While The Code of Terpsichore was generally seen as the proper approach to ballet, Michel Fokine contested the strict use ballet's form and mechanics. He believed that Blasis' technique of forms and mechanics should only be used when serving a purpose so that ballet would not become trick oriented. Fokine advocated for more natural forms of dance with mechanical additions when appropriate.

The Code of Terpsichore and Blasis' traditions were passed on from generation to generation of dancers, including Giovanni Lepri to Enrico Cecchetti. The form of classic dance training used today is heavily influenced by Blasis
