= Carlo Blasis =

Italian ballet dancer and dance theoretician

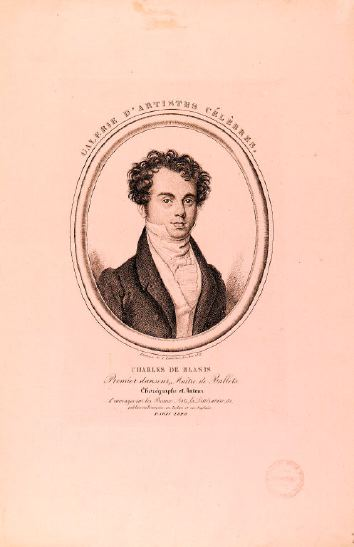
- Born: 1797
- Died: 1878 (aged 80–81)

Carlo Blasis (Italian pronunciation: [ˈkarlo ˈblaːzis]; 4 November 1797 – 15 January 1878) was an Italian dancer, choreographer and dance theoretician born in Naples. He is well known for his very rigorous dance classes, sometimes lasting four hours long. He danced in France, Italy, London and Russia. Blasis insisted that his students learn theories and definitions of dance steps. He trained all of Enrico Cecchetti's teachers and it is thought that Blasis's influence in his training is what led Cecchetti to create the Cecchetti method of ballet.

== Work ==
He published an analysis of the ballet techniques in 1820, in a work named Traité élémentaire, théorique, et pratique de l'art de la danse ("Elementary, Theoretical, and Practical Treatise on the Art of the Dance"). He is most known for the pose "Attitude" derived from the famous statue Mercury by Giovanni da Bologna. Enrico Cecchetti expanded his method of instruction and theories.

Even during his own time, Blasis was not best known for his many choreographies (none of which survive today), but for his writings on dance theory. He pioneered the reconciliation of balletic notions like lightness and grace with the geometry and physics of the body in motion. In The Code of Terpsichore, published in 1828, Blasis cataloged a clearly defined "alphabet" of dance poses. This may be the first attempt at a comprehensive systemization of dance.

Blasis radicalized dance theory by relying heavily upon mathematical geometry and physics. He introduced the idea of a "movement axis" – a vertical line through the pose, perpendicular to the floor, that delineates the center of balance of the body.

Blasis also contributed to dance pedagogy. He suggested that instructors first describe the bodily figures outlined in his index of poses, then have students memorize them before attempting to physically embody them. "The most diligent [student] might take copies of those figure on small slates, and carry them with them to study at home, in the same manner as a child, when he begins to spell, studies his horn-book."

Through the poses codified in his alphabet, Blasis felt that dancers could achieve the qualities of movement so desired in ballet like ease of motion and elegance. In his Notes Upon Dancing, Historical and Practical, Blasis praises certain ballets for their richness of emotion. When speaking of "The Neapolitan Tarantella," for example, he raves about how "love and pleasure are conspicuous throughout every movement," and "every gesture and motion are full of seductive grace." Thus, Blasis ultimately wished for dancers to layer emotional expression on top of the codified, regimented poses demanded by the choreography and outlined in The Code of Terpsichore.

Through these practices, Blasis aimed to direct "the newborn Romantic ballet along classical lines." In this way, Blasis was ahead of his time. He took particular interest in some movements considered to be too aggressively virtuosic for the Romantic era of the early 1800s. For example, he initiated the codification of the pirouette, breaking it down into a preparation, turn, and finish. It was not until the era of Marius Petipa in the late 1800s, just following the age of romanticism, that physically intense steps like the pirouette became widespread in ballet choreography, yet Blasis was analyzing them decades before. Although the previous statement has been repeated for decades, more modern research has revealed that the 'grotesque' or old italian form of dancing of the 18th century, had a rich variety of pirouettes available for use in choreography.

From 1838 to 1853, Blasis and his wife, Annunciata Ramaccioni, were the artistic directors of what is now the La Scala Theatre Ballet School. Prima ballerinas Fanny Cerrito, Carolina Rosati, Sofia Fuoco, Amalia Ferraris and Carlotta Brianza were among their students. Blasis referred to seven of his dancers, who he was particularly proud of, as his "Pleiades": Marietta Baderna, Augusta Dominichettis, Amalia Ferraris, Sofia Fuoco, Flora Fabbri, Carolina Granzini and Pasquale Borri.

== Death ==
Blasis died in Cernobbio.

== See also ==
- List of dancers
