= Le Diable amoureux (ballet) =

1840 ballet

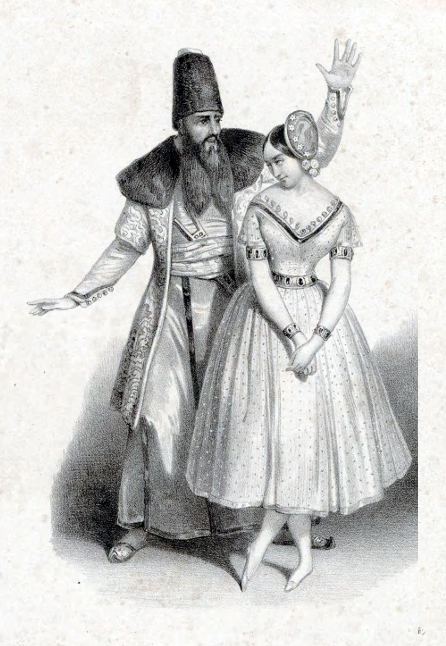
Pauline Leroux in Act III of Le Diable Amoureux

Le Diable amoureux (also known as Satanella or Love and Hell) is a ballet-pantomime in three acts and eight scenes, originally choreographed by Joseph Mazilier to the music of Napoléon Henri Reber and François Benoist. The libretto by Jules-Henri Vernoy de Saint-Georges is based on Jacques Cazotte's 1772 occult romance The Devil in Love. The work was first presented by the Ballet of the Royal Academy of Music (Paris Opera Ballet) in Paris on 23 September 1840, with Pauline Leroux (as Uriel), Mazilier (as Alvaro, for ballet his name is Frederic), and Louise Fitz-James (as Lilia).

== Revivals ==
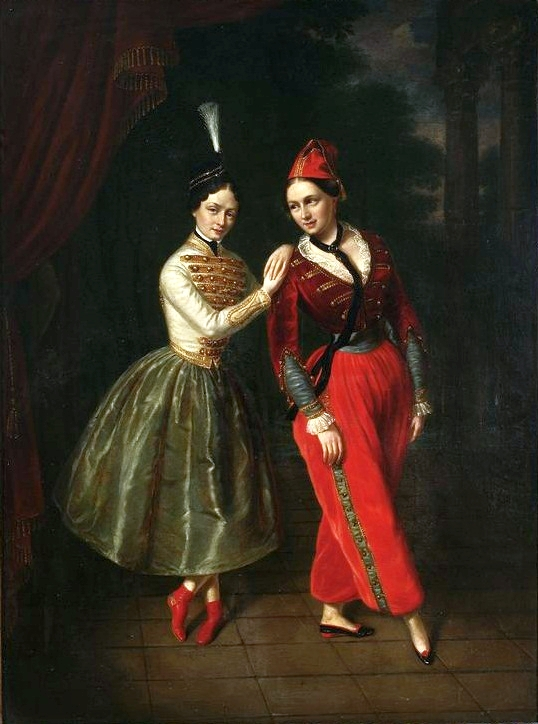
The Strauss sisters, Leila and Asmodée, 1853, by Jan Ksawery Kaniewski

- Revival by Marius Petipa and Jean-Antoine Petipa for Russia's Imperial Ballet under the title Satanella, with music orchestrated and revised by Konstantin Liadov. First presented on 22 February [O.S. 10 February] 1848 at the Imperial Bolshoi Kamenny Theatre, Saint Petersburg. Principal dancers: Yelena Andreyanova as Satanella, and Marius Petipa as Count Fabio.
- Revival by Petipa for the Imperial Ballet with additional music by Cesare Pugni. First presented on 30 October [O.S. 18 October] 1866 at the Imperial Bolshoi Kamenny Theatre. Principal dancers:Praskovia Lebedeva as Satanella, and Lev Ivanov as Count Fabio.
- Revival by Petipa for the Imperial Ballet with additional music by Cesare Pugni. First presented on 7 May [O.S. 25 April] 1868 at the Imperial Bolshoi Kamenny Theatre. Principal dancers: Alexandra Vergina as Satanella, and Lev Ivanov as Count Fabio.
- Revival of Petipa by Ivan Chliustin and Nicola Domashov for the Imperial Ballet. First presented on 18 February [O.S. 6 February] 1897 at the Bolshoi Theatre in Moscow. Principal dancers: Lyubov Roslavleva.

== Gallery ==
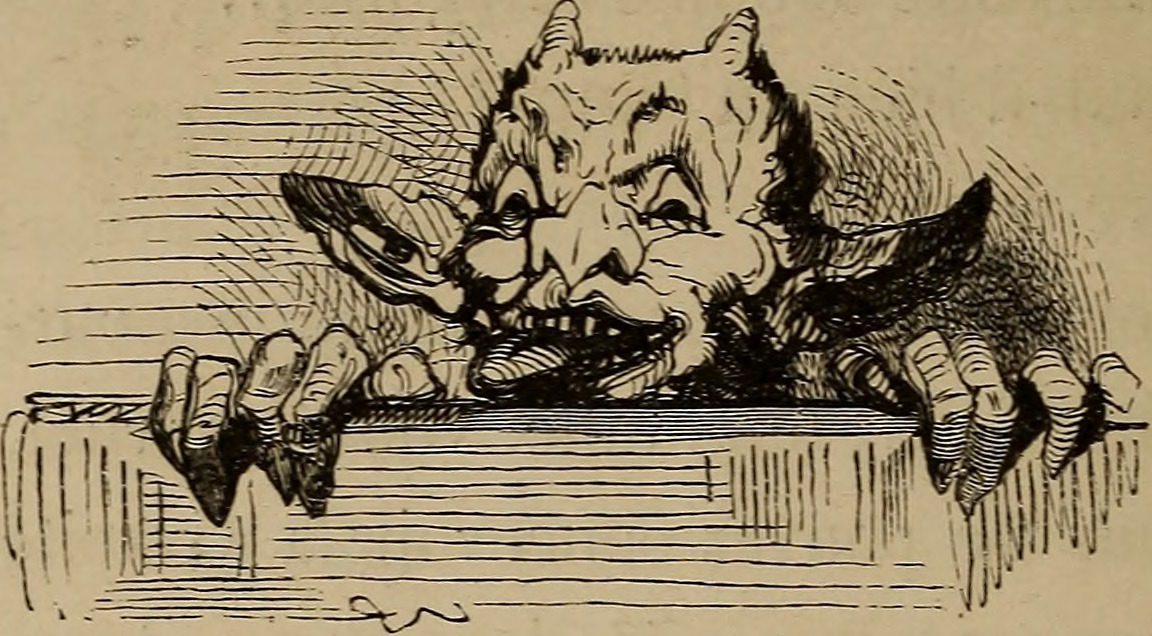
Image from "Le diable amoureux, roman fantastique" (1845)
