= Joseph Mazilier =

French dancer, balletmaster and choreographer

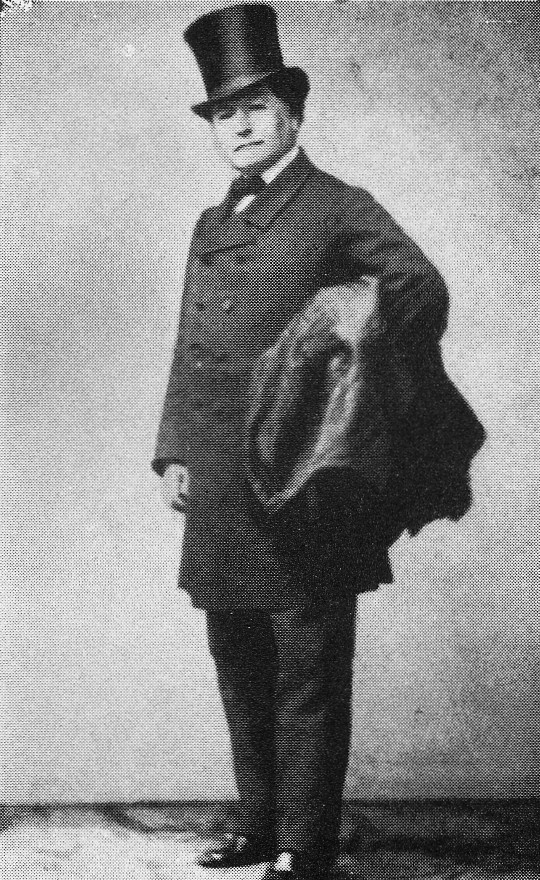
- Joseph Mazilier in c. 1860
- Born: Giulio Mazarini; 1 March 1801; Marseille
- Died: 19 May 1868 (aged 67); Paris
- Occupations: Dancer, balletmaster and choreographer
- Career
- Dances: Le Diable amoureux (1840); Paquita (1846); Le Corsaire (1856)

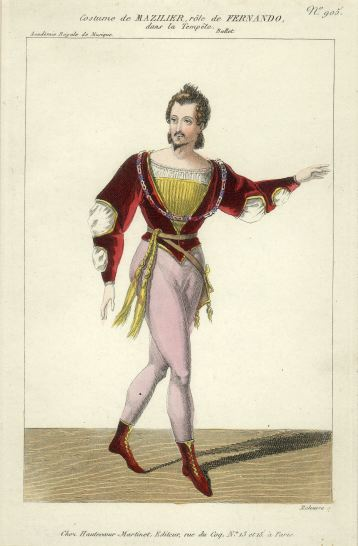
Mazilier in La Tempête (1835), engraved by Maleuvre

Joseph Mazilier (1 March 1801 – 19 May 1868) was a 19th-century French dancer, balletmaster and choreographer. He was born as Giulio Mazarini. He was most noted for his ballets Paquita (1844) and Le Corsaire (1856). He created the role of James in La Sylphide with Marie Taglioni. Marie Guy-Stéphan debuted in Aelia et Mysis at the Paris Opéra when she moved in 1853 to Paris.

== Ballets ==
- La Gypsy (1839)
- La Vendetta (1839)
- Le Diable Amoureux (1840)
- Lady Henrietta, or the Servant of Greenwich (Lady Henriette, ou la Servante de Greenwich) (1944)
- Le Diable à Quatre (1845)
- Paquita (1846)
- Betty (1846)
- Griseldis, ou les Cinq sens (1848)
- Vert-vert (Green-Green) (1851)
- Orfa (1852)
- Aelia et Mysis, ou l'Atellane (1853)
- Jovita, ou les Boucaniers (1853)
- La Fonti (1855)
- Le Corsaire (1856)
- Les Elfes (1856)
- Marco Spada ou La Fille du Bandit (1857)
- Une fête au port (1867)

== Roles ==
- James in La Sylphide by Filippo Taglioni in 1832
- Fernando in La Tempête by Jean Coralli in 1834
- Stenio in La Gypsy in 1839

== Other ballet posts ==
- Master of the Paris Opera Ballet from 1839 until 1851.
- Master of the Saint Petersburg Ballet from 1851 until 1852
- Master of the Paris Opera Ballet from 1852 until 1857.
- Master of the Lyon Ballet from 1862 until 1866
- Master of ballet at the Théâtre royal de la Monnaie in Brussels from 1866 until 1867

Political offices
Preceded by Arthur Saint-Léon	Director of the Paris Opera Ballet; 1853–1859	Succeeded by Lucien Petipa
Preceded by Vincent	Director of the Théâtre de la Monnaie; 1866–1867	Succeeded by Alfred Lamy
