= Viktoria Tereshkina =

Russian ballet dancer

- Born: May 31, 1983 (age 43); Krasnoyarsk, USSR
- Occupation: ballet dancer
- Dancing career
- Current group: Mariinsky Ballet

Viktoria Valerievna Tereshkina (Russian: Викто́рия Вале́рьевна Терёшкина; born 31 May 1983) is a Russian ballet dancer, who performs as a principal dancer with the Mariinsky Ballet in Saint Petersburg. People's Artist of Russia (2018). Laureate of the highest theater award of St. Petersburg "Golden Soffit" (2005, 2006), and Laureate of the IX International Ballet Competition "Arabesque" (Perm, 2006).

== Early life ==
Tereshkina was born in Krasnoyarsk in Siberia where her father was a gymnastics teacher. From the age of four she was trained in artistic gymnastics in which she performed increasingly well. However, when she reached the age of 10, her parents decided her prospects for an extended career would be better in ballet. As a result, she was sent to the ballet school in Krasnoyarsk. When she was 16, she took part in a ballet festival in Saint Petersburg. She was noticed by Igor Belsky who recommended she should join the Vaganova Academy of Russian Ballet where he was artistic director. After training for five years in Krasnoyarsk, she therefore spent a further three years in Saint Petersburg in the class of Marina Vassilieva.

Tereshkina has one daughter named Milada born in 2013.

Tereshkina was married to Artem Shpilevsky (former soloist with the Bolshoi Ballet). She is now married to Roman Belyakov, a soloist with the Mariinsky Ballet.

== Career ==
Following her graduation in 2001, Tereshkina immediately joined the Mariinsky Ballet where she became a soloist in 2005 and a principal in 2008. She debuted as Odette/Odile in Swan Lake in 2002; it was her first principal role.

Tereshkina has performed in Mariinsky's extensive repertoire of classical and modern ballet. Particularly notable are her Gamzatti and Nikya in La Bayadère, Kitri in Don Quixote, Odette/Odile in Swan Lake, Queen Mekhemene Banu in A Legend of Love, and Terpsichore in Apollo. Writing in The Daily Telegraph, Sarah Crompton referred to her as a "rising talent", describing her as a "filigree beauty" with "fiendish fouettés".

She created the role of Parasha in Yuri Smekalov's production of The Bronze Horseman (2016), Paquita in Smekalov's revival of the ballet of the same name (2017), and The Mistress of Copper Mountain in the Mariinsky revival of Yury Grigorovich's The Stone Flower in 2016.

In 2010, Tereshkina danced Aurora in Konstantin Sergeyev's version of the Sleeping Beauty when it was presented at the Kennedy Center in Washington D.C. She has toured with the Mariinsky to the United States (California, Washington D.C., and New York City) and throughout Europe and Asia.

In 2014, Tereshkina danced Nikiya in American Ballet Theatre's production of La Bayadère.

=== Repertoire ===
Viktoria has danced ballets choreographed by Marius Petipa, Yury Grigorovich, Alexei Ratmansky, Michel Fokine, George Balanchine, etc.

Marius Petipa

- Giselle (Giselle, Myrtha, Zulma)
- The Sleeping Beauty (Aurora, Gold Fairy, Diamond Fairy)
- Swan Lake (Odette-Odile, Big Swans)
- La Bayadère (Nikiya, Gamzatti)
- Raymonda (Raymonda)
- Le Corsaire (Medora)
- Don Quixote (Kitri)
- Paquita Grand Pas

Yuri Grigorovich

- A Legend of Love (Queen Mekhemene Banu)
- The Stone Flower (Mistress of Copper Mountain)

Michel Fokine

- Scheherazade (Zobeide)
- The Firebird (Fire Bird)

Alexei Ratmansky

- Concerto DSCH
- The Little Humpbacked Horse (Tsar Maiden)
- Cinderella (Khudishka, Female Dance)
- Anna Karenina (Anna Karenina)

George Balanchine

- Jewels (Rubies, Diamonds)
- Apollo (Polyhymnia, Calliope, Terpischore)
- A Midsummer Night's Dream (Titania)
- Symphony in C (I. Allegro Vivo)
- Swan Lake
- Serenade
- Theme and Variations
- The Four Temperaments
- Piano Concerto No 2/Ballet Imperial
- Tarantella

Frederick Ashton

- Sylvia (Sylvia)
- Marguerite and Armand (Marguerite)

William Forsythe

- In the Middle, Somewhat Elevated
- Approximate Sonata

Yuri Smekalov

- Paquita (Paquita); production by Yuri Smekalov
- The Bronze Horseman (Parasha); choreography by Yuri Smekalov
- Bolero Factory (The Soul)

Hans van Manen

- 5 Tangos
- Adagio Hammerklavier

Other choreographers

- The Fountain of Bakhchisarai (Zarema); choreography by Rostislav Zakharov
- The Young Lady and the Hooligan (The Young Lady); choreography by Konstantin Boyarsky
- Romeo and Juliet (Juliet); choreography by Leonid Lavrovsky
- Spartacus (Phrygia); choreography by Leonid Yakobson
- Grand Pas Classique; choreography by Viktor Gzovsky
- In the Night; choreography by Jerome Robbins
- Le Jeune Homme et la Mort (The Girl); choreography by Roland Petit
- Manon (Manon); choreography by Kenneth MacMillan
- Carmen-Suite (Carmen); choreography by Alberto Alonso
- Etudes (Soloist); choreography by Harald Lander
- Ondine (Queen of the Sea); choreography by Pierre Lacotte
- Dolce, con fuoco; choreography by Svetlana Anufrieva
- The Ring; choreography by Alexei Miroshnichenko
- Aria Suspended (soloist); choreography by Peter Quanz
- Diana and Actaeon Pas de Deux; choreography by Agrippina Vaganova
- The Nutcracker (Masha); choreography by Vasili Vainonen
- The Cat on the Tree and Violin Concerto No. 2; choreography by Anton Pimonov
- Pulcinella (Pimpinella); choreography by Ilya Zhivoi
- The Village Don Juan; choreography by Leonid Yakobson
- Tango-Fugato; choreography by Alexei Miroshnichenko
- Adulte; choreography by Ilya Zhivoi
- Elegy. Ophelia; choreography by Ksenia Zvereva

== Awards ==
The awards received by Viktoria Tereshkina include:

- 2005: Golden Sofit: Best Female Role in Ballet (Approximate Sonata)
- 2006: Golden Sofit: Best Female Role in Ballet (Queen of the Sea in Ondine)
- 2006: Rising Star award from Ballet magazine
- 2008: Honoured Artist of Russia
- 2010: Ms Virtuosa award at the International Ballet Festival
- 2014: Golden Sofit: Best Female Role in Ballet (Sylvia)
- 2017: Golden Mask for "Best Female Role in Ballet (Violin Concerto No. 2, choreography by Anton Pimonov)
- 2018: People's Artist of Russia
