= Maria Shirinkina =

Russian ballerina

Maria Shirinkina (Maria Shklyarova)
- Мария Ширинкина
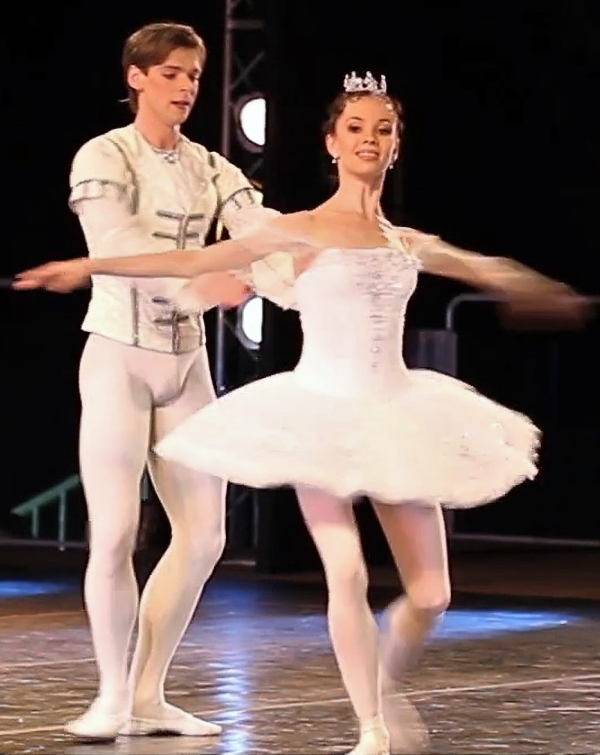
- Shirinkina (right) with Vladimir Shklyarov at the Ravello Festival in The Sleeping Beauty, 2013
- Born: April 18, 1987 (age 38); Perm, Russia, Soviet Union
- Education: Perm Ballet School
- Occupation: Ballerina
- Spouse: Vladimir Shklyarov (m. 2013; died 2024)
- Children: 2
- Career
- Current group: Mariinsky Ballet, Bayerisches Staatsballett
- Dances: Giselle, The Sleeping Beauty, Romeo and Juliet

Maria Shirinkina (Russian: Мария Ширинкина, born 18 April 1987) is a Russian ballerina, who is a first soloist of the Mariinsky Ballet and a guest principal dancer of the Bayerisches Staatsballett.

== Biography ==
Maria Shirinkina was born in Perm and studied at the Perm Ballet School under Ninel Silvanovich. She graduated in 2006 and, upon her graduation, she joined the Mariinsky Ballet. She was promoted to second soloist in 2011 following her début as Juliet in Leonid Lavrovsky's Romeo and Juliet. She has toured across the world with the Mariinsky Ballet to places such as the United States, Europe, China and Japan.

Her repertoire includes the Sylph in La Sylphide, Giselle, Princess Aurora in The Sleeping Beauty, Cinderella, Raymonda and leading roles in Chopiniana, Jewels, Symphony in C and the Tschaikovsky Pas de Deux. In June 2016, she made her début as Nikiya in a gala performance of the "Kingdom of the Shades" scene from La Bayadère held at the Ural Opera in Yekaterinburg.

In September 2016, Shirinkina and her husband took a one-year sabbatical and joined the Bayerische Staatsballett in Munich, Germany as principals with the invitation of Igor Zelensky, the theater's new artistic director. They returned to Saint Petersburg in 2017, but continue to perform as guest principals in Munich. During her season in Munich, Shirinkina made her débuts as Phrygia in Yuri Grigorovich's Spartacus, Lise in Frederick Ashton's La fille mal gardée and Alice in Christopher Wheeldon's Alice's Adventures in Wonderland, as well as her full-length début as Nikiya in Patrice Bart's production of La Bayadère and Juliet in Cranko's Romeo and Juliet.

In 2019, Shirinkina was promoted to First Soloist with the Mariinsky Ballet.

== Personal life ==
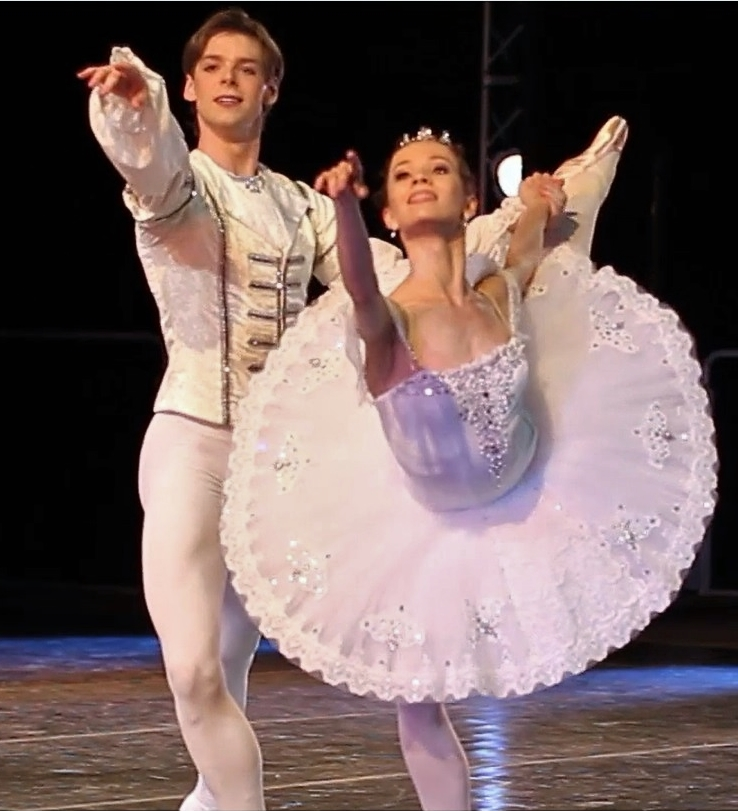
Shirinkina (right) with Vladimir Shklyarov at the Ravello Festival in The Sleeping Beauty, 2013

Shirinkina was married to Vladimir Shklyarov, a principal at the Mariinsky Ballet. They have had two children, a son, Alexey, in February 2015, and a daughter, Alexandra, July 2021. Shklyarov died in November 2024.

== Repertoire ==
- Giselle in Giselle
- The Sylph in La Sylphide
- Princess Aurora in The Sleeping Beauty
- Princess Masha in Vainonen's The Nutcracker
- Nikiya in La Bayadère
- Raymonda in Raymonda
- Gulnare in Le Corsaire
- Mazurka and Pas de deux in Chopiniana
- The Young Girl in Le Spectre de la rose
- Juliet in Lavrovsky's and Cranko's Romeo and Juliet
- Syuimbike in Leonid Yakobson's Shurale
- Maria in Zakharov's The Fountain of Bakhchisarai
- The Tsar Maiden in Alexei Ratmansky's The Little Humpbacked Horse
- Cinderella in Alexei Ratmansky's Cinderella
- Phrygia in Yuri Grigorovich's Spartacus
- Princess Shyrin in Yuri Grigorovich's The Legend of Love
- Parasha in Yuri Smekalov's The Bronze Horseman
- Lucille Grahn in Anton Dolin's Pas de Quatre
- Lise in Frederick Ashton's La fille mal gardée
- Alice in Christopher Wheeldon's Alice's Adventures in Wonderland
- Emeralds and Rubies in Jewels
- Divertissement Pas de deux in George Balanchine's A Midsummer Night's Dream
- First Movement in Symphony in C
- Tschaikovsky Pas de Deux
- Helena in John Neumeier's A Midsummer Night's Dream
- Columbine in Carnaval
