= Vladimir Shklyarov =

Russian ballet dancer (1985–2024)

- Владимир Шкляров
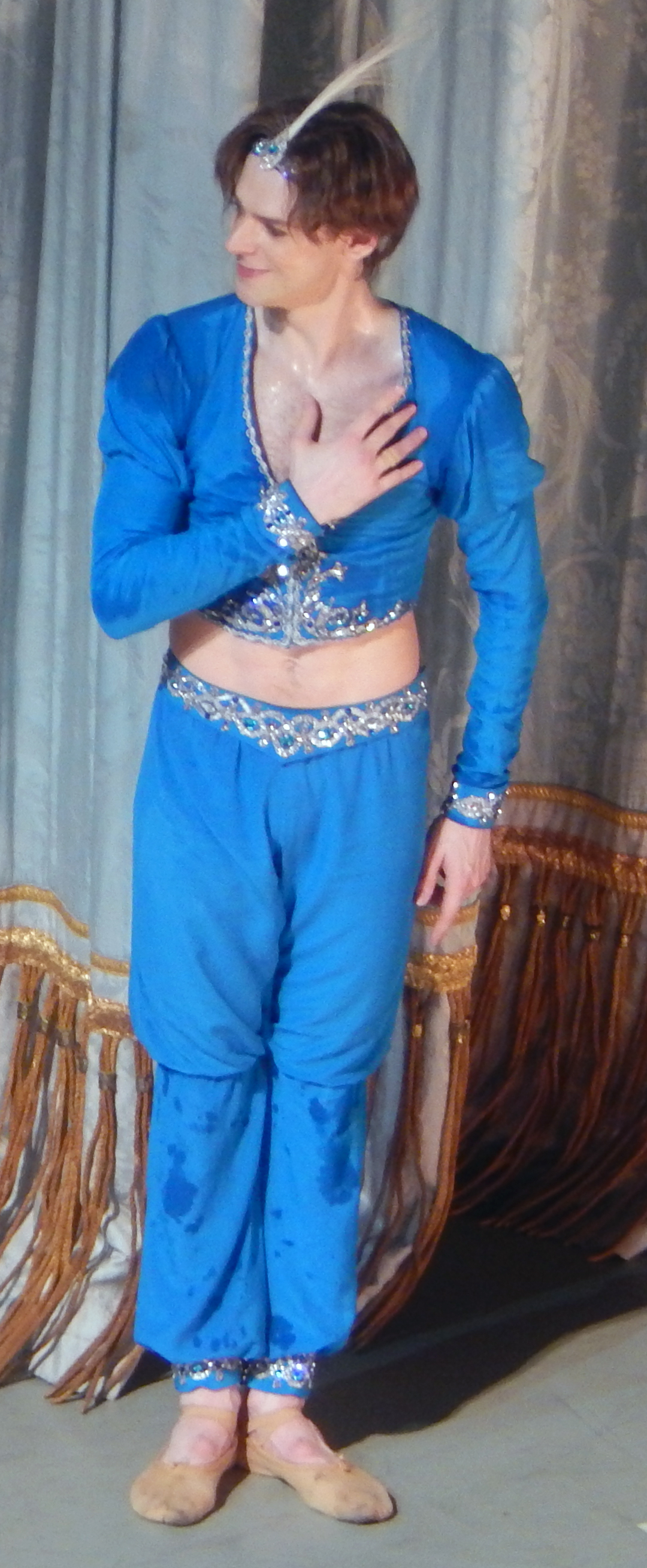
- Shklyarov in 2017
- Born: Vladimir Andreyevich Shklyarov; 9 February 1985; Leningrad, Russian SFSR, Soviet Union
- Died: 16 November 2024 (aged 39); Saint Petersburg, Russia
- Education: Vaganova Academy
- Occupation: Ballet dancer
- Spouse: Maria Shirinkina (m. 2013)
- Children: 2
- Career
- Former groups: Mariinsky Ballet; Bavarian State Ballet (guest); The Royal Ballet (guest)
- Dances: Swan Lake; La Bayadère; Giselle; Don Quixote; The Sleeping Beauty

Vladimir Andreyevich Shklyarov (Russian: Владимир Андреевич Шкляров; 9 February 1985 – 16 November 2024) was a Russian ballet dancer, who ranked as a principal dancer at the Mariinsky Ballet in Saint Petersburg. He had also been a guest principal with the Bavarian State Ballet in Munich, Germany, and The Royal Ballet in London. He died after falling from the 5th floor of an apartment building in Saint Petersburg.

== Early life and career ==
Vladimir Shklyarov was born in Leningrad, now Saint Petersburg, on 9 February 1985. He was trained at the Vaganova Academy of Russian Ballet, the associate school of the Mariinsky Ballet, and graduated in 2003, from the class of Vitaly Afanaskov.

He joined the Mariinsky Ballet the same year. He was promoted to principal in 2011.

His repertoire included James in La Sylphide, Duke Albrecht in Giselle, Solor in La Bayadère, Prince Désiré in The Sleeping Beauty, Prince Siegfried in Swan Lake, the Prince in The Nutcracker, Jean de Brienne in Raymonda, Basilio in Don Quixote and Ivan the Fool in The Little Humpbacked Horse. He also danced the lead roles in the Paquita Grand Pas Classique, Le Spectre de la Rose, Chopiniana, and Jewels.

In 2007, he danced the lead role of Zéphyr in the première of Sergei Vikharev's reconstruction of Marius Petipa's one act ballet, The Awakening of Flora. He also danced the lead role of Harlequin in the première of Vikharev's reconstruction of Michel Fokine's ballet, La Carnaval.

He was a guest dancer at American Ballet Theater in 2014 and 2015.

In early 2016, Shklyarov joined the Mariinsky on a U.S. tour. In September 2016, Shklyarov and his wife took a one-year sabbatical from the Mariinsky and joined the Bavarian State Ballet in Munich, Germany as guest principals at the invitation of Igor Zelensky, the theater's new artistic director. They returned to Saint Petersburg in 2017, but continued to dance as guests in Munich.

In 2017, Shklyarov joined The Royal Ballet in London as a guest principal after he filled in for Sergei Polunin, who withdrew at the last minute, in Frederick Ashton's Marguerite and Armand.

== Personal life and death ==
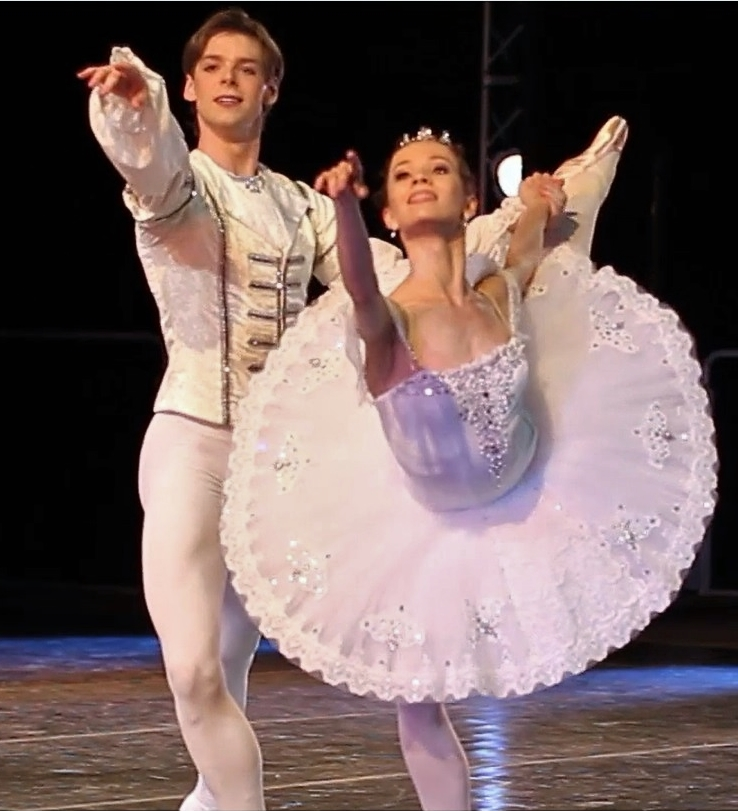
Shklyarov and Maria Shirinkina at the Ravello Festival in The Sleeping Beauty, 2013

Shklyarov married Maria Shirinkina, a first soloist at the Mariinsky, in 2013. They had two children.

In March 2022, after the Russian invasion of Ukraine, Shklyarov posted on social media in support of peace, "I am against any warfare!… I want neither wars nor borders" and “Politicians should be able to negotiate without shooting and killing civilians, for this they were given a tongue and a head". He later deleted the post, and did not comment further on the invasion on social media.

Shklyarov died on 16 November 2024, at the age of 39. His death was confirmed by the Mariinsky. Local media reported that he died after falling from the balcony of his fifth floor apartment in St Petersburg; he had been taking pain medication before a scheduled surgery. According to fellow dancer Irina Baranovskaya, he had gone out on the balcony to smoke and "lost his balance". According to RIA Novosti, an investigation has been launched into Shklyarov's death, although they ruled his fall an accident.

== Repertoire ==
- Count Albrecht in Giselle
- James in La Sylphide
- Prince Désiré in The Sleeping Beauty
- Prince Siegfried in Swan Lake
- The Prince in Vainonen's The Nutcracker
- Zephyr in The Awakening of Flora
- Solor in La Bayadère
- Jean de Brienne in Raymonda
- Basilio in Don Quixote
- Ali in Le Corsaire
- Petrushka in Petrushka
- The Ghost of the Rose in Le Spectre de la rose
- Matteo in Pierre Lacotte's Ondine
- Romeo in Lavrovsky's and Cranko's Romeo and Juliet
- Ali-Batyr in Leonid Yakobson's Shurale
- Ivanushka in Alexei Ratmansky's The Little Humpbacked Horse
- The Prince in Alexei Ratmansky's Cinderella
- Spartacus in Yuri Grigorovich's Spartacus
- Ferkhad in Yuri Grigorovich's The Legend of Love
- The Hooligan in The Young Lady and the Hooligan
- Colas in Frederick Ashton's La fille mal gardée
- Aminta in Frederick Ashton's Sylvia
- Armand in Frederick Ashton's Marguerite and Armand
- Jack/Knave of Hearts in Christopher Wheeldon's Alice's Adventures in Wonderland
- Rubies and Diamonds in Jewels
- Third Movement in Symphony in C
- Tschaikovsky Pas de Deux
- Des Grieux in Kenneth MacMillan's Manon

== Awards and honours ==
- Vaganova Prix (2002)
- Prize-winner at the XI International Ballet and Choreography Competition, in the category "Solo" (Moscow, 2009, 1st prize)
- Prize-winner at the Vaganova-Prix International Competition (St. Petersburg, 2002)
- Holder of the Soul of Dance – 2008 prize, instituted by Ballet magazine, in the category "Rising Star"
- Léonide Massine International Prize For the Art of Dance (Positano, Italy, 2008)
- Holder of the Zegna – Mariinsky New Talent Awards grant (London, 2008)
- Holder of the DANCE OPEN international ballet prize in the category "Mr Virtuoso" (2014)
- Holder of the BALLET2000 Prize, instituted by BALLET2000 magazine (2016)
- Honored Artist of Russia (2020)

== See also ==
- Suspicious Russia-related deaths since 2022
