= Ashley Bouder =

American ballet dancer

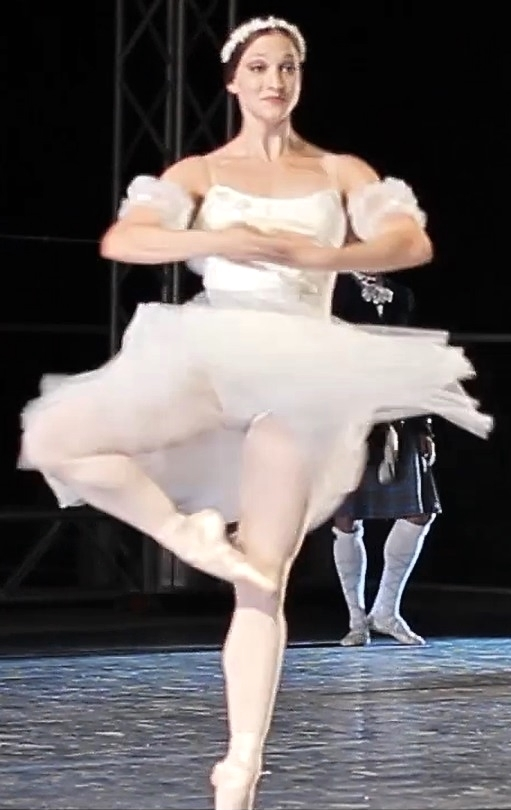
- Bouder at the Ravello Festival in the Bournonville version of La Sylphide, as the Sylph, 2013
- Born: December 10, 1983 (age 41); Carlisle, Pennsylvania
- Education: School of American Ballet
- Occupation: Ballet dancer
- Years active: 2000–present
- Spouse: Peter de Florio
- Children: Violet Storm de Florio
- Career
- Current group: New York City Ballet

Ashley Bouder (/ˈbaʊdər/; born December 10, 1983) is an American ballet dancer; formerly a principal dancer with the New York City Ballet. She also founded and currently runs her own project, The Ashley Bouder Project.

== Early life ==
Ashley Bouder was born in Carlisle, Pennsylvania. She started ballet when she was six, at the Central Pennsylvania Youth Ballet. In 1999, she attended the School of American Ballet, and was invited to stay and train at the winter session.

== Career ==
=== New York City Ballet ===
Bouder joined the New York City Ballet as an apprentice in June 2000, and was promoted to the corps de ballet four months later. She was named a soloist in 2004 and a principal dancer the following year. She has danced Balanchine works such as The Nutcracker and Serenade, and new works such as Alexei Ratmansky's Concerto DSCH and Justin Peck's Pulcinella Variations. In 2019, she won the Prix Benois de la Danse for dancing the role of Swanilda in Coppélia.

On 22 January 2025, 20 years after her promotion to principal dancer, Bouder announced her retirement from New York City Ballet. She gave her farewell performance in February, dancing the titular role of Firebird by George Balanchine. It had been her debut principal role, having first performed it in 2001 whilst still a member of the corps.

=== The Ashley Bouder Project ===
Bouder helms her own small company, The Ashley Bouder Project, that has mounted several innovative ballet productions in New York over the years, primarily centered on commissioning new works by women choreographers and composers, including her own. Dancers involved with the project include Bouder's NYCB colleagues, such as Sara Mearns, Taylor Stanley and Andrew Veyette. Notable appearances have been at the Joyce Theater in 2015. and at The Symphony Space in 2017, in collaboration with The New York Jazzharmonic. This was the first time that an entire evening of ballet in varied styles was set solely to the accompaniment of a jazz orchestra.

=== Other ventures ===
Bouder has called upon ballet to embrace Feminism.

She is a resident fellow at the Center for Ballet and the Arts at New York University.

== Awards ==
- Mae L. Wien Award for Outstanding Promise, 2000
- Janice Levin Dancer Honoree, 2002–2003
- Prix Benois de la Danse, 2019

== Personal life ==
She is married to financier Peter de Florio and gave birth to their daughter, Violet Storm de Florio, on May 4, 2016. As of 2018, she is studying political science at Fordham University part-time.

== Selected repertoire ==
Bouder's repertoire with the New York City Ballet includes:

- Apollo (Polyhymnia)
- Coppélia (Swanilda)
- Dances at a Gathering
- The Firebird
- Harlequinade (Colombine, Lead Alouette)
- "Emeralds" and "Rubies" from Jewels
- A Midsummer Night's Dream (Divertissement, Butterfly)
- The Nutcracker (Sugarplum Fairy, Dewdrop, Marzipan)
- Other Dances
- Raymonda Variations
- Serenade
- The Sleeping Beauty (Aurora, Diamond)
- Swan Lake (Odette/Odile, Pas de Quatre)
- La Sylphide (The Sylph)
- Symphony in C (First and Third Movements)
- Tschaikovsky Pas de Deux
- La Valse

=== Created roles ===
- Acheron
- Bal de Couture
- Broken Promise
- Clearing Dawn
- Concerto DSCH
- "The Blue Necklace" from Double Feature (Mabel)
- Grazioso
- Lineage
- Luce Nascosta
- New Blood
- Outlier
- The Runaway
- Shambards
- Soirée
- SOMETHING TO DANCE ABOUT Jerome Robbins, Broadway to Ballet
- Viva Verdi
- Year of the Rabbit
