= Maria Khoreva =

Russian ballet dancer (born 2000)

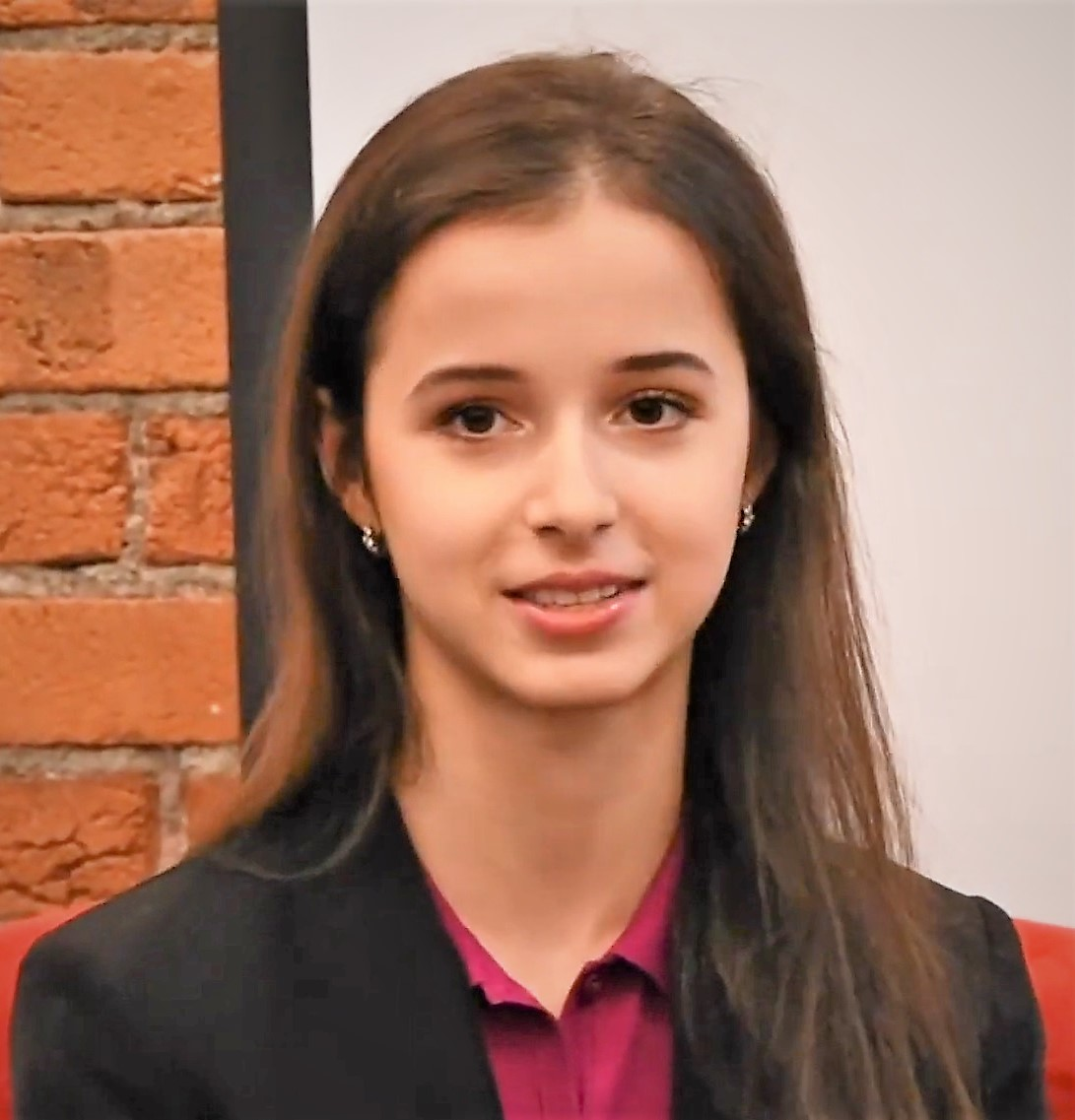
- Khoreva in 2020
- Born: Maria Vladimirovna Khoreva; July 3, 2000 (age 25); Saint Petersburg, Russia
- Education: Vaganova Ballet Academy
- Occupation: Ballet Dancer
- Career
- Current group: Mariinsky Ballet

Maria Vladimirovna Khoreva (Russian: Мария Владимировна Хорева; born 3 July 2000) is a Russian ballet dancer and a first soloist of the Mariinsky Ballet since 2018.

== Early life ==
Khoreva was born on 3 July 2000 in Saint Petersburg, Russia. Before being accepted to the Vaganova Ballet Academy, Khoreva practiced rhythmic gymnastics for seven years.

While at the Vaganova Academy, Khoreva was taught by professor Lyudmila Kovaleva, who also taught Diana Vishneva and Olga Smirnova. Khoreva was one of only a handful of students in her year to graduate with an honors diploma. In her final year of study, Khoreva performed the following roles with the Academy both domestically and internationally:

- Dance of the Hours: Night
- Suite en Blanc: Flute, Adagio
- Le Réveil de Flore: Flora, Aurora
- The Fairy Doll: Fairy Doll
- The Nutcracker: Masha

== The Mariinsky ==
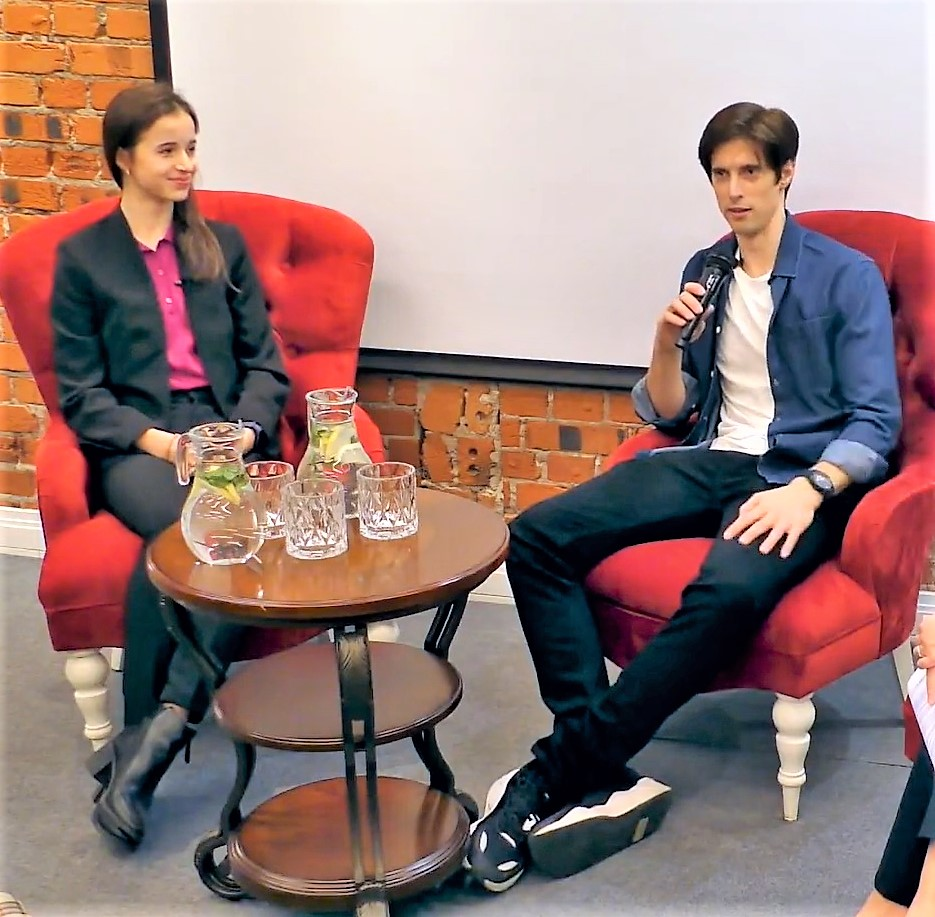
Khoreva (left) with former Mariinsky principal Xander Parish in 2020

Khoreva joined the Mariinsky Ballet in 2018 after graduating from the Vaganova Academy. In the summer before the start of her first season with the company, she debuted as Terpsichore in George Balanchine's Apollo alongside former Mariinsky principal Xander Parish in the title role.

In the fall of 2018, Khoreva debuted in Le Corsaire as one of the trio of Odalisques and as one of the Prince's friends in the Swan Lake pas de trois. In October, she danced the title role in Paquita, a rarity for such a recent graduate, and at the end of the month was promoted from the corps de ballet to first soloist, a rank just one step below principal dancer.

Her repertoire with the Mariinsky thus far includes:

- Don Quixote: Kitri, Queen of the Dryads
- Giselle: Giselle
- La Bayadère: Nikiya
- Le Corsaire: Medora, Trio of Odalisques
- Legend of Love: Shyrin
- The Nutcracker: Masha
- Paquita: Paquita
- Raymonda: Raymonda
- Sleeping Beauty: Princess Aurora, Princess Florine
- Swan Lake: Odette/Odile, Friends of the Prince
- Apollo: Terpsichore
- Jewels: Diamonds
- A Midsummer Night's Dream: Titania (Pas de deux from Act II)
- Serenade: Soloist

Khoreva is coached by former Mariinsky soloist Elvira Tarasova.

== Public life ==
Khoreva is widely known on Instagram under the handle @marachok. She documents her day-to-day life as a dancer on the account in both English and Russian, initially at the Vaganova Academy and now at the Mariinsky, and over the years has amassed over 500,000 followers. She is a spokesperson for the sportswear brand Nike, Inc. and an ambassador for Bloch dancewear.

Beginning in November 2020, Khoreva appeared on the third season of the Russian ballet competition television show Большой балет (Grand Ballet) aired on Russia-K. While he did not compete, she was partnered by Mariinsky principal dancer Vladimir Shklyarov for the show. During the third week of competition, Khoreva received the show's first ever perfect score for her performance of a variation from Paquita. She later won the competition overall in December.

Khoreva published a book titled Teach Me Ballet: How to Educate Your Body in December 2020.
