= Andrey Ermakov =

Russian ballet dancer

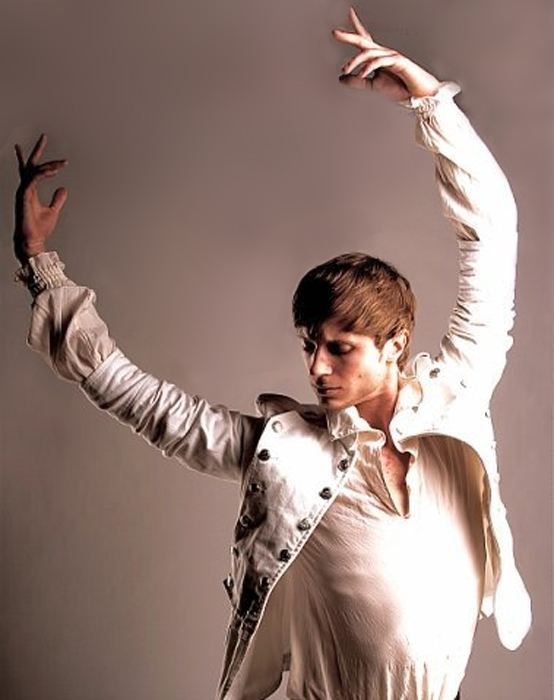
- Born: May 27, 1987 (age 39); St. Petersburg, Russia
- Citizenship: Russia
- Education: Vaganova Ballet Academy
- Occupation: ballet dancer
- Years active: 2005 – present
- Height: 195 cm (6 ft 5 in)
- Career
- Current group: Mariinsky Ballet

Andrey Ermakov (Russian: Андрей Андреевич Ермаков), (born May 27, 1987) is a Russian ballet dancer, a winner of 'Soul of Dance' award (Russian 'Ballet' magazine, 2013), who performs as a principal with the Mariinsky Ballet (formerly the Kirov Ballet).

== Biography ==
Andrey Ermakov was born in Leningrad into a family of workers; at present his mother is an entrepreneur and his father is a shipwright. Ermakov began his professional training at the age of 10 when he entered Vaganova Academy of Russian Ballet in Saint Petersburg, where he was tutored by Evgeny Scherbakov, Vitaly Tsvetkov and others.

Upon his graduation from the Academy in 2005, he was invited by three Saint Petersburg theatres to join. He chose to join the Mariinsky ballet. In the Mariinsky he has been coached by professor Gennady Selutsky, a former ballet dancer, renowned ballet professional, Honored Art Worker of Russian Federation.

During his first years at Mariinsky he appeared as soloist in the premiere of Peter Quanz's ballet Aria Suspended to Igor Stravinsky's music of Symphony in C dedicated to 125th anniversary of the composer, and in George Balanchine's La Valse; he also toured with the Mariinsky Ballet Company to Great Britain, Germany, France, Italy, Spain, the USA, Israel, Japan, China, Thailand and Taiwan.

Then he began appearing as Vaslav in The Fountain of Bakhchisarai, and after that other leading parts followed - in George Balanchine's Serenade, Emeralds etc. At the age of 20 he danced Ali in Le Corsaire, one of the most technically and emotionally demanding male ballet parts. Later Ermakov added many principal male ballet parts to his wide repertoire and now performs not only with Mariinsky, his home ballet company, but also takes part in ballet galas and performances with other troupes as a guest artist.

Ermakov is very convincing in heroic, romantic or dramatic ballet roles, both in classical and modern repertoire. His dancing is known for characterization, rare manly athleticism, elegance, virtuosity, great stage presence, technical strength and purity of the great Vaganova style.

For several years Ermakov was a steady ballet partner of People's Artist of Russia, prima-ballerina Ulyana Lopatkina. As Lopatkina's partner he took part in a series of Gala Concerts "Ulyana Lopatkina and stars" and in "Anna Karenina", a two-act ballet choreographed by Alexei Ratmansky to Rodion Shchedrin's music, starring Ulyana Lopatkina as Karenina, Ermakov as Count Vronsky and Victor Baranov as Karenin filmed by Telmondis (France) for Mezzo TV. November 28, 2014 saw the premiere of "Anna Karenina" on Mezzo TV. Valery Gergiev conducted.

In January 2018 Ermakov acquired a status of individual entrepreneur and opened up a car service. As of May, 2020 Ermakov's car service has been out of business.

== Personal life ==
External images
- Andrey Ermakov with Veronika Akhmadieva at a charity gala, Alexandrinsky theatre, SPb, June, 2017
- Veronika, Ermakov's life companion, and her surfing coach in Sri Lanka, March, 2018

Since autumn of 2016 Ermakov has been in a relationship with Veronika Akhmadieva, a singer, a very engaging contemporary dancer and a small entrepreneur, 4 years his senior, divorced, childless.

== Awards ==
- 'Soul of Dance' award (Russian 'Ballet' magazine, 2013, 'Rising Star' category)

== Repertoire at the Mariinsky Theatre ==
Rôle	Ballet	Choreographer	Composer
Conrad; Ali	Le Corsaire	Pyotr Gusev, Jules Perrot, Marius Petipa, Oleg Vinogradov	Adolphe Adam, Léo Delibes, Riccardo Drigo, Cesare Pugni
Solor	La Bayadere	Marius Petipa	Ludwig Minkus
Count Albrecht	Giselle	Jean Coralli, Jules Perrot	Adolphe Adam
Basilio	Don Quixote	Alexander Gorsky, Marius Petipa	Ludwig Minkus
Romeo	Romeo and Juliet	Leonid Lavrovsky	Sergei Prokofiev
Von Rothbart	Swan Lake	Lev Ivanov, Konstantin Sergeyev	Pyotr Ilyich Tchaikovsky
Ivan-Tsarevich	The Firebird	Michel Fokine	Igor Stravinsky
Vaslav	The Fountain of Bakhchisarai	Rostislav Zakharov	Boris Asafyev
Ferkhad	Legend of Love	Yury Grigorovich	Arif Melikov
Jose; Torero	Carmen Suite	Alberto Alonso	Georges Bizet, Rodion Shchedrin
Count Vronsky	Anna Karenina	Alexei Ratmansky	Rodion Shchedrin
Spartacus	Spartacus	Leonid Yakobson	Aram Khachaturian
Soloist	Concerto DSCH	Alexei Ratmansky	Dmitri Shostakovich
Soloist	"Infra"	Wayne McGregor	Max Richter
Soloist	In the Night	Jerome Robbins	Frédéric Chopin
Ali-Batyr	Shurale	Leonid Yakobson	Färit Yarullin
Jean de Brienne	Raymonda	Marius Petipa	Alexander Glazunov
Young Man	Leningrad Symphony	Igor Belsky	Dmitry Shostakovich
Soloist	Serenade	George Balanchine	Pyotr Ilyich Tchaikovsky
Soloist	La Valse	George Balanchine	Maurice Ravel
Soloist	Emeralds	George Balanchine	Gabriel Faure
Soloist	Trois gnossiennes	Hans van Manen	Erik Satie
Soloist	Variations for two couples	Hans van Manen	Benjamin Britten, Einojuhani Rautavaara Pelimannit, Stefan Kovács Tickmayer, Astor Piazzolla
Soloist	5 tango's	Hans van Manen	Astor Piazzolla
Soloist	Le Parc	Angelin Preljocaj	Wolfgang Amadeus Mozart
Soloist	Diamonds	George Balanchine	Pyotr Ilyich Tchaikovsky
Soloist	Grand Pas Classique	Victor Gsovsky	Daniel Auber
Armand (adagio)	Marguerite and Armand	Frederick Ashton	Franz Liszt
Orion	Sylvia	Frederick Ashton	Léo Delibes
John the Baptist (pas de deux)	La tragédie de Salomé	Emil Faski	Florent Schmitt
Soloist	Without	Benjamin Millepied	Frédéric Chopin
Soloist	Ballet No.2	Maxim Petrov	Alexander Tsfasman
Soloist	Second I	Ksenia Zvereva	Philip Glass
Soloist	Aria Suspended	Peter Quanz	Igor Stravinsky
Lysander; Titania’s Cavalier	A Midsummer Night's Dream	George Balanchine	Felix Mendelssohn
Big Horses	The Little Humpbacked Horse	Alexei Ratmansky	Rodion Shchedrin

== Filmography ==
- "Willow (Palm) Sunday", RWS – Санкт-Петербург, 2009.
- "Three centuries of Saint Petersburg ballet". Ballet gala. Россия К, 2012.
- "Swan lake" in 3D. Swan Lake 3D - Live from the Mariinsky Theatre. Cameron Pace Group, 2013.
- "Tango-gala", "Россия К", 2013.
- "Ouliana Lopatkina, une étoile russe". Marlène Ionesco for Mezzo TV, 2014.
- Anna Karenina, Alexei Ratmansky's ballet to Rodion Schedrin's music. Telmondis and Mariinsky theatre for Mezzo TV, 2014.
- "Ave Майя" Ballet gala at Bolshoi theatre dedicated to the 90th anniversary of Maya Plisetskaya. November 20, 2015, "Россия К" channel.
