= Oksana Skorik =

Ukrainian-born ballet dancer

- Born: April 20, 1989 (age 37); Kharkiv, Soviet Union
- Occupation: Ballet dancer
- Years active: 2007-Present
- Height: 5 ft 8 in (173 cm)
- Dancing career
- Current group: Mariinsky Ballet
- Dances: La Sylphide, Giselle, La Bayadère, The Sleeping Beauty, Swan Lake, Raymonda, The Nutcracker, Le Corsaire, Don Quixote, Grand Pas Classique, Chopiniana, The Legend of Love, Carmen, Ondine
- Website: Mariinsky Ballet - Oksana Skorik

Oksana Skorik (Ukrainian: Оксана Скорик, born April 20, 1989) is a professional ballet dancer from Kharkiv, Ukraine and Principal Dancer of the Mariinsky Ballet. She joined the Mariinsky Ballet in 2007 after graduating from the Perm State Choreographic College in Russia. She was the subject of David Kinsella's documentary A Beautiful Tragedy and was featured on RT Documentary's Ballet, Sweat and Tears.

== Early life ==
Skorik was born in Kharkiv, Soviet Union on April 20, 1989. It was decided by her mother that she was going to be a ballet dancer ever since she was born, and the days after her 5th birthday, her mother took her to Perm School of Dance where she would attend ballet classes and board every year until her graduation at the age of 18. During her time in Perm School of Dance, Skorik suffered from anorexia due to the harsh comments of teachers and staff of the school, who would often compare students with each other. In 2008, A Beautiful Tragedy, a documentary directed by David Kinsella focused on 15-year-old Oksana's journey through ballet school and her battle with anorexia. The documentary followed her during one year (2004-2005) and expressed her innermost feelings about ballet and her relationship with food.

On February 26, 2019 Oksana gave birth to a son named Ostap.

== Mariinsky Ballet ==
Skorik was offered a contract with the Mariinsky Ballet in 2007 as a coryphée until she was promoted to first soloist in 2012. She was promoted to prima ballerina on stage at the Segerstrom Performing Arts Center after a performance of Raymonda on September 25, 2015. She has toured with the Mariinsky Ballet to the United States, Japan, and Europe.

== Repertoire ==
- La Sylphide (Sylph); choreography by August Bournonville, revised version by Elsa-Marianne von Rosen.
- Giselle (Giselle, Monna, Zulma); choreography by Jean Coralli, Jules Perrot and Marius Petipa.
- La Bayadère (Nikia, Trio of Shades); choreography by Marius Petipa, revised version by Vladimir Ponomarev and Vakhtang Chabukiani.
- The Sleeping Beauty (Princess Aurora, Lilac Fairy, Princess Florine); choreography by Marius Petipa, revised version by Konstantin Sergeyev.
- Swan Lake (Odette-Odile, Swans, Two Swans); choreography by Marius Petipa and Lev Ivanov, revised version by Konstantin Sergeyev.
- Raymonda (Raymonda); choreography by Marius Petipa, revised version by Konstantin Sergeyev.
- The Nutcracker (Masha); choreography Vasily Vainonen.
- Le Corsaire (Medora); production by Pyotr Gusev after the composition and choreography by Marius Petipa.
- Don Quixote (Kitri, Queen of the Dryads); choreography by Alexander Gorsky.
- Grand Pas Classique; choreography by Viktor Gsovsky.
- Chopiniana (Nocturne, Mazurka, Seventh Waltz, First Waltz); choreography by Michel Fokine.
- Serenade; choreography by George Balanchine
- Symphony in C (II. Adagio, III. Allegro vivace); choreography by George Balanchine
- Jewels (Diamonds, Rubies); choreography by George Balanchine
- A Midsummer Night's Dream (Titania, Act II – Soloist in the Divertissement); choreography by George Balanchine
- Concerto No 2 (Ballet Imperial).; choreography by George Balanchine
- Tchaikovsky Pas de deux; choreography by George Balanchine
- Romeo and Juliet (Juliet); choreography by Leonid Lavrovsky
- The Legend of Love (Mekhmeneh-Bahnu); choreography by Yuri Grigorovich.
- Carmen Suite (Carmen); choreography by Alberto Alonso.
- Ondine (Four Naiads); choreography by Pierre Lacotte.
- Marguerite and Armand (Marguerite); choreography by Frederick Ashton
- Sylvia (Sylvia); choreography by Frederick Ashton
- Le Parc (Soloist); choreography by Angelin Preljocaj
- Paquita (Paquita); choreography by Yuri Smekalov
- Paquita Grand Pas Classique (Variation)
- In the Night; choreography by Jerome Robbins
- Anna Karenina (Anna); choreography by Alexei Ratmansky
- Infra; choreography by Wayne McGregor
- The Bronze Horseman (Queen of the Ball); choreography by Yuri Smekalov

== Accolades ==
- Recipient of the Spirit of Dance prize in the category “Rising Star” (2012).
- Prize-winner at the XII International Ballet Dancers’ and Choreographers’ Competition in Moscow (2nd prize, 2013).
- Recipient of the Leonide Massine Prize in the category "Emerging Talent on the International Scene" (Positano, Italy 2014)
- Nomination for Prix Benois de la Danse (2016)
