= Renata Shakirova =

Ballet dancer

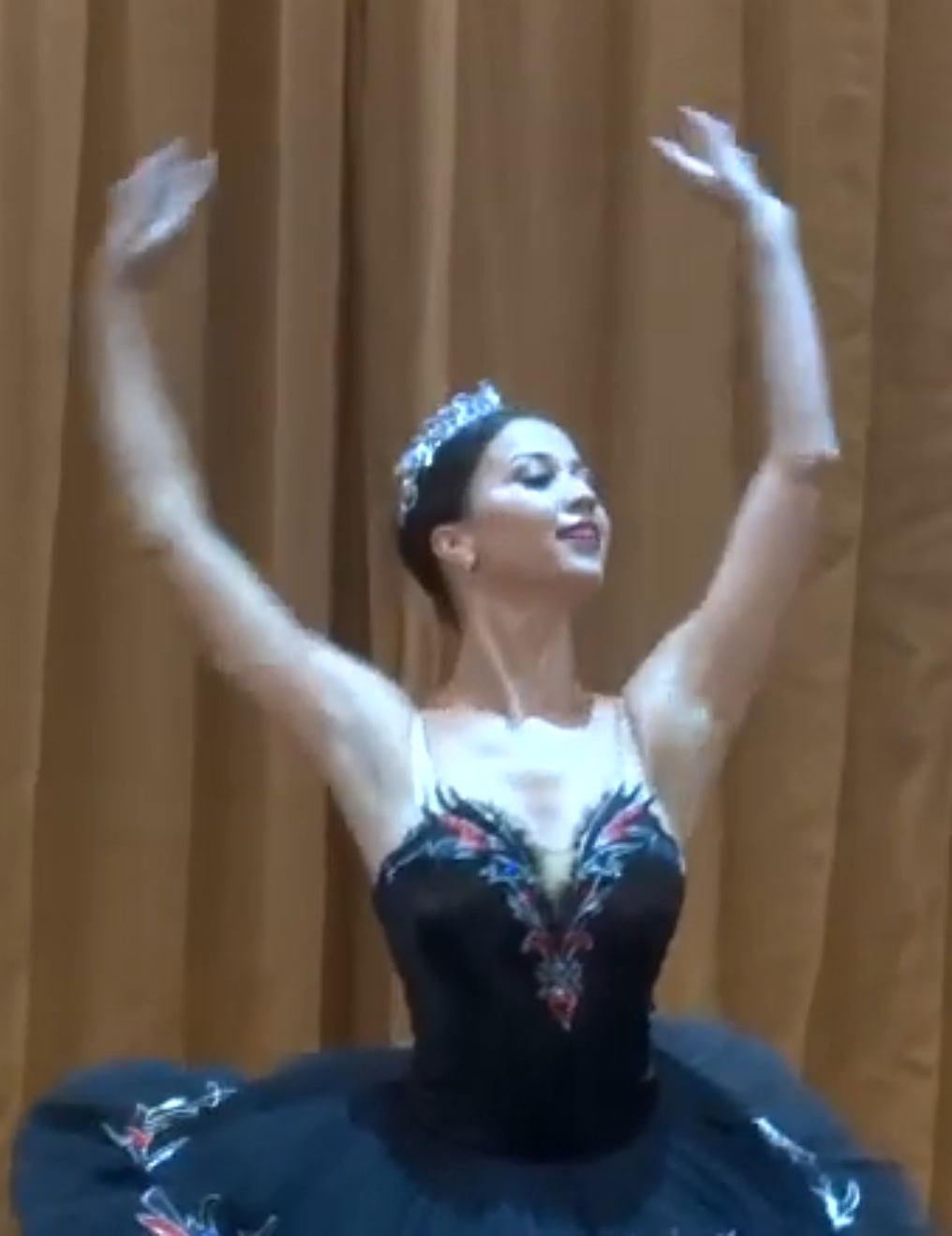
- Renata Shakirova in 2019
- Born: 5 April 1995 (age 30); Tashkent, Uzbekistan
- Occupation: ballet dancer
- Career
- Current group: Mariinsky Ballet

Renata Mukhametovna Shakirova (Russian: Рената Мухаметовна Шакирова; born 5 April 1995 in Tashkent) is a ballet dancer, currently a principal with the Mariinsky Ballet.

== Early life and education ==
Shakirova was born in Tashkent, Uzbekistan. She began her studies at the Bashkir Choreographic College, but then moved to Saint Petersburg with her family when she was admitted to the Vaganova Academy of Russian Ballet and graduated in 2015; her teacher at the Academy was Tatiana Udalenkova. As a student in the Academy, Renata was given the opportunity to dance roles with the Mariinsky Ballet. She began rehearsing with the Mariinsky dancers as a way to stay in shape during the summer vacation from school and it was during those rehearsals she was asked to dance her first role in the theatre: Cupid in Don Quixote.

== Career ==
Renata joined the Mariinsky Ballet upon her graduation and on October 11, 2015 she made her first principal role debut as Kitri in Don Quixote. She was listed among 25 to Watch by Dance Magazine in 2015. In 2016 Renata competed in the Bolshoi Ballet Competition hosted by Russian television network Russia-K with Mariinsky principal dancer Kimin Kim and won first prize.

=== Repertoire ===
Renata has danced ballets choreographed by Marius Petipa, Yury Grigorovich, Alexei Ratmansky, Michel Fokine, George Balanchine, etc.

Marius Petipa

- Giselle (Giselle, Classical Duet)
- The Sleeping Beauty (Aurora, Princess Florine)
- Swan Lake (Odette-Odile, Friends of the Prince, Cygnets, Two Swans)
- La Bayadère (Nikiya, Trio of Shades)
- Raymonda (Henrietta, Grand pas variation)
- Le Corsaire (Gulnare, Trio of Odalisques)
- Don Quixote (Kitri, Amour, Flower Girls, Grand pas variation)
- The Pharaoh's Daughter (Ramzé)

Yuri Grigorovich

- The Legend of Love (Shyrin, Gold Dance)
- The Stone Flower (Katarina, The Mistress of the Copper Mountain)

Alexei Ratmansky

- Concerto DSCH
- The Little Humpbacked Horse (Tsar Maiden)
- Cinderella (Cinderella)
- Pierrot Lunaire

George Balanchine

- Jewels (Rubies soloist)
- Apollo (Polyhymnia, Calliope)
- A Midsummer Night's Dream (pas de deux in Act II )
- Symphony in C (III. Allegro vivace, IV.Allegro vivace)
- Swan Lake

Other choreographers

- Anyuta (Anyuta); choreography by Vladimir Vasiliev
- Carmen Suite (Carmen); choreography by Alberto Alonso
- Romeo and Juliet (Juliet, Juliet's Companions); choreography by Leonid Lavrovsky
- Paquita (Paquita, Carducha); production by Yuri Smekalov
- Diana and Acteon Pas de Deux; choreography by Agrippina Vaganova
- Le Carnaval (Butterfly); choreography by Michel Fokine
- The Nutcracker (Masha); choreography by Vasili Vainonen
- Shurale (Syuimbike); choreography by Leonid Yakobson
- Adagio Hammerklavier; choreography by Hans van Manen
- Bambi (Butterfly) and Violin Concerto No. 2; choreography by Anton Pimonov
- The Bronze Horseman (Parasha); choreography by Yuri Smekalov
- Pulcinella (Pimpinella); choreography by Ilya Zhivoi
