= Jerrold Fisher =

American composer, conductor, singer, arranger and musician

Jerrold Fisher is an American composer, conductor, singer, arranger and musician. In 1970, he was Acting Music Director and Conductor of the Syracuse Symphony Orchestra and Assistant Conductor of the Haddonfield Symphony Orchestra (New Jersey) for seven seasons. Fisher has received numerous awards, including grants from the National Endowment for the Arts, The New York State Council on the Arts, and the Martha Baird Rockefeller Fund for Music/The American Music Center.

Jerrold has appeared on stage in many roles, including Rodolpho in Verdi's La Traviata, the title role in Offenbach's Tales of Hoffmann, and El Gallo in The Fantasticks.

Fisher conducted the Shawnee Press recording choir in the mid 1970s which became the foundation of the Pocono Choral Society. He was the founding and only music director of the Choral Society based in Stroudsburg, Pennsylvania from 1981 to 2010, when it disbanded.

Fisher was Associate Conductor for the Cincinnati Opera's 1990 Summer Festival and is the founder and artistic director of the Pocono Pops Orchestra and Chorus. His internationally acclaimed restoration of John Philip Sousa's The Glass Blowers premiered in July 2000 at Glimmerglass Opera and opened at the New York City Opera in April 2002.

His original, commissioned work "Love Songs" was performed by the combined voices of the Pocono Choral Society and the University of Scranton Singers in May 2004. Jerrold also composed "Songs of Youth and Discovery," a five-part song cycle written with lyrics by Lawrence Leritz, which premiered in 2007 at the Sherman Theatre in Shroudsburg, by the Pocono Choral Society.
