= Alla Sizova =

Russian ballet dancer

- Born: 22 September 1939; Moscow, Soviet Union
- Died: 23 November 2014 (aged 75); St. Petersburg, Russia
- Occupation: Ballerina
- Spouse: Mikhail Serebrennikov
- Career
- Former groups: Kirov Ballet

Alla Sizova (22 September 1939 – 23 November 2014) was a Russian ballet dancer, best known for her work with the Kirov Ballet. She was one of the four superstar ballerinas of the Soviet Union along with Natalia Makarova, Alla Osipenko and Irina Kolpakova, as well as the preferred dance partner of Rudolf Nureyev before his defection.

== Biography ==
Alla Ivanovna Sizova was born in Moscow on 22 September 1939 to Ivan and Ekaterina Sizov. The family moved to Leningrad shortly after her birth. During the Second World War, she was evacuated to the Urals with her mother and sister, while her father remained in Leningrad.

After the war, Sizova studied at the Vaganova Academy of Russian Ballet, where she was taught by Natalia Kamkova. Among her classmates was Rudolf Nureyev, with whom she performed the Le Corsaire duet in a school graduation film, which attracted the attention of the Kirov Ballet. The two were recruited by the Kirov directly as soloists.

Despite the success of their partnership for the Kirov Ballet, Sizova and Nureyev both felt it necessary to bring their families to live with them in their apartment (which they were forced to share) and act as a buffer.

Following Nureyev's defection in 1961 during a tour in London, Sizova's family was closely questioned by the KGB, resulting in her mother's mental breakdown. Upon her return to the USSR, Sizova refused to condemn his actions, although she questioned why he would leave to perform in foreign ballets she considered inferior.

In the early 1970s, Sizova married Mikhail Serebrennikov, a television producer. They had a son, Ilya, born 1974.

Following her husband's death in 1980, Sizova moved to the United States. Sizova's son died in 2004, whereupon she returned to Russia where she led a reclusive life. In the late 2000s, she developed Alzheimer's disease. She died of cancer in St. Petersburg on 23 November 2014.

== Career ==
Sizova joined the Kirov Ballet as soloist in 1958 and became principal shortly after. Her first full part at the Kirov was as Masha in The Nutcracker. Between 1958 and 1961, she performed fourteen major roles. She starred in The Sleeping Beauty and Giselle. The Kirov recognised her talent of musicality and vulnerability, and gave her the leading part in Igor Belsky's balletic setting of Shostakovich's Leningrad Symphony.

Sizova's extraordinary high jumps and technical skills led Leningrad critics to call her Flying Sizova.

After Nureyev's departure, Sizova continued her career with a new partner, Yuri Soloviev, with whom she performed roles of great sensitivity and demonstrated the highest achievement of the Kirov's training.

Between 1964 and 1966, Sizova required extensive treatment for spinal injuries caused by the landings from her high jumps. In the 1970s, her tours with the Kirov in London were widely anticipated and acclaimed.

Sizova's final appearance on-stage was in 1988 in Chopiniana. She then taught for three years at the Vaganov school.

From 1991, Sizova taught at the Kirov Academy of Ballet in Washington, with her ex-Kirov colleague Oleg Vinogradov.

== Acclaim ==
Amongst other roles, Sizova received great acclaim as Princess Aurora in the 1964 Kirov production Tchaikovsky's The Sleeping Beauty opposite Yuri Soloviev.

Nureyev is rumoured to have said in his later years that Sizova was the only thing that could conceivably entice him back to the Soviet Union.

Sizova was awarded the Soviet Union's highest artistic honour, the People's Artist of the USSR in 1983.

== See also ==
- List of Russian ballet dancers
