= The Whims of the Butterfly =

1889 ballet by Marius Petipa

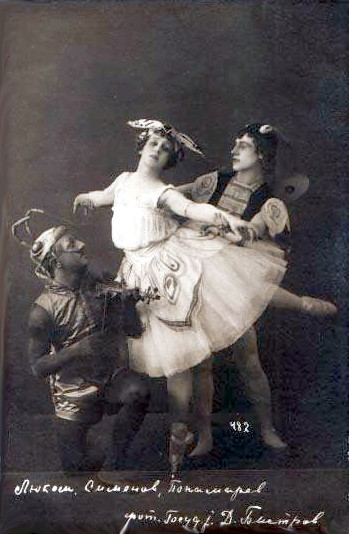
Victor Aleksandrovich Semenov, Elena Mikhailovna Lukom and Vladimir Ponomarev in a 1919 performance.

The Whims of the Butterfly (also known as The Caprices of a Butterfly, or Les Caprices du Papillon) is a ballet in 1 act, with choreography by Marius Petipa, and music by Nikolai Krotkov. Libretto by Marius Petipa, based on the poem The Grasshopper Musician by Yakov Polonsky.

First presented by the Imperial Ballet on June 5/17 (Julian/Gregorian calendar dates), 1889 for the Imperial court at the theatre of Peterhof Palace in St. Petersburg, Russia. The ballet was given a second premiere for the general public at the Imperial Mariinsky Theatre on October 25/November 6, 1889 with the same cast. Principal Dancers - Varvara Nikitina (as the Butterfly), Pavel Gerdt (as the Phoenix Moth), Sergei Litavki (as the Grasshopper), Maria Anderson (as the Fly), Alexander Shiraev (as the Spider), and Sergei Legat (as the Nightingale).

== Revivals/Restagings ==
- Revival by Marius Petipa for the Imperial Ballet. First presented on October 22/November 3, 1895 at the Imperial Mariinsky Theatre. Principal Dancers - Lyubov Roslavleva (as the Butterfly), Nikolai Legat (as the Phoenix Moth), Enrico Cecchetti (as the Grasshopper), Olga Preobrajenskaya (as the Fly), Alexander Shiraev (as the Spider), and Sergei Legat (as the Nightingale).

== Notes ==
- The Whims of the Butterfly was originally produced for the celebrations held at Peterhof Palace in honor of the wedding of the Grand Duke Pavel Alexandrovich (son of Tsar Alexander II and brother of Tsar Alexander III) to the Princess Alexandra of Greece.
- Petipa's choreography for The Whims of the Butterfly was notated in the method of Stepanov Choreographic Notation by the Imperial Ballet's régisseur and his team of notators, and is today included in the Sergeyev Collection.
