= Kimin Kim =

Korean-Russian Ballet Dancer

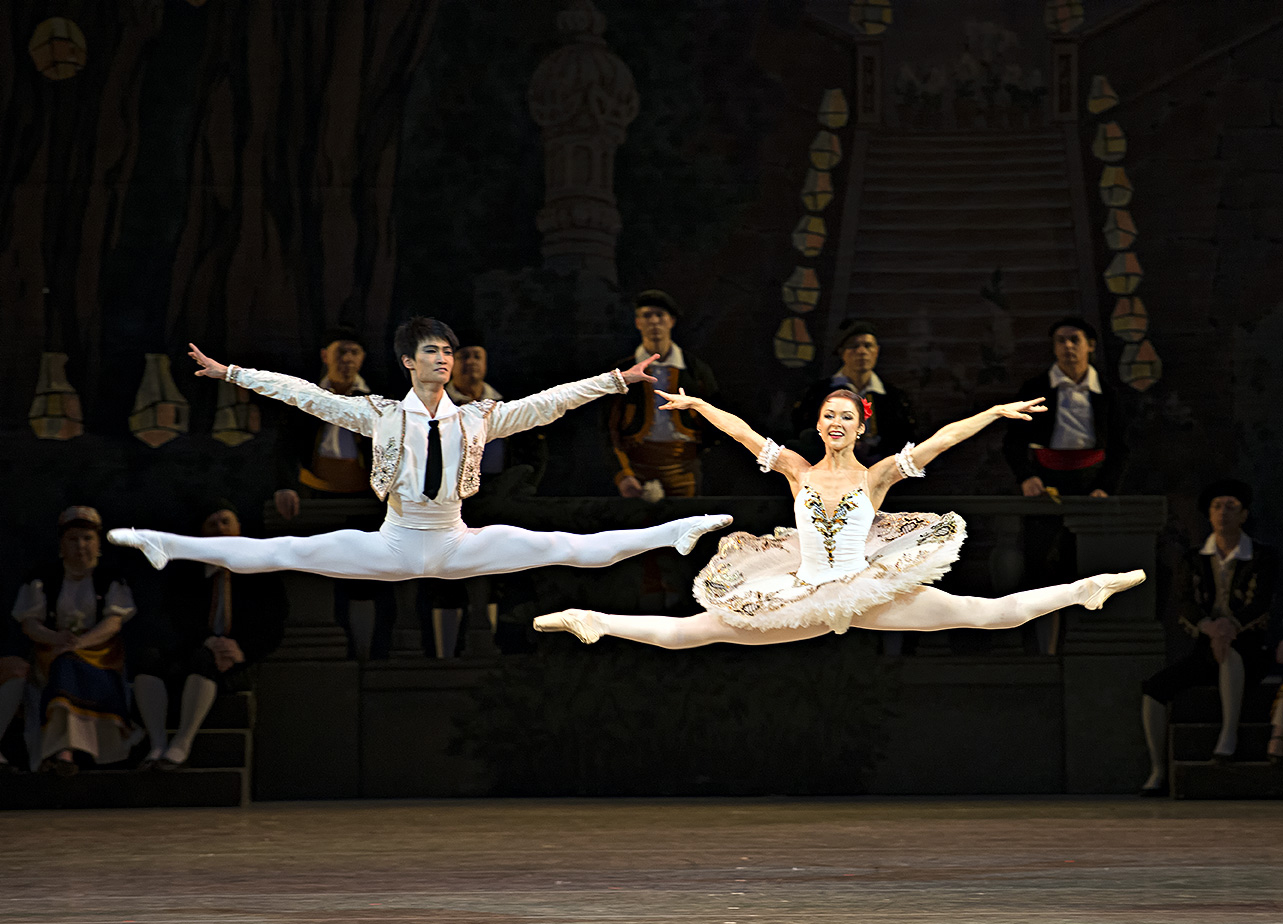
- Kimin Kim (left) in a leap with Elena Evseeva, in the ballet Don Quixote.
- Born: 28 October 1992 (age 33); Seoul, South Korea
- Education: Korea National University of Arts

Korean name
- Hangul: 김기민
- RR: Gim Gimin
- MR: Kim Kimin
- Website: Mariinsky Theater

Kimin Kim (Korean: 김기민, Russian: Кимин Ким; born October 28, 1992) is a principal dancer with the Mariinsky Ballet in St. Petersburg, Russia. Born in South Korea, he was the first foreign dancer to achieve the highest rank at the Mariinsky. He has also performed as a guest artist with American Ballet Theater. He is especially known for his roles as Ali in Le Corsaire, Basilio in Don Quixote, and Solor in La Bayadère.

== Early life and education ==
Kimin Kim was born on October 28, 1992, in Seoul, South Korea. He studied at the Korea National University of Arts, under the guidance of Vladimir Kim and Margarita Kulik.

== Career ==
Kim joined the Mariinsky in 2012 as an apprentice for half a year before being promoted to soloist. He made his debut as Ali in Le Corsaire.

In 2015, Kim was promoted to principal, becoming the Mariinsky Ballet's first foreign dancer to achieve the title. Concurrently, he was a guest artist with American Ballet Theater, performing La Bayadère.

His classical ballet repertoire includes Albrecht in Giselle, Ta-Hor in La Fille de Pharoan, Solor and Golden Idol in La Bayadère, Prince Desiré in The Sleeping Beauty, Prince Siegfried in Swan Lake, Basilio in Don Quixote, Romeo and Mercutio in Romeo and Juliet, the Nutcracker Prince in The Nutcracker, Ali in Le Corsaire, and Aminta in Sylvia, among others.

Among more contemporary works, Kim has performed in George Balanchine's Jewels, Symphony in C, Midsummer's Night Dream, Tchaikovsky Pas de Deux, Twyla Tharp's Push Comes to Shove, and Angelin Preljocaj's Le Parc, among others.
