= Teryoshkin =

Teryoshkin or Tereshkin (Russian: Терёшкин) is a Russian masculine surname, its feminine counterpart is Teryoshkina or Tereshkina. It may refer to

- Viktoria Tereshkina (born 1983), Russian ballet dancer
- Vladislav Teryoshkin (born 1995), Russian football player
