= The Glass Blowers (operetta) =

Published vocal score. Operetta produced by John Philip Sousa.

Front cover of the 1913 score for The Glass Blowers which was published by the John Church Company.

The Glass Blowers, also known as The American Maid, is an operetta in three acts with music by John Philip Sousa and an English-language libretto by Leonard Liebling. Completed in 1908, the operetta premiered as The Glass Blowers in Rochester, New York in January 1913. By the time the production reached Broadway the following March it had been re-named The American Maid. It was the last operetta with music composed by John Philip Sousa that received a full production. According to 21st century theatre scholar Dan Dietz, The Glass Blowers is "the title by which the work is now best known".

The full libretto seems to have been lost, but fragments of the dialogue between musical numbers were collected from The Library of Congress by Arthur O'Dwyer. The piano/vocal score was published by The John Church Company in 1913. As The Glass Blowers, it was revived in 2000 at the Glimmerglass Opera using a libretto and score crafted by Jerrold Fisher and William Martin from the surviving portion's of Liebling's libretto and a "patchwork of Sousa's scores".

== History ==
=== Creation and pre-Broadway tour ===
The Scranton Times and the Milwaukee Daily News reported that Sousa had completed the score to The Glass Blowers in December 1908 using a libretto by Leonard Liebling. The light opera remained unperformed for several years, and plans to stage the work were not announced until June 1912 when it was reported in the Brooklyn Eagle that The Glass Blowers would be given its premiere in New York City in October 1912. The date of the New York production was pushed back, and it was reported in the Boston Evening Transcript that the operetta would be produced in Rochester, New York in January 1913 prior to a run in New York City.

The Glass Blowers premiered at the Shubert Theatre in Rochester, New York on January 27, 1913 where it ran for three performances. The production then toured to the Garrick Theatre in Detroit where it played in early February 1913. Other theaters the production toured to prior to reaching the New York stage included the Wysor Grand Opera House in Muncie, Indiana, the Gennett Theatre in Richmond, Indiana, the Grand Opera House in Anderson, Indiana, the Murat Theatre in Indianapolis, and the Lexington Opera House in Kentucky.

=== Broadway ===
On February 16, 1913 it was announced in the press that the name of the show would be changed to The American Maid for its Broadway run as the show's producer, John Cort, was unhappy with the original title. It opened at the Broadway Theatre on 41st Street on March 3, 1913. Despite receiving mixed but generally positive reviews it ran for only sixteen performances; closing on March 15, 1913. The New York Times review said the production was "well-liked" and had some novelties.

George Jean Nathan of The Green Book Magazine in July 1913 said "Early last spring, it may be remembered by the four or five persons who through some inscrutable accident happened to see it, a piece was shown on Broadway for a couple of nights or so, said piece being called “The American Maid,” the sounds of speech in which were the labor of Herr Leonard Liebling and the other sounds the labor of Herr J. P. Sousa. Although, to be sure, it is the critical custom always to wax saucy over the lyrics in all native-made musical shows (albeit with adipose justice), the epic truth is that the lyrics in this particular exhibition were as doltish and dolorous a set of rhymes as ever extruded their visages from the proscenium arch."

=== Revival productions ===
A version of the operetta edited by Jerrold Fisher was staged by Glimmerglass Opera in 2000 and 2002. For that production "Martin has fashioned a libretto from original prompt books and other fragmentary source materials, and Fisher, a conductor and arranger, has reconstructed the music from piano scores and incomplete manuscript orchestrations. Jonathan Sheffer, who is making an impressive City Opera debut as conductor of "The Glassblowers," altered the orchestration to give it more varied sound." Critic Bernard Holland wrote the following in his review in The New York Times:

"The Glass Blowers is admittedly a period piece, but it is a graceful and vital one. Sousa's joy in adamant forward movement, unequivocal meter and strong downbeats carry over to his stage music. But there is here a paradox of delicacy wedded to muscle: the music sweeps one along. Perhaps too often what the ear expects happens, but there are surprises... Some will find it frivolous: a European-style operetta with a hard, bright American edge. I found it a constant pleasure."

The Victorian Lyric Opera Company of Rockville, Maryland, produced a semi-staged version of The American Maid in 2012.

A reviewer at that production said "I also liked the inclusive of some visual drop-downs with black and white pictures of factories and scenes from battlegrounds which helped to provide context for the romantic and military adventures of the cast. It was interesting to be drawn back to a time in which it was possible to take a little trip to Santiago, Cuba without thought of the political ramifications or any barriers to getting back into the US of A."

== Roles ==
Roles, Broadway cast, 2000 Glimmerglass cast
Role	1913 Broadway cast	Glimmerglass cast
Jack Bartlett, a playboy	John Park	Jeffrey Lentz
Stumpy, Jack Bartlett’s valet	Georgie Mack	N/A
Duke of Branford, a wealthy Englishman	Charles Brown	Richard Whitehouse
Mr. Silas Pompton, a glassworks tycoon	Edward Wade	Scott Ramsey
Col. Vandeveer, Annabelle’s father	George O'Donnell	Dean Elzinga
Annabelle Vandeveer, a society girl	Louise Gunning	Maria Kanyova
Geraldine Pompton, a society girl	Dorothy Maynard	Jennifer Dudley
Mrs. Vandeveer	Adele Archer	Aidan L Soder
Mrs. Pompton	Maude Turner Gordon	Denise Knowlton
Rose Green	Marguerite Farrell	N/A
Nellie Brown	Mary Smith	Kristine Winkler
Gawkins, the Vandeveers’ butler	J. Kern	Nathan Wentworth
Footman	Albert Sachs	N/A
Batchman	George Wilson	N/A
First Glassblower	James Yunch	N/A
Second Glassblower	Ella Yunch	N/A
Society friends of Annabelle’
Gladys	Katherine Stossel	Valerie Komar
Helen	Julia Bruns	Jody Sheinbaum
Veronica	Nellie Could	Zara Barrett
Hazel	Marie Elliott	N/A
Alice	Amy Russell	N/A
Beatrice	Irma Bertrand	N/A
Mabel	Marie Dolber	N/A
Edith	Neomi Sumers	N/A
Madge	Marjorie Edwards	N/A
Irene	Carrie Lauders	N/A
Guests of the Vandeveers
Lefty McCarty	John G. Sparks	Joseph Kaiser
Hans Hippel	H. Hooper	Paul Arthur Mow
Pietro Nuttini	Pietro Canova	Hugo Alberto Vera
Characters original to the Glimmerglass Opera production
Count Hohenstaupellaufenwitz	N/A	Gregory Gerbrandt
Countess Hohenstaupellaufenwitz	N/A	Barbara LeMay
Jerry Smith	N/A	Joseph Kaiser
John Smith	N/A	Paul Arthur Mow
James Smith	N/A	Hugo Alberto Vera
Chorus:Guests, servants, glassblowers, working girls, Red Cross nurses, and Cuban girls.

== Music ==
The music shows itself as a cross between the popular operetta styles of Arthur Sullivan and the march styles of Sousa. The main theme throughout the production was made into the band march From Maine To Oregon.

=== Musical numbers ===
Order of music.

Overture

Act 1

- Reception Scene: It would be very hard to get
- Song and Chorus: Cleopatra's a Strawb'ry Blonde
- Duet: In the Dimness of Twilight
- Trio and Chorus: The Matrimonial Mart
- Vocal Scherzo: This is My Busy Day
- Duet: Nevermore
- Finale 1

Act 2

- Factory Scene
- Sextet: Cheer Up
- Song: The Dinner Pail
- Valse Song: The Crystal Lute
- Song: The American Girl
- Finale 2

Act 3

- Entre Act
- Dream Picture: The Bivouac
- The Reveille: I can't get 'em up
- Song: When You Change your Name to Mine
- Marconigrams
- Song: The Red Cross Nurse
- Melodrama
- Finale 3
