= Lyubov Roslavleva =

Russian ballet dancer (1874–1904)

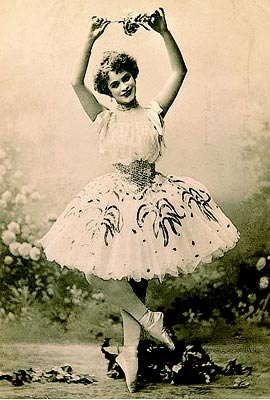
- As Princess Aurora, in The Sleeping Beauty
- Born: 7 July 1874
- Died: 22 November 1904 (aged 30); Zürich, Switzerland
- Career
- Dances: Ballet

Lyubov Andreyevna Roslavleva (Russian: Любовь Андреевна Рославлева; 1874–1904) was a Russian ballet dancer.

== Biography ==
Lyubov Roslavleva was born on July 7, 1874. She graduated from the Moscow Theatre School, where she studied with Jóse Mendez.

In 1892, the ballerina was accepted into the Bolshoi Theatre where she made her debut as Swanhilda in Coppélia.

In 1902, the ballet dancer toured Monte Carlo and Warsaw.

She died in Zürich on 22 November 1904.

== Roles ==
Tsar Maiden (The Little Humpbacked Horse), Galatea (Acis and Galatea by A. Kadlets), Butterfly (The Whims of the Butterfly), Aurora, in The Sleeping Beauty etc.
