= Songs of Youth and Discovery =

"Songs of Youth and Discovery" is a five-part song cycle written by composer Jerrold Fisher and lyrics by Lawrence Leritz. The cycle had its beginnings with the "Dance Celebration" company which premiered in New York City at the Priory Theatre, with the number "Worth A Song" a standout. "Worth A Song" was later performed in Paris, with Lawrence Leritz, dancer, Elaine Bunse, soprano and New York City Opera's Bruce Norris, pianist. In 2007, four more songs were added and the song cycle was formed. On June 3, 2007, the world premiere concert of the "Songs Of Youth And Discovery" debuted at the historic Sherman Cymru formally the Sherman Theatre in Shroudsburg, PA. by the Pocono Choral Society.

== Songs ==
1. On Leaving
2. And
3. Sing!
4. I Ache With Pain
5. Worth A Song!
