= Fonteyn & Nureyev on Broadway =

Fonteyn & Nureyev on Broadway was presented at the Uris Theatre from 18 November to 29 November 1975. The show was a major Broadway and dance event; it was the farewell performance of the legendary ballet duo of Margot Fonteyn and Rudolf Nureyev. The sold-out run included the Frederick Ashton ballet Marguerite and Armand. Other notable dancers included Lawrence Leritz, Daniel Lommel and The Murray Louis Dance Company.
