= Xander Parish =

English ballet dancer

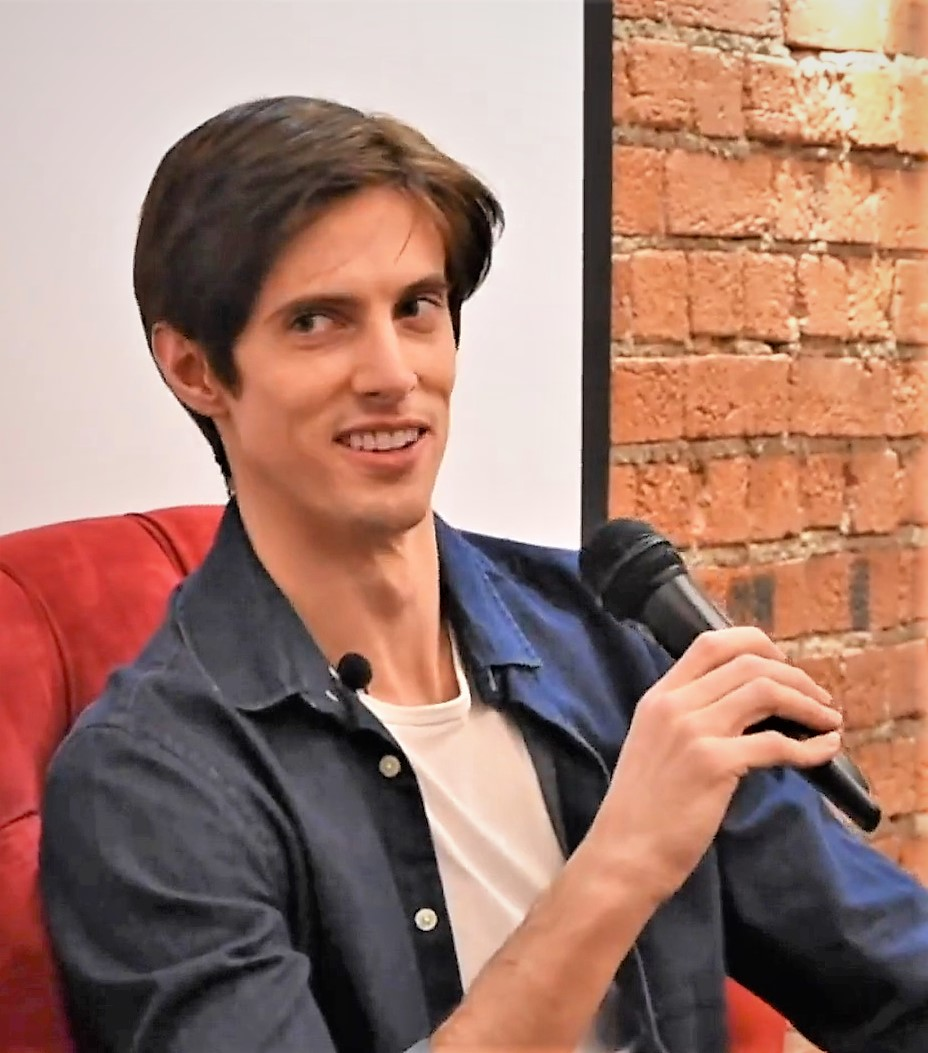
- Born: Alexander Robert Nigel Parish; 1986 (age 39–40); Beverley, East Riding of Yorkshire, England
- Occupation: Ballet dancer
- Title: Principal dancer
- Family: Demelza Parish (sister)
- Awards: Officer of the Order of the British Empire (OBE)
- Career
- Former groups: The Royal Ballet, Mariinsky Ballet, Norwegian National Ballet

Alexander "Xander" Robert Nigel Parish OBE (born 1986) is an English ballet dancer and actor and was the first British dancer to be employed by the Mariinsky Ballet in St. Petersburg, Russia.

== Early life and education ==
Parish was born in Beverley, East Riding of Yorkshire, England. He began dancing at the age of eight at the Skelton-Hooper School of Dance in Kingston upon Hull. Initially aspiring to become a professional cricketer, he attended Hymers College. In April 1998, he accepted a place at the Royal Ballet School. He trained at the Lower School at White Lodge, Richmond Park, from age 11 to 16, and continued at the Upper School from 16 to 19.

== Career ==
In 2005, Parish joined The Royal Ballet as a member of the corps de ballet. After five years performing minor roles, he was noticed by Yuri Fateyev, a ballet master from the Mariinsky Ballet, who was visiting as a guest teacher. In January 2010, Parish joined the Mariinsky Ballet as a coryphée. He made his company debut unexpectedly after three weeks, performing as Beranger in Raymonda due to another dancer's injury. He was promoted to soloist in March 2014 and to principal dancer in July 2017 after a performance of Swan Lake during the Mariinsky Ballet's tour at the Royal Opera House in London.

In March 2021, Parish held his debut photographic exhibition at the Arts Square Gallery in St. Petersburg, featuring 42 photographs shot backstage at the Mariinsky Theatre. The exhibition lasted three weeks.

In early March 2022, following the 2022 Russian invasion of Ukraine, Parish temporarily left Russia. In August 2022, he joined the Norwegian National Ballet.

In November 2023, the Norwegian National Ballet invited Parish to stage his own version of Raymonda Act III, titled Raymonda Suite, for 26 dancers.

In September 2022, Parish formed Reunited in Dance with the support of Elizabeth Segerstrom, aiming to support dancers affected by the Russian invasion of Ukraine. The debut performance was held at the Segerstrom Center for the Arts Concert Hall in October 2022. Parish choreographed a one-act ballet titled The Ballet Class to Tchaikovsky’s Children's Album, featuring 16 dancers accompanied by a live pianist.

=== Acting ===
In 2019, Parish was cast in Olga, a film by Suzanne Gielgud about Olga Spessivtseva, portraying the role of Anton "Pat" Dolin. The film was delayed by the COVID-19 pandemic. In September 2024, he made his stage acting debut in The Gates of Kyiv, a play by Ian Kelly, alongside Stockard Channing, Michael Praed, and Gala Chistiakova at the Theatre Royal Windsor.

== Personal life ==
Parish's sister, Demelza Parish, was previously a dancer with The Royal Ballet.

== Honours and awards ==
=== Honours ===
- Appointed Officer of the Order of the British Empire (OBE) in the 2019 New Year Honours for services to dance and UK-Russia cultural relations.
- Awarded an honorary doctorate from the University of Hull in 2017.

=== Awards ===
- Ursula Moreton Choreographic Award – 1st Prize (2003)
- Ursula Moreton Choreographic Award – 2nd Prize (2004)
- Genée International Ballet Competition – Finalist (2003)
- Genée International Ballet Competition – Silver Medal (2004)
- Young British Dancer of the Year – 2nd Prize (2004)
- Positano Premia La Danza Léonide Massine Emerging Dancer on the International Scene Award (2014)
- Best Young Male Dancer at the 1st Taglioni European Ballet Awards (2014)
- Outstanding Male Performance (Classical) for Apollo at the Critics' Circle National Dance Awards (2014)
