= Perm State Choreographic College =

Location
- 18 Petropavlovskaya; Perm, 614000; Russia

Information
- School type: public, state run
- Established: 1945
- Status: Active
- Specialist: Classical Ballet
- Director: Daria Sosnina
- Gender: Co-educational
- Feeder to: Perm Opera and Ballet Theatre
- Website: www.balletperm.ru
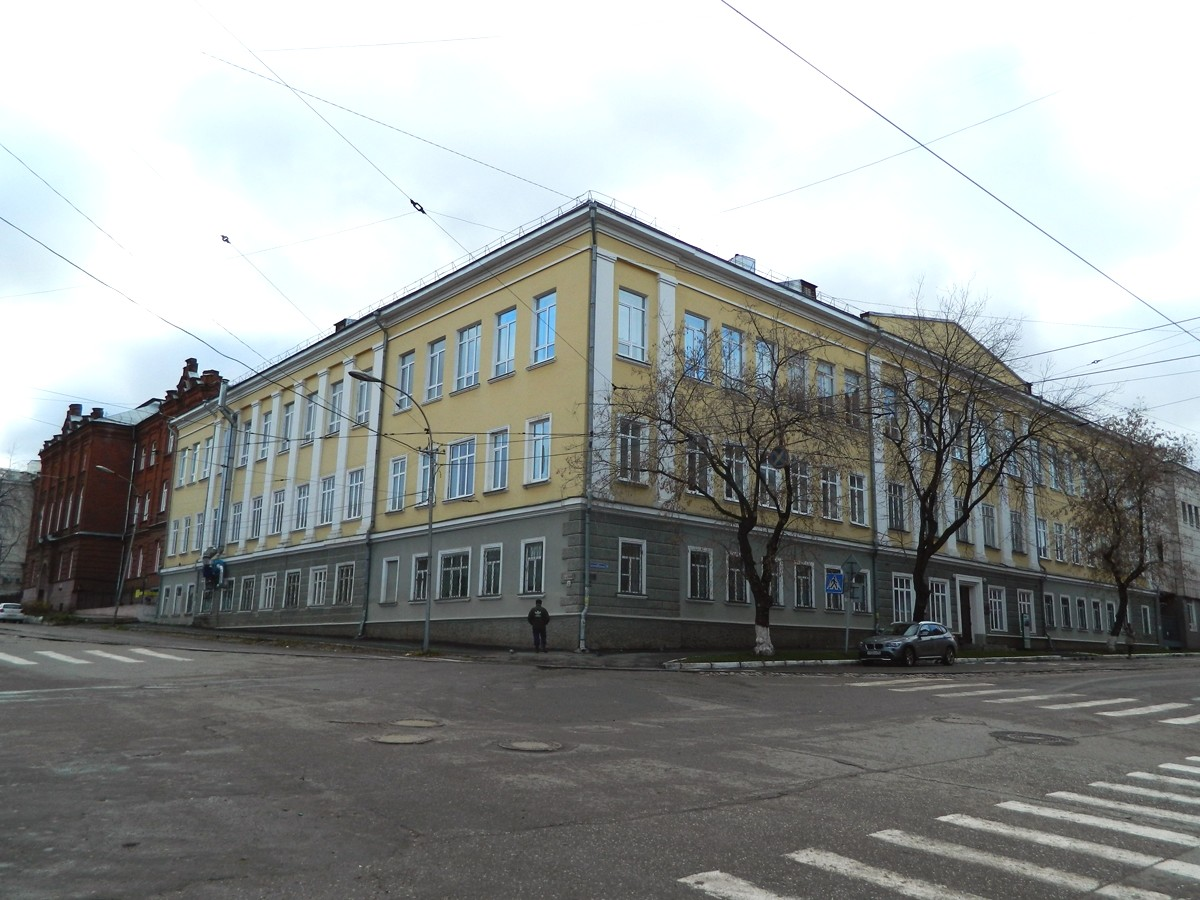

Perm State Choreographic College (Russian: Пермский государственный хореографический колледж, commonly known as the Perm Ballet School) is a professional ballet school based in Perm, Russia, considered the third major ballet school in Russia after those attached to the Bolshoi and the Kirov. It is the associate school of the Perm Opera and Ballet Theatre.

== History ==
The origins of the school lie in the 1941 Siege of Leningrad, during which the ballet and opera companies of the then Kirov Theatre were evacuated to Perm (then known as Molotov), along with the Leningrad Choreographic School. When the Leningrad school returned home in 1944, a choreographic studio was set up at the Molotov Opera and Ballet Theatre (now the Perm Opera and Ballet Theatre) for the local children who had studied there. On 2 April 1945 the studio was reorganised as a choreographic school. The school moved into its present building in 1947, and in 1984 a 286-seat teaching theatre was added to it. It was established as a state-subsidised boarding school. Its first artistic director was Yekaterina Geidenreikh, a colleague of Agrippina Vaganova, who led the school until 1955. Later the school took on Moscow-trained teachers such as Lyudmila Sakharova, who was its director in 2000.

== Method ==
As other ballet schools in Russia, Perm State Choreographic College adopts the prestigious Vaganova method as its training method.

== Alumni ==
- Vadim Muntagirov, born 1990, Principal dancer of the Royal Ballet
- Oksana Skorik, born 1989, Principal dancer of the Mariinsky Ballet
- Nadezhda Pavlova, born 1956, Soloist and Principal dancer with the Bolshoi Ballet 1975-1983
- Olga Chenchikova, born 1956, Principal dancer with the Mariinsky Ballet
- Lyubov Kunakova, 1951-2026, Leading Soloist with Leningrad Kirov Opera and Ballet, Choreographer of the Mariinsky Ballet
- Marat Daukaev, born 1952, Soloist and Principal Dancer with the Leningrad Kirov Opera and Ballet 1972-1992
