= Igor Belsky =

Russian Dancer

Igor Dmitrievich Belsky
- Игорь Дмитриевич Бельский
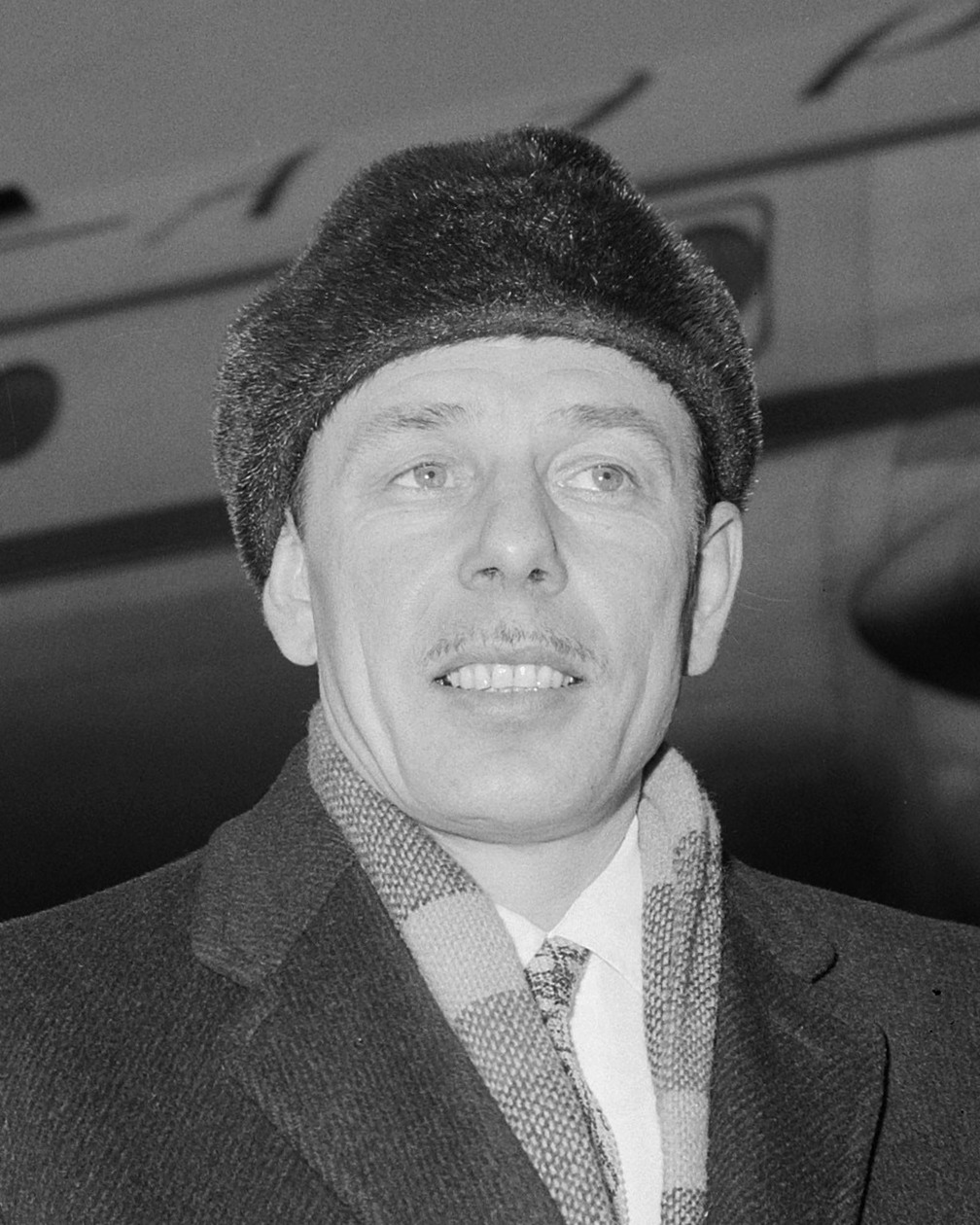
- Igor Belsky in Amsterdam in 1965
- Born: March 28, 1925; Saint Petersburg, Russia
- Died: July 3, 1999 (aged 74); Saint Petersburg, Russia
- Education: Vaganova Academy of Russian Ballet, Russian Academy of Theatre Arts
- Occupations: Ballet dancer, choreographer
- Years active: 1942–1992
- Known for: Kirov Ballet, Maly Drama Theatre, Vaganova Academy of Russian Ballet

Igor Dmitrievich Belsky (Russian: Игорь Дмитриевич Бельский; 28 March 1925, Saint Petersburg, Russia – 3 July 1999, Saint Petersburg) was a Russian ballet dancer and choreographer. After 20 years of solo work (1942–62) he became a chief choreographer of Maly Theatre (1962–73), artistic director of Kirov Ballet (1973–77), artistic director of Cairo Ballet (1977–78), chief ballet master at the Leningrad Music Hall (1979–92), and artistic director of the Vaganova Academy of Russian Ballet.

== Biography ==
Belsky got his passion for ballet from his parents, famous vaudeville dancers. While still studying at the Vaganova Academy, in 1942, he was allowed to perform with the Kirov Ballet due to the lack of male dancers during World War II. In the 1950s he continued his studies at the Russian Academy of Theatre Arts. During his solo career he sought roles that required personality and acting gifts, such as the lead in Shuraleh by Leonid Yakobson (1950) and Negro Mako in The Path of Thunder by Konstantin Sergeyev (1958).

In 1959, while still dancing, he choreographed the two-act The Coast of Hope at the Kirov Ballet. This work was characterized by a simple and clear style, lacking a clutter of props characteristic of the time; it became a great success, launching his directing career. Shortly after becoming chief choreographer of Maly Theatre in Saint Petersburg he retired from dancing. At Maly he choreographed The Hump-Backed Horse (1963, scored by Rodion Shchedrin), Swan Lake (1965), Eleventh Symphony (1966, scored by Dmitri Shostakovich), The Gadfly (1967) and The Nutcracker (1969).

Disappointed with the Maly's preference for lyrical-comedy ballets, he returned to Kirov Ballet to focus on more epic themes. In 1973 he became artistic director and in 1974 choreographed Icarus. After briefly heading the Cairo Ballet in 1977–78 he worked as the chief ballet master at the Leningrad Music Hall (1979–92) and then as the artistic director of the Vaganova Ballet Academy.

In parallel, Belsky had a long career as a teacher, which started with character dance in 1946 at the Vaganova School and continued from 1966 at the St. Petersburg Conservatory. He died of a stroke, aged 74. He was survived by his wife, Lyudmila Alekseeva, a solo dancer from the Kirov Ballet, and a son Nikita.
