= Lawrence Leritz =

American ballet dancer and choreographer

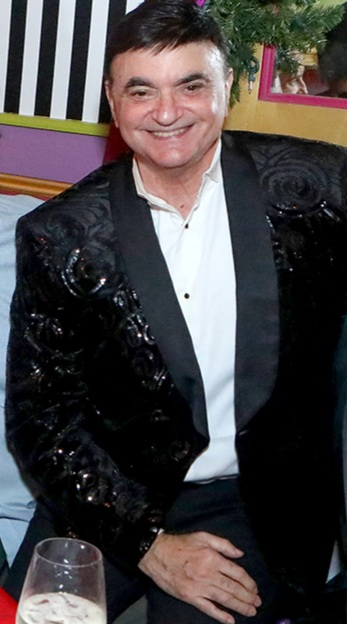
- Lawrence Leritz at The Legacy Awards in Dec. 2021
- Born: September 26, 1962 (age 64); Alton, Illinois

Lawrence Leritz (born September 26, 1962) is an American actor, dancer, singer, producer, director, fitness expert and choreographer.

== Life and career ==
Born in Alton, Illinois, Leritz made his stage debut in the children's chorus of the world stage premiere of Rodgers and Hammerstein's musical State Fair at The Muny, starring Ozzie and Harriet Nelson, directed by James Hammerstein, supervised by Richard Rodgers, conducted by Anton Coppola and choreographed by Tommy Tune.

Leritz moved to New York City with scholarships to the Harkness Ballet, Joffrey Ballet and the School of American Ballet under George Balanchine, studying with Alexandra Danilova, Stanley Williams and the Bolshoi's Māris Liepa. While dancing in a company class at The New York City Ballet, he was discovered by Balanchine ballerina Violette Verdy who invited him to join The Hamburg Ballet. Leritz continued his dancing career on the international stages, starring with Ruth Page's Chicago Ballet, Israel's Bat-Dor Dance Company and with the Paris Opéra on its U.S. tour to the Metropolitan Opera and DC's Kennedy Center. Leritz also appeared as guest artist and choreographer for Plácido Domingo's Los Angeles Music Center Opera and danced in the Joffrey Ballet version of Michel Fokine's "Petrushka" with Rudolf Nureyev at the New York City Center. Leritz created his own company, Dance Celebration, which represented the United States at the International Choreographic Competitions in Paris, performing his signature ballet, "Worth A Song", receiving special congratulations from President Jimmy Carter at the White House in 1979. Leritz produced The 50th Anniversary Gala of The American Guild of Musical Artists, featuring over 300 stars of ballet and opera at The New York State Theater at Lincoln Center in 1986. The Gala's hosts, New York City Opera's Beverly Sills and New York City Ballet's Peter Martins provided the show's highlight, dancing together in the restaged opening of Balanchine's "Vienna Waltzes." Leritz appeared three times on the cover of Dance Pages Magazine, including the Spring 1989 issue, in which he wrote an article which introduced and encouraged bodybuilding for dancers. Appearing on the cover with bodybuilding champion Rich Gaspari, his article helped to change the look of professional dancers. In 2006, Leritz was included in Harvard University's George Balanchine Collection of The New York City Ballet at The Harvard Theatre Collection and The Harvard College Library. Leritz's television dance appearances include the 2013 Emmy Award winning "Night Of Too Many Stars" on Comedy Central, performing as Keitel's wise guy in "Call Me Maybe" with Carly Rae Jepsen and Harvey Keitel at the historic Beacon Theatre (New York City). Leritz was featured in The New York Times dance article, Your First Dance Crush, July 2013.

Leritz was chosen by director/choreographer Jerome Robbins for the second Broadway revival of Fiddler on the Roof with Herschel Bernardi and Maria Karnilova. Other Broadway appearances include Fonteyn & Nureyev on Broadway. Leritz also directed and produced two editions of "Broadway Showstoppers" at NYC's Hudson Theatre and The Town Hall. Leritz returned to co-star at The Muny with Broadway's Judy Kaye, John Reardon, John Schuck, Beth Leavel and his dance partner, Lorene Yarnell in Cole Porter's Can-Can, receiving excellent reviews. The St. Louis Post-Dispatch noted "Can-Can opened in dazzling style, reminiscent of the Muny glory days, weaving a magic spell. Leritz and Yarnell are teamed in exciting style. The dancing is fabulous." Leritz appeared Off-Broadway in "Funding The Arts" at the Baryshnikov Arts Center, acting and dancing the role of J. Edgar. Leritz also appeared in The Joe Layton Tribute at Off-Broadway's St Luke's Theater hosted by Bruce Vilanch, in The Madeline Kahn Tribute, singing at New York's Metropolitan Room and co-hosted the Off-Broadway tribute to dancer Ruth Page.

On television, Leritz had the honor of leading NBC's 2017 annual Macy's Thanksgiving Day Parade as the Taxi Driver. Additional acting roles include 2018 appearances on Amazon's The Marvelous Mrs. Maisel and NBC's Saturday Night Live in the Spiritual Rap Choir with Amy Schumer, CBS's Capitol, ABC's All My Children, Dick Clark's Celebrity Boxing with Ron Palillo and in HBO's Sex And The City; talk shows including The Rosie O'Donnell Show with Liza Minnelli, Maury, CNN's Showbiz Tonight and Entertainment Tonight. Leritz hosted and created the best-selling "DVD Total Stretch! with Lawrence Leritz".

Leritz's many feature films include the 2022 award-winning comedy Love in Kilnerry as Deputy Rory, The Con Is On starring Uma Thurman, The Adjustment Bureau opposite Matt Damon, Julie Taymor's Across the Universe, Dummy with Adrien Brody, Easy Money with Rodney Dangerfield, Legs with Gwen Verdon, Annie with Carol Burnett, and the HBO feature Stag with Ben Gazzara, Kevin Dillon and Taylor Dayne. Leritz co-starred in the 2017 comedy short film, The Pitch.

Leritz is the Spectrum Records recording artist of the dance hit single "Crank It Up" produced by Cory Wade, performing on tour with The Weather Girls, Laura Branigan, Sylvester, Natalie Cole and starred at the Las Vegas Stardust Hotel during its final months. Leritz made his recording debut with the NYC club hit, "It Takes Two To Tango".

Leritz choreographed the Motown feature film musical, Berry Gordy's The Last Dragon, the mime duo Shields & Yarnell for Atlantic City, for MTV and various recording artists. He also choreographed the one-act ballet "Alone" for The Hamburg Ballet, receiving its US premiere in 2018. For Goodtimes Entertainment, Leritz choreographed and co-produced two live action children musicals, Treehouse Trolls Birthday Day and The Forest Of Fun and Wonder. Leritz is also known in the fitness world as the choreographer to many bodybuilding stars, which included the NBC Sports television special "Arnold Schwarzenegger's Bodybuilding Arnold Classic" in 1989 and appears in numerous issues of Joe Weider's Muscle & Fitness and Men's Fitness magazines. In "A Broadway Holiday Concert" for Huntington Disease NY, Leritz choreographed highlights from Grease with several original Broadway cast members.

During the 2003–2004 New York theatre season, Leritz was the producer and choreographer of the long running Off-Broadway show, Boobs! The Musical at The Triad. The New York Times review noted "The six person cast is expertly choreographed by Lawrence Leritz." Boobs! The Musical was nominated for the 2004 MAC Awards for Best Musical Revue and won New Orleans' 2005 Big Easy and Ambie Awards. For television, Leritz produced three seasons of the annual event "Day of Compassion", for which Time magazine honored Leritz as their 1996 Local Hero.

Leritz directed and produced a tribute, hosted by Tyne Daly, to honor Welcome Back, Kotter's Ron Palillo's life and career at NYC's The Triad Theatre, October 3, 2012. Leritz also produced three staged industry readings of Ron Palillo's play, "The Lost Boy" for the New York stage. Broadway's Chad Kimball, Matt Doyle, Jennifer Cody, Sheffield Chastain, Mary Beth Peil, Elizabeth Morton and Celeste Lecesne starred in the initial reading of "The Lost Boy", September 2014, at the Manhattan Theatre Club Studios. Leritz returned to The Triad Theatre to direct A Toast To Harvey! on June 22, 2022 starring Joel Grey, Lee Roy Reams, Tony Yazbeck, Jim Brochu, Anita Gilette, Penny Worth and Marianne Tatum, celebrating the life and career of Harvey Evans.

== Awards, nominations and citations ==
- 2018 The Dancers Over 40 Legacy Award
- 2004 MAC Awards Best Musical Revue (Producer nominee)
- 2005 Big Easy Awards Best Musical (Producer nominee)
- 2006 Teall Awards Best Musical (Producer nominee)
- 2006 Teall Awards Best Choreography (nominee, based on original choreography by Lawrence Leritz)
- 1996 Time magazine's Local Hero
- 1987 Lawrence Leritz Day Proclamation, Alton, Illinois
- 1983 Lawrence Leritz Day Proclamation, Wood River, Illinois

== See also ==
- List of dancers
- Songs of Youth and Discovery
- Kenn Duncan

== Other sources ==
- Boobs! The Musical Bustin' Out All Over; Cast Album, Regional Runs Expected By Kenneth Jones at Playbill com on Jul 30, 2003
- "Lawrence Leritz Films". New York Times. Archived from the original on May 21, 2011.
