= Peter Quanz =

Canadian choreographer

- Born: August 22, 1979 (age 46); Baden, Ontario, Canada
- Education: Royal Winnipeg Ballet School
- Known for: Ballet
- Notable work: In Tandem

Peter Quanz (born August 22, 1979) is a Canadian choreographer based in Winnipeg, Manitoba.

== Career ==
In 2003 Quanz created SpringScape for the American Ballet Theatre Studio Company. Two years later, in March 2005, Quanz premiered his first full-length ballet, Charlie's Cruise, for Ballett Chemnitz, which drew positive reviews. Later that year, Quanz was the recipient of the Clifford E. Lee Award, for which he created Quantz by Quanz, a piece that was reconceived in 2009 for the Royal Winnipeg Ballet. He also created Kaleidoscope, his first tutu ballet, for the American Ballet Theatre. This piece was reworked for Les Grands Ballets Canadiens in 2008. In 2007 Quanz was the first Canadian choreographer to create a ballet for the Kirov Ballet of the Mariinsky Theatre: Aria Suspended.

In 2009 a group of dancers from the Royal Winnipeg Ballet, working under Quanz's direction, performed his piece In Tandem, a work set to Steve Reich's Pulitzer Prize-winning score Double Sextet. In Tandem was commissioned by the Guggenheim Museum, Works & Process workshop. The success of this piece led Quanz to the form the ensemble Q Dance / Quanz Danse, which was launched in the spring of 2010. Q Dance has performed at a number of dance festivals and since 2013, has been included in the Royal Winnipeg Ballet's seasons.

In 2016, Quanz collaborated with Toronto choreographer Lucy Rupert to create dead reckoning, a three-part dance piece inspired by Ernest Shackleton's Antarctic expedition. That year he was also the choreographer of the dance-drama The Red Crane, a production of the Wuxi Song and Dance Theatre from China, which also features Tristan Dobrowney of the Royal Winnipeg Ballet.
