= Concerto DSCH =

Ballet choreographed by Alexei Ratmansky

- Choreographer: Alexei Ratmansky
- Music: Dmitri Shostakovich
- Premiere: 29 May 2008; New York State Theater
- Original ballet company: New York City Ballet

Concerto DSCH is a ballet by Alexei Ratmansky choreographed for the New York City Ballet to the music of Dmitri Shostakovich's Piano Concerto No. 2 in F Major, Op. 102 (1957). The premiere took place on Thursday, May 29, 2008, at the New York State Theater, Lincoln Center. The ballet's title derives from the composer's use of DSCH, his musical monogram. Wendy Whelan, one of the creators of the ballet, performed the second movement of the ballet at her farewell performance.

== Casts ==
- World premiere (2008): Wendy Whelan, Ashley Bouder, Benjamin Millepied, Joaquín De Luz, Gonzalo Garcia
- Pacific Northwest Ballet premiere (2011): Carla Körbes, Carrie Imler, Karel Cruz, Seth Orza, Bakthurel Bold
- La Scala Theatre Ballet premiere (2012): Svetlana Zakharova, Alessandra Vassallo, Eris Nezha, Antonino Sutera, Federico Fresi
- Mariinsky Ballet premiere (2013): Yekaterina Kondaurova, Nadezhda Batoeva, Andrey Ermakov, Alexander Sergeyev, Vasily Tkachenko

== Videography ==
In light of the impact of the COVID-19 coronavirus pandemic on the performing arts, New York City Ballet released a recording featuring Sara Mearns, Tyler Angle, Ashley Bouder, Gonzalo Garcia and Joaquin De Luz, recorded on October 5, 2018.
