= Carmen (ballet) =

Several ballets have been created based on the 1845 novella by Prosper Mérimée, some of which use music from the 1875 opera of the same name by Georges Bizet. These include:

- Carmen, a 1949 ballet by Roland Petit.
- Carmen Suite, a 1967 ballet by Alberto Alonso to music by Georges Bizet adapted by Russian composer Rodion Shchedrin.
