= Tschaikovsky Pas de Deux =

Ballet by George Balanchine

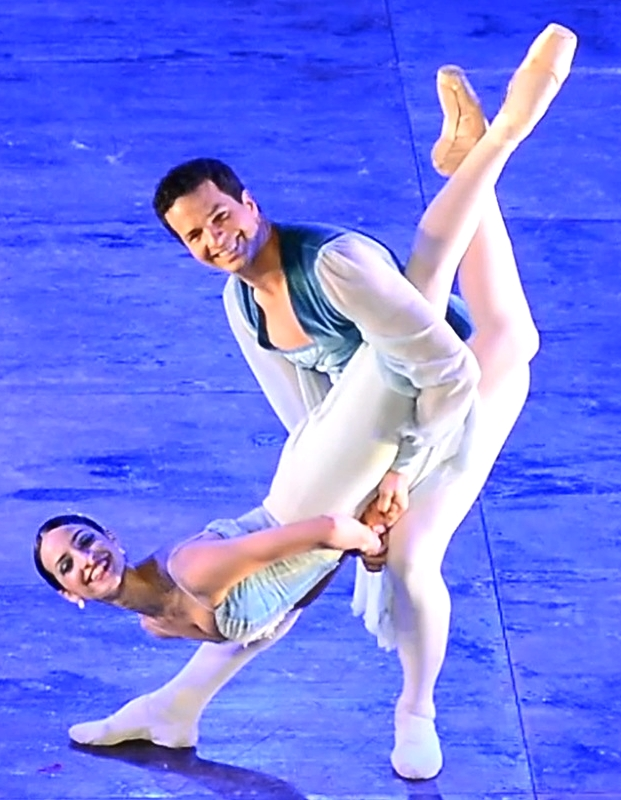
Marize Fumero and Arionel Vargas in Tschaikovsky Pas de Deux at the Ravello Festival in 2016

Tchaikovsky Pas de Deux (Note: At the New York City Ballet, the composer's last name is spelled as "Tschaikovsky" rather than "Tchaikovsky", as the composer used the "Tschaikovsky" spelling during a visit to New York in 1891.) is a ballet choreographed by George Balanchine to a composition by Pyotr Ilyich Tchaikovsky originally intended for act 3 of Swan Lake (Op. 20, 1875–76). With costumes by Barbara Karinska and lighting by Jack Owen Brown, it was first presented by New York City Ballet at the City Center of Music and Drama, New York, on 29 March 1960. Robert Irving conducted the New York City Ballet Orchestra. The dancers were Violette Verdy and Conrad Ludlow.

== Background ==
In 1877, Anna Sobeshchanskaya, prima ballerina of the Bolshoi Theater in Moscow, made her debut in the dual role of Odette/Odile in Swan Lake. After three performances, she was so dissatisfied with the choreography of Julius Reisinger that she asked for new material for the role of Odile in act 3. With permission from the producers, she traveled from Moscow to Saint Petersburg to ask Marius Petipa, ballet master of the Imperial Theaters, to set a pas de deux for Odile and Siegfried to replace the pas de six that functioned as the grand pas in act 3. This he did, using music written by Ludwig Minkus. Upon learning this, Tchaikovsky was angered by the idea of a Minkus composition being inserted into his ballet score, so he composed a new pas de deux for the ballerina, even matching the structure of the Minkus piece so that she would not have to change Petipa's choreography. It was a standard pas de deux classique, with a short entrée, a grand adage, a variation for the danseur, a variation for the ballerina, and a coda. Madame Sobeshchanskaya was, apparently, pleased.

For more than seventy years, this pas de deux was forgotten. Because it was a later composition, it was not published as part of Tchaikovsky's score and was thought to have been lost. Accidentally discovered in 1953 in the archives of the Bolshoi Theater among the orchestral parts for another ballet, it came to the attention of George Balanchine, who successfully sought permission to use it for his own choreography.

== Choreography ==
Described by the New York City Ballet as "an eight-minute display of ballet bravura and technique," Tschaikovsky Pas de Deux opens with an expectant, lyrical entrée, as the dancers discover each other on stage, join hands, and take an opening pose. This leads into a softly romantic grand adage of balances, turns, and lifts that swells to an ardent climax before subsiding to a gentle closing, ending in a famous pose: an exaggerated "fish dive" with the ballerina cradled at her hips between her partner's arms, her hands held in his, her legs neatly crossed at the ankles, and her face very close to the floor. In the original performances by Verdy and Ludlow, she would turn her head at the last count of the music and look quizzically up at him as if to say, "Hello—what am I doing down here?" (Note: Few of Verdy and Ludlow's successors, if any, take this pose, preferring a less difficult position with the ballerina held higher off the floor and with her legs in a cocked-bow-and-arrow position. Almost no ballerina heeds Verdy's instruction to look up at her partner in puzzled amusement, which diminishes the witty effect of the final pose.) The ebullient male variation that follows, which was originally much longer, varies from performer to performer, although the sequence of steps is much the same, featuring big jumps and double tours en l'air. The choreography for the ballerina's variation is, however, rigorously maintained, with a darting attack and flashing footwork expressing the sparkling melodic line. The air-flung coda builds dramatically with the music in high lifts, dazzling turns, and breathtaking leaps, as the ballerina flies across the stage into the waiting arms of her partner. Finally, she is carried offstage, high overhead, with one leg extended in front, her arms and head flung back in rapturous abandon.

The steps for the opening and closing parts of the ballet are much the same as those that Balanchine set at the beginning of his work on the piece, with Diana Adams and Jacques d'Amboise. Other sequences and the variations were devised to suit Verdy and Ludlow as the choreography developed.

== Video discography ==
- 1960s. Violette Verdy: The Artist Teacher at Chautauqua Institution. A documentary, directed by Jean-Pierre Bonnefoux and Patricia McBride. Includes an excerpt from the female variation, danced by Violette Verdy. Released by Video Artists International (VAI) in 2009.
- 1978. Choreography by Balanchine. Includes complete ballet, danced by Patricia McBride and Mikhail Baryshnikov. Released by Nonesuch Records in 2008.
- 1978. Peter Martins: A Dancer. A documentary, includes an excerpt from the male variation, danced by Peter Martins. Released by Kultur Video in 2001.
- 1984. Balanchine. A documentary, includes performances of the male and female variations. Released by Kultur Video in 2004.
- 1984. The Art of the Pas de Deux. Includes complete ballet, danced by Patricia McBride and Reid Olsen. Released by Video Artists International (VAI) in 2006.
- 1989. Dancing for Mr. B.: Six Balanchine Ballerinas. Includes an excerpt, danced by Melissa Hayden and Edward Villella. Released by Kultur Video in 2008.
- 1994. Gala Tribute to Tchaikovsky. Includes complete ballet, danced by Darcey Bussell and Zoltan Solymosi. Released by Kultur Video in 2008.
- 2001. Violette et Mr. B. A documentary, includes grand adage, male and female variations, danced by Margaret Illmann and Vladimir Malakov, coached by Violette Verdy. Released by Le Films du Pricuré, Paris, in 2008. Commentary in English.
- 2003. Tschaikovsky Pas de Deux. Archival video of the complete ballet, danced by Jennie Somogyi and Peter Boal, coached by Violette Verdy and Conrad Ludlow. In The George Balanchine Foundation Interpreters' Archive, available in the Jerome Robbins Dance Division of the New York Public Library for the Performing Arts.
- 2010. Violette Verdy Talks about Creating Roles for Balanchine. Archival video, includes complete ballet, danced by Tiler Peck and Joaquin De Luz, coached by Violette Verdy. A Studio 5 event, directed by Damian Woetzel. Released by New York City Center in 2014. Available on YouTube.
