= The Little Humpbacked Horse (ballet) =

Ballet

The Little Humpbacked Horse, or The Tsar Maiden (a.k.a. Konyok Gorbunok ili Tsar-Devitsa, or Le Petit cheval bossu, ou La Tsar-Demoiselle) is a ballet in four acts and eight scenes with apotheosis.

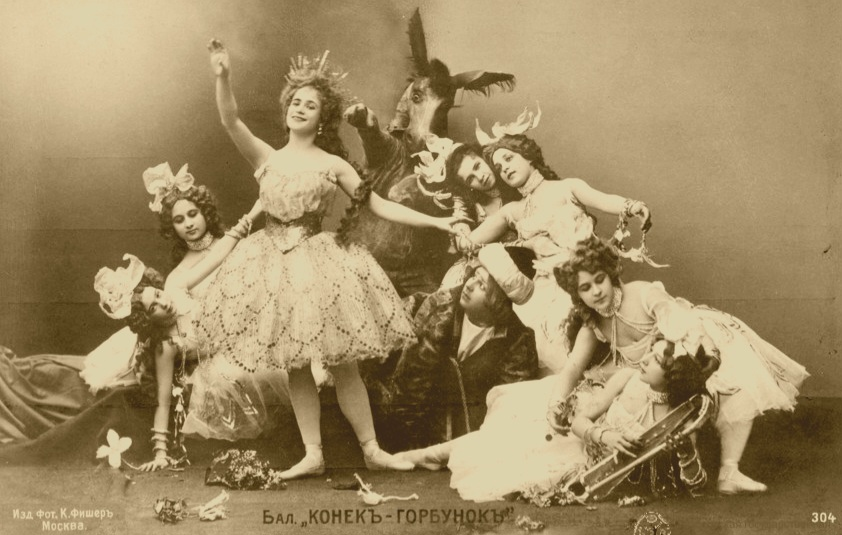
Photo of cast members of the Bolshoi Theatre in Alexander Gorsky's revival of The Little Humpbacked Horse. In the center of the photograph are Lyubov Roslavleva as the Tsar Maiden (front, standing), Vasily Tikhomirov as the Humpbacked Horse (center, back) and Nikolai Domashev as Ivanushka (center, reclining). Moscow, 1901.

== Story of the ballet ==
The libretto is by Arthur Saint-Léon, based on the fairy tale The Little Humpbacked Horse by Pyotr Yershov. However, the choreographer substantially deviated from Yershov's original tale. The ballet shows how Ivan the fool, with the aid of a magical horse, defeats an evil Khan and wins the hand of the Tsar-Maiden. Eventually Ivan replaces the ineffective and incompetent Tsar and becomes Tsar himself.

== Choreography of Saint-Léon ==
The original choreography was created by Arthur Saint-Léon and was set to music by Cesare Pugni.

The ballet was first presented by the Imperial Ballet on 15 December [O.S. 3 December] 1864 at the Imperial Bolshoi Kamenny Theatre in St. Petersburg, Russia. Marfa Muravyova (as the Tsar Maiden) and Timofey Stukolkin (as Ivanushka) were planned as principal performers. However, Stukolkin had broken his leg and was replaced with Nilolay Troitsky, who had no previous experience of dancing principal roles.

The ballet became an important milestone in the development of Russian ballet. It was the first ballet based on a Russian story. Composer Pugni included Russian folk songs in the music for the ballet and choreographer Arthur Saint-Léon created specifically Russian folk dancing – overall 22 Russian folk dances were staged. However, the French choreographer was not very knowledgeable in Russian folk dancing and invented many of them himself, including the "Ural dance". The ballet was very colorful and became a huge success.

Russian democratic critics such as Mikhail Saltykov-Shchedrin and Nikolay Nekrasov however strongly criticized the work. They viewed the ballet as a pathetic parody of Russian dances rather than a genuine collection of dances, and accused the choreographer of being mediocre, the audience of tastelessness, Tsar Alexander II of having a criminal attitude to his people, and all of them together of a lack of understanding of social development.

On the other hand, the ballet enjoyed success with the audience. In its turn, it triggered the creation of a series of Russian-style ballets on the Imperial scene. Simultaneously, the Moscow Imperial troupe developed a different style, combining classical European choreography with real Russian folk dance.

After two years, 13 December [O.S. 1 December] 1866, the ballet was moved to the Moscow Imperial troupe.

In 1876, Sokolov re-staged the choreography of Saint-Léon in Moscow at the Bolshoi Theatre, using genuine Russian dances. This re-staging separated the two ways the ballet was performed - the classical dance in Saint Petersburg and the dance incorporated into the performance in Moscow. This eventually developed into two schools of Russian Ballet, which survived well into the 1930s. Subsequently, the Moscow school ceased to exist when a large number of Saint Petersburg dancers were moved to Moscow in the 1930s.

A hundred years later, in 1960, the Russian composer Rodion Shchedrin created a new ballet on the same subject.

== Revivals, re-stagings and alternate versions ==
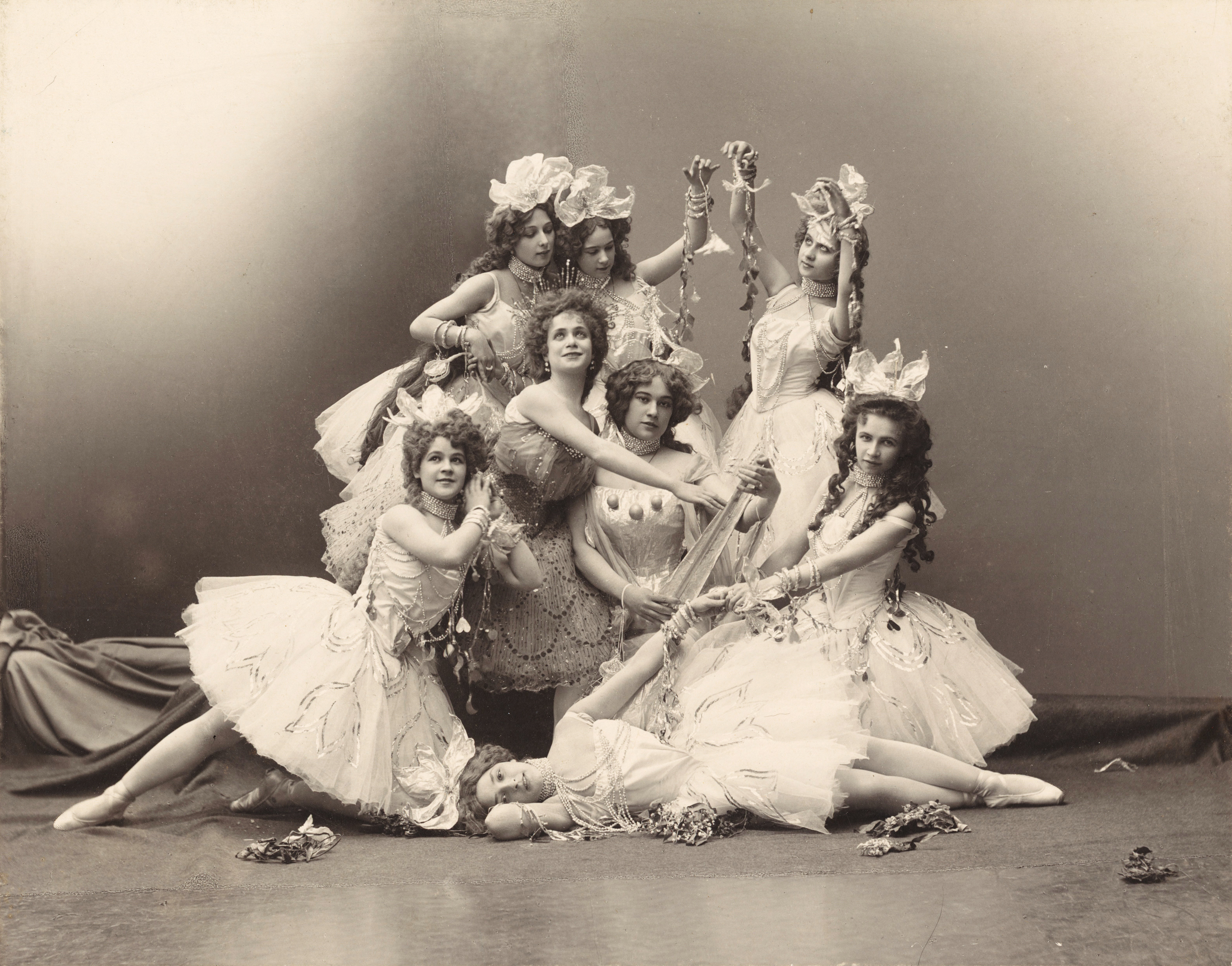
Lyubov Roslavleva (center, left) as the Tsar Maiden with dancers costumed for Alexander Gorsky's revival of The Little Humpbacked Horse for the Bolshoi Theatre. Moscow, 1901.

- Re-staging by Arthur Saint-Léon for the Ballet of the Moscow Imperial Bolshoi Theatre, with Cesare Pugni revising his original score. First presented on November 26, 1866, at the Moscow Imperial Bolshoi Theatre in Moscow, Russia. Principal Dancers - Marfa Muravieva (as the Tsar Maiden) and Timofei Stukolkin (as Ivanushka).
- Revival by José Mendez for the Ballet of the Moscow Imperial Bolshoi Theatre. First presented at the Moscow Imperial Bolshoi Theatre on December 26, 1893, in Moscow, Russia.
- Revival under the title The Tsar Maiden by Marius Petipa for the Imperial Ballet, with musical additions and revisions to Pugni's score by Riccardo Drigo. First presented on December 6–18, 1895 at the Imperial Mariinsky Theatre in St. Petersburg, Russia. Principal Dancers - Pierina Legnani (as the Tsar Maiden), Alexander Shirayev (as Ivanushka) and Felix Kschessinsky (as the Khan).
- Revival by Alexander Gorsky for the Ballet of the Moscow Imperial Bolshoi Theatre, with additional music by Anton Simon, Boris Asafiev, Pyotr Tchaikovsy, Antonín Dvořák, Alexander Glazunov, Brahms and Franz Liszt. First presented at the Moscow Imperial Bolshoi Theatre on November 25, 1901, in Moscow, Russia. Principal Dancers - Lyubov Roslavleva (as the Tsar Maiden) and Alexander Gorsky (as Ivanushka).
- Re-staging by Alexander Gorsky of his 1901 revival for the Imperial Ballet, with musical additions and revisions to Pugni's score by Riccardo Drigo. First presented at the Imperial Mariinsky Theatre on December 16, 1912. Principal Dancers - Tamara Karsavina (as the Tsar Maiden) and Nikolai Legat (as Ivanushka).
- Revival of Gorsky's 1912 production by Feodor Lopukhov for the Kirov Ballet. First presented at the Kirov State Academic Theatre of Opera and Ballet in 1945.
- Alexander Radunsky choreographed his own version to an entirely new score by Rodion Shchedrin for the Bolshoi Ballet, Moscow, in 1960. The choreographer, Igor Belsky utilized Schedrin's score in his staging for the Maly Theatre in Leningrad in 1963. The Radunsky—Shchedrin version was filmed in 1961 with Maya Plisetskaya as the Tsar Maiden and Vladimir Vasiliev as Ivanushka.

== Notes ==
- In an effort to appeal to the tastes of his Imperial Russian audience, Saint-Léon concluded the ballet with a Grand divertissement celebrating all the different nations of Russia, beginning with a Grand cortège to a march by the composer titled The Peoples of Russia. The Grand divertissement included the choreographer's own balletic version of Russian national dance.
- Petipa's 1895 revival included a new prologue and apotheosis, as well as additional variations for the Ballerina Legnani written by Riccardo Drigo.
