= Ravello Festival =

Summer music festival in Ravello, Italy

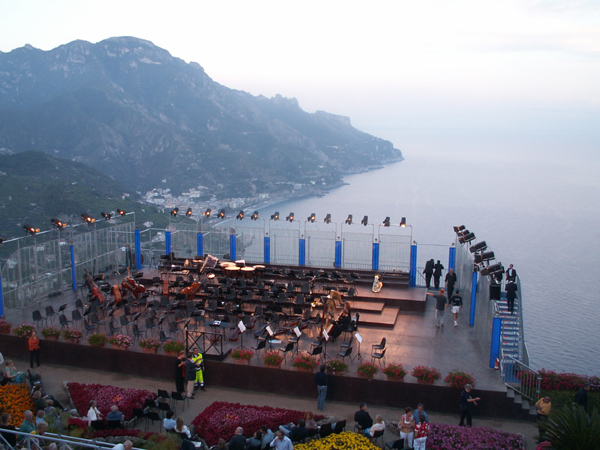
The annual Festival of Ravello is a popular music venue in Italy. Here, an orchestra starts to set up on a stage overlooking the Amalfi coast.

The Ravello Festival is also popularly known as the "Wagner Festival" and is an annual summer festival of music and the arts held in the town of Ravello on the Amalfi coast in the Campania region of Italy. The festival has been held yearly since 1953 when the town fathers decided to use the historical fact of the visit to Ravello in 1880 by German composer Richard Wagner as a way to promote tourism and bolster the economy of the area in the difficult years following the Second World War. The composer had been so taken with the beauty of the Villa Rufolo in Ravello that he is said to have proclaimed, in reference to a character in his own opera Parsifal, "Here is the enchanted garden of Klingsor."

Although the original emphasis during the festival was on Wagner's music, the event has since grown into an almost two-month-long presentation of a wide variety of music featuring large orchestras, chamber groups, jazz, art shows, dance, photographic exhibits, discussion groups and a chance to meet and talk with the featured artists, many of whom are of world renown.
