= Marguerite and Armand =

Ballet by Sir Frederick Ashton

Marguerite and Armand is a ballet danced to an orchestral arrangement of Franz Liszt's B minor piano sonata. It was created in 1963 by the British choreographer Sir Frederick Ashton specifically for Rudolf Nureyev and Margot Fonteyn. The ballet takes its inspiration from the 1848 novel La Dame aux Camélias by Alexandre Dumas, fils, and other adaptations of the same story such as Giuseppe Verdi's 1853 opera La traviata.

== Plot ==
Marguerite Gautier, a Parisian courtesan, lies on her deathbed, gravely ill with tuberculosis. In her delirium she recalls her love affair with a young man named Armand, which the ballet portrays using many dreamlike flashback sequences.

In the first flashback, Marguerite, wearing a red dress, is surrounded by admirers and suitors. She lets them flirt with her, but feels no real emotions. Armand enters and falls for Marguerite immediately, and she returns his feelings. At the end of this sequence, Marguerite tests Armand's love by throwing a white flower to the ground as her wealthy protector leads her away. Another suitor goes to pick up the flower, but when Armand moves to take it, the other man lets him. This symbolizes Marguerite and Armand as a couple.

Marguerite, now increasingly ill, deserts her wealthy protector to live in the countryside with Armand. However, Armand's father asks her to quit her lover; she agrees, but will not tell Armand why she must leave him. A despairing Marguerite is about to leave the country house when Armand enters, and becomes distressed upon seeing her so distraught. A passionate sequence follows, portraying the characters' love, Marguerite's sacrifice and Armand's confusion.

Armand, angered by Marguerite's lack of an explanation, publicly humiliates her by tearing the necklace given to her by her wealthy protector from her neck and throwing it to the floor, and throwing money in her face.

In the final scenes, sad and alone, Marguerite waits for inevitable death. However, Armand's father has revealed the truth to him and Armand makes it back to the apartment to hold Marguerite one last time. She dies in his arms.

== Dancers ==
The ballet was particularly associated with Nureyev and Fonteyn, the original performers. It featured in their farewell performances in Fonteyn & Nureyev on Broadway. Revivals of the ballet have starred pairings such as Sylvie Guillem and Nicolas Le Riche, Zenaida Yanowsky and Roberto Bolle, Alessandra Ferri and Federico Bonelli, and Tamara Rojo and Sergei Polunin. Polunin has also danced the ballet alongside Svetlana Zakharova.

In November 2015, the ballet was performed for the first time by The Sarasota Ballet, which marked the first time an American ballet company had been given permission to perform this iconic Ashton ballet. The piece was performed in a triple bill alongside Kenneth MacMillan's Concerto and Peter Wright's Summertide. The leading roles of Marguerite and Armand were performed by Principals Victoria Hulland and Ricardo Graziano and subsequently during the matinee performance by Danielle Brown and Juan Gil. Hulland and Graziano would become the first American woman and Brazilian man to perform these roles.

== Music ==
From 1963 to 1968 the ballet was danced to an orchestration of Liszt's sonata by Humphrey Searle. In 1968 the Royal Ballet commissioned a new arrangement, by Gordon Jacob.
