= Mariinsky Ballet =

Ballet company in Saint Petersburg, Russia

General information
- Name: Mariinsky Ballet
- Previous names: Imperial Russian Ballet (1860–1920); State Academic Theatre of Opera and Ballet, Leningrad State Academic Theatre of Opera and Ballet (1920/1924–1935); Kirov Ballet (1935–1992)
- Year founded: Approx. 1738; 288 years ago
- Principal venue: Mariinsky Theatre; 1 Theatre Square; St Petersburg; Russia
- Website: www.mariinsky.ru/en

Artistic staff
- Artistic director: Valery Gergiev (Mariinsky Theatre)
- Deputy director: Yury Fateyev; Tatiana Bessarabova (assistant)
- Reserve Troupe Director: Andrei Bugaev

Other
- Parent company: Mariinsky Theatre
- Associated schools: Vaganova Ballet Academy
- Formation: Principal; First Soloist; Second Soloist; Principal Character Artist; Coryphee; Corps de Ballet; Reserve Troup

The Mariinsky Ballet (Russian: Балет Мариинского театра) is the resident classical ballet company of the Mariinsky Theatre in Saint Petersburg, Russia.

Founded in the 18th century and originally known as the Imperial Russian Ballet, the Mariinsky Ballet is one of the world's leading ballet companies. Internationally in some quarters, the Mariinsky Ballet continues to be known by its former Soviet name the Kirov Ballet. The Mariinsky Ballet is the parent company of the Vaganova Ballet Academy, a leading international ballet school.

== History ==
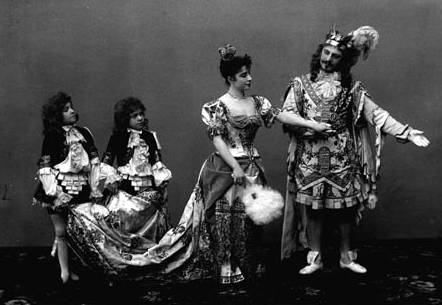
Carlotta Brianza and Pavel Gerdt of the Imperial Ballet as Princess Aurora and Prince Desire in the 1890 premiere of the Sleeping Beauty.

The Mariinsky Ballet was founded in the 1740s, following the formation of the first Russian dance school in 1738.

The Imperial Theatre School, as it was originally known, was established on 4 May 1738, at the Winter Palace in Saint Petersburg. It would become the predecessor of today's Vaganova Academy of Russian Ballet. The school's founder director was the French ballet master and teacher Jean-Baptiste Landé and the purpose of creating the school was to train young dancers to form the first Russian ballet company.

As the Imperial Russian Ballet, the company premiered numerous ballets by choreographer Marius Petipa. A number of his ballets now form the basis of the traditional classical ballet repertoire, performed by ballet companies around the world, and often retaining much of Petipa's choreography. These ballets include the original productions of The Nutcracker, The Sleeping Beauty, Don Quixote, La Bayadère, and Raymonda; and popular revivals of older ballets, including Coppélia, Giselle, and Le Corsaire. Petipa's revival of the ballet Swan Lake is perhaps his most famous work for the company. Originally choreographed by Julius Reisinger for the Bolshoi Theatre in 1877, Swan Lake was initially a critical and commercial failure. Petipa sought to revive the ballet with the blessing of Pyotr Ilyich Tchaikovsky, but the composer died before the new ballet was created. Petipa consequently worked with his brother Modest Tchaikovsky, who significantly revised the story and rewrote the libretto to the version now commonly performed. The production was choreographed by Petipa and his collaborator Lev Ivanov. Premiering at the Mariinsky Theatre in 1895, the Petipa/Ivanov/Tchaikovsky production of Swan Lake was a success.

Kirov Ballet logo used by Victor Hachhauser, promoting the Mariinsky Ballet in London

Following the Russian Revolution, the Soviet government decided that the ballet school and company were unwanted symbols of the tsarist regime and closed them both. The ballet company was the first to be re-established, becoming in 1920 known as the State Academic Theatre of Opera and Ballet, with the school re-opening later as the Leningrad State Choreographic School, both in their previous locations.

After the assassination of prominent Soviet figure Sergey Kirov in 1934, the Ballet was renamed the Kirov Ballet in 1935, a name which is still sometimes incorrectly used. After the end of Communist rule, the ballet company and opera company were renamed for the theatre, becoming in 1992 the Mariinsky Ballet and Mariinsky Opera. Both companies are now run by the theatre itself.

== Today ==
The Director of the Mariinsky Ballet is Andrian Fadeev

== Repertoire ==
- Adagio Hammerklavier
- Anna Karenina-Alexei Ratmansky version
- Apollo
- Ballet Imperial (Ballet No 2)
- Bambi
- La Bayadère
- Bolero Factory
- The Bronze Horseman
- Camera obscura
- Carmen Suite
- Carnaval
- The Cat on the Tree
- Chopiniana
- Choreographic Game 3x3
- Cinderella-Alexei Ratmansky version
- Concerto DSCH
- Le Corsaire
- Le Divertissement du roi
- Don Quixote
- Elegy. Ophelia
- The Firebird
- Fountain of Bakhchisarai
- The Four Seasons
- Giselle
- Infra
- In the Middle, Somewhat Elevated
- In the Night
- In the Jungle
- Inside the Lines
- Jewels
- The Legend of Love-choreography Yury Grigorovich
- Leningrad Symphony
- The Little Humpbacked Horse-Alexei Ratmansky version
- Marguerite and Armand
- A Midsummer Night's Dream
- Les noces
- The Nutcracker-Marius Petipa version
- The Nutcracker-Mihail Chemiakin version
- Paquita-Yuri Smekalov version
- Paquita Grand Pas
- Pavlovsk
- Le Parc
- Petrouchka
- Petrouchka-Vladimir Varnava and Konstantin Fyodorov version
- Polovtsian Dances (ballet)
- The Prodigal Son
- Raymonda
- Le Réveil de Flore
- Romeo and Juliet-Leonid Lavrovsky version
- Russian Overture
- Le Sacre Du Primtemps
- Sacre
- Scheherazade
- Scotch Symphony
- Second I
- Serenade
- Shurale
- Solo
- Sleeping Beauty-Konstantin Sergeev version
- Sleeping Beauty-Sergei Vikharev version
- Spartacus-Leonid Yakobson version
- Le Spectre de la rose
- The Stone Flower
- The Swan
- Swan Lake
- La Sylphide
- Sylvia
- Symphony in C
- Symphony in Three Movements
- Tarantella
- Tchaikovsky Pas de deux
- The Vertiginous Thrill of Exactitude
- Variations for two couples
- Violin Concerto No. 2
- Without
- Yaroslavna. The Eclipse
- The Young Lady and the Hooligan
- 5 Tangos

== Dancers ==
The basis of the Mariinsky Ballet consists of the following artists:

=== Principals ===
- Nadezhda Batoeva
- Ekaterina Kondaurova
- Olesya Novikova
- Renata Shakirova
- Oksana Skorik
- Viktoria Tereshkina
- Diana Vishneva
- Maria Ilyushkina
- Timur Askerov
- Yevgeny Ivanchenko
- Kimin Kim
- Vladimir Shklyarov
- Andrey Ermakov

=== First Soloists ===
- Alexandra Khiteyeva
- Maria Khoreva
- Anastasia Kolegova
- May Nagahisa
- Yekaterina Osmolkina
- Kristina Shapran
- Maria Shirinkina
- Elena Evseeva
- Elena Svinko
- Roman Belyakov
- Even Capitaine
- Yevgeny Konovalov
- Nikita Korneyev
- Alexander Sergeev
- Philipp Stepin
- Konstantin Zverev

=== Second Soloists ===
- Vlada Borodulina
- Maria Bulanova
- Alexandra Iosifidi
- Daria Kulikova
- Anastasia Lukina
- Valeria Martynyuk
- Camilla Mazzi
- Anastasia Nuikina
- Yana Selina
- Tatiana Tkachenko
- Yuri Smekalov
- Ruslan Stenyushkin
- Alexei Timofeyev
- David Zaleyev
- Maxim Zyuzin

=== Character Soloists ===
- Elena Bazhenova
- Olga Belik
- Alisa Rusina
- Islom Baimuradov
- Soslan Kulaev
- Dmitry Pykhachov
- Vasily Shcherbakov
- Andrei Yakovlev

=== Coryphées ===
- Yesenia Anushenkova
- Yuliana Chereshkevich
- Maria Chernyavskaya
- Tamara Gimadieva
- Shamala Guseinova
- Daria Ionova
- Yekaterina Ivannikova
- Viktoria Krasnokutskaya
- Valeria Kuznetsova
- Bíborka Lendvai
- Anastasia Nikitina
- Zlata Yalinich
- Yaroslav Baibordin
- Ramanbek Beishenaliev
- Maxim Izmestiev
- Kian James Manghise
- Roman Malyshev
- Pavel Mikheyev
- Alexei Nedviga
- Aaron Osawa-Horowitz
- Grigory Popov
- Yaroslav Pushkov
- Andrei Solovyov

== Notable dancers ==
- Altynai Asylmuratova
- Mikhail Baryshnikov
- Vakhtang Chabukiani
- Petra Conti
- Natalia Dudinskaya
- Pavel Gerdt
- Tamara Karsavina
- Maria Khoreva
- Irina Kolpakova
- Theodore Kosloff
- Mathilde Kschessinska
- Ninel Kurgapkina
- Pierina Legnani
- Larissa Lezhnina
- Ulyana Lopatkina
- Lisa Macuja
- Askold Makarov
- Natalia Makarova
- Varvara P. Mey
- Galina Mezentseva
- Vaslav Nijinsky
- Rudolf Nureyev
- Alla Osipenko
- Anna Pavlova
- Olga Preobrajenska
- Farukh Ruzimatov
- Leonid Sarafanov
- Marina Semyonova
- Konstantin Sergeyev
- Alla Sizova
- Yuri Soloviev
- Olga Spessivtzeva
- Galina Ulanova
- Diana Vishneva
- Svetlana Zakharova
- Igor Zelensky

== See also ==
- List of productions of Swan Lake derived from its 1895 revival
- Bolshoi Ballet
