= Schertzer =

Schertzer is a surname. Notable people with the surname include:

- Hymie Shertzer (also spelled Schertzer; 1909–1977), American jazz saxophonist
- Mike Schertzer (born 1965), Canadian artist and poet
- Robert M. Schertzer (born 1962), Canadian ophthalmologist

== See also ==
- Scherzer
- Shertzer
