= List of 1890s ballet premieres =

This is a list of ballet premieres in the 1890s, by year.

== 1890 ==
title	choreographer	composer	company	venue
Nénuphar	Marius Petipa	Nikolaï Krotkov	Imperial Ballet	Imperial Mariinsky Theatre
The Sleeping Beauty	Marius Petipa	Tchaikovsky	Imperial Ballet	Imperial Mariinsky Theatre

== 1891 ==
title	choreographer	composer	company	venue
A Fairy Tale	Marius Petipa	Richter	Imperial Ballet School	Imperial Ballet School

== 1892 ==
title	choreographer	composer	company	venue
Mlada	Lev Ivanov, Enrico Cecchetti	Rimsky-Korsakov		St. Petersburg
The Nutcracker	Marius Petipa	Tchaikovsky	Imperial Ballet	Imperial Mariinsky Theatre

== 1893 ==
title	choreographer	composer	company	venue
Cinderella	Marius Petipa	Ludwig Minkus	Imperial Russian Ballet	Imperial Mariinsky Theatre
Kalkabrino	Marius Petipa	Pyotr Schenk	Imperial Ballet	Imperial Mariinsky Theatre

== 1894 ==
title	choreographer	composer	company	venue
Le Réveil de Flore	Marius Petipa	Riccardo Drigo	Imperial Ballet	Peterhof Palace

== 1895 ==
title	choreographer	composer	company	venue
Danse des petits cygnes	Lev Ivanov	Pyotr Ilyich Tchaikovsky	Imperial Ballet	Imperial Mariinsky Theatre
Swan Lake 1895 revival	Marius Petipa and Lev Ivanov	Pyotr Ilyich Tchaikovsky	Imperial Ballet	Imperial Mariinsky Theatre

== 1896 ==
title	choreographer	composer	company	venue
Bluebeard	Marius Petipa	Pyotr Schenk	Imperial Ballet	Imperial Mariinsky Theatre
Javotte		Saint-Saëns		Grand Theater, Lyon

== 1897 ==
title	choreographer	composer	company	venue
Victoria and Merrie England	Carlo Coppi	Arthur Sullivan		Alhambra Theatre

== 1898 ==
title	choreographer	composer	company	venue
La Perle	Marius Petipa	Riccardo Drigo	Imperial Ballet	Imperial Mariinsky Theatre
Raymonda	Marius Petipa	Alexander Glazunov	Imperial Ballet	Imperial Mariinsky Theatre

== 1899 ==
title	choreographer	composer	company	venue
Le Cygne	Mariquita (dancer)	Charles Lecocq		Opéra-Comique
