= Scherzer =

Scherzer is a surname. Notable people with the surname include:

- Ernst Scherzer, German writer, pseudonym of Christian August Gottlob Eberhard (1769–1845)
- Julius Scherzer (born 1928), Romanian chemist
- Karl von Scherzer (1821–1903), Austrian explorer
- Max Scherzer (born 1984), American baseball pitcher
- Otto Scherzer (1909–1982), German theoretical physicist
- Steffi Scherzer (born 1957), German ballet dancer
- William Donald Scherzer (1858–1893), American engineer, "Scherzer" system of Bascule bridges

== See also ==
- Alex Sherzer (1971–2022), American chess grandmaster and medical doctor
- Joel Sherzer (1942–2022), American anthropological linguist and academic
