= Swan Lake (1895) =

1895 Petipa/Ivanov/Drigo revival of Tchaikovsky's ballet

The 1895 Petipa/Ivanov/Drigo revival of Swan Lake is a famous version of the ballet Swan Lake, (ru. Лебединое Озеро), (fr. Le Lac des Cygnes). This is a ballet by Pyotr Ilyich Tchaikovsky based on an ancient German legend, presented in either four acts, four scenes (primarily outside Russia and Eastern Europe), three acts, four scenes (primarily in Russia and Eastern Europe) or, more rarely, in two acts, four scenes. Originally choreographed by Julius Reisinger to the music of Pyotr Ilyich Tchaikovsky (opus 20), it was first presented as The Lake of the Swans by the Ballet of the Moscow Imperial Bolshoi Theatre on 20 February/4 March 1877 (Julian/Gregorian calendar dates) in Moscow, Russia. Although the ballet is presented in many different versions, most ballet companies today base their stagings both choreographically and musically on this revival by Marius Petipa and Lev Ivanov, staged for the Imperial Ballet, first presented on 15 January/27 January 1895, at the Imperial Mariinsky Theatre in St. Petersburg, Russia instead of the original version.

== Background ==
In the 1880s Tchaikovsky was commissioned by Ivan Vsevolozhsky, director of the St. Petersburg Imperial Theatres, to score what would become two of his greatest works: the operas The Enchantress (1886) and The Queen of Spades (1890). In 1887 Vsevolozhsky commissioned Tchaikovsky to score music for Marius Petipa's The Sleeping Beauty, a ballet which would prove to be one of both Tchaikovsky and Petipa's greatest masterworks. The first performance on 15 January 1890 by the Imperial Ballet was a great success and soon Vsevolozhsky commissioned a second score for a ballet and an opera from the composer, The Nutcracker and Iolanta, which premiered together on a double bill on 6 December 1892.

Prior to commissioning The Sleeping Beauty, Vsevolozhsky had considered reviving one act of Swan Lake for the 1886–1887 season and had even written a letter requesting the music from Tchaikovsky's publisher Jurgenson, who recommended that the fourth scene be staged. However, Tchaikovsky suggested that the second scene be staged instead, which he considered to be " ... the best in all respects." Though this production never materialized, Vsevolozhsky continued showing interest in Swan Lake, and even as The Nutcracker was being readied for production in 1892 he was designing costumes for a possible revival of the work that would be produced by Petipa (Vsevolozhsky was a talented costume designer, having designed the costumes for the first productions of both The Sleeping Beauty and The Nutcracker, as well as Raymonda, among many other ballets).

Tchaikovsky was delighted at the prospect of Swan Lake being revived by Petipa, of whom he had the greatest respect, asserting that "never with anyone but Petipa would I produce ballets." According to the composer/conductor Riccardo Drigo, "While (Tchaikovsky) was still alive I knew of his dissatisfaction with the instrumentation of (Swan Lake), and that he intended to take up the matter, but he never managed to do this." Tchaikovsky died on 6 November 1893, just when plans to revive Swan Lake were beginning to come to fruition.

Even with this statement from Drigo (which is from his memoirs written some thirty years after Tchaikovsky's death), it is not known for certain if Tchaikovsky was even going to revise the music for the prospected revival of Swan Lake. At some point before his death, Tchaikovsky approved of three numbers orchestrated by Drigo from his Op. 72 (18 Pieces, for piano) for interpolation into the production (i.e. the Variation of Odile from the third scene and, for the fourth scene, the so-called Waltz for White and Black Swans and the Scène Dansante/Pas d'action). According to Tchaikovsky's brother Modeste, "...he [Tchaikovsky] was so delighted with Maestro Drigo's score for Petipa's The Talisman that he was not opposed to the idea of having him perform some of the necessary revisions [to Swan Lake]...". Whatever the case, as a result of Tchaikovsky's death, Drigo was forced to revise the score himself, but not before receiving approval from Modest.

Vsevolozhsky then planned a memorial concert to be given by the Imperial Ballet and Opera at the Mariinsky Theatre in honor of the composer, with the bill consisting of the first act of Tchaikovsky's opera The Maid of Orleans, his Romeo and Juliet overture, the Coronation Cantana, and the second scene of Swan Lake. The concert was given twice, on 17 and 22 February 1894, with the Swan Lake excerpt being presented in a staging by Lev Ivanov, Second Balletmaster to the Imperial Ballet. Ivanov's choreography for the memorial concert was unanimously hailed as wonderful and though the concert itself was not a success (due to high ticket prices the turnout was poor), Ivanov nevertheless won laurels for his work. The critic Bezobrazov complemented Ivanov: "The staging of the dances in Swan Lake is the work of the Balletmaster Lev Ivanov and does him great honor. Mr. Ivanov revealed a great deal of the finest, most elegant taste. To all the dances the Balletmaster imparted a noble stamp and consistent style."

The ballerina who danced Odette was the Italian virtuosa Pierina Legnani, considered by the critics, public, and her fellow dancers alike to be among the greatest, if not the greatest ballerina to ever grace the Imperial stage. She had made her début with the Imperial Ballet in Cinderella (choreographed by Petipa, Ivanov, and Enrico Cecchetti to the music of Baron Boris Fitinhof-Schell) in December 1893, and when she took to the stage she immediately swept all before her. In the Grand Pas d'action of the ballet's second act she demonstrated her phenomenal technique - next to her flawless placement and perfection of port de bras she performed pique turns with quadruple and quintuple pirouettes en pointe, accented with double turns no less than four times in a row - a feat even modern-day ballerinas have difficulty achieving. In the Grand Pas of the last act Legnani completely out-did herself - in her variation she completed no less than thirty-two fouettés en tournant, the first ballerina ever to perform such a feat. The dazzled public roared with demands for an encore, and the ballerina repeated her variation, this time performing twenty-eight fouettés en tournant. According to press accounts of the production the ballerina "did not move at all from the place she started."

Soon after Legnani was named Prima Ballerina Assoluta of the Imperial Ballet, and it was because of her great talent that the prospected revival of Swan Lake was planned for her benefit performance in the 1894–1895 season. However, the death of Tsar Alexander III on 1 November 1894 and the period of official mourning which followed it brought all ballet performances and rehearsals to a close for some time, and as a result, all efforts were able to be concentrated on the pre-production of the revival of Swan Lake. Ivanov and Petipa chose to collaborate on the production, with Ivanov retaining his dances for the second scene while choreographing the fourth, and with Petipa staging the first and third scenes. Ivanov was also entrusted with staging the Neapolitan Dance and the Hungarian Dance in the Grand Divertessment of the third scene.

Tchaikovsky's brother Modest was called upon to make the required changes to the ballet's libretto, the most prominent being his revision of the ballet's finale: instead of the lovers simply drowning at the hand of the wicked Rothbart as in the original 1877 scenario, Odette commits suicide by drowning herself, with Prince Siegfried choosing to die as well, rather than live without her, and soon the lovers' spirits are reunited in an apotheosis. Aside from the revision of the libretto the ballet was changed from four acts to three - with Act II becoming Act I-Scene 2, Act III becoming Act II, and Act IV becoming Act III.

All was ready by the beginning of 1895 and the ballet had its premiere on 15 January. Pierina Legnani danced Odette/Odile, with Pavel Gerdt as Prince Siegfried, Alexei Bulgakov as Von Rothbart, and Alexander Oblakov as Benno.

== Notation of Swan Lake and the 1895 première ==
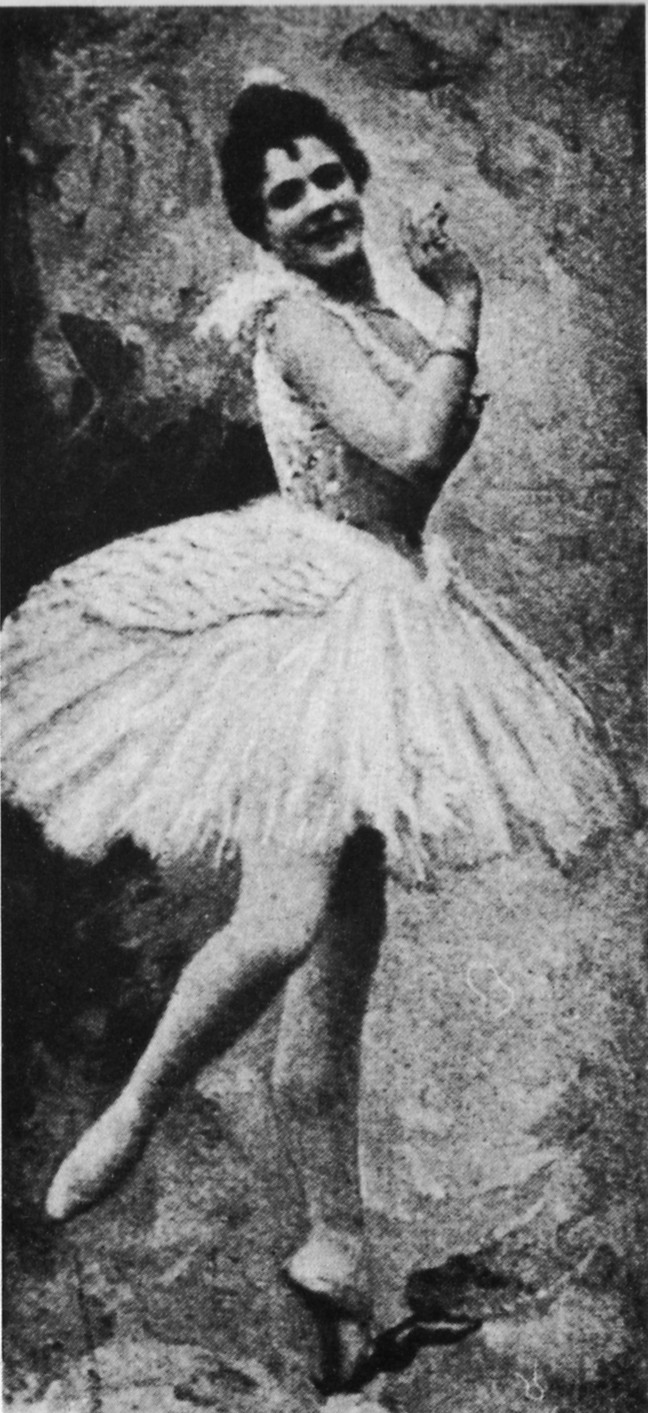
Pierina Legnani as 'Odette'

The 1895 Petipa/Ivanov/Drigo edition of Swan Lake was notated in the method of Stepanov Choreographic Notation in or around 1901, and completed between April 1906 and April 1907, documenting a performance of the work with the Ballerina Vera Trefilova as Odette/Odile. This choreographic notation is today housed in the Harvard University Library Theatre Collection and is part of a whole cache of notation known as the Sergeyev Collection, which documents the works of Marius Petipa that comprised the repertory of the Imperial Ballet at the turn of the 20th century. Here are descriptions of some of the scenes and dances of his and Ivanov's 1895 edition of Swan Lake.

=== Act I (or Act I-Scene 1) ===
Petipa's famous pas de trois from the first scene is still danced today by most companies nearly unchanged, as Petipa usually did when staging a pas de trois classique, having the ballerina who dances the first variation leaving the stage before the end of the Entrée (as in Petipa's Grand Pas de Trois des Odalisques from Le Corsaire, or his Pas de Trois from Paquita). The first dancers to perform the pas de trois in the 1895 revival were Olga Preobrajenskaya, Georgy Kyaksht (famous for creating the role of Harlequin in Petipa's original 1900 Harlequinade), and Varvara Rykhlyakova. According to a press account: "...a captivating Pas de Trois, which is technically difficult, is performed en pointe for the most part with multiple turns, and was excellently performed by the Danseuses and their partner."

The Waltz of the first scene or the Valse Champêtre (or the Valse Villageoise) is danced in many different versions by ballet companies today. Perhaps the only company to dance this Waltz today in Petipa's original version is the Royal Ballet. The notation documents Petipa's original choreography - one of his signature lavish dances for a massive corps de ballet. According to the notation the choreography called for forty dancers (20 men and 20 women), with sixteen of them using footstools painted both red and green to form geometric patterns and make various poses, with the corps de ballet at all times remaining inside the space made by the footstools. A Maypole was brought out toward the finale of the Waltz. One critic who saw the first performance described it: "At the end of the Waltz a (Maypole) is introduced, the high point of which ribbons are dropped in sequential order: red ribbons, blue, and yellow. The dancers pick up the ends of the ribbons, forming thereby a kind of umbrella; it turned out to be quite an effective picture."

=== Act II (or Act I-Scene 2) ===
Perhaps only the Royal Ballet's 1987 revival of Swan Lake (staged by Anthony Dowell and Roland John Wiley) retains Ivanov's original scheme for the second scene, while most other productions present a version which has been handed down primarily by way of Soviet-era revisions. In the 1895 production, Prince Siegfried made his way to the enchanted lake with a group of hunters, not by himself as in many modern versions. When he first encountered Odette, there was (as is preserved in the notation) an extensive mime sequence between the two characters, a passage which is rarely performed in modern times (American Ballet Theatre director Kevin McKenzie created a mime sequence in the same manner as the original for his recent production of Swan Lake, while the Royal Ballet still performs a rendition of Ivanov's original mime).

A most interesting feature of Ivanov's original choreography for the second scene was the use of children, a feature that was only recently restored in the Royal Ballet's 1987 production - there is perhaps no other production in the world which uses children in this scene. In Ivanov's original choreography, when Odette makes her second entrance to beg Benno and the hunting party not to hurt her fellow Swan Maidens, she is followed onstage by eight girl students as Swans. These students also participate in the Waltz of the Swans, which was far more elaborate in Ivanov's original than the traditional version danced today by most companies.

The Grand Adagio of the second scene (the Pas de Deux of Odette and Prince Siegfried sometimes referred to as the Love Duet) was choreographed by Ivanov as a Pas de deux à Trois - Pierina Legnani was partnered by both Pavel Gerdt (who danced Prince Siegfried) and Alexander Oblakov (who danced Benno). It was not until the Danseur Nikolai Legat replaced Gerdt in the role of Prince Siegfried in the late 1890s that the pas became a pas de deux. Following Legat's example, many of the danseurs of the Imperial Ballet who performed Prince Siegfried after he chose to partner Odette alone. In spite of this, the notation for Swan Lake, made between April 1906 and April 1907, documents Ivanov's original 1895 scheme. The first production outside of Russia of the full-length Petipa/Ivanov production of Swan Lake was staged by Nicholas Sergeyev for the Vic-Wells Ballet (today the Royal Ballet) in 1934, a production which retained Ivanov's original version of the Grand Adagio as a Pas de deux à Trois, but over time the company chose to dance it as a pas de deux, which is today the tradition. One critic who viewed the 1895 premiere wrote of this pas: "Legnani was as if transformed, preening and admiring her snow-white down, it was as if Legnani were actually experiencing these moments, filled with poetic melancholy. Langour showed in each of her graceful movements. There Legnani was at the height of understanding her art."

The famous Dance of the Little Swans is the only number of the original 1895 Swan Lake to be danced in modern times exactly as Ivanov choreographed it. The remainder of the second scene is notated but the finale is not.

=== Act III (or Act II) ===
The National dances are rarely if ever, performed as Petipa and Ivanov first staged them (Petipa staged the Spanish Dance and the Mazurka, Ivanov staged the Neapolitan Dance and the Hungarian Dance). During the premiere of the 1895 revival the Spanish Dance and the Neapolitan Dance left a rather neutral impression, but the Hungarian Dance and Mazurka were both encored. The Hungarian Dance was performed by the Danseur Alfred Bekefi and Petipa's daughter Marie Petipa (famous for creating the role of the Lilac Fairy in The Sleeping Beauty), who wore 12,000 roubles worth of diamonds for the performance. Perhaps the biggest sensation was the Mazurka, danced by a group of dancers with Felix Kschessinsky as soloist. Kschessinsky (the father of the Ballerina Mathilde Kschessinskaya) was hailed in his day at the Mariinsky Theatre as "King of the Mazurka." The national dances are all preserved in Petipa and Ivanov's original choreography with the exception of the Spanish Dance, which is only preserved in Alexander Gorsky's 1913 version.

The character of Odile was not a "Black Swan" at all in either the original production of 1877 nor in the revival of 1895, and she was not performed as such for many years - she was simply Rothbart's evil daughter until sometime in the late 1930s or early 1940s. As Odile, Pierina Legnani appeared in a glittering multi-colored costume with no feathers to be found - obviously to appear more as an enchantress than as a "Black Swan." Later performances at the Mariinsky Theatre of Swan Lake used similar costume designs for Odile throughout the late 19th century and early 20th century. It is unknown when the tradition of having Odile performed as a "Black Swan" began, but most historians point to a 1941 staging of the third scene (the "Ballroom Scene") performed by the Ballet Russe de Monte Carlo at the Metropolitan Opera in New York. This production was staged by Alexandra Fedorova-Fokine under the title The Magic Swan. Odile was danced by the great Ballerina Tamara Toumanova. At the time the only part of Swan Lake that was known in the west was the famous second scene (or the "White Act" as it is sometimes called). In an effort to have the audience distinguish Odile from the more well-known Odette, Fedorova-Fokine had Toumanova perform in a black costume, and almost by accident Odile began to be referred to as "The Black Swan." Though Toumanova was not the first ballerina to wear such a costume when dancing Odile, her 1941 performance set the tradition in motion and soon Odile became "The Black Swan," a tradition that quickly spread everywhere, including Russia.

What became known in modern times as The Black Swan Pas de Deux, which ends with glittering virtuosity from the ballerina as well as the danseur, was originally staged by Petipa as a Grand Pas de Deux à Quatre demi d'action - Prince Siegfried (Pavel Gerdt) and an additional suitor (danced by Alexander Gorsky) partnered Odile (Pierina Legnani), while Rothbart (danced by Alexei Bulgakov) did most of the acting/mime. In order to share in the "labour" of partnering, it was a tradition in the late 19th century Imperial Theatres to have an additional suitor, along with the lead cavalier, partner the Prima Ballerina in a ballet's Grand Adagio. This was mostly because the aging Pavel Gerdt (who was fifty years old in 1895) was performing nearly all of the lead male roles in the repertory.

After the Grand Adagio Pavel Gerdt did not dance a variation, but the additional cavalier, danced by Alexander Gorsky, did - though a rather short one according to contemporary accounts. Just as it was a tradition in the Imperial Ballet that an additional suitor partner the Ballerina, it was also tradition that this additional suitor dance the lead male character's variation, being that the aging Pavel Gerdt could not. It is not known for certain what music was used for Gorsky's variation, though it is thought to have been either a version of what later became the traditional Variation of Prince Siegfried, or an interpolation from another work, though this is highly unlikely. Gorsky would later expand on this solo for his own staging of the Petipa/Ivanov Swan Lake at the Moscow Bolshoi Theatre in 1901, for which he danced the lead. Prince Siegfried's famous variation has been historically credited to the great Danseur of the Kirov/Mariinsky Ballet Vakhtang Chabukiani, who it has been said was the first to dance the solo in the 1930s at the Kirov, though most likely he had learned the variation from Gorsky. Today the Kirov/Mariinsky Ballet's score for Swan Lake has this variation titled with a rubric that says Variation of Chabukiani, and this same solo is used by nearly every company when they perform The Black Swan Pas de Deux, though there are often differences in the music regarding orchestration from production to production (for example, the Kirov/Mariinsky Ballet's version of this music is orchestrated for solo clarinet at the start, whereas in the west it is usually the full violin section that plays throughout).

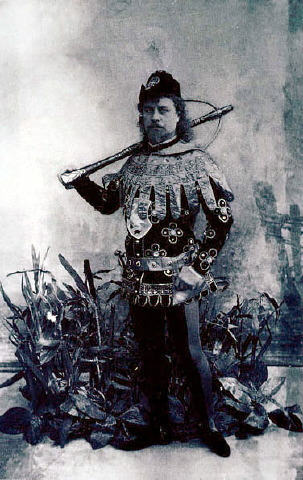
Pavel Gerdt as Prince Siegfried in the Petipa/Ivanov revival ofSwan Lake, St. Petersburg, 1895

Pierina Legnani's variation as Odile was crafted by Petipa for her virtuoso technique and is for the most part still performed as originally choreographed by him, still challenging ballerinas to the present day. The Coda which followed Odile's variation was, as is well known, one the sensations of the 1895 premiere, with Legnani performing her famous thirty-two fouettés en tournant. The tradition of the famous 32 fouettés en tournant has spilled over into other famous 19th century Grand Pas, among them, the Le Corsaire Pas de Deux, Don Quxiote Grand Pas de Deux, and the Paquita Grand Pas Classique, among others.

=== Act IV (or Act III) ===
At the beginning of the fourth scene, after a brief interlude, the second of the additions to the ballet was danced - another Waltz of the Swans to Drigo's orchestration of a piece from Tchaikovsky's Op. 72 - No. 11 Valse Bluette. This Waltz is still retained by many companies, particularly the Kirov/Mariinsky Ballet and the Royal Ballet. Ivanov choreographed this Waltz, based on Petipa's sketches, for both white and black Swans. After the Waltz is over Odette made her frantic entrance and, (as preserved in the notation), a brief mime interlude followed between her and a few of her Swan maidens.

After Prince Siegfried made his entrance, the third of the additions to the ballet was a Pas d'action for his reconciliation with Odette. This number was also orchestrated by Drigo from Tchaikovsky's Op. 72 - No. 15 Un poco di Chopin, a piece which is not danced by very many companies today, except for the Royal Ballet and the Kirov/Mariinsky Ballet. After Rothbart makes his entrance a brief interlude ensues, but soon the choreographic notation comes to an end.

The premiere of the Petipa/Ivanov/Drigo was quite a success, with Legnani enchanting the audience with her versatile portrayal of the Swan Queen Odette and the evil enchantress Odile, but the 1895 version was still not the colossal triumph that has been accepted as fact in modern times. Most of the reviews in the St. Petersburg newspapers were positive.

The Tableau of Swan Lake in the second scene was planned with great talent and permeated with true poetry, gloomy and expressive. Among the craggy rocks in the far distance, a mysterious and deathly quiet lake is seen. The entire stage is filled with soft, quivering moonlight ... To melodious sounds, lightly and beautifully, like the music, a flock of swans, floats out...the 'Waltz of the Swans' is simple and beautiful. The Adagio is the Ballerina's masterpiece, in the performance of which Miss Legnani revealed brilliant technique, lightness of movement, and plasticity of the pose.

Unlike the premiere of The Sleeping Beauty, Swan Lake did not dominate the repertory of the Mariinsky Theatre in its first season. It was given only sixteen performances in the 1895–1896 season and was not performed at all in 1897. Even more surprising, the ballet was only given four times in 1898 and 1899. The ballet belonged solely to Legnani until she left St. Petersburg for her native Italy in 1901. After her departure, the ballet was taken over by Mathilde Kschessinskaya, who was as much celebrated in the role as was her Italian predecessor.

== Drigo's edition of Tchaikovsky's score ==
There are major differences in the score of Swan Lake when one compares a recording or manuscript of the original, un-altered composition of 1877, with the score as performed in live performance. Although he is rarely credited for his work, it is Riccardo Drigo's revision of Tchaikovsky's score as done for Petipa and Ivanov's 1895 revival that almost every ballet company utilizes to one degree or another when performing Swan Lake. Most ballet companies opt to fashion their own respective version of Tchaikovsky's score. Nevertheless, Drigo's revision of the score is often used as the foundation. It is significant to note that Tchaikovsky's brother Modest approved of Drigo revising the music, and Tchaikovsky himself approved of the additions.

=== Structure ===
Below is a list of the most striking changes made by Drigo to the score of Swan Lake, many of which have remained the standard of ballet companies today.

NOTE Some numbering of the Acts and Scenes were changed for the 1895 revival - Act II became Act I-scene 2, thus changing Act III to Act II, and Act IV to Act III.

Act I (or Act I-Scene 1)

- the Andante sostenuto (No. 4-2 in the original score) of the Pas de Trois (No. 4) was deleted.
- the first variation of the Pas de Trois (No. 4-3 in the original score) was changed from Allegro semplice to Allegro moderato. The eight bars of music preceding the final eight bars of the variation were deleted. Two bars of music before the final two bars were deleted as well. Percussion (including fortissimo cymbals, snare drum, and triangle) was removed from the final bars.
- the second variation of the Pas de Trois (No. 4-4) was shortened (repeated passages removed). As well, the final eight bars of music was changed from poco meno to meno.
- the third variation of the Pas de Trois (No. 4-5) was also shortened (repeated passages removed), and changed from Allegro to Allegretto.
- the Waltz (No. 2) and the Pas de Trois (No. 4) were reversed. The Waltz was retitled Valse Champêtre (Pastoral Waltz). It is also known as the Valse Villageoise. Various repeated passages were removed from the waltz.
- the Pas de Deux for Two Merry Makers (No. 5) was transferred to Act III (known today as the Black Swan Pas de deux) and extensively revised.

Act II (or Act I-Scene 2)

- the dances of the Grand Pas des Cygnes (or the Dances of the Swans) were put into a new order, with Tchaikovsky's reprise of the Waltz of the Swans (Tempo di valse-No. 13-3) being deleted. The new order was - the Waltz of the Swans (Tempo di valse-No. 13-1), the Grand Adagio AKA the Love Duet (Pas d'action-No. 13-5), the Dance of the Little Swans (Allegro moderato-No. 13-4), the General Dance (Tempo di valse-No. 13-6), Variation of Odette (Moderato assai-Molto più mosso No. 13-2), and the Grand Coda (Coda-Allegro vivo No. 13-7). This order of the dances is retained by almost every ballet company today.
- the ending of the Grand Adagio or Love Duet (Pas d'action-No. 13-5) was modified by Drigo. Originally this number ended with an Allegro movement in Eb major. This ending was omitted and in its place, Drigo added an epilogue at bar 95 which was composed by himself. The new ending corresponded with the motif of the rest of the number, while also reverting to the opening key. This is the version that is used by nearly every ballet company today.
- the Coda (No. 13-7) (retitled Coda Générale) was lengthened by having the number repeat before the finale.

Act III (or Act II)

- the Ballabile: Dances for the Corps de ballet and the Dwarfs (No. 16) was deleted (this music was later used by the Balletmaster Konstantin Sergeyev in his 1951 version for the Kirov/Mariinsky Ballet as a dance for a Court Jester).
- the Valse des fiancées (Scène: La sortie des invités et la valse, No. 17) was edited so that, instead of a separate entrance for each prospective bride and her family, one single entrance would suffice.
- the Grand Pas de Six (no.19) was deleted (many choreographers have re-worked this number in various stagings, most notably Kenneth MacMillan for his production for the Royal Ballet).
- the Russian Dance Tchaikovsky composed for Pelagia Karpakova (catalogued as appendix no. 2 in the original score) was deleted (this number is often used in various modern stagings of the ballet, and has even been used as an Arabian Dance, as in the Pacific Northwest Ballet's production staged by Kent Stowell).
- the Pas de Deux that was composed by Ludwig Minkus for the Ballerina Anna Sobeshchanskaya, which was partially re-orchestrated/adapted by Tchaikovsky (catalogued as appendix no. 1 in the original score), was deleted (today this Pas is known as the Tchaikovsky Pas de Deux in George Balanchine's celebrated version).
- the Grand Pas de Deux (aka The Black Swan Pas de Deux) was fashioned from the music of the Pas de Deux for Two Merry Makers (No. 5 in the original score). The Adagio (Andante, No. 5-2) was modified by Drigo - this number originally ended with an Allegro movement in A major for solo violin, which was cut. As he had done with the Grand Adagio of the second scene, Drigo composed a new ending for the Adagio, inserted at bar 75 (this version of the Adagio of The Black Swan Pas de Deux is still used by nearly every ballet company today).
- the traditional variation for Prince Siegfried was first performed by Vakhtang Chabukiani when he performed the role at the Kirov Theatre in 1932. The music was fashioned from the omitted allegro ending for solo violin of No. 5-2. The Marinsky Theatre's orchestral score titles this variation as "Variation Chabukiani". Eventually, this variation came to be used in nearly all productions of Swan Lake around the world.
- the Tempo di valse (No. 5-3) was retained as a male variation in 1895. In Tchaikovsky's original score, this piece led into the proceeding coda (No. 5-4). In light of this, the final 2 bars were deleted and a new bar of music was added to conclude the piece. Since the danseur Pavel Gerdt was over fifty years of age at the time of the premiere of the 1895 revival, this variation was performed by Alexander Gorsky.
- the now familiar Variation of Odile of The Black Swan Pas de Deux was orchestrated by Drigo from Tchaikovsky's Opus 72 for Piano - No. 12 L'Espiègle, which is still danced today by nearly every Ballerina as Odile.
- in the Finale (Scène, No. 24), the reprise of the waltz from No. 17 (Scène: La sortie des invités et la valse) was omitted.

Act IV (or Act III)

- The Entr'acte (No. 25) was edited and further modified so that the music could move to a new key and lead into the following number.
- The Scène (No. 26) and the Dance of the Little Swans (No. 27) were deleted. Here the second addition was inserted - another piece from Tchaikovsky's Opus 72 for Piano - No. 11 Valse Bluette, which was used as a Waltz for White and Black Swans (this number is not performed by many companies, but is still retained by the Kirov/Mariinsky Ballet and the Royal Ballet).
- At bar 26 of No. 28 the third addition from Tchaikovsky's Opus 72 for Piano was inserted - No. 15 Un poco di Chopin, orchestrated by Drigo as a Pas d'action for Prince Siegfried and Odette in which the lovers reconcile. After this number, the music continued at bar 27 of No. 28. The so-called "storm music" was deleted, and the music resumed. The final passage of music which contained tremendous dynamics from the brass section was softened.

== Drigo's edition of the score ==
NOTE - the numbers of each of the dances/scenes correspond with Tchaikovsky's original score. The titles of each of the dances/scenes come from the published libretto and the program of the premiere of the 1895 revival, most differing from the titles of the original score. Although this list indicates the most prominent changes to each individual dance/scene, it does not list such changes as deletions of bars of music, etc.

Act I (scene 1) (originally Act I)

- Introduction
- No. 1 Scène
- No. 4 Pas de trois

no.4-1 Entrée
no.4-2 Andante sostenuto - DELETED
no.4-3 Variation 1 (changed from Allegro Semplice to Allegro Moderato)
no.4-4 Variation 2
no.4-5 Variation 3
no.4-6 Coda

- No. 3 Scène
- No. 2 Valse champêtre
- No. 6 Pas d'action
- No. 7 (pt.1) Sujet (Introduction to the Danse au cliquetis de verres)
- No. 8 (pt.2) Danse au cliquetis de verres
- No. 9 Départ des chasseurs

Act I (scene 2) (originally Act II)

- No. 10 Scène et entrée d'Odette
- No. 11 Scène dansante
- No. 12 Entrée des cygnes
- No. 13 Grand pas des cygnes

no.13-1 Valse des Cygnes
no.13-5 Grand adage (new ending composed by Drigo, starting at bar 94)
no.13-4 Danse des petits cygnes (the famous Dance of the Little Swans)
no.13-6 Danse des Grands cygnes (changed from Ab major to A major)
no.13-2 Variation d'Odette
no.13-7 Coda générale
no.13-3 Tempo di valse - DELETED

- No. 14 Scène et finale

Act II (originally Act III)

- No. 15 Grand Marche
- No. 16 Ballabile: Dance of the Corps de Ballet and the Dwarves - DELETED
- No. 17 Valse des Fiancées (edited to conform with the new libretto)
- No. 18 Entrée d'Odile
- No. 19 Grand Pas de six - DELETED
- Appendix I: Pas de deux for Anna Sobeshchanskaya (a.k.a. Tchaikovsky Pas de deux) - DELETED
- Appendix II: Russian Dance for Pelagia Karpakova - DELETED
- Grand Divertissement -

No. 21 Pas espagnole (Spanish Dance)
No. 22 Danse napolitaine (Neapolitan Dance)
No. 20 Pas hongroise (Hungarian Dance)
No. 23 Mazurka

- No. 5 Grand Pas d'action (a.k.a. The Black Swan Pas de Deux, fashioned from the Pas de deux for Two Merry-makers)

no.5-1 Entrée
no.5-2 Adage (new ending composed by Drigo, starting at bar 75)
no.5-3 Variation Mons. Gorsky (variation for a male dancer, originally performed by Alexander Gorsky)
Interpolation no.1 - Variation Mlle. Legnani (variation for Odile, orch. by Drigo from Tchaikovsky's Op.72 for Piano -No.12 "L'Espiègle")
no.5-4 Coda

- No. 24 Scène

Act III (originally Act IV)

- No. 25 Entr'acte
- No. 26 Scène - DELETED
- No. 27 Dance of the Little Swans - DELETED
- Interpolation no.2 - Valse des Cygnes (a.k.a. Waltz for White and Black Swans, orch. by Drigo from Tchaikovsky's Op.72 for Piano -No.11 "Valse Bluette")
- No. 28-Pt.1 Scène (ends at bar 26. Continues after the next number)
- Interpolation no.3 - Scène Dansante (inserted after bar 26 of No.28, orch. by Drigo from Tchaikovsky's Op.72 for Piano -No.15 "Un poco di Chopin")
- No. 28-Pt.2 Scène (continues at bar 27)
- No. 29 Scène et final. Apothéose

== Libretto ==
The 1895 libretto, as translated by Roland John Wiley

ACT 1

Tableau I - A park in front of a castle

Scene 1

Benno and his comrades are waiting for Prince Siegfried in order to celebrate his coming of age. Prince Siegfried enters with Wolfgang. The feast begins. Peasant men and women arrive to congratulate the Prince, who invites the men to wine and gives ribbons to the women. The tipsy Wolfgang sees to Siegfried's wishes. Dances of the peasants.

Scene 2

Servants announce the arrival of the Princess, Siegfried's mother, which throws the party into disarray. The dances stop, servants hurriedly take away the tables and conceal the traces of celebration. Wolfgang and the young men feign abstinence. The Princess enters, preceded by her retinue; Siegfried greets her respectfully. She gently reproaches him for trying to deceive her, for she knows he has been celebrating, and she has come not to keep him from that, but to remind him that his last day of bachelorhood has dawned, and that tomorrow he must be married. To the question, 'Who will be the bride?' the Princess answers that this will be decided at a ball the next day to which she has invited all the young women worthy of becoming her daughter and his wife. He shall select the one that pleases him most. Wishing to let the party continue, the Princess departs.

Scene 3

The Prince is pensive over parting with his free and easy bachelor's life. Benno persuades him not to spoil an agreeable present by his concern for the future. Siegfried signals for the party to continue, and the feast and dancing are renewed. Wolfgang, completely drunk, amuses everybody with his dancing.

Scene 4

Night is falling. A farewell dance and it will be time to disperse. A dance with cups.

Scene 5

A band of swans flies overhead. At the sight, the young men, still wide awake, decide to end the day with a hunt. Benno knows where the swans fly for the night. Leaving the drunken Wolfgang behind, the youths depart.

Tableau II - A rocky, wild locale. In the depth of the stage, a lake. At the right, on the shore, the ruins of a chapel. A moonlit night.

Scene 1

A band of white swans swims around the lake. In the front is a swan with a crown on its head.

Scene 2

Benno and several of the Prince's other friends rush in. Noticing the swans, they take aim, but the swans swim away. Benno, having sent the other to inform the Prince, is left alone. Swans transformed into beautiful young women surround him; he is staggered by the magical phenomenon and is powerless against their spells. The Prince's comrades return, and the swans fall back. The young men are about to shoot; the Prince arrives and also takes aim, but the ruins are illuminated by a magic light and Odette appears, pleading for mercy.

Scene 3

Siegfried, struck by her beauty, forbids his comrades to shoot. She thanks him, and explains that she, Princess Odette, and the other young women are the unhappy victims of an evil genie who has bewitched them. They are fated by day to take the form of swans and only at night, near these ruins, can they regain their human form. Their master, in the form of an owl, stands guard over them. His terrible spell will continue until someone falls truly in love with her, for life; only a person who has never sworn his love to another woman can be her rescuer and return her to her previous state. Siegfried listens, enchanted. The owl flies in, and transformed into an evil genie that appears amidst the ruins, overhears them, and disappears. Horror possesses Siegfried at the thought that he might have killed Odette when she was still a swan. He breaks his bow and indignantly throws it away. Odette consoles him.

Scene 4

Odette summons her friends and with them tries to divert him with dances. Siegfried is ever more captivated by Princess Odette's beauty and offers to be her rescuer. He has yet to swear his love to anyone, and can therefore free her from the evil genie. He will kill it and so free Odette. She responds that this is impossible: the evil genie's end will come only when some madman sacrifices himself to Odette's love. Siegfried is prepared to do this; for her sake, he would gladly die. Odette believes in his love, and that he has never sworn it before. But tomorrow a number of beautiful women will come to his mother's court, and he must choose one of them as his spouse. Siegfried says that he will be a bridegroom only when she, Odette, appears at the ball. Odette responds that she cannot because at that time she can only fly around the castle as a swan. The Prince swears that he will not betray her. Touched by his love, Odette accepts his vow but warns that the evil genie will do everything to make him swear it to another woman. Siegfried still promises that no spell will take Odette from him.

Scene 5

Dawn is breaking. Odette takes leave of her beloved and disappears with her friends into the ruins. The dawn brightens. A flock of swans swims out on the lake and above them flies a large owl, waving its wings heavily.

ACT 2

A magnificent hall. Everything is ready for a celebration.

Scene 1

The master of ceremonies gives last-minute orders to the servants. He meets and places the arriving guests. The Princess and Siegfried enter in the vanguard of the court. A procession of the prospective brides and their parents. A general dance. Waltz of the brides.

Scene 2

The Princess asks her son which of the young women pleases him most. Siegfried finds them all charming, but to none could he swear eternal love.

Scene 3

Trumpets announce new guests: von Rothbart and his daughter Odile, transformed in the guise, Odette. Siegfried is struck by her likeness to Odette and greets her enthusiastically. Odette, in the form of a white swan, appears at the window, warning her beloved of the evil genie's spell. But attracted to the beauty of the new guest, he sees only her. The dances begin again.

Scene 4

Siegfried's choice is made. Convinced that Odile and Odette are the same people, he chooses Odile, transformed in the guise of Odette, as his bride. Rothbart triumphantly takes Odile, his daughter's hand and gives it to the young man, who vows his eternal love. Siegfried then sees Odette, in the form of a white swan, at the window. He realises he has been deceived, but it is too late: the vow is spoken, Rothbart and Odile disappear. Odette must remain forever in the evil sorcerer, Rothbart's power; as an owl, it appears above Odette at the window. The Prince runs out in a burst of despair. General confusion.

ACT 3

A deserted place near the swan lake. The magic ruins are in the distance. Cliffs. Night.

Scene 1

Odette runs in. The swans greet her joyfully but despair when they learn of Siegfried's betrayal. All is finished; the evil genie has triumphed and there is no rescue for Odette: the evil spell will last forever. It would be better, while she is still a woman, to perish in the waves of the lake than to live without Siegfried. In vain her friends try to console her.

Scene 2

Siegfried runs in. He is searching for Odette so that he can beg forgiveness at her feet for his unintended betrayal. He loves her alone and swore fidelity to Odile because he thought she was Odette. At the sight of her beloved, Odette forgets her grief, and both give themselves over to the joy of meeting.

Scene 3

The evil genie interrupts this momentary enchantment. Siegfried must fulfill his vow and marry Odile; with the coming of dawn, Odette will change into a swan forever. It is better for her to die while there is time. Siegfried swears to die with her. The evil genie vanishes in terror: death for the sake of Odette's love is his end. The unfortunate girl embraces Siegfried one last time and runs to the cliff to jump from its height. The evil genie as an owl hovers over her, trying to change her into a swan. Siegfried rushes to her assistance, and with her throws himself into the lake. The owl falls, dead.

APOTHEOSIS

== 2016 reconstruction ==
For the 2015–2016 season of the Zurich Ballet, Russian choreographer, Alexei Ratmansky staged a reconstruction of the Petipa/Ivanov staging of Swan Lake from the notation scores of the Sergeyev Collection. The reconstruction premiered on 6 February 2016 at the Zurich Opera House. The reconstruction was later staged at the Teatro alla Scala in Milan on 30 June 2016, and at the Miami City Ballet on 11 February 2022.

== Bibliography ==
- C. W. Beaumont. The Ballet called Swan Lake (London, 1952)
- Wiley, Roland John. Tchaikovsky’s Ballets: Swan Lake, Sleeping Beauty, Nutcracker (Oxford, 1985, 2/1991)
- Wiley, Roland John. The Life and Ballets of Lev Ivanov (Oxford, 1997)
