= Shertzer =

Shertzer is a surname. Notable people with the surname include:

- Marion Corwell-Shertzer (1926–2016), American journalist
- Hymie Shertzer (1909–1977), American jazz saxophonist
- Janine Shertzer (born 1956), American computational physicist

== See also ==
- Schertzer
