= Swan Lake =

1877 ballet by Pyotr Ilyich Tchaikovsky

- Choreographer: Julius Reisinger
- Music: Pyotr Ilyich Tchaikovsky
- Premiere: 4 March [O.S. 20 February] 1877; Moscow
- Original ballet company: Bolshoi Ballet
- Genre: Classical ballet

Swan Lake (Russian: Лебединое озеро) is a ballet composed by Russian composer Pyotr Ilyich Tchaikovsky in 1875–76. Despite its initial failure, it is now one of the most popular ballets of all time.

The scenario, initially in two acts, was based on Russian and German folk tales, telling a story of Odette, a princess turned into a swan by an evil sorcerer's curse.

The ballet was premiered by the Bolshoi Ballet on 4 March [O.S. 20 February] 1877 at the Bolshoi Theatre in Moscow. The choreographer of this original production was Julius Reisinger (Václav Reisinger).

Most ballet companies now base their performances on the 1895 revival of Marius Petipa and Lev Ivanov, first staged for the Imperial Ballet on 15 January 1895, at the Mariinsky Theatre in St. Petersburg. For this revival, Tchaikovsky's score was revised by Riccardo Drigo.

== History ==
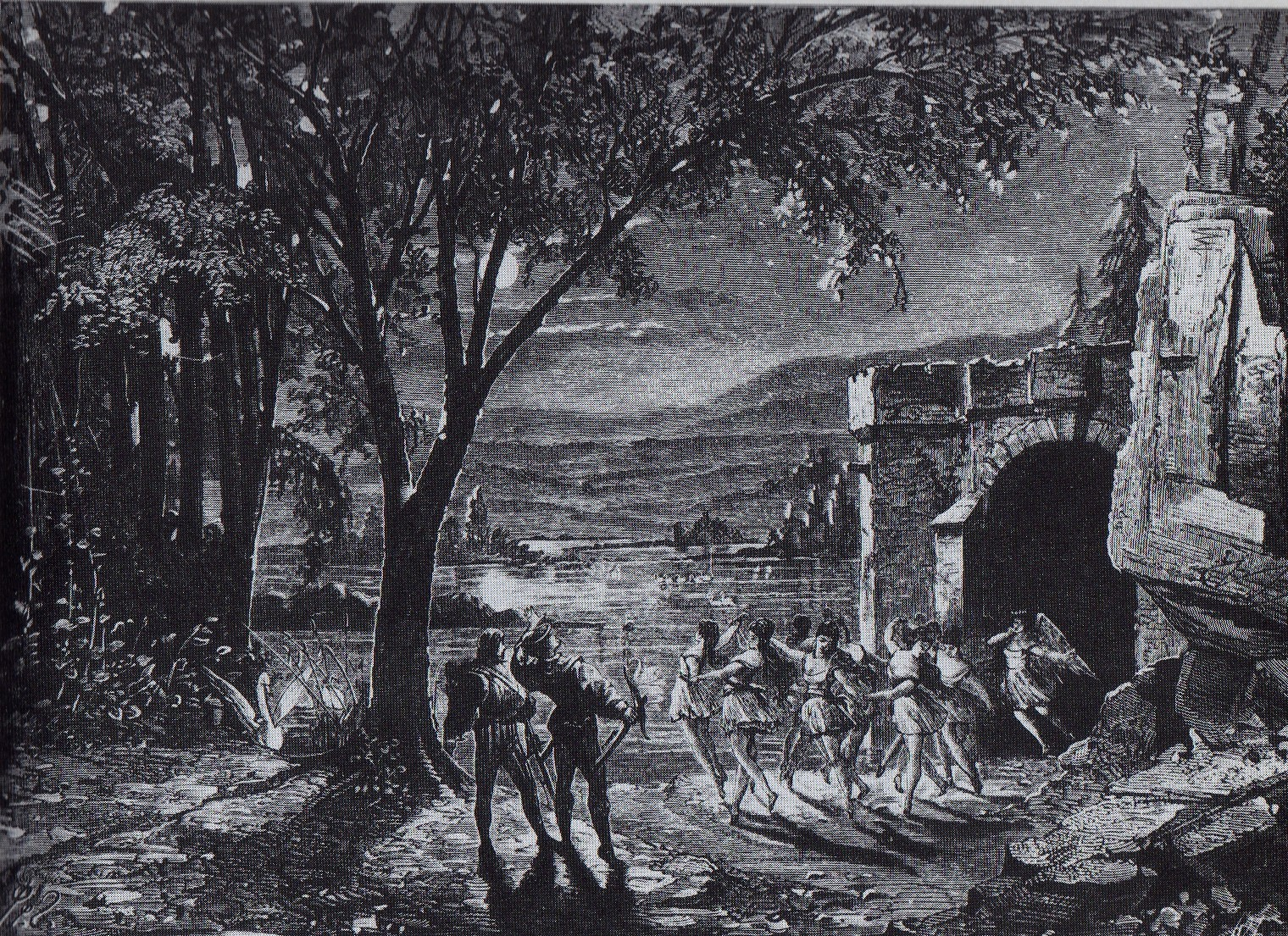
Design by Frédéric de Haenen for the décor of act 2, Moscow 1877

=== Origins of the ballet ===
The authorship of the original libretto remains uncertain, and the precise origins of the narrative are likewise obscure. Russian and German folk traditions have been suggested as possible sources, among them Johann Karl August Musäus’s 1784 tale The Stolen Veil, from the collection Volksmärchen der Deutschen and based on the Swan maiden myth. These accounts, however, bear only limited resemblance to the storyline of the ballet.

As reported by other sources, the story does not have a specific author, as it was shaped through ballet conventions. Several critics have noted that many ideas in the libretto appear in legends from various countries, and that a German setting was also frequent in nineteenth-century ballets. Siegfried's character resembles Albrecht from Giselle, as both are deceived into betraying their beloved, and the ball to choose a bride appears in La fille du Danube. The swan maidens may be variations of the wilis and sylphs common in Romantic ballets. The story also has connections with Daniel Auber’s opera Le lac des fées.

One hypothesis proposes that the original choreographer, Julius Reisinger, a Bohemian and thus plausibly acquainted with The Stolen Veil, was responsible for devising the story. An alternative view attributes the authorship to Vladimir Petrovich Begichev, then Director of the Moscow Imperial Theatres, possibly in collaboration with Vasily Geltser, a danseur of the Bolshoi Theatre. A surviving libretto copy indeed bears Begichev’s name. However, as the first published libretto diverges from Tchaikovsky’s score in numerous passages, some scholars have suggested that it may have been prepared by a journalist, based upon observations of the early rehearsals, in line with the contemporary custom of reporting new operatic and balletic productions together with their scenarios in the press.

Another often-cited possibility proposes that the story was invented by Tchaikovsky himself, who reportedly used a similar plot for his earlier short ballet The Lake of the Swans (Ozero lebedei). Even the protagonists’ names were already the same: his brother Modest and his niece Tatiana played Siegfried and Odette, respectively. According to some theories, Tchaikovsky was influenced by Richard Wagner’s operas, which he generally held in high regard. In Der Ring des Nibelungen, there is also a character named Siegfried who, by unknowingly betraying his beloved, ultimately causes his own death. The names of the guests at the ball are reminiscent of characters in Tannhäuser. Even greater parallels can be observed in Lohengrin, such as the use of the swan as a symbol of purity, the presence of an evil sorcerer, the use of heraldic trumpets to signal supernatural events, and the heroine’s death as the result of an unintended betrayal.

Some of Tchaikovsky’s contemporaries noted his keen interest in the life of King Ludwig II of Bavaria, whose existence was said to have been symbolically associated with the swan and who has at times been regarded as a possible prototype for the dreamer figure of Prince Siegfried.

In May 1875 Vladimir Begichev commissioned Tchaikovsky to compose the score for Swan Lake, for which he received a fee of 800 rubles. The composer was provided only with a rudimentary framework from Julius Reisinger, outlining the requirements for each dance. Unlike the instructions for the scores of The Sleeping Beauty and The Nutcracker, no original written directives for Swan Lake were long thought to have survived. For many years, scholarly understanding of aspects such as choreography rested primarily upon contemporary commentaries and reviews. However, in 2015 rehearsal notes dating from as early as 1876 were identified in the Institute for Art Studies in Moscow, offering fresh insight into the nature of the ballet’s original 1877 production.

=== Tchaikovsky's influences ===
From around the time of the turn of the 19th century until the beginning of the 1890s, scores for ballets were almost always written by composers known as "specialists" who were highly skilled at scoring the light, decorative, melodious, and rhythmically clear music that was at that time in vogue for ballet. Tchaikovsky studied the music of "specialists" such as the Italian Cesare Pugni and the Austrian Ludwig Minkus, before setting to work on Swan Lake.

Tchaikovsky had a rather negative opinion of the "specialist" ballet music until he studied it in detail, being impressed by the nearly limitless variety of infectious melodies their scores contained. Tchaikovsky most admired the ballet music of such composers as Léo Delibes, Adolphe Adam, and later, Riccardo Drigo. He would later write to his protégé, the composer Sergei Taneyev, "I listened to the Delibes ballet Sylvia ... what charm, what elegance, what wealth of melody, rhythm, and harmony. I was ashamed, for if I had known of this music then, I would not have written Swan Lake." Tchaikovsky most admired Adam's 1844 score for Giselle, which used the Leitmotif technique: associating certain themes with certain characters or moods, a technique he would use in Swan Lake and, later, The Sleeping Beauty.

Tchaikovsky drew on previous compositions for his Swan Lake score. According to two of Tchaikovsky's relatives – his nephew Yuri Lvovich Davydov and his niece Anna Meck-Davydova – the composer had earlier created a little ballet called The Lake of the Swans at their home in 1871. This ballet included the famous Leitmotif, the "Swan's Theme" or "Song of the Swans". He also made use of material from The Voyevoda, an opera he had abandoned in 1868. Another number which included a theme from The Voyevoda was the Entr'acte of the fourth scene and the opening of the Finale (Act IV, No. 29). The Grand adage (a.k.a. the "Love Duet") from the second scene of Swan Lake was fashioned from the final love duet from his opera Undina, abandoned in 1873.

By April 1876 the score was complete, and rehearsals began. Soon Reisinger began setting certain numbers aside that he dubbed "undanceable". Reisinger even began choreographing dances to other composers' music, but Tchaikovsky protested and his pieces were reinstated. Although the two artists were required to collaborate, each seemed to prefer working as independently of the other as possible. At times, Tchaikovsky actually ended up turning to Alina Bryullova, a family acquaintance, for advice on how he should write music for ballet; she later recalled that due to her lack of expertise she "could give him practically no advice."

=== Composition process ===
Tchaikovsky's excitement with Swan Lake is evident from the speed with which he composed: commissioned in the spring of 1875, the piece was created within one year. His letters to Sergei Taneyev from August 1875 indicate, however, that it was not only his excitement that compelled him to create it so quickly but his wish to finish it as soon as possible, so as to allow him to start on an opera. Respectively, he created scores of the first three numbers of the ballet, then the orchestration in the fall and winter, and was still struggling with the instrumentation in the spring. By April 1876, the work was complete. Tchaikovsky's mention of a draft suggests the presence of some sort of abstract but no such draft has ever been seen. Tchaikovsky wrote various letters to friends expressing his longstanding desire to work with this type of music, and his excitement concerning his current stimulating, albeit laborious task.

=== Performance history ===
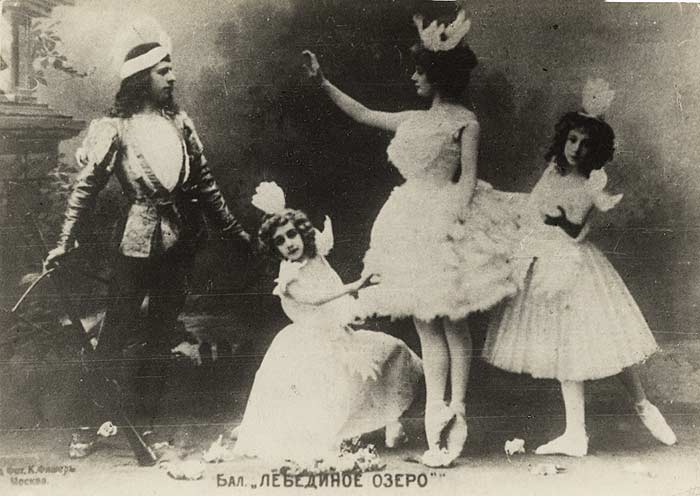
Adelina Juri as Odette and Mikhail Mordkin as Prince Siegfried in Aleksandr Gorsky's staging of the Petipa/Ivanov Swan Lake for the Bolshoi Theatre, Moscow, 1901. A young Vera Karalli is seen kneeling.

==== Moscow première (world première) ====
- Date: 4 March (OS 20 February) 1877
- Place: Bolshoi Theatre, Moscow
- Balletmaster: Julius Reisinger
- Conductor: Stepan Ryabov
- Scene Designers: Karl Valts (acts 2 & 4), Ivan Shangin (act 1), Karl Groppius (act 3)

==== St. Petersburg première ====
- Date: 27 January 1895
- Place: Mariinsky Theatre, St. Petersburg
- Balletmaster: Marius Petipa (acts 1 & 3), Lev Ivanov (acts 2 & 4)
- Conductor: Riccardo Drigo
- Scene Designers: Ivan Andreyev, Mikhail Bocharov, Henrich Levogt
- Costume Designer: Yevgeni Ponomaryov

==== Other notable productions ====
- 1880 and 1882, Moscow, Bolshoi Theatre, staged by Joseph Hansen after Reisinger, conductor and designers as in première
- 1901, Moscow, Bolshoi Theatre, staged by Aleksandr Gorsky, conducted by Andrey Arends, scenes by Aleksandr Golovin (act 1), Konstantin Korovin (acts 2 & 4), N. Klodt (act 3)
- 1911, London, Ballets Russes, Sergei Diaghilev production, choreography by Michel Fokine after Petipa–Ivanov, scenes by Golovin and Korovin
- 1934, London, Royal Opera House company premiere, The Vic-Wells Ballet
- 1946, London, Royal Opera House premiere, Sadler's Wells Ballet

==== Original interpreters ====
Role	Moscow 1877	Moscow 1880	St. Petersburg 1895	Moscow 1901	London 1911	London 1946
Queen	Olga Nikolayeva		Giuseppina Cecchetti			
Siegfried	Victor Gillert	Alfred Bekefi	Pavel Gerdt	Mikhail Mordkin	Vaslav Nijinsky	Robert Helpmann
Benno	Sergey Nikitin		Aleksandr Oblakov			Leslie Edwards
Wolfgang	Wilhelm Wanner		Gillert			Paul Reymond
Odette	Pelageya Karpakova	Yevdokiya Kalmїkova	Pierina Legnani	Adelina Juri	Mathilde Kschessinska	Margot Fonteyn
Von Rothbart	Sergey Sokolov		Aleksey Bulgakov	K. Kubakin		David Davenport
Odile	Pelageya Karpakova		Pierina Legnani		Mathilde Kschessinska	Margot Fonteyn

==== Original production of 1877 ====
The première on 4 March 1877 was given as a benefit performance for the ballerina Pelageya Karpakova (also known as Polina Karpakova), who performed the role of Odette, with première danseur Victor Gillert as Prince Siegfried. Karpakova may also have danced the part Odile, although it is believed the ballet originally called for two different dancers. It is now common practice for the same ballerina to dance both Odette and Odile.

The Russian ballerina Anna Sobeshchanskaya was originally cast as Odette, but was replaced when a governing official in Moscow complained about her.

The première was not well received. Though there were a few critics who recognised the virtues of the score, most considered it to be far too complicated for ballet. It was labelled "too noisy, too 'Wagnerian' and too symphonic." The critics also thought Reisinger's choreography was "unimaginative and altogether unmemorable." The German origins of the story were "treated with suspicion while the tale itself was regarded as 'stupid' with unpronounceable surnames for its characters." Karpakova was a secondary soloist and "not particularly convincing."

The poverty of the production, meaning the décor and costumes, the absence of outstanding performers, the Balletmaster's weakness of imagination, and, finally, the orchestra ... all of this together permitted (Tchaikovsky) with good reason to cast the blame for the failure on others.

— Modest Tchaikovsky, brother of the composer

Yet the fact remains (and is too often omitted in accounts of this initial production) that this staging survived for six years with a total of 41 performances – many more than several other ballets from the repertoire of this theatre.

==== Tchaikovsky pas de deux 1877 ====
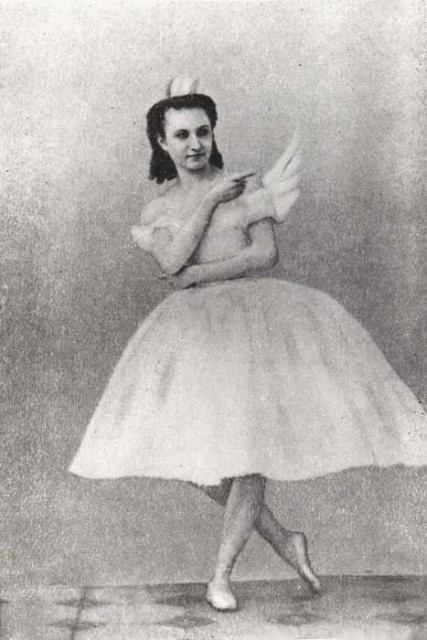
Anna Sobeshchanskaya as Odette in Julius Reisinger's original production of Swan Lake, Moscow 1877

On 26 April 1877, Anna Sobeshchanskaya made her début as Odette/Odile in Swan Lake, and from the start, she was completely dissatisfied with the ballet. Sobeshchanskaya asked Marius Petipa—Premier Maître de Ballet of the St. Petersburg Imperial Theatres—to choreograph a pas de deux to replace the pas de six in the third act (for a ballerina to request a supplemental pas or variation was standard practice in 19th-century ballet, and often these "custom-made" dances were the legal property of the ballerina they were composed for).

Petipa created the pas de deux to music by Ludwig Minkus, ballet composer to the St Petersburg Imperial Theatres. The piece was a standard pas de deux classique consisting of a short entrée, the grand adage, a variation for each dancer individually, and a coda.

Tchaikovsky was angered by this change, stating that whether the ballet was good or bad, he alone should be held responsible for its music. He agreed to compose a new pas de deux, but soon a problem arose: Sobeshchanskaya wanted to retain Petipa's choreography. Tchaikovsky agreed to compose a pas de deux that would match to such a degree, the ballerina would not even be required to rehearse. Sobeshchanskaya was so pleased with Tchaikovsky's new music, she requested he compose an additional variation, which he did.

Until 1953 this pas de deux was thought to be lost, until a repétiteur score was accidentally found in the archives of the Moscow Bolshoi Theatre, among orchestral parts for Alexander Gorsky's revival of Le Corsaire (Gorsky had included the piece in his version of Le Corsaire staged in 1912). In 1960 George Balanchine choreographed a pas de deux to this music for Violette Verdy and Conrad Ludlow, performed at the City Center of Music and Drama in New York City as Tschaikovsky Pas de Deux, as it is still known and performed today.

==== Subsequent productions 1879–1894 ====
Julius Reisinger's successor as balletmaster was Joseph Peter Hansen. Hansen made considerable efforts to salvage Swan Lake and on 13 January 1880 he presented a new production of the ballet for his own benefit performance. The part of Odette/Odile was danced by Evdokia Kalmykova, a student of the Moscow Imperial Ballet School, with Alfred Bekefi as Prince Siegfried. This production was better received than the original, but by no means a great success. Hansen presented another version of Swan Lake on 28 October 1882, again with Kalmykova as Odette/Odile. For this production Hansen arranged a Grand Pas for the ballroom scene which he titled La Cosmopolitana. This was taken from the European section of the Grand Pas d'action known as The Allegory of the Continents from Marius Petipa's 1875 ballet The Bandits to the music of Ludwig Minkus. Hansen's version of Swan Lake was given only four times, the final performance being on 2 January 1883, and soon the ballet was dropped from the repertory altogether.

In all, Swan Lake was performed 41 times between its première and the final performance of 1883 – a rather lengthy run for a ballet that was so poorly received upon its première. Hansen became Balletmaster to the Alhambra Theatre in London and on 1 December 1884 he presented a one-act ballet titled The Swans, which was inspired by the second scene of Swan Lake. The music was composed by the Alhambra Theatre's chef d'orchestre Georges Jacoby.

The second scene of Swan Lake was then presented on 21 February in Prague by the Ballet of the National Theatre in a version mounted by the Balletmaster August Berger. The ballet was given during two concerts which were conducted by Tchaikovsky. The composer noted in his diary that he experienced "a moment of absolute happiness" when the ballet was performed. Berger's production followed the 1877 libretto, though the names of Prince Siegfried and Benno were changed to Jaroslav and Zdeňek, with the rôle of Benno danced by a female dancer en travestie. The rôle of Prince Siegfried was danced by Berger himself with the ballerina Giulietta Paltriniera-Bergrova as Odette. Berger's production was only given eight performances and was even planned for production at the Fantasia Garden in Moscow in 1893, but it never materialised.

==== Petipa–Ivanov–Drigo revival of 1895 ====
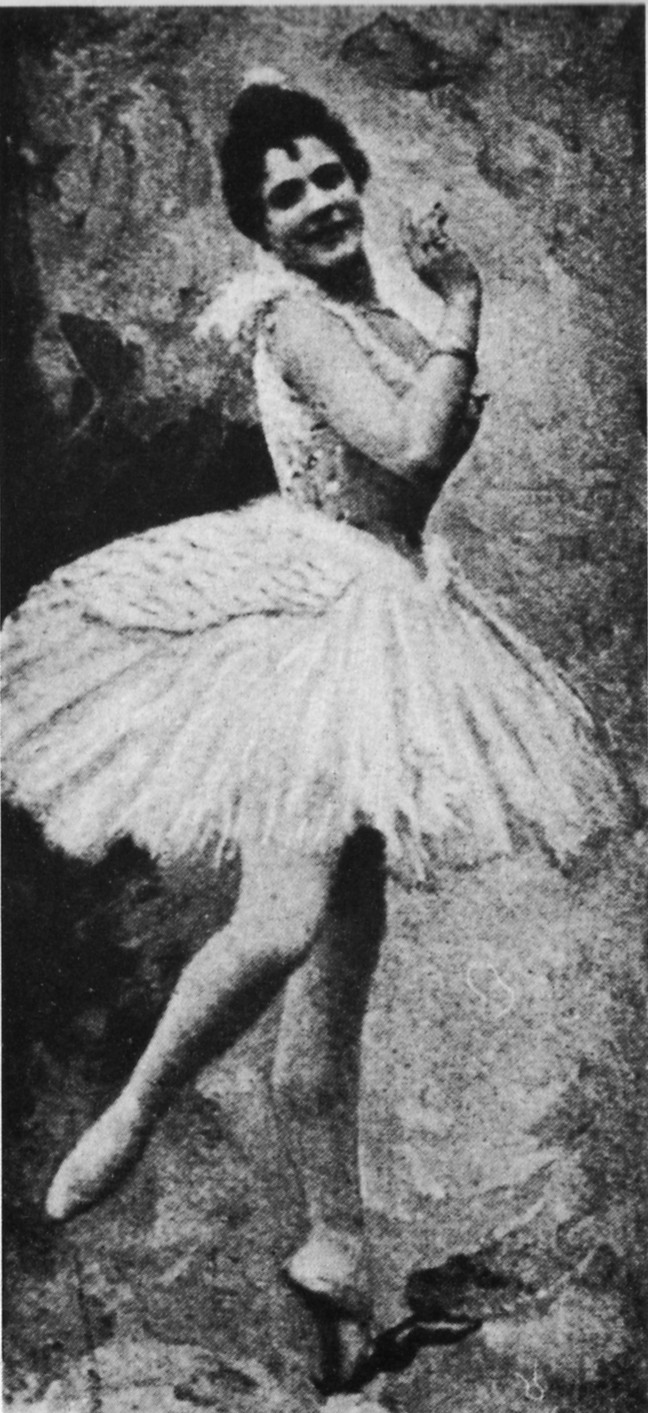
Pierina Legnani as Odette (1895)

During the late 1880s and early 1890s, Petipa and Vsevolozhsky discussed with Tchaikovsky the possibility of reviving Swan Lake. However, Tchaikovsky died on 6 November 1893, just when plans to revive Swan Lake were beginning to come to fruition. It remains uncertain whether Tchaikovsky was prepared to revise the music for this revival. Whatever the case, as a result of Tchaikovsky's death, Riccardo Drigo revised the score, after receiving approval from Tchaikovsky's younger brother, Modest. There are major differences between Drigo's and Tchaikovsky's scores. Today, it is Drigo's revision, and not Tchaikovsky's original score of 1877, that most ballet companies use.

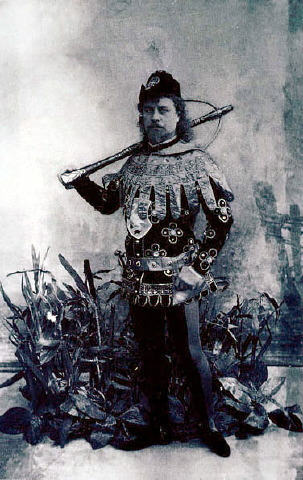
Pavel Gerdt as Prince Siegfried (Mariinsky Theatre, 1895)

In February 1894, two memorial concerts planned by Vsevolozhsky were given in honor of Tchaikovsky. The production included the second act of Swan Lake, choreographed by Lev Ivanov, Second Balletmaster to the Imperial Ballet. The turnout for the revival concert was not as great as anticipated due to the mixed program as well as higher-than-usual ticket prices, leaving the theater hall half-empty. Despite the small audience, Ivanov's choreography for the memorial concert was unanimously praised by critics, and audiences received the concert with praise.

The revival of Swan Lake was planned for Pierina Legnani's benefit performance in the 1894–1895 season. The death of Tsar Alexander III on 1 November 1894 and the ensuing period of official mourning brought all ballet performances and rehearsals to a close for some time, and as a result all efforts could be concentrated on the pre-production of the full revival of Swan Lake. Ivanov and Petipa collaborated on the production, with Ivanov retaining his dances for the second act while choreographing the fourth, with Petipa staging the first and third acts.

Modest Tchaikovsky was called upon to make changes to the ballet's libretto, including the character of Odette changing from a fairy swan-maiden into a cursed mortal woman, the ballet's villain changing from Odette's stepmother to the magician von Rothbart, and the ballet's finale: instead of the lovers simply drowning at the hand of Odette's stepmother as in the original 1877 scenario, Odette dies by drowning herself, with Prince Siegfried choosing to die as well, rather than live without her, and soon the lovers' spirits are reunited in an apotheosis. Aside from the revision of the libretto the ballet was changed from four acts to three—with act 2 becoming act 1, scene 2.

All was ready by the beginning of 1895 and the ballet had its première on 27 January. Pierina Legnani danced Odette/Odile, with Pavel Gerdt as Prince Siegfried, Alexei Bulgakov as Rothbart, and Alexander Oblakov as Benno. Most of the reviews in the St. Petersburg newspapers were positive.

Unlike the première of The Sleeping Beauty, Swan Lake did not dominate the repertory of the Mariinsky Theatre in its first season. It was given only sixteen performances between the première and the 1895–1896 season, and was not performed at all in 1897. Even more surprising, the ballet was performed only four times in 1898 and 1899. The ballet belonged solely to Legnani until she left St. Petersburg for her native Italy in 1901. After her departure, the ballet was taken over by Mathilde Kschessinskaya, who was as much celebrated in the rôle as was her Italian predecessor.

==== Later productions ====
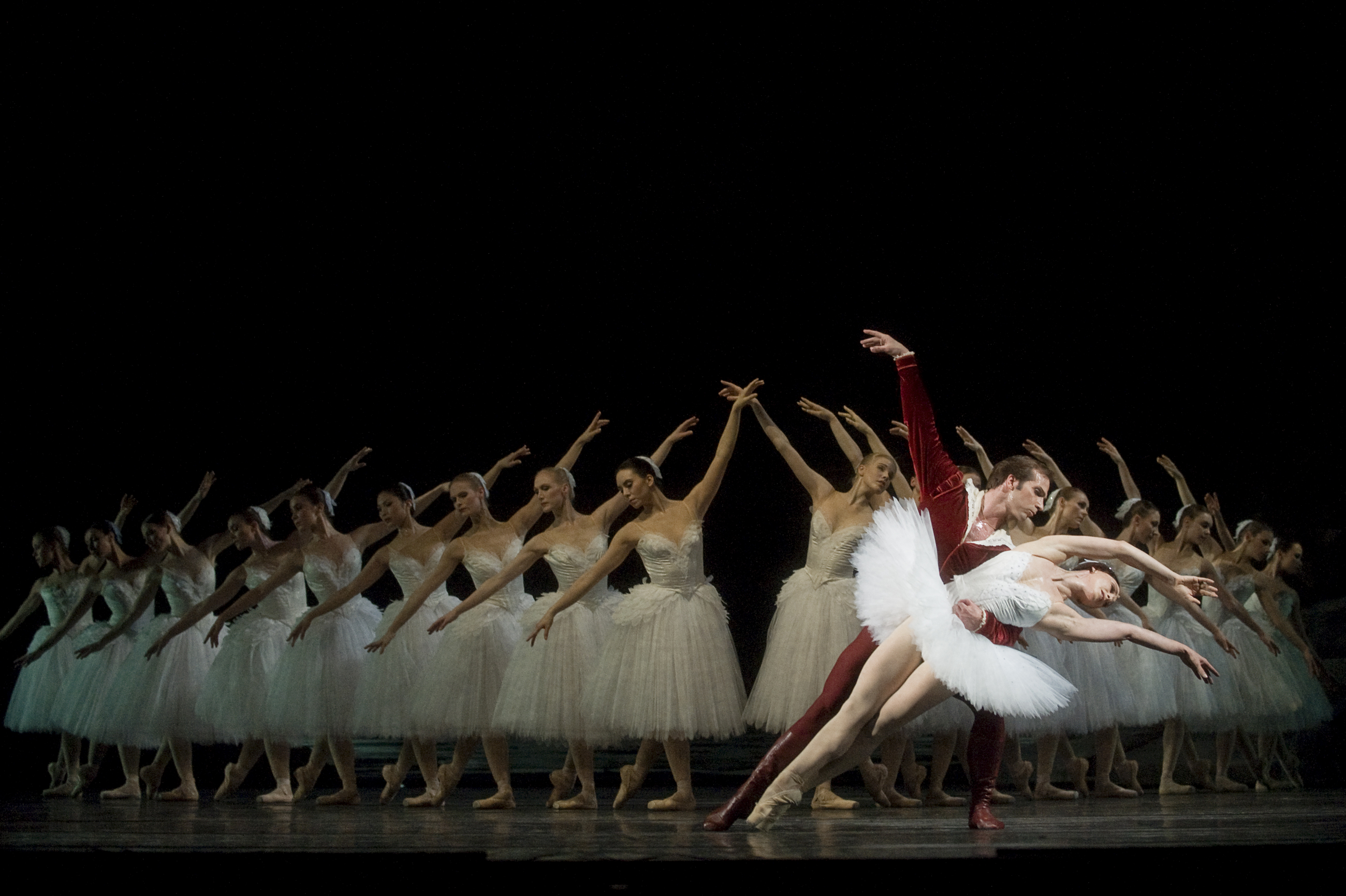
A 2008 production at the Royal Swedish Opera

Throughout the performance history of Swan Lake, the 1895 edition has served as the version on which most stagings have been based. Nearly every balletmaster or choreographer who has re-staged Swan Lake has made modifications to the ballet's scenario, while still maintaining much of the traditional choreography for the dances, which is regarded as virtually sacrosanct. Likewise, over time the rôle of Siegfried has become more prominent, due largely to the evolution of ballet technique.

In 1922, Finnish National Ballet was the first European company that staged a complete production of the ballet. By the time Swan Lake premiered in Helsinki in 1922, it had only ever been performed by Russian and Czech ballet groups, and only visiting Russian ballet groups had brought it to Western Europe.

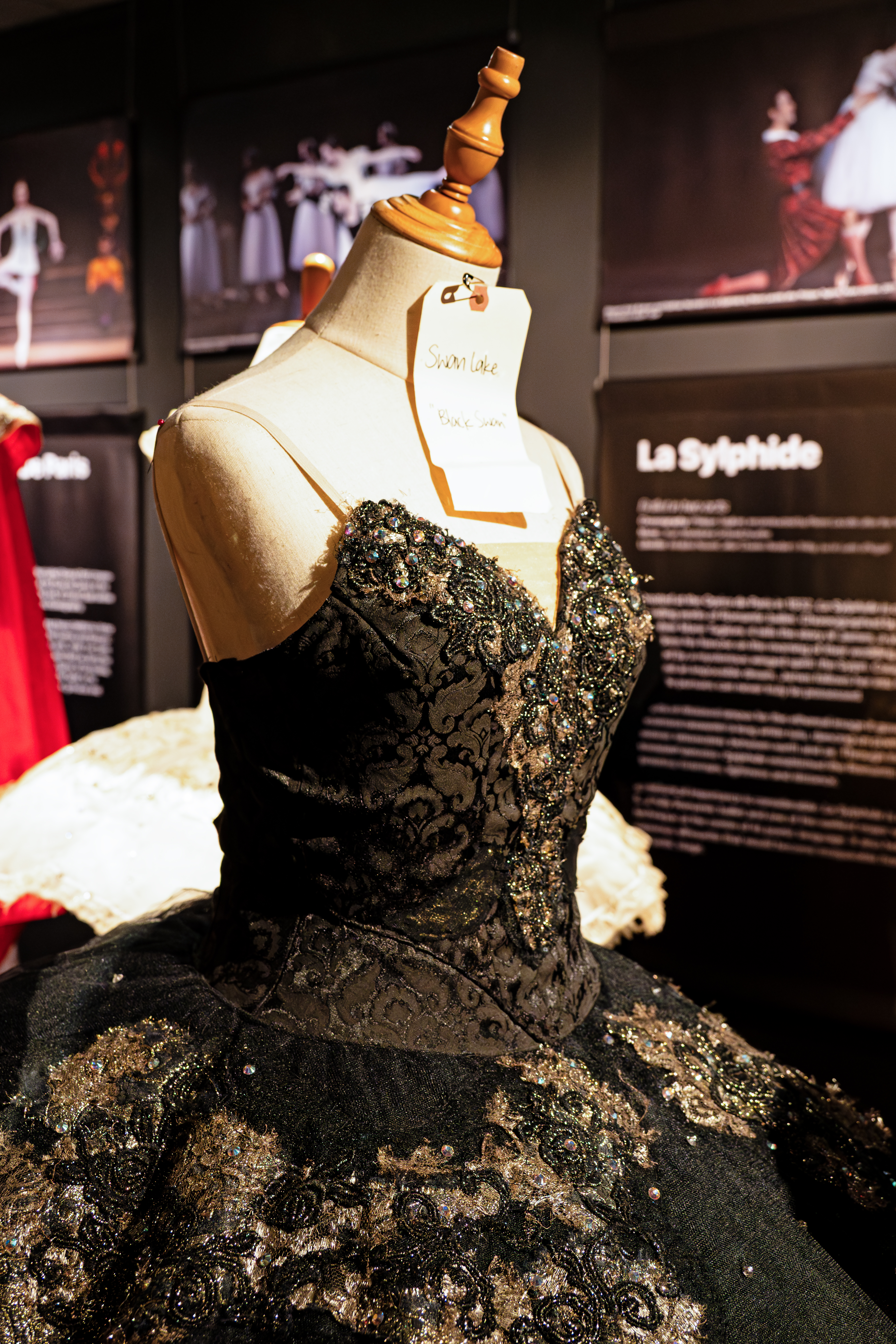
Black Swan costume at a Paris Opera Ballet exhibition.

In 1940, the San Francisco Ballet became the first American company to stage a complete production of Swan Lake. The enormously successful production starred Lew Christensen as Prince Siegfried, Jacqueline Martin as Odette, and Janet Reed as Odile. Willam Christensen based his choreography on the Petipa–Ivanov production, turning to San Francisco's large population of Russian émigrés, headed by Princess and Prince Vasili Alexandrovich of Russia, to help him ensure that the production succeeded in its goal of preserving Russian culture in San Francisco.

Several notable productions have diverged from the original and its 1895 revival:

- In 1967, Erik Bruhn produced and danced in a new Swan Lake for the National Ballet of Canada, with striking largely black and white designs by Desmond Healey. Although substantial portions of the Petipa-Ivanov choreography were retained, Bruhn's alterations were musical as well as choreographic. Most controversially, he recast Von Rothbart as the malevolent Black Queen, adding psychological emphasis to the Prince's difficult relationships with women, his domineering mother included.
- Illusions Like "Swan Lake" 1976: John Neumeier, Hamburg Ballet. Neumeier interpolated the story of Ludwig II of Bavaria into the Swan Lake plot, via Ludwig's fascination with swans. Much of the original score was used with additional Tchaikovsky material and the choreography combined the familiar Petipa/Ivanov material with new dances and scenes by Neumeier. The ballet finishes with Ludwig's death by drowning while confined to an asylum, set to the dramatic music for the act 3 conclusion. With the theme of the unhappy royal being forced into heterosexual marriage for reasons of state and also the cross reference to the personal lives of actual royalty, this work anticipated both Bourne's and Murphy's interpretation. Illusions Like "Swan Lake" remains in the repertoire of major German ballet companies.
- Matthew Bourne's Swan Lake departed from the traditional ballet by replacing the female corps de ballet with male dancers and a plot focused on the psychological pressures of modern royalty on a prince struggling with his sexuality and a distant mother. It has been performed on extended tours in Greece, Israel, Turkey, Australia, Italy, Japan, Korea, Russia, France, Germany, the Netherlands, the United States, and Ireland in addition to the United Kingdom, and has won over thirty international awards to date.
- The 2000 American Ballet Theatre version (taped for television in 2005), rather than having the curtain down as the slow introduction is played, used this music to accompany a new prologue in which the audience is shown how Rothbart first transforms Odette into a swan. This prologue is similar to Vladimir Burmeister's production of Swan Lake (firstly staged in Stanislavsky Theatre in Moscow, 1953) but has some differences. Rothbart in this production is played by two dancers; one appears as a handsome young man who is easily able to lure Odette in the new prologue, and the other dancer is covered in sinister "monster makeup" which reveals the magician's true self. (In the film Black Swan, Natalie Portman, as Nina, dreams this in the film's opening sequence). About half-an-hour of the complete score is omitted from this production.
- Graeme Murphy's Swan Lake was first performed in 2002, and was loosely based on the breakdown of the marriage of Lady Diana to Prince Charles and his relationship with Camilla Parker Bowles. It combined the roles of Rothbart and Odile into that of a Baroness, and the focus of the story is a love triangle.
- In 2010, Black Swan, a film starring Natalie Portman and Mila Kunis, contained sequences from Swan Lake.
- In 2010, South African choreographer and ballet dancer Dada Masilo, remade Tchaikovsky's classic. Her version was a mix of classic ballet and African dance. She also made a plot twist by presenting Odile (the black swan) as a gay male swan rather than a female swan.
- A Swan Lake, choreographed by Alexander Ekman and composed by Mikael Karlsson, was created for the Norwegian National Ballet. The first act is part dance part theatre, about the original production of Swan Lake, which features two stage actors and a soprano. In the second act, the stage is filled in 5000 litres of water, and features the conflict between White Swan and Black Swan.

== Instrumentation ==
Swan Lake is scored for the typical late 19th-century large orchestra:

- Strings: violins I and II; violas, violoncellos; double basses, harp
- Woodwinds: piccolo; 2 flutes; 2 oboes; 2 clarinets in B♭, A and C; 2 bassoons
- Brass: 4 French horns in F; 2 cornets in A and B♭; 2 trumpets in F, D, and E; 3 trombones (2 tenor, 1 bass); tuba
- Percussion: timpani; snare drum; cymbals; bass drum; triangle; tambourine; castanets; tam-tam; glockenspiel; chimes

== Roles ==
- Princess Odette (the Swan Queen, the White Swan, the Swan Princess), a beautiful princess, who has been transformed into a white swan
- Prince Siegfried, a handsome Prince who falls in love with Odette
- Baron Von Rothbart, an evil sorcerer, who has enchanted Odette
- Odile (the Black Swan), Rothbart's daughter
- Benno von Sommerstern, the Prince's friend
- The Queen, Prince Siegfried's mother
- Wolfgang, his tutor
- Baron von Stein
- The Baroness, his wife
- Freiherr von Schwarzfels
- Freiherr von Schwarzfels' wife
- A herald
- A footman
- Court gentlemen and ladies, friends of the prince, heralds, guests, pages, villagers, servants, swans, cygnets

=== Variations to characters ===
By 1895, Benno von Sommerstern had become just "Benno", and Odette "Queen of the Swans". Also Baron von Stein, his wife, and Freiherr von Schwarzfels and his wife were no longer identified on the program. The sovereign or ruling Princess is often rendered "Queen Mother".

The character of Rothbart (sometimes spelled Rotbart) has been open to many interpretations. The reason for his curse upon Odette is unknown; several versions, including two feature films, have suggested reasons, but none is typically explained by the ballet. He is rarely portrayed in human form, except in act 3. He is usually shown as an owl-like creature. In most productions, the couple's sacrifice results in his destruction. However, there are versions in which he is triumphant. Yury Grigorovich's version, which has been danced for several decades by the Bolshoi Ballet, is noted for including both endings: Rothbart was defeated in the original 1969 version, in line with Soviet-era expectations of an upbeat conclusion, but in the 2001 revision, Rothbart plays a wicked game of fate with Siegfried, which he wins at the end, causing Siegfried to lose everything. In the second American Ballet Theatre production of Swan Lake, he is portrayed by two dancers: a young, handsome one who lures Odette to her doom in the prologue, and a reptilian creature. In this version, the lovers' suicide inspires the rest of Rothbart's imprisoned swans to turn on him and overcome his spell.

Odile, Rothbart's daughter usually wears jet black (though in the 1895 production, she did not), and appears only in act 3. In most modern productions, she is portrayed as Odette's exact double (though the resemblance is because of Rothbart's magic), and therefore Siegfried cannot be blamed for believing her to be Odette. There is a suggestion that in the original production, Odette and Odile were danced by two different ballerinas. This is also the case in some avant garde productions.

== Synopsis ==
Swan Lake is generally presented in either four acts, four scenes (primarily outside Russia and Eastern Europe) or three acts, four scenes (primarily in Russia and Eastern Europe). The biggest difference of productions all over the world is that the ending, originally tragic, is now sometimes altered to a happy ending.

=== Prologue ===
Some productions include a prologue that shows how Odette first meets Rothbart, who turns Odette into a swan.

=== Act 1 ===
A magnificent park before a palace

[Scène: Allegro giusto] Prince Siegfried is celebrating his birthday with his tutor, friends, and peasants [Waltz]. The revelries are interrupted by his mother, the Queen [Scène: Allegro moderato], who is concerned about his carefree lifestyle. She tells him that he must choose a bride at the royal ball the following evening (some productions include the presentation of some possible candidates). He is upset that he cannot marry for love. His friend, Benno, and his tutor try to lift his troubled mood. As evening falls [Sujet], Benno sees a flock of swans flying overhead and suggests they go on a hunt [Finale I]. Siegfried and his friends take their crossbows and set off in pursuit of the swans.

=== Act 2 ===
A lakeside clearing in a forest by the ruins of a chapel. A moonlit night.

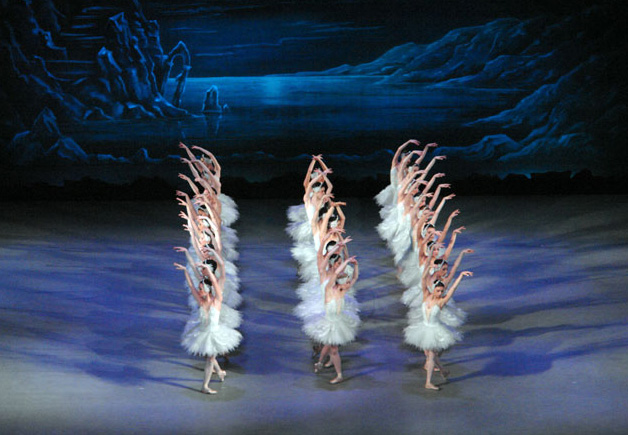
The "Valse des cygnes" from act 2 of the Ivanov/Petipa edition of Swan Lake

Siegfried has become separated from his friends. He arrives at the lakeside clearing, just as a flock of swans lands [Scène. Moderato]. He aims his crossbow [Scène. Allegro moderato], but freezes when one of them transforms into a beautiful maiden named Odette [Scène. Moderato]. At first, she is terrified of him. When he promises not to harm her, she explains that she and her companions are victims of a spell cast by the evil owl-like sorcerer named Rothbart. By day they are turned into swans and only at night, by the side of the enchanted lake – created from the tears of Odette's mother – do they return to human form. The spell can only be broken if one who has never loved before swears to love Odette forever. Rothbart suddenly appears [Scène. Allegro vivo]. Siegfried threatens to kill him but Odette intercedes – if Rothbart dies before the spell is broken, it can never be undone.

As Rothbart disappears, the swan maidens fill the clearing [Scène: Allegro, Moderato assai quasi andante]. Siegfried breaks his crossbow, and sets about winning Odette's trust as they fall in love. But as dawn arrives, the evil spell draws Odette and her companions back to the lake and they are turned into swans again.

=== Act 3 ===
An opulent hall in the palace

Guests arrive at the palace for a costume ball. Six princesses are presented to the prince [Entrance of the Guests and Waltz], as candidates for marriage. Rothbart arrives in disguise [Scène: Allegro, Allegro giusto] with his daughter, Odile, who is transformed to look like Odette. Though the princesses try to attract Siegfried with their dances [Pas de six], he has eyes only for Odile. [Scène: Allegro, Tempo di valse, Allegro vivo] Odette appears at the castle window and attempts to warn him, but he does not see her. He then proclaims to the court that he will marry Odile before Rothbart shows him a magical vision of Odette. Grief-stricken and realizing his mistake (he vowed only to love Odette), he hurries back to the lake.

=== Act 4 ===
By the lakeside

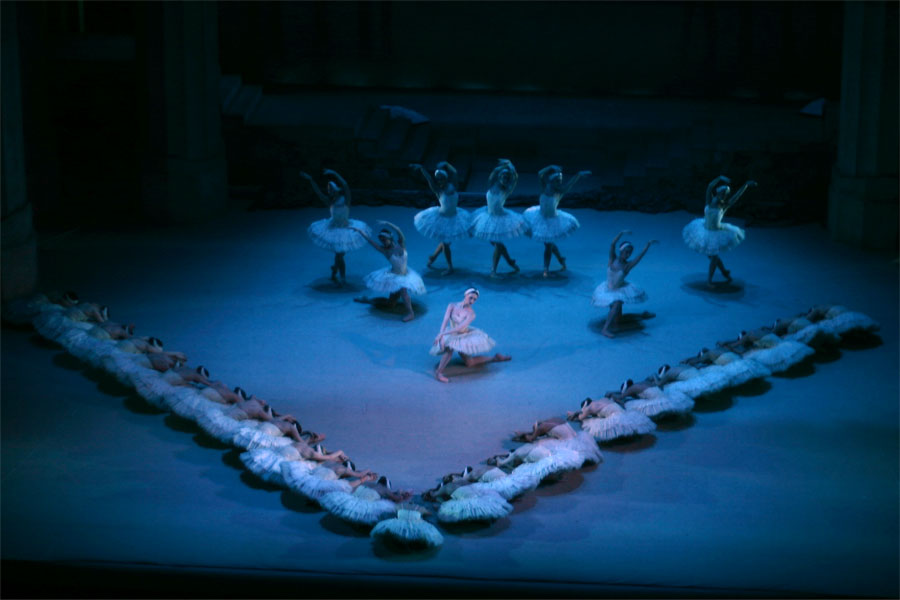
Scene from act 4; Vienna State Opera, 2004

Odette is distraught. The swan maidens try to comfort her. Siegfried returns to the lake and makes a passionate apology. She forgives him, but his betrayal cannot be undone. Rather than remain a swan forever, she chooses to die. He chooses to die with her and they leap into the lake, where they will stay together forever. This breaks Rothbart's spell over the swan maidens, causing him to lose his power over them and he dies. In an apotheosis, they, who transform back into regular maidens, watch as Siegfried and Odette ascend into the Heavens together, forever united in love.

=== 1877 libretto synopsis ===
==== Act 1 ====
Prince Siegfried, his friends, and a group of peasants are celebrating his coming of age. His mother arrives to inform him she wishes for him to marry soon so she may make sure he does not disgrace their family line by his marriage. She has organized a ball where he is to choose his bride from among the daughters of the nobility. After the celebration, he and his friend, Benno, spot a flock of flying swans and decide to hunt them.

==== Act 2 ====
Siegfried and Benno track the swans to a lake, but they vanish. A woman wearing a crown appears and meets them. She tells them her name is Odette and she was one of the swans they were hunting. She tells them her story: her mother, a good fairy, had married a knight, but she died and he remarried. Odette's stepmother is a witch who wanted to kill her, but her grandfather saved her. He had cried so much over her mother's death, he created the lake with his tears. She and her companions live in it with him, and can transform themselves into swans whenever they wish. Her stepmother still wants to kill her and stalks her in the form of an owl, but she has a crown which protects her from harm. When she gets married, her stepmother will lose the power to harm her. Siegfried falls in love with her but she fears her stepmother will ruin their happiness.

==== Act 3 ====
Several young noblewomen dance at Siegfried's ball, but he refuses to marry any of them. Baron von Rothbart and his daughter, Odile, arrive. Siegfried thinks Odile looks like Odette, but Benno does not agree. He dances with her as he grows more and more enamored of her, and eventually agrees to marry her. At that moment, Rothbart transforms into a demon, Odile laughs, and a white swan wearing a crown appears in the window. Siegfried runs out of the castle.

==== Act 4 ====
In tears, Odette tells her friends Siegfried did not keep his vow of love. Seeing him coming, they leave and urge her to go with them, but she wants to see him one last time. A storm begins. He enters and begs her for forgiveness. She refuses and attempts to leave. He snatches the crown from her head and throws it in the lake, saying, "Willing or unwilling, you will always remain with me!" The owl flies overhead, carrying the crown away. "What have you done? I am dying!" Odette says, and falls into his arms. The lake rises from the storm and drowns them. The storm quiets, and a group of swans appear on the lake.

=== Alternative endings ===
Many different endings exist, ranging from romantic to tragic.

- In 1950, Konstantin Sergeyev staged a new Swan Lake for the Mariinsky Ballet (then the Kirov) after Petipa and Ivanov, but included some bits of Vaganova and Gorsky. Under the Soviet regime, the tragic ending was replaced with a happy one, so in the Mariinsky and Bolshoi versions, Odette and Siegfried lived happily ever after.
- In the version danced today by the Mariinsky Ballet, the ending is one of a "happily ever after" in which Siegfried fights Rothbart and tears off his wing, killing him. Odette is restored to human form and she and Siegfried are happily united. This version has often been used by Russian and Chinese ballet companies.
- In the 1966 version Rudolf Nureyev choreographed for the Vienna State Ballet, Rothbart takes Odette away and leaves Siegfried to drown in the storm he created, leaving Odette in captivity.
- In the 1986 version Rudolf Nureyev choreographed for the Paris Opera Ballet, Rothbart fights with Siegfried, who is overcome and dies, leaving Rothbart to take Odette triumphantly up to the Heavens.
- In the 1988 Dutch National Ballet production, choreographed by Rudi van Dantzig, Siegfried realized he cannot save Odette from the curse, so he drowns himself. His friend, Alexander, finds his body and carries him.
- In the 1988 version of the London Festival Ballet, Odette dies in Siegfried's arms, who carries her to the lake, where they both drown themselves. This breaks the curse and they are united in death.
- Although the 1969 Bolshoi Ballet production by Yury Grigorovich contained a happy ending similar to the Mariinsky Ballet version, the 2001 revision changed the ending to a tragic one. Siegfried is defeated in a confrontation with the Evil Genius, who seizes Odette and takes her away to parts unknown before the lovers can unite, and Siegfried is left by himself at the lake. The major-key rendition of the main leitmotif and the remainder of the Apotheosis (retained in the 1969 production) are replaced with a modified, transposed repeat of the Introduction followed by the final few bars of No. 10/No. 14, closing the ballet on a dour note.
- In a version which has an ending very close to the 1895 Mariinsky revival, danced by American Ballet Theatre starting in 2000 (with a video recording published in 2005), Siegfried's mistaken pledge of fidelity to Odile consigns Odette to remain a swan forever. After realizing her last moment of humanity is at hand, Odette throws herself into the lake, killing herself. Siegfried follows her to his death. This act of sacrifice and love breaks Rothbart's power, and he is destroyed. In the final tableau, the lovers are seen rising together to Heaven in apotheosis.
- In a version danced by New York City Ballet in 2006 (with choreography by Peter Martins after Lev Ivanov, Marius Petipa, and George Balanchine), Siegfried's declaration he wishes to marry Odile constitutes a betrayal that condemns Odette to remain a swan forever. She is called away into swan form, and Siegfried is left alone in grief as the curtain falls.
- In the 2006 version by Stanton Welch for Houston Ballet, also based upon Petipa and Ivanov, the last scene has Siegfried attempting to kill Rothbart with his crossbow, but he misses and hits Odette instead. She falls, Rothbart's spell now broken, and regains human form. Siegfried embraces her as she dies, then carries her body into the lake, where he also drowns himself.
- In the 2006 version by Michael Pink for Milwaukee Ballet, Rothbart stabs Odette before Siegfried's eyes. Odette mortally wounded, is carried to the lake by Siegfried where they drown themselves. Their love defeats both Rothbart and Odile. As in the 1895 Mariinsky revival, the apotheosis reveals the lovers reunited in death.
- In a version danced by San Francisco Ballet in 2009, Siegfried and Odette throw themselves into the lake, as in the 1895 Mariinsky revival, and Rothbart is destroyed. Two swans, implied to be the lovers, are then seen flying past the Moon.
- In a version danced by National Ballet of Canada in 2010, Odette forgives Siegfried for his betrayal and the promise of reconciliation shines momentarily before Rothbart summons forth a violent storm. He and Siegfried struggle. When the storm subsides, Odette is left alone to mourn the dead Siegfried.
- In the 2012 version performed at Blackpool Grand Theatre by the Russian State Ballet of Siberia, Siegfried drags Rothbart into the lake and they both drown. Odette is left as a swan.
- In the 2015 English National Ballet version My First Swan Lake, specifically recreated for young children, the power of Siegfried and Odette's love enables the other swans to rise up and defeat Rothbart, who falls to his death. This breaks the curse, and Siegfried and Odette live happily ever after. This is like the Mariinsky Ballet's "happily ever after" endings. In a new production in 2018, Odile helps Siegfried and Odette in the end. Rothbart, who is Odile's brother in this production, is forgiven and he gives up his evil power. Odette and Siegfried live happily ever after and stay friends with Rothbart and Odile.
- In Hübbe and Schandorff's 2015 and 2016 Royal Danish Ballet production, Siegfried is forced by Rothbart to marry Odile, after condemning Odette to her curse as a swan forever by mistakenly professing his love to Odile.
- In the 2018 Royal Ballet version, Siegfried rescues Odette from the lake, but she turns out to be dead, even though the spell is broken. The pre-2018 versions do not have this ending, only the 1895 ending.
- In David Hallberg's 2023 Australian Ballet version, Odette makes an irrevocable promise to von Rothbart, vowing eternal obedience in order to save Siegfried. Triumphantly, Rothbart takes Odette away from Siegfried. Alone in his grief, Siegfried throws himself off a cliff and dies.

== Structure ==
Tchaikovsky's original score (including additions for the original 1877 production), which differs from the score as revised by Riccardo Drigo for the revival of Petipa and Ivanov that is still used by most ballet companies, corresponds to this layout. The titles for each number are from the original published score. Some of the numbers are titled simply as musical indications, those that are not are translated from their original French titles.

=== Act 1 ===
Introduction: Moderato assai – Allegro non-troppo – Tempo I

Extract from Act 1
No. 2 Waltz
Played by the Ballet Française Symphony Orchestra

No. 1 Scène: Allegro giusto
No. 2 Waltz: Tempo di valse
No. 3 Scène: Allegro moderato
No. 4 Pas de trois

1. Intrada (or Entrée): Allegro
2. Andante sostenuto
3. Allegro semplice, Presto
4. Moderato
5. Allegro
6. Coda: Allegro vivace

No. 5 Pas de deux for Two Merry-makers (later fashioned into the Black Swan Pas de Deux)

1. Tempo di valse ma non troppo vivo, quasi moderato
2. Andante – Allegro
3. Tempo di valse
4. Coda: Allegro molto vivace

No. 6 Pas d'action: Andantino quasi moderato – Allegro
No. 7 Sujet (Introduction to the Dance with Goblets)
No. 8 Dance with Goblets: Tempo di polacca
No. 9 Finale: Sujet, Andante

=== Act 2 ===
Extract from Act 2
No. 13 Dance of the Little Swans
Played by the Ballet Française Symphony Orchestra

No. 10 Scène: Moderato
No. 11 Scène: Allegro moderato, Moderato, Allegro vivo
No. 12 Scène: Allegro, Moderato assai quasi andante
No. 13 Dances of the Swans

1. Tempo di valse
2. Moderato assai
3. Tempo di valse
4. Allegro moderato (later the famous Dance of the Little Swans)
5. Pas d'action: Andante, Andante non-troppo, Allegro (material borrowed from Undina)
6. Tempo di valse
7. Coda: Allegro vivo

No. 14 Scène: Moderato

=== Act 3 ===
Extract from Act 3
No. 20 Hungarian Dance
Played by the Ballet Française Symphony Orchestra

No. 15 Scène: March – Allegro giusto
No. 16 Ballabile: Dance of the Corps de Ballet and the Dwarves: Moderato assai, Allegro vivo
No. 17 Entrance of the Guests and Waltz: Allegro, Tempo di valse
No. 18 Scène: Allegro, Allegro giusto
No. 19 Pas de six

1. Intrada (or Entrée): Moderato assai
2. Variation I: Allegro
3. Variation II: Andante con moto (although titled as a variation, this number was likely meant to follow the Intrada and serve as the central Grande adage of the Pas de six after the Intrada but either composed to be out of sequence and published as such after the first variation)
4. Variation III: Moderato
5. Variation IV: Allegro
6. Variation V: Moderato, Allegro semplice
7. Grand Coda: Allegro molto

Appendix I – Pas de deux pour Mme. Anna Sobeshchanskaya (Note: Pas de deux pour Mme. Anna Sobeshchanskaya (original music composed by Ludwig Minkus, adapted by Tchaikovsky. Choreographed in 1953 by George Balanchine as the Tchaikovsky Pas de deux). Madame Sobeshchanskaya was, apparently, pleased. For more than seventy years, this pas de deux was forgotten. Because it was a later composition, it was not published as part of Tchaikovsky's score and was thought to have been lost. The orchestral partition was accidentally rediscovered in 1953 among the orchestral parts for Alexander Gorsky's early 20th century production of the ballet Le Corsaire. It soon came to the attention of George Balanchine, who successfully sought permission to use it for his own choreography.)

1. Andante
2. Variation I: Allegro moderato
3. Variation II: Allegro
4. Coda: Allegro molto vivace

No. 20 Hungarian Dance: Czardas – Moderato assai, Allegro moderato, Vivace
Appendix II – No. 20a Danse russe pour Mlle. Pelageya Karpakova: Moderato, Andante semplice, Allegro vivo, Presto
No. 21 Danse Espagnole: Allegro non-troppo (Tempo di bolero)
No. 22 Danse Napolitaine: Allegro moderato, Andantino quasi moderato, Presto
No. 23 Mazurka: Tempo di mazurka
No. 24 Scène: Allegro, Tempo di valse, Allegro vivo

=== Act 4 ===
Extract from Act 4
No. 29 Scène Finale
Played by the London Philharmonic Orchestra

Act IV No.29 Scène Finale
Extract from Act IV
Played by the Russian State Symphony Orchestra

No. 25 Entr'acte: Moderato
No. 26 Scène: Allegro non-troppo
No. 27 Dance of the Little Swans: Moderato
No. 28 Scène: Allegro agitato, Molto meno mosso, Allegro vivace
No. 29 Scène finale: Andante, Allegro, Alla breve, Moderato e maestoso, Moderato

== Later adaptations and references ==
=== Live-action film ===
- The opening credits for the first sound version of Dracula (1931) starring Bela Lugosi includes a modified version of the Swan Theme from act 2. The same piece was later used for the credits of The Mummy (1932) as well as Murders in the Rue Morgue (1932) and is often used as a backing track for the silent film, The Phantom of the Opera (1925).
- The film I Was an Adventuress (1940) includes a long sequence from the ballet.
- The documentary World Assembly of Youth features the New York City Ballet performing Black Swan at Cornell University in Ithaca, New York in August 1951
- El lago de los cisnes (1953) is a short film directed by Francisco Rovira Beleta and shot at the Gran Teatre del Liceu in Barcelona, featuring the participation of the International London Ballet. It is a screen adaptation of only the first two acts of the ballet.
- Mastera russkogo baleta (1953) is an episodic film directed by Herbert Rappaport that presents cinematic adaptations of three famous ballets, the first of which is Swan Lake, with Galina Ulanova in the role of Odette.
- Lebedinoe ozero (1957) is a ballet film choreographed by Asaf Messerer and directed by Zoja Tulub'eva, starring Maya Plisetskaya in the role of Odette.
- The plot of the 1965 British comedy film The Intelligence Men reaches its climax at a performance of the ballet, with an assassination attempt on the ballerina portraying Odette.
- The 1966 American political thriller film Torn Curtain directed by Alfred Hitchcock and starring Paul Newman and Julie Andrews contains a scene from the ballet Swan Lake. The lead couple of the film, played by Newman and Andrews, are escaping from East Berlin during the Cold War and attend a performance of the ballet as part of their escape plan. They are spotted and reported to the police by the lead ballerina (Tamara Toumanova) during the ballet performance. Their dramatic escape from the theatre during the ballet is a high point of the film.
- In 1968–69, the Kirov Ballet along with Lenfilm studios produced Lebedinoe ozero, a filmed version of the ballet starring Yelena Yevteyeva as Odette.
- In the film Funny Girl (1968), Barbra Streisand, playing Fanny Brice, dances in a comedic spoof of Swan Lake.
- In the film A Woman Under The Influence (1974), Gena Rowlands, Mabel Longhetti dances in the garden with her children to Swan Lake and later hums the melody.
- The ballet is central to the plot of Étoile (1989).
- In Brain Donors (1992), the three main characters try and succeed in sabotaging a fictional production of the ballet.
- The 1998 Czech fantasy film Jezerní královna directed by Václav Vorlíček is a loose adaptation of the Swan Lake story. Odette (played by Jitka Schneiderová) is one of seven princesses kidnapped by the eponymous Queen of the Lake (Ivana Chýlková) to be her slaves, dancing for her underwater and transforming into swans on the surface.
- Darren Aronofsky's Black Swan (2010) focuses on two characters from Swan Lake-the Princess Odette, sometimes called the White Swan, and her evil duplicate, the witch Odile (the Black Swan), and takes its inspiration from the ballet's story, although it does not literally follow it. Clint Mansell's score contains music from the ballet, with more elaborate restructuring to fit the horror tone of the film.
- In Of Gods and Men (2011), the climactic Swan Lake music is played at the monks' Last Supper-reminiscent dinner.
- In the film T-34, music from Swan Lake could be heard while the main characters test-drive a captured T-34 for the Germans and pulling off ballet-style moves with the tank.
- As of August 2020, a live-action adaptation of the ballet is being produced by Mandeville Films, written by Olivier Award-winning playwright Jessica Swale and starring Felicity Jones with Universal Pictures set to distribute.
- The end of the ballet is in the film The Courier (2020).
- The ballet is referenced in the film Fast X (2023) by Jason Momoa's character Dante.

=== Animated theatrical and direct-to-video productions ===
- Swan Lake, episode 60 of the Japanese anthology series Manga Fairy Tales of the World (1976–1979), produced by Dax International.
- Swan Lake (1981) is a feature-length anime produced by the Japanese company Toei Animation and directed by Koro Yabuki. The adaptation uses Tchaikovsky's score and remains relatively faithful to the story. Two separate English dubs were made, one featuring regular voice actors, and one using celebrities as the main principals (Pam Dawber as Odette, Christopher Atkins as Siegfried, David Hemmings as Rothbart, and Kay Lenz as Odile). The second dub was recorded at Golden Sync Studios and aired on American Movie Classics in December 1990 and The Disney Channel in January 1994. It was presently distributed in the United States by The Samuel Goldwyn Company. It was also distributed in France and the United Kingdom by Rouge Citron Production.
- Swan Lake (1994) is a 28-minute traditional two-dimensional animation narrated by Dudley Moore. It is one of five animations in the Storyteller's Classics series. Like the 1981 version, it also uses Tchaikovsky's music throughout and is quite faithful to the original story. What sets it apart is the climactic scene, in which the prince swims across the lagoon towards Rothbart's castle to rescue Odette, who is being held prisoner there. Rothbart points his finger at the prince and zaps him to turn him into a duck – but then, the narrator declares, "Sometimes, even magic can go very, very wrong." After a moment, the duck turns into an eagle and flies into Rothbart's castle, where the prince resumes his human form and engages Rothbart in battle. This animation was produced by Madman Movies for Castle Communications. The director was Chris Randall, the producer was Bob Burrows, the production co-ordinator was Lesley Evans and the executive producers were Terry Shand and Geoff Kempin. The music was performed by the Moscow State Orchestra. It was shown on TVOntario in December 1997 and was distributed on home video in North America by Castle Vision International, Orion Home Video and J.L. Bowerbank & Associates.
- The Swan Princess (1994) is a Nest Entertainment film based on the Swan Lake story. It stays fairly close to the original story, but does contain many differences. For example, instead of the Swan Maidens, we have the addition of sidekicks Puffin the puffin, Speed the tortoise, and Jean-Bob the frog. Several of the characters are renamed – Prince Derek instead of Siegfried, his friend Bromley instead of Benno and his tutor Rogers instead of Wolfgang; Derek's mother is named Queen Uberta. Another difference is Odette and Derek knowing each other from when they were children, which introduces us to Odette's father, King William and explains how and why Odette is kidnapped by Rothbart. The character Odile is replaced by an old hag (unnamed in this movie, but known as Bridget in the sequels), as Rothbart's sidekick until the end. Also, this version contains a happy ending, allowing both Odette and Derek to survive as humans once Rothbart is defeated. It has eleven sequels, Escape from Castle Mountain (1997), The Mystery of the Enchanted Treasure (1998), Christmas (2012), A Royal Family Tale (2014), Princess Tomorrow, Pirate Today (2016), Royally Undercover (2017), A Royal MyZtery (2018), Kingdom of Music (2019), A Royal Wedding (2020), A Fairytale is Born (2023), and Far Longer than Forever (2023) which deviate even further from the ballet. None of the films contain Tchaikovsky's music.
- Barbie of Swan Lake (2003) is a direct-to-video children's movie featuring Tchaikovsky's music and motion capture from the New York City Ballet and based on the Swan Lake story. In this version, Odette is not a princess by birth, but a baker's daughter; instead of being kidnapped by Rothbart and taken to the lake against her will, she discovers the Enchanted Forest when she willingly follows a unicorn there. She is also made into a more dominant heroine in this version, as she is declared as the one who is destined to save the forest from Rothbart's clutches when she frees a magic crystal. Another difference is the addition of new characters, such as Rothbart's cousin the Fairy Queen, Lila the unicorn, Erasmus the troll, and the Fairy Queen's fairies and elves, who have also been turned into animals by Rothbart. These fairies and elves replace the Swan Maidens from the ballet. It is also the Fairy Queen's magic that allows Odette to return to her human form at night, not Rothbart's spell. Other changes include renaming the Prince Daniel and a happy ending, instead of the ballet's tragic ending. Like the 1877 production, Odette wears a magic crown that protects her.
- Barbie in the Pink Shoes (2013) features an adaptation of Swan Lake amongst its many fairytales.
- In the animated series Ever After High there is Duchess Swan, which is the daughter of Princess Odette and Prince Siegfried.

=== Computer/video games ===
- The 1988 NES video game Final Fantasy II used a minor portion of Swan Lake just before fighting the Lamia Queen boss. In the WonderSwan Color and later versions the portion is longer.
- The 1990 LucasArts adventure game Loom used a major portion of the Swan Lake suite for its audio track, as well as incorporating a major swan theme into the storyline. It otherwise bore no resemblance to the original ballet.
- The 1991 DMA Design puzzle game Lemmings used "Dance of the Little Swans" in its soundtrack.
- The 1993 Treasure platform game McDonald's Treasure Land Adventure uses a portion of Swan Lake as background music for one of its levels.
- The 2008 Nintendo DS game Imagine Ballet Star contains a shortened version of Swan Lake. The main character, who is directly controlled by the player of the game, dances to three shortened musical pieces from Swan Lake. Two of the pieces are solos and the third piece is a pas de deux.
- The 2009 SEGA video game Mario & Sonic at the Olympic Winter Games includes Swan Lake in its figure skating competition.
- The 2015 game Five Nights at Freddy's 3 contains a music box version of a piece from Swan Lake.
- The 2016 DEVSISTERS game Cookie Run: OvenBreak features Sugar Swan Cookie, who is based on Odette, and Black Sugar Swan Cookie, who is based on Odile, as playable characters.
- The 2016 Blizzard Entertainment game Overwatch contains two unlockable costumes for the character Widowmaker based on Odette and Odile.
- The 2020 Nintendo Switch game Paper Mario: The Origami King features a comedic ballet production of the song, as well as a punk remix.
- The 2020 action role-playing game Genshin Impact features Odette Spessiva (named after Princess Odette from Swan Lake) as a playable character, who is a prima ballerina from Snezhnaya's Korolevskiy Troupe.
- The 2021 DEVSISTERS game Cookie Run: Kingdom features Sugar Swan Cookie, who is based on Odette, after her release in the game's predecessor, Cookie Run: OvenBreak.
- The 2022 game Signalis contains a cassette tape the player can find that plays a section of Swan Lake.
- The 2023 rhythm game Just Dance 2024 Edition features a remix of the song.

=== Dance ===
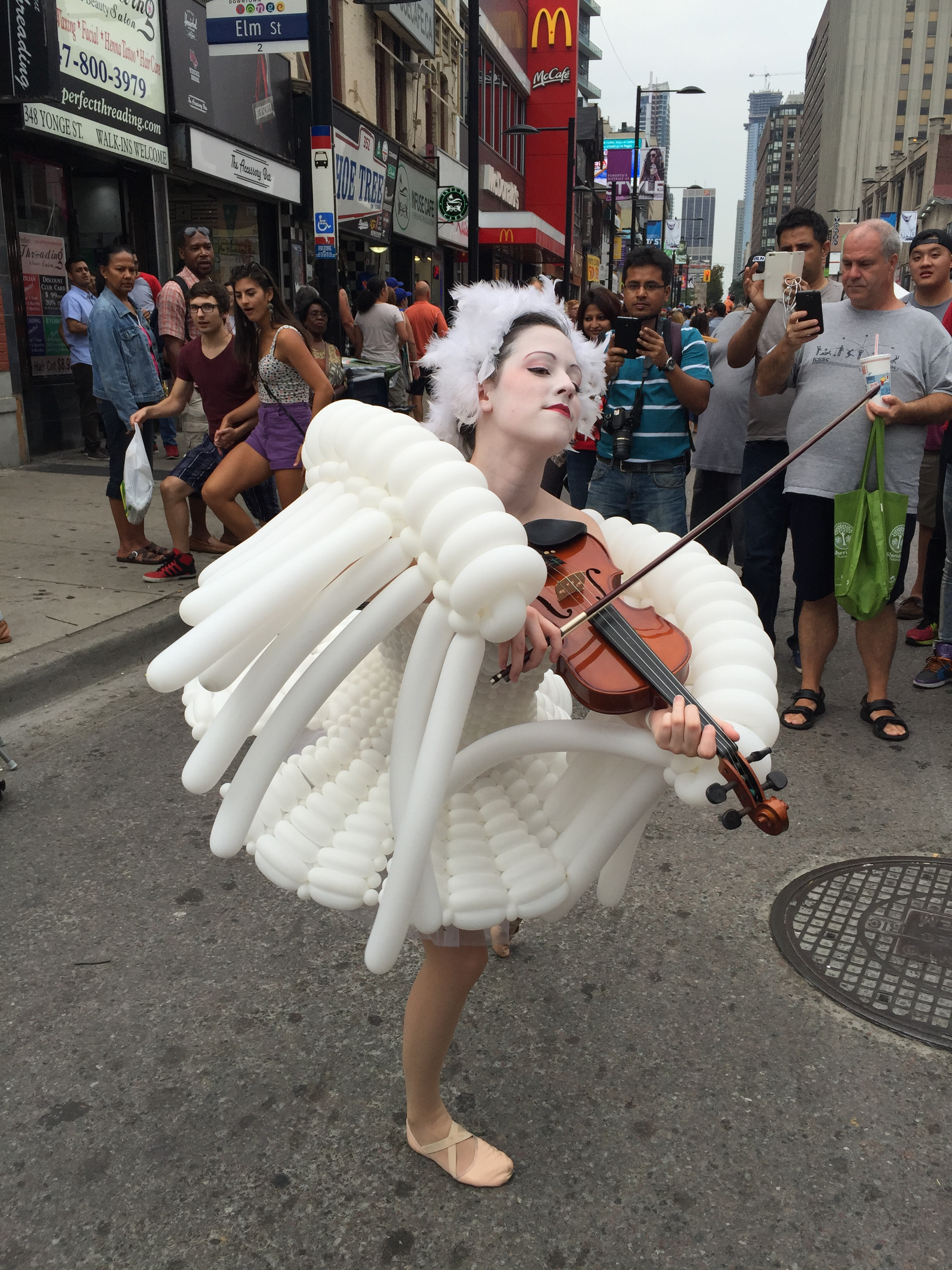
The Silent Violinist, a professional mime busker act, that references the "swan princess" concept.

- The Swedish dancer/choreographer Fredrik Rydman has produced a modern dance/street dance interpretation of the ballet entitled Swan Lake Reloaded. It depicts the "swans" as heroin addict prostitutes who are kept in place by Rothbart, their pimp. The production's music uses themes and melodies from Tchaikovsky's score and incorporates them into hip-hop and techno tunes.

=== Literature ===
- Amiri & Odette (2009) is a verse retelling by Walter Dean Myers with illustrations by Javaka Steptoe. Myers sets the story in the Swan Lake Projects of a large city. Amiri is a basketball-playing "Prince of the Night", a champion of the asphalt courts in the park. Odette belongs to Big Red, a dealer, a power on the streets.
- The Black Swan (1999) is a fantasy novel written by Mercedes Lackey that re-imagines the original story and focuses heavily on Odile. Rothbart's daughter is a sorceress in her own right who comes to sympathise with Odette.
- The Sorcerer's Daughter (2003) is a fantasy novel by Irina Izmailova, a retelling of the ballet's plot. The boyish and careless Siegfried consciously prefers the gentle, equally childlike Odile, while the stern and proud Odette is from the very beginning attracted to Rothbart (who later turns out to be the kingdom's rightful monarch in hiding).
- Swan Lake (1989) is a children's novel written by Mark Helprin and illustrated by Chris Van Allsburg, which re-creates the original story as a tale about political strife in an unnamed Eastern European country. In it, Odette becomes a princess hidden from birth by the puppetmaster (and eventually usurper) behind the throne, with the story being retold to her child.

=== Music ===
- British instrumental band The Cougars had a #33 UK hit with the single "Saturday Nite at the Duck-Pond", which used music from Swan Lake by Pyotr Ilyich Tchaikovsky. The song achieved some notoriety for being banned by the BBC. The reason for the ban was reported in the musical press, saying Saturday Nite At The Duck Pond was "a travesty of a major classical work".
- Japanese instrumental rock group Takeshi Terauchi & Bunnys recorded this on their 1967 album, Let's Go Unmei.
- Belgian band Wallace Collection quote from Act 2 Scene 10 in their track "Daydream" (1969).
- British ska band Madness featured a ska version in 1979 on their debut album One Step Beyond...
- British post-punk band Public Image Ltd's 1979 single Death Disco borrows elements of the main theme. The track appears on their 1979 album Metal Box under the title Swan Lake.
- South Korean group Shinhwa re-imagines the main theme into a hip-hop k-pop song "T.O.P. (Twinkling of Paradise)" (1999)
- Los Angeles group Sweetbox uses the main theme for the chorus of their song "Superstar" from the 2001 album Classified.
- German singer Jeanette Biedermann uses the Swan Lake melody structure for her 2001 single release "How It's Got To Be".
- Spanish symphonic metal band Dark Moor borrows elements on the song "Swan Lake", the first track of their 2009 album Autumnal.
- A reggae version of the Swan Lake ballet appears on the 2017 album Classical Made Modern 3.
- Canadian metal band The Agonist has made an a cappella version of act 2's "Scène. Moderato", which is included in their second studio album, Lullabies for the Dormant Mind.
- Beyoncé uses the ballet's famous theme in her "visual album" Lemonade, a reference that underscores the film's meditation on infidelity.
- Scott Hamilton – Tenor Saxophone. Jazz interpretation – Scott Hamilton CLASSICS
- X Japan uses a short excerpt of it in "Silent Jealousy".

=== Musicals/opera ===
- Odette – The Dark Side of Swan Lake, a musical written by Alexander S. Bermange and Murray Woodfield, was staged at the Bridewell Theatre, London in October 2007.
- In Radio City Christmas Spectacular, The Rockettes do a short homage to Swan Lake during the performance of the "Twelve Days of Christmas (Rock and Dance Version)", with the line "Seven Swans A-Swimming".
- Billy Elliot the Musical incorporates the most famous section of Matthew Bourne's Swan Lake in a dance number, in which the main character dances while shadowed by his future, adult self.
- The musical Anastasia includes a scene in which several of the main characters attend a performance of Swan Lake in Paris near the show's climax. The four characters sing about their inner conflicts and desires as Tchaikovsky's score blends into the musical's melodies, the dancers onstage representing both the ballet's characters and the thoughts of each singer in turn.
- The top of the third act of the opera The Abduction of Figaro (1984) includes a parody of Swan Lake where Odile is portrayed as a Carmen Miranda character.

=== Television ===
- The story was adapted in 1977 in the episode "Swan Lake" of the anime anthology series Manga Fairy Tales of the World. The opening title card cites a German folktale as its source, but in fact the episode follows the libretto quite faithfully and even uses Tchaikovsky's music.
- During the era of the Soviet Union, Soviet state television preempted large announcements with video recordings of Swan Lake on four infamous occasions. In 1982 state television broadcast recordings following the death of Leonid Brezhnev. In 1984 recordings preempted the announcement of the death of Yuri Andropov. In 1985, recordings preempted the announcement of the death of General Secretary Konstantin Chernenko. The final and most oft-cited instance of the use of Swan Lake in this context was during the August 1991 Soviet coup attempt leading up to the dissolution of the Soviet Union.
- When independent Russian news channel TV Rain was forced to shut down due to censorship laws caused by the 2022 Russian invasion of Ukraine, the station chose to end its final newscast with Swan Lake in a reference to its use in 1991.
- Princess Tutu (2002) is an anime television series whose heroine, Duck, wears a costume reminiscent of Odette's. She is a duck transformed by a writer into a girl (rather than the other way around), while her antagonist, Rue, dressed as Odile, is a girl who had been raised to believe she is a raven. Other characters include Mytho in the role of Siegfried, who is even referred to by this name towards the end of the second act, and Drosselmeyer playing in the role of Rothbart. The score of Swan Lake, along with that of The Nutcracker, is used throughout, as is, occasionally, the Petipa choreography, most notably in episode 13, where Duck dances the climactic pas de deux alone, complete with failed lifts and catches.
- In the second season of the anime Kaleido Star, a circus adaptation of Swan Lake becomes one of the Kaleido Stage's most important and successful shows. Main character Sora Naegino plays Princess Odette, with characters Leon Oswald as Prince Siegfried and May Wong as Odile.
- In episode 213 of The Muppet Show, Rudolf Nureyev performs Swine Lake with a giant ballerina pig.
- In episode 105 of Cagney and Lacey, Det. Chris Cagney went to this with her boyfriend and hated it so that she fell asleep in the second act.
- Swan Lake was heard in two episodes of the Playhouse Disney series Little Einsteins: "Quincy and the Magic Instruments" and "The Blue Footed Boobey Bird Ballet".
- In the Tiny Toon Adventures episode Loon Lake, Babs Bunny helps out Shirley the Loon after she was ridiculed by a group of snobbish swans in ballet class while preparing for a performance of Swan Lake.
- In Dexter's Laboratory episode, Deedeemensional, Dexter, in order to deliver an important message to his future self, was forced to dance Swan Lake with Dee Dee and her future self.
- The Beavis and Butt-Head episode "A Very Special Episode" uses the same arrangement used in Dracula and The Mummy while Beavis is feeding the bird he saved.
- In the animated children's show Wonder Pets, Linny, Tuck and Ming-Ming help encourage a baby swan to dance in his own way. The music of Swan Lake is used.
- In the animated Spanish children's animated show Sandra the Fairytale Detective, the episode "The Princess of the Lake" is about Sandra and Fo help Prince Siegfried to rescue the Princess Odette from the evil sorcerer.
- A close arrangement of the waltz from act 1 appears in episodes 16, 23 and 78 of My Little Pony: Friendship Is Magic, "Sonic Rainboom", "The Cutie Mark Chronicles" and "Simple Ways".
- In one of the Shimmer and Shine episodes called "The Great Ballet". Swan Lake was seen in this episode.
- In one of the Madagascar: A Little Wild episodes called "Hippo Lake". It has a bunch of Swan Lake references from this episode.
- Das Märchen vom Schwanensee (2025), a German television film from the Sechs auf einen Streich series.

== Symbolism ==
In the 2020s, Swan Lake became a symbol of protest in Russia. The symbolism dates to the failed Soviet coup of 1991. On August 19 of that year, as tanks rolled into Moscow, state television aired the entire ballet on loop. Communist hardliners then announced that they had seized control of the country from Mikhail Gorbachev, whom they had arrested. Boris Yeltsin responded by climbing on a tank in central Moscow and urging citizens to turn out in protest. For three days, thousands of protesters stood off the army, after which the coup leaders relented. Within four months, the Soviet Union was gone.

In 1991, there was a tradition of interrupting regular programming by airing the ballet on loop when the government was in crisis: it happened with the death of Leonid Brezhnev in 1982, while a successor was selected, and again with the deaths of Yuri Andropov in 1984 and Konstantin Chernenko in 1985. Swan Lake thus became "a sign of political instability and upheaval."

== Selected discography ==
=== Audio ===
Year	Conductor	Orchestra	
1954	Antal Doráti	Minneapolis Symphony Orchestra	first complete recording, late 1953, mastered originally in mono only; some mock-stereo issues released on LP
1959	Ernest Ansermet	Orchestre de la Suisse Romande	taped in stereo Oct–Nov. 1958, abridged
1974	Anatole Fistoulari	Radio Filharmonisch Orkest	with Ruggiero Ricci, violin
1976	André Previn	London Symphony Orchestra	with Ida Haendel, violin
1977	Richard Bonynge	National Philharmonic Orchestra	with Mincho Minchev, violin
1979	Seiji Ozawa	Boston Symphony Orchestra	with Joseph Silverstein, violin
1982	John Lanchbery	Philharmonia Orchestra	
1988	Yevgeny Svetlanov	Russian State Symphony Orchestra	
1990	Michael Tilson Thomas	London Symphony Orchestra	
1992	Charles Dutoit	Montreal Symphony Orchestra	
2006	Valery Gergiev	Orchestra of the Mariinsky Theatre	
2013	Neeme Järvi	Bergen Philharmonic Orchestra	with James Ehnes, violin: a multi-channel SACD recording
2018	Vladimir Jurowski	State Academic Symphony Orchestra of the Russian Federation	1877 version

=== Video ===
Year	Conductor	Ballet	Siegfried	Odette / Odile
1957	Yuri Fayer	Bolshoi Ballet	Nikolai Fadeyechev	Maya Plisetskaya
1966	John Lanchbery	Vienna State Ballet	Rudolf Nureyev	Margot Fonteyn
1968	Viktor Fedotov	Kirov Ballet	John Markovsky	Yelena Yevteyeva
1976	Algis Zhuraitis	Bolshoi Ballet	Alexander Bogatirev	Maya Plisetskaya
1980	Ashley Lawrence	The Royal Ballet	Anthony Dowell	Natalia Makarova
1984	Algis Zhuraitis	Bolshoi Ballet	Alexander Bogatirev	Natalia Bessmertnova
1986	Viktor Fedotov	Kirov Ballet	Konstantin Zaklinsky	Galina Mezentseva
1988	Graham Bond	English National Ballet	Peter Schaufuss	Evelyn Hart
1989	Algis Zhuraitis	Bolshoi Ballet	Yuri Vasyuchenko	Alla Mikhalchenko
1990	Viktor Fedotov	Kirov Ballet	Igor Zelensky	Yulia Makhalina
1992	Alexander Sotnikov	Perm Theatre Ballet	Alexei Fadeyechev	Nina Ananiashvili
1992	Jonathan Darlington	Paris Opera Ballet	Patrick Dupond	Marie-Claude Pietragalla
1996	Michel Quéval	Royal Swedish Ballet	Anders Nordström	Nathalie Nordquist
1998	Daniel Barenboim	Berlin State Ballet	Oliver Matz	Steffi Scherzer
2004	James Tuggle	La Scala Theatre Ballet	Roberto Bolle	Svetlana Zakharova
2005	Ormsby Wilkins	American Ballet Theatre	Ángel Corella	Gillian Murphy
2006	Vello Pähn	Paris Opera Ballet	Jose Martinez	Agnès Letestu
2007	Valery Gergiev	Mariinsky Ballet	Danila Korsuntsev	Ulyana Lopatkina
2009	Valeriy Ovsyanikov	The Royal Ballet	Thiago Soares	Marianela Núñez
2009	Vladimir Fedoseyev	Zurich Ballet	Stanislav Jermakov	Polina Semionova
2014	Alexander Ingram	Vienna State Ballet	Vladimir Shishov	Olga Esina
2015	Pavel Sorokin	Bolshoi Ballet	Denis Rodkin	Svetlana Zakharova
2015	Boris Gruzin	The Royal Ballet	Matthew Golding	Natalia Osipova
2018	Koen Kessels	The Royal Ballet	Vadim Muntagirov	Marianela Núñez
