= Steffi Scherzer =

German ballet dancer

- Born: 14 July 1957 (age 68); Stollberg, Germany
- Education: Staatliche Ballettschule, Berlin
- Occupations: Prima ballerina; Academic teacher
- Years active: 1975–present
- Organizations: Berlin State Opera; Zürcher Hochschule der Künste

Steffi Scherzer (born 14 July 1957) is a German ballet dancer, at the Berlin State Opera from 1975 to 2003, prima ballerina there from 1987, and director and instructor at the Tanz Akademie Zürich of the Zürcher Hochschule der Künste.

== Career ==
Scherzer was born in Stollberg. She was trained for seven years at the Staatliche Ballettschule in Berlin, by Martin Puttke, among others, East Germany's leading ballet teacher. She was engaged at the Deutsche Staatsoper (Berlin State Opera) in 1975, as a soloist from 1978, as Primaballerina in 1987.

Scherzer danced leading parts in classical and neo-classical ballets, also as an international guest dancer, collaborating with choreographers including Patrice Bart, Maurice Béjart, William Forsythe, Pierre Lacotte, Roland Petit and Uwe Scholz. She performed the title role in Tchaikovsky's Dornröschen (The Sleeping Beauty) with Rudolf Nureyev, and the double role Odette/Odile in Tchaikovsky's Schwanensee (Swan Lake) with Oliver Manz. One performance of Schwanensee, in a choreography by Patrice Bart, conducted by Daniel Barenboim, was filmed and shown live simultaneously in a cinema in Berlin and 100 cinemas in France. The production was filmed for TV in December 1998. She danced in William Forsythe's choreography of Steptext with partners Uwe Krotil, Ralf Stengel and Oliver Wulff. A reviewer noted: "Überragend Steffi Scherzer in rotem Trikot, die die extremen Körper- und Raumspannungen eindrucksvoll verkörpert." (Outstanding Steffi Scherzer in a red jersey, who embodies extreme physical and spatial tensions.) When Scherzer retired from the stage in 2003, she was named an honorary member of the Deutsche Staatsoper.

Scherzer and Matz have been teachers and directors of the Tanz Akademie Zürich of the Zürcher Hochschule der Künste from 2004, when they created the institute, which followed the "Schweizerische Ballettberufsschule" (Swiss ballet vocational school). Their students have earned prizes at competitions such as the International Ballet Competition in Cape Town.

Scherzer has served on the jury of international dance competitions such as the Youth America Grand Prix and Prix de Lausanne. She herself was awarded a bronze medal at the Varna International Ballet Competition and the special prize in Osaka in 1980.
