= Danse des petits cygnes =

Fourth movement of the 13th scene of Swan Lake, Act II

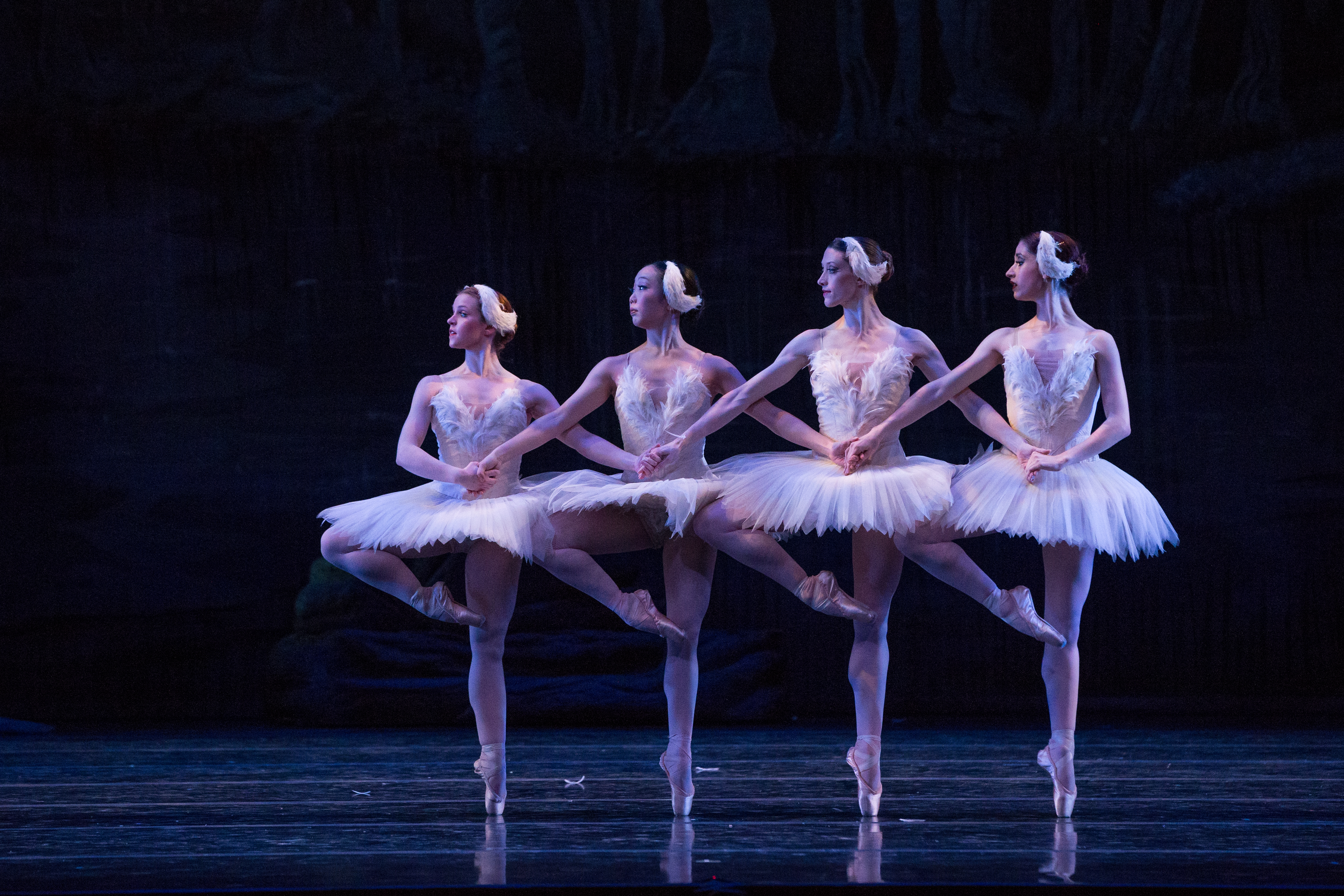
Dance of the Little Swans, performed by members of the Kansas City Ballet

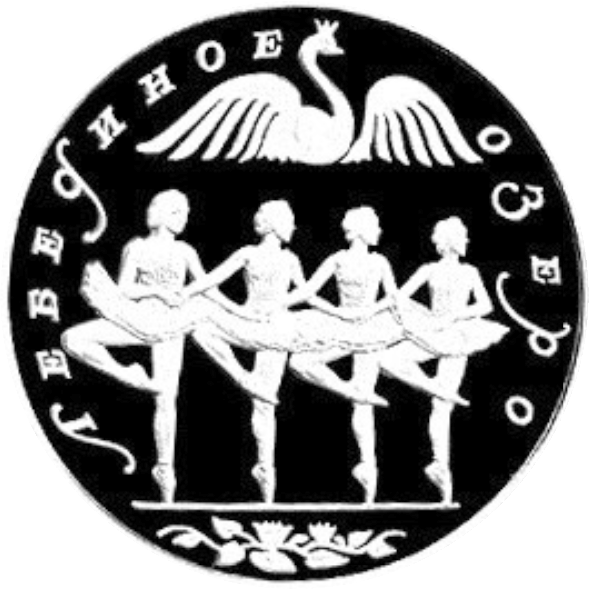
Silver commemorative coin issued by the Central Bank of Russia

Danse des petits cygnes is a dance from Tchaikovsky's Swan Lake, from the ballet's second act, the fourth movement of No. 13. It is written in the key of F♯ minor. Translated from French, it means "Dance of the Little Swans", also known as "Dance of the Cygnets". It is challenging because the dancers must coordinate their leg movements while holding hands.

Lev Ivanov's choreography—created for the 1895 revival of Swan Lake—was meant to imitate the way cygnets huddle and move together for protection. Four dancers enter the stage in a line and move across with their arms crossed in front of one another, grasping the next dancers' hands. They move sideways, doing sixteen pas de chat. Ideally, the dancers move in exact unison. At the very end, they break their chain and try to "fly", only to drop to the ground.

According to ballet writer Jean Battey Lewis in a 1997 NPR commentary the Little Swans are usually portrayed by unknown, up-and-coming dancers. Ironically, in view of the conformity required of the quartet, being cast as a Little Swan may be seen as a chance to be noticed and given more important roles.

An example of the comedic potential of this dance can be seen in the Morecambe and Wise film The Intelligence Men (1965).

The dance is also known as a pas de quatre.

== In popular culture ==
The segment is widely referenced and parodied in popular culture. A few instances:

- A 1960s black-and-white film of the Danse was played on Soviet state television and radio during the 1980s upon the deaths of Leonid Brezhnev, Konstantin Chernenko and Yuri Andropov, and again during the 1991 Soviet coup attempt. Since it came to signify a change in political leadership, it was later used as a protest against the Russian invasion of Ukraine in 2022.
- The first episode of Dexter's Laboratory has a parody involving Dexter and two DeeDees.
- In a scene in episode 26 ("Guilty or Not Guilty") of the British television sitcom Mind Your Language.
- The Taiwanese film The Pig, the Snake and the Pigeon features Lin Lu-ho playing it as his favorite music.
