= Julius Scherzer =

Romanian-born chemist

- Born: February 17, 1928; Chernivtsi, Romania
- Education: University of Bucharest
- Children: One
- Scientific career
- Fields: Inorganic chemistry
- Workplaces: University of Bucharest Unocal Co.

Julius Scherzer (born 17 February 1928) is a retired chemist. He has published two scientific-technical books, and two editions of an autobiography, along with dozens of scientific papers.

== Early life ==
Julius Scherzer was born on 17 February 1928, in Czernowitz, Romania, (the city that is now Chernivtsi, Ukraine). The son of an attorney, he grew up in a secular, German-speaking Jewish family. He attended grade school and first year middle school under the Romanians.

=== Life under foreign occupation ===
In 1940, after the takeover of the city by the Soviets (a result of the Hitler-Stalin pact), Scherzer attended one year of middle school under the Soviets. Following the invasion of the Soviet Union by the Germans and their fascists Romanian allies in 1941, Czernowitz came again under Romanian rule. Scherzer and his family (parents and sister) were forced into the city's ghetto, which they survived. After liberation by the Red Army in 1944, Julius finished middle- and high school under the Soviets.

== Education ==
After the war, in 1946, Scherzer and his family moved to Romania, and he enrolled in the Chemistry Department of the University of Bucharest. He was graduated from the university with a bachelor's degree in chemistry in 1951. In 1963, Scherzer got his PhD degree in inorganic-physical chemistry from the University of Bucharest.

In 1974, while working at the Research Division of the W.R. Grace Co., Scherzer got a master's degree in environmental science from Johns Hopkins University.

== Career ==
After receiving his bachelor's degree from the University of Bucharest, Scherzer began teaching and working on research in the university's chemistry department, specifically in the areas of inorganic and analytical chemistry. He did his first research work under professor Gheorghe Spacu, and went on to become the head of the laboratory. At the same time, Scherzer translated into Romanian Russian chemistry books and scientific articles for Editura Tehnica, a publisher of foreign scientific literature.

In 1963, Scherzer he moved to Vienna, Austria, where he did several months of post-doctoral research at the Technical University, that resulted in a scientific publication. Later that year, he emigrated to the US, where he did three years of post-doctoral research at the Brown University in Providence, Rhode Island. Afterwards, he joined the Research Division of the W. R. Grace Co. in Columbia, Maryland, where he did research work on zeolites and petroleum cracking catalysts.

In 1978, Scherzer moved to California to become the research director at the Filtrol Co., a catalyst manufacturer. In 1983, Scherzer joined the Union Oil Company of California (Unocal) and started research at the Unocal Center for Science and Technology, in Brea, California. He worked there as principal scientist in the area of petroleum refining catalysts, and in 1990 received the Unocal Grand Prize for Creativity. He retired from Unocal in 1995.

== Works ==
Scherzer is the author of the books “Octane-Enhancing Zeolitic FCC Catalysts: Scientific and Technical Aspects” (1990) and “Hydrocracking: Science and Technology” (coauthored with A. J. Gruia), 1996.

During his career, Scherzer had more than 40 scientific articles published and was named as the holder or co-holder of over 50 patents.

After retiring from Unocal, Scherzer wrote an autobiographical/historical novel. The first edition was published in 2005 under the title “While the Gods were silent: Growing up under Fascists and Communists.” A second, revised edition was published in 2014 under the title “In the Vortex.”
