= Robert M. Schertzer =

Canadian ophthalmologist

Robert M. Schertzer FRCSC
- Born: 4 February 1962 (age 64); Montreal, Quebec, Canada
- Education: BSc McGill University (1983); MD Dalhousie University (1988); MEd University of British Columbia (2006)
- Awards: American Academy of Ophthalmology Achievement Award (2016, 2017)
- Scientific career
- Fields: Ophthalmology

Robert M. Schertzer FRCSC (born 4 February 1962) is a Canadian ophthalmologist with a subspecialty in glaucoma treatment. He currently serves as the Clinical Associate Professor of Ophthalmology and Visual Sciences at the University of British Columbia.

== Education ==
Schertzer graduated with a BSc in Physiology from McGill University in 1983 and an MD from the Dalhousie University in 1988. He completed his Ophthalmology residency at McGill University in 1994 and obtained a glaucoma fellowship at Dartmouth in 1996. He graduated with an MEd in Adult Education at the University of British Columbia in 2006.

== Career ==
Schertzer is a Clinical Associate Professor of Ophthalmology and Visual Sciences at the University of British Columbia. He had previously served as Clinical Assistant Professor at the University of Michigan in 1996-1999, University of British Columbia in 1999-2007 and 2008-2013 and Geisel School of Medicine in 2013-2018.

Schertzer serves as a member on the Health Data Coalition Board of Directors.

Schertzer became a Fellow of The Royal College of Surgeons of Canada in 1994.

== Awards ==
2016 and 2017 - American Academy of Ophthalmology Achievement Award.

== Publications ==
- Shimizu S, Lichter PR, Johnson AT, Zhou Z, Higashi M, Gottfredsdottir M, Othman M, Moroi SE, Schertzer RM, Clarke MS, Schwartz AL, Downs CA, Vollrath D, Richards JE: Age-dependent prevalence of mutations at the GLC1A locus in primary open-angle glaucoma. Am. J. Ophthalmol. 130:165-177, 2000.
- LaRoche GR, McIntyre L, Schertzer RM: Epidemiology of severe eye injuries in childhood. Ophthalmology 95(12):1603-1607, 1988.
- Moroi SE, Gottfredsdottir MS, Schteingart MT, Elner SG, Lee CM, Schertzer RM, Abrams GW, Johnson MW: Cystoid Macular Edema Associated with Latanoprost Therapy in a Case Series of Patients with Glaucoma and Ocular Hypertension. Ophthalmology 106(5):1024-1029, 1999.
- Canadian Ophthalmological Society Glaucoma Clinical Practice Guideline Expert Committee; Canadian Ophthalmological Society. Canadian Ophthalmological Society evidence-based clinical practice guidelines for the management of glaucoma in the adult eye. 2009 Aug;44(4):477. PMID 19492005.
- Sugar A, Schertzer RM: The Clinical Course of Phacoemulsification Wound Burns. J Cataract Refract Surg 25(5):688-692, 1999.
- Eibschitz-Tsimhoni M, Schertzer RM, Musch DC, Moroi SE. Incidence and management of encapsulated cysts following Ahmed glaucoma valve insertion. J Glaucoma. 2005 Aug;14(4):276-9.
- Isbister CM, Schertzer RM, Mackenzie PJ: Comparison of Silicone and Polypropylene Ahmed Glaucoma Valves: Two year follow-up. Canadian Journal Ophthalmology 42: 227-232, April 2007.
