= Julius Reisinger =

Czech ballet choreographer (1828–1893)

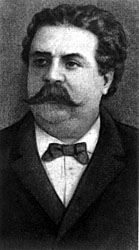
Julius Reisinger, original choreographer of the ballet Swan Lake in 1877

Julius Wentsel Reisinger (1828 – 1893) was a Czech ballet choreographer. He created more than twenty works on various European stages and directed the Moscow company of the Bolshoi Theatre. Reisinger choreographed the first stage production of Swan Lake as well as the production of the first ballet performance for the opening of the Prague National Theatre in 1884. His work on Swan Lake was considered unsuccessful by contemporary critics, although the ballet was popular enough among the general public that it was kept in the active repertoire of the Bolshoi Theatre for seven years and was performed over thirty times.

Reisinger was born in February 1828 in Prague. He was also known by translations of his name as Vaclav or Jules.

== Career ==
He began his professional life as a dancer in the corps de ballet, rising to the position of leading soloist. In 1850, he was the partner of the famous dancer Lucille Grahn in La Esmeralda (as Phoebus) and Giselle (as Hilarion). He also danced the part of Diavolino in Jules Perrot's ballet Catarina or La Fille du Bandit.

In 1852, Reisinger secured an eight-year engagement on the German and Austrian stages. In 1860 he returned to his native Prague to the Nove Mesto Theatre in the position of choreographer. This was the first time a Czech theatre was headed by a Czech choreographer.

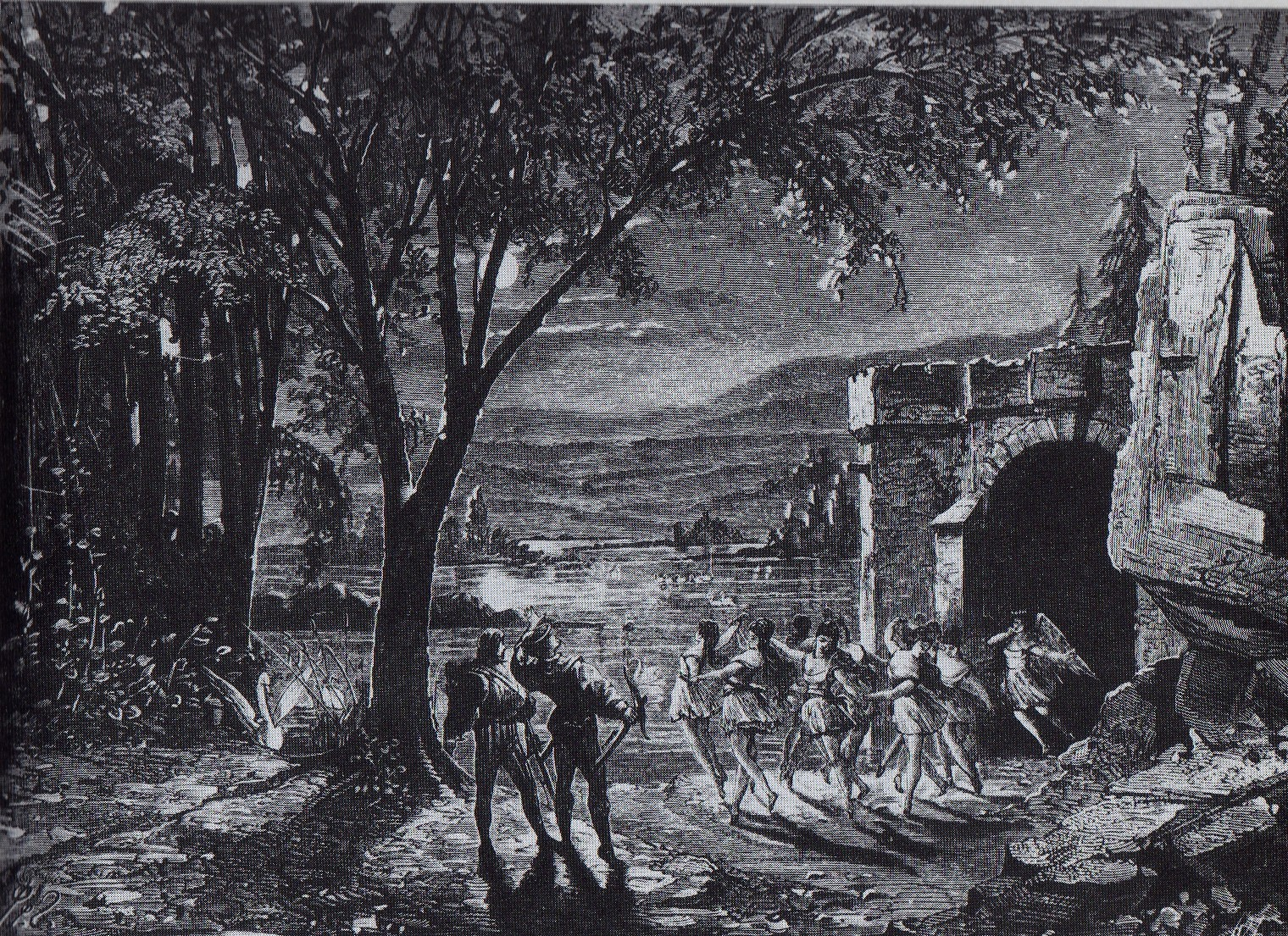
Original sketch design for the ballet Swan Lake in 1877

=== Criticism ===
It is commonly thought that none of Reisinger's ballets was successful but facts contradict this. An example of this would be Swan Lake, a classical ballet that is still being performed today. Why then was such a choreographer invited to brilliant Leipzig where he directed the ballet company from 1864 to 1872? Large-scale works were presented there, such as Saltarello and Interrupted Solitude to the music of the Leipzig kapellmeister, Muhldorfer. And from Leipzig, Reisinger was invited to Russia.

Indications of Reisinger's Moscow endeavors are readily found in the writings of several Russian historians, the first one being a staging of the five-act ballet The Crystal Slipper (1871, a ballet of the Cinderella story) to Muhldorfer's music, which Yuri Bakhrushin referring to original sources, notes as quite successful. In 1873, finding himself in the post of Director of the Moscow Ballet, he created successive multiple-act productions such as Kastchei, where, as confirmed again by Yuri Bakhrushin, the choreographer successfully developed the Russian theme. He also produced Stella and Ariadne (in tandem with Imperial Balletmaster Marius Petipa). All ballets (except Kastchei, which he staged with the two composers Muhldorfer and Gerber) used the music of Gerber. At the same time, in the last two (Stella and Ariadne), Reisinger reworked elements of ancient art according to the dictates of Biedermeier. Added to that, in the production of Ariadne, the Theatre Directorate allotted what was (for that time), the very large sum of 40,000 roubles. This not only suggests the confidence they had invested in Reisinger, but also confirms that in his first two years in Russia he had clearly won the authority of the Imperial Theatre Directorate. It was with this artistic background that the choreographer approached the first production of Swan Lake.
