= The Seasons (ballet) =

Ballet choreographed by Marius Petipa and with music by Alexander Glazunov

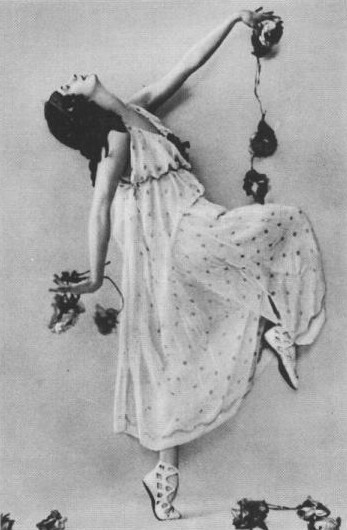
Anna Pavlova in the Bacchante, St. Petersburg, 1907.

The Seasons (Russian: Времена года, Vremena goda; also French: Les Saisons) is an allegorical ballet in one act, four scenes, by the choreographer Marius Petipa, with music by Alexander Glazunov, his Op. 67. The work was composed in 1899, and first performed by the Imperial Ballet on 26 February [O.S. 13 February] 1900 in St. Petersburg, Russia.

== History ==
=== Composition history ===
The score for Marius Petipa's ballet Les Saisons (The Seasons) was originally intended to have been composed by the Italian composer and conductor Riccardo Drigo, who was Glazunov's colleague and close friend. As Les Saisons was being prepared for production, Petipa was also planning his two act Les Millions d’Arlequin to have a score supplied by Glazunov. Since Drigo and Glazunov had an affinity towards each other's assigned ballet, the two composers agreed that Glazunov would compose Les Saisons and that Drigo would compose Les Millions d’Arlequin. Les Saisons was presented for the first time at the Imperial Theatre of the Hermitage on 26 February [O.S. 14 February] 1900 with the Imperial court in attendance.

In 1907, Nikolai Legat staged a revival of Les Saisons at the Imperial Mariinsky Theatre. This production was performed on occasion by the Imperial Ballet after the Russian Revolution, being performed for the last time in 1927.

Les Saisons lived on in an abridged edition in the repertory of Anna Pavlova's touring company.

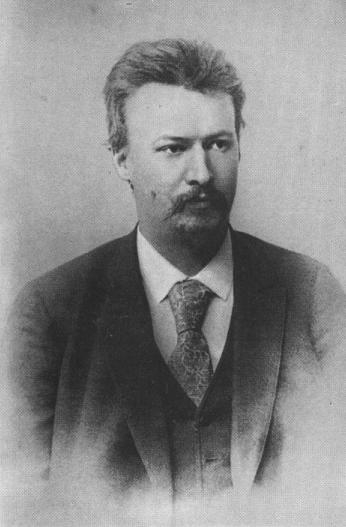
Alexander Glazunov (1896)

=== Performance history ===
St. Petersburg premiere (World Premiere)

- Date: 23 February [O.S. 11 February] 1900
- Place: Imperial Theatre of the Hermitage, Winter Palace, St. Petersburg
- Balletmaster: Marius Petipa
- Conductor: Riccardo Drigo
- Scene designer: Pyotr Lambin
- Costume designer: Yevgeni Ponomaryov

Other notable productions

- 1900, February 13, St. Petersburg, Imperial Mariinsky Theatre, same ensemble as the premiere
- 1907, St. Petersburg, Mariinsky Theatre, balletmaster Nikolay Legat, conducted by Drigo, décor by Lambin, costumes by Aleksandr Golovin.

== Roles and original cast ==
Role	St. Petersburg 1900	St. Petersburg 1907
Winter	Aleksey Bulgakov	Nikolay Solyannikov
Frost	Anna Pavlova	Agrippina Vaganova
Ice	Yuliya Sedova	E. Vill
Hail	Vera Trefilova	Lidiya Kyaksht
Snow	L. Petipa	Y. Ofitserova
Zephyr	Nikolay Legat	Mikhail Obukhov
Rose	Olga Preobrazhenskaya	Vera Trefilova
Swallow	Varvara Rïkhlyakova	Varvara Rïkhlyakova
Spirit of the Corn	Matilda Kshesinskaya	Olga Preobrazhenskaya
Faun	Mikhail Obukhov	Georgiy Kyaksht
Satyr	Aleksandr Gorsky	Leonid Leontyev
Satyr	Aleksandr Shiryayev	A. Matyatin
Bacchus	Pavel Gerdt	Samuil Andrianov
Bacchante	Marie Petipa	Anna Pavlova

=== Publication history ===
- 1901, M.P. Belyayev, Leipzig

== Instrumentation ==
Woodwinds: 1 piccolo, 2 flutes, 2 oboes (2nd doubling english horn in F), 2 clarinets in B-flat and A, 2 bassoons

Brass: 4 french horns in F, 2 trumpets in B-flat, 3 trombones, tuba

Percussion: timpani, triangle, tambourine, military drum, cymbal, bass drum, glockenspiel

Keyboard: celesta, pianino (upright piano)

Strings: harp, 1st and 2nd violins, violas, cellos, contrabass

== Synopsis ==
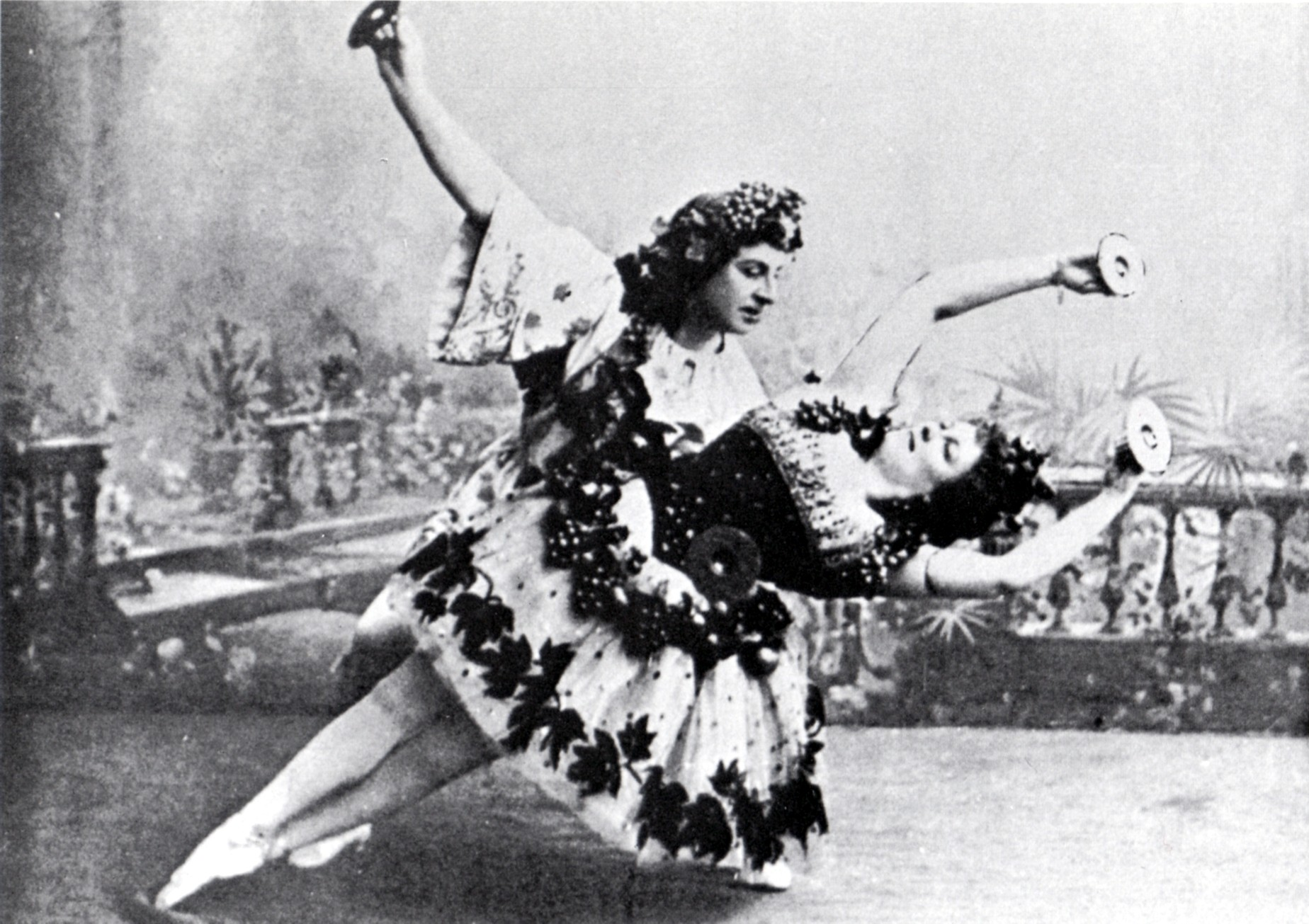
Marie Petipa and Pavel Gerdt in the Bacchanale of the scene L'Automne. (St. Petersburg, 1900)

Tableau 1 — A winter landscape

Winter is surrounded by his companions: Hoar-frost, Ice, Hail and Snow, who amuse themselves with a band of snowflakes. Two gnomes enter, and soon light a fire that causes all assembled to vanish.

Tableau 2 — A landscape covered with flowers

Spring dances with Zephyr, flower fairies, and enchanted birds. Upon feeling the heat of the sun, the assembly takes flight.

Tableau 3 — A landscape of flowing fields of wheat in the breeze

Cornflowers and poppies revel in the light and warmth of the sun; the spirit of the corn appears. They take rest after their exertion. Now naiads appear, who bring water to refresh the growth, and the Spirit of Corn dances in thanksgiving. Satyrs and fauns enter playing their pipes, and attempt to carry off the Spirit of the Corn, but she and the flowers are rescued by the wind of Zephyr.

Tableau 4 — A landscape in Autumn

The Seasons take part in a glorious dance (the well-known "autumn bacchanale") while leaves from autumn trees rain upon their merriment. Winter, Spring, the Bird and Zephyr dance. Bacchantes, Satyrs, Fauns and the spirit of the corn continue the revels until more leaves fall on the revellers.

Apotheosis — The Sable sky

Constellations of stars sparkle above the earth.

== Résumé of dances and the mise-en-scène ==
List of the numbers comprising The Seasons taken from the Yearbook of the Imperial Theatres, 1899-1900, being the original titles of the dances and mise en scène as originally staged.

- No.01 Prélude

Tableau I — L’Hiver (winter)

- No.02 Scène de l’Hiver
- No.03 Variation du givre (frost)
- No.04 Variation de la glace (ice)
- No.05 Variation de la grêle (hail)
- No.06 Variation de la neige (snow)
- No.07 Coda

Tableau II — Le Printemps (spring)

- No.08 Entrée de Printemps, Zéphyre, les Fées des fleurs, les oiseaux et les fleurs

Tableau III — L’Été (summer)

- No.09 Scène de l’Été
- No.10 Valse des bleuets et des pavots (Waltz of the Cornflowers and Poppies)
- No.11 Barcarolle – Entrée des naïades, les satyres et des faunes
- No.12 Variation de l’Esprit du maïs
- No.13 Coda

Tableau IV — L’Automne (fall)

- No.14 Grande bacchanale des saisons
- No.15 Petit adage
- No.16 Variation du Satyre
- No.17 Coda générale

Tableau V — Apothéose

- No.18 La Révélation des étoiles

== Discography ==
- 1929, Aleksandr Glazunov, unknown orchestra
- 1953, Roger Désormière, Orchestre National de France
- 1956, Albert Wolff, Paris Conservatoire Orchestra
- 1966, Ernest Ansermet, Suisse Romande Orchestra
- 196?, Konstantin Ivanov, USSR Symphony Orchestra
- 196?, Robert Irving, Concert Arts Orchestra
- 1978, Yevgeny Svetlanov, Philharmonia Orchestra
- 1987, Neeme Järvi, Scottish National Orchestra
- 1989, Vladimir Ashkenazy, Royal Philharmonic Orchestra
- 1993, Edo de Waart, Minnesota Orchestra
- 1987, Ondrej Lenard, Czecho-Slovak Radio Symphony Orchestra
- 2004, José Serebrier, Royal Scottish National Orchestra

== See also ==
- List of ballets by title
