= The Talisman (ballet) =

1889 ballet by Marius Petipa

Le Talisman is a ballet in 4 Acts and 7 Scenes, with choreography by Marius Petipa, and music by Riccardo Drigo. Libretto by Konstantin Augustovich Tarnovsky and Marius Petipa. It was premièred on 6 February [O.S. 25 January] 1889 at the Imperial Mariinsky Theatre in St. Petersburg, Russia This ballet gave rise to the so-called Talisman Pas de Deux, which is today danced by many ballet companies.

== Roles and original cast ==
Role	St Petersburg 1889	St Petersburg 1895	St Petersburg 1909
Niriti, daughter of the Queen of the Heavens	Elena Cornalba	Pierina Legnani	Olga Preobrajenska
Noureddin, the Maharajah	Pavel Gerdt	Pavel Gerdt	Nikolai Legat
Vayou, the Wind God	Enrico Cecchetti	Alexander Gorsky	Vaslav Nijinsky
Amravati, the Queen of the Heavens	Anna Johansson		
Nal, the weaver's son	Alfred Bekefi		
Nirilya, Nal's fiancée	Marie Petipa		
King Akdar			Pavel Gerdt

== Revivals/restagings ==
- Revival by Marius Petipa for the Imperial Ballet, with Drigo revising his score. First presented on 4 November [O.S. 23 October] 1895 at the Imperial Mariinsky Theatre.
- Revival by Nikolai Legat (based on Petipa's original choreography) for the Imperial Ballet, with Drigo revising and reorchestrating his original score. First presented on 12 December [O.S. 29 November] 1909 at the Imperial Mariinsky Theatre.
- Revival by Luigi Tornelli for the ballet of La Scala under the title Le Porte-bonheur. First presented at La Scala, Milan, Italy on 18 July 1908.
- Revival by Paul Chalmer and Ileana Citaristi for the Balletto del Teatro Filarmonico (a.k.a. the Arena Ballet). First presented on March 14, 1997, at the Teatro Verdi di Padova in Padua, Italy. Principal Dancers - Carla Fracci (as Niriti), Alessandro Molin (as Vayou, the Wind God), and Stephane Fournial (as Nouriddin).

== Notes ==
- This ballet took place in ancient India, and was a rather mediocre success upon its première. The principal attraction of the balletomanes and critics was Drigo's score. The artist Alexander Benois told in his memoirs (titled Mémoirs) of his extreme delight with Drigo's score, which he said inspired a "short infatuation" in him as a young student at the Saint Petersburg State University - "It was Drigo's simple and charming music that had attracted both Valetchka (Walter Nouvelle - member of Mir iskusstva) and me to Petipa's 'The Talisman'. In fact we had been so delighted with it at the première that our noisy approval had attracted the attention, and seemed to shock, the then rather popular St. Petersburg General Governor Grösser ... he turned round (from his permanent seat in the front row stalls), affecting a severe expression, and shook his finger at us. My enthusiasm was so great, however, that I could not stop applauding and even felt compelled to exclaim "Mais puisque, Excellence, c'est un chef d'œuvre!" - upon which his Excellency deigned to bestow on me a fatherly smile."

== Libretto ==
Prologue — In the clouds

The gods and spirits descend to meet the Goddess Amravati, Queen of the heavens (Valse des esprits). She is in despair, and is asked why. She replies "It is today, in accordance with my immortal husband's wishes, that my daughter, the goddess Niriti, must descend to earth, and perhaps may never return."

Music heralds the entrance of Niriti (Entrée de Niriti). She runs to embrace her mother, and is then informed that the time has come for her to visit the earth. "But why must I visit the earth?" Niriti asks. "To test your heart against the temptations of earthly love," replies Amravati, "and should you fail, you will forfeit your right to immortality." "Must I go alone?" asks Niriti. "No," replies the goddess; "I have chosen a fine companion for you."

Vayou, the god of the wind, flies overhead, bringing a storm in his wake (Le vent de Vayou). He bows to the Queen and begs pardon for his tardiness; "A group of mortals dared to attempt to learn the secrets of the poles," he says, "for which I was forced to sink their ships."

Queen Amravati hands Vayou her golden mace, which makes him ruler of the spirits and of all the elements. She then takes a star from her crown and gives it to Niriti. "This talisman shall protect you against all danger which may befall you." The Goddess adds, "However, should she lose it, you shall never return to the heavens again." "But," enquires Niriti, "surely the mace shall force the talisman to be returned to me." "No," replies Amravati, "a talisman lost by a maiden of the air must be freely returned to her by whatever mortal may come to possess it."

Amravati bids her daughter farewell. Niriti and Vayou descend to the earth.

Act I — The hut of the old weaver Kadoor

Nal is working busily at his loom so that he may meet Nirilya, his betrothed. He is then distracted by a sun-beam which dazzles his eyes so that he decides to cover the window with his cloak. As he goes toward it his beloved Nirilya appears. He begs her to enter, but she refuses. Nal, annoyed, returns to his work. Nirilya creeps behind him and covers his eyes with her hands.

Enter Kadoor, accompanied by his friends and relatives. The lovers are embarrassed. The weaver tells them that they have nothing to be ashamed of, for they are to be married on the following day. He reminds them of their friends who have come to wish them happiness. The young people begin dancing while the old weaver and some of his guests decorate the hut with flowers and garlands (Danse des amis de Nirilya et Nal).

Towards the conclusion of their dances a handsome youth appears - Noureddin, the young Maharajah of Lahore. He has lost his way while hunting and asks for shelter for the night. Kadoor welcomes the visitor and places refreshments before him. Noureddin begs the young people to continue their dancing, so Nirilya and Nal perform a joyous dance to the delight of the young Maharajah (Danse orientale), who gives Nirilya a necklace and Nal a purse of gold. Then, feeling tired, Noureddin asks to be shown to his room. The guests leave and darkness falls. There is distant thunder and lightning.

Enter Niriti and Vayou (Premières sensations). Niriti enquires where they are. Vayou asks her to remain while he goes to explore. Feeling tired from their travels, Niriti lies down and falls asleep.

Noureddin comes out of his room, rubbing his eyes, having been disturbed by a strange noise. He catches sight of the sleeping Niriti, and is amazed by her beauty. Niriti awakens. Frightened by the stranger she attempts to flee, but Noureddin holds her firm and demands a kiss. Struggling violently, she calls to Vayou for help. Suddenly Vayou appears and seizes Niriti while brandishing the golden mace. There is a violent gust of wind and Niriti and Vayou disappear. During the escape, the talisman falls from Niriti's head. Noureddin searches vainly for Niriti and discovers the talisman. Convinced that he has met his true love, he swears to find the beautiful girl.

Enter King Akdar and his daughter, the Princess Damayanti, attended by a magnificent retinue. The King expresses his delight at seeing Noureddin, as his daughter, to whom Noureddin is betrothed, had been troubled by his disappearance. The company now departs, and the King requests that Noureddin follow them.

Niriti and Vayou reappear, followed by spirits of the earth. They search anxiously for the talisman, but in vain.

Act II — The gardens of King Akdar's magnificent palace in Dehli

Servants are completing the preparations for the feast which will prelude the wedding of the Princess Damayanti and Noureddin. Enter King Akdar and his daughter, who seat themselves upon the throne. They are attended by rajahs, bayadères, eunuchs and the Princess's attendants. Noureddin enters, followed by his bodyguard Djemil and several of his guards.

The festival begins with various diversions (Danse nautch, Danse de l’hindoustan), with Noureddin and the Princess Damayanti performing a dance together in which the young Maharajah is haunted by visions of Niriti (Grand pas d’action). At the end the chief eunuch announces that the feast is ready in the great hall of the palace. Noureddin lingers behind. He cannot forget the beautiful girl he encountered in Kadoor's hut.

Moonlight filters into the garden. As Noureddin begins to leave to attend the feast a rose-bush springs from the ground and bars his way. Other bushes appear and from each emerges a rose in human form. From the center rose-bush comes Niriti in the guise of the Goddess of the Flowers, and from each side appear the spirits of the earth. With bewitching glances they ask him to give up the talisman, but when Noureddin refuses they vanish. Niriti and her retinue of flowers perform dances to entice Noureddin into giving up the talisman (Grand ballabile — La Rose de Bengale), but to no avail. Niriti and her retinue disappear.

Fanfares announcing King Akdar are heard. "Come!" cries the King, "the priests are waiting to perform the wedding ceremony.". Noureddin, unable to forget Niriti, confesses that he loves another and must refuse the Princess Damayanti's hand. The Princess then faints into the arms of her attendants and the enraged King draws his sword; his guards follows suit. At that moment Noureddin's guards place themselves in a posture defense to protect him. A terrible struggle is imminent when flames rise from the earth and separate the antagonists. Vayou has devised this to save Noureddin so that he may return Niriti her talisman.

Niriti appears in the fountain and, unseen, wafts him a passionate kiss. Her heart has been melted by his indomitable love.

Act III, tableau 1 — A bazaar on the banks of the river Ganges

It is market-day and the bazaar is crowded with types of the numerous races of India. Noureddin enters with his troops on his way back to Lahore. He calls a halt and lies down to rest. The talisman can be seen glittering from his breast. At a sign from one of the slave-dealers dancing begins (Danse des montagnards de l’Himalaya, Pas Katchack).

Enter Vayou and Niriti, who are disguised as a Brahim and his slave. Vayou presents Niriti to the crowd wrapped in a long veil (Danse sous le voile). Recognising Noureddin, they decide to steal the talisman, but Noureddin recognises Niriti, who tries to hide among the crowd. Noureddin pursues her but is stopped by Vayou, who reproaches him for annoying his slave. "Will you sell me your slave?" asks Noureddin. "Yes," replies the Brahmin, "in exchange for the talisman on your breast." Noureddin refuses. Vayou and the supposed slave depart.

Noureddin is now suspicious that the talisman should be preferred to the wealth he could have offered and feels that there is some mystery connected to it. He wonders if the slave-owner's tongue might be loosened with wine and, calling his bodyguard Djemil, whispers his orders.

Niriti and Vayou return. Noureddin goes to them and asks the Brahmin to taste a new European drink: perhaps it may help them come to an understanding. Vayou drinks and, finding the drink greatly to his taste, continually asks for his glass to be refilled. Thus, Vayou becomes increasingly communicative and confides that his slave is really the Goddess Amravati's daughter, and so long as Noureddin possesses the talisman, Niriti must remain on earth. To emphasize his word his Vayou strikes the table with his golden mace, which snaps in two. He continues to drink until he falls to the ground (Scène dansante — L’ivresse de Vayou).

Noureddin orders the bodyguard Djemil to seize Niriti, who desperately calls for Vayou to help her. He awakes but, stupefied with wine, is helpless. Niriti is led away.

Act III, tableau II — Some ancient ruins at night

Niriti is brought in by the bodyguard Djemil and placed before Noureddin, who orders his men to keep strict watch. Niriti then beseeches Noureddin to restore her talisman. He replies that he cannot, for if he does she shall return to heaven, and he loves her too much to allow it (La danse à l’amour). She admits that he speaks the truth, but implores him to help her return to heaven and her mother.

Noureddin refuses because he wishes for her to remain on earth and be his wife and queen, but Niriti refuses. Noureddin pleads on his knees, but again she refuses. He then reminds her that she is in his power and has no choice but to cede to his wishes. Niriti then plucks a dagger from Noureddin's belt and threatens to stab herself. He quickly wrests the weapon from her and, furious that she should hold his love for her so lightly, snatches the talisman from his breast and throws it at her feet. There is a deafening clap of thunder.

Act III, tableau III — At the top of the stage is seen the heavens, at the bottom, the ancient ruins

The Goddess Amravati awaits Niriti's return. Niriti, clasping her talisman, is about to ascend when she resolves to bid Noureddin farewell. Seeing his eyes filled with tears she is overcome with sadness herself. She begins to wonder whether celestial delights can equal the earthly happiness which Noureddin offers, and which she is about to sacrifice. She wavers, then drops the talisman and throws herself into Noureddin's arms.

Apotheosis

The talisman ascends to heaven. Seated on her throne, the Goddess Amravati is surrounded by gods and other heavenly spirits.

== Résumé of dances ==
Prologue

- Valse des esprits
- Entrée de Niriti
- Le vent de Vayou

Act I

- Danse des amis de Nirilya et Nal
- Danse orientale
- Premières sensations

Act II

- Danse nautch
- Danse de l’hindoustan
- Grand pas d’action
  - Andante
  - Variation I
  - Variation II
  - Coda
- Grand ballabile — La Rose de Bengale
  - Adage
  - Valse des bijoux
  - Pizzicato
  - Grand coda

Act III

- Danse des montagnards de l’Himalaya
- Pas Katchack
- Danse sous le voile
- Scène dansante — L’ivresse de Vayou
- La danse à l’amour

== Gallery ==
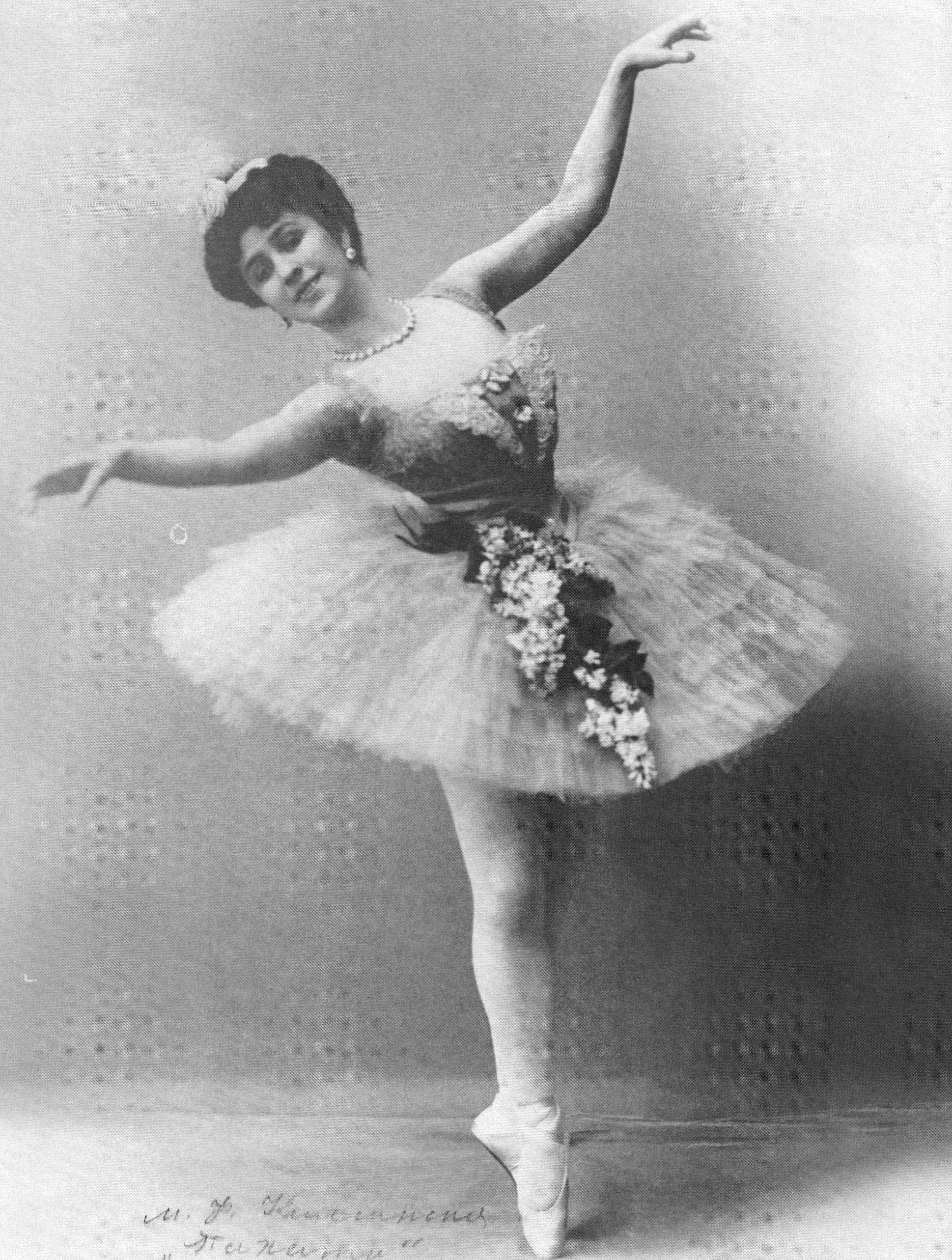
Mathilde Kschessinskaya costumed as Niriti for the Grand Pas des Fleurs of Act II in Nikolai Legat's revival of Petipa's The Talisman, St. Petersburg, 1910

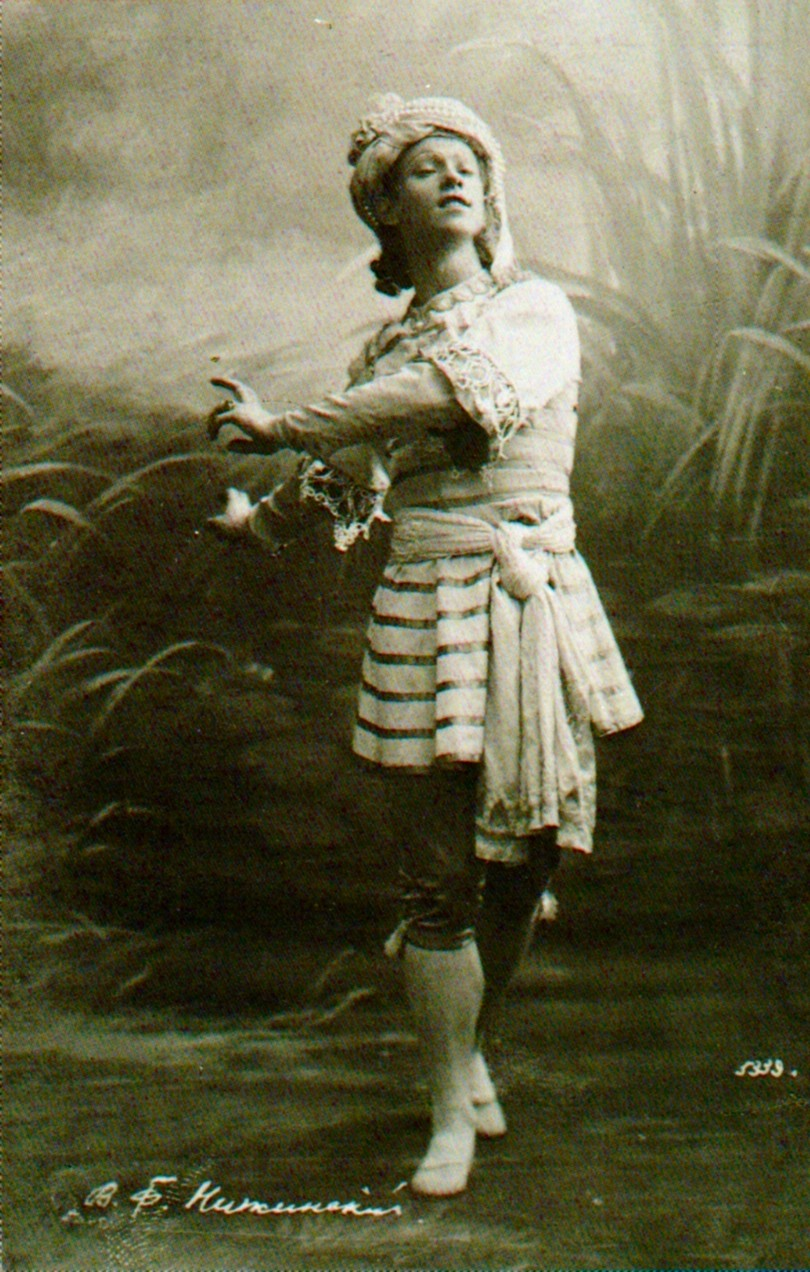
Vaslav Nijinsky as Vayou in Nikolai Legat's revival of Petipa's The Talisman, St. Petersburg, 1910
