= The Magic Flute (ballet) =

1893 ballet comique by Lev Ivanov and Riccardo Drigo

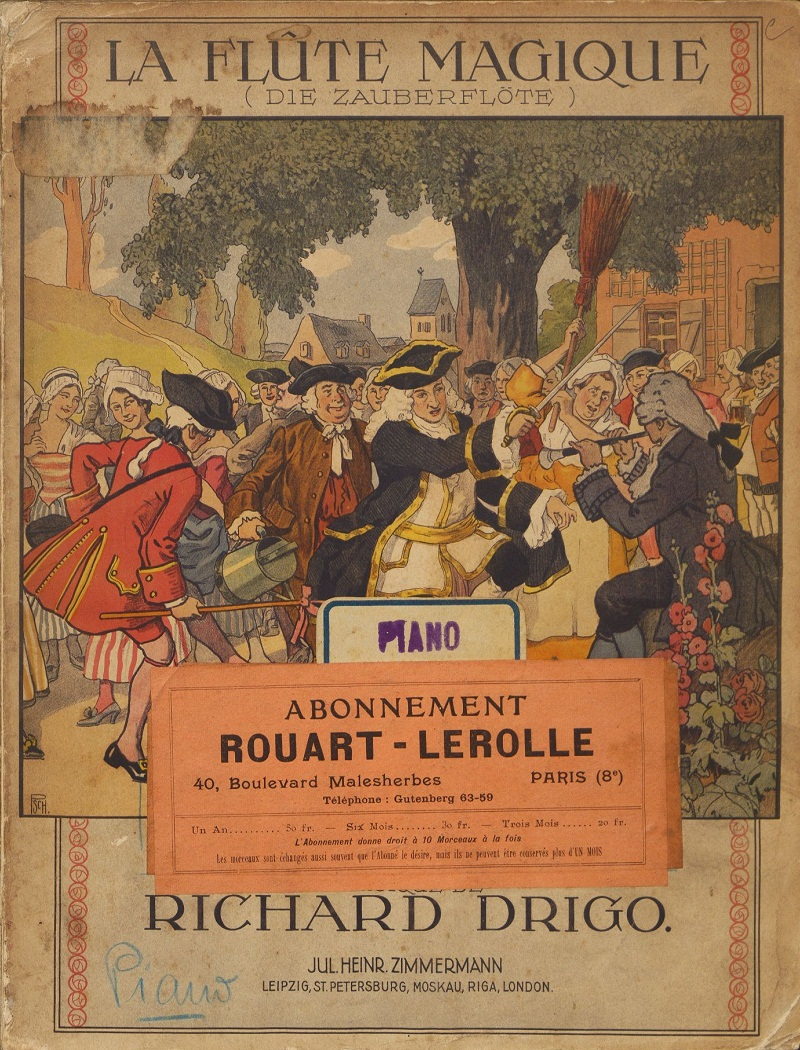
Frontispiece for the original published piano reduction of Riccardo Drigo's score for Lev Ivanov's La flûte magique, 1912

La flûte magique (lit. 'The Magic Flute'; Russian: Волшебная флейта, romanized: Volshebnaya fleita) is a ballet comique in one act, originally choreographed by Lev Ivanov to the music of Riccardo Drigo. First presented by students of the Imperial Ballet School at the school's theatre on 4 February [O.S. 23 January] 1893. Although it has the same title as Mozart's opera The Magic Flute, the two works have no other connection.

== History ==
La flûte magique was originally created for the graduation performance of students of the Imperial Ballet School. The ballet premiered on the stage of the school's theatre on 4 February [O.S. 23 January] 1893, and featured a young Mikhail Fokine in the principal role of Luc. La flûte magique was soon transferred to the repertory of the Imperial Ballet, where it was first presented on 23 April [O.S. 11 April] 1893 at the Imperial Mariinsky Theatre with Anna Johansson in the role of Lise and Pavel Gerdt in the role of Luc. The ballet served as a useful vehicle for the ballerinas of the Tsarist stage including Anna Pavlova, who would later include the work in the repertory of her own touring company.

Riccardo Drigo's score was later published in piano reduction and orchestral partition by the music publisher Zimmerman in 1912. The score was recorded in 1990 by the Orchestra of the Royal Opera House, Covent Garden, conducted by Richard Bonynge and issued on the label London.

The ballet has been re-staged in several versions, notably by Peter Martins for the School of American Ballet. This production was first presented on 9 May 1981. A second premiere was given by the New York City Ballet on 21 January 1982, at the New York State Theater, Lincoln Center with décor designed by David Mitchell and costumes by Ben Benson.

== Program ==
List of scenes and dances from The Magic Flute taken from the published piano score and the original program of 1893.

Ballet comique in one act

- no.01 Danse villageoise
- no.02 Pas d'action
- no.03 Scène et danse forcée (ancien air de ballet d'auter inconnu)
- no.04 Pas de deux
- no.05 Grand ballabile —

a. Grand adage
b. Variation pour quatre danseuses
c. Variation de Luc (M. Mikhail Fokine)
d. Pizzicato de Lise (Mlle. Stanislava Belinskaya)
e. Grand ballabile

== See also ==
- List of ballets by title
