= Le Réveil de Flore =

1894 ballet by Marius Petipa

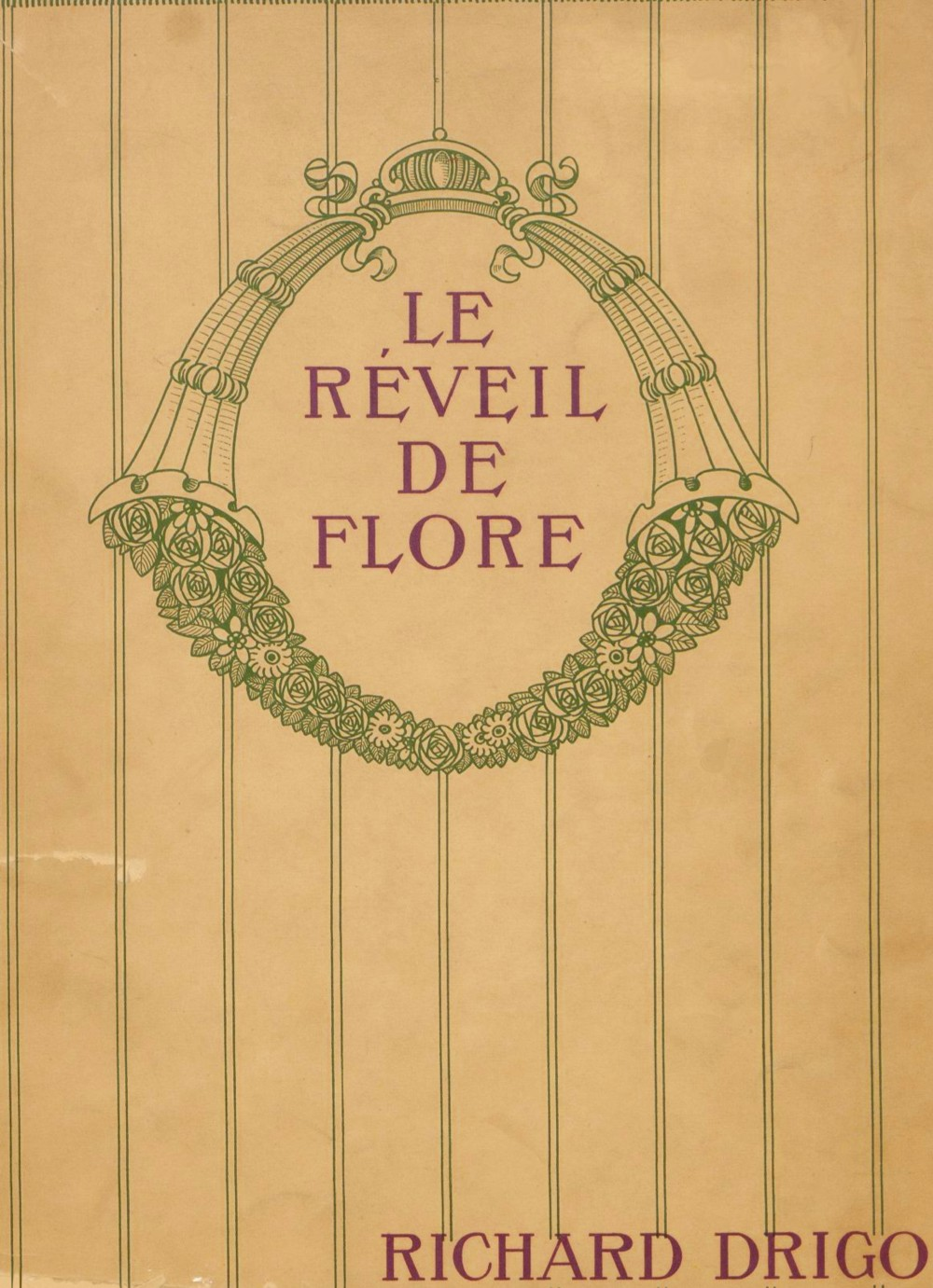
- Frontispiece for the piano reduction of Drigo's score for Le Réveil de Flore, published by Zimmermann, 1914.
- Choreographer: Marius Petipa
- Music: Riccardo Drigo
- Libretto: Marius Petipa and Lev Ivanov
- Premiere: 6 August [O.S. 25 July] 1894 (Peterhof); 20 January [O.S. 8 January] 1895 (Imperial Mariinsky Theatre); St. Petersburg, Russia
- Design: Mikhail Bocharov
- Genre: Ballet anacréontique

Le Réveil de Flore (lit. 'The Awakening of Flora'; Russian: Пробуждение Флоры, romanized: Probuzhdenie flory) is a ballet anacréontique in one act, with choreography by Marius Petipa and music by Riccardo Drigo, to a libretto written by Petipa and Lev Ivanov. First presented by the Imperial Ballet at Peterhof Palace on 6 August [O.S. 25 July] 1894.

== History ==
Marius Petipa and Riccardo Drigo's one-act ballet Le Réveil de Flore was originally created as a piece d'occasion in honor of the wedding of Emperor Alexander III's daughter, the Grand Duchess Xenia, to the Grand Duke Alexander Mikhailovich. Their wedding took place at the Cathedral of Saints Peter and Paul at Peterhof on 6 August [O.S. 25 July] 1894 before the whole of the Imperial Russian aristocracy, the Imperial court, foreign royalty, and other prominent members of society. Three days later on 9 August [O.S. 28 July] 1894 the wedding party and guests attended a lavish performance at the newly renovated imperial theatre of Peterhof where Le Réveil de Flore was presented for the first time after the second act of Charles Gounod's Roméo et Juliette.

Le Réveil de Flore was soon transferred to the stage of the Imperial Mariinsky Theatre where it was first performed on 20 January [O.S. 8 January] 1895 with the same cast. This performance took place during a farewell benefit for the ballerina Maria Anderson, who had been forced into early retirement after sustaining burn injuries in a theatre fire.

Le Réveil de Flore was praised by contemporary critics, with the critic of the St. Petersburg Gazette stating that the ballet "...was one of those masterpieces with which Marius Petipa has made a gift to the ballet stage."

Riccardo Drigo's music was also acclaimed and was issued in orchestral partition and piano reduction by the music publisher Zimmerman in 1914.

The choreography for Le Réveil de Flore was erroneously credited as a joint effort between Marius Petipa and the Imperial Ballet's second Maître de ballet Lev Ivanov in the original printed theatre programme. A review in the St. Petersburg Gazette of the first répétition générale of the ballet also credited the choreography to both Petipa and Ivanov. This caused Marius Petipa to write a letter of correction to the newspaper:

In no. 201 of your much respected newspaper, a not fully accurate communication was reported about the production of the ballet Le Réveil de Flore. The programme of the ballet was created by L. I. Ivanov and me together, (but) the production of the dances and the mise-en-scène belong exclusively to me; Mr. L. I. Ivanov had no part in them.

The ballerina Anna Pavlova included an abridged version of Le Réveil de Flore in the repertory of her touring company. Conductor Richard Bonynge recorded Pavlova's abridged edition of Drigo's score for his 1974 LP "Homage to Pavlova" with the London Symphony Orchestra.

== 2007 revival by Sergei Vikharev ==
Le Réveil de Flore was given its final performance in 1919. Marius Petipa's choreography for the ballet was documented in the Stepanov method of choreographic notation soon after its premiere in 1894, being among the first ballets to be recorded in this method. Today this notation is part of the Sergeyev Collection, held in Harvard University Library's theatre collection.

In 2005, the choreographer and historian Sergei Vikharev utilized this choreographic notation to prepare for a revival of the original production of Le Réveil de Flore for the Mariinsky Ballet. The production included décor and costumes based on the original designs, and Riccardo Drigo's score was restored from the original hand-written manuscript held in the archives of the Mariinsky Theatre's music library.

The production was first presented during the VIIth International Ballet Festival on 12 April 2007 at the Mariinsky Theatre, St. Petersburg. The principal dancers were Evgenia Obraztsova as the Goddess Flora, Xenia Ostreikovskaya as the Goddess Aurora, Svetland Ivanova as the Goddess Diana, Vladimir Shklyarov as the God Zephyr, Maxim Chaschegorov as the God Apollo, Valeria Martynyuk as the God Cupid, Alexei Timofeyev as the God Mercury and Daria Sukhorukova as the Goddess Hebe.

Sergei Vikharev commented to the St. Petersburg Times that the ballet was "... like an ornate Fabergé egg."

Sergei Vikharev's revival of Le Réveil de Flore was awarded the 2007 Golden Mask award.

== Roles and original cast ==
Role	St Petersburg 1894
Flora, the Goddess of the Spring	Mathilde Kschessinskaya
Diana, the Goddess of the Moon	Olga Leonova
Aquilon, the God of the North Wind	Alexander Gorsky
Aurora, the Goddess of the Dawn	Anna Johansson
Apollo, the God of the Sun	Pavel Gerdt
Zephyr, the God of the West Wind	Nikolai Legat
Cupid, the God of Love	Vera Trefilova
Mercury, the Messenger of the Gods	Sergei Legat
Hebe, the Goddess of Youth	Claudia Kulichevskaya

== Résumé of dances and scenes ==
List of scenes and dances of Le Réveil de Flore taken from the piano score that was published in 1914.

- №01 Prélude
- №02 Danse de Diane–nocturne
- №03 L’apparition d’Aquilon
- №04 Scène et danse de la rosée–scherzo
- №05 L’apparition d’Aurore
- №06 Valse
- №07–a Entrée d’Apollon
- №07–b Entrée de Zéphyr
- №07–c Entrée de Cupidon suivi des amours–pizzicato
- №08 Pas d’action—

—a. Scène et Pas d'ensemble
—b. Variation de Zéphyr
—c. Variation de Flore
—d. Grande valse-coda

- №09 L’arrivée et scène de Mercure, de Ganymède et d’Hébé
- №10 Grande marche–bacchanale
- №11 Grand pas
- №12 Galop générale
- №13 Apothéose: Gloire d’Olympe

== Libretto ==
Taken from the original published piano score of 1894.

Tableau 1 — It is night. Flora, the goddess of Spring, is deep asleep with her nymphs; Diana, the goddess of Moon, guards their peace. With the approach of dawn, a freshness is felt in the air. Diana hides in the clouds.

Tableau 2 — Aquilon, the northern wind, rushes stormily over the locale; his cold breath of wind awakens Flora and forces her to seek refuge in the foliage. The appearance of chilling dew brings Flora to despair, and she implores Aurora, the goddess of the dawn, to help them.

Tableau 3 — Aurora consoles Flora with tender caresses and announces that Apollo, the god of day, who will end their sufferings, is following behind her. Aurora, Flora, and her nymphs perform a waltz.

Tableau 4 — With the appearance of resplendent Apollo, everything becomes animated. Smitten with the beauty of Flora, Apollo kisses her. At his call, Zephyr, the god of the gentle west wind, flies to his beloved Flora's embrace. He is followed by Cupid and her little amours. "You must be his helpmate," Apollo tells her, "It is the will of the gods." Everyone is delighted; Cupid, amours, and nymphs rejoice over the lover's happiness. A classical Pas d’action is performed.

Tableau 5 — Mercury, messenger of the gods, announces Hebé, the goddess of youth, and Ganymede, cupbearer to the gods. They present Flora and Zephyr a cup of nectar and proclaim that Jupiter has given them eternal youth.

Tableau 6 — A procession. The chariot of Bacchus and Ariadne is accompanied by bacchantes, satyrs, fauns, sylvans, and others. A Grand pas is performed by all assembled, followed by a rousing finale.

Apotheosis — Olympus is revealed; Jupiter appears, Juno, Neptune, Vulcan, Minerva, Ceres, Mars, Pluto, Proserpina, Venus, and others.

== Pas de quatre La Roseraie ==
In 2004, the teacher and choreographer Yuri Burlaka created a pas de quatre called La Roseraie for a student workshop of choreography at the Bolshoi Theatre. The pas de quatre La Roseraie was based on themes from Marius Petipa's ballet Le Réveil de Flore with four ballerinas performing as the Greco-Roman deities Diana, Aurora, Hebe and Flora. The choreography for the pas de quatre utilized notations for four variations found among the materials for the full-length Le Réveil de Flore in the Sergeyev Collection. The music was taken from the score for Le Réveil de Flore as well as from other works by Drigo. Today the pas de quatre La Roseraie has become a popular piece with both ballet academies and professional companies across Russia, while its variations are frequently performed at ballet competitions.

== Gallery ==
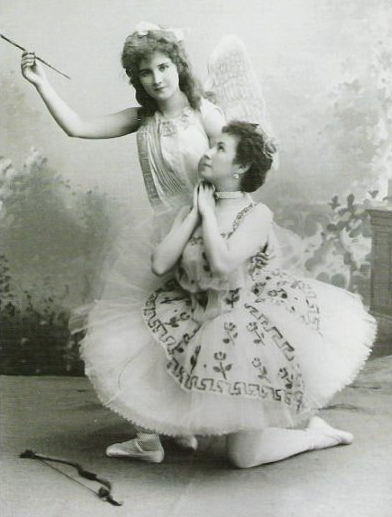
Mathilde Kschessinskaya as the goddess Flora (right) and Vera Trefilova as the god Cupid (left) in Le Réveil de Flore, 1894.

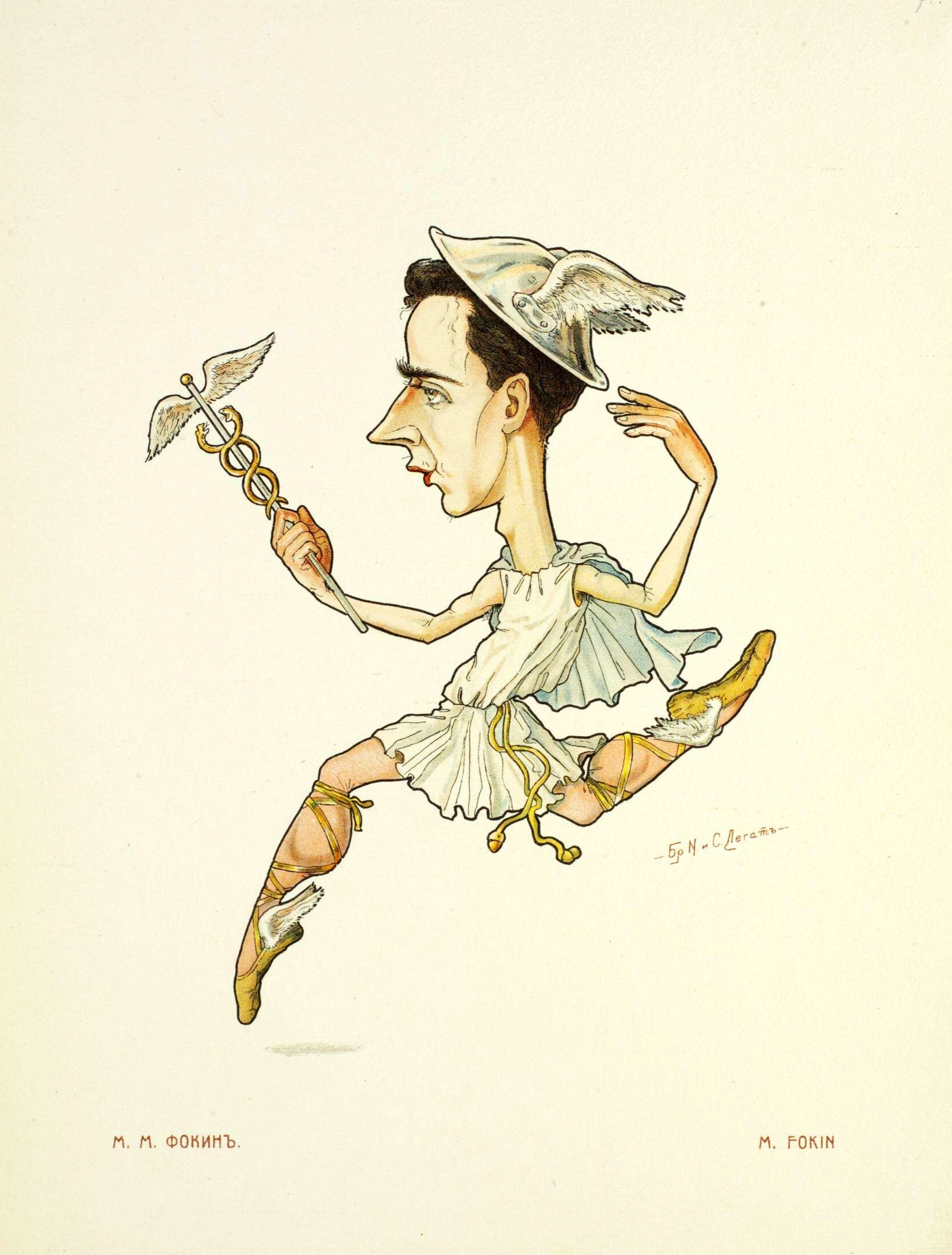
Caricature of Mikhail Fokine as the god Mercury in Le Réveil de Flore by the brothers Nikolai and Sergei Legat, circa 1903.

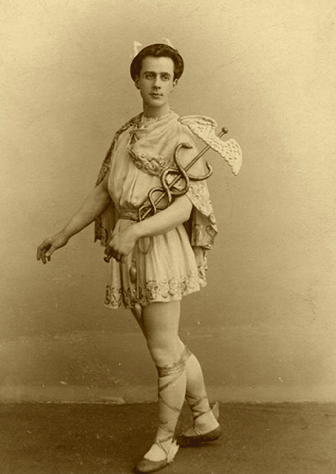
Mikhail Fokine as the god Mercury in Le Réveil de Flore, circa 1901.

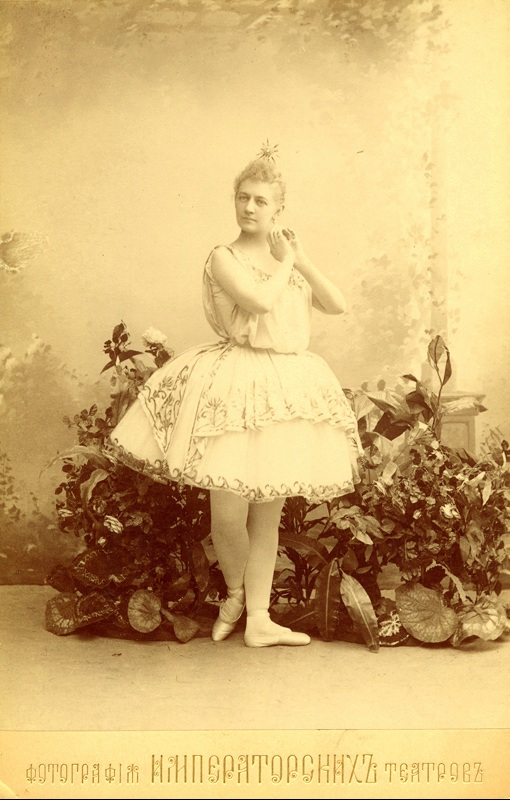
Anna Johansson as the goddess Aurora in Le Réveil de Flore, 1894.

Victor Baranov as the god Apollo, Eugenia Obratzova as the goddess Flora and Maxim Chaschegorov as the god Zephyr with the corps de ballet in the Mariinsky Ballet's reconstruction of Le Réveil de Flore. St. Petersburg, 2007

The apotheosis "Gloire d’Olympe" from the Mariinsky Ballet's reconstruction of Le Réveil de Flore. St. Petersburg, 2007
