= The Enchanted Forest (ballet) =

La Forêt enchantée
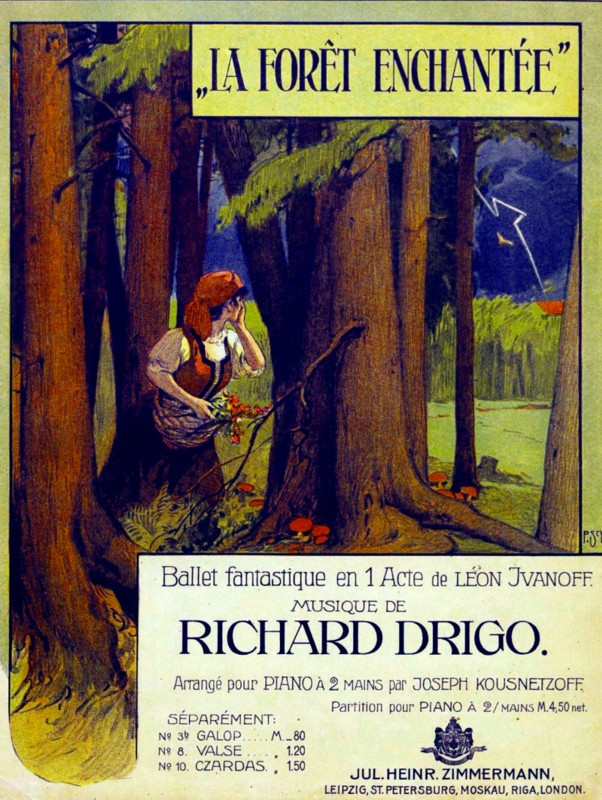
- Illustrated title page for the piano reduction of Riccardo Drigo's score for Lev Ivanov's La Forêt enchantée as issued by the music publisher Zimmerman, 1909.
- Choreographer: Lev Ivanov (1887); Marius Petipa (revival, 1889)
- Music: Riccardo Drigo
- Libretto: Lev Ivanov
- Premiere: 5 April [O.S. 24 March] 1887; Imperial Ballet School; 15 May [O.S. 3 May] 1887; Imperial Mariinsky Theatre
- Design: Orest Allegri
- Type: Ballet fantastique

La Forêt enchantée (en. The Enchanted Forest) (ru. «Очарованный лес», Ocharovanyi les) is a ballet fantastique in one act, originally choreographed by Lev Ivanov to the music of Riccardo Drigo, first presented by students of the Imperial Ballet School in St. Petersburg, Russia, at the school's theatre on 5 April [O.S. 24 March] 1887.

== History ==
La Forêt enchantée was originally produced for the Imperial Ballet School's annual graduation performances. The ballet was Lev Ivanov's first original work after having recently been appointed second maître de ballet to the St. Petersburg Imperial Theatres. The ballet was also the composer and conductor Riccardo Drigo's first complete score for a full-length ballet.

La Forêt enchantée was soon transferred to the repertory of the Imperial Ballet. The first performance was given on 15 May [O.S. 3 May] 1887 at the Imperial Mariinsky Theatre on a bill with Jules Perrot's ballet La naïade et le pêcheur.

Riccardo Drigo's score was received positively. The critic for the newspaper The New Time reviewed that " ... the music of this ballet is outstanding in a symphonic sense, reveals an experienced composer, a man with taste, and an excellent orchestrator. There are beautiful melodies in it, the rhythms are not overdone, and everything is listened to with pleasure from beginning to end." The score was eventually published in 1909 in piano reduction and orchestral partition by the music publisher Zimmerman.

La Forêt enchantée was performed with regularity on the stage of the Mariinsky Theatre, becoming a favorite of many ballerinas at the turn-of-the 20th century. La Forêt enchantée was performed for the last time during the Imperial Ballet's summer season at Krasnoe Selo on 15 June [O.S. 2 June] 1907.

In March 2026 the Centro de Dança do Porto presented a reconstructed version of the ballet from historical documents staged by Juan Bockamp.

== Synopsis ==
In an old forest in Hungary, Ilka walks with her friends. Suddenly they are taken unawares by a storm. In the confusion Ilka is separated from her friends and cannot find her way out of the forest. As the storm rages on, she becomes frightened and falls faint. She is then discovered by dryads and other forest creatures who take delight in her beauty, but they frighten her upon awakening. The Genie of the Forest enters and soon falls in love with Ilka. With the aid of the forest creatures, the Genie begs Ilka to become his queen. Upon learning that she has a human fiancé, the Genie threatens her and she falls faint again. Mortals are now approaching and the forest creatures withdraw. Peasants find Ilka. Among them is Josy, her intended, to whom she recounts her experiences with the Genie of the Forest. The ballet ends with rejoicing and dances.

== Résumé of scenes and dances ==
Taken from the published piano score of 1909 and Riccardo Drigo's memoirs.

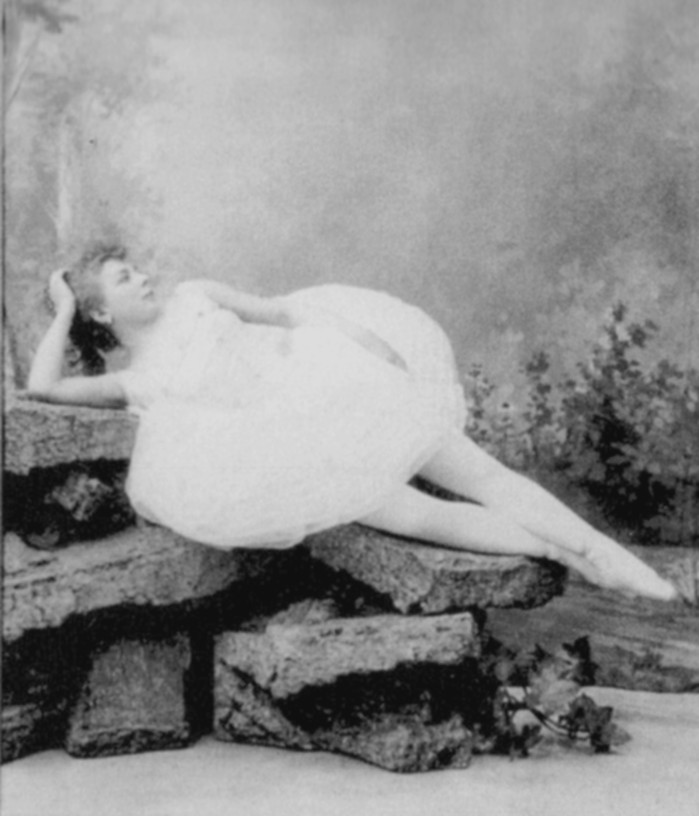
The ballerina Maria Anderson costumed as Ilka in La Forêt enchantée. St. Petersburg, 1892.

Ballet fantastique in one act

- № 01 Danse des Dryads
- № 02 Danse scènique
- № 03 Danse des petits Génies
- № 04 Pas d'action
- № 05 Variation de la Première danseuse
- № 06 Coda-valse
- № 07 Csárdás
