= La Perle (ballet) =

1896 ballet by Marius Petipa

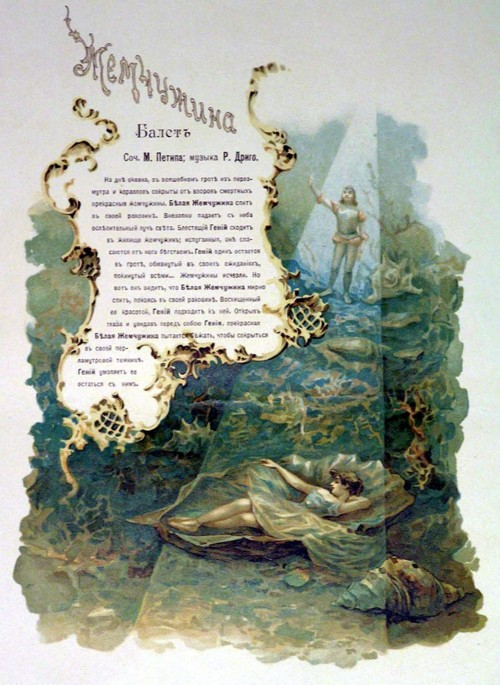
- The first page of the illustrated libretto of La Perle. Taken from the souvenir program of the gala performed at the Bolshoi Theatre of Moscow in celebration of the coronation of Emperor Nicholas II and Empress Alexandra Fyodorovna. 1896.
- Choreographer: Marius Petipa
- Music: Riccardo Drigo
- Libretto: Marius Petipa
- Based on: La Pérégrina: Ballet de la Reine from Verdi's opera Don Carlos
- Premiere: 29 May [O.S. 17 May] 1896; Imperial Bolshoi Theatre, Moscow 15 February [O.S. 3 February] 1898; Imperial Mariinsky Theatre, St. Petersburg
- Design: décor—Pyotr Lambin, after Mikhail Bocharov costumes—Ivan Vsevolozhsky
- Genre: Ballet-divertissement

La Perle (lit. 'The Pearl'; Russian: «Жемчужина» or «Прелестная жемчужина», Zhemchuzhina or Prelestnaya Zhemchuzhina, lit. 'Pearl' or 'Pretty Pearl') is a ballet-divertissement in one act, with libretto and choreography by Marius Petipa and music by Riccardo Drigo.

== History ==
In 1892 Marius Petipa planned to create a one-act ballet originally titled La Perle merveilleuse with a libretto taken almost unchanged from the unperformed danced tableau Ballet de la Reine—"La Pérégrina" from Verdi's opera Don Carlos. The music was commissioned from the St. Petersburg Imperial Ballet's Director of Music and principal conductor Riccardo Drigo, with costumes by the Director of the St. Petersburg Imperial Theatres Ivan Vsevolozhsky and décor by the celebrated designer Pyotr Lambin. Petipa originally intended the starring role of the White Pearl for the ballerina Varvara Nikitina, but for reasons unknown the ballet was shelved.

When a one-act pièce d'occasion of appropriate subject was required for the lavish celebratory gala held at the Imperial Bolshoi Theatre of Moscow in honor of the 1896 coronation of Emperor Nicholas II and Empress Alexandra Fydorovna, Petipa turned to La Perle merveilleuse, now titled simply as La Perle. The ballet had its premiere after a performance of scenes from Mikhail Glinka's opera A Life for the Tsar on 29 May [O.S. 17 May] 1896. The original cast of La Perle featured the highest ranking dancers from the St. Petersburg and Moscow Imperial theatres.

While the ballet was in the early stages of production, a list of potential dancers for inclusion in the cast was created for review by a committee responsible for the coronation and its subsequent celebrations. Among those chosen for consideration in the principal roles was Nicholas II's former mistress, the ballerina Mathilde Kschessinskaya. In light of the history between Kschessinskaya and the new Emperor, his mother the Dowager Empress Marie Fyodorovna demanded that the ballerina be removed from the cast, as it would be considered scandalous for Kschessinskaya to perform in front of the Emperor's new wife, the Empress Alexandra. When Kschessinskaya learned of this, she appealed to the Emperor's uncle, the Grand Duke Vladimir Alexandrovich, whose influence reinstated the ballerina in the cast in spite of the fact that at this point the Ballet Master Petipa and the composer Drigo had completed all of the choreography and music. Petipa became extremely frustrated when he learned that he and Drigo were nonetheless required to compose a number for Kschessinskaya, which took the form of a classical pas de deux for a new character dubbed "La Perle jaune" (the Yellow Pearl) and her suitor, performed by the danseur Nikolai Legat.

La Perle was later transferred to the regular repertory of the Imperial Ballet, where it was first performed on 15 February [O.S. 3 February] 1898 at the Imperial Mariinsky Theatre, St. Petersburg. Marius Petipa would revive the ballet on only one occasion for a gala performance given at Petergof in 1900. La Perle was performed often throughout the 1900s and was given its final performance in 1910.

== Music ==
Riccardo Drigo's score featured an off-stage chorus and a large orchestra consisting of nearly 100 musicians. Contemporary critics praised the score for its rich melodic content and orchestration. Drigo would later admit in his memoirs that he found it challenging to compose the many solo variations for the ballerinas while still maintaining variety.

The Russian pedagogue Konstantin Sergeyev utilized pieces from Drigo's score for La Perle for his class concert for the Vaganova Academy titled School of Classical Dance (or From Landé to Vaganova) (ru. «Школа классического танца (От Ланде до Вагановой)»).

== Synopsis ==
Marius Petipa's libretto was based on the danced tableau La Pérégrina: Ballet de la Reine from Verdi's opera Don Carlos. The scene was omitted before the premiere of the opera, and would have been choreographed by Petipa's brother Lucien.

La Perle is set in a colossal subterranean grotto deep in the sea, where the White Pearl resides with her sister pearls of differing colors. The Genie of the Earth descends to the ocean floor in an attempt to abduct the White Pearl as an adornment for his crown. The King of the Corals comes the White Pearl's aid by causing a battle between the elements of the earth and of the sea. The Genie of the Earth succeeds in capturing the White Pearl, and the King of the Corals thereupon orders all of the ocean denizens to salute the Genie of the Earth side by side with the White Pearl. In an apotheosis, the Triumph of Amphitrite and Poseidon is depicted.

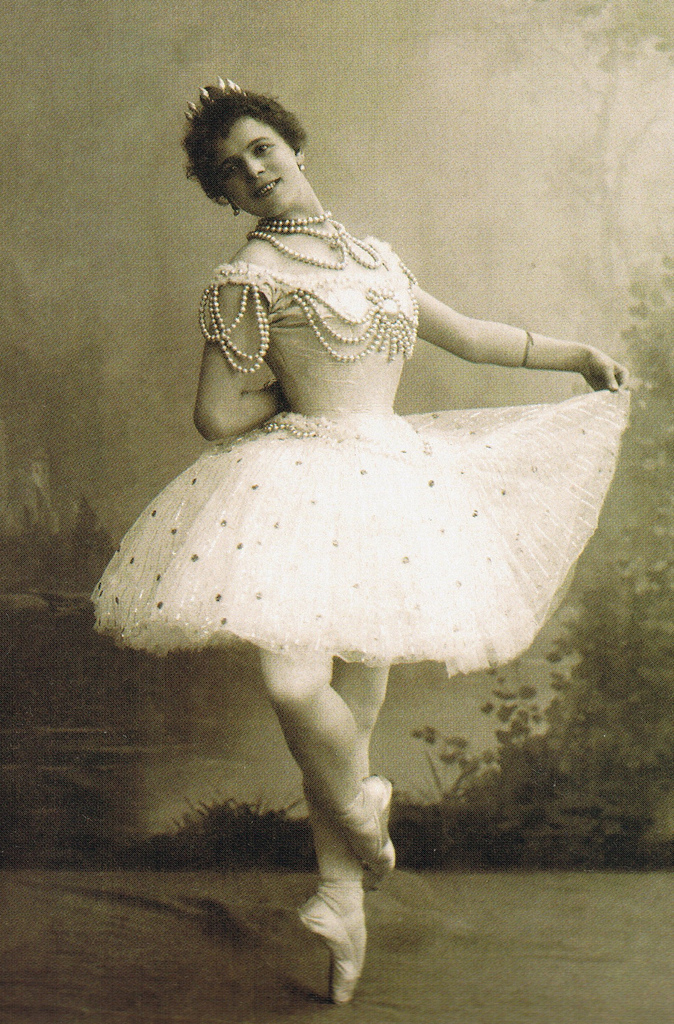
Photograph of the Italian ballerina Pierina Legnani costumed as the White Pearl. Moscow, 1896.

== Original cast ==
Role	Moscow 1896
The White Pearl	Pierina Legnani
The Genie of the Earth	Pavel Gerdt
The King of the Corals	Nikolai Aistov
The Pink Pearls	Adelaide Giuri & Lyubov Roslavleva
The Black Pearls	Anna Johansson & Claudia Kulichevskaya
Pas de deux of the Yellow Pearl	Mathilde Kschessinskaya & Nikolai Legat

== Résumé of scenes and dances ==
Taken from the program for the coronation gala of 1896 and from Riccardo Drigo's memoirs.

Divertissement-ballet in one act

- No. 01 Danse des perles
- No. 02 Scène dansante
- No. 03 Combat des coraux et métaux
- No. 04 Pas de deux
- No. 05 Grand pas d'ensemble
- No. 06 Danse pyrrhique des armées du Roi corail, du Génie de la terre, et des perles
- No. 07 Apothéose: La triomphe d'Amphitrite et de Poséidon

== Gallery ==
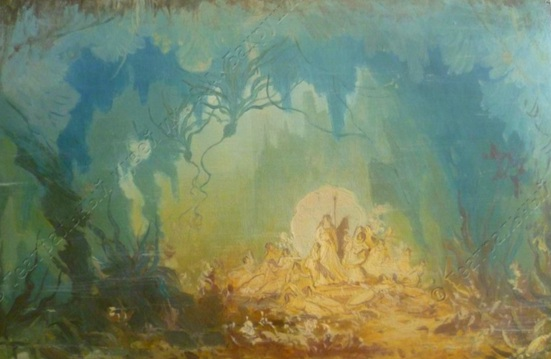
Design for the décor of La Perle by Mikhail Bocharov.

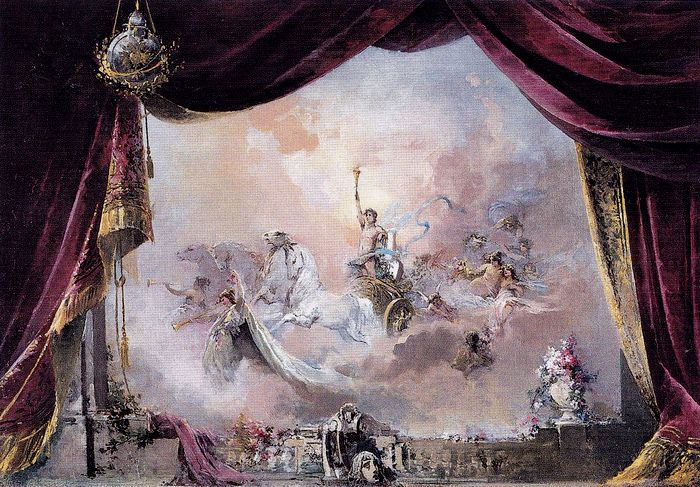
Design for the curtain used during the performance of La Perle at the coronation gala of 1896.

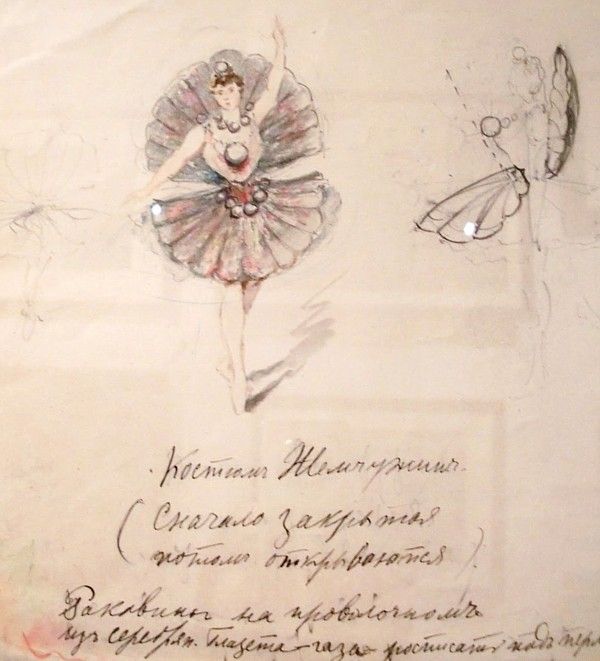
Costume design for one of the pearls by Ivan Vsevolozhsky.

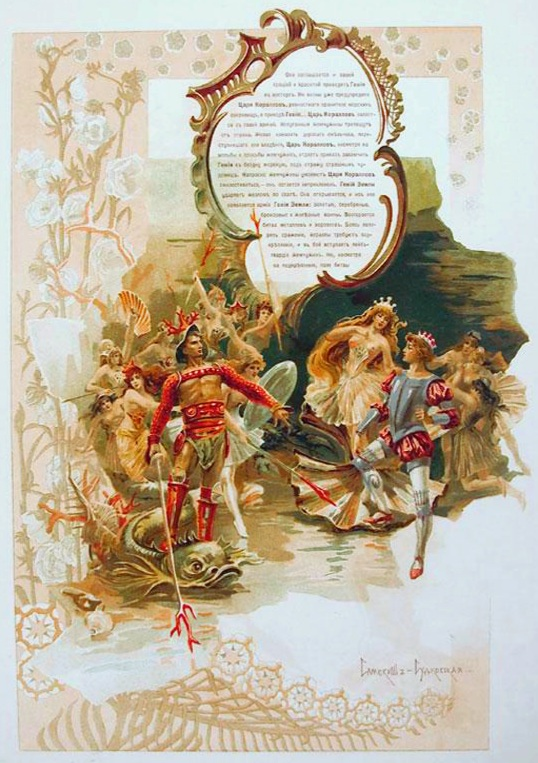
Page from the illustrated program.

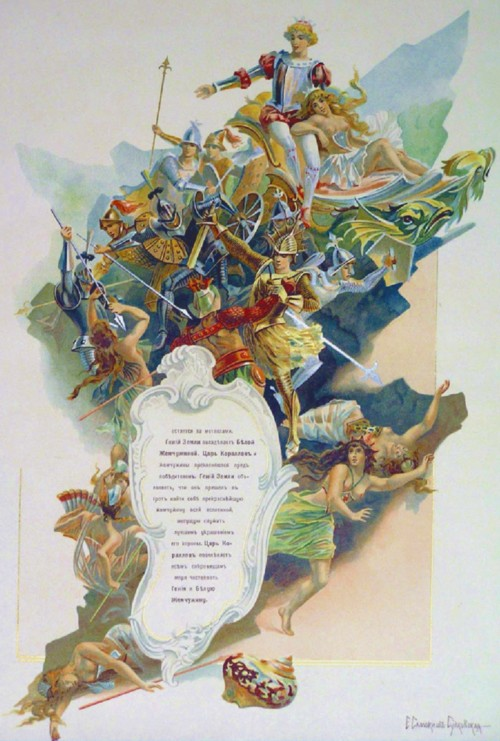
Page from the illustrated program representing the battle between the denizens of the Ocean and the Earth.

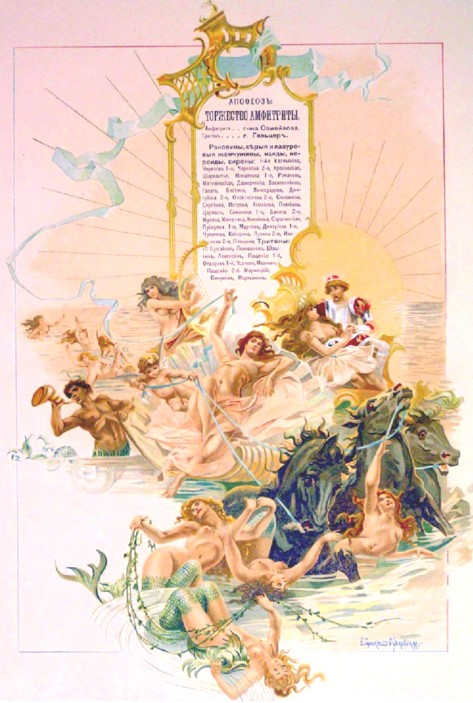
Page from the illustrated program representing the apotheosis of Amphitrite and Poseidon.
