= Les millions d'Arlequin =

1900 ballet by Marius Petipa

Les Millions d'Arlequin, or Harlequinade
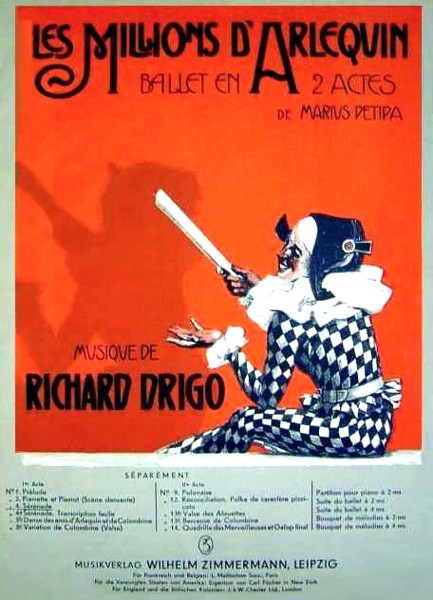
- Frontispiece of the original piano reduction of Drigo's score as issued by the publisher Zimmerman, 1901
- Choreographer: Marius Petipa
- Music: Riccardo Drigo
- Libretto: Marius Petipa
- Based on: episodes from La commedia dell'arte
- Premiere: 23 February [O.S. 11 February] 1900 (Hermitage); 26 February [O.S. 14 February] 1900 (Imperial Mariinsky Theatre)
- Design: décor: Orest Allegri costumes: Ivan Kaffi
- Genre: Ballet comique

Les Millions d'Arlequin (English: Harlequin's Millions) (Russian: "Миллионы Арлекина", Milliony Arlekina) also known under the title Harlequinade (Russian: "Арлекинада", Arlekinada) is a ballet comique in two acts and two tableaux with libretto and choreography by Marius Petipa and music by Riccardo Drigo. Les Millions d'Arlequin was first presented by the Imperial Ballet at the Theatre of the Imperial Hermitage Museum in Saint Petersburg, Russia on 23 February [O.S. 11 February] 1900. The ballet was given a second premiere with the same cast at the Imperial Mariinsky Theatre on 26 February [O.S. 14 February] 1900.

In the principal roles were Mathilde Kschessinskaya as Columbine, Georgy Kyaksht as Harlequin, Olga Preobrajenskaya as Pierrette, Sergei Lukianov as Pierrot, Enrico Cecchetti as Cassandre, Nikolai Aistov as Leandre, and Anna Urakova as the Good Fairy.

The Sérénade from the first act of the ballet became a popular repertory piece that has been arranged for various instruments and recorded on numerous occasions.

== History ==
Ivan Vsevolozhsky took up the directorship of the Imperial Hermitage Museum in 1899, a post that required supervision over performances given at the museum's theatre. Vsevolozhsky commissioned Marius Petipa—Premier maître de ballet of the Saint Petersburg Imperial Theatres—to create three short ballets for the 1900–1901 season that would be performed privately for the imperial Russian court. Petipa crafted the librettos for these ballets himself: the one-act Les Ruses d'amour (The Pranks of Love), with a scenario inspired by French rococo; the one-act Les Saisons (The Seasons), a ballet-divertissement featuring dance episodes inspired by the four seasons; and Les Millions d'Arlequin, a two-act work based on the stock characters from the Italian Commedia dell'arte.

Les Millions d'Arlequin was first performed on a double bill after two acts of Alexander Serov's opera Judith at the Theatre of the Hermitage Museum on 23 February [O.S. 11 February] 1900. In the principal roles were Mathilde Kschessinskaya as Columbine, Georgy Kyaksht as Harlequin, Olga Preobrajenskaya as Pierrette, Sergei Lukianov as Pierrot, Enrico Cecchetti as Cassandre, Nikolai Aistov as Leandre, and Anna Urakova as the Good Fairy.

This performance was a private occasion given for the Imperial Russian court. Among the audience was the Emperor Nicholas II, the Empress Alexandra, and the Dowager Empress Maria. Private royal theatrical performances of that time were extremely formal affairs where rigid etiquette and protocol were strictly adhered to, and as such applause or cheering were not permitted. Nevertheless, within moments of the final curtain the typically subdued royal audience began to applaud, with the ballet master Petipa and the cast receiving an enthusiastic ovation as they took their bows. Much to the surprise of everyone present, the composer Drigo received such a reception after the performance that he was mobbed by several princes and Grand Dukes who tripped over one another in their enthusiasm to congratulate him for his music.

The Empress Alexandra admired the ballet, and commanded two additional court performances, this time on the stage of the Mariinsky Theatre, the first being given on 26 February [O.S. 14 February] 1900. Riccardo Drigo was encouraged by his colleagues to officially dedicate his score for Les Millions d'Arlequin to the Empress Alexandra as it was being readied for publication by the music publisher Zimmermann. This brought about an extraordinary correspondence by a committee who were entrusted with investigating whether Drigo's background, character, and work were worthy of a dedication to a Russian Empress. In the end, the dedication was graciously accepted.

Les Millions d'Arlequin became a popular work in the repertory of the Imperial Ballet. Marius Petipa's original production was given its final performances in the 1920s.

=== Later productions ===
In 1933 the ballet master Fyodor Lopukhov staged Les Millions d'Arlequin as Arlekinada for the newly formed Maly Theatre Ballet of Leningrad. Lopukhov's version was a redacted version in one-act with costumes and décor designed by the artist Tatiana Bruni. The premiere on June 6, 1933, was the company's first performance as the Maly Theatre's official dance troupe. Lopukhov's production of Arlekinada is still occasionally performed by the company and was filmed on two occasions for Russian television. Lopukhov's one-act redaction would go on to be staged by various companies and schools throughout Russia and abroad.

=== The New York City Ballet's production by George Balanchine ===
In honor of the 65th anniversary of Les Millions d'Arlequin, George Balanchine created his own version of the ballet for the New York City Ballet as Harlequinade. This production premiered at the New York State Theater in New York City on 4 February 1965 with Patricia McBride as Columbine, Edward Villella as Harlequin, Suki Schorer as Pierrette and Deni Lamont as Pierrot. The New York City Ballet still perform Balanchine's Harlequinade to the present day.

=== Alexei Ratmansky's reconstruction ===
Marius Petipa's choreography for Les Millions d'Arlequin was recorded in the Stepanov method of choreographic notation not long after its premiere in 1900. Today, this notation is part of the Sergeyev Collection at Harvard University. In 2018, the choreographer Alexei Ratmansky utilized the notation of Les Millions d'Arlequin to create a new version of the Imperial Ballet's original production for American Ballet Theatre. The designer Robert Perdziola recreated décor and costumes based on the ballet's original production of 1900. Ratmansky's production premiered on June 4, 2018, at the Metropolitan Opera House. The production was successful and was later staged for the Australian Ballet in 2022.

== Publication of the music ==
After the premiere of Les Millions d'Arlequin in 1900, plans were underway by the music publisher Zimmermann to issue Riccardo Drigo's score in both piano reduction and orchestral partition. Riccardo Drigo recounts in his memoirs of how his colleagues urged the composer to dedicate his score to the Empress Alexandra. This required the composer to submit a request for the dedication to the Minister of the Imperial Court, which brought about a lengthy correspondence by a commission set up to investigate whether or not the composer's character and background were worthy of his offering a dedication to a Russian Empress. In the end the response was favorable and the dedication was graciously accepted.

== The "Sérénade" ==
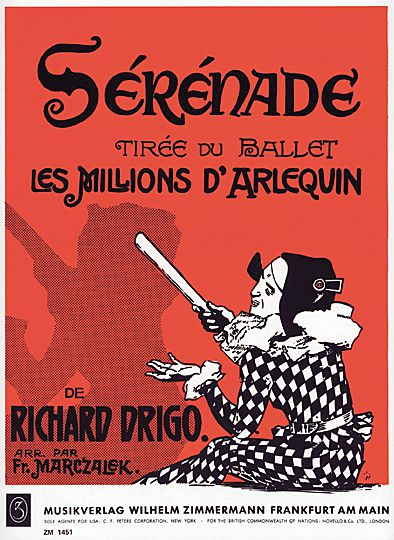
Frontispiece for the piano reduction of the Sérénade from Riccardo Drigo's score for Les Millions d'Arlequin as issued by the music publisher Zimmermann, 1901

The first act of Les Millions d'Arlequin includes a scene called La Sérénade where the character Columbine appears on the balcony of her house and is serenaded from the street by the character Harlequin and his friends.

The music became a popular excerpt in its own right and would go on to become a staple of Edwardian Era salon music/light music. The piece was published in several arrangements for various instruments under many different titles such as Valse Boston or Serenatina veneziana (Venetian Serenade). The Sérénade was among the pieces in the White Star Line songbook, and was played by the Musicians of the RMS Titanic.

The Sérénade was later adapted into the song Notturno d'amore (Nocturne of Love) by the lyricist S. Focacci in 1922. The Italian tenor Beniamino Gigli made a worldwide hit with his recording of the song in 1926.

== Résumé of dances ==
Taken from the original programme for the premiere of the ballet at the Hermitage Museum, 1900.

Act I

- No. 01 Prélude
- No. 02 La clef dérobée
- No. 03 Ballabile par une compagnie de masques
- No. 04 La sérénade
- No. 05 Le rendezvous des amoureux (Pas d'ensemble)—

—a. Andante
—b. Danse des amis de Columbine et d'Arlequin
—c. Variation pour Columbine

- No. 06 La batte enchantée

Act II

- No. 07 Polonaise
- No. 08 Arlequinade: Ballabile des enfants—

—a. Danse des Polichinelles
—b. Danse des Arlequins et Columbines
—c. Danse des Pierrots et Pierrettes
—d. Danse des Scaramouches
—e. Coda du ballabile des enfants

- No. 09 Pizzicato: La réconciliation de Pierrot avec Pierrette
- No. 10 La chasse aux alouettes (Pas d'action)—

—a. Entrée
—b. Andante
—c. Valse des alouettes
—d. Variation pour Arlequin
—e. Berceuse: Variation pour Columbine
—f. Coda du pas des alouettes

- No. 11 Quadrille des merveilleuses et galop final ("Marlborough s'en va-t-en fuerre", vieille chanson populaire française)

== Gallery ==
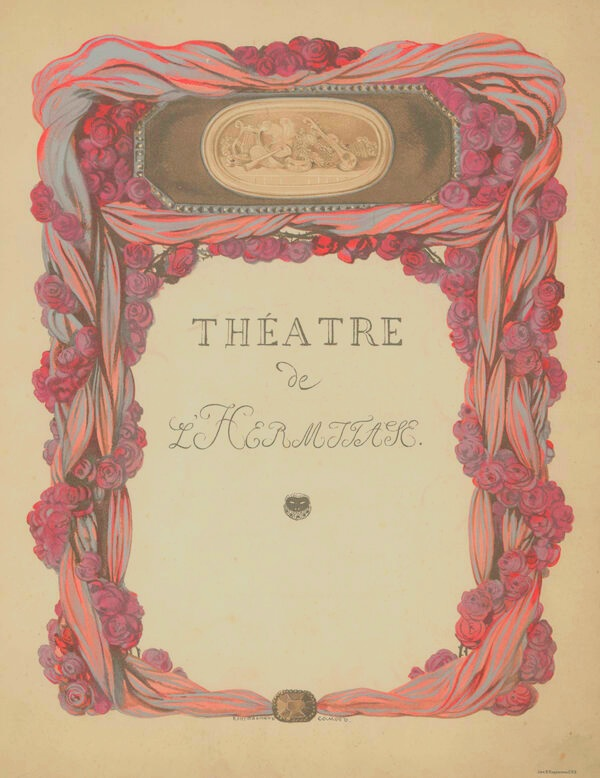
Program for the first performance of Les Millions d'Arlequin at the Theatre of the Hermitage Museum. 1900.

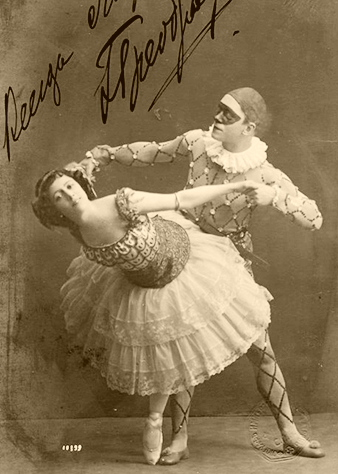
Olga Preobrazhenskaya as Columbine and Nikolai Legat as Harlequin in their costumes for the Grand pas des alouettes of Act II. St. Petersburg, 1913.

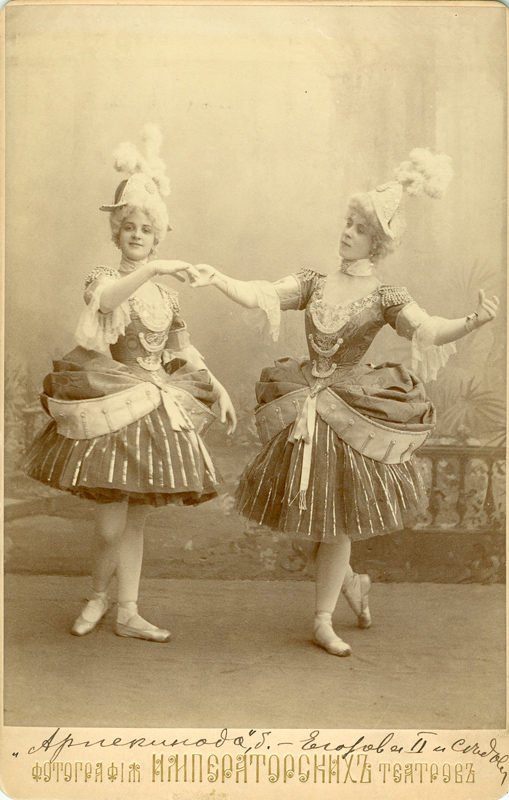
Lyubov Egorova (left) and Julia Sedova (right) costumed for the Pizzicato of act II. St. Petersburg, 1900.

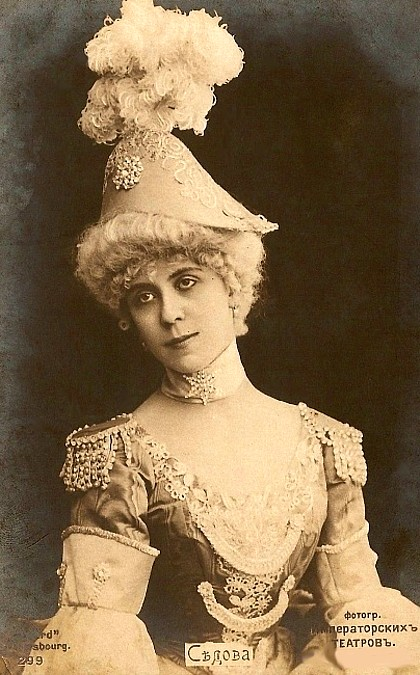
Julia Sedova costumed for the Pizzicato of Act II. Saint Petersburg, 1900.

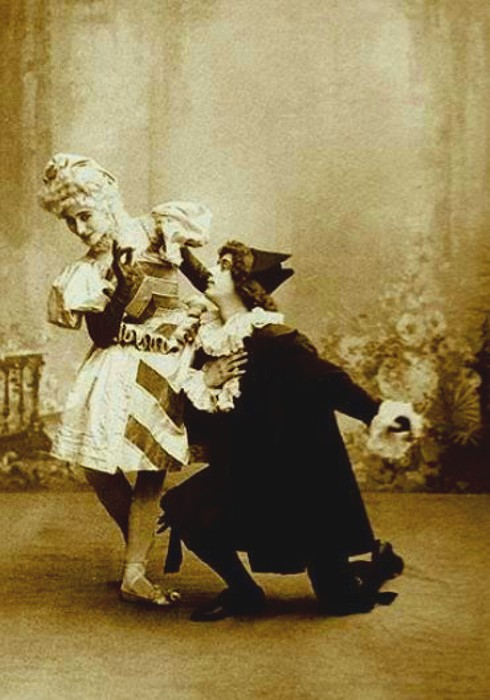
Anna Pavlova and Mikhail Fokine costumed as friends of Harlequin and Columbine for the Sérénade of act I. St. Petersburg, 1900.

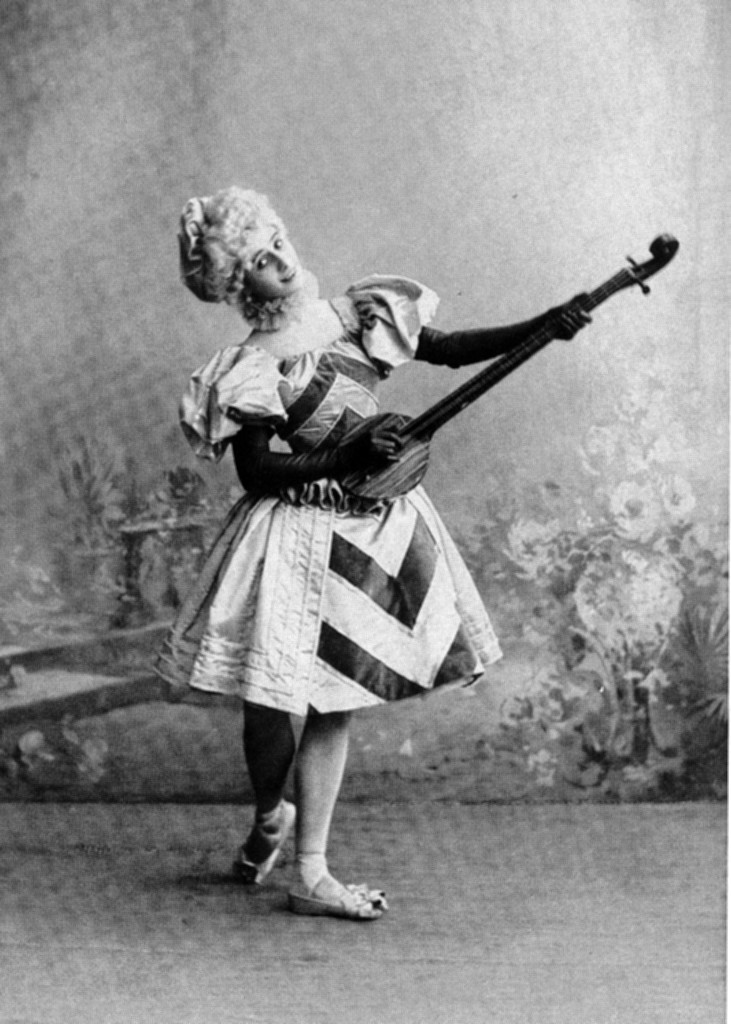
Anna Pavlova costumed as a friend of Harlequin and Columbine for the Sérénade of act I. St. Petersburg, 1900.

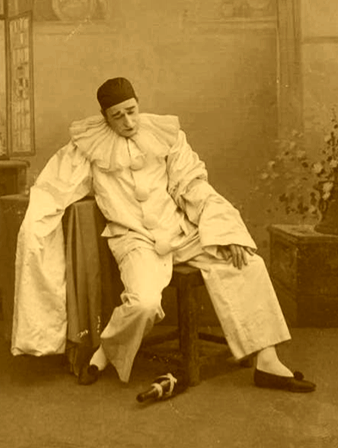
Sergei Lukianov as Pierrot. St. Petersburg, 1900.

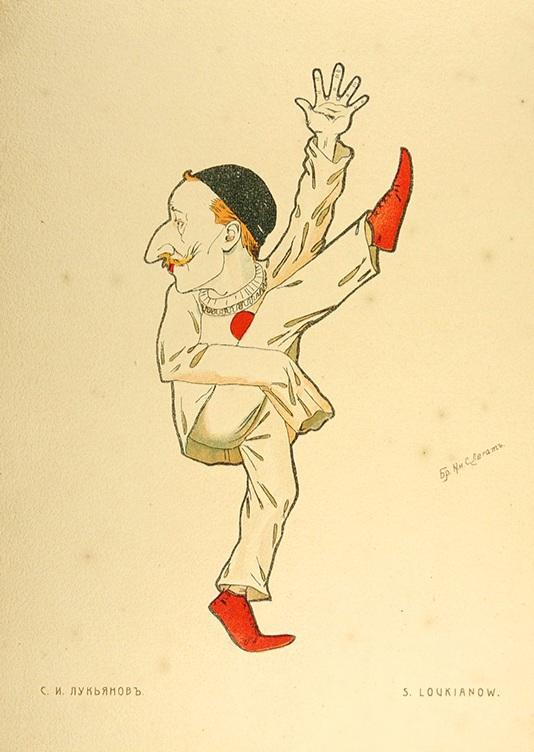
Caricature of Sergei Lukianov as Pierrot in Les Millions d'Arlequin by the brothers Nikolai and Sergei Legat for their book The Russian Ballet In Caricature, 1903.
