= Alexander Gorsky =

Russian ballet choreographer (1871–1924)

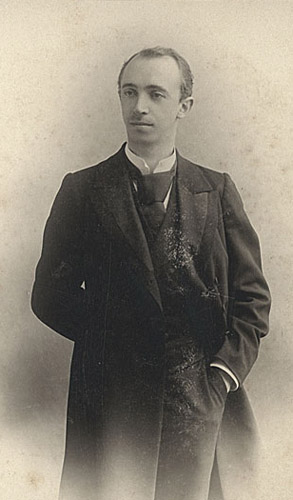
- Gorsky in 1905
- Born: 6 August 1871; Saint Petersburg, Russia
- Died: 20 October 1924 (aged 53); Moscow, Soviet Union
- Education: Imperial Ballet School
- Occupations: Ballet master; choreographer; ballet dancer

Alexander Alekseyevich Gorsky (Russian: Александр Алексеевич Горский; August 6, 1871 – October 20, 1924) was a Russian ballet dancer and choreographer and a contemporary of Marius Petipa, known for restaging Petipa's classical ballets such as Swan Lake, Don Quixote, and The Nutcracker.

Gorsky "sought greater naturalism, realism, and characterization" in ballet. He valued acting skills over bravura technique (a showy display of skills such as many turns or high jumps). His interpretations of ballets were often controversial and he often used artists outside the dance world to create sets and costumes. The victim of deteriorating mental health in his later life, he died in a mental hospital.

== Early life ==
The Russian ballet choreographer Alexander Gorsky was born August 6, 1871, outside of St. Petersburg, Russia. When he turned eight his parents hoped to send him to the School of Commerce and his sister to the Imperial Ballet School both in St. Petersburg. After being accepted to the School of Commerce he went along with his sister to the Imperial School of Ballet. Officials of the school insisted he also be a student there as well as his sister. His parents accepted and Alexander became a student at the Imperial Ballet School.

== Early career ==
Gorsky was taught by Platon K. Karsavin (father of Tamara Karsavina), N. I. Volkov, and Marius Petipa. Upon graduation of the ballet school he joined the company and moved up in rank from corps de ballet, coryphée (a dancer who performs in small ensembles), to solo dancer. He danced roles in La Fille mal gardée, the La Flûte magique, and Le Réveil de Flore.

In 1895, Alexander Gorsky developed a friendship with V.I. Stepanov who was creating a system of dance notation. Upon Stepanov's death Gorsky perfected Stepanov's system and was later appointed to teach it to students of the Imperial Ballet School. Stepanov's system was utilized by the Imperial Ballet to document much of the company's repertory. Today this cache of notation is included in the Sergeyev Collection.

In 1900, Alexander Gorsky was nominated to be Premier danseur (principal male soloist) of the St. Petersburg Imperial Theatre, only to be moved to the Ballet of the Moscow Imperial Bolshoi Theatre as régisseur (manager) eight days later. What was meant to be a temporary move became permanent. The school was creating many talented students but the company was in decline. Gorsky was named Premier Maître de Ballet of the Imperial Bolshoi Theatre. In his teaching he used " free dance movements in contrast to the academic, frozen forms" of previous classical ballet style. He was inspired by Isadora Duncan who was famous for rejecting ballet and believed dance should be a natural expression of the soul. He was also inspired by Konstantin Stanislavski's 'system' of acting.

== Choreography ==
Alexander Gorsky choreographed, restaged, and revived many ballets. He created many of his own ballets but it was his restaging of Marius Petipa's ballets that have become more well known. Some say he paved the way for Michel Fokine's work. Some of Gorsky's ballets were Gudule's Daughter (ru: Дочь Гудулы) (a revision of the La Esmeralda), Salammbo, Etudes, Dances of the Nations, Eunice and Petronius, and Love is Quick.

Of the Bolshoi Theatre's classical repertory Gorsky revived the Petipa/Ivanov version of La Fille mal gardée for the first time in 1903 (Gorsky's version would become the basis for nearly every production staged in Russia and the west for decades), the Petipa/Ivanov revival of Swan Lake in 1901, Petipa's Don Quixote in 1900, La Bayadère (with Vasily Tikhomirov) in 1904, and Raymonda in 1905. He also revised The Nutcracker and Petipa's revival of Arthur Saint-Léon's The Little Humpbacked Horse in 1901.

=== Don Quixote ===
Gorsky staged his revival of Don Quixote in 1900 with musical parts by French composer Antoine Simon, a version he staged for the Imperial Ballet in 1902. Gorsky's production served as the basis for nearly every production staged thereafter.

The largest change that Gorsky made to Petipa's choreography was the action of the corps de ballet. Instead of being a moving background as the corps often is, they became an important part of the drama. They bustled around the stage breaking the symmetry and lines typical of Petipa. Their movement was often culturally relevant, playful, and realistic of a group of people. (Souritz 31) Some fans of ballet thought the new version was a masterpiece and rushed to Moscow to see it. Others such as Alexander Benois thought it was a mess "typical of amateur performances". However "the dynamic, stormy rhythm, and easy lighthearted gaiety of Don Quixote, as we know it today are due in great part to Gorsky".

=== Swan Lake ===
By 1920, Gorsky had made several versions of Swan Lake. Swan Lake had been changed many times and was considerably different from Petipa's and Ivanov's St. Petersburg Ballet's version. He redid the peasants’ waltz from the first act, added character dancing, lost the straight geometric lines of Petipa, and ended the first act with the dancers carrying torches. (Souritz 116) The second act was also changed to be more dramatic. The swans ran in circles and in confused flocks, in a way contemporary critics found intolerable.

=== The Nutcracker ===
It was Gorsky who first thought of turning the fantasy scenes in The Nutcracker into a dream from which Clara awakens at the end. In the original ballet and the story on which it is based, they really occur. Gorsky also changed the story so that the roles of Clara and the Nutcracker/Prince would be danced by adults, rather than children, thereby making the relationship between the two characters a romance rather than just a friendship. Usually Vasili Vainonen receives all the credit for these changes, but it was Gorsky who first thought of them.
