= Riccardo Drigo =

Italian composer (1846–1930)

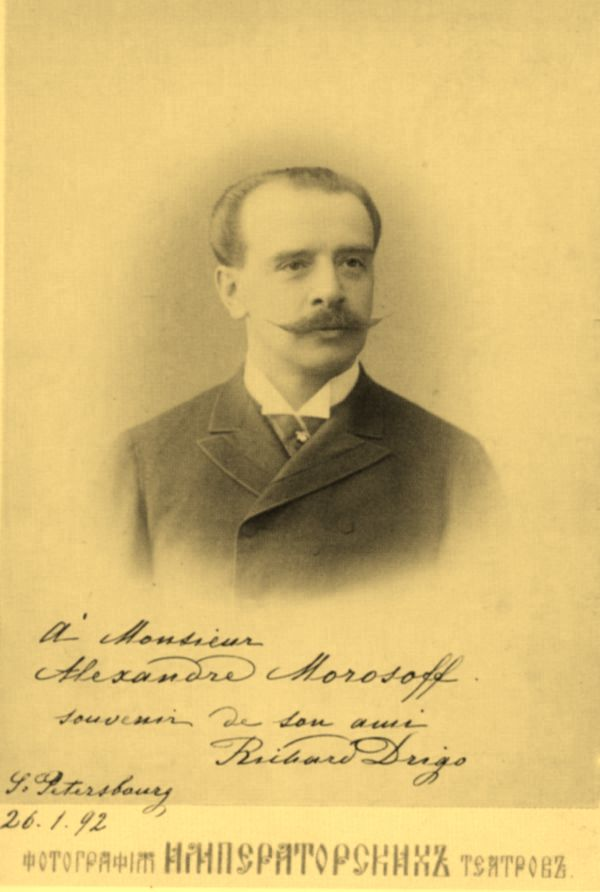
Maestro Riccardo Eugenio Drigo. Saint Petersburg, 1892

Riccardo Drigo (Russian: Риккардо Дриго, romanized: Rikkardo Drigo; 30 June 1846 – 1 October 1930) was an Italian composer of ballet music and Italian opera, a theatrical conductor, and a pianist.

Drigo is noted for his long career as principal Chef d'orchestre/kapellmeister and Music Director of the Imperial Ballet of Saint Petersburg, Russia, for which he composed music for the original works and revivals of the choreographers Marius Petipa and Lev Ivanov. During his career in Saint Petersburg, Drigo conducted the premieres and regular performances of nearly every ballet performed on the Tsarist stage.

Drigo is equally noted for his original full-length compositions for the ballet as well as his large catalog of supplemental music written ad hoc for insertion into already-existing works. Drigo is also noted for his adaptations of already-existing scores, such as his 1895 edition of Pyotr Ilyich Tchaikovsky's score for Swan Lake. Many pieces set to the music of Drigo are still performed today, and are considered cornerstones of the classical ballet repertory.

== Life ==
Riccardo Giuseppe Drigo was born in Padua, Italy on 30 June 1846. His father Silvio Drigo was a barrister and his mother, a noble Lupati, was active in politics. None of Drigo's family was distinguished in music, but at the age of five he began taking his first piano lessons from a family friend, the Hungarian Antonio Jorich. Drigo excelled quickly, and by his early teens he attained some local celebrity as a pianist. His father eventually agreed to allow Drigo to attend the prestigious Venice Conservatory, where he studied under Antonio Buzzolla, a student of Gaetano Donizetti. Drigo scored his first compositions in his early teens, which were primarily romances and waltzes. In 1862 he was allowed to perform some of his pieces with the local amateur orchestra in Padua. Through this performance, the young Drigo began to show interest in conducting.

Drigo obtained his earliest position in an opera house as a rehearsal pianist and copyist to the Garibaldi Theatre, Padua in 1866. His first major opportunity as a theatrical conductor occurred in 1867 when the Garibaldi Theatre's kapellmeister fell ill on the eve of the premiere of Costantino Dall'Argine's three act opera bouffe I Due Orsi (The Two Bears). When the concertmaster refused to conduct the performance, he recommended Drigo, if only because the rehearsal pianist would know the score intimately. Drigo's conducting was successful, and soon he was named second kapellmeister.

In 1878 during the opera season in Padua the director of the Saint Petersburg Imperial Theatres, Baron Karl Karlovich Kister, attended a performance of Donizetti's L'elisir d'amore that Drigo conducted. Kister was much impressed with Drigo's conducting talent, which was done without the aid of a score. Drigo then presented Kister with some of his own compositions, which prompted Kister to offer Drigo a six-month contract to conduct the Saint Petersburg Imperial Italian Opera.

== Russia ==
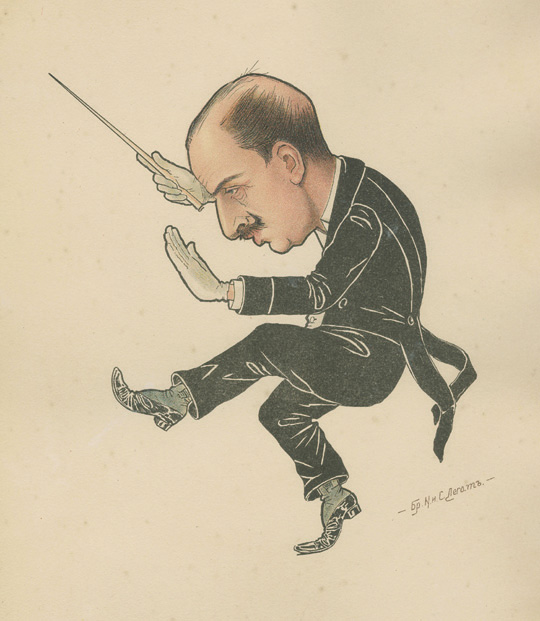
Caricature of Riccardo Drigo from the book The Russian Ballet in Caricatures (Рускій балетъ въ карикатурахъ) by the brothers Νikolai and Sergei Legat.

Almost immediately after arriving in Saint Petersburg, Drigo was conducting the entire repertory of the Imperial Italian Opera, which at that time performed at the Imperial Mariinsky Theatre. He impressed the management a great deal, conducting such works as Verdi's Aida and Un ballo in maschera from memory. It was custom in Imperial Russia for all theatrical performances to be reported in detail in the newspapers, and Drigo's performances were always reported with praise — " ... the young gentleman will stay here a long time ..." commented one columnist after attending an opera that Drigo conducted.

The 1880s saw significant reforms carried out by Ivan Vsevolozhsky, the new director of the Saint Petersburg Imperial Theatres appointed by Emperor Alexander III. In an effort to solidify the art of Russian operetta, the Emperor disbanded the Imperial Italian Opera in 1884. Drigo had served as the troupe's kapellmeister, but with its demise he found himself without a position.

In 1886 the Saint Petersburg Imperial Ballet's longtime kapellmeister, Alexei Papkov, retired after thirty-four years of service, leaving the company without a principal conductor. The director chose Drigo to take over the position before the beginning of the 1886–1887 season. Drigo made his debut as a conductor of ballet on 7 October [O.S. 25 September] 1886 with a performance of the old grand ballet The Pharaoh's Daughter, by Cesare Pugni. As it was the most popular work in the repertory of the Imperial Ballet, expectations ran high. In attendance for the performance was the Emperor and the Empress Maria Fyodorovna, both of whom were fanatic balletomanes and maintained the Imperial Theatres lavishly.

The Imperial Theatre's official composer of ballet music, the Austrian Ludwig Minkus, retired from his post in 1886. The director of the Saint Petersburg Imperial Theatres, Ivan Vsevolozhsky then abolished the position of staff ballet composer in an effort to diversify the music supplied for new works. Since Drigo was well known as a composer, Vsevolozhsky employed him in the dual capacity of kapellmeister and Director of Music, a position that would require Drigo to fulfill all of the duties of the staff composer with regard to adapting and correcting scores at the behest of the Ballet Master.

Pizzicato, composed for the ballerina Anna Johansson (1:20)

Valse lente: Variation d'Esmeralda, composed for the ballerina Virginia Zucchi, 1886 (1:35)
Pre-1917 recordings of two of Drigo's supplemental numbers for La Esmeralda.

The Imperial Theatre's renowned Premier Maître de Ballet, the Frenchman Marius Petipa, revived Jules Perrot's 1841 romantic masterpiece La Esmeralda for the visiting Italian ballerina Virginia Zucchi in 1886. For the revival Drigo was assigned the task of refurbishing Cesare Pugni's old score. Drigo was commissioned to compose a four-part Pas d'action to showcase the dramatic gifts of the ballerina Zucchi that also included virtuoso solos for violin and cello, with the violin solo crafted especially for the great Leopold Auer, principal violinist in the Imperial Theatre's orchestra. The revival of La Esmeralda premiered to great success on 29 December [O.S. 17 December] 1886 with the Imperial family in attendance. Drigo's Pas d'action remains part of the performance score for La Esmeralda to the present day, and is often extracted from the full-length work as La Esmeralda Pas de Six.

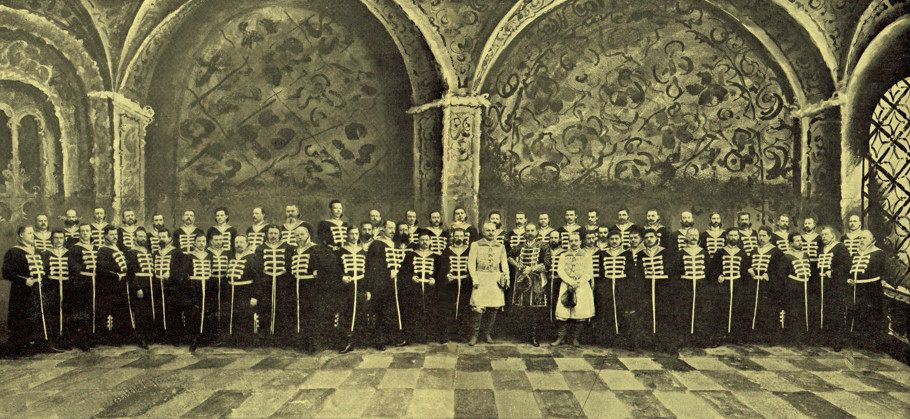
Photograph of Drigo (person to right wearing white) and orchestra of Imperial Mariinsky Theatre from the Yearbook of the Imperial Theatres. Saint Petersburg, ca. 1905

With the success of his work on the score of La Esmeralda, the director Vsevolozhsky gave Drigo his first commission to compose a complete ballet score. This was La Forêt enchantée (The Enchanted Forest), which was not only Drigo's first full-length ballet but also the first original work choreographed by the Imperial Theatre's newly appointed second Maître de Ballet Lev Ivanov. La Forêt enchantée was staged especially for the annual graduation performance of the Imperial Ballet School, with the top graduates in the leading roles. The work premiered on 5 April [O.S. 24 March] 1887 on the stage of the school's theatre, and was subsequently transferred to the stage of the Mariinsky Theatre, where it premiered on 1 June [O.S. 20 May] 1887 with the Italian ballerina Emma Bessone in the lead role of Ilka. Although Ivanov's choreography was not well-received, Drigo's score was highly praised. A critic from the Saint Petersburg newspaper The New Time reviewed that

...the music of this ballet is outstanding in a symphonic sense, reveals an experienced composer, a man with taste, and an excellent orchestrator. There are beautiful melodies in it, the rhythms are not overdone, and everything is listened to with pleasure from beginning to end.

In 1888 Marius Petipa was preparing his next work, La Vestale, set in the ancient Roman Empire. The score was written by the music critic Mikhail Ivanov, who provided what was at that time considered to be a highly symphonic score for ballet. The work was produced for the Italian Elena Cornalba, who appealed to Petipa for additional, more dansante music for her solo numbers. Having just witnessed a performance of La Forêt enchantée, she requested that Drigo should be the composer responsible for the supplemental dances she required. Drigo composed two additional variations for Cornalba known as L'echo (The Echo), which was written as a canon; and a Valse mignonne (Sweet Waltz). Drigo also wrote an extra variation for the character of Cupid known as L'amour, and a variation for the ballerina Maria Gorshenkova. Three of these pieces were later published.

=== Le Talisman ===
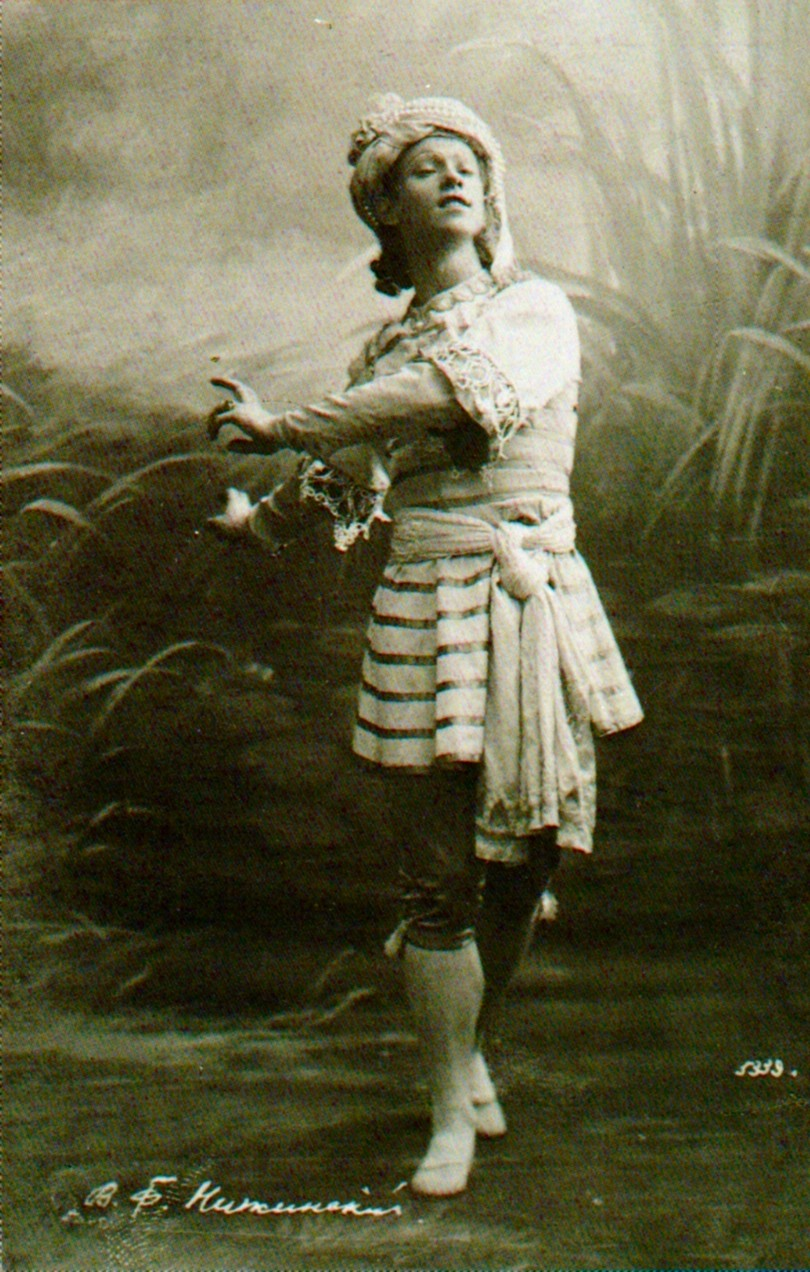
Vaslav Nijinsky costumed as the God Vayou in Nikolai Legat's revival of the Drigo/Petipa Le Talisman. Saint Petersburg, 1909

When plans were made for the next ballet starring Elena Cornalba, the ballerina requested that Drigo should be the composer responsible for the entire score. This was Le Talisman (The Talisman), a work that told the story of a Hindu goddess who descends from heaven to test her heart against the temptations of earthly love. The ballet premiered on 6 February [O.S. 25 January] 1889 on the occasion of Cornalba's benefit performance. Despite a sumptuous production with many inspired choreographic episodes, the ballet's plot was something that critics and audiences alike found tedious. Nevertheless, Drigo's score was hailed as a masterwork of ballet music by contemporary critics. The artist Alexander Benois told in his memoirs of his extreme delight with Drigo's score, which he said inspired a "short infatuation" in him as a young student at Saint Petersburg State University:

It was Drigo's simple and charming music that had attracted me (to Petipa's Le Talisman). In fact (I) had been so delighted with it at the premiere that I could not stop applauding and even felt compelled to exclaim "Mais puisque, excellence, c'est un chef-d'œuvre!"

In the ensuing years, Drigo repeatedly received commissions from both Marius Petipa and Lev Ivanov to compose supplemental variations, pas and incidental dances for insertion into older ballets. By the time Drigo left Russia in 1919, nearly every ballet in the repertory of the Saint Petersburg Imperial Theatres contained many of the composer's own additional pieces. Drigo later commented in his memoirs that he composed about 80 such pieces, and rarely received any additional payment for them. During the late 19th century, Petipa began to mount revivals of older ballets with increasing frequency, and the ballet master invariably called upon Drigo to revise and supplement the scores accordingly.

Drigo took up residence in the Saint Petersburg Grand Hotel in 1889, which was to remain his home for the next thirty years. It was at this time that Drigo developed a close friendship with Pyotr Ilyich Tchaikovsky, who was in the process of composing the score for Petipa's The Sleeping Beauty. On the eve of the general rehearsal of the ballet Drigo fell ill, and asked Tchaikovsky if he could conduct the orchestra himself. To Drigo's astonishment Tchaikovsky insisted that if he conducted the orchestra he would ruin his score, and so Drigo, still ill, consented to conduct the rehearsal. The shy and reserved Tchaikovsky was ever after grateful to Drigo for his exceptional conducting, particularly after the premiere on 3 January 1890 [O.S. 22 December 1889]. Drigo eventually conducted nearly 300 performances of The Sleeping Beauty at the Mariinsky Theatre. Two years later Drigo conducted the premiere of Tchaikovsky's next work, The Nutcracker, on 18 December [O.S. 6 December] 1892.

=== La Flûte magique and Le Réveil de Flore ===
Drigo composed another score for the annual graduation performance of the Imperial Ballet school in 1893. This was the one-act ballet La Flûte magique (The Magic Flute), which told the story of an enchanted instrument that compelled all within earshot to dance when it was played. The ballet was staged by Lev Ivanov, and premiered on 4 February [O.S. 23 January] 1893 to great success on the stage of the ballet school's theatre. Among the cast was a young Mikhail Fokine in the lead role of Luc. Due to the success of the student performance, La Flûte magique was transferred to the Mariinsky Theatre, where it was presented in an expanded staging on 23 April [O.S. 11 April] 1893. Drigo's score was highly praised by critics:

Mr. Drigo astounds the listener with his ability to create a near limitless variety of beautiful dansante rhythms and melodies, all the while including rich, almost symphonic orchestration.

Drigo's next score was written for Petipa's ballet Le Réveil de Flore (The Awakening of Flora), an anacreontic ballet in one-act that was produced especially for the celebrations held at Peterhof Palace in honor of the wedding of the Grand Duchess Xenia Alexandrovna to the Grand Duke Alexander Mikhailovich. The premiere on 6 August [O.S. 25 July] 1894 was a grand occasion, with an audience composed of the whole of the Imperial court. For his score for Le Réveil de Flore, Emperor Alexander III granted Drigo the Order of St. Anna.

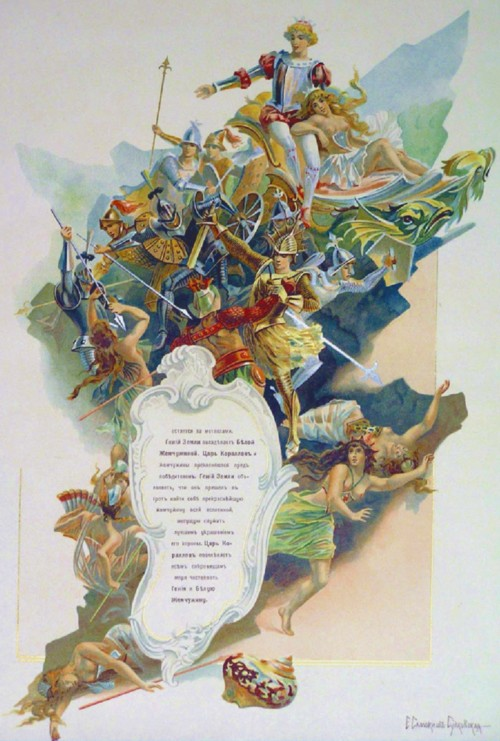
Page from the illustrated libretto for Riccardo Drigo's ballet La Perle, taken from the program for the celebrations held at the Imperial Bolshoi Theatre of Moscow in honor of the coronation of Tsar Nicholas II and Empress Alexandra Fyodorovna. 29 May [O.S. 17 May] 1896

As with La Flûte magique, Le Réveil de Flore was transferred to the stage of the Mariinsky Theatre, where it was given for the first time on 20 January [O.S. 8 January] 1894. The ballet soon became a favorite of the ballerinas of the era, among them Mathilde Kschessinska (who created the principal role of Flora), Tamara Karsavina and particularly Anna Pavlova, who included an abridged version of the work on her legendary world tours.

=== Swan Lake ===
In late 1894 Drigo prepared an important revision of Tchaikovsky's score for Swan Lake, originally produced at the Imperial Bolshoi Theatre of Moscow in 1877. Following the success of The Sleeping Beauty and The Nutcracker, Ivan Vsevolozhsky—director of the Saint Petersburg Theatres—expressed interest in reviving the ballet. Drigo later recalled:

...I knew of (Tchaikovsky's) dissatisfaction with the instrumentation of (Swan Lake), and that he intended to take up the matter, but he never managed to do this.

Tchaikovsky died on 6 November [O.S. 25 October] 1893 just as plans to revive Swan Lake were beginning to come to fruition. A revival of the complete work was then planned for the Imperial Ballet's 1894–1895 season, in a staging by Marius Petipa and Lev Ivanov. Tchaikovsky's brother Modest approved that Drigo should be entrusted with the task of revising the score, which the composer did in accordance with Petipa's instructions. In his memoirs Drigo touched on his revision to the score:

...it was my lot, like a surgeon, to perform an operation on Swan Lake, and I feared that I might not grasp the individuality of the great Russian master.

The revival premiered on 27 January [O.S. 15 January] 1895 at the Mariinsky Theatre with the Prima ballerina assoluta Pierina Legnani in the dual role of Odette/Odile. Drigo's version of Tchaikovsky's score has remained the definitive performance edition of Swan Lake, and is still used to one degree or another by ballet companies throughout the world. Nevertheless, Drigo is rarely given credit when his revisions are performed.

=== La Perle ===
Drigo's next score for the ballet was the grand pièce d'occasion La Perle (sometimes known in Russian as Прелестная жемчужина — Pretty Pearl), produced especially for the gala held at the Imperial Bolshoi Theatre of Moscow in honor of the coronation of Tsar Nicholas II and Empress Alexandra Fyodorovna. The ballet premiered on 29 May [O.S. 17 May] 1896 after a performance of Glinka's A Life for the Tsar

=== Les Millions d'Arlequin ===
In 1899 Petipa began work on the scenario for a ballet based on episodes from the Italian commedia dell’arte, which he called Les Millions d'Arlequin (The Millions of Harlequin). The ballet premiered at the Imperial Theatre of the Hermitage on 23 February [O.S. 11 February] 1900 with Mathilde Kschessinska in the role of Columbine and the danseur Gyorgy Kyaksht in the role of Harlequin. The audience included the Emperor and Empress and the entire Imperial court. Within moments of the final curtain, the typically subdued courtly audience erupted into thunderous applause. The composer received a tumultuous reception as he went before the curtain and was mobbed by several Grand Dukes who tripped over one another in their enthusiasm to congratulate him for his music.

Due to her delight in Drigo's score, the Empress commanded two additional court performances of Les Millions d'Arlequin on the stage of the Mariinsky Theatre, the first given on 26 February [O.S. 14 February] 1900. When plans were under way to publish Drigo's score in piano reduction by the publisher Zimmermann, many of Drigo's colleagues urged the composer to dedicate his score to the Empress. Drigo's request was then submitted to the Minister of the Imperial Court, which brought about a lengthy correspondence by a commission set up to investigate whether or not Drigo's character, background and music were worthy of his offering a dedication to a Russian Empress. The response was favorable and the dedication was graciously accepted.

== Later years in Russia ==
In the spring of 1902, Drigo and a group of dancers from the Imperial Ballet were invited by Raoul Gunsbourg, director of the Opéra de Monte-Carlo, to produce a ballet in Monaco. Drigo composed the music for the ballet-divertissement titled La Côte d'Azur (The French Riviera), set to a libretto by Prince Albert I. The ballet premiered at the Salle Garnier on 30 March 1902, and featured the Prima ballerina Olga Preobrajenska.

Drigo's final original full-length ballet score was also Marius Petipa's final work – the fantastical La Romance d'un Bouton de rose et d'un Papillon (The Romance of a Rosebud and a Butterfly). The ballet was to have had its premiere at the Imperial Theatre of the Hermitage on 5 February [O.S. 23 January] 1904 but was abruptly canceled, the official reason given being the outbreak of the Russo-Japanese War.

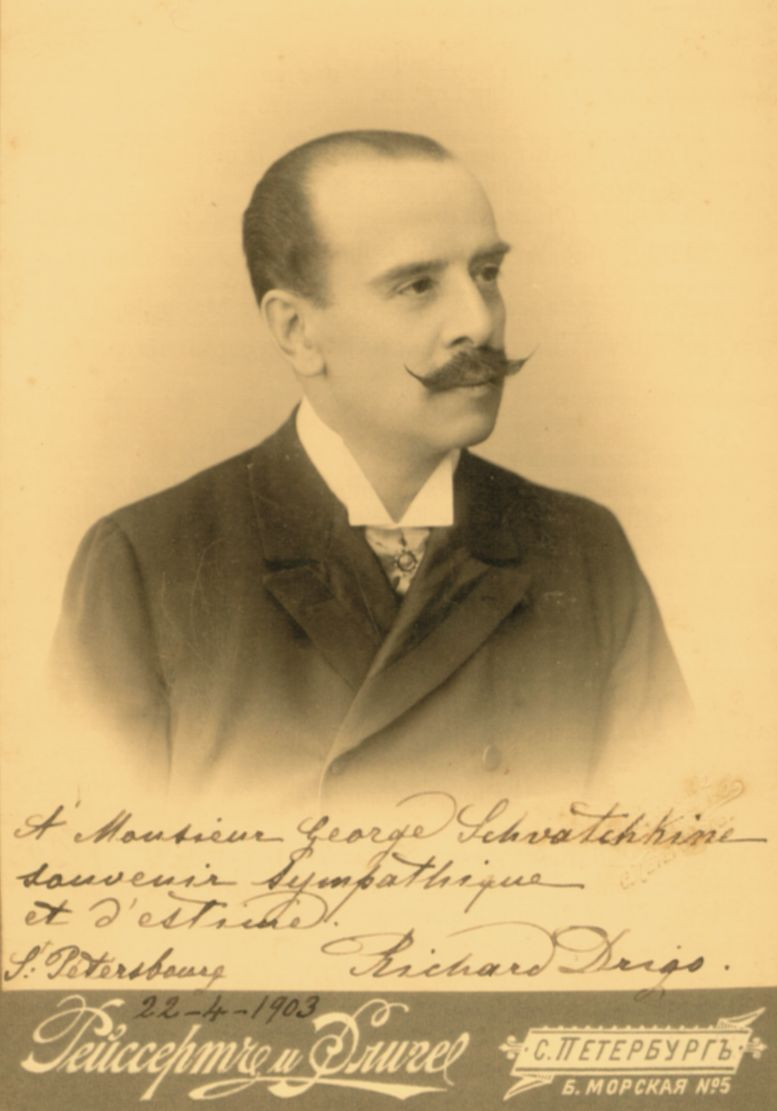
Maestro Riccardo Eugenio Drigo. Saint Petersburg, 1903

Drigo was vacationing in his native Italy during the outbreak of World War I in 1914, which prevented him from returning to Russia for another two years. Soon after his arrival in Petrograd he was evicted from his home at the Grand Hotel, which was converted to offices for the newly established Soviet government. For a time Drigo was forced to live in considerable poverty in a camp with a group of his fellow Italian émigrés. He later recalled in his memoirs of the many cold evenings he spent with his close friend and colleague Alexander Glazunov waiting for hours in bread lines and subsequently carrying their rations home through the snow on a sled. Upon his first engagement as conductor after his return to the former Imperial Mariinsky Theatre, Drigo received a fifteen-minute standing ovation from the audience.

== Drigo returns to Italy ==
In 1919 Drigo was finally repatriated to his native Italy. For his farewell gala at the former Imperial Mariinsky Theatre, the Ballet Master Fyodor Lopukhov mounted a new version of Drigo and Petipa's final collaboration, the ballet La Romance d'un Bouton de rose et d'un Papillon which Lopukhov staged under the title Le Conte du bouton (The Tale of the Rosebud). At the close of the gala, the renowned bass Feodor Chaliapin read an emotional farewell speech in both Italian and Russian. Allowed to take only 60 kilograms with him, Drigo left all of his belongings in Russia with the exception of a collection of his manuscript scores, which he used as a pillow during his two-month journey to Padua via Odessa and Constantinople.

In 1920 Drigo accepted the post of kapellmeister to the Teatro Garibaldi in Padua where he had begun his career many years before. In 1926 he composed the comic opera Flaffy Raffles for the Opera company of Padua's Teatro Verdi, and in 1929 his last work was given, the opera Il garofano bianco (The White Carnation) at the Teatro Garibaldi. He spent the remainder of his life conducting and composing masses and various songs.

Riccardo Drigo died on 1 October 1930 at the age of 84, in his birthplace, Padua. There is now a street in Padua named Via Riccardo Drigo in his honor.

== Works ==
=== Operas ===
- Don Pedro di Portogallo. 25 July 1868, Teatro nuovo di Padova, Padua.
- La Moglie Rapita. 6 March [O.S. 23 February] 1884, Imperial Mariinsky Theatre.
- Flaffy Raffles. ? 1926, Teatro Verdi, Padua.
- Il Garafano Bianco. ? 1929. Garibaldi Theatre, Padua.

=== Ballets ===
- La Forêt enchantée. Ballet fantastique in one act. Choreography by Lev Ivanov. 5 April [O.S. 24 March] 1887, Imperial Ballet School. 15 May [O.S. 3 May] 1887, Imperial Mariinsky Theatre.
- Le Talisman. Grand ballet in four acts and seven tableaux with prologue and apotheosis. Choreography by Marius Petipa. 6 February [O.S. 25 January] 1889, Imperial Mariinsky Theatre.
- La Flûte magique. Ballet comique in one act. Choreography by Lev Ivanov. 4 February [O.S. 23 January] 1893, Imperial Ballet School. 23 April [O.S. 11 April] 1893, Imperial Mariinsky Theatre.
- Le Réveil de Flore. Ballet anacréontique in one act. Choreography by Marius Petipa. 8 August [O.S. 27 July] 1894, Imperial Theatre of Peterhof. 6 August [O.S. 25 July] 1894. 14 January [O.S. 2 January] 1895, Imperial Mariinsky Theatre.
- La Perle. Ballet divertissement in one act with apotheosis. Choreography by Marius Petipa. 29 May [O.S. 17 May] 1896, Imperial Bolshoi Theatre of Moscow. 15 February [O.S. 3 February] 1898, Imperial Mariinsky Theatre.
- Les millions d'Arlequin (a.k.a. Harlequinade). Harlequinade in two acts. Choreography by Marius Petipa. 23 February [O.S. 11 February] 1900, Imperial Theatre of the Hermitage. 26 February [O.S. 14 February] 1900, Imperial Mariinsky Theatre.
- La Roman d'un Bouton de rose et d'un Papillon. Ballet fantastique in one act, two tableaux. Choreography by Marius Petipa. The scheduled premiere of 5 February [O.S. 23 January] 1904 at the Imperial Theatre of the Hermitage was canceled. The ballet was not performed until it was staged by Alexander Chekrygin for Drigo's farewell benefit performance at the Mariinsky Theatre on 16 April 1919.
