= Anna Johansson (dancer) =

Russian ballerina (1860–1917)

Anna Johannson
- Anna Johannson in the Grand pas des étoiles from Petipa's L'ordre du roi
- Born: 1860; Saint Petersburg, Russia
- Died: 1917; Petrograd, Russia

Anna Christianovna Johansson (Russian: Анна Христиановна Иогансон, romanized: Anna Khristianovna Ioganson; 1860–1917) was a Russian ballerina who danced with the Imperial Ballet in Saint Petersburg.

== Life and career ==
Anna Johansson was the daughter of Christian Johansson, the noted Swedish choreographer, teacher and Balletmaster at the Russian Imperial Ballet. She studied ballet with her father and rose to a position as a noted soloist in the Imperial Ballet at the Maryinsky Theatre.

She created many of the most famous soloist roles in the Petipa/Ivanov repertoire. These roles include the following:

- The Fairy Canari and the Diamond Fairy in The Sleeping Beauty (1890)
- The leading soloist of the Waltz of the Flowers in The Nutcracker (1892)
- The Fairy Godmother in Cinderella (1893)
- Aurora, the Goddess of the Dawn in The Awakening of Flora (1894)
- The Black Pearl in La Perle (1896)
- The female variation of the Grand Pas Classique Hongrois in Raymonda (1898)

After retiring from the stage, following her father's footsteps, she became a celebrated teacher of the classe de perfectionnement at the Imperial Ballet School until her death in 1917.
