= Zimmermann (publisher) =

German music publisher

Musikverlag Zimmermann is a German music publisher that claims to be the first specialized publisher for instrumental methods. Until 1933, it was also a manufacturer of brass, string, wind musical instruments as well as mechanical musical instruments. Formed in 1876 in Saint Petersburg it also published Russian composers, including works by Nicolai Medtner, Mily Balakirev, Sergei Lyapunov, Alexander Taneyev, Alexander Gretchaninov and foreign musicians such as Leonardo De Lorenzo and Riccardo Drigo. With subsidiaries in Moscow, Riga, Leipzig and London, the company was one of the largest music dealers in Europe.

The company joined with Robert Lienau Musikverlag in 1991.

== History ==
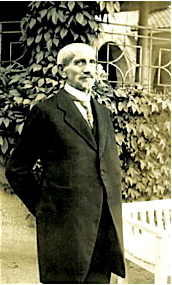
Julius Heinrich Zimmermann

The Zimmermann family was of German origin. Musikverlag Zimmermann traces its roots back to a shop for German musical instruments near the Nevsky Prospekt established by Julius Heinrich Zimmermann (1851-1923) in 1876. In 1880 he set up a factory for brass instruments. Soon he began publishing methods for all instruments, the first official publication was a Method for Flute by Ernesto Köhler in 1885. Julius Heinrich Zimmermann also developed new designs for flutes and was one of the first German saxophone manufacturers. The company also commenced production of string instruments. After settlement of a branch in Moscow in 1882, Zimmermann opened new branches in Leipzig in 1886, in London in 1897 and in Riga in 1905. From 1891 on, the firm produced also mechanical musical instruments. Further, the company was prominent for its balalaikas, developed by Vasily Vasilievich Andreyev. In 1901, Julius Heinrich Zimmermann was bestowed with the Order of Saint Stanislaus by tsar Nicholas II of Russia, beginning an association with the Russian star, as well as becoming exclusive purveyor of brass instruments to the Russian army. At that time he signed on Riccardo Drigo and published his most famous ballets. By 1904, Zimmermann acquired the piano factory of Gustav Fiedler in Leipzig. It produced then Jul. Heinr. Zimmermann pianos, harmoniums and mechanical musical instruments as well as musical boxes and speaking machines.

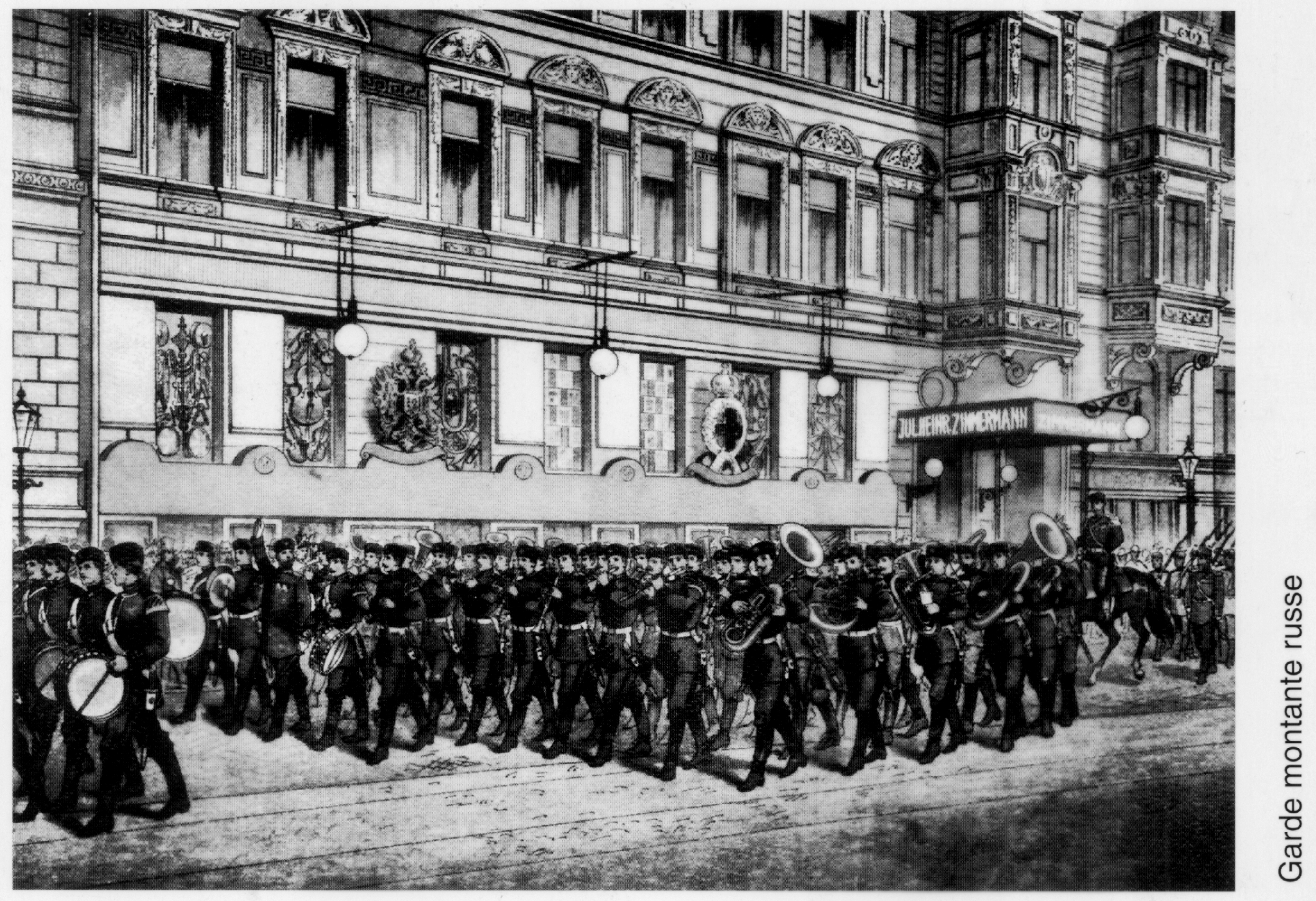
Second Russian Horse Guards before the Zimmermann company in St. Petersburg about 1900.

From 1905 until 1919, Julius Heinrich Zimmermann was deputy of the German Reichstag and opened a distribution of his company in Berlin. The Russian branches of Zimmermann were nationalised by the Bolsheviks in 1918. August Zimmermann (1877-1952), son of the founder and general manager in the Saint Petersburg branch, left the country. His younger brother Wilhelm Zimmermann (1891-1946) was imprisoned and fled for his life to Germany some years later. In the years 1923-1933, Zimmermann published jazz music by German composers and the first German book about this genre. Additionally, the company began offering light music for orchestra. The publishing company was separated from the instruments factories in 1928. August Zimmermann led the instrument sector until the insolvency 1933. Wilhelm Zimmermann became sole owner of the publishing company. Being of part-Jewish ancestry, he was officially prohibited from operating his business from 1933, but still managed his company during the whole Nazi regime. After his death, his widow Edith Zimmermann (1900-1975) did not receive a license from the Soviet military authority to continue publishing and the firm was formally confiscated by the East German authorities. She reached the west, and established the company in Frankfurt. She extended the catalogue with new, young composers and educational publications. When she died in 1975, she had rebuilt a world-renowned venture. Her daughter Maja-Maria Reis (1929-2000) became managing director. Due to her foresight, the company joined with Robert Lienau in 1991. Today the Zimmermann catalogue presents about 3,000 books, including copyrights by Keiko Abe, Siegfried Behrend, Cesar Bresgen, Siegfried Fink, Kurt Hessenberg, Paul Juon and Graham Waterhouse, among others.
