= Pavel Gerdt =

Russian ballet dancer (1844–1917)

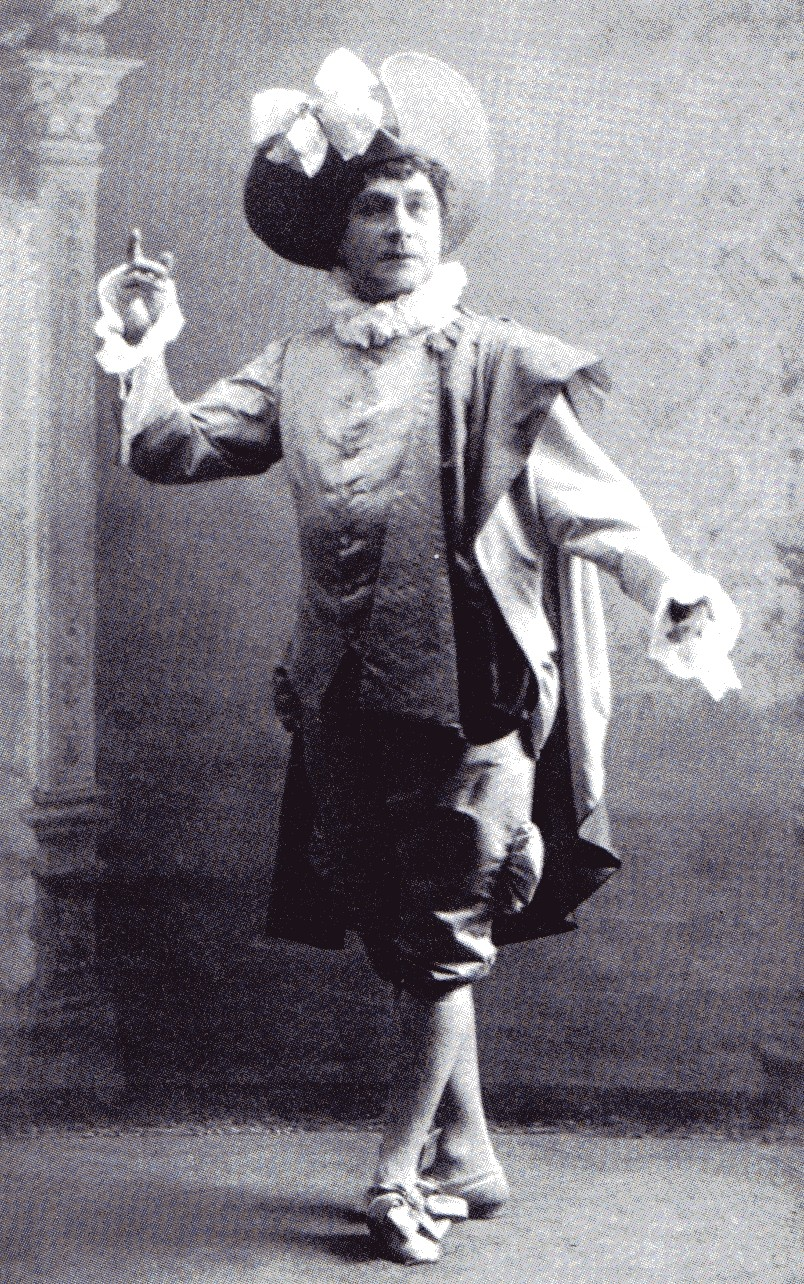
Pavel Gerdt as Damis in the Glazunov/Petipa Les Ruses d'Amour (AKA The Trial of Damis or The Lady Soubrette), Saint Petersburg, 1900

Pavel Andreyevich Gerdt (Russian: Па́вел Андре́евич Ге́рдт), also known as Paul Gerdt (22 November 1844, near Saint Petersburg, Russia – 12 August 1917, in Vamaloki, Finland, Russian Republic), was the Premier Danseur Noble of the Imperial Ballet, the Bolshoi Kamenny Theatre, and the Mariinsky Theatre for 56 years, making his debut in 1860, and retiring in 1916. His daughter Elizaveta Gerdt was also a prominent ballerina and teacher.

Gerdt studied under Christian Johansson, Alexander Pimenov (a pupil of the legendary Charles Didelot), and with Jean-Antoine Petipa (Marius Petipa's father, a master of the old pantomime and a student of Auguste Vestris). He was known as the "Blue Cavalier" of the Saint Petersburg stage, creating the roles of nearly every lead male character throughout the latter half of the 19th century, among them Prince Désiré in The Sleeping Beauty and Prince Coqueluche in The Nutcracker. Nobody in the theatre knew his real age, and when asked, he would always say that he was 23.

Among his pupils at the Imperial Ballet School were Michel Fokine, Vaslav Nijinsky, Tamara Karsavina, George Balanchine, and Anna Pavlova, to whom he taught the soaring leap of Marie Taglioni and Carlotta Grisi.

== See also ==
- List of dancers
