= Pierre Frédéric Malevergne =

Pierre-Frederic Malevergne (or Malavergne or Malovergne; 1810, France – 1872, Russian Empire) was a French dancer who worked in Russia. All English-speaking and French-speaking sources call him Malevergne; all Russian-speaking sources call him Malavergne (Russian: Малавернь) or Malovergne (Russian: Маловернь), Russian: Пьер Фредерик Малавернь/Маловернь.

== Biography ==
His birth name is unknown, he himself preferred to be called by alias Monsieur Frédéric or Frédéric (ru: Фредерик). Of his youth nothing is known. He received an invitation from the Russian Imperial troupe and arrived to Saint Petersburg in 1831.

Monsieur Frédéric became a solo performer of many parties in ballets by such choreographers as Charles Didelot and Marius Petipa, among others. He became a choreographer himself; his greatest work was Paquita together with Marius Petipa in 1847, Saint Petersburg (Bolshoi Kamenny Theatre) and 1848, Moscow (Bolshoi Theatre) with Yelena Andreyanova in the main party. Another his well-known works is Le Corsaire (1858).

Monsieur Frédéric became a dance teacher. He taught for many years. His students included Lev Ivanov and Timofei Stukolkin. In Russia, there were two Imperial troupes: in Saint Petersburg and in Moscow, he worked in both, and eventually he was transferred to Moscow. He died in 1872. Some sources attribute his death place to Moscow while other sources claim he died in Saint Petersburg.

An historian of Russian ballet Alexander Pleshcheyev wrote (Our ballet: 1673-1899): The art of Choreography suffered a great loss in the face of the deceased in Moscow as a dance teacher in the school, old man Frederick Malovergne (ru: «Хореографическое искусство понесло большую потерю в лице скончавшегося в Москве учителя танцев в школе, старика Фредерика Маловерн»).
