= Vasily Samoylov =

Russian opera singer

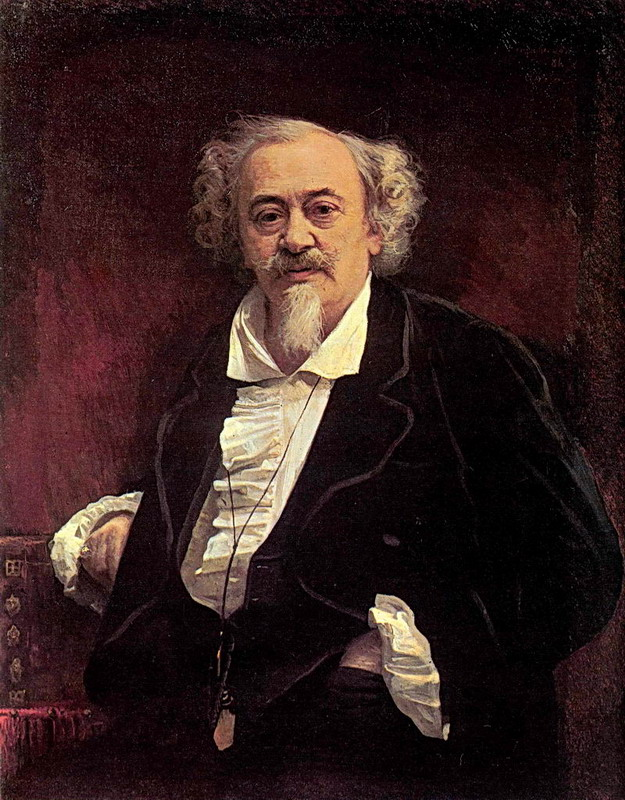
- 1881 portrait by Ivan Kramskoy
- Born: Василий Васильевич Самойлов; 25 January 1813; Saint Petersburg, Russian Empire
- Died: 8 April 1887 (aged 74); Saint Petersburg, Russian Empire
- Occupation: stage actor

Vasily Vasilyevich Samoylov (Russian: Василий Васильевич Самойлов; 25 January 1813 — 8 April 1887) was a Russian stage actor, associated with Alexandrinsky Theatre in Saint Petersburg. Initially an opera singer, he was also an artist whose several albums of paintings include the gallery of stage self-portraits, amounting to a visual autobiography.

== Biography ==
Samoylov was born into an artistic family of the opera singers Vasily Samoylov (1782—1839) and Sofya Chernikova (1787-1854) and was educated first at the Mining Engineering Corps (since 1829) and then the Forestry College (1832). He was about to start a military career when his father suggested that he should make a debut as an opera singer which he did in 1834 in Alexandrinka, taking up the leading part in Étienne Méhul's Joseph.

After three years of opera singing he moved to this theatre's drama troupe and enjoyed his breakthrough in 1839, in the leading part of Makar Alekseyevich Gubkin by Fyodor Koni. Several more creditable performances followed, including Prisypochka (Petersburg Flats, by Fyodor Koni), Almaviva (The Marriage of Figaro by Pierre Beaumarchais), Mitya (The Death of Lyapunov by Stepan Gedeonov), Shvokhnev (The Gamblers by Nikolai Gogol), Chyuzhbinin (Talisman by Grigory Kugushev) The Old Man (Love and Friendship, by Adelaida Taltseva), among others. His best-remembered one was the 1846 performance as Puzyrechkin in Kondraty Efimovich's play The Retired Theatre Musician and the Princess, staged as his benefit.

As the new Russian drama started to producing more and more worthy home-grown material, he continued to excel in the plays by Alexander Ostrovsky, Ivan Turgenev, Alexei Potekhin, Alexey Pisemsky, Alexander Sukhovo-Kobylin, Pyotr Boborykin, Viktor Dyachenko, Nikolai Chayev, Viktor Krylov, Alexander Palm, Dmitry Averkiyev, Vladimir Sollogub. For his last ten years on stage Samoylov was the star of the Imperial Theatre in Saint Petersburg; his benefits included some grand productions like King Lear and Hamlet by William Shakespeare.
