= Lev Ivanov =

Russian ballet dancer and choreographer

- Лев Ива́нович Ива́нов
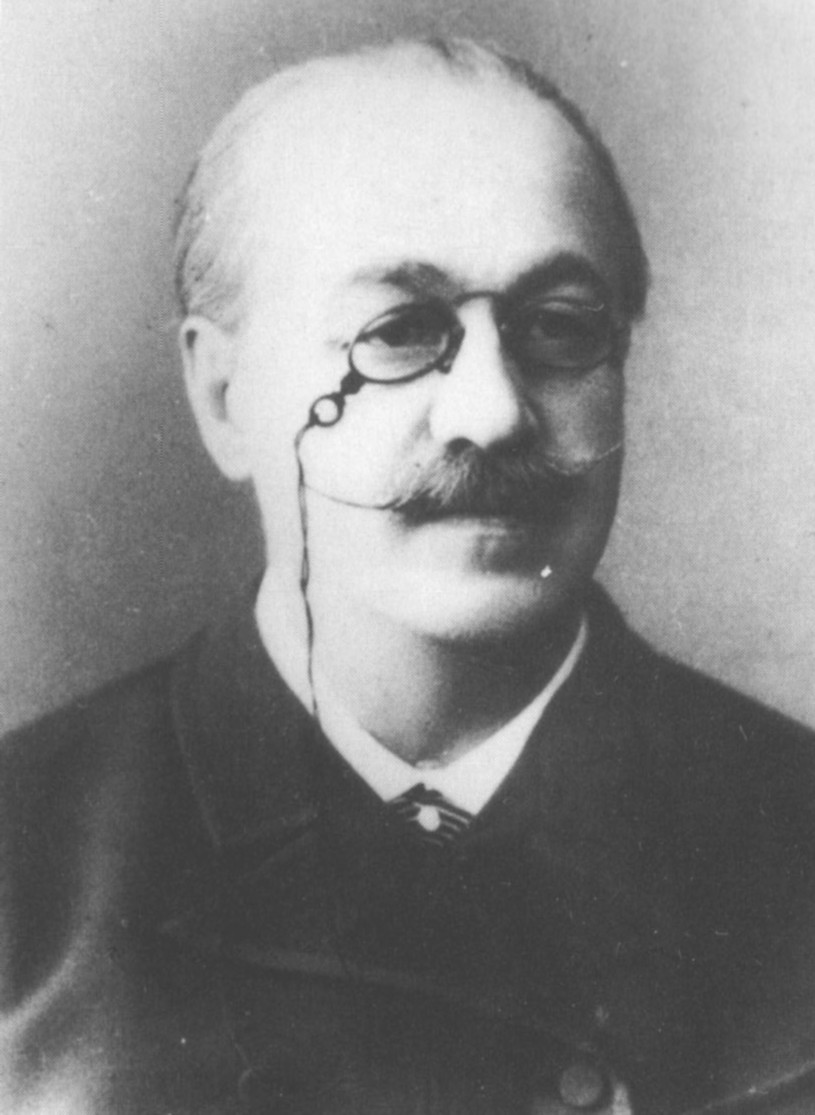
- Lev Ivanov 1885
- Born: Lev Ivanovich Ivanov; 2 March 1834; Moscow, Russian Empire
- Died: 24 December 1901 (aged 67); Saint Petersburg, Russian Empire
- Occupations: Ballet dancer, choreographer, and ballet master
- Years active: 1866 until 1901
- Known for: Ballet master of the Imperial Ballet; Dance of the little swans from Swan Lake; The Nutcracker
- Relatives: Tio Adamova

Lev Ivanovich Ivanov (Russian: Лев Ива́нович Ива́нов; 2 March 1834, Moscow – 24 December 1901, Saint Petersburg) was a Russian ballet dancer and choreographer and later, Second Balletmaster of the Imperial Ballet. As a performer with the Imperial Ballet, he achieved prominence after performing as an understudy in a benefit performance of La Fille Mal Gardée. He is most famous as the choreographer of Acts II and IV of Swan Lake, which include the Dance of the Little Swans, Act II of Cinderella, and The Nutcracker, which he choreographed alongside Marius Petipa.

== Biography ==
Ivanov entered the Moscow School of Dance, but in 1844 moved to Saint Petersburg where he studied at the Imperial Ballet, becoming an official member of the Corps de ballet in 1852. Among his teachers during this time were Jean-Antoine Petipa, Alexandr Pimenov, Pierre Frédéric Malavergne and Emile Gredlu (Эмиль Гредлю).

Historically, Ivanov is credited with choreographing the entirety of premiere of Pyotr Ilyich Tchaikovsky's ballet The Nutcracker in 1892 due to the ill health of the ballet master, Marius Petipa. While some contemporary and modern accounts dispute this, Ivanov is still mentioned in The New Grove Dictionary of Music and Musicians, Second Edition with choreographing at least the majority of the ballet as Petipa had reportedly not progressed very far in his work. Regardless of the amount of work he actually did, Petipa's was the only name listed for choreography on posters for the first production in St. Petersburg.

Ivanov worked with Petipa on a new restaging of Tchaikovsky's Swan Lake ballet in 1895. Ivanov choreographed the entirety of the lakeside acts or "white acts", Act II and Act IV. This includes the Dance of the Little Swans, an iconic pas de quatre where the four cygnets huddle together and dance in unison, before breaking the chain and falling to the floor whilst attempting to fly. Ivanov also choreographed the Danse Vénitienne (Neapolitan/Venetian Dance) and the Pas Hongrois (Hungarian Dance) of the third bier scene.

In his last years Ivanov was in financial straits. On the strength of his 50 years' service he petitioned the Imperial Theatres for financial assistance.

== Ballets ==
=== Original works ===
- La Forêt enchantée (en. The Enchanted Forest). Ballet-fantastique in one act. Music by Riccardo Drigo. Imperial Ballet School, 5 April [O.S. 24 March] 1887. Second premiere, Imperial Mariinsky Theatre, 15 May [O.S. 3 May] 1887. Peterhof, July 1889, performance supervised by Marius Petipa.
- La Tulipe de Haarlem (en. The Tulip of Harlem). Ballet-fantastique in three acts. Music by Baron Boris Fitinhoff-Schell. Imperial Mariinsky Theatre, 16 October [O.S. 4 October] 1887.
  - Revival by Claudia Kulichevskaya and Pavel Gerdt. Imperial Ballet School, 16 April [O.S. 3 April] 1902.
  - Revival by Alexander Shiryaev. Imperial Mariinsky Theatre, 29 April [O.S. 16 April] 1903.
- La Flûte magique (en. The Magic Flute). Ballet-comique in one act. Music by Riccardo Drigo. Imperial Ballet School, 22 March [O.S. 10 March] 1889. Imperial Mariinsky Theatre, 23 April [O.S. 11 April] 1889.
- La Ruse de Cupidon (en. Cupid's Prank). Ballet-anacréontique in one act. Music by Alexander Friedman. Krasnoe Selo, 6 August [O.S. 25 July] 1890. Imperial Mariinsky Theatre, 23 November [O.S. 11 November] 1890.
- La Beauté de Séville (en. The Beauty of Seville). Divertissement-ballet in one act. Music by various composers. Krasnoe Selo, 10 August [O.S. 29 July] 1889.
- La Fête des bateliers (en. The Boatman's Festival). Divertissement-ballet in one act. Music by Alexander Friedman. Krasnoe Selo, 7 August [O.S. 26 July] 1890.
- The Nutcracker. Ballet-féerie in two acts. Choreographed jointly with Marius Petipa. Music by Pyotr Ilyich Tchaikovsky. Imperial Mariinsky Theatre, 18 December [O.S. 6 December] 1892.
- Cinderella (a.k.a. Zolushka). Ballet-féerie in three acts. Staged jointly with Enrico Cecchetti and Marius Petipa. Music by Baron Boris Fitinhoff-Schell. Imperial Mariinsky Theatre, 17 December [O.S. 5 December] 1893.
  - revival by Lev Ivanov. Bolshoi Theatre, Moscow, 12 March [O.S. 28 February] 1898
- Swan Lake. Ballet-fantastique in three acts. Staged jointly with Marius Petipa. Music by Pyotr Illyich Tchaikovsky, revised by Riccardo Drigo. Imperial Mariinsky Theatre, 27 January [O.S. 15 January] 1895.
- Acis et Galatée (en. Acis and Galatea). Ballet-mythologique in one act. Music by Andrei Kadlets. Imperial Mariinsky Theatre, 2 February [O.S. 21 January] 1896.
  - revival by Alexander Shiryaev. Imperial Ballet School, 3 May [O.S. 20 April] 1905.
- La Fille du Mikado (en. The Mikado's Daughter). Ballet-fantastique in three acts. Music by Baron Vasily Wrangell. Imperial Mariinsky Theatre, 21 November [O.S. 9 November] 1897.
- Egyptian Nights (a.k.a. Une Nuit d'Egypte or Nuits égyptiennes). Divertissement-ballet in one act. Music by Anton Arensky. Never premiered.
  - revival by Mikhail Fokine. Imperial Mariinsky Theatre, 8 March [O.S. 24 February] 1908.
  - revival by Mikhail Fokine as Cléopâtre for the Ballets Russes. Théâtre du Châtelet, Paris, 2 June 1909.
- Sylvia. Ballet-mythologique in three acts. Music by Léo Delibes. Staging completed by Pavel Gerdt due to Ivanov's death. Imperial Mariinsky Theatre, 15 December [O.S. 2 December] 1901.
