= Fedor Solntsev =

Russian painter

- Фёдор Солнцев
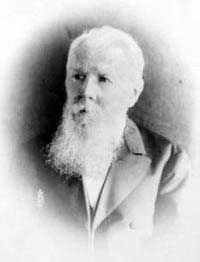
- Fedor Grigorevich Solntsev
- Born: 26 April 1801; Yaroslavl Governorate, Russian Empire
- Died: 15 March 1892 (aged 90); Saint Petersburg, Russian Empire
- Resting place: Volkovo Cemetery, Saint Petersburg
- Education: Stepan Shchukin; Alexander Varnek
- Alma mater: Imperial Academy of Arts (1824)
- Known for: Painting
- Awards: Big Gold Medal of the Imperial Academy of Arts (1827)
- Elected: Member Academy of Arts (1836); Professor by rank (1876)
- Patrons: Alexey Olenin

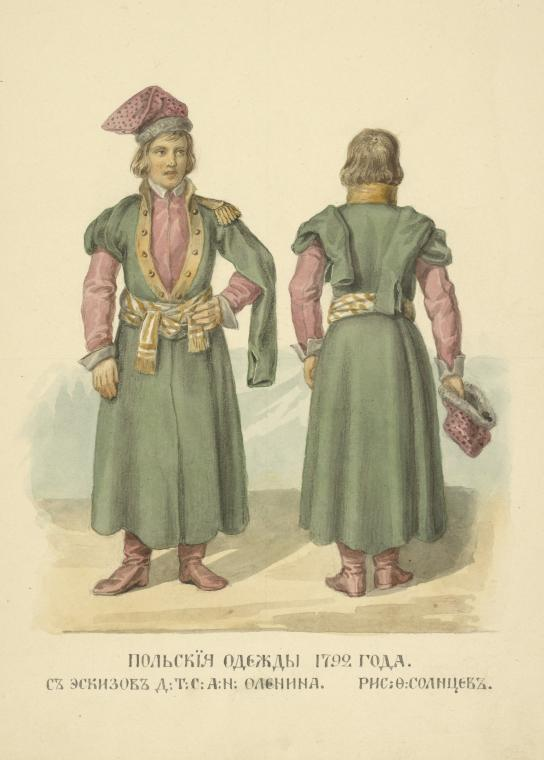
Solntsev drawing of a traditional Polish dress.

Fedor or Fyodor Grigoryevich Solntsev (Russian: Фёдор Григо́рьевич Со́лнцев; 26 April [O.S. 14 April] 1801 – 15 March [O.S. 3 March] 1892) was a Russian painter and historian of art. His artwork was a major contribution in recording and preserving medieval Russian culture, which was a common subject of his paintings. He was the main author of the fundamental work Antiquities of the Russian State, the main decorator of interiors of the Grand Kremlin Palace in Moscow. He discovered and restored mosaics and frescoes of Saint Sophia Cathedral and Cathedral of the Dormition of the Monastery of the Caves in Kiev, and of Cathedral of Saint Demetrius in Vladimir.

Fedor Solntsev, together with Metropolitan Philaret and Archimandrite Photius are considered the founders of modern Russian icon painting canon synthesizing ancient Russian traditions, post-Petrine efforts and modern art discoveries.

== Biography ==
Fedor Solntsev was born in Verkhne-Nikulskoye a village near Rybinsk in the Yaroslavl Governorate. His parents were serfs of Count Ivan Alekseyevich Musin-Pushkin. His father, Grigory Konstantinovich Solntsev, worked as a box-office attendant for the Imperial theaters in Saint Petersburg and travelled to the village very infrequently while his mother, Elizaveta Frolovna Solntseva, was a peasant and lived all her life in the village. Fedor spent his early life with his mother and siblings. After discovering his artistic ability, his master freed the Solntsev family, which allowed Fedor to enter the Imperial Academy of Arts in Saint Petersburg in 1815 and became a pupil of Alexei Yegorov and Stepan Shchukin. Later, Fedor's younger brother, Yegor Solntsev also graduated from the Imperial Academy of Art and became a notable painter.

Fedor graduated from the Academy in 1824 receiving a "Lesser Gold Medal" for his painting A Peasant Family. In 1827 he received the "Greater Gold Medal" from the Academy for his painting Render unto Caesar. In 1836 he became a member of the Imperial Academy of Arts for his work Meeting of Grand Duke Sviatoslav with John of Tzimiskes. In 1876 Solntsev was appointed Professor of the Academy.

Fedor Solntsev's work was supported by the President of Imperial Academy of Arts Alexey Olenin and Emperor Nicholas I. The Emperor commissioned Solntsev to decorate dinner parties and embellish his private apartments in the Kremlin. Through his life Solntsev worked on restoration of many Moscow Kremlin buildings including the Grand Kremlin Palace and Kremlin Armoury. He painted Cathedral of Christ the Saviour and other churches in Moscow. Solntsev also worked in Kiev with restoration and describing artefacts of Kiev Pechersk Lavra. He painted the interiors of the Krestovozdvizhenskaya Church there.

Olenin commissioned Solntsev to describe archaeological and historical artifacts of Russian state. Solntsev started to work in 1830. He made more than 3000 highly detailed drawing of different artifacts including the record of all the Kremlin's riches. Seven hundreds of those drawings made the core for the six-volume publications titled Antiquities of the Russian State. The encyclopedia was published after Olenin's death using the funds provided by Nicholas I. Solntsev also provided a detailed chronicle of Old Russian style in his book Clothing of Russia.

Solntsev died in St. Petersburg on 3 March 1892, aged 90; he's interred into the Volkovo Cemetery, south of the Literatorskie Mostki.
