= Cinderella (Fitinhof-Schell) =

Ballet-féerie in three acts

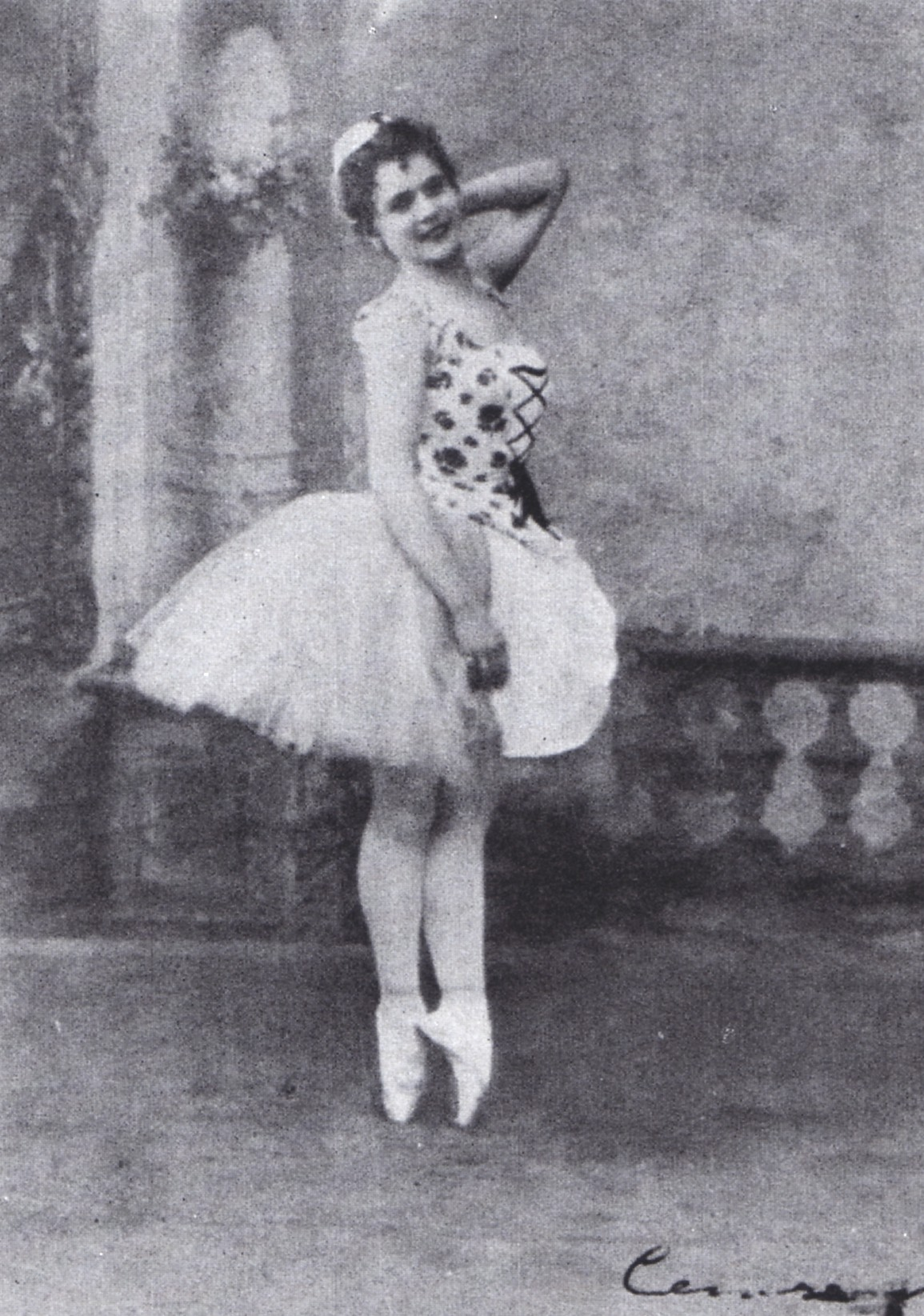
- The Italian ballerina Pierina Legnani in her costume for act I of the Imperial Ballet's production of Cinderella. St. Petersburg, 1893.
- Choreographer: Enrico Cecchetti (Acts I and III); Lev Ivanov (Act II); Supervised by Marius Petipa
- Music: Baron Boris Fitinhoff-Schell
- Libretto: Countess Lidiya Pashkova and Ivan Vsevolozhsky
- Premiere: 17 December [O.S. 5 December] 1893; Imperial Mariinsky Theatre, St. Petersburg, Russia
- Design: Heinrich Legovt (act I); Matvey Shishkov (act II); Mikhail Bocharov (act III)
- Genre: Ballet-féerie

Cinderella (ru. «Золушка», Zolushka) (fr. Cendrillon) is a ballet-féerie in three acts, with the choreography of Enrico Cecchetti (Acts I and III) and Lev Ivanov (Act II) supervised by Marius Petipa. Music is by Baron Boris Fitinhoff-Schell; the libretto is by Lidia Pashkova (ru: Лидия Александровна Пашкова) and Ivan Vsevolozhsky. It was first presented by the Imperial Ballet on 17 December [O.S. 5 December] 1893 at the Imperial Mariinsky Theatre in St. Petersburg, Russian Empire.

== Roles and original cast ==
Role	St Petersburg 1893
Cinderella	Pierina Legnani
Prince Charming	Pavel Gerdt
The Fairy Godmother/Good Fairy	Anna Johansson
Cavalier Pignarole, Cinderella's father	Timofei Stukolkin
Henrietta, the Stepmother	Giuseppina Cecchetti
Aloise, the Stepsister	Maria Anderson
Odette, the Stepsister	Mathilde Kschessinskaya
The King	Nikolai Aistov
The Queen	Alexandra Ogoleit
Chamberlain	Alexei Bulgakov
Grand Pas soloist	Claudia Kulichevskaya
The Master of Ceremonies	Ivan Voronkov

== History ==
The libretto of Cinderella was criticized for putting more emphasis on spectacle than on drama and story-telling. Nevertheless, the production was an enormous success due to the ovation given to the Italian ballerina Pierina Legnani in the title role. On opening night she caused a sensation in the Mariinsky Theatre, and was universally praised by the St. Petersburg critics, with a critic of the Peterbugskaya gazeta reporting that her dancing reached a level of "...unprecedented perfection." The theatre critic for the Peterburgskii lpistok reported that Legnani executed "...the most dizzying difficulties of ballet technique with absolute ease, without the least tension or fatigue...", and that she "...revealed such perfection of technique and such strength as are difficult to imagine." He went on to state that Legnani "...must unquestionably be counted among the greatest virtuosas of choreography which Petersburg had ever seen."

The most celebrated scene of Cinderella was the ball in the throne room of the castle in the second act, which included an elaborate Grand Pas d'action for the characters Cinderella, the Prince, soloists and the corps de ballet. Also successful was the spectacular Night tableaux of Act III, representing the Nile, Granada and Paris with each number beginning by the dancers and scenery rising out of a lake at the back of the stage with the wave of the Good Fairy's wand.

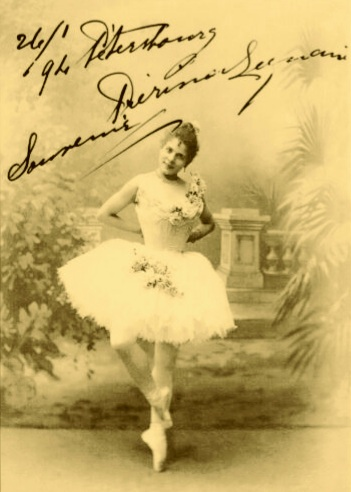
Pierina Legnani in the title role of Cinderella. St. Petersburg, 1894

The premiere of Cinderella has the distinction of being the first performance of a ballet in Russia to feature a ballerina performing 32 consecutive fouettés en tournant, which was executed by Pierina Legnani in the title role. The ballet historian Konstantin Skalkovsky, who served as dance critic for the Peterburgskaya gazeta at the turn of the 20th century, reported on Legnani's feat: "...in the last act Legnani positively outdid herself. When Emma Bessone danced the lead in "The Haarlem Tulip" she did 14 fouettés. In her variation Legnani performed 32 of them without stopping, and without traveling one inch! The public delightedly applauded the Ballerina and compelled her to repeat this variation as well. On the repetition she nevertheless did 28 fouettés. To count them became the favorite occupation of the public."

Cinderella was later staged for the Bolshoi Theatre of Moscow by Lev Ivanov, with the first performance given on 31 July [O.S. 19 July] 1898. Ivanov supervised a revival of the second act for the farewell benefit performance of Pierina Legnani on 5 February [O.S. 23 January] 1901. This would prove to be the last performance of any part of the ballet.

Fitinhof-Schell's score for Cinderella was never published in any form. The only part of the score that is still heard is the female variation in polka rhythm danced in the Mariinsky Theatre's version of the so-called "Le Corsaire Pas de Deux".

== Résumé of scenes and dances ==
Taken from the original printed libretto of 1893.

Act I

- № 01 Jeu dansant des marmitons
- № 02 Scène dansante
- № 03 Scène mimique de Cendrillon
- № 04 Pas des étincelles
- № 05 Apparition de la fée bienfaisante
- № 06 Leçon de maintien
- № 07 Cortège et départ de Cendrillon pour le bal

Act II

- № 08 L'arrivée des invités
- № 09 Entrée du roi et de la reine
- № 10 Réception des ambassadeurs
- № 11 Apparition de Cendrillon
- № 12 Danse russe
- № 13 Danse polonaise
- № 14 Grand pas d'action
- № 15 Fuite de Cendrillon

Act III

- № 16 Scène mimique de Cendrillon et la fée bienfaisante
- № 17 Marche et entrée des invités
- № 18 Apparition de Cendrillon, la fée bienfaisante et les princesses de la nuit
- № 19 Pas de princesses de la nuit et de la fée du soleil
- № 20 La nuit du Nil
- № 21 La nuit de Grenade
- № 22 La nuite Parisienne
- № 23 Danse des quatres éléments–Terre, eau, air et feu
- № 24 Grand pas
- № 25 Apothéose

== Synopsis ==
ACT I – A large kitchen

Scene 1

At the rise of the curtain, Gianna the cook and her scullery maids are busy preparing dinner, but Gianna no sooner leaves the kitchen than the scullery maids abandon their duties and begin to dance and play with saucepans and skillets. Gianna returns, sees their mischief and sternly orders them back to business; they pay her no heed and Gianna, drawn into their merriment, begins to dance with them. A bell is heard. Gianna now emphatically orders her helpers to calm down; in confusion, they rush back to their places.

Scene 2

Aloisa and Odette enter hurriedly, hunting for their little sister to help them dress for the ball. Seeing that Cinderella is not there, they order the scullery maids to find her at once. The sisters are in a frightful worry. The hour of their departure for the royal celebration is approaching and their toilettes are not yet finished; they begin to smarten themselves up, angry and astonished at Cinderella's absence.

Scene 3

Cinderella runs in holding a sheaf of straw; her sisters rush over to push and pinch her and make their poor sister suffer, then they order her to set right their toilettes, which Cinderella willingly tries to do. The sisters, now content, begin to dream and boast to one another of their successes at the ball. Making fun of Cinderella, they dance and force her to dance as well. Their parents enter and press their daughters to get ready to leave. In vain, Cinderella begs her parents and sisters to take her along. Her sisters laugh and her father orders her sternly to stay at home and tend to her chores.

Scene 4

Alone and sad, Cinderella dreams about the pleasures of the ball, imagining the dances, but realising that she cannot go, and hurries about her work. The hearth flares up; Cinderella watches astonished as living sparks fly out of the fireplace. They surround her; delighted, she admires them and dances with them.

Scene 5

The Good Fairy appears; Cinderella's godmother and protector. Amazed by the good will and patience with which Cinderella bears her undeserved debasement, she promises to grant her any wish. Cinderella asks to go to the royal ball. With pleasure the Fairy agrees, but on the condition that she stay no later than midnight: with the last stroke of twelve o'clock, all the luxuries granted her will disappear. Cinderella happily thanks the Good Fairy, at a wave of whose hand a brilliant cortège appears. Servant-fairies assist Cinderella in completing her toilette for the ball and putting on magnificent slippers. The Fairy, when Cinderella is properly dressed, gives her a lesson in deportment and hurries her off, reminding her of the condition she set.

ACT II – The Throne Room of the Castle

Scene 1

Courtiers have gathered to greet the King, and promenade in expectation of his arrival; a few make lively conversation about the celebration. The Master of Ceremonies announces the royal family; the courtiers hurry to their places.

Scene 2

The royal couple enters and take their places, Prince Charming standing next to them. The guests, including the Pignarole family, pay their profound respects to the Queen and King. The King, enraptured by the prettiness of Cavalier Pignarole's daughters, invites them to take a place next to the throne.

Scene 3

Just then the herald's trumpets sound, announcing guests from Moscow and Poland, who, charmed by their welcome, pay their respects to the King and take their places. The Chamberlain rushes in and announces the arrival of an unknown princess, accompanied by a brilliant retinue. General excitement; the Prince hastens to meet the stranger.

Scene 4

Cinderella enters; Prince Charming, respectfully offering his arm, presents her to the King, Queen and court. The onlookers are struck by the unknown princess's beauty and brilliant toilette. The Pignaroles are amazed at the stranger's striking likeness to their youngest daughter, who was left at home. The Prince lavishes his attentions on the newly arrived princess and the King and Queen invite her to take a place next to them; this causes Aloisa and Odette to bear her malice and to envy the unknown guest. The Prince orders the Master of Ceremonies to begin the ball; the Prince takes part, dancing only with the Princess, delighted by her beauty. Odette and Aloisa also take part in the dances and try to attract the Prince's attention, but he is charmed by Cinderella's beauty.

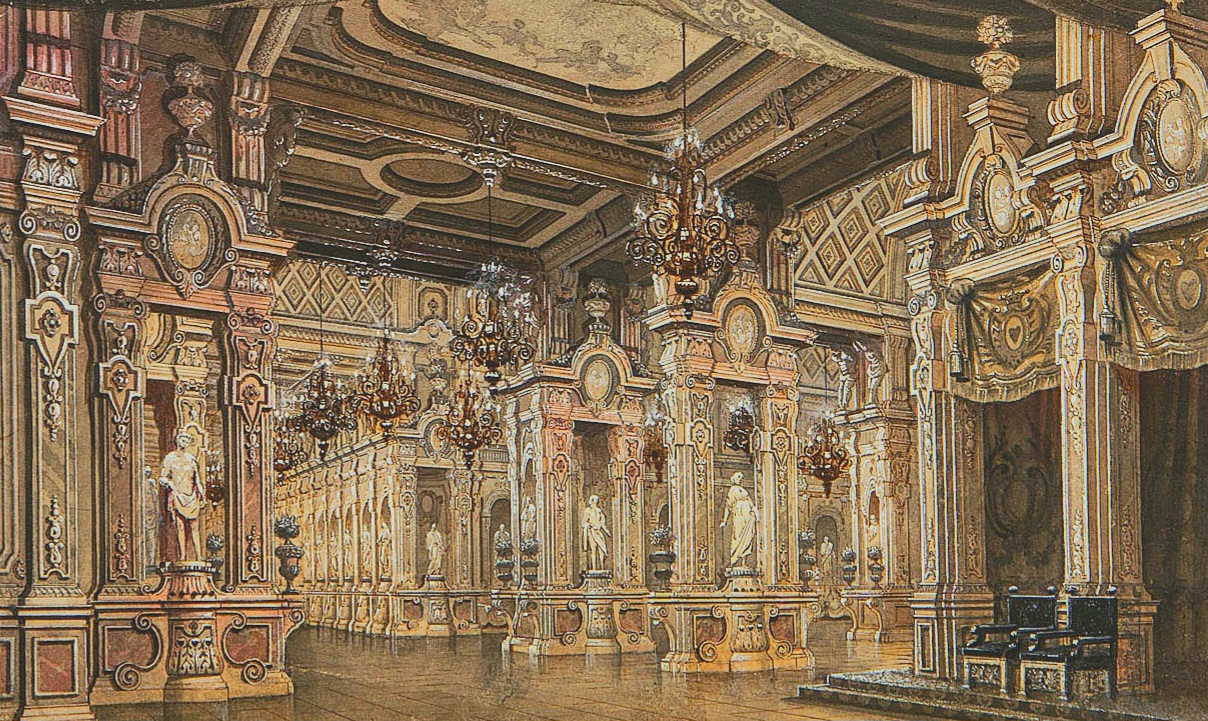
Design by Matvey Shishkov for act II of the Imperial Ballet's production of Cinderella, St. Petersburg, 1893

Scene 5

The clock begins to strike midnight. Cinderella, enchanted by the Prince's attentions, completely forgets the Good Fairy's condition. With the last stroke of twelve, she suddenly remembers and quickly retires at the moment her mother walks up to the Prince and engages him in conversation. Cinderella, whose rich attire has turned simple, tries to leave the royal palace unnoticed. The Prince, observing the beautiful stranger's disappearance, orders his chamberlain to follow her, but just then, a page enters and gives the Prince the slipper which the Princess lost. The Prince, admiring the slipper, orders it to be announced throughout the land that he will choose for his bride the woman whose foot the slipper fits.

ACT III – A Fantastic Garden in the Prince's Castle

Scene 1

Servants and pages, preparing for the Prince's celebration, walk through the garden from time to time. The Prince enters with his retinue, wanting to know if his wishes have been met and if the beautiful stranger has turned up. The chamberlain calms the Prince, adding that the Princess is probably there. Contended with the chamberlain's assurances, the Prince invites the King and Queen into the ball.

Scene 2

On the day after the ball, Cinderella, wishing to see the Prince again and to look for her lost slipper, comes to the royal garden. Hearing footsteps, she hides in the bushes, frightened, falls to her knees in despair and prays for her godmother to help her.

Scene 3

The Good Fairy appears, and wishing to help her favourite again, still reproaches her for disobeying and not coming home in time. Cinderella begs the Good Fairy's forgiveness and asks her to help. Trumpets sound; the herald announces that Prince Charming will choose as his bride the woman whose foot fits the slipper which was found. Cinderella wants to be at the celebration to see him again and begs the Fairy to let her go to the ball. The Fairy gladly agrees; they withdraw.

Scene 4

The King and Queen enter with the Prince and the others invited to the celebration. The Prince asks the assembled beauties to try on the slipper, but their efforts are in vain; the slipper does not fit any of them. The herald now announces the Good Fairy with Cinderella. The Prince suggests that Cinderella also try the slipper and, to the astonishment of all, the slipper fits and stays on her foot. The onlookers are struck by Cinderella's beauty and the Prince, delighted, declares his love to her; her sisters beg forgiveness for treating her badly. She forgives them and the heralds announce Cinderella as the Prince's bride. The entire court congratulates them.
