= Sofia Samoilova =

Russian opera singer

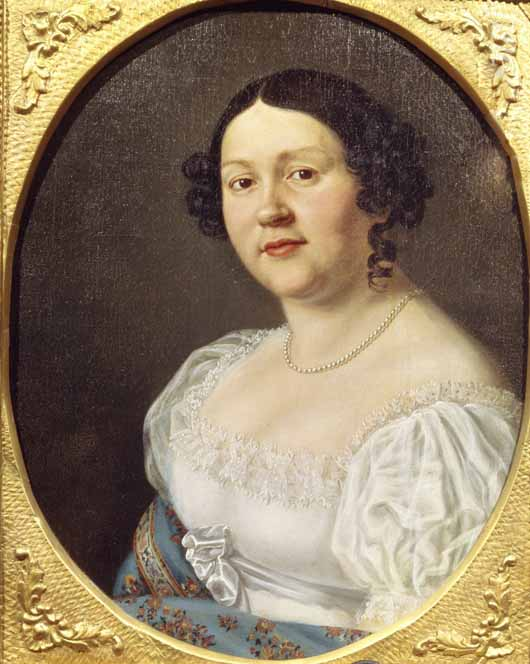
- Born: 1786 or 1787
- Died: March 3, 1854; St. Petersburg, Russian Empire
- Occupations: Opera singer, Actress
- Years active: 1798 — 1843
- Organization(s): Bolshoi Kamenny Theater, St. Petersburg

Sofia Samoilova (1787 – 1854), was a Russian stage actress and opera singer (soprano).

She was engaged at the Bolshoi Theatre, Saint Petersburg in 1804–1843, during which she had a successful career and was regarded to belong to the elite of its members. She performed within opera, vaudeville as well as drama.

She was the daughter of the actor Vasily Chernikov and actress Praskovya Chernikova, married the actor Vasily Samoilov, and became the mother of Vasily Samoylov, Nadezhda Samoilova and Vera Samoilova-Michurina.
