= Viktor Dyachenko =

Russian playwright and theatre critic

- Born: Viktor Ivanovich Dyachenko; 1818; Moscow, Russian Empire
- Died: 1876 (aged 57–58); Voronezh, Russian Empire
- Occupation: playwright
- Years active: 1844—1876

Viktor Antonovich Dyachenko (Russian: Виктор Антонович Дьяченко, born 1818, — died 1876) was a Russian playwright and theatre critic.

Having debuted in 1830 with God Gives You a Prayer... (За Богом молитва, за Царем служба не пропадает), he authored, in all, 76 plays, the most successful of which was Victim for Victim (Жертва за жертву), God's Punishment (Кара Божия, both 1861) and The Governor (Гувернёр, 1864). At the peak of his success, in 1860—1863, he wrote 23 plays, 21 of which were included into the five-volume Drama Works collection which came out in Moscow in 1873—1876. Dealing predominantly with family life, Dyachenko's plays were highly popular with the general public as well as the actors who admired their structural perfection and simple, expressive language. Vasily Samoylov, Elena Struyskaya and Glikeriya Fedotova, among others, have expressed their delight with the way Dyachenko's plays had given big push to their respective careers.
