= Paquita =

Choreographed ballet by Joseph Mazilier

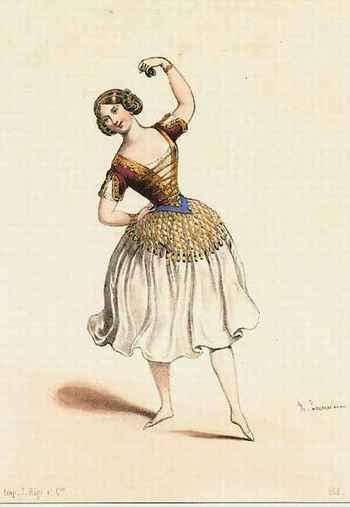
Carlotta Grisi as Paquita

Paquita is a ballet in two acts and three scenes originally choreographed by Joseph Mazilier to music by Édouard Deldevez and Ludwig Minkus. Paul Foucher received royalties as librettist.

== History ==
Paquita is the creation of French composer Édouard Deldevez and Paris Opéra Ballet Master Joseph Mazilier. It was first presented at the Salle Le Peletier by the Paris Opera Ballet on 1 April 1846 and was retained in the repertory of the Opéra until 1851.

In 1847, Paquita was staged for the first time in Russia for the Imperial Ballet of St. Petersburg by Marius Petipa and Pierre-Frédéric Malavergne, being the first work ever staged by Petipa in Russia. In 1881, Petipa produced a revival of the ballet for which he added new pieces specially composed by Ludwig Minkus. This included the Paquita pas de trois for the first act and the Paquita grand pas classique and the Mazurka des enfants for the last act. Petipa's version of Paquita was retained in the repertory of the Mariinsky Theatre until 1926.

Petipa's 1881 additions for Paquita survived long after the full-length ballet left the stage. Today these pieces, particularly the Grand pas classique, are major cornerstones of the traditional classical ballet repertory and have been staged by ballet companies throughout the world.

Petipa's choreography for the Imperial Ballet's production of Paquita was notated in the Stepanov method of choreographic notation around 1902. The notations were made while Petipa himself taught and rehearsed the great Anna Pavlova for her début in the title rôle. Today, this notation is part of the Sergeyev Collection, a cache of notations and other materials that document many of the works in the Imperial Ballet's repertory during the twilight of the Russian Empire.

In 2001, director Brigitte Lefèvre asked French choreographer Pierre Lacotte to produce a revival of the full-length two act Paquita for the Paris Opera Ballet. Although Lacotte re-choreographed all of the ballet himself, he restored Joseph Mazilier's original mime sequences and mise-en-scène, as well as Petipa's 1881 additions. Paquita was performed again by the Paris Opera in 2007.

In 2014, the Stepanov notation expert Doug Fullington and Russian choreographer Alexei Ratmansky mounted a reconstruction of Petipa's final revival of Paquita for the Bayerisches Staatsballett.

== Roles and original cast ==
Role	Paris, 1846	St. Petersburg, 1847	St. Petersburg, 1881
Paquita	Carlotta Grisi	Yelena Andreyanova	Ekaterina Vazem
Lucien d'Hervilly	Lucien Petipa	Marius Petipa	Pavel Gerdt

== Plot ==
The story takes place in Spain during the presence of Napoleon's army. The heroine is the young Romani girl, Paquita. Unbeknownst to Paquita, she is really of noble birth, having been abducted by Romani people when she was an infant. She saves the life of a young French officer, Lucien d'Hervilly, who is the target of a Spanish governor who desires to have him killed by Iñigo, a Roma chief. By way of a medallion, she discovers that she is of noble birth, being in fact the cousin of Lucien. As such, she and the Officer are able to get married.

== History of the Paquita grand pas classique ==
Marius Petipa added the Grand pas classique to the third act of Paquita in 1881 for the benefit performance of the Imperial Ballet's Prima ballerina Ekaterina Vazem. The music was composed by Ludwig Minkus, whose original composition featured a Grand adagio with cadenza for solo violin composed for Leopold Auer.

Anna Pavlova included the Grand Pas classique in her company's repertory.

Rudolf Nureyev staged the piece in 1964 for the Royal Academy of Dancing, and at La Scala in 1970. Nureyev also staged it for the Vienna State Opera Ballet and American Ballet Theatre in 1971. For all of his productions of the work Nureyev used John Lanchbery's adaptation of the music. In 1984 Natalia Makarova staged a new version of the Paquita grand pas classique for American Ballet Theatre with music again arranged by Lanchbery. To date the company still retains Makarova's staging in their repertory, and many companies throughout the world have staged her version of the piece.

In 1974 the Ballet Master Nikita Dolgushin produced a staging of the Paquita grand pas classique for the Maly Theatre Ballet of St. Petersburg. For his production Dolgushin called upon the former ballerina Elizaveta Gerdt—who performed in Marius Petipa's original version of the piece— to assist in restoring the Paquita grand pas classique to its form as performed during the early 20th century.

In 1978 the Kirov/Mariinsky Ballet's newly appointed artistic director Oleg Vinogradov staged a new version of the Paquita grand pas classique for the company, a staging largely based on the version Pyotr Gusev staged for the Maly Theatre Ballet in 1952. The Kirov/Mariinsky Ballet still retain Vinogradov's version in their repertory, and many companies throughout the world include his version of the piece in their repertories.

== Gallery of historical images ==
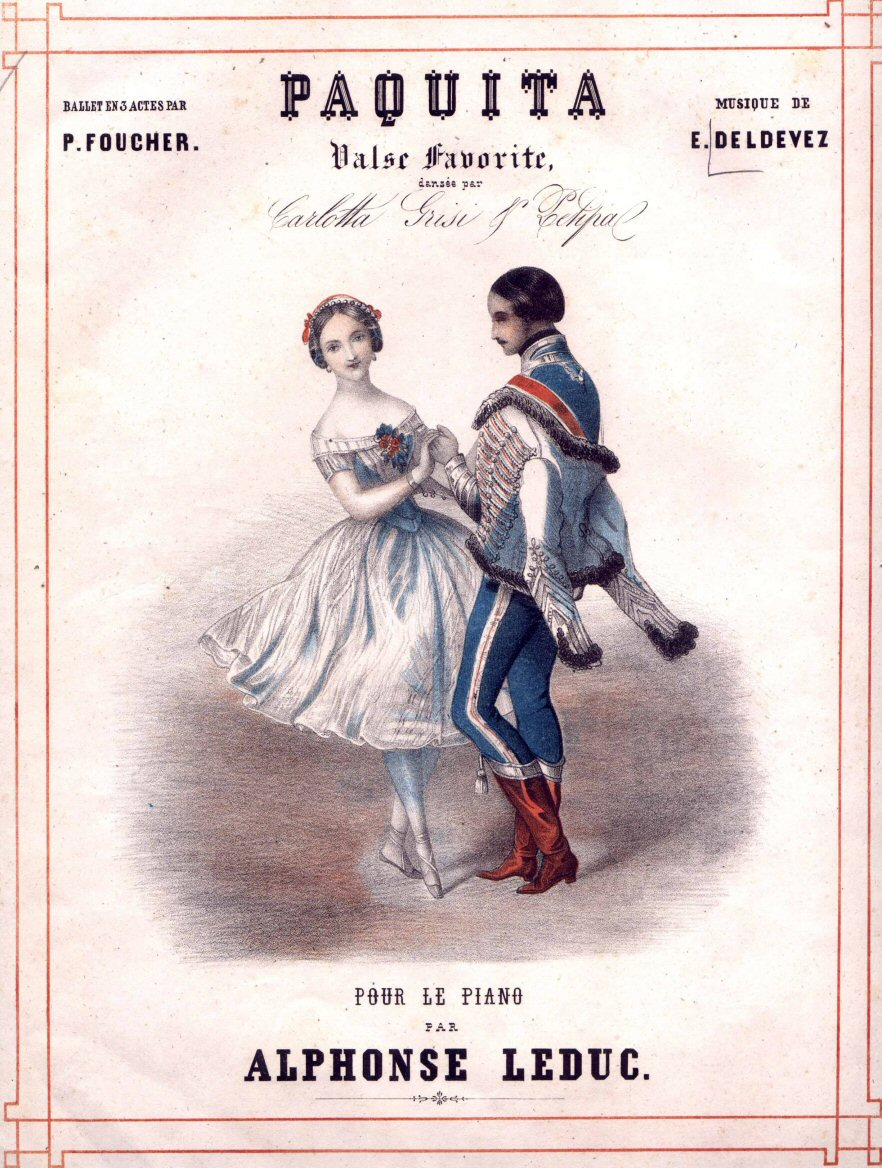
Published piano reduction of the Valse favorite from Deldevez's original score. London, 1847

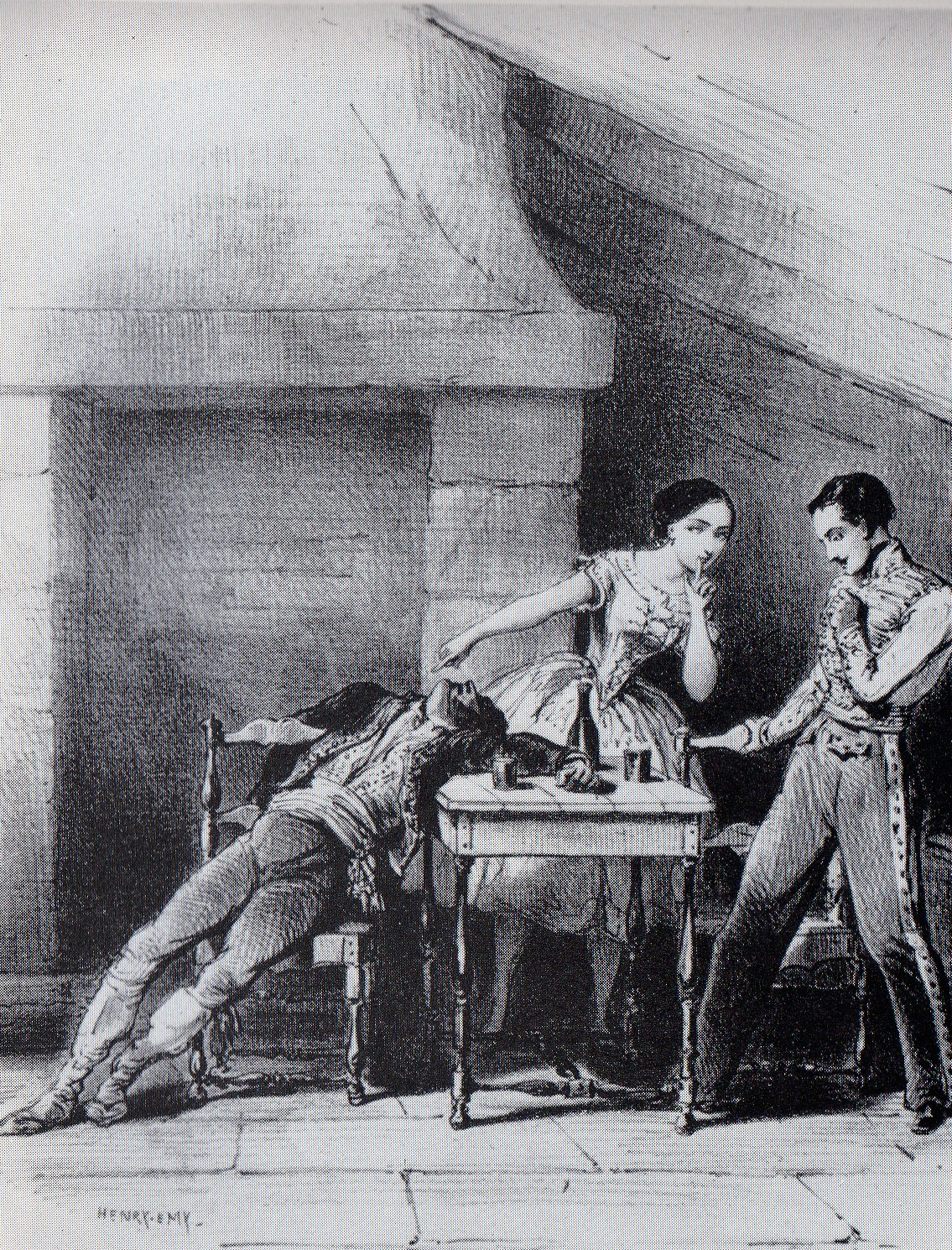
(left to right) Georges Ellie as Iñigo, Carlotta Grisi as Paquita, and Lucien Petipa as Lucien d'Hervilly in Act I-Scene 2. Paris, 1844

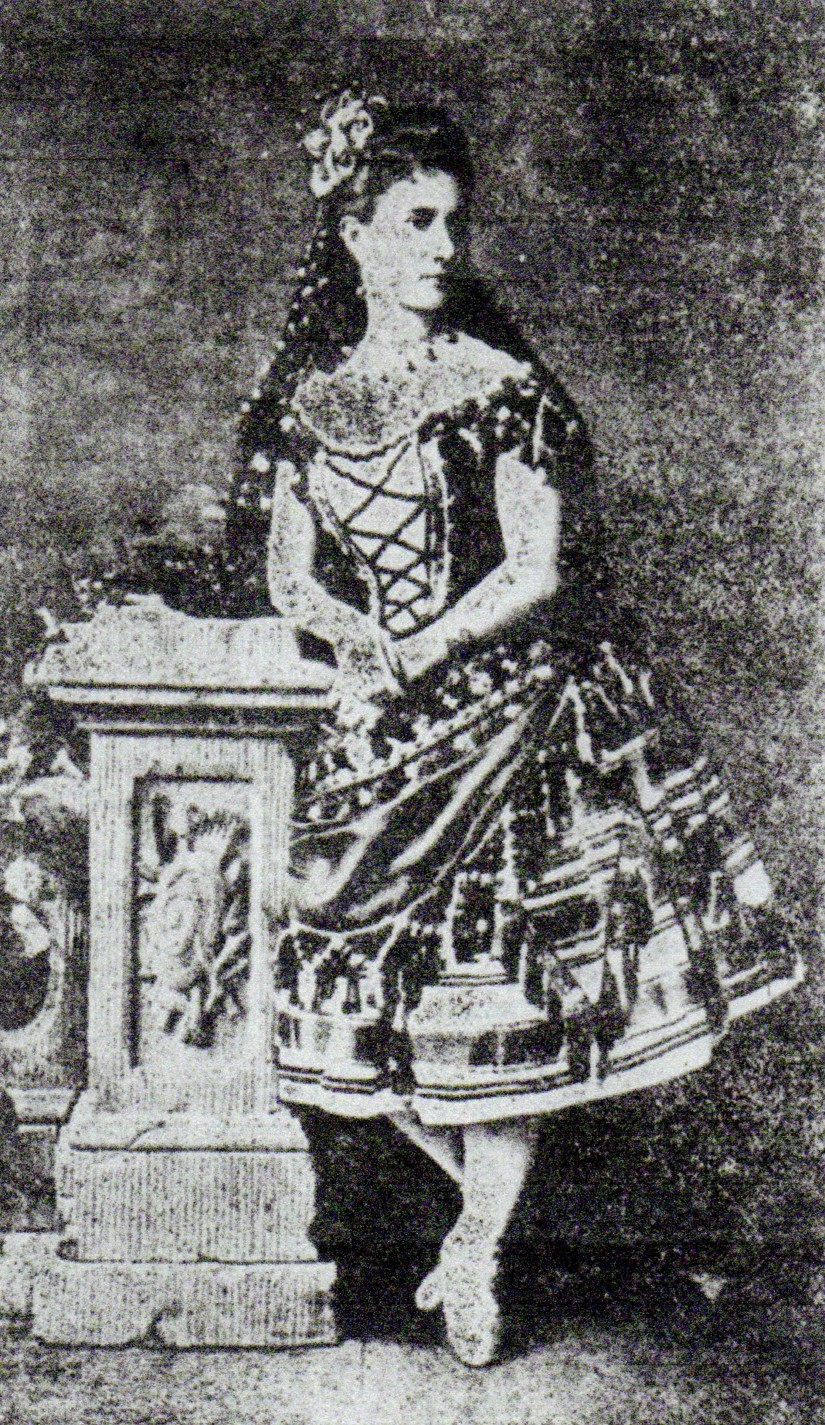
Ekaterina Vazem in the title role of Petipa's revival of Paquita. St. Petersburg, 1881

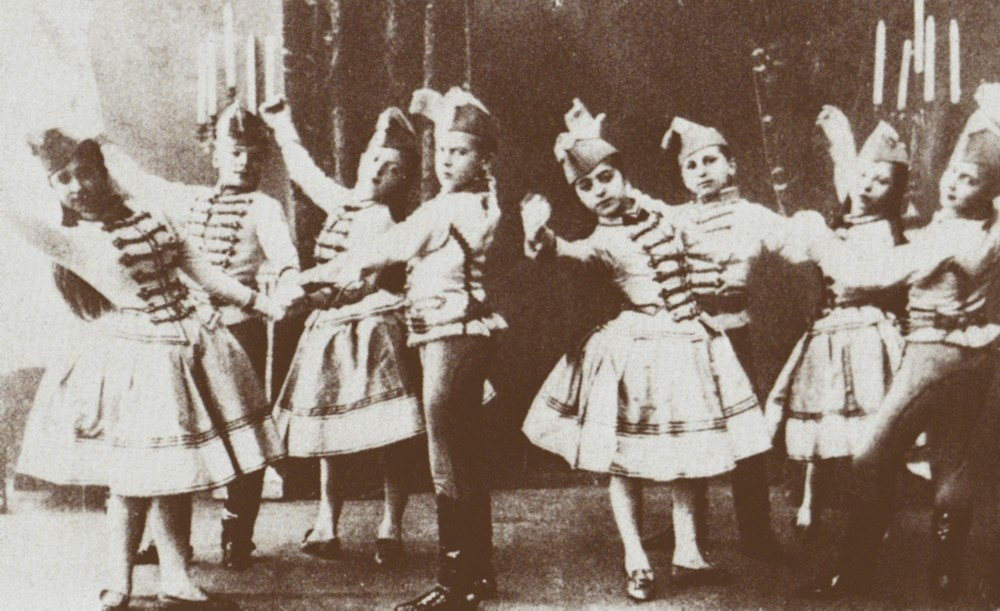
Students of the Imperial Ballet School in the Mazurka des enfants from Petipa's revival of Paquita. St. Petersburg, 1881

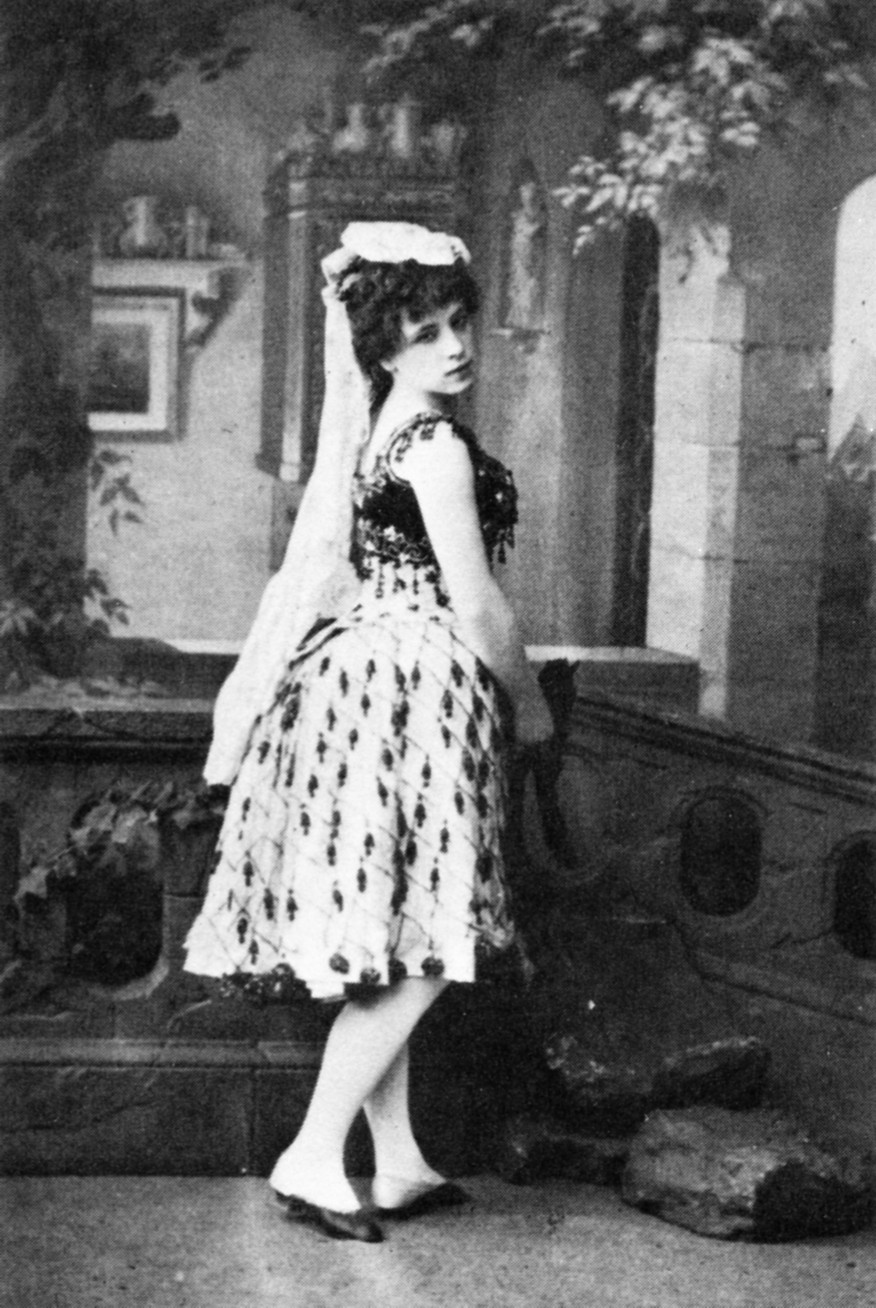
Virginia Zucchi in the title role of Paquita. St. Petersburg, 1886

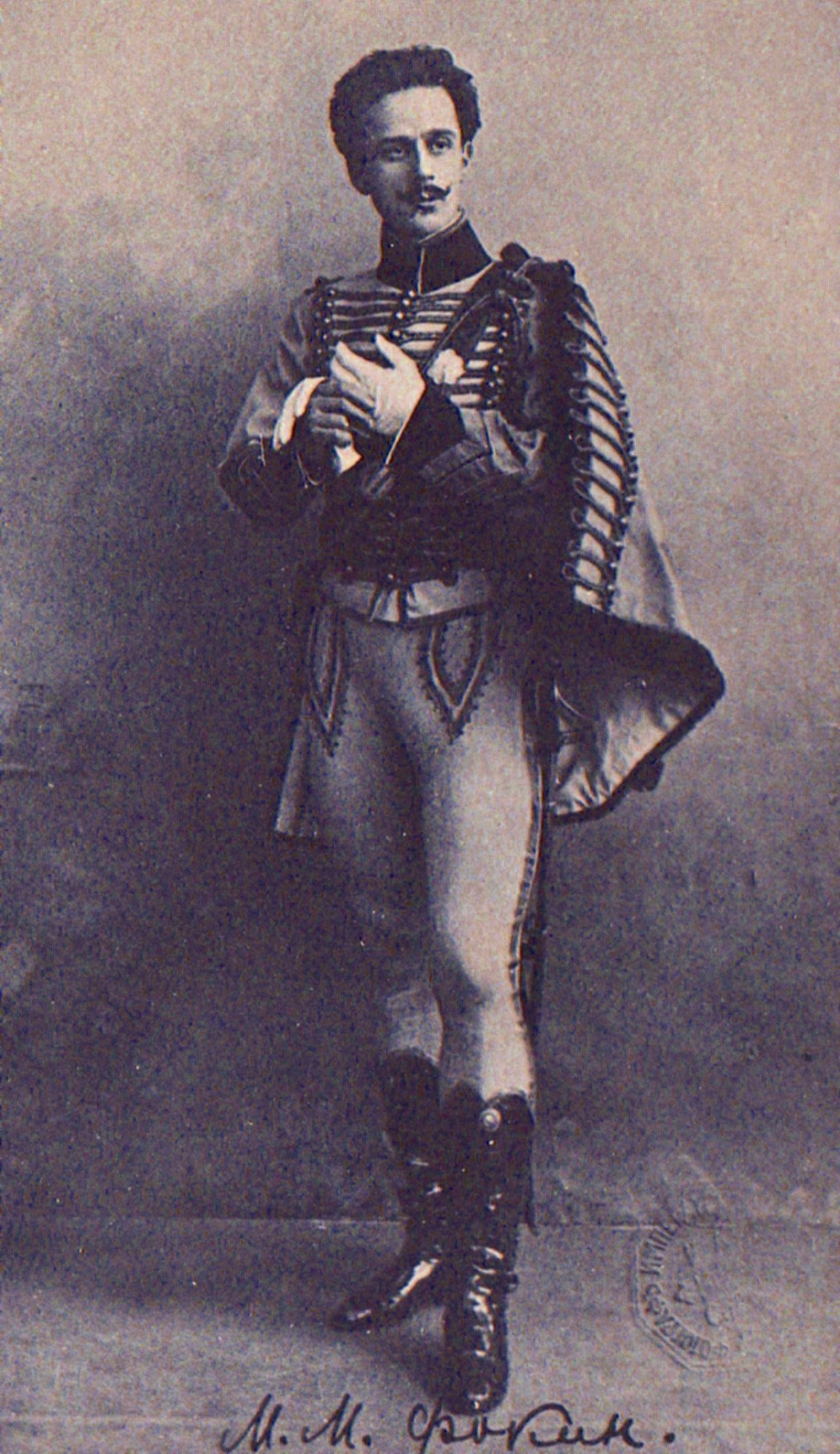
Mikhail Fokine costumed for the role of Lucien d'Hervilly in Paquita. St. Petersburg, 1898

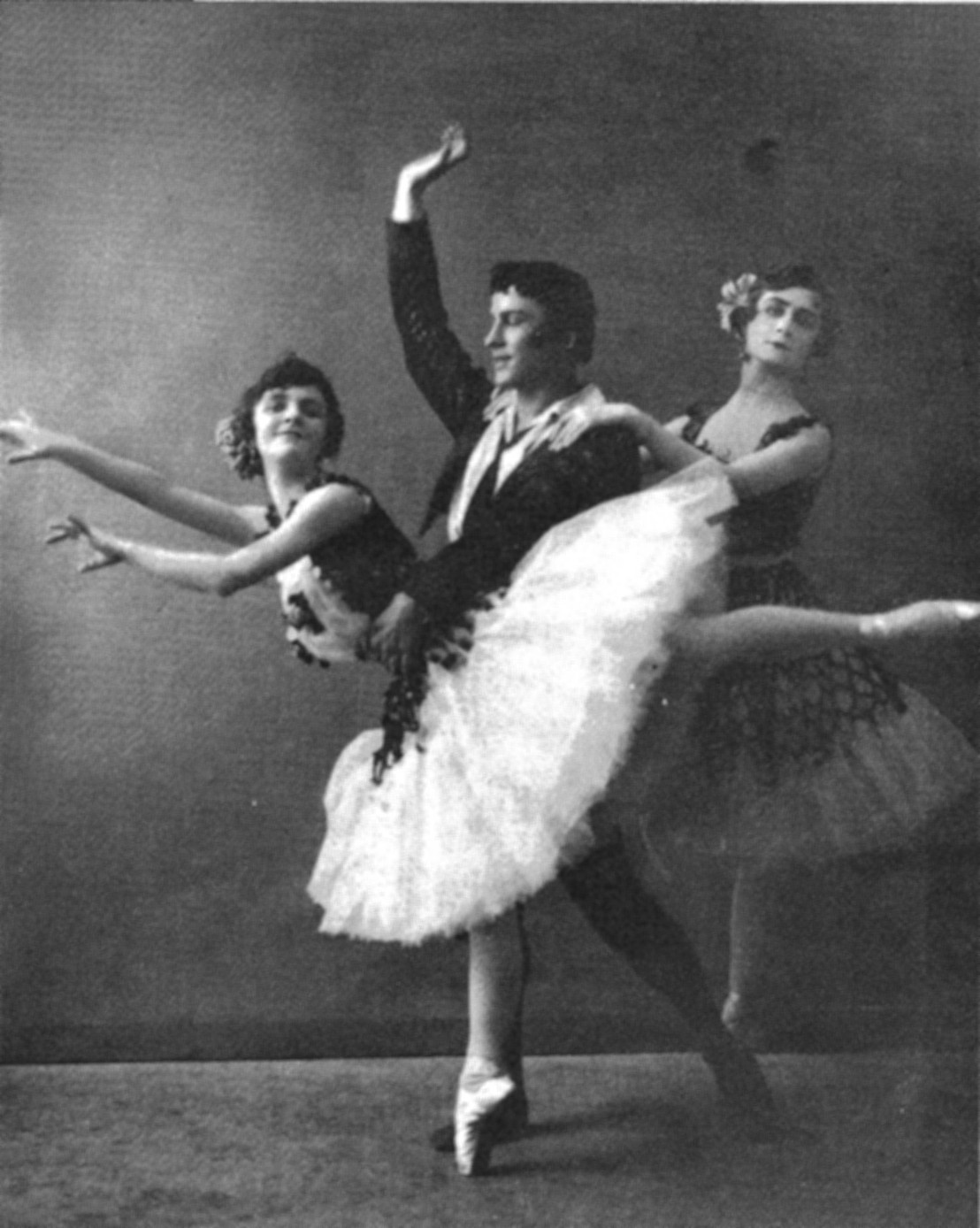
(left to right) Elsa Vill, Pierre Vladimirov and Elizaveta Gerdt in the Pas de trois from Paquita. St. Petersburg, 1909

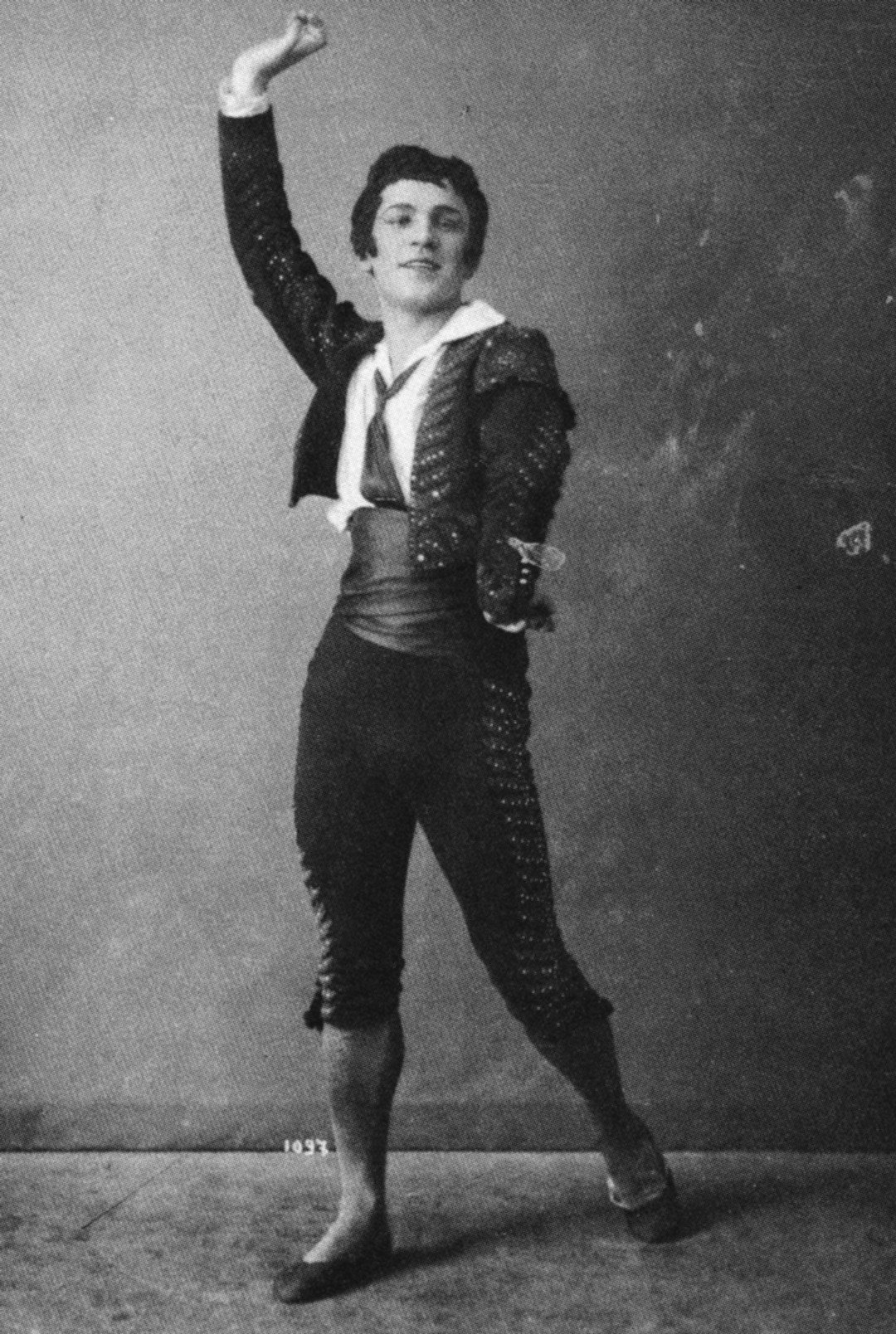
Pierre Vladimirov in the Pas de trois from Paquita. St. Petersburg, 1909

(clockwise from left) Erin Joseph, Patricia Barker, Bathurel Bold and Kimberley Davey in the Pacific Northwest Ballet's production of the Paquita grand pas classique. Seattle, 1998

== See also ==
- List of ballets by title
