= Boris Fitinhof-Schell =

Russian composer (1829–1901)

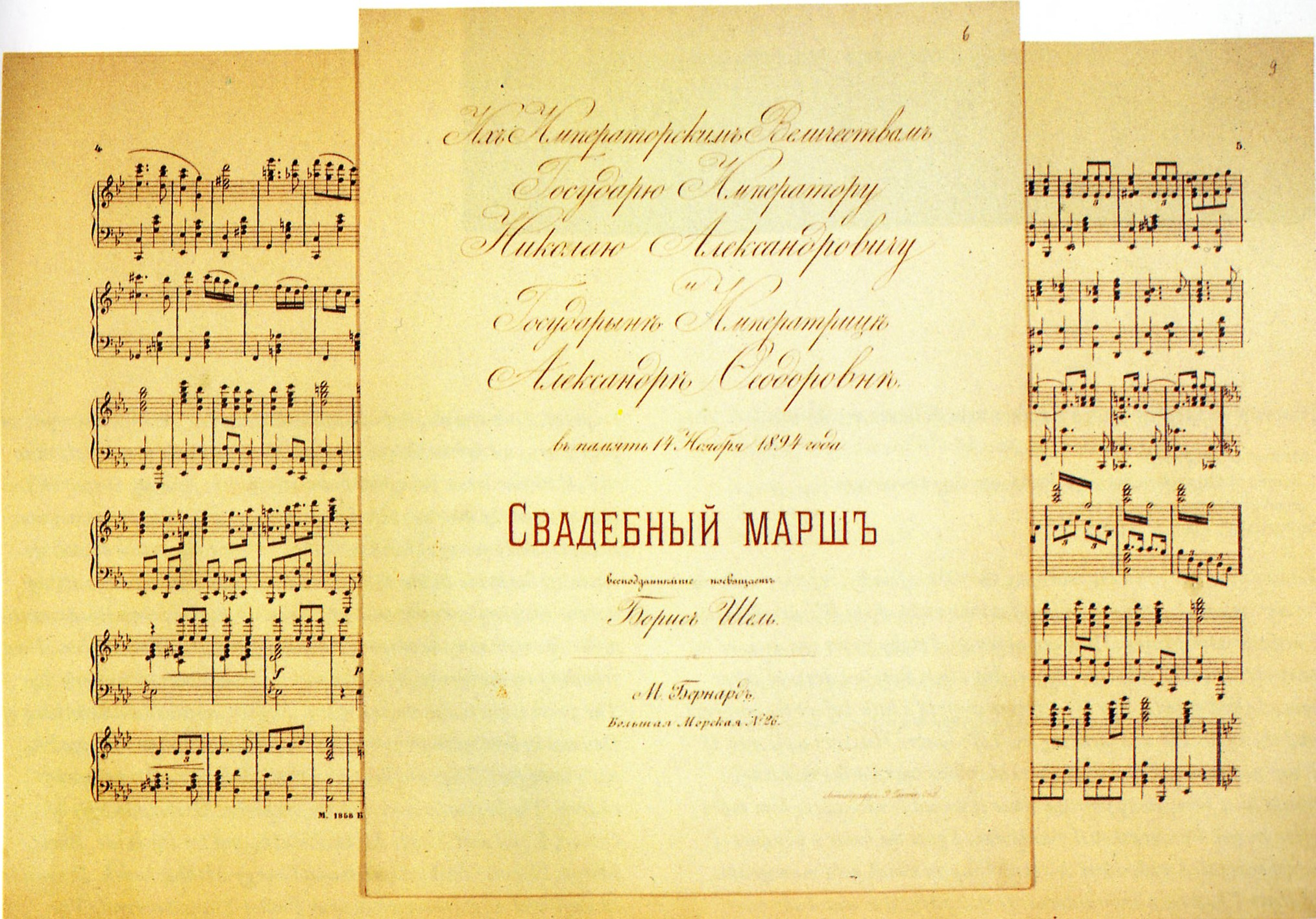
Piano reduction of the Wedding March written especially by Fitinhof-Schell for the wedding of Tsar Nicholas II and Empress Alexandra Fyodorovna in 1895

Baron Boris Alexandrovich Fitinhoff-Schell (Russian: Борис Александрович Фитингоф-Шель, romanized: Boris Aleksandrovich Fitingof-Shel; 26 August [O.S. 14 August] 1829 in Morshansk – 26 September [O.S. 13 September] 1901 in St. Petersburg, Russia) was a Russian composer of Baltic German descent.

== Biography ==
Fitinhoff-Schell was born to Baltic German noble Baron Alexander Otto von Vietinghoff genannt Scheel and Yelisevet Pavlovna Yazykova. The Vietinghoff family, was considered part of the Uradel (or old nobility), the family was of Westphalian origin, originating in Essen. The Baltic branch had moved to the Baltics since the 14th Century. Even though Boris’ father was a Lutheran, he was baptised an Orthodox, because his mother was a Russian.

Fitinhoff-Schell was trained at the Moscow Conservatory under Field and Henselt, and was a classmate of Tchaikovsky's. His most noted work are the ballets The Haarlem Tulip (1887) and Cinderella (1893), composed for the Imperial Ballet of St. Petersburg. He also scored four operas for the St. Petersburg Imperial Opera, which were commissioned by Ivan Vsevolozhsky, director of the Imperial Theatres. His Wedding March, scored especially for the wedding of Tsar Nicholas II and Empress Alexandra Fyodorovna is still occasionally heard.

Fitinhoff-Schell is also noted for his Fantastic Overture to his opera Mazeppa (1859, libretto by Prince Grigory Kugushev), in which whole-tone scales were profusely employed. Franz Liszt greatly appreciated this piece, describing its effect as " ... terrifying to all long and protruding ears." Liszt himself made use of the whole-tone scale in his Divina Commedia, illustrating the Inferno, and he used it systematically in his posthumously published organ and late piano pieces.

== Works ==
=== Operas ===
- Mazeppa (1859)
- Tamara (1886)
- Don Juan de Tenorio (1888)
- Mary Stuart (never performed)
- Heliodora (never performed)

=== Ballets ===
- The Haarlem Tulip (1885)
- Cinderella (1893)
