= The Harlem Tulip =

Ballet

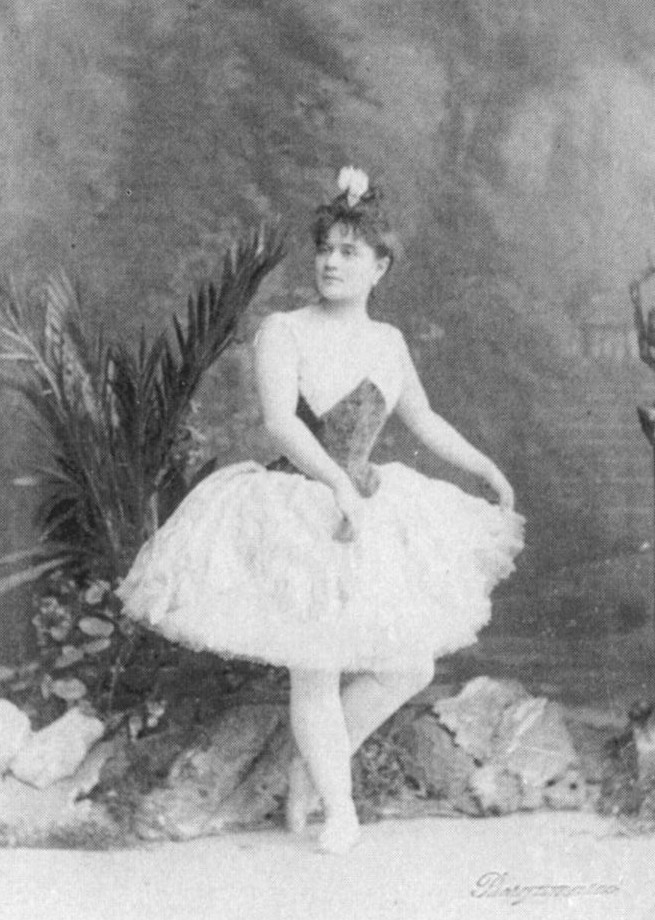
Emma Bessone as Emma in the Ivanov/Fintinhof-Schell The Haarlem Tulip, St. Petersburg, 1887.

La Tulipe de Haarlem (ru: Гарлемский тюльпан) is a fantastic ballet in three acts and four scenes, with choreography by Lev Ivanov and music by Baron Boris Fitinhoff-Schell, first presented by the Imperial Ballet on 16 October [O.S. 4 October] 1887 at the Imperial Mariinsky Theatre in St. Petersburg, Russia, with Emma Bessone (as Emma), Pavel Gerdt (as Peters), and Alfred Bekefy (as Andreas).

== Revivals ==
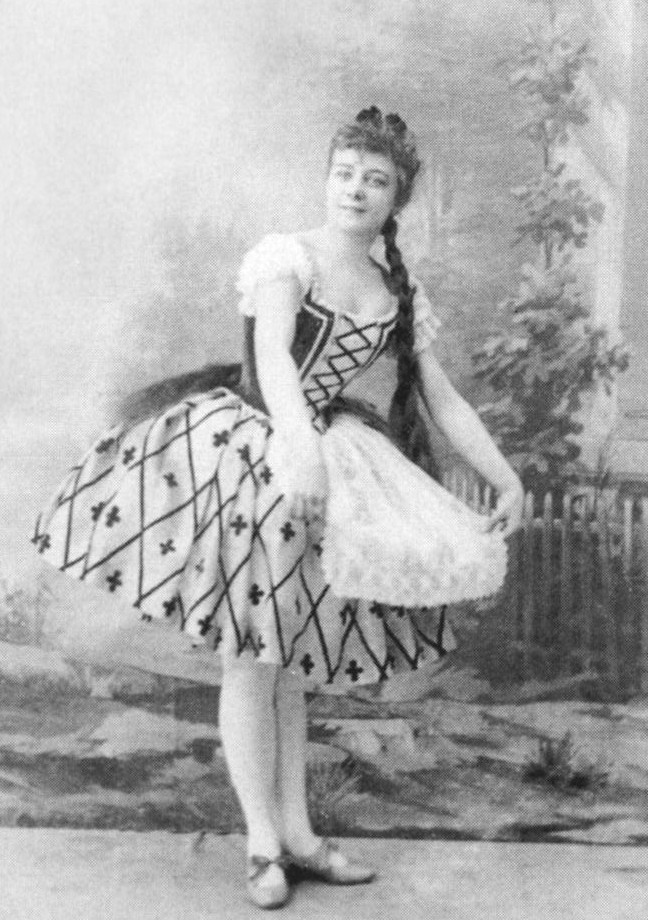
Mariia Anderson as Emma in the Ivanov/Fintinhof-Schell The Haarlem Tulip, St. Petersburg, 1892.

- Revival by Claudia Kulichevskaya and Pavel Gerdt under the title The Tulip Field for students of the Imperial Ballet School, first presented on 16 April [O.S. 3 April] 1902 in the school's theatre.
- Revival by Alexander Shiryaev for the Imperial Ballet. First presented on 29 April [O.S. 16 April] 1903 at the Imperial Mariinsky Theatre. Principal Dancers - Vera Trefilova (as Emma), Nikolai Legat (as Peters), and Gyorgy Kiaksht (as Andreas). With Tamara Karsavina, Elena Poliakova, and Mikhail Obukhov in the Pas de trois.
