= Praskovya Chernikova =

Russian opera singer

Praskovya Chernikova (Russian: Прасковья Петровна Черникова; died 1833), was a Russian stage actress and opera singer (mezzo-soprano). She was engaged at the Karl Knipper Theatre in St. Petersburg in 1777–1826, during which she was the leading lady and pioneer member of the first public theatre in St. Petersburg.
