= Grigory Kugushev =

Russian writer (1824–1871)

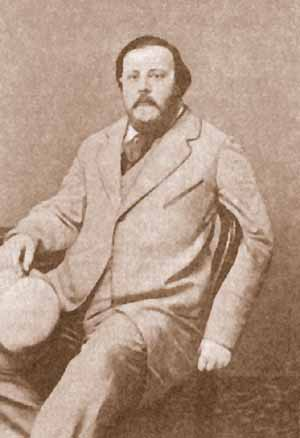
- Born: Grigory Vasilyevich Kugushev; Григорий Васильевич Кугушев; 17 April 1824; Akayevo, Tambov Governorate, Russian Empire
- Died: 3 October 1871 (aged 47); Moscow, Russian Empire
- Occupations: playwright, novelist, librettist

Prince Grigory Vasilyevich Kugushev (Russian: Григорий Васильевич Кугушев, 17 March 1824 – 3 October 1871) was a Russian writer, poet and playwright whose comedies, including Goluboi Kapot (Blue Hood), Pari (The Bet), Priyomysh (The Foster) had considerable, if not lasting, success in the Russian Imperial Theatres in 1850s. More substantial and critically acclaimed were Kugushev's works of fiction, notably Kornet Otletayev (Корнет Отлетаев, a three-part novella, first published by Russky Vestnik in 1856) and the four-part novel Postoronneye Vliyaniye (Постороннее влияние, The Outside Influence, 1858—1859). He also wrote the libretto for the epic drama opera Mazeppa (1859) by Baron Boris Fitinhof-Schell.
