= Elena Andreianova =

Russian dancer (1819–1857)

Elena Andreïanova
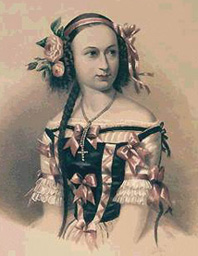
- Colour lithograph of Elena Andreyanova c. 1840s. From the State Museum of Theatre and Music Art, St. Petersburg
- Born: Елена Ивановна Андреянова; 13 July 1819; Saint Petersburg, Russian Empire
- Died: 28 October 1857 (aged 38); Paris, French Empire
- Occupation: Ballerina
- Years active: 1837–1857

Elena Ivanovna Andreïanova, sometimes spelt Yelena Andreyanova (Russian Елена Ивановна Андреянова), 13 July 1819 St. Petersburg - 28 October 1857 Paris, was a Russian ballerina. She is considered to be the outstanding Russian ballerina of the romantic genre, but her life was one full of tragedy.

== Biography ==
Little is known about her childhood. At ten-years of age she entered the St. Petersburg Drama school. Among her teachers were Philippe Taglioni and his daughter Marie Taglioni. She graduated in 1837, and joined the Mariinsky ballet troop where she was the first Russian dancer to interpret the title roles in Giselle (1842), La Peri (1844 ) and Paquita (1847).

She became the mistress of the Director of the Imperial Theater, Alexander Guedeonov. Antagonism developed between Guedenov and Andreianova when guest French ballerinas Marie Taglioni and Fanny Elssler, were given some of her parts and got acclaim from audiences instead of her. To placate his mistress, Guedenov sent her to star in the Moscow Bolshoi Ballet. But here a new set of rivalries took hold. Fans of the Bolshoi ballerinas were upset that their favourite dancers were displaced by the St Petersburg dancers especially their prima ballerina Catherine Sankovski. They booed Andreïanova and during one performance, instead of throwing flowers they threw a dead cat on the stage. The shocked Andreianova fainted. The audience relented and gave a standing ovation. She stayed on for 15 years at the Bolshoi.

She toured Europe in 1846 with a troop from the Bolshoi, appearing in Paris, Hamburg, Brussels and Milan. She struck audiences with her combination of grace and fire. A dispute arose with management of the Paris Opera, who not only did not pay her for her performances, but instead demanded a fee for giving the troop the opportunity to show their art. However this rebounded on the Paris Opera when Andreianova persuaded the leading Paris male ballet dancer Marius Petipa to abandon Paris and join her troop. In Italy she danced at "La Scala" and was rapturously received, medals were cast in her honour, something only given previously to the greatest performers like Marie Taglioni and Fanny Elssler.

The French choreographer Jules Perrot wrote two roles especially for her in his ballets: as the Black Fairy in Adana (1850), and the Countess Bertha in Wayward Wife (1851).

In 1852 Andreyanova visited London, but this tour turned out to be unsuccessful. Returning home, her relationship with Guedeonov ended when he took a new lover, and she was fired from the Imperial Theatres in 1854.

She decided to organise a tour of her own of the Russian provinces, taking with her artists from the Bolshoi Theatre and pupils from the Moscow Ballet School in a troop, led and managed by herself. The tour visited Kharkiv, Poltava, Kyiv, Voronezh, Tambov and Odesa. Andreyanova had the idea of a large two-act ballet for the tour called "The Fountain of Bakhchisarai" based on the poem of that name by Alexander Pushkin. Its premiere took place in Voronezh in 1854. The tour was unexpectedly interrupted that same year in Odesa when the Crimean War threatened the city with bombardment. The troupe was disbanded and the tour was not a financial success which put a great strain on Andreyanova.

The grueling demands of the tour undermined the health of many of the dancers but especially Andreyanova who bore the financial worries. She returned to St. Petersburg in ill health, and after some time, though still seriously ill, went to Paris for treatment.

She never recovered her health and died in Paris in 1857 from nervous exhaustion at the young age of 38 years . She is buried at the Pere Lachaise cemetery in the 20th arrondissement. Her grave stone was chosen by herself shortly before her death and represents Giselle leaning against a cross.

The Venusian crater Andreianova is named in her honor.
