= Saint Petersburg Imperial troupe =

Theatres for Russian tsars appeared as early as the 17th century, but only members of the Imperial family and their immediate circles could attend the performances.

Empress Elizabeth of Russia issued a Decree dated 30 August 1756, to establish a public Imperial troupe. The decree united in one system several different theatre companies, already existing. The theatre was given a mansion on Vasilievsky island, which housed a troupe headed by Fyodor Volkov. Alexander Sumarokov was appointed the Director of the theatre.

The troupe covered all theatrical arts: drama, ballet and opera. Every actor did what he could.

In 1801, the Moscow Imperial troupe appeared.

Private theatre companies in Moscow and St. Petersburg were banned until 1882.

The Imperial troupe lasted until the Russian revolution of 1917.

Theatres used by the St Petersburg Imperial troupe included:

- Home of opera at the edge of Neva (Невская першпектива; 1742–49)
- the Home of opera near the Summer Garden (Летний сад; 1750–63)
- the Theatre Free Russian or the theatre of Karl Knipper (founded in 1777; in 1783 is bought to imperial treasure; then called the Wooden City Theater (ru: Городской Деревянный театр) – on 1797)
- Hermitage Theatre (from 1785)
- the Imperial theater in the Gatchina Palace (to Paul I of Russia, the end of the 18th century)
- Bolshoi Kamenny Theatre (on 1784–1886)
- Imperial theatre of Petergof
- Alexandrinsky Theatre (from 1832; then the theatre became dramatic)
- Mikhaylovsky Theatre (from 1833)
- Mariinsky Theatre (from 1860)
