= Robert le diable =

1831 opera by Giacomo Meyerbeer

- Grand opera by Giacomo Meyerbeer
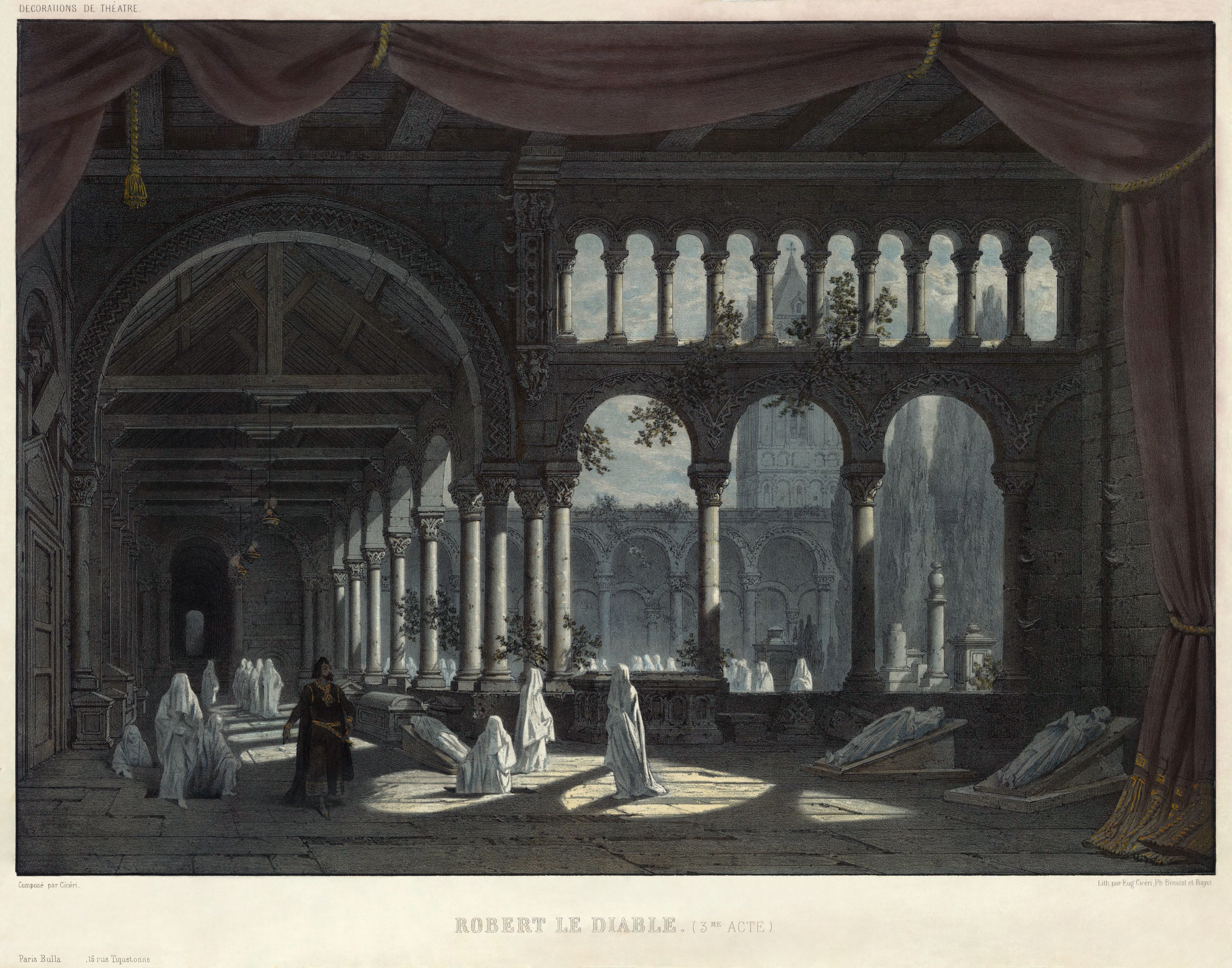
- Set for Act III in the première
- Translation: Robert the Devil
- Librettist: Eugène Scribe; Germain Delavigne
- Language: French
- Premiere: 21 November 1831; Paris Opéra

Robert le diable (Robert the Devil) is an opera in five acts composed by Giacomo Meyerbeer between 1827 and 1831, to a libretto written in French by Eugène Scribe and Germain Delavigne. Robert le diable is regarded as one of the first grand operas at the Paris Opéra. It has only a superficial connection to the medieval legend of Robert the Devil.

The opera was immediately successful from its first night on 21 November 1831 at the Opéra; the dramatic music, harmony and orchestration, its melodramatic plot, its star singers and its sensational stage effects compelled Frédéric Chopin, who was in the audience, to say, "If ever magnificence was seen in the theatre, I doubt that it reached the level of splendour shown in Robert...It is a masterpiece...Meyerbeer has made himself immortal". Robert initiated the European fame of its composer, consolidated the fame of its librettist Scribe, and launched the reputation of the new director of the Opéra, Louis-Désiré Véron, as a purveyor of a new genre of opera. It also had influence on development of the ballet, and was frequently mentioned and discussed in contemporary French literature.

Robert continued as a favourite in opera houses all over the world throughout the nineteenth century. After a period of neglect, it began to be revived towards the end of the twentieth century.

== Background ==
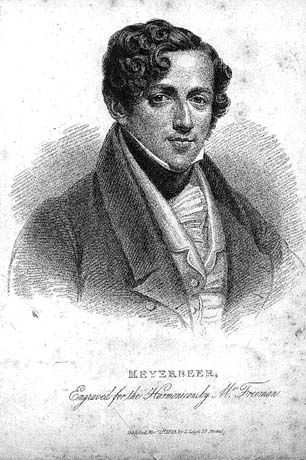
Meyerbeer, c. 1825, shortly before he commenced working on Robert.

Giacomo Meyerbeer's early studies had been in Germany, but from 1816 to 1825 he worked in Italy. There he studied opera, then dominated by Gioachino Rossini, and wrote his own Italian operas, which were moderately successful and also had some performances in other European countries. The success of Il crociato in Egitto (1824) throughout Europe, including at Paris in 1825, persuaded Meyerbeer, who was already thirty-three years old, to fulfil at last his ambition to base himself in Paris and to seek a suitable libretto for an opera to be launched there.

Meyerbeer first mentions Robert le diable in his diaries in February 1827. The Journal de Paris announced on 19 April 1827 that the libretto of Scribe and Delavigne had been passed by the censor and that 'the music is to be entrusted to a composer, M. Meyer-Beer, who, having acquired a brilliant reputation in Germany and Italy, is extending it to our country, where several of his works have been already successfully represented.'

The libretto was fabricated on the basis of old legends about Duke Robert the Magnificent of Normandy, the father of William the Conqueror, alleged in some versions to have been the son of the Devil. The librettists padded out this outline with a variety of melodramatic incidents. The plot reflected 'the fantastic legendary elements which fascinated the opera public of 1830', a taste which had evolved from the 1824 Paris production of Carl Maria von Weber's Der Freischütz (in its French version Robin des bois), which also features a doubtful hero befriended by a demon promising him success.

The libretto was originally planned as a three-act opéra comique for the Opéra-Comique theatre. Meyerbeer stopped work on the opera in 1827 when the theatre underwent financial difficulties. In August 1829, the composer and librettists agreed to refashion the work in a five-act form to meet the requirements of the Paris Opéra. This entailed some significant rewriting of the storyline, reducing the essentially comic role of Raimbaut (who vanishes after Act 3 in the final version, but whose antics – including the spending of Bertram's money – continued throughout in the earlier libretto). It also meant that the traditional 'pairing' of lovers in opéra comique (Robert/Isabelle paralleled throughout by the 'lower-class' Raimbaut/Alice) was swept aside in favour of concentration on the more sensational story-line of Robert's diabolic ancestry.

The contract for the opera, specifying it as a "grand opera in five acts and seven scenes", was signed by the then director of the Opéra, Émile Lubbert, on 29 December 1829. Meyerbeer completed the composition of the work in Spa, Belgium in June and July 1830. Its characterisation as a "French grand opera" placed it in succession to Auber's La muette de Portici (1828) and Rossini's William Tell (1829) in this new genre. The composer undertook further work on the opera in early 1831, converting spoken passages to recitatives and adding ballet episodes, including, in Act 3, the "Ballet of the Nuns", which was to prove one of the opera's great sensations, and which Henri Duponchel had suggested to replace the original humdrum scenario set in Olympus. He also rewrote the two major male roles of Bertrand and Robert to suit the talents of Nicolas Levasseur and Adolphe Nourrit, respectively.

== Performance history ==
=== Premiere seasons in Paris ===
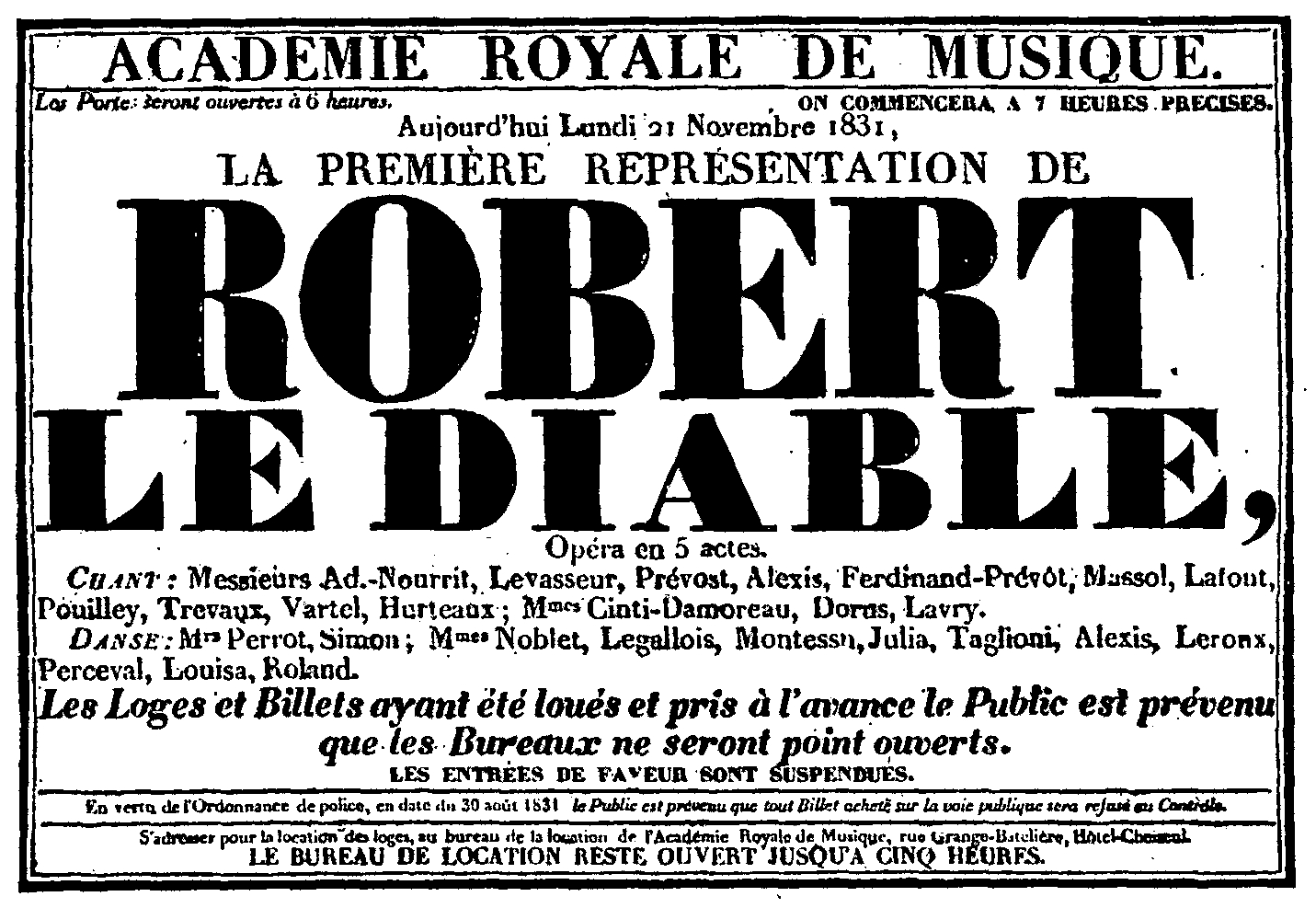
Poster for the 1831 first performance

The opera premiered on 21 November 1831 at the Paris Opéra. The success owed much to the opera's star singers – Levasseur as Bertram, Nourrit as Robert — and to the provocative "Ballet of the Nuns" in the third act, featuring the great ballerina Marie Taglioni.

The choreography for the ballet was elaborated by the ballerina's father, Filippo Taglioni. The audience's prurient delight in this scandalous scene is well conveyed by the reviewer for the Revue des Deux-Mondes:

A crowd of mute shades glides through the arches. All these women cast off their nuns' costume, they shake off the cold powder of the grave; suddenly they throw themselves into the delights of their past life; they dance like bacchantes, they play like lords, they drink like sappers. What a pleasure to see these light women...

The set for the ballet was an innovative and striking design by Henri Duponchel and Pierre-Luc-Charles Ciceri. Duponchel had also introduced technical innovations for the staging, including 'English traps' for the sudden appearance and disappearance of the ghosts. (Meyerbeer was led to complain that the spectacle was too much and was pushing his music into the background). Taglioni danced the Abbess only six times in Paris; she was replaced by Louise Fitzjames, (who danced the role 232 times).

At the invitation of Nourrit, Cornélie Falcon made her debut at the age of 18 at the Opéra in the role of Alice on 20 July 1832. The cast included Nourrit. Although suffering from stage fright, Falcon managed to sing her first aria without error, and finished her role with "ease and competence." Her tragic demeanor and dark looks were highly appropriate to the part, and she made a vivid impression on the public, which included on that night Auber, Berlioz, Halévy, Maria Malibran, Giulia Grisi, Honoré Daumier, Alexandre Dumas and Victor Hugo. On hearing her in the role, Meyerbeer himself declared his opera at last 'complete'.

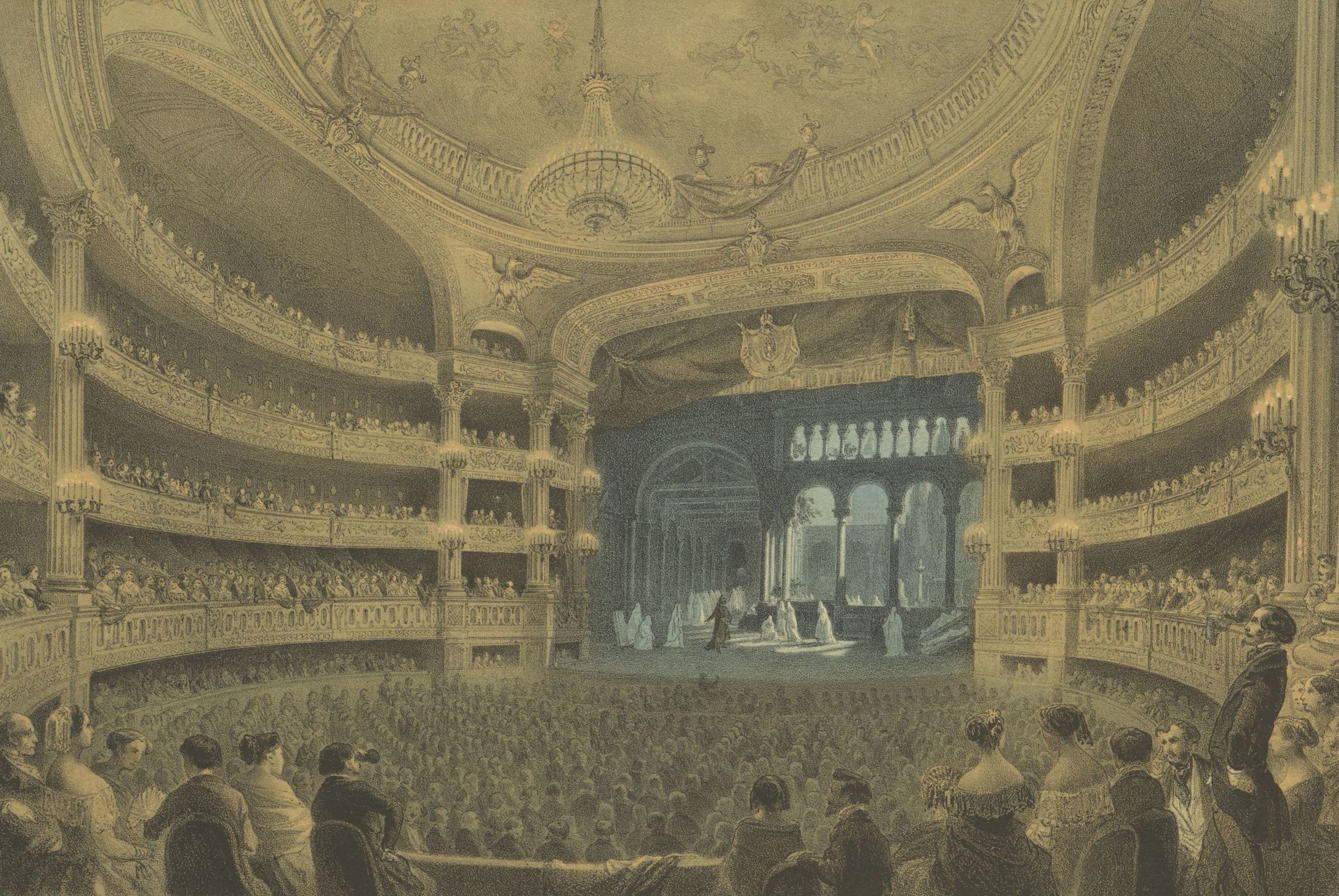
Act 3 scene 2 of Robert at the Paris Opéra (Salle Le Peletier), 1831

By April 1834 the opera had received over 100 performances in Paris. Nourrit sang the role of Robert until 1837, when he was replaced as premier tenor at the Opéra by Gilbert Duprez, whom, however, Meyerbeer did not like in the role; nor did he approve of an alternative, Lafont. However, he was impressed by the newcomer Mario (Cavaliere Giovanni Matteo di Candia), and wrote for him a new aria for Robert which was performed at his debut in the revival of the opera on 30 November 1838. Mario's debut was the launch of his very successful career. Others singing in the 1838 revival included Julie Dorus-Gras (Alice), Prosper Dérivis (Bertram) and François Wartel (Raimbaut). By Meyerbeer's death in 1864 the opera had been performed over 470 times in Paris alone.

=== Early performances outside Paris ===
A succession of representations throughout Europe and in the Americas launched Meyerbeer's international fame. A version of the opera – under the title of The Fiend-Father, by Rophino Lacy – was first presented in London at the Theatre Royal, Drury Lane on 20 February 1832; the original version appeared at the Haymarket Theatre on 11 June of that year. Lacy's version was given in New York on 7 April 1834. In 1832 the opera reached Berlin, Strasbourg, Dublin and Liège; in 1833 Brussels, Copenhagen, Vienna and Marseilles; in 1834 Lyon, Budapest, The Hague, Amsterdam and Saint Petersburg; in 1835 (12 May) it obtained its first American performance in the original French at the Théâtre d'Orléans in New Orleans. Italian versions were given in Lisbon in 1838, and in Florence in 1840.

Meyerbeer took particular care over the first London and Berlin productions. He travelled to London to check the singers and production for the original version, and requested that the German translation for Berlin be undertaken by the poet Ludwig Rellstab, strongly recommending that Taglioni and her father Fillipo be re-engaged, and that Ciceri's sets should be reproduced. Although Taglioni danced and the sets were retained, the translation was eventually carried out by Meyerbeer's friend Theodor Hell. Meyerbeer wrote additional ballet music for Taglioni for the Berlin production.

The Danish choreographer August Bournonville saw Fitzjames's performance as the Abbess in Paris in 1841, and based his own choreography, which was used in Copenhagen between 1833 and 1863, on this. This choreography, which has been fully preserved, represents the only record of Filippo Taglioni's original.

In 1847 Felix Mendelssohn attended a London performance of Robert – an opera which musically he despised – in order to hear Jenny Lind's British debut, in the role of Alice. The music critic Henry Chorley, who was with him, wrote "I see as I write the smile with which Mendelssohn, whose enjoyment of Mdlle. Lind's talent was unlimited, turned round and looked at me, as if a load of anxiety had been taken off his mind."

=== Twentieth century ===
During the early twentieth century, Meyerbeer's operas gradually disappeared from the stage, partly due to their length and expense to mount, partly due to their denigration by supporters of Wagnerian opera. In 1898, George Bernard Shaw, in The Perfect Wagnerite, had already cast scorn on Robert and commented that "Nowadays young people cannot understand how anyone could have taken Meyerbeer's influence seriously."

Nevertheless, productions of Robert included those in New Orleans and Nice in 1901, Paris (at the Gaité Lyrique) in 1911, Barcelona in 1917, at the Vienna Volksoper in 1921 and Bordeaux in 1928. The first production after the Second World War was in Florence in 1968, a shortened version with a cast including Renata Scotto and Boris Christoff. In 1984 the revival at the Paris Opéra with Rockwell Blake (Robert), Samuel Ramey (Bertram), Walter Donati (Raimbaut), Michèle Lagrange (Alice) and June Anderson (Isabelle) was the first performance there since 1893. In 1999 a new production was mounted at the Prague State Opera.

A performance of a new critical edition of Robert le diable by Wolfgang Kühnhold was presented at the Berlin State Opera in March 2000 with Jianyi Zhang (Robert), Stephan Rügamer (Raimbaut), Kwangchul Youn (Bertram), Marina Mescheriakova (Alice), and Nelly Miricioiu (Isabelle), conducted by Marc Minkowski.

=== Twenty-first century ===
A new production of the opera, directed by Laurent Pelly, was premiered at the Royal Opera House London on 6 December 2012, the first time it had been performed there since 1890.

At La Monnaie, Brussels, there were concert performances of Robert le Diable in April 2019, with Dmitry Korchak as Robert, Nicolas Courjal as Bertram and Lisette Oropesa as Isabelle, conducted by Evelino Pidò.

== Roles ==
Roles, voice types, and premiere cast
Role	Voice type	Premiere cast, 21 November 1831 (Conductor: François Habeneck)
Robert, Duke of Normandy	tenor	Adolphe Nourrit
Isabelle, Princess of Sicily Palmide	soprano	Laure Cinti-Damoreau
Bertram, Robert's friend	bass-baritone	Nicolas Levasseur
Alice, Robert's half-sister and Raimbaut's fiancée	soprano	Julie Dorus-Gras
Raimbaut, a minstrel	tenor	Marcelin Lafont
Alberti, a knight	bass	Jean-Pierre Hurteau
Herald	tenor	Jean-Étienne-Auguste Massol
Lady-in-waiting to Isabelle	soprano	Lavry
Priest	bass	
Prince of Granada	silent	
Hėléna, Abbess	ballerina	Marie Taglioni

== Synopsis ==
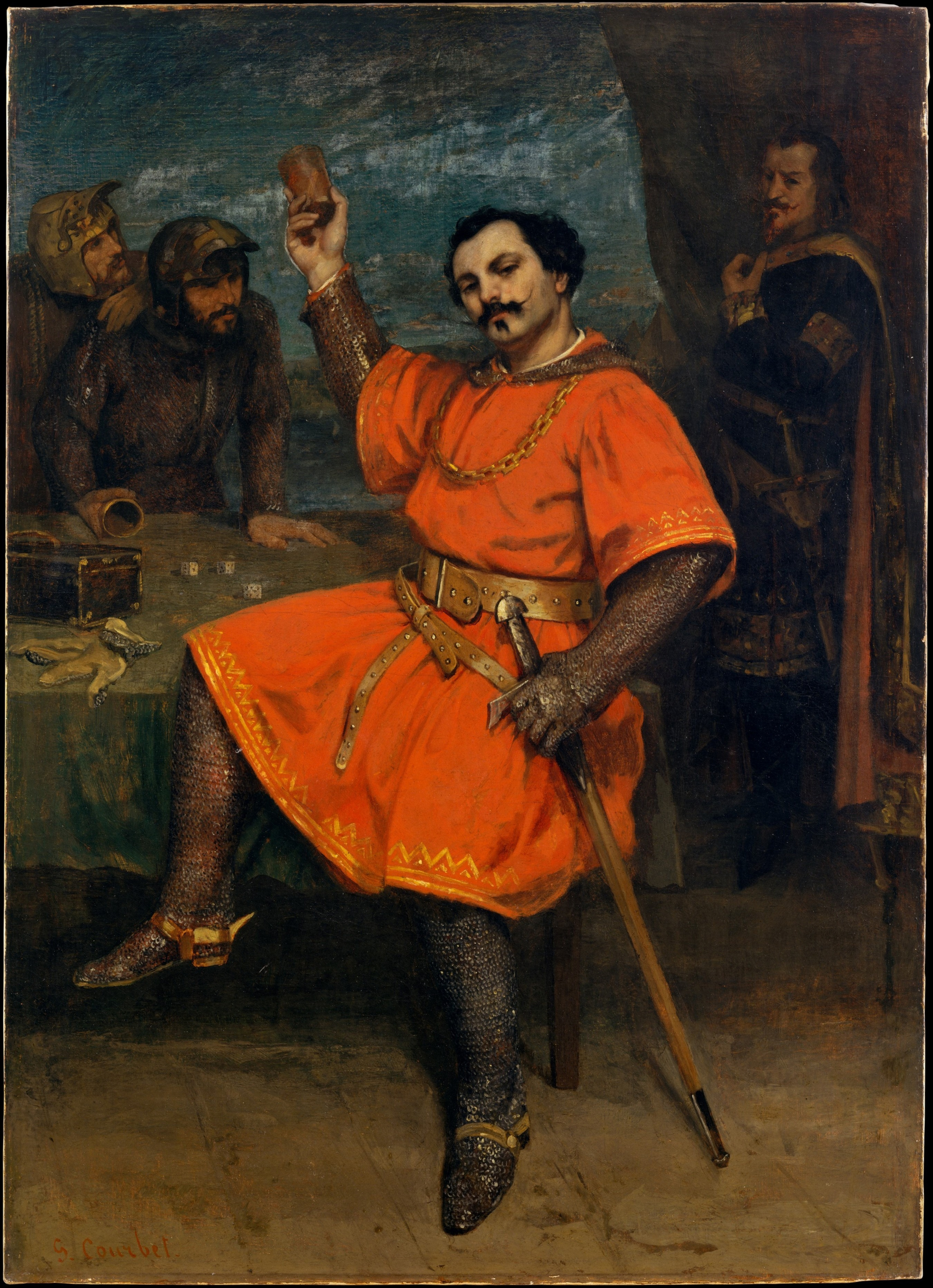
Guéymard as Robert (Courbet, 1857)

The plot of the opera has been often cut or rearranged in various productions. The outline given below follows the description given in The New Grove Dictionary of Opera (1992).

=== Act 1 ===
On the shore at Palermo

Robert and his mysterious friend Bertram are among a group of knights who are preparing to compete in a tournament for the hand of Princess Isabelle. They all praise wine, women and gambling (Versez à tasses pleines). Robert's attendant Raimbaut sings a ballad about a beautiful princess from Normandy who married a devil; the princess had a son, Robert, known as 'le diable'. Robert indignantly reveals that he is the son in question and condemns Raimbaut to death. Raimbaut begs for pardon and tells Robert that he is engaged to marry. Robert relents and relishes the thought of the droit du seigneur. Raimbaut's fiancée arrives; Robert recognizes her as his foster-sister Alice and pardons Raimbaut. Alice tells Robert that his mother has died and that her last words were a warning about a threatening dark force (Va! Va! dit-elle). She offers Robert his mother's will. Robert is too overcome to read it and asks Alice to keep it for the present. Robert expresses his longing for his beloved Isabelle and Alice offers to take a letter to her. Alice warns Robert to beware of Bertram but he ignores her. With Bertram's encouragement, Robert gambles with the knights and loses all of his money, as well as his armour.

=== Act 2 ===
A room in the palace at Palermo

Isabelle is sad at Robert's absence and expresses her unease that their marriage will never take place (En vain j’espère). She is delighted when she receives Robert's letter. Robert arrives and the pair express their pleasure at being together again. Isabelle provides him with new armour for the tournament. Robert is preparing for the tournament when Bertram suddenly appears and persuades Robert to go to a nearby forest, claiming that the Prince of Granada, his rival for Isabelle's love, wants to fight with him. When Robert has left, the court gathers to celebrate the marriage of six couples with dancing. The Prince of Granada enters and asks Isabelle to present him with arms for the tournament. Isabelle expresses her sorrow at Robert's disappearance but prepares to open the tournament, singing in praise of chivalry (La trompette guerrière).

=== Act 3 ===
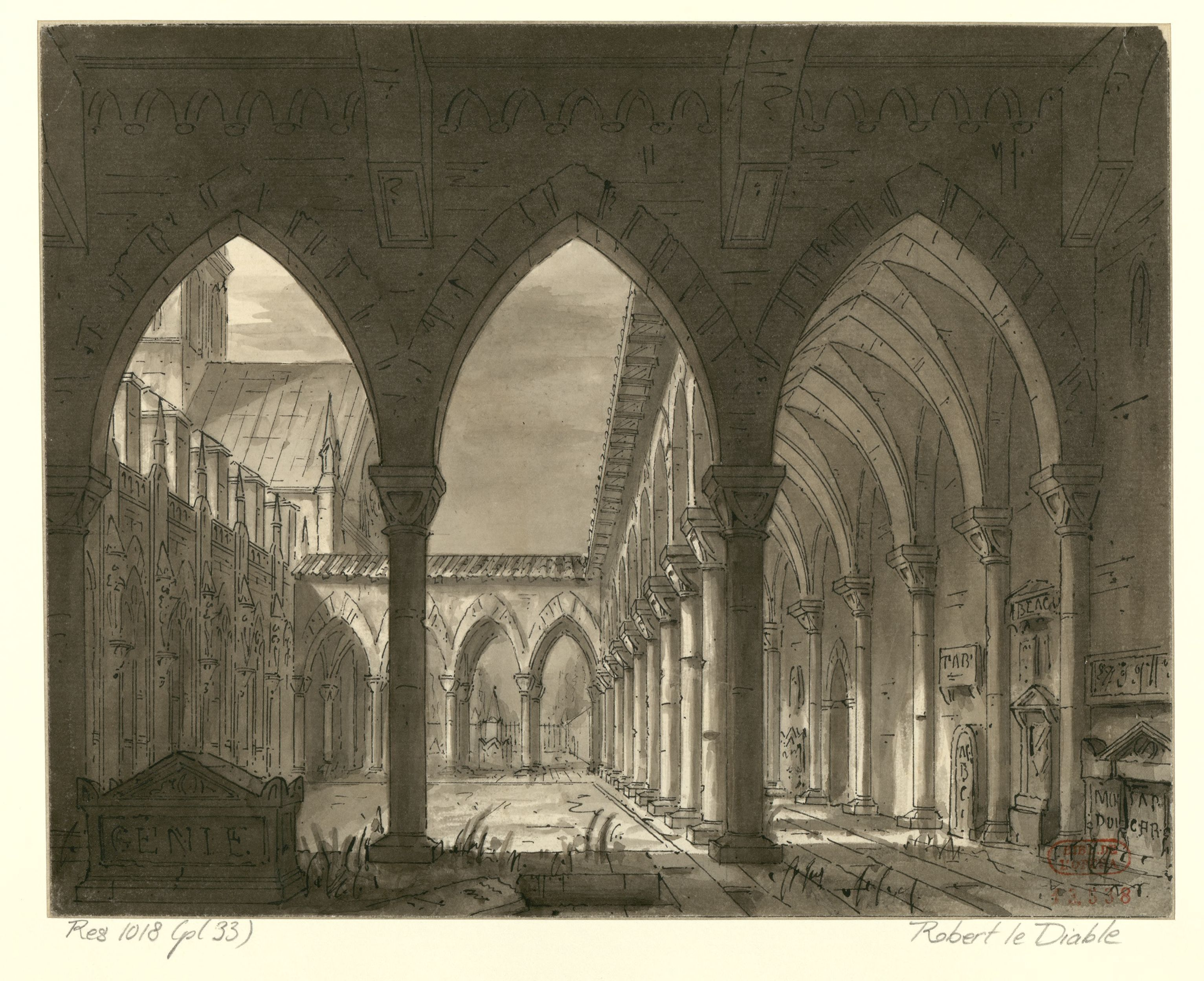
Sketch of an unused design for Act 3, scene 2 (Ciceri, c. 1831)

The countryside near Palermo

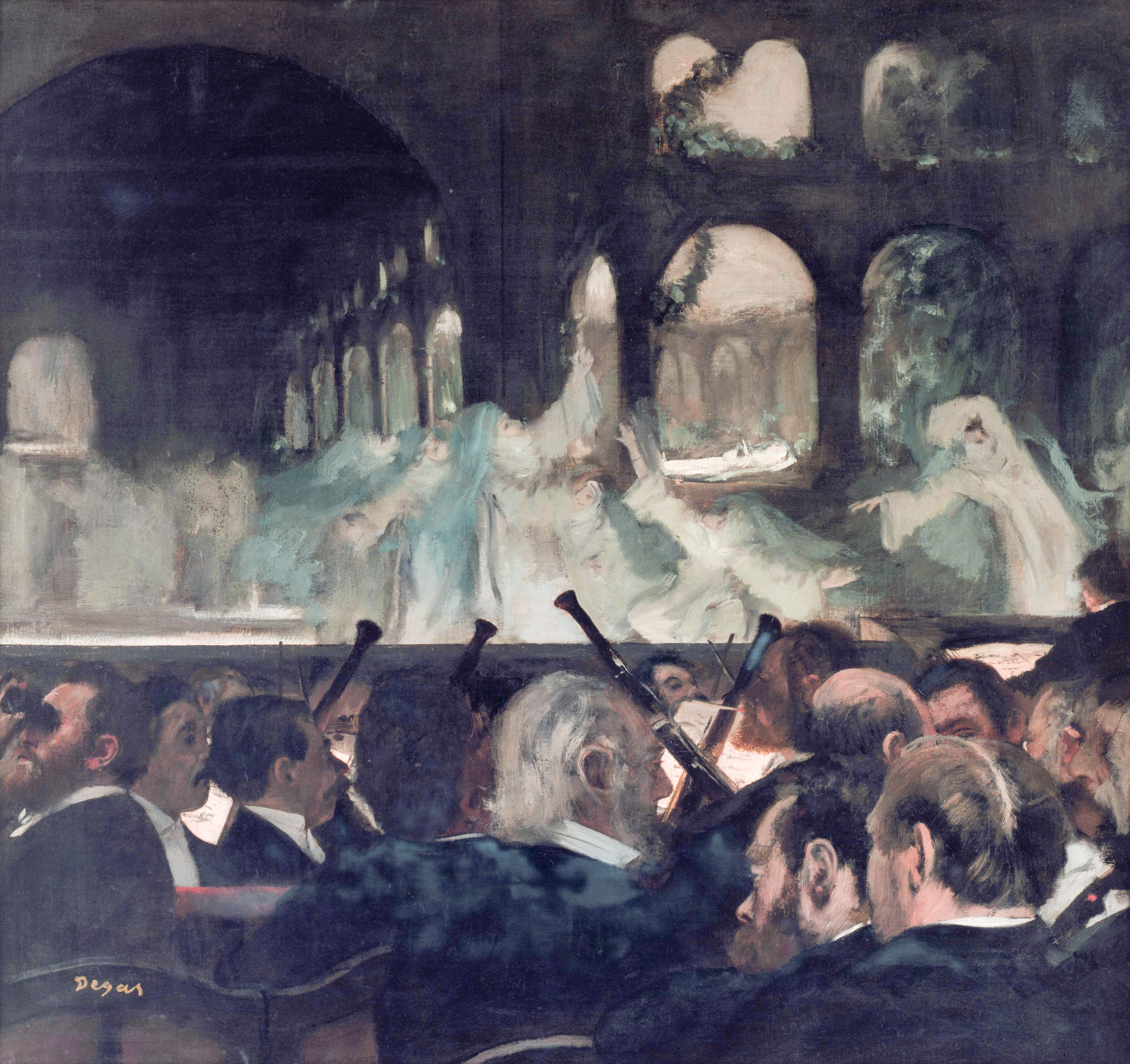
Degas: "Ballet of the Nuns" from Act 3 of Robert le diable (1876 version)

Bertram meets Raimbaut, who has arrived for an assignation with Alice. He gives him a bag of gold and advises him not to marry Alice as his new wealth will attract plenty of women (Ah! l’honnête homme). Raimbaut leaves and Bertram gloats at having corrupted him. Bertram reveals that Robert, to whom he is truly devoted, is his son; he then enters an adjoining cave to commune with the spirits of hell. Alice enters and expresses her love for Raimbaut (Quand je quittai la Normandie). She overhears strange chanting coming from the cave and decides to listen; she learns that Bertram will lose Robert forever if he cannot persuade him to sign away his soul to the Devil by midnight. On emerging from the cave, Bertram realizes that Alice has heard everything (Mais Alice, qu’as-tu donc?). He threatens her and she promises to keep silent. Robert arrives, mourning the loss of Isabelle, and Bertram tells him that to win her he should seize a magic branch from the tomb of Saint Rosalia in a nearby deserted cloister. Although to take it is sacrilege, the branch will give Robert magical powers. Robert declares that he will be bold and do as Bertram instructs. Bertram leads Robert to the cloister. The ghosts of nuns rise from their tombs, beckoned by Bertram, and dance, praising the pleasures of drinking, gambling and lust. Robert seizes the branch and fends off the demons who surround him.

=== Act 4 ===
A room in the palace

Isabelle is preparing for her marriage with the Prince of Granada. Alice rushes in to inform her of what she has learnt about Robert, but she is interrupted by envoys of the Prince who enter bearing gifts. Robert arrives and, using the power of the branch, freezes everyone except himself and Isabelle.

Unsettled by the power he's wielding, he confesses to Isabelle that he is using witchcraft, but begs her not to reject him. She expresses her love for him and implores him to repent (Robert, toi que j'aime). Robert breaks the branch and the spell it has created, and is taken into custody by Isabelle's attendants.

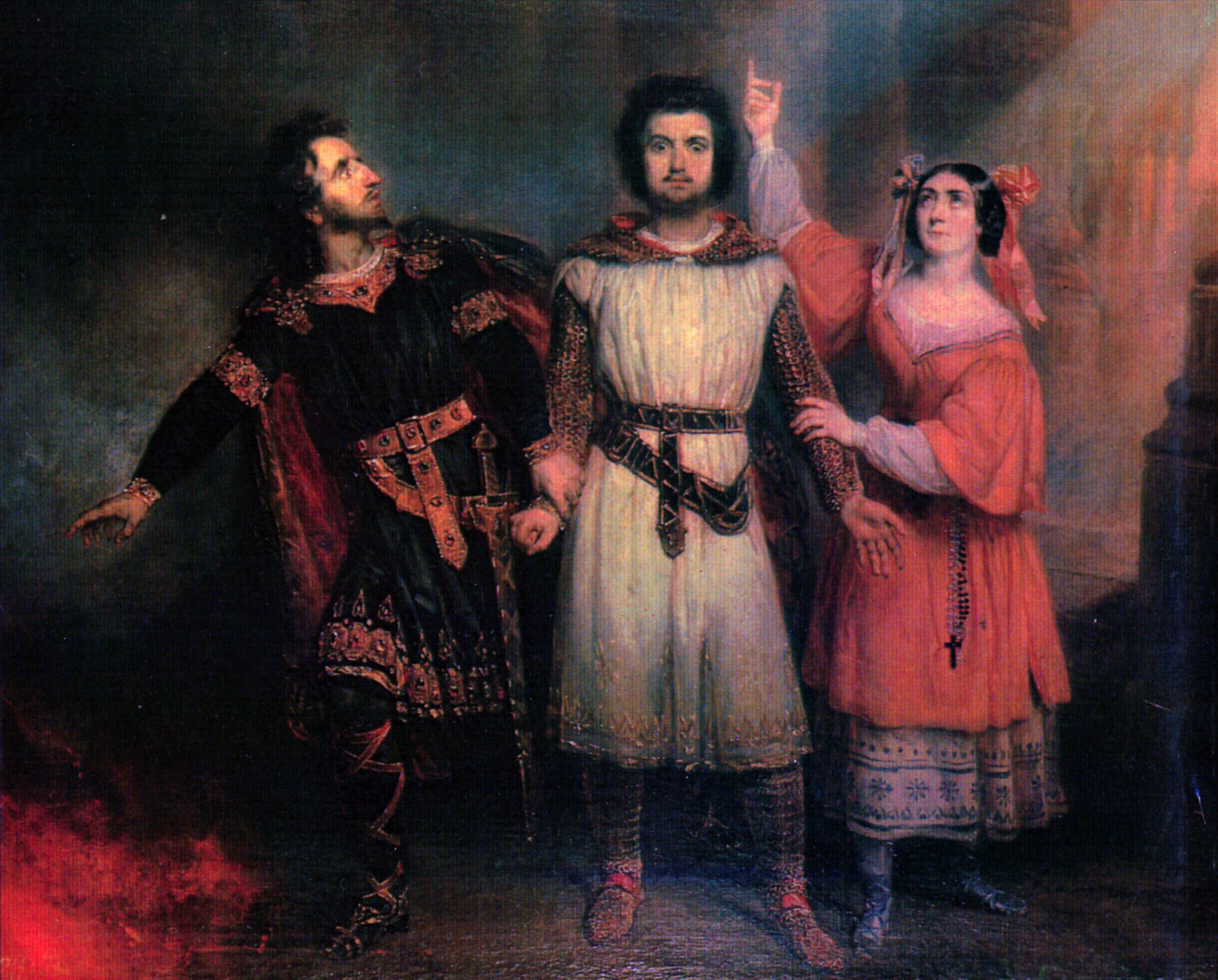
Act 5 scene 1, with Levasseur, Nourrit, and Falcon, as painted by the costume designer, François-Gabriel Lépaulle (1835)

=== Act 5 ===
Outside Palermo Cathedral

A group of monks extol the power of the Church. Bertram has freed Robert from the guards and the two arrive to prevent the marriage of Isabelle to the Prince of Granada. Bertram attempts to get Robert to sign a document in which he promises to serve Bertram for all eternity. He reveals to Robert that he is his true father and Robert decides to sign the oath from filial devotion. Before he can do so, Alice appears with the news that the Prince has been prevented from marrying Isabelle. Alice prays for divine help (Dieu puissant, ciel propice) and hands Robert his mother's will. Robert reads his mother's message, in which she warns him to beware the man who seduced and ruined her. Robert is wracked by indecision. Midnight strikes and the time for Bertram's coup is past. He is drawn down to hell. Robert is reunited with Isabelle in the cathedral, to great rejoicing.

== Costume designs for the first production ==
The costumes were designed by François-Gabriel Lépaulle.

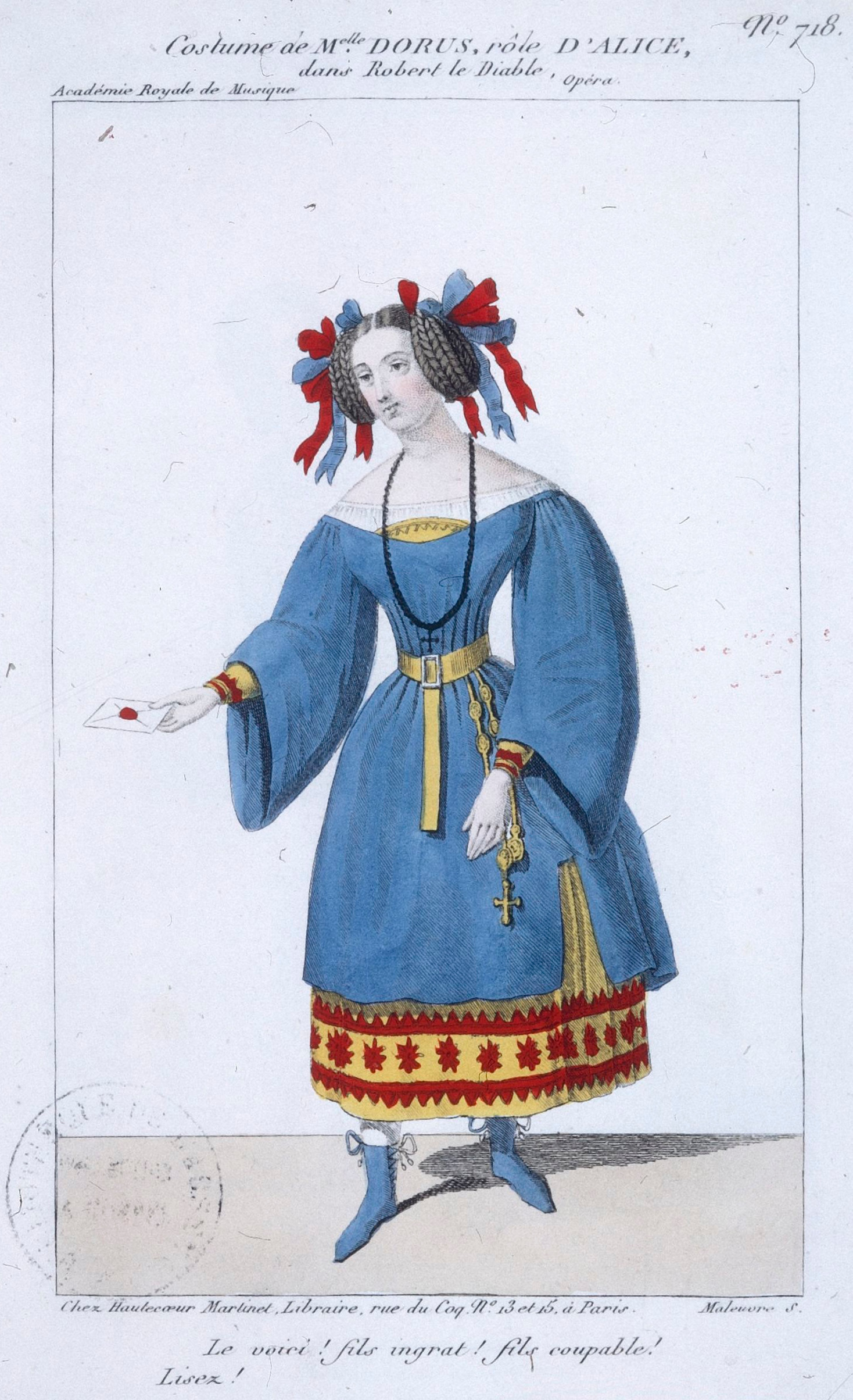
Dorus-Gras as Alice

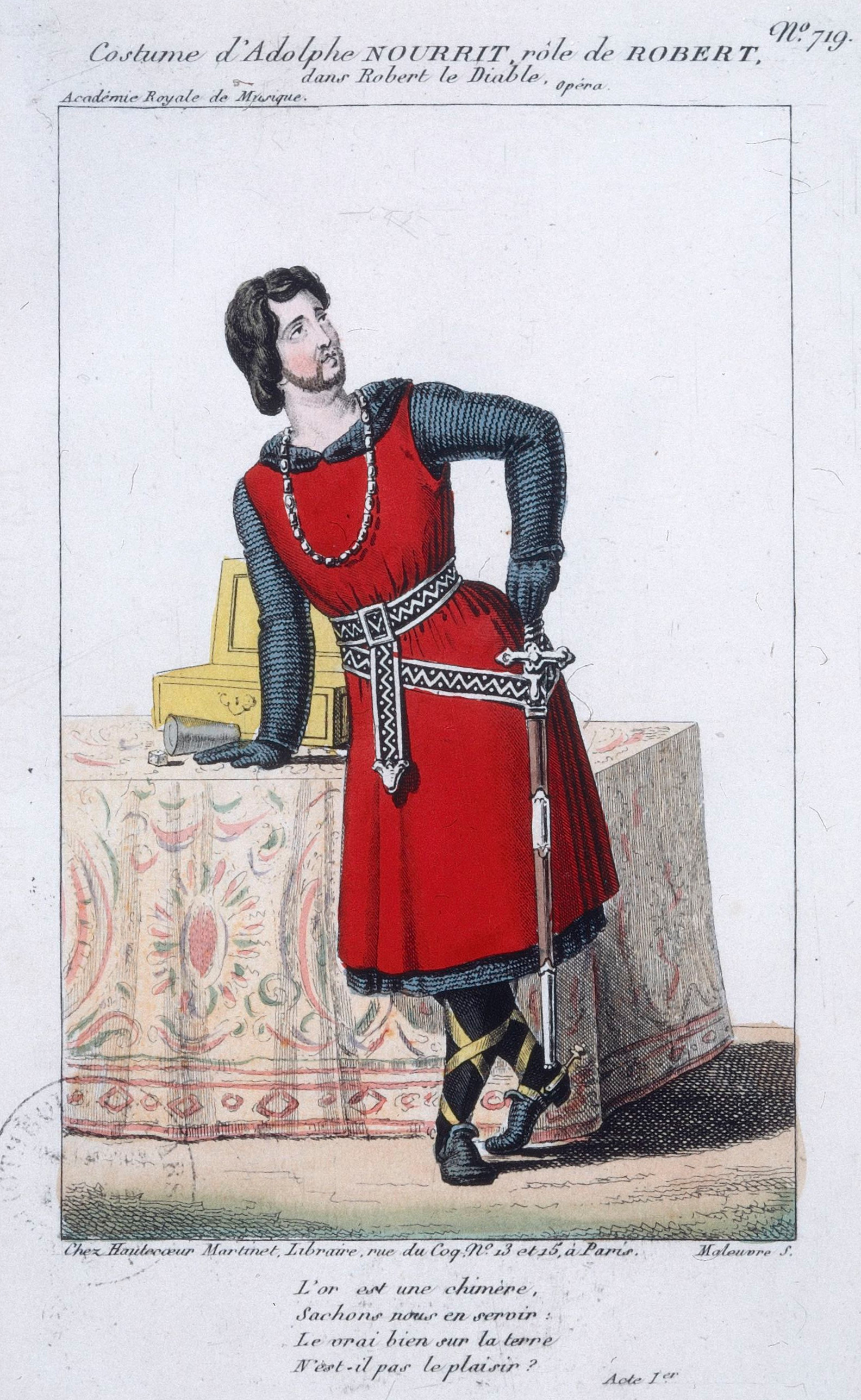
Nourrit as Robert

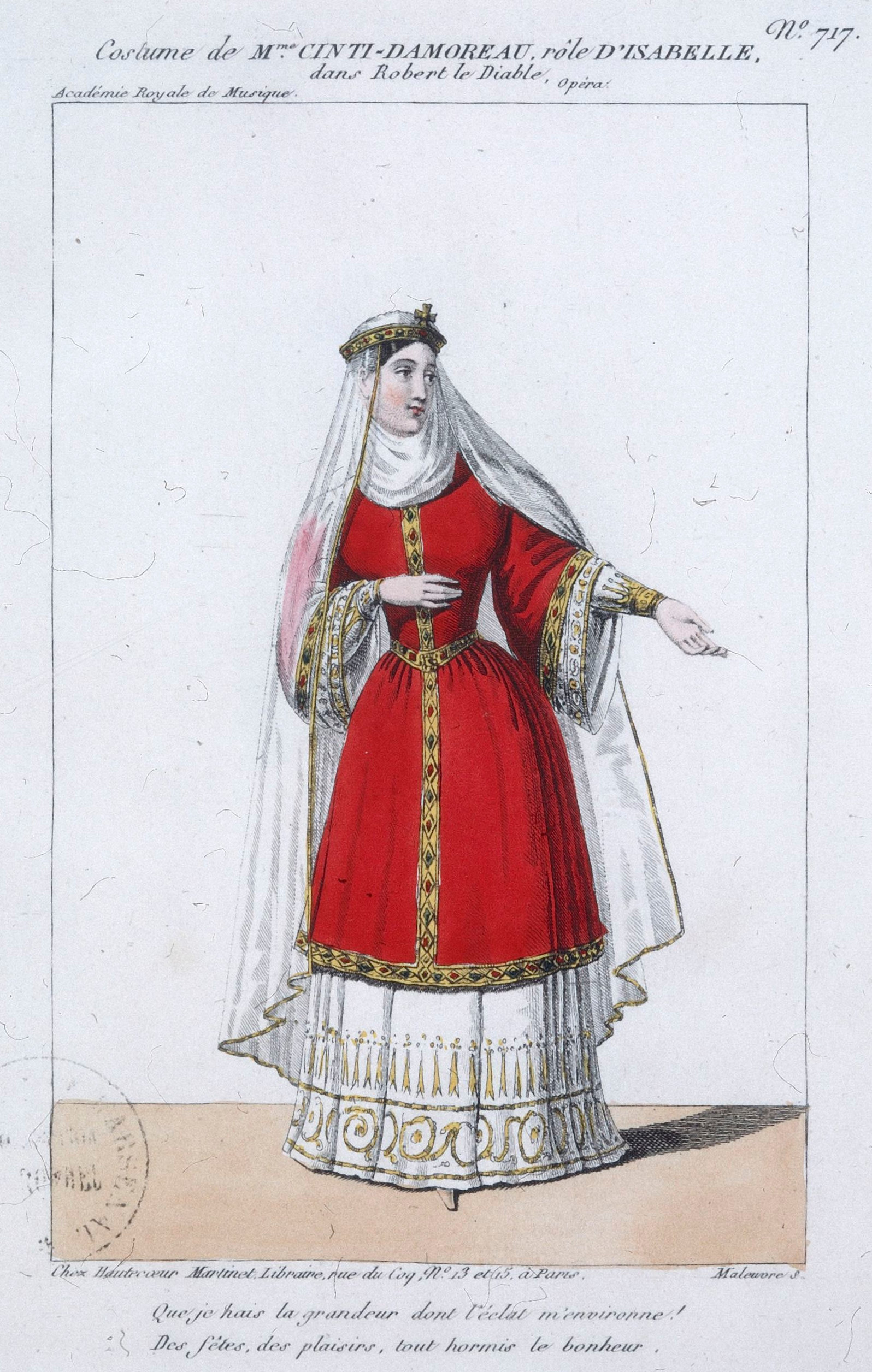
Cinti-Damoreau as Isabelle

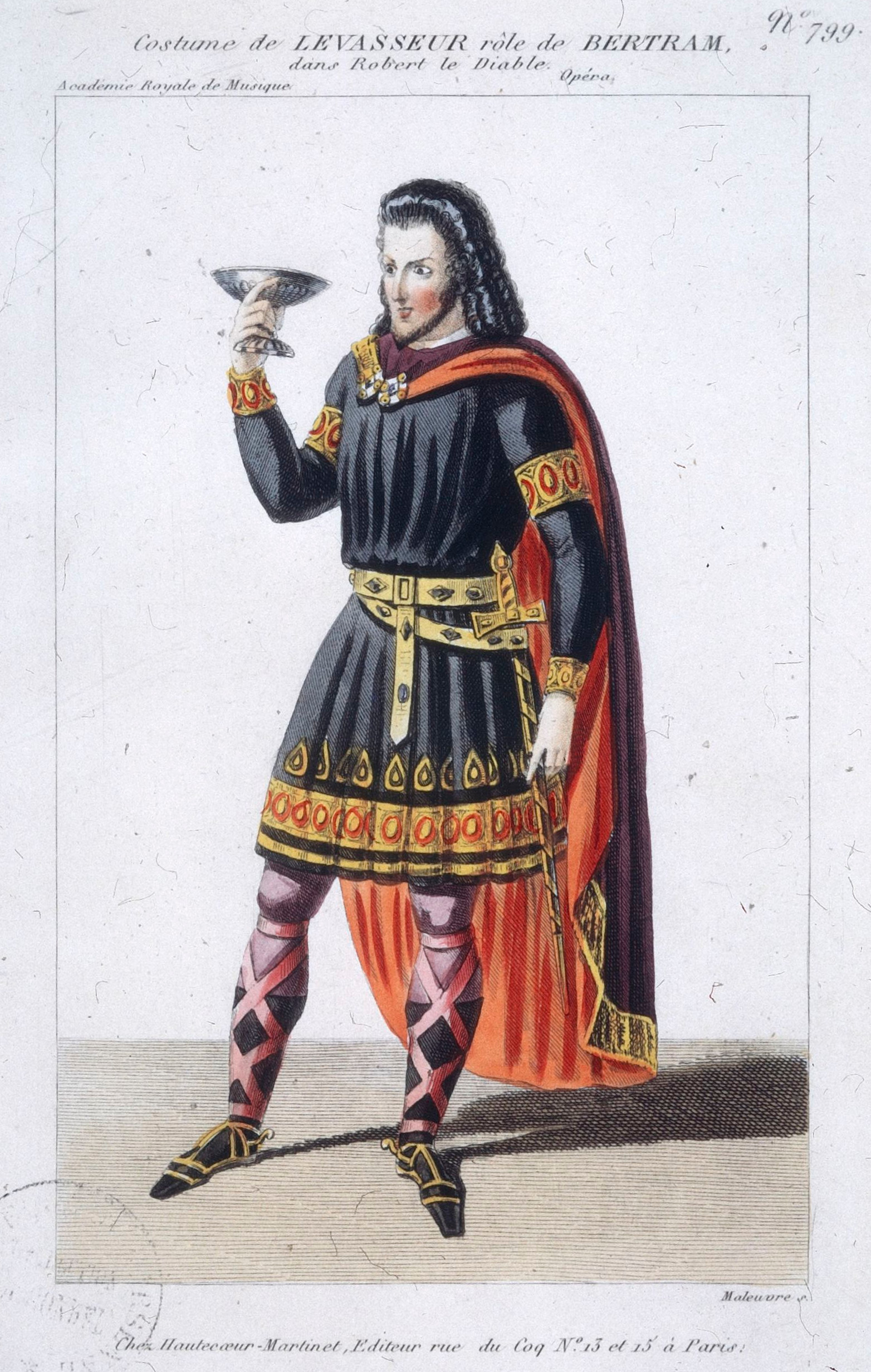
Levasseur as Bertram

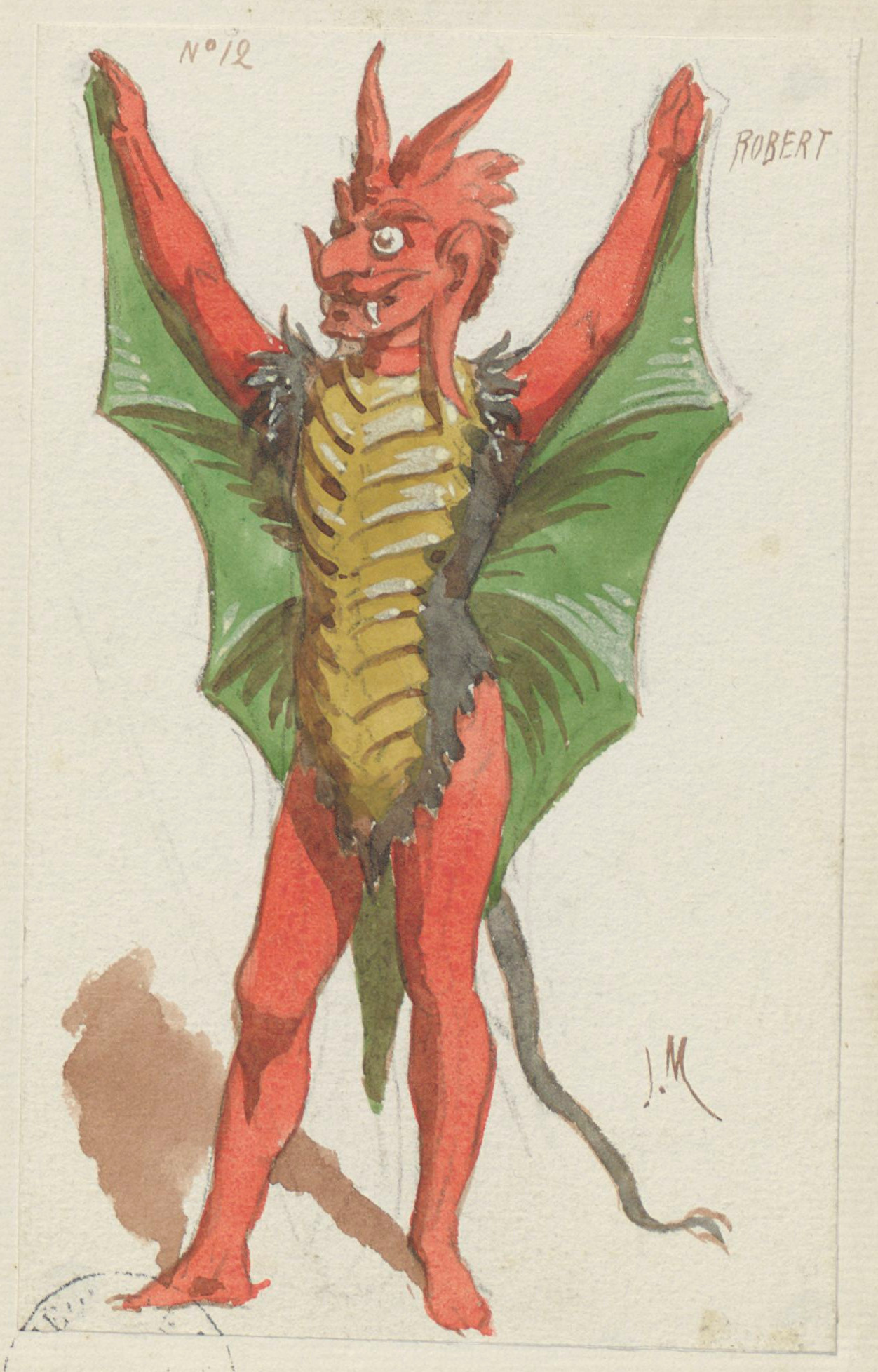
Costume for a devil

== Reception ==
A number of factors influenced the opera's very favourable reception. The initial cast contained leading singers of the period and, as it changed, equally brilliant stars (e.g. Falcon) were introduced as replacements. The sensational plot and the notoriety of the Nuns' ballet ensured that the opera was a hot topic in journals and reviews. This was assisted by the marketing skills of the director Véron and the publisher Schlesinger. The scenery was of exceptional quality: "This was as much an opera to see as to hear, and it has been argued that the real hero behind Robert le diable was Cicéri, the designer." Meyerbeer was keen to keep influential persons on his side. For example, he sent free tickets for 'a good box' to Heinrich Heine. And of course the businessman Véron knew how to use (and pay) the claque and its leader Augustin Levasseur.

But undoubtedly the novelty and colour of the music of Meyerbeer deserves major credit. The alliance of his German musical training, along with his study of opera for many years in Italy, was highly attractive to a Parisian audience which 'asked only to be astonished and surprised.' The critic Ortigue wrote that Meyerbeer 'straight away [took] his position at the crossroads where Italian song and German orchestration have to meet.' Meyerbeer paid close attention to unusual combinations and textures and original orchestration, examples being the use of low brass and woodwind playing chromatic passages associated with Bertram; the use of a brass band and male choir to characterise the demons in Act 3; and so on. Hector Berlioz was particularly impressed; he wrote an entire article in the Revue et gazette musicale, entitled 'On the Orchestration of Robert le diable ', which concluded:

Robert le Diable provides the most astonishing example of the power of instrumentation when applied to dramatic music; ... a power of recent introduction which has achieved its fullest development in the hands of M. Meyerbeer; a conquest of modern art which even the Italians will have to acknowledge in order to prop up as best they can their miserable system which is collapsing in ruins.

The opera was perceived to have weaknesses of characterization. For example, Robert's dithering behaviour led to one comment that "what is least diabolical in Robert le diable is Robert himself." But the critic Fétis gave the consensus opinion: "Robert le diable is not only a masterpiece; it is also a remarkable work within the history of music ...[it] seems to me to unite all the qualities needed to establish a composer's reputation unshakeably."

The success of the opera led to Meyerbeer himself becoming a celebrity. King Frederick William III of Prussia, who attended the second performance of Robert, swiftly invited him to compose a German opera, and Meyerbeer was invited to stage Robert in Berlin. In January 1832 he was awarded membership of the Légion d'honneur. This success – coupled with Meyerbeer's known family wealth – inevitably also precipitated envy amongst his peers. Berlioz wrote "I can't forget that Meyerbeer was only able to persuade [the Opéra] to put on Robert le diable ... by paying the administration sixty thousand francs of his own money"; and Chopin lamented "Meyerbeer had to work for three years and pay his own expenses for his stay in Paris before Robert le diable could be staged ... Three years, that's a lot – it's too much."

== Influence ==
The success of Robert had profound consequences, for the institution of the Paris Opéra itself, for the music, staging and popularity of nineteenth century opera as a whole, and for ballet.

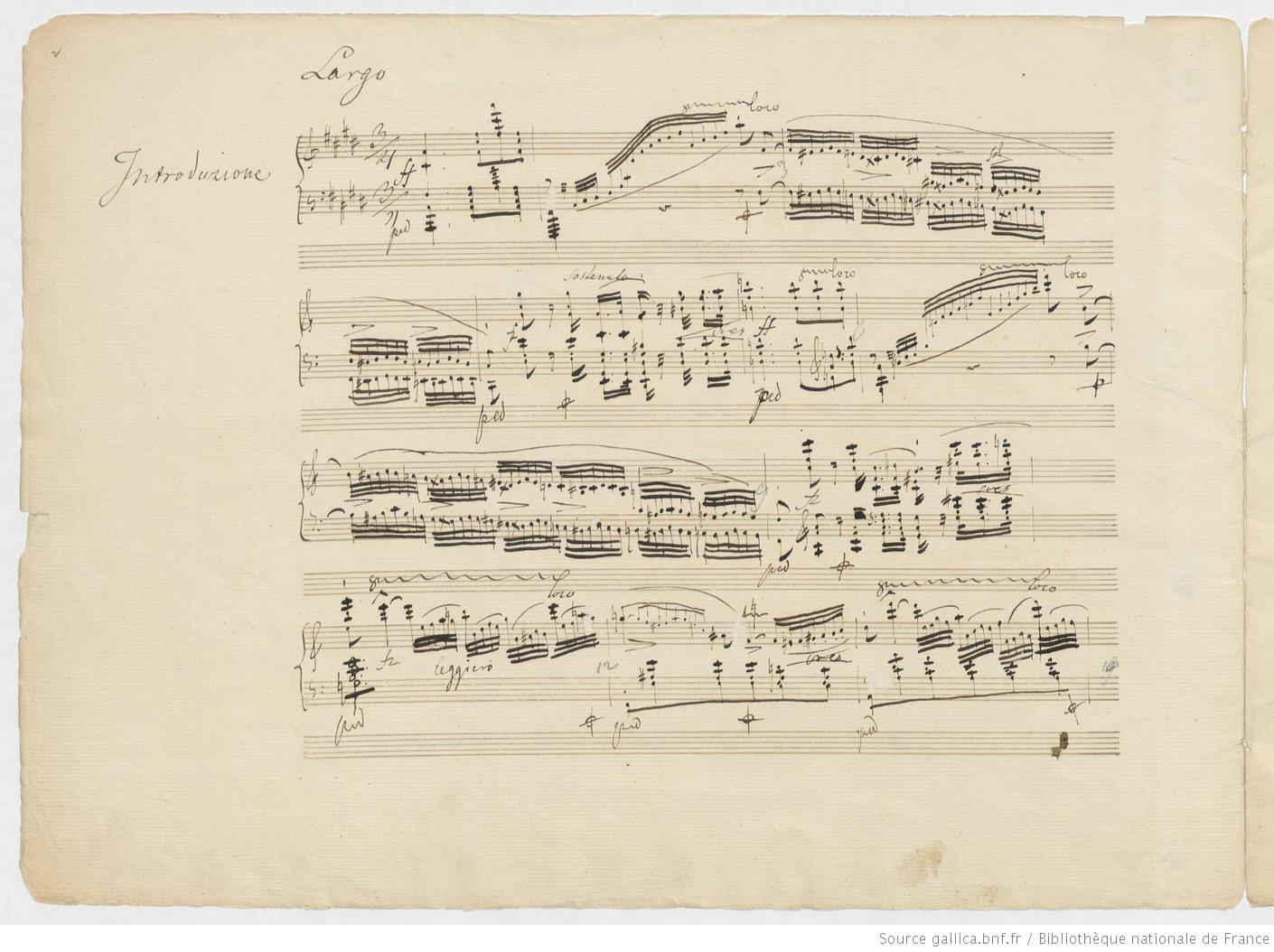
First page of manuscript of Grand duo concertant on themes of Robert by Chopin and Franchomme

The fortuitous timing of the opera's premiere, not long after the July Revolution, and its sensational and novel effects, meant that it was widely identified with the new, liberal, ideas of the July Monarchy. As Berlioz commented, Meyerbeer had "not only the luck to be talented, but the talent to be lucky." Honoré de Balzac (in his novella Gambara) and Heinrich Heine (in his poem Angélique) are just two of the contemporary writers to express their fascination with the opera. Alexandre Dumas set a chapter of The Count of Monte Cristo between two acts of Robert; and George Sand wrote about it at length in her Lettres d'un voyageur. It is the only nineteenth-century opera to have a rose named after it.

Also, the absence of starchy historical content in Robert doubtless played a part in attracting the bourgeoisie to the opera, until then regarded as primarily an aristocratic entertainment. The success of the opera also justified the government's policy of 'privatization' in selling the management to Véron, and this was a landmark in the dilution of state control and patronage in the fine arts. Although Véron had not commissioned it (having taken control only after the Revolution), Robert was his first new production as manager of the Opéra, and its success underwrote his policy of commissioning similar works. These were to include Meyerbeer's Les Huguenots, Fromental Halévy's La Juive, and Daniel Auber's Gustave III. However, while they used 'the same dazzling theatrical rhetoric' as Robert, they led to 'uniformly horrific dénouements' with 'gripping moral urgency', their more sophisticated plot-lines reflecting the changes in taste of the new opera clientele. They established Paris as Europe's opera capital, with the Opéra itself as its centre, in the period 1830 until 1850.

The Act 3 ballet is regarded by some as the first of the ballets blancs (whereby the principal ballerina and the corps de ballet are all clothed in white) which became a favourite of the nineteenth-century repertoire. Later examples include La Sylphide (1832) (also choreographed by Filippo Taglioni and danced by his daughter), Giselle (1841), Pas de Quatre (1845) and Les Sylphides (1909).

Music from the opera became the subject of numerous virtuoso works of the time. The brilliant transcription of its themes (Reminiscences de Robert le diable) made by the composer and virtuoso Franz Liszt was so popular that it became his calling card: on more than one occasion he was forced to interrupt his programmed concerts to play it because of the demands of the audience. On the day of its publication by Maurice Schlesinger, the edition of 500 was completely sold out and it had to be immediately reprinted. Indeed, the success of Robert, whose score was also published by Schlesinger, was said to have saved him from bankruptcy. Frédéric Chopin and Auguste Franchomme jointly composed a Grand duo concertant on themes from the opera, for cello and piano, in 1832, and the Italian pianist and composer Adolfo Fumagalli composed an elaborate fantasy on the opera for left hand alone as his Op. 106.

Other pieces based on the opera included works by Adolf von Henselt and Jean-Amédée Méreaux.

Edgar Degas painted the scene of the Nuns' ballet twice. The earlier version (1871) is in the Metropolitan Museum of Art, New York. In 1876 Degas painted a larger version for the singer Jean-Baptiste Faure (who had sung the part of Bertram); this version is in the Victoria and Albert Museum, London.

The work's popularity spawned many parodies and pastiches including one by W. S. Gilbert, Robert the Devil, which opened at the Gaiety Theatre, London in 1868. It is referenced in the opening scene of Andrew Lloyd Webber's The Phantom of the Opera, where one of the items being auctioned off is described as "Lot 664: a wooden pistol and three human skulls from the 1831 production of Robert le diable by Meyerbeer."

== Recordings ==
Year	Cast: Alice, Isabelle, Raimbaut, Robert, Bertram	Conductor, Opera House and Orchestra	Label
1968, May 7, sung in Italian	Stefania Malagù, Renata Scotto, Gianfranco Manganotti, Giorgio Merighi, Boris Christoff	Nino Sanzogno, Coro e Orchestra del Maggio Musicale Fiorentino	CD: Pantheon Music cat. XLNC 127; WorldCat
1985, July 2	Michèle Lagrange, June Anderson, Walter Donati, Alain Vanzo, Samuel Ramey	Thomas Fulton, Choeurs et Orchestre de l'Opéra National de Paris	CD: Adonis cat. 85003; OCLC 44115287
1985, filmed in Paris	Michèle Lagrange, June Anderson, Walter Donati, Rockwell Blake, Samuel Ramey	Thomas Fulton, Choeurs et Orchestre de l'Opéra National de Paris	DVD: Encore cat. DVD 2006; OCLC 62095709
1988, Feb. 21, live in New York	Frances Ginsberg, Marilyn Mims, Anthony Laciura, Chris Merritt, Samuel Ramey	Eve Queler, Opera Orchestra of New York. Carnegie Hall.	MP3: House of Opera cat. 7784
2000, March 14, live in Berlin	Marina Mescheriakova, Nelly Miricioiu, Stephan Rügamer, Jianyi Zhang, Kwangchul Youn	Marc Minkowski, Chorus and Orchestra of Staatsoper Unter den Linden	CD: House of Opera cat. CD 689
2000, live in Martina Franca	Annalisa Raspagliosi, Patrizia Ciofi, Alessandro Codeluppi, Warren Mok, Giorgio Surjan	Renato Palumbo, Bratislava Chamber Choir, Orchestra Internazionale d'Italia	CD: Dynamic cat. CDS 368/1-3
2001, March 11, live in Berlin	Brigitte Hahn, Nelly Miricioiu, Stephan Rügamer, Jianyi Zhang, Kwangchul Youn	Marc Minkowski, Chorus and Orchestra of Staatsoper Unter den Linden	CD: Richter Audio Encyclopedia cat. AE 006
2012, March 23	Carmen Giannattasio, Patrizia Ciofi, Martial Defontaine, Bryan Hymel, Alastair Miles	Daniel Oren, Coro del Teatro dell' Opera di Salerno, Orchestra Filarmonica Salernitana	CD: Brilliant Classics cat. 94604-3
2012, Dec. 6–15	Marina Poplavskaya, Patrizia Ciofi, Jean-François Borras, Bryan Hymel, John Relyea	Daniel Oren, Chorus and Orchestra of the Royal Opera House	DVD: Opus Arte cat. OA BD 7121 (Blu-ray), OA 1106 (NTSC DVD)
2019, April 5, live in Brussels	Yolanda Auyanet, Lisette Oropesa, Julien Dran, Dmitry Korchak, Nicolas Courjal	Evelino Pidò, unknown	CD: Euro Opera cat. EO 3713
2021, Sept. 20–27, live and studio	Amina Edris, Erin Morley, Nico Darmanin, John Osborn, Nicolas Courjal	Marc Minkowski, Choeur de l'Opéra National de Bordeaux, Orchestre National Bordeaux Aquitaine	CDs and book: Bru Zane cat. BZ 1049
