= François-Gabriel Lépaulle =

French painter

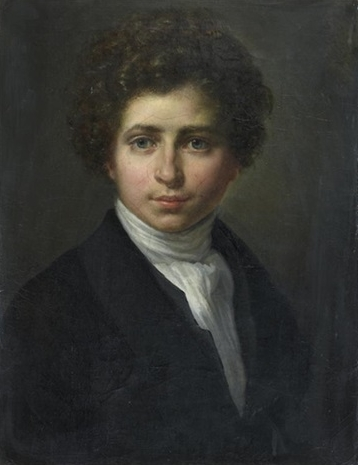
Self-portrait (c. 1825)

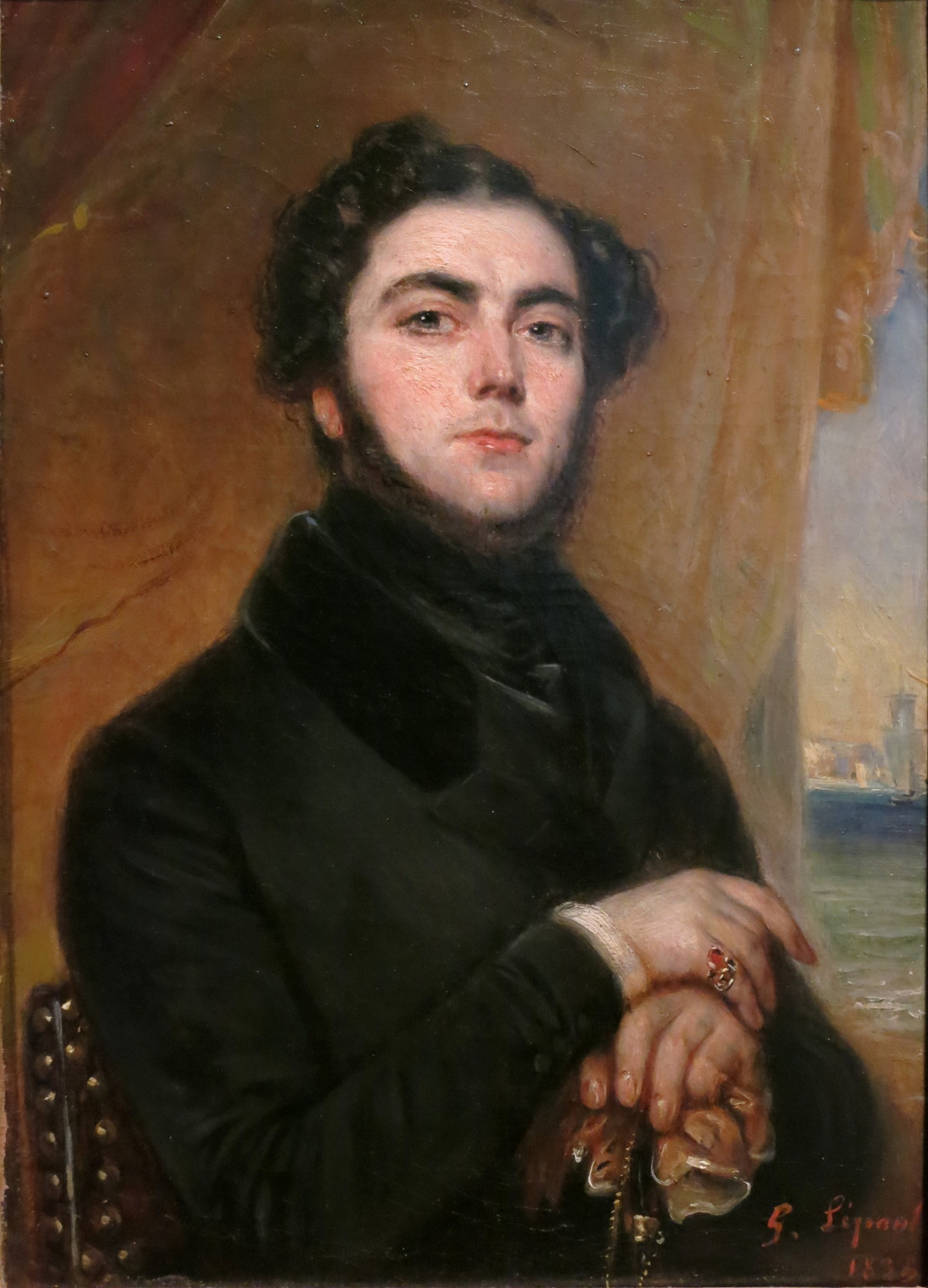
Portrait of Eugène Sue

Guillaume François-Gabriel Lépaulle (21 January 1804, Versailles – 28 August 1886, Aÿ) was a French painter associated with the Barbizon school. He painted landscapes historical works and genre scenes, although his best known works are portraits.

== Biography ==
He was a student of Jean-Baptiste Regnault, Horace Vernet and Jean-Victor Bertin at the École nationale supérieure des Beaux-Arts. His debut at the Paris came in 1824, with a scene depicting the invention of the lyre. Over the next few years, he became a regular annual contributor, with a profusion of subjects, based on his extensive travels to Spain, Italy, North Africa and Turkey. He also exhibited at the Exposition Universelle (1855)

Despite these scenes, ranging from the tragic to the picturesque, to the humorous, most were judged to have little merit. His high regard stems largely from his portraits, in the gallery at the Palace of Versailles, representing Napoléon III, Admiral Henri de Rigny, Anne-Charles Lebrun (Duc de Plaisance) and many other prominent figures.

He is also known for his decorative paintings at the churches of Saint-Merri and Saint-Vincent-de-Paul, as well as designing costumes for a performance of Robert le Diable, by Giacomo Meyerbeer, at the Paris Opera in 1835. The genre painter, Philipp Arons, is one of his more notable students.

His works may be seen at the Bibliothèque-musée de l'Opéra, Musée des Arts Décoratifs, Musée du Domaine départemental de Sceaux and Musée de l'Histoire de France

== Gallery ==
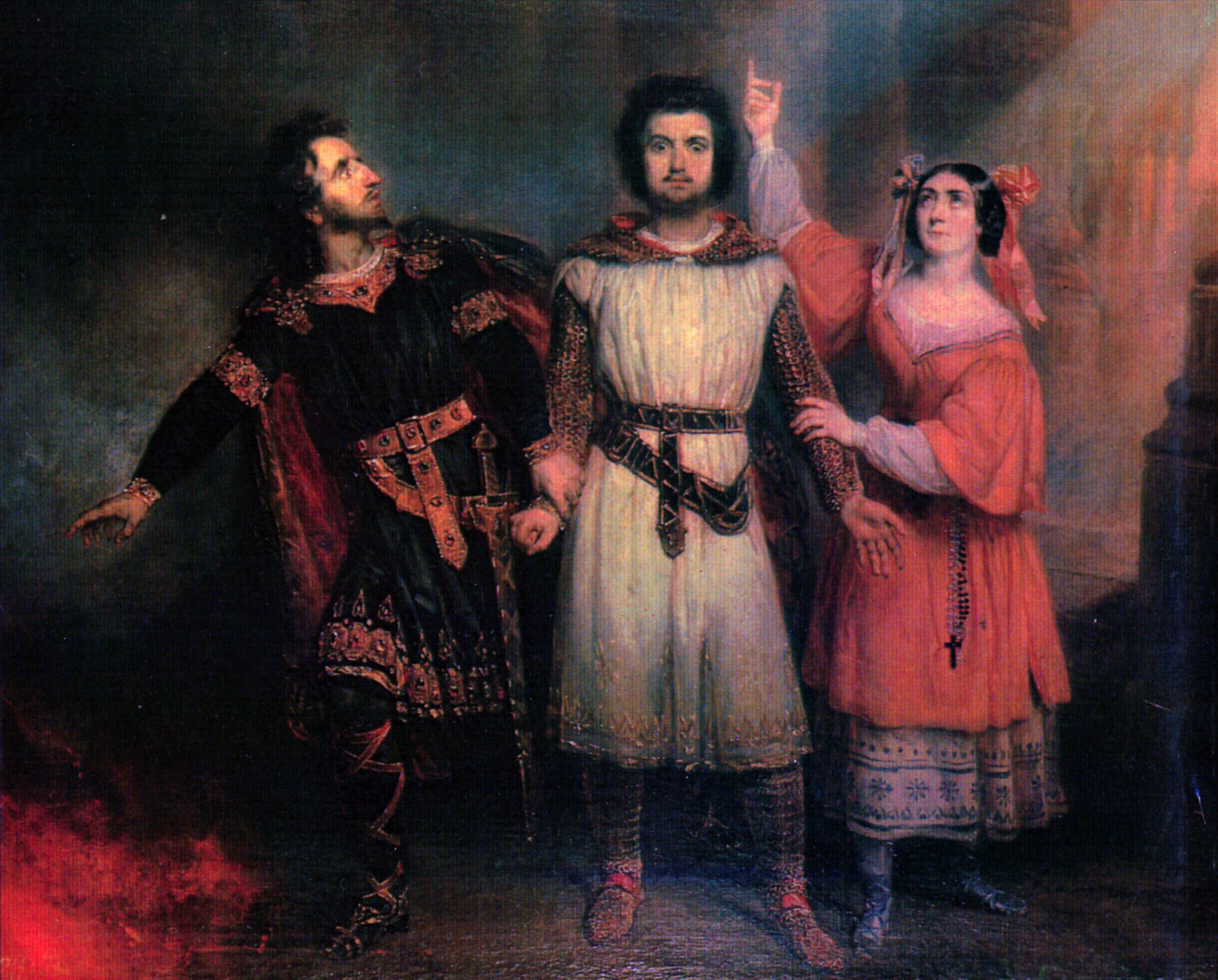
The trio in act 5 of Giacomo Meyerbeer's opera Robert le diable with (from left to right): Nicolas Levasseur as Bertram, Adolphe Nourrit as Robert, and Cornélie Falcon as Alice, 1835

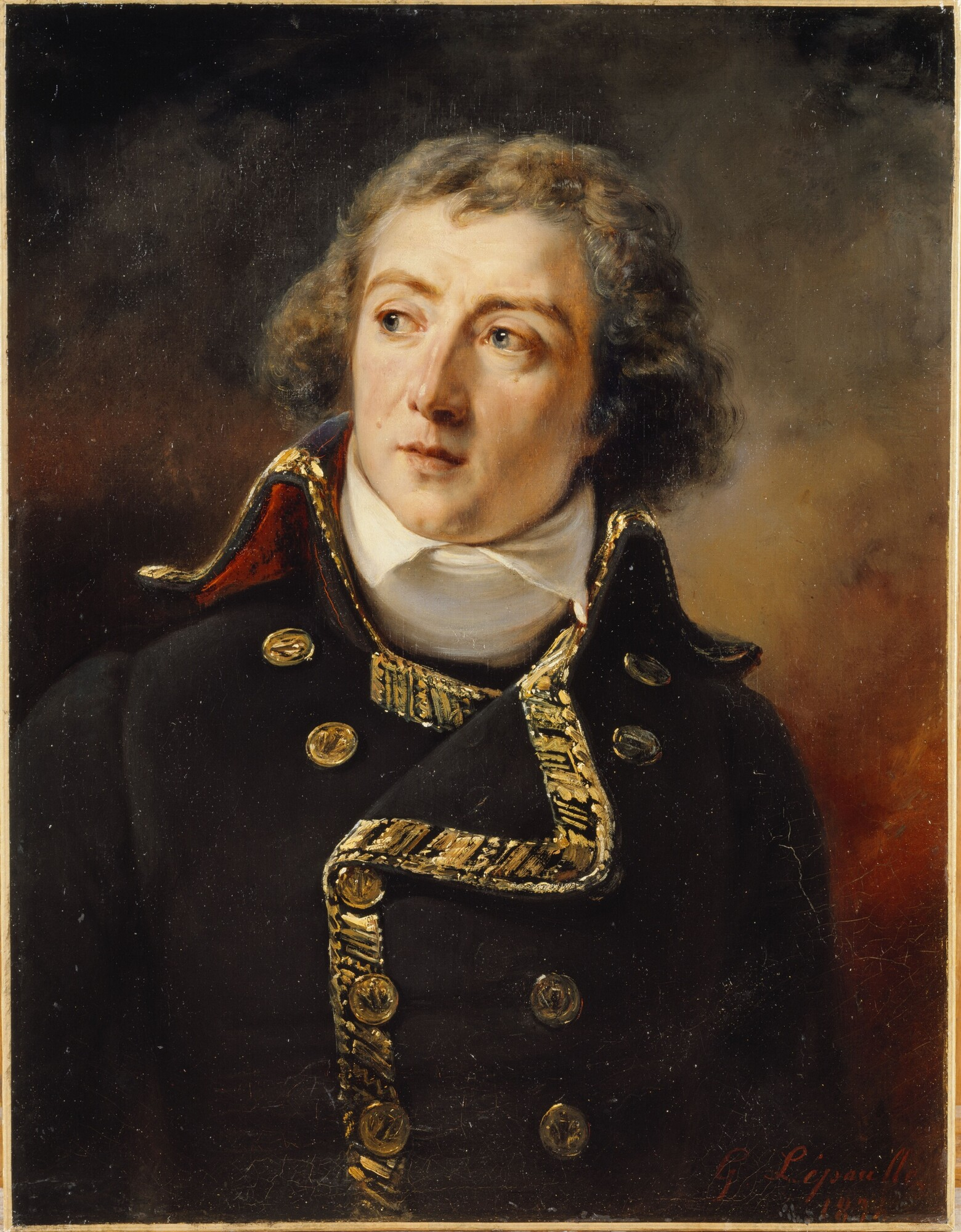
Louis-Alexandre Berthier, field marshal, chief of staff in 1792 (1753-1815), 1834

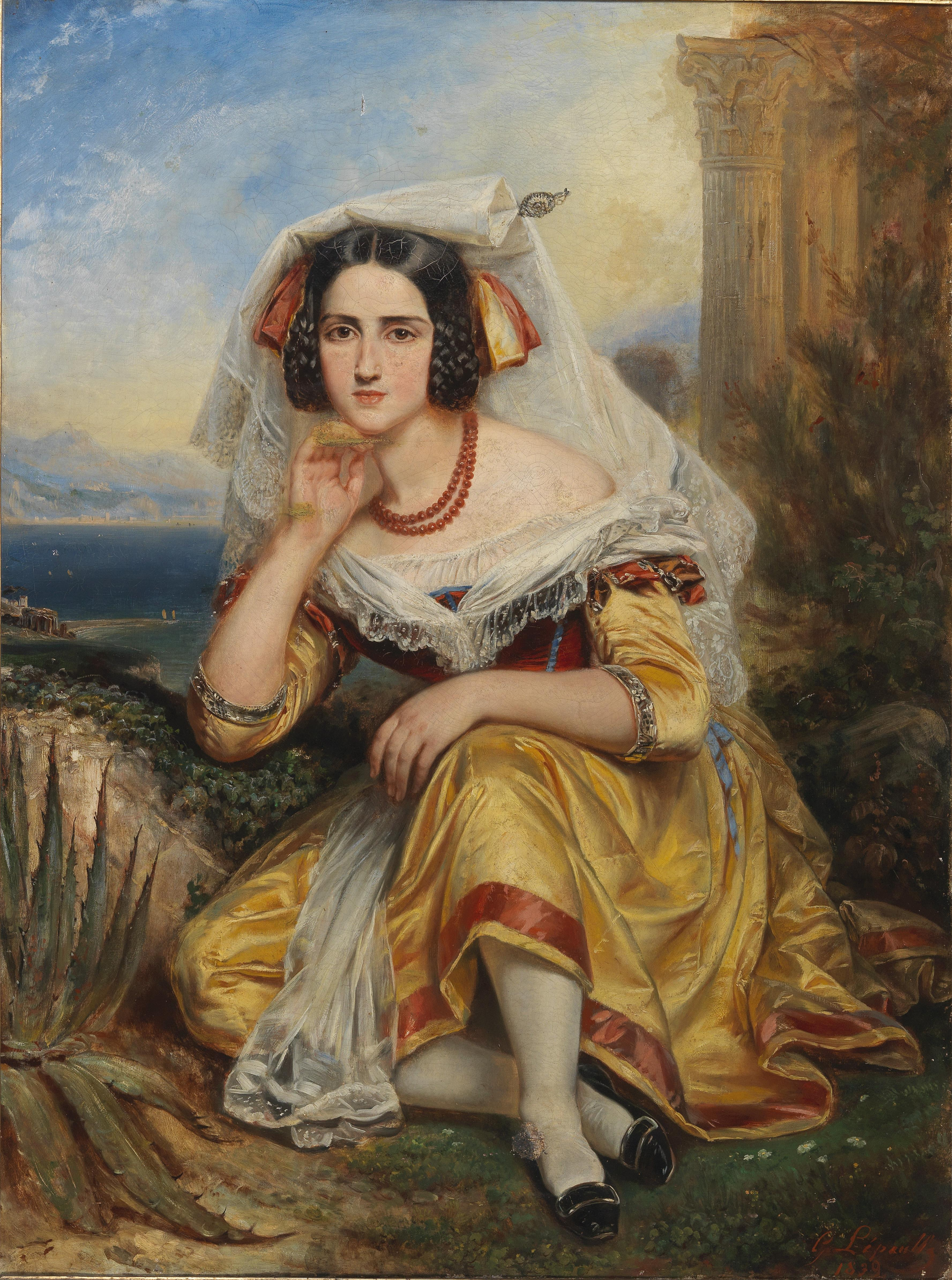
Girl from Frascati in festive costume, 1839

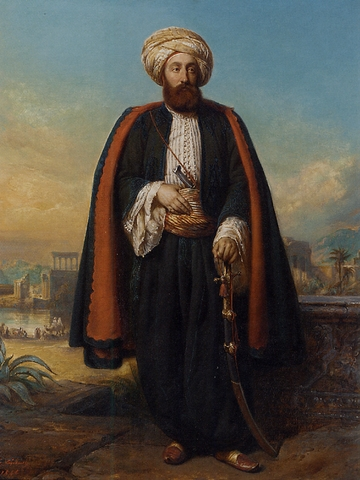
Colonel George Fergusson Henry, honorary Bey at the Sultan's court

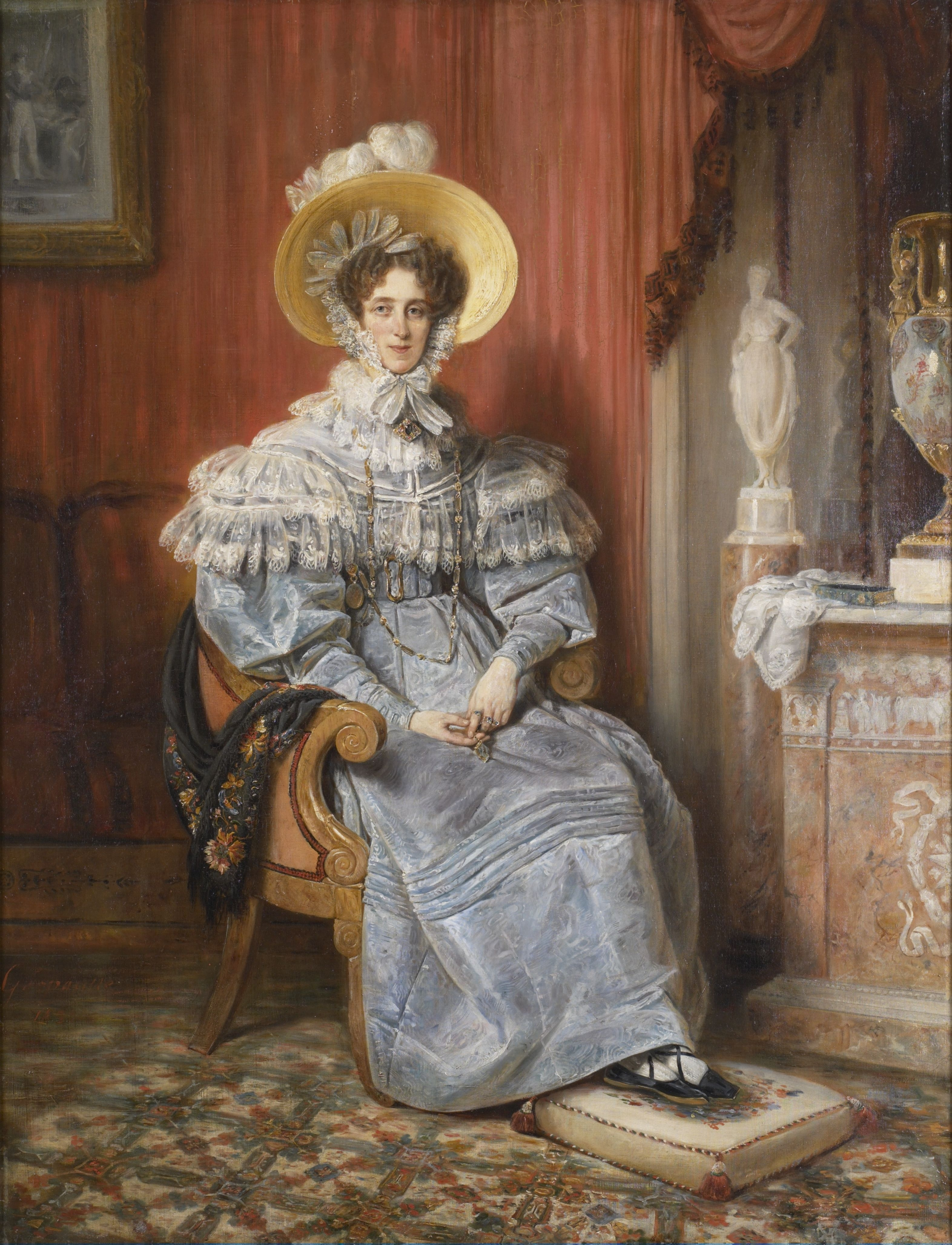
Princess Maria Elizabeth Amalie Franziska Wagram of Bavaria (1784–1849), Princess Wagram, 1832

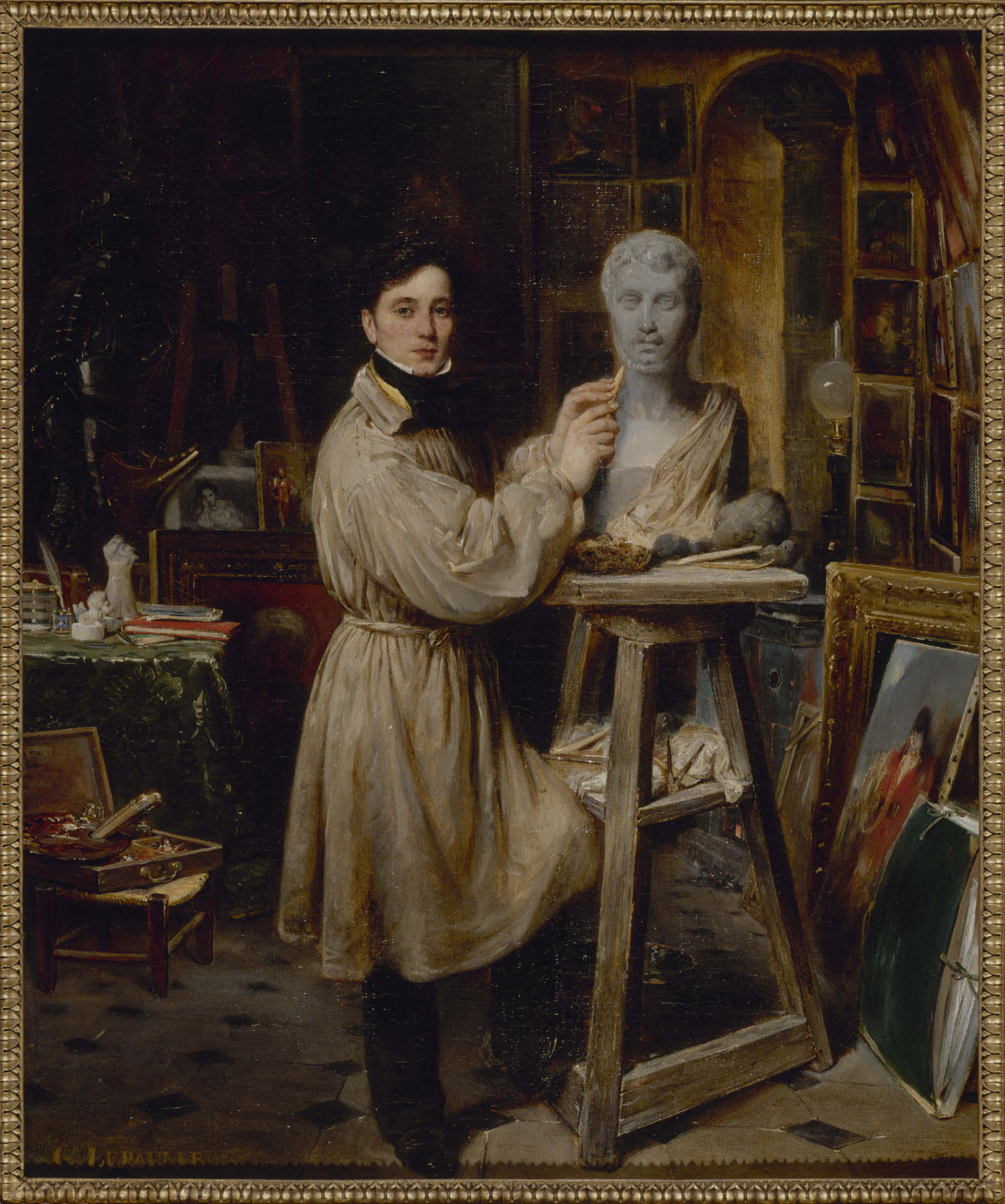
Jean-Pierre Dantan (1800-1869) modeling the bust of Lépaulle

== Sources ==
- Gustave Vapereau, Dictionnaire universel des contemporains, 5th ed., Paris, Hachette, pg. 1144 ISBN 978-2-01-917689-1
