= Louise Fitzjames =

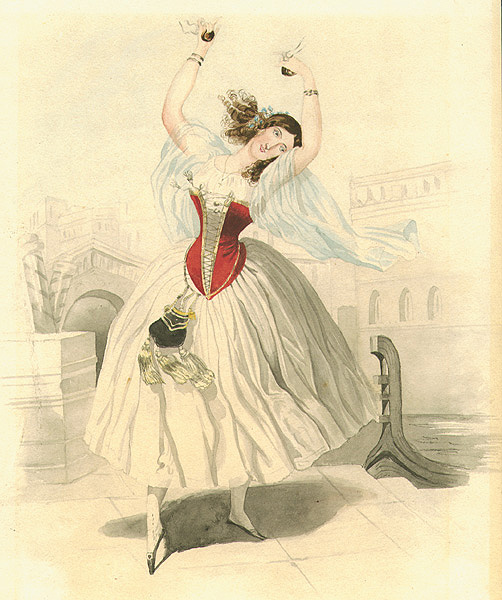
Fitzjames in One Hour, or The Carnival Ball

Louise Fitzjames was a 19th-century ballerina. She was born on 10 December 1809 in Paris, and danced at Paris Opera from 1832 to 1846. When Marie Taglioni dropped out of Meyerbeer's Robert le diable after a few appearances, Fitzjames took on Taglioni's role of the Abbess. She danced the Abbess over 230 times. She was criticized by poet Théophile Gautier for her emaciated appearance. Other roles included those in Le Dieu et la bayadere and La Jolie Fille de Gand in 1842.
