= Kwangchul Youn =

South Korean operatic bass (born 1966)

- Born: 1966 (age 59–60); Chungju, South Korea
- Education: Cheongju University; Hochschule der Künste Berlin
- Occupation: Operatic bass
- Organizations: Berlin State Opera; Seoul National University
- Title: Kammersänger

- Kwangchul Youn
- Hangul: 연광철
- Hanja: 延侊哲
- RR: Yeon Gwangcheol
- MR: Yŏn Kwangch'ŏl

Kwangchul Youn (born 1966) is a South Korean operatic bass and academic voice teacher. He made an international career based in Germany, from 1994 to 2004 at the Berlin State Opera. He has performed leading roles at international opera houses and festivals, such as Gurnemanz in Parsifal at the Bayreuth Festival, Mephisto in Faust at the Vienna State Opera, and King Marke in Tristan und Isolde at the Metropolitan Opera.

== Life and career ==
Youn was born in 1966 in Chungju to a family of farmers. He first trained to become an architect, but then turned to voice studies at Cheongju University at age 19.

In 1988, he made his debut at the Seoul State Opera as de Sirieux in Giordano's Fedora. He continued his studies from 1990 to 1991 at the Sofia Academy of Music with Lesa Koleva and from 1991 to 1993 at the Hochschule der Künste Berlin with Herbert Brauer. During this time, he received several awards at national and international competitions. He won the Operalia competition in Paris in 1993.

From 1993 to 1994, Youn appeared as Sarastro in Mozart's Die Zauberflöte and as the Commendatore in Don Giovanni at the Leipzig Opera. From 1994 to 2004, he was a member of the Berlin State Opera, where he appeared as the King in Aida, the Minister in Fidelio, King Marke in Tristan und Isolde, Bertram in Robert le diable, Colline in La bohème and Lodovico in Otello.

In 1996, he made his Bayreuth Festival debut as a night watchman in Die Meistersinger von Nürnberg. He appeared as the Landgrave in Tannhäuser in 2002, Titurel in Parsifal in 2004, King Marke in Tristan und Isolde in 2005, and Fasolt in Das Rheingold and Hunding in Die Walküre in 2006. In 2008, he performed as Gurnemanz in Parsifal for the first time, directed by Stefan Herheim. From 2014, he appeared as Daland in Der fliegende Holländer.

He appeared as Gurnemanz also at the Vienna State Opera, Teatro Real in Madrid, Bavarian State Opera, the Teatro Regio di Torino and the Lyric Opera in Chicago. Since 2007, he has been working with Oper Frankfurt, where he appeared as Philipp II in Verdi's Don Carlo. He has also performed at the Liceu in Barcelona and the Washington National Opera, among others. He appeared at the Vienna State Opera as Mephisto in Gounod's Faust, at the Metropolitan Opera in New York City as King Marke in Tristan und Isolde, and at the London Royal Opera House as the King in Wagner's Lohengrin in 2009.

Youn has appeared in concert at the Accademia Nazionale di Santa Cecilia in Rome as well as at the Wiener Musikverein, the Vienna Konzerthaus (e.g. in March 2010 in Gustav Mahler's Eighth Symphony) and at the Salzburg Easter Festival.

He has given recitals with his piano partner Helmut Oertel, such as in the summer of 2007 at the Margravial Opera House in Bayreuth and in the autumn of 2007 at the Oper Frankfurt. In December 2009, he sang Schubert's Winterreise with pianist Myung-Whun Chung at the Art Center in Seoul. He regularly sings the bass part in Beethoven's Symphony No. 9 at New Year's Eve concerts at the Konzerthaus in Berlin. He has worked with conductors such as Christian Thielemann, Mark Minkowski, Fabio Luisi, Michael Gielen, Myung-Whun Chung, Zubin Mehta, James Levine, Horst Stein and Thomas Hengelbrock in opera and concert as well as in CD productions.

He appeared in recordings of Le nozze di Figaro, Così fan tutte, Don Giovanni and d'Albert's Tiefland with conductor Bertrand de Billy. He recorded Meistersinger in Bayreuth conducted by Barenboim, and Keiser's Croesus conducted by René Jacobs. A recording of Daphne by Richard Strauss, conducted by Semjon Bychkov, was nominated for the Grammy Awards 2006 as best opera production.

From 2010 to 2017, Youn was a professor of the College of Music of the Seoul National University. He was awarded the title Kammersänger from the Berlin State Opera in 2018, the second singer from Asia to be so honoured.

== Repertoire ==
Youn's roles have included:

- Ludwig van Beethoven
  - Don Fernando and Rocco in Fidelio
- Vincenzo Bellini
  - Oroveso in Norma
- Hector Berlioz
  - Narbal in Les Troyens
- Claude Debussy
  - Arkel in Pelléas et Mélisande
- Gaetano Donizetti
  - Heinrich VIII in Anna Bolena
  - Dulcamara in L'elisir d'amore
  - Raimondo in Lucia di Lammermoor
  - Talbot in Maria Stuarda
- Paul Dukas
  - Barbe-bleue in Ariane et Barbe-bleue
- Umberto Giordano
  - M. de Siriex in Fedora
- Charles Gounod
  - Mephistopheles in Faust
- Giacomo Meyerbeer
  - Bertram in Robert le diable
- Wolfgang Amadeus Mozart
  - Figaro and Bartolo in Le nozze di Figaro
  - Don Giovanni, Il Commendatore and Leporello in Don Giovanni
  - Alfonso in Così fan tutte
  - Sarastro in Die Zauberflöte
- Giacomo Puccini
  - Colline in La bohème
- Gioachino Rossini
  - Basilio in Il barbiere di Siviglia
- Camille Saint-Saëns
  - An old Hebrew in Samson et Dalila
- Richard Strauss
  - Nazarener in Salome
- Pyotr Tchaikovsky
  - Gremin in Eugene Onegin
- Giuseppe Verdi
  - Attila in Attila
  - Ramphis and Il Re in Aida
  - Fillippo II and Großinquisitor in Don Carlos
  - Marchese von Calatrava and Guardiano in La forza del destino
  - Banquo in Macbeth
  - Sparafucile in Rigoletto
  - Fiesco in Simon Boccanegra
  - Ferrando in Il trovatore
  - Wurm in Luisa Miller
  - Loredano in I due Foscari
  - Lodovico in Otello
  - Messa da Requiem
- Richard Wagner
  - A night watchman and Veit Pogner in Die Meistersinger von Nürnberg
  - Gurnemanz and Titurel in Parsifal
  - Fasolt in Das Rheingold
  - Hunding in Die Walküre
  - König Marke in Tristan und Isolde
  - Hermann, Landgraf von Thüringen in Tannhäuser
  - Heinrich der Vogler in Lohengrin
  - Daland in Der fliegende Holländer

== Awards ==
- 2018: Berlin Kammersänger
- 2018: Ho-Am Prize in the Arts
