= Michèle Lagrange =

French operatic soprano

Michèle Lagrange (born 29 May 1947) is a contemporary French operatic soprano.

== Biography ==
Born in Couches (Burgundy), Lagrange studied at the Conservatoire de Paris (rue de Madrid) in 1972-74 and at the Opéra Studio from 1974 to 1977.

She began her career in the troupe of the Opéra de Lyon then, from 1984, was frequently invited to play at the Opéra de Paris.

Between 1978 and 1983 Lagrange performed the title role of Gounod's Mireille, Fiordiligi in Mozart's Cosi fan tutte, Agathe in Weber's Freischütz at the Opéra de Lyon. She began in 1972 at the Festival d'Aix-en-Provence in Rossini's Il turco in Italia, sang in Buenos Aires in Berlioz's Benvenuto Cellini and made her debut in 1984 at the Paris Opera in Verdi's Jérusalem.

She played the role of Elvira in Bellini's I puritani, Elisabeth in Verdi's Don Carlos, Manon in Puccini's Manon Lescaut, Alice in Meyerbeer's Robert le diable, Norma in Bellini's Norma, Imogène in Il pirata by Bellini, Esclarmonde in Massenet's Esclarmonde, Donna Anna in Mozart's Don Giovanni, Julie in Spontini's La vestale. She was a voice double in the vocal parts played by Teri Polo in the film "Phantom of the opera" directed by Tony Richardson, 1990.

== Discography ==
- Magnard's Guercœur with the Orchestre du Capitole de Toulouse conducted by Michel Plasson, 1986 EMI (as Beauté)
- Poulenc's Stabat Mater with the Orchestre national de Lyon conducted by Serge Baudo Harmonia Mundi
- Prokofiev's The Love for Three Oranges with the Opéra de Lyon orchestra conducted by Kent Nagano, 1989, Virgin Classics (as Fata Morgana)
- Meyerbeer's Robert le Diable with the Palais Garnier orchestra under the baton of Thomas Fulton, 1985 (as Alice)
