= Ballet blanc =

Ballet scene in which all female dancers wear white dresses

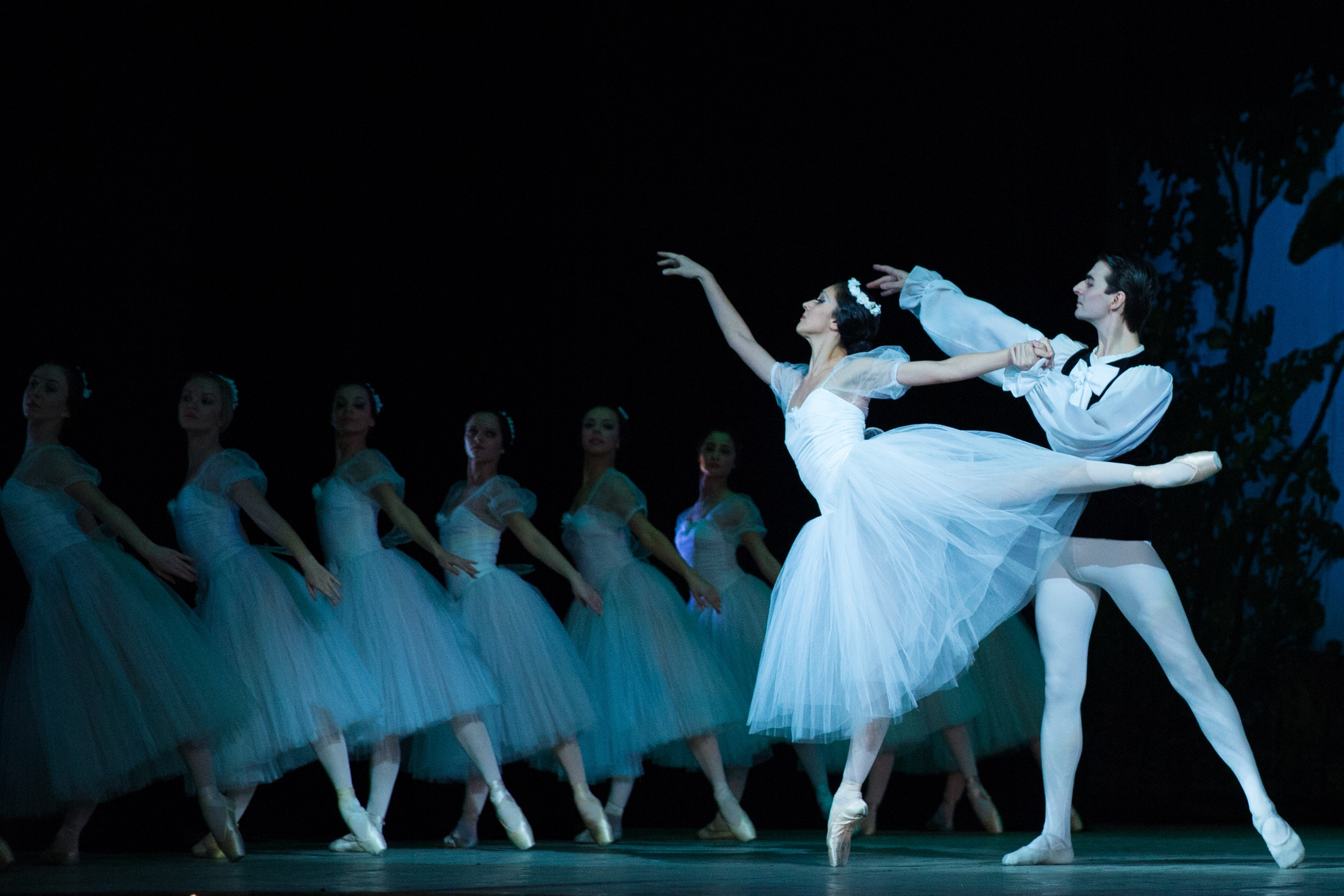
Scene from Les Sylphides

A ballet blanc (French: [balɛ blɑ̃], from French: 'white ballet') is a scene in which the ballerina and the female corps de ballet all wear white dresses or tutus. Typical in the Romantic style of ballet from the nineteenth century, ballets blancs are usually populated by ghosts, dryads, naiads, enchanted maidens, fairies, and other supernatural creatures and spirits.

== History ==
A precursor of the genre was Ballet of the Nuns, an episode in act 3 of Giacomo Meyerbeer's opera Robert le Diable. The ghosts of cloistered nuns who, in life, were unfaithful to their vows are summoned from their graves to tempt the hero, Robert, with dancing, gambling, drink, and love making. Choreographed by Filippo Taglioni and first presented in Paris in November 1831, it starred his daughter, Marie Taglioni as Helena, the abbess of the ruined convent of Saint Rosalia. Costumes in modern productions are usually white dresses with black sashes and headpieces.

The next year, 1832, Marie Taglioni appeared in the title role of La Sylphide, the story of a wood nymph (a sylphide) who tempts a Scottish farmer, James, to abandon his rural sweetheart and follow her into the woods, in pursuit of ethereal beauty. Dance historians consider this work, as the first fully-fledged ballet blanc, to be the beginning of the Romantic movement in ballet.

The name of the genre is derived from the white costume designed by Eugène Lami for Taglioni, which became the recognized dress for dancers of the academic school. The skirt of the Romantic tutu is either mid-calf or ankle length in design. Despite the introduction of Romantic elements of otherworldly spirits, the dancing in La Sylphide was of the purely classical school.

Ghosts, shades, shadows, spirits, and other elemental beings dominated ballet stages for decades after La Sylphide. Famous ballets blancs were staged in act 2 of Giselle (1842), in acts 2 and 4 of Swan Lake (1877/1895), in act 3 of La Bayadère (1877), and in act 1 of The Nutcracker (1892).

In modern productions, dancers in the lakeside scenes of Swan Lake and the Kingdom of the Shades scene of La Bayadère sometimes wear short, classical tutus rather than the traditional calf-length or ankle-length ballet dresses, but the visually stunning effect of the ballet blanc is undiminished. In 1908, Michel Fokine revived the genre in a ballet set to the music of Frédéric Chopin that he entitled Chopiniana. When a revised version was presented in Paris in 1909 by the Ballets Russes of Sergei Diaghilev, it was given the more Romantic title of Les Sylphides. It has remained a popular staple of the ballet repertory for the past century and more.
