= Les Sylphides =

Ballet by Alexander Glazunov

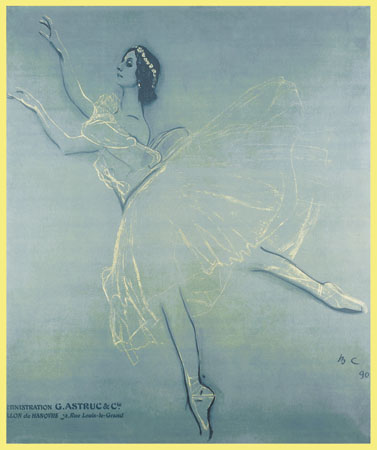
- Anna Pavlova in Les Sylphides, 1909
- Choreographer: Mikhail Fokine
- Music: Frédéric Chopin, Alexander Glazunov
- Based on: Chopiniana
- Premiere: (as Chopiniana): 1907, Mariinsky Theatre, Saint Petersburg, Russia (as Les Sylphides): 2 June 1909, Théâtre du Châtelet, Paris
- Original ballet company: Ballets Russes
- Characters: the poet, sylphs
- Design: Alexandre Benois (set); Léon Bakst (costumes)
- Created for: Tamara Karsavina, Vaslav Nijinsky, Anna Pavlova, and Alexandra Baldina
- Genre: Ballet blanc
- Type: Romantic reverie

Les Sylphides (French: [le silfid]) is a short, non-narrative ballet blanc to piano music by Frédéric Chopin, selected and orchestrated by Alexander Glazunov.

The ballet, described as a "romantic reverie", is frequently cited as the first ballet to be simply about mood and dance. Les Sylphides has no plot but instead consists of several white-clad sylphs dancing in the moonlight with the "poet" or "young man" dressed in white tights and a black tunic.

Its original choreography was by Michel Fokine, with Chopin's music orchestrated by Alexander Glazunov. Glazunov had already set some of the music in 1892 as a purely orchestral suite, under the title Chopiniana, Op. 46. In that form, it was introduced to the public in December 1893, conducted by Nikolai Rimsky-Korsakov. Subsequently, the choices of Chopin pieces and the orchestrations have been revised several times by a variety of composers.

== Performance history ==
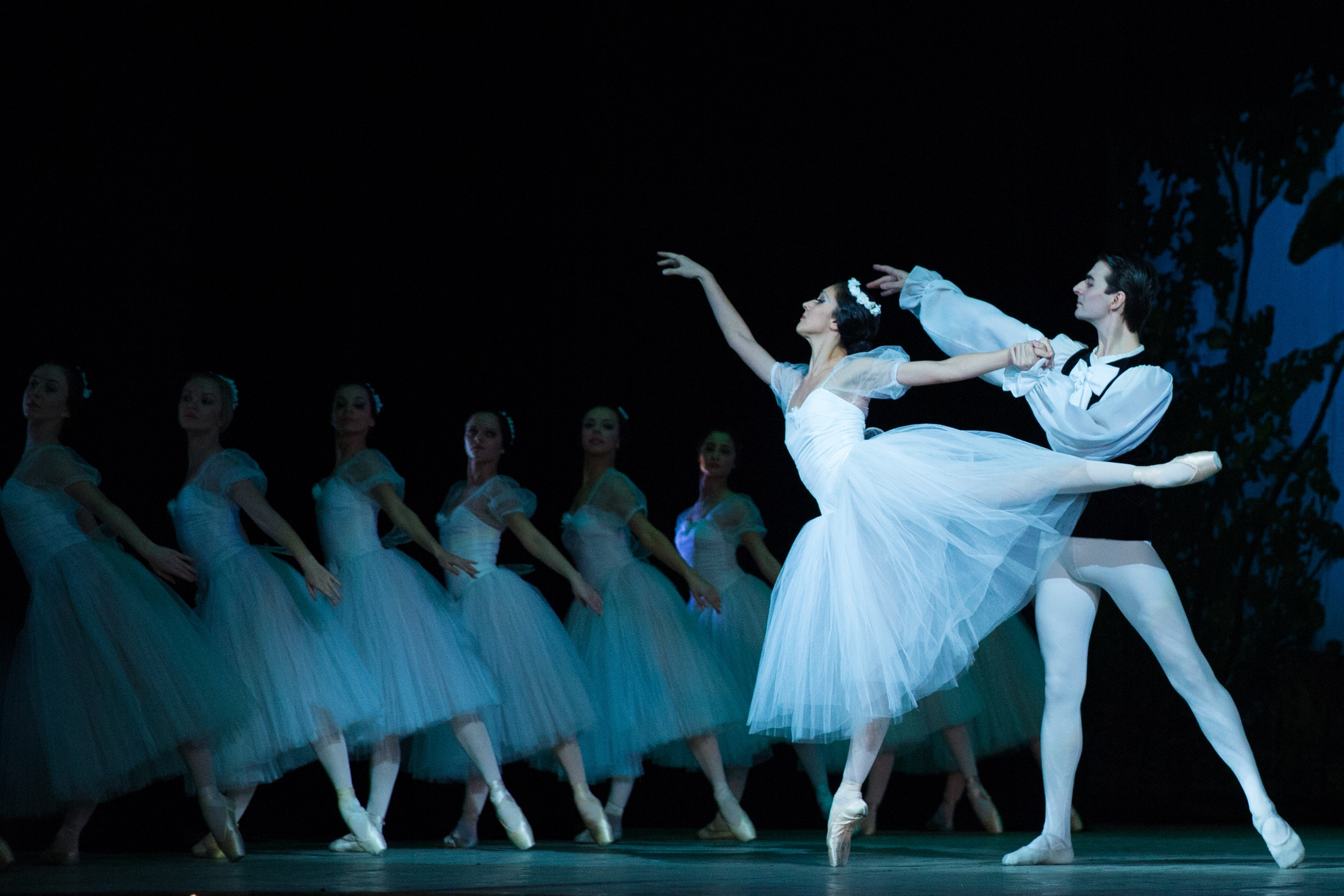
Scene from a performance in Baku, 2014

The exact origins of the ballet are complex. It evolved from a 1907 performance at the Mariinsky Theatre in Saint Petersburg titled Rêverie Romantique: Ballet sur la musique de Chopin. This early version served as the basis for the ballet Chopiniana, which underwent various revisions in Fokine's hands.

The work premiered as Les Sylphides on 2 June 1909, performed by Sergei Diaghilev's Ballets Russes at the Théâtre du Châtelet in Paris. The original cast featured Tamara Karsavina, Vaslav Nijinsky (as the poet, dreamer, or young man), Anna Pavlova, and Alexandra Baldina. Léon Bakst designed the long white tutu originally worn by Pavlova and subsequently adopted by the entire female corps de ballet. The long white tutu that Pavlova originally danced in, and that the entire female corps de ballet adopted soon after, was designed by Léon Bakst and inspired by lithographs of Marie Taglioni in the 1832 ballet La Sylphide.

The London premiere, in the first season of the Diaghilev Ballets Russes, was at the Royal Opera House. In North America, an unauthorized version premiered at the Winter Garden in New York on 14 June 1911. This production was staged by Gertrude Hoffmann and featured Lydia Lopokova and Alexandra Baldina (the latter being the only member from the original Diaghilev cast).

The authorized premiere on that continent, by the Diaghilev Ballets Russes, was at the Century Theater in New York City on 20 January 1916. It featured Lydia Lopokova (who had appeared in the unauthorised production five years earlier) in the leading role.

On 14 April 1916, Nijinsky danced the ballet with the company at the Metropolitan Opera, where it was paired with a similar work by Fokine, Papillons (set to a piano suite by Robert Schumann). Fokine went on to stage the ballet for several other companies, often performing the leading roles alongside his wife, Vera Fokina.

== Revision history ==
=== Original production ===
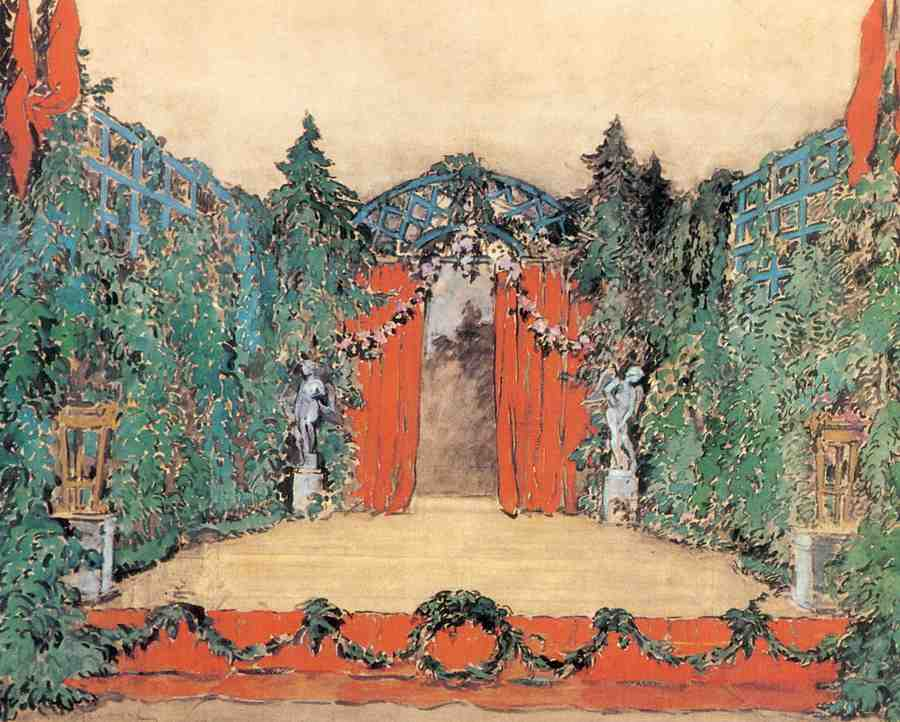
1909 set design by Alexandre Benois

Chopiniana, staged by Fokine, had a different musical composition. Also, Chopiniana was originally a compilation of dramatic or character dances set to Chopin's piano music. The Glazunov suite upon which this original version was based had only four Chopin pieces; Fokine wanted to use a waltz as an addition to the suite and was able to get Glazunov to orchestrate this to create his ballet, also called Chopiniana.

1. Polonaise in A major, Op. 40, No. 1
2. Nocturne in F major, Op. 15, No. 1
3. Mazurka in C♯ minor, Op. 50, No. 3
4. Waltz in C♯ minor, Op. 64, No. 2, as added by Michel Fokine
5. Tarantella in A♭ major, Op. 43

The newly orchestrated waltz would be Fokine's inspiration to re-choreograph the ballet into its nearly final form, selecting different Chopin pieces to go with it and getting these orchestrated by the Maryinsky répétiteur Maurice Keller.

=== Ballets Russes production ===
When Fokine's ballet premiered in Paris as part of Diaghilev's "Saison Russe" in 1909, Diaghilev commissioned re-orchestrations of all the dances, except for the Glazunov-orchestrated Waltz, by Anatoly Lyadov, Sergei Taneyev, Nikolai Tcherepnin and Igor Stravinsky. This version, now titled Les Sylphides, was first staged at the Théâtre du Châtelet on 2 June 1909.

=== Standard version ===
The canonical version of the ballet Les Sylphides includes:

1. Polonaise in A major (Military), Op. 40, No. 1 (some companies substitute the Prelude in A major, Op. 28, No. 7 instead)
2. Nocturne in A♭ major, Op. 32, No. 2
3. Waltz in G♭ major, Op. 70, No. 1
4. Mazurka in D major, Op. 33, No. 2
5. Mazurka in C major, Op. 67, No. 3
6. Prelude in A major, Op. 28, No. 7
7. Waltz in C♯ minor, Op. 64, No. 2
8. Grande valse brillante in E♭ major, Op. 18

=== New York City Ballet production ===
The New York City Ballet (NYCB) produced its own staging of the standard version, omitting the Polonaise in A major (and leaving the Prelude in A major in its original position), under the original title, Chopiniana. The NYCB premiere was staged by Alexandra Danilova and took place 20 January 1972, at the New York State Theater, Lincoln Center. The original cast included Karin von Aroldingen, Susan Hendl, Kay Mazzo, and Peter Martins.

== Other orchestrations ==
A number of musicians have orchestrated the Chopin pieces for major ballet companies, including Maurice Ravel, Benjamin Britten, Alexander Gretchaninov, Roy Douglas, and Gordon Jacob. The Ravel orchestration has been lost. The Britten orchestration was considered lost but a score thought to be his was found in 2013 in the archives of the American Ballet Theatre.

Roy Douglas's version has been recorded a number of times, and has largely supplanted the earlier versions. It was written in 1936, to replace what Douglas called "very bad orchestrations of Chopin's music".

== See also ==
- Classical music written in collaboration

== Sources ==
- Zank, Stephen (2005). Maurice Ravel: A Guide to Research. New York: Routledge. ISBN 978-0-8153-1618-3.
