= Echelon =

Echelon may refer to:

- A level formation
  - A level or rank in an organization, profession, or society
  - A military sub-subunit smaller than a company but larger than a platoon
  - Echelon formation, a step-like arrangement of units
- ECHELON, a worldwide electronic intelligence-gathering operation, within the UKUSA Agreement, mainly for industry espionage

== Places ==
- Echelon, New Jersey

== Sciences ==
- En echelon veins, geological feature
- Row echelon form, in mathematics, a kind of matrix

== Arts ==
- Echelon (band), a four-piece band hailing from Essex, England
- The Echelon, fanbase of the band Thirty Seconds to Mars, named after a song on their debut album.
- Echelons (album)

== Games ==
- Echelon (1987 video game), a space flight simulator by Access Software
- Echelon (2001 video game), a flight simulator game published by Buka Entertainment
- Echelon (board game), a 1989 quiz-based board game
- Echelon (warez), a game console warez organization

== Businesses ==
- Echelon Place, a former project by Boyd Gaming resort, unfinished site sold to Resorts World
- Echelon Mall, old name of Voorhees Town Center
- Echelon Corporation, a defunct American maker of control networks

== Other uses ==
- Echelon parking, a way of arranging parked cars
- Echelon pistol Springfield Armory Echelon, a 9mm pistol made by Springfield Armory, Inc.
