= The Chapman Family =

English indie rock band

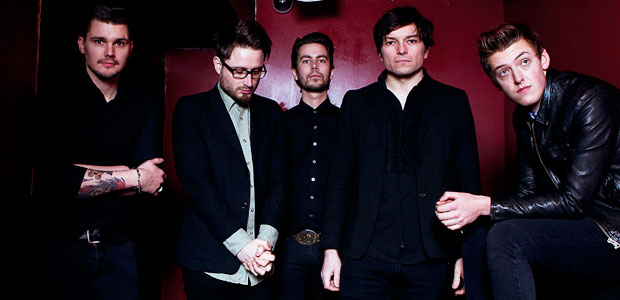
- The Chapman Family

Background information
- Origin: Stockton-on-Tees, England
- Genres: Post-punk revival, indie rock
- Years active: 2006-2013
- Labels: Best Before Records, PIAS Recordings
- Past members: Kingsley Chapman; Pop Chapman; Owen Chapman; Kevin James Chapman; Scott Chapman; Lucy Chapman; Paul Chapman; Phil Chapman
- Website: Band website

The Chapman Family were an English indie rock band from Stockton-on-Tees, that formed in 2006. The band's final lineup consisted of Kingsley Chapman (lead vocals, keyboards), Pop Chapman (lead guitar), Owen Chapman (rhythm guitar, backing vocals), Kevin James Chapman (bass guitar) and Scott Chapman (drums, backing vocals). The band's debut album Burn Your Town was released on 7 March 2011. They were notably part of the "10 Tips for 2009" shortlist published by NME.

== History ==
The band were formed in 2006 and played their first gig on 5 May of that year at KuBar in Stockton-on-Tees. Singer and guitarist Kingsley Chapman claims that they formed because they were "bored of watching bands who sounded f-k all like anything". The band originally consisted of Kingsley, Paul, Phil and Lucy, the latter was replaced by Pop in 2007.

The band released their first single, the double A-side "You Are Not Me" / "You Think You're Funny", on 8 October 2007 through local Stockton label Don't Tell Clare Records.

In 2008, the Chapman Family performed at the Glastonbury Festival, following a promotion on BBC Radio, 'In New Music We Trust'. They were chosen by a panel that included DJs Huw Stephens, Steve Lamacq, and Snow Patrol frontman Gary Lightbody. In 2008, the band were chosen as one of the closing bands for the Manchester In The City music conference, along with the Fratellis. They have played shows with the likes of We Are Scientists, 80s Matchbox B-Line Disaster and Future of the Left. They recorded a session for BBC Radio 1 at Maida Vale studios in London which was aired in September 2008.

In April–May 2009, the Chapman Family played alongside La Roux, Heartbreak and Magistrates on NME''s Samsung Radar tour, playing in Nottingham, Bristol, Wrexham, Oxford, Cardiff, Manchester, Leeds, Preston, Glasgow, Birmingham, Portsmouth, Stoke, Norwich and London.

The Chapman Family's second single, "Kids", was released on 27 April 2009, and accompanied by a promo video from director Blake Claridge. In September 2009 they announced the release of "Virgins", and their first full headlining UK tour.

In November 2009, the band featured in The Guardian's "New Band of the Day" series, where Paul Lester wrote "these noisniks just sound like tepid punk and kiddie goth."

In March 2010, the band played alongside Everything Everything and the Drums as part of the NME Showcase at the annual South by Southwest in Austin, Texas.

In October 2010, they released their fourth single, "All Fall". Following this they released their debut album Burn Your Town on 7 March 2011. Critics claimed this was a late release for the band, consequently due to the amount of hype they had created the years previously. Nevertheless, Burn Your Town was still sighted as a top album of 2011, with critical acclaim from the likes of NME, Artrocker and the BBC. The release of their fifth single "Anxiety" in January 2011 saw the accompanying video (directed by Tim Mattia) gather a nomination for Best Video of the Year at the Artrocker Awards 2011.

Following the departure of Phil (drums) and Paul (guitar) in the summer of 2011, new members were established. Pop (former bassist of the band) moved to play lead guitar, while newcomer Kevin stepped in to take up Pop's old role. Scott joined the group to take over from Phil on drums and percussion, while Owen (a long time friend and ex-tour bus driver to the band) also joined to accompany Pop on guitar. Due to this dramatic change-around, some have reported that the band's sound has changed slightly, from the old raucous cacophony of noise to a more shoegazing style of playing, with even more effects pedals and a chromatic/aleatoric sound. Bands they have recently been compared to are the likes of the Jesus and Mary Chain, the Cure, Interpol and Joy Division.

The newly formed line-up released their first collective record Cruel Britannia through the London independent label Best Before Records on 18 June 2012; the band's variated sound has been compared to that of the Smiths and received highly rated reviews, with the likes of NME describing it as "angsty, cliché-free brilliance."

In July 2013 following the announcement of their split, the Chapman Family played their final, farewell gig at The Georgian Theatre in Stockton. The band also decided to release their last single, "We Stick Together" via Bandcamp the same day as a parting gift to fans.

In 2014, Kingsley Chapman formed a new band, Kingsley Chapman and the Murder. Their debut single "Lovers" was released in July 2015 on the Too Pure label. The single was championed by Steve Lamacq on BBC6 where it won Rebel Playlist and has also been played extensively on XFM and Amazing Radio.

In 2015, Kingsley was also reported to be the inspiration behind the main character in Guy Mankowski's novel How I Left The National Grid.

As of 2021, Kingsley Chapman is making music as the frontman of Benefits.

== Discography ==
=== Studio albums ===
- Burn Your Town (2011)

=== EPs ===
- Cruel Britannia (2012)

=== Singles ===
Year	Song	Peak positions	Album
Year	Song	UK	Album
2007	"You Are Not Me / You Think You're Funny"	–	
2009	"Kids"	–	
2009	"Virgins"	–	
2010	"All Fall"	–	Burn Your Town
2011	"Anxiety"	–	Burn Your Town
2012	"No More Tears"	–	
2013	"Adult"	–	
2013	"This One's for Love"	–	
2013	"We Stick Together"	–	
