= Giselle =

1841 ballet by Adolphe Adam

Giselle, or The Wilis
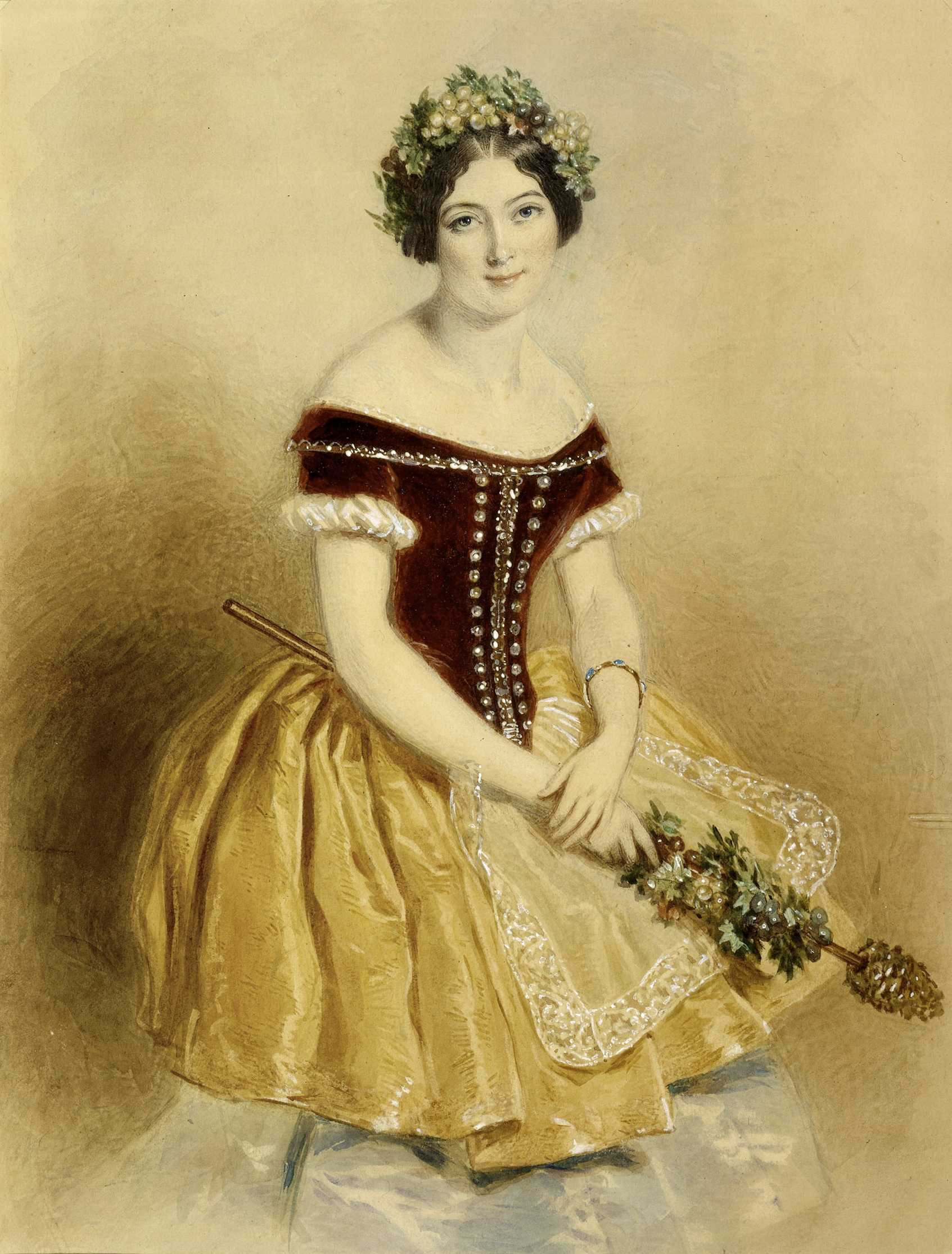
- Carlotta Grisi in the first act of Giselle (1842)
- Native title: Giselle, ou les Wilis
- Choreographer: Jean Coralli; Jules Perrot
- Music: Adolphe Adam
- Libretto: Jules-Henri Vernoy de Saint-Georges; Théophile Gautier
- Based on: Heinrich Heine's De l'Allemagne; Victor Hugo's "Fantômes" from Les Orientales
- Premiere: 28 June 1841; Paris, France
- Original ballet company: Ballet du Théâtre de l'Académie Royale de Musique
- Characters: Giselle, a peasant girl; Albrecht, Duke of Silesia; Hilarion, a gamekeeper; Berthe, Giselle's mother; Bathilde, a princess; Myrtha, Queen of the Wilis
- Setting: Rhineland during the Middle Ages
- Created for: Carlotta Grisi
- Genre: Romantic ballet

Giselle (/dʒɪˈzɛl/ jiz-EL, French: [ʒizɛl]), originally titled Giselle, ou les Wilis (French: [ʒizɛl u le vili]; Giselle, or The Wilis), is a romantic ballet (ballet-pantomime) in two acts with music by Adolphe Adam. Considered a masterwork in the classical ballet performance canon, it was first performed by the Ballet du Théâtre de l'Académie Royale de Musique at the Salle Le Peletier in Paris on 28 June 1841, with Italian ballerina Carlotta Grisi as Giselle. It became hugely popular and was subsequently staged across Europe, Russia and the United States.

The ghost-filled ballet tells the tragic, romantic story of a beautiful young peasant girl named Giselle and a disguised nobleman named Albrecht, who fall in love, but when his true identity is revealed by his rival, Hilarion, Giselle goes mad and dies of heartbreak. After her death, she is summoned from her grave into the vengeful, deadly sisterhood of the Wilis, the ghosts of unmarried women who died after being betrayed by their lovers and take revenge in the night by dancing men to death by exhaustion (a popular theme in Romantic-era ballets). Led by Myrtha, the Queen of the Wilis, they target Albrecht when he comes to mourn at Giselle's grave, but her great love frees him from their grasp. They gain their power in numbers as they effortlessly move through dramatic patterns and synchronized movements and control the stage with their long tulle dresses and stoic expressions, creating an ethereal atmosphere that builds as they gradually close in on Albrecht. By saving him from the Wilis, Giselle also saves herself from becoming one of them.

Librettists Jules-Henri Vernoy de Saint-Georges and Théophile Gautier took their inspiration for the plot from a prose passage about the Wilis in De l'Allemagne, by Heinrich Heine, and from a poem called "Fantômes" in Les Orientales by Victor Hugo.

Jean Coralli and Jules Perrot created the original choreography. The role of Giselle was created for Carlotta Grisi as her debut piece for the Paris public, and she was the only ballerina to dance it at the Paris Opera for many years. The traditional choreography that has been passed down to the present day derives primarily from the revivals staged by Marius Petipa during the late 19th and early 20th centuries for the Imperial Ballet in Saint Petersburg. One of the world's most-often performed classical ballets, it is also one of the most challenging to dance.

== Synopsis ==
=== Act I ===
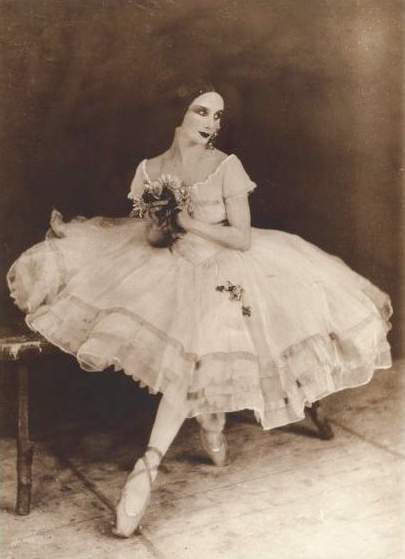
Anna Pavlova as Giselle (before 1931)

The ballet opens on a sunny autumnal morning in the Rhineland during the Middle Ages. The grape harvest is in progress. Duke Albrecht of Silesia, a young nobleman, has fallen in love with a shy, beautiful peasant girl named Giselle, despite being engaged to Bathilde, the Duke of Courland's daughter. He disguises himself as a humble villager called "Loys" to court the enchanting and innocent Giselle, who knows nothing of his true identity. With the help of his squire, he hides his fine attire, hunting horn, and sword before coaxing her out of her house to romance her as the harvest festivities begin.

Hilarion, a local gamekeeper, is also in love with Giselle and is highly suspicious of the newcomer who has won her affections. He tries to convince her that her beau can not be trusted, but she ignores his warnings. Her mother, Berthe, is very protective of her, as Giselle has a weak heart that leaves her in delicate health. She discourages a relationship between Giselle and Loys, thinking Hilarion would be a better match, and disapproves of her fondness for dancing, due to the strain on her heart.

A party of noblemen seeking refreshment following the rigors of the hunt arrive in the village with Bathilde among them. Albrecht hurries away, knowing he would be recognized and greeted by her, exposing him as a nobleman. The villagers welcome the party, offer them drinks, and perform several dances. Bathilde is charmed with Giselle's sweet and demure nature, not knowing of her relationship with Albrecht. Giselle is honored when Bathilde offers her a necklace as a gift before the group of nobles depart.

The villagers continue the harvest festivities, and Albrecht emerges again to dance with Giselle, who is named the Harvest Queen. Hilarion interrupts the festivities. He has discovered Albrecht's finely made sword and presents it as proof that he is really a nobleman who is engaged to another woman. Using Albrecht's hunting horn, Hilarion calls back the party of noblemen. Albrecht has no time to hide and has no choice but to greet Bathilde as his fiancée. All are shocked by the revelation, but none more than Giselle, who becomes inconsolable when faced with his deception. Knowing that they can never be together, she flies into a mad fit of grief in which all the tender moments she shared with Loys flash before her eyes. She begins to dance wildly and erratically, ultimately causing her weak heart to give out. She collapses and dies in Albrecht's arms. Hilarion and Albrecht turn on each other in rage before Albrecht flees the scene in misery. The curtain closes as Berthe weeps over her Giselle's body.

=== Act II ===
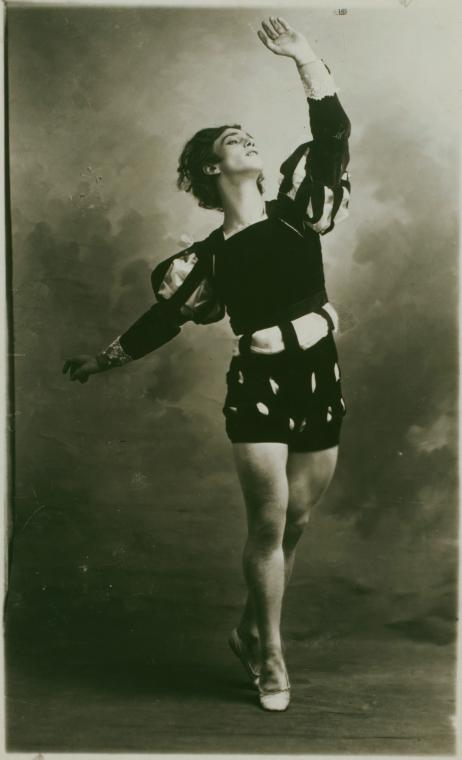
Vaslav Nijinsky as Albrecht, 1910

Late at night, Hilarion mourns at Giselle's forest grave, but is frightened away by the arrival of the Wilis, the ghostly spirits of maidens betrayed by their lovers. Many were abandoned on their wedding days, and all died of broken hearts. They, led by their merciless queen, Myrtha, dance and haunt the forest at night to exact their revenge on any man they encounter, regardless of who he may be, forcing their victims to dance until they die of exhaustion.

Myrtha and the Wilis rouse Giselle's spirit from her grave and induct her into their clan before disappearing into the forest. Albrecht arrives to lay flowers on Giselle's grave and he weeps with guilt over her death. Her spirit appears and he begs her forgiveness. She, her love undiminished unlike her vengeful sisters, gently forgives him. She disappears to join the rest of the Wilis and Albrecht desperately follows her.

Meanwhile, the Wilis have cornered a terrified Hilarion. They use their magic to force him to dance until he is nearly dead, and then drown him in a nearby lake. Then they spy Albrecht, and turn on him, sentencing him to death as well. He pleads to Myrtha for his life, but she coldly refuses. Giselle's pleas are also dismissed and he is forced to dance until sunrise. However, the power of Giselle's love counters the Wilis' magic and spares his life. The other spirits return to their graves at daybreak, but Giselle has broken through the chains of hatred and vengeance that control the Wilis, and is thus released from their powers and will haunt the forest no more. After bidding a tender farewell to Albrecht, she returns to her grave to rest in peace.

== Background ==
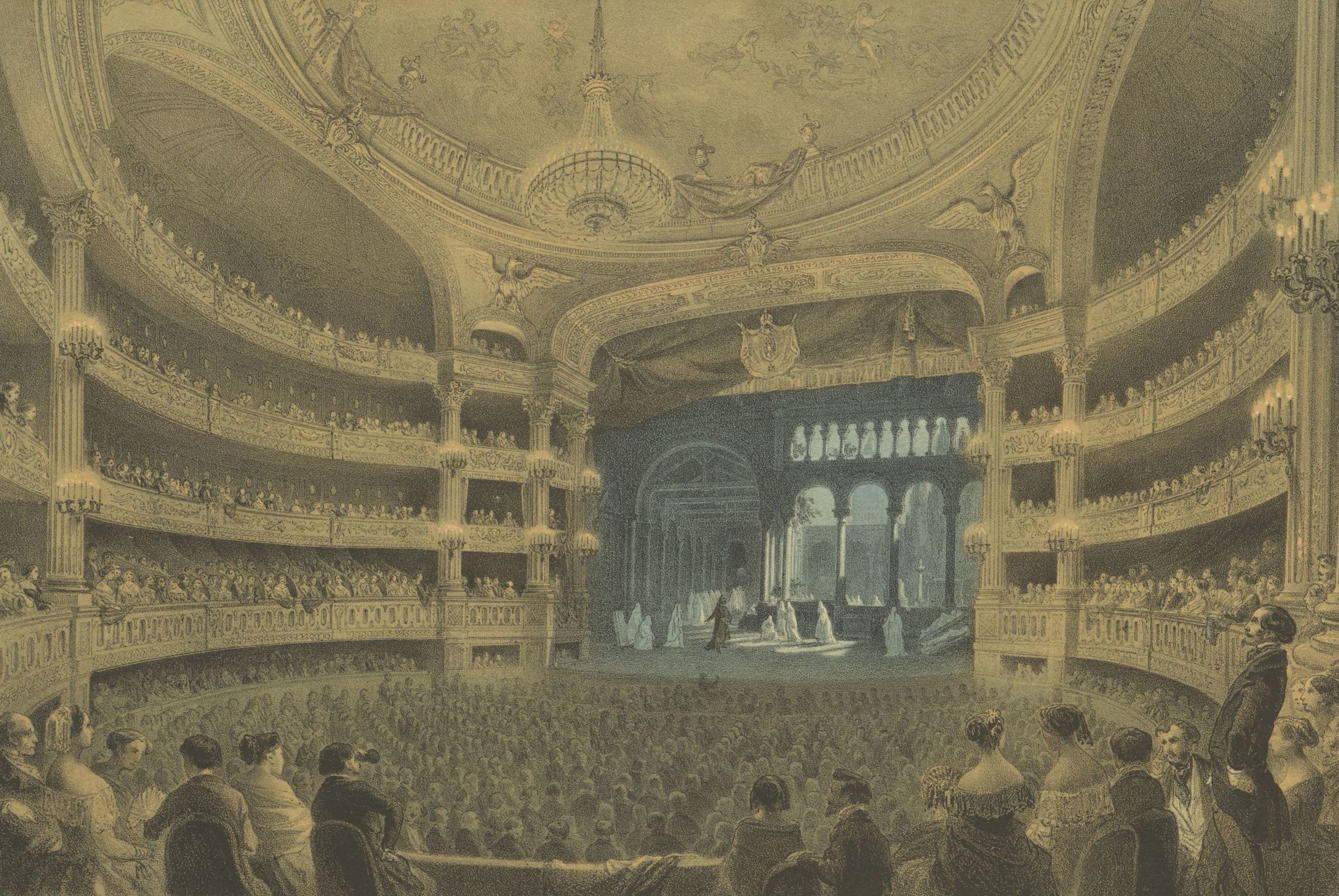
The Ballet of the Nuns in the Salle Le Peletier, 1831

The French Revolution (1789–1799) brought sweeping changes to theatre in France. Banished were the ballets the aristocracy preferred about the gods and goddesses of Mount Olympus. Instead, ballets about everyday people, real places, real time, the historical past, and the supernatural took prominence. These sorts of ballets were preferred by the burgeoning middle class.

Two ballets caused great excitement in Paris in the 1830s. In November 1831, Meyerbeer's opera Robert le diable had its first performance. It featured a short ballet called Ballet of the Nuns. In this little ballet, nuns rise from their graves to dance in the moonlight. The public loved this little supernatural ballet.

In March 1832, the ballet La Sylphide debuted in Paris. This ballet is about a beautiful sylph who loves James, a young Scotsman. Tragedy occurs. After dallying in the woods, the sylph dies when her earthly lover uses a bewitched scarf to trap her. This ballet brought Marie Taglioni before the French public. She was the first to dance en pointe for artistic reasons rather than spectacle and was also the first to wear the white, bell-shaped, calf-length ballet skirt now considered an essential feature of the romantic ballet. Poet and critic Théophile Gautier attended the first performance of La Sylphide. His ideas for Giselle would show touches of La Sylphide ten years later. It would be set in a real place and in the past, for example, and would be about everyday people and supernatural women.

== Development ==
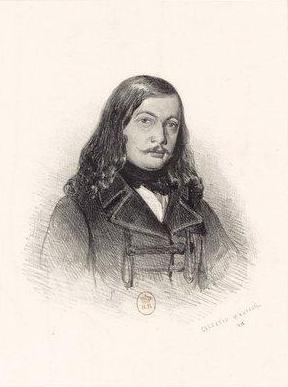
Théophile Gautier, 1838

In an 1841 news article announcing the first performance of Giselle, Théophile Gautier recorded his part in the creation of the ballet. He had read Heinrich Heine's description of the Wilis in De l'Allemagne and thought these evil spirits would make a "pretty ballet". He planned their story for act 2 and settled upon a verse by Victor Hugo called "Fantômes" to provide the inspiration for act 1. This verse is about a beautiful 15-year-old Spanish girl who loves to dance. She becomes too warm at a ball and dies of a chill in the cool morning.

Heine's prose passage in De l'Allemagne tells of supernatural young women called the Wilis. They have died before their wedding day and rise from their graves in the middle of the night to dance. Any young man who crosses their path is forced to dance to his death. In another book, the Wilis are said to be jilted young women who have died and become vampires. This is assumed to be the reason that they hate men.

Gautier thought Heine's Wilis and Hugo's fifteen-year-old Spanish girl would make a good ballet story. His first idea was to present an empty ballroom glittering with crystal and candlelight. The Wilis would cast a spell over the floor. Giselle and other dancers would enter and whirl through the room, unable to resist the spell to keep them dancing. Giselle would try to keep her lover from partnering other girls. The Queen of the Wilis would enter, lay her cold hand on Giselle's heart and the girl would drop dead.

Gautier was not satisfied with this story. It was basically a succession of dances with one moment of drama at its end. He had no experience writing ballet scenarios so he called upon Vernoy de St. Georges, a man who had written many ballet librettos. St. Georges liked Gautier's basic idea of the frail young girl and the Wilis. He wrote the story of Giselle as it is known today in three days, and sent it to Léon Pillet, the director of the Paris Opéra. Pillet needed a good story to introduce Grisi to the Paris public. He found that story in Giselle. Grisi liked it as much as Pillet did, so Giselle was put into production at once.

== First performance ==
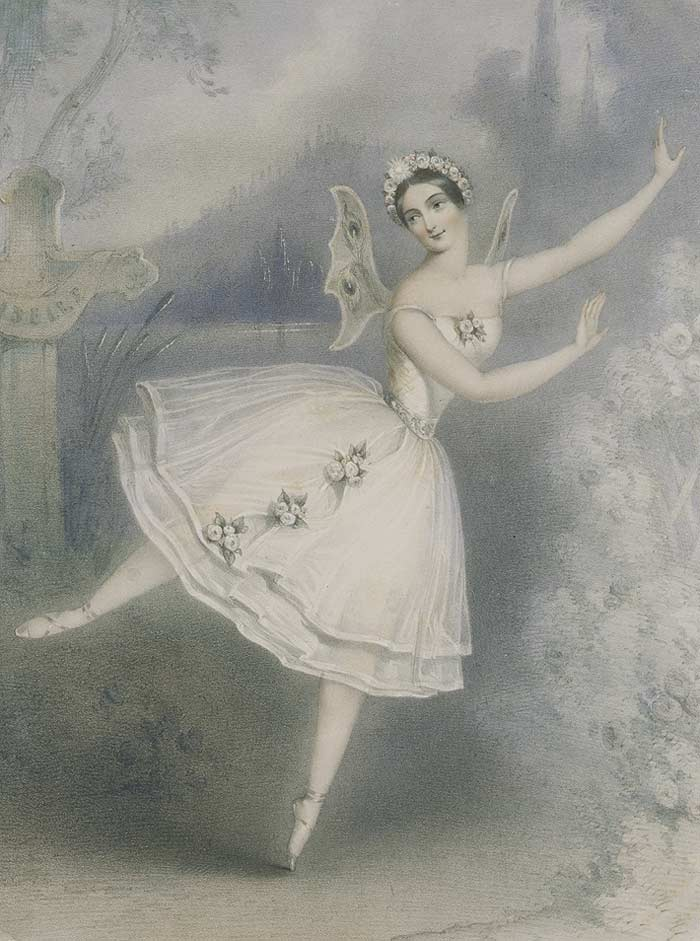
Carlotta Grisi as Giselle, 1841

The balletomanes of Paris became very excited as the opening night of Giselle approached. News reports kept their interest alive. Some reports said that Grisi had had an accident whilst other reports indicated that the conductor was ill with a tumor. Still others said that the stage hands feared for their safety.

Hopes that the ballet would be ready in May were dashed and the opening night was postponed several times. Grisi was absent for a few days and her return was delayed to protect her health. Lighting, trapdoors, and scene changes needed further rehearsals. Cuts were made in Grisi's role to spare the dancer's health. Instead of returning to her tomb at the end of the ballet, it was decided that she would be placed on a bed of flowers and sink slowly into the earth. This touch preserved the romantic mood of the act 2 finale.

At last, on Monday, 28 June 1841 the curtain rose on Giselle at the Salle Le Peletier. Grisi danced Giselle with Lucien Petipa as her lover Albrecht, Jean Coralli as the gamekeeper Hilarion, and Adèle Dumilâtre as Myrtha, the Queen of the Wilis. Typical of the theatrical practices of the time, Giselle was preceded by an excerpt from another production—in this case, the third act of Rossini's opera, Mosè in Egitto.

In spite of the chief machinist shouting orders to his crew that could be heard by the audience, Giselle was a great success. Grisi was a sensation. Ballet-goers regarded her as another Marie Taglioni, the greatest ballerina of the period.

== Contemporary reviews and comments ==
Giselle was a great artistic and commercial success. Le Constitutionnel praised act 2 for its "poetic effects". Moniteur des théâtres wrote that Grisi "runs [and] flies across the stage like a gazelle in love". One critic made a detailed analysis of the music in La France Musicale. He thought the act 1 waltz "ravishing" and noted that the scene of Berthe's narrative was filled with "quite new" harmonic modulations. He praised other moments in Act I (especially the mad scene), and was in raptures with the music of act 2, singling out the entrance of the Wilis and the viola solo played through Giselle's last moments. He thought the flute and harp music accompanying Giselle as she disappeared into her grave at ballet's end "full of tragic beauty".

Coralli was praised for the act 1 peasant pas de deux and for the "elegance" of act 2. Coralli followed a suggestion made by Gautier and picked the most beautiful girls in the company to play the peasants and the Wilis. One observer thought the selection process cruel: the almost-beautiful girls were turned away without a second thought.

Grisi and Petipa were great successes as the tragic lovers. Gautier praised their performance in act 2, writing that the two dancers made the act "a real poem, a choreographic elegy full of charm and tenderness ... More than one eye that thought it was seeing only [dance] was surprised to find its vision obscured by a tear—something that does not often happen in a ballet ... Grisi danced with a perfection ... that places her in the ranks between Elssler and Taglioni ... Her miming surpassed every expectation ... She is nature and artlessness personified."

Adam thought Petipa "charming" as both dancer and actor, and that he had "rehabilitated" male dancing with his performance. Of Dumilâtre he wrote, "... in spite of her coldness, [Dumilâtre] deserved the success she achieved by the correctness and the 'mythological' quality of her poses: perhaps this word may seem a little pretentious, but I can think of no other to express such cold and noble dancing as would suit Minerva in a merry mood, and in this respect [Dumilâtre] seems to bear a strong resemblance to that goddess."

Giselle made 6 500 French francs (equivalent to 37 529 € in 2015) between June and September 1841. This was twice the amount for the same time period in 1839. Grisi's salary was increased to make her the top earner among the dancers at the Opéra. Souvenirs were sold, pictures of Grisi as Giselle were printed, and sheet music arrangements were made for social dancing. The sculptor Emile Thomas made a statuette of Giselle in her act 2 costume. A silk cloth was manufactured called façonné Giselle, and Madame Lainné, a milliner, sold an artificial flower called 'Giselle'. The ballet was parodied at the Théâtre du Palais-Royal in October 1841.

== Music ==
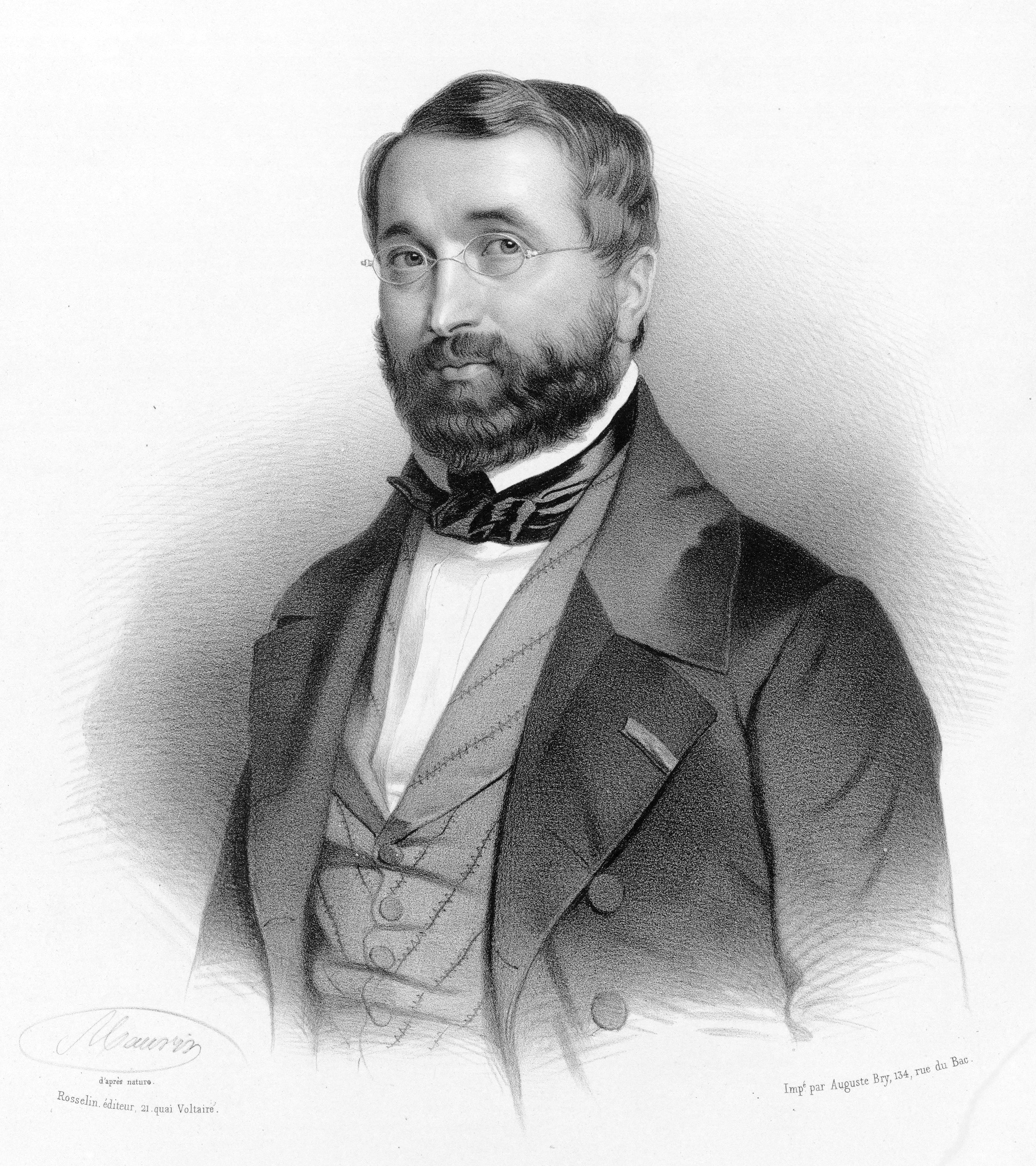
Adolphe Adam about 1835

Adolphe Adam was a popular writer of ballet and opera music in early 19th-century France. He wrote with great speed and completed Giselle in about two months. The music was written in the smooth, song-like style of the day called cantilena. This style is well known to music lovers from Bellini's opera Norma and Donizetti's Lucia di Lammermoor.

Adam used several leitmotifs in the ballet. This is a short musical phrase that is associated with a certain character, event, or idea. There is a leitmotif associated with Giselle and another with Albrecht. Hilarion's motif marks his every entrance. It suggests the Fate theme in Beethoven's Fifth Symphony.

Another leitmotif is associated with the "he loves me, he loves me not" flower test in act 1, which is heard again in the mad scene, and in act 2 when Giselle offers flowers to Albrecht. The Wilis have their own motif. It is heard in the overture, in act 1 when Berthe tells the story of the Wilis, and in the mad scene. It is heard again in act 2 when the Wilis make their first entrance. The hunting horn motif marks sudden surprises. This motif is heard when Albrecht is exposed as a nobleman.

The music was completely original. A critic noted, however, that Adam had borrowed eight bars from a romance by a Miss Puget and three bars from the huntsman's chorus in Carl Maria von Weber's opera Euryanthe.

One dance historian wrote:

By no stretch of the imagination can the score of Giselle be called great music, but it cannot be denied that it is admirably suited to its purpose. It is danceable, and it has colour and mood attuned to the various dramatic situations ... As we listen today to these haunting melodies composed over a century ago, we quickly become conscious of their intense nostalgic quality, not unlike the opening of a Victorian Keepsake, between whose pages lies an admirably preserved Valentine—in all the glory of its intricate paper lace and symbolic floral designs—which whispers of a leisured age now forever past. For a brief space the air seems faintly perfumed with parma violet and gardenia. The music of Giselle still exerts its magic.

— Cyril W. Beaumont, A Ballet Called Giselle, p. 58

=== Additions to the score ===
Adam's score for Giselle acquired several additional numbers over the course of its history, with some of these pieces becoming an integral part of the ballet's performance tradition.

Immediately following the first répétition générale of Giselle on the stage of the Paris Opéra, the danseuse Nathalie Fitz-James used her influence as the mistress of an influential patron of the theatre to have a pas inserted for herself into the ballet. Coralli quickly arranged the "Pas de deux des jeunes paysans" ("Pas de deux of young peasants") for Fitz-James and the danseur Auguste Mabille, with music arranged from pieces by the composer Friedrich Burgmüller including his Souvenirs de Ratisbonne for the coda.

For Carlotta Grisi's performances as Giselle with the Imperial Ballet in Saint Petersburg, Perrot commissioned the composer Cesare Pugni to score a new pas de cinq for the ballerina that was added to the first tableau. This pas was only retained for Grisi's performances and never performed again after her departure from Saint Petersburg.

Marius Petipa commissioned an additional pas de deux from the composer Ludwig Minkus for the choreographer's 1884 revival of Giselle for the ballerina Maria Gorshenkova. Minkus based the music for this pas on airs taken from Adolphe Adam's score for the ballet Orfa.

Three solo variations were added to the ballet by Petipa during the latter half of the 19th century. The first was arranged in 1867 for the Grand pas de deux of the second tableau for the ballerina Adèle Grantzow. The music was composed by Cesare Pugni and was based on Adolphe Adam's "he loves me, he loves me not" leitmotif. This variation has been retained in the ballet ever since.

The second variation was added by Petipa to the first act of the ballet for the ballerina Emma Bessone's début as Giselle at the Mariinsky Theatre in September of 1887, and for this occasion the composer Riccardo Drigo wrote the music. The music was never used again after Bessone's departure from Russia until Agrippina Vaganova added it to the Peasant pas de deux for the Kirov Ballet's production of Giselle in 1932. The inclusion of this variation in the Peasant pas de deux remains part of the Mariinsky Theatre's performance tradition of Giselle to the present day.

The third variation added by Petipa was also composed by Drigo and has survived as one of the most beloved passages of Giselle. This variation, sometimes dubbed as the Pas seul, was arranged 1887 for the ballerina Elena Cornalba's performance in a revival of Saint-Léon's Fiametta. Cornalba then included it for her début in Giselle in December of that year, where it has remained ever since. The variation was also danced by many of Cornalba's successors in the role of Giselle at the Mariinsky Theatre. Cornalba's variation was first performed outside of Russia by Olga Spessivtzeva in 1924 at the Paris Opéra, and from then on all productions staged outside of Russia included the variation. There was much confusion at that time as to who was responsible for composing the music, leading many ballet historians and musicologists to credit Ludwig Minkus as the author, a misconception which still persists.

== Choreography ==
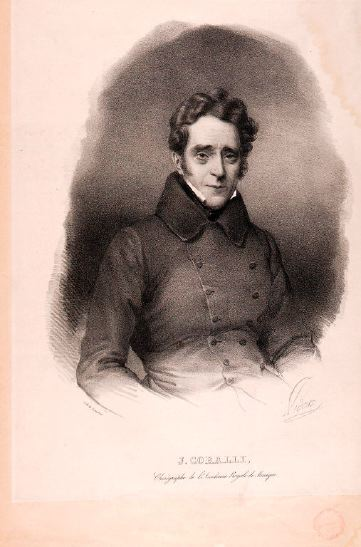
Jean Coralli about 1830

Jean Coralli and Jules Perrot choreographed the original version of Giselle. Perrot and Carlotta Grisi were lovers and, consequently, Perrot designed all of her dances and pantomime. Everyone in the Paris dance world knew that Perrot had created Grisi's dances and Coralli admitted it, but Perrot was given no official credit in the printed materials such as posters and programs. This was most likely done to prevent Perrot from collecting royalties on the ballet. Perrot liked bold touches and planned several rapid aerial swoops on wires in act 2 for Giselle. Grisi was afraid of these swoops, therefore a stage hand was brought in to test them. He crashed face-first into the scenery and the swoops were dropped.

Cyril Beaumont writes that Giselle is made up of two elements: dance and mime. Act 1 features short mimed scenes, he points out, and episodes of dancing which are fused with mime. In act 2, mime has become fused entirely with dance. He indicates that the choreographic vocabulary is composed of a small number of simple steps:

- Movements: développé, grand rond de jambe
- Poses: arabesque, attitude
- Gliding steps: chasse, glissade, pas de basque, pas de bourrée
- Hopping steps: balloné, temps levé
- Turning steps: pirouette, petit tour, tour en l'air
- Leaping steps: (vertical) ballotte, entrechat, sisonne, rond de jambe en l'air sauté, (horizontal) cabriole, jeté, grande jeté, soubresaut

Beaumont speculates that the simple steps were deliberately planned to allow the "utmost expressiveness".

Parts of Giselle have been cut or changed since the ballet's first night. Giselle's act 1 pantomime scene in which she tells Albrecht of her strange dream is cut and the peasant pas de deux is also slightly cut back. The Duke of Courland and his daughter Bathilde used to make their entrance on horseback, but today they walk on. In the original production they were present at Giselle's death, but now they leave the scene before she dies. The machines used to make Giselle fly and to make her disappear are no longer employed. A trapdoor is sometimes utilized to make Giselle rise from her grave and then sink into it at the end of act 2. At the end of act 2 Bathilde formerly entered with the courtiers to search for Albrecht. He took a few unsteady steps toward them and then collapsed into their arms. This moment was an artistic parallel to the act 1 finale when the peasants gathered about the dead Giselle. Now, Bathilde and the courtiers are cut and Albrecht slowly leaves the stage alone.

== Ethnic elements ==
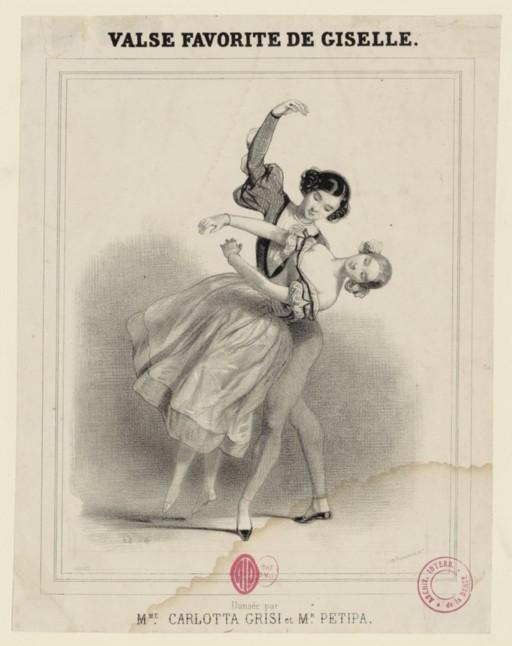
Grisi and Petipa on the sheet music cover of "Valse favorite de Giselle"

Ethnic music, dance, and costume were a large part of romantic ballet. At the time Giselle was written, people thought of Germany when they heard a waltz because the waltz is of German origin. Giselle makes her first entrance to the music of a waltz, and the audience would have known at once that the ballet was set in Germany. Adam wrote three waltzes for Giselle: two for Giselle and one for the Wilis. He said that the "Giselle Waltz" in act 1 has "all the German color indicated by the locality" and people agreed. One critic wrote: "A lovely waltz ... in the Germanic spirit of the subject".

At first, Gautier thought that some of the dancers in the waltz for the Wilis should dress in ethnic costume and dance ethnic steps. Adam put bits of French, Spanish, German, and Indian-sounding music in the waltz for this purpose. Gautier's "ethnic" idea was dropped as the ballet developed and it has not been picked up by modern producers. Today, act 2 is a ballet blanc (a "white" ballet in which all the ballerinas and the corps de ballet are dressed in full, white, bell-shaped skirts and the dances have a geometric design).

== Sets and costumes ==
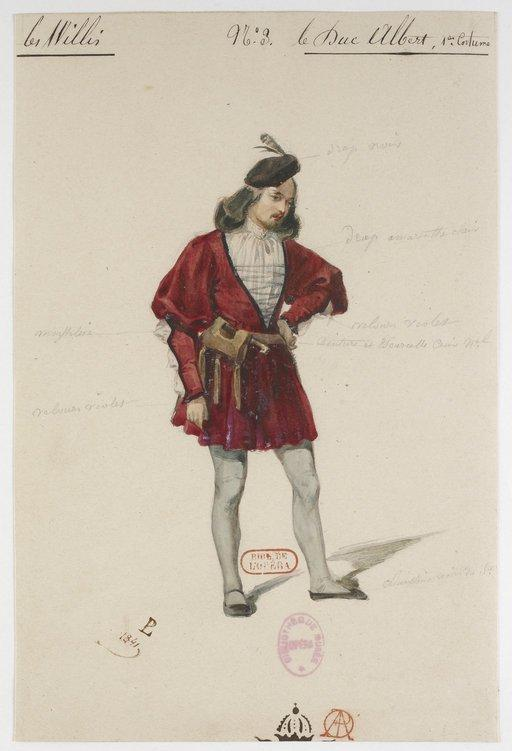
Albrecht by Paul Lormier

The historical period for Giselle is not indicated in the story. Paul Lormier, the chief costume designer at the Paris Opéra, probably consulted Gautier on this matter. It is also possible that Pillet had the ballet's budget in mind and decided to use the many Renaissance-style costumes in the Opéra's wardrobe for Giselle. These costumes were said to have been those from Rossini's William Tell (1829) and Berlioz's Benvenuto Cellini (1838). Lormier certainly designed the costumes for the principal characters. His costumes were in use at the Opéra until the ballet was dropped from the repertoire in 1853.

Giselle was revived in 1863 with new costumes by Lormier's assistant, Alfred Albert. Albert's costumes are closer to those of modern productions than those of Lormier, and were in use at the opera until 1868. The ballet was revived again in 1924 with scenery and costumes by Alexandre Benois. He wanted to revive the costumes of the original production but dropped the idea, believing the critics would charge him with a lack of imaginative creativity.

=== Sets ===
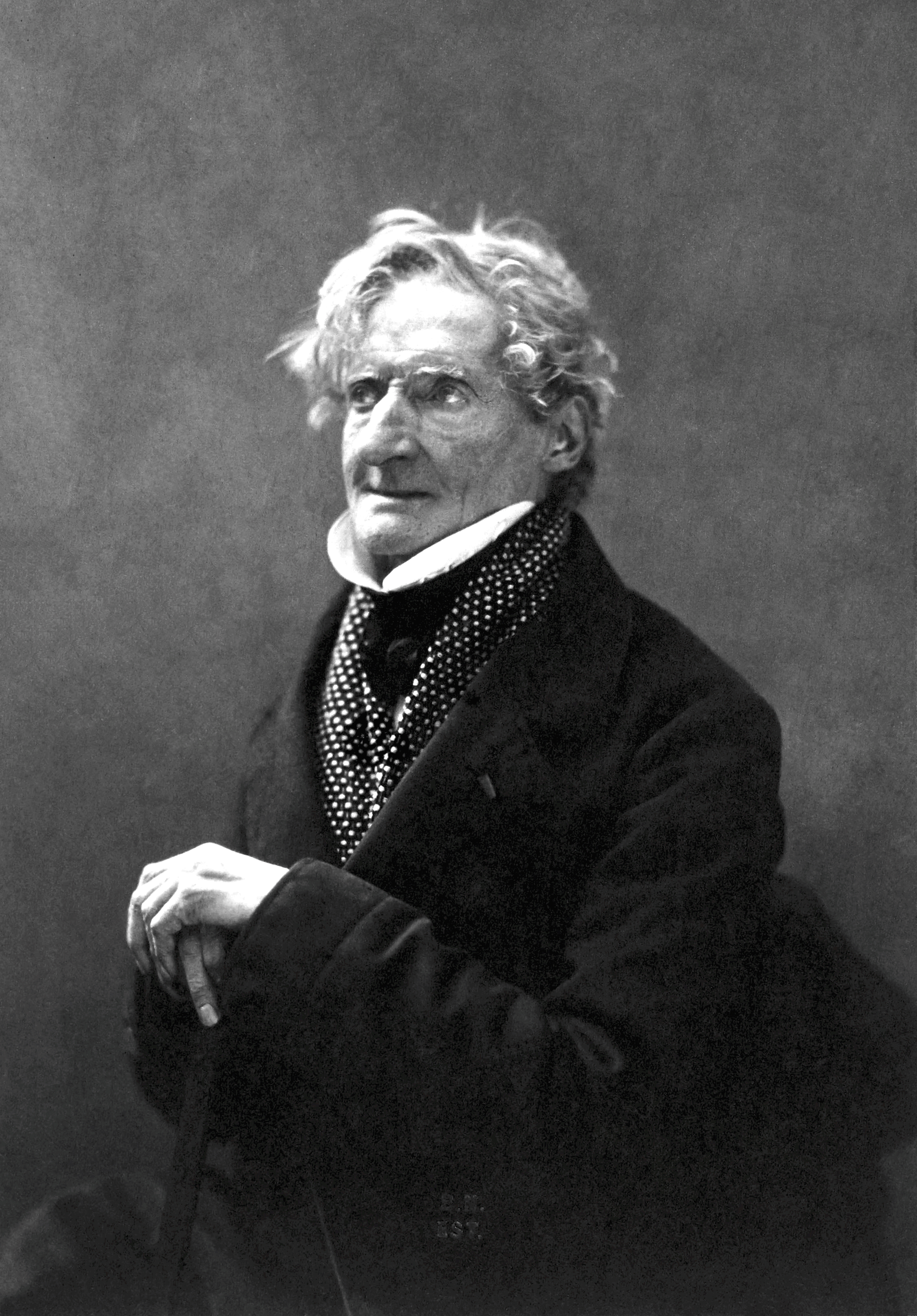
Photograph of Ciceri, c. 1857

Pierre Luc Charles Ciceri was the chief set designer at the Paris Opéra from 1815 to 1847. He designed the sets for the first production of Giselle. Gautier was not specific about the ballet's locale, but placed it in "some mysterious corner of Germany ... on the other side of the Rhine".

Giselle was two months in rehearsal, which was a very long rehearsal time for the period. Even so, Ciceri did not have enough time to design sets for both acts and focused on the second act. The sets for the first act were actually those designed for the 1838 ballet, La Fille du Danube by Adam. An illustration from Les Beautés de l'Opera of 1845 shows Giselle's cottage with a roof of straw on the left and Albrecht's cottage on the right. The two cottages are framed by the branches of two large trees on either sides of the stage. Between the two cottages, in the distance, appears a castle and slopes covered with vineyards. Although this scene was not designed for Giselle, it has remained the model for most modern productions. Ciceri's set was in use until the ballet was dropped from the repertoire in 1853. At that time, Gautier noticed that the sets were falling apart: "Giselle's cottage has barely three or four straws on its roof."

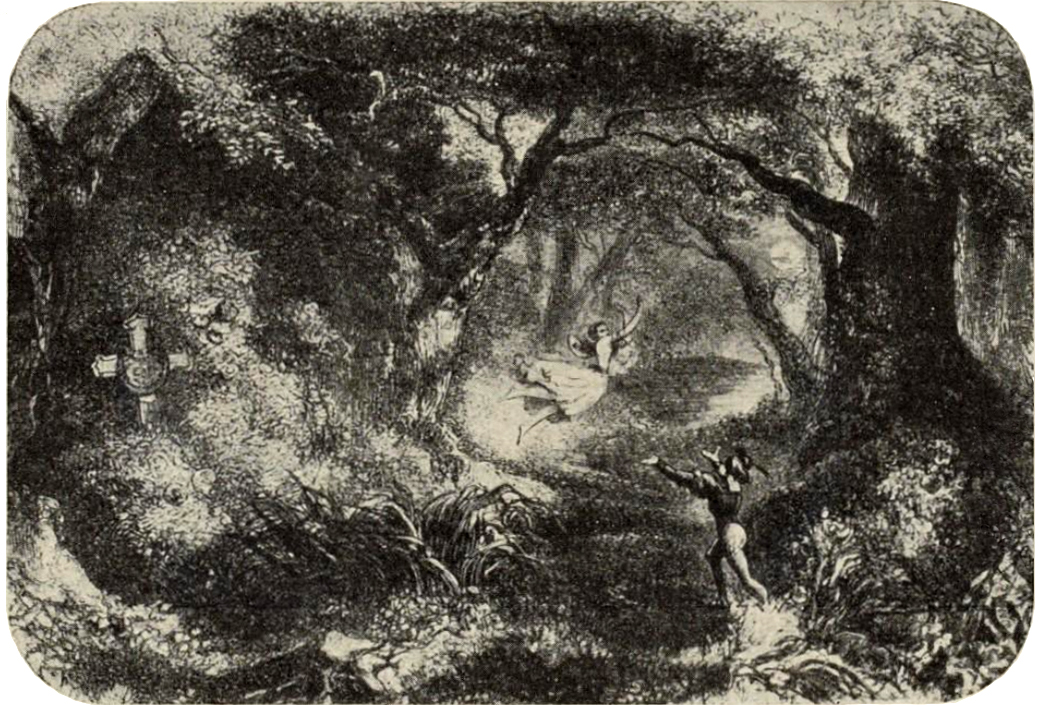
Act 2 from Les Beautés de l'Opéra

The act 2 illustration from Les Beautés shows a dark wood with a pool of water in the distance. The branches of aged trees create a tree tunnel. Beneath these branches on the left is a marble cross with 'Giselle' carved on it. From one of its arms hangs the crown of grape leaves Giselle wore as Queen of the Vintage. On the stage, thick weeds and wildflowers (200 bulrushes and 120 branches of flowers) were the undergrowth. The gas jets of the footlights and those overhead suspended in the flies were turned low to create a mood of mystery and terror.

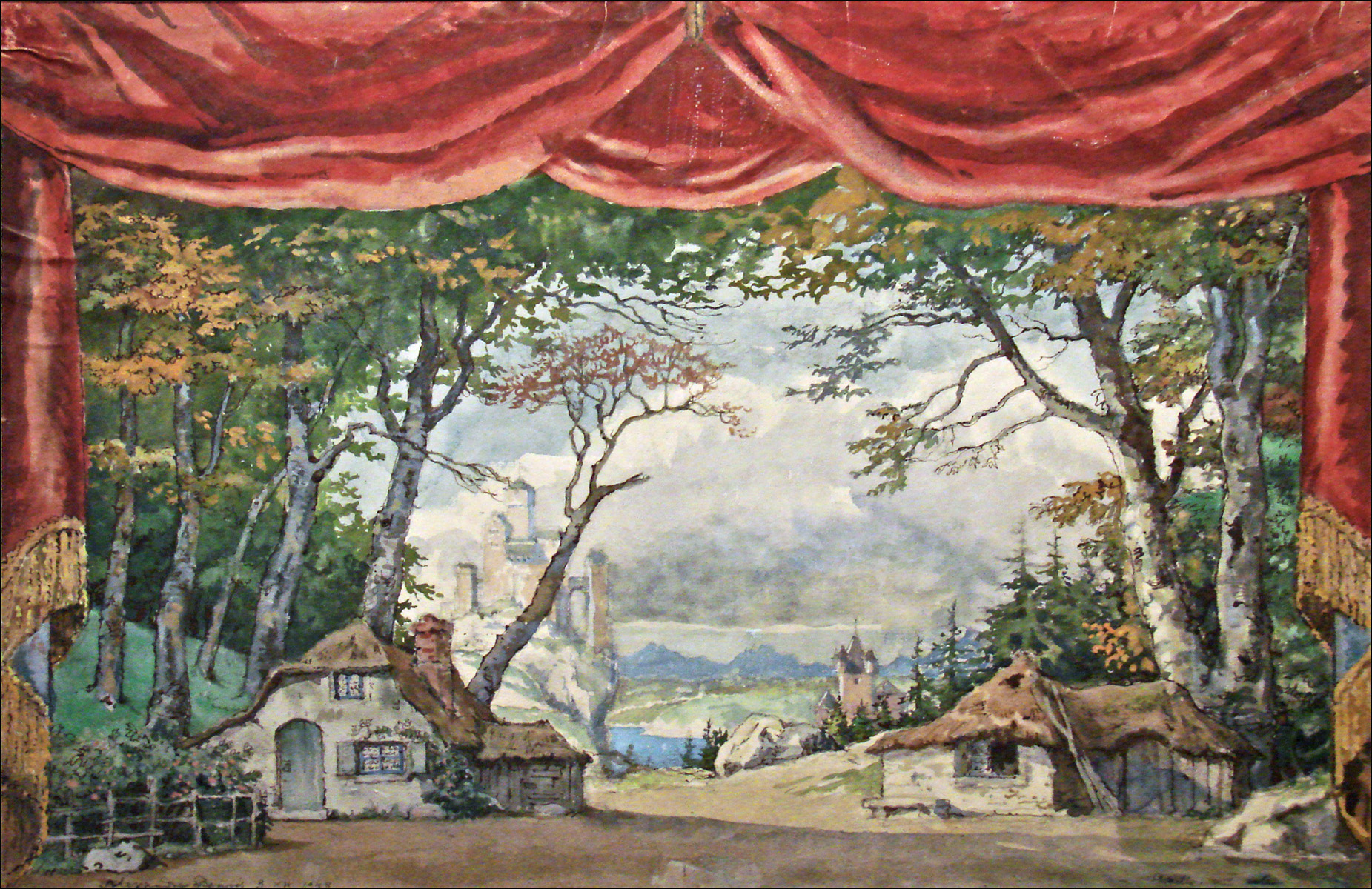
Benois' design for act 1 at the Paris Opera, 1910

A circular hole was cut into the backdrop and covered with a transparent material. A strong light behind this hole represented the moon. The light was occasionally manipulated to suggest the passage of clouds. Gautier and St. Georges wanted the pool to be made of large mirrors but Pillet rejected this idea because of its cost. In the 1868 revival, however, mirrors were acquired for this scene.

Adam thought Ciceri's backdrop for act 1 was "not so good ... it is all weak and pale" but he liked the set for act 2: "[Ciceri's] second act is a delight, a dark humid forest filled with bulrushes and wild flowers, and ending with a sunrise, seen at first through the trees at the end of the piece, and very magical in its effect." The sunrise also delighted the critics.

== Early productions ==
Giselle was performed in Paris from its debut in 1841 to 1849, with Grisi always dancing the title role. In 1849, it was dropped from the repertoire. The ballet was revived in 1852 and 1853, without Grisi, then dropped from the repertoire after 1853. It was revived in 1863 for a Russian ballerina, then dropped again in 1868. It was revived almost 50 years later in 1924 for the debut of Olga Spessivtzeva. This production was revived in 1932 and 1938.

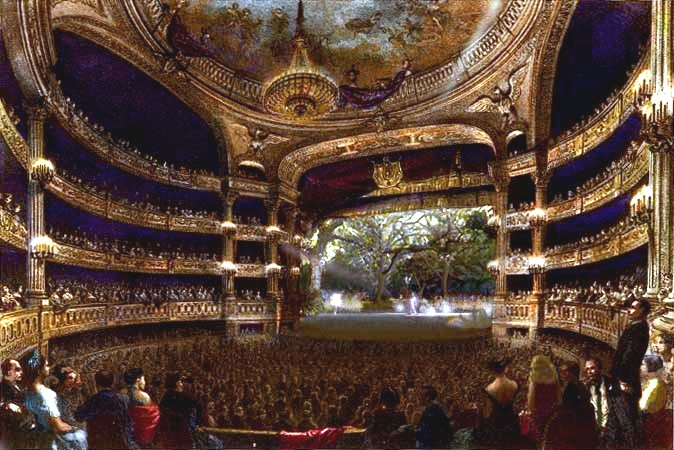
Ballet in the Salle Le Peletier in 1864

Giselle was mounted by other ballet companies in Europe and America almost immediately after its first night. The British had their first taste of Giselle with a drama based on the ballet called Giselle, or The Phantom Night Dancers by William Moncrieff, who had seen the ballet in Paris the same year. The play was performed on 23 August 1841 at the Theatre Royal, Sadler's Wells. The actual ballet was first staged in London at Her Majesty's Theatre on 12 March 1842 with Grisi as Giselle and Perrot as Albrecht. The dances were credited to Perrot and one Deshayes. This production was revived many times, once in 1884 with a Mlle. Sismondi in the role of Albrecht. This production, preceded by an operetta called Pocahontas, met with little enthusiasm.

Giselle was first performed in Russia at the Bolshoi Theatre, Saint Petersburg, on 18 December 1842. Stepan Gedeonov, the Director of the Saint Petersburg Imperial Theatres, sent his ballet master Antoine Titus to Paris to find a new ballet for ballerina Yelena Andreyanova. Titus chose Giselle. The Ballet Master then staged the work completely from memory in Saint Petersburg. Perrot produced Giselle in Saint Petersburg in 1851. He made many changes to the ballet in his years of service to the Imperial Ballet. In the 1880s, Petipa made many changes to the Perrot production.

Giselle was first staged in Italy at Teatro alla Scala in Milan on 17 January 1843. The music however was not Adam's but that of Niccolò Bajetti. The dances were not the original either but those of Antonio Cortesi. It is possible that the ballet was first staged in the provincial theatres. This, however, is not known with certainty.

In 1844, American ballerina Mary Ann Lee arrived in Paris to study with Coralli for a year. She returned to the United States in 1845 with the directions for Giselle and other ballets. Lee was the first to present Giselle in the United States. She did this on 1 January 1846 in Boston at the Howard Athenæum. George Washington Smith played Albrecht. Lee danced Giselle (again with Smith) on 13 April 1846 at the Park Theatre in New York City.

In January 1911 Nijinsky danced in Giselle at the Mariinsky Theatre in Saint Petersburg for the Imperial Ballet, with the Tsarina Maria Feodorovna in attendance. His costume, which had been designed by Alexandre Benois and used in Paris before, caused a scandal, as he danced in tights without the then-common trousers. He refused to apologize and was dismissed from the Imperial Ballet.

The ballet was staged by Diaghilev's Ballets Russes later in 1911 at the Royal Opera, Covent Garden, with Tamara Karsavina and Nijinsky as Giselle and Albrecht. Anna Pavlova danced Giselle with her own company in 1913. Alicia Markova danced the role with the Vic-Wells Ballet in 1934, and Margot Fonteyn took the role in 1937 when Markova left the company. The English loved Giselle. In 1942, for example, three different companies were dancing the ballet in London.

In a departure from the traditional Giselle, Frederic Franklin restaged the ballet in 1984 as Creole Giselle for the Dance Theatre of Harlem. This adaptation set the ballet among the Creoles and African Americans in 1840s Louisiana.

A 2012 novel by author Guy Mankowski entitled Letters from Yelena follows the journey of a principal dancer as she performs the role of Giselle in Saint Petersburg.

The 2019 South Korean TV series Angel's Last Mission: Love features a blind ballerina who is to play the title role of Giselle in a production staged by the Fantasia Ballet Company.

== General and cited references ==
- Ashton, Geoffrey (1985), Giselle, Woodbury, New York: Barron's, ISBN 0-8120-5673-6
- Balanchine, George (1979), 101 Stories of the Great Ballets, New York: Anchor Books, ISBN 0-385-03398-2
- Beaumont, Cyril W (1944), The Ballet Called Giselle, London: C W Beaumont
  - See also Beaumont, Cyril W (1996), The Ballet Called Giselle (2nd ed.), London: Dance Books, ISBN 1-85273-004-8
- Beaumont, Cyril W (1952), Supplement to the Complete Book of Ballets, London: Putnam
- Cordova, Sarah Davies (2007), "Romantic ballet in France: 1830–1850", in Kant, Marion (ed.), The Cambridge Companion to Ballet, Cambridge Companions to Music, Cambridge and New York: Cambridge University Press, ISBN 978-0-521-53986-9
- Edgecombe, Rodney Stenning (1 December 2005), "A Ragbag of Ballet Music Oddments", Brolga: An Australian Journal About Dance (23): 12–19
- Greskovic, Robert (2005), Ballet 101: A Complete Guide to Learning and Loving the Ballet, Limelight, ISBN 978-0-87910-325-5
- Guest, Ivor (1983), "Cesare Pugni: A Plea For Justice", Dance Research: The Journal of the Society for Dance Research, 1 (1), London: 30–38, doi:10.2307/1290799, ISSN 0264-2875, JSTOR 1290799
- Guest, Ivor (2008), The Romantic Ballet in Paris, Alton, Hampshire: Dance Books, ISBN 978-1-85273-119-9
- Kirstein, Lincoln (1984), Four Centuries of Ballet: Fifty Masterworks, New York: Dover, ISBN 0-486-24631-0
- Ostwald, Peter F. (1991). Vaslav Nijinsky: A Leap into Madness. New York: Carol Publishing Group. ISBN 0-8184-0535-X – via Internet Archive.
- Petipa, Marius (1971), Мариус Петипа. Материалы. Воспоминания. Статьи. (Marius Petipa: Materials, Memories, Articles), Leningrad: Iskusstvo (Искусство)
- Robert, Grace (1949), The Borzoi Book of Ballets, New York: Knopf, OCLC 16747462
- Smakov, Gennadi (1967), Giselle perf. by the Bolshoi Theatre Orch., cond. by Algis Zhuraitis (liner note for LP SRB4118), Moscow: Melodiya
- Smith, Marian (2000), Ballet and Opera in the Age of "Giselle", Princeton, New Jersey: Princeton University Press, ISBN 978-0-691-04994-6
- Travaglia, Silvio (1929), Riccardo Drigo: L'uomo e l'artista, Padua: Guglielmo Zanibon
