= Letters from Yelena =

Novel by Guy Mankowski

- First edition (publ. Legend Press)
- Author: Guy Mankowski
- Language: English
- Publisher: Legend Press
- Publication date: 2012

Letters from Yelena (2012) was the second 'breakthrough' novel by English writer Guy Mankowski.

== Development ==
The book was the second novel of Mankowski's to be published by Legend Press. To develop this epistolary novel he was awarded a grant by the Arts and Humanities Research Council, allowing him to interview Russian ballerinas at the Vaganova Academy of Russian Ballet and the Mariinsky Theatre in St Petersburg.

== Synopsis ==
The novel opens with a series of letters between a Natalya Brodvich and the executor of a literary estate she is negotiating with. Natalya is desperate to get hold of a set of letters which are the only trace of her departed mother, Yelena. Once Natalya successfully acquires them, we begin to read Yelena's letters. We learn that she was a psychologically damaged ballerina who tried to map out her mind through letters to a novelist called Noah, who became her lover. The letters chronicle Yelena's childhood in Donetsk, and how she escaped abuse at the hands of her stepmother. The story follows her training as a ballerina in St Petersburg, hoping to achieve her ambition of becoming a principal dancer and performing the lead in Giselle. Inspired by a poem by Heinrich Heine, Giselle tells the tale of a young girl who dies after being seduced by a nobleman. From beyond the grave, Giselle saves her lover from a death sentence by vengeful spirits. As her life progresses, Yelena sees more and more parallels between her life and the life of Giselle.

== Reception ==
A review from Novel Kicks said 'I did struggle through the first few pages but I am glad I stuck with it as I found it to be a beautifully written story with convincing characters and a good if sometimes heartbreaking plot. Yelena's journey is compelling…I found that I couldn't put it down. Overall, a great novel from Mankowski'.

A review from The Simple Things said 'Mankowski brings every bruised and strained limb to life, and takes the always present fascination with the torments of ballet dancers, from The Red Shoes and The Black Swan (film), and adds a bit of a romantic twist.'

New Books magazine called it 'a truly wonderful epistolary novel…with its dark thematic intensity of child abuse leading the main protagonist Yelena into self-harming, and ultimately suffering mental health problems', adding 'considering that the author is male, he has managed to capture a realistic portrayal of a female ballerina as she strives to reach her desired goal of performing Giselle.'

Dora Frankel created a dance based on a pivotal scene from the book, in which the lead was performed by Argentinian dancer Laila Sanz. An excerpt of the novel was used as GCSE training material by Osiris Educational. The novel was one of the titles chosen to be given away by Virgin Trains for 'World Books Day'.

In 2022 an analysis of the depiction of Russia on the website 'Russia In Fiction' by author of 'Inside Russian Politics' Edwin Bacon wrote that the books ‘well-crafted descriptions of setting briefly bring Russia to the fore’ but concluded that ‘its force and focus lie in a story of hurt and passion, grief and love, determination and fragility. Guy Mankowski crafts moments that make us want to cheer, and moments of heart-stirring sadness. That they have a Russia connection is a cause for Russia in Fiction’s gratitude.’
