= Paul Moore (banking manager) =

British banking manager (1958-2020)

Paul Russell Moore (30 October 1958 – September 28, 2020) was best known as the HBOS whistleblower following his dismissal from Halifax Bank of Scotland (HBOS) in 2004. Moore was the bank's Head of Group Regulatory Risk and was fired from the role by HBOS Group Chief Executive Office James Crosby following his warnings to the Board about HBOS's risky sales strategies.

In 2009, Moore's evidence about HBOS was presented to the UK House of Commons Treasury Select Committee and resulted in James Crosby resigning as Deputy Chairman of the Financial Services Authority (now the Financial Conduct Authority). Crosby, who was also an adviser to the then British Prime Minister Gordon Brown, later gave up his knighthood and part of his pension after a Parliamentary report was highly critical of his, HBOS Chairman Lord Dennis Stevenson's and HBOS CEO Andy Hornby's management of the bank. Since his dismissal Moore has been shunned by the financial community and has been unable to find another job in the sector. He continued to fight for change in the financial system and to bring those responsible for the 2008 crisis to justice.

== Early life ==
Paul Russell Moore was born in Bristol, England on 30 October 1958. He was educated at Ampleforth College in North Yorkshire and studied law at Bristol University.

== Early career ==
After becoming a barrister, he became the in-house lawyer in the product development department of Allied Dunbar in December 1984. He left in December 1988 to join Kleinworth Benson as its in-house lawyer but was only there until April 1989 when he was headhunted by start-up firm Ellastone. In February 1990, he moved to American Express subsidiary Acuma as General Counsel and Head of Compliance and was there until February 1994. In February 1995, Moore joined accountancy firm KPMG becoming its top-performing Partner.

== HBOS ==
Moore joined HBOS in July 2002 as Head of Risk in the Insurance and Investment Division. He was appointed to the role of Head of Group Regulatory Risk at the end of 2003. He had formal responsibility for the bank's policy and oversight of executive management's compliance with FSA regulation. It was during 2004 whilst conducting reviews of the bank's sales culture and selling practices that Moore and his team uncovered mis-selling and other unfair customer sales tactics. However, when Moore reported these findings, as his job demanded, he was fired on 8 November 2004.

Moore's complaints were investigated at the time (before the crisis) by accountancy firm KPMG, who concluded that HBOS had appropriate risk controls in place; this was accepted by the Financial Services Authority.

In November 2004, Moore was dismissed by HBOS. He claimed this was because he had told HBOS's board that the bank was taking excessive risks with its aggressive sales culture which was out of balance with its systems and controls. He passed his concerns about HBOS to the FSA, who had it investigated by KPMG, whose conclusion, that HBOS had appropriate risk controls in place, was accepted by the FSA. Following his dismissal the bank replaced him with a retail sales manager.

He sued HBOS for unfair dismissal on the basis that the reason for his dismissal was actually his warnings of excessive risk, which if followed would have reduced the bank's profits while protecting it from what proved to be the all-too-real risk. The bank settled his claim for over half a million pounds in mid-2005.

In 2008, HBOS was forced into a merger and then bailed out by a multibillion-pound infusion of capital from the Treasury.

Although Moore had agreed to the non-disclosure agreement as part of his settlement, he decided to speak out after the crisis because he believed it to be in the public interest and on 10 February 2009 Moore submitted a memorandum of evidence to the UK's Treasury Select Committee, which was investigating risks taken by UK banks prior to the credit crunch.

== After HBOS ==
Moore ran a risk consultancy, Moore Carter and Associates, and was the non-executive Chairman of Assetz Capital, a peer-to-peer lender aimed at SMEs and property developers in the UK. Moore was married with three children and last lived in North Yorkshire.

Moore announced his intention to publish a book about the HBOS whistle blowing and subsequent events called "Crash, Bank, Wallop". The book was co-authored by Mike Haworth, edited by Guy Mankowski and published in November 2015. Moore also launched The New Wilberforce Movement to "free the world from the slavery of greed".

== Death ==
Paul Moore died of colitis on September 28, 2020, aged 61.
