= Georgina Kamsika =

- Born: South Yorkshire
- Education: Nottingham Trent University
- Occupation: Writer

Georgina Rachael Kamsika is a British author of speculative fiction. Her genres switch between science fiction, horror and fantasy. Her debut novel The Sulphur Diaries was published in November 2011 by Legend Press.

== Biography ==
Kamsika was born in Rotherham, South Yorkshire to Anglo-Indian parents. She moved to Nottingham to attend university. Post graduation, she worked at first in E-Learning, specialising in accessibility, before moving on to work on more commercial websites. She is non-binary and uses she or they pronouns.

== Career ==
Kamsika has had several short stories published in numerous magazines or book anthologies. She is a member of the British Science Fiction Association and the Horror Writers Association. In 2012 she attended the Clarion West Writers Workshop, with tutors such as George R.R. Martin and Chuck Palahniuk. She was a judge for the 2018 and 2019 British Fantasy Awards. She is a member of the Clarion West Evolving Workshop Culture Committee that aims to assess workshop models and improve the overall experience of everyone attending, especially for BIPOC and other marginalised writers. She attended the Toji Cultural Centre for the eight week UNESCO City of Literature Wonju Residency 2022 programme in September and October 2022. In 2026, she attended Martha’s Vineyard Institute of Creative Writing as a Poet and Author Fellow.

== Works ==
=== Novel ===
- Goddess of the North (2020)
- The Sulphur Diaries (2011)

=== Short stories ===
- The Many Deaths of Johnny Silver (2010)
- Our Fathers' Eyes (2010)
- Mission Six (2010)
- Communication (2010)
- Acceptable Suitors (2010)
- Cage the Beast (2010)
- Mother India (2010)
- Oracle (2012)
- Childhood Monsters (2012)
- Altus (2012)
- Dominance (2012)
- Nostalgia (2015)
- Samsara (2018)
- A Confluence of Stars (2020)
- Shadows Dawning (2021)
- With Anger, You Have Left Us (2022)
- The Lady of The Lake (2022)
- In The Stars' Brilliance (2025)
- The Dream Labyrinth (2025)
- Consecration (2026)
- The Stars Keep Their Promise (2026)
- We Are Not Them (2026)
- Fragments of Us (2026)
- Room 602 at the Hotel In-Between (2026)

=== Anthologies ===
- Letters from the Dead (2010)
- Five Stop Story: Short Stories to Read in 5 Stops on Your Commute (2011)
- Behind Locked Doors (2012)
- Orbital Hearts (2012)
- Fading Light (2013)
- Alien Sky (2013)
- After the Fall (2015)
- Not So Stories (2018)
- Tales from the Mount (2020)
- The Devourer Below: An Arkham Horror Anthology (2021)
- Selene Quarterly Magazine: The Complete Series (2022)
- Of Love and Dragons (2026)
- Of Swords and Roses (2026)

=== Essays ===
- Women Who Are More Than Strong (2014)
- How The British Chose Curry for Their National Dish (2018)
- What Is Sensitivity Reading? (2024)
- Working as a Sensitivity Reader: Just Another Step on the Way to Publication (2024)
