= Burn Your Town =

Studio album by The Chapman Family
- Released: 4 March 2011
- Recorded: 2009–2010
- Genre: Post-punk, indie rock
- Length: 37:19
- Label: Electric Toaster
- Producer: Richard Jackson

Singles from Burn Your Town
- 1. "Kids" Released: 27 April 2009; 2. "Virgins" Released: 26 October 2009; 3. "All Fall" Released: 22 September 2010; 4. "Anxiety" Released: 10 January 2011

Professional ratings
Review scores
Source	Rating
Consequence of Sound	C+
Drowned in Sound	6/10
NME	7/10
The Skinny	1/5 stars
Virgin Group	8/10 stars

Burn Your Town is the only album by the Chapman Family. It was released digitally on 4 March 2011 followed by a physical release on 7 March 2011.

== Track listing ==
No.	Title	Length
1.	"A Certain Degree"	3:30
2.	"All Fall"	2:37
3.	"Anxiety"	3:13
4.	"Sound of the Radio"	3:37
5.	"1,000 Lies"	4:02
6.	"She Didn't Know"	5:05
7.	"Something I Can't Get Out"	3:35
8.	"Kids"	2:57
9.	"Million Dollars"	6:45
10.	"Virgins (Reprise)"	3:58

iTunes bonus tracks
No.	Title	Length
11.	"Photographs"	3:06
12.	"Anxiety (Acoustic)"	3:04
13.	"Something I Can't Get Out (Acoustic)"	2:48
