= How I Left The National Grid =

2015 novel by Guy Mankowski

- First edition
- Author: Guy Mankowski
- Publisher: Roundfire Books
- Publication date: 2015
- ISBN: 9781782798965

How I Left The National Grid is the third novel by English author Guy Mankowski and released in 2015. Described in media as ‘hotly anticipated’, the book provoked some speculation regarding the inspiration behind protagonist Robert Wardner, a troubled rock star who was speculated to have been inspired by several real-life musicians.

== Background ==
The novel was written as part of a PhD in Creative Writing at Northumbria University. Undertaking research for it the author ‘landed meetings with bands and artists including Savages and Gazelle Twin'. Mankowski ‘sent a tweet to Jehnny Beth from Savages and was immediately invited to meet up with her’, which ‘opened up doors to meet with other artists too'. Their conversation was later published by Jehnny Beth, on her blog. According to Mankowski, 'The novel was hard to write, and went through two publishers and three agents before finding a home.' He added, 'these negotiations led to me write about thirty drafts of the novel and to often despair over whether the novel was worth anyone's time.'

After publication it was noted that there were ‘echoes of Richey Edwards and Ian Curtis of Joy Division, in the books main character’. Richey Edwards was co-lyricist of the Welsh alternative rock band Manic Street Preachers. Edwards suffered from depression, alcoholism, anorexia and self-harm and he disappeared on 1 February 1995. In a review of the book The Huffington Post recalled Edwards’ disappearance, adding ‘perhaps this is the figure that Guy Mankowski had in mind when he began to pen his latest novel’.

In an interview between Mankowski and Kingsley Chapman, former singer of The Chapman Family, Chapman added to speculation by commenting: ‘When I read your book and I visualise the band, at least two of them look like members of the Manics.’ Mankowski replied; ‘I’ve been asked before if my main character is based on one of their members and I always duck the question. Richey Edwards was such a brilliant artist, so I’m adverse to the idea of portraying him [directly] in a novel. The danger is I’ll reduce someone complex who wasn’t simply a member of a band I loved, but who had a whole other life that I don’t have a right to trespass into.’ In an interview with 3:AM Magazine in 2016 Mankowski confirmed 'Robert Wardner was a mix of influences – you rightly identify Richey Edwards and Ian Curtis, but I didn't want to fictionalize these people in a “straight” way as I didn't get to know them and felt it would be disrespectful, not to mention impossible, to portray such people. Mark E. Smith was also in the mix.'

Pages of the notebooks Mankowski used to research the novel were published in the 2015 academic textbook Creative Writing: A NAWE Handbook For Teachers.

== Plot ==
The book is ‘written from the alternating perspective of Robert Wardner, a recovering post-punk rockstar recalling the peak of his manic fame in the grimy early 80s, and an investigative journalist named Sam, tracked down by a publisher to capitalise upon the rock star’s rumoured re-emergence by writing a book telling the story of his disappearance in-between’. Damon Fairclough, for Louder Than War, commented that ‘the plot throws Forbes into a mission to track down one of the most enigmatic frontmen of the eighties…who apparently led his group from Top of the Pops to global success before vanishing from the face of the earth.’

== Themes ==
For the Glasgow Review of Books, Laura Waddell commented that ‘Mankowski’s novel is about the pitfalls of externally defined identity; the inability to find meaning and purpose on an individual or societal level results in an attachment to mere symbols of existence. One ill-fitting mode of living is replaced by another, successfully portrayed as shallow and unsatisfying, just tipping over the edge of not quite right or real enough,’ adding that ‘Wardner’s organic choice to check out from these options altogether – how he left the national grid – is the closest he comes to contentment and self knowledge.’

But Louder Than War argued that "this intriguing novel is more about the pop fan’s urge to remember, to hold on to the magic of lost soundtracks and the moments to which they’re attached." The Huffington Post also focused upon the books nostalgic element, writing "Mankowski transports us back to a world of smouldering band managers, corpulent record executives and, of course, the ‘girl next door’ who writes a journal, reads Satre and listens to The Cure. It is a world Mankowski clearly relishes - a bygone era in the 70's, 80's and 90's when people ran fanclubs, wrote fanzines and edited fan-forums to honour their stars and forge friendships."

Northern Soul also focused upon the significance of the era portrayed in the book as ‘a time, a sound, and a culture which never really seems to have left many of us, and it speaks directly to, and for, subsequent generations in yet another time of Conservative rule, high unemployment and increasing alienation from a digital world.
