= Heartbreak (band) =

- Origin: London, England
- Genres: Italo disco, EDM, synth-pop
- Label: Lex Records
- Members: Ali Renault; Sebastian Muravchix
- Website: Heartbreak's Myspace

Heartbreak are a London-based electronic music duo composed of Ali Renault and Sebastian Muravchix. Their music finds its strength through a juxtapose of Renault and Muravchix's respective background in electro and Italo disco.

== Albums ==
Heartbreak's debut album Lies was released on the 29 September 2008 on the London label Lex Records. Resident Advisor drew comparisons to 1980s acts such as OMD and Baltimora.

In honor of their inclusion in the NME Radar Tour, Heartbreak compiled a free mixtape available for download. The mixtape featured the likes of the Horrors, Deux and Lucy Montenegro, and was available to listen to online.

The album received mostly positive reviews and was ranked at number 50 on NME's Top 50 Albums of 2008.

== Tours ==
Heartbreak played the 2009 Samsung NME Radar Tour alongside La Roux, Magistrates and the Chapman Family.
