= Self-fashioning =

Constructing one's public persona to reflect cultural standards

Self-fashioning, a term introduced in Stephen Greenblatt's 1980 book Renaissance Self-Fashioning: From More to Shakespeare, refers to the process of constructing one's identity and public persona to reflect a set of cultural standards or social codes. Greenblatt described the process in the Renaissance era where a noble man was instructed to dress in the finest clothing he could afford, to be well versed and educated in art, literature, sport, and other culturally determined noble exercises, and to generally comport himself in a self-conscious manner. A concern for one's outwardly projected image was reflected in the portraiture of the era.

== In Renaissance studies ==
According to Greenblatt, during the Renaissance the upper class practiced self-fashioning. Prescribed attire and behavior was created for the noblemen and women, and were represented through portraits. The ideological traits portraying masculinity were symbols of authority and power. Male rulers depicted themselves in armor or with weapons. The most important characteristic attributed to women was beauty. Beauty represents the concepts of purity, virtue and modesty. In portraits, women performed these traits through idealized features, fancy dresses, and elaborate jewelry. The iconography of portraits displays the gender-specific qualities prescribed during the Renaissance through visual devices.

The Book of the Courtier, by Baldassare Castiglione, is one of the first texts that depicted behaviors which individuals were expected to adopt in society. As an informal book of conduct, The Courtier included instructions on how people of the noble class were to dress and speak, as well as general rules of interaction to follow in social situations. In his article "The Semiotics of Masculinity in Renaissance England", David Kuchta discusses the role of The Courtier concerning its influence on the self-fashioning of Renaissance England. Men of the noble class were to "create" themselves as works of art, according to the conventions of dress and manner as set forth by the monarchs. Characteristics of this Renaissance self-fashioning involve the use of "feminine" aspects of dress and conduct. A man was to conduct and dress in a way that reflected his position in society. He was not supposed to act in an affected manner, but present naturalness and nonchalance, or sprezzatura. In addition to, The Courtier puts emphasis on the importance of not only trying to resemble one's master, but actually trying to transform himself into his master in a way that exercises sprezzatura. This presents a key theme in self-fashioning: the conscious effort to strive to imitate a praised model in society.

For women, one of the most popular figures to imitate was the Virgin Mary. Margaret R. Miles provides a thorough analysis of this influence-through-images of iconography and art in her article "The Virgin's One Bare Breast". The bare breast symbolized nourishment in a time of famine. Depicting the Virgin Mary nursing the infant Christ encouraged women to aspire to provide the same nourishment for their own families and community. Miles goes on to explain that, although women were encouraged to strive to emulate the many virtues of the Virgin, they must also be aware that one could never fully achieve such a standard. Similarly, men were taught that they should follow in the image of Christ, which was believed to be more attainable.

Greenblatt's theories are influenced by the French sociologist and historian Michel Foucault.

== In other fields ==
Self-fashioning has implications and applications outside of Renaissance studies. Waleska Schwandt applies the theory to Oscar Wilde in a chapter of the book The Importance of Reinventing Oscar: Versions of Wilde during the Last 100 Years.

Alvina E. Quintana uses the theory to analyze twentieth century Chicano literature. Chicano scholars have applied self-fashioning to the well-known epistolary, The Mixquiahuala Letters, by Chicana feminist, Ana Castillo.

Jack Chen applies the concept to the writings of Emperor Taizong in a book titled The Poetics of Sovereignty: On Emperor Taizong of the Tang Dynasty.

In International Perspectives on Theorizing Aspirations: Applying Bourdieu’s Tools, Guy Mankowski applies the theory to punk music where self-fashioning is re-appropriated as 'self-design.'
