= Magistrates (band) =

- Origin: Essex, England
- Genres: Indie rock
- Years active: 2006–2009, 2011-2014
- Label: XL Recordings
- Members: Paul Usher; Mark Brandon; Thom Galbally; Andy Grant
- Website: http://www.magistratesofficial.com/

Magistrates were a pop band hailing from South Woodham Ferrers in Essex, England.

== Members ==
Name	Instrument
Paul Usher	Vocals, Keyboard
Mark Brandon	Guitar
Marcus Avery	Bass
Andy Grant	Drums
Daniel Williams	Keyboards

== History ==
Paul and Mark played in various bands whilst growing up together, including performing under the name Echelon in 2006 with Andrew Grant. After a change to the current line-up and a change of name in mid-2007, Magistrates signed to XL Recordings in the June 2008. The band released two singles, "Make This Work" (August 2008) and "Heartbreak" (May 2009).

Magistrates played the 2009 Samsung NME Radar Tour alongside La Roux, Heartbreak and the Chapman Family.

Magistrates also played the HMV Forum, Kentish Town, London on 15 May 2009, as a support band for Friendly Fires alongside Wax Stag.

Magistrates supported Blur for two of their 2009 'comeback' gigs at the Cliffs Pavilion, Westcliff-on-Sea and (civic hall, Wolverhampton), and La Roux at Chinnerys, Southend-on-sea.

Magistrates also played a gig at Wakestock festival 2009, they were met by huge support from many fans there.

In August 2009, Magistrates performed a set at the Big Chill festival in Herefordshire as well as featuring on the Festival Republic stage at the Reading and Leeds festivals.

On 21 December 2009, Magistrates announced their split up via Twitter and Facebook.

On 11 February 2011, Magistrates announced via their Facebook page they would once again be making music.

Magistrates played their first gig after reforming at the Queen of Hoxton, London in August 2011. Shortly after this, the band made their first festival appearance in two years by supporting headliners Athlete at the Brownstock Festival. This also marked a rare appearance in their 'hometown' of South Woodham Ferrers, and were introduced onto the stage by Jon Morter.

Magistrates returned in 2013 with the singles "B.T.P.A" and "When We Are Apart".

The video for "When We Are Apart" was shot in East London and was directed by VH/Yes. The video uses stock footage from an '80s dating video re-edited to appear as though it is lip-synced.

In 2014, they released the album When We Are Apart. The band decided to split at the end of 2014. Paul is now a songwriter for many artists and Mark has his own project called Model Man.
