= Assetz Capital =

British loan company

Assetz Capital Limited
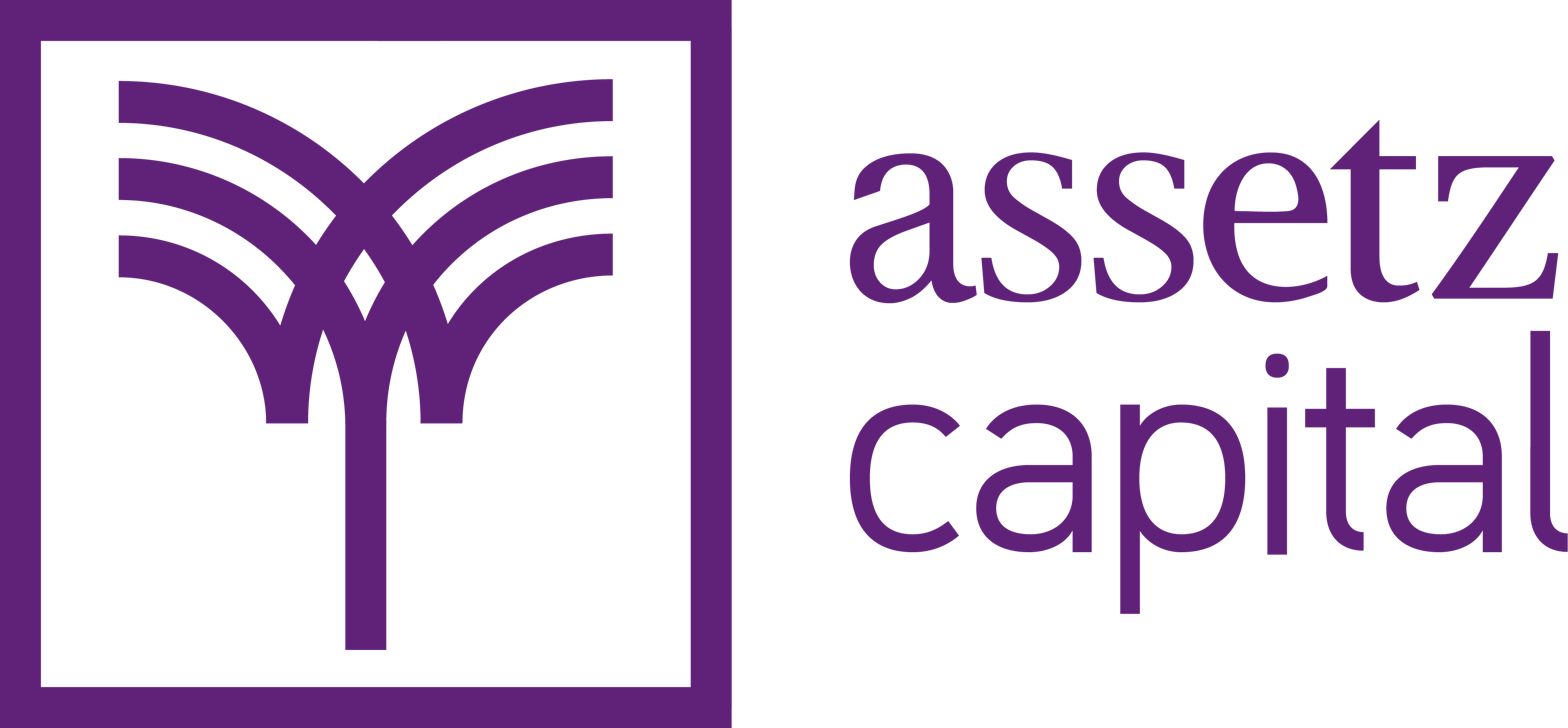
- Type: Limited
- Industry: Finance
- Founded: London, England (October 28, 2012)
- Headquarters: Manchester, Manchester, England
- Products: Property-secured business lending
- Services: Financial services
- Parent: Assetz Plc
- Divisions: Assetz SME Capital Ltd; Assetz Capital Ltd
- Website: www.assetzcapital.co.uk

Assetz Capital is a British company which makes property-secured loans to businesses. It was established in 2012 as a peer-to-peer or "marketplace" lender which allowed private and institutional investors to lend money directly to small businesses (SMEs) and property developers. In December 2022, it became solely funded by institutional capital for new lending.

== History ==
Assetz Capital was established as a secured P2P lender in the United Kingdom. The company, part of the wider Assetz group of companies founded by Stuart Law, was launched in March 2013.

In its first year of business the company lent over £19 million. AltFi.com recorded a lending growth rate for Assetz Capital of 300% pa in 2014. In January 2017, Assetz Capital announced it had lent over £200 million to British SMEs since launch.

In April 2013, Assetz Capital raised £1.5m for the largest peer-to-peer loan in the UK to date (the previous largest peer-to-peer loan was £500k). The loan was a first charge secured property development loan for a student accommodation project in Nottingham, with a 50% loan-to-value and a one-year term.

In May 2013, Assetz Capital became the first peer-to-peer lending company to launch peer-to-peer backed buy-to-let mortgages. In September 2013, Yahoo! Finance credited Assetz Capital as the fastest-growing peer-to-peer lending company in the UK.

In November 2014, Asset Capital passed £50m lent. In December 2014, Assetz Capital formed a joint venture with Interface Financial Group to supply single invoice discounting and spot factoring solutions to UK businesses.

In January 2015, Assetz Capital announced it had received a £150m funding line from Victory Park Capital to fund SME loans. The same month, Assetz Capital announced a partnership with Royal Bank of Scotland (RBS) whereby, if RBS is unable to help a business obtain the investment capital it requires, it will introduce Assetz Capital as a potential alternative source of funding.

In February 2015, Assetz Capital announced a fundraising campaign on crowdfunding site Seedrs, to raise £2m for business growth and development. The target was hit in one week and was increased to £3m, which formed part of a £6m total equity raise. In April 2015, Assetz Capital launched its first SIPP offering, allowing investors to share their P2P loans in their SIPP portfolio.

In March 2016, Assetz Capital announced it had facilitated £100m worth of loans to credit-worthy UK SMEs and its investors had earned a total of £10m gross. In June 2016, Assetz Capital partnered with broker platform FundBay.co.uk to introduce five new commercial mortgage products.

In January 2017, Assetz Capital announced a total of £200m worth of loans had been lent to small and medium-sized UK businesses since launching in 2013, with £105m in 2016 alone. As of this date, over £17m had been earned by investors, with interest rates of between 3.75% and 15% per annum.

In January 2020, Assetz Capital filed its first set of audited statutory accounts (audited by Kay Johnson Gee LLP, a local Manchester based firm), for the year ended 31 March 2019. Prior to this point, the company was filing unaudited small company accounts.

== Regions ==
Assetz Capital's headquarters are in Manchester. Assetz Capital has a nationwide network of Relationship Directors who help guide borrowers through the lending process.

== Risk and regulation ==
Like other peer-to-peer lending companies, if a borrower fails to repay a loan a lender risks losing all or part of their investment. Assetz Capital take asset security from the borrower to mitigate against loses to the lenders. It is important to differentiate between loan defaults and losses, the difference being the recovered capital via the security taken against the loan when it was first extended. Assetz Capital uses a recoveries team to recover capital through security taken on a loan and is one of the few peer-to-peer lenders to take tangible security.

In December 2012, HM Treasury announced the start of a consultation period to regulate the peer-to-peer industry and in April 2013 Assetz Capital and the other leading peer-to-peer lenders obtained interim permissions from the Financial Conduct Authority (FCA). Assetz Capital received full FCA authorisation in September 2017.

== Returns ==
Advertised returns in 2017 were 3.75% to 15% gross but will vary from lender to lender. These returns are subject to taxation and losses arising from defaults.

== Investment accounts ==
Assetz Capital has a number of investment accounts. Target rates of interest vary based on the types of loans they invest in, security types, diversification of the investment, ease of access to funds in normal market conditions, and any additional cover such as a provision fund.

- The Manual Loan Investment Account
- The Green Energy Income Account allowed lenders to invest in a range of renewable energy projects through automatic diversification of funds across multiple loans. Many of the green energy projects on the platform also benefitted from government subsidies such as Feed-in Tariffs. The account offered investors a capped interest rate of 7% per annum. In December 2017, Assetz Capital announced that it was temporarily suspending new investments into the Green Energy Income account. In May 2018, Assetz Capital announced that it had decided to permanently close the Green Energy Income Account to new investment, attributing this decision to lack of new loan origination.
- In August 2015, Assetz Capital launched its Great British Business Account, focusing on small and medium-sized business loans.
- The Quick Access Account, with a capped variable interest rate and automatic investment.
- Assetz Capital's 30-Day Access Account.
- 90-Day Access Account (launched in February 2019). The 90-Day Account attracted investment capital of more than £10,000,000 (ten million pounds) in the first week it was available for investment

== Awards and commendations ==
Assetz Capital has won a number of awards since launch, including:

- Best Financial Startup – Financial World Innovation Awards 2014
- Best P2P Lender – Credit Awards 2016
- In August 2016, Assetz Capital received a five-star rating in the first "Loan Based Crowdfunding" analysis by financial sector analyst Defaqto.
- Best Easy Access Peer to Peer Provider – MoneyNet Awards 2017
