= Guy Mankowski =

English writer and lecturer (born 1983)

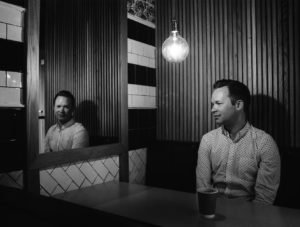
- Born: Guy Stanley Mankowski c.1983 (age 42–43); Isle of Wight, England
- Education: University of Durham, University of Newcastle, University of Northumbria
- Occupations: Writer; academic; journalist; psychologist; singer
- Writing career
- Period: 2011–present
- Notable works: How I Left The National Grid, Letters from Yelena
- Notable awards: Arts Council Literature Award, New Writing North Read Regional title

Academic background
- Thesis: 'How I Left The National Grid': A Creative Writing PhD on Self-Design and Post Punk (2015)
- Doctoral advisor: Andrew Crumey

Guy Mankowski FHEA (born 6 January 1983) is an English writer.

== Early life ==
He was educated at St John's College, Portsmouth and Ampleforth College. He read Applied Psychology at Durham University and gained a Masters in Psychology at Newcastle University. He trained as an assistant psychologist at The Royal Hospital in London.

== Career ==
His first novel, The Intimates, was a Recommended Title for New Writing North's 2011 Read Regional Campaign. Culture Magazine called it 'unusually stylised for contemporary fiction.'

Mankowski's second novel, Letters from Yelena, was described by New Books Magazine as having 'shades of The Red Shoes and The Black Swan.' The novel was given Arts Council funding, allowing Mankowski to be ‘given access to observe the work of the Vaganova Academy of Russian Ballet’ in Saint Petersburg for research purposes’. The choreographer Dora Frankel created a dance based on the book. An excerpt of the novel was used as GCSE training material by Osiris Educational. His third novel, How I Left The National Grid, was written as part of his PhD. His academic research applied the theory of Self-fashioning to the punk movement, re-appropriating it as 'self-design'. The book was discussed on the North East Arts and Culture Show. Of the novel, The Huffington Post stated the book captures 'the psychology of fan obsession.' The Glasgow Review Of Books described it as a novel 'about the pitfalls of externally defined identity...the theme is spread widely, but slightly thinly, with variance in how well fleshed [characters] are.' Louder Than War said the novel 'is more about the pop fan's urge to remember.' In 2015 he also edited the memoir of banking whistle-blower Paul Moore (banking manager). An Honest Deceit was a New Writing North Read Regional 2018 title.

"Dead Rock Stars" concerns the wild summer of a teenage boy struggling to get over the death of his sister. Louder Than War (website) called it 'fiction that uses alternative pop music as [its] guiding light.' 'Albion's Secret History: Snapshots of England's Pop Rebels and Outsiders' was reviewed by PopMatters, who wrote 'this book is about celebrating the unsung.' Midwest Book Review said, 'Mankowski looks at those who have really shaped Albion's secret history, not just its oft-quoted official cultural history.' Mankowski did a TEDx talk on his opening of the unseen archive of Kristen Pfaff of Hole (band). Mankowski told No Treble magazine, 'Jason Pfaff offered to share with me his sister’s unopened archive.' His biography of Kristen Pfaff was published in two volumes on Substack in 2024 and 2025 and examines the final hours of her life. Excerpts were published by 3:AM Magazine and No Treble magazine. Mankowski is a Senior Lecturer in Creative Writing at the University of Lincoln.

== Publications ==
=== Novels ===
- The Intimates (Legend Press) ISBN 978-1-907756-46-7 March 2011.
- Letters from Yelena (Legend Press) ISBN 978-1-909039-10-0 October 2012.
- How I Left The National Grid (Collective Ink) ISBN 178279896X February 2015.
- An Honest Deceit (Urbane Publications) ISBN 978-1911129974 October 2016, 2nd Ed., 2018.
- "Dead Rock Stars" (Darkstroke) ISBN 979-8667780991 September 2020.
- You Complete The Masterpiece (Collective Ink) ISBN 978-1-80341-661-8 November 2024.

=== Biographies ===
- 'I Know How To Live': The Life of Kristen Pfaff (Substack) Volume 1; 10th December 2024, Volume 2; 16th August 2025.

=== Non-fiction ===
- Albion's Secret History (Zer0 Books, Collective Ink) ISBN 978-1-78904-028-9 March 2021.

=== Audiobooks ===
- An Honest Deceit via Audible, narrated by Chris Reilly, March 2017.

=== Speaking engagements ===
A 2022 TEDx talk entitled "Lived Through This: Kristen Pfaff's hidden archive and influence."

At the 2026 'KISMIF' conference, University of Porto, a paper entitled "Kristen Pfaff (Hole): A Biographers Excavation of Her Activism at University of Minnesota: From the Nineties To Now’."

A 2026 ‘Crime Scenes of Tinseltown’ episode entitled "The Shadow Self: Writing The Shining - Psychology, Trauma and Terror | Crime Scenes of Tinseltown."

=== Anthologies ===
- A Body of Strangers in Eight Rooms: Short Story Reinvented (Legend Press) ISBN 1906558094, November 2009.
- The Willows in Ten Journeys (Legend Press) ISBN 1906558191, April 2010.
- Queens of the Guestlist in Radgepacket- Tales From The Inner Cities Volume 4 (Byker Books) ISBN 0956078850, March 2010.
- Roses For Edie in Melodramatic Mayhem and Many Murderous Mishaps (Spectral Visions Press) ISBN 1702363554, October 2019.
- The Ghosts Of Her Dead Husband's Fiction in 'Uncommonalities Volume II: Bad Enough' (Bratum Books) ISBN 1838173706, September 2020.
- Cutting in 'Uncommonalities Volume IV: Eventually' (Bratum Books) ISBN 978-1838173753, April 2023.

=== Short stories ===
- The Dagenham Dolls (Structo, 2009).
- The Insiders Party (Litro, 2009).
- A Girl Named Grape (The View From Here, 2010).

=== PhD ===
- "'How I left the National Grid' : a creative writing PhD on self-design and post punk" (Northumbria University, 2015),

=== Academic articles ===
- I Can't Seem To Stay A Fixed Ideal: Self-design and self-harm in subcultures in Punk & Post Punk, Intellect Books, Vol. 2.3, ISSN 2044-1983, February 2014.
- Pop manifestos and nosebleed art rock: What have post-punk bands achieved? in Punk & Post Punk, Intellect Books, Vol. 3.2, ISSN 2044-1983, October 2014.
- 'Be Pure, Be Vigilant, Behave'. What Did Post Punk Manifestos Aim To Achieve? in Postgraduate Voices in Punk Studies: Your Wisdom, Our Youth, Cambridge Scholars Publishing, ISBN 978-1-4438-8168-5, 2017.
- 'A Series of Images / Against You And Me'- Richey Edwards' Portrayal Of The Body in 'Journal For Plague Lovers in Punk & Post Punk, Intellect Books, Vol. 10.1, ISSN 2044-1983, 2020.

=== Editing ===
- Crash, Bank, Wallop: The Story Of The HBOS Whistleblower by Paul Moore (New Wilberforce Media) ISBN 0993451802, November 2015.
