= Echelon (board game) =

1989 board game

Echelon is a board game published in 1989 by The Great Games Company.

== Contents ==
Echelon is a game in which a quiz game for 2-6 players has the central theme as literature.

== Reception ==
John Humphries reviewed Echelon for Games International magazine, and gave it 4 1/2 stars out of 5, and stated that "Echelon is a well constructed game with first class presentation and is great fun to play. As with most such games, the more players the merrier."
