= Echelon (band) =

- Origin: South Woodham Ferrers, UK
- Genres: Indie, Alternative rock,
- Years active: 2001–2006
- Label: Poptones
- Members: Paul Usher (Vocals/Keys); Mark Brandon (Guitar); Owain North (Bass); Andrew Grant (Drums)

Echelon were a four-piece band hailing from Essex, England.

== Biography ==
Guitarist Mark Brandon, bassist Owain North and vocalist Paul Usher met at an early age and played together in various lineups, however became serious about a career as a band following the recruitment of drummer Andrew Grant. Following a series of local gigs, the band caught the ear of Alan McGee in early 2004 who would subsequently sign the band to his Poptones label later that year.

The band gained momentum, supporting bands such as The Others and The Boxer Rebellion and doing their own headline tour surrounding the release of their first single, "Plus". The single received airplay from renowned DJs such as Steve Lamacq and Tom Robinson, who made it single of the week on his BBC Radio 6 Music evening show. The single also received airplay from XFM where the band did a live session. The debut single Plus was released on 8 November to positive reviews, and charted at Number 57 in the UK Singles Chart.

Cited as the 'kid brothers' of Radiohead, Echelon moved into 2005 touring consistently and recording the follow-up to "Plus" and filming the corresponding video. After an appearance at Glastonbury the delayed follow up single "Windows Shut" / "This Room" (a double A-Side) was released on 17 October. Although appreciated by Radio One DJ Zane Lowe the single failed to match the airplay of the debut, reaching number 12 in the UK Indie Chart.

Echelon finished in 2006, briefly reforming as Mixed Business before Usher, Grant, and Brandon formed a new band called Magistrates.

== Discography ==
- "Plus" – UK No. 57, UK Indie Chart No. 7
- "Windows Shut" / "This Room" UK No. 82, UK Indie Chart No. 12
