= Legend Press =

British book publisher

Legend Press is an independent British book publisher founded in 2005 by Tom Chalmers, specialising in original fiction, crime thrillers, and a Legend Classics series. In 2011, they were shortlisted for the Independent Publisher of the Year and their books have been longlisted and shortlisted for prizes including the Baileys Women's Prize for Fiction, Dylan Thomas Young Writer Prize, Historical Writers Awards and Costa Book Awards.

Legend Press is based in London and is part of the Legend Times Group. The company has built a global sales and distribution network with the target of reaching readers in multiple formats across the world. In 2022 it moved its distribution to Macmillan Distribution

In 2023 Legend Press announced a partnership with South African publisher Blackbird Books, with the aim of helping bring more African literary voices to a UK audience.

== Founder ==
Tom Chalmers set-up Legend Press in 2005 aged 25 and have since expanded the company into the Legend Times group of publishing companies he has founded or acquired. In March 2007, founder and Managing Director Tom Chalmers was shortlisted for the inaugural UK Young Publisher of the Year Award.

In October 2007 Chalmers was shortlisted for the Young Entrepreneur of the Year Award. The annual award is part of the Real Business/CBI Growing Business Awards.
