= Romeo + Juliet (ballet) =

2007 ballet by Peter Martins

- Choreographer: Peter Martins
- Music: Sergei Prokofiev
- Premiere: May 1, 2007; New York State Theater, Lincoln Center
- Original ballet company: New York City Ballet
- Genre: Neoclassical ballet
- Type: Classical ballet

Romeo + Juliet is a ballet by New York City Ballet balletmaster-in-chief Peter Martins to Sergei Prokofiev's Romeo and Juliet (1934–1940). The premiere took place on Tuesday, 1 May 2007 at the New York State Theater, Lincoln Center.

== Casts ==
=== Original ===
Character	Actor	
Character	First cast	Second cast
Romeo	Robert Fairchild	Sean Suozzi
Juliet	Sterling Hyltin	Kathryn Morgan
Tybalt	Joaquín De Luz	Tyler Angle
Mercutio	Daniel Ulbricht	Andrew Veyette
Benvolio	Antonio Carmena	Austin Laurent
Juliet's Nurse	Georgina Pazcoguin	Dena Abergel
Paris	Jonathan Stafford	Adrian Danchig-Waring
Lady	Darci Kistler	Darci Kistler
Lord Capulet	Jock Soto	Jock Soto
Friar Laurence	Nikolaj Hübbe	Nikolaj Hübbe
Prince of Verona	Albert Evans	Albert Evans

=== NYCB revivals ===
Character	Actor		
Character	First cast	Second cast	Third cast
Romeo	Robert Fairchild	Allen Peiffer	Sean Suozzi
Juliet	Sterling Hyltin	Erica Pereira	Kathryn Morgan
Tybalt	Amar Ramasar	Giovanni Villalobos	Tyler Angle
Mercutio	Daniel Ulbricht	Adam Hendrickson	Andrew Veyette
Benvolio	Antonio Carmena	Adrian Danchig-Waring	Austin Laurent
Juliet's Nurse	Georgina Pazcoguin	Gwyneth Muller	Gwyneth Muller
Paris	Jonathan Stafford	Christian Tworzyanski	Christian Tworzyanski
Lady	Darci Kistler	Darci Kistler	Darci Kistler
Lord Capulet	Jock Soto	Jock Soto	Jock Soto
Friar Laurence	Nikolaj Hübbe	Nikolaj Hübbe	Jonathan Stafford
Prince of Verona	Albert Evans	Albert Evans	Albert Evans

=== 2009 Spring ===
Character	Actor	
Character	First cast	Second cast
Romeo	Robert Fairchild	Sean Suozzi
Juliet	Sterling Hyltin	Kathryn Morgan
Tybalt	Joaquín De Luz	Amar Ramasar
Mercutio	Daniel Ulbricht	Andrew Veyette
Benvolio	Antonio Carmena	Austin Laurent
Juliet's Nurse	Georgina Pazcoguin	Dena Abergel
Paris	Adrian Danchig-Waring	Adrian Danchig-Waring
Lady	Darci Kistler	Darci Kistler
Lord Capulet	Jock Soto	Jock Soto
Friar Laurence	Jonathan Stafford	Jonathan Stafford
Prince of Verona	Albert Evans	Albert Evans
