= Romeo + Juliet =

1996 film directed by Baz Luhrmann

William Shakespeare's Romeo + Juliet
- Theatrical release poster
- Directed by: Baz Luhrmann
- Screenplay by: Craig Pearce; Baz Luhrmann
- Based on: Romeo and Juliet; 1597 play by William Shakespeare
- Produced by: Baz Luhrmann; Gabriella Martinelli; Elsa Hermoso
- Starring: Leonardo DiCaprio; Claire Danes; Brian Dennehy; John Leguizamo; Pete Postlethwaite; Paul Sorvino; Diane Venora
- Cinematography: Donald M. McAlpine
- Edited by: Jill Bilcock
- Music by: Nellee Hooper; Marius de Vries; Craig Armstrong
- Production company: Bazmark Productions
- Distributed by: 20th Century Fox
- Release dates: 27 October 1996 (Mann's Chinese Theatre); 1 November 1996 (United States and Canada); 26 December 1996 (Australia)
- Running time: 120 minutes
- Countries: United States; Mexico; Australia; Canada
- Language: English
- Budget: $14.5 million
- Box office: $147.6 million

William Shakespeare's Romeo & Juliet (stylized as William Shakespeare's Romeo + Juliet) is a 1996 romantic crime film directed, produced, and co-written by Baz Luhrmann. It is a modernized adaptation of William Shakespeare's tragedy of the same name, albeit still using Shakespearean English. The film stars Leonardo DiCaprio and Claire Danes in the title roles of two teenagers who fall in love, despite their being members of feuding families. Brian Dennehy, John Leguizamo, Miriam Margolyes, Harold Perrineau, Pete Postlethwaite, Paul Sorvino and Diane Venora also star in supporting roles. It is the third major film version of the play, following adaptations by George Cukor in 1936 and by Franco Zeffirelli in 1968.

The film was released on November 1, 1996, by 20th Century Fox. It was met with generally positive reviews from critics and grossed over $147 million against its $14.5 million budget. At the 47th Berlin International Film Festival in 1997, DiCaprio won the Silver Bear for Best Actor and Luhrmann won the Alfred Bauer Prize. At the 69th Academy Awards, Catherine Martin and Brigitte Broch were nominated for Best Art Direction/Set Decoration. In 2005, the film was included on the BFI list of the "50 films you should watch by the age of 14".

The film was also re-released in Luhrmann's Red Curtain Trilogy DVD box set in 2002 together with Strictly Ballroom (1992) and Moulin Rouge! (2001).

== Plot ==
In Verona Beach, the Capulets and Montagues are two rival business empires. The animosity of the older generation—Fulgencio and Gloria Capulet and Ted and Caroline Montague—is felt by their younger relatives. A shootout occurs between Montague Benvolio, Romeo's cousin, and Capulet Tybalt, Juliet's cousin, creating chaos in the city. The Chief of Police, Captain Prince, arrests Benvolio and Tybalt before reprimanding the families, warning them that if such an event occurs again, their lives "shall pay the forfeit of the peace".

Benvolio and Romeo learn of a Capulet party that evening, which they decide to gate-crash. Romeo agrees on hearing that Rosaline, with whom he is madly in love, is attending. They meet their friend, Mercutio, who has tickets to the party, and Romeo takes ecstasy as they proceed to the Capulet mansion.

The effects of the drug and the party overwhelm Romeo, who goes to the restroom. There he sees and meets Juliet, and the two instantly fall in love, both unaware of who the other is. Tybalt spots Romeo and vows to kill him for trespassing into his family's home.

After Romeo leaves the party, he and Juliet each learn that they belong to the feuding families, but he returns to propose to her. She tells him that if he sends word by the following day, they will be betrothed. The next day, Romeo asks Father Laurence to marry them, and he agrees. Romeo passes the word on via Juliet's nurse, and they soon get married.

Tybalt encounters the Montagues and Mercutio at the beach. Romeo then comes and attempts to make peace, but Tybalt assaults him. Mercutio intervenes and batters Tybalt, and is about to kill him when Romeo stops him. Tybalt takes the opportunity to fatally wound Mercutio, who curses both houses before dying. Enraged, Romeo chases after the fleeing Tybalt and shoots him dead, avenging Mercutio's death.

Captain Prince banishes Romeo from the city, so he goes into hiding with Father Laurence. The nurse arrives and tells him that Juliet is waiting for him. Romeo climbs Juliet's balcony and they consummate their marriage, with him departing the next morning. Meanwhile, Fulgencio decides Juliet will marry Dave Paris, the governor's son.

The next morning, Gloria informs Juliet that she is to marry Paris at St. Peter's Church. When Juliet refuses, Fulgencio physically assaults her and threatens to disown her if she doesn't accept it. She runs away and seeks out Father Laurence, imploring him to help her, while threatening to commit suicide. He gives her a potion that will let her fake her own death, after which she will be placed within the Capulet vault to awaken 24 hours later.

Father Laurence vows to inform Romeo of the plot via overnight letter, whereupon the latter will sneak into the vault. Once reunited with Juliet, the two will escape to Mantua, the remote trailer park in the desert where Romeo has been hiding out. However, Romeo does not see the delivered letter so, believing Juliet to be dead, buys a vial of poison from an apothecary.

Romeo enters the church where Juliet lies and consumes the poison just as Juliet wakes up. Distraught over his death, she shoots herself in the head with his gun, falling down beside his lifeless body. As the bodies of both Romeo and Juliet are being loaded onto ambulances, the parents of both houses arrive at the scene. Captain Prince approaches their fathers, berating them both for the deaths of their children that their foolish feud has caused.

== Cast ==
The House of Montague

- Leonardo DiCaprio as Romeo Montague
- Brian Dennehy as Ted Montague, Romeo's father
- Christina Pickles as Caroline Montague, Romeo's mother
- Dash Mihok as Benvolio Montague, Romeo's cousin
- Jesse Bradford as Balthasar, Romeo's cousin
- Zak Orth as Gregory, Romeo's cousin
- Jamie Kennedy as Sampson, Romeo's cousin

The House of Capulet

- Claire Danes as Juliet Capulet
- Paul Sorvino as Fulgencio Capulet, Juliet's father
- Diane Venora as Gloria Capulet, Juliet's mother
- John Leguizamo as Tybalt, Juliet's cousin and the one who kills Mercutio
- Vincent Laresca as Abra, Juliet's cousin
- Carlos Martín Manzo Otálora as Petruchio, Juliet's cousin
- Miriam Margolyes as Nurse, Juliet's nanny

Others

- Harold Perrineau as Mercutio, Romeo's best friend
- Pete Postlethwaite as Father Laurence, the priest who conducts the marriage of Romeo and Juliet
- Paul Rudd as Dave Paris, the governor's son
- Vondie Curtis-Hall as Captain Prince, the chief of police
- M. Emmet Walsh as Apothecary
- Quindon Tarver as Choir Boy, the singer at Romeo and Juliet's wedding
- Edwina Moore as the anchorwoman / newsreader, who opens the movie, reading the prologue, and later assumes the role of the Chorus.

Natalie Portman had been cast as Juliet but, during rehearsals, it was thought that she looked too young for the part, and the footage looked as though DiCaprio was "molesting" her. Luhrmann stated that Portman was too young at the time, and made DiCaprio look older than intended. He was 21 at the time of filming and Portman was only 14.

After Sarah Michelle Gellar turned down the role due to scheduling conflicts, DiCaprio proclaimed that Danes should be cast, as he felt she was genuine in her line delivery and did not try to impress him by acting flirtatious.

Christian Bale read for the role of Mercutio, but Harold Perrineau was cast in the role.

== Differences between the film and the original play ==
While it retains the original Shakespearean dialogue, the film represents the Montagues and the Capulets as warring mafia empires (with legitimate business fronts) and the Capulets were "a Latin family, sort of", played by Latin-American and Italian actors. It is set in contemporary United States, where swords are replaced by guns (with model names such as "Dagger", "Sword", and "Rapier"), and with a FedEx-style overnight delivery service called "Post Haste".

Some characters' names are also changed: Paris, Lord and Lady Montague, and Lord and Lady Capulet are given first names (in the original, their first names are never mentioned); Friar Laurence becomes Father Laurence; and Prince Escalus is rewritten as the police chief of Verona Beach, being renamed Captain Prince.

The adaptation eliminates the character of Friar John, and some characters change families: in the original, Gregory and Sampson are Capulets, but in the film, they are Montagues; conversely, Abram, as Abra, is shifted from the Montague to the Capulet family.

== Production ==
The film was an international co-production involving principals from the United States, Mexico, Australia, and Canada. After the success of his earlier film Strictly Ballroom (1992), Baz Luhrmann took some time deciding on his next project:

"Our philosophy has always been that we think up what we need in our life, choose something creative that will make that life fulfilling, and then follow that road. With Romeo and Juliet what I wanted to do was to look at the way in which Shakespeare might make a movie of one of his plays if he was a director. How would he make it? We don't know a lot about Shakespeare, but we do know he would make a 'movie' movie. He was a player. We know about the Elizabethan stage and that he was playing for 3000 drunken punters, from the street sweeper to the Queen of England – and his competition was bear-baiting and prostitution. So he was a relentless entertainer and a user of incredible devices and theatrical tricks to ultimately create something of meaning and convey a story. That was what we wanted to do."

Luhrmann obtained some funds from Fox to do a workshop and shoot some teaser footage in Sydney. Leonardo DiCaprio agreed to pay his own expenses to fly to Sydney and be part of it. Once Fox saw footage of the fight scene, they agreed to support it.

All of the development was done in Australia, with pre-production in Australia and Canada and post-production in Australia. While some parts of the film were shot in Miami, most of the film was shot in Mexico City and Boca del Rio, Veracruz. For instance, the Capulet mansion was set at Chapultepec Castle, while the ballroom was built on Stage One of Churubusco Studios; the church exterior was the Templo del Purísimo Corazón de María ("Immaculate Heart of Mary") in the Del Valle neighborhood.

== Reception ==
=== Box office ===
The film premiered on November 1, 1996, in the United States and Canada, in 1,276 theaters, and grossed $11.1 million its opening weekend, ranking number one at the US box office. It went on to gross $46.3 million in the United States and Canada.

In Australia, the film opened on Boxing Day and was number one at the Australian box office with a gross of A$3.3 million (US$2.6 million) for the week. It remained number one for a second week and returned to the top in its fourth week. It was the ninth highest-grossing film in Australia for 1997 with a calendar year gross of A$12.9 million. Overall, it has grossed US$12.6 million in Australia and US$147,554,998 worldwide.

=== Critical response ===
Review aggregator Rotten Tomatoes reported 79% of 137 critics gave a positive review. The site's critics consensus reads, "Baz Luhrmann's visual aesthetic is as divisive as it is fresh and inventive." Metacritic gives the film a weighted average score of 60 out of 100 based on 20 critics, indicating "mixed or average reviews". Audiences polled by CinemaScore gave the film an average grade of "A−" on an A+ to F scale.

James Berardinelli gave the film three out of four stars and wrote, "Ultimately, no matter how many innovative and unconventional flourishes it applies, the success of any adaptation of a Shakespeare play is determined by two factors: the competence of the director and the ability of the main cast members. Luhrmann, Danes, and DiCaprio place this Romeo and Juliet in capable hands."

Conversely, Roger Ebert gave the film a mixed review of two out of four stars, writing: "I've seen King Lear as a samurai drama (Ran) and Macbeth as a Mafia story (Men of Respect), and two different Romeo and Juliets about ethnic difficulties in Manhattan (West Side Story and China Girl), but I have never seen anything remotely approaching the mess that the new punk version of Romeo & Juliet makes of Shakespeare's tragedy."[31]"

Some reviewers significantly revised their opinions of the film as time passed. For example, Stephanie Zacharek went from describing it as "destined for the trash heap of Shakespeare adaptations" in her original review in Salon, to writing "I Panned Romeo + Juliet in 1996. Now I Think It's One of the Best Shakespeare Adaptations" when revisiting the movie in her 25-year retrospective review for Time magazine.

=== Accolades ===
Romeo + Juliet competed for the Golden Bear at the 47th Berlin International Film Festival, winning the Alfred Bauer Prize for Luhrmann and the Silver Bear for Best Actor for DiCaprio. It received seven nominations at the 51st British Academy Film Awards and won in four categories, including Best Direction and Best Adapted Screenplay. The film received a single nomination for Best Art Direction at the 69th Academy Awards.

Other notable ceremonies where it received much recognition included audience oriented award shows, such as the Blockbuster Entertainment Awards, and the MTV Movie Awards.

Award	Category	Subject	Result	Ref.
Academy Awards	Best Art Direction	Art Direction: Catherine Martin; Set Decoration: Brigitte Broch	Nominated	
Australian Film Institute Awards	Best Foreign Film	Baz Luhrmann and Gabriella Martinelli	Nominated	
Berlin International Film Festival	Golden Bear	Baz Luhrmann	Nominated	
Berlin International Film Festival	Alfred Bauer Prize	Baz Luhrmann	Won	
Berlin International Film Festival	Silver Bear for Best Actor	Leonardo DiCaprio	Won	
Blockbuster Entertainment Awards	Favorite Actor – Romance	Leonardo DiCaprio	Won	
Blockbuster Entertainment Awards	Favorite Actress – Romance	Claire Danes	Won	
British Academy Film Awards	Best Direction	Baz Luhrmann	Won	
British Academy Film Awards	Best Adapted Screenplay	Baz Luhrmann and Craig Pearce	Won	
British Academy Film Awards	Best Cinematography	Donald McAlpine	Nominated	
British Academy Film Awards	Best Editing	Jill Bilcock	Nominated	
British Academy Film Awards	Best Original Film Music	Nellee Hooper, Craig Armstrong and Marius de Vries	Won	
British Academy Film Awards	Best Production Design	Catherine Martin	Won	
British Academy Film Awards	Best Sound	Gareth Vanderhope, Rob Young and Roger Savage	Nominated	
London Film Critics Circle Awards	Film of the Year	Romeo + Juliet	Nominated	
London Film Critics Circle Awards	Director of the Year	Baz Luhrmann	Nominated	
London Film Critics Circle Awards	Actress of the Year	Claire Danes	Won	
MTV Movie Awards	Best Movie	Romeo + Juliet	Nominated	
MTV Movie Awards	Best Male Performance	Leonardo DiCaprio	Nominated	
MTV Movie Awards	Best Female Performance	Claire Danes	Won	
MTV Movie Awards	Best Kiss	Claire Danes and Leonardo DiCaprio	Nominated	
MTV Movie Awards	Best On-Screen Duo	Claire Danes and Leonardo DiCaprio	Nominated	
MTV Movie Awards	Best Song from a Movie	"#1 Crush" by Garbage	Nominated	
Saturn Awards	Best Costume Design	Kym Barrett	Nominated	

American Film Institute recognition

- AFI's 100 Years ... 100 Passions – Nominated

=== Home media ===
The film was originally released on DVD on March 19, 2002, by 20th Century Fox Home Entertainment. A 10th anniversary special edition DVD containing extra features and commentary was released on February 6, 2007, and a Blu-ray edition was released on October 19, 2010.

=== Retrospective reviews ===
Despite its initially mixed reception, Romeo + Juliet has since become a cult classic.

The film maintains a popular reputation among English teachers, as a means through which to introduce secondary school students to the play. Although not to every critic's taste, the film is now recognised as one of the most influential Shakespeare film adaptations ever made.

Retrospective reviews are generally positive. While discussing Luhrmann's adaptation there are comments that include "... the most consistent source of delight in Luhrmann's movie: the way he sticks so close to Shakespeare yet manages to update the Bard's play so thoroughly" and lamenting the lack of Oscar success ("though it was sadly overlooked at the Academy Awards") and, in an updated review on RogerEbert.com a headline that comments how the film "is irreplaceable". The film's timelessness is another theme of these retrospective reviews, as is praise for the mix of modern images with traditional languages which challenged some early reviewers, leading to comments including "he proved you don't need to change the language to make Shakespeare accessible".

Miriam Margolyes, who played the nurse in the film, wrote about her experiences on the film in her 2021 memoir This Much Is True. On her co-star Leonardo DiCaprio, she wrote:

Leonardo has grown into an extremely fine actor but back then he was just a handsome boy who didn't always wash; he was quite smelly in that very male way some young men are. Sometimes he wore a dress. "Leonardo, I think you're gay," I said. He laughed and said, "No Miriam. I'm really not gay." But I was wrong. We filmed in Mexico City, paradise for someone like me who loves fossicking around flea markets and antiques shops, and, like me, Leonardo was into bling in a big way, too. We'd spend hours going through the markets together. I don't know that I've ever had such fun."

She further commented on the chemistry between the film's two leads:

I liked [DiCaprio] tremendously and admired his work, but luckily I was immune from his groin charms, unlike poor Claire Danes, then only 17. It was obvious to all of us that she really was in love with her Romeo, but Leonardo wasn't in love with her. She wasn't his type at all. He didn't know how to cope with her evident infatuation. He wasn't sensitive to her feelings, was dismissive of her and could be quite nasty in his keenness to get away, while Claire was utterly sincere and so open. It was painful to watch. Many years later, I was in a restaurant and she came up to me and said: "We worked together on a film once, I don't know if you remember me? My name is Claire Danes." It was the opposite of the arrogant behaviour of some stars and so typical of her.

== Soundtrack ==
1. "#1 Crush" – Garbage
2. "Local God" – Everclear
3. "Angel" – Gavin Friday
4. "Pretty Piece of Flesh" – One Inch Punch
5. "Kissing You (Love Theme from Romeo & Juliet)" – Des'ree
6. "Whatever (I Had a Dream)" – Butthole Surfers
7. "Lovefool" – The Cardigans
8. "Young Hearts Run Free" – Kym Mazelle
9. "Everybody's Free (To Feel Good)" – Quindon Tarver
10. "To You I Bestow" – Mundy
11. "Talk Show Host" – Radiohead
12. "Little Star" – Stina Nordenstam
13. "You and Me Song" – The Wannadies
