= Romeo & Juliet (2013 film) =

2013 film by Carlo Carlei

- U.S. theatrical poster
- Directed by: Carlo Carlei
- Screenplay by: Julian Fellowes
- Based on: Romeo and Juliet; 1597 play by William Shakespeare
- Produced by: Ileen Maisel; Nadja Swarovski; Julian Fellowes
- Starring: Hailee Steinfeld; Douglas Booth; Damian Lewis; Kodi Smit-McPhee; Ed Westwick; Paul Giamatti
- Cinematography: David Tattersall
- Edited by: Peter Honess
- Music by: Abel Korzeniowski
- Production companies: Amber Entertainment; Echo Lake Entertainment; Swarovski Entertainment
- Distributed by: Entertainment Film Distributors (United Kingdom); Good Films (Italy); Relativity Media (United States)
- Release dates: 11 October 2013 (United Kingdom and United States); 12 February 2015 (Italy)
- Running time: 118 minutes
- Countries: United Kingdom; Italy; United States
- Language: English
- Box office: $3 million

Romeo & Juliet is a 2013 film adaptation of William Shakespeare's romantic tragedy. Written by Julian Fellowes and directed by Carlo Carlei, it stars Hailee Steinfeld, Douglas Booth, Damian Lewis, Kodi Smit-McPhee, Ed Westwick, Stellan Skarsgård and Paul Giamatti. The film opened in the United Kingdom and the United States on 11 October 2013 and in Italy on 12 February 2015. While remaining faithful to the original plot, it uses only some of the dialogue written by Shakespeare. This has led to several critics denouncing the film on the grounds that it loses the essence of the play. The film grossed $3 million.

== Plot ==
During the late Middle Ages in Verona, two wealthy families, the Montagues and Capulets, have been feuding for centuries. One day at the marketplace, they start a brawl, which infuriates the Prince. He threatens that if the peace is disturbed again, he shall take their lives. Meanwhile, Romeo Montague reveals that he is in love with Lord Capulet's niece, Rosaline Capulet. Romeo's cousin, Benvolio Montague urges him to forget her, but Romeo rebuffs him.

That night, Romeo sneaks into a party at the Capulets' with Benvolio and his friend, Mercutio, hoping to see Rosaline. Instead, Romeo sees Juliet Capulet and falls in love with her. Juliet feels the same. They share a dance, then find a quiet place and share a passionate kiss. Juliet's Nurse interrupts them and when Romeo talks to her, he learns that Juliet is Lord Capulet's daughter.

After the party, Romeo sneaks into Juliet's garden and hears Juliet expressing her love for him. He climbs the balcony and they agree to get married the next day. Romeo seeks help from Friar Laurence. The Friar agrees to marry them, hoping their union may end the feud between the families. After the ceremony, Juliet returns home. Romeo catches up with Mercutio and Benvolio, but they meet Juliet's cousin, Tybalt and his men. In the ensuing fight, Tybalt fatally stabs Mercutio. Romeo runs after Tybalt seeking revenge and kills him. As a result, the Prince banishes Romeo from Verona.

The Friar sends Romeo to Juliet and they consummate their marriage, but Romeo has to leave in haste the next morning. Juliet is told by her father that she will marry Count Paris to raise her family's prestige. When she protests, he says that he will disown her if she does not obey. She seeks Friar Laurence's help, threatening to kill herself if he does not have a solution. The Friar gives her a potion that will put her into a death-like sleep until Romeo can come and rescue her. They can then run away together to Mantua. The Friar writes a letter to Romeo, informing him of the plan.

Juliet drinks the potion that night. Her parents find her the next morning, apparently dead and her funeral is arranged. Learning of her death, Benvolio hastens to tell Romeo.

Meanwhile, the Friar's letter has not reached Romeo, so Romeo believes Benvolio's news. Romeo buys poison and goes to Juliet's resting place, intending to take his own life. Paris, having come to mourn Juliet, confronts Romeo and is killed. Romeo kisses Juliet one last time, then drinks the poison, unaware that Juliet has awakened. Juliet is overjoyed to see him, and they kiss but Romeo suddenly collapses and dies in her arms. The Friar arrives to find a heartbroken Juliet weeping over Romeo's dead body. He hears some guards coming and leaves to hold them off, trying to persuade Juliet to come with him, without success. When Juliet hears the approaching watchmen, she finds Romeo's dagger and stabs herself in the heart. The Friar returns to find both of them dead.

At Juliet and Romeo's joint funeral, the Capulets and Montagues finally reconcile, ending their feud forever. During the procession, Benvolio steps forward, and joins both Juliet and Romeo's hands.

== Cast ==
- Douglas Booth as Romeo Montague
- Hailee Steinfeld as Juliet Capulet
- Damian Lewis as Lord Capulet
- Natascha McElhone as Lady Capulet
- Ed Westwick as Tybalt
- Nathalie Rapti Gomez as Rosaline Capulet
- Lesley Manville as Nurse
- Tom Wisdom as Count Paris
- Tomas Arana as Lord Montague
- Laura Morante as Lady Montague
- Kodi Smit-McPhee as Benvolio Montague
- Christian Cooke as Mercutio
- Anton Alexander as Abraham
- Paul Giamatti as Friar Lawrence
- Stellan Skarsgård as Prince Escalus of Verona
- Leon Vitali as Apothecary
- Simona Caparrini as female guest

== Production ==
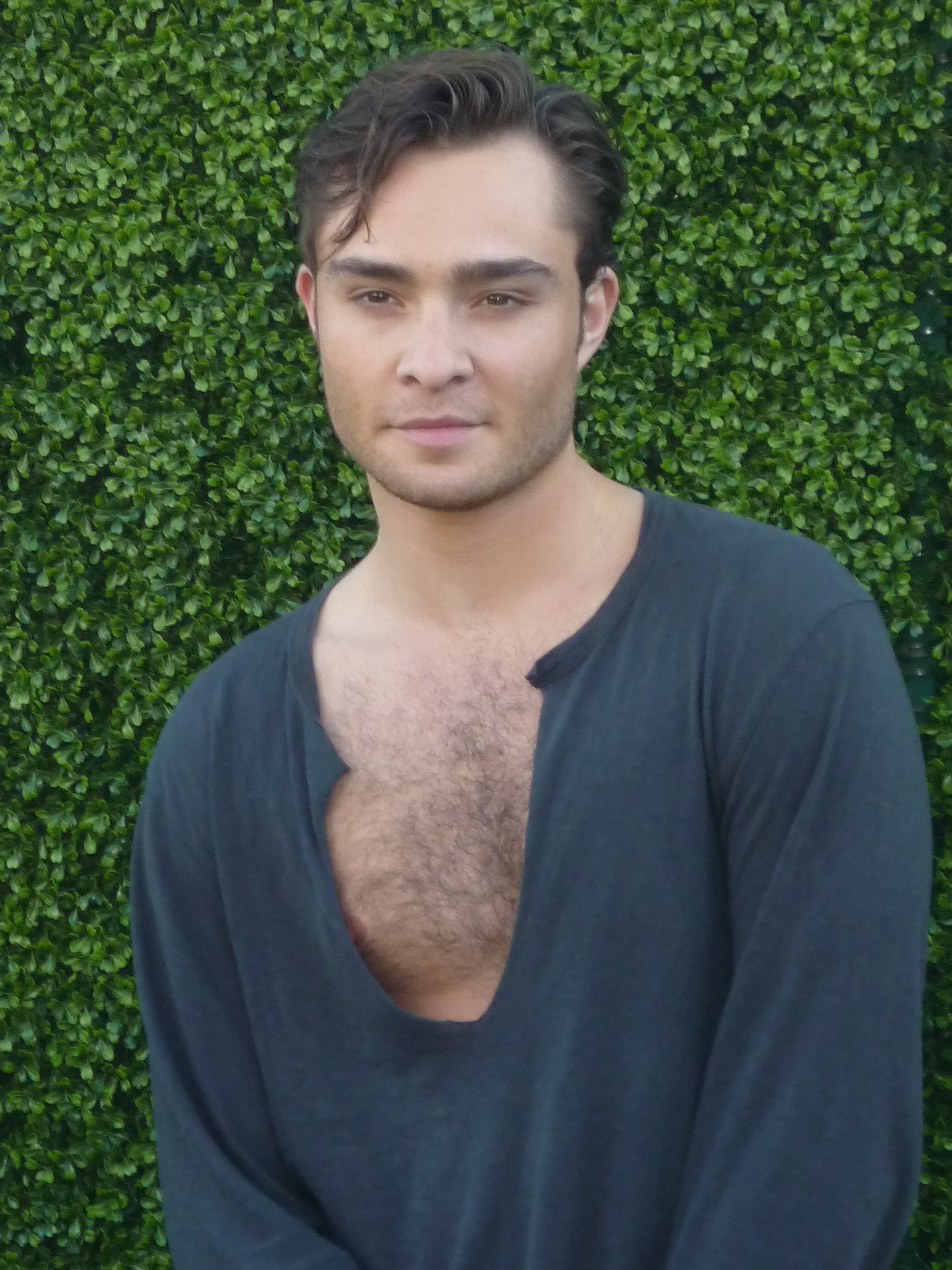
Ed Westwick played Tybalt in the film

Ed Westwick was the first actor to read the script. In April 2011, Hailee Steinfeld was said to be in talks for the lead role as Juliet. Owing to Steinfeld's age, changes had to be made. Director Carlo Carlei explained, "There was a lovemaking scene that included nudity for the married Romeo and Juliet. This script was written with a 20-year-old actress in mind. As soon as Hailee Steinfeld was cast, all nudity and lovemaking were excised from the script. It will be romantic and age-appropriate for a 14-year-old." In June 2011 Douglas Booth was cast as Romeo, beating 300 other actors. Paul Wesley had been offered the role of Count Paris, but it was announced in February 2012 that Tom Wisdom would play him.

Principal photography started on 3 February 2012 in Italy. The film was shot in various locations in Italy, including the Villa Farnese, Caprarola (not at the main villa, which is a museum, but at the "Casino" or "Casina del piacere" in the gardens). The loggia of the casino served as Juliet's balcony. Its columns were decorated with artificial greenery and roses on supports which Romeo used to climb up. The casina's southern garden staircase with water cascade (catena d'acqua) and fountain at the bottom were used in the scene of Romeo and Juliet's separation at dawn. The monastery scenes were filmed at the Monastery of San Benedetto. Other scenes were shot in Mantua, at Cinecittà, and in Verona. The first pictures of the set were posted on the website of the Italian newspaper Gazzetta di Mantova on 14 February 2012.

In May 2012 while during production, Austrian Jewellery company Swarovski joined the 2013 adaptation of the movie as its launched its production arm Swarovski Entertainment and would serve as production company of the 2013 adaptation.

== Release ==
=== Theatrical release and premiere ===
Relativity Media was paid for by the producers to release the movie in North America on 11 October 2013, while the film was released through D Films in Canada on the same date. The premiere was held in Hollywood on 24 September 2013 at the ArcLight Hollywood. It was released in Australia on 13 February 2014.

=== Home media ===
20th Century Fox Home Entertainment released the film on DVD and Blu-ray on 4 February 2014.

== Reception ==
=== Critical reception ===
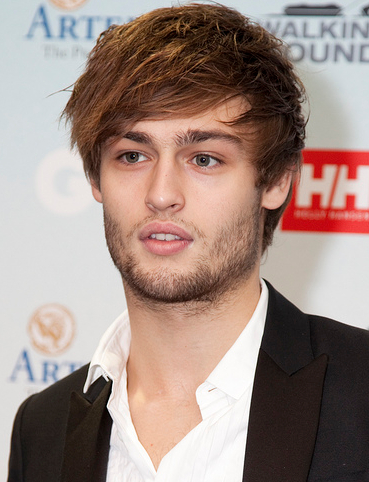
Douglas Booth

The film holds a 25% approval rating and an average score of 4.6/10 on aggregate review site Rotten Tomatoes based on 89 reviews; the consensus reads: "Shakespeare's classic romance gets a so-so adaptation that's short on passion and energy." The film has a 41 out of 100 rating on Metacritic based on 30 reviews, indicating "mixed or average reviews".

=== Accolades ===
Romeo & Juliet was nominated at the Golden Trailer Awards for Best Romantic Poster, and won International Film Music Critics Association Award for Film Score of the Year.

== Soundtrack ==
- L'Amor Dona Ch'Io Te Porto Anonymous, late 15th Century - Performed by Ensemble La Rossignol
- Tourdion (Pierre Attaignant) - Performed by Ensemble La Rossignol
- Skin - Written and Performed by Zola Jesus
