= Lady Montague =

Lady Montague may refer to:

- Lady Mary Wortley Montagu (1689–1762), English poet
- Lady Montague, a character in Shakespeare's Romeo and Juliet (1597)
