= A plague o' both your houses! =

Catchphrase from Romeo and Juliet

The Death of Mercutio
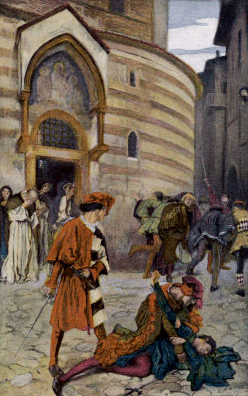
- Artist: Edwin Austin Abbey
- Year: 1902
- Type: Paper
- Medium: Gouache
- Dimensions: 70 cm × 45 cm (28 in × 18 in)
- Location: Yale University Art Gallery, New Haven

A plague o' both your houses! is a catchphrase from William Shakespeare's tragedy Romeo and Juliet. The phrase is used to express irritation and irony regarding a dispute or conflict between two parties. It is considered one of the most famous expressions attributed to Shakespeare.

== Context ==
The phrase is spoken in Act 3, Scene 1 of the tragedy.

Tybalt, a kinsman of the Capulets and cousin to Juliet, is dueling with Mercutio, a friend of Romeo from the Montague family. Romeo and Benvolio attempt to break up the fight. Mercutio, distracted, does not see his opponent and is fatally wounded by Tybalt under Romeo's arm.

Feeling his death approaching, Mercutio declares:

MERCUTIO:
A plague o' both your houses!
They have made worms' meat of me: I have it,
And soundly too: your houses!

Mercutio, dying, repeats the phrase "A plague o' both your houses!" three times. This triple curse, directed at the Montague and Capulet houses, almost literally comes true. Due to an unfortunate coincidence – a plague quarantine imposed by the city guards – Friar John is unable to deliver a letter informing the exiled Romeo that Juliet is not dead but asleep. As a result, both Romeo and Juliet perish.

== Variants of the original phrase ==
In the first printed edition of Romeo and Juliet (the so-called "First Quarto" or "Bad Quarto", published in 1597), Mercutio called down syphilis (pox) instead of plague (plague).

There are also well-founded doubts that in early editions, syphilis was indeed mentioned. Shakespeare may have used the word pox to mean not syphilis but smallpox. In Shakespeare's time, neither syphilis nor smallpox were necessarily fatal diseases, so Shakespeare might have replaced the initially milder curse with a more radical one.

== In culture ==
- In 1994, Russian playwright Grigory Gorin wrote the play A Plague on Both Your Houses!, which continues the plot of Shakespeare's Romeo and Juliet.
- A Plague on Both Your Houses is a 1996 detective novel by British author Susanna Gregory.
- Salman Rushdie uses the line "A plague on both your houses" as an epigraph in his novel Shalimar the Clown.

== See also ==
- List of idioms attributed to Shakespeare

== Literature ==
- William Shakespeare (1900). "Scene I. A public place.". In Edward Dowden (ed.). The Tragedy of Romeo and Juliet. London: Methuen & Co.
- Rebecca Totaro, Ernest B. Gilman (2010). "A plague on both your houses": Sites of Comfort and Terror in Early Modern Drama. Vol. 14. Taylor & Francis. p. 284. ISBN 978-0-415-87797-8.
- Elizabeth Webber, Mike Feinsilber (1999). Merriam-Webster's Dictionary of Allusions. Merriam-Webster. p. 423. ISBN 0-87779-628-9.
- Alexander Schmidt (1971). Gregor Sarrazin (ed.). Shakespeare Lexicon and Quotation Dictionary. Vol. 2 (3rd ed.). NY: Dover Publication Inc. p. 736. ISBN 0-486-22727-8.
