= Georgina Pazcoguin =

American ballet dancer

- Born: 1984 or 1985 (age 40–41); Altoona, Pennsylvania, US
- Education: School of American Ballet
- Occupation: Ballet dancer
- Employer: New York City Ballet
- Website: georginapazcoguin.com

Georgina Pazcoguin is an American ballerina. She was a soloist with the New York City Ballet, and is known for challenging racism in ballet, and for performing on Broadway.

== Early life ==
Pazcoguin was born and raised in Altoona, Pennsylvania. She is biracial; her father is a retired surgeon who immigrated from the Philippines after medical school, and her mother is Italian. The third of six siblings, she began training at the Allegheny Ballet Academy when she was four years old in ballet, African, tap and jazz. She moved to New York City to train at the School of American Ballet, the associate school of New York City Ballet (NYCB) at the age of 16 in 2001 while also studying at the Professional Children's School.

== Ballet ==
After one year of studying at SAB, Pazcoguin was invited by Peter Martins to join NYCB as an apprentice. The following year she became a member of the company's corps de ballet. After 10 years of dancing featured and principal roles, she was promoted to soloist in 2013, making her the first Asian American female soloist in NYCB's history.

With NYCB, Pazcoguin performed featured roles in the original productions of Romeo + Juliet (as the Nurse, 2007), Douglas Lee's Lifecasting (2009), Ocean's Kingdom (as Scala, 2011), Alexei Ratmansky's Voices and Russians Seasons, Lauren Lovette's The Shaded Line, Angelin Preljocaj's Spectral Evidence, and Kyle Abraham's The Runway. She has also had featured roles in numerous NYCB revivals, including George Balanchine's The Nutcracker (as Dewdrop), Scotch Symphony, Balanchine's A Midsummer Night's Dream (as Hippolyta), Peter Martins' The Sleeping Beauty (as Carabosse), and Jerome Robbins' West Side Story Suite (as Anita).

She is especially noted for her portrayal of Anita, which she first performed during NYCB's 2008 American Songs and Dances program. She has also appeared on film in the 2010 film adaptation of another famous Jerome Robbins ballet, N.Y. Export: Op. Jazz, which was directed by Jody Lee Lipes and Henry Joost.

Pazcoguin retired from NYCB in May 2023 after final performances of Namouna.

=== Branding and advocacy ===
Pazcoguin considers herself the "complete antithesis" of the stereotypical ballet dancer. During her early days at NYCB, she struggled with body image issues, noting in a 2013 interview with Time Out New York that she "will never be that super, super thin, skeletal [dancer]". She has since styled herself as "The Rogue Ballerina" as a means of embracing the qualities that make her stick out as a dancer, such as her body type and ethnicity. Pazcoguin's memoir, Swan Dive: The Making of a Rogue Ballerina, was published in 2021.

Pazcoguin is a proponent of greater diversity and inclusion within the ballet community. With former dancer Phil Chan, she started "Final Bow for Yellowface" in 2017, a campaign to combat Asian stereotypes in ballet productions such as The Nutcracker. The pledge advanced by Pazcoguin and the campaign was signed by more than 100 dancers and industry leaders.

== Theater ==
She joined American Dance Machine for the 21st Century (a reboot of the American Dance Machine) in 2012. As a soloist with the company, which recreates famous theatre dance numbers from Broadway musicals, she performed Chita Rivera's role in Jack Cole's Beal Street Blues, Victoria the White Cat's solo from Cats, and the female soloist role in Jerome Robbin's Mr. Monotony.

Pazcoguin made her Broadway debut in August 2015 as a temporary replacement for her NYCB colleague Megan Fairchild in the role of Ivy Smith in the revival of On the Town. The following year, she returned to Broadway and to the role of Victoria the White Cat in the 2016 Broadway revival of Cats. Pazcoguin noted that playing Victoria pushed her beyond her comfort zone, as the ingénue character was a departure from her usual roles. Pazcoguin left the production in March 2017 to return to dancing with NYCB.

== Accolades ==
- 2002 Mae L. Wien Award for Outstanding Promise – won
- 2017 Chita Rivera Award for Outstanding Female Dancer in a Broadway Show – nominated for Cats
