= Luigi Da Porto =

Italian writer and storiographer (1485-1529)

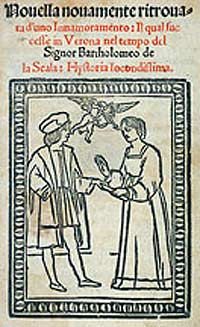
Frontispiece of Giulietta e Romeo from 1535. by Luigi da Porto

Luigi Da Porto (1485 in Vicenza – 10 May 1529) was an Italian writer and historiographer, better known as the author of the novella Historia novellamente ritrovata di due giovani amanti (Newly found story of two young lovers), with the story of Romeo and Juliet, later reprised by William Shakespeare for his famous drama.

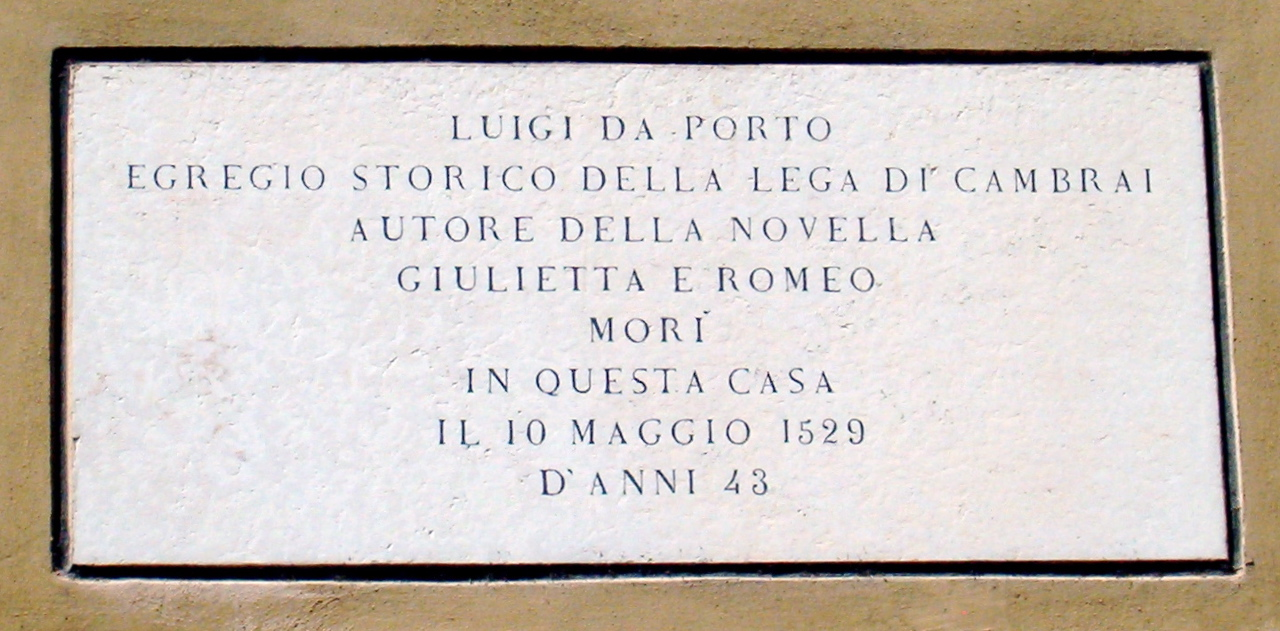
Commemorative stone, Contrà Porti, Vicenza

Da Porto wrote the novella in his villa in Montorso Vicentino near Vicenza before June 1524, and dedicated it to his cousin Lucina Savorgnan. Its existence before 1524 is demonstrated by a letter from Pietro Bembo to Luigi Da Porto that is dated June 9, 1524. The novel was taken up 30 years later by Matteo Bandello.

The novel was published posthumously and anonymously about 1531 in Venice with the title Historia novellamente ritrovata di due nobili amanti (Newly found story of two noble lovers). The origin of the story of the two unlucky lovers is disputed; however, Da Porto probably took the inspiration from a tale by Masuccio Salernitano called Mariotto e Ganozza, introducing many modern elements reprised by Shakespeare's drama.

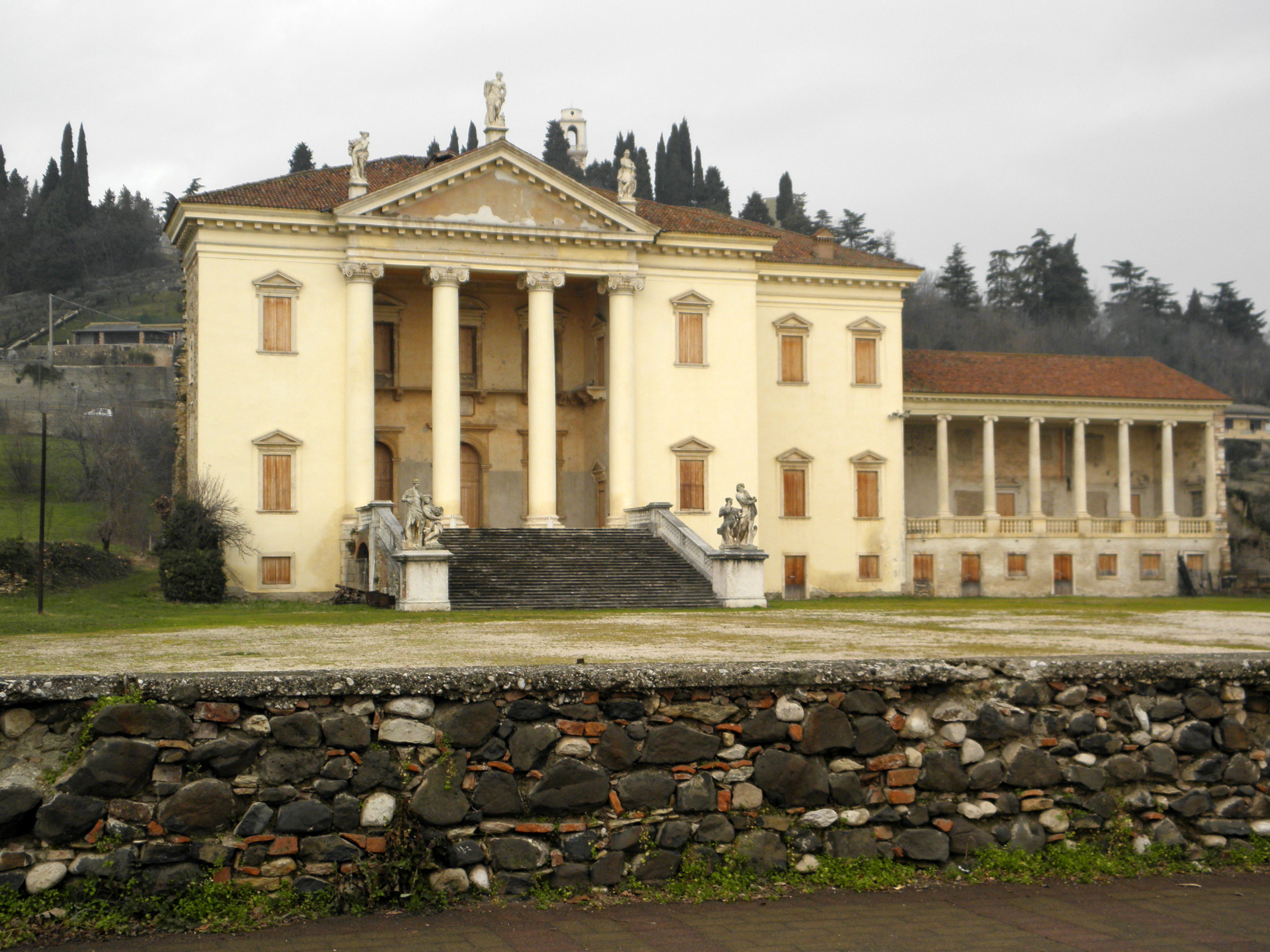
Da Porto could see the two castles of Montecchio Maggiore from the Villa Da Porto, shown here as renovated in 1724.

Some inspiration may have stemmed from da Porto's own experiences: On 26 February 1511, the day before the Cruel Fat Thursday in Udine, he apparently fell in love with the sixteen-year-old (or older) Lucina Savorgnan, who enchanted a ball with her singing. At the time, the conflicts between and within Friulian clans were at a critical point. The Friulian nobility was divided into two factions, the "Zamberlani" (in favor of the Republic of Venice) and the "Strumieri" (in favor of the German Empire). Among the former was the Monticoli (or Montecchi) family, expelled from the Veneto and taking refuge in Udine in the 14th century. This too may have suggested to the author the idea of contrasting the families of the Capuleti and the Montecchi. Furthermore, like the unfortunate protagonists of the novella, the love between Lucina and Luigi would have been greatly hindered by the division within the Savorgnan family itself: Da Porto was very close to his uncle Antonio Savorgnan but unfortunately, Antonio's relationship with Lucina's guardian Girolamo Savorgnan was at a nadir. Years later, badly wounded and paralyzed from his battles, Luigi wrote the novella in his villa. Although the setting of the story is Verona, the inspiration for the idea of two warring families came also from the two castles of Montecchio Maggiore, which he could see from his window in his villa. He dedicated the work to Lucina, who by then had become married to Francesco Savorgnan, another of Antonio's nephews.

Da Porto set the story in Verona (at that time, a strategic city for Venice), during the signoria of Bartolomeo I della Scala (1301–1304), but from some detail, the urban structure resembles more that of Udine. He created the names of Romeo (later Romeus) and Giulietta (soon to be Juliet in England) and even created the characters of Mercutio, Tybalt, Friar Laurence and Paris.
