= Mercutio =

Character in Romeo and Juliet

- Romeo and Juliet character
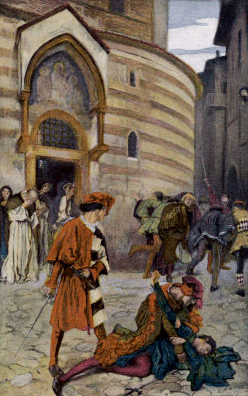
- Romeo and Juliet Act III Scene I The Death of Romeo's Friend, Mercutio. Edwin Austin Abbey, 1904
- Created by: William Shakespeare

In-universe information
- Affiliation: Romeo; Benvolio; Juliet
- Family: Valentine (brother); Prince Escalus (uncle); Count Paris

Mercutio (/mɜːrˈkjuːʃioʊ/ mur-KEW-shee-oh; Italian: Mercuzio [merˈkuttsjo]) is a fictional character in William Shakespeare's 1597 tragedy Romeo and Juliet. He is a close friend to Romeo and blood related to Prince Escalus and Count Paris. As such, Mercutio is one of the few characters in the play who can mingle with people from both of the feuding Montague and Capulet families. The invitation to Lord Capulet's party states that he has a brother named Valentine.

Though often fun-loving and witty, the latter demonstrated in his Queen Mab speech in the first act, Mercutio's sense of humour can at times be facetious or even coarse, much to his friends' annoyance. He is also moody and given to sudden outbursts of temper, one of which sets a key plot development in motion.

== Role in the play ==
One of Romeo's closest friends, Mercutio entreats Romeo to forget about his unrequited love for a girl named Rosaline and come with him to a masquerade ball at Lord Capulet's estate. There, Romeo is drawn to Capulet's daughter Juliet. He finds himself in love and immediately forgets about Rosaline. When Mercutio sees Romeo the next day, he is glad to see that his friend is his old self again, and he encourages Romeo, all the while making bawdy jokes at the expense of Juliet's Nurse.

After Romeo receives a death threat from Juliet's cousin Tybalt, Mercutio expects Romeo to engage Tybalt in a duel. However, Romeo refuses to fight Tybalt because Romeo now considers Tybalt to be kin due to his secret marriage to Juliet. Mercutio is incensed at his friend's "calm, dishonorable, vile submission" and decides to fight Tybalt himself, referring to his own sword as his "fiddlestick". Romeo attempts to intervene. By stepping between the dueling men, however, he inadvertently hinders Mercutio, allowing Tybalt to inflict a fatal blow. Before he dies, Mercutio curses both the Montagues and Capulets, crying several times, "A plague o' both your houses!" (Act III, Sc. 1). He makes one final pun before he dies: "Ask for me to-morrow, and you shall find me a grave man." A grief-stricken and enraged Romeo kills Tybalt, resulting in his banishment from Verona and beginning the tragic turn of events that make up the rest of the play.

== Name origins ==
The name Mercutio was present in Shakespeare's sources for Romeo and Juliet, though his character was not well developed and he was presented as a romantic rival for Juliet. The name is first used in Luigi Da Porto's 1530 Giulietta e Romeo. Da Porto briefly introduces a character named Marcuccio Guertio, a noble youth "with very cold hands, in July as in January", who makes Giulietta Cappelletti appreciate the warm hands of Romeo Montecchi.

== Mercutio's death ==
Earlier versions of the story described a different chain of events leading to Tybalt's death, omitting Mercutio completely. Arthur Brooke's The Tragical History of Romeus and Juliet and William Painter's 1567 versions of the story both left the entire episode solely to Romeo and Tybalt. In both stories, Tybalt attacks the pacifist Romeo with such force that Romeo is forced to take up the sword to defend himself. He is then banished rather than executed because the killing was provoked. In 1672, English poet John Dryden wrote, "Shakespeare show'd the best of his skill in his Mercutio, and he said himself, that he was forced to murder him in the third Act, to being killed by him."

The addition of Mercutio into the fray increases the tension, and Tybalt is presented as a slightly more peaceful character than in previous versions, as Mercutio is disgusted by the fact that Tybalt continues to search for a quarrel with Romeo when Romeo is trying to bring peace between them. Mercutio hurls insults and taunts at Tybalt and draws the sword first, in reaction to Tybalt's insults, which are directed to Romeo.

Mercutio's death in Act III, scene I is the pivotal point of the play, which up to this point is relatively light-hearted. Mercutio's death is sudden and makes death a dark reality for several characters, causing a domino effect that leads ultimately to the tragic climax.

== Performers ==
A number of famous actors have played the role of Mercutio. including:

=== Stage ===
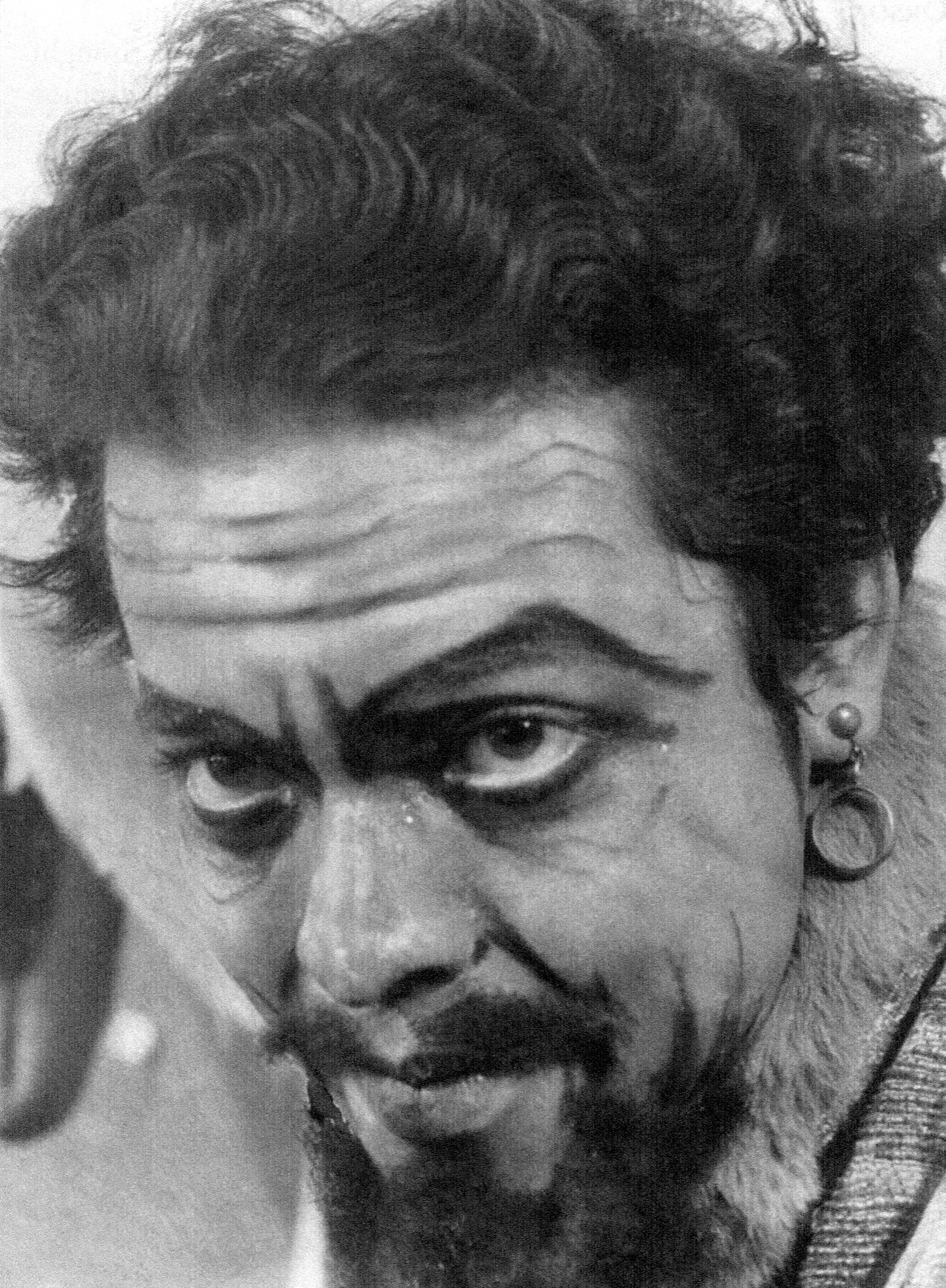
Orson Welles as Mercutio in repertory (1933)

- In 1933–1934, Orson Welles played the role of Mercutio in the Katharine Cornell repertory company's seven-month transcontinental tour, which was his professional debut on the American stage.
- In 1935, Laurence Olivier and John Gielgud alternated the roles of Romeo and Mercutio in a London stage production directed by Gielgud.
- In 1945, Ralph Richardson made his Broadway debut as Mercutio opposite Maurice Evans’ Romeo and Katharine Cornell’s Juliet.
- In 1947, Paul Scofield played Mercutio in a production directed by Peter Brook.
- In 1958, Alec McCowen enjoyed a major success as Mercutio in London.
- In 1976, Michael Pennington played the role opposite Ian McKellen and Francesca Annis in Trevor Nunn's production for the Royal Shakespeare Company.
- In 1992, Colm Feore played Mercutio in a production directed by Richard Monette at Canada's Stratford Festival. Antoni Cimolino played Romeo and Megan Follows was Juliet.
- In 2005 Zoltán Bereczki played Mercutio in the Hungarian production of Gérard Presgurvic's musical Roméo et Juliette: de la Haine à l'Amour.
- In 2006, Benjamin Walker portrayed Mercutio during the Williamstown Theater Festival with Emmy Rossum as Juliet and Greg Hildreth as Benvolio.

=== Film ===
- In 1936, John Barrymore portrayed Mercutio in George Cukor's film Romeo and Juliet opposite Leslie Howard as Romeo.
- In 1968, John McEnery portrayed Mercutio in Franco Zeffirelli's film Romeo and Juliet.
- In 1976, Robin Nedwell played Mercutio in the Thames Television production directed by Joan Kemp-Welch, with Christopher Neame as Romeo and Ann Hasson as Juliet.
- In 1978, Anthony Andrews played the role in the BBC Television Shakespeare production, the first in a series of adaptations of all Shakespeare's plays.
- In 1996, Harold Perrineau portrayed Mercutio in Baz Luhrmann's modernised version, William Shakespeare's Romeo + Juliet.
- In 1998, Ben Affleck portrayed actor Edward Alleyn in the romantic comedy Shakespeare in Love. In the film, Alleyn serves as history's first Mercutio.
- In 2007, Tetsuya Kakihara and Christopher Bevins voice Mercutio in the anime series Romeo x Juliet.
- In 2011, Hale Appleman portrayed Mercutio in Alan Brown's Private Romeo, a modern-day adaptation set at an all-male military academy.
- In 2013, Christian Cooke played Mercutio in the film adaptation directed by Carlo Carlei, starring Douglas Booth as Romeo and Hailee Steinfeld as Juliet.
- In 2021, Mike Faist played Mercutio-equivalent character Riff Lorton in Steven Spielberg’s remake of West Side Story.

== See also ==
- Complete list of Shakespearean characters
