= Benvolio =

Character in Romeo and Juliet

- Romeo and Juliet character
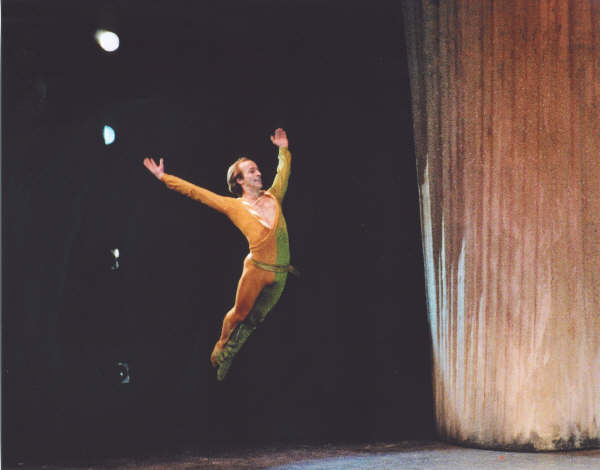
- Jacques St-Cyr as Benvolio in Prokofiev's Romeo and Juliet
- First appearance: Romeo e Giulietta; 1554
- Created by: Matteo Bandello, William Shakespeare

In-universe information
- Gender: Male
- Family: Lord Montague (uncle); Lady Montague (aunt); Romeo Montague (cousin)
- Nationality: Italian

Benvolio Montague (Italian: Benvolio Montecchi) is a fictional character in William Shakespeare's tragedy Romeo and Juliet. He is Lord Montague's nephew and Romeo's cousin. Benvolio serves as an unsuccessful peacemaker in the play, attempting to prevent violence between the Capulet and Montague families.

== Sources ==
In 1554, Matteo Bandello published the second volume of his Novelle which included his version of Giulietta e Romeo. Bandello emphasises Romeo's initial depression and the feud between the families, and introduces the Nurse and Benvolio. Bandello's story was translated into French by Pierre Boaistuau in 1559 in the second volume of his Histoires Tragiques. Boaistuau adds much moralizing and sentiment, and the characters indulge in rhetorical outbursts.

== Role in the play ==
Benvolio is Lord Montague's nephew and Romeo's cousin. He is usually portrayed as a kind and thoughtful person who attempts to look out for his cousin and Mercutio.

Benvolio spends most of Act I attempting to distract his cousin from his infatuation with Rosaline but following the first appearance of Mercutio in I.iv, he and Mercutio become more closely aligned until III.i. In that scene, he drags the fatally wounded Mercutio offstage, before returning to inform Romeo of Mercutio's death and the Prince of the course of Tybalt and Mercutio's deaths. Benvolio then disappears from the play (though, as a Montague, he may implicitly be included in the stage direction in the final scene "Enter Lord Montague and others" and he is sometimes doubled with Balthasar).

Part of Benvolio's role is encouraging Romeo to go to the party, where he falls in love with Juliet.

== Performances ==
A mock-Victorian revisionist version of Romeo and Juliet's final scene (with a happy ending, Romeo, Juliet, Mercutio and Paris restored to life and Benvolio revealing that he is Paris's love, Benvolia, in disguise) forms part of the 1980 stage-play The Life and Adventures of Nicholas Nickleby. He also attempts to romance Rosaline in Sharman Macdonald's After Juliet.

In the 2019 British musical & Juliet Benvolio is portrayed by Kirstie Skivington.

== Portrayals ==
In 1968 the part of Benvolio was played by Bruce Robinson in Romeo and Juliet.

In the 1996 version of Romeo and Juliet, the actor who played Benvolio was Dash Mihok.

In the 2001 French musical Roméo et Juliette: de la Haine à l'Amour, the role was originated by Grégori Baquet.

In the 2013 version of Romeo and Juliet, the actor who played Benvolio was Kodi Smit-McPhee. Benvolio gets a larger supporting role as he narrates the film and replaces Abraham's scenes in the final act of the film.
