= Romeo and Juliet (1968 film) =

1968 film by Franco Zeffirelli

- Theatrical release poster
- Directed by: Franco Zeffirelli
- Screenplay by: Franco Brusati; Masolino D'Amico; Franco Zeffirelli
- Based on: Romeo and Juliet; 1597 play by William Shakespeare
- Produced by: John Brabourne; Anthony Havelock-Allan
- Starring: Leonard Whiting; Olivia Hussey; Milo O'Shea; Michael York; John McEnery; Pat Heywood; Natasha Parry; Robert Stephens
- Narrated by: Laurence Olivier
- Cinematography: Pasqualino De Santis
- Edited by: Reginald Mills
- Music by: Nino Rota
- Production companies: BHE Films; Dino De Laurentiis Cinematografica; Verona Produzione
- Distributed by: Paramount Pictures
- Release dates: 4 March 1968 (Royal Film Performance); 5 March 1968 (UK); 8 October 1968 (US); 19 October 1968 (Italy)
- Running time: 138 minutes
- Countries: Italy; United Kingdom
- Languages: English; Italian
- Budget: $850,000
- Box office: $38.9 million

Romeo and Juliet (Italian: Romeo e Giulietta) is a 1968 period romantic tragedy film, based on the play of the same name by William Shakespeare. Directed and co-written by Franco Zeffirelli, the film stars Leonard Whiting as Romeo and Olivia Hussey as Juliet. Laurence Olivier spoke the film's prologue and epilogue and dubs the voice of Antonio Pierfederici, who played Lord Montague but was not credited on-screen. The cast also features Milo O'Shea, Michael York, John McEnery, Bruce Robinson, and Robert Stephens.

The film adaptation of a Shakespeare play was a financial success during its time of release. It became popular among teenagers because it was the first adaptation to cast actors close to the age of the characters from the original play. Many critics also praised the film. It won Academy Awards for Best Cinematography and Best Costume Design. It was also nominated for Best Director and Best Picture, making it the most recent Shakespearean film to be nominated for the latter category. Whiting and Hussey both won Golden Globe Awards for Most Promising Newcomers.

== Plot ==
One summer morning in 15th century Verona, a longstanding feud between the Montague and the Capulet clans breaks out in a street brawl. The brawl is broken up by the Prince, who warns both families that any future violence between them will result in harsh consequences. That night, two teenagers of the two families—Romeo and Juliet—meet at a Capulet masked ball and fall in love. Later, Romeo stumbles into the secluded garden under Juliet's bedroom balcony and the two exchange impassioned pledges. They are secretly married the next day by Romeo's confessor and father figure, Friar Laurence, with the assistance of Juliet's nurse.

That afternoon, Juliet's cousin Tybalt, furious that Romeo had attended his family's ball, insults him and challenges him to a brawl. Romeo now regards Tybalt as family and he refuses to fight him, which leads Romeo's best friend, Mercutio, to fight Tybalt instead. Despite Romeo's efforts to stop the fight, Tybalt mortally wounds Mercutio, who curses both the Montague and Capulet houses before dying. Enraged over his friend's death, Romeo retaliates by fighting Tybalt and killing him. Romeo is subsequently punished by the Prince with banishment from Verona, with the threat of death if he ever returns. Romeo then secretly spends his wedding night with Juliet, the couple consummate their marriage, and Romeo flees.

Juliet's parents, unaware of their daughter's secret marriage, have arranged for Juliet to marry wealthy Count Paris. Juliet pleads with her parents to postpone the marriage, but they refuse and threaten to disown her. Juliet seeks out Friar Laurence for help, hoping to escape her arranged marriage to Paris and remain faithful to Romeo. At Friar Laurence's behest, she reconciles with her parents and agrees to their wishes. On the night before the wedding, Juliet consumes a potion prepared by Friar Laurence intended to make her appear dead for 42 hours. Friar Laurence plans to inform Romeo of the hoax so that Romeo can meet Juliet after her burial and escape with her when she recovers from her swoon, so he sends Friar John to give Romeo a letter describing the plan.

However, when Balthasar, Romeo's servant, sees Juliet being buried under the impression that she is dead, he goes to tell Romeo and reaches him before Friar John. In despair, Romeo goes to Juliet's tomb and kills himself by drinking poison. Soon afterwards, Friar Laurence arrives as Juliet awakens. Despite his attempts to persuade her to flee from the crypt, Juliet refuses to leave Romeo, and once the Friar flees, she kills herself by plunging his dagger into her chest. Later, the two families, having ended their feud, attend their joint funeral and are condemned by the Prince.

== Cast ==
The House of Montague

- Antonio Pierfederici as Lord Montague
- Esmeralda Ruspoli as Lady Montague
- Leonard Whiting as Romeo
- Bruce Robinson as Benvolio
- Keith Skinner as Balthasar
- Roberto Antonelli as Abram

The House of Capulet

- Paul Hardwick as Lord Capulet
- Natasha Parry as Lady Capulet
- Olivia Hussey as Juliet
- Michael York as Tybalt
- Dyson Lovell as Sampson
- Richard Warwick as Gregory
- Pat Heywood as The Nurse
- Roy Holder as Peter

Others

- John McEnery as Mercutio
- Milo O'Shea as Friar Laurence
- Robert Stephens as Prince Escalus of Verona
- Roberto Bisacco as Paris
- Paola Tedesco as Rosaline (uncredited)
- Bruno Filippini as Leonardo, the singer (uncredited)
- Laurence Olivier as the chorus and voice of Lord Montague (uncredited)

== Production ==
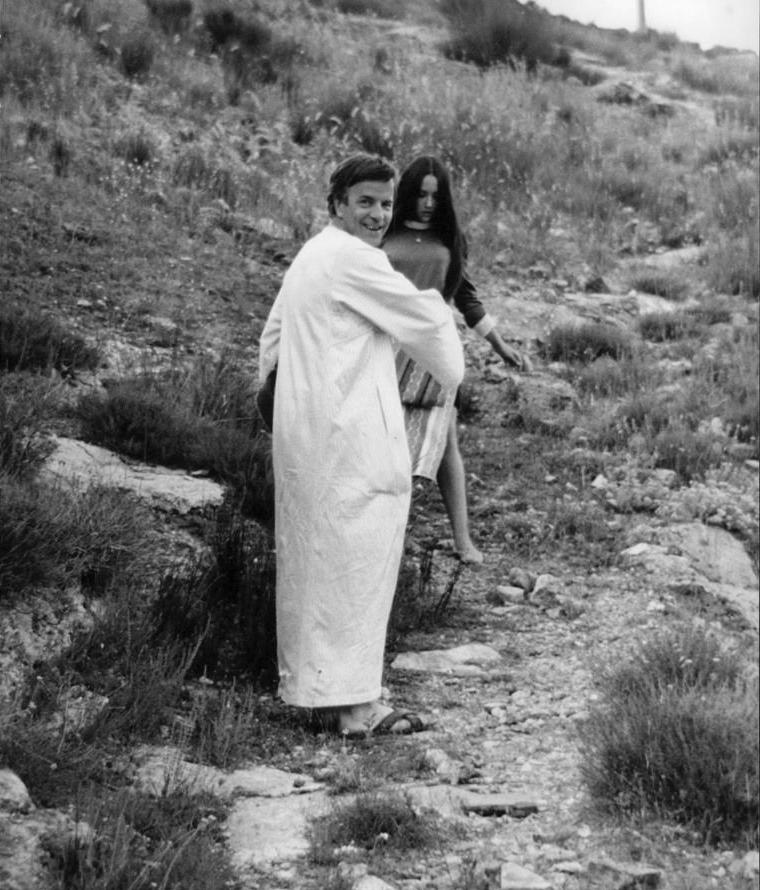
Franco Zeffirelli and Olivia Hussey while filming Romeo and Juliet in 1967

=== Casting ===
Paul McCartney has said he was considered by Franco Zeffirelli for the role of Romeo. Although Zeffirelli does not mention it in his autobiography, McCartney provided details on this account (including meeting with Olivia Hussey and exchanging telegrams with her) in his co-written autobiography.

Zeffirelli engaged in a worldwide search for unknown teenage actors to play the parts of the two lovers. Musician Phil Collins was in the running for Romeo, while his then-girlfriend Lavinia Lang (herself a great friend to Hussey) was in the running for Juliet, as was actress Anjelica Huston, but the latter's father, director John Huston, withdrew her from consideration when he decided to cast her in his film A Walk with Love and Death. When they were cast, Whiting and Hussey were 16 and 15 years old respectively. However, both stars had aged a year by the time filming began in the summer of 1967. Zeffirelli adapted the play in such a way as to play to their strengths and hide their weaknesses: for instance, long speeches were trimmed, and he emphasized reaction shots. Zeffirelli said of the casting: "It's a tremendous risk. We just hope to have the right chemistry – a melancholy Romeo who rebels like all the youth of today and a pure, determined Juliet. If we fail, it will be ridiculous."

Laurence Olivier's involvement in the production was by happenstance. He was in Rome to film The Shoes of the Fisherman and visited the studio where Romeo and Juliet was being shot. He asked Zeffirelli if there was anything he could do, and was given the Prologue to read, then ended up dubbing the voice of Lord Montague as well as other assorted minor roles.

=== Filming ===
After cast readings in late May, rehearsals and filming began at the end of June 1967 in Tuscania, Italy, then moved to Pienza, Gubbio, and Artena, before completing at Cinecittà movie studios in Rome. The balcony scene was filmed in Artena in September 1967.

The film is set in 14th century pre-Renaissance Italy.

- The balcony scene: at the Palazzo Borghese, built by Cardinal Scipione Borghese in the 16th century, in Artena, 40 km southeast of Rome.
- The interior church scenes: at the Romanesque church of San Pietro, Tuscania in the town of Tuscania, 90 km northwest of Rome.
- The tomb scene: also in Tuscania.
- The palace of the Capulets' scenes: at Palazzo Piccolomini, built from 1459 to 1462 by Pope Pius II, in the city of Pienza in the Siena province.
- The duelling scenes with swords were filmed in the old Umbrian town of Gubbio.
- The street scenes: also in Pienza and on the Cinecittà Studios backlot, Rome.

=== Editing ===
During post-production, several scenes were trimmed or cut. Act 5, Scene 3, in which Romeo fights and eventually kills Paris outside Juliet's crypt, was filmed but deleted from the final print. According to Leonard Whiting and Roberto Bisacco, Zeffirelli cut the scene because he felt it unnecessarily made Romeo less sympathetic.

The final budgeted cost for the film was US$850,000 (equivalent to $7,869,617 in 2025).

== Release and reception ==
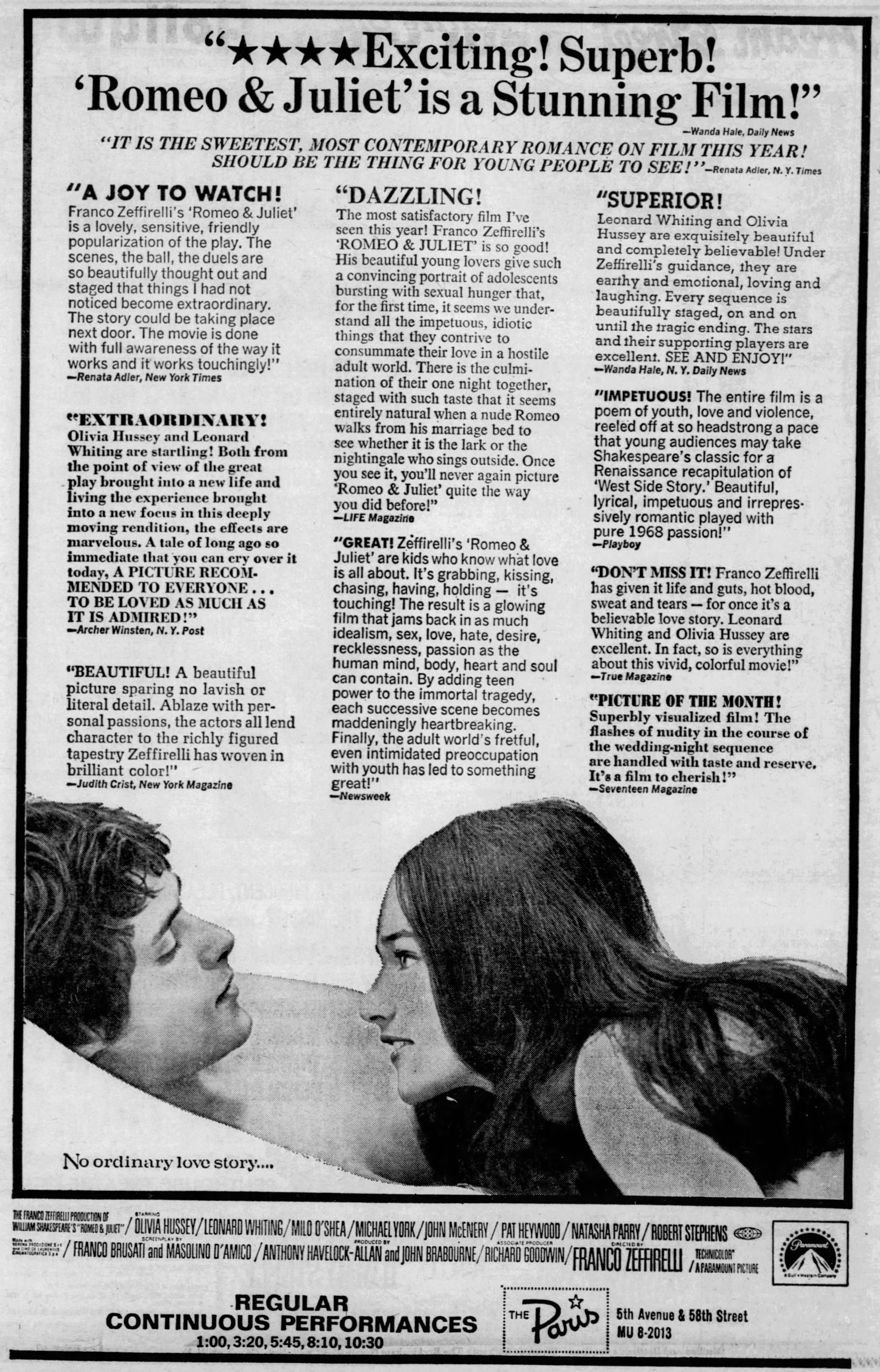
U.S. theatrical advertisement, 1968

On March 4, 1968, Romeo and Juliet premiered during the Royal Film Performance, and was widely released in the United Kingdom the next day. It was released on 8 October 1968 in the United States and on 19 October in Italy. The film earned $14.5 million in North American box-office rentals during 1969 (equivalent to $97.51 million in 2025). It was re-released in 1973 and earned US$1.7 million in rentals (equivalent to $9.39 million in 2025).

The Motion Picture Association of America initially gave the film a G rating in the United States when it was first released, although they re-rated it to a PG rating in its 1973 re-release.

Rotten Tomatoes gives the film a "Fresh" score of 95% based on 41 reviews, with an average rating of 8/10, accompanied by a positive consensus: "The solid leads and arresting visuals make a case for Zeffirelli's Romeo and Juliet as the definitive cinematic adaptation of the play."

Roger Ebert of the Chicago Sun-Times wrote: "I believe Franco Zeffirelli's Romeo and Juliet is the most exciting film of Shakespeare ever made."

=== Awards and nominations ===
Award	Category	Nominee(s)	Result
Academy Awards	Best Picture	John Brabourne and Anthony Havelock-Allan	Nominated
Academy Awards	Best Director	Franco Zeffirelli	Nominated
Academy Awards	Best Cinematography	Pasqualino De Santis	Won
Academy Awards	Best Costume Design	Danilo Donati	Won
British Academy Film Awards	Best Direction	Franco Zeffirelli	Nominated
British Academy Film Awards	Best Actor in a Supporting Role	John McEnery	Nominated
British Academy Film Awards	Best Actress in a Supporting Role	Pat Heywood	Nominated
British Academy Film Awards	Best Art Direction	Renzo Mongiardino	Nominated
British Academy Film Awards	Best Costume Design	Danilo Donati	Won
British Academy Film Awards	Best Film Editing	Reginald Mills	Nominated
British Academy Film Awards	Best Film Music	Nino Rota	Nominated
David di Donatello Awards	Best Director	Franco Zeffirelli	Won
David di Donatello Awards	Golden Plate Award	Olivia Hussey and Leonard Whiting	Won
Directors Guild of America Awards	Outstanding Directorial Achievement in Motion Pictures	Franco Zeffirelli	Nominated
Golden Globe Awards	Best English-Language Foreign Film	Romeo and Juliet	Won
Golden Globe Awards	Best Director – Motion Picture	Franco Zeffirelli	Nominated
Golden Globe Awards	Best Original Score – Motion Picture	Nino Rota	Nominated
Golden Globe Awards	Most Promising Newcomer – Male	Leonard Whiting	Won
Golden Globe Awards	Most Promising Newcomer – Female	Olivia Hussey	Won
Laurel Awards	Top Drama	Romeo and Juliet	Nominated
Laurel Awards	Top Cinematographer	Pasqualino De Santis	Nominated
Laurel Awards	Top Male New Face	Michael York	Nominated
Laurel Awards	Top Female New Face	Olivia Hussey	Nominated
Nastro d'Argento Awards	Best Director	Franco Zeffirelli	Won
Nastro d'Argento Awards	Best Cinematography – Color	Pasqualino De Santis	Won
Nastro d'Argento Awards	Best Costume Design	Danilo Donati	Won
Nastro d'Argento Awards	Best Score	Nino Rota	Won
Nastro d'Argento Awards	Best Production Design	Lorenzo Mongiardino	Won
National Board of Review Awards	Top Ten Films	Romeo and Juliet	Won
National Board of Review Awards	Best Director	Franco Zeffirelli	Won
Thessaloniki International Film Festival	Honorary Award	Franco Zeffirelli	Won

=== Lawsuit ===
Despite her previous defense of the film's nudity, asserting that it was done "tastefully" and was "needed for the film", Hussey, along with Whiting, filed a lawsuit on 3 January 2023 in the Los Angeles County Superior Court against Paramount Pictures for US$500 million, alleging sexual abuse, sexual harassment and fraud, and for allowing Zeffirelli to film them in the nude without their knowledge. The suit alleges that the actors feel this caused them to suffer through emotional damage and mental anguish for decades after the film's success, and left them with careers that failed to reflect that success. Zeffirelli's son responded to the lawsuit critically, calling it "embarrassing" that Hussey and Whiting filed the suit "55 years after filming" and that they owe their entire careers to the success of the film.

The lawsuit was later dismissed on 25 May 2023, by Los Angeles Superior Court Judge Alison Mackenzie, who stated that the case did not meet the requirements for suspending the statute of limitations for child sexual abuse. Mackenzie also criticized the plaintiffs for "cherry picking" which statutes applied to their case. As of 2023 Hussey and Whiting are allegedly planning to appeal the ruling, as well as file a separate lawsuit based on a much more "recent Criterion DVD release of the film which [sic] would not be affected by the statute of limitations."

A second lawsuit was dismissed on 21 October 2024, by Los Angeles Superior Court Judge Holly J. Fujie, in which Hussey and Whiting claimed that the Criterion physical media release triggered a new statute of limitations. The new lawsuit was filed under state and federal laws intended to combat "revenge pornography", which prohibit non-consensual distribution of intimate images. Judge Fujie stated in full, "A comparison of the 2023 release with the prior versions shows no significant visible improvement in the film, particularly in the bedroom scene, to the naked eye. Even in the absence of express consent, however, Plaintiffs' subsequent conduct in the decades that followed since the film's original 1968 release speaks to Plaintiffs' implied ratification and approval of the film, including the bedroom scene. This includes, among others, appearances and statements made by Plaintiffs during interviews and attendance at film festivals, during which Plaintiffs did not object to the continuing release and distribution of the successive releases of the film."

== Soundtrack ==
Two releases of the score of the film, composed by Nino Rota, have been made.

The film's "Love Theme from Romeo and Juliet" was widely disseminated, notably in "Our Tune", a segment of Simon Bates's radio show. In addition, various versions of the theme have been recorded and released, including a highly successful one by Henry Mancini, whose instrumental rendition was a success in the United States during June 1969.

There are two different sets of English lyrics to the song.

- The film's version is called "What Is a Youth?", featuring lyrics by Eugene Walter, and sung by Glen Weston. This version has been released on the complete score/soundtrack release.
- An alternate version, called "A Time for Us", features lyrics by Larry Kusik and Eddie Snyder. This version has been recorded by Johnny Mathis, Andy Williams and Shirley Bassey for her 1968 album This Is My Life. Josh Groban performed "Un Giorno Per Noi", an Italian version of "A Time for Us". Jonathan Antoine, a classically trained tenor from Great Britain, performed "Un Giorno Per Noi" as one of the tracks on his album "Believe", released in August 2016.

A third version called "Ai Giochi Addio", featuring lyrics by Elsa Morante and sung in the Italian version by Bruno Filippini, who plays the minstrel in the film, has been performed by opera singers such as Luciano Pavarotti and Natasha Marsh.
