= Friar Laurence =

Character in Romeo and Juliet

Friar Lawrence
- Romeo and Juliet character
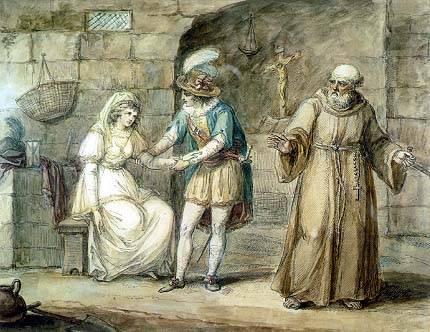
- Romeo and Juliet with Friar Laurence by Henry Bunbury
- Created by: William Shakespeare

In-universe information
- Occupation: Friar
- Religion: Catholic
- Home: Verona

Friar Laurence (spelled Frier Lawrence in the First Folio) is a character in William Shakespeare's play Romeo and Juliet.

== Role in the play ==
Friar Laurence is a friar who plays the part of a wise adviser to Romeo and Juliet, along with aiding in major plot developments.

Alone, he foreshadows the later, tragic events of the play with his soliloquy about plants and their similarities to humans. When Romeo requests the Friar marry him to Juliet, he is shocked, because only days before, Romeo had been infatuated with Rosaline, a woman who did not return his love. Nevertheless, Friar Laurence decides to marry Romeo and Juliet in the attempt to stop the civil feud between the Capulets and the Montagues.

When Romeo is banished for killing Tybalt and flees to Mantua, Friar Laurence attempts to help the two lovers get back together using a potion to fake Juliet's death. The friar sends a letter to Romeo explaining the situation, but it does not reach him because the people of Mantua suspect the messenger came from a house infected with the plague, and the Friar is unable to arrive at the Capulet's monument in time. Romeo kills Count Paris, whom he finds weeping near Juliet's corpse, then dies by suicide, by drinking poison that he bought from an impoverished apothecary, over what he thinks is Juliet's dead body. Friar Laurence arrives just as Juliet awakes from her chemically induced slumber. He urges Juliet not to be rash and to join a society of nuns, but he hears a noise from outside and then flees from the tomb. Juliet then kills herself with Romeo's dagger, completing the tragedy. The Friar is forced to return to the tomb, where he recounts the entire story to Prince Escalus and all the Montagues and Capulets. As he finishes, the prince proclaims, "We have still known thee for a holy man."

== Meter ==
Shakespeare uses a variety of poetic forms throughout the play. He begins with a 14-line prologue in the form of a Shakespearean sonnet, spoken by a Chorus. Most of Romeo and Juliet is, however, written in blank verse and much of it in strict iambic pentameter, with less rhythmic variation than in most of Shakespeare's later plays. In choosing forms, Shakespeare matches the poetry to the character who uses it. Friar Laurence, for example, uses sermon and sententiae forms and the Nurse uses a unique blank verse form that closely matches colloquial speech.

== Portrayals ==
In 1968, the part of Friar Lawrence was played by Milo O'Shea in Romeo and Juliet. In 1996, the role was played by Pete Postlethwaite in Romeo + Juliet.

The West Side Story (1961) character Doc fills a similar role to Friar Lawrence; Doc was played by Ned Glass. In the 2021 version, that role was rewritten for Rita Moreno as Doc's widow.

In Romeo & Juliet: Sealed with a Kiss, Friar Lawrence is portrayed as a sea otter and voiced by Michael Toland.

The role of Friar Laurence in Romeo & Juliet (2013) was played by Paul Giamatti.
