= Count Paris =

Character in Romeo and Juliet

- Romeo and Juliet character
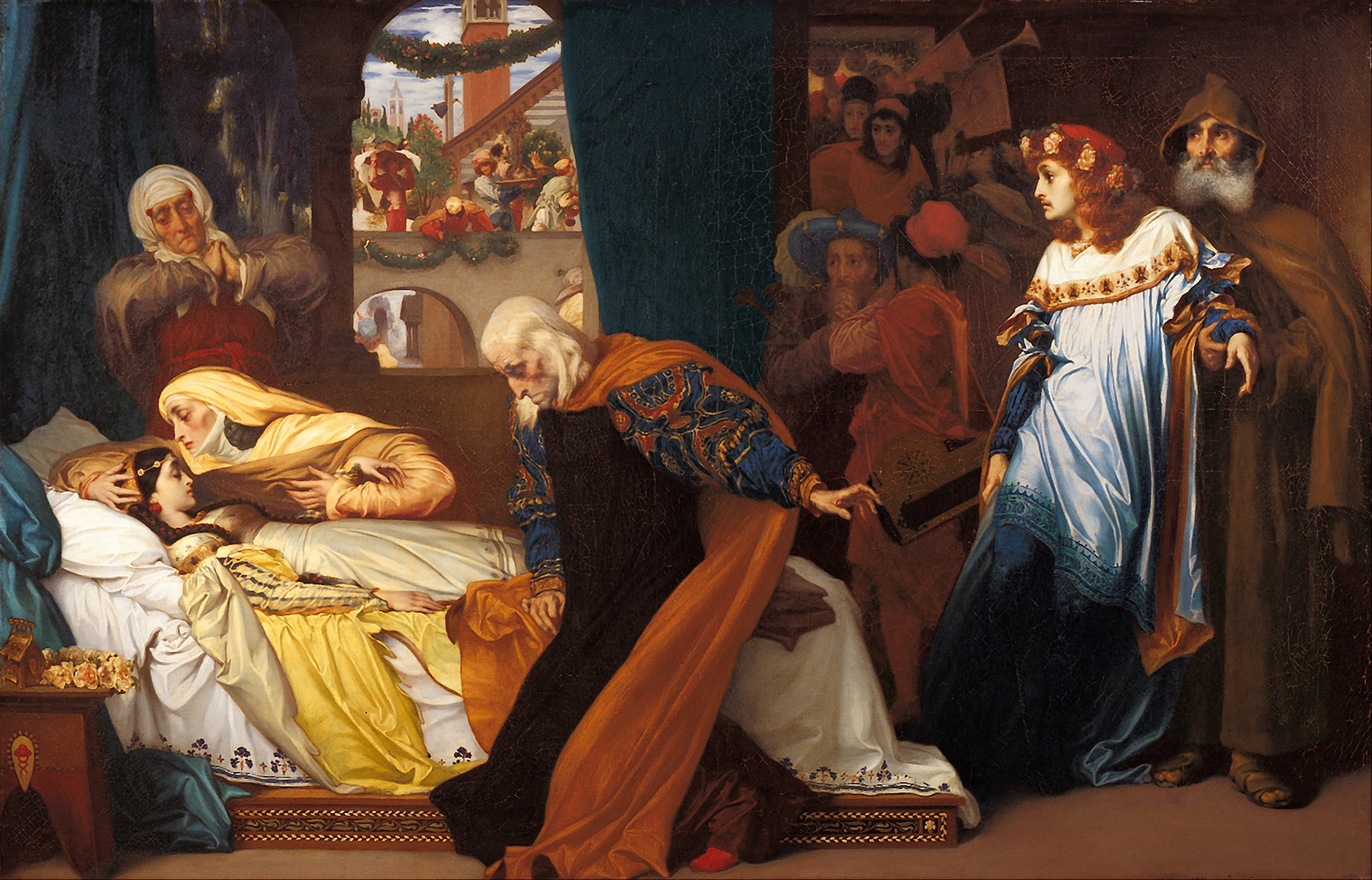
- Frederic Leighton's 1850s painting depicting Count Paris (right) seeing Juliet apparently dead
- Created by: William Shakespeare

In-universe information
- Family: Prince Escalus, Mercutio

Count Paris (Italian: il Conte Paride) or County Paris is a fictional character in William Shakespeare's Romeo and Juliet. He is a suitor of Juliet. He is handsome, wealthy, and a kinsman to Prince Escalus.

His name comes from the Prince of Troy, Paris, in Homer's Illiad.

== Sources ==
Luigi da Porto adapted the story as Giulietta e Romeo and included it in his Historia novellamente ritrovata di due Nobili Amanti published in 1530. Da Porto drew on Pyramus and Thisbe and Boccaccio's Decameron. He gave it much of its modern form, including the lovers' names, the rival Montecchi and Capuleti families, and the location in Verona. He also introduces characters corresponding to Shakespeare's Mercutio, Tybalt, and Paris, though the latter is only referred to as il conte di Lodrone. Da Porto presents his tale as historically true and claims it took place in the days of Bartolomeo II della Scala (a century earlier than Salernitano). Montecchi and Capuleti were actual 13th-century political factions, but the only connection between them is a mention in Dante's Purgatorio as an example of civil dissension. The name Paris was first given to il conte di Lodrone by Matteo Bandello, whose novella on the tragedy was first published in Lucca in 1554. Paris, or Paride, was the name of several of the historical Counts of Lodron, a minor noble family from Trentino.

== Role in the play ==
Paris makes his first appearance in Act I, Scene II, where he offers to make Juliet his wife and the mother of his children. Juliet's father, Capulet, demurs, telling him to wait until she is older. Capulet invites Paris to attend a family ball being held that evening, and grants him permission to woo Juliet. Later in the play, however, after her cousin, Tybalt, dies by Romeo's hand, Juliet refuses to become Paris's "joyful bride". Capulet threatens to disown Juliet and turn her out of his house if she does not marry Paris. Juliet's mother, too, turns her back on Juliet shortly after Capulet storms out of the scene ("Talk not to me, for I'll not speak a word; do as thou wilt, for I have done with thee"), as does the Nurse. Then, at Friar Lawrence's cell at the church, Paris tries to woo Juliet by addressing her as his wife and saying they are to be married on Thursday. As he leaves at the Friar's request, he kisses her. When he has gone, Juliet threatens to kill herself if the Friar cannot help her avoid this impending marriage.

Paris's final appearance in the play is in the cemetery where Juliet, who has taken something to put her in a deathlike state, has been laid to rest in the Capulet family tomb. Believing her to be dead, Paris has come to mourn her in solitude and privacy and sends his manservant away. He professes his love to Juliet, saying he will weep for her nightly. Shortly thereafter, Romeo, deranged by grief himself, also goes to the Capulet's tomb and is confronted by Count Paris, who believes Romeo came to desecrate Juliet's tomb. A duel ensues and Paris is killed. Romeo drags Paris's body inside the Capulet tomb and lays him out on the floor beside Juliet's body, fulfilling Paris's dying wish.

== Historical context ==
The earliest versions of the text (First Quarto, Second Quarto and First Folio) all call him "Countie Paris". Some versions of the text call him "County Paris". "County" was in common usage at the time of writing, and Shakespeare's choice was dictated by the needs of the metre.

As a father, the chief role Capulet plays in Juliet's life is that of a matchmaker. He has raised and cared for Juliet for nearly fourteen years, but he must find a suitable husband who will care for her for the remainder of her life. Juliet, as a young woman and as an aristocrat in general, cannot support herself in the society of her day, her only available career choices are either wife or nun. Thus it falls upon her father and her husband to support her.

== Analysis ==
Although Paris is not as developed as other characters in the play, he stands as a complication in the development of Romeo and Juliet's relationship. His love of Juliet stands as he overthrows Romeo's impetuous love. In Act V, Scene III, Paris visits the crypt to quietly and privately mourn the loss of his would-be fiancée, before approaching Romeo whom he thinks has returned to Verona to vandalise the Capulet tomb. After refusing Romeo's pleas for him to leave, Paris and Romeo draw their swords and fight. Romeo eventually kills him during the sword fight, and his dying wish is for Romeo to lay him next to Juliet, which Romeo does. This scene is often omitted from modern stage and screen performances as it complicates what would otherwise be a simple love story between the title characters.

"Rosaline and Paris...are the subtlest reflectors of all...they are cast like a snake's skin by the more robust reality of Romeo and Juliet."

— Ruth Nevo, on the Rosaline-Juliet, Paris-Romeo comparison

Men often used Petrarchan sonnets to exaggerate the beauty of women who were impossible for them to attain, as in Romeo's situation with Rosaline. Capulet's wife uses this sonnet form to describe Count Paris to Juliet as a handsome man. When Romeo and Juliet meet, the poetic form changes from the Petrarchan (which was becoming archaic in Shakespeare's day) to a then more contemporary sonnet form, using "pilgrims" and "saints" as metaphors. Finally, when the two meet on the balcony, Romeo attempts to use the sonnet form to pledge his love, but Juliet breaks it by saying, "Dost thou love me?" By doing this, she searches for true expression, rather than a poetic exaggeration of their love. Juliet uses monosyllabic words with Romeo, but uses formal language with Paris. Other forms in the play include an epithalamium by Juliet, a rhapsody in Mercutio's Queen Mab speech, and an elegy by Paris.

== Performances ==
- A scene of Romeo killing Paris (played by Roberto Bisacco) was filmed for Franco Zeffirelli's Romeo and Juliet, but it was cut from the final print as Zeffirelli felt it unnecessarily made Romeo less sympathetic. Paris is not seen in the film after Juliet's first funeral, that could suggest he is alive. However, at the end of the film, Prince Escalus mentions he lost two relatives due to the feud between Montagues and Capulets, referring to Mercutio and Paris. Therefore, due to the cut scene of the fight between Romeo and Paris, it is implied that Paris may had died in mourn due to Juliet's death.
- A mock-Victorian revisionist version of Romeo and Juliet's final scene forms part of the 1980 stage-play The Life and Adventures of Nicholas Nickleby. This version has a happy ending: Romeo, Juliet, Mercutio and Paris are restored to life, and Benvolio reveals he is Paris' love, Benvolia, in disguise.
- In Baz Luhrmann's Romeo + Juliet, the character is named "Dave Paris" and is played by Paul Rudd. His familial relationship with Escalus (called "Captain Escalus Prince") is removed entirely from the film, and Dave Paris is not characterised as a nobleman; he is, rather, a wealthy business magnate and a governor's son. However, whilst neither the death of this incarnation of Paris nor his kinship with Captain Prince is ever made explicit, the latter yet laments at the close of the film that he has "lost a brace of kinsmen".
- In the 2011 film Gnomeo & Juliet, there is a Red Gnome named Paris who is arranged to court Juliet by her father Lord Redbrick, though she does not love him and is instead in love with a Blue Gnome named Gnomeo. Juliet distracts him with her frog sprinkler friend Nanette who is in love with Paris and the two later start a relationship. The character reappears in the film's 2018 sequel Sherlock Gnomes. He is voiced by Stephen Merchant.
- In the 2017 TV series Still Star-Crossed, Paris survives.
- In Tromeo and Juliet Paris appears Played by Steve Gibbons, reinterpreted as wealthy meat tycoon London Arbuckle. Arbuckle meets his end when he jumps out of a window after seeing Juliet transformed into a hideous cow monster by Friar Laurence’s potion.

== Bibliography ==
- Edgar, David (1982). The Life and Adventures of Nicholas Nickleby. New York: Dramatists' Play Service. ISBN 0-8222-0817-2.
- Halio, Jay (1998). Romeo and Juliet: A Guide to the Play. Westport: Greenwood Press. ISBN 0-313-30089-5.
- Hosley, Richard (1965). Romeo and Juliet. New Haven: Yale University Press.
- Levin, Harry (1960). "Form and Formality in Romeo and Juliet". Shakespeare Quarterly. 11 (1). Folger Shakespeare Library: 3–11. doi:10.2307/2867423. JSTOR 2867423.
- Moore, Olin H. (1930). "The Origins of the Legend of Romeo and Juliet in Italy". Speculum. 5 (3). Medieval Academy of America: 264–277. doi:10.2307/2848744. ISSN 0038-7134. JSTOR 2848744. S2CID 154947146.
- Moore, Olin H. (1937). "Bandello and "Clizia"". Modern Language Notes. 52 (1). Johns Hopkins University Press: 38–44. doi:10.2307/2912314. ISSN 0149-6611. JSTOR 2912314.
