= Characters in Romeo and Juliet =

Cast of the Shakespeare tragedy

William Shakespeare's tragic play Romeo and Juliet, set in Verona, Italy, features the eponymous protagonists Romeo Montague and Juliet Capulet. The cast of characters includes members of their respective families and households; Prince Escalus, the city's ruler, and his kinsmen, Count Paris and Mercutio; and various unaffiliated characters such as Friar Laurence and the Chorus. In addition, the play contains two ghost characters, Petruchio and Valentine, and an unseen character, Rosaline.

== House of Escalus ==
=== Prince Escalus ===
Prince Escalus, the Prince of Verona, attempts to de-escalate the conflict between the Capulets and Montagues through the rule of law. His character may be based on the historical Scaliger family which ruled Verona from 1262–1387, possibly on Bartolomeo I. He appears three times within the text, primarily to administer justice following major episodes of violence between the Capulet and Montague families.

In Act 1, Scene 1, the Prince admonishes both families for fighting in the streets, and introduces a new law: any Capulets or Montagues found guilty of breaking the peace will be executed. In Act 3, Scene 1, the Prince must arbitrate an appropriate punishment for the violent brawl in the streets, and the subsequent killings of Mercutio and Tybalt. Benvolio reveals that Tybalt both instigated the fight and first murdered Mercutio; Romeo therefore killed Tybalt in revenge for the death of his friend, not as part of the Capulet-Montague feud. The Prince lightens Romeo's sentence to lifetime banishment from Verona. In recompense for the death of Mercutio, his kinsman, he also punishes both families with a severe fine.

Prince Escalus returns in the final scene, Act 5, Scene 3, following the discovery of the bodies of Paris, Romeo, and Juliet in the Capulet family tomb. He pardons Friar Lawrence for his role in Juliet's death. He laments the feud that led to the deaths of Romeo and Juliet, and directs the families to come to peace with each other.

=== Count Paris ===
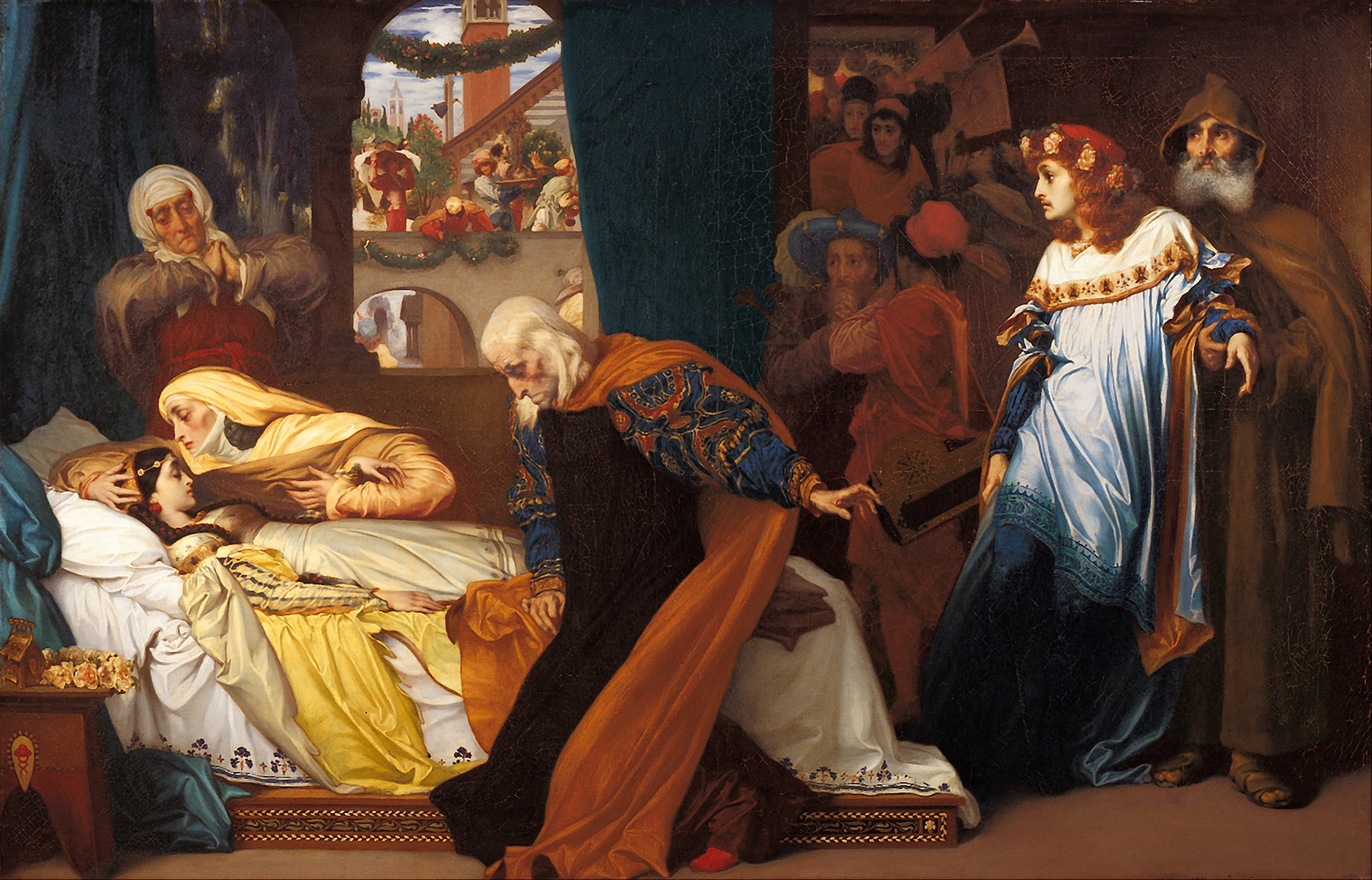
Frederic Leighton's 1850s painting depicting Count Paris (right) seeing Juliet apparently dead

Count Paris is a kinsman of Prince Escalus and seeks to marry Juliet. He is described as handsome, somewhat self-absorbed, and very wealthy.

Paris first appears in Act I, Scene II, where he tells Lord Capulet he wishes to marry Juliet.

=== Mercutio ===
Mercutio is a nobleman, the cousin of Prince Escalus and Count Paris. He is a close friend of Romeo and Benvolio. He supports the Montagues, and similarly antagonizes the Capulet family. His invitation to the Capulet's party reveals that he has a brother named Valentine. Mercutio typically makes long and fanciful speeches (the most famous of which is the Queen Mab speech), and is generally characterised as reckless, a jester, and a free spirit. Mercutio is one of Shakespeare's most popular characters. Mercutio is the instigator of many fights with his rather mean-spirited humour, and often insults Tybalt, a renowned Capulet swordsman. Mercutio is the first character to die.

In Act 3, Scene 1, Mercutio dismisses Benvolio's wishes to avoid running into the Capulets. Tybalt approaches Romeo and insults him, challenging him to a duel. However, Romeo, now secretly married to Juliet, refuses to fight Tybalt, as Tybalt is Juliet's cousin and therefore his kinsman. Not knowing this, Mercutio is incensed, and decides to fight Tybalt himself. Romeo, not wanting his best friend or his cousin-in-law to get hurt, intervenes by stepping between the two men. Tybalt fatally stabs Mercutio under Romeo's arm.

As he dies, Mercutio casts "a plague o' both your houses!". He makes one final pun before he dies: "Ask for me tomorrow, and you shall find me a grave man". In revenge for the murder of his friend, Romeo murders Tybalt.

== House of Capulet ==
The Capulet family (Italian: Capuleti or Cappelletti) in the play was named after a 13th-century political faction in Verona. The family name derives from the historical Cappelletti (Capuleti), a noble family mentioned by Dante Alighieri in connection with the Guelph–Ghibelline conflicts of medieval Italy. Although Shakespeare retains the family name, the play presents the feud as a private rivalry rather than an explicitly political conflict.

=== Lord Capulet ===
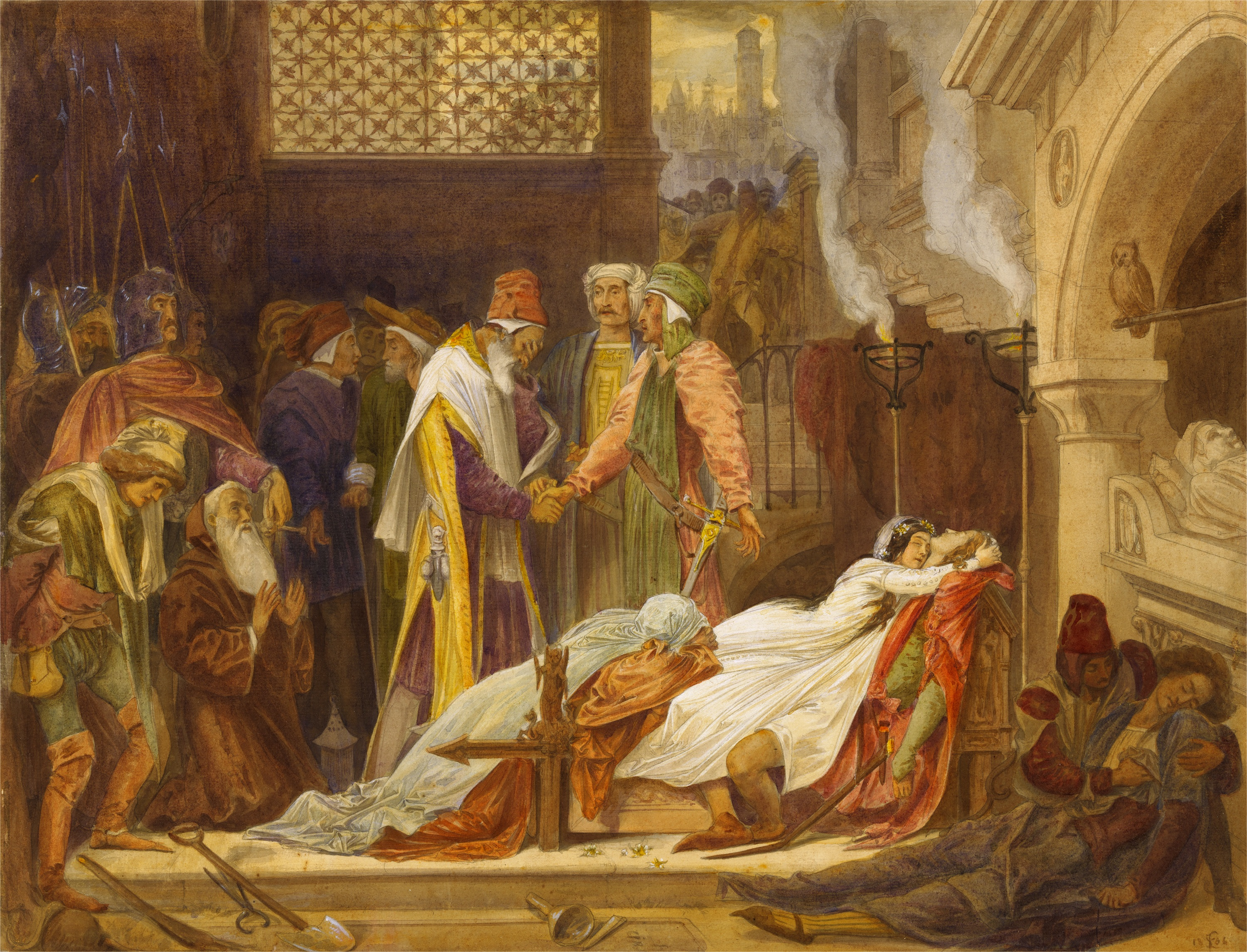
Frederic Leighton's 1854 watercolour The Reconciliation of the Montagues and Capulets

Lord Capulet is the patriarch of the Capulet family. He is Lady Capulet's husband, Juliet's father, and Tybalt's uncle. He is often commanding and short-tempered, but also convivial, as seen in Act 1, Scene 5, when he tells Tybalt not to antagonise Romeo at the Capulet masked ball, but escalates to insulting Tybalt when he disagrees.

Hang thee, young baggage! disobedient wretch!
I tell thee what: get thee to church o' Thursday,
Or never after look me in the face
And you be mine, I'll give you to my friend;
And you be not, hang, beg, starve, die in the streets!

— Capulet's ultimatum to Juliet, Romeo and Juliet

Capulet's treatment of Juliet changes across the course of the play. In Act 1, Scene 2, Capulet refuses to betroth Juliet to Count Paris on account of her youth, citing concerns over both Juliet's inexperience ("But saying o'er what I have said before: My child is yet a stranger in the world") and her health, if she became pregnant following the marriage ("And too soon marr'd are those so early made."). He tells Paris he would only agree to a marriage if Juliet desired it, and that Juliet has her own opinions separate to his ("My will to her consent is but a part;"). Furthermore, he suggests that Paris could try to woo any of the unmarried Capulet ladies he meets at the masked ball that evening ("hear all, all see, /And like her most whose merit most shall be") instead of pursuing a match with Juliet.

However, in Act 3, Scene 4, Capulet accepts Count Paris' proposal, and promises Paris that Juliet will be ruled by his wishes, even though the two have not met and Juliet remains in mourning. Later, in Act 3, Scene 5, Capulet thinks Juliet's sorrow is only due to Tybalt's death, and has Lady Capulet reveal Juliet's engagement to Paris. When Juliet refuses to become Paris' "joyful bride", Capulet becomes enraged. He threatens to make her a street urchin; calls her a "hilding", "unworthy", "young baggage", a "disobedient wretch", a "green-sickness carrion", and "tallow-face"; and says God's giving Juliet to them was a "curse" and he now realizes he and his wife had one child too many when Juliet was born. He chastises and insults Juliet for her disobedience, and threatens to disown her if she does not consent to the marriage on Thursday. In Act 4 Scene 2, Capulet at first treats Juliet coldly; he only becomes joyful after Juliet claims that she has not only agreed to the marriage, but even loves Paris, having met him when being counselled by Friar Lawrence ("Why, I am glad on't; this is well: stand up: /This is as't should be."). Later, Capulet is deeply upset by Juliet's death ("Death, that hath ta'en her hence to make me wail, /Ties up my tongue, and will not let me speak."). In the final scene, Act 5, Scene 3, Capulet asks Lord Montague to join their families as kin and to end the feud.

=== Lady Capulet ===
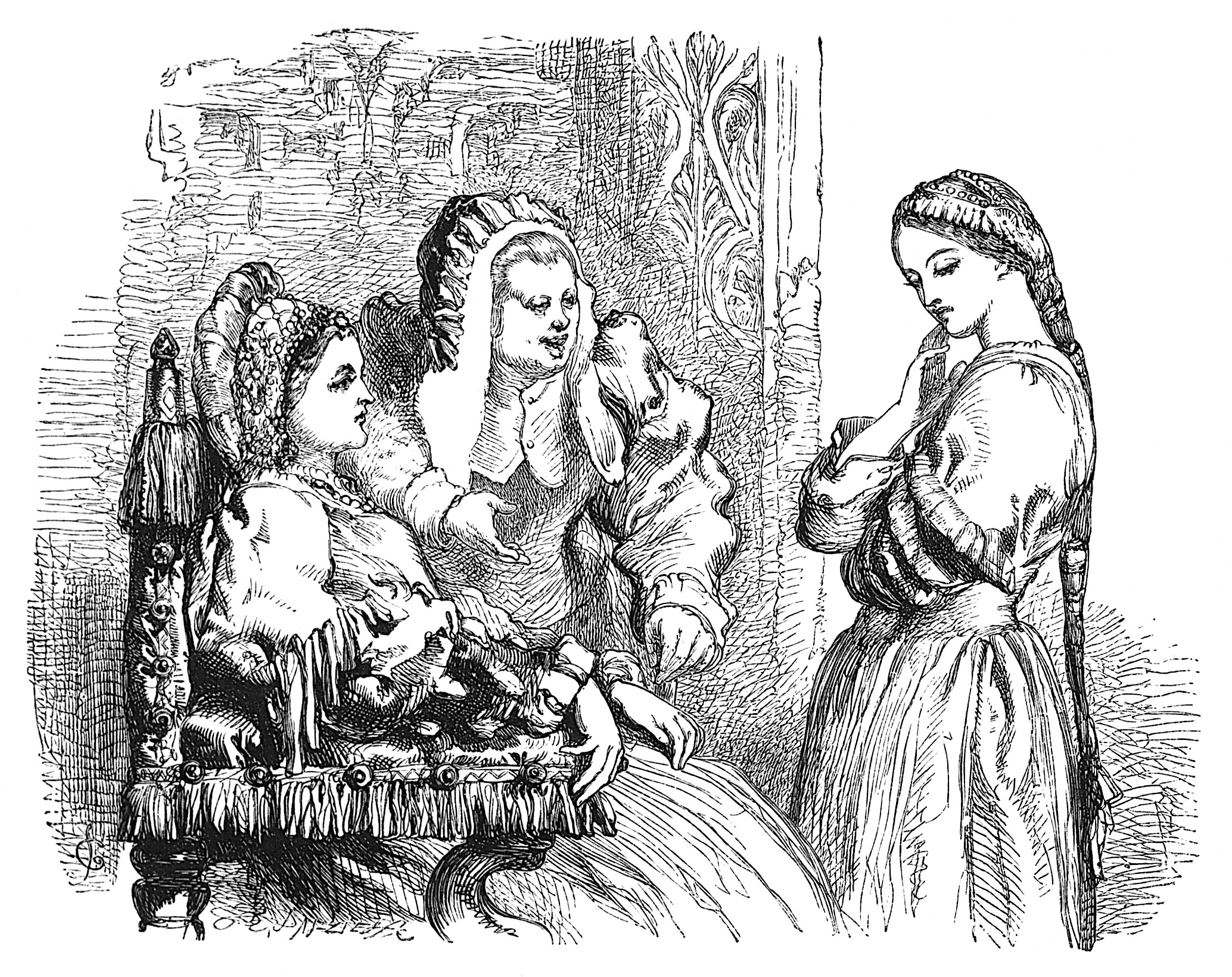
Lady Capulet and the Nurse persuade Juliet to marry Paris

Lady Capulet is the matriarch of the Capulet family. She is Capulet's wife, Juliet's mother, and Tybalt's aunt. She has a larger role than Lady Montague, appearing in several scenes.

In Act 1, Scene 3, she reveals that she was married to Lord Capulet and pregnant at a younger age than Juliet is now ("by my count, /I was your mother much upon these years /That you are now a maid."). In Act 1, Scene 2, Lord Capulet also reveals that Juliet is their only surviving child ("The earth hath swallow'd all my hopes but she"). Compared to the Nurse, Lady Capulet is often more reserved towards her daughter Juliet.

When Tybalt is killed in Act 3, Scene 1, she expresses both extreme grief and anger over Tybalt's death, insisting that the Prince have Romeo executed ("I beg for justice, which thou, prince, must give; Romeo slew Tybalt, Romeo must not live."). In Act 3, Scene 5, she offers to send a poisoner to kill Romeo at Mantua, and hopes that preparing the poison would console Juliet's grief ("Find thou the means, and I'll find such a man."). In this same scene, she becomes angry with Juliet for refusing to marry Paris; she dismisses Juliet's pleas to postpone the wedding, saying: "Talk not to me, for I'll not speak a word; do as thou wilt, for I am done with thee".

In Act 4, Scene 5, Lady Capulet is deeply distraught over Juliet's death ("Accursed, unhappy, wretched, hateful day!"). In Act 5, she is nearly overcome by the tragic events of the play, this is where the grief-stricken mother comes out.

The name of "Lady Capulet" is a later addition; it is an echo of Juliet's form of address in 3.5.65 ("my lady mother"). In the first texts, the character's stage direction and speech headings can be "mother", "wife", or even "old lady", but nowhere "Lady Capulet".

=== Juliet ===
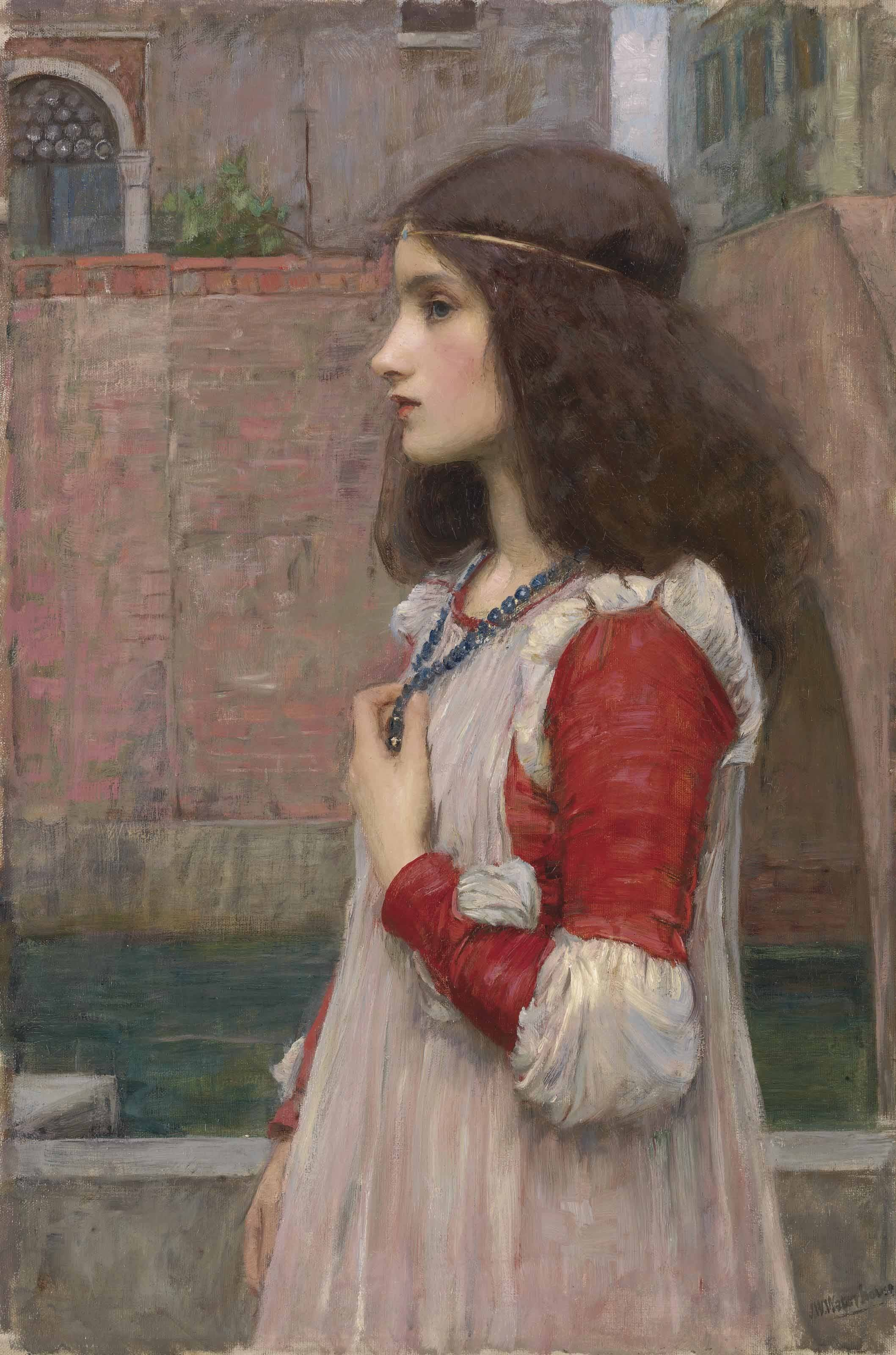
Juliet or The Blue Necklace (1898) by John William Waterhouse

Juliet Capulet, the female protagonist, is the only daughter of Lord and Lady Capulet. At the time of the play, she is almost fourteen years old. As a child, she was cared for by the Nurse, who remains her confidante.

Juliet dies by suicide at the end of the play, next to Romeo. Both their families realize what they had done by trying to separate the star-crossed lovers with the effect that the Capulets and Montagues are united, ending their feud.

=== Tybalt ===
Tybalt is Lord and Lady Capulet's nephew, and Juliet's hot-headed cousin. He is a skilled swordsman. He serves as an antagonist to the Montague characters. Tybalt is angered by Romeo and Benvolio's uninvited presence at the Capulet's masked ball. Mercutio repeatedly refers to Tybalt as the "Prince of Cats", ostensibly referring to Tybalt's speed and agility with in a duel. Mercutio is also mocking Tybalt: he shares a name with the character of Tibert/Tybalt, the "Prince of Cats", who features in the satirical Medieval and Early Modern literary cycles of Reynard the Fox. Moreover, the nickname may also refer to the Italian insult cazzo (pr. CAT-so), the equivalent of the English insult "dick".

Tybalt is first seen coming to the aid of his servants who are being attacked by the Montagues' servants. He is also present at Capulet's feast in Act 1, Scene 5, and is the first to recognize Romeo. His last appearance is in Act 3, Scene 1, wherein Mercutio insults Tybalt and ends up fighting with him. Tybalt kills Mercutio and, in retaliation, Romeo rages and kills Tybalt, resulting in Romeo's banishment.

=== Nurse ===
The Nurse is a major character in the play. She is Juliet's former wet nurse, having lost her own daughter of Juliet's age (Susan). As Juliet's primary caretaker and personal attendant, she is Juliet's confidante and acts as a warm maternal figure. There has been speculation about the Nurse's name, as Capulet may refer to her as "Angelica", but the line can be addressed to either the nurse or Lady Capulet.

=== Peter ===
Peter is a Capulet servant who appears loyal, and always quick to obey the nurse. The Nurse chastises him when he does not duel Mercutio for her honour, but Peter insists that he "saw no man use you a pleasure; if I had, / my weapon should quickly have been out". He appears again in Act 4, Scene 5 in a brief comic relief scene with a number of musicians.

=== Gregory and Sampson ===
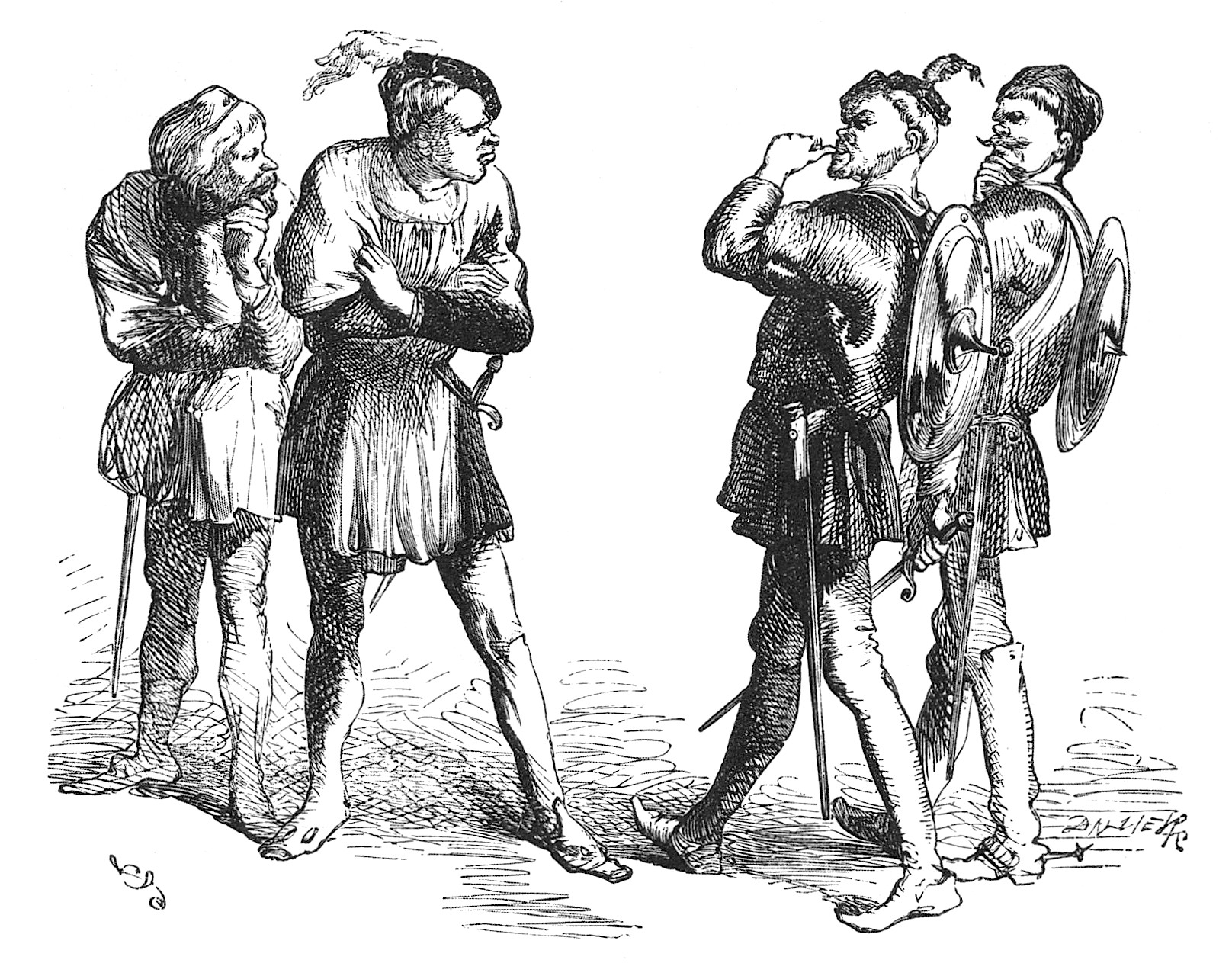
At the beginning of the play, Gregory and Sampson (right) quarrel with Abram and Balthazar.

Gregory and Sampson are Capulet servants. Gregory is originally hesitant to start a fight. Sampson, however, bites his thumb at Abram, "Which is a disgrace to them, if they bear it". The Montagues then retaliate in earnest. Benvolio arrives to break up the fight but ends up fighting with Tybalt. Both Gregory and Sampson appear to be friends of their master Tybalt.

In the opening scene, the two engage in a dialogue full of puns on "coal" and "eye", each intending to outdo the other and get each other ready to fight Montagues. The rhetorical form is called stichomythia, wherein characters participate in a short, quick exchanges of one-upmanship. Their discussion and brawl in this scene set the stage for the rivalry and conflict which fills the rest of the play.

=== Anthony, Potpan, unnamed Servants ===
Anthony, Potpan, and two other servants to the Capulet family play out a short comic scene in Act 1, Scene 5, arguing over the preparations for Capulet's feast. Capulet's servants are referenced again in Act 4, Scene 1, when Capulet orders them to begin preparations for the wedding of Juliet and Paris.

=== Servant to Capulet ===
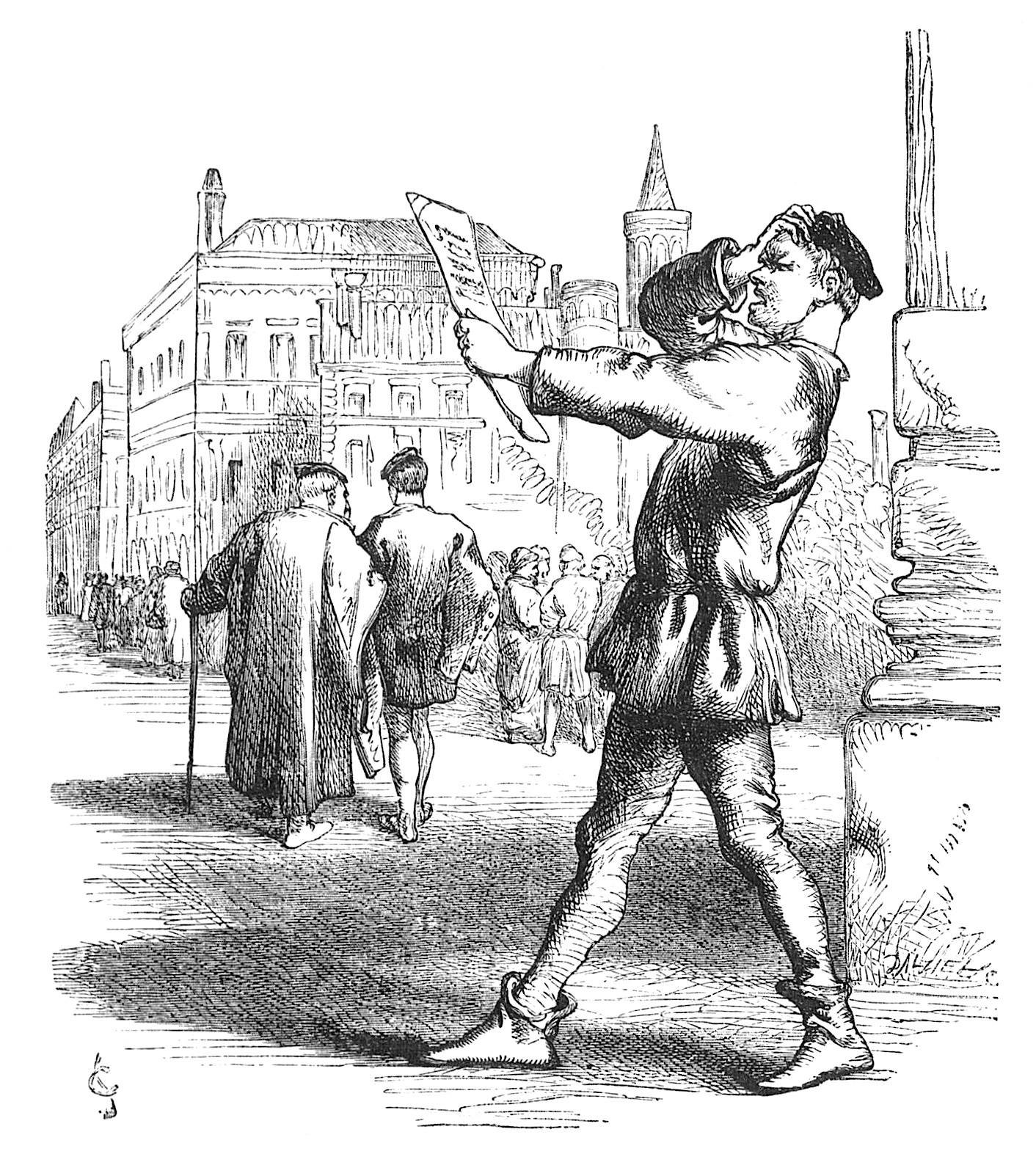
The hapless servant attempting to find the people named on a list he cannot read

A servant to Capulet is sent to deliver party invitations to a number of nobles and friends to Capulet. While walking, he comes upon Romeo and Benvolio and asks them to read the list for him, as he cannot read. As a thank you, he invites both to "come and crush a cup of wine," not realizing that they are Montagues. This character may have been intended to be the same as Peter, and is usually identified in scripts either as Peter or as a Clown.

=== Old Capulet ===
Old Capulet is Capulet's cousin. He appears as an elderly man sitting with Capulet in the feast.

== House of Montague ==
The Montague family (Italian: Montecchi) was a political faction of the 13th century. The family name derives from the historical Montecchi, a noble family also mentioned by Dante Alighieri among the factions involved in the Guelph–Ghibelline conflicts. Through Luigi da Porto's sixteenth-century novella, the names entered the literary tradition that culminated in Shakespeare's Romeo and Juliet.

The Montagues are generally portrayed as the 'better' of the two families, as they are not seen to be provoking fights and are often found trying to avoid fighting whenever they could, and occasionally found trying to dissuade the fighters to return to peace.

=== Lord Montague ===
The father of Romeo and uncle of Benvolio. He has the same social status as Lord Capulet, with whom he is in feud, and is also extremely wealthy. Montague clearly loves his son deeply and at the beginning of the play, worries for him as he recounts to Benvolio his attempts to find out the source of his depression. He wishes Benvolio better luck. After Romeo kills Tybalt, Montague pleads with the Prince to spare him of execution as Romeo did only what the law would have done, since Tybalt killed Mercutio. He appears again at the end of the play to mourn Romeo, having already lost his wife to grief.

=== Lady Montague ===
Montague's wife, the matriarch of the house of Montague, and the mother of Romeo. She appears twice within the play: in act one, scene one she first restrains Montague from entering the quarrel himself, and later speaks with Benvolio about the same quarrel. She returns with her husband and the Prince in act three, scene one to see what the trouble is, and is there informed of Romeo's banishment. She dies of grief offstage soon after (mentioned in act five). She is very protective of her son Romeo and is very happy when Benvolio tells her that Romeo was not involved in the brawl that happened between the Capulets and Montagues. However, Romeo does not feel close enough to her to seek advice from her. As with Capulet's wife, calling her "Lady Montague" is a later invention not supported by the earliest texts.

=== Romeo ===
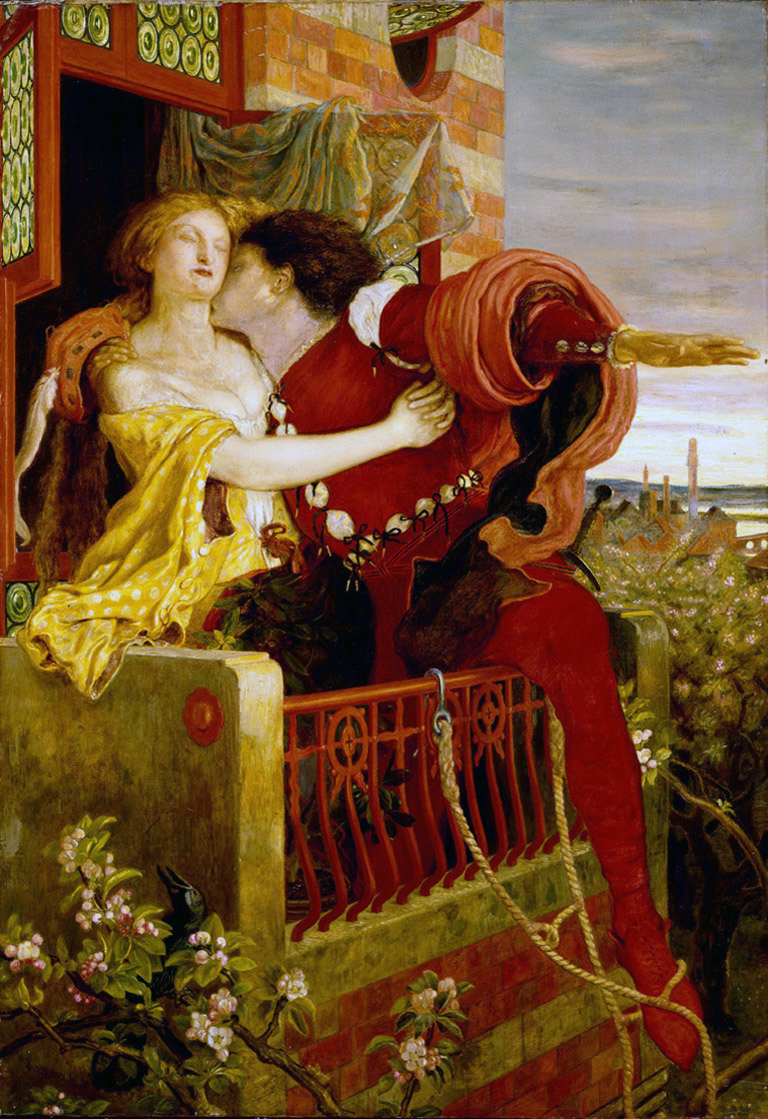
An 1870 oil painting by Ford Madox Brown depicting Romeo and Juliet's famous balcony scene

In the beginning of the play, Romeo, the male protagonist, pines for an unrequited love, Rosaline. To cheer him up, his cousin and friend Benvolio, and Mercutio, the Prince's nephew, take him to the Capulets' celebration in disguise, where he meets and falls in love with the Capulets' only daughter, Juliet. Later that night, he and Juliet meet secretly and pledge to marry, despite their families' long-standing feud. They marry the following day, but their union is soon thrown into chaos by their families; Juliet's cousin Tybalt duels and kills Mercutio, throwing Romeo into such a rage that he kills Tybalt, and the Prince of Verona subsequently banishes him. Meanwhile, Juliet's father plans to marry her off to Paris, a local aristocrat, within the next few days, threatening to turn her out on the streets if she doesn't follow through. Desperate, Juliet begs Romeo's confidant, Friar Laurence, to help her to escape the forced marriage. Laurence does so by giving her a potion that puts her in a deathlike coma. The plan works, but too soon for Romeo to learn of it; he genuinely believes Juliet to be dead, and so resolves to commit suicide, by drinking the bottle of poison (illegally bought from the Apothecary upon hearing the news of Juliet's "death"). Romeo's final words were "Thus with a kiss I die". He kills himself at Juliet's grave, moments before she awakes; she kills herself in turn shortly thereafter.

=== Benvolio ===
Montague's nephew and Romeo's cousin. Benvolio and Romeo are both friends of Mercutio, a kinsman to Prince Escalus. Benvolio seems to have little sympathy with the feud, trying unsuccessfully to back down from a fight with Tybalt, and the duels that end in Mercutio and Tybalt's death. Benvolio spends most of Act I attempting to distract his cousin from his infatuation with Rosaline, but following the first appearance of Mercutio in I.iv, he and Mercutio become more closely aligned until III.i. In that scene, he drags the fatally wounded Mercutio offstage, before returning to inform Romeo of Mercutio's death and the Prince of the course of Mercutio's and Tybalt's deaths. Benvolio then disappears from the play (though, as a Montague, he may implicitly be included in the stage direction in the final scene "Enter Lord Montague and others", and he is sometimes doubled with Balthasar). He ultimately disappears from the play without much notice, but is unique in that he is the only child of the new generation from either family to survive the play (as Romeo, Juliet, Paris, Mercutio, and Tybalt are dead).

=== Balthasar ===
Balthasar is Romeo's manservant and trusted friend. They have a brotherly relationship, which is identified when Balthasar tells Romeo that Juliet is "dead". While he is not directly referenced in the first scene of the play, the directions call for two Montague servants to quarrel with Sampson and Gregory. He then comes back in Act V Scene 1 telling Romeo that Juliet is "dead". Later Friar Laurence runs past Balthasar and asks him where Romeo is. Balthasar tells him that he is inside the Capulets' tomb. He later supports Friar Laurence's recollection of the preceding events by explaining that Romeo entered the tomb and demanded to be alone on pain of death.

=== Abram ===
Abram is a servant of the Montague household. He appears in Act 1, Scene 1, where he and another servant (presumably Balthasar) are provoked into a fight with Gregory and Sampson when the latter bites his thumb at them.

== Other characters ==
=== Friar Laurence ===
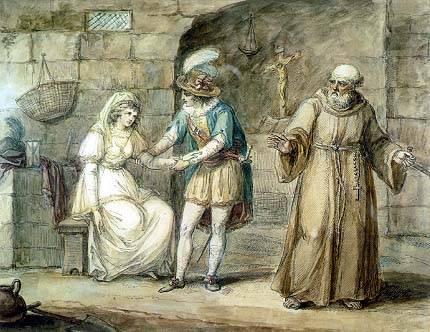
Romeo and Juliet with Friar Lawrence by Henry William Bunbury

Friar Laurence plays the part of an advisor and mentor to Romeo, along with aiding in major plot developments.

Alone, the innocent Friar gives us foreshadowing with his soliloquy about plants and their similarities to humans. When Romeo requests that the Friar marry him to Juliet, he is shocked, because only days before, Romeo had been infatuated with Rosaline, a woman who did not return his love. Nevertheless, Friar Lawrence decides to marry Romeo and Juliet in the attempt to end the civil feud between the Capulets and the Montagues.

When Romeo is banished and flees to Mantua for murdering Tybalt (who had previously murdered Mercutio), he tries to help the two lovers get back together using a death-emulating potion to fake Juliet's death. The Friar's letter to Romeo does not reach him because the people of Mantua suspect the messenger came from a house where the plague reigns, and the Friar is unable to arrive at the Capulet's monument in time. Romeo kills Count Paris, whom he finds weeping near Juliet's corpse, then commits suicide, by drinking poison that he bought from an impoverished apothecary, over what he thinks is Juliet's dead body. Friar Lawrence arrives just as Juliet awakes from her chemically induced slumber. He urges Juliet not to be rash, and to join a society of nuns, but he hears a noise from outside and then flees from the tomb. Juliet then kills herself with Romeo's dagger, completing the tragedy. The Friar is forced to return to the tomb, where he recounts the entire story to Prince Escalus, and all the Montagues and Capulets. As he finishes, the prince proclaims, "We have still known thee for a holy man".

=== Friar John ===
Friar John calls at the door of Friar Laurence's cell, "Holy Franciscan friar! brother, ho!" (5.2.1). Friar Laurence comes out and immediately asks about Romeo: "Welcome from Mantua! What says Romeo? / Or, if his mind be writ, give me his letter" (5.2.3–4). Friar John explains that he sought out another friar for company and found him in a house where he was visiting the sick, whereupon the health authorities, fearing there was pestilence in the house, confined both friars in the house so they wouldn't infect others. The authorities wouldn't even allow Friar John to use a messenger to send the letter back to Friar Laurence.

=== Chorus ===
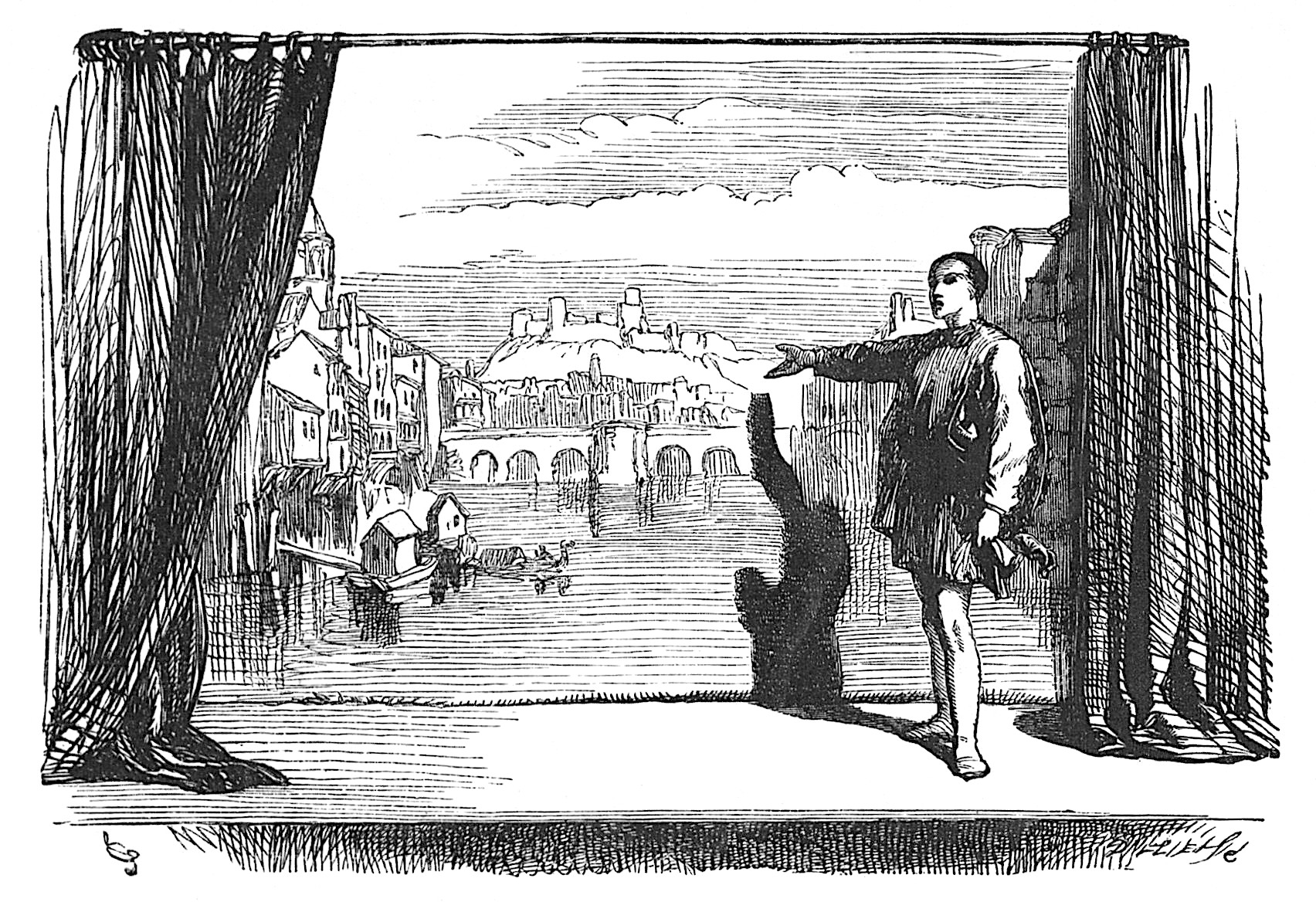
Woodcut of an actor portraying the Chorus delivering the prologue for the play

A Chorus gives the opening prologue and one other speech, both in the form of a Shakespearean sonnet.

The Chorus is an omniscient character. It appears at the top of the play to fill the audience in on the ancient quarrel between the, "Two households, both alike in dignity / In fair Verona, where we lay our scene". It returns as a prologue to act two to foreshadow the tragic turn of events about to befall the new romance between the title characters.

The Chorus only appears in the Quarto versions, not in the First Folio.

=== Watchmen ===
The Watch of Verona takes the form of three watchmen. The First Watch appears to be the constable, who orders the Second and Third to "search about the churchyard!" Unusual for a Shakespearean watch group, they appear to be a relatively intelligent unit, managing to capture and detain Balthasar and Friar Laurence in the churchyard. They then testify to the Prince to their role in the murder and suicide scene.

=== Musicians ===
Musicians serving in the Capulet household.

=== Citizens of Verona ===
A number of citizens emerge during Act I, Scene I to break apart the fight between some Capulet and Montague servants. They appear again in Act III, Scene I to discover the slain body of Tybalt, at which point they place Benvolio under citizen's arrest until the Prince's swift entrance.

== Unseen and ghost characters ==
=== Petruchio ===
Petruchio is a guest at the Capulet feast. He is notable only in that he is the only ghost character confirmed by Shakespeare to be present. When the party ends and Juliet inquires towards Romeo's identity, the Nurse attempts to avoid the subject by answering that Juliet is pointing at "the young Petruchio". Later, he is with Tybalt when he fatally wounds Mercutio, and a few scripts identify a Capulet with one line by that name. Petruchio is also the name of a major character in Shakespeare's earlier work, The Taming of the Shrew.

=== Rosaline ===
Rosaline in Zeffirelli's 1968 Romeo and Juliet, one of the few films to give her a visible role

Rosaline is an unseen character. She is Lord Capulet's niece. Romeo is initially infatuated with Rosaline, but laments that she continues to reject his advances, and has now sworn to live a life of chastity. Although silent, her role is important: Romeo first sees Juliet whilst trying to catch a glimpse of Rosaline at the Capulet masked ball.

Scholars generally compare Romeo's seemingly shallow desire for Rosaline with his later love of Juliet. Rosaline means "fair rose". The poetry Romeo composes for Rosaline is much weaker than that for Juliet. Scholars believe his early experience with Rosaline prepares him for his relationship with Juliet. Later performances of Romeo and Juliet have portrayed different interpretations of Romeo and Rosaline's relationship, with filmmakers experimenting by making Rosaline a more prominent character.

=== Valentine ===
Valentine is Mercutio's brother, briefly mentioned as a guest at the Capulet feast where Romeo and Juliet meet. He is a ghost character with no speaking parts, and his only possible appearance is at the Capulet feast among the guests. "Valentine" has been taken to mean "lover" or "brother", and is associated with these attributes in several stories and histories. Scholars have pointed out that Valentine is more strongly connected to a major character than other ghosts, as he is given a direct connection to his brother. Although he has a very small role in Shakespeare's play, earlier versions of the story gave him no role or mention at all. In fact, they gave even Mercutio a very minor role. Shakespeare was the first English dramatist to use the name "Valentine" on stage, in his earlier plays, Titus Andronicus and The Two Gentlemen of Verona. In Titus, Valentine plays a minor role, but in Two Gentlemen, he is one of the title characters. Incidentally, the Valentine of Two Gentlemen borrows heavily from Arthur Brooke's Romeus in The Tragicall Historye of Romeus and Juliet, which Shakespeare later used to create Romeo and Juliet. Brooke's version made Mercutio a rival for Juliet's love. Shakespeare's addition of Valentine as Mercutio's brother diffuses this rivalry. Thus, because the first time we hear of Mercutio he is associated with Valentine, rather than Juliet, he is changed from a rival to a friend and brotherly figure of Romeo.
