= List of films based on Romeo and Juliet =

William Shakespeare's play Romeo and Juliet has been adapted to film and television many times. Some of these adaptations include:

== Direct adaptations ==
- Romeo and Juliet, A Romantic Story of the Ancient Feud Between the Italian Houses of Montague and Capulet (1908); directed by J. Stuart Blackton (USA)
- Romeo and Juliet (1908); filmed extract from a performance at the Lyceum Theatre; director unknown (UK)
- Romeo e Giulietta (1908); directed by Mario Caserini (Italy)
- Romeo and Juliet (1911); first attempt to distil the entire narrative into a film; directed by Barry O'Neil (USA)
- Romeo e Giulietta (1912); pathécolor adaptation; directed by Ugo Falena (Italy)
- Romeo and Juliet (1916); first feature-length adaptation; directed by John W. Noble and Francis X. Bushman (USA)
- Romeo and Juliet (1916); released the same week as, and in direct competition with, the Noble and Bushman adaptation; directed by J. Gordon Edwards (USA)
- Romeo and Juliet (1924); the balcony scene filmed at a performance from the Regent Theatre, London; John Gielgud's film debut; director unknown (UK)
- Romeo and Juliet (1936); most expensive Shakespearean adaptation made up to that time; directed by George Cukor (USA)
- Scenes from Shakespeare's Romeo and Juliet (1937); first TV adaptation; directed by Royston Morley (UK)
- Julieta y Romeo (1939); directed by José María Castellví (Spain)
- Romeo and Juliet (1947); first full-length TV adaptation; directed by Michael Barry (UK)
- Romeo and Juliet (1947); directed by Akhtar Hussein (India)
- Romeo and Juliet (1949); TV adaptation for The Philco Television Playhouse; directed by Albert McCleery (USA)
- Romeo and Juliet (1954); directed by Renato Castellani (UK/Italy)
- Romeo and Juliet (1954); TV adaptation for Kraft Television Theatre; directed by Richard Dunlap (USA)
- Romeo e Giulietta (1954); made-for-TV movie; directed by Franco Enriquez (Italy)
- Romeo and Juliet (1955); TV adaptation for Sunday Night Theatre; directed by Harold Clayton (UK)
- Romeo and Juliet (1957); TV adaptation for Producers' Showcase, broadcast from The Old Vic; directed by Michael Benthall; directed for television by Clark Jones (USA)
- Romeo and Juliet (1962); five-part TV serialisation; directed by Prudence Nesbitt (UK)
- Romeo and Juliet (1964); directed by Riccardo Freda (Italy/Spain)
- Romeo en Julia (1964); made-for-TV movie; directed by Jack Dixon (Netherlands)
- Romeo und Julia (1964); made-for-TV movie; directed by Gerhard Klingenberg (West Germany)
- Romeo y Julieta (1966); made-for-TV movie; directed by María Herminia Avellaneda (Argentina)
- Romeo and Juliet (1966); filmed version of a stage performance from the Jerwood Vanbrugh Theatre; directed by Val Drumm and Paul Lee (UK)
- Romeo and Juliet (1967); TV adaptation for Play of the Month; directed by Alan Cooke (UK)
- Romeo and Juliet (1968); hugely successful adaptation both critically and commercially; directed by Franco Zeffirelli (UK/Italy)
- Romeo and Juliet (1969); made-for-TV production that never aired; directed by Gordon McDougall (UK)
- Romeo y Julieta (1972); made-for-TV movie; directed by José Antonio Páramo (Spain)
- Romeo to Jurietto (1977); anime TV adaptation for Manga Sekai Mukashi Banashi series; directed by Kyousuke Katsura (Japan)
- Romeo e Giulietta (1978); TV broadcast of a stage performance from the Verona Arena; directed by Orazio Costa and Siro Marcellini (Italy)
- Romeo & Juliet (1976); Thames Television; full-text production of 186 minutes; directed by Joan Kemp-Welch (UK)
- Romeo & Juliet (1978); TV adaptation for the BBC Television Shakespeare; directed by Alvin Rakoff (UK)
- Romeo y Julieta (1981); TV adaptation for Los especiales de ATC series (Argentina)
- The Tragedy of Romeo and Juliet (1982); straight-to-video production played out on an Elizabethan stage in a replica of the Globe Theatre; directed by William Woodman (USA)
- Romeo en Julia (1989); made-for-TV movie; directed by Berend Boudewijn and Dirk Tanghe (Netherlands)
- Romeo.Juliet (1990); a motion picture conceived and performed to acclaim as a film-in-concert to the score of Sergei Prokofiev's Romeo and Juliet (Prokofiev), which captures Shakespeare's timeless tale through the mesmerizing movements of feral cats with voiceovers by an all-star cast of British theater talent reciting extracts from the play; directed by Armondo Acosta (Belgium/UK).
- "Romeo and Juliet" (1992); TV adaptation for Shakespeare: The Animated Tales; directed by Yefim Gamburg (Russia/UK)
- Romeo & Juliet (1993); TV broadcast of a stage production from the Stratford Shakespeare Festival; directed by Richard Monette; directed for television by Norman Campbell (Canada)
- Romeo & Juliet (1994); five-part TV serialisation; directed by Alan Horrox (UK)
- Romeo + Juliet (1996); modernisation of the story, which retains Shakespeare's language but sets the play in "Verona Beach" in California; directed by Australian Baz Luhrmann (USA)
- Romeo och Julia (1996); made-for-TV movie; directed by Alexander Öberg (Sweden)
- Romeo and Juliet (2000); straight-to-video adaptation told from the point of view of Mercutio; directed by Colin Cox (USA)
- Romeo & Juliet (2013); 'traditional' adaptation of the play, with text adapted by Julian Fellowes; directed by Carlo Carlei (UK/Italy/Switzerland)
- Romeo and Juliet (2014); filmed version of a stage performance from the Richard Rodgers Theatre, directed by Don Roy King
- Romeo and Juliet in Harlem (2015 film), directed by Aleta Chapelle - "The first Shakespeare feature film adaptation of "Romeo and Juliet" with a complete cast of color that stays true to the language and storyline."
- Romeo and Juliet (2016 West End London play) (2016); filmed version, for live broadcast to cinemas, of 7 July 2016 stage performance from the Garrick Theatre, directed by Rob Ashford and Kenneth Branagh (UK)
- Romeo & Juliet (2021) is a production of the National Theatre of Great Britain which was filmed in an empty theatre over seventeen days during the COVID-19 global pandemic, directed by Simon Godwin.
- The Comedy of Romeo and Juliet (2021); filmed version of a stage performance, available for free on YouTube, recorded in July 2021 and released digitally December 7th, 2021, adapted and directed by Anthony Tresca.
- Juliet & Romeo (2025); a musical version of the story; directed by Timothy Scott Bogart (Italy/USA).

== Other adaptations ==
- Roméo et Juliette (1900); Romeo sings an aria from Charles Gounod's 1867 operatic adaptation of the play; directed by Clément Maurice (France)
- Romeo und Julia (1909); Juliet sings the waltz from Gounod's operatic adaptation; director unknown (Korea)
- Roméo se fait bandit (1909); comedy short set in contemporary Paris; directed by Romeo Bosetti (France)
- Romeo and Juliet in Our Town (1910); comedy short set in contemporary New York City; director unknown (USA)
- Indian Romeo and Juliet (1912); a boy from the Huron tribe falls in love with a girl from the Mohican tribe; directed by Laurence Trimble (Korea)
- Romiet and Julio (1915); animated short featuring stray cats; directed by John Randolph Bray (USA)
- Romeo and Juliet (1915); burlesque about an amateur dramatic society's attempts to stage the play; directed by Will Kellino (UK)
- Romeo and Juliet (1919); animated parody of the balcony scene; directed by Anson Dyer (UK)
- Romeo und Julia im Schnee (1920); comedy adaptation set in contemporary Bavaria; directed by Ernst Lubitsch (Germany)
- Romeo and Juliet (1920); burlesque directed by Vin Moore (USA)
- Doubling for Romeo (1921); a man falls asleep whilst reading Romeo and Juliet and dreams about people from his life morphing into characters from the play; directed by Clarence G. Badger (USA)
- Romeo and Juliet (1924); parody of the balcony scene; directed by Reggie Morris and Harry Sweet (USA)
- A Rarin' Romeo (1925); comedy short in which a bumbling actor causes chaos during a production of the play; directed by Archie Mayo (USA)
- Drama Deluxe (1927); comedy short in which an actor causes the set to collapse during a production of the play; directed by Norman Taurog (USA)
- Felix the Cat as Romeeow (1927); part of Pat Sullivan's Felix the Cat series; directed by Otto Messmer (USA)
- The Hollywood Revue of 1929; features two versions of the balcony scene, one a serious recitation of Shakespeare, the other a parody using contemporary slang; directed by Charles Reisner (USA)
- Romeo and Juliet (1933); animated short; directed by Frank Moser (USA)
- Shakespearean Spinach (1940); animated short which sees Popeye as Romeo and Olive Oyl as Juliet; directed by Dave Fleischer (USA)
- Romeo in Rhythm (1940); animated short; directed by Rudolf Ising (USA)
- Shuhaddaa el gharam (1942); set in contemporary Egypt; released in the US as Victims of Love and in the UK as Romeo and Juliet; directed by Kamal Selim (Egypt)
- Romeo y Julieta (1943); recasts the play as a farce; directed by Miguel M. Delgado (Mexico)
- Les amants de Vérone (1949); during the shooting of a major new film version of the play, the lives of two actors begin to mirror the plot; directed by André Cayatte (France)
- Tong lin niao (1950); set in modern Tibet; not released until 1955; directed by Doe Ching (China)
- Beneath the 12-Mile Reef (1953); the son of a small-time fisherman falls in love with the daughter of the man trying to put his father out of business; directed by Robert D. Webb (USA)
- Romeo i Dzhulyetta (1955); film adaptation of the Bolshoi Ballet performing Sergei Prokofiev's 1935 ballet adaptation of the play; directed by Lev Arnshtam (Russia)
- Giulietta and Romeo (1955); TV comedy adaptation for Conrad Nagel Theatre; relocates the story to a modern Italian village; directed by John Mantley (USA)
- The Same Sky (1956); TV adaptation for Armchair Theatre; modernisation in which the daughter of an orthodox Jewish family falls in love with the son of a Christian family; directed by Dennis Vance (UK)
- Romeo i Julija (1958); animated short which relocates the story to a prehistoric milieu; directed by Ivo Vrbanic (Yugoslavia)
- Romeo, Julia a tma (1960); set during the Nazi occupation of Czechoslovakia, a young student falls in love with the Jewish girl he is hiding from the authorities; directed by Jiří Weiss (Czechoslovakia)
- Romanoff and Juliet (1961); political satire which filters the play through a Cold War milieu; directed by Peter Ustinov (USA)
- West Side Story (1961); musical set in 1950s New York City, where a member of a local gang falls in love with the sister of the leader of a rival gang; directed by Robert Wise and Jerome Robbins (USA)
- Los Tarantos (1963); adaptation of Alfredo Mañas' 1962 play, Historia de los Tarantos, inspired by Romeo and Juliet but transferring the story to the gypsy community (in the slums) of Barcelona in the 1960s; directed by Francisco Rovira Beleta (Spain)
- Romeo and Juliet: A Ballet After William Shakespeare (1965); TV broadcast of a stage production of John Cranko's ballet to Prokofiev's score, from the Place des Arts; directed by Norman Campbell (Canada)
- Romeo and Juliet (1966); filmic adaptation of The Royal Ballet production of Kenneth MacMillan's ballet to Prokofiev's score; directed by Paul Czinner, featuring Margot Fonteyn as Juliet and Rudolph Nureyev as Romeo (UK)
- Kako su se voleli Romeo i Julija? (1966); set in contemporary Belgrade, the son of a wealthy family falls in love with the daughter of a family from the slums; directed by Jovan Zivanovic (Yugoslavia)
- Romeo si Julieta (1968); animated short; directed by Bob Călinescu (Romania)
- Romeo of the Spirits (1976); short film depicting the day in the life of an alcoholic tramp who was once a celebrated Shakespearean actor; directed by Nikolas L. Janis (UK)
- The Bolshoi Ballet: Romeo and Juliet (1976); TV broadcast of the Bolshoi Ballet performing Prokofiev's ballet adaptation; directed by John Vernon (UK)
- Sieben Sommersprossen (1978); a 14-year-old girl and 15-year-old boy fall in love at a holiday camp, despite the best efforts of the adults to keep them apart; directed by Herrmann Zschoche (East Germany)
- Romeo and Juliet (1978); made-for-TV production of Prokofiev's ballet adaptation; directed by Merrill Brockway (USA)
- Maro Charitra (1978); set in contemporary India, a Hindi-speaking girl falls in love with a Tamil-speaking neighbour; directed by K. Balachander (India)
- Mônica e Cebolinha: No Mundo de Romeu e Julieta (1978); theatrical version of the play featuring the characters from Monica and Friends; directed by José Amâncio (Brazil)
- Runaway Robots! Romeo-0 and Julie-8 (1979); animated short telling the story of two robots from rival robot manufacturing companies who fall in love; directed by Clive A. Smith (Canada)
- Romeu e Julieta (1980); TV adaptation which modernises the story and relocates it to the town of Ouro Preto; directed by Paulo Afonso Grisolli (Brazil)
- Vam i ne snilos... (1981); set in contemporary Moscow, two high school students fall in love, much to the chagrin of their parents; directed by Ilya Frez (Russia)
- Ek Duuje Ke Liye (1981); remake of Maro Charitra; directed by K. Balachander (India)
- Shiriusu no densetsu (1981); animated film in which the prince of the Water Children falls in love with a Fire Child; directed by Masami Hata (Japan)
- Roméo et Juliette (1982); TV broadcast of a stage production of Gounod's operatic adaptation from the Paris Opera; directed by Yves-André Hubert (France)
- Romeo and Juliet (1983); TV broadcast of a stage production of Prokofiev's ballet adaptation by the Royal Winnipeg Ballet; directed by James E. Jones; directed for television by Norman Campbell (Canada)
- Romeo and Juliet on Ice (1983); TV adaptation with the story told through figure skating; directed by Robert Iscove (USA)
- Romeo e Giulietta (1983); TV broadcast of a stage production of Prokofiev's ballet adaptation from the Palazzetto dello Sport; directed by Rudolf Nureyev (Italy/UK)
- Romeo and Juliet (1984); TV broadcast of a stage production of Kenneth MacMillan's ballet to Prokofiev's score, from the Royal Opera House; directed by Colin Nears (UK)
- Romeo i Julija (1984); animated short in which the play is performed by a group of monsters; directed by Dušan Petričić (Yugoslavia)
- Narekohme gi Monteki i Kapuleti (1985); animated film about two warring families whose children fall in love; directed by Donyo Donev (Bulgaria)
- China Girl (1987); an Italian boy falls in love with a Chinese girl, leading to gang warfare between their respective communities; directed by Abel Ferrara (USA)
- Qayamat Se Qayamat Tak (1988); a long-standing blood feud between two families is complicated when the son of one falls in love the daughter of the other; directed by Mansoor Khan (India)
- Rami og Julie (1988); a Palestinian refugee living in Copenhagen is rescued from a gang of racist thugs by a young woman with whom he falls in love; directed by Erik Clausen (Denmark)
- Montoyas y Tarantos (1989); adaptation of Alfredo Mañas' 1962 play, Historia de los Tarantos, inspired by Romeo and Juliet; directed by Vicente Escrivá (Spain)
- Romuald et Juliette (1989); a white businessman falls in love with his black housekeeper; directed by Coline Serreau (France)
- Torn Apart (1990); during the Israeli–Palestinian conflict, an Israeli Jew falls in love with a Palestinian woman; directed by Jack Fisher (USA/Israel)
- Romeo and Juliet (1990); TV broadcast of a stage production of Gounod's operatic adaptation from the Creighton Orpheum Theater; directed by Leon Major; directed for television by Michael Farrell (USA)
- Godfather (1991); loosely adapts the tale of a young couple, from warring families, falling in love; directed by Siddique-Lal (India)
- Romeo & Julia (1992); low budget straight-to-video comedy adaptation; directed by Kevin Kaufman (USA)
- Romeo and Juliet (1992); TV broadcast of a stage production of Prokofiev's ballet adaptation, performed by the Northern Ballet Theatre; directed by Kriss Rusmanis (UK)
- Keyamat Theke Keyamat (1993); a long-standing blood feud between two influential families is complicated when the son of one named Raj played by Salman Shah falls in love with the daughter of the other named Reshmi played by Mousumi; directed by Sohanur Rahman Sohan (Bangladesh)
- The Punk (1993); set in modern-day London, a homeless young man falls in love with the daughter of a wealthy family, much to the horror of her parents; directed by Mike Sarne (UK)
- Roméo et Juliette (1995); TV broadcast of a stage production of Gounod's operatic adaptation from the Royal Opera House; directed by Brian Large (UK)
- Tromeo and Juliet (1996); transgressive comedy adaptation in which Romeo and Juliet discover they are brother and sister; directed by Lloyd Kaufman and James Gunn (USA)
- Love Is All There Is (1996); comedy modernisation set in The Bronx, where the children of two rival restaurateurs fall in love; directed by Joseph Bologna and Renée Taylor (USA)
- Ronnie & Julia (1997); made-for-TV comedy in which the children of two rival politicians fall in love; directed by Philip Spink (USA)
- Shakespeare in Love (1998); the (fictitious) story behind the composition of Romeo and Juliet; directed by John Madden (UK/USA)
- The Lion King II: Simba's Pride (1998); animated film which tells the story of a young female lion who befriends a young male from a banished tribe; directed by Darrell Rooney and Rob LaDuca (USA)
- Solomon & Gaenor (1999); in a Welsh mining village in 1911, a young Jewish man falls in love with a Christian girl; directed by Paul Morrison (UK)
- Romeo Must Die (2000); an ex-cop falls in love with the daughter of the man he believes responsible for the death of his brother; directed by Andrzej Bartkowiak (USA)
- Jiyuan qiaohe (2000); the son and daughter of two rival families in the chicken rice trade unexpectedly fall in love; directed by CheeK (Singapore)
- Alaska.de (2000); set in East Berlin in the 1980s, a young girl living with her father falls in love with a tough street kid; directed by Esther Gronenborn (Germany)
- Romeo e Giulietta (2000); TV broadcast of a stage production of Prokofiev's ballet adaptation from La Scala; directed by Tina Protasoni (Italy)
- Brooklyn Babylon (2001); modernisation of the story set during the Crown Heights riot; directed by Marc Levin (USA)
- Roméo & Juliette, de la haine à l'amour (2002); TV version of Gérard Presgurvic's 2001 musical adaptation of the play; directed by Redha and Gilles Amado (France)
- Amar te duele (2002); contemporary Mexican retelling of the story; directed by Fernando Sariñana (Mexico)
- Barrio Wars (2002); straight-to-video modernisation of the story which relocates the events to a Los Angeles barrio; directed by Paul Wynne (USA)
- Bollywood Queen (2002); comedy modernisation of the story set in London where a young Indian girl falls in love with a Scottish guitarist; directed by Jeremy Wooding (UK)
- Roméo et Juliette (2002); heavily truncated made-for-TV production of Gounod's operatic adaptation; directed by Barbara Willis Sweete (France/UK/USA)
- Didi, o Cupido Trapalhão (2003); a modernized version that follows the story of a clumsy angel who is given the mission of uniting a couple called Romeo and Juliet and the film also makes reference to the couple's poisoning at the end of the story; directed by Paulo Aragão and Alexandre Boury (Brazil)
- Romeo & Julia und die neue Weltordnung (2004); short comedy in which the President of the USA's daughter falls in love with Osama bin Laden's son; directed by Thorsten Wettcke (Germany)
- O Casamento de Romeu e Julieta (2005); comedy in which a die-hard football fan falls in love with the daughter of the chairman of his team's arch rivals; directed by Bruno Barreto (Brazil)
- Roméo et Juliette (2005); TV broadcast of Hector Berlioz's 1839 choral symphony adaptation of the play from the Royal Albert Hall; directed by Charlotte Gazzard (UK)
- Pizza My Heart (2005); made-for-TV comedy in which the son of a pizza making family in New York City falls in love with the daughter of the family's great rival; directed by Andy Wolk (USA)
- West Bank Story (2005); comedy short spoof of West Side Story; directed by Ari Sandel (2005)
- Wellkåmm to Verona (2006); comedy in which a retired theatre director casts himself as Romeo in the hopes of having his leading lady fall in love with him; directed by Suzanne Osten (Sweden)
- 56 csepp vér (film)(2006); Hungarian movie tells the story of Romeo and Juliet, but in the Hungarian Revolution of 1956.
- Roméo et Juiette (2006); modernisation set in contemporary Quebec; directed by Yves Desgagnés (Canada)
- Romeo & Juliet: Sealed with a Kiss (2006); animated adaptation which sets the story underwater and features two young seals falling in love; directed by Phil Nibbelink (USA)
- Rockin' Romeo & Juliet (2006); musical film in which Romeo is a modern rock star wooing Juliet with his singing ability; directed by David McGaw (USA)
- Romeo and Juliet: A Monkey's Tale (2006); fictional-documentary in which two monkeys from rival cliques fall in love; directed by Karina Holden (Australia)
- Guca! (2006); at the annual Guča Trumpet Festival, a Serb girl falls in love with a Romani boy; directed by Dusan Milic (Serbia)
- Romeo y Julieta (2007); TV series in the style of a soap opera; created by Ana Franco and Marcelo Nacci (Argentina)
- Saints & Sinners (2007); telenovela set in modern-day Miami Beach, where the son of a powerful local family falls in love with the daughter of a rival family; created by Ted Koland (USA)
- Romeo × Juliet (2007); anime television mini-series set in the future city of Neo Verona; created by Reiko Yoshida (Japan)
- Gounod's Roméo et Juliette (2007); live screening of a stage production of Gounod's operatic adaptation from the Metropolitan Opera; directed by Guy Joosten; directed for television by Gary Halvorson (USA)
- Romeo and Juliet with the Royal Ballet (2007); TV broadcast of a stage production of Kenneth MacMillan's ballet to Prokofiev's score, from the Royal Opera House; directed by Ross MacGibbon (UK)
- Bring It On: In It to Win It (2007); Dir: Steve Rash. Starring Ashley Benson and Cassandra Scerbo, with Noel Zreizaga, Jennifer Tisdale, and Michael Copon. As tension mounts between the two rival cheer squads, the Sharks and the Jets, Shark cheer captain Carson falls for fellow cheerleader Penn, not realizing he's a Jet. (USA)
- uGugu no Andile (2008); TV mini-series set in Thokoza during the apartheid negotiations, where a Xhosa boy falls in love with a Zulu girl; created by Lodi Matsetela and Minky Schlesinger (South Africa)
- Roméo et Juliette (2008); TV broadcast of a stage production of Gounod's operatic adaptation from the Felsenreitschule; directed by Bartlett Sher (Austria)
- Romeo & Juliet vs. The Living Dead (2009); a young girl falls in love with a zombie, much to the horror of her (living) family and friends and his (dead) family and friends; directed by Ryan Denmark (USA)
- Romeo & Julio (2009); relocates the story to a breakdancing milieu, and changes Juliet to a young man; directed by Ivan Peric (Croatia)
- Twilight Saga: New Moon (2009); Second book in series alludes to romeo and juliet; Directed by ((Chris Weitz)) ((US))
- Maro Charitra (2010); remake of Maro Charitra; directed by Ravi Yadav (India)
- Camp Rock 2: The Final Jam (2010); TV film; directed by Paul Hoen (USA)
- Gnomeo & Juliet (2011); animated film in which a gnome living in the garden of the Montague family falls in love with a gnome living in the garden of the Capulet family; directed by Kelly Asbury (UK)
- Romeo and Juliet in Yiddish (2011); in modern-day Williamsburg, Brooklyn a young man from a Satmar family falls in love with a young woman from a Chabad family; directed by Eve Annenberg (USA)
- William (2012); comedy short in which William Shakespeare's mother tells him to rewrite the ending of Romeo and Juliet because it is too sad; directed by Sam Lara (Australia)
- Warm Bodies (2013); contemporary zombie comedy in which a young girl falls in love with a zombie; directed by Jonathan Levine (USA)
- Make Your Move 3D (2013); dance film loosely based on the play; directed by Duane Adler (USA)
- Goliyon Ki Raasleela Ram-Leela (2013); set in a fictional India where violence is an everyday occurrence, the son of a gun-running family falls in love with the daughter of a rival family; directed by Sanjay Leela Bhansali (India)
- Rome & Juliet (2017); webseries adaptation set in a fictional high school with rivalry between a tea shop and a coffee shop; changes all characters to female; created by the Outtakes on YouTube (USA)
- Little Italy (2018); Dir: Donald Petrie. Starring Hayden Christensen and Emma Roberts, with Alyssa Milano, Danny Aiello and Andrea Martin. Rival pizza shop families in Toronto's Little Italy neighborhood eventually find common ground when two young (as well as two senior) members of each family fall in love. (Canada)
- &Juliet (2019 musical); Author: David West Read. A West-End and Broadway musical where Anne Hathaway negotiates with her husband, William Shakespeare, to rewrite the play to Romeo and Juliet so that Juliet does not kill herself, instead making this the beginning of the play.(Manchester, UK)
- West Side Story (2021 film) is a modern musical retelling of West Side Story, reimagining Shakespeare’s Romeo and Juliet through the lens of racial tension, urban displacement, and youth violence in 1950s New York; directed by Steven Spielberg (USA)
- Rosaline (2022 film); a comedic retelling of Romeo and Juliet from the viewpoint of Rosaline, the woman Romeo loved before Juliet; directed by Karen Maine (USA)

== See also ==
- Romeo and Juliet (disambiguation)
- List of William Shakespeare screen adaptations
- Romeo and Juliet on screen
