= Romeo and Juliet (disambiguation) =

Romeo and Juliet is a tragedy by William Shakespeare.

Romeo and Juliet or Romeo & Juliet may also refer to:

== Ballets ==
- Romeo and Juliet, a ballet score by Constant Lambert
- Romeo and Juliet (Prokofiev), a 1935 ballet score by Sergei Prokofiev and choreographed by Leonid Lavrovsky and with Konstantin Sergeyev in 1940
  - Romeo and Juliet, a 1955 ballet by Frederick Ashton
  - Romeo and Juliet (Cranko), a 1962 ballet by John Cranko
  - Romeo and Juliet (MacMillan), a 1965 ballet by Kenneth MacMillan
  - Romeo and Juliet (Neumeier), a 1971 ballet by John Neumeier
  - Romeo and Juliet (Nureyev), a 1977 ballet by Rudolf Nureyev
  - Romeo and Juliet, a 1979 ballet by Yuri Grigorovich
  - Romeo and Juliet (Lavery), a 1991 setting of the balcony scene by Sean Lavery
  - Roméo et Juliette, a 1996 ballet by Jean-Christophe Maillot
  - Romeo + Juliet (ballet) (or Romeo † Juliet), a 2007 ballet by Peter Martins
  - Romeo and Juliet (Pastor), a 2008 ballet by Krzysztof Pastor
  - Romeo and Juliet (Ratmansky), a 2011 ballet by Alexei Ratmansky, commissioned by the National Ballet of Canada

== Film ==
- Films titled Romeo and Juliet:
  - Romeo and Juliet (1900 film)
  - Romeo and Juliet (1908 film)
  - Romeo and Juliet (1916 Metro Pictures film)
  - Romeo and Juliet (1916 Fox film)
  - Romeo and Juliet (1936 film)
  - Romeo and Juliet (1940 film)
  - Romeo and Juliet (1954 Argentine film)
  - Romeo and Juliet (1954 film)
  - Romeo and Juliet (1955 film), a ballet film based on Lavrovsky's choreography
  - Romeo and Juliet (1968 film), directed by Franco Zeffirelli
- Romeo, Juliet and Darkness, a 1960 Czech drama film
- The Tragedy of Romeo and Juliet (film), 1982
- Romeo.Juliet, 1990 film
- Romeo and Juliet in Sarajevo, a 1994 documentary film about the deaths of Admira Ismić and Boško Brkić
- Romeo + Juliet, 1996 film
- Tromeo and Juliet, a 1997 film
- Romeo & Juliet: Sealed with a Kiss, 2006 animated feature film
- Gnomeo & Juliet, a 2011 film
- Romeo & Juliet (2013 film)
- Romeo Juliet (2002 film), a Kannada romance film
- Romeo Juliet (2015 film), a Tamil romantic comedy film
- Romeo Juliet (2017 film), an Indian Odia-language romance comedy
- Juliet & Romeo (2025 film), a 2025 musical feature film

== Television ==
- BBC Television Shakespeare Season One – "Romeo & Juliet" (1978)
- Romeo y Julieta (TV series), a 2007 Argentina soap opera
- Romeo × Juliet, a 2007 anime television series by Gonzo

== Music ==
=== Albums ===
- Romeo and Juliet (album), a 1977 album by Alec R. Costandinos and the Syncophonic Orchestra
- Romeo ja Julia, a 1994 album by Finnish eurodance and pop band Movetron
- Romeo + Juliet (soundtrack), a soundtrack album to the 1996 film of the same name

=== Songs ===
- Love Theme from Romeo and Juliet, the main theme written by Johnny Mercer and Henry Mancini from the 1968 film Romeo and Juliet
- "Romeo and Juliet" (Alec R. Costandinos song), a 1978 song, featuring the Syncophonic Orchestra
- "Romeo and Juliet" (Dire Straits song), a 1980 song
- "Romeo and Juliet" (Blue System song), a 1992 song
- "Romeo and Juliet" (Sylk-E. Fyne song), a 1998 song
- "(Just Like) Romeo and Juliet", a 1964 song by doo-wop group The Reflections
- "Romeo & Juliet", a 2010 song by Hey! Say! JUMP
- "Romeo & Juliet", a song by American rapper Trippie Redd from the 2017 mixtape A Love Letter to You
- "Romeo & Juliet", a song by Danish pop duo S.O.A.P. from the 1998 album Not Like Other Girls
- "Romeo Had Juliette", a song by Lou Reed from the 1989 album New York
- "Romeo ja Julia", a song by Movetron from the 1994 album of the same name
- "Juliet & Romeo", a 2019 song by Martin Solveig and Roy Woods

=== Other compositions ===
- Romeo and Juliet, incidental music by Anna Schuppe (1829–1903)
- Roméo et Juliette (Berlioz), a 1839 choral symphony by Hector Berlioz
- Romeo and Juliet (Tchaikovsky), a fantasy-overture first published in 1870 by Pyotr Ilyich Tchaikovsky
- Romeo and Juliet (Prokofiev), a 1935 ballet score by Sergei Prokofiev, later compiled into three suites

== Operas and musicals ==
- Romeo und Julie, a 1776 opera by Georg Benda
- Giulietta e Romeo, a 1796 opera by Niccolò Antonio Zingarelli
- Giulietta e Romeo (Vaccai), an 1825 opera by Nicola Vaccai
- I Capuleti e i Montecchi, an 1830 opera by Vincenzo Bellini
- Roméo et Juliette, an 1867 opera by Charles Gounod
- A Village Romeo and Juliet, a 1907 opera by Frederick Delius
- Romeo und Julia, a 1940 opera by Heinrich Sutermeister
- Romeo und Julia (Blacher opera), 1943, by Boris Blacher
- Roméo et Juliette, de la Haine à l'Amour, a 2001 musical by Gérard Presgurvic
- Giulietta e Romeo (musical), a 2007 musical by Riccardo Cocciante and Pasquale Panella
- Romeo & Julia (Estonian musical)

== Tobacco ==
- Romeo y Julieta (cigar), a Cuban and a Dominican cigar brand
- Romeo y Julieta (cigarette), a Cuban cigarette brand

== Miscellaneous ==
- Romeo and Juliet (swans), a homosexual swan couple residing in Boston's Public Garden
- Romeo and Juliet, informal name for a fossil assemblage of two Khaan dinosaurs
- The Tragical History of Romeus and Juliet, 1562 Arthur Brooke poem, Shakespeare's source
- Romiette and Julio, a 2001 Sharon Draper young adult novel
- Romeo and Juliet (Yuzuru Hanyu program), Olympic free skate program
- Romeo and Juliet laws, an unofficial name for some statutory rape laws
- Romeu e Julieta, Brazilian dessert made of guava jam and cheese

== See also ==
- Romeo and Juliet on screen
- Juliet (disambiguation)
- Juliet Capulet
- Romeo (disambiguation)
- Romeo Montague
