= Romeo and Juliet on screen =

Adaptations of Shakespeare's play

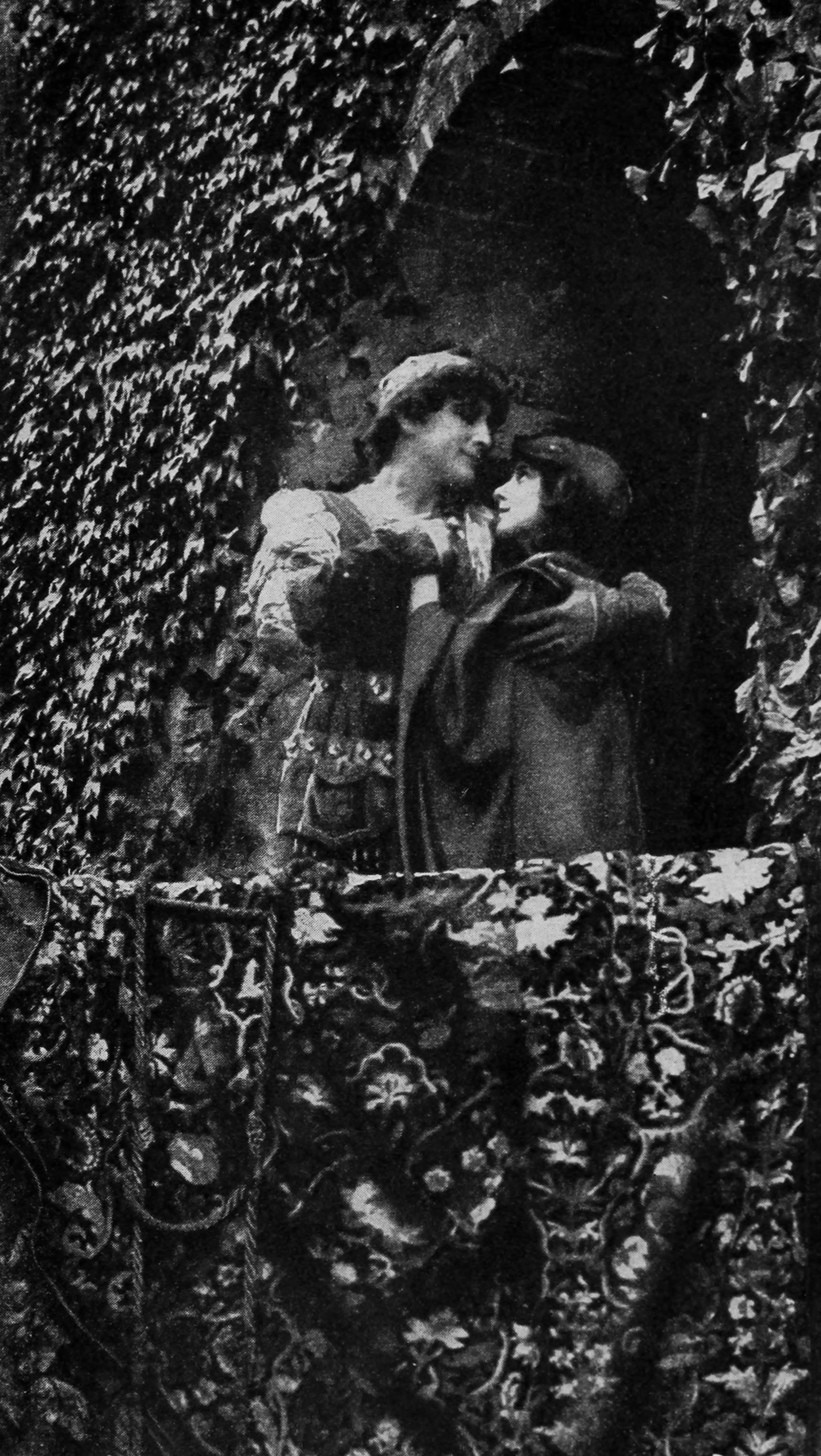
Francis X. Bushman and Beverly Bayne in a 1916 film adaptation of Romeo and Juliet

William Shakespeare's Romeo and Juliet may be one of the most-screened plays of all time. The most notable theatrical releases were George Cukor's multi-Oscar-nominated 1936 production Romeo and Juliet, Franco Zeffirelli's 1968 film Romeo and Juliet, and Baz Luhrmann's 1996 MTV-inspired Romeo + Juliet. The latter two were both, at the time, the highest-grossing Shakespeare films. Cukor featured the mature actors Norma Shearer and Leslie Howard as the teenage lovers while Zeffirelli populated his film with beautiful young people, and Baz Luhrmann produced a heavily cut fast-paced version aimed at teenage audiences.

Several reworkings of the story have also been filmed, most notably West Side Story, Prokofiev's ballet Romeo and Juliet and Romanoff and Juliet. Several theatrical films, such as Shakespeare in Love and Romeo Must Die, consciously use elements of Shakespeare's plot.

== Significant feature releases ==
=== George Cukor / MGM (1936) ===
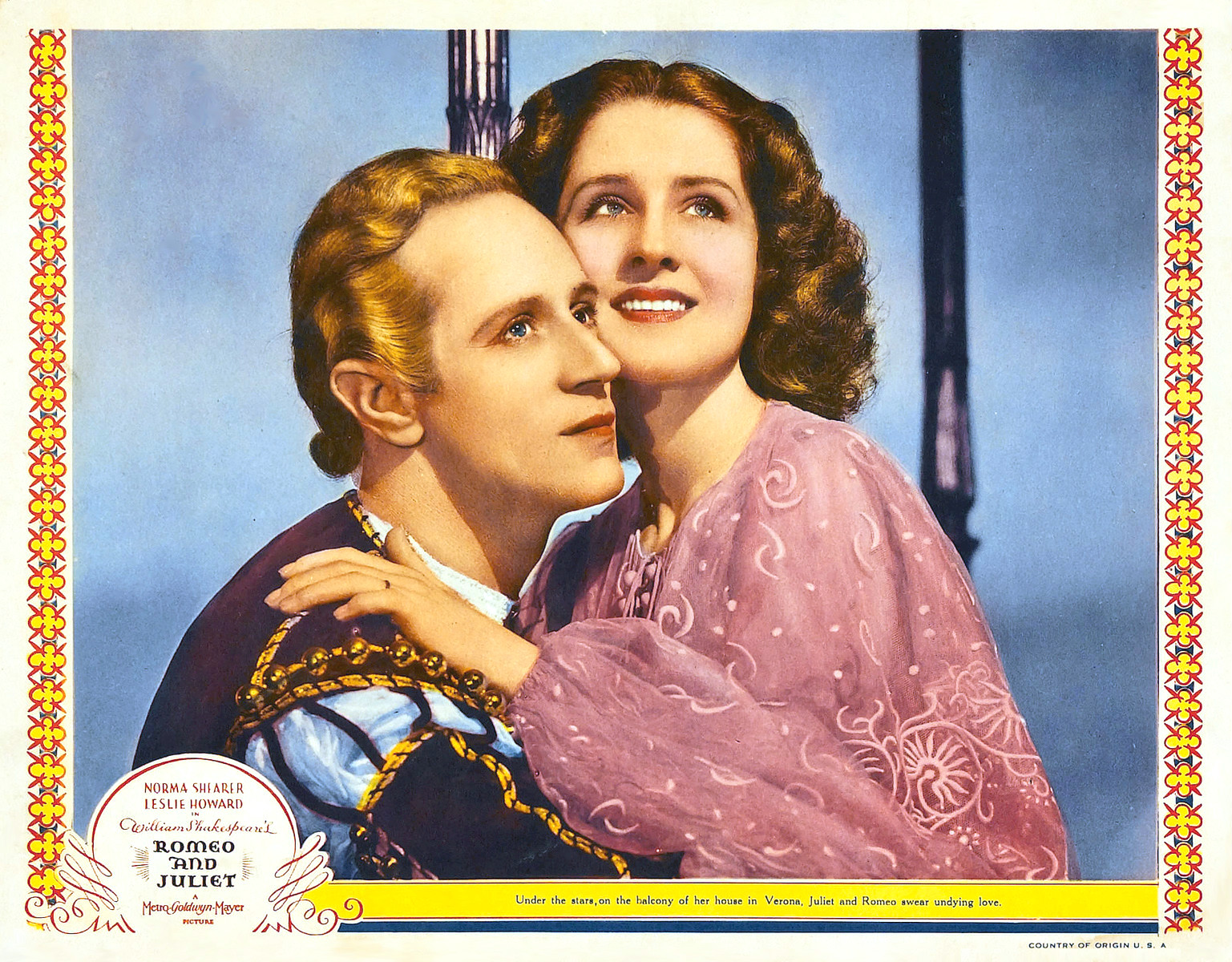
Leslie Howard and Norma Shearer in the balcony scene of George Cukor's 1936 Romeo and Juliet.

Producer Irving Thalberg pushed MGM for five years to make a Romeo and Juliet, in the face of the studio's opposition: which stemmed from Louis B. Mayer's belief that the masses considered the Bard over their heads, and from the austerity forced on the studios by the Depression. It was only when Jack L. Warner announced his intention to film Max Reinhardt's A Midsummer Night's Dream that Mayer, not to be outdone, gave Thalberg the go-ahead. Thalberg's stated intention was "to make the production what Shakespeare would have wanted had he possessed the facilities of cinema." He went to great lengths to establish authenticity and the film's intellectual credentials: researchers were sent to Verona to take photographs for the designers; the paintings of Botticelli, Bellini, Carpaccio and Gozzoli were studied to provide visual inspiration; and two academic advisers (John Tucker Murray of Harvard and William Strunk, Jr. of Cornell) were flown to the set, with instructions to criticise the production freely. The film includes two songs drawn from other plays by Shakespeare: "Come Away Death" from Twelfth Night and "Honour, Riches, Marriage, Blessing" from The Tempest. Thalberg had only one choice for director: George Cukor, who was known as "the women's director". Thalberg's vision was that the performance of Norma Shearer, his wife, would dominate the picture.

Scholar Stephen Orgel describes Cukor's film as "largely miscast ... with a preposterously mature pair of lovers in Leslie Howard and Norma Shearer, and an elderly John Barrymore as a stagey Mercutio decades out of date." Barrymore was in his late fifties, and played Mercutio as a flirtatious tease. Romeo wears gloves in the balcony scene, and Juliet has a pet fawn. Tybalt is usually portrayed as a hot-headed troublemaker, but Basil Rathbone played him as stuffy and pompous.

Thalberg cast screen actors, rather than stage actors, but shippedin East Coast drama coaches (such as the acclaimed Frances Robinson Duff to coach Norma Shearer, who had never acted on stage) with the unfortunate consequence that actors previously adored for their naturalism gave what are now considered stilted performances. The shoot extended to six months, and the budget reached $2 million, making it MGM's most expensive film since the 1925 silent Ben-Hur.

Like most Shakespearean filmmakers, Cukor and his screenwriter Talbot Jennings cut much of the original script: playing around 45% of it. Many of these cuts are common ones in the theatre, such as the second appearance of the chorus and the comic scene of Peter with the musicians. Others are filmic: designed to replace words with action, or rearranging scenes in order to introduce groups of characters in longer narrative sequences. However, Jennings retains more of Shakespeare's poetry for the young lovers than any of his big-screen successors. Several scenes are interpolated, including three sequences featuring Friar John in Mantua. In contrast, the role of Friar Laurence (an important character in the play) is much reduced. A number of scenes are expanded as opportunities for visual spectacle, including the opening brawl (set against the backdrop of a religious procession), the wedding and Juliet's funeral. The party scene, choreographed by Agnes de Mille, includes Rosaline (an unseen character in Shakespeare's script) who rebuffs Romeo. The role of Peter is enlarged, and played by Andy Devine as a faint-hearted bully. He speaks lines which Shakespeare gave to other Capulet servants, making him the instigator of the opening brawl.

Clusters of images are used to define the central characters: Romeo is first sighted leaning against a ruined building in an arcadian scene, complete with a pipe-playing shepherd and his sheepdog; the livelier Juliet is associated with Capulet's formal garden, with its decorative fish pond.

Neither critics nor the public responded enthusiastically, although Robert Osborne has stated that the film was a success when he hosted a telecast of it on Turner Classic Movies. Graham Greene wrote that he was "less than ever convinced that there is an aesthetic justification for filming Shakespeare at all... the effect of even the best scenes is to distract." Cinemagoers considered the film too "arty", staying away as they had from Warner's A Midsummer Night Dream a year before: leading to Hollywood abandoning the Bard for over a decade. The film nevertheless received four Oscar nominations. Subsequent film versions would make use of less experienced, but more photogenic, actors in the central roles. Cukor, interviewed in 1970, said of his film: "It's one picture that if I had to do over again, I'd know how. I'd get the garlic and the Mediterranean into it."

=== Franco Zeffirelli (1968) ===
Olivia Hussey as Juliet in the balcony scene of Franco Zeffirelli's 1968 film Romeo and Juliet.

Stephen Orgel describes Franco Zeffirelli's 1968 Romeo and Juliet as being "full of beautiful young people, and the camera, and the lush Technicolor, make the most of their sexual energy and good looks." Sarah Munson Deats – referring to recent opposition to the Vietnam War – says that the film was "particularly intended to attract the counter-culture youth, a generation of young people, like Romeo and Juliet, estranged from their parents, torn by the conflict between their youthful cult of passion and the military tradition of their elders." Filming at the time of the "British Invasion", Zeffirelli was able to use an English cast to appeal to American audiences. Zeffirelli said of his film:

The teenagers of the play should be a lot like kids today... They don't want to get involved in their parents' hates and wars. Romeo was a sensitive, naive pacifist, and Juliet was strong, and wise for a fourteen-year-old. That is why I chose inexperienced actors. I don't expect a performance from Olivia or Lenny. I want them to use their own experience to illuminate Shakespeare's characters.

In truth, Zeffirelli's young leads were already experienced actors: Leonard Whiting (then 16) had been the youngest member of the National Theatre and had played The Artful Dodger in Oliver! on stage. Olivia Hussey (aged 15) had studied for four years at the Italia Conti Drama School and had starred opposite Vanessa Redgrave in The Prime of Miss Jean Brodie in the West End.

Zeffirelli filmed his Romeo and Juliet shortly after completing work on his 1967 film The Taming of the Shrew and had learned from his experience on that project that it was better not to include speeches made redundant by his vivid images. He played around 35% of Shakespeare's script, enhancing the focus on the two central characters and making them more sympathetic, while simplifying their roles to make them less tricky for his young leads to play. He tellingly juxtaposes the betrothal of Juliet and Paris with the Capulets' crumbling marriage. Yet the film is often noted for its zest for life and for love: the former epitomised by John McEnery's Mercutio, the latter by Leonard Whiting's Romeo. In contrast to Renato Castellani's 1954 version, Zeffirelli highlighted Romeo's positive relationships with the Friar, Balthazar and Mercutio. The way in which Mercutio physically collapses onto Romeo after the Queen Mab speech, and again when mortally wounded, has been credited with introducing homosexual overtones into the public perception of their relationship.

Zeffirelli's handling of the duel scene has been particularly praised, and his device later adopted by Baz Luhrmann. Taking his cue from Benvolio's speech ending "For now these hot days is the mad blood stirring" Zeffirelli depicts the dry, oppressive heat of the little town where (in Anthony West's words) "men seek to kill each other to relieve their exasperation at having nothing better to do". The duel is presented as bravado getting out-of-control: the youths baiting one another, half-teasingly. Critic Robert Hatch described Tybalt and Mercutio as "a couple of neighborhood warlords, vaunting their courage with grandstand high jinks, trying for a victory by humiliation, and giving no strong impression of a taste to kill." The scene increases sympathy for Michael York's Tybalt (often played as a bloodthirsty bully on the stage) by making him shocked and guilty at the lethal wound he has inflicted.

Like most screen directors of the play, Zeffirelli cut the duel with Paris, which helps to keep Romeo sympathetic to the audience.

A particular difficulty for any screenwriter arises towards the end of the fourth act, where Shakespeare's play requires considerable compression to be effective on the big screen, without giving the impression of "cutting to the chase". In Zeffirelli's version, Juliet's return home from the Friar's cell, her submission to her father and the preparation for the wedding are drastically abbreviated, and the tomb scene is also cut short: Paris does not appear at all, and Benvolio (in the Balthazar role) is sent away but is not threatened.

The film courted controversy by including a nude wedding-night scene while Olivia Hussey was only fifteen. Nino Rota's Love Theme from the film, with the original lyrics (which had been drawn from several Shakespeare plays) replaced to become the song "A Time For Us", became a modest international chart hit.

=== Baz Luhrmann (1996) ===
Australian director Baz Luhrmann's 1996 Romeo + Juliet and its accompanying soundtrack successfully targeted the "MTV Generation": a young audience of similar age to the story's characters. Far darker than Zeffirelli's version, the film is set in the "crass, violent and superficial society" of Verona Beach and Sycamore Grove. The visual conventions of the film were (in Stephen Orgel's words) "largely those of porn films". Luhrmann studied Zeffirelli's heavily cut script, and retained Shakespeare's language; however, he brought the setting up to date, making the Montagues and Capulets mobsters in a modern Miami-like city (although actually filmed in Mexico City and Veracruz). Luhrmann said of his film:

Shakespeare's plays touched everyone from the street sweeper to the Queen of England. He was a rambunctious, sexy, violent, entertaining storyteller. We're trying to make this movie rambunctious, sexy, violent and entertaining the way Shakespeare might have if he had been a filmmaker. We have not shied away from clashing low comedy with high tragedy, which is the style of the play, for it is the low comedy that allows you to embrace the very high emotions of the tragedy.

Luhrmann was impressed with the verse-speaking of his Romeo, Leonardo DiCaprio, saying "the words just came out of his mouth as if it was the most natural language possible". Others were less kind: Daniel Rosenthal comments that "DiCaprio's throwaway, sometimes inaudible delivery is, for those not inclined to swoon uncritically at his beauty, the movie's weakest link." Juliet, the sixteen-year-old Claire Danes, was praised for portraying a poise and wisdom beyond her years, and as the first screen Juliet whose speech sounded spontaneous. Miriam Margolyes played the nurse for laughs as a plump Hispanic, forever crying "Hooliet! Hooliet!" Pete Postlethwaite, with his Celtic Cross tattoo, captures the "charming ambiguity" of the Friar. Paul Sorvino and Diane Venora play the Capulets as a boozy gangland patriarch and a miserable southern belle, unhappily married and frequently abusive to each other.

A framing device portrays the events of the play as newscasts and newspaper headlines. The film's action sequences were reminiscent of the films of Sam Peckinpah and John Woo, and its characters wear designer clothes and (in Douglas Brode's words) "a lingerie collection worthy of Madonna". As Peter Travers commented in Rolling Stone, the intention was to "make Romeo and Juliet accessible to the elusive Gen-X audience without leaving the play bowdlerised and broken". Some aspects of the modernisation have been praised as effective (a newscaster speaking the prologue, for example, or the replacement of Friar John with a courier message which gets misdelivered); others have been criticised as ridiculous: including a police chief banishing Romeo for a street killing rather than ordering his arrest. Luhrmann highlighted the religious aspects of the play, surrounding his two central characters with religious icons, and staging his finale in a cathedral. That final scene was regarded by some critics as Luhrmann's masterstroke: adapting a device first used in restoration adaptations of the play, Juliet begins to wake before Romeo takes the poison, but he does not notice her movements until he has done so, then he dies aware that she has survived. The scene uses cuts and extreme close-ups to generate a tension impossible to achieve in the theatre. The mood is undermined a moment later as Juliet blows her brains out with a pistol. The role of the watch is cut completely, permitting Friar Laurence to be with Juliet and to be taken by surprise by her sudden suicide.

The film's prominent use of tracks from popular bands including Radiohead and The Cardigans (and especially prominently Mercutio's wild transvestite dancing to the disco anthem Young Hearts Run Free) led to two hit soundtrack albums.

Mixed reviews greeted the endeavor, including Luhrmann's decision to delete the reconciliation of the feuding families, thus undermining the play's original ending and its lesson concerning the price of peace. Todd McCarthy, in Variety, summed up: "as irritating and glib as some of it may be, there is indisputably a strong vision here that has been worked out in considerable detail." As Zeffirelli's version had done before it, Baz Luhrmann's film broke the record for the highest-grossing Shakespeare film of all time, taking $144m worldwide.

== Other performances ==
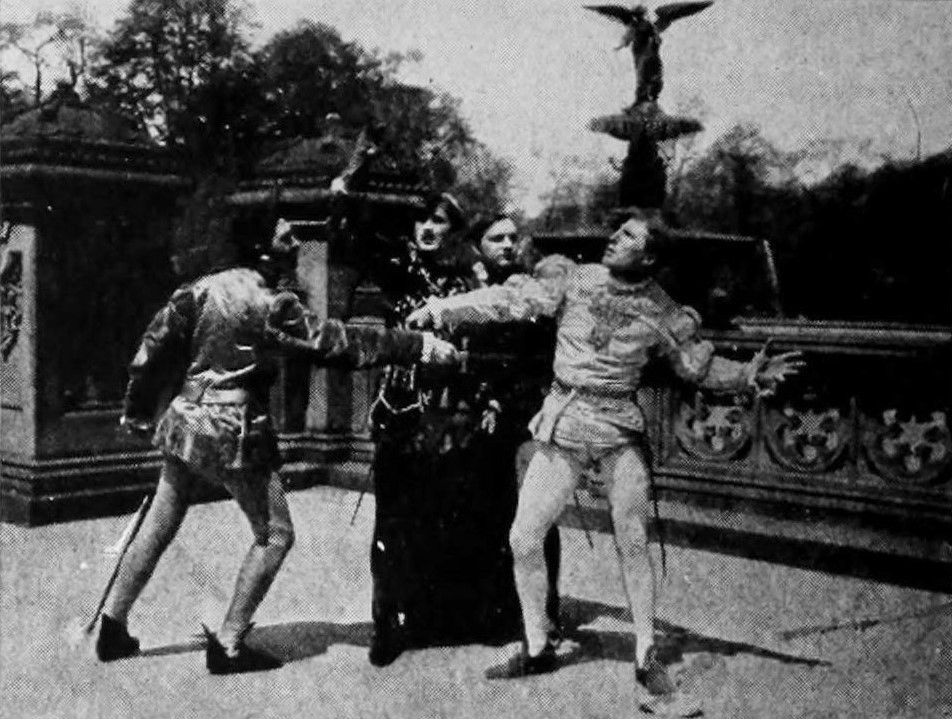
Tybalt and Mercutio's duel from the 1908 adaptation

Film scholar Douglas Brode claims that Romeo and Juliet is the most-filmed play of all time. In the silent era it was filmed by Georges Méliès, which inspired a burlesque by Thomas Edison, both of which are now lost. Vitagraph produced a ten-minute version in 1908 which has survived, featuring Florence Lawrence. Gerolamo Lo Savio shot an ambitious version on location in Verona for Film d'Arte Italiana. Edwin and Gertrude Thanhouser produced a spectacular version in the USA. In 1916, Metro and Fox produced versions of the play as star-vehicles, the former featuring Francis X. Bushman as Romeo, and the latter featuring Theda Bara (usually famous for "vamp" roles) as the innocent Juliet. The play was first heard on film in The Hollywood Revue of 1929, in which John Gilbert recited the balcony scene opposite Norma Shearer as Juliet, who would later play the same role in George Cukor's feature version.

Renato Castellani won the Grand Prix at the Venice Film Festival for his 1954 film of Romeo and Juliet. His film contains interpolated scenes intended to establish the class system and Catholicism of Renaissance Verona, and the nature of the feud. Some of Castellani's changes have been criticised as ineffective: interpolated dialogue is often banal, and the Prince's appearances are reimagined as formal hearings, undermining the spontaneity of Benvolio's defence of Romeo's behaviour in the duel scene. The major supporting roles are vastly reduced, including that of the nurse; Mercutio becomes (in the words of Daniel Rosenthal) "the tiniest of cameos" and Friar Laurence "an irritating ditherer", although Pauline Kael, who loved the film, called this Friar Laurence "a radiantly silly little man". Castellani's most prominent changes related to Romeo's character, cutting back or removing scenes involving his parents, Benvolio and Mercutio in order to highlight Romeo's isolation, and inserting a parting scene in which Montague coldly pulls his banished son out of Lady Montague's farewell embrace. Another criticism made by film scholar Patricia Tatspaugh is that the realism of the settings, so carefully established throughout the film, "goes seriously off the rails when it come to the Capulets' vault". Castellani uses competing visual images in relation to the central characters: ominous grilles (and their shadows) contrasted with frequent optimistic shots of blue sky. A well-known stage Romeo, John Gielgud, played Castellani's chorus (and would reprise the role in the 1978 BBC Shakespeare version). Laurence Harvey, as Romeo, was already an experienced screen actor, who would shortly take over roles intended for the late James Dean in Walk on the Wild Side and Summer and Smoke. By contrast, Susan Shentall, as Juliet, was a secretarial student who was discovered by the director in a London pub, and was cast for her "pale sweet skin and honey-blonde hair". She failed to rise to the demands of the role, and would marry shortly after the shoot, never returning to screen acting. Other parts were played by inexperienced actors, also: Mercutio was played by an architect, Montague by a gondolier from Venice, and the Prince by a novelist. Critics responded to the film as a piece of cinema (its visuals were especially admired in Italy, where it was filmed) but not as a performance of Shakespeare's play; Robert Hatch in The Nation said "We had come to see a play... perhaps we should not complain that we were shown a sumptuous travelogue", and Time's reviewer added that "Castellani's Romeo and Juliet is a fine film poem... Unfortunately it is not Shakespeare's poem!"

In 1992, Leon Garfield abridged the play to 25 minutes for the S4C/Soyuzmultfilm Shakespeare: The Animated Tales series. Such drastic abridgement inevitably led to emphasising plot over character, and the Romeo and Juliet episode has been described as "almost absurdly frenetic". This episode was directed by Efim Gamburg, using cel animation.

The PBS series Wishbone aired its fourth episode "Rosie, Oh! Rosie, Oh!" in 1995 featuring the titular Jack Russell terrier as Romeo Montague in a television stage production of Romeo and Juliet. The 2026 Central Park production by The Public Theater was filmed and is set for release as part of the PBS Great Performances series.

== Adaptations ==
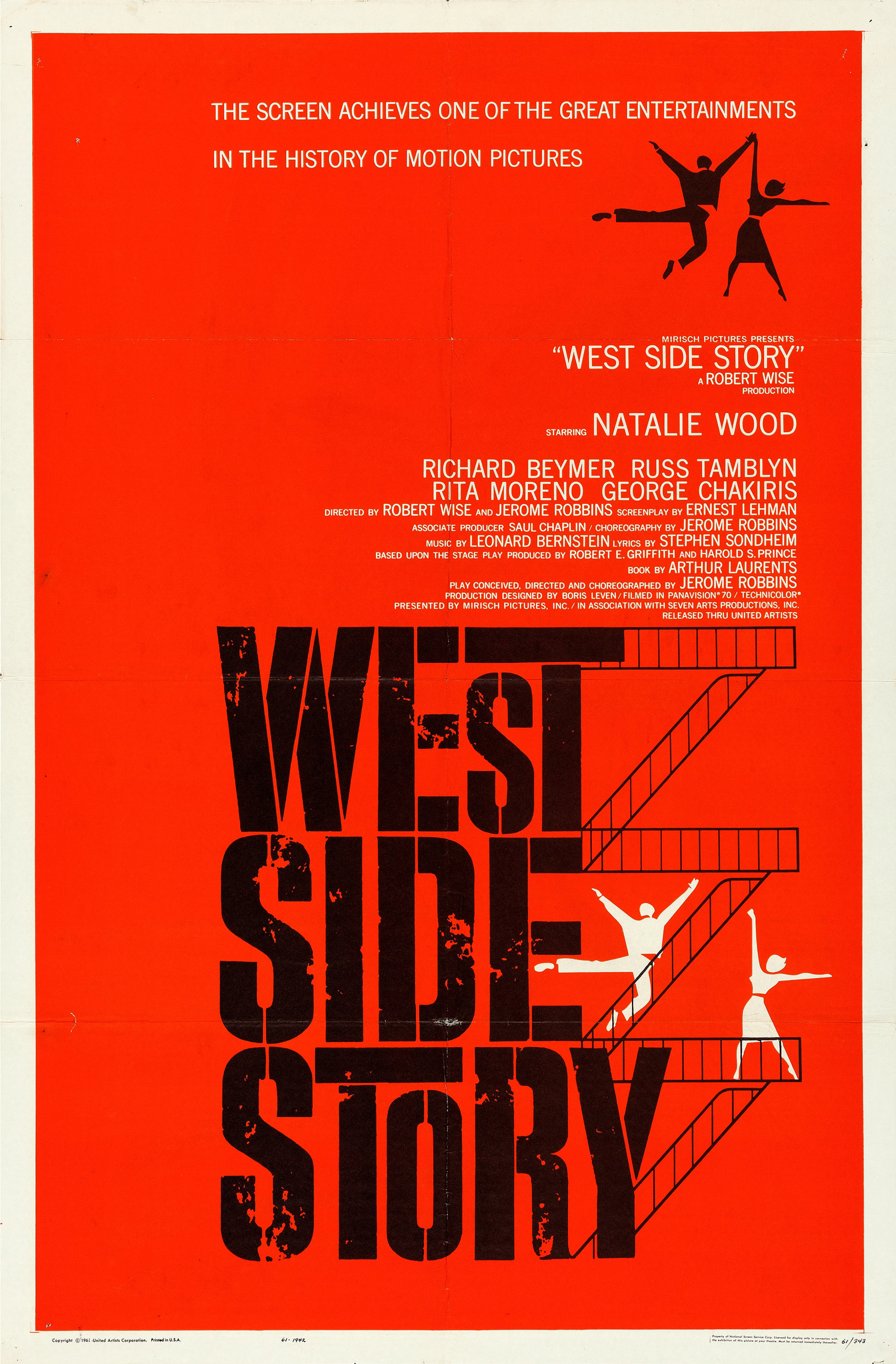
West Side Story (1961)

The name of Romeo and Juliet has become synonymous with young love. Tony Howard concludes that "we inherit so many of our images of romance, generational discord and social hatred from the play that it is impossible to list all its cinematic reincarnations", citing works as disparate as the Polish 1937 Romeo i Julieta, the Swiss 1941 A Village Romeo and Juliet, the French 1949 Les amants de Vérone and the Czech 1960 Romeo, Juliet a Tma. As a result of this ubiquity, any film about young love and its challenges will court comparison with Romeo and Juliet, as Roseanna McCoy did in 1949, and two James Dean films – East of Eden and Rebel Without a Cause – did in the 1950s.

In 1960, Peter Ustinov's stage parody of Romeo and Juliet, Romanoff and Juliet was filmed – dramatising true love interfering with the cold-war superpowers' attempts to control the fictional state of Concordia.

In 1980 an episode of the anime Astro Boy was based on the Romeo and Juliet story. There were two rival car and robot companies, which racer Robio falls in love with Robiette of the rival company. At the end the two young lovers get smooshed together by both their fathers driving into each other, and after that they two rivals give up the fight, and Astro remarks that now Robio and Robiette will be together forever.

The success of the 1957 stage musical West Side Story was instrumental in making Shakespeare a presence in modern popular and youth culture. The book was written by Arthur Laurents, with music by Leonard Bernstein, lyrics by Stephen Sondheim, and choreography by Jerome Robbins. Widely admired, and the winner of ten Oscars, the 1961 film of the show – set among New York gangs – does not aim for a realistic portrayal of New York gang culture: in the opening sequence the Jets and the Sharks trade dance-steps instead of blows. The Jets are a gang of white youths, equivalent to Shakespeare's Montagues; the Sharks, equivalent to the Capulets, are Puerto Rican. Unlike Shakespeare who included relationships between his young lovers and the older generation (the parents, and parent-substitutes such as the Nurse and Friar Laurence) West Side Story keeps its focus firmly on the youth, with only peripheral roles for Doc, the soda-shop owner, and police officers Schrank and Krupke. Tony (played by Richard Beymer, singing dubbed by Jimmy Bryant) is the play's Romeo and Maria (Natalie Wood, dubbed by Marni Nixon) is its Juliet. Maria's fiery brother Bernardo (George Chakiris) combines the Lord Capulet and Tybalt roles. The film's ending has been praised for achieving the tragedy of Shakespeare's play without recourse to magic potions or fateful bad timing.

In 1987 Abel Ferrara directed a take on the classic tale of Romeo and Juliet in China Girl, an independent neo-noir romantic thriller film. Set in 1980s Manhattan, the plot revolves around the intimate relationship developing between Tony, a teenage boy from Little Italy, and Tye, a teenage girl from Chinatown, while both of their older brothers become engrossed in a heated gang war against each other. It also bears some similarities to the 1957 musical West Side Story, which similarly is an adaptation of Romeo and Juliet set among rival ethnic gangs in Manhattan, and also features a male protagonist named Tony.

In 1996, Troma Studios and director Lloyd Kaufman filmed Tromeo and Juliet, a transgressive "trash/punk" adaptation of the play, set in present-day Manhattan and featuring Lemmy (of Motörhead) as its chorus. Sporting the tagline "Body piercing. Kinky sex. Dismemberment. The things that made Shakespeare great.", Tromeo and Juliet premiered at the 1997 Cannes Film Festival and won several awards at independent horror and fantasy film festivals. Despite positive reviews from The New York Times, USA Today, Entertainment Weekly and Variety, Shakespeare scholar Daniel Rosenthal described Tromeo as "the nadir of screen Shakespeare", calling it a "tedious, appallingly acted feast of mutilation and softcore sex".

Cheah Chee-Kong's 2000 Singaporean film Chicken Rice War (Jiyuan Qiaohe) adapts Romeo and Juliet as a lowbrow romantic comedy set amidst the rivalry between two adjacent rice stalls. The central characters (Fenson Pierre Png and Audrey Lum May Yee) are cast as Romeo and Juliet in a production of Shakespeare's play, staged in a car park, which their families manage to ruin through their rivalry. The comic mood is underpinned by cheerful songs from Tanya Chua. The film won the Discovery Award at the 2001 Toronto International Film Festival.

Marc Levin's 2001 Brooklyn Babylon set in Crown Heights features Tariq Trotter of The Roots as the two primary factions of the community, West Indian Rastafarians and the Lubavitch Jewish community, come into conflict.

In 2005, Romeo and Juliet became a high-profile six-minute H&M advertising campaign, directed by David LaChapelle, featuring Tamyra Gray as Juliet and Gus Carr as Romeo, to a musical background sung by Mary J. Blige. The play has also been used to advertise Polo mints and Rolo. In 2006, Nate Parker debuted as a male lead in Rome and Jewel, a hip-hop take on Romeo and Juliet.

In the 2005 anime Basilisk the story about two rival ninja clans fighting each other but one of their members love each other is similar to that of Romeo and Juliet.

The 2007 anime Romeo x Juliet is a fantasy retelling of the famed play. In it, Juliet's family were rulers of a floating island nation called Neo Verona before being killed by the Montagues, forcing her to hide in a theater troupe owned by a fictional version of William Shakespeare.

The play has also inspired two major Bollywood romantic dramas: Mansoor Khan's Qayamat Se Qayamat Tak (1988) starring Aamir Khan and Juhi Chawla and Sanjay Leela Bhansali's Ram-Leela (2013) starring Ranveer Singh and Deepika Padukone.

Tanna (2015), the depiction of a Romeo and Juliet-like story based on an actual marriage dispute, is set on the island of Tanna in Vanuatu.

The 2017 TV series Still Star-Crossed includes brief scenes based on the original play but focuses primarily on the families after the deaths of the two main characters. The Spanish TV series La que se avecina parodied a surrealist story of Romeo and Juliet in the episode eight of the season eight. Antonio Pagudo portrayed Romeo and Cristina Castaño portrayed Juilet.

The play was also adapted into an experimental independent film, R#J, which presented the story through text messages, photos and videos on mobile phones and social media posts. The film premiered at the 2021 Sundance Film Festival on January 30, 2021.

In 2023, the play was adapted by the Brazilian TV channel SBT as A Infância de Romeu e Julieta (The Childhood of Romeo and Juliet), in the format of a telenovela focused on children presenting a modernized version with Romeo being played by an Afro-Brazilian actor.

An upcoming anime television series based on the manga of the same name, titled Kishuku Gakkō no Juliet (Boarding School Juliet), features the titular characters in a modern day, Japanese high school setting.

== Films featuring performances, or composition ==
Another way in which film-makers and authors use Shakespearean texts is to feature characters who are actors performing those texts, within a wider non-Shakespearean story. Hamlet and Romeo and Juliet are the two plays which have most often been used in this way. Usually, Shakespeare's story has some parallel or resonance with the main plot. Films featuring characters performing scenes from Romeo and Juliet include the 1912 and 1982 film versions of Charles Dickens' Nicholas Nickleby, Cured Hams (1927), Drama De Luxe (1927), Broadway Fever (1928), Les amants de Vérone (1949), Marjorie Morningstar (1958), Carry on Teacher (1959) Shakespeare Wallah (1965) and, significantly, Shakespeare in Love (1998).

The 1941 film Playmates features bandleader Kay Kyser and Shakespearean actor John Barrymore playing themselves in a plot which involves Kyser producing an adaptation featuring "swing musician Romeo Smith and opera singer Juliet Jones, with Juliet's father, a devotee of classical music, as obstacle to their romance."

André Cayatte's Les Amants de Vérone (France, 1949) features Georgia (Anouk Aimée), the daughter of the declining Maglia family (roughly the equivalent of Shakespeare's Capulets) who meets her Romeo in working-class Angelo (Serge Reggiani) while working as stand-ins for the actors playing Romeo and Juliet in a film of the play. The film is a melodramatic reworking of the Romeo and Juliet story, centering on the beauty and passion of the protagonists, and ending with their tragic deaths.

The conceit of dramatising Shakespeare writing Romeo and Juliet has been used several times. The oddball 1944 B-movie Time Flies features the comedy duo Susie and Bill Barton, who, time travelling, encounter a Shakespeare struggling for words for his balcony scene, which Susie (Evelyn Dall) supplies from memory, while Bill interrupts with quips. John Madden's 1998 Shakespeare in Love depicts Shakespeare's process in composing Romeo and Juliet against the backdrop of his own doomed love affair. Writers Marc Norman and Tom Stoppard exploited another commonplace of Shakespeare-related films, which scholar Tony Howard describes as the "playing Shakespeare is a gateway to self-fulfilment" plot. As he explains it, "an ill-matched crew of Elizabethan theatre people are transformed and united by the process of creating Romeo and Juliet". The film's climax includes Judi Dench's Elizabeth I declaring that Shakespeare's play "can show us the very truth and nature of love."

=== Screen performances ===
For comprehensive list, see Romeo and Juliet (films).

=== Media inspired by the play ===
- Beneath the 12 Mile Reef (USA, 1953) transposes the general plot of the play to rival fishing families in Depression-era Florida.
- Romanoff and Juliet (USA, 1960) is a film of Peter Ustinov's theatrical Cold War adaptation.
- West Side Story (USA, 1961) is the film of a Broadway musical adaptation of the Romeo and Juliet story, set in 1950s New York, by Stephen Sondheim and Leonard Bernstein
  - Robert Wise and Jerome Robbins directors
  - Natalie Wood as Maria (based on Juliet)
  - Richard Beymer as Tony (based on Romeo)
- Aaron Loves Angela (USA, 1975) is an interracial romance set in New York City
  - Gordon Parks Jr., director
  - Kevin Hooks as Aarron (based on Romeo)
  - Irene Cara as Angela (based on Juliet)
- Romie-0 and Julie-8 (Canada, 1979) is a made-for-television animated film in which the two leads are depicted as robots made by rival companies who fall in love.
  - Clive A. Smith, director
  - Greg Swanson as the voice of Romie-0
  - Donann Cavin as the voice of Julie-8
- Qayamat Se Qayamat Tak (India, 1988) is a Bollywood romantic drama directed by Mansoor Khan.
  - Aamir Khan as Raj (based on Romeo)
  - Juhi Chawla as Rashmi (based on Juliet)
- Chicken Rice War (Singapore) a film based on Romeo and Juliet
- Love Is All There Is (USA, 1996) is a comic take on the tragic story, set in The Bronx, involving two Italian immigrant families who own opposing restaurants.
  - Nathaniel Marston as Rosario (the Romeo character)
  - Angelina Jolie as Gina (the Juliet character)
- The Lion King II: Simba's Pride (1998) is an American animated film that serves as a direct-to-video sequel to the 1994 film The Lion King. It involves an animosity between two prides (Pridelanders led by Simba and Outsiders led by Zira). Though unlike Romeo and Juliet, the film's two main characters do not die.
  - Neve Campbell as Kiara (Simba's daughter and the Juliet character).
  - Jason Marsden as Kovu (Zira's son and the Romeo character).
- Romeo Must Die (2000) is a martial arts film variation on the Romeo and Juliet theme.
  - Andrzej Bartkowiak director
  - Jet Li as Han
  - Aaliyah as Trish O’Day
- Amar te duele (2002) is a Mexican film variation on the Romeo and Juliet theme about a couple that are from different social classes.
  - Martha Higareda as Renata (the Juliet character)
  - Luis Fernando Peña as Ulises (the Romeo character)
- حبك نار (Hobak Nar or Your love is fire) (Egypt, 2004) is an Egyptian film, setting the tragedy in modern Cairo.
- Pizza My Heart (USA, TV, 2005) is a comic adaptation set in Verona, New Jersey.
- Romeo & Juliet: Sealed with a Kiss (USA, 2006) is an animated adaptation of the story told with seals and features a kid-friendly happy ending.
- Romeo x Juliet (Japan, TV, 2007) is an anime series derived from the play.
  - Brina Palencia as Juliet
  - Chris Burnett as Romeo
- Episode 33 of the anime series Kodocha is loosely based upon the play, in which the boys and girls of Class 6-3 are in a big feud, during which supporting characters Tsuyoshi Sasaki and Aya Sugita play roles similar to Romeo and Juliet.
- Gnomeo and Juliet (2011) closely follows the plot of the original play, but using gnomes, renaming Romeo "Gnomeo", setting it in backyards in an England suburb. It has a lot of Shakespearean comedy, as well as humor relative to the modern day. Shakespeare himself appears in the movie, but as a statue. It has a happy ending, though it seems at first the protagonists were smashed by the giant groundskeeping machine, the Terrafirminator.
- Season 2, Episode 14 (1997) of 3rd Rock from the Sun features Dick directing the school play. Tommy's girlfriend plays Juliet, Dick does not choose Tommy to play Romeo. Dick, in classic form, overdoes his role as director and makes kids cry.
- Private Romeo, a film by Alan Brown, 2011.
- Goliyon Ki Raasleela Ram-Leela (India, 2013) is a Bollywood romantic drama directed by Sanjay Leela Bhansali.
  - Ranveer Singh as Ram (based on Romeo)
  - Deepika Padukone as Leela (based on Juliet)
- Titanic (USA, 1997) is a film directed by James Cameron, who described the film as "Romeo & Juliet on a ship" when pitching it to studio executives.
- Bad Buddy is a Thai Boys Love television series involving frenemies, sons of two feuding families, turned lovers.

=== Significant parallels ===
- Theatre of Blood features a Shakespearean actor who takes poetic revenge on the critics who denied him recognition, including a fencing scene inspired by Romeo and Juliet.
- Shakespeare in Love dramatises the writing and first performance of Romeo and Juliet.
- The Lion King II: Simba's Pride features Simba's daughter, Kiara, in a forbidden romance with Scar's adopted son, Kovu.
- Butterfly Lovers, a Chinese legend, was made into a cartoon film in 2004, that follows the storyline of Romeo and Juliet.
- The zombie-romantic comedy film Warm Bodies (2013) and Isaac Marion's 2010 novel on which it is based draw numerous parallels to Romeo and Juliet, from the characters' names, relationships, and professions [R(omeo), Julie(ette), M(arcus/Mercutio), Perry (Paris), and Nora (the nurse)], to the balcony scene, to the to-the-death feud that is ultimately healed by the threat to the star-crossed lovers' lives.
