= Shakespeare and East Asia =

2021 book by Alexa Alice Joubin

- Cover
- Author: Alexa Alice Joubin
- Language: English
- Series: Oxford Shakespeare Topics
- Subject: Literary criticism, Shakespeare studies and criticism, film, plays, East Asia
- Genre: Non-fiction
- Publisher: Oxford University Press
- Publication date: 26 January 2021
- Publication place: United States
- Pages: 272
- ISBN: 9780198703570

Shakespeare and East Asia is a book by American author and academic Alex Alice Joubin. (Note: Joubin is Professor of English, Women's, Gender and Sexuality Studies, Theatre, East Asian Languages and Literatures, and International Affairs at George Washington University (GWU). She is the founding Co-director of the Digital Humanities Institute and the Co-director of the Taiwan Education and Research Program at GWU. Joubin holds the John M. Kirk, Jr. Chair in Medieval and Renaissance Literature at Middlebury College Bread Loaf School of English, and serves as the founding co-director of Global Shakespeares, an open-access performance video archive at MIT.) It was published in 2021 by Oxford University Press and is part of its Oxford Shakespeare Topics series. The book explores the distinctive features of post-1950s East Asian cinemas and theatres, delineating four key themes: Japanese formalistic innovations, reparative adaptations from China, Taiwan, and Hong Kong, the politics of gender and film reception in South Korea and the UK, and multilingual diaspora works in Singapore and the UK. By merging film and theatre studies, Joubin's comparative analysis unveils profound structural and narratological connections between Asian and Anglophone performances, emphasizing the metacinematic and metatheatrical dimensions of these adaptations that contribute to reshaping debates about the relationship between East Asia and Europe.

== Background ==
In a 2021 interview with the American Journal of Chinese Studies, Joubin reflected on the process of writing Shakespeare and East Asia, explaining her deliberate choice of the title to emphasize the dynamic interplay between Shakespeare and East Asian cultures rather than a one-sided influence. She highlighted her intention to move beyond traditional, linear narratives that often frame non-Western adaptations as derivative of the Western canon. The author discussed her goal of developing a site-specific critical vocabulary to better analyze these cross-cultural adaptations and to challenge the compulsory realpolitik that often limits the interpretation of non-Western works to their political contexts. She also addressed the complexities of working within and across multiple disciplines, noting how her own diverse background and multidisciplinary approach influenced the writing of the book. Joubin expressed a desire to use this work to build bridges between cultures and to promote a more nuanced understanding of globalization’s impact on cultural production.

== Summary ==
The book explores the diverse landscape of Asian Shakespeare, spanning Japan, China, Taiwan, Hong Kong, South Korea, and Singapore. In contrast to other works focusing on a single nation or genre, this monograph resists national allegory approaches, opting for rhizomatic readings that emphasize connections and cross-fertilization between Asian and Western Shakespearean works. Joubin challenges the pitfalls of "national profiling" and "compulsory realpolitik," urging a focus on the aesthetic and social functions of performances in a postnational space of exchange. The book delves into four themes – form, ideology, reception, and diaspora – with each chapter anchored in a specific cultural sphere. Case studies range from Japanese directors Yukio Ninagawa and Akira Kurosawa to Sinophone adaptations exploring gender roles and remedial Shakespeare. The exploration extends to South Korean productions, examining polyphonic reception and differing views in Shakespearean performances. The final chapter tackles multilingualism and diaspora in Singapore, offering rigorous analyses of various works.

The book consists of a prologue, four core chapters, and an epilogue. (Note: In addition to: a chronology of historical events and key adaptations, a glossary explaining key terminologies, and further readings section.)

=== Prologue ===
The prologue argues against a simplistic view of Shakespeare's impact on colonial contexts, highlighting the interplay and cross-cultural references in global Shakespeare performances. It emphasizes the significance of Asian interpretations of Shakespeare for Western readers and their influence on American and European performance cultures. The author's approach rejects a nationalistic lens, focusing on connections and conflicting interpretations across different cultural contexts. Using the metaphor of a rhizome, the prologue suggests a nonlinear network of knowledge to capture the multiplicity of cultural interpretations effectively.

=== Chapter one ===
The first chapter explores how Akira Kurosawa and Yukio Ninagawa have reimagined Shakespearean works in Japanese film and stage productions. Kurosawa's postwar adaptation of Macbeth and Ninagawa's contemporary stage version highlight the fusion of Japanese theatrical elements with Shakespearean themes. Both directors employ visual and aural techniques to defamiliarize traditional interpretations of Macbeth in Japanese culture. Their works challenge assumptions about Japanese and Shakespearean performance traditions while appealing to both Western and Asian audiences. Kurosawa's cinematic long shots and Ninagawa's use of stage space convey emotional detachment and cinematic quality. Through their innovative approaches, Kurosawa and Ninagawa compel viewers to reconsider conventional notions of cultural representation in performance art.

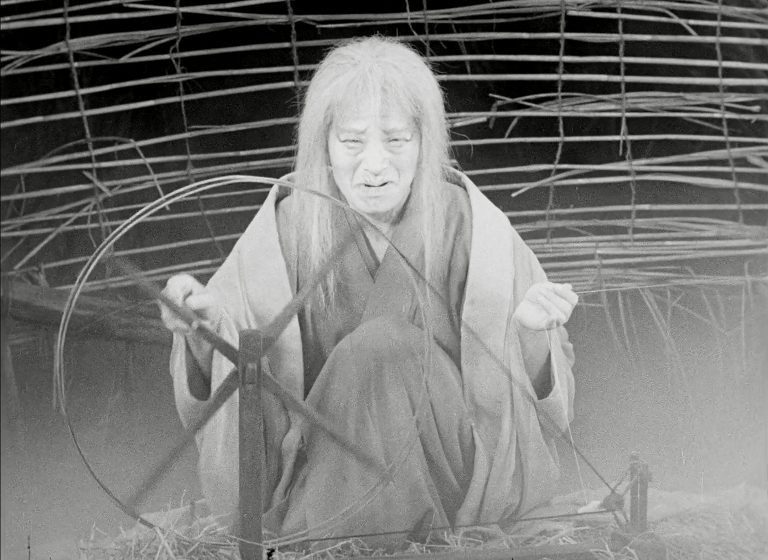
The witch in Throne of Blood (dir. Akira Kurosawa, 1957), as discussed in the first chapter.

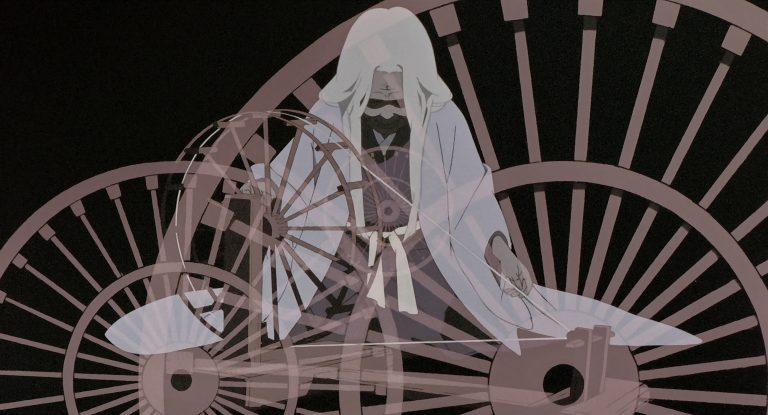
The witch in Millennium Actress (dir. Satoshi Kon, 2001), as discussed in the first chapter.

=== Chapter two ===
The second chapter examines adaptations of Shakespeare in the Sinophone world, focusing on the interplay between form and ideology. It discusses how these adaptations either amplify Shakespeare's perceived remedial merit for promoting social justice or ironize it through parody. Case studies from Hong Kong, Taiwan, and China illustrate different approaches to Shakespearean adaptation. Feng Xiaogang's film "The Banquet" recasts gender roles in a kung fu adaptation of Hamlet, while Taiwan's irreverent parodies, like "Shamlet," showcase a different take on familiarity with Western canon. The chapter also situates select works in international contexts, such as Tom Stoppard's "Rosencrantz and Guildenstern Are Dead." The chapter studies the central role of theater in Hong Kong comedy film "One Husband Too Many," contrasting local stage performances with perceived universal values of cinema.

=== Chapter three ===
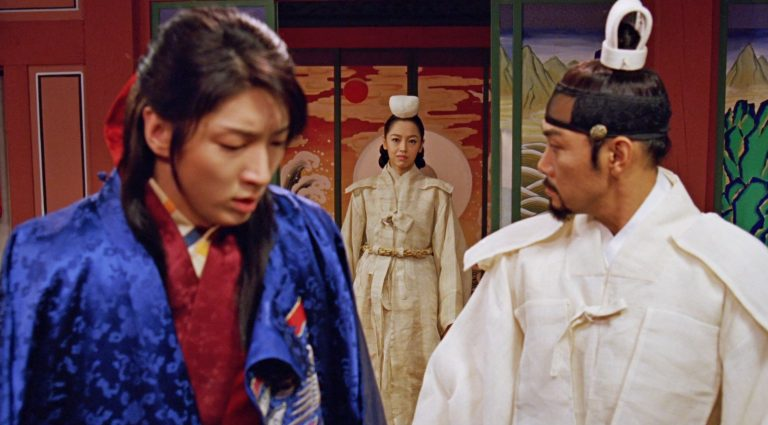
The King and the Clown (dir. Lee Joon-ik, 2005), as discussed in the third chapter. In an intimate scene, concubine Jang Nok-su presses the king on Gong-gil's gender identity.

Chapter three explores how adaptations of Shakespeare's works are produced and received within a complex framework involving multiple voices. It highlights the influence of Asian theatre styles on the global emergence of Shakespearean theatre. The chapter focuses on British receptions of Asian adaptations, specifically examining productions of Romeo and Juliet and The Tempest. It argues that performing Shakespeare in Asian styles and using Shakespearean narratives in Asian contexts are mutually reinforcing processes. It analyzes the South Korean film The King and the Clown, which intertwines Shakespearean themes with fifteenth-century Korean history and traditional theatrical elements. The film's narrative, centered around a transgender character, adds layers of irony to both filmmaking and traditional Korean theatre practices.

=== Chapter four ===
Chapter 4 explores how works like the Singaporean film Chicken Rice War and Ong Keng Sen's stage work Lear address intercultural identity in the Asian diaspora through themes of language, politics, and cultural appropriation. Chicken Rice War critiques Singapore's multiracial policies while depicting the tensions between local language policy and global teen culture. Ong Keng Sen's Lear combines elements of King Lear and Noh theatre to create a multilingual stage production with political undertones, reflecting his diasporic background. The film and stage work both navigate the complexities of intercultural exchange and challenge traditional narratives of identity and power. Through parody, critique, and revisionist history, they highlight the fluidity and contested nature of cultural identities in the diaspora.

=== Epilogue ===
The monograph concludes with an epilogue that discusses how Asian-style presentations of Shakespeare's plays serve to critique contemporary politics and enrich Asian performance styles. Directors emphasize their cultural contexts over east–west binaries, fostering a more equitable globalization rooted in mutual cultural respect. These adaptations redefine globalization beyond Americanization, addressing concerns like Sinicization and Japanization, adding unique local perspectives to Shakespearean performances. Anxieties about cultural influences shape the interpretations and meanings of these productions.

== Reviews ==
Yeeyon Im (Note: From Yonsei University) thought the work offers new perspectives on engaging with foreign Shakespeare, a perspective that moves beyond the traditional Anglophone approach. Im also valued the book's emphasis on East Asian cinema, a previously neglected aspect in global Shakespeare studies. Despite what she deemed as a lack of a systematic development of arguments, Im acknowledged the book's unique approach and its importance in diversifying scholarship on Asian Shakespeare.

Adib Faiz (Note: From the University of Malaya) highlighted the work's innovative interdisciplinary analyses, engaging narrative, and comprehensive vision. Faiz valued what he perceived as a complexity of Joubin's work as both a strength and potential challenge, and noted her use of a "rhizomatic" approach and reception theory to explore intercultural connections. Still, Faiz pointed out what he perceived as a lack of coherence in the book's argument, with key ideas insufficiently explored and unanswered research questions. Faiz stressed a theoretical contradiction in Joubin's emphasis on cultural fluidity while primarily using Western academic frameworks, and suggested that the book paradoxically reinforces Western-Eastern dichotomies. Despite these critiques, Faiz expressed appreciation for Joubin's insights and suggested addressing these issues in future editions or exploring them in a potential follow-up book.

Jeff Tompkins (Note: New York City-based writer and critic) stressed the book's dense and informative exploration of how non-English-speaking cultures have reimagined Shakespeare's plays. He highlighted Joubin's critical stance on cross-cultural Shakespeare in international theatre festivals, particularly her critique of Western tendencies to oversimplify Asian adaptations. Tompkins covered Joubin's insightful analysis of formal innovation in Japanese productions, focusing on Akira Kurosawa's Throne of Blood and Yukio Ninagawa's theatrical Macbeth. The review also underscored Joubin's examination of the myth of Shakespeare's remedial merit, emphasizing its colonial undertones when transplanted to Asian cultures. Tompkins wrote:

No review of Shakespeare and East Asia is complete unless it alerts readers that Joubin has supplemented her book with extensive multimedia content on the MIT Global Shakespeares website. The trove of material there, a bonanza for die-hard Shakespeareans, is an opportunity to delve further into many of the works that are central to her critique. I was grateful for the clips from a piece that prompts one of her most compelling readings: Lear Is Here, a one-man show directed by and starring the Taiwanese actor Wu Hsing-kuo that premiered in 2001 and subsequently played in several countries.

Judging the work as thought-provoking and well-constructed, Yu Zhang (Note: From the Hong Kong Polytechnic University) thought the book is a study that maps the richness and complexity of East Asian contributions to global Shakespeare. Zhang said the book offers a renewed and illuminating understanding of the tension between cultural homogenization and heterogenization in global communities, and applauded the author for combining archival research and cultural analysis with sophisticated theoretical insights, covering a wide array of genres and localities.

Adele Lee praises the book for eschewing the prevailing and harmful approach to Global Shakespeare that values performances more for their political rather than their aesthetic qualities. Lee praises Joubin's astute analysis of shared and unique patterns in post-1950s East Asian adaptations and interpretations of Shakespeare.

Jessica Chiba noted that while there have been many books on Shakespeare reception, a distinctive feature of Alexa Alice Joubin's book is that it eschews cultural profiling—the tendency to bracket, for example, Shakespeare in Japan in isolation from other cultural influences. Joubin's approach lights the way for future studies that may build on the critical work she has done in tracing these broad networks across borders, cultures and languages.

Nicole Jacobs appreciates Joubin's rhizomatic approach that localizes the aesthetic choices made within productions. She endorses Shakespeare and East Asia's challenge of the prevailing critical tendency to interpret contemporary Asian films and theatrical performances primarily as geopolitical allegories.

Andrew Hui reviewed the book and praised its accessible tone, up-to-date scholarship, and the "kaleidoscopic" range of materials. Hui highlighted the book as an essential resource for those interested in Shakespeare's global influence, particularly in East Asia. However, he noted that at times the book "veers toward potted Wikipedian summaries," and mentioned the frequent self-citations as a slight drawback. Despite these critiques, Hui recommended the book, suggesting it as a "first-stop reference" for readers exploring the intersection of Shakespeare and East Asian cultures.

Huimin Wang highlighted the book's significance as the first monograph to explore Shakespeare's influence on East Asian theatre and cinema in a comparative context. Wang said the work offers new perspectives on post-1950s cinema and theatre. However, she also pointed out that the book's vast scope sometimes limited the depth of its explanations, stating that "the author does not have enough space to elaborate cognitive evidences in her argument as the reader will expect." Still, Wang praised the book for its "theoretical astuteness" and its innovative approach in exploring the nuanced connections between Shakespearean adaptations and East Asian theatre and cinema.

Brandon Chua stressed Joubin's exploration of Shakespeare's influence on cultural production in East Asia. Chua noted that Joubin's work assembles a diverse array of cinematic and theatrical adaptations from countries like Japan, Korea, and China, showcasing how these adaptations reflect regional responses to globalization. He pointed out that while Joubin's comparative approach risks assuming uniformity across different cultures, her compelling argument is that these adaptations "stage collective anxieties around processes of globalization." Chua said that Joubin's book is a valuable introduction to the world of non-Anglophone Shakespeares.

In his review, Christopher Thurman emphazied how Joubin challenges the typical "Anglocentric model" in Shakespeare studies, showing how non-Western interpretations have profoundly shaped Western performance traditions. He highlighted Joubin's point that "the Anglosphere is decidedly not the center of the Shakespearean world," underscoring the importance of acknowledging the rich aesthetic and cultural contributions from East Asia, which are often overlooked in favor of geopolitical considerations. Thurman wrote:

Joubin challenges the sinister forms of 'Sinicization' in which, ultimately, those of us who remain ignorant of East Asian cultural and political dynamics are arguably complicit precisely because of our ignorance.

Feng Wei (Note: Professor at the School of Foreign Languages and Literature at Shandong University.) reviewed the book in Mandarin judging it as one of the few comprehensive English monographs that significantly broadens the understanding of Shakespeare’s intercultural dissemination in East Asia. He noted that Joubin's work provided ample case studies and served as a guiding framework for future studies in the field. Wei highlighted the structured approach and thematic depth of the book, stating, "This book breaks new ground in the field of intercultural Shakespeare studies" as it systematically tackled various adaptation issues across different East Asian contexts. However, he pointed out that the selected case studies in Shakespeare and East Asia were mostly classic adaptations and included few recent works. He expressed concern that "the viewpoints and discoveries may not fully represent the constantly changing contemporary world."

== Online multimedia supplement to the book ==
- MIT Global Shakespeares – Video and Performance Archive
