= The Kitchen Musical =

Singaporean television series

- Genre: Musical drama
- Directed by: Chee Kong Cheah (CheeK)
- Starring: Stephen Rahman Hughes; Karylle Tatlonghari; Christian Bautista; Arthur Acuña; Rosemary Vandenbroucke
- Voices of: Karylle Tatlonghari
- Narrated by: Karylle Tatlonghari
- Theme music composer: Karylle Tatlonghari
- Opening theme: "OMG", Karylle Tatlonghari
- Ending theme: "OMG", Karylle Tatlonghari
- Composer: Karylle Tatlonghari
- Original language: English
- No. of episodes: 13

Production
- Production location: Singapore
- Running time: 1 hour
- Production company: The Group Entertainment

Original release
- Network: AXN Asia (Southeast Asia); NTV7 (Malaysia); ABS-CBN and Studio 23 (Philippines)
- Release: 7 October – 30 December 2011

The Kitchen Musical is a Singaporean musical restaurant drama television series.

The series premiered on Friday, 7 October 2011, and ended on Friday, 30 December 2011. It aired in 12 countries, three regions and two continents. These include East Asia, Southeast Asia, Indonesia, Malaysia, Singapore, Brunei, Philippines, Thailand, China, Hong Kong, Macau, Republic of China (Taiwan) and Australia (the only country from Oceania).

The show features a pool of actors, both veteran and new faces from around the region. There are 13 episodes, each lasting one hour long. The show centers on good food and wine, with each episode featuring re-arranged and re-recorded popular hits accompanied by dancing. Every episode features a different menu.

In Malaysia, it was broadcast on NTV7 on Friday at 11:00 MST (UTC+07:00).

In the Philippines, it was aired on ABS-CBN and its sister channel Studio 23.

The show began airing on Myx TV in the U.S. but there are no reports if it will be available through the iTunes Store.

The show was renewed for a second season. Although it was said that the show was renewed for a second season, no new episode was aired since.

== Plot ==
The story revolves around a rich young girl who goes to work at her father's famous restaurant, The Avilon, after graduating from the culinary school Le Cordon Bleu in Paris.

== Characters ==
=== Main characters ===
- Karylle as "Maddie Avilon", a fresh graduate of Le Cordon Bleu. She lands a job as the sous chef in her father's restaurant. She struggles to show her individuality and creativity in the hands of the head chef.
- Stephen Rahman-Hughes as "Alex Marcus", an executive chef of The Avilon, known for his perfection.
- Christian Bautista as "Daniel Ray", a supportive childhood friend of Maddie and the other sous chef of the restaurant.
- Arthur Acuña as "Harry Shaw", a general manager of The Avilon. He keeps secrets from Maddie on her father's motives for letting her work in the restaurant.
- Rosemary Vandenbroucke as "Selena Argon" and a sommelier of The Avilon who will do everything to get what she wants. She has a deep desire to get rid of Maddie and win Alex's heart.

=== Recurring characters ===
- Ikey Canoy as "Winston" – Pastry Chef
- Thou Reyes as "Thou" – Line Cook
- Juan Jackson as "Juan" – Line Cook
- Carla Dunareanu as "Carla" – Line Cook
- Erwin Shah Ismail as "Rico" – Dishwasher
- Juwanda Hassim as "Nelson" – Bartender
- Nadiah M. Din as "Britney" – Receptionist
- Oon Shu An as "Paula" – Receptionist
- Gayle Nerva as "Gayle" – Waitress
- Rebecca Spykerman as "Bec" – Waitress
- Debra Teng as "Leslie" – Head Waitress

== Filming ==
Some scenes in this drama were shot in Kuala Lumpur with co-production with NTV7. Some Kuala Lumpur scenes were also shot in Singapore.

== Criticism ==
This series was somewhat criticized when it was first aired in Singapore.

== Ratings ==
The show received high viewership in Malaysia.

== Reception ==
After the successful media launch of the series, Ben Silverman struck a deal with Singapore-based The Group Entertainment in association with Small World IFT to co-produce and bring the scripted musical drama to the United States. Silverman brought the BBC's The Office and Colombian telenovela Ugly Betty to the United States.

== Awards ==
- Best Writing (Drama Series) New York Festivals 2012
- Nominee Best Drama Series and Best Performance by an Actor International Emmy Awards 2012
