= Talbot Jennings =

American dramatist (1894–1985)

- Born: Talbot Lanham Jennings; August 25, 1894; Shoshone, Idaho, U.S.
- Died: May 30, 1985 (aged 90); East Glacier Park, Montana, U.S.
- Education: University of Idaho; Harvard University; Yale School of Drama
- Occupations: Playwright; Screenwriter
- Years active: 1931–1965

Talbot Lanham Jennings (August 25, 1894 – May 30, 1985) was an American playwright and screenwriter. He received two Academy Award nominations for co-writing the screenplays for Mutiny on the Bounty (1935) and Anna and the King of Siam (1946).

== Biography ==
He was born in 1894 in Shoshone, Idaho, his father was an Episcopal archdeacon for Idaho and Wyoming. He attended Nampa High School before World War I in which he saw active service as an artilleryman in the U.S. Army, where he fought in five major battles.

After to war he went to University of Idaho and graduated Phi Beta Kappa in 1924. He was president of the Associated Students and wrote Light on the Mountains, a state history set to music. He also edited the yearbook, Gem of the Mountains, and the Blue Bucket, the English Department literary publication.

Jennings did a master's degree at Harvard University, then attended Yale Drama School.

Talbot wrote and co-wrote 17 screenplays including Mutiny on the Bounty, Romeo and Juliet, Anna and the King of Siam, Knights of the Round Table, The Good Earth and Northwest Passage. He wrote many screenplays for television also. A story he wrote became The Sons of Katie Elder (1965), and was his last film.

In the 1940 B-movie The Devil's Pipeline, Richard Arlen and Andy Devine play characters named Talbot and Jennings, apparently an inside joke by one of its writers.

He died at East Glacier Park, Montana.

== Plays ==
- No More Frontier (1931)
- This Side of Idolatry (1933)

== Films ==
- We Live Again (1934) (uncredited)
- Mutiny on the Bounty (1935)
- Romeo and Juliet (1936)
- The Good Earth (1936)
- Conquest (1937)
- Marie Antoinette (1938) – uncredited
- Spawn of the North (1938) – uncredited
- Rulers of the Sea (1939)
- Northwest Passage (1940)
- Edison, the Man (1940)
- So Ends Our Night (1941)
- Ten Gentlemen from West Point (1942) – uncredited
- Frenchman's Creek (1944)
- Anna and the King of Siam (1946)
- Landfall (1949)
- The Black Rose (1950)
- Across the Wide Missouri (1951)
- Scaramouche (1952)
- Knights of the Round Table (1953)
- Untamed (1955)
- Escape to Burma (1955)
- Pearl of the South Pacific (1955)
- Gunsight Ridge (1957)
- The Naked Maja (1958)
- 77 Sunset Strip (1959) – "Abra-Cadaver"
- The Alaskans (1959) – "Starvation Stampede", "Winter Song"
- Adventures in Paradise (1960) – "The Siege of Troy"
- The Roaring '20s (1960) – "Among the Missing"
- The Sons of Katie Elder (1965) (written in 1965)
