= Armondo Linus Acosta =

American film director (born 1938)

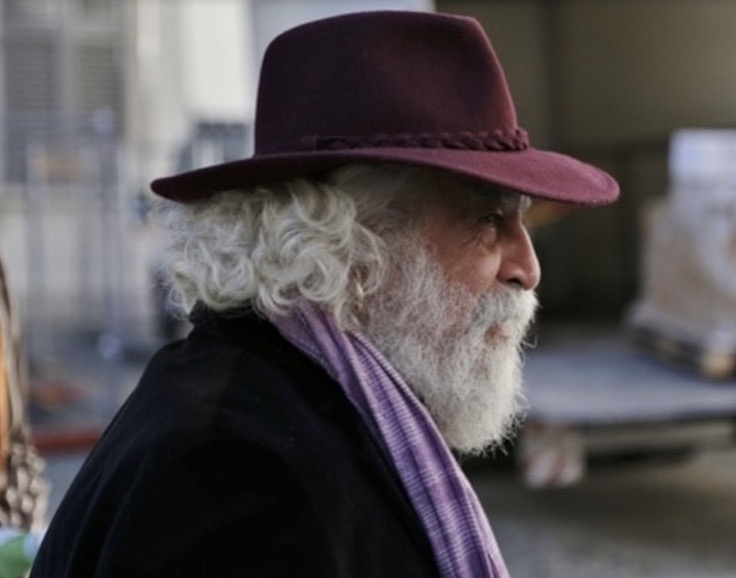
- Armondo Linus Acosta, Milan 2019
- Born: Bradford, Pennsylvania, US
- Other names: Armando Acosta, Armand Acosta
- Years active: 1954–present
- Known for: Romeo.Juliet; The Last Supper: The Living Tableau; The Communion: The Living Tableau

Armondo Linus Acosta (born 1938) is an American filmmaker, screenwriter, and cinematographer. He directed the 1990 film Romeo.Juliet and The Last Supper: The Living Tableau, a film recreation of Leonardo da Vinci's The Last Supper. Acosta’s career includes work in feature films, television, and visual design.

== Career ==
Acosta began his career in artist and repertoire and design consulting, creating album covers for producer Richard Bock, founder of Pacific Jazz Records (known in the 1960s as World Pacific Records).

From 1958 to 1963, Acosta collaborated with Roger Corman. Alongside Francis Ford Coppola, he served as a visual consultant on The Young Racers and Battle Beyond the Sun. Acosta also contributed to The Haunted Palace.

In 1962, Acosta was the film designer for the NBC variety show "The Lively Ones." The show, sponsored by Ford Motor Company, aired for two seasons on NBC. That same year, Pope John XXIII commissioned Acosta to create, write, and design a series of ten short feature films illustrating the Psalms. Acosta worked with Family Theater Productions and cinematographer James Crabe. The Psalms collection was screened in the Vatican Pavilion at the 1964 New York World's Fair. One of the short films, The Soldier, featuring William Shatner, was screened at the 1964 Venice Film Festival. The Soldier won awards in the international film festival circuit, along with receiving industry recognition.

In 1967, Acosta was named the head of the newly formed Crewe Co. Films Inc. Chairman Robert Crewe announced the appointment and declared the company's entry into the motion picture industry.

Acosta was represented for over three decades by show business agent Dennis Selinger of ICM London.

=== Romeo.Juliet ===
After establishing his own company, Moonseed Productions, Acosta started working on his first full-length motion picture in 1988. He served as director, writer, cinematographer, and producer. The film is an interpretation of Romeo and Juliet and features music from Sergei Prokofiev's Romeo and Juliet ballet performed by the London Symphony Orchestra and conducted by André Previn. The movie stars 120 street cats from Venice, Verona, Ghent, and New York City. The only human character, a Venetian bag lady, was played by John Hurt. The voice-over cast included actors Dame Maggie Smith, Vanessa Redgrave, Robert Powell, Sir Ben Kingsley, Francesca Annis, Victor Spinetti, and Quentin Crisp.

The world premiere of Romeo.Juliet was held on September 6, 1990 at the 47th Venice Film Festival. The film was also screened at the 1990 Film Fest Gent and Film Festival Cologne. In 1992, Romeo.Juliet was screened alongside a live orchestra at the Palais des Beaux-Arts in Brussels, with Nicholas Cleobury conducting the Belgium National Orchestra.

It was the first major full-length motion picture to be shot exclusively on Betacam video and then successfully transferred to 35mm film.

=== The Last Supper: The Living Tableau ===
“The Last Supper: The Living Tableau", a 'Tableau vivant,' is a stand-alone film recreation of Leonardo da Vinci's painting The Last Supper, and the opening sequence of Acosta's feature film project, The Last Supper – A Divine Prophecy.

“The Last Supper: The Living Tableau" was created in collaboration with multiple Academy Award winners Vittorio Storaro (cinematography), Dante Ferretti (production design), and Francesca Lo Schiavo (set decoration).

The short film has a nine-minute running time and recreates Leonardo da Vinci's “The Last Supper”, reflecting the original fresco's science of perspective, proportion, and light. The accompanying musical score is Rossini’s Stabat Mater. It is Acosta's first of four Tableaus recreating Renaissance masterworks. The film was shot at the Academy One Studios in Ghent, part of The Academy of the Subtle Arts which Acosta founded in 1996.

The world premiere of “The Last Supper: The Living Tableau" took place in partnership with the Vatican Museums, Comune di Milano, SKIRA, Milano Leonardo 500, and Palazzo Reale, on October 8, 2019, at the Palazzo Reale Museum in Milan during their “The Last Supper, Timeless Inspiration" installment.

There have been several projections and screenings of the film before and after the premiere:

- In commemoration of the 500th anniversary of da Vinci's passing, "The Last Supper: The Living Tableau", was first projected (September 21, 2019) onto the Tongerlo Abbey façade, Westerlo, Belgium, home to a 16th-century reproduction of da Vinci's "The Last Supper". And, as a “thank you” to the city of Ghent from Acosta, the film was projected onto the façade of Ghent's Saint Bavo's Cathedral (September 28, 2019).
- During Easter Week 2021, the film was projected in Italy on the façade of Santa Maria delle Grazie, Milan, the location of da Vinci's original “The Last Supper”; in Rome at The Church of Santa Maria di Montesanto, also known as the Church of the Artists, la Chiesa degli Artisti di Piazza del Popolo; and, in Israel at Saint Anne's Basilica, in Jerusalem's Old City, near the traditional start of the Via Dolorosa.
- In June 2021, the film was screened over a three-day period screened inside the dome of the Church of Santa Maria di Montesanto, a.k.a. Church of the Artists, la Chiesa degli Artisti di Piazza del Popolo. As a gesture of grace and gratitude to Don Walter Insero, Acosta installed his Maria Santissima Bambina – a rare antique plaster/stucco statuette of the Blessed Virgin as an infant, a figurine venerated by Catholics around the world.
- The film was screened at the Belgian Embassy at the invitation of Patrick Renault, Ambassador to the Holy See on April 5, 2022. It was projected in the Frasassi Caves, April 10–18 with an Easter Mass held in the Tempio di Valadier Chapel, a.k.a. Sanctuary of Santa Maria Infra Saxa, Genga; over Easter in Matera at the Palazzo dell’Annunziata, at the Centro Cultural La Misericordia (both in Italy) and at the Centro Cultural La Misericordia, Palma de Mallorca, Spain.
- “The Last Supper: The Living Tableau"’s American Premiere was held during Holy Week 2024, March 28–31, in Manhattan's Our Lady of Pompeii Church.
- The film's premiered in Mexico and was subsequently shown, March 28–30 and April 5 and 6 2024, at the Museo de Arte Contemporáneo Querétaro (MACQ).

=== Fra Angelico, Michelangelo and Donatello ===
Acosta's second tableau, "The Communion: The Living Tableau" is based on Fra Angelico's "Communion of the Apostles." Also filmed at the Academy One Studios, the ten-minute film premiered in Florence at the San Marco Museum (February 18, 2023), home to Fra Angelico's work. The soundtrack is Rossini's Stabat Mater: Quando corpus morietur.

Acosta's third and fourth Tableaus, both in post-production are Michelangelo's “Pietà: The Living Tableau” and “Habakkuk: The Living Tableau”, based on Donatello's sculpture (in post-production).

All four of Acosta's Tableaus are stand-alone sequences, in addition to being included in his next feature film, The Last Supper – A Divine Prophecy.

== Spiritual life ==
While the head of Crewe Films in the late 1960s, Acosta settled in Bruges, Belgium. He received a spiritual initiation from Swami Muktananda, becoming Jivanmukta Swami Ganapati. A small spiritual/meditation community developed around his teachings and experiences during his time away from the secular world. In 1987, he established the first Siddha Shiva Yoga Center located in Ghent, Belgium. Additional centers were subsequently opened in New York, NY, Escondido, California, and Rome, Italy.

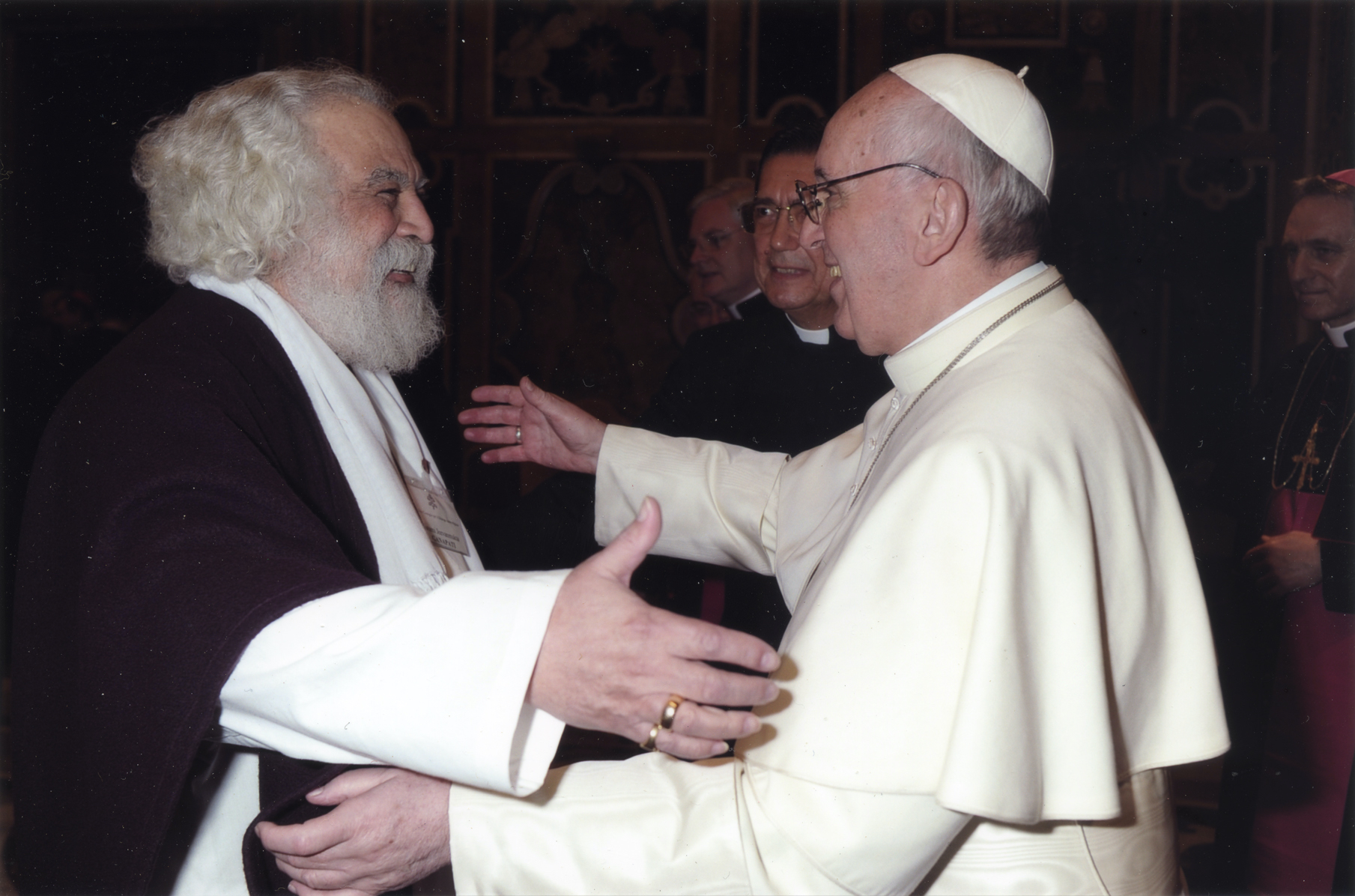
Jivanmukta Swami Ganapati/Armondo Linus Acosta and newly elected Pope Francis during the Papal Inaugural Celebrations at the Apostolic Palace in the Vatican, March 2013.

He returned to Rome on March 19 and 20, 2013, for the newly elected Pope Francis' Papal Inaugural Mass and celebrations. During a meeting between spiritual leaders held by Pope Francis in the Apostolic Palace, Ganapati gifted the new pontiff with a silver bas-relief of “The Last Supper.”

On March 19, 2015, Ganapati spoke at the European Parliament during the Religions for Peace - Global Network of Religions for Children presentation.

On April 28, 2015, Ganapati, plus 100 dignitaries and spiritual leaders, attended Pope Francis' Pontifical Academy of Sciences, Protect the Earth, Dignify Humanity. The Moral Dimensions of Climate Change and Sustainable Humanity.

Ganapati reunited with Pope Francis at the Interfaith Prayer Service at the National September 11 Memorial & Museum held on September 25, 2015, as well as the World Day of Prayer for Peace in Assisi, Italy, for international spiritual leaders on September 20, 2016.

On September 28, 2024 Ganapati was reunited with Pope Francis during the pontiff's Apostolic Journey to Belgium. The Roman Catholic Archdiocese of Mechelen-Brussels invited Ganapati to install his full-size replica of Michelangelo's Pietà (commissioned in Rome) and his Maria Santissima Bambina statuette in the Basilica of the Sacred Heart, a.k.a. Basilique Nationale du Sacré-Cœur, as a welcome gift to Pope Francis.

== Credits ==
=== Filmography (general) ===
- Touch of Evil (1958), Orson Welles, director
- Two Women or La Ciociara (1960), Vittorio De Sica, director
- El Cid (1961), Anthony Mann, director
- Judgment at Nuremberg (1961), Stanley Kramer, director
- Days of Wine and Roses (1962), Blake Edwards, director
- Experiment in Terror (1962), Blake Edwards, director
- Lawrence of Arabia (1962), David Lean, director
- The Connection (1962), Shirley Clarke, director
- What Ever Happened to Baby Jane? (1962), Robert Aldrich, director
- War Hunt (1962), Denis Sanders, director
- "The Soldier" (1962), from the PSALMS
- "Wonder" (1962), from the PSALMS
- Gay Purr-ee (1962), animated film, Abe Levitow, director
- The Lord is My Shepherd (1962) from the PSALMS
- "The Escape" (1962) from the PSALMS
- The Young Racers (1963), Roger Corman, director
- The Haunted Palace (1963), Roger Corman, director
- The Birds (1963), Alfred Hitchcock, director
- It's a Mad, Mad, Mad, Mad World (1963) Stanley Kramer, director
- The Pink Panther (1963), Blake Edwards, director
- Battle Beyond the Sun (1967), Roger Corman, director

=== Filmography (director) ===
- Romeo.Juliet (1990)
- "The Last Supper: The Living Tableau" (2019)
- "The Communion: The Living Tableau" (2023)
- “Pietà: The Living Tableau” (post-production)
- “Habakkuk: The Living Tableau” (post-production)
- "The Last Supper – A Divine Prophecy" (in production)
- "Shooting Stars" (post-production)
- "Joy" (pre-production)

=== Television ===
- "Follow the Sun" (1961–1962), series, United States
- "The Lively Ones" (1962–1963), series, United States
