= Romeo.Juliet =

1990 film by Armondo Linus Acosta

- Directed by: Armondo Linus Acosta
- Written by: Armando Acosta; Koen Van Brabant; Victor Spinetti (Consultant)
- Based on: Romeo and Juliet; 1597 play by William Shakespeare
- Produced by: Paul Hespel (Exec. Prod.); Paul Celis; Lanny Mickelson; Andree Castagnee; Armando Acosta; Greet Ooms (Assoc.); Geert Van Deynse (Assoc.)
- Starring: Sir John Hurt; Dame Maggie Smith; Sir Ben Kingsley; Robert Powell; Vanessa Redgrave; Francesca Annis; Quentin Crisp; Victor Spinetti; John Haggart
- Cinematography: Armando Acosta
- Edited by: Jan Reniers; Armando Acosta
- Music by: Emanuel Vardi (Original Theme) with Armando Acosta
- Distributed by: Moonseed Productions; Academy of Film and the Arts
- Release date: 1990
- Running time: 130 minutes
- Country: Belgium
- Language: English

Romeo.Juliet is a 1990 Belgian film adaptation of William Shakespeare's Romeo and Juliet, directed by Armando Acosta. The film features a cast of feral cats from Venice, New York City, Verona, and Ghent, voiced by British actors including John Hurt, Dame Maggie Smith, Sir Ben Kingsley, Vanessa Redgrave, and Francesca Annis. The production combines live-action footage of cats with Sergei Prokofiev’s Romeo and Juliet ballet music, performed by the London Symphony Orchestra. The film premiered out of competition at the 47th Venice International Film Festival on 6 September 1990.

== Plot ==
'La Dame aux Chats' (The Lady of Cats) is the only human character in Romeo.Juliet. She is an eccentric Venetian bag lady who lives with her pet rat on a houseboat named Fellini. She saves the lives of Juliet (a white Turkish Angora) and her feline family by smuggling them onto a ship bound for the New World. Soon after arriving in the docks of New York, Juliet meets Romeo—a long-haired gray feral.

== Inspiration ==
While working in Hollywood in the early 1960s, Acosta observed feral cats who made their home on the back lot of Paramount Pictures. He became fascinated by them and decided to film cats in their natural habitat and edit the footage to music.

It was not until 1964, when armed with an Arriflex camera, that Acosta began filming the street cats of New York City, using slow-motion techniques to capture their movements.

Acosta's reported aim was to capture the essence of the star-crossed lovers story trope, taking inspiration from both Shakespeare's original play and in the ancient tale of Layla and Majnun.

According to Acosta, "These stories suggest a hidden truth that the highest love is beyond the body. Cat lovers, animal lovers understand this 'higher love' – a love of devotion, responsibility and respect".

While most of the footage was shot in 1964, the final film would not be released until 1990, primarily due to budgetary and technological constraints.

== Script ==
An original screenplay was written by Koen Vanbrabant with Acosta. British actor and theater personality Victor Spinetti served as the script consultant.

== Cast ==
- Robert Powell as Romeo Montague
- Francesca Annis as Juliet Capulet
- Vanessa Redgrave as Lady Capulet
- Ben Kingsley as Lord Capulet
- John Hurt as Mercutio
- Maggie Smith as Rosaline Capulet
- Victor Spinetti as Tybalt
- Quentin Crisp as Benvolio Montague
- John Haggart as Prince Escalus
- Theo Cowan as Friar Lawrence

== La Dame aux Chats ==
'La Dame aux Chats' is performed in a cameo appearance by British actor, John Hurt. In an interview by the BBC, Hurt explained, "...he needed a cat lady who lives on a barge who collects the cats of Venice together and takes them to the New World where the story begins. A cat lady, a bag lady in fact, who lives on a barge and I'm the only human being in it."

When Hurt was asked why he accepted the role of a Venetian bag lady, he replied, “I’m sort of used to transformations, that’s my living. But I haven’t very often gone this far. Hurt also explained, "The whole idea is unique as far as I know. I've never heard of such a thing, and I thought indeed, it would make a fascinating film." Later he jokingly added, "It's very much a supporting role."

Acosta explained, "I wanted 'La Dame' to have that neutral quality, this sort of male-female never knowing quality. John was not only an actor of great ingenuity and power of invention, he understood transformation."

== Music ==
The soundtrack features Serge Prokofiev's ballet music Romeo and Juliet performed by the London Symphony Orchestra and conducted by André Previn. Acosta chose Previn for his 'swan-like' conductor's quality. Previn's interpretation of the Prokofiev score runs 7-10% slower than most other recorded performances.

The original Romeo.Juliet Theme, composed by Emanuel Vardi and Armando Acosta, is performed by the London Symphony Orchestra, conducted by Barry Wordsworth.

== Locations ==
The film was shot on location in Ghent, Manhattan, Coney Island, Venice and Santa Monica with many interiors filmed in the Roncalli Circus warehouse in Cologne.

== Technical ==
Romeo.Juliet is the first full-length motion picture to be filmed exclusively on video and transferred onto 35mm.

To allow the natural choreography and movement of the cats to be synchronized with the soundtrack, 99% of the film was shot in digital slow motion.

Romeo.Juliet has been acknowledged as a pioneering technical achievement by Academy Award winning cinematographer, Linwood Dunn and other motion picture specialists.

== World premiere ==
Romeo.Juliet held its world premiere on 6 September 1990 at the 47th Venice International Film Festival. The late festival director Guglielmo Biraghi, a colleague of Acosta and a known cat enthusiast, invited the film to screen out of competition.

The premiere received attention from European critics and journalists. Henri Chapier of the French television network France 2 described it as “a baroque, almost surreal art film with an enormous budget,” adding that the production “tells Shakespeare’s play through the confrontation of two rival tribes of cats.”

In its coverage of the festival, The Sunday Times described Romeo.Juliet as “the strangest film on show,” noting its use of Prokofiev’s music and performances by voice actors Robert Powell, Sir Ben Kingsley, Vanessa Redgrave, and Dame Maggie Smith, accompanied by live-action footage of cats filmed in Venice, Ghent, and Coney Island.

== Additional screenings ==
Romeo.Juliet was also shown at the 1990 Flanders International Film Festival Ghent.

In January 1992, the film was screened in Los Angeles at the Writers Guild Theater and at Warner Bros. Studios.

In June 1994, Romeo.Juliet returned to Venice for three special screenings, organized by Constanza Farinelli as part of the Cat Congress and Symposium.

== Film concerts ==
Romeo.Juliet was conceived as a film-in-concert, designed to be accompanied by a live orchestral performance of its soundtrack. The Romeo.Juliet Film-in-Concert World Premiere took place in June 1992 at the Palais des Beaux-Arts in Brussels.

British conductor Nicholas Cleobury led the National Orchestra of Belgium in three performances. Actor John Hurt and artist Oleg Prokofiev, son of composer Sergei Prokofiev, attended the premiere at the invitation of director Armando Acosta.

In an interview, Oleg Prokofiev described the production as “not simply a film, [but] a poem... a special cinema which harmoniously blends my father’s ballet music, Shakespeare’s text, and the film’s imagery.”

In February 1993, additional film-in-concert performances were held at NHK Hall in Tokyo, conducted by Yoko Matsuo with the New Japan Philharmonic Orchestra, attended by Acosta.
