= Chee Kong Cheah =

Singaporean director, writer and producer

CheeK
- Born: Cheah Chee Kong
- Occupations: Director, Writer, Producer
- Known for: Chicken Rice War The Kitchen Musical

Cheah Chee Kong, also known as CheeK, is a Malaysia-born Singaporean director, writer, TV series creator, producer and creative media executive. The feature film Chicken Rice War and musical drama series The Kitchen Musical are some of his notable works. The Kitchen Musical was nominated for two awards at the International Emmy Awards 2012. 9 November 2015 – CheeK has been appointed to the newly created position of Chief Content Officer at MediaCorp Singapore. 2018 – Disney North Asia (China, Japan, Korea) Creative and Content Development; conceptualize and develop local original scripted series and non-scripted formats. June 2020 - key member of team that launched Disney+ in Japan in charge of Programming, Content and Creative

== Career ==
CheeK began his career in television and film-making in 1990 as a Current Affairs producer at the former Singapore Broadcasting Corporation. He is a creative professional with more than 30 years of experience in entertainment, films and television production in Asia. He has held various senior management positions at MTV Asia, MTV Japan, STAR TV." and Disney.

Apart from his broadcasting career, Cheek is also a film and TV series maker/creator. He started in short film making and won the Best Short Film award at the Singapore International Film Festival in 1994 for his short film, Married. In 1997, he won the Best Short Film and Special Achievement with Beansprouts and Salted Fish.

CheeK wrote, produced and directed his début feature film Chicken Rice War in 2000, which garnered international awards such as the Discovery Award at the 2001 Toronto International Film Festival. He was also awarded the Young Artist (Film) Award by The National Arts Council of Singapore that same year.

CheeK was the Executive Vice President and Head of Creative for The Group Entertainment where he created, directed, co-wrote and executive produced the TV series, The Kitchen Musical, which premiered on AXN Asia on 21 October 2011 in 19 countries across Asia. There has been strong interest in adapting the series for various markets including the USA.

On April 18, 2012, it has been publicly announced that The Kitchen Musical won Gold World Medal for Best Writing, and Bronze World Medal for Best Performance at the 2012 New York Festivals International Television & Film Awards. The Kitchen Musical was also nominated for two International Emmy Awards (Best Drama Series and Best Performance by an Actor) in 2012.

In October 2013, Scripps Networks Interactive, Asia Pacific (Food Network Asia, Asian Food Channel, Travel Channel, HGTV) announced that it has hired CheeK as the Head of Creative, Content and Marketing, responsible for developing and executing programming strategies, original productions, and setting the creative and marketing direction for Scripps’ channels in the region.

On 19 October 2015, MediaCorp Singapore appointed CheeK to the newly created position of Chief Content Officer to drive the content strategy and development for its extensive portfolio of entertainment products across its TV and digital platforms as well as content syndication for local and international markets. He will also oversee The Celebrity Agency. 2018 – Disney North Asia (China, Japan, Korea) Creative and Content Development; conceptualize and develop local original scripted series and non-scripted formats. June 2020 - key member of team that launched Disney+ in Japan in charge of Programming, Content and Creative

== Personal life ==
A wine enthusiast with a Diploma in Wines and Spirits from WSET, Certified Sommelier (Court of Master Sommeliers), French Wine Scholar and Certified Sake Sommelier certifications.

== Filmography ==
=== Films ===
Year	Film	Notes
1994	Married (Short Film)	Singapore International Film Festival − Best Short Film (1994)
1997	Bean Sprouts and Salted Fish (Short Film)	Singapore International Film Festival − Best Short Film, Special Achievement Award (1997)
2000	Stories About Love	Director
2000	Chicken Rice War	Director, writer, producer 2001 Toronto International Film Festival − Won; Miami International Film Festival (2002) − Won; Buenos Aires International Festival of Independent Cinema (2002) − Won
2002	Digital Compassion 02 (Documentary)	Director

=== Television ===
Year	Film	Notes
2004	Rouge	Director
2011–2012	The Kitchen Musical	Director, writer, producer New York Festivals International Television & Film Awards (2012) − (Gold) Best Writing; New York Festivals International Television & Film Awards (2012) − (Bronze) Best Performance; International Emmy Awards (2012) – Nominee for Best Drama Series and Best Performance by an Actor
