= Romeo and Juliet (1936 film) =

1936 film by George Cukor

- 1936 US Theatrical Poster
- Directed by: George Cukor
- Written by: Talbot Jennings
- Based on: Romeo and Juliet; 1597 play by William Shakespeare
- Produced by: Irving Thalberg
- Starring: Norma Shearer; Leslie Howard; John Barrymore; Basil Rathbone; Andy Devine
- Cinematography: William H. Daniels
- Edited by: Margaret Booth
- Music by: Herbert Stothart
- Production company: Metro-Goldwyn-Mayer
- Distributed by: Loew's Inc.
- Release date: August 20, 1936
- Running time: 125 minutes
- Country: United States
- Language: English
- Budget: $2 million
- Box office: $962,000 (Domestic earnings); $1,113,000 (Foreign earnings)

Romeo and Juliet is a 1936 American film adapted from the play by William Shakespeare, directed by George Cukor from a screenplay by Talbot Jennings. The film stars Leslie Howard as Romeo and Norma Shearer as Juliet, and the supporting cast features John Barrymore, Basil Rathbone, and Andy Devine.

Cukor's 1936 adaptation stays largely faithful to Shakespeare's text.

== Plot ==
In the Italian city of Verona, two noble families, the Montagues and the Capulets, are locked in a bitter feud. Despite the longstanding animosity between their families, Romeo Montague and Juliet Capulet meet and fall deeply in love at a masquerade ball.

The two secretly marry with the help of Juliet's nurse and Friar Laurence, hoping that their union might bring peace to their feuding families. However, the street brawls between the Montagues and Capulets intensify. Mercutio, Romeo's close friend, is killed by Tybalt, Juliet's cousin. In a fit of rage, Romeo avenges Mercutio's death by killing Tybalt, leading to his banishment from Verona.

Juliet is devastated by both Tybalt's death and Romeo's banishment. Her parents, unaware of her secret marriage to Romeo, arrange for her to marry Paris. Desperate to avoid this fate and be with Romeo, Juliet takes a potion that makes her appear dead. Romeo, not knowing it is a ruse and believing Juliet to be truly dead, returns to Verona and takes poison beside her. Juliet awakens, finds Romeo dead, and kills herself.

The tragic deaths of the young lovers lead the Montagues and Capulets to reconcile, but it is a reconciliation born from great loss and sorrow.

== Cast ==
- Norma Shearer as Juliet
- Leslie Howard as Romeo
- John Barrymore as Mercutio
- Edna May Oliver as the Nurse
- Basil Rathbone as Tybalt
- C. Aubrey Smith as Lord Capulet
- Andy Devine as Peter, a servant
- Conway Tearle as Escalus – Prince of Verona
- Ralph Forbes as Paris
- Henry Kolker as Friar Laurence
- Robert Warwick as Lord Montague
- Virginia Hammond as Lady Montague
- Reginald Denny as Benvolio
- Violet Kemble-Cooper as Lady Capulet

Uncredited cast includes Wallis Clark, Katherine DeMille, Fred Graham, Dorothy Granger, Ronald Howard, Lon McCallister, and Ian Wolfe.

== Production ==
=== Development ===
Producer Irving Thalberg pushed MGM for five years to make a film of Romeo and Juliet, in spite of studio head Louis B. Mayer's resistance. Mayer believed that the mass audience considered the Bard over their heads, and also he was concerned with the studio's budget constraints during the early years of the Great Depression. It was only when Jack L. Warner announced his intention to film Max Reinhardt's A Midsummer Night's Dream at Warner Bros. that Mayer, not to be outdone, gave Thalberg the go-ahead. The success of a 1934 Broadway revival also encouraged the idea of a film version; that version starred Katharine Cornell as Juliet, Basil Rathbone as Romeo, Brian Aherne as Mercutio, and Edith Evans as The Nurse. Rathbone is the only actor from the 1934 revival to appear in the film, albeit in the role of Tybalt rather than Romeo. On the stage, Tybalt was played by nineteen-year-old Orson Welles.

Thalberg's stated intention was "to make the production what Shakespeare would have wanted had he possessed the facilities of cinema." He went to great lengths to establish authenticity and the film's intellectual credentials: researchers were sent to Verona to take photographs for the designers; the paintings of Botticelli, Bellini, Carpaccio, and Gozzoli were studied to provide visual inspiration; and two academic advisers (John Tucker Murray of Harvard and William Strunk Jr. of Cornell) were flown to the set, with instructions to criticize the production freely. The actor Rollo Peters, who had starred as Romeo and designed the sets for the 1923 Broadway production of Romeo and Juliet, worked as a consultant for the film.

=== Production ===
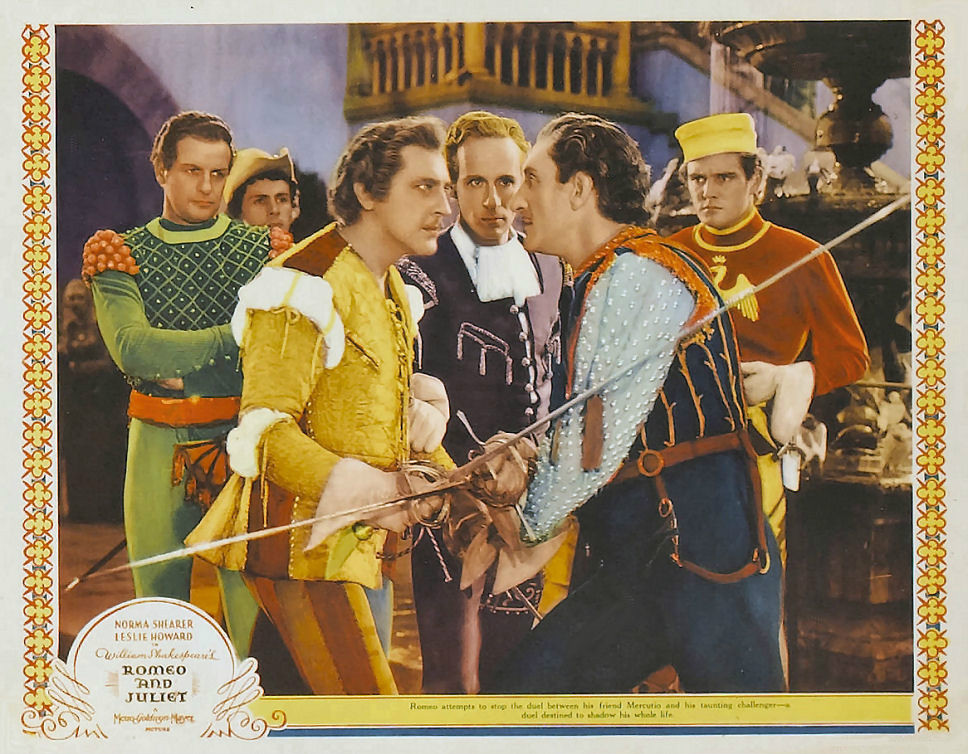
John Barrymore, Leslie Howard and Basil Rathbone from a lobby card

Thalberg had only one choice for director: George Cukor, who was known as "the women's director". Thalberg's vision was that the performance of Norma Shearer, his wife, would dominate the picture. In addition to such noted Shakespearean actors as Howard and Barrymore, Thalberg cast many screen actors and brought in East Coast drama coaches (such as Frances Robinson Duff who coached Shearer) to teach them. In consequence, actors previously noted for naturalism were found to give more stage-like performances. The shoot extended to six months, and the budget reached $2 million, MGM's most expensive sound film up to that time.

As in most Shakespeare-based screenplays, Cukor and his screenwriter Talbot Jennings cut much of the original play, using around 45% of it. Many of these cuts are common ones in the theatre, such as the second chorus and the comic scene of Peter with the musicians. Others are filmic: designed to replace words with action, or rearranging scenes in order to introduce groups of characters in longer narrative sequences. Jennings retained more of Shakespeare's poetry for the young lovers than any of his big-screen successors. Several scenes are interpolated, including three sequences featuring Friar John in Mantua. In contrast, the role of Friar Laurence (an important character in the play) is much reduced. A number of scenes are expanded as opportunities for visual spectacle, including the opening brawl (set against the backdrop of a religious procession), the wedding and Juliet's funeral. The party scene, choreographed by Agnes de Mille, includes Rosaline (an unseen character in Shakespeare's script) who rebuffs Romeo. The role of Peter is enlarged, and played by Andy Devine as a faint-hearted bully. He speaks lines which Shakespeare gave to other Capulet servants, making him the instigator of the opening brawl. The film includes two songs drawn from other plays by Shakespeare: "Come Away Death" from Twelfth Night and "Honour, Riches, Marriage, Blessing" from The Tempest.

Clusters of images are used to define the central characters: Romeo is first sighted leaning against a ruined building in an arcadian scene, complete with a pipe-playing shepherd and his dog; the livelier Juliet is associated with Capulet's formal garden, with its decorative fish pond.

Herbert Stothart draws on Tchaikovsky's Fantasy Overture "Romeo and Juliet" when creating the film's score. Stothart also uses the stately Pavane from Peter Warlock's Capriol Suite. Neither of these sources are credited.

== Premiere ==
On the night of the Los Angeles premiere of the film at the Carthay Circle Theatre, legendary MGM producer Irving Thalberg, husband of Norma Shearer, died, aged 37. The stars in attendance were so grief-stricken that publicist Frank Whitbeck, standing in front of the theater, abandoned his usual policy of interviewing them for a radio broadcast as they entered and simply announced each one as he or she arrived.

== Reception ==
According to MGM records, the film earned $2,075,000 worldwide but because of its high production cost lost $922,000.

Some critics liked the film, but on the whole, neither critics nor the public responded enthusiastically. Graham Greene wrote that he was "less than ever convinced that there is an aesthetic justification for filming Shakespeare at all... the effect of even the best scenes is to distract." "Ornate but not garish, extravagant but in perfect taste, expansive but never overwhelming, the picture reflects great credit upon its producers and upon the screen as a whole", wrote Frank Nugent in a rave review for The New York Times. "It is a dignified, sensitive and entirely admirable Shakespearean—not Hollywoodean—production." Variety called the film a "faithful" adaptation with "very beautiful" costuming, but also found it "not too imaginative" and "a long sit" at over two hours. Film Daily raved that it was a "superb and important achievement" and "one of the most important contributions to the screen since the inception of talking pictures." John Mosher of The New Yorker called it "a very definite achievement" but "somewhat cumbersome", writing "This is a good, sensible presentation of 'Romeo and Juliet,' but it won't be one you'll hark back to when you are discussing the movies as great art, if you do ever discuss them as great art."

Many moviegoers considered the film too "arty", staying away as they had from Warner's A Midsummer Night's Dream the previous year; this led Hollywood to abandon the Bard for over a decade. The film nevertheless received four Oscar nominations and for many years was considered one of the great MGM classics. In his annual Movie and Video Guide, Leonard Maltin gives both this film version and the popular 1968 Franco Zeffirelli version (with Olivia Hussey and Leonard Whiting) an equal rating of three-and-a-half stars.

More recently, scholar Stephen Orgel describes Cukor's film as "largely miscast ... with a preposterously mature pair of lovers in Leslie Howard and Norma Shearer, and an elderly John Barrymore as a stagey Mercutio decades out of date." Barrymore was in his fifties, and played Mercutio as a flirtatious tease. Orgel adds that Tybalt, often portrayed as a hot-headed troublemaker, is played by Basil Rathbone as stuffy and pompous.

Patricia Tatspaugh observes that subsequent film versions made use of "younger, less experienced but more photogenic actors" in the central roles. Cukor, interviewed in 1970, said of this film: "It's one picture that if I had to do over again, I'd know how. I'd get the garlic and the Mediterranean into it."

== Awards and honors ==
Academy Award nominations	Nominee(s)
Best Picture	Irving Thalberg
Best Actress	Norma Shearer
Best Supporting Actor	Basil Rathbone
Best Art Direction	Art Direction and Interior Decoration: Cedric Gibbons, Fredric Hope, and Edwin B. Willis

In 2002, the American Film Institute nominated this film for AFI's 100 Years...100 Passions.

The film is listed in the book The New York Times' Guide to the Best 1,000 Movies Ever Made (1999 and 2004)).

== Legacy ==
The 2016 documentary Leslie Howard: The Man Who Gave a Damn featured a colour roll of 16mm Kodachrome, which was filmed by co-star Leslie Howard during the opening exterior sequence with Howard and Reginald Denny in costume as the crew set up.

== See also ==
- Romeo and Juliet on screen
