= The Tragedy of Romeo and Juliet (film) =

1982 film by William Woodman

- Directed by: William Woodman
- Based on: Romeo and Juliet; 1597 play by William Shakespeare
- Produced by: Christopher Viores; John H. Ward
- Starring: Blanche Baker; Alex Hyde-White; Fredric Lehne
- Cinematography: Jeff Barnes; Rick Caswell; Bob Keys; John Lee
- Music by: Mitch Margo
- Production company: Bard Productions
- Release date: January 1, 1982
- Running time: 165 minutes
- Country: United States
- Language: English

The Tragedy of Romeo and Juliet is a 1982 film adaptation of William Shakespeare's Romeo and Juliet, directed by William Woodman and starring Alex Hyde-White as Romeo and Blanche Baker as Juliet.

== Premise ==
Romeo and Juliet's families have been in a feud that causes these two lovers to make decisions that change lives forever. The story ends with the two lovers committing suicide.

== Cast ==
- Alex Hyde-White as Romeo
- Blanche Baker as Juliet
- Esther Rolle as Nurse
- Dan Hamilton as Mercutio
- William H. Bassett as Prince Escalus
- Dan Mason as Montague
- Kate Fitzmaurice as Lady Montague
- Peter Maclean as Capulet
- Penelope Windust as Lady Capulet
- Norman Snow as Tybalt
- Marco Barricelli as Paris
- Fredric Lehne as Benvolio
- Alvah Stanley as Friar Laurence
