= Chicken Rice War =

- Directed by: Chee Kong Cheah (CheeK)
- Written by: Chee Kong Cheah (CheeK)
- Produced by: David Leong; Suat Yen Lim
- Starring: Pierre Png; May Yee Lum; Catherine Sng; Gary Yuen; Kevin Murphy; Kelvin Ng; Su Ching Teh; Wui Seng Cheong; Irene Ong; Weng Kee Lee; Gary Loh; Jo Jo Struys; Randall Tan; Zalina Abdul Hamid; Mohan Sachden
- Cinematography: Daniel Low
- Edited by: Lawrence Ng
- Release date: 16 November 2000
- Running time: 100 min
- Country: Singapore
- Language: Cantonese / English

Chicken Rice War is a Singaporean romantic comedy film released in 2000 by Raintree Pictures. It is an adaptation of Romeo and Juliet in a Singaporean setting, where fierce competition between rival chicken rice hawkers resulted in bitter enmity. The old feud between chicken rice hawker families' stand in the way of their young offspring who fell for one another.

== Synopsis ==
Chicken Rice War is loosely based on William Shakespeare's Romeo and Juliet. In this movie the Montagues and Capulets are represented by the families Wong and Chan. Both families run Chicken Rice stalls side by side in the same market, something that the authorities say is impossible, since it is not allowed. The underlying conflict is about the secret family recipes that has been kept secret for generations, but apart from that nobody really knows what the fight is about.

Audrey Chan is a beautiful, vain and spoilt girl who is the most popular girl in school. Fenson Wong is an insecure young man with a stutter who, of course, is madly in love with Audrey. Their only common interest is Shakespeare and the version of Romeo and Juliet that they are setting up at school. When Fenson gets the chance to replace Audrey's beautiful but dim boyfriend as Romeo he starts seriously dreaming about capturing Audrey's heart.

== Cast ==
- Pierre Png as Fenson Wong
- May Yee Lum as Audrey Chan
- Catherine Sng as Wong Ku
- Gary Yuen as Vincent Chan
- Kevin Murphy as Leon Deli
- Kelvin Ng as Sydney Wong
- Su Ching Teh as Penelope Chan
- Wui Seng Cheong as Wong Terr
- Irene Ong as Wendy Chan
- Weng Kee Lee as Chan Tick
- Gary Loh as Muscle Mike
- Jo Jo Struys as Cheryl
- Randall Tan as Nick Carter
- Zalina Abdul Hamid as Fat Lady
- Mohan Sachden as Muthiah
- Alias Kadir as Ahmad
- Edmund L. Smith as Mr. Pillay
- Paul Tan as TV presenter
- Tanya Chua as Herself
- Jonathan Lim as Hugo A Go Goh
- Uttsada Panichkul as Himself
- Kevin Poh as Capulet
- Jamie Yeo as Herself

== Awards ==
- Discovery Award at the 2001 Toronto International Film Festival
- Special Jury Award Miami Film Festival 2002
- Nominee Best Film Buenos Aires International Festival of Independent Cinema 2002
