= 1562 in literature =

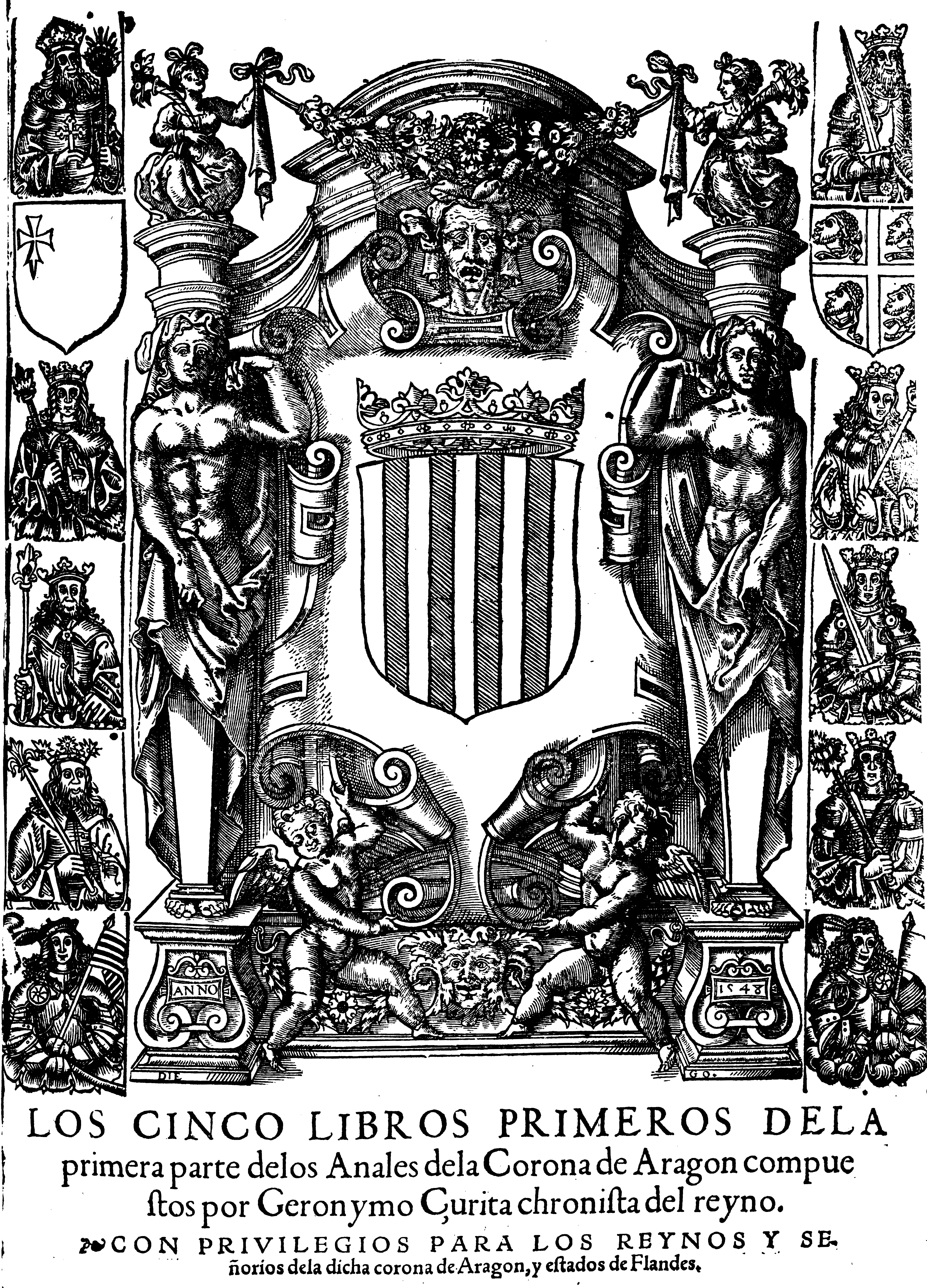
Title page of Jerónimo Zurita’s Anales de la Corona de Aragón, published in Zaragoza in 1562.

This article contains information about the literary events and publications of 1562.

== Events ==
- January 18 – First performance of Thomas Norton and Thomas Sackville's play Gorboduc before Queen Elizabeth I of England. It is the first known English tragedy and the first English-language play to employ blank verse.
- July 12 – Fray Diego de Landa, acting Bishop of Yucatán, burns the Maya codices (sacred books of the Maya) during the Spanish conquest of Yucatán.

== New books ==
=== Prose ===
- Magdeburger Centurien (Magdeburg Centuries), volumes V and VI
- Melchior Cano – De Locis theologicis (posthumously published)
- Petrus Ramus – Grammaire française
- Richard Smyth – De Missa Sacrificio

=== Drama ===
- Thomas Norton and Thomas Sackville – Gorboduc
- Nicholas Udall? - Jacke Jugeler

=== Poetry ===
- Arthur Brooke – The Tragical History of Romeus and Juliet

== Births ==
- January 13 – Mark Alexander Boyd, Scottish poet and soldier of fortune (died 1601)
- January 20 – Ottavio Rinuccini, Italian poet (died 1621)
- January 31 (bapt.) – Edward Blount, English publisher (died 1632)
- March – Francis Johnson, English Separatist theologian and polemicist (died 1618)
- March 27 – Jacob Gretser, German Jesuit writer (died 1625)
- August – Bartolomé Leonardo de Argensola, Spanish poet and historian (died 1631)
- November 25 – Lope de Vega, Spanish poet and dramatist (died 1635)
- Unknown dates
  - Henry Constable, English poet (died 1613)
  - Samuel Daniel, English poet (died 1619)
  - Francis Godwin, English writer and bishop (died 1633)
  - Johann Mechtel, German chronicler (died c. 1631)

== Deaths ==
- July 23 – Götz von Berlichingen, German knight immortalized by Goethe (born c. 1480)
- September 5 – Katharina Zell, Protestant writer (born c. 1497)
- November 6 – Achille Bocchi, Italian humanist writer (born 1488)
- November 12 – Pietro Martire Vermigli, Italian theologian (born 1499)
- Unknown dates
  - Matteo Bandello, Italian novelist (b. 1480)
  - Nicholas Grimald, English poet and theologian (b. 1519)
- Probable year – George Cavendish, English biographer (born 1494)
