= Romeo =

Character in Shakespeare's Romeo and Juliet

Romeo Montague
- Romeo and Juliet character
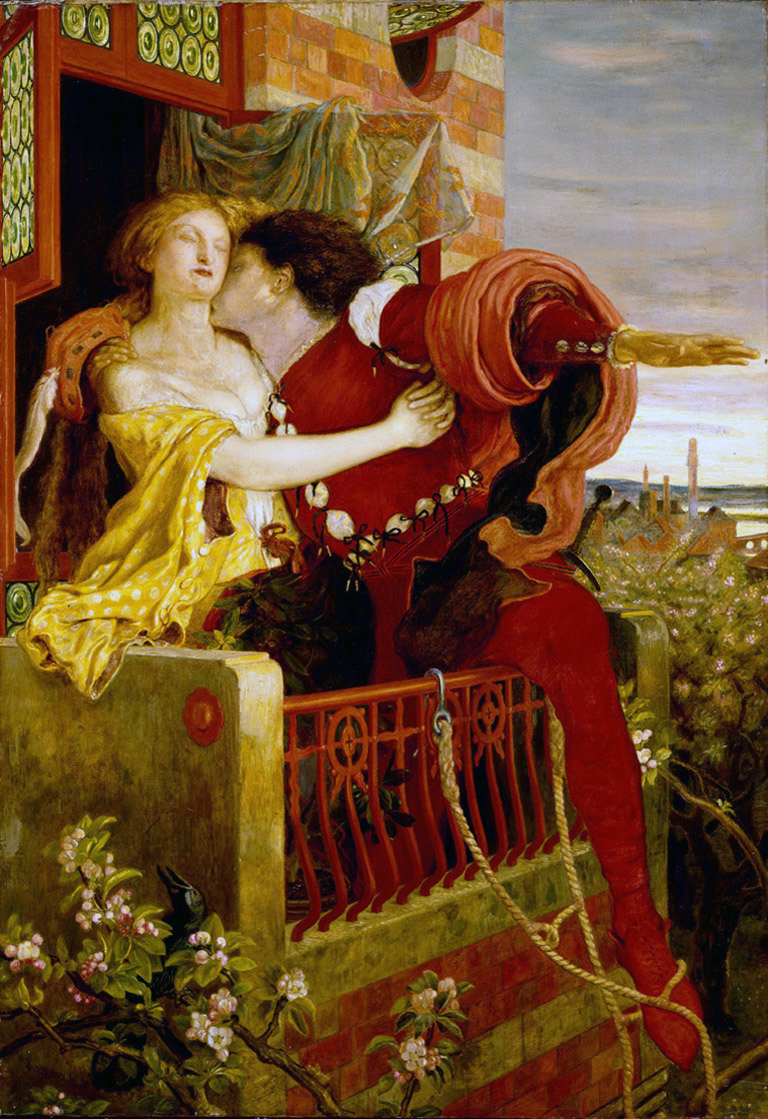
- The balcony scene in Romeo and Juliet as depicted by Ford Madox Brown (1869–70).
- First appearance: Romeo and Juliet; c. 1591–95
- Created by: William Shakespeare
- Based on: Romeus, from The Tragical History of Romeus and Juliet (1562)

In-universe information
- Family: Lord Montague (father); Lady Montague (mother); Lord Capulet (father-in-law); Lady Capulet (mother-in-law); Benvolio Montague (cousin); Tybalt Capulet (cousin by marriage); Rosaline Capulet (cousin by marriage)
- Spouse: Juliet Capulet
- Nationality: Italian

Romeo Montague (Italian: Romeo Montecchi [roˈmɛːo monˈtekki]) is the male protagonist of William Shakespeare's tragedy Romeo and Juliet. The son of Lord Montague and his wife, Lady Montague, he secretly loves and marries Juliet, a member of the rival House of Capulet, through a priest named Friar Laurence.

When Romeo was forced into exile after slaying Juliet's cousin, Tybalt, in a duel, Friar Laurence gives Juliet a sleeping potion that makes her seem dead for 42 hours and sent a letter to Romeo, but it never reached him. Romeo dies by suicide upon hearing falsely of Juliet's death. Juliet later dies upon waking to find Romeo dead.

The character's origins can be traced as far back as Pyramus, who appears in Ovid's Metamorphoses, but the first modern incarnation of Romeo is Mariotto in the 33rd of Masuccio Salernitano's Il Novellino (1476). This story was reworked in 1524 by Luigi da Porto as Giulietta e Romeo (published posthumously in 1531). Da Porto named the character Romeo Montecchi, and the storyline is nearly the same as Shakespeare's adaptation. Since no 16th-century direct English translation of Giulietta e Romeo is known, Shakespeare's main source is thought to be Arthur Brooke's English verse translation of a French translation of a 1554 adaptation by Matteo Bandello. Although both Salernitana and da Porto claimed that their stories had a historical basis, there is little evidence that this is the case.

Romeo, an only child like Juliet, is one of the most important characters of the play and has a consistent presence throughout it. His role as an idealistic lover has led the word "Romeo" to become a synonym for a passionate male lover in various languages.

== Origins ==
The earliest tale bearing a resemblance to Shakespeare's Romeo and Juliet is Xenophon of Ephesus' Ephesiaca, whose heroic figure is a Habrocomes. The character of Romeo is also similar to that of Pyramus in Ovid's Metamorphoses, a youth who is unable to meet the object of his affection due to an ancient family quarrel, and later kills himself due to mistakenly believing her to have been dead. Although it is unlikely that Shakespeare directly borrowed from Ovid while writing Romeo and Juliet, the story was likely an influence on the Italian writers whom the playwright was greatly indebted to. The two sources which Shakespeare most likely consulted are Brooke's translation of da Porto and William Painter's The goodly historye of the true, and constant Love between Romeo and Juliet.

== Film portrayals ==
Romeo and Juliet has been adapted into film several times, and the part of Romeo has been played by several actors, including

- Leonard Whiting in Franco Zeffirelli's 1968 film, Romeo and Juliet, opposite Olivia Hussey as Juliet.
- Leslie Howard in George Cukor's 1936 film, Romeo and Juliet, opposite Norma Shearer as Juliet.
- Laurence Harvey in Renato Castellani's 1954 film Romeo and Juliet.
- Leonardo DiCaprio in Baz Luhrmann's modernized 1996 version, Romeo + Juliet, alongside Claire Danes as Juliet.
- Douglas Booth in Carlo Carlei's 2013 Romeo and Juliet film adaptation, opposite Hailee Steinfeld as Juliet.
- Orlando Bloom in a Broadway adaptation in 2013.
- Jordan Luke Gage in the West End musical & Juliet.
- Kyle Allen plays the character in Rosaline (2022 film).
- Kit Connor in Sam Gold's 2024 Broadway adaptation, opposite Rachel Zegler as Juliet.
- Jamie Ward in Timothy Scott Bogart's 2025 film, Juliet & Romeo, opposite Clara Rugaard as Juliet.

• Ranveer Singh in Sanjay Leela Bhansali's 2013 film, Goliyon ki rasleela ram leela, Opposite Deepika Padukone as Juliet.

== Other portrayals ==
- Nice Peter in an episode of the YouTube comedy series Epic Rap Battles of History.

== Bibliography ==
- Shakespeare, William (1859). Romeo and Juliet:A tragedy. Leipzig: G. Græbner.
