= Garter (disambiguation) =

A garter is an article of clothing used to hold up stockings.

Garter may also refer to:

- Garter snake (Thamnophis), a genus of snakes endemic to North and Central America
- Sleeve garter, worn on the sleeve of a shirt
- Garter Principal King of Arms, the principal heraldic officer in the United Kingdom

== See also ==
- Order of the Garter
- Bernard Garter
- Garterbelt, a character from anime series Panty & Stocking with Garterbelt.
