= List of compositions by Imogen Holst =

These are sortable lists of compositions and arrangements by Imogen Holst. The first table lists original compositions, the second arrangements and adaptations by Imogen Holst of traditional folk tunes and works by other composers. The lists cover unpublished juvenilia from Holst's early teens to final works completed more than sixty years later. Title formats are those given in Christopher Tinker’s listing of works reprinted in the 2010 edition of ‘Imogen Holst: A Life in Music'. More detailed information about the publication and source materials of the music is included in that volume.

In her role of amanuensis to Benjamin Britten, Holst made numerous vocal and piano scores of Britten's works; these are not listed.

== List of works ==
Voice type key: S= soprano; A= alto; T= tenor; B= bass

=== Table 1: Original compositions ===
Genre	Year	Title	Forces (instrumental and vocal)	Notes
Chamber	1918	Sonata in D minor	Violin, viola, cello and piano	Opus 1 (only the first four works were numbered)
Unaccompanied tune	1918	Four English Christmas Carols		Opus 2
Instrumental	1918	Duet	Viola and piano	Opus 3
Instrumental	1920	The Masque of the Tempest	Flute, clarinet, triangle and strings	Opus 4
Choral	1921	Arrangement: "Resonet in Laudibus"	Unison voices and small orchestra	
Choral	1925	An Essex Rhapsody	Treble choir and orchestra	
Vocal	1925	Three songs (words: Walter de la Mare)	Treble voice, two violins and cello	
Vocal	1926	Two Four-part Rounds	Unaccompanied voices	
Vocal	1926	"Weathers" (song) (words: Thomas Hardy)	Solo voice and piano	
Instrumental	1926	Theme and variations	Solo piano	
Choral	1927	Mass in A minor	SSATB choir	"written under the guidance" of Vaughan Williams
Instrumental	1927	Suite in F: "Allegro assai"	Strings	
Orchestral	1927	Suite: "Moderato"	Small orchestra	
Chamber	1928	Quintet	Oboe and strings	
Instrumental	1928	Sonata in G	Violin and Piano	
Chamber	1928	Phantasy	String quartet	
Chamber	1928	Suite	Flute, oboe, clarinet, bassoon	
Orchestral	1929	Overture: Persephone	Orchestra	
Brass band	1929	Suite: The Unfortunate Traveller	Brass band	
Instrumental	1930	Suite: The Unfortunate Traveller	Strings	Arrangement of brass band suite (1929)
Choral	1930	"What Man is He"	SATB chorus and orchestra	Text from Wisdom IX: 13–17
Ballet	1930	Meddling in Magic	Orchestra	
Instrumental	1930	Suite	Unaccompanied viola	
Chamber	1930	Sonata	Violin and cello	
Orchestral	1932	Morris Suite	Small orchestra	
Instrumental	1934	Five Short Airs on a Ground	Pipes	
Instrumental	1934	Five Short Pieces	Solo piano	
Instrumental	1934	Six Pictures from Finland	Solo piano	
Choral	1934	Wedding Hymn: "Father in Thine Almighty Hand" (words: Eleanor Spensley)	SATB voices	
Orchestral	1934	Incidental music: The Song of Solomon	Orchestra	Music for a Hollywood pageant
Concertante	1935	Concerto for violin and string orchestra	Solo violin and strings	Based on traditional Irish tunes
Instrumental	1935	Four Easy Pieces	Viola and piano	
Orchestral	1935	On Westhall Hill	Small orchestra	
Choral	1935	Carol: "My Bairn, Sleep Softly Now" (Anon.)	Unaccompanied female voices (SSSAA) or solo soprano and pipes	
Instrumental	1936	Canons	Treble pipes	
Vocal	1936	"Fly Away Over the Sea" (words: Christina Rossetti)	Two sopranos and piano	
Vocal	1936	Canon: "Great Art Thou, O Lord"	Five unaccompanied equal voices	
Vocal	1936	"Lady Daffadowndilly" (words: Christina Rossetti)	Treble voices and piano	
Choral	1936	"Now Will I Weave White Violets" (words: Meleager of Gadara)	Female voices (SSA)	
Choral	1937	Incidental music: Nicodemus	Chorus and orchestra	
Instrumental	1937	12 Songs for Children (piano accompaniments)	Piano	
Vocal	1937	"Little Thinkest Thou, Poore Flower" (words: John Donne)	Voice and piano	
Instrumental	1939	"Prelude and Dance"	Piano	
Orchestral	1939	Eothen Suite	Small orchestra	
Choral	1940	"The Cherry Tree Carol"	Unaccompanied SATB voices	
Instrumental	1940	Six Shakespeare songs	Three recorders	
Choral	1940	"A Hymne to Christ" (words: John Donne)	SATB chorus	
Chamber	1941	Offley Suite	Recorder trio	
Instrumental	1941	Deddington Suite	Recorder trio	
Chamber	1942	Serenade	Flute, viola and bassoon	
Instrumental	1943	Suite	String orchestra	
Choral	1943	Three Psalms	SSAATB chorus and strings	
Instrumental	1943	Theme and variations	Solo violin	
Concertante	1944	Oboe concerto	Oboe and orchestra	
Chamber	1944	First String Trio	Violin, viola, cello	
Choral	1944	Five songs (words: Anon., Robert Herrick, John Donne	SSSAA voices	
Vocal	1944	Four Songs (words: Tottel's Miscellany)	Soprano and piano	
Choral	1945	Hierusalem (words: Tottel's Miscellany )	Eight-part female chorus	
Opera	1945	Young Beichan (libretto: Beryl de Zoete)	Soloists, chorus and orchestra	Puppet opera in seven scenes
Instrumental	1945	Offley Suite	Strings	Arrangement for elementary string classes
Instrumental	1946	Duet for treble recorders	Two treble recorders	
Instrumental	1946	Six Canons	Violins	Exercises for violin classes
Choral	1946	Anthem: "How Manifold are thy Works"	Unspecified chorus	
Choral	1946	Four Canons for Winsome	Female voices	For Winsome Bartlett, a colleague of IH at Dartington
Chamber	1946	String Quartet No. 1	String quartet	
Choral	1947	Birthday Canon for Winsome: "Open me the gates of righteousness"	SATB voices	
Choral	1947	Birthday Part-Song for Winsome: "The lopped tree in time may grow again"	SSSAA voices	
Vocal	1948	Round: "I stand as still as any stone"	Four voices (unspecified)	
Chamber	1949	String quartet No. 2	String quartet	
Vocal	1950	Incidental music, Prometheus (words: Aeschylus)	Voices (unspecified) and viola accompaniment	
Choral	1950	Six part-songs: Welcome Joy and Welcome Sorrow	SSA voices and harp (or piano)	Settings of Keats
Opera	1951	Benedick and Beatrice	Soloists, chorus and orchestra	One-act opera based on Shakespeare's characters
Choral	1955	Motet: "Lavabo inter innocentes"	SSSAA voices	
Instrumental	1962	The Fall of the Leaf: three short studies on a 16th-century tune	Solo cello	
Choral	1962	"The Twelve Kindly Months" (words: Thomas Tusser)	SSA voices	
Instrumental	1962	Variations on "Loth to Depart"	String quartet and two string orchestras	
Instrumental	1962	String Trio No. 2	Violin, viola and cello	
Choral	1964	"As Laurel Leaves That Cease Not to Be Green" (from Tottel's Miscellany)	SSA voices	
Choral	1964	"That Lord that Lay in Asse Stall"	SATB voices	
Choral	1965	Carol: "Make Ye Merry For Him That Is To Come"	SSATB voices	
Choral	1965	"Not Unto Us O Lord"	Two treble and alto choirs, organ, optional tubular bells	
Choral	1965	Cantata: The Sun's Journey	Soprano and alto choirs, small orchestra (or piano)	
Orchestral	1965	Triannon Suite	Orchestra	
Instrumental	1966	Fanfare for the Grenadier Guards	Three trumpets, horn, two trombones	
Instrumental	1966	Fanfare for Thaxted	Two trumpets, flute, bells	
Instrumental	1967	Leiston Suite	Brass quartet	
Instrumental	1968	Duo	Viola and piano	
Choral	1968	"Out of Your Sleep arise and Wake"	unaccompanied SSATTB chorus	based on an anonymous fifteenth-century carol
Instrumental	1969	Badingham Chime	Handbells	
Brass Band	1969	Theme and seven variations: The Glory of the West	Brass band	
Orchestral	1969	Woodbridge Suite	Orchestra	
Instrumental	1970	Fantasia on Hampshire Folk Tunes	String orchestra	
Instrumental	1972	Iken Fanfare	School wind band	
Choral	1972	"Hallo My Fancy, Whither Wilt Thou Go" (words: William Cleland)	SSTBB and counter-tenor	
Vocal	1974	"Farewell to Rod"	Solo voice and continuo	
Concertante	1976	Joyce's Divertimento	Viola and orchestra	
Orchestral	1977	Deben Calendar	Orchestra	
Instrumental	1980	February Welcome	Handbells	
Vocal	1980	A Greeting	Two sopranos, mezzo-soprano and piano	
Vocal	1982	"Song for a Well-Loved Librarian"	Soprano, mezzo-soprano, tenor and baritone	Dedicated to Fred Ferry, librarian to the Britten-Pears Library
Chamber	1982	String Quintet	String quintet: two violins, viola, two cellos	
Vocal	1984	Homage to William Morris	Bass voice and string bass	
Instrumental	1984	Recorder sextet	Sopranino, two descants, two trebles and tenor recorders	
Instrumental	1984	Concerto for recorder and string orchestra	Solo recorder and string orchestra	
Instrumental	1984	Duet	Violin and cello	

=== Table 2: Arrangements ===
Genre	Year	Title	Forces (instrumental and vocal)	Notes
Instrumental	1932	First Book of Tunes for the Pipes	Pipes	Collected and arranged
Instrumental	1933	Selected 18th Century Dances	Piano	Collected and arranged
Instrumental	1933	Second Book of Tunes for the Pipes	Pipes	Collected and arranged
Instrumental	1933	Two Scottish Airs	Cello and piano	
Vocal	1934	Four Oxfordshire Folk Songs	Two sopranos and piano	
Vocal	1934	Four Somerset Folk Songs	Two sopranos and alto	
Orchestral	1934	Love in a Mist or The Blue-Haired Stranger	Orchestra	Arranged from music by Scarlatti
Choral	1934	Folk song: "Nowell and Nowell"	Mixed voices	
Vocal	1934	Six Scottish Folk Songs	Voice, pipes piano	
Orchestral	1934	Traditional Country Dances	Orchestra	Arranged for the Cecil Sharp House Orchestra and others
Instrumental	1935	Four Folk Tunes from Hampshire	Unison violins and piano	
Orchestral	1935	"Intermezzo" from Gustav Holst's First Suite in E flat	Orchestra	Orchestral arrangement
Choral	1935	Folk song: "The Virgin Unspotted"	Unaccompanied female voices (SSA)	
Instrumental	1936	Twelve Old English Dance Airs	Pipes	Arrangements, from Playford's English Dancing Master
Choral	1936	"Wassail Song"	Unaccompanied men's chorus	Arranged from Gustav Holst's setting for mixed voices
Instrumental	1937	Six Old English Dances	Piano	Arrangements, from Playford's English Dancing Master
Choral	1937	Folk song: "A Sweet Country Life"	Unaccompanied SATB voices	
Choral	1937	Folk song from Hampshire: "The Cobbler"	Unaccompanied SATB voices	
Choral	1937	"A Cornish Wassail Song"	Unaccompanied SATB voices	
Brass band	1937	Coronation Country Dances	Brass band	Co-arrangement with Gordon Jacob
Instrumental	1937	The Rival Sisters	Strings, ad lib woodwind and percussion	Arrangements of Purcell's suite for small orchestra
Vocal	1938	Pelham Humphrey: Three Songs (Pelham Humphrey)	Voice and piano	
Vocal	1938	Ten Appalachian Folk Songs	Voice and piano	
Choral	1940	Six Traditional Carols (first set)	SSA voices	Completed between 1940 and 1946
Vocal	1940	Pastoral scene: Nymphs and Shepherds	SSA voices, strings, optional recorders	Based on music by Purcell
Choral	1940	Dorset folk carol: "Come All You Worthy People"	SSA voices	
Instrumental	1940	Pelham Humphrey: Five airs	Recorder trio	
Vocal	1941	Pelham Humphrey: Song "Nature's Homily"	Baritone and piano	
Instrumental	1942	Handel's "As When the Dove"	Continuo	
Instrumental	1942	A Bach Book for the Treble Recorder	Treble recorder	Selected and edited by IH
Vocal	1942	Three Carols from Other Lands	Unspecified	
Choral	1943	"Of a Rosemary Branch Sent"	SATB voices with strings	
Choral	1943	Shropshire folk carol: "All Under the Leaves"	SSA voices	Also known as "The Seven Virgins"
Choral	1943	Cornish folk-carol: "Cherry, Holly and Ivy"	SATB voices	
Choral	1945	Bach's Cantata No. 79: "God the Lord is Son and Shield"	SSA voices	
Instrumental	1945	Purcell's The Tempest	Piano, flute, descant recorder, oboe, clarinet, strings	
Orchestral	1945	Three Somerset Folk Songs	Small orchestra	
Instrumental	1947	British Folk Songs	Solo piano	
Choral	1948	Six Traditional Carols (Second set)	SSA voices	
Choral	1949	Gustav Holst: "Lullay my Liking"	SSA voices with solo soprano	
Choral	1949	Six Christmas Carols (Third set)	SSA and SSAA voices	
Instrumental	1950	Purcell: Four songs	Recorder ensemble	
Choral	1950	"Greensleeves"	SSA voices	
Instrumental	1950	Purcell: Seventeen songs	Piano, two violins, cello ad lib	
Choral	1950	Folk song: "I Must Live All Alone"	SSA voices	
Instrumental	1951	Ten Indian Folk Tunes from the Punjab	Descant recorder	Transcribed by IH and Prabhakar Chinchore
Choral	1952	Handel: L'Allegro, il Penseroso ed il Moderato	Equal voices with ad lib soprano and alto soli	
Instrumental	1952	"Sellenger's Round"	Strings	Arrangement of Byrd setting
Vocal	1953	Daniel Purcell: "By What I've Seen I am Undone"	Voice and piano	
Vocal	1953	Henry Carey: Four Songs	Voice and piano	
Orchestral	1954	Britten: "March from the Courtly Dances sequence in Gloriana	Orchestra	Orchestral arrangement
Vocal	1954	Britten: Second Lute Song of Earl of Essex, from Gloriana	Voice and piano	
Choral	1955	Britten: Choral Dances from Gloriana	Tenor solo and SATB chorus	
Instrumental	1955	Bach: A Christmas Canon	Recorder quartet	
Vocal	1955	Handel: "For Ever Blessed Be Thy Holy Name"	Voice and piano	
Choral	1955	Folk song: "O Can Ye Sew Cushions"	SSA voices and piano	From Britten's Folk Song arrangements Vol. 1
Choral	1955	Six Scottish Songs	SSA voices unaccompanied	
Choral	1955	Traditional Songs of Scotland	SSA voices unaccompanied	
Vocal	1955	Arne: "Under the Greenwood Tree"	Voice and piano	
Vocal	1956	Sea shanty: "Sally Brown"	Voices and recorders	
Opera	1956	Venus and Adonis	Unspecified	From the original by John Blow: prepared for the 1956 Aldeburgh Festival
Choral	1957	"Singing for Pleasure"	Female voices	Song collection
Choral	1958	Six Traditional Carols (Fourth Set)	Unaccompanied SSA and SSSA voices	
Choral	1959	"A Jubilee Book of English Folk Songs"	Unison voices and piano	Song collection
Choral	1959	Ten songs from John Wilson's Cheerfull Ayres and Ballads (1659)	SSA voices	
Instrumental	1960	Fifty Bach tunes	Recorder	Arranged from originals
Instrumental	1960	Ten Bach tunes	Recorder	Arranged from originals
Choral	1960	A Yacre of Land: 16 folksongs from collection of Ralph Vaughan Williams	Unison voices and piano, or unaccompanied voices	Co-arranged by IH and Ursula Vaughan Williams
Vocal	1961	Nineteen Songs from Folk Songs of Europe, ed. Maud Karpeles	Voice and piano accompaniment	
Choral	1961	Tunes from Kentucky	Equal voices and junior orchestra	
Choral	1962	Heinrich Schütz: The Passion According to St John	Soloists and unaccompanied chorus	Co-edited and arranged by IH and Peter Pears
Choral	1964	Scottish Traditional Song: "A Wee Bird Cam' to Our Ha'Door"	SATB voices	
Choral	1965	The Passion According to St Luke	Unaccompanied voices	Edited and arranged for performance from 15thC manuscripts
Choral	1965	Heinrich Schütz: The Passion According to St Matthew	Soloists and unaccompanied chorus	Co-edited and translated by IH and Peter Pears
Vocal	1966	Thomas Tudway: "I Will Lift Up Mine Eyes"	Soprano and continuo	
Choral	1966	George Kirbye: "O Jesu, Look"	SSATB voices	
Opera	1967	Purcell: The Faerie Queen (shortened version)	Soloists, chorus and orchestra	Edited and prepared for concert performance by IH, Peter Pears and Benjamin Britten
Choral	1967	Bach: The Passion According to St John	Soloists, chorus and orchestra	Edited by Benjamin Britten and IH; English translation by Peter Pears
Orchestral	1967	Lully: Suite from Persée	Orchestra	Edited from original by IH and Emanuel Hurwitz
Vocal	1967	Three Carol Arrangements	Three equal unaccompanied voices	
Vocal	1967	Twenty Traditional British Folk Songs	unaccompanied voices in part song	
Choral	1968	Purcell: Wedding anthem, "How Blest Are They"	Mixed voices, soprano and bass soli	Arranged by IH and Philip Ledger
Choral	1969	Purcell: "Remember Not, O Lord"	Male chorus	
Instrumental	1970	William Byrd: "Browning"	Violin, two violas, two cellos	
Choral	1970	English folk song: "Gypsy Davy"	Unaccompanied chorus	Arranged as a ballad
Vocal	1978	Pelham Humphrey and John Blow: "A Dialogue Between Two Penitents"	Two tenors and continuo	
Instrumental	1981	Seventeenth-century traditional English dance: "About Ship"	Piano duet	
Instrumental	1983	Seven tunes by Gustav Holst	piano	Arrangement for elementary piano
