= Armband =

Piece of material worn around the arm

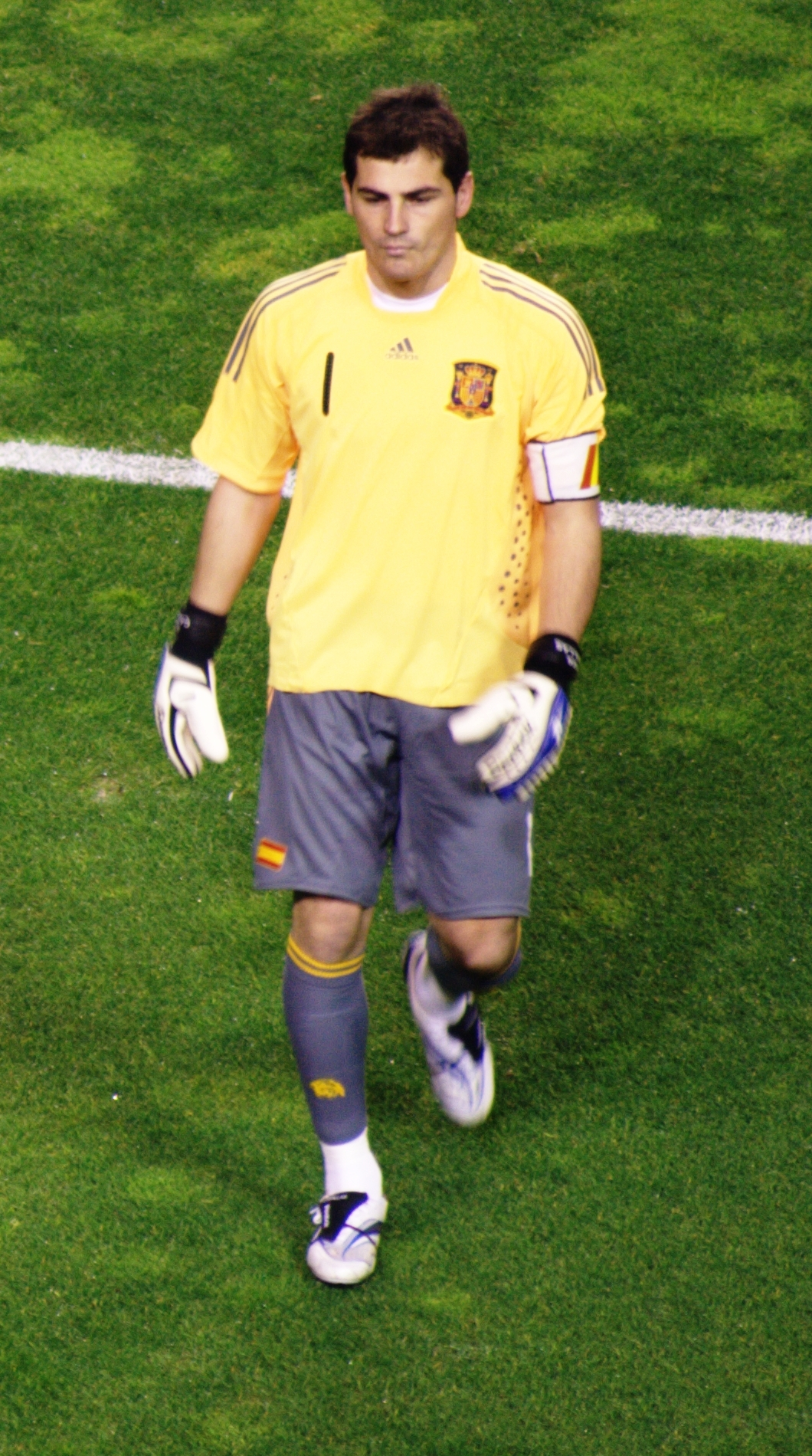
Spanish footballer Iker Casillas wearing a captain's armband for the Spanish national team.

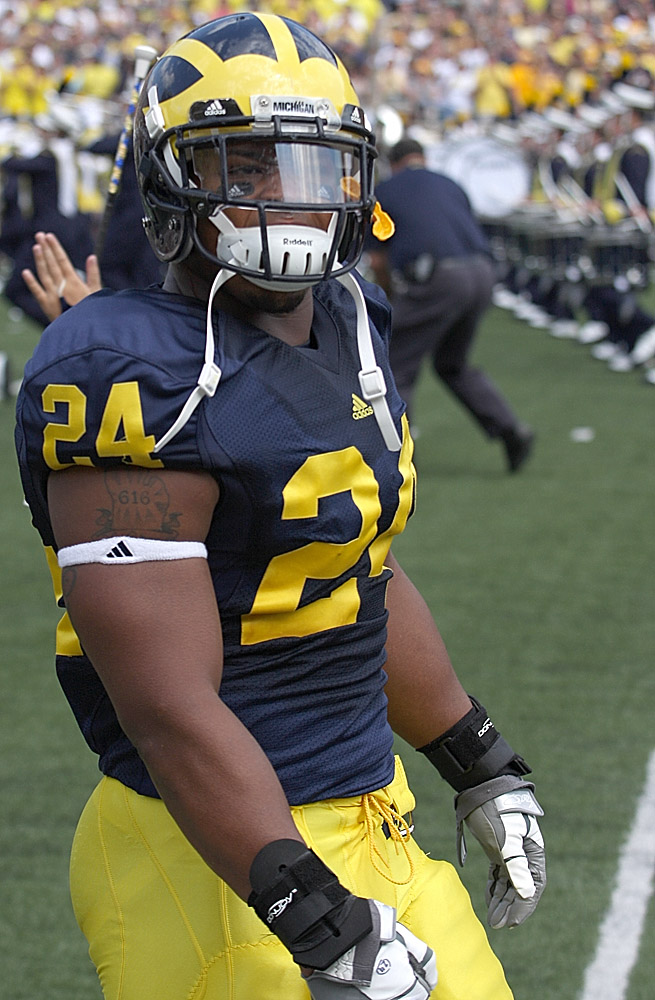
American football player Kevin Grady wearing an armband that displays the Adidas corporate logo.

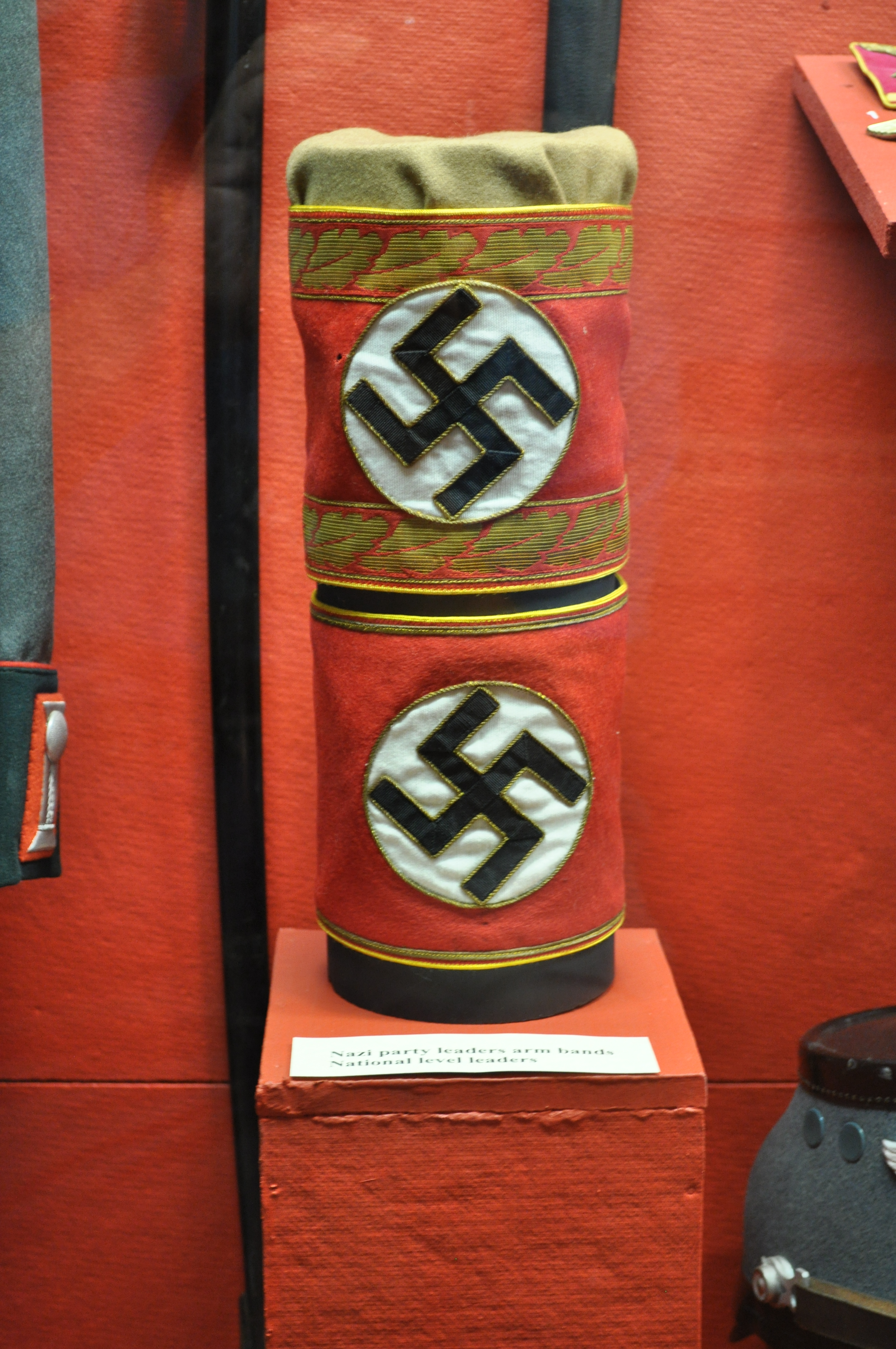
Uniforms associated with the Nazi Party and Third Reich frequently included armbands.

An armband is a piece of material worn around the arm. They may be worn for pure ornamentation, or to mark the wearer as belonging to group, or as insignia having a certain rank, status, office or role, or being in a particular state or condition. Sprung armbands, known as sleeve garters, have been used by men to keep overlong sleeves from dropping over the hands and thereby interfering with their use. Armbands may also refer to inflatable armbands used to assist flotation for swimmers or for use with sphygmomanometers, in which case they are generally referred to as cuffs.

== Variation ==
When used as part of a military uniform it is called a brassard. Uniforms serving other purposes such as to identify members of clubs, societies or teams may also have armbands for certain ranks or functions. An armband might identify a group leader, a team captain, or a person charged with controlling or organizing an event.

Police departments in Asia use armbands for a "traffic reflection armband" or marking a type of unit.

Journalists in Asia use an armband to mark themselves, similar to a press badge.

Armbands are sometimes used to indicate political affiliations or to identify the wearer with an ideology or social movement.

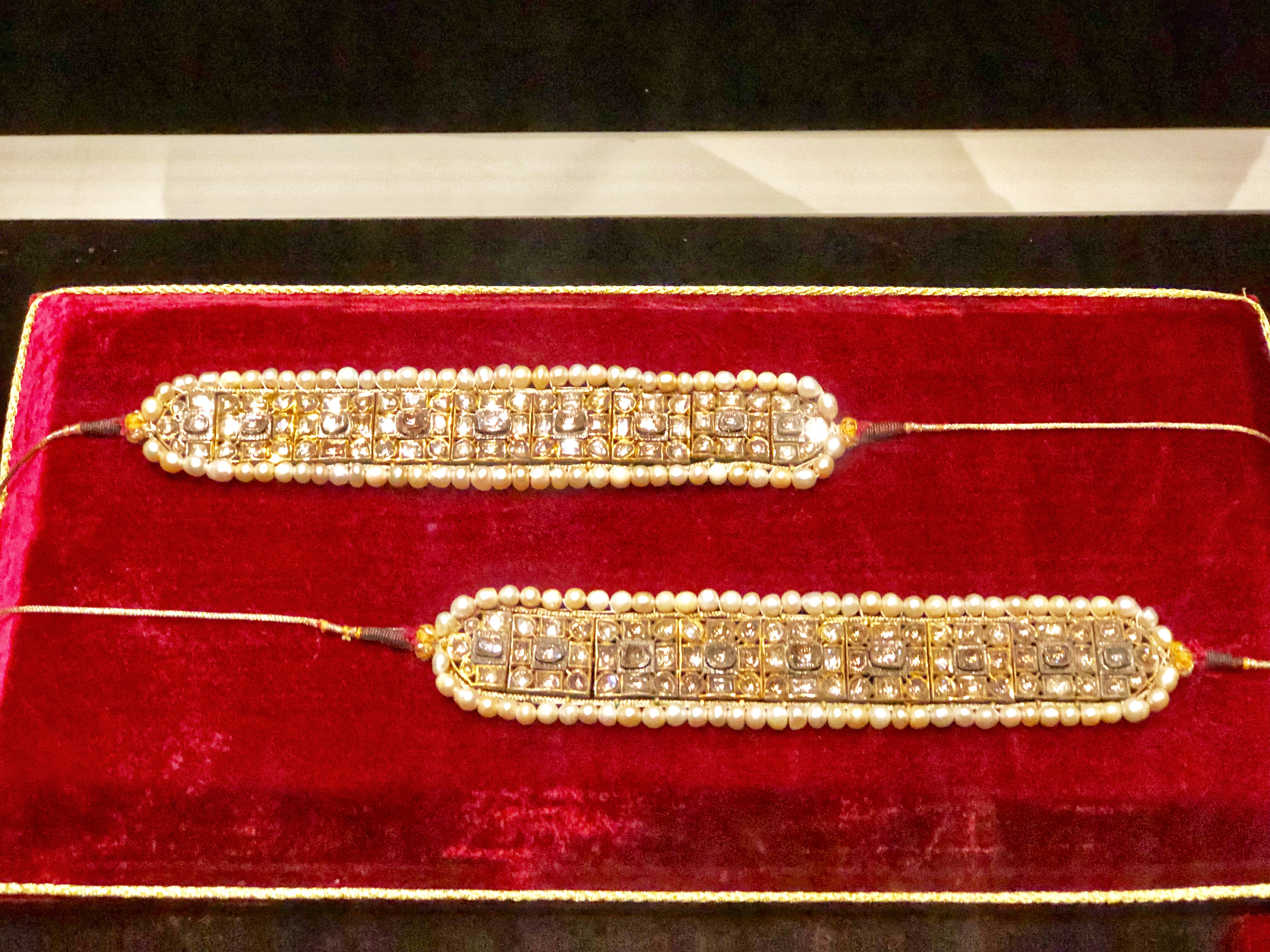
Made for the nizams of Hyderabad

Large corporations sponsor athletes and teams in an effort to get advertising when the athletes exhibit the corporate logo visibly. Armbands, headbands, handbands and wristbands are common forms of such advertising.

The phrase to wear your heart on your sleeve, meaning to show your feelings, to display an emotional affiliation or conviction, is supposedly related to armbands. In medieval jousts, ladies of the court were said to tie a piece of cloth — a scarf or kerchief — around the arm of their favorite knight, who thus displayed his affection for the lady.

Armbands are often used to hold a smartphone or a portable music player on a wearer's arm while doing activities such as lifting weights, running, etc. A hybrid type of armband and handband combination is now also widely used by runners.

Even armbands can be used for giving identity to someone and who they are part of their tribe. Indigenous people used armbands for that reason and they used Metals, raw hides, leather, and beads to create the uniqueness of armbands.

== Mourning ==
In some cultures, a black armband signifies that the wearer is in mourning or wishes to identify with the commemoration of a family member, friend, comrade or team member who has died. This use is particularly common in the first meeting following the loss of a member. President Franklin D. Roosevelt wore a black armband mourning the recent death of his mother at the time he signed the declaration of war against Japan in December 1941. In association football, it is common for a team to wear black armbands in their next match after the death of a former player or manager. This may also be accompanied by a moment of silence at the start of the match.

The phrase "black armband view of history" was introduced to the Australian political lexicon by conservative historian Geoffrey Blainey in 1993 to describe views of history which, he believed, posited that "much of Australian history had been a disgrace" and which focused mainly on the treatment of minority groups, especially Aboriginal Australians. The term was used by Prime Minister John Howard, whose perspective on Australian history strongly contrasted with what he called the black armband view.

== Identity ==
Armbands were used by indigenous people of America with more various designs from each different tribe. The different tribes that used armbands each have different materials and designs for each armband. The materials that the indigenous people used was Metal, Rawhides, leather, and beads. Many tribes like the Ute tribe, Algonquian tribes, Chippewa, Southeastern tribes, Northeastern tribes, Great Basin area tribes, Southwest tribes, Plateau tribe mostly common about their armbands. They use Floral or Geometrical designs on their armbands to give significance for their identity as themselves and part of their tribe.

In cultures that used armbands for significance for identity as an individual and who they are in their tribe. Indigenous people use armbands for that exact reason, the armbands have designs to create the unique designs for their own identity. Beads are often used to create that uniqueness in designs. Beads that are mostly commonly used for designs but they show a story of who that indigenous person is.

Beads were used to make the designs unique. They got beads from trading with the settlers from the 1800s, many of the beads come in different colors and also they were commonly used as glass. They did different designs like floral from spot stitching and geometrical from lazy stitching.

Raw hides were also commonly used materials to make armbands because they are very comfortable to wear and they are easy to find in their area that they lived in. The indigenous people get their raw hide from deer, buffalo, cows, and goats.

== Types ==
- Arm ring
- Brassard, or armlet, a piece of military uniform
- Inflatable armbands, flotation devices
- Pra Jiad
- Sleeve garter
- Tefillin
