= Masuccio Salernitano =

Italian writer (1410–1475)

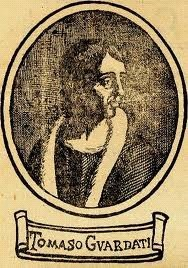
Masuccio Salernitano (Tommaso Guardati).

Masuccio Salernitano (1410–1475), born Tommaso Guardati, was an Italian poet.

Born in Salerno or Sorrento, he is best known today for Il Novellino, a collection of 50 "novelle" or short stories, each prefaced by a letter of dedication to a famous person and with an epilogue containing the "moral" of the story.

The stories have a strongly anti-clerical bent, which caused Il Novellino to be included in the first Index of Prohibited Books in 1557.

The 33rd of these stories is the story of Mariotto and Ganozza, which was apparently adapted by Luigi da Porto (1485–1529) first as Giulietta e Romeo and later as Historia novellamente ritrovata di due nobili amanti ("Newly retrieved story of two noble lovers"). These three stories, plus another later version by Matteo Bandello and the English translation by Arthur Brooke in the poem Tragicall Historye of Romeus and Juliet (1562) appear to be the sources for Shakespeare's famous play Romeo and Juliet.
