= Colt's Hall, Cavendish =

Manor house in Suffolk, England

Coordinates: 52°05′54″N 0°37′00″E

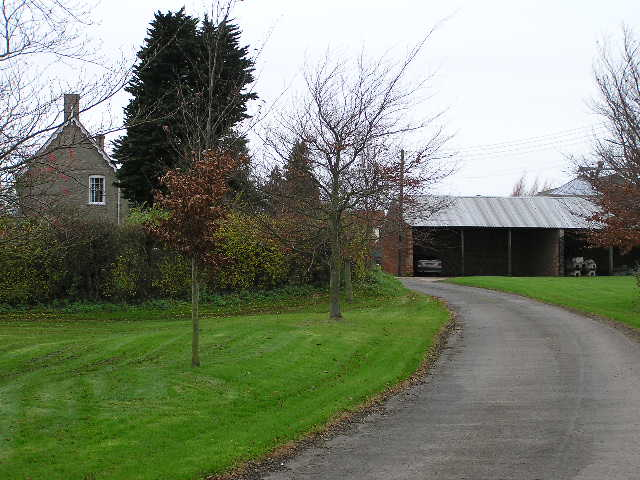
Image of Colts Hall

Colt's Hall is an old manor house in Cavendish, Suffolk, England. It is a Grade II listed building.

== Queen Elizabeth's visit ==
In this house George Colt entertained Queen Elizabeth I during her progress of 1578. Colt provided dinner, and Elizabeth used the occasion to knight George Colt before proceeding to Melford Hall, where she stayed overnight.

== William Kempe's visit ==
William Kempe stayed at Colt's Hall in 1600 during his "Nine Days Wonder", in which he morris danced from London to Norwich.
