= Progress of 1578 =

Elizabethan royal tour of East Anglia

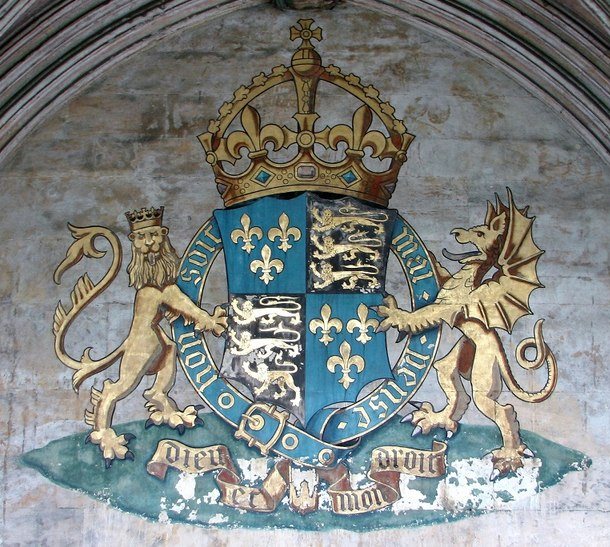
The coat of arms of Elizabeth I in the cloisters of Norwich Cathedral

The Progress of 1578 was an extensive royal tour of East Anglia, England by Queen Elizabeth I, which took place in from 31 July to 30 August 1578. The Queen and her court went from London to Norwich, stopping at several estates in Norfolk and Suffolk on the way and arriving in Norwich on 16 August. Here, she watched several pageants organised by Bernard Garter and Thomas Churchyard and engaged in local political negotiation as well as discussions with French and Spanish ambassadors before setting off home on 24 August. The 1578 progress is the only extensive royal tour of the region. It is Elizabeth's only visit to Norwich, her furthest progress from London, and one of the best-recorded Elizabethan progresses.

== Background ==
East Anglia was unstable at the time of the Queen's progress, and Norfolk was known for being rebellious at this time; memory of Kett's Rebellion in 1549, an agrarian uprising in response to the enclosure of common land, was a part of the national consciousness. Mary Tudor's 1553 coup d'etat had been mounted from Suffolk, and the execution of Duke of Norfolk Thomas Howard took place six years prior to the progress, following the conspiracy to assassinate Elizabeth known as the Ridolfi plot and the subsequent Northern Rebellion of 1569 in which citizens of Norfolk participated. The execution had created a power vacuum.

By the time of Elizabeth's visit to Norwich, it had become the second largest and second wealthiest city in England. The Dutch community in this city, known as the Strangers, was one of the most substantial communities of this group in England, and nearly a third of the 16,000 residents of Norwich were Protestant immigrants from the Low Countries. An uprising against these religious refugees had occurred in 1570, though tensions had eased by the mid-1570s and civic leaders were praising this population for their industry, contributions, and obedience. However, in Spring 1578, Queen Elizabeth had backed away from her direct support for the Protestant Dutch and William of Orange. Additionally, there had been a decline in trade and industry, an increase in poverty, and threats of foreign invasion.

== Preparations ==
It is debatable as to who decided to begin a progress to East Anglia in 1578 and who drew up the queen's exact itinerary for the progress; it may have been Elizabeth herself, Lord Chamberlain, or another. Evidence is not consistent as to who of the interested parties knew of the plans and when; in May 1578, Gilbert Talbot told his father, the then Earl of Shrewsbury, that "It is thought her Majesty will go in progress to Norfolk this year, but there is no certain determination thereof as yet." The Earl of Leicester remarked on 18 June that his friend Lord North had no time "to furnish his house according to his duty and honourable good will." Though Norwich was notified of the visit in June, Thomas Churchyard was of the belief that Norfolk and Suffolk had been given "but small warning". In mid-July, Lord Keeper Sir Nicholas Bacon as unsure whether the Queen would get as far as Suffolk, and on 20 July, Norfolk gentleman Sir Christopher Heydon wrote in a letter to Bacon's son Nathaniel may not be coming as far as Norwich, "if the bird sing truly that I heard this day". On 21 July, the Earl of Northumberland asked William Cecil about "the certainty of Her Majesty's progress". Patrick Collinson has argued that the decision to go to Norwich through Suffolk was taken by a dominant group in the Privy Council and possibly Earl of Leicester Robert Dudley who had interests in this area.

Dustin M Neighbors has argued that the visit to Norwich was an attempt by the Queen solely "to demand the public’s obedience and rebuke religious non-conformists."

=== Plans in Norwich ===
Two men were hired separately by the city to create entertainment for the Queen. Churchyard, hired first, arrived in Norwich on 25 July 1578. His work was largely focused around stage management and choreography. Bernard Garter stepped in later to compose further entertainments, mostly consisting of orations and speeches.

The City Assembly had a meeting on 25 July at which it decided to allocate four or five hundred pounds, at the time equivalent to at least 10,000 days' wages for a skilled tradesman, "for the Setting forth of Shewes at the Quenes majesties comyng". It is unclear whether the city was able to raise this money.

It was planned for the Queen's arrival in this city on 16 August that she would meet "one which represented king Gurgunt, sometime king of England", at the Town Close. It was to be falsely claimed that Gurgunt was a former King of England who had founded Norwich. The character of Gurgunt was claim to have built Norwich Castle, and to point out parallels between himself and Elizabeth, such as that they both had grandfathers who ended civil wars, had fathers who were enemies to Rome – Gurgunt's father was "King Belin" – and had founded schools at Cambridge. Gurgunt would have spoken of the sacking of Rome by an ancient English army. The actor playing Gurgunt was to wear a costume of armour with green and white silk bases, and a black velvet hat with green and white feathers, as these were the family colours of the Tudors as well as the personal colours of the Queen. This speech in particular would not come to pass.

Aside from this, Norwich's Protestant and pro-Dutch mayor Robert Wood prepared two orations for the visit. The Dutch congregation erected a monument, and its minister Hermanus Modert prepared one lengthy oration in Latin. Norwich schoolmaster Stephen Limbert prepared two orations.

== Progress to Norwich ==
The Progress took place between 11 July and 30 August 1578, in the 20th year of Elizabeth I's reign. It would be one of the Queen's longest processions, and it would take her the farthest from London. It would additionally be the only extensive royal tour of East Anglia, Elizabeth's only visit to Norwich during her reign, and one of the best recorded Elizabethan progresses.

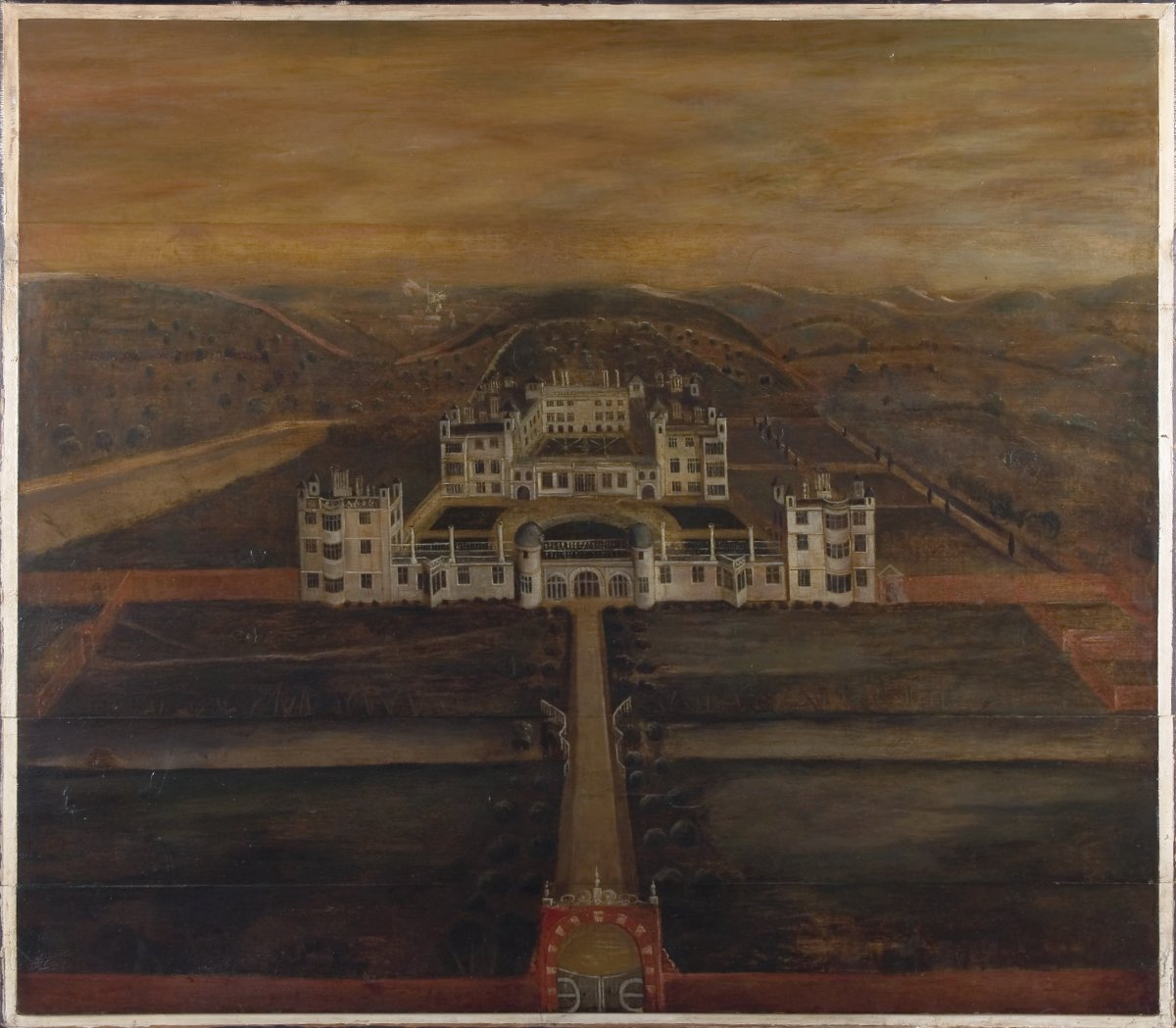
Audley End House, a stop on the Progress (pictured c. 1710)

The procession began on 11 July with Elizabeth leaving Greenwich for the royal palace at Havering, and then visiting the house of the Earl of Leicester in Wanstead. She was hosted by James Altam at Mark Hall, Latton, and Sir Raphe Sadler at Standon. At Audley End, where the Queen was hosted by Sir Thomas Howard, the University of Cambridge prepared presentations for Elizabeth, with vice-chancellor Richard Howland presenting her with a copy of the New Testament in Greek, a pair of gloves, and Latin verses celebrating her as an "innuba Virgo" who was "prudens" (prudent) and "casta" (chaste). A French delegation joined the progress at Audley End.

The Queen began proceeding through various towns in Suffolk. She was hosted by Thomas Barnardiston of Kedington, Sir William Cordell of Melford Hall, Thomas Badby at Bury St Edmunds, and Edward Rookwood at Euston. During her progress through Suffolk, the Sheriff of Suffolk mustered 2,000 escorts to accompany her.

Norfolk authorities had Elizabeth be accompanied by 2,500 horsemen. On 12 August, the Queen proceeded into Norfolk and stopped at Kenninghall estate, hosted by Earl of Surrey Philip Howard. On 16 August, she arrived at the Bracon Ash estate Mergate Hall, hosted by Thomas Townsend.

== Norwich ==
The travelling show reached Norwich, then seen as the second city of the Kingdom, and stayed there from 16 to 22 August.

=== 16 August: Welcomes and pageants ===
On Saturday 16 August at 1pm, Elizabeth reached Hartford Bridge near Norwich and there met its mayor Robert Wood, its other assemblymen and aldermen, Wood gave an extensive oration in Latin, He was thanked "hartily" by the Queen. The individual playing Gurgunt was expected to give their speech after this. However, it is recorded that "by reason of a showre of raine which came, hir Majestie hasted away, [and] the speech [was] not uttered". This was the only performer left disappointed.

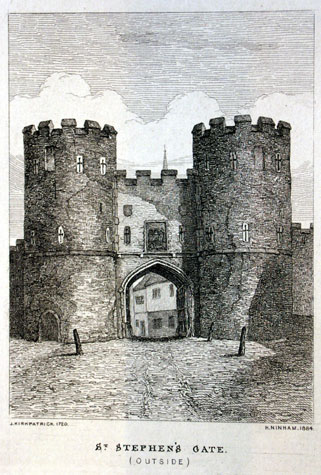
The Queen sheltered from the rain and entered Norwich through St Stephen's Gate (pictured 1720).

The Queen then came to St Stephen's Gate under which she would shelter from the rain accompanied by entertainment from the Waites of the City. The gate featured the Queen's coat of arms, as well as on its walls the red rose of the House of Lancaster and the white rose of the House of York. Garter later wrote that,

The Queenes Armes were moste richely and beautifully set forth in the chiefe front of the gate, on the oneside thereof [...] on the other side, the armes of the Cittie: and directlye vnder the Queenes Maiesties armes was placed ye Falcon, hir hyghnesse Badge in due forme, & vnder the same were written these words, God and the Queen we serue.

Prior to entering the city she was greeted by the "Dutch congregation", and a Stranger minister made a speech to her in Latin. The Mayor's welcome took place at the gate. She then entered the city. Spanish ambassador Mendoza, who referred to Norwich as 'the North'. wrote to the King of Spain of Elizabeth's knowledge that Norwich was disloyal:

When she entered Norwich large crowds of people came out to receive her, and one company of children knelt as she passed and said, as usual, "God save the Queen." She turned to them and said, "Speak up; I know you do not love me here."

Upon entering the city, the Mayor began speaking to the Queen about religious issues within the city, and confirmed its conformity to the Protestantism. The Queen responded;

We hartily thanke you, Maister Maior, and all the reste, for these tokens of goodwill, neuertheless Princes haue no neede of money: God hathe endowed vs abundantly, we come not therefore, but for that whiche in right is our owne, the heartes and true allegeaunce of our Subiects.

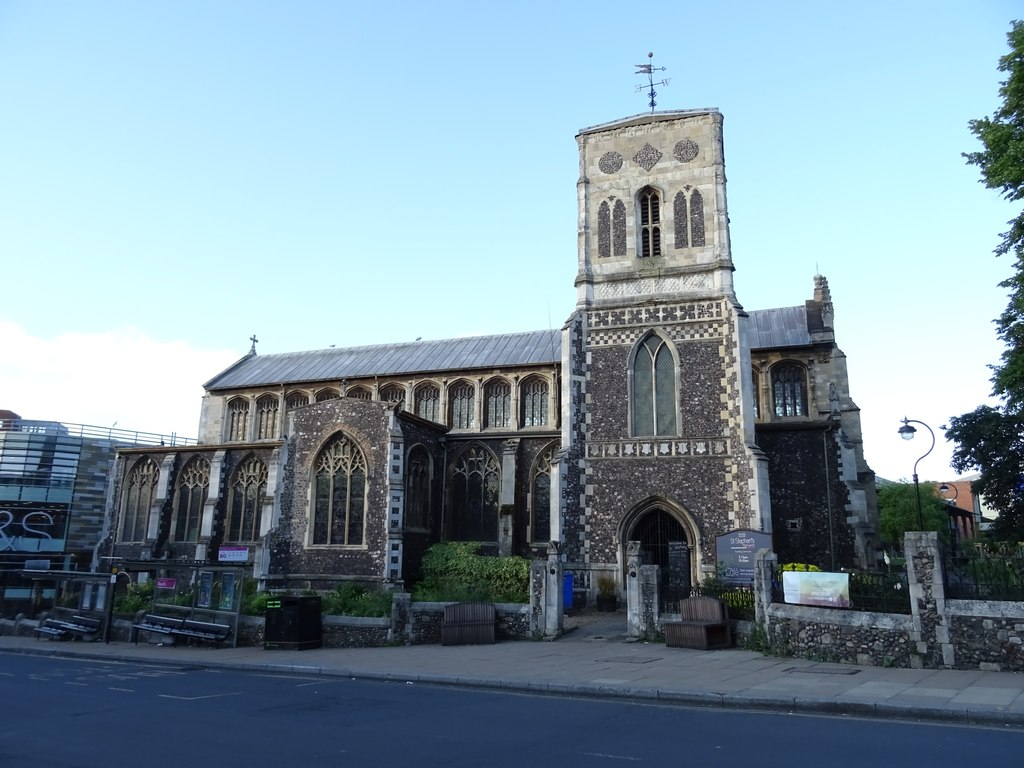
The first pageant of the Queen's visit took place at St Stephen's Church.

The Queen proceeded to St Stephen's Church after the rain cleared for the first pageant at Norwich, overseen by Garter. A large stage had been constructed, above it a sign reading, "The causes of this common wealth are, God truely preached. Justice duely executed. The people obedient. Idlenesse expelled. Labour cherished. Universall concorde preserved." In the pageant, Six men performed by each portraying a cause of the commonwealth as listed on the sign above. There were also 17 child actors, 16 of which were girls; eight of these performed by "spinning Worsted yarne", and the other eight did so by "knitting of Worsted yarne hose", likely actually doing so rather than miming. These likely represented the first generation of children born to the Dutch clothiers that Elizabeth had allowed to settle in the city. One of the children, a boy positioned in the middle of the stage, was dressed in rich apparel to represent "the Common welth of the Citie", and was given the only speaking role as he recounted an oration on the economic future of the city. Elizabeth was impressed with the performance and personally interacted with the actors on stage.

Elizabeth "marched" to another pageant, this time outside the city's marketplace though also organised by Garter. Intended to display the people of Norwich's support for Elizabeth, it featured a stage "replenished with five personages appareled like women. The first was, the City of Norwich: the seconde Debora: the third Judeth: the fourth Esther: the fifthe Martia". The Deborah character, the only female judge to appear in the bible, celebrated Elizabeth's anointed role as Queen by God, whereas the Judith character in particular compared her own defeat of Holofernes to Elizabeth's feud with the Roman Catholics and the Pope.

Following this, in the market itself, outside the house of alderman Mr Peck, was held the first of Churchman's pageants. It featured a "skaffold set up and bravely trimmed", and Churchman writes;

On this Skaffolde, was placed an excellent Boy, wel and gallantly decked, in a long white roabe of Taffata, a Crimson Skarfe wrought with gold, folded on the Turkishe fashion about his browes, and a gay Garlande of fine flouers on his head.

While not immediately noticed by the Queen as she was remarking on the music, this boy made a speech and afterward it was written that he "thereupon flang up his Garlande, and the Queenes Highnesse sayd, This Device is fine". The beginning pageants of her visit also included the exhortation "no Fraude, nor Force, nor foraine Foe may stand Againste the strength of thy moste puyssuant hand." This was an expression of the opposition of the public to her marriage negotiations with the Duke of Alençon.

=== 17–24 August: Delegations, political negotiation and further oration ===
The day after the Court arrived in Norwich, Hermanus Modert delivered his oration, praising her for offering the Dutch refugees sanctuary, for her status as a Protestant queen, and a 'nurse' of the Church, as well as referencing the book of Isaiah and the biblical story of Joseph. Upon hearing that the Dutch and Flemish Strangers had landed in Deal, and had gone to Sandwich to find it a "decayed town", she made the decision in letters patent to "give and graunte lycence to all and every persons strangers [...] to inhabite within our said towne and porte of Sandwich."

On the third day of the visit, Robert Dudley wrote to William Davidson, England's ambassador to William of Orange, noting that the Court was "presently here at Norwich, somwhat nere you, where my thinkes I hear every day the voyce of that people", referring here to the presence of the Dutch community in the city, writing that they disapproved of the Queen's reticence to aid them; "lytle good I imagyn they say, but crye out uppon such neighbours."

On the Wednesday, a French delegation arrived to join the royal party halfway through Elizabeth's week at Norwich, with Garter noting three ambassadors were present that day. These included resident French ambassador Michel de Castelnau, Counsellor of Anjou and Chamberlain in Ordinary Nicholas Martel, and the Sieur de Bacqueville and Monsieur de Quisse, sent by the Catholic Duke of Anjou to press the reopening of marriage negotiations. Henri III had sent Monsieur de Rambouillet.

Stephen Limbert delivered his main oration on the Wednesday in front of the city's hospital nearby his grammar school. He spoke of the history of the hospital, her compassion for the poor that she had learned from reading Plato, and the similarity of her actions to classical figures like Hesiod and Homer, quoting their works in Latin and Greek. After hearing the beginning of Limbert's oration, Elizabeth encouraged the French delegation and her nobles to listen to it again, and closely. He finished the speech with praise for England as unified under her leadership. She is purported that she said to Limbert, "It is the best that euer I heard, you shal haue my hande, and pulled off hir gloue, and gaue him hir hand to kisse."

Also during Elizabeth's time in Norwich, she helped resolve a dispute over fishing rights between the Norfolk seaside towns Great Yarmouth and Little Yarmouth that was impacting Norwich's market. After hearing arguments she and her privy councillors partially restored Great Yarmouth's monopoly on fish sales which the Earl of Richmond had overturned in 1570, but allowed fish caught by boats from Little Yarmouth to be sold in their own town.

On Friday 24 August, the Queen and her court departed Norwich, though just before they did so an unplanned 'device' was performed; Churchyard later wrote that he "resolved to do somewhat [that] might make the Queene laugh". In this device, seven boy actors played water nymphs or fairies, each addressing the Queen with a short speech, and these boys as well as five others played timbrels at the end of the performance.

=== Return journey ===
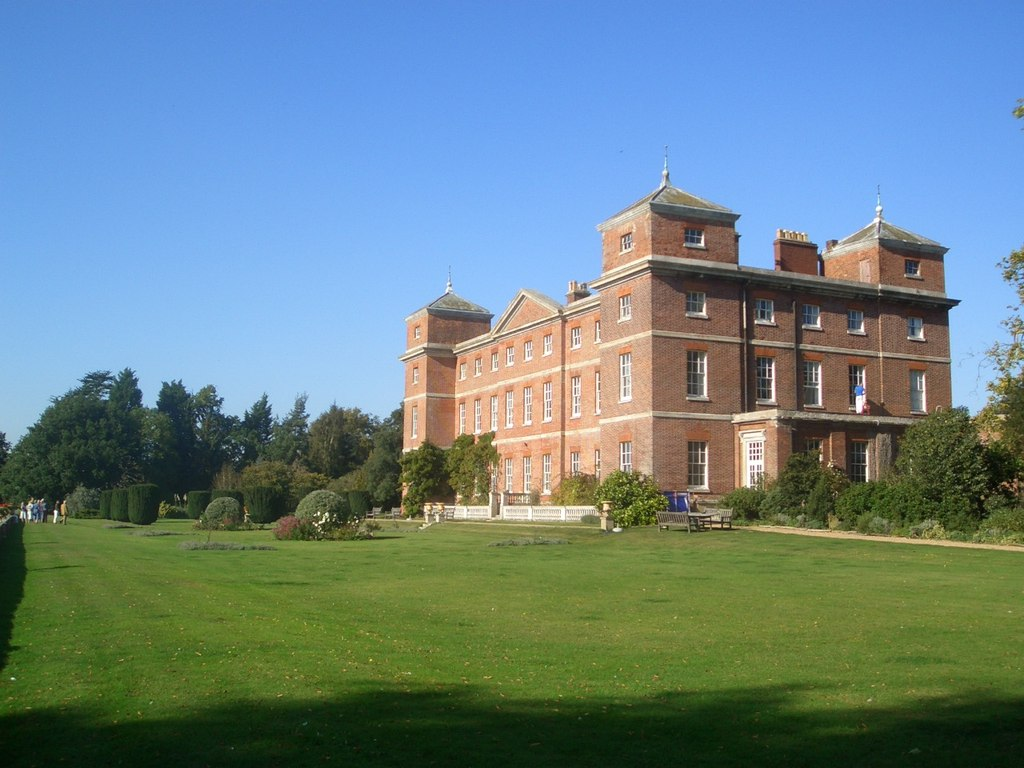
The Queen lodged at Kimberley Hall after leaving Norwich on 24 August 1578

On the way back from Norwich, the Queen and her court went to lodge at Kimberley Hall, hosted by Roger Wodehouse. They then went to meet Sir Robert Southwell at Woodrising, Sir Edward Clere at Thetford, Sir Thomas Kitson at Hengrave Hall, and Thomas Revet at Chippenham; for the latter, John North recounts her stay being on 30 and 31 August. Here, Churchyard noted that "all things were well".

Elizabeth arrived at Kirtling Hall on 1 September and departed on 3 September. Here, her host Sir Roger North had spent large amounts on food with little regard for its cost, with his largest expenditures being on poultry and game with 23 different species of bird on the menu. North gifted a jewel, valued at £120, to Elizabeth.

Following this, she was hosted by Sir Giles Alington at Horseheath Hall, Sir John Cutts at Horham Hall, Henry Capell at Hadham Hall, Henry Heigham at Hyde Hall, Wiston Browne at Rookwood Hall, John Stonar at Luxborough Hall, and the Earl of Leicester at Wanstead.

== Contemporary accounts ==
Thomas Churchyard and Bernard Garter both wrote of the Queen's progress through Norwich, and rushed their accounts of these events to the press soon after their celebration.

Garter's account was published in his work The Ioyfvll Receyuing of the Queenes most excellent Maiestie into her Highnesse Citie of Norwich (1578). This was entered into the Stationers' Register on 30 August, only eight days following the end of the Queen's visit to the city. The account holds all of the Latin texts related to the visit, and portrays Norwich as a microcosm of England's claimed unity, in which "ther semed to be one hart in Queene, Counsaile, and Communalitie." It features multiple speakers and perspectives, and attempts to make the Latin speeches accessible with full English translations.

On 20 September 1578, four weeks after the Queen left Norfolk, Churchyard's account was entered into the Stationers' Register as a pamphlet named A Discovrse of The Queenes Maiesties entertainement in Suffolk and Norffolk. Despite its title, it only covers the entertainments for the Queen in Norwich. Of these, it only contains the more courtly entertainments that were written by Churchyard himself in English, and these have an underlying focus upon Churchyard.

Roger North wrote in his household book about Elizabeth's visit to Kirtling, with John North also documenting some of the Progress, both joining and leaving the Queen at different points. Many documents concerning the progress are thus within the North family papers held at the Bodleian Library.

== Historiography ==
Archival information on Elizabeth's progresses, including the 1578 progress, was assembled by John Nichols in his work The Progresses and Public Processions of Queen Elizabeth I. The 1578 progress was the first progress to be the subject of a monograph; An Elizabethan Progress by Zillah Dovey. This work gathers archival documents on the progress into a narrative.

== See also ==
- Kempes Nine Daies Wonder, another Tudor-era journey from London to Norwich.
