= King Gurgunt =

Mythical King of England

King Gurgunt was a fictional and mythological king in Norwich, England. Gurgunt was possibly related to Celtic leader Gurgunt Barbtruc, an invention by medieval chronicler Geoffrey of Monmouth. It was falsely purported in the 16th century, in a planned yet unspoken speech to the visiting Queen Elizabeth I, that Gurgunt was the founder of the City of Norwich and builder of the Norwich Castle mound. By the mid-19th century, his legend had become that of a sleeping hero laying in the mound.

== History ==
Gurgunt is possibly a revival of the mythical Celtic leader Gurgunt Barbtruc, invented by medieval chronicler Geoffrey of Monmouth.

Upon the visit of Queen Elizabeth I to Norwich on 16 August 1578, part of the planned entertainments were for the Queen to meet "one which represented king Gurgunt, sometime king of England", in other words a dramatised version of Gurgunt, also named Gurguntius, at the Town Close. According to documents from two substantive witnesses, it was claimed that Gurgunt was a former King of England who had founded the City of Norwich. He was planned to show off Norwich Castle, which he would claim to have built, and to point out several parallels between the two monarchs, including both having grandfathers who ended civil wars, having fathers who were enemies to Rome (Gurgunt's father was said to be "King Belin"), and having founded schools at Cambridge. He would have spoken of the sacking of Rome by an ancient English army, and welcomed religious refugees. Gurgunt wore a costume of armour with green and white silk bases, and a black velvet hat with green and white feathers, as these were the family colours of the Tudors as well as the personal colours of the Queen. On the day, it rained and Elizabeth I left before the speech could be spoken to her; this was the only performer left disappointed.

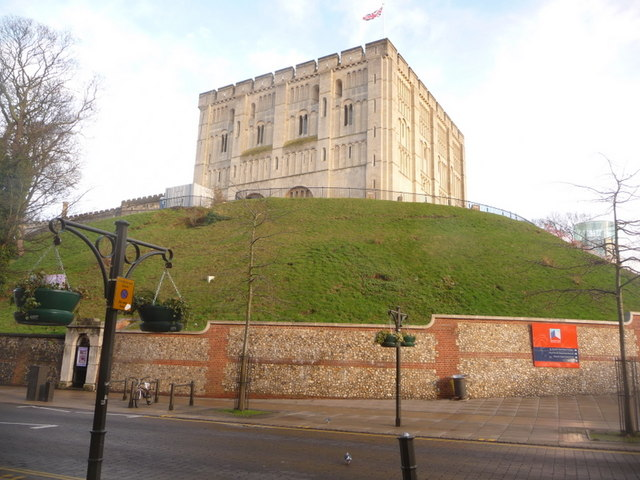
The Norwich Castle mound

Blomefeld, in his History of Norfolk in 1745, falsely stated that the mound upon which Norwich Castle sits was raised by Gurgunt and that the walls of the castle itself were built by Julius Caesar.

By the mid-19th century, the myth of King Gurgunt had become that of a sleeping hero. George Borrow in his 1851 work Lavengro describes a version of Gurgunt, though not by name, as "an old heathen king, who sits deep within [the castle motte], his sword in his hand and his gold and silver treasures about him."
