= Tottel's Miscellany =

Anthology of English poetry

Songes and Sonettes, usually called Tottel's Miscellany, was the first printed anthology of English poetry. First published by Richard Tottel in 1557 in London, it ran to many editions in the sixteenth century.

== Richard Tottel ==
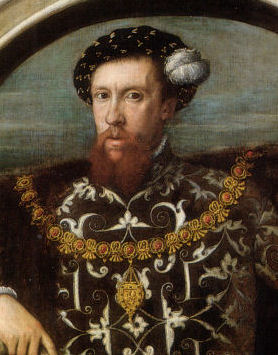
Henry Howard, Earl Of Surrey is generously represented in the miscellany, and credited with creating the English (or Shakespearean) form of sonnet.

Richard Tottel was an English publisher with a shop at Temple Bar on Fleet Street in London. His main business was the publication of law textbooks but his biggest contribution to English literature would come in the form of the anthology of poetry. He also gave the public Surrey's translation of the second and fourth books of Virgil's Aeneid, which is the earliest known example of English blank verse. He is responsible too for the first edition printed of Cicero's De Officiis in 1556 by Nicholas Grimald, who would later contribute to the poetry anthology.

Tottel also published Thomas More's Utopia and another collection of More's writings, John Lydgate's translations from Giovanni Boccaccio, and books by William Staunford and Thomas Tusser. The majority of his publications were legal treatises, including a legal history of the reign of Richard III, and legal yearbooks covering parts of the reigns of Henry VIII and Edward VI.

== Songes and Sonettes ==
The first edition of this work appeared on 5 June 1557 with the title Songes and Sonettes Written By the Ryght Honorable Lord Henry Howard, late Earle of Surrey, Thomas Wyatt the Elder and others. The volume consisted of 271 poems, none of which had ever been printed before. Songs and Sonettes was the first of the poetic anthologies that became popular by the end of the 16th century, and is considered to be Tottel's 'great contribution to English letters', as well as the first to be printed for the pleasure of the common reader. It was also the last large use of sonnet form for several decades, in published work, until the appearance of Philip Sidney's sonnet sequence Astrophel and Stella (1591) and the anthology The Phoenix Nest (1593).

Most of the poems included in the anthology were written in the 1530s but were only published in the first edition in 1557. Many of them were published posthumously. There are in total 54 actual sonnets in the anthology. These include nine from unknown authors, three from Nicholas Grimald, 15 from Surrey, and 27 from Wyatt.

The incorporated poetry had numerous comments on religion, covering Catholicism, Protestantism, and the English Reformation. Later editors of the early modern period then took out many of these religious references.

== Contributors ==
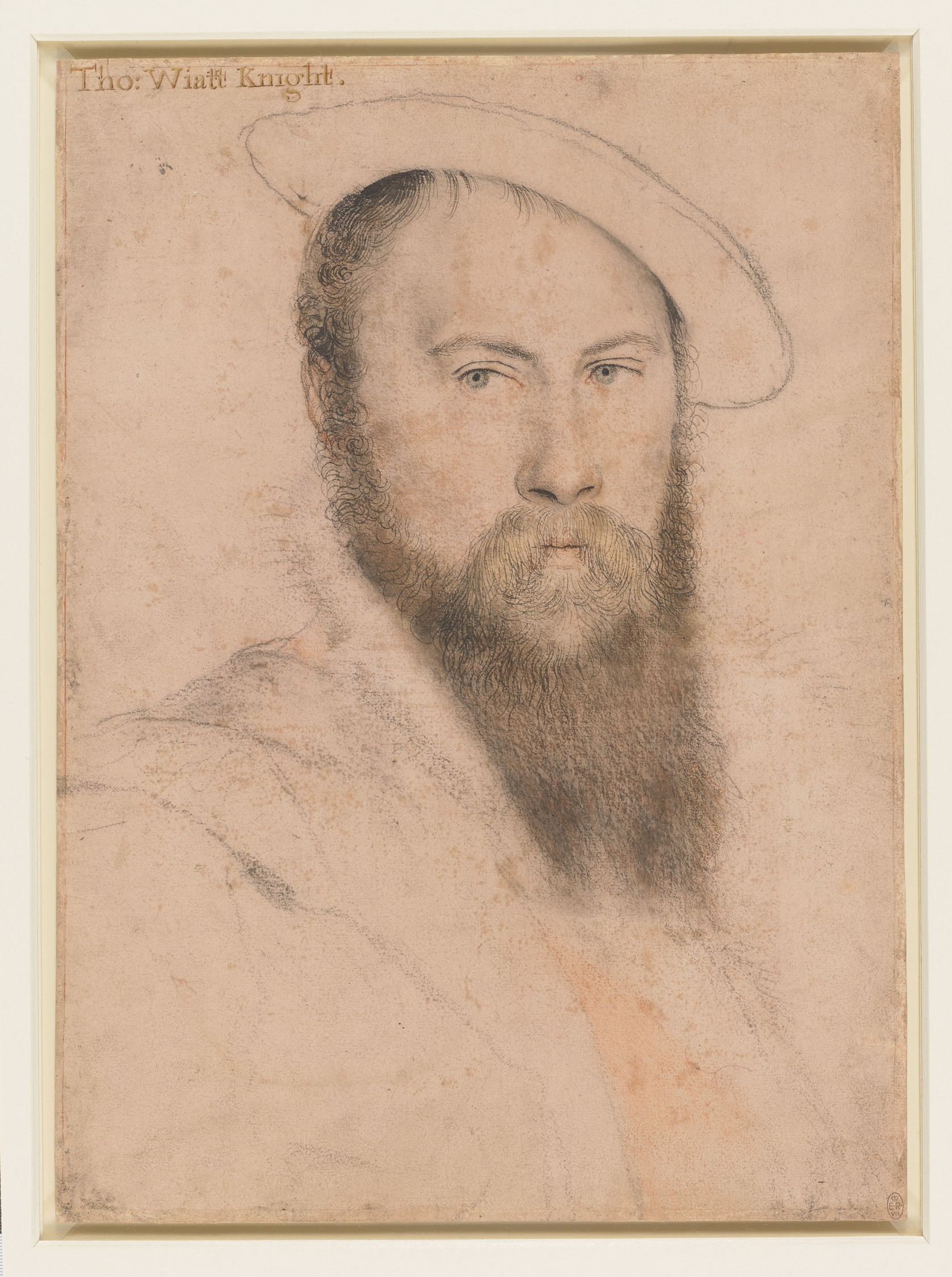
Sir Thomas Wyatt contributed 96 poems to Tottel's Miscellany.

The collection comprises mostly the works of Henry Howard, Earl of Surrey and Thomas Wyatt the Elder. Both were heavily influenced by Italian poetry, although Wyatt's meter would be adapted to conventional English iambic stress by Tottel.

The star poet of Tottel's Miscellany, the Earl of Surrey, created the English sonnet form by modifying the Petrarchan sonnet. If the English sonnet is also called the Shakespearean sonnet, that can be attributed to Shakespeare's fame. The form which Surrey created (three quatrains in alternate rhyme and a concluding couplet) is easier to write in English than the Petrarchan form, with its more complex rhyme scheme.

Wyatt's inclusion in Tottel's Miscellany would mark the first time this poet's work was printed. (Two of Surrey's poems had appeared in print). Other contributors include Nicholas Grimald, Thomas Norton, Thomas Vaux, John Heywood, Edward Somerset and other uncertain or unknown authors. Among these unknown authors, it is believed that Geoffrey Chaucer wrote at least one of the poems, titled in the anthology as, "To leade a vertuous and honest life." Although some of the wording has been altered slightly, this poem appears to be "a somewhat mutilated copy of Chaucer's ballad on 'Truth'".

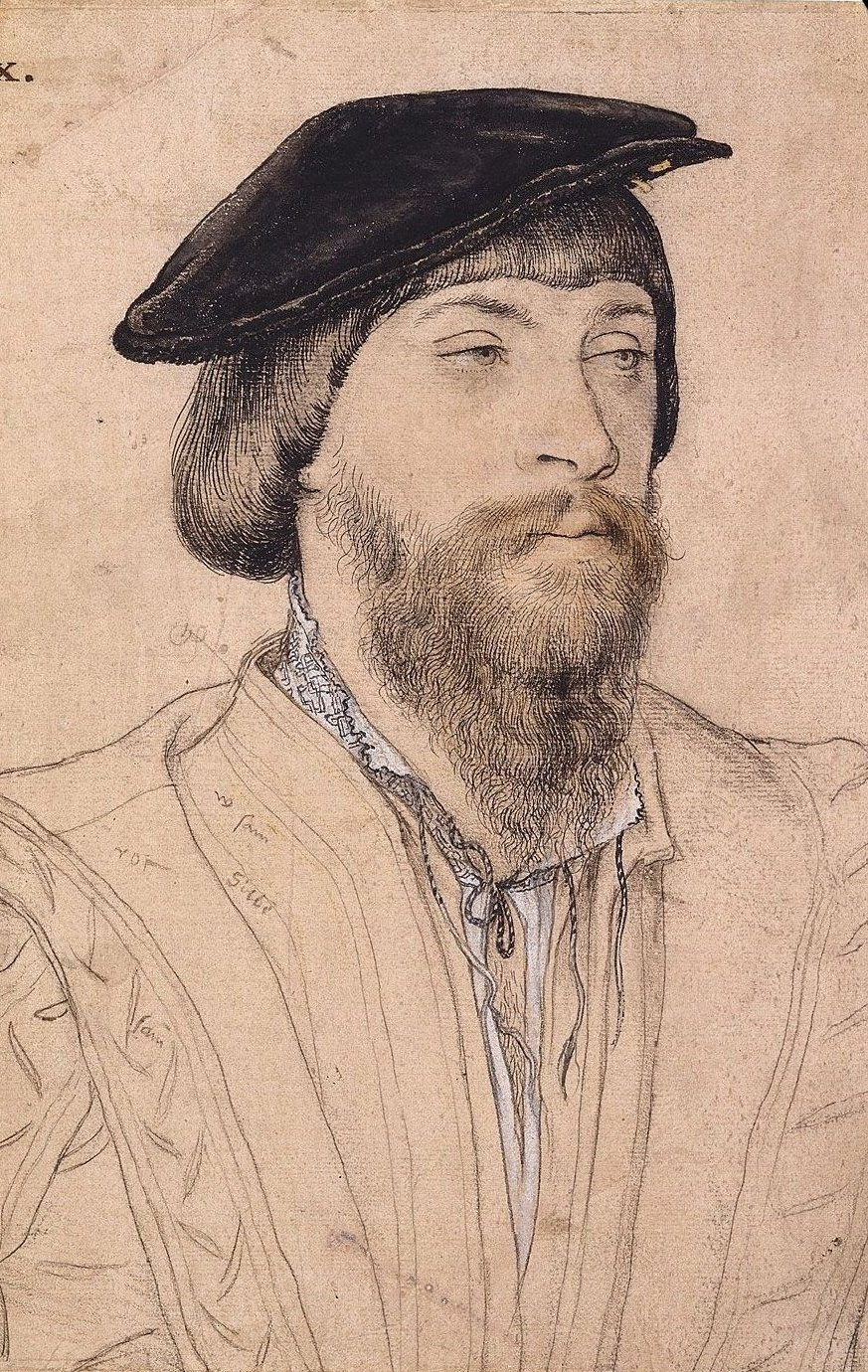
Thomas Vaux: one of his only two poems from the miscellany is misquoted in Shakespeare's Hamlet.

This is a sample of a poem by Sir Thomas Wyatt found in the text:.

They flee from me, that sometime did me seek
With naked foot stalking within my chamber.
Once have I seen them gentle, tame, and meek,
That now are wild, and do not once remember
That sometime they have put themselves in danger
To take bread at my hand, and now they range
Busily seeking in continual change.

(This poem, They Flee from Me, refers to Elizabeth I's mother, Anne Boleyn. Wyatt wisely withdrew from the chase in favor of a more heavyweight suitor. Each had the problem of being already married, but the other suitor, Henry VIII, eventually solved that one).

The first edition of Tottel's Miscellany (1557) featured forty poems by Surrey, ninety-six poems by Wyatt, forty poems by Grimald, and ninety-five poems written by unknown authors. Tottel made note that of those anonymous poems, the authors were sure to include Thomas Churchyard, Thomas Vaux, Edward Somerset, John Heywood and Sir Francis Bryan. It has been decided definitely that of those ninety-five poems, two were written by Vaux, one by John Heywood, and one by Somerset. The only first edition left is in the Bodleian Library in England. A reprint, which was limited to sixty copies, was edited by John Payne Collier in 1867.

The second edition was also published in 1557; thirty of Grimald's poems were removed but thirty-nine additional ones were added to the "uncertain authors" category with a final tally of 281 poems. There are only two copies of this work in existence left, one in the Grenville Collection at the British Museum, the other at Trinity College, Cambridge.

The next seven editions were all printed between 1558 and 1586, with the final ninth edition being published in 1587.

== Impact ==
It was so popular during the Elizabethan era it is considered the most influential of all Elizabethan miscellanies. It is generally included with Elizabethan era literature even though it was, in fact, published in 1557, a year before Elizabeth I took the throne.

Shakespeare uses some of its verses in The Merry Wives of Windsor and Hamlet, and directly quotes the anonymous poem "Against him that had slaundered a gentlewoman with him selfe", in The Rape of Lucrece:

"To me came Tarquin, armed to beguild,
With outward honesty but yet defiled..."

In the Miscellany the quote is

"so was the house defiled,
Oh Collatiue: so was the wife beguilde."

Songes and Sonettes is also known as the most important English poetic collection in the 16th century and inaugurated a long series of poetic anthologies in Elizabethan England.
