= Johann Mechtel =

Johann Mechtel was a chronicler; b. 1562 in Pfalzel near Trier in the Holy Roman Empire; d. after 1631, perhaps as late as 1653 in Trier. He is often named Pfalzel after his native town where he first studied and then went to the University of Trier, conducted by the Jesuits, where the historian Christopher Brote acquired a lasting influence over him. After his ordination (about 1587), he was appointed pastor at Eltz, near Limburg; in 1592 he became canon at Limburg and as such administered for two years the troublesome parish of Camberg. In 1604 he was appointed dean, but soon got into difficulties with his canons and finally, by request of the elector of Trier in order to restore peace, he resigned, and accepted the canonry at St. Paulinus in Trier.

In Limburg as well as in Trier he studied history, and collected documents, records and inscriptions on monuments. Many of his sources are now lost. Of his writings may be mentioned: Limburg Chronicle, the Pagus Lohenahe, and the Introductio in Pagum Lohenahe. His chief work, the Limburg Chronicle, was begun in 1610 and finished in 1612, but it was not edited until 1757 by Johann Nikolaus von Hontheim in his Prodromus historiae Trevirensis, II, 1046-1166. This edition, marked by many mistakes and omissions, was published in its entirety by Knetsch, in the Publications of the Historical Commission for Nassau, VI (Wiesbaden, 1909). It is a revision and continuation of the old Limburg chronicle, begun by the town clerk, Tilemann, but utilizes also many other sources both printed and unprinted. Mechtel utilizes various accounts which contain information as to social conditions, the price of corn and wine, the cultivation of the vine, climatic conditions and wages. Both his other works are as yet unpublished; Knetsch reviews their contents in his edition of the chronicle X-XVI.
