= Bernard Garter =

English poet (fl. 1565–1579)

Bernard Garter (fl. 1565–1579) was an English anti-papist poet who published The tragicall and true historie which happened betweene two English lovers, 1563 and 1565, A New Yeares Gifte, 1579, and perhaps several other miscellaneous pieces.

== Identity ==
Bernard Garter, who describes himself on his title-pages as a citizen of London, was, according to Hunter, the second son of Sir William Garter of London, and father of a Bernard Garter of Brigstocke, Northamptonshire. But in the Visitation of London, 1633–1635, "Barnerd Garter of Brikstocke", Northamptonshire, is described as the son of Thomas Garter, the husband of Elizabeth Catelyne, and the father of George Garter, who was living in 1634.

== Works ==
Garter wrote:

1. The tragicall and true historie which happened betweene two English lovers, 1563. Written by Ber. Gar., 1565. In ædibus Richardi Totelli, an imitation in ballad metre of Arthur Broke's Romeus and Juliet, 1561. A copy of this very rare book was, in 1890, in the library of Christie Miller at Britwell.
2. A New Yeares Gifte, dedicated to the Popes Holinesse and all Catholikes addicted to the Sea of Rome: prepared the first day of Januarie [1579] by B. G., Citizen of London, London, by Henry Bynneman, 1579. This work, wrongly ascribed by Ritson to Barnabe Googe, contains, besides verses against the Catholics, a reprint of a letter sent in 1537 by Tunstall, bishop of Durham, and Stokesley, bishop of London, to Cardinal Pole, maintaining the royal supremacy; lives of Alexander II and Gregory VII; an account of the frauds of Elizabeth Barton, Maid of Kent; and "invectives against the pope". "A new yeres geyfte made by barnarde Garter" was licensed for printing to Alexander Lacy in 1565.

A tract entitled The joyfull receavinge of the Quenes ma^{tie} into Norwiche (licensed 30 August 1578) includes a masque by Garter and Henry Goldingham, which is printed in Nichols's Progresses, ii. 67. Pasquin in a Trance. A Christian and learned dialogue contayning wonderfull and most strange newes out of Heaven, Purgatorie, and Hell, 4to, London, by Seres, n.d. (licensed 1565), has some prefatory verses to the reader signed "Ber. Gar."; it is a translation from the Italian of Celius Secundus Curio, and Collier is inclined to credit Garter with the whole. "Among Coxeter's papers", writes Warton, "is mentioned the ballet of Helen's epistle to Paris from "Ovid," in 1570, by B. G." This piece Warton also doubtfully claims for Garter. The "B. G." who wrote Ludus Scacchiæ: Chesse-playe, a game pleasant, wittie, and politicall, London, 1597, is further identified with Garter by Hunter.

== Sources ==
- Lee, Sidney; Steggle, Matthew (2008). "Garter, Bernard (fl. 1565–1579), poet". Oxford Dictionary of National Biography (online ed.). Oxford University Press. doi:10.1093/ref:odnb/10412. (Subscription, Wikipedia Library access or UK public library membership required.)

Attribution:

- This article incorporates text from a publication now in the public domain: Lee, Sidney (1890). "Garter, Bernard". In Stephen, Leslie (ed.). Dictionary of National Biography. Vol. 21. London: Smith, Elder & Co. p. 30.
