= Sleeve garter =

Garter worn on the sleeve of a shirt

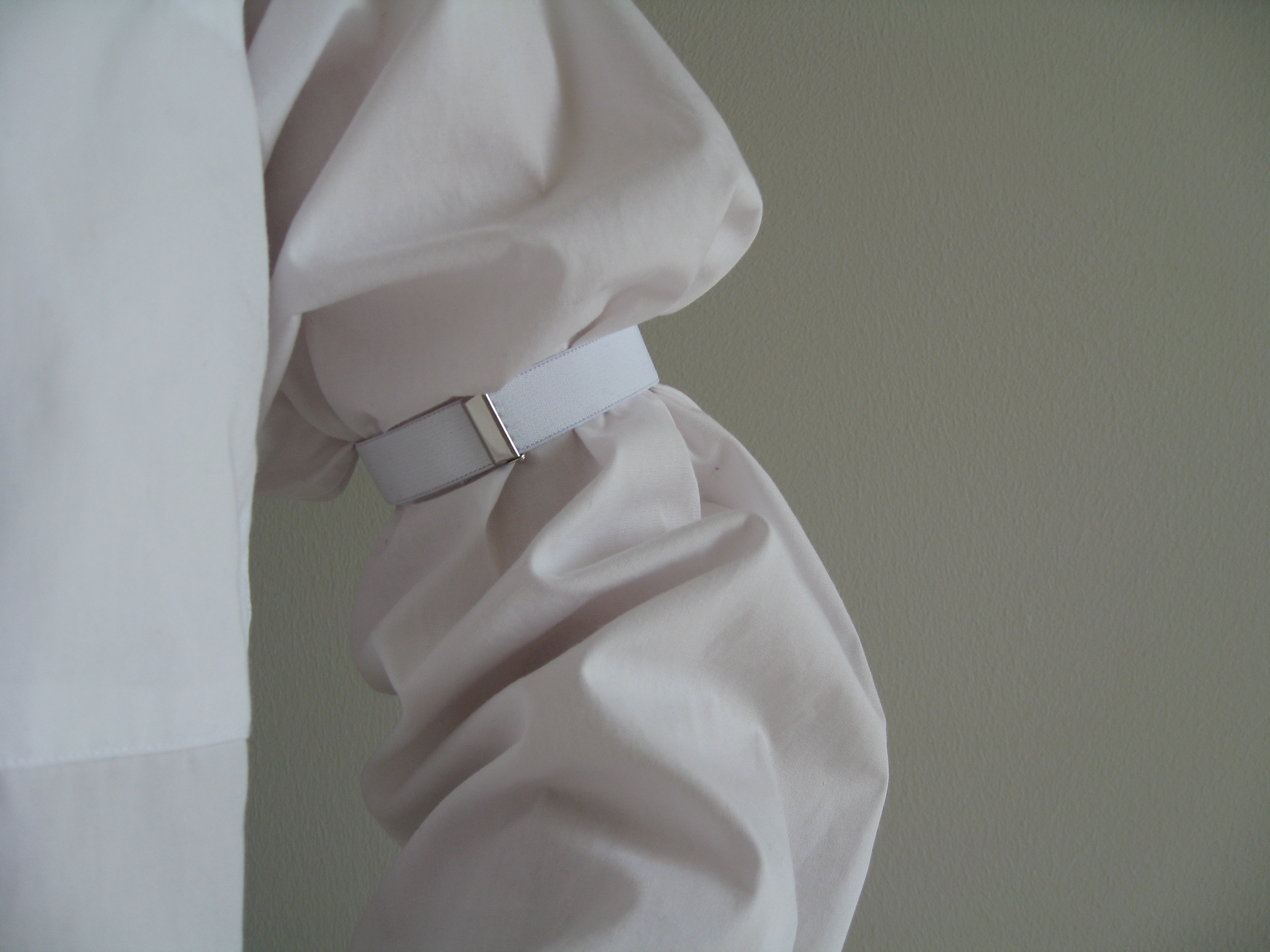

A sleeve garter is a garter worn on the sleeve of a shirt. It came into wide use especially in the United States in the latter half of the 19th century, when men's ready-made shirts came in a single (extra long) sleeve length. Sleeve garters allow individuals to adjust sleeve lengths and prevent cuffs from being soiled while working, or kept at the correct length when worn under a jacket.

== Use ==
While a century ago sleeve garters were worn by men regardless of profession (with the possible exception of the wealthy or those with tailored shirts), today sleeve garters are usually seen in relation to one of the following contexts.

=== Music ===
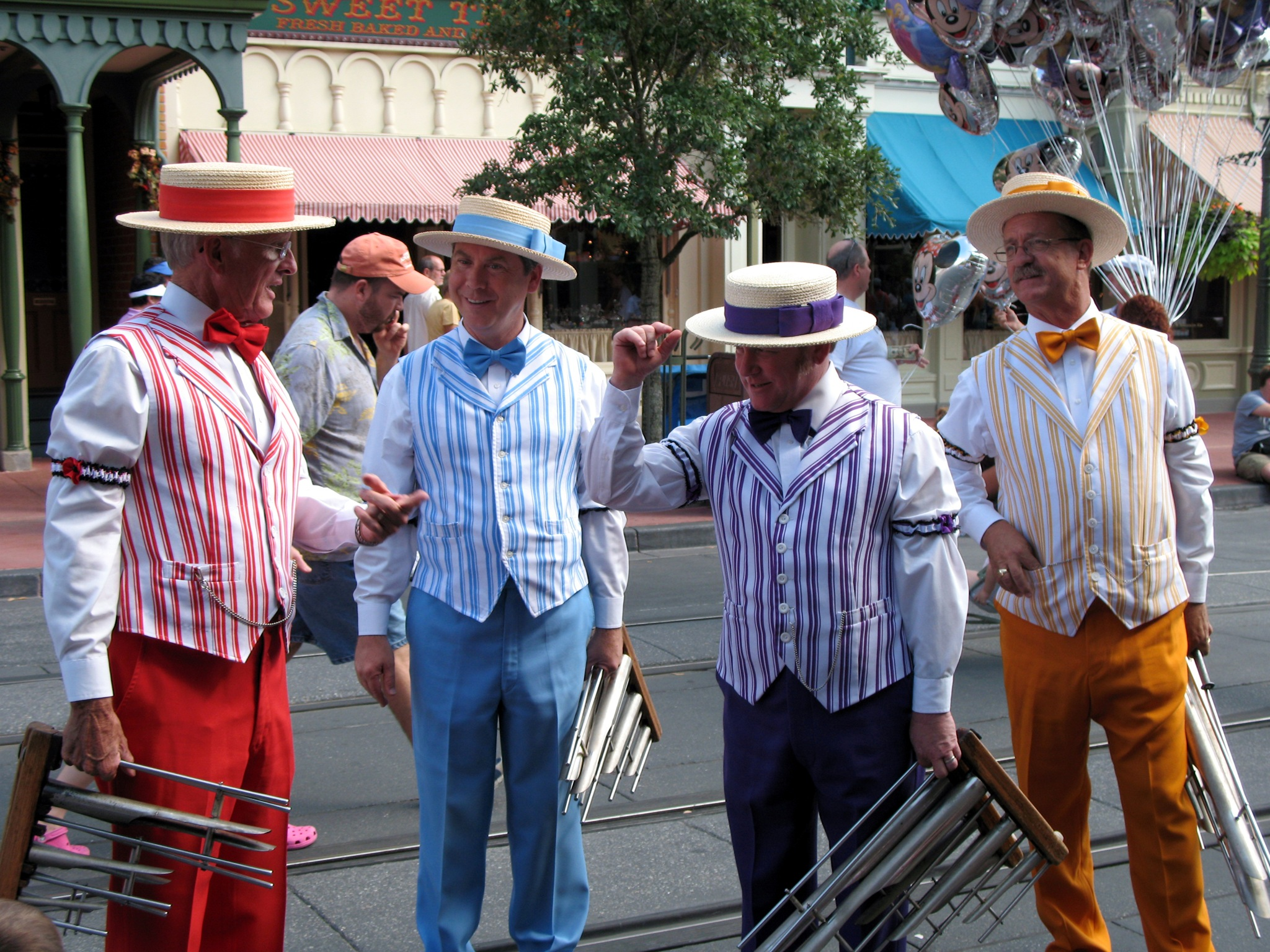
The Dapper Dans, a barbershop quartet at Walt Disney World, wearing sleeve garters

According to jazz historian Al Rose, the popular image of an early 20th-century saloon pianist being flashily dressed with arm garters was inspired by the way Tony Jackson used to dress while performing.

=== Gambling ===
Today, sleeve garters are part of the costume of poker dealers and other card dealers in casinos. While this is widely understood to make it more difficult for the dealer to cheat by concealing a card in his sleeve, the sleeve garter is usually accompanied by a vest and bow tie (and sometimes a visor), suggesting this usage might date to late 19th and early 20th-century fashion as much as it serves a real purpose.

=== Old West ===
The sleeve garter is often seen in modern depictions of the Old West, not only on musicians and gamblers but on the stereotypical well-dressed gunslinger. In this case, the suggestion may be that the sleeve garter facilitates freedom of movement and aids in gunslingers’ ability to quick draw.

Today, the sleeve garter sometimes accessorizes the costumes of rodeo participants. A small ornamental plate called a “concho”, typically with an Old West motif, may be attached to the garter.

=== Bookkeeping ===
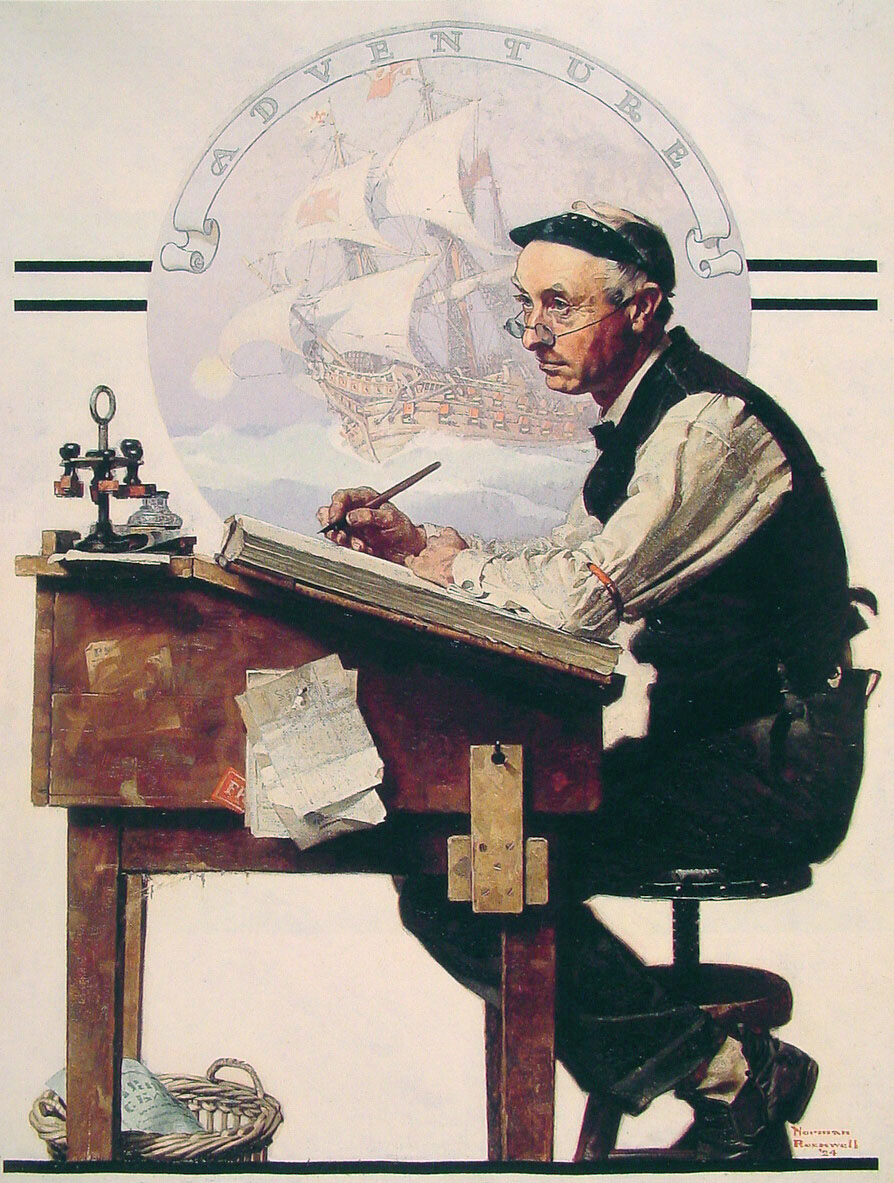
Daydreaming Bookkeeper illustration, 1924

Day Dreaming Bookkeeper, Norman Rockwell's 1924 illustration, shows an accountant wearing a vest, a visor, a bow tie and very narrow sleeve garters. While the fellow is probably meant to be seen as old fashioned in his dress, the presence of sleeve garters in this picture may indicate that men who worked with papers and ink sometimes wore sleeve garters for practical reasons until the second quarter of the 20th century.

== See also ==
- Suspenders
