= Nicholas Grimald =

16th-century English poet and dramatist (1519–1562)

Nicholas Grimald (or Grimoald) (1519–1562) was an English poet and dramatist.

== Life ==
Nicholas Grimald was born to a modest yeoman family of farmers in 1519–20. His parents are unknown, despite the popular belief that his father was Giovanni Baptista Grimaldi. The poem A funeral song, upon the death of Annes his moother, accounts for his mother's death. Grimald's mother has been speculated to be Agnes Gyrmbold, who dies in 1555. The poem mentions his hardworking father, but focuses upon the fondness that he had for his mother. Grimald saw his parents' love and devotion for each other and expressed that in the poem. He was the only boy out of many girls.

Maps found of Huntingdonshire in the 16th century do not show a place that could be Brownshold. What was found was an estate named Leighton Bromswold. This is the closest match to how Grimald describes his home in the poem A funeral song, upon the death of Annes his moother.

The Grimald family was seen to be living in Leighton Bromswold for close to four hundred years. Their last name had gone through variations as shown by legal documents kept by the village. Variations include: Grymbaud, Grymbold, Grymbolde, Grimbold, Grimald, Grimbald, and Grymbalde.

There has been no evidence of Grimald ever being married or having children. Some of his contributed verses in Tottle's Songes and Sonnettes refer to two women Grimald my have admired, Carie Day and Mistress Damascene Awdley. These verses show a debate on if marriage has the desired result that is wanted.

Grimald's connection to Nicholas Ridley (martyr), bishop of London, brought him under suspicion, and he was imprisoned in the Marshalsea. It is said that he escaped the penalties of heresy by recanting his errors, and was despised accordingly by his Protestant contemporaries.

The exact date, cause, and location of his death are unknown. Barnabe Googe, in his Eglogs, Epythaphes, and Sonettes (1563), included An Epytaphes on the Death of Nicholas Grimaold, which was written before Googe's departure abroad in 1562.

== Education and early career ==
When Nicholas Grimald was fifteen years old, he started showing signs of poetic talent. His mother, who placed an emphasis on education, sent him to continue his education at Cambridge. This separation was hard for Grimald's mother, as he was the only boy in the family.

In 1539–40, Grimald graduated from Christ's College with a B.A.. Grimald travelled to Oxford a year later, when the prebendary of Leighton Bromswold Gilbert Smith, a family friend, was impressed by his work. In his first few years in Oxford, Grimald attended Brasenose College. When Grimald was unable to continue his school work because he lacked his books, his first drama was written. Grimald received encouragement from the Matthew Smith, the president of the school, along with other teachers and students who were eager to participate in the arts. The play was the Latin resurrection play Christus Redivivus. Grimald dedicated his work to Smith. It was written in 1541, but was published two years later in Germany in 1543.

At twenty-three years old in 1542, Grimald was able to acquire his B.A. at Oxford. This degree allowed his admission into Merton College, where he received his M.A. in 1544. In that same year, Grimald travelled back to Cambridge to get his M.A. at Christ's College. Grimald chose to stay in Oxford after his degrees in 1544. His next work was another Latin tragedy based on the life and death of John the Baptist called Archipropheta in 1548. Grimald was licensed as a lecturer in 1552 by Richard Sampson, this allowed him to preach at Eccles. The next year he was appointed chaplain to Nicholas Ridley, bishop of London. Ridely's high opinion of Grimald was shown when the bishop chose him to deliver a Latin address in April 1553, Oratio ad pontifices.

== Involvement with Nicholas Ridley ==
Nicholas Grimald was appointed chaplain to Nicholas Ridley, bishop of London, in 1552. Previously, in a letter written to Sir John Gates and Sir William Cecil, Ridley praised Grimald for his preferment and commended him for his "eloquence in both English and Latin" (Matthew; Harrison 13). Ridley's high opinion was later confirmed when the Bishop appointed Grimald to deliver the Latin address in April 1553, at an assembled bishops' meeting on absentee clergy.

The possible apostasy under Mary I put considerable strife on their relationship, and ultimately lead to its demise. Following Ridley's successful recommendation for Grimald to be appointed chantership of St Paul's Cathedral, Queen Mary acceded to the throne. Queen Mary's brutal prosecution of Protestants led to Ridley's imprisonment. While in prison, Ridley wrote to Grimald and potentially sent him Lorenzo Valla's De falso credita et ementita Constantini Donatione declamatio, a text denouncing the pope's claim to dominion (13). The correspondence caught the attention of the Catholic authority and consequently led to Grimald's imprisonment in the Marshalsea prison in 1555 (Stephen;Lee 1917).

Grimald's imprisonment was brief, and many speculated the poet's apostasy to Catholicism. Originally, Grimald quelled the accusations. In response to rumours of Grimald's collusion with the Catholic Church, Ridley said, "it will not sink into my head to think that Grimbol would ever play me such a Judas's part" (Matthew;Harrison 13). Ridley later confirmed Grimald's betrayal, and said, in response Grimald's imprisonment and apostasy to Catholicism, that "he (Grimald) escaped not without some becking and bowing (alas) of is knee unto Baal" (13). It is unclear whether or not there was reconciliation prior to Ridley's execution.

== Works ==
Upon arriving at Oxford, Grimald began his first major work; the Latin resurrection and tragicomedy Christus Redivus or The Resurrection of Christ. His motivation for starting the play was to redeem not being able to perform his studies because his books had come late. When proposing the idea of writing a play, Grimald received support from his peers, teachers, and even the college's president. The story of the play consisted of the resurrection of Christ, and is thought to have been made for an Eastertime performance. It is believed Grimald wrote a companion play later in his life called Christus nascens, a nativity play made to be performed for Christmas. Christus Redivus was dedicated to the Archdeacon of Peterborough Gilbert Smith, and was eventually published in 1543 at Cologne.

It cannot be determined whether Grimald was familiar with George Buchanan's Baptistes (1543), or with Jakob Schöpper's Johannes decollatus vel Ectrachelistes (1546). Grimald provides a purely romantic motive for the catastrophe in the passionate attachment of Herodias to Herod Antipas, and constantly resorts to lyrical methods. As a poet Grimald is memorable as the earliest follower of Henry Howard, Earl of Surrey in the production of blank verse. He writes sometimes simply enough, as in the lines on his own childhood addressed to his mother, but in general his style is more artificial, and his metaphors more studied than is the case with the other contributors to the Miscellany. His classical reading shows itself in the comparative terseness and smartness of his verses.

Archipropheta or The Archprophet, published in 1548, was a Latin drama that depicted the life of John the Baptist. Grimald submitted the play with his application for a fellowship with the new Dean of Christ Church, Dr Richard Cox. The application got him a job at the college as "a senior or theologist" where he would give lectures on rhetoric. Archipropheta is one of the first tragedies to be penned by an Englishman.

Grimald's name is attributed to the work Vox Populi, or The People's Complaint, published in 1549. The piece of writing criticised Church officials for failing to carry out their jobs correctly. According to Merrill, the work revolves around "those rectors, vicars, archdeacons, deans, prebendaries, etc., who spend their lives far from their flocks, or do not perform their sacred duties."

He translated Cicero's De Officiis as Marcus Tullius Ciceroes thre bokes of duties (1556); a Latin paraphrase of Virgil's Georgics (printed 1591) is attributed to him, but most of the works assigned to him by John Bale are lost. Two Latin tragedies are extant: Archipropheta sive Johannes Baptista, printed at Cologne in 1548, probably performed at Oxford the year before, and Christus redivivus (Cologne, 1543), edited by JM Hart (for the Modern Language Association of America, 1886, separately issued 1899).

Grimald contributed forty poems to the original edition (June 1557) of Songes and Sonettes (commonly known as Tottel's Miscellany). Two of Grimald's poems printed in Miscellany, The Death of Zoroas and Marcus Tullius Ciceroes Death, are regarded as some of the first examples of English blank verse ever published. It is also possible that Grimald was an editor of the first edition of Miscellany. It is speculated that most of Grimald's work was removed from the second edition due to his recantation of Protestantism. Tottel feared that Grimald's recantation would cause book sales to decline, and thus decided to omit many of Grimald's original works from the updated version. All of Grimald's more personal works were left out of the second edition, and only his initials were used to signify his authorship of the nine remaining poems.

== Bibliography ==
- Christus Redivivus (1543)
- Archipropheta (1548)
- Vox Popli (1549)
- Marcus Tullius Ciceroes thre bokes of duties (Translation of Cicero's De Officiis) (1556)
- Contributed poems to the collection Songes & Sonettes (1557)

== See also ==
- Canons of Elizabethan poetry
