= Arthur Brooke (poet) =

English poet (died 1563)

- Died: 19 March 1563
- Occupation: poet
- Notable work: The Tragical History of Romeus and Juliet

Arthur Brooke (died 19 March 1563) was an English poet who wrote and created various works including The Tragical History of Romeus and Juliet (1562), considered to be William Shakespeare's chief source for his tragedy Romeo and Juliet (published in 1597).

== Life ==
The Oxford Dictionary of National Biography suggests that Brooke may have been a son of Thomas Broke.

Brooke was admitted to the Inner Temple, at the request of Gorboduc's authors, Thomas Norton and Thomas Sackville. He may have written the masque that accompanied the play.

On 19 March 1563, Brooke died in the shipwreck that also killed Sir Thomas Finch, bound for Le Havre, besieged in the French Wars of Religion. In 1567 George Turberville published a collection of poetry entitled, Epitaphes, Epigrams, Songs and Sonets; it included “An Epitaph on the Death of Master Arthur Brooke Drownde in Passing to New Haven”.

== The Tragical History of Romeus and Juliet ==
Though ostensibly a translation from the Italian of Bandello, Brooke's poem is derived from a French version by Pierre Boaistuau. The work was published by Richard Tottell.

Bernard Garter published The Tragicall and True Historie which Happened betweene Two English Lovers (1565), which imitated Brooke's work in a ballad metre. A prose version of Romeo and Juliet (1567) was printed in The Palace of Pleasure, a collection of tales edited by William Painter. Shakespeare stuck quite closely to the version by Brooke.
