= The Tragical History of Romeus and Juliet =

1562 narrative poem by Arthur Brooke

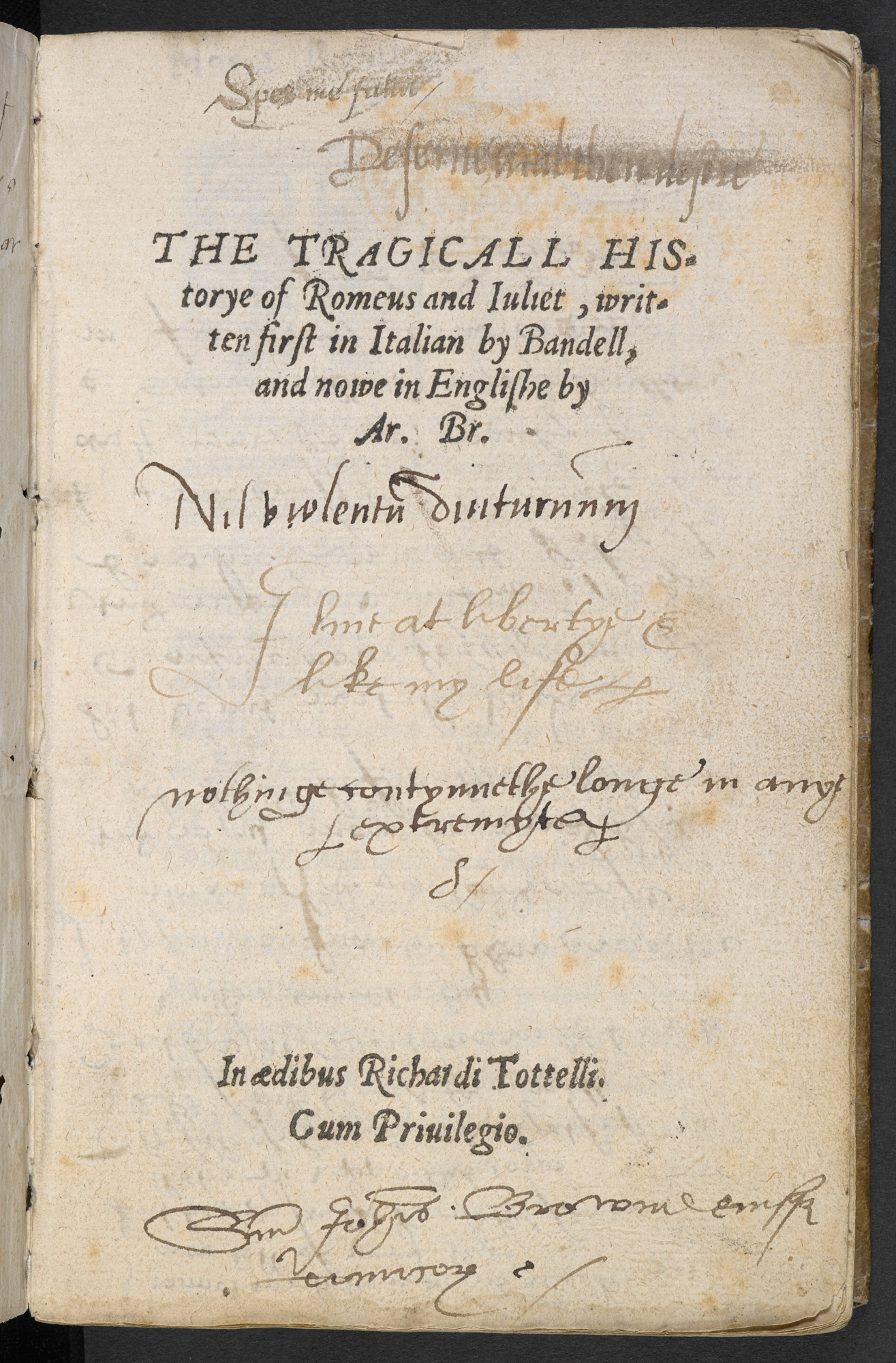
Frontispiece of The Tragicall Historye of Romeus and Juliet.

The Tragical History of Romeus and Juliet is an English language narrative poem by Arthur Brooke, first published in 1562 by Richard Tottel, which was a key source for William Shakespeare’s Romeo and Juliet. It is a translation and adaptation of a French story by Pierre Boaistuau, itself derived from an Italian novella by Matteo Bandello.

Little is known about Arthur Brooke. He was admitted as a member of Inner Temple on 18 December 1561 under the sponsorship of Thomas Sackville and Thomas Norton. He drowned in 1563 in a shipwreck while crossing to help Protestant forces in the French Wars of Religion.

== Source material ==
Matteo Bandello’s version of the Romeo and Juliet story appeared as “La sfortunata morte di due infelicissimi amanti” (“The Unfortunate Death of Two Most Wretched Lovers”) and it was published in Lucca (Italy) in 1554 in the second part (or volume) of his Novelle.

Bandello's novella was then adapted by Pierre Boaistuau (1559, Paris).

== Plot ==
The plot of Shakespeare's Romeo and Juliet takes place over four days while Brooke's narrative takes place over many months. The poem's ending differs significantly from Shakespeare's play — in the poem, the nurse is banished and the apothecary hanged for their involvement in the deception, while Friar Lawrence leaves Verona to end his days in a hermitage.
