= List of Keira Knightley performances =

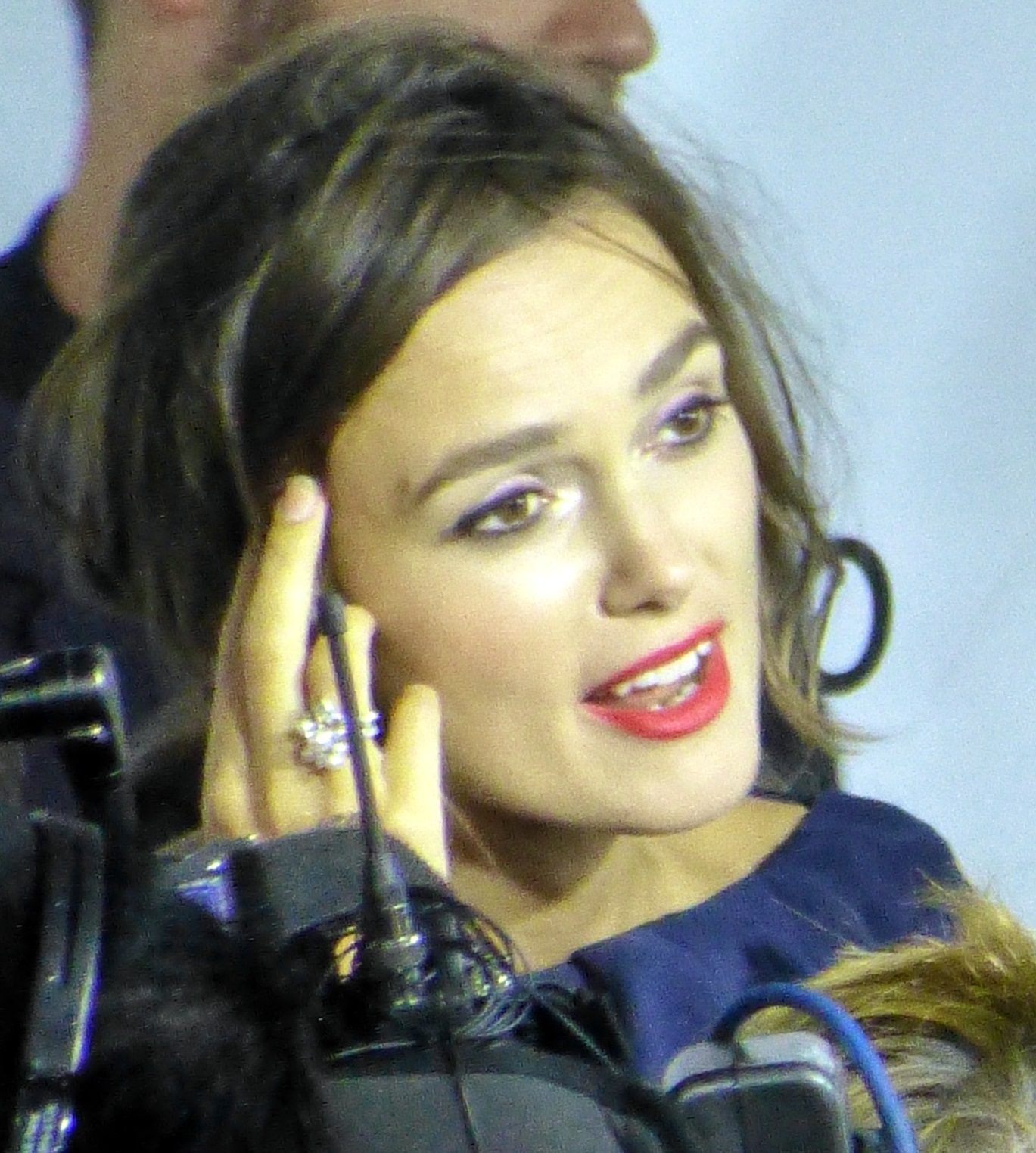
Knightley in 2014

Keira Knightley is an English actress who began her career by appearing in commercials and television films, including The Treasure Seekers (1996), Coming Home (1998), and Oliver Twist (1999) before making her major motion picture debut in the space-opera epic Star Wars: Episode I – The Phantom Menace (1999) as Padmé Amidala's handmaiden. She portrayed the daughter of Robin Hood in the romantic adventure film Princess of Thieves (2001), her first starring role, and earned her breakthrough by playing a teen tomboy footballer in sports comedy Bend It Like Beckham (2002). A year later, Knightley rose to global stardom after appearing as Elizabeth Swann in the fantasy swashbuckler film Pirates of the Caribbean: The Curse of the Black Pearl, co-starring Johnny Depp and Orlando Bloom, for which she received two Saturn Award nominations, one for Best Supporting Actress.

She then appeared in the Richard Curtis-directed Christmas romance Love Actually (2003) as a woman whose fiancé's best man is secretly in love with her. Knightley portrayed the daughter of an alcoholic in the psychological thriller The Jacket (2005). She starred as Elizabeth Bennet in Joe Wright's romantic drama Pride & Prejudice (2005), for which Knightley received her first nomination for an Academy Award for Best Actress in a Leading Role, becoming the third-youngest Best Actress nominee. The film clinched her long association with period dramas. She reprised her role as Swann in Pirates of the Caribbean: Dead Man's Chest (2006) and Pirates of the Caribbean: At World's End (2007); the former is her highest-grossing release. Knightley subsequently appeared in two wartime dramas; as a complex love interest in Wright's Atonement (2007), which earned her an Empire Award for Best Actress and a jazz singer in the biopic The Edge of Love (2008). She starred as eighteenth-century tastemaker Georgiana Cavendish in the drama The Duchess (2008), for which she received positive reviews.

She made her theatre debut as a shallow, amorous film star in The Misanthrope, which earned Knightley her a nomination for the Olivier Award for Best Actress in a Supporting Role in a Play. Also on West End, she then portrayed a schoolteacher accused of lesbianism in The Children's Hour. She reunited with Wright for the third time with historical romance Anna Karenina (2012), playing the titular aristocratic socialite to critical acclaim. Knightley expanded into contemporary roles with musical drama Begin Again (2014), starring as an aspiring songwriter, and action thriller Jack Ryan: Shadow Recruit (2014) as a medical student. Her role as an overeducated underachiever in the rom-com Laggies (2014) was followed by a return to historical parts as cryptanalyst Joan Clarke in the drama The Imitation Game (2014), which garnered Knightley an Academy Award for Best Supporting Actress nomination. The following year, she made her Broadway debut in Thérèse Raquin playing a psychotic and repressed wife. Knightley appeared as the eponymous Belle Époque writer in biographical film Colette (2018) to positive reception. In wartime drama The Aftermath (2019), Knightley portrayed a cold, complex army wife. She starred in succeeding political dramas as whistleblower Katharine Gun in Official Secrets (2019) and feminist Sally Alexander in Misbehaviour (2020).

== Film ==
Year	Title	Role	Notes	Ref.
1995	Innocent Lies	Young Celia		
1999	Star Wars: Episode I – The Phantom Menace	Sabé	Credit misspelled as "Kiera" Knightley	
2001	Deflation	Jogger	Short film	
2001	The Hole	Frankie Smith		
2002	Thunderpants	Music School Student	Uncredited	
2002	Pure	Louise		
2002	Bend It Like Beckham	Jules Paxton		
2002	New Year's Eve	Leah	Short film	
2002	The Seasons Alter	Helena	Short film	
2003	Pirates of the Caribbean: The Curse of the Black Pearl	Elizabeth Swann		
2003	Love Actually	Juliet		
2003	Gaijin	Kate	Short film; voice role	
2004	King Arthur	Guinevere		
2005	The Jacket	Jackie Price		
2005	Pride & Prejudice	Elizabeth Bennet		
2005	Domino	Domino Harvey		
2006	Pirates of the Caribbean: Dead Man's Chest	Elizabeth Swann		
2007	Pirates of the Caribbean: At World's End	Elizabeth Swann		
2007	Atonement	Cecilia Tallis		
2007	Silk	Hélène Joncour		
2008	The Edge of Love	Vera Phillips		
2008	The Duchess	Georgiana Cavendish		
2009	The Continuing and Lamentable Saga of the Suicide Brothers	The Fairy	Short film	
2010	Never Let Me Go	Ruth C		
2010	Maze	Constance	Video installation	
2010	Last Night	Joanna Reed		
2010	Steve	Woman	Short film	
2010	London Boulevard	Charlotte		
2011	A Dangerous Method	Sabina Spielrein		
2012	Seeking a Friend for the End of the World	Penelope Lockhart		
2012	Anna Karenina	Anna Arkadyevna Karenina		
2013	Once Upon a Time	Gabrielle Chanel	Short film	
2013	Begin Again	Gretta James		
2014	Jack Ryan: Shadow Recruit	Cathy Muller		
2014	Laggies	Megan Burch		
2014	The Imitation Game	Joan Clarke		
2015	Everest	Jan Hall		
2016	Collateral Beauty	Amy / "Love"		
2017	Pirates of the Caribbean: Dead Men Tell No Tales	Elizabeth Swann-Turner	Cameo	
2018	Colette	Gabrielle Colette		
2018	The Nutcracker and the Four Realms	Sugar Plum Fairy		
2019	Official Secrets	Katharine Gun		
2019	Berlin, I Love You	Jane	Segment: "Under Your Feet"	
2019	The Aftermath	Rachael Morgan		
2019	Greed	Herself	Cameo	
2020	Misbehaviour	Sally Alexander		
2021	Charlotte	Charlotte Salomon	Voice role	
2021	Silent Night	Nell		
2023	Boston Strangler	Loretta McLaughlin		
2025	The Woman in Cabin 10	Laura "Lo" Blacklock		

== Television ==
Year	Title	Role	Notes	Ref.
1993	Screen One	Little Girl	Episode: "Royal Celebration"	
1995	A Village Affair	Natasha Jordan	Television film	
1995	The Bill	Sheena Rose	Episode: "Swan Song"	
1996	The Treasure Seekers	The Princess	Television film	
1998	Coming Home	Young Judith Dunbar	Television film	
1999	Oliver Twist	Rose Fleming	Miniseries	
2001	Princess of Thieves	Gwyn	Television film	
2002	Doctor Zhivago	Lara Antipova	Miniseries	
2007	Robbie the Reindeer in Close Encounters of the Herd Kind	Em	Television short film; voice role	
2011	Neverland	Tinker Bell	Miniseries; voice role	
2017	Red Nose Day Actually	Juliet	Television short film	
2024–present	Black Doves	Helen Webb	Main role	

== Theatre ==
Year	Production	Role	Playwright	Theatre	Ref.
1999	After Juliet	Rosaline	Sharman Macdonald	Heatham House Youth Centre, Twickenham	
2009–2010	The Misanthrope	Jennifer (Célimène)	Molière	Comedy Theatre, West End	
2011	The Children's Hour	Karen Wright	Lillian Hellman	Comedy Theatre, West End	
2015	Thérèse Raquin	Thérèse Raquin	Helen Edmundson	Roundabout Theatre Company, New York City	
2026	The Lives of Others	Christa-Maria Sieland	Robert Icke	Adelphi Theatre, West End	

== Video games ==
List of video game credits
Year	Title	Voice role	Notes	Ref.
2003	Pirates of the Caribbean	Narrator		

== Music videos ==
List of music video credits
Year	Title	Artist(s)	Role	Director(s)
2017	"Let Her Love In"	Shock Machine (James Righton)	The Girl with the Pink Dress	James Righton

== Radio ==
List of radio credits
Year	Title	Voice role	Notes
1999	Villette	Polly	

== Audiobooks ==
List of audio books credits
Year	Title	Voice role	Notes	Ref.
2026	Harry Potter: The Full-Cast Audio Editions †	Dolores Umbridge		

== Discography ==
Guest appearances

List of musical guest appearances
Year	Album	Track(s)
2007	Pirates of the Caribbean: At World's End	"Hoist the Colours"
2008	The Edge of Love	"Overture / Blue Tahitian Moon" (featuring Angelo Badalamenti)
2008	The Edge of Love	"After the Bombing / Hang Out the Stars in Indiana" (featuring Angelo Badalamenti)
2008	The Edge of Love	"Drifting and Dreaming" (featuring Angelo Badalamenti)
2008	The Edge of Love	"Maybe It's Because I Love You Too Much" (featuring Angelo Badalamenti)
2014	Begin Again	"Tell Me If You Wanna Go Home"
2014	Begin Again	"Lost Stars"
2014	Begin Again	"Like a Fool"
2014	Begin Again	"Coming Up Roses"
2014	Begin Again	"A Step You Can't Take Back"
2014	Begin Again	"Tell Me If You Wanna Go Home (Roof Top Mix)" (featuring Hailee Steinfeld)

== See also ==
- List of British actors
- List of British Academy Award nominees and winners
- List of actors with Academy Award nominations
- List of actors with two or more Academy Award nominations in acting categories
- List of awards and nominations received by Keira Knightley
