= Del Synnott =

Irish actor (born 1977)

- Born: 17 October 1977 (age 48); Dublin, Ireland
- Other name: Del Synott
- Years active: 1999–present
- Website: http://www.delsynnott.com/

Derek Synnott (born 17 October 1977) is an Irish actor. He played Froderick in Princess of Thieves and DC Alan Carter in Murphy's Law.

Synnott was born and raised in Dublin, Ireland. When he was 11 years old, he and his family moved to Essex, England in 1989. He attended The Hedley Walter School, in Brentwood, Essex, from 1989 where he first honed his acting skills. He invented a character called "Budder".

He has also appeared in the TV version of Lock, Stock and Two Smoking Barrels titled "Lock Stock" and the Samuelson Productions feature Stormbreaker. In 2013, he appeared in The Great Train Robbery as Brian Field.

His first TV role was in the miniseries Every Woman Knows a Secret in 1999. Since then he has had major roles in programs such as Dangerfield, Waking the Dead, Red Cap, Doc Martin and New Tricks.

== Personal life ==
Synnott met actress Keira Knightley on the set of the 2001 TV movie Princess of Thieves. Synnott was 24 years old while Knightley was 16. The two later appeared together in the short film Deflation by Roger Ashton-Griffiths and as extras in the larger film Thunderpants. In 2003, Synnott and Knightley broke up after two years together.
