= Peter Hewitt (director) =

English film director

- Born: 9 October 1962 (age 64); Brighton, East Sussex, England
- Other name: Pete Hewitt
- Occupation: Film director
- Years active: 1989–present

Peter Hewitt (born 9 October 1962) is an English film director and writer.

== Career ==
Upon graduating from the National Film and Television School in 1990, Hewitt flew to the United States with his BAFTA award-winning short film, The Candy Show, in hand. Once there, he called executives from major Hollywood studios and asked if he could show them his film. Soon after, he landed an agent and made his feature film directorial debut with Bill & Ted's Bogus Journey (1991). Although not as big a success as the original, Bill & Ted's Excellent Adventure (1989), the movie made a profit.

He turned to TV next, directing the first two hours of the miniseries Wild Palms. He directed Disney's Tom and Huck in 1995 which was based on Mark Twain's The Adventures of Tom Sawyer. Hewitt returned to the U.K. to film The Borrowers, loosely based on a series of children's novels by Mary Norton. He remained in England to direct Whatever Happened to Harold Smith? (1999), then tried his hand at TV work again with The Princess of Thieves (2001), filmed in Romania but featuring a mostly British cast, including a young Keira Knightley as Robin Hood's daughter, Gwyn.

Hewitt co-wrote the script for his next film, Thunderpants, which was filmed in the U.K. Hewitt later went on to direct a few other movies, most notably the 2004 film adaptation of the comic strip Garfield and the 2006 Tim Allen superhero comedy film Zoom (the latter of which was a massive box office flop, only being able to recoup $12.5 million of its $75.6 million budget). More recently, he directed Home Alone 5: The Holiday Heist, which was produced for television, first aired on ABC Family (now Freeform) in 2012, and never received a theatrical release, but it was released on DVD in 2013.

== Filmography ==
=== Film ===
Year	Title	Director	Writer	Producer	Notes
1989	The Candy Show	Yes	Yes	No	BAFTA Award for Best Short Film
1991	Bill & Ted's Bogus Journey	Yes	No	No	As Pete Hewitt
1995	Tom and Huck	Yes	No	No	
1997	The Borrowers	Yes	No	No	
1999	Whatever Happened to Harold Smith?	Yes	No	No	
2002	Thunderpants	Yes	Story	Yes	as Pete Hewitt
2004	Garfield: The Movie	Yes	No	No	as Pete Hewitt
2004	Thunderbirds	No	Story	No	
2006	Zoom	Yes	No	No	
2009	The Maiden Heist	Yes	No	Executive	
2009	I Want Candy	No	Yes	No	
2014	Mostly Ghostly: Have You Met My Ghoulfriend?	Yes	No	No	Direct-to-video
2019	Surprise	Yes	Yes	Yes	

=== Television ===
Year	Title	Notes
1993	Wild Palms	Mini-series, 1 episode
1996	Tales from the Crypt	Episode "Confession"
2001	Princess of Thieves	TV movie
2012	Home Alone: The Holiday Heist	TV movie
2018	Christmas at the Palace	TV movie

== Trivia ==
His paternal cousin Simon Hewitt was a longtime animatronic designer for Jim Henson's Creature Shop in London until it permanently closed in 2005.
