= Philip of Cognac =

12th-century illegitimate son of King Richard I of England

- Lord
- Known for: Illegitimate son of Richard I of England
- Born: Philip Fitz Richard c. 1180
- Died: after 1211
- Residence: Charente, Poitou-Charentes, France
- Spouse: Amelia of Cognac
- Parents: Richard I of England

Philip of Cognac (early 1180s – after 1211) was an illegitimate son of King Richard I of England, by an unidentified mother.

== Life ==
Philip had reached adulthood by the end of the 1190s. His father married him to his ward, Amelia, the heiress of Cognac, France, in Charente. However, when she died without issue, Richard kept the castle, and handed it over to his seneschal, Robert of Thornham.

The king was mortally wounded during the suppression of a revolt by Viscount Aimar V of Limoges in 1199, and died without legitimate heirs. The chronicler Roger of Howden claimed that later that same year:

"Philip, illegitimate son of King Richard of England, to whom the aforesaid king his father had granted the castle and honour of Cognac, slew the previously mentioned Viscount of Limoges in vengeance for his father."

No other source corroborates this, or explicitly indicates that Aimar of Limoges's death was a violent one. However, Guiraut de Bornelh's planh (lament) for him, Planc e sospir, does suggest his death was unexpected.

A further reference to Philip is found in the pipe rolls for 1201 of his uncle, John, King of England: "Et Philippo f. R. Ricardi L m. de dono R." ("And to Philip, son of King Richard, fifty marks as a gift"), but little is known afterwards.

== In fiction ==
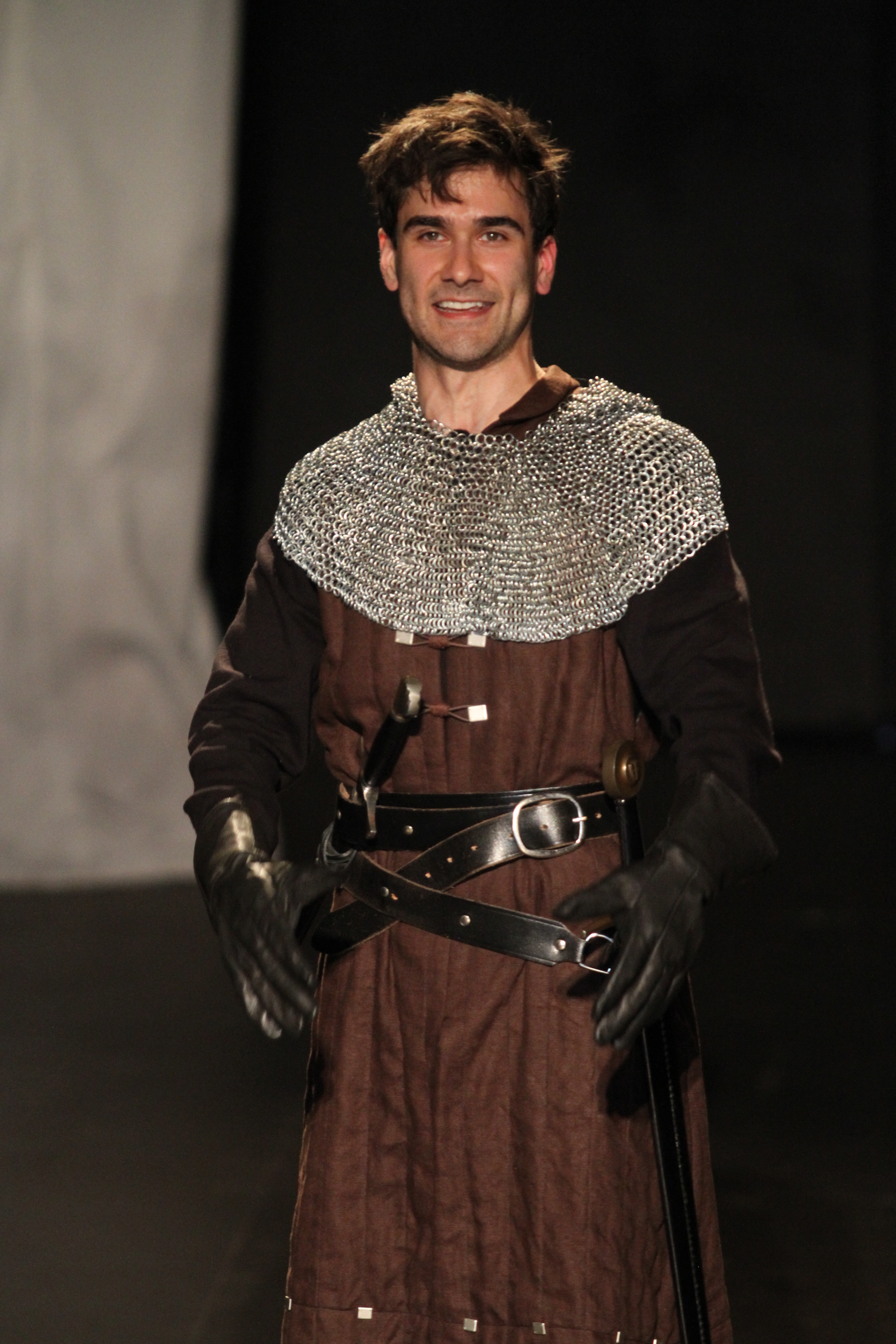
Aslam Husain as Philip the Bastard in the 2012 Bard on the Beach production of King John

William Shakespeare depicted Philip of Cognac as "Philip the Bastard" in his play, The Life and Death of King John (mid-1590s). In this, he is the son of Lady Faulconbridge, widow of Sir Robert Faulconbridge, and learns of his true paternity in the first scene:

Madam, I would not wish a better father.
He that perforce robs lions of their hearts
May easily win a woman's.

In reality, Philip's mother is not known.

Another highly fictionalised version of Philip, played by Stephen Moyer, figures as the romantic hero of Princess of Thieves (2001), a made-for-TV Disney adventure for young viewers, in which Keira Knightley plays Gwyn, the daughter of Robin Hood. This follows the tradition, begun by John Mair and popularised by Walter Scott, of assigning the Hood legends to Richard's reign. In this, Robin Hood, his daughter and the outlaws help Philip win the throne from his uncle, Prince John, and Philip and Gwyn fall in love.

== Sources ==
- "Comptes d'Alfonse de Poitiers" in Archives historiques du Poitou, vol. 4 (Poitiers, 1872) (available via external link to Gallica).
- John Gillingham, Richard Cœur de Lion: Kingship, Chivalry and War in the Twelfth Century (London, 1994).
- John Gillingham, Richard I (Yale, 1999).
- Hanley, Catherine (2022). Two Houses, Two Kingdoms: A History of France and England, 1100-1300. Yale University Press.374
- Oliver de Laborderie, "L'image de Richard Cœur de Lion dans La Vie et la Mort du roi Jean de William Shakespeare", in Janet L. Nelson (ed.) Richard Cœur de Lion in History and Myth (London, 1992).
- Pryde, E. B., ed. (2003). Handbook of British Chronology (5th ed.). Cambridge University Press.36-37
- Pipe Roll for the Third Year of the Reign of King John.
- Roger of Howden (ed. William Stubbs), Chronica, 4 vols. (London, 1868–71) (available via external link to Gallica).
