= Deflation (film) =

2001 short film

- Directed by: Roger Ashton-Griffiths
- Written by: Roger Ashton-Griffiths
- Starring: Del Synnott; Keira Knightley
- Release date: 2001
- Running time: 3 minutes
- Language: English

Deflation is a 2001 micro-budget short film, written and directed by Roger Ashton-Griffiths. It stars Del Synnott, features Keira Knightley, who also worked as part of the crew, and Sharman Macdonald, her mother, who co-edited the film.
