= Furness College, Lancaster =

Constituent college of the University of Lancaster

Coordinates: 54.00949°N 2.78543°W

Furness College
- Lancaster University
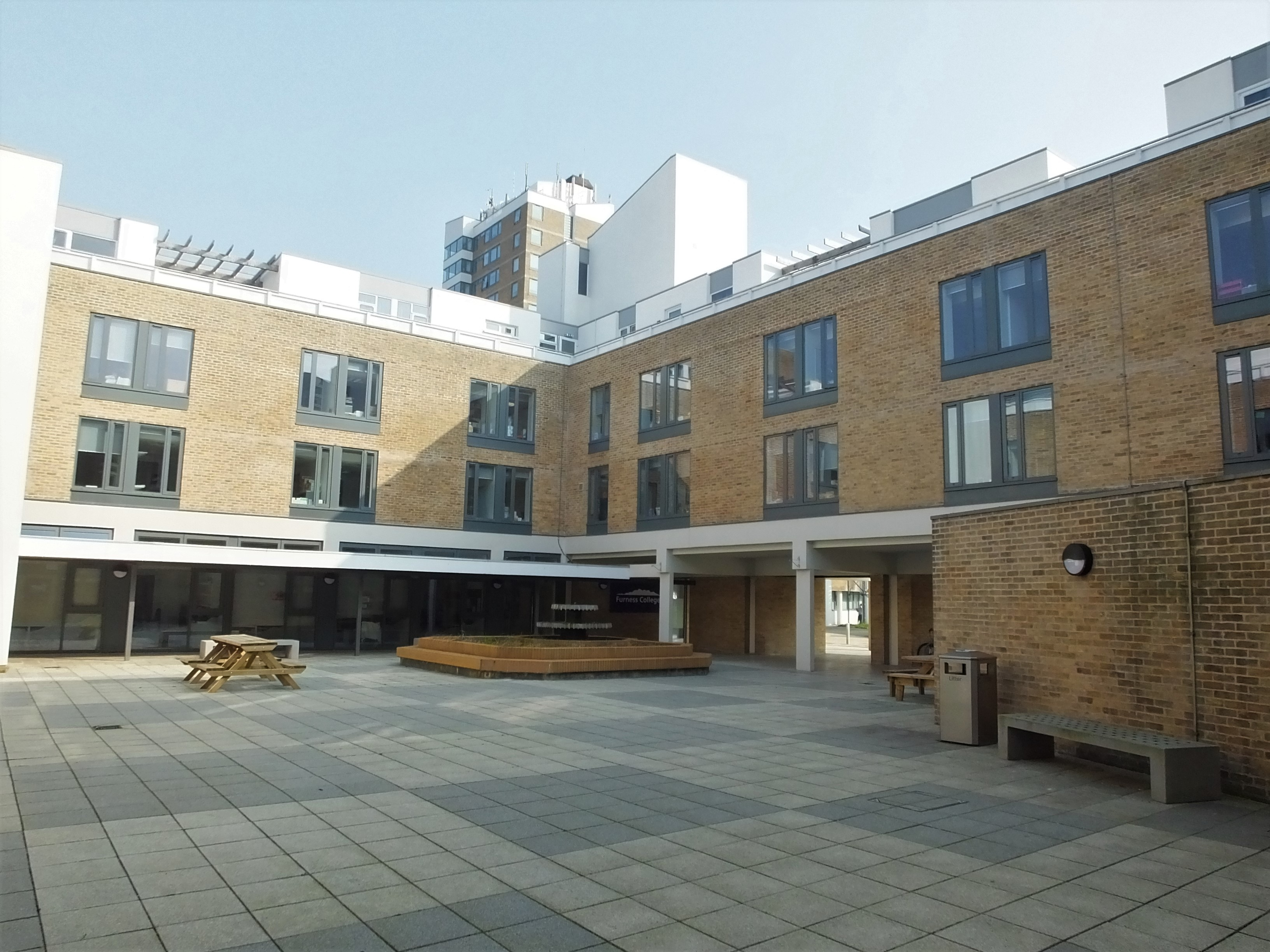
- Lancaster University, Furness College Quadrangle
- Motto: Everywhere else is nowhere
- Established: 1968
- Named for: Furness Region
- Colours: Purple; Silver
- Principal: Dr James Mawdesley
- JCR President: Taya Hodges
- JCR Vice Presidents: Megan Ward; JP Smith Mcgloin; Gabriel Vandvik
- Dean: Natalie Miller
- Undergraduates: 1500
- Newspaper: Trev's Times (pending return)
- Website: Furness College

Furness College is the fifth college of Lancaster University. Planning of the college started in 1966 when a 12-person planning committee chaired by Professor Reynolds (founding dean of Furness) was established to design the buildings and faculties of the college. The committee worked for two years and the college was officially opened in 1968. The main college building occupies a central location on the campus, being just to the south of Alexandra Square. The college's latest rejuvenation occurred in the 2011–2012 academic year, which included a substantial redevelopment of the building interior to accommodate both the college and the Faculty of Health and Medicine. The college is named after the Furness area, part of the Duchy of Lancaster and the historic county of Lancashire.

== Trevor ==
Trevor, the college bar, was previously named Furness Bar but was renamed following refurbishments in the 1980s after a vote by the members of the college. Trevor specialises in real ale and has appeared in the CAMRA Good Beer Guide. The bar is also generally the venue for college social events, various campus societies and a wine club which is headed by the college wine steward.

The college bar is also known for hosting a weekly quiz, known as Trev Quiz, every Thursday ran by the JCR Executive, and a bi-termly Treveoke (karaoke). Student and local bands are often invited to perform for events held within Trevor.

== Symbols ==
The Furness College motto is Everywhere else is nowhere, summing up the social and community reputation of the college. Following a major branding exercise by the university in 2008, the college's long-standing colours of purple and silver were officially adopted, replacing the often used red, orange, black and white. The logo was also re-drawn in line with the university wide re-branding of the colleges.

The Alma Mater song of Furness College is "Angels" by Robbie Williams.

== Residence blocks ==
The college residences are named after villages, houses or fells in the Furness region. The nine original residence blocks were demolished in August 2004 to make way for site redevelopment with much larger ensuite buildings. The original buildings were named Dalton, Colton, Aldingham, Hawkshead, Pennington, Kirkby-Ireleth, Ulverston, Urswick and Lowick. The five houses named Furness Perimeter were constructed in 1992. Furness Central re-used the names of four of the original buildings when the new buildings opened in September 2006. Furness Perimeter are designated as upgraded standard by the university, whilst Furness Central are superior ensuite. Further development was completed prior to the 2023-24 academic year to transform the top two floors of Furness Main to host both undergraduate and mature students.

Furness Perimeter: (192 bedspaces)

- Greenodd
- Bardsea
- Brantwood
- Torver
- Wetherlam

Furness Central: (347 bedspaces)

- Aldingham
- Colton
- Hawkshead
- Pennington

== Governance ==
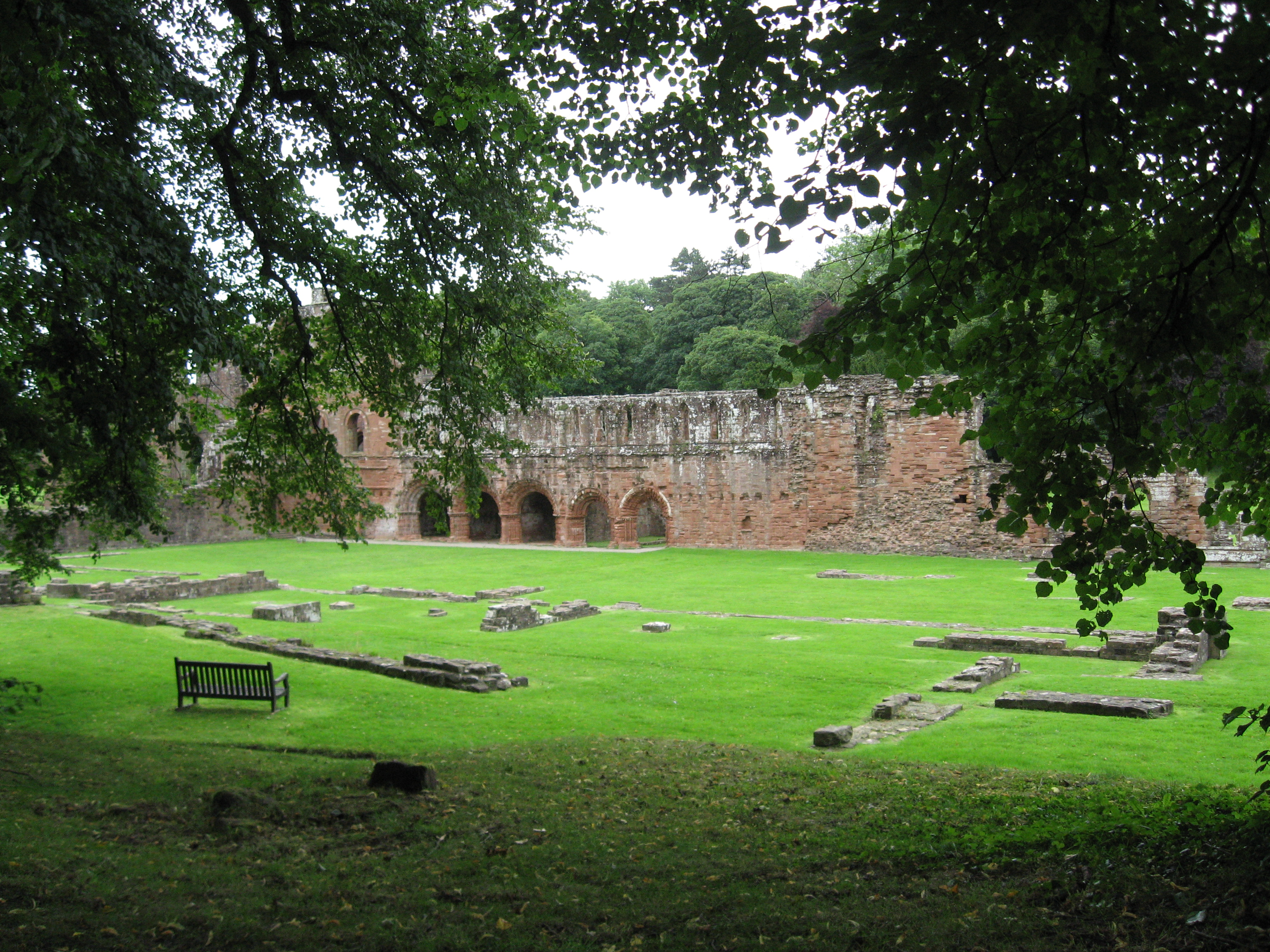
Furness Abbey or St Mary of Furness is a former Cistercian monastery situated on the outskirts of Barrow-in-Furness

The College Syndicate is the body charged by the charter of the university with the good governance of the college. University Council appoints, on the recommendation of the College Syndicate, the principal of the college. Other college officers, for example the Senior Tutor and Dean, are elected directly by the Syndicate. The syndicate elects a senior member of college to the University Senate for a three-year term and two members to the University Court for three years, once re-newable. Unusually for a Lancaster college, no members of the JCR are co-opted to the syndicate.

The Furness College Council is responsible for the day-to-day running of the college. It comprises the principal and vice-principal; ten officers of the Senior Common Room who manage the tutorial system, the deanery, the residences, social life and the college office; and thirteen members of the JCR Executive who manage undergraduate affairs. The council meets once each academic term.

== Student Life ==
=== Sports ===
Furness College has multiple college sports teams, including in football, netball and bar sports. In 2024, the Furness JCR Exec won the LUSU Best Sporting Initiative for their advancements in women's+ football, aiming to create a full 11-a-side cross-collegiate women's+ league by the end of the academic year. There have also been talks to expand the college sports to include tennis.

Akin to other rivalries at Lancaster, Furness has a collegiate rivalry with Cartmel College in which they compete annually during Lent term for the Patriots Cup. Furness won in 2026, having won for five consecutive years.

=== Socials ===
The college puts on multiple events throughout the year, ranging from sober to drinking events. On campus, the college hosts a weekly pub quiz within the college bar, called Trev Quiz, and weekly movie nights in the college TV room, while off-campus, the college hosts a bi-annual themed 15-Hour Bar Crawl and an annual Winter Ball. These events are all ran by and managed by the JCR Exec.

Until the 2022-23 academic year, the college also hosted an end-of-year party known as Extrav, hosted during the Summer Term, which consisted of collegiate activities and live bands. This was later replaced with the LUSU Summer Ball, which hosts all nine colleges.

=== Wellbeing Initiatives ===
In 2024, the Furness JCR VP Wellbeing Officer, Leah Buttery, won the LUSU Best Wellbeing Initiative for 'Free Flow', a campaign that she, alongside 2 other Lancaster University students, ran to provide free sanitary products for all bathrooms across campus.

== Notable alumni ==
- Roger Ashton-Griffiths, Actor, Screenwriter and Director
- Alan Campbell, MP for Tynemouth
- David Favis-Mortlock, Environmental Change Institute, University of Oxford
- Ralph Ineson, Actor
- Jon Moulton, Founder of Better Capital
