= List of awards and nominations received by Keira Knightley =

Keira Knightley awards and nominations
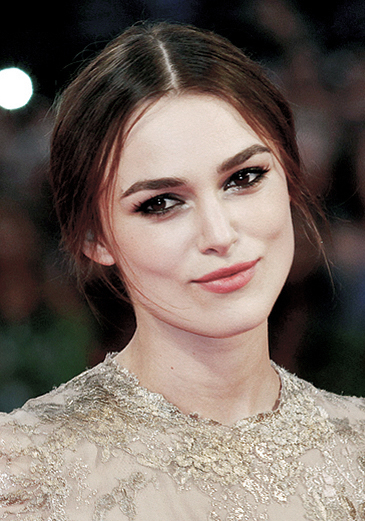
- Knightley at the 2011 Venice Film Festival
Awards and nominations
Award	Wins	Nominations
Academy Awards	0	2
British Academy Film Awards	0	2
Golden Globe Awards	0	4
Screen Actors Guild Awards	0	2
Empire Awards	2	8
Laurence Olivier Awards	0	1
Teen Choice Awards	7	10

Totals (Note: Certain award groups do not simply award one winner. They acknowledge several different recipients, have runners-up, and have third place. Since this is a specific recognition and is different from losing an award, runner-up mentions are considered wins in this award tally. For simplification and to avoid errors, each award in this list has been presumed to have had a prior nomination.)
- Wins: 24
- Nominations: 94

Keira Knightley is an English actress who has received numerous awards including nominations for two Academy Awards, two British Academy Film Awards, four Golden Globe Awards, two Screen Actors Guild Awards and one Laurence Olivier Award.

Knightley made her breakthrough with the 2002 sports comedy-drama film Bend It Like Beckham, for which she won the London Film Critics' Circle Award for Best Newcomer. She would go on to received Academy Award nominations for Best Actress for playing Elizabeth Bennet in the period romance Pride & Prejudice (2005) and Best Supporting Actress for her portrayal of Joan Clarke in the historical drama The Imitation Game (2014). At age 20-year-old Knightley became the third-youngest Best Actress nominee at the time for the former. She starred alongside James McAvoy in the romantic war drama Atonement (2007) and gained her first nomination for a BAFTA Award for Best Actress in a Leading Role.

On stage, Knightley starred as a flirtatious young woman Célimène who is being courted by several men in Martin Crimp's comedic West End production of The Misanthrope (2009), which earned her a nomination for a Laurence Olivier Award for Best Actress in a Supporting Role in a Play in 2010. On television, Knightley starred in the Netflix British spy thriller Black Doves (2024) earning nominations for the Golden Globe Award for Best Actress – Television Series Drama and the Critics' Choice Television Award for Best Actress in a Drama Series.

== Major associations ==
=== Academy Awards ===
Year	Category	Nominated work	Result	Ref.
2005	Best Actress	Pride and Prejudice	Nominated	
2014	Best Supporting Actress	The Imitation Game	Nominated	

=== BAFTA Awards ===
Year	Category	Nominated work	Result	Ref.
British Academy Film Awards
2007	Best Actress in a Leading Role	Atonement	Nominated	
2014	Best Actress in a Supporting Role	The Imitation Game	Nominated	

=== Critics' Choice Awards ===
Year	Category	Nominated work	Result	Ref.
Critics' Choice Awards
2005	Best Actress	Pride and Prejudice	Nominated	
2014	Best Acting Ensemble (Note: Shared with the cast.)	The Imitation Game	Nominated	
2014	Best Supporting Actress	The Imitation Game	Nominated	
2014	Best Song	"Lost Stars" (from Begin Again)	Nominated	
Critics' Choice Television Awards
2025	Best Actress in a Drama Series	Black Doves	Nominated	

=== Golden Globe Awards ===
Year	Category	Nominated work	Result	Ref.
2005	Best Actress in a Motion Picture – Musical or Comedy	Pride and Prejudice	Nominated	
2007	Best Actress in a Motion Picture – Drama	Atonement	Nominated	
2014	Best Supporting Actress – Motion Picture	The Imitation Game	Nominated	
2024	Best Actress – Television Series Drama	Black Doves	Nominated	

=== Screen Actors Guild Awards ===
Year	Category	Nominated work	Result	Ref.
2014	Outstanding Cast in a Motion Picture	The Imitation Game	Nominated	
2014	Outstanding Actress in a Supporting Role	The Imitation Game	Nominated	

=== Laurence Olivier Awards ===
Year	Category	Nominated work	Result	Ref.
2010	Best Actress in a Supporting Role	The Misanthrope	Nominated	

== Miscellaneous awards ==
Organizations	Year	Category	Work	Result	Ref.
AACTA International Awards	2014	Best Supporting Actress	The Imitation Game	Nominated	
Australian Film Institute	2014	Best Supporting Actress	The Imitation Game	Nominated	
British Independent Film Awards	2005	Variety Award	Herself	Won	
British Independent Film Awards	2008	Best Actress	The Duchess	Nominated	
British Independent Film Awards	2010	Best Supporting Actress	Never Let Me Go	Nominated	
British Independent Film Awards	2014	Best Actress	The Imitation Game	Nominated	
Empire Awards	2002	Best Newcomer	The Hole	Nominated	
Empire Awards	2003	Best British Actress	Pirates of the Caribbean: The Curse of the Black Pearl	Nominated	
Empire Awards	2004	Best British Actress	King Arthur	Nominated	
Empire Awards	2005	Best Actress	Pride and Prejudice	Nominated	
Empire Awards	2006	Best Actress	Pirates of the Caribbean: Dead Man's Chest	Nominated	
Empire Awards	2007	Best Actress	Atonement	Won	
Empire Awards	2011	Empire Hero Award	Herself	Won	
Empire Awards	2014	Best Actress	The Imitation Game	Nominated	
Evening Standard Theatre Awards	2010	Best Actress in a Leading Role in a Play	The Misanthrope	Nominated	
European Film Awards	2012	European Actress	Anna Karenina	Nominated	
Harper's Bazaar Women of the Year	2016	Theater Icon Award	Herself	Won	
Harper's Bazaar Women of the Year	2018	British Actress of the Year	Colette	Won	
Hollywood Film Awards	2014	Best Supporting Actress	The Imitation Game	Won	
Irish Film & Television Academy	2003	Best International Actress	Pirates of the Caribbean: The Curse of the Black Pearl	Won	
Jupiter Award	2014	Best International Actress	Begin Again	Won	
Kids' Choice Awards	2007	Favorite Female Movie Star	Pirates of the Caribbean: Dead Man's Chest	Nominated	
Kids' Choice Awards	2008	Favorite Movie Actress	Pirates of the Caribbean: At World's End	Nominated	
MTV Movie Awards	2003	Best Breakthrough Performance – Female	Pirates of the Caribbean: The Curse of the Black Pearl	Nominated	
MTV Movie Awards	2006	Best Performance	Pirates of the Caribbean: Dead Man's Chest	Nominated	
Palm Springs International Film Festival	2014	Ensemble Cast	The Imitation Game	Won	
People's Choice Awards	2006	Favorite On-Screen Match-Up (Note: Shared with Johnny Depp)	Pirates of the Caribbean: Dead Man's Chest	Won	
People's Choice Awards	2007	Favorite Female Action Star	Pirates of the Caribbean: At World's End	Won	
People's Choice Awards	2008	Favorite Female Movie Star	The Duchess	Nominated	
People's Choice Awards	2014	Favorite Dramatic Movie Actress	The Imitation Game	Nominated	
Satellite Awards	2005	Best Actress – Drama	Pride and Prejudice	Nominated	
Satellite Awards	2012	Best Actress – Motion Picture	Anna Karenina	Nominated	
Satellite Awards	2014	Best Supporting Actress – Motion Picture	The Imitation Game	Nominated	
Saturn Awards	2003	Best Supporting Actress	Pirates of the Caribbean: The Curse of the Black Pearl	Nominated	
Saturn Awards	2010	Best Supporting Actress	Never Let Me Go	Nominated	
Saturn Awards	2010	Best Supporting Actress	A Dangerous Method	Nominated	
Teen Choice Awards	2004	Choice Movie: Chemistry (Note: Shared with Orlando Bloom)	Pirates of the Caribbean: The Curse of the Black Pearl	Won	
Teen Choice Awards	2004	Choice Movie: Liplock	Pirates of the Caribbean: The Curse of the Black Pearl	Won	
Teen Choice Awards	2005	Choice Movie Actress: Action	King Arthur	Nominated	
Teen Choice Awards	2006	Choice Movie Actress: Action/Drama	Pride and Prejudice	Nominated	
Teen Choice Awards	2006	Choice Movie: Hissy Fit	Pirates of the Caribbean: Dead Man's Chest	Won	
Teen Choice Awards	2006	Choice Movie: Liplock	Pirates of the Caribbean: Dead Man's Chest	Won	
Teen Choice Awards	2006	Choice Movie: Scream	Pirates of the Caribbean: Dead Man's Chest	Won	
Teen Choice Awards	2006	Choice Movie Actress: Action/Drama	Pirates of the Caribbean: Dead Man's Chest	Nominated	
Teen Choice Awards	2007	Choice Movie Actress: Action	Pirates of the Caribbean: At World's End	Won	
Teen Choice Awards	2008	Choice Movie Actress: Drama	Atonement	Won	
Teen Choice Awards	2017	Choice: Lip Lock	Pirates of the Caribbean: Dead Men Tell No Tales	Nominated	
Teen Choice Awards	2019	Choice Movie: Actress Sci-Fi/Fantasy	The Nutcracker and the Four Realms	Nominated	
Visual Effects Society Awards	2003	Outstanding Actor in an Effects Film	Pirates of the Caribbean: The Curse of the Black Pearl	Nominated	

== Critics awards ==
Organizations	Year	Category	Work	Result	Ref.
Alliance of Women Film Journalists	2012	Best Depiction of Nudity, Sexuality, or Seduction (Note: Shared with Aaron Taylor-Johnson)	Anna Karenina	Nominated	
Alliance of Women Film Journalists	2012	Most Egregious Age Difference Between the Leading Man and the Love Interest (Note: Shared with Steve Carell)	Seeking a Friend for the End of the World	Nominated	
Central Ohio Film Critics Association	2014	Best Supporting Actress	The Imitation Game	Nominated	
Chicago Film Critics Association	2005	Best Actress	Pride and Prejudice	Nominated	
Dallas–Fort Worth Film Critics Association	2005	Best Actress	Pride & Prejudice	Runner-up	
Dallas–Fort Worth Film Critics Association	2014	Best Supporting Actress	The Imitation Game	Nominated	
Houston Film Critics Society	2014	Best Supporting Actress	The Imitation Game	Nominated	
London Film Critics' Circle Awards	2003	Best Newcomer (Note: Tied with Martin Compston)	Bend It Like Beckham	Won	
London Film Critics' Circle Awards	2005	British Actress of the Year	Pride and Prejudice	Nominated	
London Film Critics' Circle Awards	2014	British Actress of the Year	Begin Again / The Imitation Game / Laggies	Nominated	
National Society of Film Critics	2005	Best Actress	Pride and Prejudice	Runner-up	
North Carolina Film Critics Association	2014	Best Supporting Actress	The Imitation Game	Nominated	
Online Film Critics Society	2003	Best Breakthrough Performance	Bend It Like Beckham	Won	
Online Film Critics Society	2006	Best Actress	Pride and Prejudice	Nominated	
Phoenix Film Critics Society	2014	Best Supporting Actress	The Imitation Game	Nominated	
San Diego Film Critics Society	2014	Best Ensemble	The Imitation Game	Nominated	
San Diego Film Critics Society	2014	Best Supporting Actress	The Imitation Game	Nominated	
St. Louis Film Critics Association	2014	Best Supporting Actress	The Imitation Game	Nominated	
Washington D.C. Area Film Critics Association	2003	Best Ensemble	Love Actually	Won	
Washington D.C. Area Film Critics Association	2006	Best Actress	Pride and Prejudice	Nominated	
Women Film Critics Circle	2019	Best Actress	Official Secrets	Nominated	
Women Film Critics Circle	2019	Best Female Action Hero	Official Secrets	Nominated	
Women Film Critics Circle	2019	Best Screen Couple (Note: Shared with Adam Bakri)	Official Secrets	Nominated	

== Honorary awards ==
Organizations	Year	Award	Result	Ref.
Harper's Bazaar	2016	Theater Icon Award	Honored	
Elle Magazine	2018	Woman of the Year Award	Honored	
Queen Elizabeth II	2018	Officer of the Order of the British Empire (OBE)	Honored	

== See also ==
- List of British actors
- List of British Academy Award nominees and winners
- List of oldest and youngest Academy Award winners and nominees – Youngest nominees for Best Actress in a Leading Role
- List of actors with Academy Award nominations
- List of actors with two or more Academy Award nominations in acting categories
- List of Keira Knightley performances
