= Whatever Happened to Harold Smith? =

- Directed by: Peter Hewitt
- Written by: Ben Steiner
- Produced by: David Brown; Ruth Jackson
- Starring: Tom Courtenay; Michael Legge; Lulu; Laura Fraser; Stephen Fry
- Cinematography: David Tattersall
- Edited by: Martin Walsh
- Music by: Harry Gregson-Williams
- Production companies: Intermedia Films; October Films; West Eleven Films
- Distributed by: Universal Pictures (through United International Pictures)
- Release dates: 13 November 1999 (London Film Festival); 10 March 2000 (United Kingdom)
- Running time: 95 minutes
- Country: United Kingdom
- Language: English

Whatever Happened to Harold Smith? is a 1999 British comedy film directed by Peter Hewitt and written by Ben Steiner. It was filmed in Doncaster and Sheffield.

The cult classic film is a love story set in the 1970s, showing Vince Smith's efforts to date his office colleague Joanna Robinson. Vince attempts to get her to join him at the local disco, but unbeknown to him, Joanna is a punk. This happens against a backdrop of Vince's father Harold becoming a minor celebrity due to his psychic powers, essentially forms of mind reading and telekinesis.

== Cast ==
- Tom Courtenay as Harold Smith
- Michael Legge as Vincent Smith
- Lulu as Irene Smith
- Laura Fraser as Joanna Robinson
- Stephen Fry as Dr. Peter Robinson
- Charlotte Roberts as Lucy Robinson
- Amanda Root as Margaret Robinson
- David Thewlis as Nesbit
- Charlie Hunnam as Daz
- James Corden as Walter

== Release ==
The film opened in the United Kingdom on 10 March 2000 in 207 cinemas and grossed £137,309 in its opening weekend, placing ninth at the UK box office.

This film has been released on VHS but has never been released on DVD or streaming.
