= Princess of Thieves =

Adventure film

- North American DVD release
- Written by: Robin Lerner
- Directed by: Peter Hewitt
- Starring: Stuart Wilson; Stephen Moyer; Keira Knightley; Jonathan Hyde; Malcolm McDowell
- Composer: Rupert Gregson-Williams
- Countries of origin: United Kingdom; United States
- Original language: English

Production
- Producer: Jon Cowan
- Running time: 88 minutes
- Production company: Granada Entertainment USA

Original release
- Network: Disney, ABC
- Release: 11 March 2001

Princess of Thieves is a 2001 romantic adventure television film starring Keira Knightley, produced by Granada Entertainment USA; it premiered on ABC's The Wonderful World of Disney in the United States in 2001.

Co-starring in the film are Stuart Wilson as Robin Hood, Stephen Moyer as Prince Philip, Jonathan Hyde as Prince John and Malcolm McDowell as the Sheriff. The movie was directed by Peter Hewitt and filmed in Romania. The film's plotline draws inspiration from the classic Robin Hood legend, which has been adapted many times for screen.

== Plot ==
Years after the "known" events of the Robin Hood legend, Robin's daughter, Gwyn, has grown up to be a strong-willed young woman, with a talent for archery, much like her father. As Maid Marian has died and Robin Hood is perpetually away battling in the Crusades, Gwyn has lived much of her life alone. Her only friend is the sweet but plain Froderick (Del Synnott), who clearly is in love with her. Upon the death of King Richard the Lionheart, Robin returns to see that the proper man takes Richard's place as King of England. Robin is quickly foiled and imprisoned by his enemies, the Sheriff of Nottingham and Prince John.

It is then up to Gwyn to save the day. She must complete Robin's mission to find and protect the young Prince Philip (Stephen Moyer), who has just returned from exile in France to claim the throne – not an easy task since he has decided to forsake his true identity and is travelling anonymously under his valet's name (who died en route protecting his prince). Though she does fortuitously cross paths with the prince, she is not aware of his identity. With a romantic spark budding between them, they must find the Merry Men and join forces to free her father from the tortures of the Tower of London before the evil Prince John ascends to the throne and brings England to ruin. After freeing her father, Gwyn along with her father and Prince Philip stop the coronation of Prince John.

When Philip is about to be crowned as king, Gwyn with a heavy heart tells him that she can only serve and work for him, and they cannot be together. Robin later explains that he stayed out of Gwyn's life to protect her from the life he leads, but it did not make any difference because she grew up to be just like him. He then proposes a partnership between the two of them to serve Philip, with the only condition being that she take her orders from him (Robin) alone. She agrees, and at the end they are seen together leading Robin's men, side by side.

== Cast ==
- Keira Knightley as Gwyn, the daughter of Robin Hood and Maid Marian
- Stephen Moyer as Prince Philip, the illegitimate son of King Richard the Lionheart
- Stuart Wilson as Robin Hood
- Del Synnott as Froderick, a young man who has grown up with Gwyn; he is studying to be a churchman
- Malcolm McDowell as Sheriff of Nottingham, Robin Hood's mortal enemy
- Jonathan Hyde as Prince John, King Richard's younger brother, who attempts to steal the throne of England
- Crispin Letts as Will Scarlet, Robin Hood's loyal friend and companion
- Roger Ashton-Griffiths as Friar Tuck
- Hannah Cresswell as Maid Marian, the mother of Gwyn and the narrator of the film

=== Production credits ===
- Director as Peter Hewitt
- Executive Producers as Susan B. Landau, Robert Rovner, Jon Cowan and Antony Root
- Art Director as Cristian Niculescu
- Second Unit Director as Mary Soan
- Composer (Music Score) as Rupert Gregson-Williams
- Editor as Sue Wyatt
- Producer as Bill Leather
- Production Designer as Chris Roope
- Screenwriter as Robin Lerner
- Costume Designer as Oana Paunescu

== Reception ==
Scott Weinberg of eFilmCritic.com gave the film 4 stars, and wrote: "Princess of Thieves bucks all the odds by turning out to be an entertaining little movie." Nix of BeyondHollywood.com was unexpectedly bored by the film despite expecting to like it; she concluded "The movie was made for a targeted audience – teen girls under 12 – and everyone else will be bored by it."

== See also ==
- List of films and television series featuring Robin Hood
