= Thunderpants =

2002 family film directed by Peter Hewitt

- Theatrical release poster
- Directed by: Pete Hewitt
- Screenplay by: Phil Hughes
- Story by: Pete Hewitt
- Produced by: Graham Broadbent; Damian Jones; Pete Hewitt
- Starring: Simon Callow; Stephen Fry; Celia Imrie; Paul Giamatti; Ned Beatty; Bruce Cook; Rupert Grint
- Cinematography: Andy Collins
- Edited by: Michael Parker
- Music by: Rupert Gregson-Williams
- Production companies: Pathé Pictures; Sky; The Film Council; Mission Pictures; CP Medien AG
- Distributed by: Pathé Distribution
- Release date: 24 May 2002
- Running time: 87 minutes
- Countries: United Kingdom; Germany
- Language: English
- Budget: $7 million
- Box office: $3 million

Thunderpants is a 2002 family absurdist comedy film about a boy whose incredible capacity for flatulence gets him a job as an astronaut. The film was directed by Pete Hewitt, and the script was written by Phil Hughes, based on a story by Pete Hewitt about a boy who dreams of being a spaceman, despite his chronic flatulence.

== Plot ==
Born with two stomachs, Patrick Smash is uncontrollably and devastatingly flatulent. No more than thirty seconds after his birth, he first breaks wind, horrifying his parents and doctor. As he grows up, Patrick's farts become so uncontrollable and destructive that his father has to flee their home, as he is often injured by his son's gaseous emissions, whose force is so strong that it can blow people over. Patrick is bullied at school as a result of his condition, but eventually finds strength in his disorder, ultimately gaining revenge on the school bully Damon by passing gas in his face, leaving him scarred for life.

Patrick's only friend is child prodigy Alan A. Allen, who has anosmia, and, therefore, lacks the ability to smell. Alan and Patrick team up to make Thunderpants, reinforced short trousers strong enough to contain Patrick's emissions.

One day, on the way to visit Alan, Patrick sees Alan being taken away in a mysterious black car; Alan's father informs Patrick that Alan will not be returning home soon. Patrick gets recruited by an opera singer to help him with his world tour; Patrick uses this as an opportunity to search for Alan, while on tour Patrick is arrested and convicted of murder. They sentence him to firing squad and he is nearly killed, then saved by US intelligence agents. Eventually, Patrick learns that Alan went to the US to help retrieve a group of astronauts who are trapped in outer space, and Patrick finds that his condition may be of use to the spacemen in peril.

== Cast ==
- Bruce Cook as Patrick Smash
- Rupert Grint as Alan A. Allen
- Simon Callow as Sir John Osgood
- Adam Godley as Placido P. Placeedo
- Stephen Fry as Sir Anthony Silk
- Celia Imrie as Miss Rapier
- Paul Giamatti as Johnson J. Johnson
- Ned Beatty as Gen. Ed Sheppard
- Bronagh Gallagher as Mrs Smash
- Victor McGuire as Mr Smash
- Anna Popplewell as Denise Smash
- Josh Herdman as Damon
- Leslie Phillips as Judge
- Robert Hardy as Doctor
- Devon Anderson as Dan
- Keira Knightley as Music School Student (uncredited in the cast list but appears in the "Special Thanks" list)
- Jonah Trenouth as Alan A. Allen (aged 5)

== Reception ==
The film has received a rating of 67% at the film review website Rotten Tomatoes, based upon 6 reviews.

Empire magazine wrote in their review that Thunderpants is "a well-made, quirky oddity for adults, but a laugh riot for kids and Beano nostalgists... underneath all the expelled air it's really just a simple tale of a boy finding his talent and making the most of it". During an appearance on The Tonight Show with Conan O'Brien, Paul Giamatti referred to this film as one of the high points in his career. In 2023, whilst promoting The Holdovers, Giamatti referred to Thunderpants as "brilliant" and "one of the most remarkable movies [he's] been in".
