= Coming Home (1998 serial) =

1998 British TV series

- DVD cover
- Genre: Period drama
- Based on: Coming Home by Rosamunde Pilcher
- Written by: John Goldsmith
- Directed by: Giles Foster
- Starring: Emily Mortimer; Peter O'Toole; Joanna Lumley
- Theme music composer: Carl Davis
- Country of origin: United Kingdom
- Original language: English
- No. of episodes: 2

Production
- Producer: Rikolt von Gagern
- Editor: Colin Green
- Running time: 202 minutes
- Production companies: Portman Entertainment; LWT

Original release
- Network: ITV
- Release: 12 April – 13 April 1998

Related
- Nancherrow

Coming Home is a 1998 British serial directed by Giles Foster. The teleplay by John Goldsmith is based on the 1995 novel of the same name by Rosamunde Pilcher. Produced by Portman Entertainment for LWT, it was broadcast in two parts by ITV from 12 to 13 April 1998.

== Plot ==
When her parents and younger sister Jess move to colonial Singapore, Judith Dunbar is enrolled in St. Ursula's, an English boarding school, where she makes friends with classmate Loveday Carey-Lewis. Loveday invites her to visit Nancherrow, Loveday's parents' magnificent Cornwall estate. Soon, she is spending more time at Nancherrow than with her legal guardian, Aunt Louise. When Aunt Louise is killed in an automobile accident, Judith inherits her considerable estate, meaning she can live as an independent woman for the rest of her life. She moves into Nancherrow permanently.

Judith is in love with Loveday's older brother Edward. Believing he loves her too, she has sex with him. When he makes it clear he has no interest in marriage, she packs her bag and leaves Nancherrow. A year later, World War II is in progress and Judith is a WREN. She meets Edward again and he proposes marriage but before she gives him an answer, Edward's plane is shot down. Blinded, he commits suicide rather than be a burden to others. When Loveday's fiancé Gus goes missing in action she believes he is dead, and marries her farmer friend, Walter.

On leave in London, Judith meets Jeremy Wells, a doctor who was a frequent visitor to Nancherrow. They make love that night, but Jeremy is posted overseas and they do not see each other for some time. He writes her a letter, declaring his love for her and asking if she will marry him after the war. When she does not reply, he assumes her answer is no—but in fact, the letter never arrived, having been lost in battle.

As the war ends, Judith anxiously seeks news of her family, who were caught in the Fall of Singapore. She learns that her father died in Changi in 1942, and that her sister has been found in Australia. When Judith collects Jess from the authorities, she is mute. Seeking help for Jess, Judith meets Jeremy, who is working in his father's general practice. He advises patience. Soon after, Judith has a breakthrough and Jess is able to tell her that their mother drowned when their ship was torpedoed. Jeremy comes to check on Jess and in conversation with Judith, discovers that she never received the letter. He declares his love and she accepts him joyously.

== Cast ==
- Keira Knightley (Part 1) / Emily Mortimer (Part 2) as Judith Dunbar
- Peter O'Toole as Colonel Edgar Carey-Lewis
- Joanna Lumley as Diana Carey-Lewis
- Poppy Gaye as Young Loveday (Part 1) / Katie Ryder Richardson as Loveday Carey-Lewis (Part 2)
- Penelope Keith as Aunt Louise
- David McCallum as Billy Fawcett
- Paul Bettany as Edward Carey-Lewis
- George Asprey as Dr. Jeremy Wells
- Heikko Deutschmann as Gus
- Patrick Ryecart as Tommy Mortimer
- Susan Hampshire as Miss Catto
- Brooke Kinsella as Jess

== Production ==
The serial was shot at numerous locations in Cornwall, including Godrevy, Lamorna, Lelant, Marazion, Penzance, Porthgwarra, Prideaux Place, and St Michael's Mount, as well as Wrotham Park in Hertfordshire.

== Home media ==
Acorn Media UK released the serial in fullscreen format on DVD on 28 March 2000. It includes excerpts from a documentary about Rosamunde Pilcher.
