= Roger Ashton-Griffiths =

English actor, screenwriter and film director

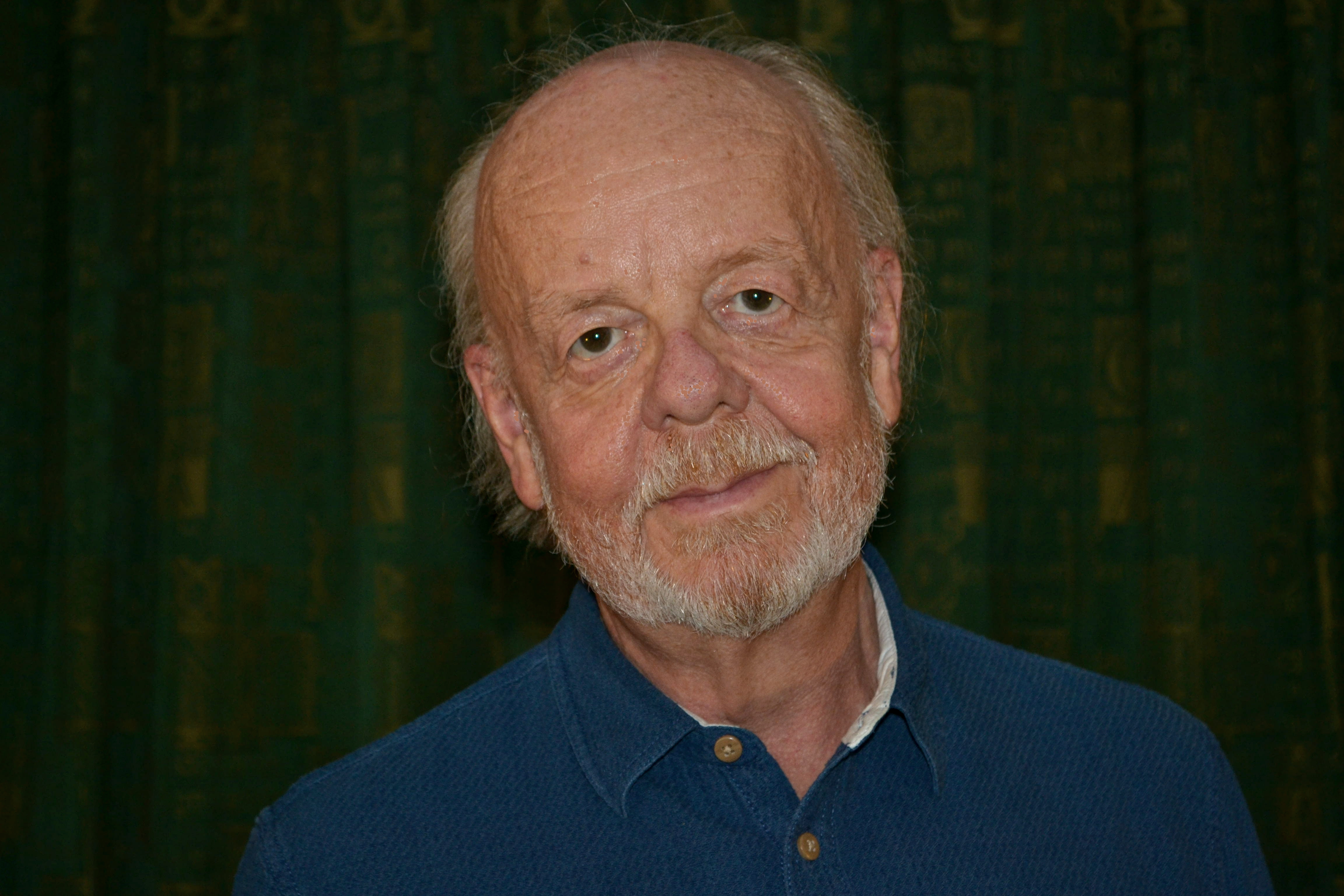
- Ashton-Griffiths in 2023
- Born: 19 January 1957 (age 69); Hertfordshire, England
- Education: Lancaster University (BMus 1978); University of East London (MA 2003); University of East Anglia (PhD 2016)
- Occupations: Actor, director, writer
- Years active: 1982–present
- Spouse: Sharmini Thillaimuthu
- Children: 2

Roger Ashton-Griffiths (born 19 January 1957) is an English character actor, screenwriter and film director. He is best known for his role as Mace Tyrell in the HBO fantasy series Game of Thrones.

== Life and career ==
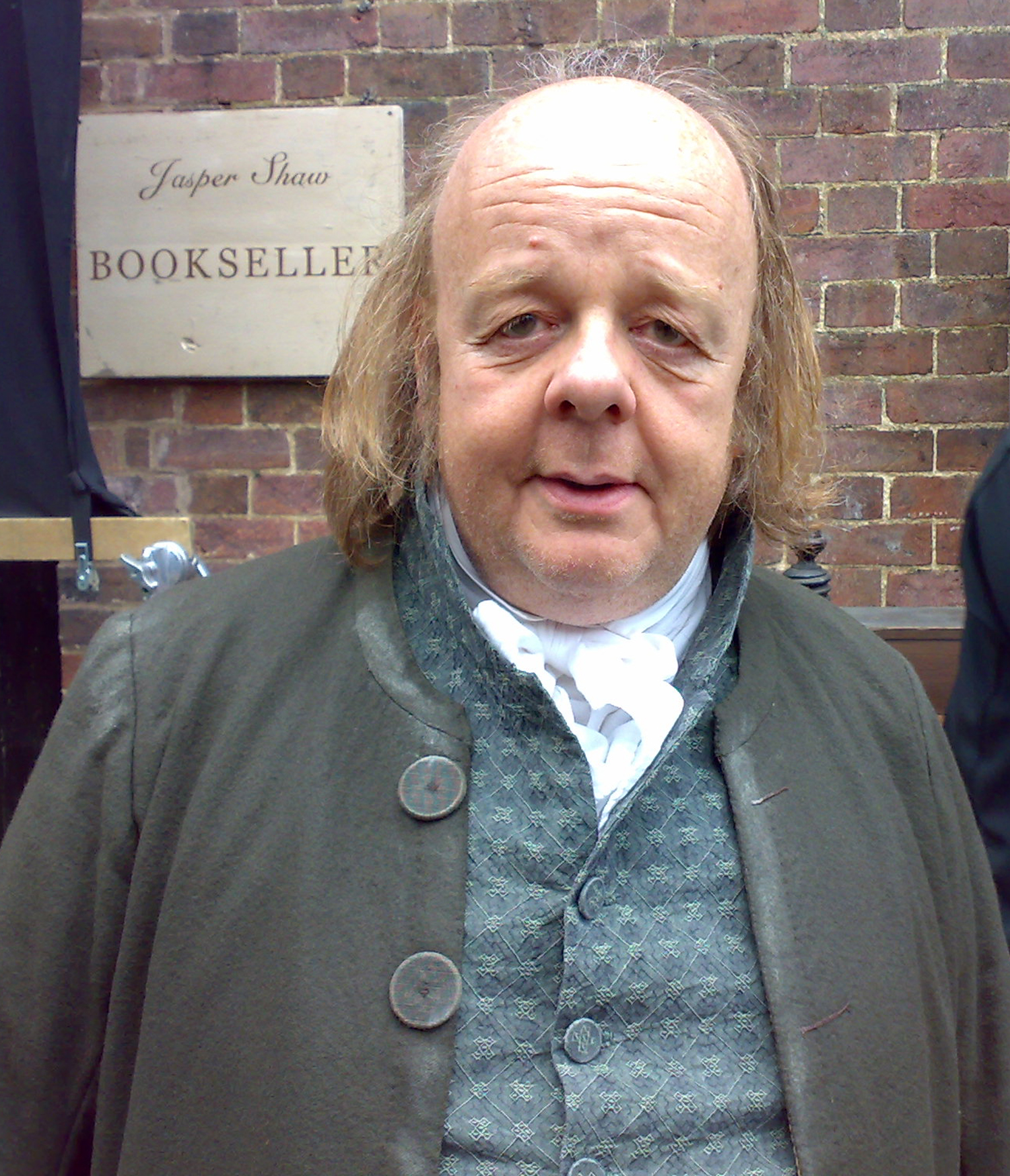
Ashton-Griffiths as Jasper Shaw, the bookseller, in Jane Campion's Bright Star (2008)

Born in Hertfordshire, Ashton-Griffiths attended Altrincham Grammar School for Boys in Manchester. He then read music at Lancaster University, where he was a member of Furness College, graduating in 1978. He began his career as a singer with the English National Opera at the London Coliseum between 1979 and 1981.

He has appeared in numerous high-profile films, including Terry Gilliam's Brazil (1985) and The Brothers Grimm (2005), Dreamchild (1985), Young Sherlock Holmes (1985), Gene Wilder's Haunted Honeymoon (1986), Roman Polanski's Pirates (1986), Peter Greenaway's The Cook, the Thief, His Wife & Her Lover (1989), Mountains of the Moon (1990), Chicago Joe and the Showgirl (1990), Shadowlands (1993), The Portrait of a Lady (1996), The Wind in the Willows (1996), A Knight's Tale (2001), Martin Scorsese's Gangs of New York (2002), Woody Allen's You Will Meet a Tall Dark Stranger (2010), Olivier Dahan's Grace of Monaco (2014), and Mike Leigh's Mr. Turner (2014).

He has also worked extensively in television, including Jack the Ripper, The Odyssey, Merlin, Margaret, The Tudors, Doctor Who, Coronation Street and Father Brown. He portrays Lord Mace Tyrell in Game of Thrones in Season 4, Season 5, and Season 6.

Ashton-Griffiths's debut novel The Case of Cat Adam was published in 2023.

== Personal life ==
Ashton-Griffiths is married to Sharmini Thillaimuthu, a senior studio director at the BBC, with whom he has two children. He lives in Suffolk, and has dual British and Canadian citizenship.

In 2003, Ashton-Griffiths attained an MA in fine art from the University of East London, and in 2016, he attained a PhD in creative writing from the University of East Anglia. In 2010, he was appointed a Fellow of Furness College, Lancaster.

== Filmography ==
=== Film ===
Year	Title	Role	Notes
1984	The Zany Adventures of Robin Hood	1st Coachman	
1985	Brazil	Priest	
1985	Dreamchild	Mr. Duckworth	
1985	Young Sherlock Holmes	Inspector Lestrade	
1985	Pirates	Moonhead	
1985	Plenty	Radio Producer	
1986	Haunted Honeymoon	Francis Jr.	
1987	Empire State	Punter in Cafe	
1989	The Cook, the Thief, His Wife & Her Lover	Turpin	
1989	Seven Minutes	Watchman	
1990	Mountains of the Moon	Lord Cowley	
1990	Chicago Joe and the Showgirl	Inspector Tarr	
1991	King Ralph	Royal Photographer	
1993	Shadowlands	Dr. Monk	
1994	The Madness of King George	MP	
1995	Restoration	Mr. Bung	
1996	The Portrait of a Lady	Bob Bantling	
1996	Jude	Auctioneer	
1996	The Wind in the Willows	The Prosecution Counsel	
1997	Swept from the Sea	Canon Van Stone	
1999	You're Dead	Cliff Sniffton	
2001	A Knight's Tale	Old Bishop	
2001	Deflation	Meditating Man	Short film; also writer and director
2002	Gangs of New York	P. T. Barnum	
2002	Nicholas Nickleby	Doctor	
2003	What a Girl Wants	Lord Orwood	
2004	Devil's Gate	Eagle	
2005	The Brothers Grimm	Mayor	
2006	Irish Jam	Tom Flannery	
2008	Mutant Chronicles	Science Monk	
2009	Bright Star	Shopkeeper	
2009	Samuel Johnson: The Dictionary Man	Samuel Johnson	
2009	Tormented	Mr Humpage	
2009	Hell's Pavement	Daffyd Tudor	
2010	You Will Meet a Tall Dark Stranger	Jonathan Wunch	
2011	A Gun for George	Mr. Maddock	Short film
2013	Summer in February	Jory	
2014	Grace of Monaco	Alfred Hitchcock	
2014	Mr. Turner	Henry William Pickersgill	
2015	The London Firm	The Contractor	
2015	Dragonheart 3: The Sorcerer's Curse	The Potter	
2015	The Lobster	Doctor	
2017	Breathe	Chaplain	
2017	Crooked House	Gaitskill	
2017	The Death of Stalin	Musician #1	
2018	Christopher Robin	Ralph Butterworth	
2020	The Show	First Cabby/Bus Conductor	
2020	My Dad's Christmas Date	Mr Thompson	
2021	The Score	Frank	
2022	The Other Me	Stranger	
2023	My Mother's Wedding	Best Man	
2024	Savage House	Dr Hemmings	

=== Television ===
Year	Title	Role	Notes
1982	The Young Ones	Orgo	Episode: "Boring"
1983	The Nation's Health	Unknown character	Episode: "Acute"
1984	The Secret Servant	Ivan	2 episodes
1986	Prospects	Eddie	2 episodes
1986	C.A.T.S. Eyes	Humbart	Episode: "Freezeheat"
1987	Hardwicke House	P.E. Teacher	Episode: "First Day of Term"
1988	Crossbow	Town Crier	Episode: "The Citadel"
1988	Jack the Ripper	Rodman	2 episodes
1989	Shadow of the Noose	William Thompson	Episode: "Gun in Hand"
1989	The Bill	D.I. Larber	Episode: "Time Out"
1990	Grange Hill	Walt	4 episodes
1991	Lovejoy	Antique Shop Owner	Episode: "Montezuma's Revenge"
1992	The Young Indiana Jones Chronicles	Sinister German	Episode: "Austria, March 1917"
1992	The Life and Times of Henry Pratt	Len Arrowsmith	2 episodes
1993	Heidi	Churchman	Miniseries
1993	The Darling Buds of May	Mr. Ramsbottom	2 episodes
1994	Martin Chuzzlewit	George Chuzzlewit	2 episodes
1994	The Wimbledon Poisoner	Vicar	2 episodes
1995	Go Now	Walsh	Television film
1995	The Plant	Geoff the Producer	Television film
1996	Tales from the Crypt	Valdemar Tymrak	Episode: "Report from the Grave"
1996	The Fortunes and Misfortunes of Moll Flanders	Gent at Mint	
1997	The Odyssey	Polites	2 episodes
1997	Ivanhoe	Prior Aymer	4 episodes
1997	Cadfael	Thomas of Bristol	Episode: "St. Peter's Fair"
1998	Merlin	Sir Boris	Miniseries
1998	The Children of the New Forest	Miller Sprigge	Miniseries
1998	Vanity Fair	King George IV	1 episode
2000	Lady Audley's Secret	Dr. Alwyn Mosgrave	Television film
2001	As If	Shower Man	Episode: "Alex's POV"
2001	The Wonderful World of Disney	Friar Tuck	Episode: "Princess of Thieves"
2001	Micawber	Mr. Peck	Episode: "Micawber Learns the Truth"
2004	Keen Eddie	Glass Eye Gordon	Episode: "Citizen Cecil"
2005	Empire	Panza	4 episodes
2006	Torchwood	Mr Garet	Episode: "Random Shoes"
2007	Roman Mysteries	Tascius Pomponianus	Episode: "The Secrets of Vesuvius"
2007	A Very British Sex Scandal	"Khaki" Roberts	Television film
2007	Heroes and Villains	General Doppet	Episode: "Napoleon"
2008	The Passion	Syrian Prefect	2 episodes
2008	Terry Pratchett's The Colour of Magic	Lumuel Panter	
2009	Margaret	John Sergeant	Television film
2009	Henry VIII: The Mind of a Tyrant	Cardinal Wolsey	3 episodes
2009	The Tudors	Sir John Hutton	2 episodes
2010	Accidental Farmer	Bill	Television film
2011	Little Crackers	First Magistrate	Episode: "Alan Davies' Little Cracker: The Curious Incident Of The Dog In The Daytime"
2013	NTSF:SD:SUV::	Robinson	Episode: "U-KO'ed"
2014	The Musketeers	Elderly Priest	Episode: "Friends and Enemies"
2014	This is Jinsy	Head of Decency	Episode: "Penny's Pendant"
2014	Doctor Who	Quayle	Episode: "Robot of Sherwood"
2014–15	Coronation Street	Neurosurgeon	7 episodes
2014–16	Game of Thrones	Mace Tyrell	13 episodes
2015	Doctors	Dr. Philip Plumridge	Episode: "Are You Kidding Me?"
2016	Father Brown	Cardinal Bonipogio	Episode: "The Daughter of Autolycus"
2016	Marley's Ghosts	Mr. Busby	Episode: "Carly"
2017	Taboo	Abraham Appleby	Episode: "Episode 1"
2017	Quacks	Bishop of Lambeth	2 episodes
2018	Stan Lee's Lucky Man	Arthur McCarthy	1 episode
