= Keira Knightley =

British actress (born 1985)

Keira Knightley OBE
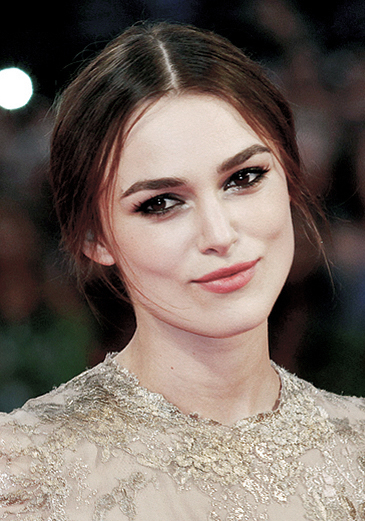
- Knightley in 2011
- Born: Keira Christina Knightley; 26 March 1985 (age 41); London, England
- Occupation: Actress
- Years active: 1991–present
- Works: Full list
- Spouse: James Righton (m. 2013)
- Children: 2
- Parents: Will Knightley (father); Sharman Macdonald (mother)
- Awards: Full list

Keira Christina Knightley (/ˈkɪərə ˈnaɪtli/ KEER-ə NYTE-lee; born 26 March 1985) is a British actress. Known for her work in independent films and blockbusters, particularly period dramas, she has received numerous accolades, including nominations for two Academy Awards, two British Academy Film Awards, four Golden Globes, and a Laurence Olivier Award. In 2018, she was appointed an OBE for services to drama and charity.

Born in London to English actor Will Knightley and Scottish playwright Sharman Macdonald, Knightley obtained an agent at age six and initially worked in commercials and television films. Following a minor role as Sabé in Star Wars: Episode I – The Phantom Menace (1999), her breakthrough came when she played a tomboy footballer in Bend It Like Beckham (2002) and co-starred in Love Actually (2003). She achieved global recognition for playing Elizabeth Swann in the Pirates of the Caribbean film series (2003–2007, 2017).

For her portrayal of Elizabeth Bennet in Pride & Prejudice (2005), Knightley was nominated for the Academy Award for Best Actress. She starred in several more period films over the next few years, including Atonement (2007), The Duchess (2008), A Dangerous Method (2011), and Anna Karenina (2012). She took on contemporary-set parts in Begin Again (2013) and Jack Ryan: Shadow Recruit (2014), and returned to historical films playing Joan Clarke in The Imitation Game (2014), earning a nomination for the Academy Award for Best Supporting Actress. She has since starred as the title character in Colette (2018), journalist Loretta McLaughlin in Boston Strangler (2023), and a spy in the thriller series Black Doves (2024–present). On stage, Knightley has appeared in two West End productions: The Misanthrope in 2009, which earned her an Olivier Award nomination, and The Children's Hour in 2011. She also starred as the titular heroine in the 2015 Broadway production of Thérèse Raquin.

Knightley is known for her outspoken stance on social issues and has worked extensively with Amnesty International, Oxfam, and Comic Relief. She is married to musician James Righton, with whom she has two daughters.

== Early life and education ==
Keira Christina Knightley was born on 26 March 1985, in the southwestern London suburb of Teddington, to stage actor Will Knightley and playwright Sharman Macdonald. Her father is English and her mother is of Scottish and Welsh descent. Knightley has an older brother, Caleb. Macdonald worked as a playwright after her acting career came to an end. Knightley's parents encountered substantial financial difficulties following the birth of her brother; her father, a "middling" actor, agreed to a second child only if her mother sold a script first. However, her parents' varying degrees of success did not deter Knightley's curiosity about the profession. Macdonald introduced her children to theatre and ballet very early, inspiring Knightley's interest in acting.

Knightley attended Teddington School. She was diagnosed with dyslexia at six, but by the time she was eleven, with her parents' support, she says, "they deemed me to have got over it sufficiently". She is still a slow reader and cannot read out loud. Due to her hard time reading, the school classified her as having "special educational needs", which made her feel discouraged. Her parents used the promise of acting to encourage her to work harder. She was meant to be named "Kiera", the anglicised form of "Kira", after the Soviet figure skater Kira Ivanova, whom her father admired; however, Macdonald, who is dyslexic, misspelt the name when she registered her daughter's birth certificate, writing the e before the i.

Knightley has said she was "single-minded about acting". At age three, she requested to obtain an agent like her parents and secured one at six. This led to her taking a number of small parts in television dramas. She acted in a number of local amateur productions, which included After Juliet, written by her mother, and United States, written by her drama teacher. Knightley began studying her A-Levels at Esher College in Surrey but left after a year to pursue an acting career. Her mother's friends encouraged her to go to drama school, which she declined for financial and professional reasons.

== Career ==
=== 1993–2002: Career beginnings and breakthrough ===
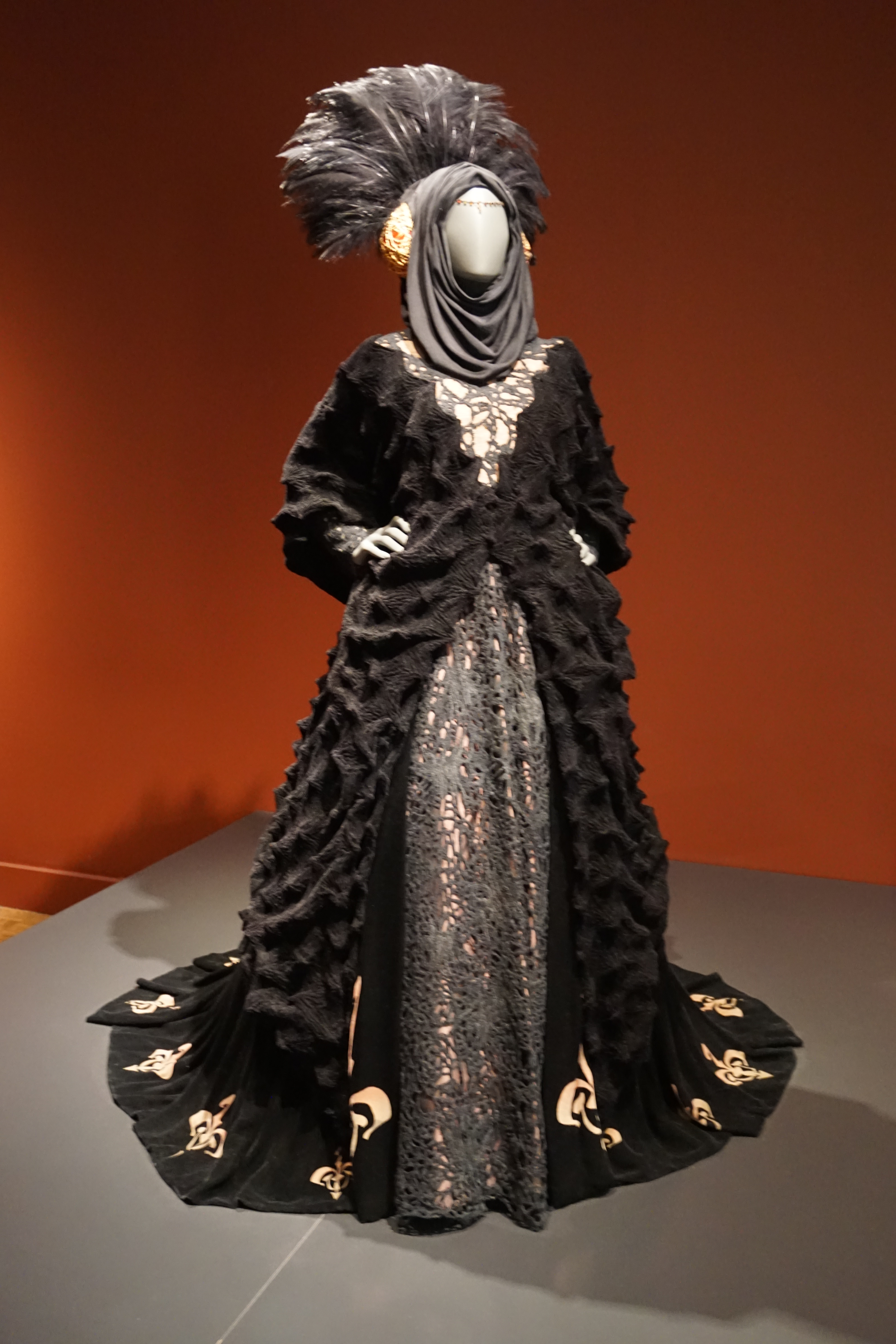
Knightley's costume from Star Wars: Episode I – The Phantom Menace (1999) on display at the Detroit Institute of Arts

After obtaining an agent at age six, Knightley began working in commercials and small television roles. Her first onscreen appearance was in the 1993 Screen One television episode titled "Royal Celebration". She then played Natasha Jordan, a young girl whose mother is involved in an extramarital affair, in the romantic drama A Village Affair (1995). After appearing in a spate of television films through the mid-to-late 1990s, including Innocent Lies (1995), The Treasure Seekers (1996), Coming Home (1998), and Oliver Twist (1999), Knightley landed the role of Sabé, Padmé Amidala's handmaiden and decoy, in the 1999 science fiction blockbuster Star Wars: Episode I – The Phantom Menace. Her dialogue was dubbed over by Natalie Portman, who played Padmé. Knightley was cast in the role because of her close resemblance to Portman; even the two actresses' mothers had difficulty telling their daughters apart when they were in full make-up.

In her first major role, the 2001 Walt Disney Productions television film Princess of Thieves, Knightley played the daughter of Robin Hood. In preparation for the part, she trained for several weeks in archery, fencing, and riding. Concurrently, she appeared in The Hole, a thriller that received a direct-to-video release in the US. The film's director Nick Hamm described her as "a young version of Julie Christie". Knightley also took on the role of Lara Antipova in the 2002 miniseries adaptation of Doctor Zhivago, to positive reviews and high ratings. In the same year, Knightley starred as a pregnant drug addict in Gillies MacKinnon's drama film Pure. Co-starring Molly Parker and Harry Eden, the film had its world premiere at the 2002 Toronto International Film Festival. In a retrospect review for AboutFilm.com, Carlo Cavagna noted Knightley's screen presence and wrote that "[although Knightley] doesn't have half of Parker's ability [...] she has spunk and grit [and] shines brightly in Pure".

Knightley landed a breakthrough role when she starred in Gurinder Chadha's sports comedy film Bend It Like Beckham, which was a box office hit in the U.K and U.S. Knightley portrayed Jules, a tomboy football player struggling against social norms who convinces her friend to pursue the sport. The film surprised critics who were laudatory of its "charming" and "inspiring" nature, social context and the cast's performances. Knightley and her co-star Parminder Nagra attracted international attention for their performances; critic James Berardinelli, who was largely laudatory of the film and the "energetic and likable" cast, noted that Knightley and Nagra brought "a lot of spirit to their instantly likable characters". To prepare for their roles, they underwent three months of extensive football training under the English football coach Simon Clifford. Knightley was initially sceptical of the project: in an interview with Tracy Smith she said, "I remember telling friends I was doing this girls' soccer movie [...] And nobody thought that it was gonna be any good."

=== 2003–2007: Pirates of the Caribbean and worldwide recognition ===
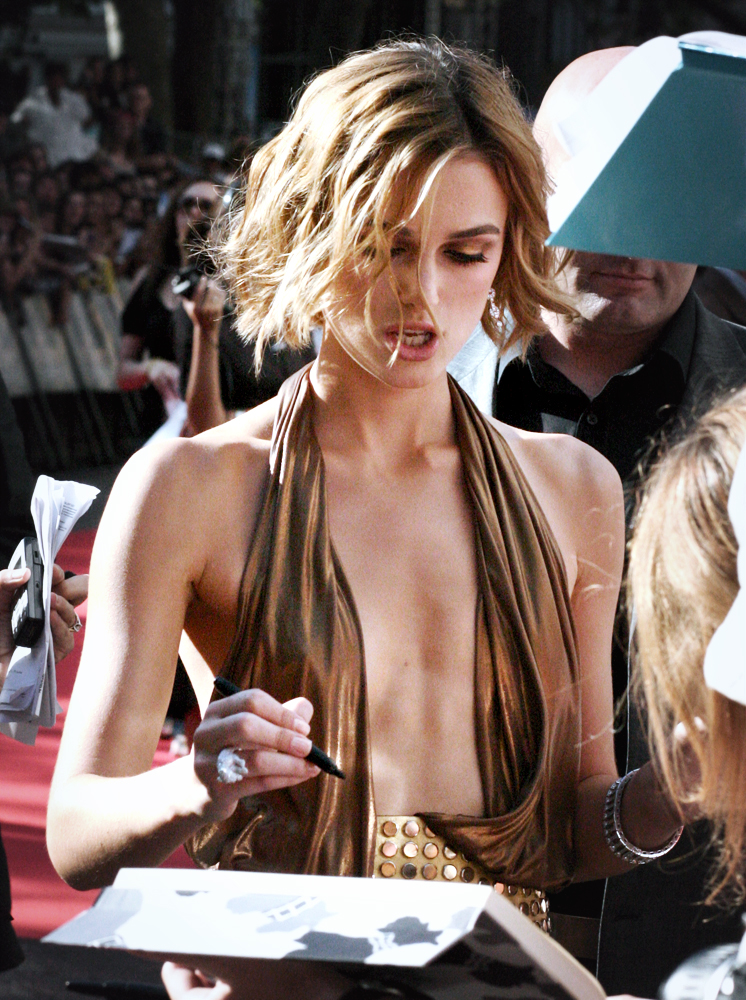
Knightley at the premiere of Pirates of the Caribbean: Dead Man's Chest (2006)

Knightley was cast as Elizabeth Swann in the 2003 American fantasy swashbuckler film Pirates of the Caribbean: The Curse of the Black Pearl. The film, based on the Disney theme park attraction, revolves around infamous buccaneer Jack Sparrow and blacksmith Will Turner rescuing Swann, in possession of a cursed golden medallion, from 18th-century pirates. The producers Jerry Bruckheimer and Gore Verbinski cast Knightley for her "indescribable quality [...] reminiscent of motion picture stars from Hollywood's heyday." Knightley underestimated the stunt work required and believed she would primarily be sitting in carriages; at one point during filming, she stood for two days on a plank and rejected a stunt double's offer to jump off the platform for the scene. Despite boasting the names of stars like Johnny Depp and Orlando Bloom and a $135 million budget, Pirates was expected to fail at the box office. Knightley herself was not optimistic about its prospects. The film opened at number one on the box office, and became one of the highest-grossing releases of the year, with worldwide revenues of $654 million. Elvis Mitchell of The New York Times likened Knightley's "strident and confident" physical assurance to that of Nicole Kidman, while Keith Phipps of The A.V. Club described her and Bloom as appealing leads.

Also in 2003, Knightley appeared in Richard Curtis's Christmas-themed romantic comedy Love Actually, featuring an ensemble cast, which included her childhood idol Emma Thompson. Knightley played Juliet, a woman whose fiancé's best man is secretly in love with her. Peter Travers of Rolling Stone criticised the waste of Knightley's talent in a "nothing" role, while Megan Conner of The Guardian remarked that the film turned Knightley into a household name. Love Actually has been referred to as a modern-day Christmas classic. Knightley believes the film's trajectory to be "extraordinary", given that its popularity resurfaced a few years after the film's release. Knightley's only release of 2004 was the historical film King Arthur, where she played Guinevere, a warrior queen and the wife of the titular character. The part required her to learn boxing, archery, and riding. The critic A. O. Scott praised Knightley for "throw[ing] herself bodily into every scene". Although the film received unfavourable reviews, Knightley's stature as a performer grew; she was voted by the readers of Hello magazine as the industry's most promising teen star, and featured in Time magazine's article, which stated that she seemed dedicated to develop herself as a serious actor rather than a film star.

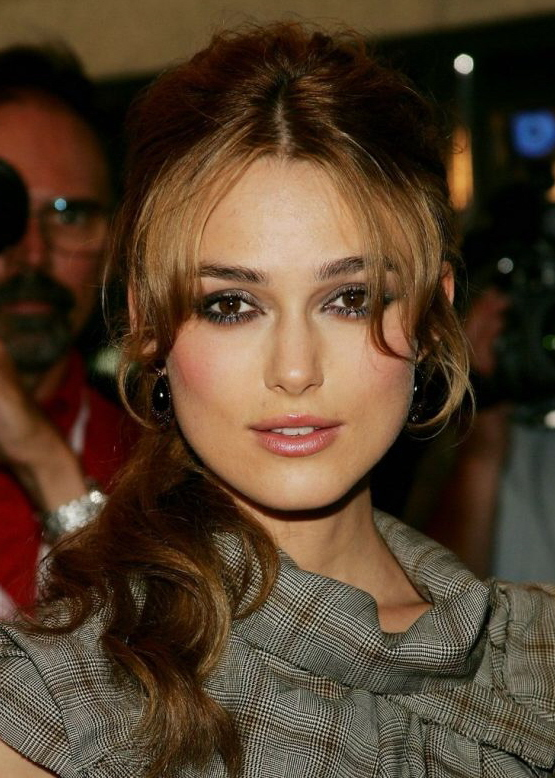
Knightley attending the premiere of Pride & Prejudice at the 2005 Toronto International Film Festival; the role earned Knightley her first Academy Award nomination

Knightley appeared in three films in 2005, the first of which was the psychological thriller The Jacket, co-starring Adrien Brody. In a mixed review for Empire, Kim Newman wrote that the role was unlike the ones she had previously taken up : "getting out of period gear and talking American, tries to broaden her range and is arguably well-cast". Knightley next played the titular character in Tony Scott's French-American action film Domino, based on the life of Domino Harvey. The film's release was delayed on several occasions and, on its eventual release in November, it received negative reviews and performed poorly at the box office.

Knightley's most successful release of the year was Pride & Prejudice, a period drama based on Jane Austen's novel Pride and Prejudice. The director Joe Wright cast Knightley for her tomboyish nature combined with a "lively mind" and sense of humour. Knightley, who had admired the book from a young age, said of her character, "The beauty of Elizabeth is that every woman who ever reads the book seems to recognise herself, with all her faults and imperfections." On release, the film became a huge commercial success, with total collections of around US$120 million worldwide, and received positive reviews from critics. Writing for The Guardian, Peter Bradshaw labelled her performance of "beauty, delicacy, spirit and wit; in her growing lustre and confidence" and Derek Elley of Variety found her "luminous strength" to be reminiscent of a young Audrey Hepburn. Knightley earned "Best Actress in a Leading Role" nominations at the Golden Globes and the Academy Awards for her performance at age 20, becoming the third-youngest nominee for the latter. Knightley's consecutive successes came with increased media scrutiny, and she later admitted to experiencing struggles with her mental health during this period.

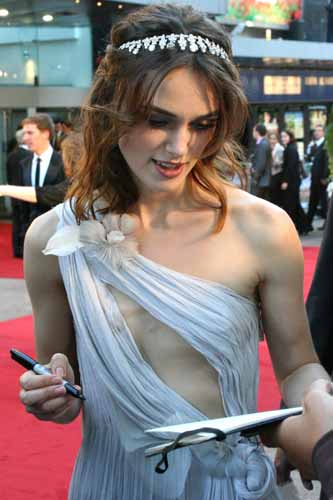
Knightley at the premiere of Atonement held at the Odeon Leicester Square in London on 4 September 2007

Knightley was invited to join the Academy of Motion Picture Arts and Sciences, among other artists in 2006. In 2004, the second and third films of the Pirates of the Caribbean series were conceived, with screenwriters Ted Elliott and Terry Rossio developing a story arc that would span both sequels, in which Knightley reprised her role as Elizabeth Swann. The plot of the films see Swann buck convention to seek adventure and become fierce pirate and fighter to match the skills of Sparrow and her love interest, Turner. The sequel installments allowed Knightley to study sword-fighting, which she had sought to do since the first film. Filming for the projects took place in 2005; Pirates of the Caribbean: Dead Man's Chest released in July 2006, with the worldwide collections of $1.066 billion, becoming the biggest financial hit of Knightley's career. The third installment in the series, Pirates of the Caribbean: At World's End, was released in May, the following year. A. O Scott termed her performance "a vision of imperial British pluckiness, with an intriguing dash of romantic recklessness that surfaces toward the end". In November 2006, it was reported that Knightley didn't want to participate in any further sequels. By 2010, both Knightley and Orlando Bloom had repeatedly been quoted in saying they wanted to move on.

Knightley's continued association with period dramas yielded varying results, as seen with two of her 2007 releases, François Girard's Silk, and Joe Wright's Atonement, the feature film adaptations of the novels by Alessandro Baricco and Ian McEwan respectively. The former project failed at the box office, while the latter became a critical and commercial success. Knightley played Cecilia Tallis, the elder of the two Tallis sisters, who struggles with a wartime romance with her love interest, played by James McAvoy. She admitted that the pacing on the smaller, more intimate film was an adjustment compared to the Pirates franchise. In preparing for the film, Knightley studied the novel as well as the "naturalism" of the performance as seen in films from the 1930s and 1940s, such as In Which We Serve (1942) and Brief Encounter (1945). She admired the multi-layered and "fascinating" nature of her character's behaviour. Knightley's performance won the Empire Award for Best Actress, and earned her nominations for the BAFTA and the Golden Globes awards, also in the leading actress categories. The critic Richard Roeper, who thought the lead duo were "superb" in their respective roles, was puzzled by their failure to receive Academy Award nominations. The green dress worn by Knightley during the film's climactic scene garnered substantive press attention, and was subsequently regarded as one of the greatest costumes in film history.

=== 2008–2013: Independent films and stage work ===
Knightley appeared alongside Sienna Miller, Cillian Murphy, and Matthew Rhys in John Maybury's 2008 wartime drama The Edge of Love. The film had her play the role of Vera Phillips, a childhood friend of Welsh poet Dylan Thomas and his wife Caitlin Macnamara. Knightley wrote the script with her mother, Sharman Macdonald, with Macnamara in mind. After Knightley signed on, her character's role was increased with the film focusing on her romance with a British soldier. Knightley connected to Vera's quietness, and described her as "tragic and beautiful". She based her performance on Marlene Dietrich, and was to mime to her prerecorded voice, before being told by Maybury to sing live. Knightley initially felt embarrassed to do so, saying she "[shook] like a leaf" but eventually went through with the plan. The film became a moderate critical and commercial success. Knightley's performance and singing abilities were praised;The Independent noted that Knightley "gives Vera an independence and complexity that's aeons ahead", while the Los Angeles Times wrote "the film belongs to the women, with Knightley going from strength to strength (and showing she can sing!)".

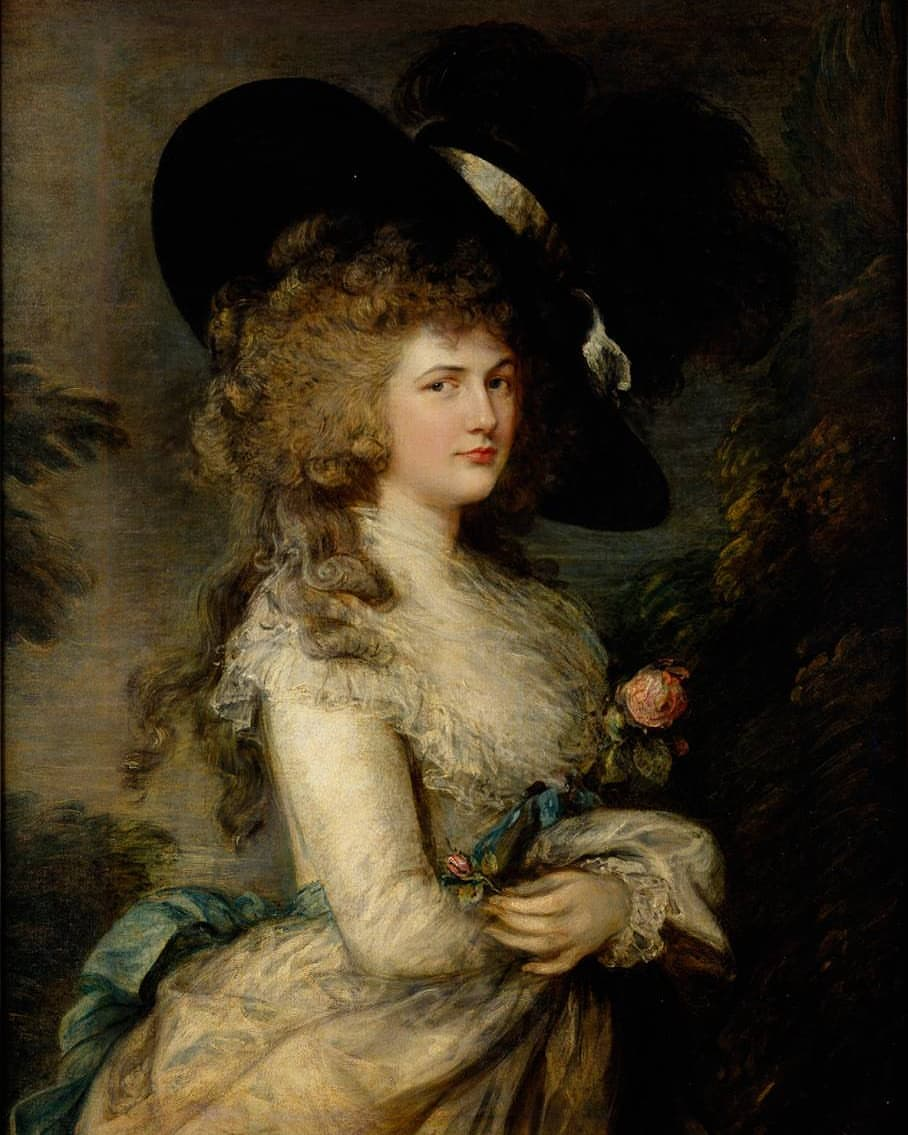
Knightley received critical acclaim for her portrayal of 18th-century aristocrat Georgiana Cavendish in The Duchess (2008)

Knightley then starred as the 18th-century English aristocrat Georgiana Cavendish, Duchess of Devonshire in Saul Dibb's period drama The Duchess (2008), based on the best-selling biographical novel, Georgiana, Duchess of Devonshire by Amanda Foreman. The film tells the story of Georgiana's rise in society as a sociopolitical tastemaker after her marriage disintegrates. The script Knightley was sent was covered in "huge white ostrich feathers" and a gold ribbon. Gabrielle Tana, the film's producer, stated Knightley "brought an instinctive understanding" of such aspects of Georgiana's life as a celebrity from her own experiences. Knightley was attracted to her character's strength and status as a political influence and fashion prowess, while being inwardly vulnerable and isolated. Simon Crooke of Empire described her performance as "an enigmatic, free-spirited turn and a role she'll be remembered for, probably her best role to date in a film not directed by Joe Wright." The following year, she was nominated for a British Independent Film Award for Best Actress. A film adaptation of William Shakespeare's tragedy King Lear set to star Knightley and Anthony Hopkins was cancelled due to recession.

Knightley made her West End debut with Martin Crimp's version of Molière's comedy The Misanthrope. Starring Knightley, Damian Lewis, Tara Fitzgerald, and Dominic Rowan, the play was staged at the Comedy Theatre in December 2009. She portrayed Jennifer, a shallow, amorous, and vulnerable American film star who is courted by an analytical and veracious playwright. Knightley chose the role as she felt that "if I don't do theatre right now, I think I'm going to start being too terrified to do it" and described the production as an "extraordinary and incredibly fulfilling" experience, she was sceptical of her performance. Paul Taylor of The Independent remarked that Knightley was "not only strikingly convincing, but, at times, rather thrilling in its satiric aplomb". However, The Guardian's Michael Billington noted that due to the nature of the role, "one could say that she is not unduly stretched". In recognition of her theatre debut, Knightley was nominated for the Laurence Olivier Award for Best Actress in a Supporting Role and an Evening Standard Award.

Knightley began the new decade with three films; she remarked that her work during this period helped her "empathise with people or with situations that I don't necessarily find it easy to empathise with". Two of the productions, Massy Tadjedin's romantic drama Last Night and William Monahan's crime noir film London Boulevard opened to mixed responses from critics and rank among the lowest-grossing films in Knightley's career. Knightley's other release, Never Let Me Go, an adaptation of Kazuo Ishiguro's novel of the same name fared better at the box office and received positive reviews. Knightley described the script as unique, one that made the reader think. Co-starring Andrew Garfield and Carey Mulligan, Knightley played Ruth, one of three graduates of an autocratic boarding school that discovers their fates in a dystopia. She appeared in a video installation by artist Stuart Pearson Wright titled Maze.

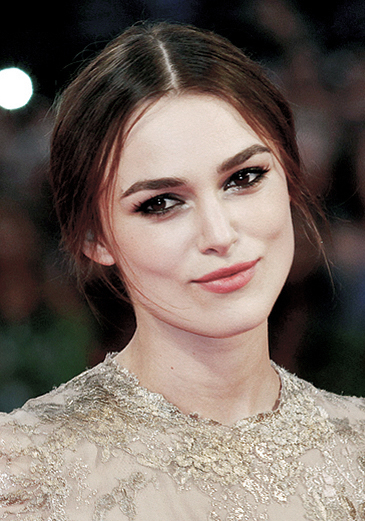
Knightley at the 2011 Venice Film Festival

Knightley starred in a 2011 revival of The Children's Hour by Lillian Hellman at the Comedy Theatre in London. She portrayed Karen Wright, an engaged schoolteacher accused of lesbianism in 1934. Ben Brantley of The New York Times commented that her performance showed an "intensity" and "credible fierceness" within the outdated material. Knightley's sole film release of 2011 was David Cronenberg's historical drama A Dangerous Method, co-starring Viggo Mortensen, Michael Fassbender, and Vincent Cassel. Based on writer Christopher Hampton's 2002 stage play The Talking Cure and set on the eve of World War I, the film depicts the turbulent relationships between fledgling psychiatrist Carl Jung, his mentor Sigmund Freud and Sabina Spielrein. Knightley portrayed Spielrein, the troubled but beautiful young psychoanalyst who comes between Jung and Freud. Knightley spent four months reading and discussing her character's behaviour with psychologists to prepare for the role. She appreciated the depth and variety of her character arc, which she viewed as rare for female roles. The film premiered at the 68th Venice International Film Festival to a positive reception, while Knightley earned generally favourable reviews by critics, with Andrew O'Hehir of Salon hailing her as "the real star of this film".

Knightley co-starred with Steve Carell in the 2012 comedy-drama Seeking a Friend for the End of the World, which was critically panned. Later that year, she reunited with director Joe Wright to film their third production, Anna Karenina, in which she starred as the title character. She deemed this collaboration the most important of her career. Knightley viewed that her character's complex "moral culpability" was in question, but attracted compassion. Knightley received positive reviews for her performance, prompting early Oscar buzz. Batsy Sharky of the Los Angeles Times wrote that Knightley "puts hearts and anguish on the line in trying to bring an emotional reality". The 2013 Toronto International Film Festival saw the premiere of Knightley's first musical film Begin Again with Mark Ruffalo. Directed by John Carney, the film had its theatrical release in 2014. The Guardian found Knightley and Ruffalo to be "nicely natural as the increasingly idealistic musos". Carney later repeatedly criticised Knightley's performance in the film, saying she was not convincing enough in portraying a singer-songwriter and derogatorily referred to her as a "model". He later apologised to her via Twitter for his comments. Knightley later remarked that music "never sinks in" for her, and she is more interested in books and drama. Later that year, she appeared in Karl Lagerfeld's short period film Once Upon a Time ...

=== 2014–present: Biographical and political roles ===
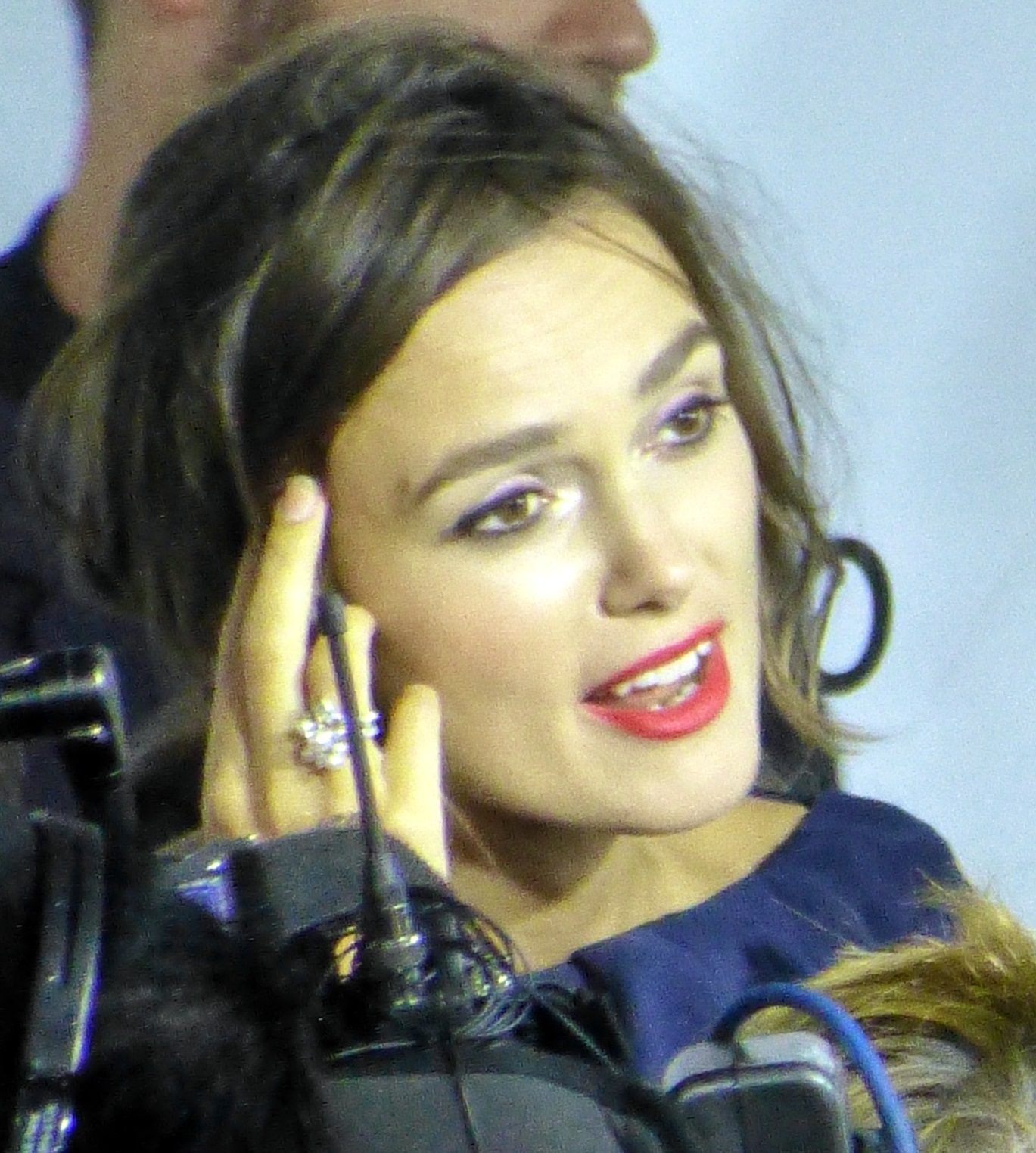
Knightley at the premiere of Laggies (2014)

In July 2014, Knightley stated that she had reached the end of the first stage of her career, and wished to depart from "neurotic" roles. 2014 began for Knightley with the spy thriller Jack Ryan: Shadow Recruit, the fifth instalment in the film series, alongside Chris Pine. She portrayed Dr. Cathy Muller, Ryan's eventual wife. Knightley sought to do a lighter film than her previous work, looked forward to working with director Kenneth Branagh. The film received mixed critical reviews nonetheless strong box-office response. Knightley's next film Laggies, premiered at the 2014 Sundance Film Festival. A romantic comedy also starring Chloë Grace Moretz and Sam Rockwell, the film follows the life of Megan, played by Knightley, a 28-year-old overeducated underachiever going through a quarter-life crisis. Knightley empathised with her character's delayed maturity and appreciated the film's telling from a female perspective. Laggies opened to mostly positive reviews from critics, with Knightley's performance praised by critics. Inkoo Kaang of TheWrap referred to her as a "loose-limbed revelation" and lauded her "delightfully uncouth" performance.

The film was followed by her appearance in Morten Tyldum's historical drama The Imitation Game, a film based on the life of British mathematician Alan Turing, played by Benedict Cumberbatch. Knightley portrayed cryptanalyst and numismatist Joan Clarke, who decrypted German intelligence codes for the British government during World War II with Turing. Knightley researched interviews with Clarke, and sought to keep her "upper-class quality", drawing on the depth of her emotions and protectiveness of Turing from the script. The Imitation Game became a critical and commercial success grossing over $233.6 million. For her performance, Knightley received her second Academy Award and BAFTA Award nominations, and third Golden Globe Award nomination, all for Best Actress in a Supporting Role. Conversely, Lady Jean Forde, who worked with Clarke and Turing, felt Knightley was "nothing like" Clarke and was "too beautiful" to play her.

Knightley's sole release in 2015 was as part of the ensemble cast in the biographical disaster film Everest. The film was based on the 1996 Mount Everest disaster with Knightley portraying mountaineer Rob Hall's wife. Everest opened to generally positive reviews from critics. Variety wrote that Knightley gave a "deeply felt performance" as a woman "haunted by the possibility" of losing her spouse. In October 2015, Knightley made her Broadway debut playing the title role in Helen Edmundson's adaptation of Émile Zola's Thérèse Raquin at Studio 54. Knightley took the role after turning down the project twice, as she thought herself incapable of playing the part. She found interest in her character's "caged" circumstance, as well as her dark, active role in the play, as she sought to depart from passive supporting roles. Of her performance, Alexandra Villarreal of The Huffington Post wrote: "She fumes, and rages, and withdraws, and you can watch her psychological evolution from stifled wife to impassioned mistress to haunted murderer".

In 2016, it emerged that Knightley was set to star in a feature biopic about 18th-century Russian empress Catherine the Great, directed by Barbra Streisand, which has not come to fruition. Knightley appeared in the ensemble drama Collateral Beauty (2016), alongside Will Smith, Edward Norton, Kate Winslet, and Helen Mirren. The film was critically panned, and earned the cast a Razzie nomination. Despite previously stating on a number of occasions that she would never return to the Pirates of the Caribbean series since 2006, Knightley reprised the role of Elizabeth Swann with a cameo appearance in 2017's Pirates of the Caribbean: Dead Men Tell No Tales, after test audiences repeatedly inquired about her character.

Knightley starred in the biographical drama Colette as the titular French author. The film, released in 2018, sees Colette's social ascent in Belle Époque society through her provocative novels, but she is exploited by her husband, who plagiarises her work. Knightley believed the film connected strongly to modern-day feminism, and depicted cultural change in gender politics. To prepare for the part, Knightley read Colette's novels, among them The Vagabond and Chéri, and initially planned to visit her birthplace of Burgundy, France. She found the author "inspiring", and admired her imperfections as well as her courage. The film, released at the Sundance Film Festival, was critically successful, with Knightley's performance receiving acclaim. Manohla Dargis of The New York Times praised her vibrance and "expressive physicality", and Jordan Hoffman of The Guardian wrote that the film saw Knightley in "top form: luminous, clever, sexy and sympathetic."

Also in 2018, she played the Sugar Plum Fairy in Disney's adaptation of The Nutcracker, titled The Nutcracker and the Four Realms, which was critically panned. In 2019, Knightley co-starred in The Aftermath, a film adaptation of the novel by Rhidian Brook, alongside Alexander Skarsgård. Knightley played Rachel, a "cold and complex" British army wife traumatised by her son's death by a German bomb. The film sees her and her husband move to Germany while dealing with grief. The film received mixed reviews. The Boston Globe's Ty Burr credited Knightley for adding "conviction, grace, heart, and nerve" to the film, while Katie Walsh of the Los Angeles Times felt Knightley and Skarsgård were too reserved. Knightley portrayed whistleblower Katharine Gun in Official Secrets (2019), which was premiered at the Sundance Film Festival on 28 January 2019 to positive reviews. Knightley believed the film's depiction of Iraq War and government accountability connected with modern politics. Writing for The Guardian, Peter Bradshaw praised Knightley's "focused, plausible and sympathetic performance". Gun also expressed her contentment with the film.

Knightley's first role of the decade was feminist activist Sally Alexander in Misbehaviour (2020), a film about the crowning of the first black contestant at the 1970 Miss World competition. The film discusses the nuances of intersectionality in second wave feminism; Knightley was drawn to the political aspects of the project. Misbehaviour was received positively, with Variety's Guy Lodge dubbing Knightley "likable as ever" but admitted she portrays "the least intriguing figure". Knightley was due to produce and star in The Essex Serpent, an Apple TV+ adaptation of Sarah Perry's novel, but dropped out over concerns about access to childcare during the lockdown period of the COVID-19 pandemic. She starred in the 2021 holiday comedy Silent Night. Knightley voiced the lead role in the dramatic animated film Charlotte, a true story about a young artist during the Holocaust.

Knightley took a year off work to spend time with family. In 2023, she portrayed reporter Loretta McLaughlin in the crime drama film Boston Strangler based on the infamous true story of Boston Strangler murders. In the following year, she starred as a spy in the Netflix thriller series Black Doves. For her performance, she was nominated for the Critics' Choice Television Award and the Golden Globe Award for Best Actress – Television Series Drama. Knightley stars in the mystery thriller The Woman in Cabin 10 as a journalist.

In 2025, she performed the role of Dolores Umbridge in the Audible Harry Potter audiobook. This was met with controversy due to an ongoing boycott of Harry Potter over the author's views on transgender people, to which Knightley laughed and claimed she was not aware, before saying that "We're all going to have to figure out how to live together, aren't we? And we've all got very different opinions. I hope that we can all find respect."

Knightley starred opposite comedian Joe Wilkinson in the Waitrose Christmas adverts for Christmas 2025 and Christmas 2026.

In 2026, Knightley is set to play the role of Christa-Maria Sieland in a stage adaptation of the film The Lives of Others at the Adelphi Theatre in London.

== Public image ==
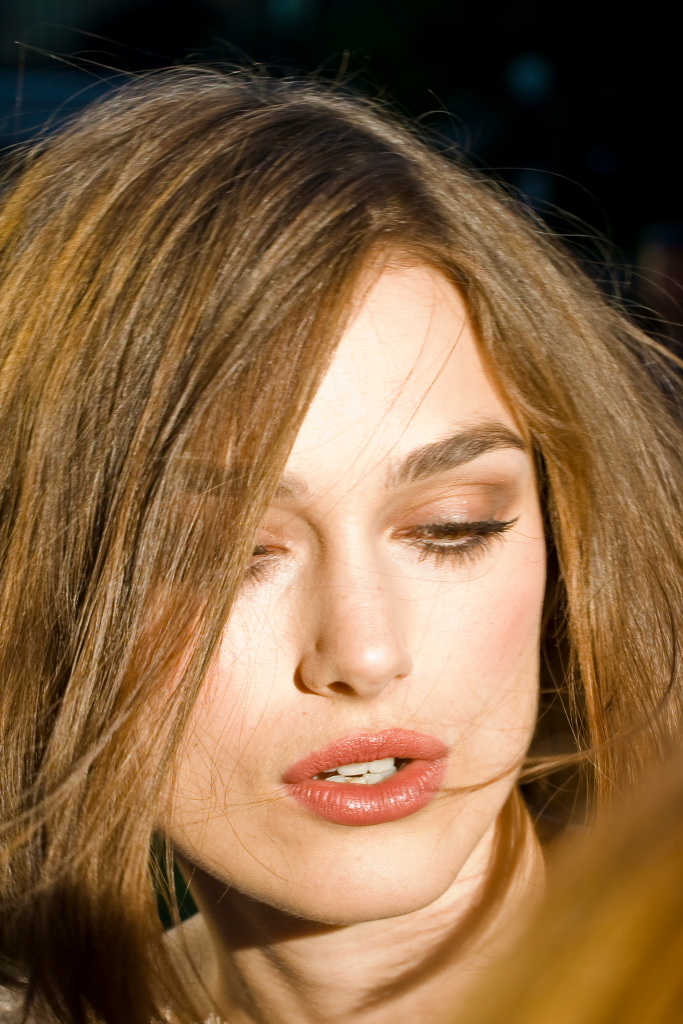
Knightley at the 2011 Toronto International Film Festival

Off-screen, Geoffrey Macnab of The Independent describes Knightley as "sensible and self-deprecating" and Elizabeth Day of Harper's Bazaar says of Knightley's persona: "She is extremely nice, swears more than you might think and – yes – ... effortlessly beautiful." Writing for The New York Times, Jesse McKinley stated that Knightley is "known for her ability to sparkle and charm in several accents," while her Thérèse Raquin co-star, Judith Light, praised her "down-to-earth demeanor, intelligence and sense of humor."

Knightley has been described as "famously open with media," though she has asserted the contrary. During the 2000s, Knightley faced an "extraordinary amount of vitriol" from the press. The Guardian wrote that "if she is not too pretty to be worthy of her success, she is too posh, too thin. If there is a more valid reason why [...] they often struggle to articulate it." Despite multiple successful films and award nominations, the criticism affected her, and Knightley felt that she "didn't know [her] trade." Media scrutiny decreased as her career progressed, and she spaces out her public appearances to maintain attention on her films. Beginning in the 2010s, Knightley regained confidence in her abilities, and by the release of Colette (2018), she felt she had learned her craft and mentally occupied a "good place where I feel pretty confident about what I can do."

Several publications have described Knightley as one of the finest actresses of her generation. Knightley has been widely recognised for her extensive repertoire of period dramas throughout her career. She identifies with "break[ing] out of that image of femininity" and appreciates period films' "overt cage" to be broken out of. Writer Anne Helen Petersen states that the varying personalities of her historical roles are united in the "larger idea" Knightley represents: "that of women ostensibly performing a version of proper womanhood — all while quietly negotiating, or cracking under, the weight of doing so." She has criticised contemporary-set films, finding their depiction of sexual violence against women excessive. Knightley is reputed for her signature "strong female lead" roles, and she has been compared to actresses Katharine Hepburn, Greta Garbo, Audrey Hepburn, and Nicole Kidman.

In a 2004 BBC poll, she was named among the most influential people in British culture. Knightley has often been ascribed to the "English rose" archetype. Knightley has been included several times on FHM's "100 Sexiest Women in the World" list, making her first appearance in 2004 and topping the list in 2006; she was included in every subsequent issue until 2009. She was part of the American editions of the list from 2004 to 2006, and was also placed ninth on the Maxim Hot 100 list in 2006.

== Other ventures ==
=== Advocacy and philanthropy ===
Knightley received media attention for her perspectives on feminism, voiced in an interview with Harper's Bazaar UK published in the February 2014 edition. She explained that women face greater hurdles in the film industry compared to their male counterparts, and also revealed that she was perplexed by the use of "feminist" in a derogatory sense. Knightley posed topless for the September 2014 cover of Interview magazine, on condition that the image not be digitally altered, to draw attention to how "women's bodies are a battleground and photography is partly to blame." For International Women's Day 2014, Knightley was one of the artist signatories of Amnesty International's letter to British Prime Minister David Cameron, in which the organisation campaigned for women's rights in Afghanistan. After the birth of her first daughter, she penned an essay about childbirth, entitled "The Weaker Sex", featured in the collection Feminists Don't Wear Pink and Other Lies. Knightley does not shoot nude scenes for her films, unless directed by a female filmmaker.

Knightley is the face of an Amnesty International campaign to support human rights, marking the sixtieth anniversary of the United Nations Universal Declaration of Human Rights. In 2004, she travelled to Ethiopia alongside Richard Curtis, Sanjeev Bhaskar and Julian Metcalfe on behalf of the Comic Relief charity. She posed for photos for WaterAid in 2005 and also for the American Library Association's "Read" campaign (a promotional poster of Pride & Prejudice). The dress she wore to the 2006 Academy Awards was donated to the charity Oxfam, where it raised £4,300. In April 2009, Knightley appeared in a video to raise awareness of domestic abuse entitled Cut shot for Women's Aid. The video created controversy, with some sources calling it too graphic, while other groups support the video for showing a realistic depiction of domestic violence. In November 2010, Knightley became patron of the SMA Trust, a British charity that funds medical research into the disease spinal muscular atrophy. In July 2014 Knightley travelled to South Sudan on behalf of Oxfam to meet refugees of the South Sudanese Civil War and raise awareness of the conflict.

In May 2016, among other British actors, Knightley signed a letter imploring Britain to vote "remain" in the UK EU referendum. Later, she appeared in a video aimed at encouraging younger people to vote in the referendum. On 12 September 2016, Knightley, along with Cate Blanchett, Chiwetel Ejiofor, Peter Capaldi, Douglas Booth, Neil Gaiman, Jesse Eisenberg, Juliet Stevenson, Kit Harington and Stanley Tucci, appeared in a video from the United Nations' refugee agency UNHCR to help raise awareness of the global refugee crisis. The video, titled "What They Took With Them", has the actors reading a poem, written by Jenifer Toksvig and inspired by primary accounts of refugees, and is part of UNHCR's #WithRefugees campaign, of which also includes a petition to governments to expand asylum to provide further shelter, integrating job opportunities, and education. In September 2016, Knightley co-hosted A Night to Remember, part of the Green Carpet Challenge, a charity event highlighting sustainability within the fashion industry.

In September 2017, Knightley traded stocks on behalf of the spinal muscular atrophy charity SMA Trust as part of the BGC Charity Day, which was set up to commemorate the stockbrokers who were killed during the September 11 attacks. In April 2020, Knightley participated in a World Health Day livestream to raise money for charity during the COVID-19 pandemic. In June 2020, she and other celebrities designed a range of pin badges for the #PinYourThanks campaign, dedicated to thanking essential workers. All profits went to NHS Charities Together and Volunteering Matters. In October 2020, she backed Made By Dyslexia, a global campaign to help teachers address "dyslexic strengths". It has trained a quarter of a million teachers and started an online program. Knightley participated in a skit entitled 2020 The Movie, commemorating Red Nose Day 2021.

=== Fashion endorsements ===
Knightley was the celebrity face for the luxury goods brands Asprey and Shiatzy Chen as well as Lux haircare products in Japanese television commercials. In April 2006, she was confirmed as the new celebrity face of Chanel's perfume Coco Mademoiselle, though the first photo from the campaign was not released until May 2007. Knightley has appeared in television commercials for Chanel directed by Joe Wright since 2007, and has endorsed Chanel Fine Jewellery's collection Coco Crush. In 2008, Knightley was the highest-earning British Hollywood star according to the Forbes Celebrity 100 list and was named amongst the most bankable actors in 2009.

== Personal life ==
Knightley dated actor Del Synnott from 2001 to 2003, beginning when she was 16 years old and Synnott was 24. She also dated actors Jamie Dornan from 2003 to 2005 and Rupert Friend from 2005 to 2010.

Knightley began a relationship with musician James Righton in February 2011. They were married on 4 May 2013 in Mazan, France. They have two daughters together, born in 2015 and 2019. The family resides in Canonbury, Islington, London. Knightley advocates equal paternity leave and has spoken about the expense of childcare in England. She remarked in 2016 on "how lucky I've been to be able to afford really good childcare, otherwise it would be at least four years out of my career." She has no social media profiles in an effort to preserve her family's privacy.

Knightley won a libel case against the Daily Mail in 2007 after it had falsely claimed that she had an eating disorder. Awarded £3,000 in damages, she added to the sum and donated £6,000 to Beat, a charity for those with mental illness and eating disorders.

In February 2010, a 41-year-old man was charged with harassment after trying to contact Knightley on several occasions outside London's Comedy Theatre, where she was performing in The Misanthrope. The subsequent trial folded after she was unavailable to testify in court. Another man was sentenced to eight weeks in prison after harassing Knightley outside her home and stalking her in December 2016.

Knightley is an atheist. In a 2025 interview with Caitlin Moran, when asked how she kept herself from breaking down or developing an addiction due to the pressures of fame, she responded, "Oh, I did go mad, Believe me. I went mad. I just managed to hide it." She recalled various times when men showed up at her doorstep trying to get a reaction from her or following her on the street; after trying to evade them for a while, she took a break from working in 2006, visiting numerous places in Europe and successfully evading paparazzi. In 2018, Knightley revealed that she had a mental breakdown at age 22 and had been later diagnosed with post-traumatic stress disorder (PTSD), since she struggled to adjust to her sudden rise to stardom. She recounted how she did not leave her home for three months up until early 2008, and needed to have hypnotherapy to prevent panic attacks to enable her to attend that year's BAFTA Awards, where she was nominated for her performance in Atonement.

== Recognition and accolades ==
=== Honours ===
Knightley was appointed Officer of the Order of the British Empire (OBE) in the 2018 Birthday Honours for services to drama and charity.

=== Acting awards and nominations ===
Knightley has received two Academy Award nominations: Best Actress for Pride & Prejudice (2005) and Best Supporting Actress for The Imitation Game (2014). She has been nominated at the Golden Globe Awards for the Best Actress – Motion Picture Comedy or Musical, Best Actress – Motion Picture Drama, Best Supporting Actress – Motion Picture categories, for her performances in Pride & Prejudice (2005), Atonement (2007), and The Imitation Game (2014), respectively.

She has twice been nominated at the British Academy Film Awards (BAFTAs): Best Actress in a Leading Role for Atonement (2007), and Best Actress in a Supporting Role for The Imitation Game (2014). She alsp won the Empire Award for Best Actress for her performance in Atonement (2007), after five nominations.

Knightley received a nomination for a Laurence Olivier Award for Best Actress in a Supporting Role in a Play for The Misanthrope.

== Acting credits ==
According to the review aggregator site Rotten Tomatoes, Knightley's most critically successful films are Bend It Like Beckham (2002), Love Actually, (2003), Pirates of the Caribbean: The Curse of the Black Pearl (2003), Pride & Prejudice (2005), Atonement (2007), The Duchess (2008), Never Let Me Go (2010), A Dangerous Method (2011), The Imitation Game (2014), Everest (2015), Colette (2018), Official Secrets (2019), and Misbehaviour (2020). Her television appearances include Oliver Twist (1999), Princess of Thieves (2001), and Doctor Zhivago (2002). On stage, Knightley has starred in The Misanthrope and The Children's Hour at the Harold Pinter Theatre, as well as in Thérèse Raquin at the Roundabout Theatre Company. In 2025 Keira starred in Black Doves on Netflix.

== See also ==
- List of British actors
- List of Academy Award winners and nominees from Great Britain
- List of oldest and youngest Academy Award winners and nominees – Youngest nominees for Best Actress in a Leading Role
- List of actors with Academy Award nominations
- List of actors with more than one Academy Award nomination in the acting categories
- List of atheists in film, radio, television and theatre
