= Galapagos Art Space =

Arts center

Galapagos Art Space was an arts center that moved from Williamsburg to DUMBO in Brooklyn before moving to Detroit, Michigan where it planned to operate as Galapagos Detroit. Its status is currently unknown.

Robert Elmes founded Galapagos Art Space in Williamsburg in 1995 and relocated to DUMBO in 2007. During its more than twenty years in Brooklyn, it hosted nearly 7,500 programs which drew more than one million attendees. Prior to selecting Detroit, the Galapagos founders considered both Bushwick and Berlin as relocation options.

== Brooklyn ==
Galapagos opened in Brooklyn in 1995 but faced the threat of gentrification and rising rents at each of its locations. Their Williamsburg location, a former mayonnaise factory on North 6th Street, is credited with helping to establish the neighborhood as a cultural hub.

Galapagos' DUMBO home was a 1906 former stable at 16 Main Street for which it paid $6.82/square foot when it left Williamsburg in part due to increasing rents. They had a fifteen-year lease. Their space was heavily damaged by Hurricane Sandy in 2012.

Galapagos' DUMBO location featured in Rebecca Serle's In Five Years.

== Galapagos Detroit ==
Prior to announcing Galapagos' move, Elmes and his wife, Philippa Kay, purchased nine buildings in Detroit's Highland Park and Corktown neighborhoods and announced plans for a biennial to launch in 2016. These included an old power plant which would serve as the center point, and another - behind Michigan Central Station - was planned as Commonwealth Detroit. Part of the new funding model which Elmes believed would help them succeed in Detroit was a focus on food and drink to encourage the audience to stay longer. He also planned to rent space to artists.

Less than a year after the Detroit announcement, Elmes announced plans to sell one of the nine buildings he had purchased in the greater Detroit area, leading some to criticize that the move was about real estate, not art.

In early 2019, plans for an arts center in the former Highland Park High School that would have featured an artificial lake fell through, and Elmes sold the building behind Michigan Central Station as well. Plans for the future of Galapagos Detroit were unknown, part of a larger downturn in art plans for the city.
