= Karen Maine =

American film director and screenwriter

- Born: June 15, 1985 (age 41)
- Occupations: Film director, screenwriter, producer, actor
- Known for: Yes, God, Yes, Rosaline

Karen Maine (born June 15, 1985) is an American filmmaker and actress. She is known for directing the films Yes, God, Yes (2019) and Rosaline (2022). She graduated from Eugene Lang College of Liberal Arts.

== Career ==
Maine co-wrote the 2014 film Obvious Child and the 2009 short film it's based on.

Maine wrote and directed the 2019 film Yes, God, Yes starring Natalia Dyer. The film is based on Maine's experiences growing up in Iowa and attending Catholic school for 15 years, where she received a sex-ed curriculum that emphasized not having sex before marriage. Yes, God, Yes premiered at the 2019 SXSW Film Festival and won a Special Jury Award for Best Ensemble. It was released by Vertical Entertainment via virtual theaters on July 24, 2020 and on VOD on July 28, 2020. The film received positive reviews from critics. Richard Brody of The New Yorker said that "Maine uses meticulously composed yet freely imaginative visual and sonic textures to develop the film into a vivid, varied comedic drama and an intricate portrayal of inner experience", Katie Walsh of the Los Angeles Times said that "Maine's film captures something indelible about adolescent female desire, without condescending or objectifying, because she understands, subjectively, what that looks and feels like: all the confusion and shame, but yes, also the pleasure", and Richard Roeper of The Chicago Sun-Times wrote Yes, God, Yes "retains a breezy and upbeat and even sweet disposition, thanks to the light touch of writer-director Karen Maine and an absolutely winning performance by Stranger Things star Natalia Dyer." The film has a 93% approval rating on review aggregator website Rotten Tomatoes, based on 126 reviews. It was included on The New Yorker's list of the best films of 2020.

Maine directed the pilot and the first season of the BBC Three/HBO Max series Starstruck, created by and starring New Zealand comedian Rose Matafeo.

In May 2021 it was announced that Maine would direct the feature film Rosaline, a modern adaptation of Shakespeare's Romeo and Juliet, starring Kaitlyn Dever as Rosaline, Juliet's cousin and Romeo's first love. It was released in 2022 on Hulu.

== Filmography ==
=== Short film ===
Year	Title	Director	Writer	Producer	Actor	Role
2009	Obvious Child	No	Yes	No	Yes	Nellie
2017	Yes, God, Yes	Yes	Yes	Yes	No	—N/a
2023	Two Women on a Bridge	No	No	No	Yes	Katie
2026	Pencils Down	Yes	No	No	No	—N/a

=== Feature film ===
Year	Title	Director	Writer	Executive Producer	Actor	Role
2014	Obvious Child	No	Story	No	Yes	Extra: Planned Parenthood
2019	Yes, God, Yes	Yes	Yes	Yes	No	—N/a
2022	Rosaline	Yes	No	No	No	—N/a

=== Television ===
Year	Title	Director	Executive Producer	Notes
2021	Starstruck	Yes	No	6 episodes; Role as Lonely Girl
2024–26	Nobody Wants This	Yes	No	4 episodes
—N/a	This Summer Will Be Different	Yes	Yes	
