= Rosaline =

Character in Romeo and Juliet

- Romeo and Juliet character
- Paola Tedesco as Rosaline in Franco Zeffirelli's 1968 film, one of the few films to give her a visible role
- Created by: William Shakespeare

In-universe information
- Gender: Female
- Family: Capulet

Rosaline (/ˈrɒzəlaɪn/ ROZ-ə-lyne) is a fictional character mentioned in William Shakespeare's tragedy Romeo and Juliet. A Capulet, she is the cousin of Juliet, niece of Lord Capulet, and Romeo's original romantic interest.

Although an unseen character, her role is important: at the beginning of the play, Romeo's unrequited love for Rosaline leads him to try to catch a glimpse of her at a gathering hosted by the Capulets, during which he spots Juliet and falls in love at first sight with her, leading to all subsequent events in the story. Scholars generally compare Romeo's short-lived love of Rosaline with his later love of Juliet. Scholars believe Romeo's early experience with Rosaline prepares him for his relationship with Juliet, noting that the poetry Shakespeare writes for Rosaline is much weaker than that for Juliet.

Later performances of Romeo and Juliet have painted different pictures of Romeo and Rosaline's relationship, from removing all mentions of her to physically featuring her. Despite her minimal characterization in the play, Rosaline's role has been significantly expanded in numerous retellings.

== Role in the play ==
Before Romeo meets Juliet, he loves Rosaline, Capulet's niece and Juliet's cousin. He describes her as wonderfully beautiful: "The all-seeing sun / ne'er saw her match since first the world begun." Rosaline, however, chooses to remain chaste; Romeo says: "She hath forsworn to love, and in that vow / Do I live dead that live to tell it now." This is the source of his depression, and he makes his friends unhappy; Mercutio comments: "That same pale, hard-hearted wench, that Rosaline, torments him so that he will sure run mad." Benvolio urges Romeo to sneak into a Capulet gathering where, he claims, Rosaline will be perceived like "a crow" alongside the other beautiful women. Romeo agrees, but doubts Benvolio's assessment. After Romeo sees Juliet his feelings suddenly change: "Did my heart love till now? Forswear it, sight / For I ne'er saw true beauty till this night." Because their relationship is sudden and secret, Romeo's friends continue to speak of his affection for Rosaline in Act 1 and briefly at the very beginning of Act 2. Friar Laurence discusses Rosaline in only one major scene—Act 2, Scene 3—when Romeo visits him to ask for help marrying Juliet. After this scene, the Friar shifts his focus entirely to Romeo and Juliet's relationship.

== Analysis ==
=== Name ===
"...Juliet on the balcony ponders Romeo's name and likens it to that rose that remains itself whatever it is called. 'Is Juliet that rose, and, thereby, Rosaline renamed?'"

— Jonathan Goldberg

Rosaline is a variant of Rosalind, a name of Old French origin: (hros = "horse", lind = "soft, tender"). When it was imported into English it was thought to be from the Latin rosa linda ("lovely rose"). Romeo sees Rosaline as the embodiment of the rose because of her name and her apparent perfections. The name Rosaline commonly appears in Petrarchan sonnets, a form of poetry Romeo uses to woo Juliet and to describe both Rosaline and Juliet. Since Rosaline is unattainable, she is a perfect subject for this style; but Romeo's attempt at it is forced and weak. By the time he meets Juliet his poetic ability has improved considerably.

Rosaline is used as a name for only one other Shakespearean character—one of the main female figures in Love's Labour's Lost (1598), and Rosalind is the name of the main female character in As You Like It. Scholars have found similarities between them: both are described as beautiful, and both have a way of avoiding men's romantic advances. Lady Rosaline in Love's Labours Lost constantly rebuffs her suitor's advances and Romeo's Rosaline remains distant and chaste in his brief descriptions of her. These similarities have led Charles and Mary Clarke to wonder whether they are based on a woman Shakespeare actually knew, possibly the Dark Lady described in his sonnets, but there is no strong evidence of this connection.

=== Rosaline as plot device ===
Analysts note that Rosaline acts as a plot device, by motivating Romeo to sneak into the Capulet party where he will meet Juliet. Without her, their meeting would be unlikely. Rosaline thus acts as the impetus to bring the "star-cross'd lovers" to their deaths—she is crucial in shaping their fate (a common theme of the play). Ironically, she remains oblivious of her role.

=== Rosaline and Juliet ===
"Rosaline and Paris...are the subtlest reflectors of all...they are cast like a snake's skin by the more robust reality of Romeo and Juliet."

— Ruth Nevo, on the Rosaline-Juliet, Paris-Romeo comparison

Literary critics often compare Romeo's love for Rosaline with his feelings for Juliet. Some see Romeo's love for Rosaline as childish infatuation as compared with his true love for Juliet. Others argue that the apparent difference in Romeo's feelings shows Shakespeare's improving skill. Since Shakespeare is thought to have written early drafts of the play in 1591, and then picked them up again in 1597 to create the final copy, the change in Romeo's language for Rosaline and Juliet may mirror Shakespeare's increased skill as a playwright: the younger Shakespeare describing Rosaline, and the more experienced describing Juliet. In this view, a careful look at the play reveals that Romeo's love for Rosaline is not as trivial as usually imagined.

Critics also note the ways in which Romeo's relationship with Rosaline prepares him for meeting Juliet. Before meeting Rosaline, Romeo despises all Capulets, but afterwards looks upon them more favorably; he experiences the dual feelings of hate and love in the one relationship. This prepares him for the more mature relationship with Juliet—one fraught by the feud between Montagues and Capulets. Romeo expresses the conflict of love and hate in act 1, scene 1, comparing his love for Rosaline with the feud between the two houses:

Here's much to do with hate, but more with love.
Why, then, O brawling love! O loving hate!
O any thing, of nothing first create!
O heavy lightness! serious vanity!
Misshapen chaos of well-seeming forms!
Feather of lead, bright smoke, cold fire, sick health!
Still-waking sleep, that is not what it is!
This love feel I, that feel no love in this.
Dost thou not laugh?

Psychoanalytic critics see signs of repressed childhood trauma in Romeo's love for Rosaline. She is of a rival house and is sworn to chastity; thus he is in an impossible situation, one which will continue his trauma if he remains in it. Although he acknowledges the ridiculousness of the situation, he refuses to stop loving her. Psychoanalysts view this as a re-enactment of his failed relationship with his mother; Rosaline's absence is symbolic of his mother's absence and lack of affection for him. Romeo's love for Juliet is similarly hopeless, for she is a Capulet and Romeo pursues his relationship with her – the difference being that Juliet reciprocates his feelings.

== Performances ==
Rosaline has been portrayed in various ways over the centuries. Theophilus Cibber's 1748 version of Romeo and Juliet replaced references to Rosaline with references to Juliet. This, according to critics, took out the "love at first sight" moment at the Capulet feast. In the 1750s, actor and theatre director David Garrick also eliminated references to Rosaline from his performances, as many saw Romeo's quick replacement of her as immoral. However, in Franco Zeffirelli's 1968 film version of Romeo and Juliet, Romeo sees Rosaline (played by Paola Tedesco) first at the Capulet feast and then Juliet, of whom he becomes immediately enamoured. This scene suggests that love is short and superficial. Rosaline also appears in Renato Castellani's 1954 film version. In a brief non-Shakespearean scene, Rosaline (Dagmar Josipovitch) gives Romeo a mask at Capulet's celebration, and urges him to leave disguised before harm comes to him. Other filmmakers keep Rosaline off-camera in stricter accordance with Shakespeare's script. Rosaline also appears in the 2013 film adaptation of Romeo and Juliet.

== In popular culture ==
Subsequent works based on the play have experimented with making Rosaline a more prominent character.

Robert Nathan's 1966 romantic comedy, Juliet in Mantua, presents Rosaline as a fully developed character. In this sequel, in which Romeo and Juliet did not die, the pair live ten years later in exile in Mantua. After they are forgiven and return to Verona, they learn that Rosaline is now married to Count Paris, and both couples must confront their disillusionment with their marriages.

Many Romeo and Juliet retellings, particularly those set after the events of the play, depict Benvolio and Rosaline as love interests. In these narratives, their relationship is positioned in contrast to that of Romeo and Juliet. The couple demonstrates greater maturity, make better choices, and ultimately avoid the tragedy of their romantic foils by achieving a happy ending.

The 1999 play, After Juliet, written by Scottish playwright Sharman Macdonald, tells the story of Rosaline after Romeo dies. A main character in this play, she struggles with her loss and turns away the advances of Benvolio, who has fallen in love with her. Macdonald's daughter, Keira Knightley, played Rosaline in the play's 1999 premiere.

Rosaline is the main protagonist of the 2017 American drama series Still Star-Crossed, adapted from Melina Taub's novel of the same name. Rosaline is portrayed by actress Lashana Lynch. In the series, Rosaline is forced to wed Benvolio to end the feud between the Montagues and Capulets.

Prince of Shadows by Rachel Caine and Romeo’s Ex: Rosaline’s Story by Lisa Fiedler are other novels which feature a romance between Benvolio and Rosaline.

Rosaline is a featured role in the 2019 West End musical & Juliet, featured only in the song "Show Me the Meaning of Being Lonely" and is portrayed by Grace Mouat.

The 2022 feature film Rosaline is described as a comedic retelling of Shakespeare's Romeo and Juliet, told from the perspective of Romeo's ex, Rosaline. The film stars Kaitlyn Dever as Rosaline and is directed by Karen Maine.
