= After Juliet =

Play written by Sharman Macdonald

After Juliet is a play written by Scottish playwright Sharman Macdonald. It was commissioned for the 2000 Connections programme, in which regional youth theatre groups compete to stage short plays by established playwrights.

The basic premise of the play, following on from Shakespeare's Romeo and Juliet is "What happened to the Capulets and Montagues after Romeo and Juliet died?". The setting of After Juliet is described as "Verona. Or it could be Edinburgh, Dublin, Birmingham, New York City, or Liverpool. It could be 1500, 1900, 2000, or 3000". The only place that After Juliet cannot be set is Glasgow, as one of the characters, Rhona, is from Glasgow, and away from home.

Macdonald's daughter Keira Knightley appeared in the Heatham House Youth Centre's NT Connections production, which made the regional finals.

It continues to be performed by youth groups around the world.

== Plot ==
The play centres on Rosaline, Juliet's cousin and Romeo's ex-flame. Ironically, Rosaline had been in love with Romeo, but was playing "hard to get". Tortured by the loss of her love, Rosaline has become a sullen, venomous woman. She actively seeks to be elected the 'Princess of Cats' and run the Capulet family.

Meanwhile, the Capulets and Montagues have obeyed Prince Escalus and called a truce. The truce quickly descends into a farce as both sides continue to rage against each other. Amid the turmoil more doomed love springs-between Benvolio Montague and Rosaline. Benvolio is warned by Valentine (Mercutio's twin brother) to stay away from her if he knows what is right.

The climax of the play comes during an election to determine whether or not Rosaline or Petruchio (Tybalt's brother) will succeed Tybalt as the Prince or Princess of Cats. The election fails to have any results and the fate of the truce is left open-ended.

A 2009 youth, stage version of the show featured Valentine as the twin sister of Mercutio; this added an extra storyline where Valentine is in love with Benvolio and is jealous of Rosaline. Benvolio's final scene ends with Valentine running off stage after his rejection.

== Characters ==
- Benvolio, a Montague, Romeo's best friend and cousin
- Valentine, a Montague, Mercutio's twin brother (or sister)
- Rosaline, a Capulet, Juliet's cousin
- Bianca, suffers from petit mal, Juliet's cousin
- Helena, a Capulet, Bianca's sister, Juliet's cousin
- Rhona, a Capulet, a visitor from abroad, Juliet's cousin
- Alice, a Capulet, Juliet's cousin
- Livia, a Capulet, Rosaline's half-sister, Juliet's cousin
- Angelica, a Capulet servant, Juliet's nurse
- Lorenzo, a Capulet
- Gianni, a Capulet, friend/brother to Lorenzo
- Petruchio, a Capulet, Tybalt's brother
- Romeo, a dead Montague (non-speaking)
- Juliet, a dead Capulet
- Drummer, ever present, menacing, a puppeteer of the action
- Musicians
