= Still Star-Crossed =

American period drama television series

- Based on: Still Star-Crossed by Melinda Taub
- Developed by: Heather Mitchell
- Starring: Grant Bowler; Wade Briggs; Torrance Coombs; Dan Hildebrand; Lashana Lynch; Ebonée Noel; Medalion Rahimi; Zuleikha Robinson; Sterling Sulieman; Susan Wooldridge; Anthony Stewart Head
- Composer: Photek
- Country of origin: United States
- Original language: English
- No. of seasons: 1
- No. of episodes: 7

Production
- Executive producers: Shonda Rhimes; Betsy Beers; Heather Mitchell; Michael R. Goldstein; Michael Offer; Mark Wilding
- Producer: José Luis Escolar
- Production location: Spain
- Cinematography: George Steel
- Editors: Gregory T. Evans; Scott Ashby; Matt Ramsey
- Running time: 42–43 minutes
- Production companies: Shondaland; ABC Studios

Original release
- Network: ABC
- Release: May 29 – July 29, 2017

Still Star-Crossed is an American period drama television series developed by Heather Mitchell and based on the 2013 novel of the same name by Melinda Taub, itself a sequel to William Shakespeare's Romeo & Juliet. The series is produced by Shonda Rhimes's Shondaland and ABC Studios, and aired on ABC during the 2016–17 television season. The series premiered on May 29, 2017. ABC canceled the show after one season in June 2017.

== Plot ==
Following the deaths of Romeo and Juliet, Rosaline Capulet is betrothed against her will to Benvolio Montague. As the two try to prevent the marriage and the destruction of their warring families, a secret society known as "The Fiend" attempts to depose the beleaguered Prince Escalus by inciting war between the two families.

== Cast and characters ==
=== Main ===
- Grant Bowler as Lord Damiano Montague, patriarch of the nouveau riche House Montague and Romeo's father who seeks to increase his family's prestige by any means necessary, including undermining House Capulet.
- Wade Briggs as Benvolio Montague, Romeo's wastrel cousin and Lord Montague's nephew who becomes House Montague's heir following Romeo's death.
- Torrance Coombs as Count Paris, the heir to Mantua and the leader of "The Fiends". After being wounded by Romeo and taken in by Lady Capulet, he plans to annex Verona to Mantua by taking a Capulet bride.
- Dan Hildebrand as Friar Lawrence, a Franciscan friar who married Romeo and Juliet on orders from Lord Montague
- Lashana Lynch as Rosaline Capulet, Juliet's cousin and Lord Capulet's niece who becomes House Capulet's heiress following Juliet's death.
- Ebonée Noel as Livia Capulet, Rosaline's sister and Lord Capulet's niece who seeks to marry into a wealthy family, unaware that her aunt plans on using her to legitimize Paris' rule over Verona.
- Medalion Rahimi as Princess Isabella, Escalus' sister and confidant and the Princess of Verona whose primary concern is solving Verona's domestic problems.
- Zuleikha Robinson as Lady Giuliana Capulet, Silvestro's wife and Juliet's mother who aligns House Capulet to the Fiends in exchange for their help in orchestrating House Montague's destruction.
- Sterling Sulieman as Prince Escalus, the Prince of Verona who struggles to maintain control over his beleaguered city and project an image of strength and unity to the world.
- Susan Wooldridge as The Nurse, Juliet's former nurse and a loyal servant to House Capulet.
- Anthony Stewart Head as Lord Silvestro Capulet, patriarch of the aristocratic but impoverished House Capulet and Juliet's father who desires Lord Montague's wedding dowry in order to keep his family from going into bankruptcy

=== Supporting ===
- Lucien Laviscount as Romeo Montague, Lord Montague's only son. He secretly married Juliet, but committed suicide after Juliet faked her death. His body is desecrated by the Fiend in an attempt to incite the Montague to war, which Prince Escalus covers up.
- Clara Rugaard as Juliet Capulet, Lord and Lady Capulet's only daughter. She marries Romeo in secret and eventually commits suicide when Romeo kills himself. Her ghost continues to haunt her parents.
- Gregg Chillin as Mercutio, Romeo and Benvolio's friend and a kinsman of the Prince, slain by Tybalt.
- Shazad Latif as Tybalt Capulet, who killed Mercutio and was slain by Romeo, who was in turn sentenced to death, which caused Juliet to fake her own death.
- Llew Davies as Truccio, a peasant ostensibly in service to House Montague, who turns out to be an agent of the conspiracy.

== Episodes ==
No.	Title	Directed by	Written by	Original release date	US viewers (millions)
1	"In Fair Verona, Where We Lay Our Scene"	Michael Offer	Heather Mitchell	May 29, 2017	2.29 / 0.5 demo
Romeo and Juliet secretly marry, witnessed by Benvolio and Rosaline. That night however, Romeo kills Tybalt and is sentenced to death, while Juliet is promised by her father to Count Paris. Romeo and Juliet each commit suicide, and Paris is left wounded by Romeo. Prince Escalus, who had a previous relationship with Rosaline, returns to the city after years in Venice. He hopes to make peace between the Capulets and Montagues to prevent the city being conquered by its powerful neighbors. His calls for unity at Romeo and Juliet's funeral fail when a statue of Juliet commissioned by the Montagues as a gift to the Capulets is vandalized with the word "Harlot" by an unknown agitator. The two sides come to blows, which spirals into a city-wide riot. Title Reference: Romeo and Juliet (Act I, Prologue)
2	"The Course of True Love Never Did Run Smooth"	Jonathan Jones	Raamla Mohamed	June 5, 2017	1.97 / 0.5 demo
Despite Escalus and Rosaline's feelings for each other, he orders that she marry Benvolio to ensure peace in Verona. Lord Capulet is secretly deeply in debt, which Lord Montague learns and plots to turn to his advantage. Guiliana becomes convinced that Rosaline masterminded Juliet's death. Livia takes desperate measures to heal Paris' wounds. Title Reference: A Midsummer Night's Dream (Act I, Scene I)
3	"All the World's a Stage"	Jonathan Jones	Rebecca Kirsch	June 19, 2017	1.61 / 0.3 demo
With the eyes of Verona's neighbours on them, Rosaline and Benvolio play the part of a lovestruck couple. However, a mysterious faction threaten the public betrothal ceremony. Meanwhile, a rift begins to develop between Escalus and Isabella. Lord Montague plots to undermine the Capulets by taking over the financing of a grand cathedral. Guiliana descends deeper into madness, and Lord Capulet begins to lose his own grip on reality. Livia and a recovering Paris grow closer. Title Reference: As You Like It (Act II, Scene VII)
4	"Pluck Out the Heart of My Mystery"	Ericson Core	Linda Gase	July 8, 2017	0.92 / 0.2 demo
After their betrothal ceremony is attacked by a masked Truccio, Benvolio and Rosaline realise a conspiracy is attempting to foment war. However, in the course of their investigation Benvolio is framed for murder. Lady Capulet discovers the potion Juliet used to fake her death among Rosaline's belongings. Friar Lawrence flees the city after hearing the Nurse's confession. Title Reference: Hamlet (Act III, Scene II)
5	"Nature Hath Framed Strange Fellows in Her Time"	Ericson Core	Brian Stampnitsky & Christina M. Walker	July 15, 2017	0.93 / 0.2 demo
A desperate Benvolio chases Friar Lawrence to a monastery two days from Verona, believing the friar has evidence that will prove his innocence. Rosaline accompanies him, and their feelings towards each other soften during their time together. Meanwhile, in Venice, Isabella attempts to get the hedonistic Doge to formalise his alliance with Verona without trading her virginity. Title Reference: The Merchant of Venice (Act I, Scene I)
6	"Hell is Empty and All the Devils Are Here"	Tom Verica	Curtis Kheel	July 22, 2017	0.88 / 0.2 demo
Back in Verona during the events of the previous episode, Paris re-emerges and sets his plans to become Prince of Verona into motion, while the Fiends step up their campaign of terror. Benvolio is assumed to have kidnapped Rosaline, and Escalus leaves the city to personally rescue her. Meanwhile, Lords Capulet and Montague struggle for control of the cathedral. Title Reference: The Tempest (Act I, Scene II)
7	"Something Wicked This Way Comes"	Clark Johnson	Heather Mitchell	July 29, 2017	0.88 / 0.2 demo
Benvolio is captured and accused of Paris' crimes. Rosaline is forced to bear witness against Benvolio when Paris threatens Livia's life. Rosaline is able to meet privately with Escalus and tell him of Benvolio's innocence, but as Benvolio's guilt is personally and politically advantageous for him, Escalus refuses to release Benvolio without proof. Paris elopes with Livia, and Benvolio resigns himself to his fate. Rosaline is unable to find evidence of Benvolio's innocence, but bitterly tells Escalus that her word should be enough. A guilt-stricken Lady Montague tells her husband of the plot, but they are detained by Fiends before they can warn Escalus. On the day of Benvolio's execution, Escalus reprieves Benvolio, however, the Fiends attack, mortally wounding Escalus, while Paris and his army mass outside the city walls. Title Reference: Macbeth (Act IV, Scene I)

== Production ==
=== Development ===
On October 22, 2015, it was announced that Grey's Anatomy and Scandal writer Heather Mitchell was developing a new drama for ABC billed as a sequel to William Shakespeare's Romeo and Juliet. Still Star-Crossed is based on the book by Melinda Taub. Shonda Rhimes and Betsy Beers executive produce the series with Shondaland, ABC Studios and Michael R. Goldstein's The MrG Production Company. On January 21, 2016, ABC ordered the pilot for the 2016–17 television season.

Michael Offer, who directed the pilot episode for Shondaland's How to Get Away with Murder, has been tapped to direct Still Star-Crossed. The pilot was filmed in Salamanca, located in the province of Castile and León, north-western Spain, from April 18, 2016 to May 2, 2016, and Plasencia and Cáceres, located in the autonomous community of Extremadura, western Spain. On May 12, 2016, ABC ordered the pilot to series.

=== Casting ===
Casting advertisement began in March 2016. On March 2, 2016, it was announced that Zuleikha Robinson, Lashana Lynch, Torrance Coombs, Wade Briggs and Ebonée Noel were cast in series regular roles. British actress Lashana Lynch was cast as the series' lead character, Rosaline Capulet, Juliet's cousin. Robinson plays Lady Capulet, Briggs plays Rosaline' male lead, newcomer Noel plays her sister, and Coombs plays antagonist. On March 15, 2016, it was announced that Medalion Rahimi, who debuted on ShondaLand's The Catch, was cast as Princess Isabella. On March 18, 2016, Sterling Sulieman joined the pilot as Prince Escalus. On March 22, 2016, Dan Hildebrand was signed to play Friar Lawrence. On April 7, 2016, it was announced that Grant Bowler would play Lord Montague, and a day later Anthony Head was cast as Lord Capulet. British actor Lucien Laviscount and Danish actress Clara Rugaard were cast in guest-starring roles as Romeo and Juliet.

== Reception ==
The series received mixed reviews. On review aggregator website Rotten Tomatoes the series has an approval rating of 52% based on 25 reviews, with an average rating of 5.5/10. Its critical consensus states: "Still Star-Crossed stumbles out of the gate, dishonoring its Shakespearean roots with lavishly staged but ultimately empty melodrama." On Metacritic, the series has a score of 45 out of 100, based on 13 critics, indicating "mixed or average reviews".

=== Ratings ===
Viewership and ratings per episode of Still Star-Crossed
No.	Title	Air date	Viewers (millions)
1	"In Fair Verona, Where We Lay Our Scene"	May 29, 2017	2.29
2	"The Course of True Love Never Did Run Smooth"	June 5, 2017	1.97
3	"All the World's a Stage"	June 19, 2017	1.61
4	"Pluck Out the Heart of My Mystery"	July 8, 2017	0.92
5	"Nature Hath Framed Strange Fellows in Her Time"	July 15, 2017	0.93
6	"Hell is Empty and All the Devils Are Here"	July 22, 2017	0.88
7	"Something Wicked This Way Comes"	July 29, 2017	0.88

=== Awards and nominations ===
Year	Award	Category	Nominee(s)	Result	Ref.
2018	16th Visual Effects Society Awards	Outstanding Created Environment in an Episode, Commercial, or Real-Time Project	Rafael Solorzano, Isaac de la Pompa, Jose Luis Barreiro, Oscar Perea for "The City"	Nominated	
