= Rosaline (film) =

2022 film by Karen Maine

- Official release poster
- Directed by: Karen Maine
- Screenplay by: Scott Neustadter; Michael H. Weber
- Based on: When You Were Mine by Rebecca Serle; Characters from Romeo and Juliet by William Shakespeare
- Produced by: Shawn Levy; Dan Cohen; Dan Levine
- Starring: Kaitlyn Dever; Isabela Merced; Kyle Allen; Sean Teale; Christopher McDonald; Minnie Driver; Bradley Whitford
- Cinematography: Laurie Rose
- Edited by: Jennifer Lee
- Music by: Drum & Lace; Ian Hultquist
- Production companies: 20th Century Studios; 21 Laps Entertainment
- Distributed by: Hulu (United States); Disney+ (International; Via Star); Star+ (Latin America)
- Release dates: October 6, 2022 (El Capitan Theatre); October 14, 2022 (United States)
- Running time: 96 minutes
- Country: United States
- Language: English

Rosaline is a 2022 American romantic comedy film directed by Karen Maine, written by Scott Neustadter and Michael H. Weber, and starring Kaitlyn Dever, Isabela Merced, Kyle Allen, Sean Teale, Christopher McDonald, Minnie Driver, and Bradley Whitford. It is based on the 2012 young adult novel When You Were Mine by Rebecca Serle, which in turn was inspired by William Shakespeare's Romeo and Juliet.

The film had its world premiere on October 6, 2022, at the El Capitan Theatre and was released on October 14, 2022, on Hulu in the United States, Disney+ internationally and Star+ in Latin America. The film was removed from Disney+ on May 26, 2023, but was later made available digitally on September 26, 2023. Although visually a period costume film, the dialogue uses modern English and slang.

== Plot ==
Rosaline is an independent-minded, unconventional young lady from the House Capulet. She has been secretly seeing Romeo, a member of the Capulets' rivals, the Montagues, and arranges to meet him at the Capulet masquerade ball. Rosaline misses the ball after a meeting with a potential suitor, Dario Penza, introduced by her father, leads to them becoming trapped on a boat in a storm and she rudely rejects his courtship; meanwhile, at the ball, Romeo meets and becomes smitten with Rosaline's cousin Juliet. Next day, after Romeo does not arrive to see her, Rosaline follows him and sees him wooing Juliet.

Lord and Lady Capulet call on Rosaline's father Adrian, taking with them Juliet and her cousin Tybalt. Rosaline tells Juliet that she knows of Juliet's romance with Romeo and lies about Romeo romancing many other women. Then, she takes Juliet out to a cheap bar to meet men, hoping to make her forget about Romeo. Rosaline becomes dismayed when Romeo does not reply to her letters. She then discovers letters he has written to Juliet, which she takes. Finding Juliet expecting Romeo, Rosaline encourages her to reject him and he leaves, but Juliet sees Rosaline's necklace engraved with Romeo's and Rosaline's names and realizes that her cousin has lied to her.

Rosaline convinces her friend Count Paris that he can distract attention from his homosexuality by courting Juliet; the Capulets heartily accept the suit, much to Juliet's dismay. Rosaline finds a letter from Romeo to Juliet asking her to elope with him. Rosaline grudgingly accepts Dario as an escort when she ventures out to infiltrate the Montague estate after dark, intending to stop the wedding, but they are seen by guards and pursued; after Dario fights off the guards, they escape on horseback, but fail to stop the wedding. Rosaline's attitude to Dario softens, but Dario tells Rosaline he will be leaving next day to rejoin the navy.

Accepting what has happened, Rosaline sends Romeo's letters back to Juliet, but her message is intercepted by Tybalt who challenges Romeo to a duel. Romeo kills Tybalt, and both fathers angrily demand that Romeo and Juliet's marriage be annulled, and declare war on each other.

Rosaline goes to apologise to Dario and asks him to help Romeo and Juliet leave the country in his boat. They go to Juliet's room to tell her, only to learn that Juliet has already carried out her plan to fake her death by drinking a potion. Later, Rosaline arrives at Juliet's body to find Romeo with her but still alive, as Dario had informed him of the plan. Rosaline tells Romeo to also pretend to be dead, and scolds the arriving Montagues and Capulets for having caused this by their feud. The families reconcile and depart. Rosaline and Dario see Romeo and Juliet off in Dario's boat before sharing a kiss.

In a mid-credits scene, Romeo and Juliet on the boat trip struggle to find common interests.

== Cast ==
- Kaitlyn Dever as Rosaline
- Isabela Merced as Juliet
- Kyle Allen as Romeo
- Sean Teale as Dario Penza
- Christopher McDonald as Lord Capulet
- Minnie Driver as Nurse Janet
- Bradley Whitford as Adrian Capulet, Rosaline's father
- Spencer Stevenson as Paris
- Nico Hiraga as Steve the Courier
- Alistair Toovey as Tybalt
- Alhaji Fofana as Benvolio
- Nicholas Rowe as Lord Montague
- Miloud Mourad Benamara as the Custodian
- Lew Temple as Mr. Danieli

== Production ==
In May 2021, it was announced that 20th Century Studios had picked up the film, after initially starting development over at MGM. It was also announced that Karen Maine had been hired to direct the film based on a screenplay by Scott Neustadter and Michael H. Weber, which in turn is based on the 2012 young adult novel When You Were Mine by Rebecca Serle.

That same month, Kaitlyn Dever was cast in the title role. Later in June 2021, Isabela Merced was cast as Juliet. In July 2021, Kyle Allen was cast as Romeo. That same month, Bradley Whitford was cast. In August, Minnie Driver signed on to play a take on the Nurse from the original story.

Filming began in Tuscany, Italy, in September 2021 and concluded that October.

== Music ==
Drum & Lace and Ian Hultquist were attached to compose the film by May 2022. The two used instruments such as the harpsichord, lute, wooden flutes, and Renaissance drums alongside contemporary instruments like drum machines and analog and soft synths for the score, which was recorded in New York City. The two also had a 15-piece string ensemble.

== Marketing ==
First look images were revealed on August 11, 2022. The official trailer was released on September 22, 2022, set to Icona Pop's 2012 song "I Love It". Writing for IndieWire, Samantha Bergeson stated that "Rosaline in part acts as a who's-who of Gen Z Hollywood", citing Dever, Merced, and Allen starring in the upcoming films Ticket to Paradise, Madame Web, and the then-cancelled live action Masters of the Universe, respectively.

== Release ==
Rosaline had its world premiere on October 6, 2022, at the El Capitan Theatre. The film was released on October 14, 2022, on Hulu in the United States, Disney+ internationally, Disney+ Hotstar in Southeast Asia and Star+ in Latin America. Disney announced that Rosaline would stream on Disney+ in the US but limited for 5 days, which would start from February 10 to 15. It is no longer available on Disney+ in the US, but it is currently available digitally on other platforms, including Amazon Prime Video, Vudu and Google Play as of September 26, 2023.

== Reception ==
=== Audience viewership ===
According to Whip Media, Rosaline was the sixth most streamed movie across all platforms in the United States during the week of October 16, 2022, and the 8th most streamed movie across all platforms in the United States during the week of October 21, 2022.

=== Critical response ===
On the review aggregator website Rotten Tomatoes, 75% of 83 critics' reviews are positive, with an average rating of 6.5/10. The website's consensus reads: "Rosaline covers well-trod territory, but Kaitlyn Dever's engaging performance in the title role makes this period romance easy to love." Metacritic assigned the film a weighted average score of 61 out of 100 based on 17 critics, indicating "generally favorable reviews".
