= Coastal Elites =

2020 American television special

- Film poster
- Written by: Paul Rudnick
- Directed by: Jay Roach
- Starring: Bette Midler; Kaitlyn Dever; Dan Levy; Sarah Paulson; Issa Rae
- Country of origin: United States
- Original language: English

Production
- Executive producers: Paul Rudnick; Jay Roach; Jeffrey Seller; Flody Suarez; Michelle Graham; Scott Chaloff
- Producer: Emily Cohen
- Cinematography: Jim Denault
- Editor: Jon Poll
- Running time: 88 minutes
- Production companies: Delirious Media; Seller Suarez Productions; HBO Films

Original release
- Network: HBO
- Release: September 12, 2020

Coastal Elites is a 2020 American comedy television film directed by Jay Roach and written by Paul Rudnick. The film stars Bette Midler, Sarah Paulson, Kaitlyn Dever, Dan Levy and Issa Rae as five people living in either New York City or Los Angeles, navigating the COVID-19 pandemic.

Coastal Elites premiered on HBO on September 12, 2020 to mixed reviews from critics.

== Cast ==
- Bette Midler as Miriam Nessler
- Kaitlyn Dever as Sharynn Tarrows
- Dan Levy as Mark Hesterman
- Sarah Paulson as Clarissa Montgomery
- Issa Rae as Callie Josephson

== Production ==
In June 2020, it was announced Bette Midler, Sarah Paulson, Kaitlyn Dever, Dan Levy and Issa Rae had joined the cast of the film, with Jay Roach directing from a screenplay by Paul Rudnick. The project was shot remotely.

== Reception ==
On review aggregator website Rotten Tomatoes, the film holds an approval rating of 52% based on 21 reviews, with an average rating of 5.7/10. The website's critics consensus reads, "The top-shelf cast gives Coastal Elites a passionate pulse, but redundant speechifying and the stilted format result in a repetitive preaching to the choir." Metacritic assigned the film a weighted average score of 57 out of 100, based on 20 critics, indicating "mixed or average" reviews.
