= Lashana Lynch =

British actress (born 1987)

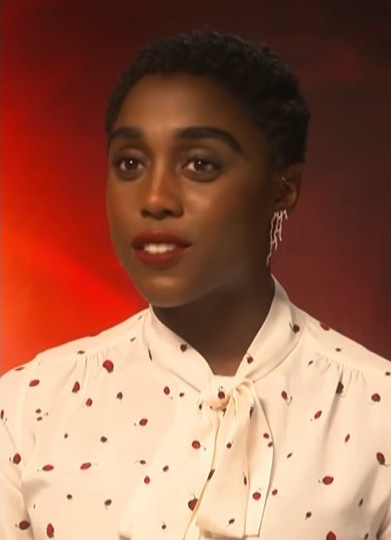
- Lynch in 2019
- Born: 27 November 1987 (age 38); Hammersmith, London, England
- Education: Arts Educational School
- Occupation: Actress
- Years active: 2007–present
- Spouse: Zackary Momoh

Lashana Lynch (born 27 November 1987) is a British actress. After various roles in film and television, she gained international recognition portraying Maria Rambeau in Marvel Cinematic Universe (MCU) films beginning with Captain Marvel (2019). She starred as the first Black female 007 agent in the James Bond film No Time to Die (2021) and won the BAFTA Rising Star Award in 2022.

She has also appeared in the films Matilda the Musical (2022), The Woman King (2022), and Bob Marley: One Love (2024) and has starred in the television series Still Star-Crossed (2017) and The Day of the Jackal (2024).

== Early life ==
Lynch was born on 27 November 1987 in Shepherd's Bush, London. She is of Jamaican descent. She attended Twyford CofE High School, where she played netball for the county, and ArtsEd drama school in London.

== Career ==
Lynch made her onscreen debut with a minor role on an episode of ITV's The Bill in 2007. In 2012, she made her film debut in the drama film Fast Girls where she portrayed a runner from a British team nominated for the World Athletics Championships. The movie was presented at the 2012 Cannes Film Festival. A year later she appeared in the film Powder Room (2013), and also appeared in the BBC television show Silent Witness (2013). In 2014, she appeared in the BBC television film The 7.39 with David Morrissey, Olivia Colman and Sheridan Smith. That same year she also had a role in an episode of Atlantis (2014).

In 2015, she was a cast member on the short-lived BBC comedy Crims (2015), and appeared in an episode of Death in Paradise (2015). That same year she starred opposite Lenny Henry in the titular role of the Chichester Festival Theatre production of Educating Rita by Willy Russell, which played in the Minerva Theatre, Chichester from 18 June to 25 July; The Guardian's review described her as "dazzlingly fresh". In 2016, she appeared in Brotherhood, and two episodes on the British medical soap opera Doctors. That same year she was cast as the leading character Rosaline Capulet in the American period drama series Still Star-Crossed (2017), produced by Shonda Rhimes. The series premiered on May 29, 2017 but was later cancelled in June. In 2018, she joined the cast of the pilot episode of Y: The Last Man as Agent 355, but was later replaced by Ashley Romans in the main series. That year she starred in Bulletproof; her role was later recast due to scheduling conflicts.

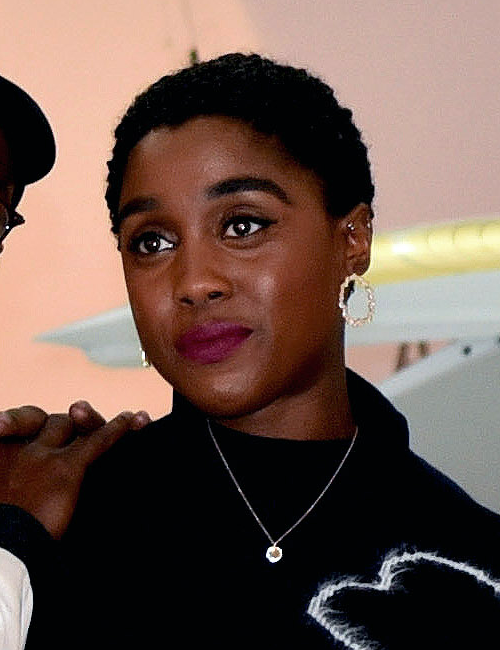
Lynch (pictured) in 2019 visiting the Edwards Air Force Base with the cast of Captain Marvel

In March 2018, Lynch was reported to have replaced DeWanda Wise for a role in then-upcoming Marvel Cinematic Universe (MCU) film Captain Marvel opposite Brie Larson and Samuel L. Jackson. The film was released in 2019 and became the fifth-highest-grossing film of the year making over $1.1 billion worldwide. Lynch portrayed Maria Rambeau; an Air Force pilot, best friend to Carol Danvers and single mother of Monica Rambeau. In 2020, she also appeared in the British science fiction comedy The Intergalactic Adventures of Max Cloud with Scott Adkins and John Hannah. In 2021, Lynch portrayed Nomi, the new 007 agent, alongside Daniel Craig the retired 007 agent James Bond, in the James Bond film franchise entry No Time to Die (2021); the change to a Black woman holding the 007 designation in the franchise drew international headlines. Lynch has said that she received hate from racist online trolls due to her casting, causing her to delete her Instagram account. That year she also starred in Ear for Eye (2021).

In 2022, Lynch portrayed an alternate version of Maria Rambeau, who became her universe's Captain Marvel, in the MCU film Doctor Strange in the Multiverse of Madness (2022). The same year, Lynch also played veteran warrior, Izogie, in the historical epic, The Woman King, about the Agojie, the all-female military unit of the Kingdom of Dahomey, one of the most powerful states of Africa in the 18th and 19th centuries. She also starred as Miss Honey in Matilda the Musical (2022). At the end of 2023, Lynch reprised her role as Rambeau in the MCU film The Marvels during a flashback scene, and also made a cameo appearance in the end-credits scene as a version of Rambeau who became the superhero Binary, working alongside Kelsey Grammer's Beast.

In 2024, Lynch starred as Rita Marley in the Bob Marley biopic, Bob Marley: One Love, along with Kingsley Ben-Adir and directed by Reinaldo Marcus Green. She also co-starred in The Day of the Jackal (2024) alongside Eddie Redmayne, which earned her a nomination for the Critics' Choice Award for Best Actress in an Action Series. In May 2026, Lynch was the voice actress and also used as the likeness for the main character of the video game Directive 8020.

=== Upcoming projects ===
In 2025, Lynch was cast in the upcoming film Children of Blood and Bone, set for release in 2027. She is set to star in a sequel series for Peaky Blinders alongside Jamie Bell and Charlie Heaton. Production began in March 2026.

== Filmography ==
Key
†	Denotes films that have not yet been released

=== Film ===
Film appearances
Year	Title	Role	Notes	Ref.
2012	Fast Girls	Belle Newman		
2013	Powder Room	Laura		
2016	Brotherhood	Ashanti		
2019	Captain Marvel	Maria Rambeau		
2020	The Intergalactic Adventures of Max Cloud	Shee		
2021	No Time to Die	Nomi		
2021	Ear for Eye	US Female		
2022	Doctor Strange in the Multiverse of Madness	Maria Rambeau / Captain Marvel (Earth-838)		
2022	The Woman King	Izogie		
2022	Matilda the Musical	Miss Honey		
2023	The Marvels	Maria Rambeau / Binary	Cameo	
2024	Bob Marley: One Love	Rita Marley		
2027	Children of Blood and Bone †	Jumboke	Post-production	

=== Television ===
Television appearances
Year	Title	Role	Notes	Ref.
2007	The Bill	Precious Miller	Episode: "Man Down"	
2013	Silent Witness	Shona Benson	2 episodes	
2014	The 7.39	Kerry Wright	Television film	
2014	Atlantis	Areto	Episode: "Telemon"	
2015	Death in Paradise	Jasmine Laymon	Episode: "The Perfect Murder"	
2015	Crims	Gemma	5 episodes	
2016	Doctors	Leah Gattis	2 episodes	
2017	Still Star-Crossed	Rosaline Capulet	Main role	
2018	Bulletproof	Arjana Pike	6 episodes	
2024	The Day of the Jackal	Bianca Pullman	Main role	
TBA	Untitled Peaky Blinders Sequel †	TBA	In production	

=== Video game ===
Year	Title	Role	Notes	Ref.
2026	Directive 8020	Brianna Young	Voice	

== Stage ==
Year	Title	Role	Notes	Refs.
2015	Educating Rita	Rita	Minerva Theatre, Chichester	

== Accolades ==
Award	Year	Category	Work(s)	Result	Ref.
Black Reel Awards	2025	Outstanding Supporting Performance	Bob Marley: One Love	Nominated	
British Academy Film Awards	2021	Rising Star Award	Herself	Won	
Critics' Choice Awards	2023	Best Acting Ensemble	The Woman King	Nominated	
Critics' Choice Super Awards	2022	Best Actress in an Action Movie	No Time to Die	Nominated	
Critics' Choice Super Awards	2025	Best Actress in an Action Series, Limited Series or Made-for-TV Movie	The Day of the Jackal	Nominated	
Essence Black Women in Hollywood	2020	Award of Honour	Herself	Honour	
Girls on Film Award	2023	Best Ensemble Acting	The Woman King	Won	
MOBO Awards	2022	Best Performance in a TV Show/Film	No Time to Die	Nominated	
NAACP Image Awards	2022	Outstanding Actress in a Motion Picture	The Woman King	Nominated	
NAACP Image Awards	2022	Outstanding Ensemble Cast in a Motion Picture	The Woman King	Nominated	
NAACP Image Awards	2025	Outstanding Actress in a Motion Picture	Bob Marley: One Love	Nominated	
NAACP Image Awards	2025	Outstanding Ensemble Cast in a Motion Picture	Bob Marley: One Love	Nominated	
San Diego Film Critics Society	2022	Best Supporting Actress	The Woman King	Nominated	
Screen Actors Guild Awards	2025	Outstanding Performance by an Ensemble in a Drama Series	The Day of the Jackal	Nominated	
