= Second Coming (film) =

- Directed by: Debbie Tucker Green
- Written by: Debbie Tucker Green
- Produced by: Polly Leys; Kate Norrish
- Starring: Idris Elba; Nadine Marshall
- Cinematography: Ula Pontikos
- Edited by: Mark Eckersley
- Music by: Luke Sutherland
- Production company: Hillbilly Films
- Distributed by: Film4; BFI; Film Movement
- Release dates: 7 September 2014 (Toronto International Film Festival); 5 June 2015
- Running time: 105 minutes
- Country: United Kingdom
- Language: English
- Box office: $235,861

Second Coming is a 2014 British drama film directed by debbie tucker green. It is written in the style of magical realism and the dialogue is often unspecific and ambiguous. The narrative revolves around a woman who becomes pregnant under unusual circumstances and the drama that this creates with her family and friends. It received mostly positive reviews from critics and was nominated for a BAFTA Award for Outstanding Debut by a British Writer, Director or Producer. Because of the genre and its subtlety, some reviewers expressed confusion about elements of the film.

== Plot ==
Jacqueline Trent (Jackie), a social worker, learns that she is eight weeks pregnant. Meanwhile her son, Jerome (JJ), distractingly draws symbols of wings on the misty windows at school. (Other bird symbols subtly appear throughout the film.) His German teacher asks JJ in German, "Which color is the bus, red or black... which color is it now?" Later Lauryn, his older schoolmate, says she thinks German isn't even a proper language, dismissing the teacher's ambiguously racist comments while trying to comfort JJ. Later JJ feeds a surprisingly friendly magpie and subsequently he shows Lauryn how he can get another wild bird to hop into his hands. The bird becomes injured when Lauryn handles it too roughly. JJ tries to rehabilitate the injured bird but it dies. He solemnly buries it in the backyard.

Jackie discusses her pregnancy with Bernie, her friend and coworker, as well as JJ’s godmother, using indirect terms arguing whether she should continue the pregnancy. Her husband, Mark, senses that something is wrong as she continues to be less intimate in bed and generally more worrisome and pensive. As she sits in the bathroom, water falls on her from nowhere. (This symbolic bathroom scene occurs three times during the movie, each time with more intensity until finally she's facing a monsoon.)

Another coworker comments on how he believes that the clients they serve in the welfare office are racist and ignorant. Bernie questions Jackie's honesty and sanity regarding Jackie's claim about the origins of the pregnancy. (Jackie's beliefs about the pregnancy, as well as its exact origins remain uncertain to the audience until the end of the film.)

Mark finds out about Jackie's pregnancy from JJ, who can apparently see the baby in his mother's womb. Mark becomes distressed and concerned because of her previous pregnancies that had miscarried. Using indirect language and incomplete sentences, he angrily questions Jackie about the pregnancy while JJ and Lauryn listen. He points out that they have not been intimate for some time and that the conception occurred during the couple's abstinence.

Shortly following Mark's rebuke late in the pregnancy, in a moment of deep despair, Jackie attempts to harm herself with a sharp instrument. She and the baby survive after Mark rushes them to the hospital. JJ gets in a fight with a boy at school after Lauryn tells their schoolmates about the situation. Jackie undergoes compulsory counseling where she is questioned about her visions and her belief that she is giving birth to the Second Coming. Mark and Jackie separate.

A year later, Mark and Jackie resurrect their relationship during the baby's first birthday party at their house. They watch the baby learning to walk. Without saying a word, JJ carries the baby over to the grave of the bird that JJ had tried to rehabilitate. The baby lays her hands on the grave and the bird comes back to life, emerges from the earth and flies away.

== Cast ==
- Nadine Marshall as Jacqueline Jackie ("Jax") - Wife
- Idris Elba as Mark - Husband
- Kai Francis Lewis as Jerome 'JJ' - Son
- Sharlene Whyte as Bernie - Jax’s coworker, friend and confidant
- Llewella Gideon as Jax's Mum
- Larrington Walker s Jax's Dad
- Bailey Patrick as Justin
- Maxwell Sutton as Simon - fighting boy
- Seroca Davis as Sandra - Jax’s sister, with whom she has a contentious relationship
- Kenia-Mae McIntosh and Ave-Maria Okonkwo as the baby
- Nicola Walker as the Counselor
- Janelle Frimpong as Lauryn
- Gershwyn Eustache Jnr as Patrick
- Nick Figgis as Alex
- Arinda Alexander as Manjeet
- Anna Brooks-Beckman as Maddy
- Anthony Welsh as Levi
- Simon Robson as Jim
- David Fernandez as Lewis
- Fredrich Schmidt as Jason
- Alex Lanipekun as Michael
- Naveed Khan as Revinder
- Joanna Bending as Restaurant Mum

== Release ==
Second Coming premiered at the Toronto International Film Festival in September 2014 and is distributed by Film Movement in the US. It was released on DVD in the UK, on 6 July 2015.

== Reception ==
On Rotten Tomatoes the film has an approval rating of 76% based on reviews from 21 critics.

Variety praised the film, saying: "Idris Elba and Nadine Marshall excel in Debbie Tucker Green's oblique, engrossing psychodrama."

The Guardian awarded it four out of five stars, saying: "The pure fear that Marshall wordlessly suggests is superb."

The Telegraph awarded it three out of five stars, saying: "while this is an uneven, imperfect film, it's still an unusual and interesting one: a slice of modern British bleakness, with just enough strangeness to keep things fresh."

Empire awarded it three out of five stars, calling it: "A soulful drama that heralds the arrival of a new voice in British cinema."

The London Evening Standard also awarded it three out of five stars, saying: "Thank goodness for Idris Elba, whose beauty and star power will ensure this brazenly weird romantic drama from London playwright Debbie Tucker Green doesn't get brushed aside."

Time Out awarded it four out of five stars, saying" "‘Second Coming’ is sometimes confusing, but always compelling and often powerful."

== Awards ==
The film was nominated for a BAFTA Award for Outstanding Debut by a British Writer, Director or Producer.
