= Ear for Eye =

2021 British film by debbie tucker green

- Film poster
- Directed by: debbie tucker green
- Written by: debbie tucker green
- Produced by: Fiona Lamptey
- Starring: Lashana Lynch; Tosin Cole; Carmen Munroe; Danny Sapani; Nadine Marshall; Arinzé Kene; Jade Anouka
- Edited by: Mdhamiri Á Nkemi
- Production companies: BBC Film; British Film Institute; Fruit Tree Media; Eon Productions
- Distributed by: BBC
- Release dates: 16 October 2021 (LFF); 16 October 2021
- Running time: 88 minutes
- Country: United Kingdom
- Language: English

Ear for Eye (stylized as ear for eye) is a 2021 British drama film, written and directed by debbie tucker green, based upon her play of the same name. It stars Lashana Lynch, Tosin Cole, Carmen Munroe, Danny Sapani, Nadine Marshall, Arinzé Kene and Jade Anouka. Like the play, the characters are anonymous members of anonymous British and American families, telling their stories of the racial injustice experienced by Black citizens; in the play, they are simply identified as Mom, Dad, Woman and so on, though the film credits add UK or US to these identifiers.

The film had its world premiere at the BFI London Film Festival on 16 October 2021, and aired on the BBC on the same day.

== Cast ==
- Sharlene Whyte as US Mom
- David Gyasi as US Dad
- Carmen Munroe as US Elder Woman
- Jade Anouka as UK Woman
- Danny Sapani as US Adult
- Tosin Cole as US Young Adult
- Ronkẹ Adékọluẹ́jọ́ as UK Friend 1
- Danielle Vitalis as UK Friend 2
- Nadine Marshall as UK Mum
- Arinzé Kene as UK Man
- Nakhane as US They/Them
- Lashana Lynch as US Female
- Demetri Goritsas as US Male

== Production ==
In December 2020, it was announced Lashana Lynch, Tosin Cole, Carmen Munroe, Danny Sapani, Nadine Marshall, Arinzé Kene and Jade Anouka had joined the cast of the film, with debbie tucker green directing from a screenplay she wrote. Barbara Broccoli would serve as an executive producer under her Eon Productions banner.

Principal photography took place at Kennington Film Studios in London, and concluded by December 2020.

== Release ==
The film had its world premiere at the BFI London Film Festival on 16 October 2021, and was also aired that same day on BBC.
