= Yes, God, Yes =

2019 film by Karen Maine

- Theatrical release poster
- Directed by: Karen Maine
- Written by: Karen Maine
- Produced by: Katie Cordeal; Colleen Hammond; Eleanor Columbus; Rodrigo Teixeira
- Starring: Natalia Dyer; Timothy Simons; Wolfgang Novogratz; Francesca Reale; Susan Blackwell; Parker Wierling; Alisha Boe; Donna Lynne Champlin
- Cinematography: Todd Antonio Somodevilla
- Edited by: Jennifer Lee
- Music by: Ian Hultquist
- Production companies: Maiden Voyage Pictures; RT Features; Highland Film Group
- Distributed by: Vertical Entertainment
- Release dates: March 8, 2019 (SXSW); July 24, 2020 (United States)
- Running time: 78 minutes
- Country: United States
- Language: English
- Box office: $305

Yes, God, Yes is a 2019 American coming-of-age comedy-drama film written and directed by Karen Maine and starring Natalia Dyer. It is Maine's directorial debut, based on her 2017 short film of the same name, also starring Dyer.

Yes, God, Yes premiered at the SXSW Film Festival on March 8, 2019, where it received a special jury prize for best ensemble. The film had limited theatrical release in drive-in theaters and virtual cinemas in the United States on July 24, 2020, by Vertical Entertainment, before launching digitally and on video on demand on July 28, 2020; subsequently, it was also made available on Netflix on October 22, 2020.

== Plot ==
It is the fall of 2000. Alice is a sexually inexperienced but curious junior at a strict Midwestern co-ed Catholic high school, where Father Murphy instructs her Morality class that any sexual activity not aimed toward procreation within a heterosexual marriage is a sin, with eternal damnation as punishment. She struggles with accepting her burgeoning feelings of sexual desire after both Father Murphy and her best friend, Laura, cause her to feel ashamed of them.

The following Monday, the school is abuzz with a rumor that Alice "tossed the salad" of a classmate, Wade, at Laura's party over the weekend. Alice denies this, admitting to not knowing what the phrase means. The rumor reaches Mrs. Veda, who prevents Alice from serving at Mass. Later that day, during the sacrament of reconciliation, Alice confesses venial sins to Father Murphy and receives a light penance of twenty prayers, which she immediately and fervently fulfills in the school chapel, Father Murphy and Mrs. Veda's words about sex echoing in her mind.

Alice and Laura both decide to attend the school's next "Kirkos" spiritual retreat— Alice to return to the path of righteousness, and Laura to be accepted by Nina, a popular senior. When they arrive on the retreat campgrounds, Laura is excited to find that Nina is a retreat leader, while Alice eyes Chris, a hunky senior who is also a retreat leader. Chris is friendly and enthusiastic, and after Alice is assigned to his group, the two begin to bond. That night, while playing on her contraband cell phone, Alice accidentally discovers that she can pleasure herself using her phone's vibrating feature; however, she stops soon after looking at the crucifix hanging in her room.

On the second day of the retreat, Alice fakes an injury on a hike to get closer to Chris. Nina confiscates Alice's phone; and, as a punishment, Father Murphy assigns Alice to cleaning duties around the retreat house. Once she is alone, she logs onto an AOL chat room from Father Murphy's office computer to ask what "tossing salad" means; before she can find out, the sound of footsteps causes her to hastily shut off the computer and leave. She runs into Nina, who lightheartedly guilts Alice about Alice's presumed sexual encounter with Wade, another instance of Alice's inability to be free of the rumor even while "on Jesus's time".

On the third day of the retreat, Father Murphy announces his discovery of an explicit chat on his computer; of course, no one claims responsibility. He later pushes Alice to confess to acting on her sexual temptations with Wade and doesn't believe her insistence that nothing happened. Alice confronts Wade about his complicity in the rumors spread by failing to deny it, and he leaves without admitting his fault or apologizing. Again, on cleaning duty, Alice witnesses Nina kissing, then fellating, another senior leader in the woods; Alice shares this with Laura, who refuses to believe Alice, accuses Alice of breaking into Father Murphy's office, and ends their friendship, calling Alice a "pervy psycho". Alice returns to Father Murphy's office and frames Wade for the earlier break-in; while hiding to make her escape, she catches Father Murphy masturbating to a pornographic video saved on his computer. Outside, finding herself alone with Chris, Alice kisses him, but he becomes overwhelmed and runs away. That night, Alice flees the campgrounds and stumbles upon a lesbian bar, where she and the owner, Gina, commiserate about how the fear of damnation can warp an adolescent's development. Gina counsels Alice and gives her a ride back to the retreat, encouraging Alice to look into colleges on the West and East Coasts and finally assuaging Alice's curiosity about what "tossing salad" means.

On the last day of the retreat, Alice befriends a socially awkward classmate while Father Murphy pulls Wade aside. With Wade on the hook for the explicit chat incident, Laura makes peace with Alice. At a whole group sharing session, Alice reminds the retreat attendees that everyone is "hiding stuff" and implores them to treat each other with honesty and respect, as Jesus wanted.

Back at school, Alice reassures a still-uncomfortable Chris that they can just be friends. Returning to reconciliation with Father Murphy, Alice boldly reveals that while on the retreat she saw a video of people having sex—both of them knowing, but not discussing, the implications of her confession. Father Murphy assigns a heavier penance of one hundred prayers, but instead of remaining in the chapel, Alice goes home to rewatch and masturbate to the sex scene in Titanic.

== Cast ==
- Natalia Dyer as Alice
- Timothy Simons as Father Murphy
- Wolfgang Novogratz as Chris
- Allison Shrum as Heather
- Francesca Reale as Laura
- John Henry Ward as Adam
- Susan Blackwell as Gina
- Parker Wierling as Wade
- Alisha Boe as Nina
- Donna Lynne Champlin as Mrs. Veda
- Matt Lewis as Ron, Alice's father
- Casey Von Driest as Gail, Alice's mother

== Reception ==
On the review aggregator website Rotten Tomatoes, the film holds an approval rating of 93% based on 127 reviews, with an average rating of 7.1/10. The website's critics consensus reads, "Natalia Dyer's charming performance – and writer-director Karen Maine's sensitive work – will leave audiences saying Yes, God, Yes to this coming-of-age dramedy." On Metacritic, the film has a weighted average score of 71 out of 100, based on 19 critics, indicating "generally favorable reviews".

Richard Brody of The New Yorker called the film a "remarkable" first feature for writer and director Karen Maine, and included it on his list of the best films of 2020.

Yes, God, Yes was named as one of the "Best of SXSW 2019" films by The Hollywood Reporter.
