= Larrington Walker =

Jamaican-born British actor (1946–2017)

- Born: Larrington St Anthony Walker; 1 August 1946; Kingston, Jamaica
- Died: 3 September 2017 (aged 71); Guadeloupe
- Occupation: Actor

Larrington St Anthony Walker (1 August 1946 – 3 September 2017) was a Jamaican-born British actor.

== Biography ==
Born in Kingston, Jamaica, Walker emigrated to the UK in 1956. Walker starred in the British television drama Taboo, and starred in movies such as Second Coming (2014), and Human Traffic (2000), as well as appearing in Minder (1982), The Bill and Inspector Morse. For three seasons from 2008, Walker was a member of the Royal Shakespeare Company and performed in productions of Julius Caesar, The Winter’s Tale, King Lear, and Antony and Cleopatra, among others.

Walker also worked with Lenny Henry in the BBC Radio 4 comedy Rudy’s Rare Records. Walker also played Rudy, the father of Adam (Henry), in the 2014 stage version, which was performed both at the Birmingham Rep and the Hackney Empire.

Walker died on 3 September 2017. His son reported his death on Facebook, and his agent Femi Oguns confirmed it on Twitter. Walker died in Guadeloupe on a day off from filming an episode of Death in Paradise there.
