= Them That Follow =

2019 American film

- Theatrical release poster
- Directed by: Britt Poulton; Dan Madison Savage
- Written by: Britt Poulton; Dan Madison Savage
- Produced by: Gerard Butler; Bradley Gallo; Michael A. Helfant; Danielle Robinson; Alan Siegel
- Starring: Olivia Colman; Kaitlyn Dever; Alice Englert; Jim Gaffigan; Walton Goggins; Thomas Mann; Lewis Pullman
- Cinematography: Brett Jutkiewicz
- Edited by: Joshua Raymond Lee
- Music by: Garth Stevenson
- Production companies: Amasia Entertainment; G-BASE Film Production
- Distributed by: 1091 Pictures (North America); Sony Pictures Releasing International; Stage 6 Films (International)
- Release dates: January 27, 2019 (Sundance); August 2, 2019 (United States)
- Running time: 98 minutes
- Country: United States
- Language: English
- Box office: $159,218

Them That Follow is a 2019 American mystery horror drama film written and directed by Britt Poulton and Dan Madison Savage in their feature directorial debuts. The film stars Olivia Colman, Kaitlyn Dever, Alice Englert, Jim Gaffigan, Walton Goggins, Thomas Mann, and Lewis Pullman. Set in a remote Pentecostal community in Appalachia, it follows Mara Childs (Englert), a woman who, while being courted for marriage by parishioner Garret (Pullman), discovers she is pregnant with the child of her former lover Augie Slaughter (Mann), forcing her to keep both the affair and her pregnancy a secret from her pastor father Lemuel (Goggins), her friend Dilly Picket (Dever), and Augie's parents Hope (Colman) and Zeke (Gaffigan).

Them That Follow premiered at the Sundance Film Festival on January 27, 2019, where it was nominated for the Grand Jury Prize. The film was theatrically released in the United States on August 2, 2019, to mixed reviews from critics.

== Plot ==
Mara Childs is a Pentecostal pastor's daughter raised in a remote community in Appalachia. Mara's father Lemuel runs a sect that incorporates snake handling into his preaching. To her father's pleasure, she is being seriously courted by one of his parishioners, Garret Booner. However, Mara discover she is pregnant with Augie Slaughter's child, who has abandoned the church. Under pressure from her community and her father, Mara decides to accept Garret's proposal.

After a minor dies while handling snakes, Garret informs Lemuel that the police are investigating him. To protect the congregation, Lemuel allows Garret to claim the snakes as his own, costing Garret his job.

Before marriage, Mara undergoes a customary virginity check that all women in the community are expected to go through, conducted by Augie’s mother, Hope. During the examination, Hope discovers Mara's pregnancy but keeps the information from Lemuel and Garret. After Hope arrives home, she realizes Mara has gone to see Augie, who informs Mara that he intends to take a job far away from their community. Believing that Augie could be the father, Hope urges him to repent.

In an attempt to reunite with Mara, Augie attends church and pretends to have a spiritual awakening. Lemuel then urges him to handle a snake which proceeds to bite him in the arm. Augie begs to be allowed to go to a hospital but is denied by his own family and Lemuel. After he attempts to save himself by cutting the poison out of his arm, Mara goes to his room to pray for him. They are then found lying together by Garret who warns Mara to never see Augie again.

The following day, Augie's condition has worsened. After hearing the news, Mara informs her friend, Dilly, that she is pregnant with Augie's child. While told by Lemuel to calm a drunken Garret down, Dilly then informs Garret about how the child isn't his. Garret then fights Mara, physically assaulting her and attempts to rape her before being stopped by Lemuel and thrown out of the house. Before Garrett leaves, he informs Lemuel that Mara's baby isn't his.

To cleanse Mara, Lemuel takes Mara to church and has her handle a snake. At the same time, Augie's parents, aware that he is close to death, decide to perform an amputation at home. Mara survives her encounter with the snake, earning her father's approval, but she ultimately decides to leave him to help Augie who is still sick after the amputation. With his parents’ permission, Mara leaves with Augie to take him to a doctor, promising them that she will always be there for him.

== Cast ==
- Olivia Colman as Hope Slaughter
- Kaitlyn Dever as Dilly Picket
- Alice Englert as Mara Childs
- Jim Gaffigan as Zeke Slaughter
- Walton Goggins as Lemuel Childs
- Thomas Mann as August "Augie" Slaughter
- Lewis Pullman as Garret Booner
- Annie Tedesco as Connie Ray
- Erik Andrews as Harold
- Katherine DeBoer as Bridgette
- Brooks Roseberry as Jed
- Connor Daniel Lysholm as Jace

== Production ==
In August 2017, it was announced Olivia Colman, Alice Englert, and Thomas Mann had joined the cast of the film, with Britt Poulton and Dan Madison Savage directing from a screenplay they wrote. Gerard Butler, Bradley Gallo and Michael Helfant, Danielle Robinson, served as producers on the film, under their Amasia Entertainment and G-Base banners, respectively. In September 2017, Walton Goggins had also been cast, while Kaitlyn Dever and Jim Gaffigan joined in October that same year.

=== Filming ===
Principal photography began in Youngstown, Ohio, on October 24, 2017, and concluded on November 20.

== Release ==
It had its world premiere at the Sundance Film Festival on January 27, 2019. Shortly after, 1091 Pictures and Sony Pictures Worldwide Acquisitions acquired North American and international distribution rights to the film, respectively. It was released August 2, 2019.

== Critical reception ==
Them That Follow holds 59% approval rating on review aggregator Rotten Tomatoes, based on 93 reviews, with an average of 6/10. The website's critics consensus reads, "Them That Follow never quite captures the spiritual fervor of its setting, but the cast's committed performances make for an intermittently satisfying character study." On Metacritic, the film holds a rating of 57 out of 100, based on 23 critics, indicating "mixed or average reviews".
