= Debbie tucker green =

British playwright

debbie tucker green
- Born: London, United Kingdom
- Occupations: Playwright, screenwriter, director
- Writing career
- Notable awards: BAFTA, ARIA

Debbie Tucker Green (stylized in lower-case as debbie tucker green) is a British playwright, screenwriter, and director. She has written a number of plays, including born bad (2003), for which she won the Olivier Award for Most Promising Newcomer in 2004. Most of her stage plays have been produced at the Royal Court Theatre and the Young Vic in London. She has been called "one of the most stylistically innovative and politically engaged playwrights at work in Britain today".

== Career ==
Tucker green was born in London, and before beginning to write plays worked for a decade as a stage manager. Her 2003 play dirty butterfly was produced by the Soho Theatre, and for her play born bad (Hampstead Theatre, 2003) she won the Olivier Award for Most Promising Newcomer in 2004. Her plays have also been staged at the Royal National Theatre, and performed by the Royal Shakespeare Company.

She won a BAFTA Award for random, which was broadcast on Channel 4.

In 2016, she won an ARIA (Audio and Radio Industry Award) from the Radio Academy for her radio play Lament. Produced by BBC Radio Drama London and broadcast on BBC Radio 4, Lament won the Gold Best Audio Dramatisation prize.

=== Film career ===
Tucker green wrote and directed Second Coming (2014), a film set in London starring Nadine Marshall and Idris Elba. The film premiered at the 2014 Toronto International Film Festival. It was given a limited release in the UK by Kaleidoscope Entertainment in June 2015, making green only the fourth British black woman to ever have a movie distributed in the UK, following Ngozi Onwurah, Amma Asante, and Destiny Ekaragha. tucker green was nominated for the BAFTA Award for Outstanding Debut by a British Writer, Director or Producer for the film.

=== Television career ===
In 2018, tucker green was commissioned by Channel 4 to direct an episode of their short film series, Random Acts. It was first broadcast at midnight on 15 August 2018.

== Selected works ==
=== Theatre ===
- two women (Soho Theatre, 2000, dir. Rufus Norris)
- dirty butterfly (Soho Theatre, 2003, dir. Rufus Norris; Young Vic, 2008, dir. Michael Longhurst)
- born bad (Hampstead Theatre, 2003, dir. Kathy Burke)
- trade (The Other Place, 2004; Swan Theatre, Stratford-upon-Avon, 2005, dir. Sacha Wares)
- stoning mary (Royal Court Theatre, 2005, dir. Marianne Elliott)
- generations (Cottesloe Theatre, National Theatre, 2005, dir. Sacha Wares)
- random (Royal Court Theatre, 2008, dir. Sacha Wares; Royal Court Theatre Local, 2010, dir. Sacha Wares)
- laws of war (Royal Court Theatre, 2010)
- truth and reconciliation (Royal Court Theatre, 2011, dir. debbie tucker green)
- nut (The Shed, National Theatre, 2013, dir. debbie tucker green)
- hang (Royal Court Theatre, 2015, dir. debbie tucker green)
- a profoundly affectionate, passionate devotion to someone (-noun) (Royal Court Theatre, 2017, dir. debbie tucker green)
- ear for eye (Royal Court Theatre, 2018)

=== Film ===
- Second Coming (2014)
- ear for eye (2021)

=== Radio ===
- Gone (BBC Radio 3, 2010)
- Lament (BBC Radio 4, 2016)
- Assata Shakur: The FBI's Most Wanted Woman (BBC Radio 4, 2017)

=== Television ===
- Random Acts (Channel 4, 2018)

== Selected awards ==
- 1998 Shortlisted for Alfred Fagon Award for She Three
- 2003 Shortlisted for Susan Smith Blackburn Award for born bad
- 2004 Olivier Award for Most Promising Newcomer for born bad
- 2012 Best Single Drama BAFTA Awards for random
- 2016 Audio and Radio Industry Award (ARIA) for Best Audio Dramatisation for Lament
