= Nadine Marshall =

British actress

- Education: Rose Bruford College
- Occupation: Actress

Nadine Marshall is an English actress. She became known for her performance as Sally in the British television sitcom The Smoking Room (2004–2005).

== Early life and education ==
Nadine Marshall studied at Rose Bruford College of Speech and Drama.

== Career ==
Marshall is best known for her performance as Sally in the British television sitcom The Smoking Room. She has acted in Debbie Tucker Green's play Random and her film Second Coming (2014). Marshall played the character Vron in the Sky Living television sitcom The Spa, with fellow The Smoking Room actress Debbie Chazen.

== Filmography ==
=== Film ===
Year	Title	Role	Notes
2002	Club Le Monde	Vanessa	
2007	It's a Free World...	Diane	
2008	Shish	Val	Short
2009	Heat	Donna	Short
2010	Excluded	Kira	TV film
2010	Love at First Sight	Joanne	Short
2011	random	sister	TV film, stylised lowercase by writer
2013	Leave to Remain	Anna	
2014	Second Coming	Jacqueline "Jax" Jackie	
2016	A Street Cat Named Bob	Kelly	
2017	Paddington 2	Second Ms Peters	
2017	Clean	Woman	Short
2018	Yardie	Miss Hammond	
2020	Sitting in Limbo	Janet	TV film
2021	Ear for Eye	UK Mum	
2022	The Silent Twins	Gloria Gibbons	
2023	Tatami	Jean Claire Abriel	
2024	Bob Marley: One Love	Cedella Malcolm	

=== Television ===
Year	Title	Role	Notes
1986	Hot Metal	Little Girl	Episode: "The Respectable Prostitute"
2002	The Bill	BB	Episode: "Lock and Load"
2004–2005	The Smoking Room	Sally	Series regular
2006	Little Miss Jocelyn	Shop Manager	2 episodes
2007	Judge John Deed	WPC Giffith	Episode: "Evidence of Harm"
2007	Trial & Retribution	Tania Matthews	Episode: "Paradise Lost"
2007	Coming Up	Jackie	Episode: "Spoil"
2007	The Commander	DCI Alison Goody	4 episodes
2008	Casualty	Sue Hartle	Episode: "Take It Back"
2009	Criminal Justice	Norma Fredericks	Series 2 regular
2010	Casualty	Clara	Episode: "Leave Me Alone"
2010	Hounded	Steve	Series regular
2011	The Shadow Line	Forensic Officer	Mini-series
2011	Comedy Lab	Miriam Vice	Episode: "Rick and Peter"
2012	Gates	Melissa	Series regular
2013	The Spa	Vron	Series regular
2013–2015	Old Jack's Boat	Sam Spinnaker	Series regular
2014	Chasing Shadows	Donna Davis	Mini-series
2015	Waterloo Road	Steph Norton	4 episodes
2015	Vera	Ellie Thorne	Episode: "Shadows in the Sky"
2015	New Tricks	Alison Downing	Episode: "The Russian Cousin"
2016	National Treasure	DI Palmer	Mini-series
2017	Death in Paradise	Sabrina Martin	Episode: "Stumped in Murder"
2017	Loaded	Opposing Lawyer	Episode: "Lawsuit"
2018	On the Edge	Josephine	Episode: "A Mother's Love"
2018	The Innocents	Christine Polk	Series regular
2018–2020	Save Me	DS Shola O'Halloran	Series regular
2019	The Victim	Simone Marshall	Mini-series
2019	Plebs	Attica Mars	Episode: "The Dig"
2019	The End of the F***ing World	Bonnie's Mum	Episode: "Series 2, Episode 1"
2020	Small Axe	Jesse	Episode: "Red, White and Blue"
2021	Time	Alicia Cobden	Mini-series
2022	Trigger Point	DSU Marianne Hamilton	TV series
2023	Silent Witness	DI Sarah Torres	Episodes: "Familiar Faces, Parts 1 & 2"
2023	Champion	Aria Champion	Main supporting role
2024	Silent Witness	DI Sarah Torres	Episodes: "Invisible, Parts 1 & 2"
2025	Protection	DCI Amanda Kelman	Mini-series
2026	Babies	Patty	3 episodes

=== Stage ===
Year	Title	Role	Venue	Notes
1996	Henry VIII	Inez	Swan Theatre, Stratford-upon-Avon	with Royal Shakespeare Company
1997	Camino Real	Rosita	Swan Theatre, Stratford-upon-Avon & Young Vic, London	with Royal Shakespeare Company
1997	The Spanish Tragedy	Isabella's Maid	Swan Theatre, Stratford-upon-Avon & The Pit - London	with Royal Shakespeare Company
1997	Kenneth's First Play	Actor 2	The Other Place, Stratford-upon-Avon	with Royal Shakespeare Company
1998	The Shining		Royal Court Theatre, London	
1998	Henry VIII	Inez	Brooklyn Academy of Music, New York City & Young Vic, London	with Royal Shakespeare Company
1999	Timon of Athens	Timandra	Royal Shakespeare Theatre - Stratford-upon-Avon, Theatre Royal - Newcastle upon Tyne & Barbican Centre, London	with Royal Shakespeare Company
1999	The Widow Ranter	Indian Queen/Officer	The Other Place, Stratford-upon-Avon	with Royal Shakespeare Company
1999-2000	Oroonoko	Imoinda	The Other Place - Stratford-upon-Avon, The Pit - London, Newcastle Playhouse, Newcastle upon Tyne & Theatre Royal - Plymouth	with Royal Shakespeare Company
2000	The Last Valentine		Almeida Theatre, London	
2002	Shoot 2 Win!	Shaneequa	Theatre Royal Stratford East, London	
2003	born bad	sister 2	Hampstead Theatre, London	(playwright stylised lowercase)
2005	trade	the novice	Swan Theatre, Stratford-upon-Avon & Soho Theatre, London	with Royal Shakespeare Company, (playwright stylised lowercase)
2008	random	all roles	Royal Court Theatre, London	One-Woman Show, (playwright stylised lowercase)
2013	nut	elayne	The Shed, London	(playwright stylised lowercase)
2014	Father Comes Home From the Wars, Parts 1, 2 & 3	Penny	Royal Court Theatre, London	
