= Kaitlyn Dever =

American actress (born 1996)

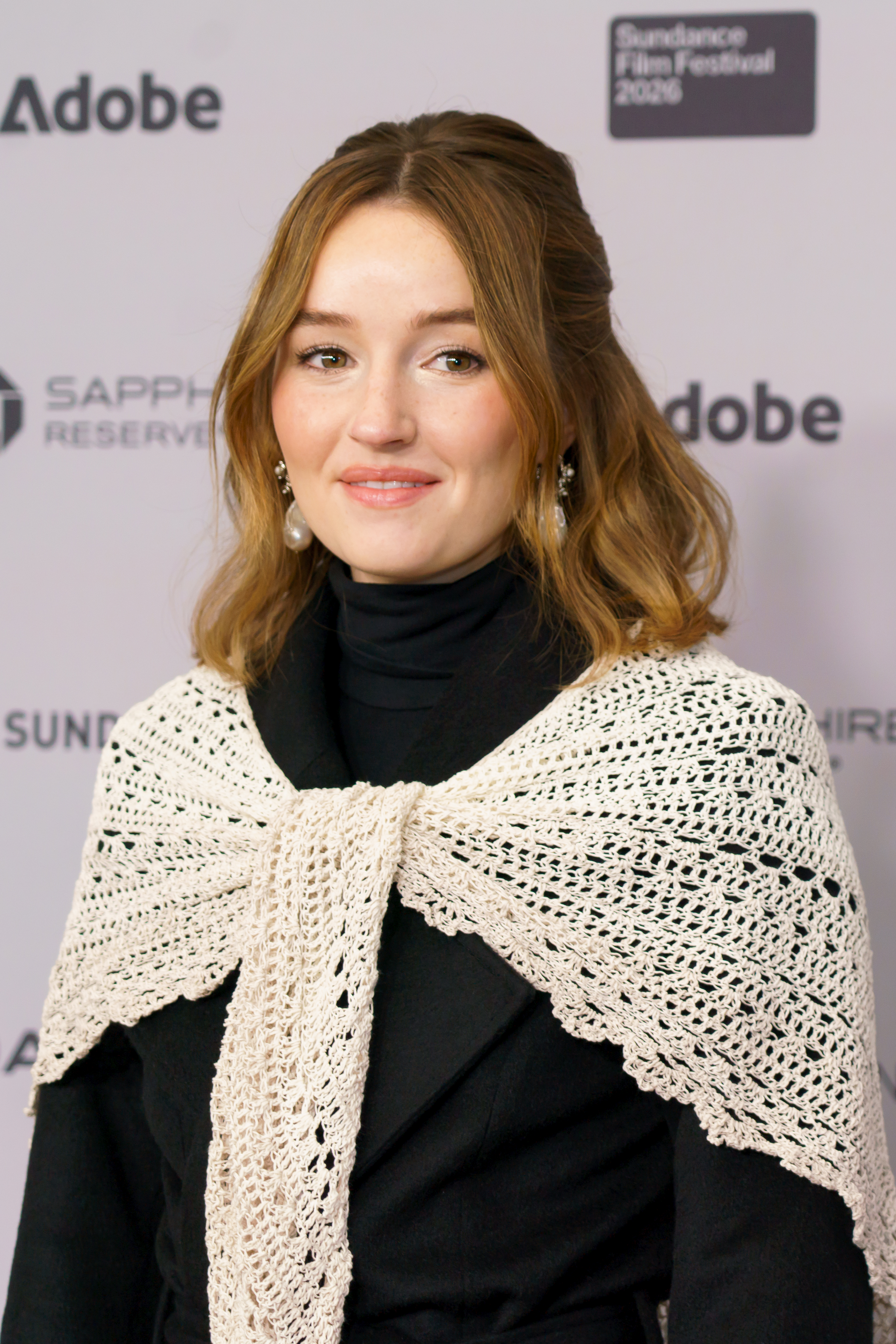
- Dever in 2026
- Born: Kaitlyn Rochelle Dever; December 21, 1996 (age 29); Phoenix, Arizona, U.S.
- Occupation: Actress
- Years active: 2009–present

Kaitlyn Rochelle Dever (/ˈdiːvər/; born December 21, 1996) is an American actress. She is best known for her roles in the television series Justified (2011–2015), Last Man Standing (2011–2021), Unbelievable (2019), Dopesick (2021), Apple Cider Vinegar (2025), and The Last of Us (2025–present). She earned two Golden Globe Award nominations for Unbelievable and Dopesick, in addition to two Primetime Emmy Award nominations for Dopesick and The Last of Us.

Dever has starred in films such as Booksmart (2019), Rosaline (2022), and No One Will Save You (2023). Her supporting roles include Short Term 12 (2013), Detroit (2017), Beautiful Boy (2018), Dear Evan Hansen (2021), and Ticket to Paradise (2022). Outside of acting, she is one half of the musical duo Devers (formerly known as Beulahbelle) with her sister Mady.

== Early life ==
Kaitlyn Rochelle Dever was born in Phoenix, Arizona, on December 21, 1996. Her father also briefly ventured into acting, voicing Barney the Dinosaur on the PBS children's show Barney & Friends for a short time. She has two younger sisters. When she was five years old, she developed an interest in the performing arts and her parents subsequently enrolled her in an acting school. She also participated in ballet, gymnastics, and ice skating, but seeing Toni Collette's performance in The Sixth Sense (1999) inspired her to focus on acting. Her family moved to Dallas, where she filmed a number of commercials, then settled in Los Angeles.

== Career ==
=== Acting ===
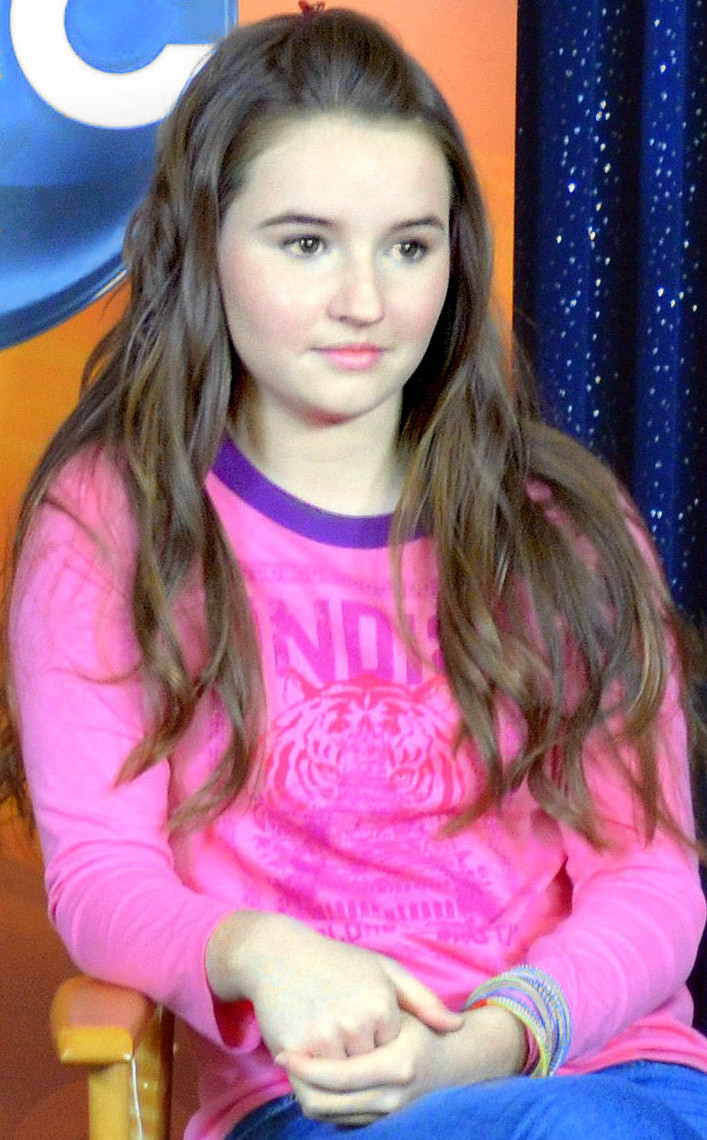
Dever in March 2012

Dever's first notable acting role was as Gwen Thompson in the 2009 film An American Girl: Chrissa Stands Strong. In 2011, she garnered an early breakout role as Loretta McCready in the FX series Justified. In the same year, she was cast as a series regular in the ABC (and later Fox) sitcom Last Man Standing, starring with Tim Allen as her father. Starting with the seventh season of the series, Dever transitioned to a recurring role, allowing her to focus on other film and television projects.

Dever's other television credits include Make It or Break It, Modern Family, Private Practice, Party Down, The Mentalist, and Curb Your Enthusiasm. Her 2011 film credits include Cinema Verite, Bad Teacher, and the Clint Eastwood–directed film J. Edgar. In 2012, Dever was nominated three times at the 33rd Young Artist Awards: for her supporting roles in Bad Teacher and Last Man Standing, and for her recurring role in Justified.

In 2013, Dever appeared in supporting roles in the films The Spectacular Now and Short Term 12. Dever appeared in the 2014 dark comedy film Laggies, directed by Lynn Shelton, alongside Chloë Grace Moretz and Keira Knightley. In the same year, she co-starred in the film Men, Women & Children, directed by Jason Reitman. In 2017, she reunited with Shelton for her drama film Outside In, as a supporting cast member. That same year, she had supporting roles in the films We Don't Belong Here, All Summers End and Detroit.

In 2018, she performed in minor roles for the political drama The Front Runner and the biographical drama Beautiful Boy, the latter alongside Timothée Chalamet.

In early 2019, Dever appeared in the drama-thriller film Them That Follow directed by Britt Poulton and Dan Madison Savage. The film had its world premiere at the Sundance Film Festival on January 27, 2019, and was released on August 2, 2019, by 1091 Media. In mid 2019, Dever starred in the critically acclaimed teen comedy Booksmart directed by Olivia Wilde, opposite Beanie Feldstein. The film had its world premiere at South by Southwest on March 11, 2019, and was released on May 24, 2019, by Annapurna Pictures. She also starred in Unbelievable, a Netflix miniseries that premiered in September 2019. Dever's performance was praised by critics, receiving a Golden Globe nomination for Best Actress – Miniseries or Television Film. She also received nominations for the Critics' Choice Television Award for Best Actress in a Movie/Miniseries, the BAFTA Rising Star Award, and the TCA Award for Individual Achievement in Drama.

In 2020, Dever appeared in the Quibi comedy series Home Movie: The Princess Bride, directed by Jason Reitman, to raise money for World Central Kitchen. Later that year, she co-starred in the Audible audio drama When You Finish Saving the World, written and directed by Jesse Eisenberg. The story is told from the perspective of three family members at different stages of their lives. Dever voices Rachel, an 18-year-old woman recording tapes for her boyfriend stationed in Afghanistan.

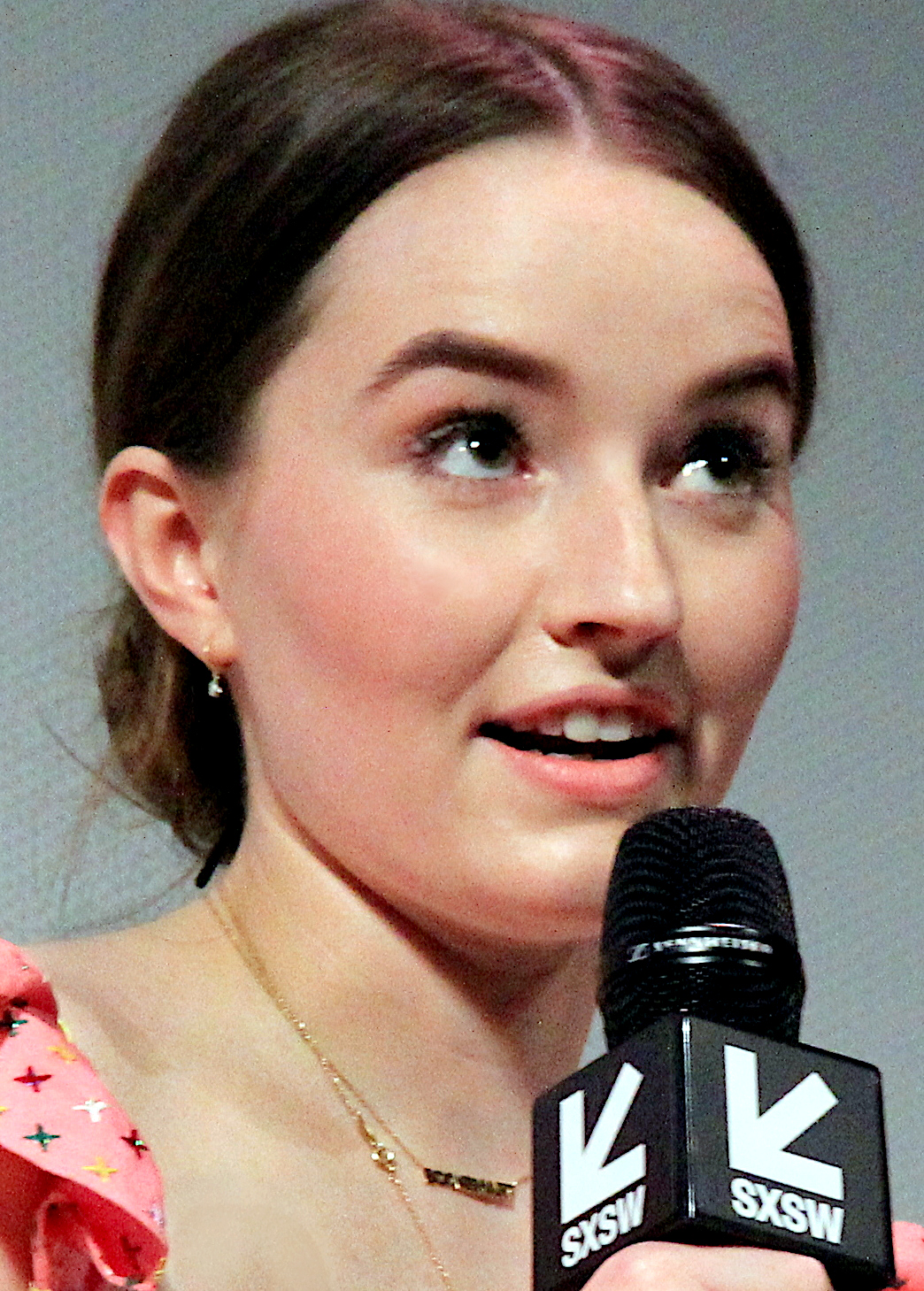
Dever in March 2019

In 2020, Dever starred in the television special Coastal Elites, directed by Jay Roach for HBO. On August 17, 2020, she was cast as Zoe Murphy in Stephen Chbosky's 2021 film adaptation of the Broadway musical Dear Evan Hansen.

Dever appeared in an episode of the anthology series Monsterland for Hulu. In 2021, she starred as Abbi Miller in episode 3 of B. J. Novak's FX anthology series The Premise. Dever also starred in the title role of the film Rosaline. She played Betsy Mallum in the 2021 Hulu miniseries Dopesick, for which she received a Primetime Emmy Award nomination.

Dever starred in the sci-fi thriller film No One Will Save You (2023) on Hulu, in which there is almost no dialogue, and received praise for her ability to tell the story almost entirely through facial expressions. In January 2024, it was announced that she would portray Abby in the second season of The Last of Us, which premiered in April 2025. In January 2025, it was announced that she would join the cast of the next film in the Monsterverse franchise, Godzilla x Kong: Supernova, currently set for release on March 26, 2027.

Dever played the lead role of disgraced wellness influencer and convicted con artist Belle Gibson in the biographical Australian miniseries Apple Cider Vinegar. It was released on Netflix in February 2025.

=== Music ===
From an early age, Dever's parents inspired her musically. Her mother played the Alanis Morissette album Jagged Little Pill on car trips in Dallas, and her father taught Dever and her two sisters to harmonize. Dever and her sister Mady learned piano in their early childhood, but Dever switched to guitar after getting one as a Christmas gift at the age of eight. She cites artists such as ABBA and The Cure as inspirations. Dever and Mady performed in elementary school talent shows together under the name Hot Pink, performing covers from artists such as Avril Lavigne and Kelly Clarkson. They later changed their name to Anime Pearl, performing various gigs in small clubs across Los Angeles. Jason Reitman, who started sending songs back and forth with Dever during the making of Men, Women & Children, attended one of these gigs.

At one point, Reitman sent Dever the Nancy Sinatra song "You Only Live Twice" and suggested that she and Mady perform it together. The two sisters changed their group name to Beulahbelle in 2016 after an ancestor of theirs who had died as an infant. In 2018, they released music for the first time under this name, contributing two cover versions of "You Only Live Twice" and an original track titled "Let You Go" to Reitman's 2018 film Tully at his request. Beulahbelle released their official debut single "Raleigh" on February 15, 2020, with both members directing, producing, and starring in the official music video. They released their second official single, "Being You" on September 10, 2020, amidst plans to release an EP produced by Tony Berg.

"Being You" became Beulahbelle's final single release before changing their name, with their overall final release under the Beulahbelle name being a feature on "It Won't Be Long", a 2021 cover of Neil Young and Crazy Horse's song "Round & Round (It Won't Be Long)" by Berg's daughter Z Berg. Also in 2021, as the character Zoe Murphy, Dever contributed vocals to four songs for the soundtrack of the Dear Evan Hansen film adaptation. In August 2024, the duo announced that they would change their name from Beulahbelle to Devers; their debut single under the new name, "Poison", was released on September 4.

== Filmography ==
=== Film ===
Year	Title	Role	Notes
2011	Bad Teacher	Sasha Abernathy	
2011	J. Edgar	Palmer's Daughter	
2013	The Spectacular Now	Krystal	
2013	Short Term 12	Jayden Cole	
2014	Laggies	Misty	
2014	Men, Women & Children	Brandy Beltmeyer	
2017	All Summers End	Grace Turner	
2017	We Don't Belong Here	Lily Green	
2017	Detroit	Karen Malloy	
2017	Outside In	Hildy Beasley	
2018	The Front Runner	Andrea Hart	
2018	Beautiful Boy	Lauren	
2019	Them That Follow	Dilly Picket	
2019	Booksmart	Amy Antsler	
2021	Dear Evan Hansen	Zoe Murphy	
2022	Ticket to Paradise	Lily Cotton	
2022	Rosaline	Rosaline	Also executive producer
2023	Next Goal Wins	Nicole Megaloudis	Cameo
2023	No One Will Save You	Brynn Adams	Also executive producer
2023	Good Grief	Lily Kayne	Cameo
2025	A House of Dynamite	Caroline Baker	Cameo
2026	See You When I See You	Leah Whistler	
2027	Godzilla x Kong: Supernova †	TBA	Post-production

Key
†	Denotes films that have not yet been released

=== Television ===
Year	Title	Role	Notes
2009	An American Girl: Chrissa Stands Strong	Gwen Thompson	Television film
2009	Make It or Break It	Adorable Girl	Episode: "Pilot"
2009	Modern Family	Bianca Douglas	Episode: "Fizbo"
2010	Private Practice	Paige	Episode: "Love Bites"
2010	Party Down	Escapade Dunfree	Episode: "Party Down Company Picnic"
2011	Cinema Verite	Michelle Loud	Television film
2011	The Mentalist	Trina	Episode: "Blood for Blood"
2011–2015	Justified	Loretta McCready	17 episodes
2011	Curb Your Enthusiasm	Kyra O'Donnell	Episode: "The Divorce"
2011–2021	Last Man Standing	Eve Baxter	Main role (seasons 1–6); Recurring role (seasons 7–9)
2019	Unbelievable	Marie Adler	Miniseries
2020	Home Movie: The Princess Bride	Westley	Episode: "Chapter Four: Battle of the Wits"
2020	Coastal Elites	Sharynn Tarrows	Television film
2020	Monsterland	Toni / Jennifer	3 episodes
2021	The Premise	Abbi Miller	Episode: "The Ballad of Jesse Wheeler"
2021	Dopesick	Betsy Mallum	Miniseries
2025	Apple Cider Vinegar	Belle Gibson	Miniseries; also executive producer
2025–present	The Last of Us	Abby	Recurring role (season 2); Lead role (season 3)

Key
†	Denotes TV productions that have not yet been released

=== Video games ===
Year	Title	Role	Notes
2016	Uncharted 4: A Thief's End	Cassie Drake	Voice and motion capture
2024	Open Roads	Tess Devine	Voice

=== Music videos ===
Year	Title	Artist	Role	Notes
2019	"Graduation"	Benny Blanco and Juice Wrld	Decker	
2020	"Raleigh"	Beulahbelle	Herself	Co-director and co-producer

=== Audiobooks ===
Year	Title	Role	Author	Notes
2020	When You Finish Saving the World	Rachel Katz	Jesse Eisenberg	Audible Original

== Awards and nominations ==
Organizations	Year	Category	Work	Result	Ref.
AACTA Awards	2026	Best Lead Actress in a Television Drama	Apple Cider Vinegar	Nominated	
Astra Film Awards (Note: Previously known as Hollywood Critics Association Film Awards.)	2020	Best Performance by an Actress 23 and Under	Booksmart	Won	
Astra Film Awards	2020	Next Generation of Hollywood	Herself	Won	
Astra TV Awards (Note: Previously known as Hollywood Critics Association TV Awards.)	2022	Best Supporting Actress in a Limited Series and Movie	Dopesick	Won	
Astra TV Awards	2024	Best Actress in a Limited Series or TV Movie	No One Will Save You	Nominated	
Astra TV Awards	2025	Best Actress in a Limited Series or TV Movie	Apple Cider Vinegar	Nominated	
Astra TV Awards	2025	Best Guest Actress in a Drama Series	The Last of Us	Nominated	
BAFTA Awards	2019	Rising Star Award	Herself	Nominated	
Behind the Voice Actors	2017	Best Vocal Ensemble in a Video Game	Uncharted 4: A Thief's End	Nominated	
CinemaCon	2019	Female Stars of Tomorrow (shared with Beanie Feldstein)	Booksmart	Won	
Critics' Choice Television Awards	2019	Best Actress in a Miniseries or TV Movie	Unbelievable	Nominated	
Critics' Choice Television Awards	2021	Best Supporting Actress in a Miniseries or TV Movie	Dopesick	Nominated	
Critics' Choice Television Awards	2023	Best Actress in a Miniseries or TV Movie	No One Will Save You	Nominated	
Critics' Choice Super Awards	2024	Best Actress in a Science Fiction/Fantasy Movie	No One Will Save You	Nominated	
Detroit Film Critics Society	2019	Best Breakthrough Performance	Booksmart / Them That Follow	Nominated	
Dorian Awards	2020	Rising Star of the Year Award	Herself	Nominated	
Fangoria Chainsaw Awards	2024	Best Lead Performance	No One Will Save You	Nominated	
Golden Globe Awards	2019	Best Actress – Miniseries or Television Film	Unbelievable	Nominated	
Golden Globe Awards	2021	Best Supporting Actress – Series, Miniseries or Television Film	Dopesick	Nominated	
Gracie Awards	2022	Actress in a Leading Role – Limited Series or TV Movie	Dopesick	Won	
Indiana Film Journalists Association	2019	Best Actress	Booksmart	Nominated	
Logie Awards	2025	Best Lead Actress in a Drama	Apple Cider Vinegar	Nominated	
Newport Beach Film Festival	2019	Ensemble Cast	Them That Follow	Won	
Online Film & Television Association	2020	Best Actress in a Motion Picture or Limited Series	Unbelievable	Nominated	
Online Film & Television Association	2022	Best Supporting Actress in a Motion Picture or Limited Series	Dopesick	Runner-up	
Online Film & Television Association	2025	Best Actress in a Motion Picture, Limited or Anthology Series	Apple Cider Vinegar	Nominated	
Online Film & Television Association	2025	Best Guest Actress in a Drama Series	The Last of Us	Won	
Phoenix Film Critics Society	2013	Best Youth Performance – Female	Short Term 12	Nominated	
Primetime Emmy Awards	2022	Outstanding Supporting Actress in a Limited Series or Movie	Dopesick	Nominated	
Primetime Emmy Awards	2025	Outstanding Guest Actress in a Drama Series	The Last of Us	Nominated	
TCA Awards	2020	Individual Achievement in Drama	Unbelievable	Nominated	
Young Artist Awards	2011	Best Guest Starring Young Actress – Television Series	Private Practice	Nominated	
Young Artist Awards	2012	Best Supporting Young Actress – Feature Film	Bad Teacher	Nominated	
Young Artist Awards	2012	Best Supporting Young Actress – Television Series	Last Man Standing	Nominated	
Young Artist Awards	2012	Best Recurring Young Actress – Television Series	Justified	Nominated	
