= Rebecca Serle =

American author and television writer

Rebecca Serle is an American author and television writer. Her novel In Five Years was a New York Times best seller, and her Famous in Love series was adapted into a young adult television series on Freeform.

== Personal life ==
Serle received a Master of Fine Arts degree from The New School.

She grew up in Maui and currently has residences in New York City and Los Angeles.

== Selected works ==
=== In Five Years (2020) ===
In Five Years was published March 10, 2020 by Atria Books.

Before publication, In Five Years was named one of the most anticipated books of 2020 by Good Housekeeping and She Reads.

After publication, the book was a New York Times and IndieBound best seller and was a book club selection for Good Morning America and Marie Claire. The New York Times named the audiobook edition of their "New & Noteworthy Audiobooks" in March 2020.

It received positive reviews from Kirkus, Seattle Book Review, Booklist, Library Journal, and Publishers Weekly.

In Five Years was nominated for a Goodreads Choice Award for Romance.

=== One Italian Summer (2022) ===
One Italian Summer was published on March 1, 2022 by Atria Books. The book was named one of "Goodreads Members' Most Anticipated Books of 2022."

It has received a positive review from Kirkus.

=== Famous in Love series (2014–2015) ===
The Famous in Love series consists of two books: Famous in Love (2014) and Truly, Madly, Famously (2015).

Famous in Love received positive reviews from Kirkus and Publishers Weekly. The sequel received a positive review from Booklist.

==== Television adaptation ====
Freeform adapted the series into a young adult television series by the same name. The series ran for two seasons from April 18, 2017 to June 29, 2018.

== Publications ==
=== Standalone novels ===
- When You Were Mine (2012)
- The Edge of Falling (2014)
- The Dinner List (2018)
- In Five Years (2020)
- One Italian Summer (2022)
- Expiration Dates (2024)
- ‘’Once and Again’’ (2026)

=== Famous in Love series ===
- Locked

1. Famous in Love (2014)
2. Truly, Madly, Famously (2015)

== Adaptations ==
- Famous in Love (2017–2018)
- Rosaline (2022)
